= List of Maharaja Sayajirao University of Baroda people =

This is a list of alumni and faculty at the Maharaja Sayajirao University of Baroda.

== Alumni ==
=== Arts ===
| Name | Class Year | Degree | Notability | References |
|---|---|---|---|---|
| Robert mongare | 1993 | MFA | Artist | |
| Dadasaheb Phalke | | | Film director, producer, and screenwriter. Father of Indian Cinema. | |
| Dhruva Mistry | | | Sculptor | |
| Elisha Kriis | | BBA | Actress | |
| Gulam Mohammed Sheikh | | | painter and writer. | |
| Haku Shah | | | Indian painter | |
| Jay Pinak Oza | | BFA (Art History & Aesthetics) | Indian cinematographer | |
| Jayant Parikh | 1959; 1961 | BA in Fine Art; MA | Indian painter, printmaker and mural artist | |
| Jyoti Bhatt | | | Indian painter, photographer | |
| Jyotsna Bhatt | 1958 | | Indian ceramist and potter | |
| Mitali Mukherjee | | | singer | |
| Mrinalini Mukherjee | | | sculptor and textile artist | |
| N. N. Rimzon | | | artist | |
| Nilima Sheikh | | | artist | |
| Ratan Parimoo | | | Painter and art historian | |
| Surendran Nair | | | artist | |
| Tanvi Vyas | | | actress and model | |
| Vivan Sundaram | | | artist | |

=== Social Sciences and Law ===
| Name | Class Year | Degree | Notability | References |
|---|---|---|---|---|
| Bela Trivedi | | | Judge, Supreme Court of India | |
| Akshay H. Mehta | | | Former Judge of the Gujarat High Court | |
| Chimanbhai Patel | | | Former Chief Minister of Gujarat and Member of Parliament | |
| Mohit Shantilal Shah | 1976 | LLB | Former Chief Justice of the Bombay High Court | |
| Ranjitsinh Pratapsinh Gaekwad | | | Former Maharaja of Baroda and Member of Parliament. | |
| Arvind Shah | | | Sociologist | |
| Sujan R. Chinoy | | BA (Hons.) in English Literature and Psychology | Former Ambassador of India to Japan and the Marshall Islands | |
| Partha Pratim Shil | 2003 | BA in Political Science | Professor at Stanford University Department of History | |

=== Science ===
| Name | Class Year | Degree | Notability | References |
|---|---|---|---|---|
| J.S. Bandukwala | | PhD in Physics | Prominent human rights activist and associate professor. | |
| Sandip Pakvasa | 1957 | BSc and MSc in Physics | Physicist. Awarded the 2016 Breakthrough Prize in Fundamental Physics, as a member of the Kamioka Liquid Scintillator Antineutrino Detector Collaboration. American Physical Society Fellow, Humboldt Prize Fellow. | |
| Sam Pitroda | 1964 | BSc and Msc in Physics | Telecom engineer, entrepreneur and politician. Father of Telecommunications revolution in India. He served as advisor to Prime Minister Indira Gandhi of India on Public Information Infrastructure and Innovation and as a Cabinet Minister under Rajiv Gandhi and as the Chairman of the National Knowledge Commission under Prime Minister Manmohan Singh from 2005 to 2009. | |
| Venkatraman Ramakrishnan | 1971 | BSc in Physics | Biologist. Awarded the 2009 Nobel Prize in Chemistry and Louis-Jeantet Prize for Medicine for his research in ribosome. President of the Royal Society since November 2015 to November 2020 | |
| Arup Kumar Raychaudhuri | 1973 | BSc in Physics | Physicist. Awarded Shanti Swarup Bhatnagar Prize in 1994 for doing "pioneering experimental work in the field of low temperature quantum transport in oxides near metal-insulator transition elucidating the interplay of disorder and interaction." Humboldt Prize Fellow. | |
| Karan Jani | | | Physicist. He is a part of the LIGO Scientific Collaboration which detected GW14092015, first such observation of gravitational waves from binary black hole merger. For this pathbreaking discovery, the pioneers of the very collaboration were awarded the 2017 Nobel Prize in Physics. | |
| Kanury Venkata Subba Rao | | | Immunologist. Awarded Shanti Swarup Bhatnagar in 1997 in the field of Biological Sciences for "outstanding contribution in the design of synthetic peptide vaccines based on the regeneration of conformational epitopes and self association of such peptides to give high immunogenicity in humans." | |
| Chintan Shah | 2011 | BSc and MSc in Physics | Physicist. He currently works at NASA's Goddard Space Flight Center and is part of the X-ray instrumentation and calibration working groups for future X-ray space observatories such as XRISM, Athena, and LEM. | |

=== Technology ===
| Name | Class Year | Degree | Notability | References |
|---|---|---|---|---|
| Ajay Bhatt | | | Computer Architect. Co-invented Universal Serial Bus | |
| Paritosh Pandya | | | Computer scientist. Former Dean, School of Technology and Computer Science at Tata Institute of Fundamental Research. He is known for his research in Logics, Automata, Concurrency, Formal Methods, Embedded Systems and Software Engineering. | |
| Vijay P. Bhatkar | | | Computer Scientist. Chancellor of Nalanda University. He is primarily known as the Inventor of PARAM Super computer. | |
| Vishal Sikka | | | Former CEO of Infosys; CTO and Executive Board member of SAP AG | |
| Shankar Subbanarasayya Mantha | | | Indian Academician and Administrator. Former Chairman, All India Council for Technical Education (AICTE) and currently Adjunct Professor of National Institute of Advanced Studies, Bangalore. He is known for reforms in AICTE that brought transparency and accountability. | |

=== Others ===
==== A ====
- Asha Puthli, producer, recording artist, composer, publisher.
- Ankur Vikal, Indian film and theatre actor.
- Arup Kumar Raychaudhuri, condensed matter physicist, Shanti Swarup Bhatnagar laureate

==== B ====
- Bakul Harshadrai Dholakia, former director of IIM Ahmedabad, a Padma Shri awardee
- Bharati Mukherjee, Bharati Mukherjee, the writer of Immigrant Life.
- Bela Trivedi, Judge, Supreme Court of India.

==== C ====
- Chintan Upadhyay, an Indian contemporary artist.

==== D ====
- Deepak Shimkhada, a Nepali American educator, artist, art historian.

==== E ====
- Esther David is an Indian Jewish author.

==== G ====
- Geetanjali Shree, a novelist, short story writer and winner of 2022 International Booker Prize.
- Gunvant Shah, a noted thinker, writer and columnist.

==== H ====
- Hasmukh Patel architect credited with making significant contributions .
- Hemlata Talesra, educationalist and activist

==== K ====
- K. Chidananda Gowda, former Vice-Chancellor of Kuvempu University.
- Kavitha Balakrishnan, an art critic.

==== L ====
- Laxma Goud, painter, printmaker and draughtsman.
- Latika Katt, an Indian sculptor.

==== M ====
- Mrunalini Devi Puar, the Chancellor of the Maharaja Sayajirao University of Baroda.

==== P ====
- Pramod Kale, a scientist and former director, Vikram Sarabhai Space Centre.
- Pankaj Advani (director), film-director, film-editor, screenplay-writer, photographer, theater director, and painter.
- Pan Nalin, director, screenwriter and documentary-maker.

==== R ====
- Robert mongare (author)|Rajendra Shah]], lyrical Gujarati poet and philosopher.
- Reetika Khera, economist and teacher.

==== S ====
- S. L. Bhyrappa, Kannada novelist and philosopher.
- Shanti Dave, painter and sculptor.
- Srilamanthula Chandramohan, an artist.
- Sosa Joseph, an Indian contemporary artist.
- Salma Arastu, an Indian artist.

==== T ====
- Thota Vaikuntam, an Indian painter.

==== V ====
- Vinoba Bhave, Indian advocate of nonviolence and human rights; "National Teacher of India", spiritual successor of Mahatma Gandhi
- Vihang A. Naik, (b.1969) Indian poet .
- Vivan Sundaram, an Indian contemporary artist.

== Notable faculty ==
| Name | Affiliation | Notability |
|---|---|---|
| Geoffrey Wainwright | Professor of environmental archaeology between 1961 and 1963 | archaeologist |
| Gunvant Shah | Lecturer between 1961 and 1972 | Writer |
| K. G. Subramanyan | Lecturer at the Faculty of Fine Arts between 1951 and 1956 | Artist |
| Nasreen Mohamedi | Lecturer at the Faculty of Fine Arts between 1972 and 1990 | artist |
| Rajni Kothari | Lecturer (joined the university in 1958) | Political Scientist |
| M. N. Srinivas | Lecturer (established the Department of Sociology) | Sociologist |
| Arvind Shah | Lecturer | Sociologist |
