= Jehangir Nicholson Art Foundation =

Art museum in Mumbai, India

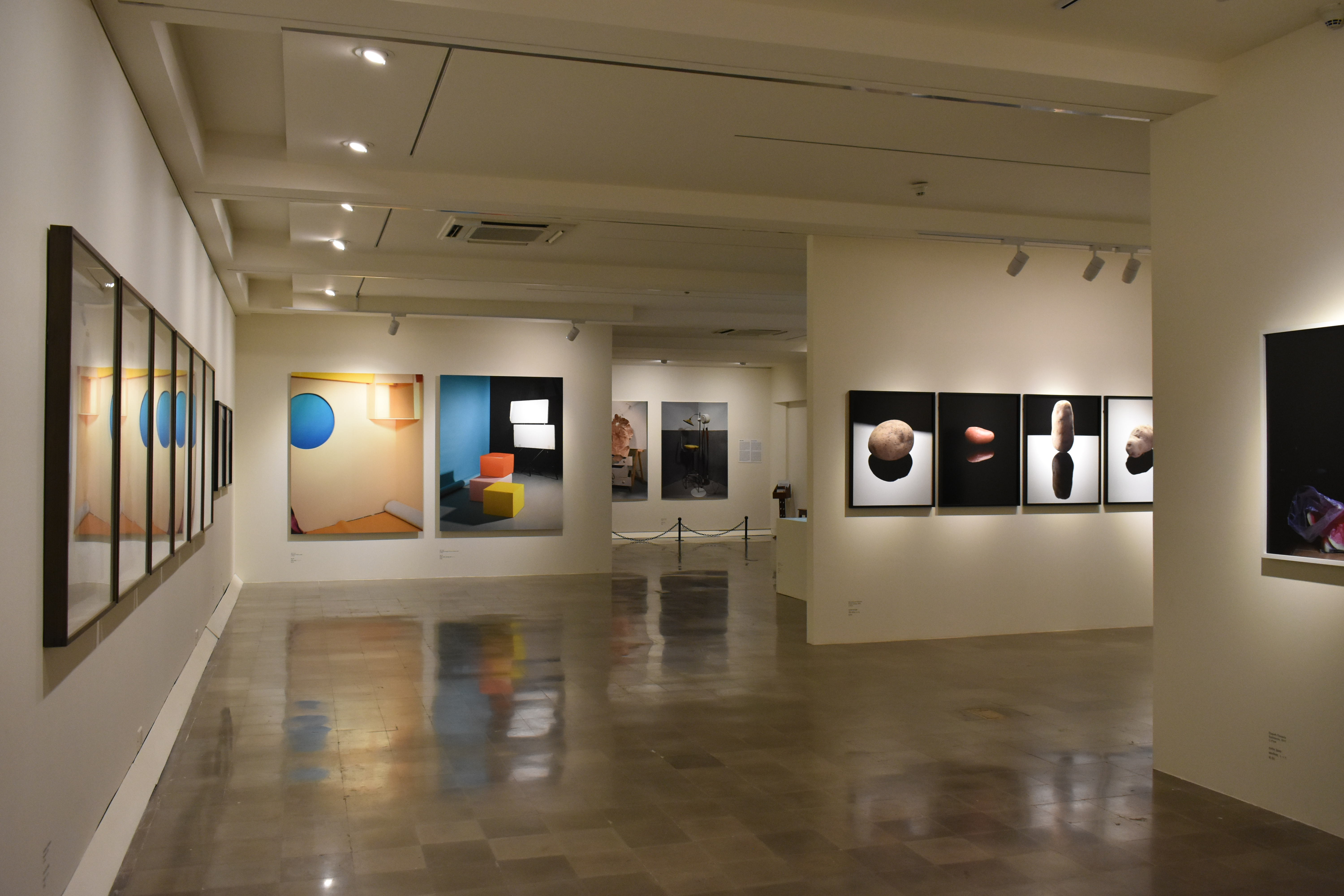
- Jehangir Nicholson gallery
- Established: 2011
- Location: Fort, Mumbai
- Collections: Modern art and contemporary art
- Collection size: 800+ artworks and sculptures
- Director: Puja Vaish
- Website: http://jnaf.org/

The Jehangir Nicholson Art Foundation (JNAF) is a private, not-for-profit organization located in Mumbai, India, with its core interest in promoting the preservation, exhibition, education, and research of post-colonial Indian modern art. The collection is endowed by the personal collection of the late Jehangir Nicholson, comprising over 800 pieces of art across mediums from artists including M. F. Husain, Vasudeo S. Gaitonde, S. H. Raza, K. H. Ara. The foundation is currently housed in the Chhatrapati Shivaji Maharaj Vastu Sangrahalaya (CSMVS), and functions as the modern and contemporary art wing of the museum.

== History ==
Jehangir Nicholson (1915 ― 2001) was a chartered accountant and the last heir of a cotton gin and press, Breul and Co. (est.1863). Nicholson's introduction to the art world was in December 1968 when he purchased a landscape by Sharad Waykool, who was exhibiting in the Taj Art Gallery. This led Nicholson to become an active patron for two of the major galleries in Mumbai, Chemould and Pundole. Not only did he build a sizeable and museum-quality personal collection, but he also formed friendships with a number of artists, especially members from the Bombay Progressive Artists' Group.

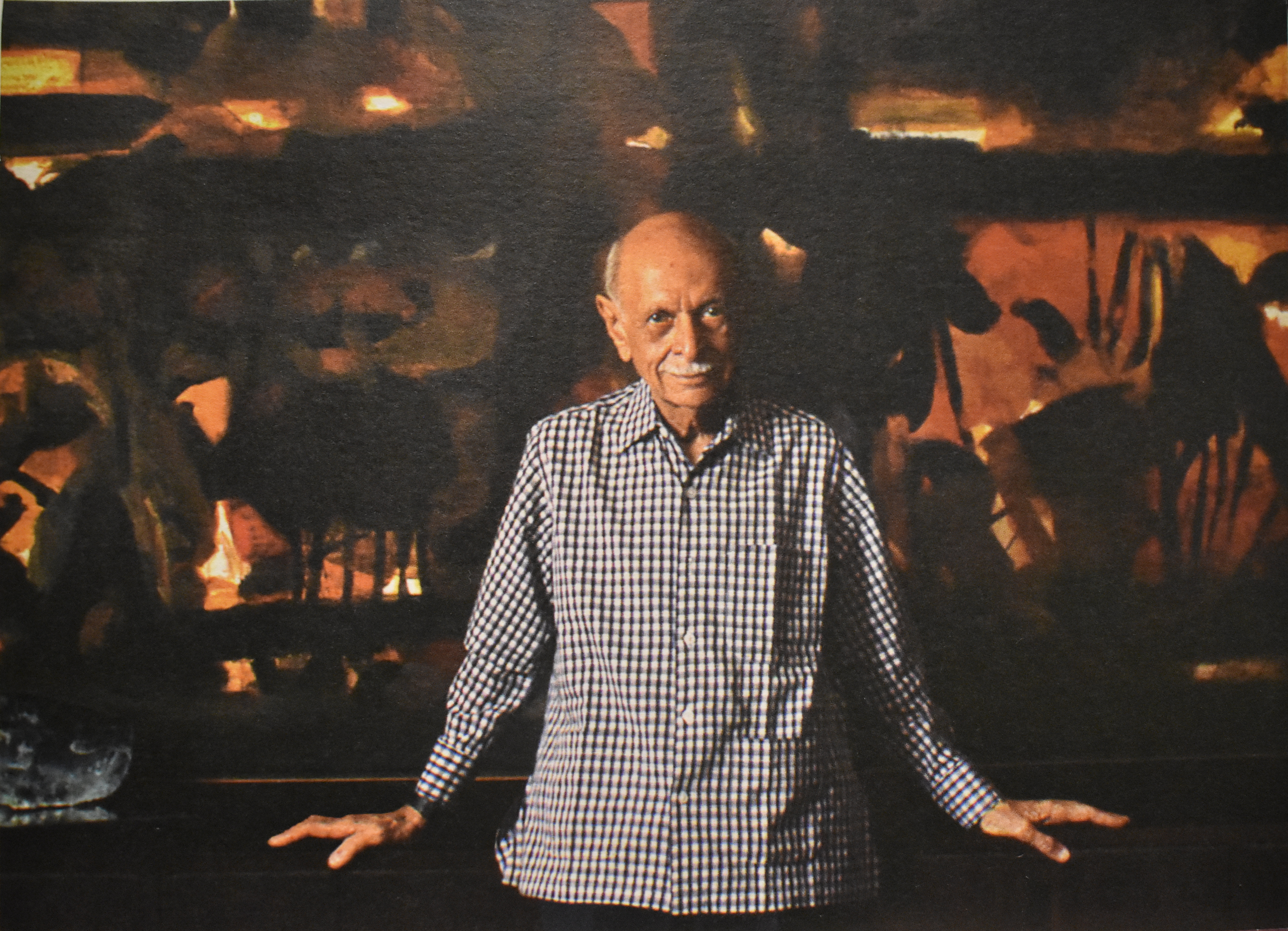
Jehangir Nicholson

As Nicholson's collection grew throughout the 1960s, he maintained the vision of sharing his pieces with the public by building a museum dedicated to contemporary art. In 1976, he loaned part of his collection to the National Centre for the Performing Arts (NCPA) in order to establish the Jehangir Nicholson Museum of Modern Art, with the help of V. K. Narayana Menon, the chairman of NCPA, J. R. D. Tata, and Bal Chhabda. This venture was one of the first public-facing museums of post-colonial art in Mumbai. Additionally, Nicholson organized two public exhibitions at the National Gallery of Modern Art (NGMA), in Mumbai, 1998 and in Delhi, 1999, where he displayed more than 250 works from his private collection.

With the sheer number of works he collected, the space at the NGMA was simply not enough. Therefore, Nicholson furthered his quest to build a museum of contemporary art that could accommodate his growing collection by actively negotiating with the government for land to establish a free-standing museum - an effort he continued until his death in 2001 and included in his will. The Jehangir Nicholson Museum at NCPA closed down shortly after in the same year.

Nicholson's godson Cyrus Guzder and lawyer Kaiwan Kalyaniwalla established the Jehangir Nicholson Art Foundation based on his will, aiming to preserve, document, and update one of the richest private collections that reflects the complexities, vitality, and crucial phases of development in modern Indian art history. In 2008, the foundation entered a partnership with the CSMVS to set up the Jehangir Nicholson Gallery (opened in 2011) as the modern and contemporary art wing in the East Annexe of the museum. The foundation also houses its office, a library, and a research center, as well as a visible storage archive for the JNAF collection. The Jehangir Nicholson Gallery celebrated its 10th year of opening in 2021.

== Collection ==
The Jehangir Nicholson Collection has great historical interest and importance because it often covers a wide range of works chronologically for each of the artists, adding understanding to the dimension and scope of representations. It comprises over 800 works of modern and contemporary Indian art procured from 1968 to 2001 by Nicholson. The core strength of the collection lies in its comprehensiveness of the works by the Bombay Progressive Artists and their contemporaries, including S. H. Raza, K. H. Ara, V. S. Gaitonde, Tyeb Mehta, M. F. Husain, Akbar Padamsee, Ram Kumar, Krishen Khanna, F. N. Souza, and Laxman Shreshtha.

The collection also includes a vast number of works from artists that are often associated with the Baroda Group, including K. G. Subramanyan, N. S. Bendre, Bhupen Khakhar, Jayant Parikh, Gulam Mohammed Sheikh, Rekha Rodwittiya, Vivan Sundaram, and Nilima Sheikh. Other artists that are represented include Homi Patel, Ganesh Haloi, Prabhakar Kolte, Prabhakar Barwe, Jogen Chowdhury, Bikash Bhattacharjee, C. Douglas, Surendran Nair, Nalini Malani, and Arpana Caur.

Aside from two-dimensional pieces, the collection also contains works from sculptors such as Pilloo Pochkhanawala, Adi Davierwala, Sankho Chaudhuri, Ramesh Pateria, Nagji Patel, and B. Vithal.

== Exhibitions ==
- Nalini Malani: The Fragility of Time (12 Aug 2024 ― 5 Nov 2024)
- A Forest in the City: Living within Sanjay Gandhi National Park / Aarey Colony in Mumbai (In collaboration with KRVIA, Mumbai, and Pani Haq Samiti) (26 Apr 2024 ― 24 Jul 2024)
- A Cinematic Imagination Josef Wirsching and the Bombay Talkies (1 Mar 2024 ― 17 Apr 2024)
- Out of Place: Journeys through Indian Art (18 Oct 2023 ― 19 Feb 2024)
- Mycelial Legacies II: Exhibition of women artists from the Faculty of Fine Arts, M.S. University, Vadodara (9 Jun 2023 ― 24 Sep 2023)
- Nasreen Mohamedi: The Vastness, Again & Again (31 Jan 2023 ― 28 May 2023)
- Re-citing land | Ganesh Haloi: six decades of painting (In collaboration with The CSMVS and The Kiran Nadar Museum of Art, New Delhi) (11 Nov 2022 ― 11 Jan 2023)
- Woman Is As Woman Does (Exhibited at the JNAF Gallery and the Premchand Roychand Gallery) (13 Aug 2022 ― 16 Oct 2022)
- S.H. Raza | Zamin: Homelands (In collaboration with the CSMVS, Art Musings and The Raza Foundation) (2 Jun 2022 ― 31 Jul 2022)
- Ancestors | Sahej Rahal (Supported by the Sher-Gil Sundaram Arts Foundation) (19 Feb 2022 ― 11 May 2022)
- F.N. Souza: The Power and the Glory (30 Oct 2021 ― 11 Jan 2022)
- Akbar Padamsee: A Tribute | Works from the Jehangir Nicholson Collection (9 Jan 2020 ― 9 Apr 2020)
- V. S. Gaitonde: The Silent Observer (3 Aug 2019 ― 3 Nov 2019)
- Foy Nissen's Bombay: Photographs from the archive of Foy Nissen (15 Mar 2019 ― 14 Jul 2019)
- Still/Life: Dutch Contemporary Photography (In collaboration with Foam Fotografiemuseum, Amsterdam) (30 Nov 2018 ― 10 Feb 2019)
- Jayashree Chakravarty | Earth as Haven: under the canopy of love (11 Sep 2018 ― Nov 2018)
- Songs from the Blood of the Weary (Dialogues of Peace): Rekha Rodwittiya (19 Apr 2018 ― 19 Aug 2018)
- India & The World: A History in Nine Stories (In collaboration with CSMVS, the British Museum, London and the National Museum, New Delhi; Supported by the Ministry of Culture, the Tata Trusts, the Getty Foundation and the Newton Bhabha Fund) (11 Nov 2017 ― 18 Feb 2018)
- Gedney in India (In collaboration with Duke University Libraries) (9 Mar 2017 ― 30 Jun 2017)
- Kanu's Gandhi (In collaboration with Nazar Foundation) (12 Jan 2017 ― 26 Feb 2017)
- Laxman Shreshtha: The Infinite Project (18 Aug ― 31 Dec 2016)
- The Journey is the Destination: The Artist's Journey between Then and Now (15 Mar 2016 ― 31 Jul 2016)
- Jitish Kallat: Covering Letter (15 Feb 2016 ― 28 Feb 2016)
- Unpacking the Studio: Celebrating the Jehangir Sabavala Bequest (In collaboration with the CSMVS) (15 Sep 2015 ― 31 Dec 2015)
- Ram Kumar: Works in the Jehangir Nicholson Collection (25 Apr 2015 ― 25 Aug 2015)
- Portraits of a Collector: Photographs by Jehangir Nicholson (In collaboration with the FOCUS Photography Festival) (12 Mar 2015 ― 26 Mar 2015)
- Howard Hodgkin: Paintings 1984-2015, A Tribute (In collaboration with the CSMVS and Tate; Supported by Gagosian Gallery, British Council India, Pheroza and Jamshyd Godrej and other donors) (20 Feb 2015 ― 15 Apr 2015)
- Kekoo, Kali & Jehangir: Framing A Collection (19 Sep 2014 ― 31 Jan 2015)
- Taking The Line For A Walk (1 Mar 2014 ― 30 Aug 2014)
- Mohan Samant: Paintings (In collaboration with the Estate of Mohan Samant) (11 Oct 2013 ― 10 Feb 2014)
- Nothing is Absolute: A Journey Through Abstraction (In collaboration with the CSMVS) (26 Feb 2013 ― 30 Sep 2013)
- Voicing a Presence: Women artists from the Jehangir Nicholson Collection (27 Apr 2012 ― 14 Feb 2013)
- Six Decades: Celebrating the Bombay Artists from the Jehangir Nicholson Collection (11 Apr 2011 ― 15 Apr 2012)

== Publications ==
- A Forest in the City: Living within Sanjay Gandhi National Park / Aarey Colony in Mumbai, JNAF, 2024, ISBN 978-81-957115-8-1
- Re-citing land: Ganesh Haloi, JNAF, 2023, ISBN 978-81-957115-4-3
- Nasreen Mohamedi: The Vastness, Again & Again, JNAF, 2023, ISBN 978-81-957115-5-0
- Mycelial Legacies II: Exhibition of women artists from the Faculty of Fine Arts, M.S. University, Vadodara, JNAF, 2023, ISBN 978-81-957115-6-7
- Ancestors | Sahel Rahaj, JNAF, 2022, ISBN 978-81-957115-1-2
- Akbar Padamsee: A Tribute | Works in the JNAF Collection, JNAF, 2020, ISBN 978-81-957115-2-9
- S.H. Raza | Zamin: Homelands, JNAF, 2019, ISBN 978-81-957115-0-5
- Foy Nissen’s Bombay: Photographs from the Archive of Foy Nissen, JNAF, 2019, ISBN 978-81-928046-9-9
- V.S. Gaitonde: The Silent Observer, JNAF, 2019, ISBN 978-81-942408-0-8
- Songs from the Blood of the Weary (Dialogues of Peace): Rekha Rodwittiya, JNAF, 2018, ISBN 978-81-928046-8-2
- Laxman Shreshtha: The Infinite Project, JNAF, 2016, ISBN 978-81-928046-7-5
- The Journey is the Destination: The Artist’s Journey Between Then and Now, JNAF, 2016, ISBN 978-81-928046-6-8
- Ram Kumar: Works in the Jehangir Nicholson Collection, JNAF, 2015, ISBN 978-81-928046-5-1
- Kekoo, Kali & Jehangir: Framing a Collection, JNAF, 2014, ISBN 978-81-928046-3-7
- Voicing a Presence: Women Artists in the Jehangir Nicholson Collection, JNAF, 2013
- Nothing is Absolute: A journey through Abstraction, JNAF, 2013
- Jitish Kallat: Covering Letter, JNAF, 2016
