= K. G. Subramanyan =

Indian artist (1924–2016)

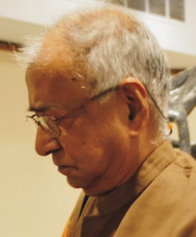
- K.G. Subramanyan 2008.
- Born: 5 February 1924; Kuthuparamba, Kerala, India
- Died: 29 June 2016 (aged 92); Vadodra, Gujarat, India
- Education: Visva-Bharati University
- Alma mater: Visva-Bharati University
- Occupations: Painter, sculptor, muralist, printmaker, writer, academic
- Movement: Contextual Modernism, Baroda Group
- Awards: Padma Shree, Kalidas Samman, Padma Bhushan, Padma Vibhushan

Kalpathi Ganpathi "K.G." Subramanyan (5 February 1924 – 29 June 2016) was an Indian artist. He was awarded the Padma Vibhushan in 2012.

== Life ==
Subramanyan was born in Tamil Brahmin family on 5 February 1924 in Kuthuparamba in Kerala, India, and initially studied economics at Presidency College, Madras. During the freedom struggle he was actively involved and was known for his Gandhian ideology. He was even imprisoned and later banned from joining government colleges during the British Rule. The turning point of his life, as an artist, came when he visited Santiniketan to study in Kala Bhavan, the art faculty of Visva Bharati University, in the year 1944. Under the tutelage of such pioneers of modern Indian art as Nandalal Bose, Benode Behari Mukherjee and Ramkinkar Baij, Subramanyan studied there until 1948.

In 1951 he became a lecturer at the Faculty of Fine Arts in M.S. University in Baroda. His contributions helped the Faculty of Fine Arts MSU Vadodara to gain Nationalist movement in Arts. He went to study briefly in London at the Slade School of Art as a British Council scholar in 1956. After returning to Baroda as a professor in painting and continuing there, he did a short stint in New York as a Rockefeller Fellow in 1966. In 1980, Subramanyan went back to Santiniketan to teach in his alma mater Kala Bhavan, Visva Bharati University, in his capacity as a professor in painting, which he continued till he retired in 1989. In the same year, he was made a Professor Emeritus of Visva Bharati.

Subramanyan resided in Baroda, with his daughter Uma, towards the later days of his life and it was here that he passed away there on 29 June 2016.

== Artistic styles and influences ==
A contemporary of the Progressives, his work drew on myths, fables, and traditional narratives across various mediums—from small terracotta reliefs to large murals. During the 1960s, his practice focused almost exclusively on still-lifes before transitioning to his notable Terrace series in the 1970s. Stylistically, his paintings combined these elements with a continued Cubist influence, featuring sensual imagery and reflective figures set against nightly backdrops.

K.G. Subramanyan was greatly influenced by folk art from Kerala, Kalighat painting and Pattachitra from Bengal and Odisha, as well as Indian court paintings.

== Retrospective show ==
There have been numerous retrospective shows of K.G. Subramanyan. K.G. Subramanyan, a Retrospective was the fourth and largest, curated by R. Siva Kumar at the National Gallery of Modern Art.

== Career ==
From 1951 to 59 Mr. Subramanyan was lecturer in painting, Faculty of Fine Arts, Baroda. He was the British Council Research Scholar, UK from 1955–56. He was Deputy Director (design), All India Handloom Board, Bombay from 1959 to 61 and Reader in Painting, Faculty of Fine Arts, Baroda from 1961 to 65.

- 1966–80 Professor of Painting, Faculty of Fine Arts, Baroda
- 1961–66 Design Consultant, All India
- 1966–67 Fellowship of The JDR III Fund, New York
- 1968–74 Dean, Faculty of Fine Arts, Baroda
- 1975 Elected to the World Crafts Council
- Delegate, Asian Assembly, World Craft Council, Sydney
- 1976 Member delegate, General Assembly, World Craft Council, Oaxtepec, Mexico
- Visiting lecturer, Canadian universities: Montreal, Ottawa, Hamilton
- 1977–78 Visiting Fellow, Kala Bhavan, Visva Bharati, Santiniketan
- 1980–89 Professor of Painting, Kala Bhavan, Visva Bharati, Santiniketan
- 1985 Guest, Chinese Artists Association, China
- 1987–88 Christensen Fellow, St. Catherine's College, Oxford
- 1989 Professor Emeritus, Kala Bhavan, Visva Bharati, Santiniketan
- 2004 Left Santiniketan and shifted back to Baroda in September.

== Students ==
Some of his students were Bhupen Khakhar, Ghulam Rasool Santosh, Gulam Mohammed Sheikh, Haku Shah, Jayant Parikh, Jyoti Bhatt, Jyotsna Bhatt, Laxma Goud, Mrinalini Mukherjee, Nilima Sheikh, Raghav Kaneria, Rajeev Lochan, Ratan Parimoo, Rekha Rodwittiya, Shanti Dave, Thota Vaikuntam, Vivan Sundaram.

== Honours and awards ==
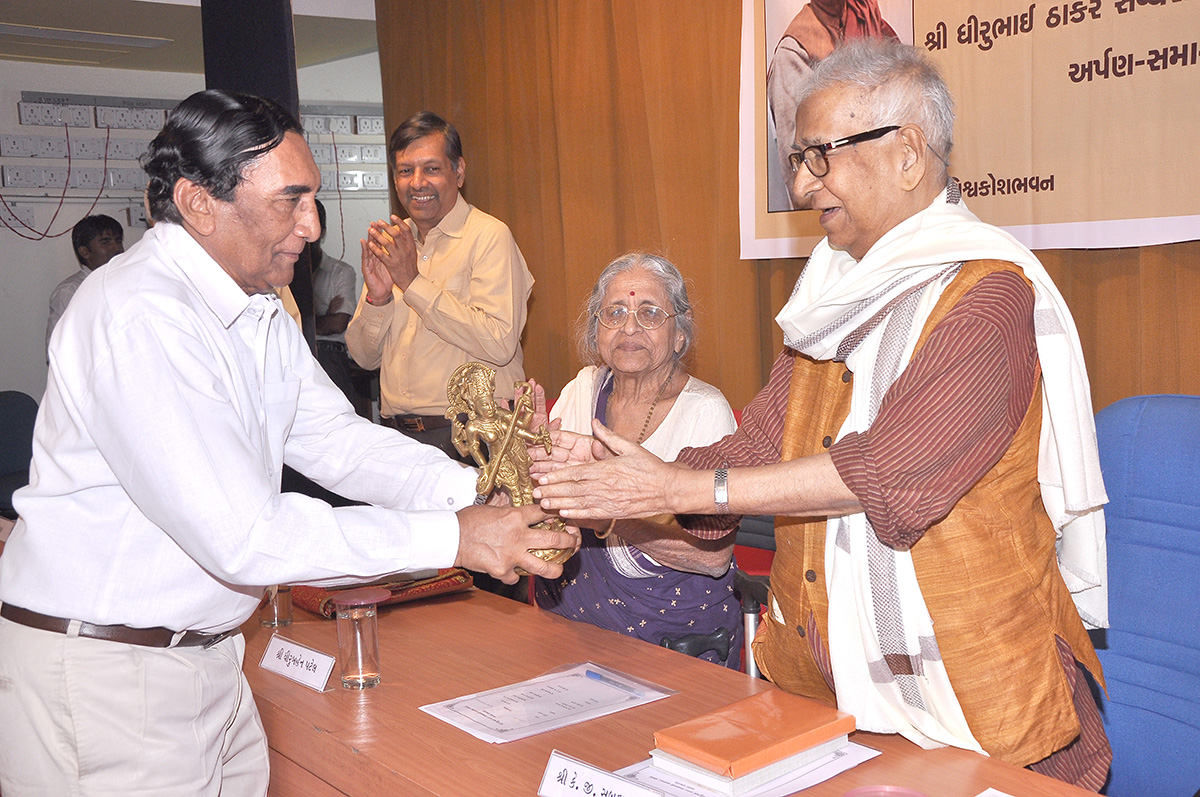
Kumarpal Desai presenting the Dhirubhai Thakar Savyasachi Saraswat Award to Subramanyan on 27 June 2015

- 1963: Medallion of Honourable Mention, São Paulo Biennale, Brazil
- 1965: National Award, Lalit Kala Akademi
- 1968: Gold Medal, The First International Triennale, New Delhi
- 1975: Padma Shri, Government of India
- 1991: Gagan-Aban Puraskar, Visva-Bharati University, Santiniketan
- 1992: D.Litt. (Honoris Causa), Rabindra Bharati University, Calcutta
- 2006: Awarded Padma Bhushan by the Government of India
- 2009: Awarded Dishikottam, Visva-Bharati University, Santiniketan
- 2011: Awarded D.Litt. (Honoris Causa), Assam University, Silchar.
- 2012: Awarded the Padma Vibhushan by the Government of India
- 2015: Awarded the Dhirubhai Thakar Savyasachi Saraswat Award

== Memberships and associations ==
- 1961–67 All India Board of Technical Studies in Applied Art
- 1961–65 Gujarat Lalit Kala Akademi
- 1967–79 Lalit Kala Akademi
- 1968–74 Gujarat Lalit Kala Akademi
- 1974–78 Member of the Governing Council, National Institute of Design, Ahmedabad
- 1981–84 Member Siksha-samiti and Karma-samiti of Visva Bharati, Santiniketan
- 1981–84 Member of the All India Handloom and Handicrafts Board

He has also been on the Board of studies of M.S. University, Baroda; Benaras Hindu University, Benaras; Punjab University, Chandigarh; College of Fine Arts, Trivadrum, Kerala; Faculty of Fine Arts, Bombay University; Rabindra Bharati University, Calcutta etc. and a member of the Editorial advisory Board of Leonardo.

== Works ==
=== Books ===
- 1978 Moving Focus: Essays on Indian Art, Lalit Kala Akademi, New Delhi. (Reissued by Seagull Books, Calcutta in 2006)
- 1987 The Living Tradition, Seagull Books, Calcutta
- 1992 The Creative Circuit, Seagull Books, Calcutta
- 2006 Translation of Benodebehari Mukherjee's Chitrakar, Seagull Books, Calcutta
- 2007 Poems, Seagull Books, Calcutta
- 2007 The Magic of Making: Essays on Art and Culture, Seagull Books, Calcutta

=== Illustrated books ===
- 1969 When God First Made the Animals He Made Them All Alike
- 1972 The Butterfly and the Cricket, A Summer Story, Robby
- 1974 Our Friends the Ogres, The King and the Little Man
- 1979 How Poppy Grew happy, Cat's Night and Day, Frog Life is Fun Life
- 1985 Of Ogres Beasts and Men (When God First Made the Animals He Made Them All Alike, Our Friends the Ogres, and The King and the Little Man reissued as a boxed set)
- 1995 How Hanu Became Hanuman, Death in Eden, In the Zoo (All three reissued in 1996)
- 1998 The Tale of the Talking Face

=== Murals ===
- 1955 Jyoti Ltd., Baroda Faculty of Fine Arts, Baroda
- 1963 'King of the Dark Chamber', Rabindralaya, Lucknow
- 1965 India Pavilion, New York World Fair, New York
- 1969 'India of my Dreams Pavilion', Gandhi Darshan, New Delhi
- 1976 R & D Building, Jyoti Pvt. Ltd., Baroda
- 1988 Sand cast Cement Mural, Kala Bhavan, Santiniketan
- 1989 Reverse painting on Glass Mural (with school children), Santiniketan
- 1990 Black and White Mural, Kala Bhavana, Santiniketan (first phase)
- 1993 Black and White Mural, Kala Bhavana, Santiniketan (second phase)
- 2009 Black and White Mural, Kala Bhavana, Santiniketan (2nd version)
