= Jayant Parikh =

Indian artist (born 1940)

- જયંત પરીખ
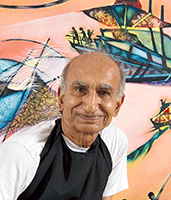
- Jayant Parikh in 2018
- Born: 2 April 1940 (age 86); Bandhni, Gujarat, India
- Known for: Painting, printmaker, muralist
- Movement: Baroda Group
- Spouse: Vidya Parikh
- Website: JayantParikh.com

Signature
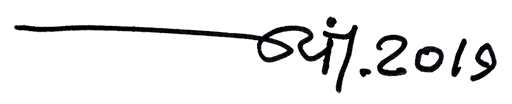
- Jayant Parikh's signature with year signed.

Jayant Parikh (born 2 April 1940) is an Indian modern contemporary artist, printmaker, and muralist. He is a student of N. S. Bendre, K. G. Subramanyan and Sankho Chaudhuri. He lives and works in Vadodara, India.

== Biography ==
Collagraphy print subject SpaceCraft presented in a most simple way using the natural texture of wood.

Ceramic mural on a wall with subject kites, using hard material such as ceramic tiles he created rhythm flow in subject and material.

Jayant Parikh was born on 2 April 1940 into a Gujarati Bania family in Bandhni village, Gujarat State, India. His family had a grocery shop in his village. He shifted to Vadodara in 1957 to study art at the Faculty of Fine Arts, Maharaja Sayajirao University, Vadodara.

In 1962, he acquired his Post Diploma in Painting under the teaching of N. S. Bendre. As an extra subject, he studied woodcut in graphics. Later on, he also learned etching and colorography.

He was a temporary lecturer in the faculty of fine arts M.S. University in 1970 for the painting department and in 1980 for the graphics department for one year short duration each time. He also had more than 74 one-man shows.

=== Works ===
His work has sold at auction houses such as Christie's, Sotheby's, and Dominic Winter Auctioneers. At Christie's his artwork sold at 5,250 USD along with Bhupen Khakhar, Nasreen Mohamedi, Gulam Mohammed Sheikh, K. G. Subramanyan, Jyoti Bhatt, etc.

At Osian's auction house, his painting price was proposed from 13,335 USD to 16,950 USD.

- The Vintage Celebration painting sold for $2,594 USD at the Giftex auction house Modern & Contemporary Art Auction on April 26-27, 2026.
- The Morning Prayer painting sold for $2,565 USD at the Giftex auction house Modern & Contemporary Art Auction on June 26-27, 2026.
- The Fourth Dimension painting sold for $3,756 USD at the Giftex auction house Modern & Contemporary Art Auction on August 22-23, 2026.
- The Fishermen painting sold for $4,998 USD at the Giftex auction house Modern & Contemporary Art Auction on August 22-23, 2026.
- The Target painting sold for $6,071 USD at the Giftex auction house Modern & Contemporary Art Auction on September 16-17 2026.
- The Dessert painting sold for $7,539 USD at the Giftex auction house Modern & Contemporary Art Auction on September 16-17, 2026.

=== Artist style and influence ===
Parikh started his work initially as abstract: he practised Cubism for one year. For this short duration of time, he was influenced by the art of Pablo Picasso. Later, after 1970, he created his own style of painting, calling it Rhythm. Since his beginnings, his favourite subject remains Indian monuments and archaeological sites. He has always painted his art either on-site of his reference monument, or he paints a sketch and from that reference, he paints in his studio. Since 1970 he found the fourth dimension in his artwork which is motion, which he calls Rhythm. His art is influenced by nature, and he feels that he paints that rhythm in his painting.

== Collection ==
His works are held in the collections of the following:

- Chester and Davida Herwitz collection, famously known as the Herwitz collection,
- Chemould Art Gallery.
- Taj Hotels (including in the TATA Presidential Suite at The Taj Mahal Palace Hotel, Mumbai)
- Ghalib Academy, New Delhi
- National Gallery of Modern Art (in New Delhi, Mumbai and Bangaluru);
- Jehangir Nicholson Art Foundation, Chhatrapati Shivaji Maharaj Vastu Sangrahalaya, Mumbai;
- Lalit Kala Akademi, New Delhi.
- Air India
- Feoil Fine Art, USA.
- Marianna Kistler Beach Museum of Art, Kansas State University, USA.
- Prafulla Dahanukar Art Foundation (PDAF)

== Awards and honours ==
- 1959 Bronze medal at Bombay Art Society
- 1960 Kalidas Exhibition Award
- 1960 All India Khadi Certificate of merits
- 1960 Award by Jammu and Kashmir
- 1961 The Governor of Maharashtra's prize Bombay Art Society
- 1961 Kalidas Exhibition Award
- 1961 Award by All India Radio
- 1961 Gold medal at Indore
- 1962 Gujarat Lalit Kala Award
- 1962 Diploma of Merit at first international art exhibition in Saigon
- 1962 Hydrabad Art Society Award
- 1963 Gujarat Lalit Kala Award
- 1963 Hydrabad Art Society Award
- 1963 Kalidas Exhibition Award
- 1963 Government of India scholarship from 1963 to 1965
- 1964 Kalidas Exhibition Award
- 1965 Gujarat Lalit Kala Award
- 1965 Gold medal at International book and art exhibition Leipzig Germany
- 1965 Hydrabad Art Society Award
- 1965 Kalidas Exhibition Award
- 1966 Kalidas Exhibition Award
- 1969 Two Awards by Railway
- 1970 Gujarat Lalit Kala Award
- 1970 National award for painting Lalit Kala Akademi, New Delhi
- 1971 Gujarat Lalit Kala Award
- 1974 Gujarat Lalit Kala Award
- 1979 Gujarat Lalit Kala Award
- 1980 National award for graphic Lalit Kala Akademi, New Delhi
- 2008 Gujarat Gaurav Puraskar by Gujarat State Lalit Kala Academi
- 2017 Raja Ravi Varma Award by Megh Mandal Sansthan, Ministry of Culture, Govt. of India.
- 2022 The Raja Ravi Varma Award for Excellence in the Field of Visual Arts by the Maharaja Ranjitsinh Gaekwad Charities.

== Exhibitions ==
Jayant Parikh has participated in numerous biennales, triennials, group exhibits, and solo art exhibitions around the world.

=== Biennales ===
- 1965 - IV Biennale de Paris, Paris France

=== Triennials ===
- 1975 - Third Triennale-India – Lalit Kala Akademi, New Delhi

=== Art Fair ===
- 2008 - India Art Summit 2008: India's Modern & Contemporary Art Fair
- 2012 - Mumbai Art Fair Nehru Centre Worli, Mumbai

=== Group shows ===
- 1961 - Baroda Group of Artists: Fifth Annual Exhibition of Paintings was held at Roopa Gallery, Taj Mahal Palace Hotel, Mumbai, from 25 to 31 January 1961.
- 2009 - 22 September 2009—San Qi, at the Four Seasons Hotel, Worli Mumbai.
- 2016 - Aura art show timeless masterpieces at 23 to 30 November 2016 at Hutheesing, Visual Art Centre, Ahmedabad.
- 2017 - DAG Curated by Paula Sengupta at Jawahar Kala Kendra from 8 Aug to 6 Oct 2017 at Jaipur.
- 2017 - Faculty of Fine Arts, Maharaja Sayajirao University, Vadodara, on 18 April 2017.

=== Solo exhibitions ===
Jayant Parikh had 87 solo exhibitions till February 2024.

- 1966 - Taj Art Gallery, Taj Mahal Palace Hotel Mumbai - 1 March to 7 March 1966.
- 1967 - Taj Art Gallery, Taj Mahal Palace Hotel Mumbai - 21 November to 27 November.
- 1969 - Taj Art Gallery, Taj Mahal Palace Hotel Mumbai - 1 to 7 April 1969.
- 1969 - Pundol Art Gallery Mumbai - 8 December to 18 December 1969.
- 1972 - Taj Art Gallery, Taj Mahal Palace Hotel Mumbai - 3ed October to 9 October.
- 1975 - Taj Art Gallery, Taj Mahal Palace Hotel Mumbai - 25 November to 1 December.
- 1977 - Taj Art Gallery, Taj Mahal Palace Hotel Mumbai - December 1977.
- 1979 - Taj Art Gallery, Taj Mahal Palace Hotel Mumbai - November 1979.
- 1980 - Contemporary Art Gallery Ahmedabad - 20 April to 25 April 1980.
- 1982 - Taj Art Gallery, Taj Mahal Palace Hotel Mumbai - March 1983.
- 1990 - Taj Art Gallery, Taj Mahal Palace Hotel Mumbai - 27 February to 5 March.
- 2003 - Exhibition of paintings on Goa by Jayant Parikh, Jehangir Art Gallery, till 23 April.
- 2007 - Sarjan Art Gallery Vadodara - Voyage Into Historic Past.
- 2024 - Sarjan Art Gallery Vadodara. - 8 Feb 2024 – 24 Feb 2024.

== Fellowship ==
- 2005 - Government senior fellowship by government of India.

== Publication ==
- Print-making in India Today 1985 by Jehangir Art Gallery, Mumbai.
- Contemporary Graphics in India by Author Ratan Parimoo.
- Graphic art in India since 1850 by Lalit Kala Akademi, New Delhi.
- Printmaking History, A Survey Techniques and Artists by Kaumudi Prajapati.
- Trends and Transitions in Indian Art, Marg (magazine), Special Edition.

== Artist Camp ==
Jayant Parikh had participated All India Artist camp at madras from 24-03-1980 to 31-03-1980 organized by Lalit Kala Akademi.

== Workshop ==
- A six-day workshop will be held under the guidance of eminent artist printmaker Jayant Parikh at the Department of Graphic Arts of The Maharaja Sayajirao University, Faculty of Fine Arts on 24 September 2018.
- Jayant Parikh participated as a coordinator in the workshop of collagraphy at the National Printmaking and Painting Workshop, State University of Performing Art, The Maharaja Sayajirao University of Baroda.

== See also ==
- Baroda Group
- List of printmakers
- List of Indian artists
- List of Indian painters
- List of Maharaja Sayajirao University of Baroda people
