= N. S. Bendre =

Indian artist (1910–1992)

Narayan Shridhar Bendre
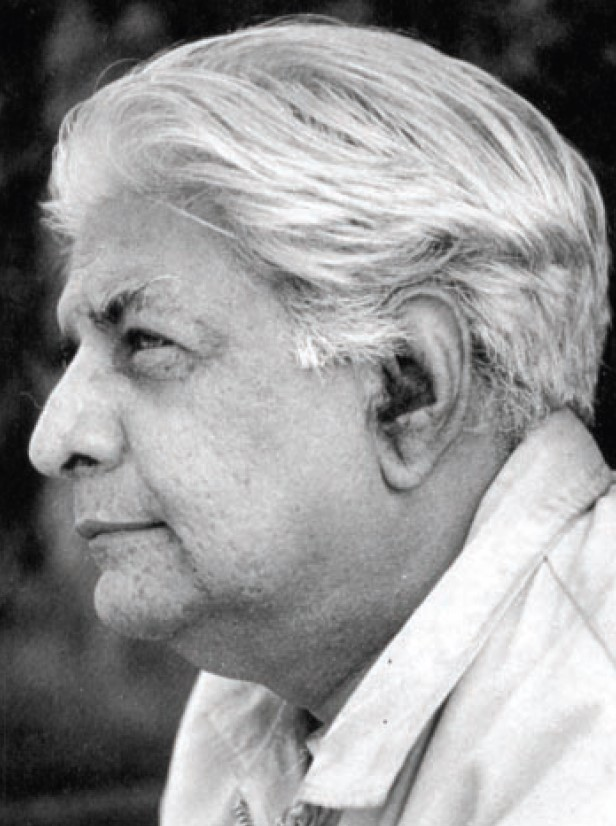
- Born: Narayan Shridhar Bendre; 21 August 1910; Indore, Madhya Pradesh, British India
- Died: 19 February 1992 (aged 81); Mumbai, Maharashtra, India
- Awards: Padma Bhushan (1992); Padma Shri (1969)

Narayan Shridhar Bendre (21 August 1910 – 19 February 1992) was an Indian artist and one of the founding members of Baroda Group Born in Indore, he was known for his landscape artistry. In 1992, he was awarded the Padma Bhushan.

== Early life and education ==
Narayan Shridhar Bendre was born in a Deshastha Rigvedi Brahmin family on 21 August 1910 in Indore, Madhya Pradesh. In 1933, he earned a Bachelor of Arts degree from Agra University. During the same period, he pursued formal training in art at the State School of Art in Indore under the tutelage of Dattatraya Damodar Deolalikar. In 1934, he completed an Art Diploma under the then Government of Bombay.

== Career ==
=== Early career and international travels (1936–1950) ===
From 1936 to 1939, Bendre served as an artist-journalist for the Visitors' Bureau of the Kashmir government. In 1940, he worked as an art director for a motion picture in Chennai. His professional travels allowed him extensive opportunities to capture natural landscapes in his work. He also made regular visits to historical sites, museums, and art organizations throughout India. In 1946, he spent time at Santiniketan as a visiting artist.

Between 1947 and 1950, Bendre traveled globally to study the international art world, visiting nations including Great Britain, the United States, France, Holland, West Germany, Italy, Egypt, Lebanon, Jordan, Iraq, Iran, Afghanistan, and Japan. During this period, he studied drawing and graphic arts at the Art Students League of New York under the supervision of art expert Armin Landeck. He also organized exhibitions of his artworks in several of the countries he visited.

=== Academic career and later years ===
In 1952, Bendre was chosen as a painter to accompany India's first official cultural delegation to China. From 1950 to 1960, he worked at the Maharaja Sayajirao University of Baroda as a professor of painting, later serving as the Dean of the Faculty of Fine Arts. After retiring from his position in Baroda, he relocated to Mumbai, where he permanently settled to work as a professional painter.

== Artistic style and works ==
Bendre is recognized as an experimental artist who resisted the restrictions of any single school or specific tradition of painting. His diverse artistic footprint is visible across multiple stylistic phases:

- Romanticism: Exemplified by his early work Vagabond (1933).
- Cubism: Reflected through his distinct methodology in Sunflowers (1955).
- Abstract Expressionism: Displayed in works such as Entwined Form (1962).
- Neo-Realism: Demonstrated in his figurative neo-realist piece Bhil Couple (1980).

Bendre's paintings are preserved in numerous art collections both across India and internationally, and he held frequent exhibitions of his work within India.

== Institutional associations ==
Bendre maintained close ties with many well-known art institutions and took on several administrative roles:

- Art Society of India: Served as the president of the society for three years.
- Lalit Kala Akademi (Delhi): Served as the Vice Chairman of the fine arts branch from 1962 to 1972.
- Bombay Art Society: Served as the Vice President during the intervals of 1972–1973 and 1977–1978.

== Awards and honours ==
In 1955, Bendre received the National Award from the Lalit Kala Akademi for his work, Thorn. In 1969, he received the Padma Shri award and in 1992, he received the Padma Bhushan award. In 1974, he received the fellowship of the Lalit Kala Academy. In 1984, the Visva Bharati University conferred him the Aban-Gagan Award and Madhya Pradesh state government conferred him the Kalidas Samman (1986–87).

Bendre received numerous accolades from institutional, state, and national bodies:

- Bombay Art Society: Awarded the silver medal in 1933 and the gold medal in 1941.

Art Society of India: Received the Art Society of India Trophy/Cup in 1943.

- Patel Cup: Awarded in 1946.
- Governor's Awards: Awarded on multiple occasions.
- Padma Shri: Conferred by the Government of India in 1969.
- Lalit Kala Akademi Fellowship: Awarded an honorary fellowship in 1974.
- State honours: Honored with Tamrapatras (copper plates) by the state governments of Gujarat and Madhya Pradesh.
- Marathi Sahitya Sabha (Mumbai): Honored with a gold medal.
- Honorary doctorate: Awarded an honorary Doctor of Letters (D.Litt.) degree by the Indira Kala Sangeet Vishwavidyalaya in Khairagarh, Madhya Pradesh.

== Notable works ==
Hairdo (1949), "The Sunflower" (1955), "Monkey" (1957), "The Cow and the Calf" (1948), "The Female Cowherd" (1956), "Homebound", "The Bullock Cart" and "Gossip"

== Students ==
Students of his included Balkrishna Patel, Ghulam Rasool Santosh, Gulam Mohammed Sheikh, Haku Shah, Jayant Parikh, Jyoti Bhatt, Kamudben Patel, Naina Dalal, Shri Ranjitsinh Pratapsinh Gaekwad, Ratan Parimoo, Shanti Dave, Triloke Kaul.
