= Rekha Rodwittiya =

Indian artist (born 1958)

Rekha Rodwittiya (born 31 October 1958) is a contemporary Indian artist associated with the Baroda School. She is known for her allegorical and metaphoric narrative paintings depicted through the style of surrealism and magical realism. She conducts an art studio in Vadodara called The Collective Studio, jointly with her husband and artist Surendran Nair.

== Biography ==
Rekha was born on 31 October 1958, in the city of Bangalore, Karnataka. She grew up for the most part in the city of Baroda (later renamed to Vadodara), where her family moved to in 1967. Rekha was the younger of two sisters and her parents were South India while she was looked after mostly by her mother as her father was an Indian air force pilot.

She joined the fine arts academy of the Maharaja Sayajirao University of Baroda in 1976, at a time when the city of witnessing the emergence of a hipster culture and the rise of a number of pre-eminent contemporary artists such as Bhupen Khakhar, Gulam Mohammed Sheikh and Jyoti Bhatt. In 1977, she married a friend from Thailand who was a foreign student at the university and had a child in the following year named Mithun. Rodwittiya states that the marriage occurred with the expressed permission of her parents, and that she was diagnosed with infertility issues and recommended to conceive as soon as possible if she were to have a child. The marriage broke down while she was pregnant which led to divorce and her becoming a single mother while still in college.

In 1981, she graduated with a Bachelor of Arts in painting and was enrolled in the Master of Arts programme for an year. Following her graduation, Rodwittiya also began working at a private studio run by Jyoti Bhatt. She began painting independently with a series of small imaginary portrait, and was soon recognised as a talent. In 1982, the British Council granted her a fellowship to complete her Master of Fine Arts in painting at the Royal College of Art, London, which she earned in 1984. Other than Bhatt, she was also mentored by the British artist Peter de Francia who was a professor at the Royal College and the Indian artist Nasreen Mohamedi, who is considered as "India's greatest abstract artist" and was a faculty at the MS University of Baroda. During this period, her parents began to take care of her son which allowed her to continue her education.

On returning to India, Rodwittiya received a teaching appointment at the MS University of Baroda but it not renewed due to her outspoken feminist views which were considered controversial. She also met the artist Surendran Nair during this time, who became a close friend of hers and eventually married her in 1985.
