= Maharaja Sayajirao University of Baroda Faculty of Fine Arts =

Art school at Maharaja Sayajirao University of Baroda

Faculty of Fine Arts
- Affiliations: Maharaja Sayajirao University of Baroda
- Location: Vadodara, Gujarat, India; 22°18′43″N 73°11′12″E
- Website: http://www.msubaroda.ac.in/

The Faculty of Fine Arts, Maharaja Sayajirao University of Baroda is one of the major art colleges in India. It has a reputation for promoting a creative and individualist approach among its students, and has historically adhered to secularist, humanist, and modernist ideals.

== Early history ==
In 1881, the famous Indian painter Raja Ravi Varma was invited to the princely state of Baroda by the Maharaja Sayajirao Gaekwad III belonging the royal Gaekwad dynasty of the Marathas. Varma was treated with great respect by the Gaekwad court. Besides commissioned portraits of Maharaja Gaekwad III, he produced several other fine canvases during his stay. His visit is generally credited as a motivating force in the creation of The Baroda Museum under the patronage of Maharaja Sayajirao, which began construction in 1887 and was completed in 1894. During the years 1903 and 1904, the Maharajah and the new director of this museum, Mr. A.M. Masani, toured the museums and galleries of Europe and purchased in excess of twenty rare paintings plus numerous other art objects.

The Baroda College of Science was established in 1881 by the Maharaja, and developed into a full-fledged degree institution in 1889. The idea of establishing a separate university for Baroda was first advanced as early as 1927 by Sir Sayajirao himself. It came into existence on 30 April 1949, at the time of the merger of the Baroda State with the State of Bombay. Necessary changes were incorporated into the constitution of the Baroda College with a view to establishing separate Faculties in the university. Thus, the Baroda College, one of the oldest Centers of learning in western India, came to include the Faculty of Fine Arts. At the beginning, the courses that the Faculty offered includes painting, sculpture, applied arts, art history, music, dance, and architecture.

The vice-chancellor of the new university, Hansa Mehta, believed in a liberal, literate, academic climate, where constructive engagement and open dialogue would ensure full intellectual discourse and intellectual growth. She used her own resources to solicit the help of Markand Bhatt from the Barnes Foundation in Philadelphia to help in the initial setting up of the Faculty of Fine Arts. Major figures in Indian art were invited to join the new project. They included K.K. Hebbar, V.P. Karmarkar and the eminent Indianologist Hermann Goetz. Others who were early involved with the new faculty were N. S. Bendre and K.G. Subramanyan.

== Achievements ==
Over the years the Faculty of Fine Arts, MSU Baroda, became synonymous with modernist art practices and experimentation in India. In 1956 "The Baroda Group", which included artists such as N. S. Bendre, Jyoti Bhatt, Prafull Dave, Shanti Dave, K.G. Subramanyan, and Jayant Parikh held their first exhibition in Bombay. The Baroda Group continued with exhibitions that received attention throughout India and also in the west. Soon the Faculty of Fine Arts was to attract the likes of artists such as Laxma Goud and Nasreen Mohammedi. Senior artists of Baroda, such as Sankho Chaudhuri, continued to live there and teach.

Over the decades artists from the Faculty of Fine Arts went on to participate in exhibitions worldwide, such as the Paris Biennale, the São Paulo Biennale, and the Tokyo Biennale. Many of India's best known and historically respected artists have their roots in the Faculty of Fine Arts.
