= You Can't Please All =

1981 painting by Bhupen Khakhar

You Can’t Please All
- Artist: Bhupen Khakhar
- Year: 1981
- Medium: Oil on canvas
- Dimensions: 175.6 cm × 175.6 cm (69.1 in × 69.1 in)
- Location: Tate, London

You Can't Please All is an oil on canvas painting by Indian artist Bhupen Khakhar (1934–2003). Khakhar, famously recognized as India's first pop artist, completed the painting in 1981 in Baroda, Gujarat. The painting took him five months to finish.

== Background ==
An openly gay artist, Khakhar's works were very figurative in nature, and explored the themes of gender, identity, sexuality, humour, love and relationship, among others. His paintings often contained references to Hindu mythology and mythological themes.

A self-taught artist, Khakhar painted one of his most significant works, You Can't Please All, in 1981. The painting is widely regarded as his 'coming out' statement, as homosexuality became a recurring theme in his paintings following it. The painting was published at a time when homosexuality was looked down upon and condemned in India. Likely a self-portrait, Khakhar's work reflected courage, pride, colour and liberation.

== Title ==
The title of the painting is an allusion to a folktale called You Can't Please Everyone from Aesop's Fables, a story about two men carrying a donkey and ultimately losing it by accident as they attempt to pay heed to the advice of every person who comes across them. The painting, set in an Indian town, shows three episodes from the tale.

== Overview ==
You Can't Please All is an oil on canvas painting and employs lots of colours. The painting has two main sections: on the left is a bustling town, full of garages, cafes and alleyways; on the right stands a naked man leaning over his balcony, looking down at the townspeople. The town is busy, showcasing several scenes: a man repairing his car, a woman plucking fruits from a tree, a group of men sitting at the porch of a house, and three distinct episodes from the titular fable. The man, presumed to be a self-portrait of Khakhar, watches over the townscape as he finds himself in a dilemma as to whether he should participate in society or hide from it. The painting explores the conflict between conventional wisdom and individuality, and challenges social taboos vis-à-vis homosexuality. The title aptly summarizes the subject of the painting: one cannot make everyone happy.

In the painting, the figure shows his nude posterior to the viewer, a position which resembles that of the subject in David Hockney's 1966 artwork, Peter Getting Out of Nick's Pool.

The painting, which is defined by colours and contrasts, has varying levels of thickness of paint. Although the surface is relatively smooth, some brush strokes are visible.

You Can't Please All was acquired by Tate in 1996.
