= Ranjitsinh Pratapsinh Gaekwad =

Ranjitsinh Gaekwad
- Titular Maharaja of Baroda

Baroda State
- Tenure: 1988 – 2012
- Coronation: 1988
- Predecessor: Fatehsinghrao Gaekwad
- Successor: Samarjitsinh Gaekwad

Member of Parliament, Lok Sabha
- In office 1980–1989
- Preceded by: Fatehsinghrao Gaekwad
- Succeeded by: Prakash Koko Brahmbhatt
- Constituency: Baroda

Personal details
- Born: 8 May 1938 Ootacamund, Madras Presidency, British India
- Died: 10 May 2012 (aged 74) Vadodara, Gujarat, India
- Party: Indian National Congress
- Spouse: Shubhanginiraje
- Parents: Pratap Singh Rao Gaekwad (father); Maharani Shantadevi Gaekwad (mother)

Ranjitsinhrao Gaekwad (8 May 1938 – 10 May 2012) was an Indian politician.

== Early life and education ==
Born 8 May 1938 at Ootacamund, Ranjitsinhrao Gaekwad was the second son of Maharaja Pratap Singh Rao Gaekwad (r. 1939–1951), and Maharani Shantadevi Gaekwad (died 2002), daughter of Sardar Hausrkar Mansinhrao Subbarao of Hasur in Kolhapur. Her daughter, Mrunalini Devi Puar was the Chancellor of The Maharaja Sayajirao University of Baroda. He also obtained post graduate degree in fine arts from Maharaja Sayajirao University of Baroda.

He was the younger brother of Fatehsinghrao Gaekwad, who was the titular Maharaja of Baroda from 1951 to 1971. In the 26th amendment to the Constitution of India promulgated in 1971, the Government of India abolished all official symbols of princely India, including titles, privileges, and remuneration (privy purses).

== Career ==
Gaekwad was a member of the Indian National Congress and was elected to the Lok Sabha for two terms from Baroda from 1980 to 1989. Ranjitsinhrao Gaekwad was also a well-known painter.

In 2009, Gaekwad accepted a fellowship as artist-in-residence at Durham University's Institute of Advanced Study in north-east England. During the fellowship, he created the sculpture Vessels of Life, which is installed in the university's botanic garden.

== Death ==
Ranjitsinh died on 10 May 2012, aged 74, in Vadodara.

== Legacy ==
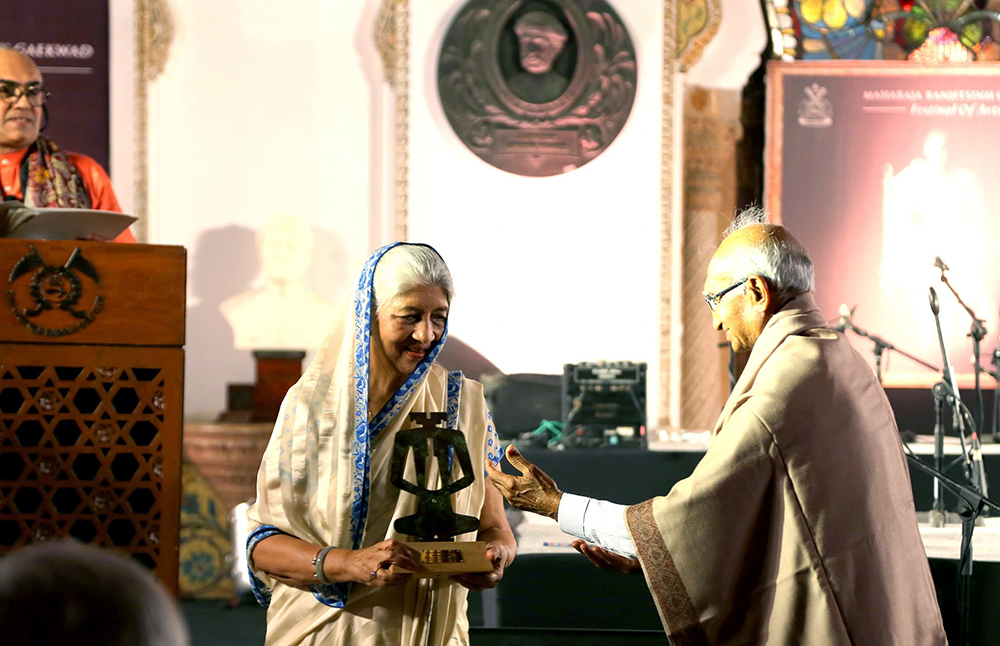
The Raja Ravi Varma Award for Excellence in the Field of Visual Arts was presented to veteran artist Jayant Parikh by Shubhanginiraje Gaekwad and posthumously to artists late Jyotsna Bhatt and late Rini Dhumal.

A two days festival of The Maharaja Ranjitsinh Gaekwad Festival of Arts is annually organized, in his memory at the Durbar Hall in Laxmi Vilas Palace. This festival celebrates the spirit of Ranjitsinh Gaekwad’s life as an artist and musician many prominent artists like Ustad Fazal Qureshi, Anand Bhate, Sukhad Mande, and many more live performances.

A scholarship is also given to meritorious MSU Faculty of Performing Arts students.
