= Ramesh Pateria =

Indian sculptor

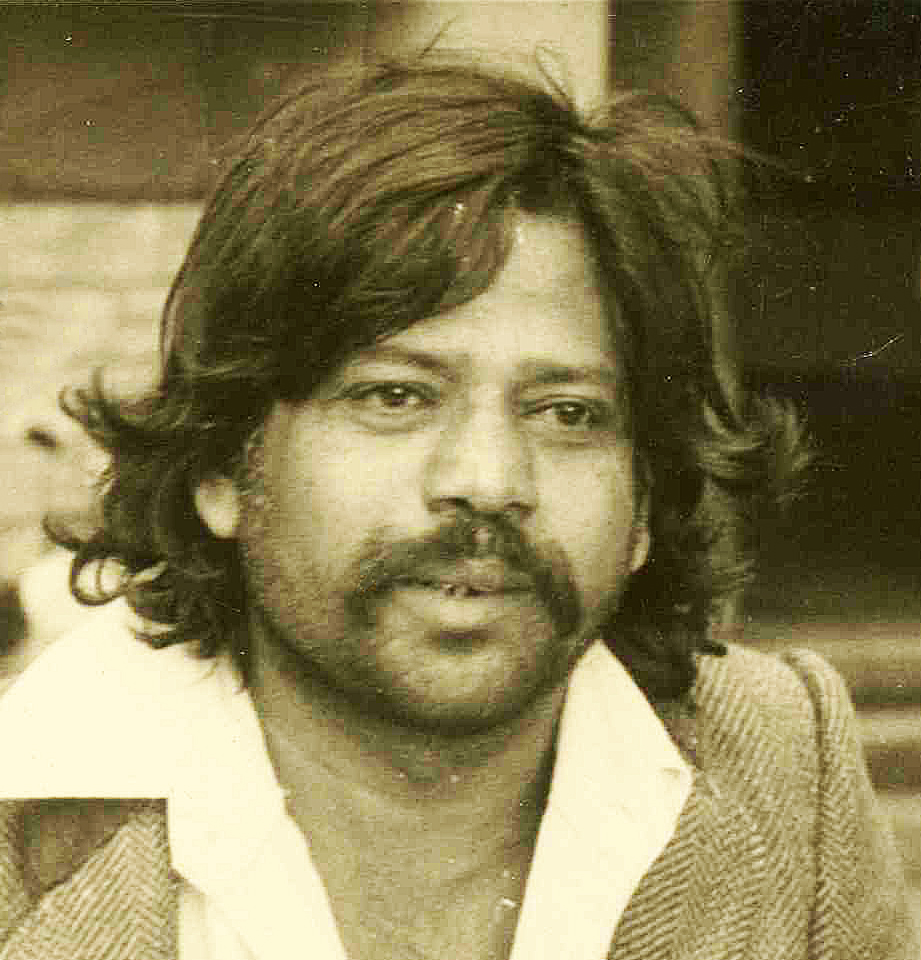
- Ramesh Pateria in 1965
- Born: 1937; Jabalpur, Madhya Pradesh, India
- Died: 1987 (aged 49–50)
- Education: College of Fine Arts, Baroda, Gujarat
- Occupation: Sculptor
- Notable work: Sculptures in solid marble rock
- Awards: National Award, Lalit Kala Academy, New Delhi (1969) Shikhar Award, Madhya Pradesh Government (1982–83)

Ramesh Pateria (or Pateriya) (1937–1987) was an Indian sculptor, known for his work in solid marble rock. He won many National and State Awards. His sculptures are in the National Gallery of Modern Art, Lalit Kala Academy and many other private and institutional collectors.

== Personal life ==
Pateria was born in Jabalpur Madhya Pradesh, India in 1937. He took his formal education and graduation from the College of Fine Arts in Baroda, Gujarat. He sculpted marble rocks with modern abstract shapes with strong lines. His work attracted attention and earned him scholarships from Madhya Pradesh State 1964–65, and Cultural Scholarship from Ministry of Education Govt. of India 1967–69. He taught art to children at the Modern School, New Delhi in 1971–72. He then secured British Council Scholarship to study sculpture at the Portsmouth Polytechnic in U.K. during 1972–73 and painting at the Royal College of Art, London in 1973–74. He had a number of shows to his credit and he is featured in a book on Indian Sculpture

== Description of Pateria's sculptures ==
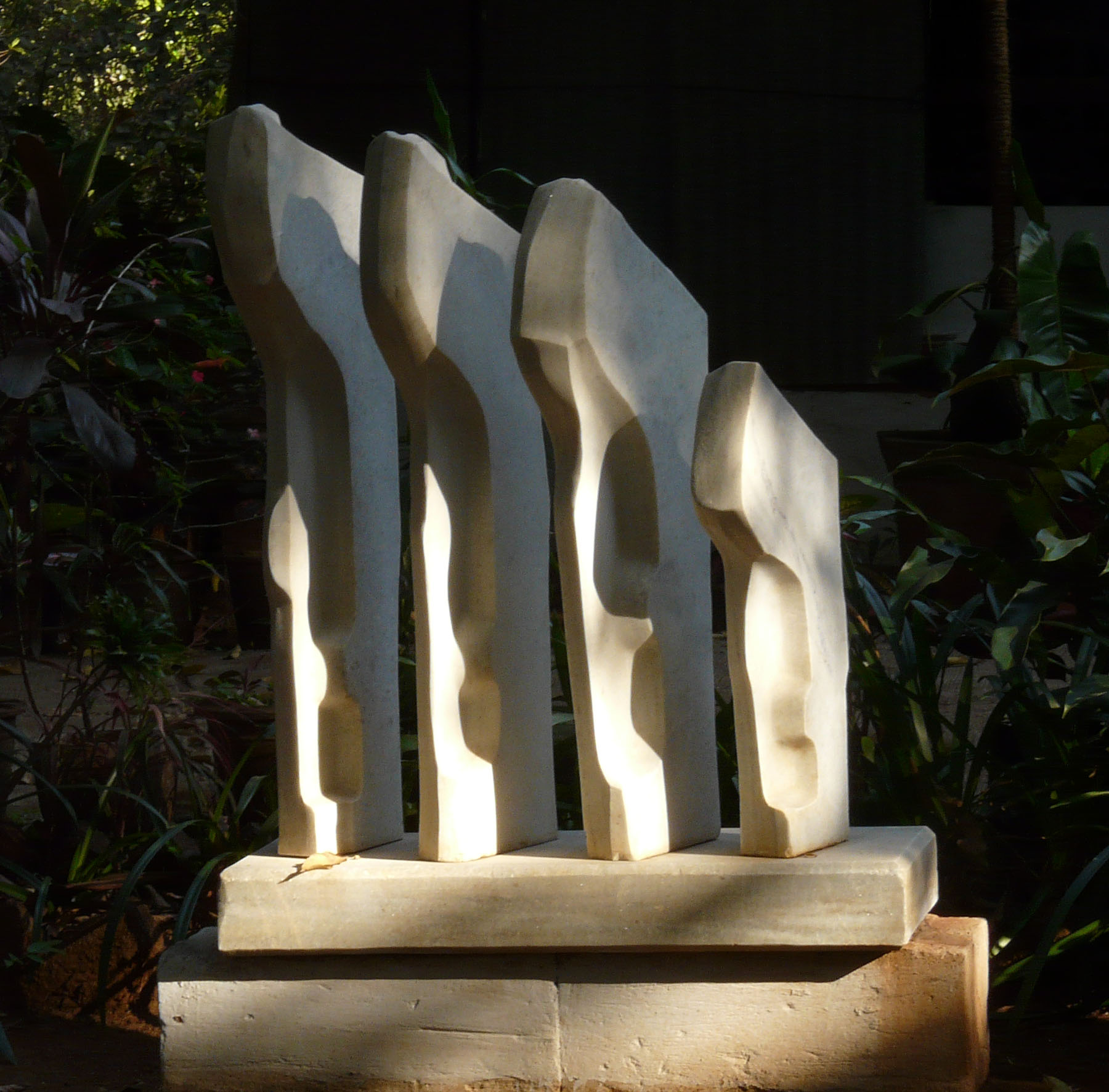
Family; Marble Sculpture by Ramesh Pateria

Pateria mostly created art objects which were 3 to 6 feet in size. Except for a few works in wood, his sculptures were created in marble. White, Pink and black marbles were his favorite. He used the natural design of lines of the marble stock to create bold carved forms which won him many awards.

== Honours and awards ==
Pateria won a number of Awards. Notable among them were National Award, Lalit Kala Academy, New Delhi, 1969, and the Shikhar Award, Madhya Pradesh Government, 1982–83 He also won Awards at Gujarat State exhibition, Madhya Pradesh Kala Parishad at Kalidas Art Exhibition, Ujjain,
