= Thota Vaikuntam =

Indian painter (born 1942)

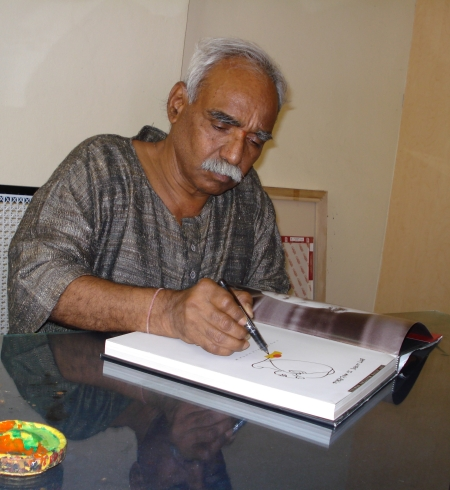
- Born: 1942 (age 83–84); Burugupalli, Telangana, India
- Known for: Painting

Thota Vaikuntam (born 1942) is an Indian painter. His paintings capture simple lifestyle of villagers like the paddy fields, toddy pots on shoulders of men, the household chores, temple rituals etc. His drawings range from stark charcoal on paper, transparent washes and pencil drawings.

== Early life and background ==
Vaikuntam was born in Burugupalli, Karimnagar district, Telangana. His father used to run a grocery shop.

He studied at the College of Fine Arts and Architecture, Hyderabad and Painting and Printmaking, Faculty of Fine Arts, Maharaja Sayajirao University of Baroda (on a Lalit Kala Akademi Fellowship from Andhra Pradesh). He was under the tutelage of K. G. Subramanyan at Baroda.

The love for women in his paintings can be traced back to his childhood fascination of the impersonations of women characters by the male artists of the theatre groups performing in his village.

== Career ==
Vaikuntam paints men and women from the Telangana region. The subjects are depicted in sarees and attire that includes vermilion bindis.

The stylisation of a painting are a perfect foil to Indian classical dance as the figures seem to dance, as if following their creator in a statuesque movement, reminiscent of temple friezes. He uses the brightest of reds and yellows. The simple women become larger than life as they fill the small format of his paintings draped in bright Sircilla saris.

I like using rich primary colours, which give a sense of character and depth to my paintings. Like reds and saffron and even orange, because these are essentially Indian colours. I don't like using colours that are mix of two, because they are not natural, they don't exist in surroundings around us, in our everyday life. - T. Vaikuntam

He worked as art director for the film, Daasi (1988), and received a National award. He also worked on Maa Bhoomi (1979) and Matti Manushulu (1990). A film was made based on his story as Rangula Kala, which displayed the range of his work as young upcoming painter.

== Personal life ==
Vaikuntam is married and has two sons and a daughter.

== Awards ==
- Bharat Bhavan Biennale Award, Bhopal
- National Award, Govt. of India
- State Award
