= Victoria Memorial Hall, Karnal =

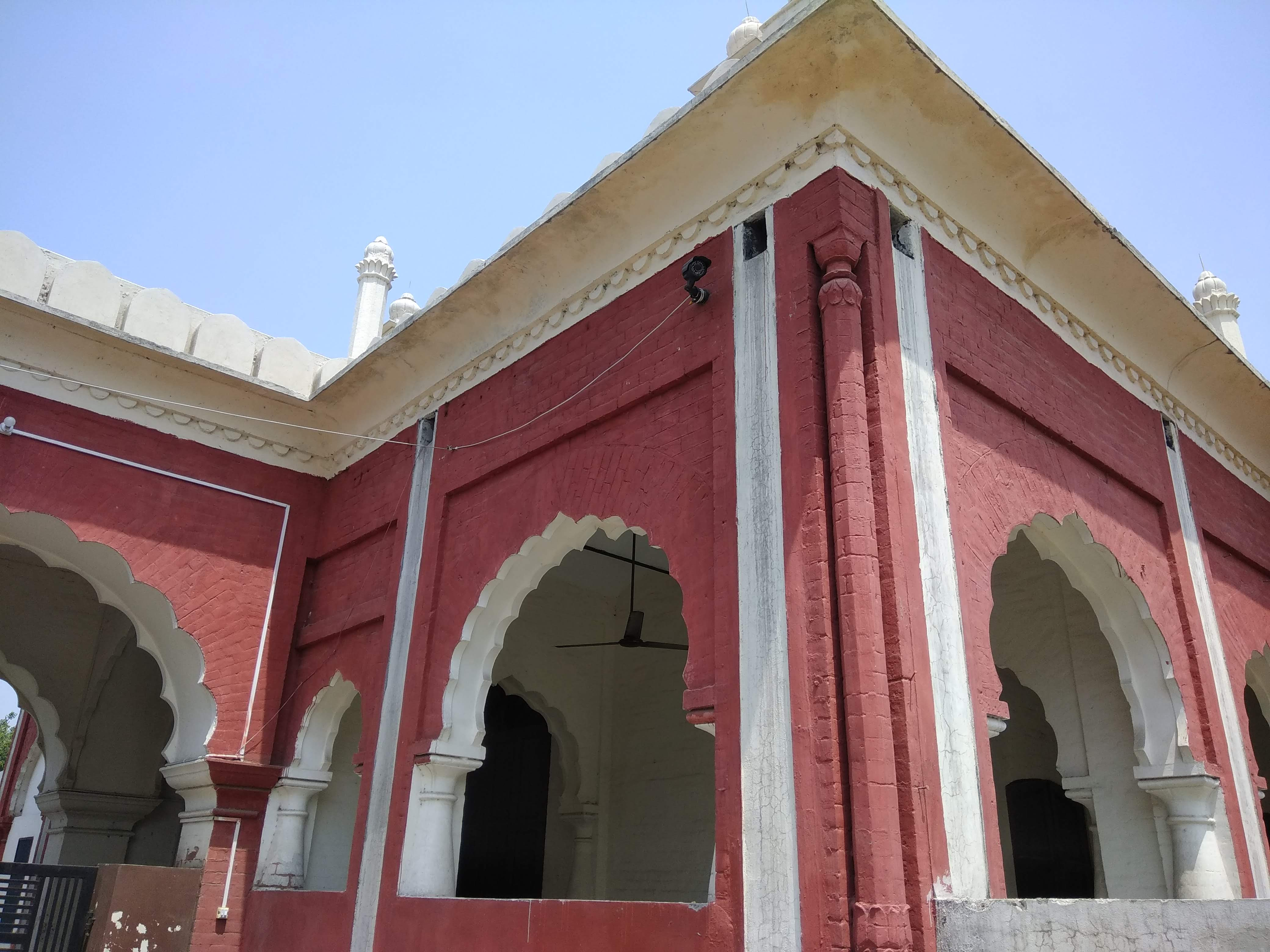
- Location: G.T. Road, Karnal, Haryana -132001
- Country: India

History
- Founded: 1906

Administration
- District: Karnal

The Victoria Memorial Hall is situated in Karnal city of Haryana, India. It stands near the city's Committee Chowk, Karnal, OLD National Highway 1 of India. The monument is located in the main market of Karnal City. This monument is listed as "State Protected Monuments" by the Department of Archaeology and Museums, Haryana..

== History ==
It is a historical colonial building was built in 19th century AD (1906) on the occasion of Queen Victoria's visit to Karnal. The name of Victoria Memorial Hall was changed to Gandhi Memorial Hall as the first condolence meeting was held there after Gandhiji's assassination in 1948.

== Architecture ==
Victoria Memorial Hall is a fine example of Indo-British Architecture. This Hall is a unique monument that features a fine combination of three architectural styles - Indian, Islamic and European. This monument is surrounded by a pillared Verandah. Verandah's arches are good example of Islamic architecture. There are four porticos on all the sides of building and outside of the pillared verandah. Though, it is a single story building but gives look of a double storeyed structure from the outside.

== Administration ==
As the up-keep was not good, the Punjab and Haryana High Court, in 2013, asked the state government to take up the restoration work of the building under the ASI as the building was slowly crumbling due to neglect. The Archaeological Survey of India built a compound wall and a gate for entry. The important artefacts in the old building were removed and sent to the museums.

Victoria Memorial Hall is to be a part of a Heritage corridor to be developed in Karnal Proposal are being made for the renovation of the heritage value of this structure.
