= A. M. (Arvind Manilal) Shah =

Indian sociologist (1931–2020)

Professor Arvind M. Shah (22 August 1931 – 7 September 2020) was an Indian historian and sociologist, known for his professorship in the Department of Sociology at the University of Delhi in 1996. He had been a student of M. N. Srinivas in 1952 and became a teacher in sociology at Maharaja Sayajirao University, Baroda, in 1958. Shah moved to the University of Delhi in 1961.

According to Hetukar Jha, Shah wrote the first paper on the sociological history of India. He was a recipient of the Lifetime Achievement award from the Indian Sociological Society (ISS) in 2009. He had held the office of ISS President in 1992-93 and had been secretary, sometimes jointly, from 1967 to 1972.

Shah died on 7 September 2020, at the age of 89.

== Publications ==
Among Shah's publications, his The Household Dimension of the Family in India (1973) is regarded as a landmark study and in 2014 was re-issued in a single volume titled The Writings of A. M. Shah: The Household and Family in India, which included some of his later writings on the subject - The Family in India: Critical Essays (1998) and Essays on the Family and the Elderly.

== Awards and honours ==
A festschrift in Shah's honour was published in 2010, entitled Understanding Indian Society: Past and Present (Essays for A M Shah).
