= Laxma Goud =

Indian artist

Kalal Laxma Goud
- Born: Kalal Laxma Goud; 21 August 1940 (age 86); Nizampur, Medak, Hyderabad State (now Telangana, India)
- Known for: Painting
- Awards: Padma Shri

Kalal Laxma Goud (born 21 August 1940) is an Indian painter, printmaker and draughtsman. He works in variety of mediums including etching, gouache, pastel, sculpture, and glass painting. He is best known for his early drawings that depict eroticism in a rural context, and also for the originality and quality of his etchings and aquatints.

== Early life and education ==
Laxma Goud was born in Nizampur, Medak district, Hyderabad State to Venka Goud and Anthamma. He was one of five sons and two daughters in his family. His childhood was spent in a village environment, where he grew up keenly aware, through firsthand observation, of rural tradition and craft. When he was a young boy he watched Andhra leather puppetry and the creation of terracotta ornamentation. As he grew older he studied drawing and painting at the Government College of Fine Arts and Architecture, Hyderabad. Goud went on to study Mural Painting under K.G. Subramanyan at the Faculty of Fine Arts, Maharaja Sayajirao University of Baroda from 1963 to 1965. It was at Baroda that Goud discovered his love of printmaking, and became a driving force at the university in building a strong and credible voice for the fine art print.

== Career ==
After graduation, Goud made the unlikely step of returning to his village of Nizampur. With the newly educated viewpoint of an urban sophisticate, the artist found himself attracted to the unselfconscious attitudes toward sexuality that contributed to the relaxed atmosphere of village life. This relaxed sexuality stood in stark contrast to the rigid sexual mores of the Indian middle-classes he had encountered in the cities.

== Style ==
Laxma Goud began to interpret his childhood memories of rural and tribal vivacity through an urban grid in which surreal, libidinal tones mingled with fantasy and poetry. He created masterful small paintings of village life in a palette of monochrome grays. He also drew in pen and ink, and his drawings and etchings from this period are an interesting combination of village nostalgia, the surreal, and the erotic. The artist is quoted as saying about this period of visual-erotic exploration, "We come from a culture which spoke openly about the man-woman relationship, about fertility. When it recurs in a contemporary context, why should anyone pull a face?"

Goats, full-uddered, became a signature motif. These goats are not just symbols of rural India. In Goud's words, "No one cares for a goat except perhaps for the artist who sees in the creature the dogged determination of a people who have learnt to live off their landscape by foraging for what they can get out of it."

By the 1970s Goud began to explore aquatint techniques in his etchings and also more intensely sexual themes. But by the 1980s the artist seemed to return to more traditional roots, exploring various craft forms such as terracotta and reverse glass painting in a more subdued and decorative style.

He is the head and teacher at Sarojini Naidu School of Performing Art, Fine Art & Communication, University of Hyderabad.

== Awards ==
The Government of India honoured him with Padma Shri in 2016.
