= Haku Shah =

Indian painter and author

- Born: Haku Vajubhai Shah; 26 March 1934; Valod, Gujarat, India
- Died: 21 March 2019 (aged 84); Ahmedabad, India
- Known for: Painting, tribal art, Ethnography, curation, Cultural anthropology
- Movement: Baroda Group
- Spouse: Vilu
- Children: Parthiv Shah, Setu Shah
- Awards: Padma Shri (1989)

Haku Vajubhai Shah (26 March 1934 – 21 March 2019) was an Indian painter, Gandhian, cultural anthropologist and author on folk and tribal art and culture. His art belonged to the Baroda Group and his works are considered in the line of artists who brought themes of folk or tribal art to Indian art.

He received several awards including the Padma Shri (1989), the Jawarharlal Nehru Fellowship and the Kala Ratna for his contribution to art.

== Early life and education ==
Haku Vajubhai Shah was born on 26 March 1934, in Valod (now in Surat district, Gujarat) to Vajubhai and Vadanben. His mother was influenced by Mahatma Gandhi and it influenced him. He completed his primary and secondary school education in Valod and was an active member of student union. He graduated in Fine Arts (BFA) from The Maharaja Sayajirao University of Baroda in 1955, followed by a master's degree in Fine Arts (MFA) from the same university. He worked at the National Institute of Design, Ahmedabad, primarily as an ethnographer. He and Eberhard Fischer (art historian) collaborated on several craft documentation and ethographic research studies. In 1970, Fischer and Shah published the book Rural Craftsmen and their Work at NID.

== Career ==
His work caught the public eye, and by 1965 he had held several one-man shows in Kolkata and Mumbai. In 1968, he curated the 'Unknown India' exhibition, organized by Art Critic Stella Kramrisch at the Philadelphia Museum of Art. He received the Rockefeller Grant in the same year and in 1971, the Nehru Fellowship Award.

Over the years, he carried out extensive field research and documentation on rural and tribal arts and crafts, traditions and folk lore. He taught at a Gandhian Ashram in south Gujarat for several years and established a tribal museum at Gujarat Vidyapith in Ahmedabad, which was set up by Mahatma Gandhi. Haku curated the museum for several years, which was to become his last legacy.

His work is deeply influenced by the tribal art and culture, a theme on which he wrote several of his works, and also Bhakti movement, especially its Nirguna poetry. He was also deeply influenced by Gandhian philosophy. In 1980s, he was also instrumental in the foundation of Shilpgram, a crafts village, in Udaipur, Rajasthan.

In 2009, he published his memoirs titled, Manush.

He died on 21 March 2019 in Ahmedabad following cardiac arrest at his home.

== Awards ==
- 1968: John D. Rockefeller 3rd Fellow, New York, U.S.A.
- 1971: Nehru Fellowship Award, New Delhi
- 1973: Civic Award, Ahmedabad Municipal Corporation
- 1975: John D. Rockefeller 3rd Fellow, New York, U.S.A.
- 1989: Padma Shri, President of India
- 1991: Regent Professor, California, U.S.A.
- 1997: Kala Ratna, All India Fine Arts and Crafts Society (AIFACS), New Delhi.
- 1998: Kala Shiromani, Lalit Kala Akademi, Ahmedabad
- 2006: Gagan Avani Puraskar, Shantiniketan

== Solo exhibitions ==
- 1961: Ashok Gallery, Kolkata
- 1962: Ashok Gallery, Kolkata
- 1963: Jehangir Art Gallery, Mumbai
- 1964: Jehangir Art Gallery, Mumbai; Academy of Arts, Kolkata
- 1967: Chemould Gallery, Mumbai; Private Garden, Delhi
- 1968: International House, Philadelphia, Pennsylvania; The Art Scene Today, Chemould Gallery, Mumbai; Asia Foundation Gallery, San Francisco, California
- 1969: Chemould Gallery, Mumbai; City Art Museum, St. Louis, Missouri
- 1971: Sanskar Kendra, Ahmedabad; Chemould Gallery, Mumbai
- 1973: Sanskar Kendra, Ahmedabad
- 1975: Chemould Gallery, Mumbai
- 1976: Gallery One, New York
- 1981: Sanskar Kendra, Paldi, Ahmedabad
- 1984: Academy of Fine Arts, Kolkata; Minge Kan, Folk Art Museum, Tokyo
- 1987: Vikram Art Gallery, Madras
- 1988: Aressa Gallery, Mumbai
- 1991: Bade Museum, Berkeley
- 1993: Art Heritage, New Delhi
- 1994: Chemould Gallery, Mumbai
- 1996: Cymroza Gallery, Mumbai
- 1997: The Village Gallery, New Delhi; India International Centre (IIC), New Delhi; The Gallery, Chennai, Art Indus, New Delhi; Herwitz Art Gallery, Ahmedabad
- 1998: Durban Art Gallery, Cape Town, South Africa; Lalit Kala Akademi, Chandigarh
- 1999: All India Fine Arts & Crafts Society, (AIFACS), New Delhi
- 2000: Birla Academy of Art & Culture, Mumbai
- 2002: Visual Art Gallery, India Habitat Centre, New Delhi
- 2004: Coomarswamy Hall, Prince of Wales Museum, Mumbai; Sarjan Art Gallery, Vadodara
- 2005: Shridharani Gallery, New Delhi; Cima Gallery, Kolkata; Marvel Art Gallery, Ahmedabad
- 2007: Time & Space Gallery, Bangalore; Visual Art Gallery, India Habitat Centre, New Delhi
- 2008: Tao Art Gallery, Mumbai; Emami Art, Kolkata; Marvel Art Gallery, Ahmedabad (Nov–Dec 2008)

== One-man photographic exhibitions ==
- 1982: Sanskar Kendra/National institute of design, Ahmedabad
- 1992: India International Centre (IIC), New Delhi
- 1994: Centre For Photography As An Art Form, NCPA, Bombay
- 2006: Alliance Francaise, Bangalore

== Films ==
- 1978: "Pithoro, the Tribal God"', Lalit Kala Akademi, New Delhi
- 1970, "Scraps", made with Yvonne Hannemann

== Major projects ==
- 1979: Process of Technology, concept and design, Tropenmuseum, Amsterdam, the Netherlands
- 1981: Village Vasna, concept/collection and photos, Museum of Mankind, London.
- 1983: Form and Many Forms of Mother Clay, concept, design, curator and catalogue, Crafts Museum, New Delhi and Mingei International, San Diego, California
- 1986: The Art of the Adivasis, commissioner, concept and design, in Japan, as part of "Festival of India"
- 1988: Form Colour and Creativity, curator, concept and design, Crafts Museum, New Delhi.
- 1989: Shilpa Gram, created permanent village as museum, craft centre, revival of arts and crafts and theatre, concept and design, Udaipur
- 1990: Shilpa Mela, Arts and Crafts Fair at Ahmedabad, visualizer, designer and consultant, for Handicrafts Corporation, Government of Gujarat.

== Children's books ==
- 1994: Champa, Hindi, Gujrati, Bengali Published by SAHMAT, New Delhi.
- 1998, Dharti, Hindi, Gujrati, Published by Indira Gandhi National Centre for the Arts (IGNCA), New Delhi
- 1998, Somi, Hindi, Gujrati, Published by Indira Gandhi National Centre for the Arts (IGNCA), New Delhi
- 2007, Jeevi aur Jeetu, Published by Vatsal Prakashan, Bikaner.
- 2007, Goth, Hindi, Published by Vatsal Prakashan, Bikaner.
- 2007, Manapari, English, Published by Shivshakthi, Bangalore.

== Publications ==
- 1969: Community Ancestor Worship, (in Gujarati, Hindi and English, Gujarat Vidyapith, Ahmedabad. (with Vimal Shah and Ramesh Shroff)
- 1970: Rural Craftsmen and their work, equipment and techniques in the Mer village of Ratadi in Saurashtra, India. National Institute of Design Ahmedabad (with Eberhard Fischer)
- 1971: Schlichter Eintrag-Ikat aus Süd-Gujarat, Indien, Die Herstellung von Lendentüchern für die Chaudhri-Stämme in Mandvi durch Khatri-Weber in Tribus Vol. 19:47–69, Linden-Museum, Stuttgart. (with Eberhard Fischer)
- 1971: Mogra dev, tribal crocodile gods of the Chodhri, Gamit and Vasava tribes, South Gujarat, India. Gujarat Vidyapith, Ahmedabad (with Eberhard Fischer)
- 1972: Kunsttraditionen in Nordindien: Stammeskunst, Volkskunst, klassische Kunst. Museum Rietberg Zürich (with Eberhard Fischer)
- 1973: Simple weft-ikat from South Gujarat, India. Calico Museum of Textiles, Ahmedebad (with Eberhard Fischer)
- 1973: Vetra ne khambha, memorials for the dead, wooden figures and memorial slabs of the Chodhri, Gamit and Vasava tribes, South Gujarat, India. Gujarat Vidyapith, Ahmedabad (with Eberhard Fischer)
- 1974: Tatauieren in Kutch, in Ethnologische Zeitschrift Zürich Vol.2:105–129 Völkerkundemuseum Zürich. (with Eberhard Fischer)
- 1975: Kites flourishing in Ahmedabad, India, in Asian Culture Centre for UNESCO.
- 1976, Treatment against Ghosts and Spirits, the Bhagtai-ceremony of the Chodhri tribe in Gujarat, in German Scholars on India, vol.2:51–60, Bombay (with Eberhard Fischer)
- 1978: Folk Myth and Tribal Magic, in Art Heritage exhibition catalogue no.1.
- 1979: More lights on the Harappan Terracotta Figures, in The Eastern Anthropologist with Suman Pandya)
- 1980: The ritual paintings of the god Pithora Baba, Zürcher Zeitschrift für Ethnologie, vol. 11: 7–62.
- 1982: Tempeltücher für die Muttergöttinnen in Indien, Zeremonien, Herstellung und Ikonographie gemalter und gedruckter Stoffbilder aus Gujarat, Museum Rietberg Zürich (with Eberhard Fischer and Jyotindra Jain)
- 1982: The voice that paints, in Shilpakar, pp. 77–87, Crafts Council of Western India, Bombay.
- 1984: On Art and Ritual, India International Centre Quarterly, vol. 11, no.4:14–33, New Delhi. (Interview with Geeti Sen)
- 1985: Form and many Forms of Mother Clay, Contemporary Indian Pottery and Terracotta (with contributions by Pupul Jayakar, C. Sivaramamurti and Stella Kramrisch) exhibition catalogue for the National Crafts Museum, New Delhi.
- 1985: Votive terracottas of Gujarat, Mapin Publishers, Ahmedabad. (edited by Carmen Kegal)
- 1985: Gopal, ein indischer Balladensänger zeichnet sein Leben, Jogi Gopal gay chhe, Gopal chitre chhe (German and Gujarati) Peter Hammer Verlag, Wuppertal. (with Barbara and Eberhard Fischer) Gopal singt, Lieder eines indischen Balladensängers und Zeichners, tape and leaflet of songs by Gopal.
- 1987, Some 19th-century garâs pata or jajmâniî documents of Muslim potters in Kutch, in Verhandlungen der Naturforschenden Gesellschaft, Basel, vol. 97:103–120, Museum für Völkerkunde Basel. (with Eberhard Fischer)
- 1991, Mati in Indigenous Visions, India International Centre Quarterly, New Delhi (interview with Geeti Sen)
- 1992, Teju means radiating light, in Brunner and Vogelsanger edit. Teju zeichnet, aus den Malheften einer indischen Familie (pp. 5–12), Völkerkundemuseum der Universität Zürich.
- 1992: Contemporary streams of tribal and folk art, exhibition catalogue New South Wales Gallery, Australia.
- 2009: Manush (memoirs).

== See also ==
- Indian pottery
