= Baroda Group =

Artist collective at Baroda University

The Baroda Group refers to the artists involved with the Maharaja Sayajirao University of Baroda Faculty of Fine Arts, in the Indian state of Gujarat. An experimental art school that drew artists of a variety of backgrounds, the Baroda Group offered an alternative to the nationalism associated with Santiniketan and the Bengal School.

The dynamic group was formed in 1957 under the guidance of N. S. Bendre. Prominent artists associated with the group were N. S. Bendre, Bhupen Khakhar, Gulam Mohammed Sheikh, Ratan Parimoo, Rekha Rodwittiya, Jyotsna Bhatt, Vivan Sundaram, K. G. Subramanyan, Jayant Parikh and Jeram Patel.

== History ==
The Faculty of Fine Arts, established in 1949, at Maharaja Sayajirao University of Baroda was intended to provide an alternative to established art schools while promoting the value of contemporary art. The school's curriculum centered around the concept of "Living Traditions," or the idea that traditions are necessary to modern and contemporary art, and arts must learn from them. This concept led to exhibitions of folk art and the Fine Arts Fair, developed by teacher and artist K. G. Subramanyan. At Fine Arts Fairs, local craftspeople would teach students their trade, inviting students to learn from these traditions and experiment with different media and forms. This proved especially fruitful for Mrinalini Mukherjee, a contemporary artist who would eventually become acclaimed for her hemp-based sculptures.

These fairs also inspired Subramanyan's work in terra cotta. Between 1962 and 1963, Subramanyan and a team of students and faculty collaborated on a terracotta tile mural on the front wall of the Rabindralaya auditorium in Lucknow, illustrating the Rabindranath Tagore story The King of the Dark Chamber.This kind of collaboration between teacher and student was an important aspect of teaching at Baroda, while the medium and content reflected Subramanyan's emphasis on folk craft and indigenous culture. Subramanyan celebrated craftspeople and folk art because he believed in craftsmanship as an alternative to the negative effects of consumerism. He said,

All consumer goods within such a country can be hand-made, if not home-made, and I presume enterprising economists and social-planners can expound on the need and viability of these. I have reason to believe that some of the traditional production systems are some of the most efficient and sensitive structures to date...By which I mean not just the present availability of technology and tools, materials and capital, or the market demands, but also the development of the human individual, human interaction, human refinement within an integrated life system.

In addition to drawing inspiration from tribal traditions and crafts, Baroda artists also believed in documenting and preserving these traditions. Concerned that folk arts were dying out, artist Jyoti Bhatt photographed the lives and art of different tribes around India, including the people of Kutch and Saurashtra regions as well as Rabari people. Through his travels, Bhatt photographed and documented the artistic traditions of women from all over India, including Uttar Pradesh, Madhya Pradesh, Punjab, Gujarat, and Bihar.

In 1981, artists Jogen Chowdhury, Bhupen Khakhar, Nalini Malani, Sudhir Patwardhan, Gulam Mohammed Sheikh, and Vivan Sundaram participated in A Place for People, an exhibition focused on contemporary narrative and figurative art. This exhibition marked the beginning of the Narrative Figurative Movement of Indian art, which announced the return of the narrative Indian art, a turn away from the abstraction that had dominated much of the twentieth century. In an accompanying essay, Geeta Kapur laid out an argument for the value of the narrative in contemporary Indian art, arguing that the centrality of the narrative (and the figural) in historical Indian art, like temple architecture and miniature painting, made the narrative a vital resource for contemporary Indian artists. She saw modernism's simplification of forms as parallel to Indian traditions in sculpture and miniaturism, and thus an important consideration for contemporary artists. Fundamentally, she believed in the power of the narrative and the figurative as the basis for a life-affirming art that moves away from nihilism and towards a more positive future for both Indian art and India itself, one that acknowledges the complexity and contradictions of contemporary urban life. Kapur's assertions were supplemented by the artist's statements in the catalog. Gulam Mohammed Sheikh wrote,

Living in India means living simultaneously in several times and cultures. One often walks into 'medieval' situations and runs into 'primitive' people. The past exists as a living entity alongside the present, each illuminating and sustaining the other. As times and cultures converge, the citadels of purism explode. Traditional and modern, private and public, the inside and the outside are being continually splintered and reunited. The kaleidoscopic flux engages the eye and mobilises the monad into action. Like the many eyed and armed archetype of an Indian child soiled with multiple visions I draw my energy from the source.

While the Narrative Figurative Movement became an important turn for Indian modern artists, it also proved to be somewhat controversial. The Indian Radical Painters' and Sculptors' Association pushed back against Kapur's idealistic interpretation of narrative art, launching their own counter-exhibition titled Questions and Dialogue. Despite this controversy, the Narrative Figurative Movement continues to be an important era of Indian art, as it launched the careers of artists like Sudhir Patwardhan, Bhupen Khakhar, and Nalini Malani.

== Exhibitions ==
The Baroda Group had exhibited in various cities like Bombay, Ahmedabad, and Srinagar between the mid-1950s and mid-1960s. Members of the group changed over the years. The exhibition intended to show works of both established and emerging artists at the time. Participating artists included Jyoti Bhatt, N. S. Bendre, Farokh Contractor, Bhupendra Desai, Kishori Kaul, Padmini Manerikar, Sumant Shah, Vinod Shah, G. R. Santosh, K. G. Subramanyan, G. M. Sheikh, Himmat Shah, Narendra Amin, Shailesh Dave, Triloke Kaul, Vinodray Patel, Jayant Parikh, Jeram Patel, Jyoti Shah, Vinay Trivedi, Balkrishna Patel, and Hasmukh Modi.

- The first exhibition was held at Udayan, Sayaji Baug, Baroda, from 21 to 26 April 1956.
- The second exhibition was held at Jehangir Art Gallery, Bombay, from 23 to 31 March 1957.
- The third exhibition was held at the Alliance Francaise Gallery located in Dhanraj Mahal in Bombay, from 22 to 28 October 1958. In the exhibition, 22 oil paintings by the Baroda Group of Artists were exhibited.
- The fourth exhibition was held at Jehangir Art Gallery, Bombay, from 3 to 10 December 1959.
- Fifth annual exhibition was held at Roopa Gallery, Taj Mahal Hotel, Bombay, from 25 to 31 January 1961.

== See also ==
- Group 1890
- Calcutta Group
- Bombay Progressive Artists' Group
