= Nilima Sheikh =

Indian artist (born 1945)

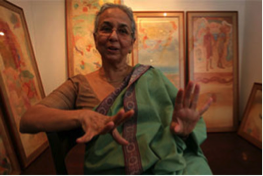
- Born: 18 November 1945 (age 80); Delhi, British India
- Education: Delhi University; Maharaja Sayajirao University of Baroda
- Known for: Painting
- Spouse: Gulam Mohammed Sheikh

Nilima Sheikh (born 18 November 1945) is a visual artist based in Baroda, India.

Since the mid-1980s, Sheikh has done extensive research about traditional art forms in India, advocated for the sustainability of the practice of traditional painters, and used a wide range of visual and literary sources in her work. Her work focuses on displacement, longing, historical lineage, tradition, communal violence, and the ideas of femininity. She started exhibiting her work in 1969 and has participated in numerous group exhibitions, most recently documenta 14, Athens and Kassel in 2017. Her first museum exhibition was organized by The Art Institute of Chicago in 2014.

== Early life and education ==
Nilima was born on 18 November 1945 in New Delhi. studied history at the Delhi University between 1962 and 1965, and received her Master of Fine Arts from the Faculty of Fine Arts, Maharaja Sayajirao University of Baroda in 1971. She was influenced by artists such as Kanwal Krishna, Devyani Krishna, and K. G. Subramanyan, and attributes the older Santiniketan experiment, Baroda's weightage to art history, and her earlier education in history as major influences.

Sheikh who originally trained in Western-style oil painting and later transitioned to a self-taught miniature painter due to her interests in historical traditions of painting in Asia. She has also stated to be influenced by pre-modern Rajput and Mughal court paintings, especially traditional tempera paintings like Pichhwai and Thangka paintings.

== Career ==
From 1987-89, Nilima organised and participated in the exhibition titled 'Through The Looking Glass' with her contemporaries, the women artists Nalini Malani, Madhvi Parekh, and Arpita Singh. The exhibition, featuring works by all four artists, travelled to five non-commercial venues across India. Inspired by a meeting in 1979 with Nancy Spero, May Stevens and Ana Mendieta at the AIR Gallery in New York (the first all-female artists’ cooperative gallery in the US), Nalini Malani had planned to organise an exhibition entirely of works by women artists, which failed to materialise due to a lack of interest and support.

== Exhibitions ==
Solo exhibitions include Terrain: Carrying Across, Leaving Behind, Gallery Chemould, Mumbai (2017); "Each night put Kashmir in your dreams," Chemould Prescott Road, Mumbai (2010), Lalit Kala Akademi, New Delhi (2010), and The Art Institute of Chicago (2014); Drawing Trails, Gallery Espace, Delhi, India (2009).

Group exhibitions include documenta 14, Athens and Kassel (2017); Revisiting Beauty, Gallery Threshold, New Delhi (2016); 48th Annual Exhibition 2015, Birla Academy of Art and Culture, Calcutta (2015); Aesthetic Bind | Floating World, Chemould Prescott Rd, Colaba (2014); Touched by Bhupen, Galerie Mirchandani + Steinruecke, Colaba (2013); and Tracing Time - Works On Paper, Bodhi Art, Mumbai (2009).

In 2018, Asia Art Archive from Hong Kong organized an exhibition called Lines of Flight: Nilima Sheikh Archive drawing from their collection of Nilima Sheikh. The exhibition presents travelling as a research method and artistic techniques for her to reinterpret material cultures and histories across national borders.

In 2017, Sheikh's work was exhibited in documenta 14 in Athens, Greece, and in Kassel, Germany.

For the 2020 Dhaka Art Summit, Sheikh created one of her largest murals titled, 'Beyond Loss'.

In 2026-2027, the Museum of Modern Art displayed Nilima Sheikh: Fractured Skies "brings together selections from her series Each Night Put Kashmir in Your Dreams (2003–14) and Home, Land (2023–25) alongside Shahid/Witness (2025–26), a new, site-responsive set of paintings commissioned by the Kiran Nadar Museum of Art, New Delhi."

== Art forms ==
Nilima creates artwork in a diverse range of forms. Those include stencils, drawing, painting, installation, large scrolls, theatre set designs and children books illustration. The books that she has been involved in production are: Do Mutthi Chawal (1986), Moon in the Pot (2008), Blue and Other Stories (2012) and Saare Mausam Achchhe (2016).

== Research ==
Nilima finds inspirations from various cultures through travelling.

In the mid-1980s, she received a fellowship to document the traditional art forms, especially Picchwai paintings of Nathdwara. She made drawings of the motifs of these art forms, documented the tools and methods they use, and also corresponded with organizations related to cultural heritage to ask for support for the preservation of these art forms.

In 1990, she was invited to visit Beijing, China by the Indian Council for Cultural Relations to look at the reproductions of Dunhuang murals. She visited again, together with Gulam in 2011, for a site visit at the caves in Dunhuang. Nilima believes the visual aesthetics of Dunhuang cave has influenced her own creative practice as she often infused shifting perspectives and scales into her own works.
