= Jyoti Bhatt =

Indian artist (born 1934)

- Born: Jyotindra Manshankar Bhatt; 12 March 1934 (age 92); Bhavnagar, Gujarat, British Raj
- Movement: Baroda Group
- Spouse: Jyotsna Bhatt
- Awards: Padma Shri (2019); Fellow of the Lalit Kala Akademi (2022)

Jyotindra Manshankar Bhatt (12 March 1934), better known as Jyoti Bhatt, is an Indian artist best known for his modernist work in painting and printmaking and also his photographic documentation of rural Indian culture. He studied painting under N. S. Bendre and K.G. Subramanyan at the Faculty of Fine Arts, Maharaja Sayajirao University (M.S.U.), Baroda. Later he studied fresco and mural painting at Banasthali Vidyapith in Rajasthan, and in the early 1960s went on to study at the Academia di Belle Arti in Naples, Italy, as well the Pratt Institute in New York. He was awarded the Padma Shri in 2019 and elected as a Fellow of the Lalit Kala Akademi in 2022.

== Biography ==
Bhatt moved from a cubist influence in his early work to a lighthearted and colorful Pop art that often drew its imagery from traditional Indian folk designs. Though Bhatt worked in a variety of mediums, including watercolors and oils, it is his printmaking that ultimately garnered him the most attention. In 1966 Bhatt returned to M.S.U. Baroda with a thorough knowledge of the intaglio process that he had gained at the Pratt Institute at Brooklyn in New York. It was partially Bhatt's enthusiasm for intaglio that caused other artists such as Jeram Patel, Bhupen Khakhar and Gulam Mohammed Sheikh, to take up the same process. Bhatt, and his compatriots at the Faculty of Fine Arts in Baroda, soon came to be known as "The Baroda School" of Indian art.

Late in the 1960s, Bhatt was asked to take photographs of Gujarati folk art. Initially, this work was done for a seminar, but it soon became one of the artist's passions to document traditional Indian craft and design work. The disappearing arts of rural Gujarat became a focus. Though Bhatt's investigations into a village and tribal designs certainly influenced the motifs he used in his printmaking, Bhatt considers his documentary photographs to be an art form in themselves. His direct and simply composed photographs have become valued on their own merit.

Throughout Bhatt's career as a teacher at the M.S.U. Faculty of Fine Arts, he photographed the university, its faculty and students, and the buildings of the Baroda campus. According to the cited source, this body of work documents the development of the "Baroda School" of Indian art.

It is Jyoti Bhatt's prints, however, that are most associated with the artist. His etchings, intaglios, and screen prints have explored and re-explored a personal language of symbols that stem from Indian culture: the peacock, the parrot, the lotus, stylized Indian gods and goddesses, and unending variations on tribal and village designs. Recently he has explored digital printing and holography.

His work is in numerous international collections, including the Museum of Modern Art, New York, The Smithsonian Institution, Washington D.C., The British Museum, London. and the Museum of Art & Photography, Bangalore.

== Personal life ==
Jyoti Bhatt met Jyotsna Bhatt, a potter, during her college years and they married later. They lived in Vadodara. They had a daughter, Jaii. Jyotsna Bhatt was a ceramic artist and a professor of ceramics and she died in 2020.

== Recognition ==
- A top prize, World Photo Contest, at Fotokina, Germany. (1978)
- Grand Prix, 13th Annual Photo contest for Asia and Pacific, UNESCO, Japan. (1989)
- President's Gold Plaque and National Award, 1956.
- First Prize for the postal stamps design for the 25th Anniversary of Independence of India.
- Bronze Medal, at Nikon world Photo Contest. Japan.
- Padma Shri (2019)
- Dhirubhai Thakar Savyasachi Saraswat Award (2020)
- Fellowship of Lalit Kala Akademi (2022)
