= Shanti Dave =

Indian artist (born 1931)

- Born: 25 September 1931 (age 94); Badpura, Gujarat, India
- Occupation: Painter
- Known for: Murals and paintings
- Movement: Baroda Group
- Awards: Padma Shri

Shanti Dave (born 25 September 1931) is an Indian painter and sculptor, considered by many as one of the major Indian artists of the twentieth century. He is a former member of the Lalit Kala Akademi and the Sahitya Kala Parishad. The Government of India awarded him the fourth highest Indian civilian honour of Padma Shri in 1985.

== Biography ==
Dave was born on 25 September 1931 at the northern Gujarat village of Badpura as one of the four children of a rural family of modest means. He did his education from The Maharaja Sayajirao University of Baroda in 1951 from where he completed his graduate and post graduate studies in Faculty of Fine Arts. He started his career as a commercial artist doing banners and sign boards but slowly made his mark as a painter, which earned him several notable assignments such as at the VIP Lounges of JFK Airport (New York) and at the Air India booking offices in New York, Los Angeles, Rome, Sydney, and Perth. The mural at the airport was published by The New York Times on its front page on 5 February 1964 under the title, Little Gujarat.

Dave's works are abstract and use encaustic and wax with oil paint techniques together with calligraphy. He has done several murals of large proportions which incorporate wood block painting, stone carving and weaving. He did his first solo exhibition in 1957 followed by several others in many parts of the world and has participated in many group exhibitions at places such as Philippines, Switzerland, London, Japan, France, East Europe and the Middle East. His creations are on display at art galleries like the National Gallery of Modern Art, New Delhi and many public places and his paintings have been sold at notable auction houses such as Christie's and Sotheby's and Bonhams.

Dave is a former member of the Sahitya Kala Parishad and has served as a member of the executive board of the Lalit Kala Akademi.

== Awards and recognition ==
Dave has won the Lalit Kala Akademi three years consecutively from 1956 to 1958. The Government of India awarded him the civilian honour of Padma Shri in 1985.

== See also ==
- Encaustic painting
