= Ratan Parimoo =

Kashmiri art historian

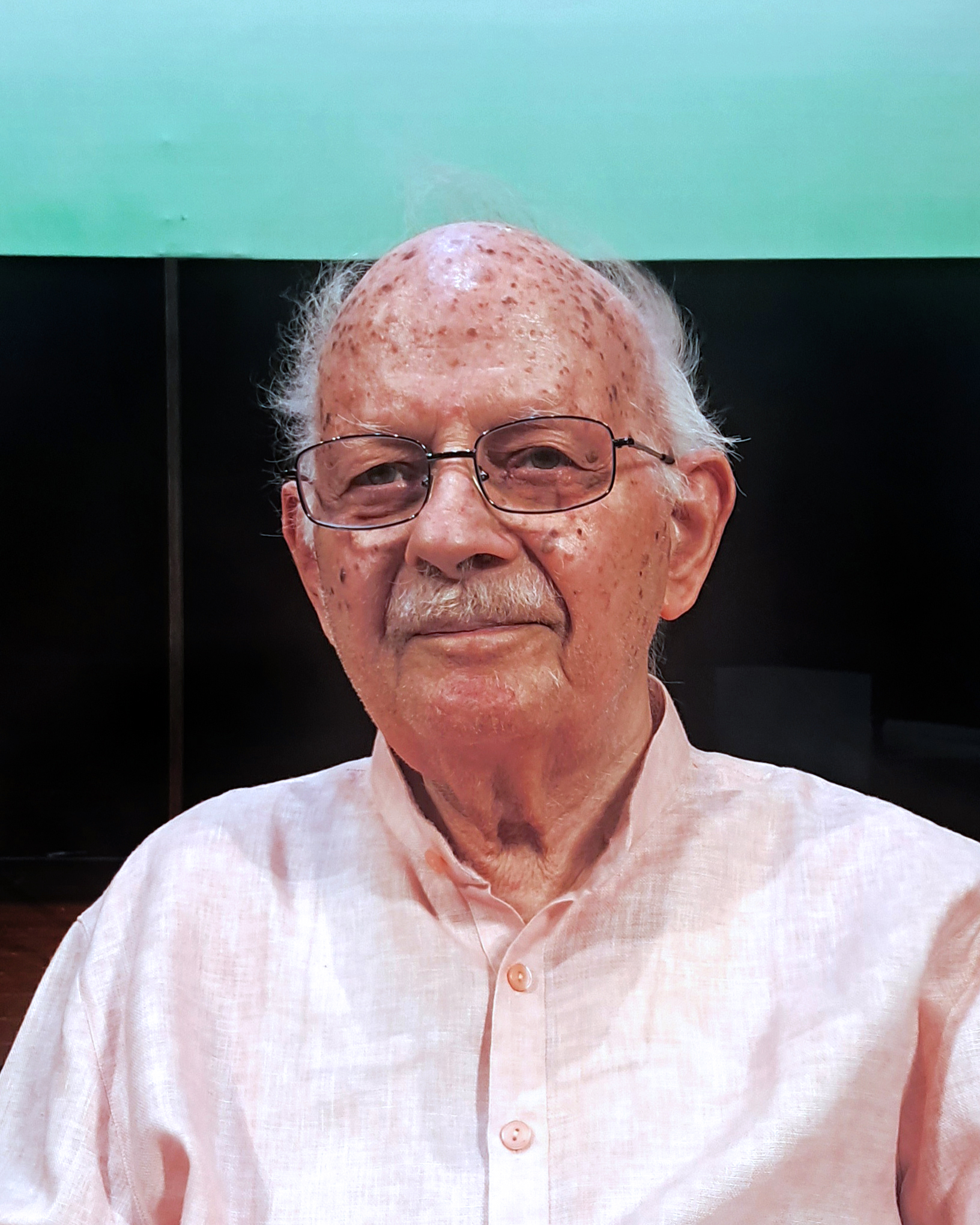
Padma Shri awardee Professor Ratan Parimoo during a public appearance in Baroda, July 2025

Ratan Parimoo is an Indian art historian from Kashmir, who has worked as an art educator, pedagogue, artist and former director of the Lalbhai Dalpatbhai Museum, Ahmedabad. Ratan Parimoo was one of the founder members of Baroda Group. In January 2025, he was honored with the Padma Shri, India's fourth-highest civilian award, by the Government of India.

He publishes on the arts of Ajanta, Ellora, Jain, Rajasthani, Pahari and Mughal paintings and drawings. He authored Art of Three Tagores- From Revival to Modernity. He is married to artist Naina Dalal.

== Books ==
=== Books Authored ===
- Paintings of the three Tagores, Abanindranath, Gaganendranath, Rabindranath – Chronology and Comparative Study (PhD Thesis), MS University of Baroda, Vadodara,1973.
- Studies in Modern Indian Art, Kanak Publications-Books India, New Delhi, 1975.
- Life of Buddha in Indian Sculpture, Kanak Publications, New Delhi, 1982. Enlarged edition, DK Printworld, Delhi, 2009.
- Sculptures of Sheshashayi Vishnu, MS University of Baroda, Vadodara, 1983.
- The Pictorial World of Gaganendranath Tagore, National Gallery of Modern Art, New Delhi, 1995.
- Studies in Indian Sculptures, Essays in New Art History, Books & Books, New Delhi, 2000.
- Studies on the Art of Raja Ravi Varma, Thrissur (Kerala), 2006.
- NC Mehta Collection Vol I, Gujarati School and Jaina Manuscript Paintings, Ahmedabad, 2010.
- The Art of Three Tagores, From Revival to Modernity, Kumar Gallery, New Delhi, 2011.
- NC Mehta Collection Vol II, Rajasthani, Central Indian, Pahari and Mughal Paintings, Ahmedabad, 2013
- Treasures from the Lalbhai Dalpatbhai Museum], Ahmedabad, 2013.
- Gaganendranath Tagore, A Retrospective, an Exhibition Catalogue, Victoria Memorial Hall in collaboration with Rabindra Bharati Society, Kolkata, 2014.
- From the Earthly World to the Realm of Gods, Kasturbhai Lalbhai Collection of Indian Drawings. Ahmedabad, 2019.

=== Books Edited ===
- Proceedings of Workshop in History of Art, 1977, published on behalf of University Grant Commission, New Delhi, by MS University of Baroda, Vadodara, 1979.
- Vaiṣhnavism in Indian Art and Culture, Books & Books, New Delhi, 1987.
- Ellora Caves – Sculptures and Architecture, Books & Books, New Delhi, 1988.
- The Paintings of Rabindranath Tagore, Lalit Kala Akademi, New Delhi, 1989. Revised edition, Lalit Kala Akademi, New Delhi, 2008.
- The Arts of Ajanta – New Perspectives, Books & Books, New Delhi, 1991.
- Creative Arts in Modern India, Books & Books, New Delhi, 1995.
- The Legacy of Raja Ravi Varma – The Painter, Maharaja Fatehsingh Museum Trust, Baroda, 1998.
- (with Sandip Sarkar) Historical Development of Contemporary Indian Art 1800 – 1947, Lalit Kala Akademi, New Delhi, 2009.
- Ellora Caves – Sculptures and Architecture, Books & Books, New Delhi, 1988. Revised edition, Apparent Books, Pune, 2018.
- Shridhar Andhare, (ed) Ratan Parimoo, Calligraphy and Art of Writing in Jain Manuscripts, Ahmedabad, 2020.

=== Felicitations Published in His Honour ===
- Towards a New Art History: Studies in Indian Art, Essays in Honour of Prof Ratan Parimoo, (ed) Shivaji Panikkar, Parul Dave Mukherji, et al., DK Printworld, New Delhi, 2003.
- RATNA DiPAh, New Dimensions of Indian Art History & Theory, Essays in Honour of Prof Ratan Parimoo, (ed) Gauri Parimoo Krishnan, RH Kulkarni, Agam Kala Prakashan, 2021.

== Art exhibitions ==
- 1955 onwards — National Exhibitions of Lalit Kala Akademi, New Delhi.
- 1956,57,58,59 — Baroda Group of Artists Exhibitions in Bombay.
- 1958 — First one-man show, Srinagar.
- 1962 — South Asian Artists, Durham, U.K.
- 1964,65,75 — Joint shows with wife Naina Dalal, at Bombay, Delhi and I.P.C.L., Baroda.
- 1972 — Retrospective Exhibition at Delhi, Rabindra Bhawan.
- 1975,1976 — Alumni Exhibition, Faculty of Fine Arts, Silver Jubilee, Bombay, Baroda.
- 1973,75 — One-man shows at Bombay.
- 1976 — One-man show in Delhi.
- 1979 — One-man show in Ahmedabad.
- 1990 — Organized and exhibited with EIGHT BARODA ARTISTS, CMC Ltd., New Delhi.
- 1991-1992 — Artists Against Communalism, Delhi.
- 1992 — Birla Akademi of Art, Calcutta, Silver Jubilee Exhibition, West Zone.
- 1995 — Bharat Bhavan Biennale, Bhopal.
- 1995 — Tribute to Husain on 80th Birthday, Aurodhan Gallery, Hyatt Regency Hotel, Delhi.
- 1996 — Contemporary Indian Painting, Bombay Art Society, Bombay.
- 1997 — Major Trends in Indian Art, Lalit Kala Akademi, New Delhi.
- 1999 — Retrospective Exhibitions, Jehangir Art Gallery, Cymroza Art Gallery, Bombay.
- 2000 — Retrospective Exhibitions, Natarani Theatre, Ahmedabad & Welcome Hotel, Baroda.
- 2002 — Allahabad Museum, Allahabad. — Exhibitions-Auctions of OSIAN'S, Mumbai, curated by Shri Neville Tuli
- 2001, February — India: The Passionate Detachment
- 2002, July — India in Making, 1757–1950
- 2002, November — Masterpieces and Museum Quality Indian Modern and Contemporary Paintings.
- 2005, February — Masterpieces and Museum Quality Indian Modern and Contemporary Paintings.
- 2004 — Art for Vision (For Shankara Netralaya) LKA, New Delhi.
- 2006 — Parimini Shakla, Fifty years of Ratan Parimoo's Paintings (1956–2006), Baroda, Delhi.
- 2008 — Parimoo's Chaurapanchashika: Iconography of A Nayika, Jehangir Art Gallery, Mumbai.
- 2009 — Parimoo's Chaurapanchashika: Iconography of A Nayika, Habitat Centre, New Delhi.
- 2010–11 — Ratan Parimoo's Early Phase, (1956–1960), Sponsored by Marvel Gallery, Ahmedabad, Baroda, Mumbai.
- 2018 — CONCOURSE, 9th Annual Contemporary Art Show Exhibition of Kashmiri Muslim and Pandit Artists Srinagar (Kashmir).

== Artists' camp ==
Participated in artists' camps:

- 1969 — Pavagarh
- 1976 — Srinagar, Kashmir
- 2005 — Regional Centre, Lalit Kala Akademi, Lucknow

== Awards ==
- 1957 Cultural Scholarship for Painting, Govt. of India
- 1960-1963 Commonwealth Scholarship to study in London
- 1966 First prize in Painting, Annual Exhibition, J & K, Cultural Akademi.
- 1974 Rockefeller IIIrd Grant to study & travel in USA.
- 1991-1993 Jawaharlal Nehru Fellowship for Jataka Stories in Buddhist Art.
- 2000 Gaurav Puraskar, Gujarat State Lalit Kala Akademi.
- 2016 Raja Ravi Varma Chitrakar Sanman award, Megh Mandal Sansthan Mumbai.
- 2019 'Rabindranath Tagore Birth Centenary Medal' by Asiatic Society in Kolkata at 235th annual meet for contribution to human culture (2018).

== Collections ==
- Hermitage, Lenningrad
- National Gallery of Modern Art, New Delhi
- Punjab University, Chandigarh
- Air India, Bombay
- Shyamal Builders, Baroda
- Gujarat State Lalit Kala Akademi, Delhi Sahitya Kala Parishad, Madhavan Nair Foundation, Cochin, Cymroza Art Gallery, Mumbai
- Welcome Hotel, Vadodara. & Private Collections

== Major Lecture Series ==
- 1980 – Radhakamal Mukherji Memorial Lecture, U.P. State Lalit Kala Akademi, Lucknow.
- 1983 – UGC National Lectures at Chandigarh, Santiniketan & Madurai.
- 1989 – Hindi Sahitya Parishad, Ahmedabad.
- 1990 – Somashekhar Memorial Lecture, Dept. of Archaeology, Govt. of Andhra Pradesh, Hyderabad.
- 1999 – Abanindranath Memorial Lecture, Calcutta.
- 2005 – Raja Ravi Varma Death Centenary Lecture, Cochin.

== Foreign Travels ==
- 1960-61 – Commonwealth Fellowship to study in London University.
- 1967 – One month's traveling in USSR under Indo-Soviet Cultural Programme.
- 1974 – JDR Rockefeller IIIrd Fund, New York, USA.
- 1978 – Invited to participate in the world Congress of International Society for Education Through Art, Adelaide, Australia.
- 1993 – Travelled to London, Paris, Berlin.

== Membership(s) of Societies/ Associates being held ==
- 1981-1984 – Member, Executive Board, Lalit Kala Akademi, Delhi.
- 1982 – Member, UGC Panel Art History / Museology.
- 1982-1988 – Executive Secretary, Indian Association of Art Historians.
- 1985 – Member, UGC Pay Scale Revision committee.
- 1987 – Member, Central Advisory Board of Museums, Govt. of India.
- 1993-1995 – Member, History of Science Panel, Indian National Science Akademi, New Delhi.
- 1994-1997 – Member, UGC Panel for Art History / Fine Arts.
- 1998-2000 – Art Purchase Committee, NGMA, Delhi.
- 2003-2005 – Programme Advisory Committee, NGMA, Mumbai.
- 2003- 2005 – Board of Studies, Jawahar Nehru University, New Delhi. Board of Studies, National Council of Educational Research and Teaching, New Delhi.
- 2011 – Authentication Committee appointed by Archaeological Survey of India, New Delhi, to access the exhibition of 20 fake paintings of Rabindranath Tagore held at College of Arts and Crafts, Kolkata.
- 2012-2014 – Member, Board of Studies, School of Art and Aesthetics, JNU.
- 2014-2016 – Member, Acquisition Committee, NGMA, New Delhi.
- 2015-2020 – Chief Advisor, Textbooks in Fine Arts for class XI and Class XII, National Council of Educational Research and Training.
