= Bhupen Khakhar =

Indian artist (1934–2003)

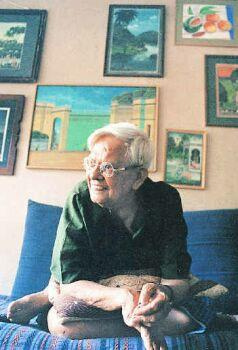
- Born: Bhupen Khakhar; 10 March 1934; Bombay, India
- Died: 8 August 2003 (aged 69); Baroda, India

Bhupen Khakhar (also spelled Bhupen Khakkar, 10 March 1934 – 8 August 2003) was an Indian artist. He was a member of the Baroda Group and gained international recognition for his work as "India's first 'Pop' artist."

== Works ==
Khakhar was a self-trained artist, and started his career as a painter relatively late in his life. His works were figurative in nature, concerned with the human body and its identity. An openly gay artist, the problem of gender definitions and gender identity were major themes of his work. His paintings often contained references to Indian mythology and mythological themes.

== Early life ==
Bhupen Khakhar was born in Bombay and had three siblings.

The Khakhars were originally artisans who came from the Portuguese colony of Diu. Bhupen was the first of his family to attend the University of Bombay, where he studied B.A. At his family's insistence he went on to take a Bachelor of Commerce from Sydenham College of Commerce and Economics and qualified as a Chartered Accountant. Khakhar worked as an accountant for many years partnering with Bharat Parikh & Associates in Baroda Gujarat India., pursuing his artistic inclinations in his free time. He became well versed in Hindu mythology and literature, and well informed about the visual arts.

In 1958, Khakhar met Gujarati poet and painter Ghulam Mohammed Sheikh, who encouraged Khakar to visit the newly founded Faculty of Fine Arts in Baroda.

== Career ==
Khakhar's oil paintings were often narrative and autobiographical. His first exhibited works presented deities cut from popular prints, glued onto mirrors, supplemented by graffiti and gestural marks. He began to mount solo exhibitions as early as 1965. Though the artist had been largely self-taught, his work soon garnered attention and critical praise. By the 1980s, Khakhar was enjoying solo shows in places as far away as London, Berlin, Amsterdam and Tokyo.

The artist's work celebrated the day to day struggles of India's common man. Khakhar's early paintings depicted average people, such as the barber, the watch repairman, and even an assistant accountant with whom he worked. The painter took special care to reproduce the environments of small Indian shops in these paintings, and revealed a talent for seeing the intriguing within the mundane. His work has been compared to that of David Hockney. He was a long standing personal friend of Howard Hodgkin who regularly came to stay with him after meeting in 1975. Though he was influenced by the British Pop movement, Khakhar understood that western versions of Pop Art would not have the same resonance in India.

Two Men in Benares (1982) at the Art Institute of Chicago, in 2023

Khakhar's often openly homosexual themes attracted special notice. Homosexuality was something that at the time was rarely addressed in India. The artist explored his own homosexuality in extremely personal ways, touching upon both its cultural implications and its amorous and erotic manifestations. Khakhar painted homosexual love, life, and encounters from a distinctively Indian perspective.

In the 1990s, Khakhar began experimenting more with water colours and grew increasingly confident in both expression and technique. He found himself portrayed as "the accountant" in Salman Rushdie's novel The Moor's Last Sigh. Khakhar returned the favour by later making a portrait of the author that he called The Moor, and which is now housed within the National Portrait Gallery, London. In You Can't Please All (1981; London, Knoedler's) a life-size naked figure, a self-portrait, watches from a balcony, as father, son and donkey enact an ancient fable, winding through the townscape in continuous narration.

== Awards and honours ==
In 2000, Khakhar was honoured with the Prince Claus Award at the Royal Palace of Amsterdam. Among other honours, he won the Asian Council's Starr Foundation Fellowship, 1986, and the prestigious Padma Shri (Indian Government's award for excellence) in 1984. His works can be found in the collections of the British Museum, The Tate Gallery, London, The Museum of Modern Art, New York, among others.

== Books on Khakhar ==
- Bhupen Khakhar, A Retrospective, Timothy Hyman, The National Gallery of Modern Art and the Fine Art Resource, 2003
- Desai, Mahendra; Bhupen Khakhar (1983). A Man Labelled Bhupen Khakhar Branded As Painter. Bombay: Identity People. OCLC 19123585.

== See also ==
- M. F. Hussain
- Ghulam Mohammed Sheikh
- Vivan Sundaram
