= Nasreen Mohamedi =

Indian artist (1937–1990)

- Born: 1937; Karachi, British India (now in Pakistan)
- Died: 1990 (aged 52–53); Kihim, India
- Known for: Painting, Photography, Collage
- Movement: Abstract Expressionism
- Family: Tyabji family

Nasreen Mohamedi (1937–1990) was an Indian artist best known for her line-based drawings, and is today considered one of the most essential modern artists from India. Despite being relatively unknown outside of her native country during her lifetime, Mohamedi's work has been the subject of remarkable revitalisation in international critical circles and has received popular acclaim over the last decade. Her work has been exhibited at the Museum of Modern Art (MoMA) in New York, the Kiran Nadar Museum of Art in New Delhi, documenta in Kassel, Germany, and at Talwar Gallery, which organised the first solo exhibition of her work outside of India in 2003, Today, Mohamedi is considered one of the major figures of the art of the twentieth century. Mohamedi is a member of the Tyabji family.

== Life and career ==
Born in 1937 in Karachi, India, in what became western Pakistan some ten years after her birth, Mohamedi lived, even from her early years, a cosmopolitan life. She was born into the elite Tyabji family, a Suleymani Bohra family She was one of eight children. Her mother died when she was very young. Her father owned a photographic equipment shop in Bahrain, among other business ventures. Her family moved to Mumbai in 1944, and later Mohamedi attended St. Martin's School of the Arts, in London, from 1954 to 1957. After living briefly with her family in Bahrain, Mohamedi studied on a scholarship in Paris from 1961 to 1963, where she also worked at a printmaking atelier, and on her return to India, joined the Bhulabhai Desai Institute for the Arts in Mumbai. Here she met other artists working at the time, including V.S. Gaitonde, M.F. Husain and Tyeb Mehta. Sometime after she joined the Bhulabhai Desai Institute, her first solo exhibition was hosted at Gallery 59. It was in Mumbai where she met abstractionist Jeram Patel, who went on to become her friend and colleague, while Gaitonde served as her mentor.

She settled in Baroda in 1972, where she taught Fine Art at Maharaja Sayajirao University, and would continue teaching until her death in 1990. She also travelled abroad extensively, spending time in Kuwait, Bahrain, Japan, the United States of America, Turkey, and Iran over the course of her life. Travel provided an essential source of inspiration for Mohamedi, who photographed and kept diaries throughout her life. Not only was she influenced by the deserts, Islamic architecture, and Zen aesthetics that she was exposed to during her travels, but, as Susette Min notes, "Mohamedi was deeply and intensely aware, as indicated in her photographs and journal entries, of herself and her body moving in time." During the last decade of her life, Mohamedi's motor functions gradually deteriorated due to Huntington's Chorea; she was able, however, to retain control of her drawing hand, and continued to create until her death in 1990 in Kihim, India at age at age 53.

== Influences ==
In the West, Mohamedi is most often associated with Agnes Martin, with whom she was paired at the 2007 documenta in Kassel, Germany. However, Mohamedi was not aware of the American artist and her paintings until late in her life. V.S. Gaitonde and Tyeb Mehta were Mohamedi's mentors in the 1960s. Despite working at a time when the tendency was toward figurative or representational work, Mohamedi developed her own style.

In her diaries, Mohamedi makes reference to Kasimir Malevich and Wassily Kandinsky, both of whom she admired and claimed as influences on her work. In 1970, at what Kapur names as a critical point in her career, Mohamedi wrote in her diary, "Again I am reassured by Kandinsky – the need to take from an outer environment and bring it an inner necessity."

Mohamedi is often associated with the American minimalism of the 1960s and 1970s and likened to artists such as Carl Andre, Ad Reinhardt, Barnett Newman, Mark Rothko, Richard Tuttle, and John Cage. Eva Hesse has also been comparative example to Mohamedi, especially her role as a teacher and mentor. Mohamedi's travel also had an influence on her work. The emotive aspect of her work has been cited as influenced by Sufi, while her combination of geometry and Arabesque line is often traced to an exposure to Islamic design, especially the architecture of Iran, Turkey, and Rajasthan.

== Work ==
Mohamedi's work defies categorisation; the result of a disciplined and sustained effort to craft an individual formal vocabulary, it remains without parallel, the product and artefact of Mohamedi's distinctive personality, process, and aesthetic values. In some of her early work, one can see attempts to capture the human form. She explored various mediums such as sketches, canvas based watercolour and oils to pencil and graphite. Her preferred medium of work was pencil and paper. She drew delicate but deliberate lines. She experimented with grid like formations and varying gradations at acute angles. What stood out in her works was her perception of light and shade. Although it is often difficult to temporally locate her work – she often left pieces untitled and undated – many critics have segmented her oeuvre into three general periods: an early period of sketches and semi-representational collage in the 1950s to mid-1960s, a "classic" period of increasingly non-representational forms, including her signature grid-based drawings, and a mature style in pen and ink. Although her work, especially the mature drawings of the 1970s and 1980s, is disciplined, even austere, it remains highly rhythmic – releasing the energy and movement of natural phenomena through line. The grid that so often provides a spatial environment for her drawings is less a limitation than a framework for her compositions, allowing, in the words of Deepak Talwar, the “poetry within structure” to emerge.

Mohamedi's work can be found in the permanent collection of The Metropolitan Museum of Art (MET), New York, NY; the Museum of Modern Art (MoMA), New York, NY; the Art Institute of Chicago, Chicago, IL; Kiran Nadar Museum of Art, New Delhi, India; and Queensland Art Gallery, Queensland, Australia.

Mohamedi has been the subject of solo exhibitions at The Metropolitan Museum of Art (MET Breuer), New York (2016); Museo Nacional Centro de Arte Reina Sofia, Madrid, Spain (2015); Tate, Liverpool, UK (2014); Kiran Nadar Museum of Art, India (2013); and The Drawing Center, New York (2005).

Her work was included in the 2021 exhibition Women in Abstraction at the Centre Pompidou and the Guggenheim Bilbao. It has also appeared at the Museum of Contemporary Art in Los Angeles, Beyond Form: Lines of Abstraction, 1950 - 1970 at the Turner Contemporary in London in 2023, and another 2023 touring group exhibition titled Action, Gesture, Paint Women Artists and Global Abstraction 1940–70 at Whitechapel Gallery in London, the Fondation Vincent Van Gogh in Arles, France; and the Kunsthalle Bielefeld in Bielefeld, Germany.

=== Photography ===
Beginning in the 1950s and early 1960s, Mohamedi began photographing her surrounding environment – not only during her frequent travels, but in the course of her daily life. Her photographs were more than documentary however; photos from the 1980s, for example, like her late work in pen and ink, are abstracted to the point of becoming non-representational. Her friend and art historian Geeta Kapur has placed Mohamedi's photographs between the artistic and the real, stating that they create "an allegory of (dis)placement between the subject and the object."

The photographs, although neither preparations for her drawings nor works incomplete in themselves, help to illuminate the principles that inform all of Mohamedi's work; as Gregory Galligan notes, "Mohamedi's is...a roaming, cursive, meandering consciousness, which lights effortlessly upon fragments in a landscape, the cityscape and Islamic architectural forms, such as the stepped cornice of an early mosque observed in extreme close-up...Spare, nearly weightless and almost entirely self-effacing, Mohamedi's aesthetic is ultimately about focusing consciousness back onto itself with the aid of an abstract foil." The first exhibition of Mohamedi's photowork outside of India was in 2003, at Talwar Gallery in New York. Her photography was based on themes such as desert landscapes, seascapes, weaving patterns, the architecture of Fatehpur Sikri, and modern structures.
