= Jyotsna Bhatt =

Indian ceramicist and potter (1940–2020)

Jyotsna Jyoti Bhatt
- Born: 6 March 1940; Mandvi, Kutch State, British India
- Died: 11 July 2020 (aged 80); Vadodara, Gujarat, India
- Known for: Ceramics, pottery
- Spouse: Jyoti Bhatt

Jyotsna Jyoti Bhatt (6 March 1940 – 11 July 2020) was an Indian ceramist and potter. She first studied at and then for forty years taught at the Maharaja Sayajirao University of Baroda.

== Biography ==
Jyotsna Bhatt was born on 6 March 1940 in Mandvi, Kutch State (now Kutch, Gujarat). She studied at the Sir J. J. School of Art in Bombay (now Mumbai) for a year. Later she joined the Maharaja Sayajirao University of Baroda in 1958 to study sculpture under Sankho Chaudhuri. She became interested in ceramics there. She studied ceramics under Jolyon Hofsted at the Brooklyn Museum Art School in the borough of Brooklyn in New York City in the United States during the mid 1960s. She returned to India and settled in Baroda (now Vadodara). In 1972, she joined the Department of Sculpture's ceramic studio in the Faculty of Fine Arts, Maharaja Sayajirao University of Baroda as a professor. She worked there for 40 years and retired as the Head of the Department of Ceramics in 2002.

Jyotsna Bhatt died on 11 July 2020, two days after suffering a stroke. She was cremated at Vadi Wadi crematorium in Baroda.

== Style ==
Bhatt's works are collected across the world. During her long career she experimented with both stoneware and terracotta. In her ceramic work, she preferred matte and satin matte glazes in combination with teal blue to moss green and other earth tones. She frequently used alkaline earths, amorphous moulds and various minerals merging modern and traditional styles in her works. Her works reflected her interest in nature. Her numerous works depict cats, dogs, birds, lotus buds, toys and platters.

== Personal life ==
Jyotsna Bhatt met Jyoti Bhatt, a painter, during her college years and they married later. They lived in Vadodara. They had a daughter, Jaii.
