= Gulam Mohammed Sheikh =

Indian artist

Ghulam Mohammed Sheikh
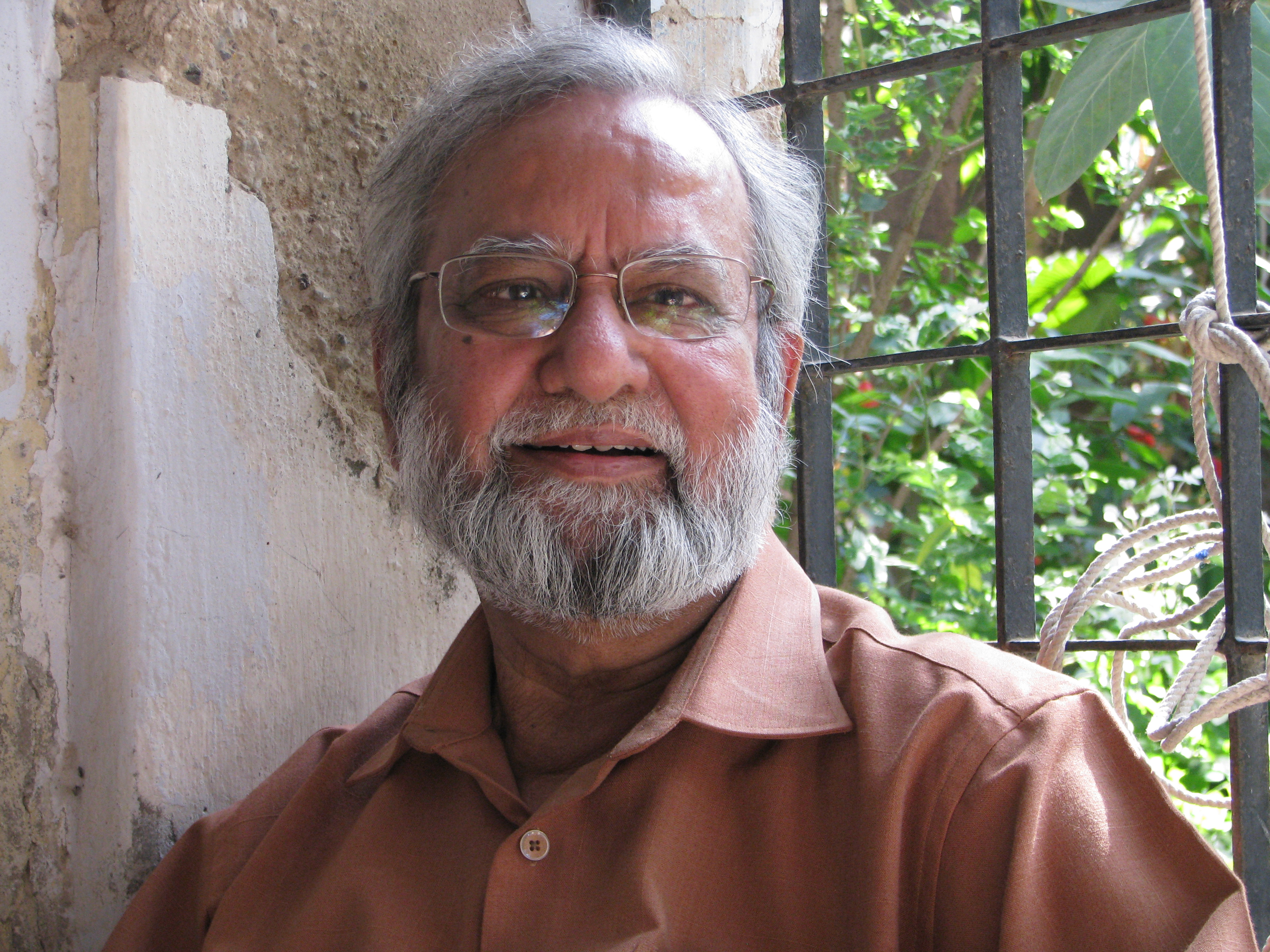
- Mohammed Sheikh in 2008
- Born: 16 February 1937 (age 89); Surendranagar, Gujarat, British India
- Known for: Painting
- Movement: Baroda Group
- Spouse: Nilima Sheikh

Ghulam Mohammed Sheikh (born 16 February 1937) is a painter, poet and art critic from Gujarat, India. He was awarded the Padma Shri in 1983 and Padmabhushan in 2014 for his contribution in field of art.

== Early life ==
Sheikh was born on 16 February 1937 in Surendranagar (now in Saurashtra region of Gujarat, India). He matriculated in 1955. He completed B.A. in Fine Art in 1959 and M.A. in 1961 from Faculty of Fine Arts, Maharaja Sayajirao University of Baroda. He received ARCA from Royal College of Art, London in 1966.

== Career ==
In 1960, he joined as a professor of Fine Arts in the Faculty of Fine Arts, M.S. University, Baroda. His teaching positions have included teaching art history in the Faculty of Fine Arts, Baroda (1960–63 and 1967–81,) and as Professor of Painting, Faculty of Fine Arts, Baroda (1982–1993). He has been a Visiting Artist at the Art Institute of Chicago in 1987 and 2002, and a Writer/Artist in Residence at Civitella Ranieri Center, Umbertide, Italy (1998), at the University of Pennsylvania (2002), and at Montalvo, California (2005).

Sheikh has been a major figure in the world of Indian art for more than four decades. He has participated in major exhibitions all over the world and his works are displayed in private and public collections including the National Gallery of Modern Art in New Delhi, Victoria and Albert Museum in London and the Peabody Essex Museum in Salem, USA. Ghulam has been active not merely as an artist but also as a teacher and writer.

His collection of Gujarati surrealistic poems, Athwa (1974) won him considerable critical acclaim. He has also written a prose series, Gher Jatan and edited special issues of Kshitij as well as Vishwamanav and Sayujya magazines. American Chitrakala (1964) is his translated work.

== Style ==
"Sheikh's art is by its nature," writes Chaitanya Sambrani, "one that takes on task of narrating, and therefore, recreating the world. There is a close tie-in between this narrative and an act of mapping the world, which gives to the speaking subject the possibility of addressing the world as his/her own". Recently Sheikh had been working on the Mappa Mundi series where he defines new horizons and ponders over to locate himself in. Sheikh construes these personal universes enthused from the miniature shrines where he urges the audience to exercise the freedom to build up their Mappa Mundi.

== Personal life ==
Ghulam Mohammed Sheikh lives with his artist-wife Nilima in Vadodara, India.

== Awards ==
- National Award, Lalit Kala Akademi, New Delhi, 1962.
- Padmashri by Government of India, 1983
- Kalidas Samman, Madhya Pradesh Government, 2002.
- Padma Bhushan by Government of India, 2014
- Sahitya Akademi Award for Gujarati, 2022

== Exhibitions ==
- Solo Exhibition at Jehangir Art Gallery, Bombay, 1960
- National Exhibition, New Delhi, 1962
- The VII Tokyo Biennale, Tokyo, Japan, 1963
- Cinquieme Biennale de Paris, Paris, 1967
- 25 Years of Indian Art, Lalit Kala Akademi, Rabindra Bhavan, New Delhi, 1972
- Contemporary painting of India, Belgrade, Warsaw, Sofia, Brussels, 1974
- III Triennale (India), Rabindra Bhavan, New Delhi, 1975
- Place for People (6 artists), Jehangir Art Gallery, Bombay and Rabindra Bhavan, New Delhi, 1981
- Contemporary Indian Art, Royal Academy of Arts, Festival of India, London, 1982
- Returning Home, Solo Exhibition (a retrospective selection of work from 1968 to 1985) at Centre Georges Pompidou, Musee National d'Art Modeme, Paris, 1985
- Timeless Art, exhibition and auction, Times of India sesquicentennial at Victoria Terminus, Bombay, 1989
- Realism as an Attitude, IV Asian Art Show, Fukuoka, Japan, 1995
- Two-person show (with Bhupen Khakhar), Walsh Gallery, Chicago, USA, 2002

== Publications ==
2017, 'Nirkhe te Nazar', a collection of writings on visual arts in Gujarati, Samvad Prakashan, Vadodara & Khsitij Sansodhan Prakashan Kendra, Mumbai.

- Athwa (poems in Gujarati), Butala, Vadodara 1974.
- Laxma Goud, monograph on the artist, Hyderabad, A. P. Lalit Kala Akademi, Hyderabad 1981.
- Contemporary Art of Baroda (ed.), Tulika, New Delhi 1996.
- Essays, articles and papers in 'Marg', 'Journal of Arts & Ideas', 'Lalit Kala Contemporary' as well as Hindi and Gujarati journals.
- Exhibition catalogues of K G Subramanyan, Jeram Patel, Laxma Goud, DLN Reddy, D Devraj, etc.

== Bibliography ==
- Geeta Kapur, Contemporary Indian Art, Royal Academy, London,1982
- Ajay Sinha, Revolving Routes, Form, Dhaka, Bangladesh, 1983
- From Art to Life (interview with Gieve Patel for exhibition catalogue), Returning Home, Centre Georges Pompidou, Paris 1985
- Timothy Hyman, Sheikh's One Painting, Returning Home (exhibition catalogue), Centre Georges Pompidou, Paris 1985
- New Figuration in India, Art International, Spring 1990
- Geeta Kapur Riddles of the Sphinx, in Journeys (exhibition catalogue), CMC Gallery, New Delhi, 1991
- Kamala Kapoor, New Thresholds of Meaning, Art India, Quarter 3, 2001
- Palimpsest, interview with Kavita Singh, (exhibition catalogue), Vadehra Art Gallery, New Delhi, Sakshi Gallery, Mumbai, 2001
- Kamala Kapoor in Valerie Breuvart (ed.) VITAMIN P : New Perspectives in Painting, Phaidon Press, London/ New York 2002
- Gayatri Sinha, The Art of Ghulam Mohammed Sheikh, Lustre Press / Roli Books, New Delhi, 2002
- Zecchini Laetitia, "More than one world: An interview with Ghulam Mohammed Sheikh", Journal of Postcolonial Writing, Vol. 53, 1-2, 2017

== See also ==
Awards
Preceded by Yagnesh Dave	Recipient of the Sahitya Akademi Award winners for Gujarati; 2022	Succeeded by Vinod Joshi
