= Bilbil =

Bilbil is the word for 'nightingale' in various Middle Eastern languages. It may also be:

- Bilbil Klosi
- Bilbil language
- Mount Bilbil
- Bilbil juglet

== See also ==
- Bilbija
- Bülbül
