= Siddharth Pandey =

Indian historian and photographer

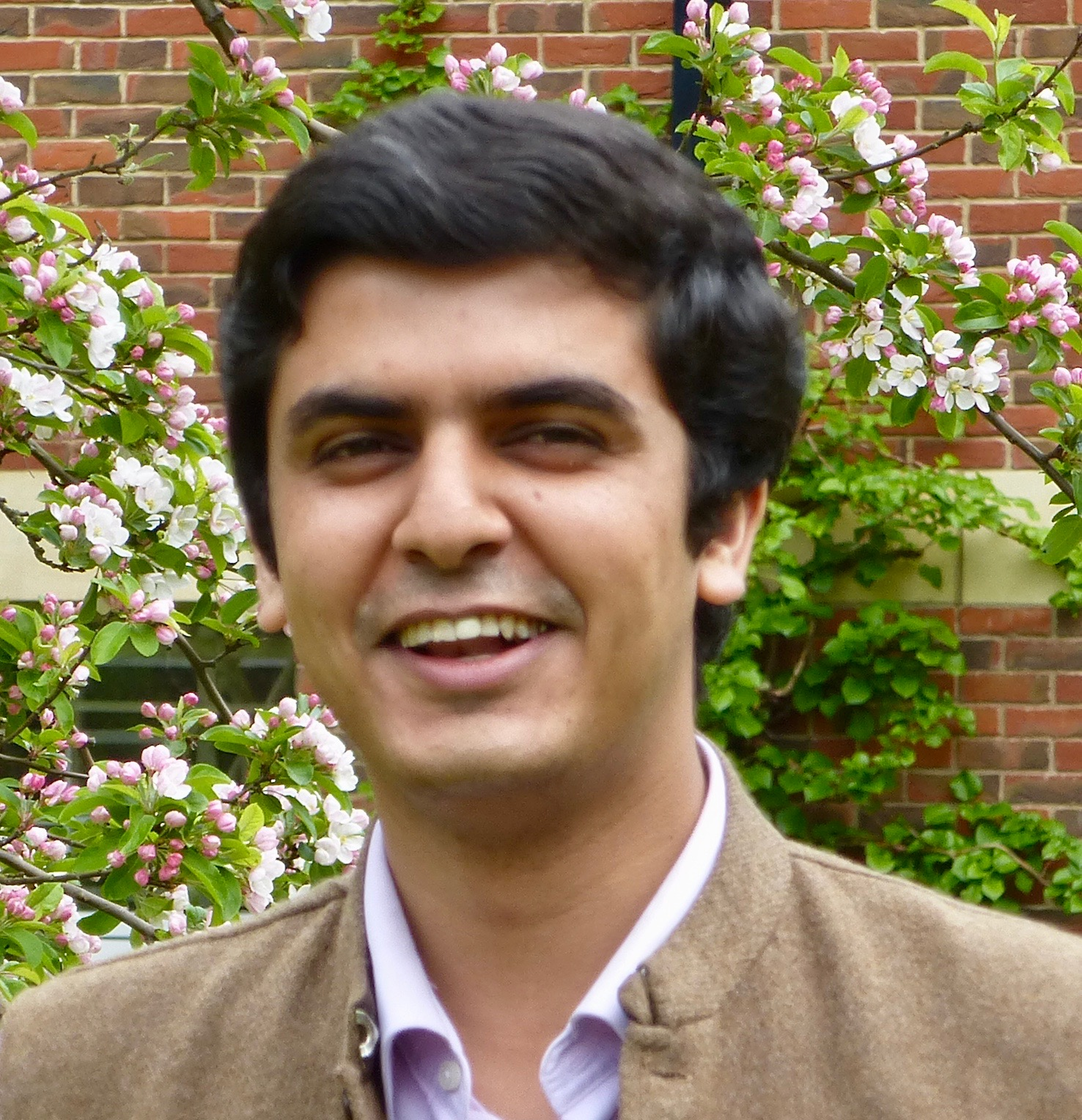
- Born: 8 July 1987 (age 39)
- Education: B.A.(Hons) English, Delhi University; M.A. English, Delhi University; MPhil English, Delhi University; MPhil Children's Literature, Cambridge University; PhD Literature and Materiality Studies, Cambridge University
- Occupations: Writer, literary scholar, cultural historian, curator, and photographer
- Known for: Writings on Indian hill stations; Writings on popular culture and cultural aesthetics; Writings on fantasy literature; Photography of landscapes and architecture
- Notable work: Fossil (2021)

Siddharth Pandey (born 8 July 1987) is a writer, literary scholar, cultural historian, curator, photographer, and musician from Shimla, Himachal Pradesh, India. His writings on Indian hill stations, popular culture, and materiality studies have appeared in academic publications as well as various Indian national-level English newspapers and online news forums. His landscape and architecture photographs have featured in solo and thematic exhibitions in India and the United Kingdom, including at the Victoria and Albert Museum at London. His first book of poetry, Fossil (2021), was a finalist for the Banff Mountain Book Awards in 2022.

== Education ==
Pandey obtained a BA (Hons), Masters (MA) and MPhil in English Literature from the Delhi University. After that, he obtained an MPhil in Children's Literature and a PhD in English and Materiality Studies from the University of Cambridge (2019). At Cambridge, he was based at the Homerton College. His doctoral advisor was Maria Nikolajeva. His doctoral thesis, titled Crafting, Conjuring, and the Aesthetic of Making: Towards a Materialistic Understanding of Fantasy, studies the ways in which ‘making’ - in forms such as human craftsmanship and non-human growth - impacts the creation of ‘wonder’ in the worlds of fantasy literature. Pandey has also pursued a parallel research interest in the evolving cultural and aesthetic politics of Shimla in particular and Himachal Pradesh more generally.

Pandey has been the recipient of several scholarships and fellowships. Among others, these include a Cambridge Commonwealth Shared Scholarship, a Cambridge International Scholarship, Charles Wallace India Trust grants, and a research support grant from the Paul Mellon Centre.

Pandey has held postdoctoral fellowships at Yale University, LMU Munich, Käte Hamburger Centre for Research - Dis:connectivity in process of globalisation (Munich), and the M.S. Merian - R. Tagore International Centre of Advanced Studies: Metamorphoses of the Political (New Delhi).

== Reception of writings ==
Pandey has researched and written about fantasy and children's literature, hill stations in India, nature writing, craft theory, folk culture, cinema studies, and pop culture. Pandey's writings have appeared in peer-reviewed journals and academic anthologies. Pandey's writings have also appeared on several South Asian newspapers and mass-media forums. These include The Hindu, The Indian Express, The Pioneer, The Tribune, Frontline, Live Wire, Outlook, Quint, Scroll.in, and The News.

=== Indian hill stations ===
Jeffrey A. Auerbach writes of Pandey's essay 'Simla or Shimla: The Indian Political Re-appropriation of Little England' (2014) as a 'postcolonial counter-narrative' to the colonial, predominantly British origins of Shimla as the summer capital of the British Raj. An essay by Pandey on Indian hill stations appears in Between Heaven and Earth: Writings on the Indian Hills (2022), an anthology of eminent historical and contemporary non-fiction writing on Indian hills, selected and edited by Ruskin Bond and Bulbul Sharma. In her book review of this anthology in The Tribune, Sarika Sharma comments: "Siddharth Pandey's essay is a refreshing take on the femininity of hill stations in a country brimming with toxic masculinity."

=== Fantasy literature ===
Commenting on Pandey's work in fantasy literature, Simone Kotva of the University of Cambridge writes: "Siddharth's work looks at the representation of magic in fantasy and speculative fiction. His work upends the clichéd understanding of magic as escapist, free-form and otherworldly and demonstrates instead its close relationship to artistic making, landscape and attentiveness to material becoming." The Indian naturalist and educator Yuvan Aves extends Pandey's arguments about the non-centralised, dispersed nature of magic in imagined magical worlds (in modern western fantasy literature) to his own understanding of the natural world, wherein he regards 'the ocean and the living earth' as intrinsically a magical place, where 'everything lives, everything speaks'.

=== Aesthetics ===
Several of Pandey's writings in mass media have been about the aesthetics of nature, cinema, everyday culture, and craft. Felix Ehlers of LMU Munich writes that Pandey's work enables one to see beauty and aesthetics as an alternative, creative approach to mediation in the Anthropocene, rather than the stereotypically dystopian views around this age. As a Fellow of the Käte Hamburger Research Centre on Global Dis:connect in Munich (2022–23), Pandey organised a two-day workshop on the theme 'Ecology, aesthetics and everyday cultures of modernity' in July 2023.

=== Poetry ===
Pandey's book Fossil (2021), his geo-mythological-poetic exploration of the Himalayas, was a finalist in the 'Mountain Fiction and Poetry' category at the Banff Mountain Book Festival of Canada in 2022. Banff mountain book awards are considered major recognitions for mountain literature in all forms from across the world. Fossil also features in the essay 'Otters for Books for Children and Families' by the British artist Jackie Morris on her website.

== Photographic exhibitions ==
Pandey is primarily known as a photographer of built and natural landscapes. He has had a longstanding interest in the colonial-era built heritage of Shimla and its interaction with the surrounding natural landscape, as well as in old kinds of Indian and European architectures.

- In May 2013, Pandey held his first photographic exhibition at the University of Cambridge.
- In October 2013, the Gaiety Theatre, Shimla, hosted a four-day solo exhibition by Pandey, titled 'Landscapes of Imagination: A Photographic Display of British Spaces'.
- In June 2014, the Gaiety Theatre, Shimla, hosted a solo exhibition by Pandey, titled 'In the Image of the Other: Visualising Shimla'.
- In 2016, while pursuing his PhD at Cambridge, Pandey was invited to host a six-month exhibition at the Oriental Museum, Durham University. This exhibition took place over 14 October 2016 – 30 March 2017, and was titled 'In the Image of the Other: Visualising a British-Himalayan Town, Shimla'.
- In 2016, Pandey was alongside commissioned as an official photographer by the Victoria and Albert Museum at London to document 'colonial India's crafted materiality' for an exhibition on John Lockwood Kipling planned for 2017. This exhibition, which took place over 14 January - 2 April 2017 at the Victoria and Albert Museum, featured Pandey's photographs of the buildings designed by Kipling in Mumbai, among others.
- In July 2023, Pandey hosted an online solo exhibition titled 'Highland Homes', which curated fifty of his photographs displaying the natural and cultural heritage of the Indian Himalayas. This exhibition was in conjunction with a two-day conference Pandey organised and hosted at the Käte Hamburger Centre for Global Dis:connect in Munich, on the theme 'Ecology, Aesthetics and Everyday Cultures of Modernity'.

== Music ==
Pandey is a pianist, and has composed pieces inspired by Himalayan and Celtic influences. He also researches, writes, and gives lecdems on music.

== Bibliography ==
=== Academic publications ===
- Pandey, Siddharth. "Interrogating Masculinity through the Child Figure in Bombay Cinema." Networking Knowledge: Journal of the MeCCSA Postgraduate Network 4, no. 1 (2011).
- Pandey, Siddharth. "Simla or Shimla: The Indian political re-appropriation of Little England 1." In Consuming Architecture, pp. 133–153. Routledge, 2014.
- Pandey, Siddharth. "Framing Simla: The Queen of Hill Stations and the Politics of Iconography". In Visual Histories of South Asia, pp.. Primus Books, 2018.
- Pandey, Siddharth. "Crafting, Conjuring, and the Aesthetic of Making: Towards a Materialistic Understanding of Fantasy." PhD diss., 2019.
- Pandey, Siddharth. "Emplacing Tasks of Magic: Hand, Land, and the Generation of Fantasy Taskscape in Terry Pratchett's Tiffany Aching Series." GeoHumanities 6, no. 1 (2020): 39-50.
- Pandey, Siddharth. "" Handling" Wonder: Tools, Tasks, and the Enchantment of Materialistic Engagement in Philip Pullman's His Dark Materials Trilogy." The Lion and the Unicorn 46, no. 2 (2022): 224-243.

=== Poetry ===
- Pandey, Siddharth. Fossil. A Published Event, 2021.
