= Anis Farooqi =

Indian painter (1938–1994)

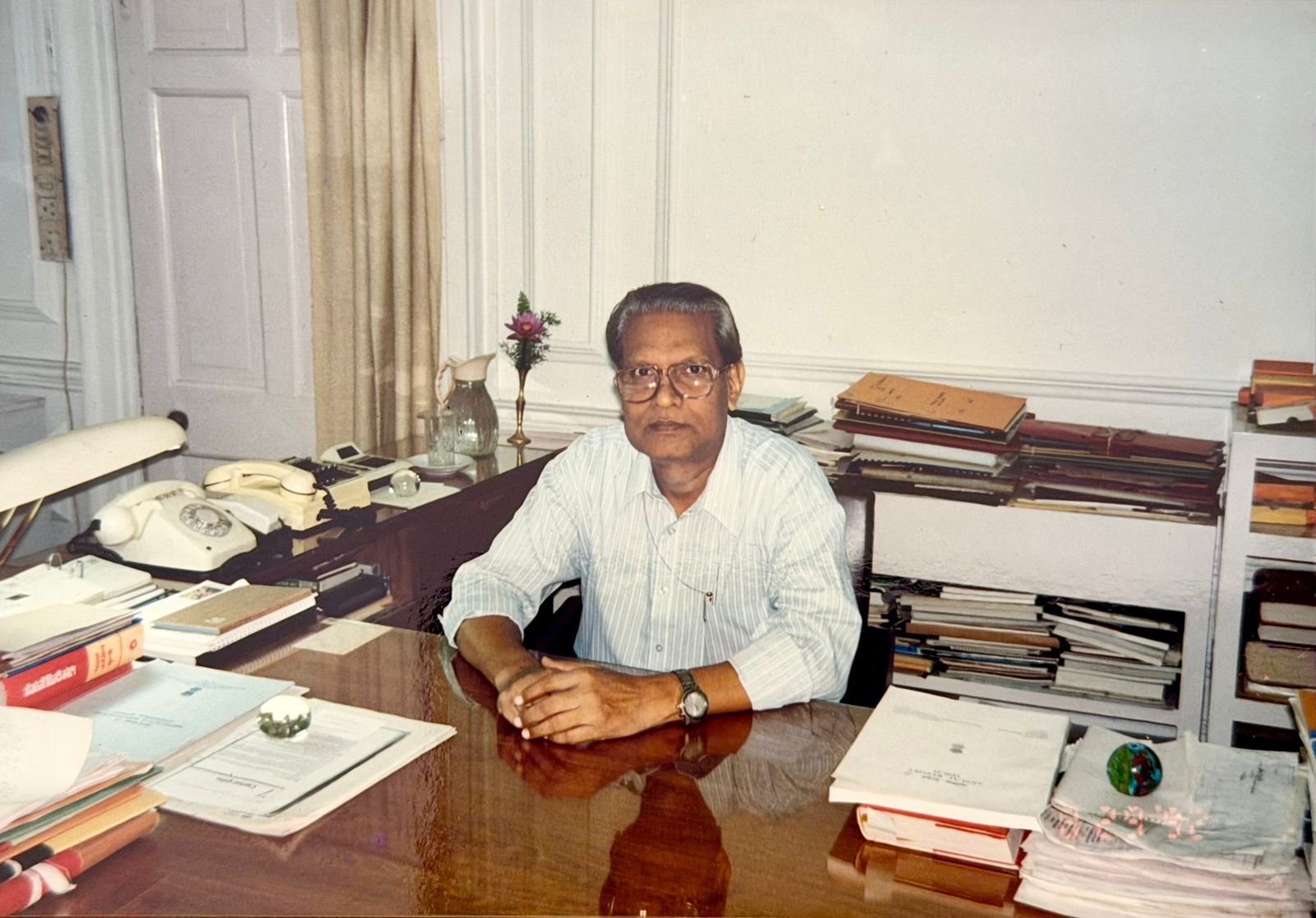

Director, National Gallery of Modern Art, New Delhi
- In office 1985–1994
- Preceded by: Laxmi Prasad Sihare
- Succeeded by: Anjali Sen

Personal details
- Born: 29 January 1938
- Died: 8 September 1994 (aged 56)
- Relations: Two Daughters: Yuman Hussain & Dr Zeba F Alam
- Education: PhD Agra University, Diploma in Fine Arts Sir J. J. School of Art
- Awards: 32nd National Exhibition of Art by Lalit Kala Akademi

Anis Farooqi (29 January 1938 – 8 September 1994) was an Indian painter, scholar, art historian and former director of the National Gallery of Modern Art, New Delhi. He has been the recipient of 32nd National Award by Lalit Kala Akademi in 1989.

== Education ==
Farooqi completed his Diploma in Drawing and Painting from Sir J.J. School of Art, Mumbai, in 1959. After that, he finished his MA in Drawing and Painting from Agra University in 1962. He later earned his PhD in the History of Indian Art from Agra University under the late Professor Nirharanjan Ray.

== Work ==
Following the completion his PhD, Farooqi joined the National Gallery of Modern Art. After two decades of service, he was appointed director of the NGMA. During this time, he initiated the publication of a comprehensive catalog documenting 3,000 works from the Gallery's then collection of 14,000 artworks. The catlogue recorded the details such as artist's name, acquisition number, title, and medium.

Farooqi managed and organised exhibitions and also archived the works of many artists. He curated the exhibition 'Indian Women Sculptors' in 1987. In 1989, along with GM Sheikh and Geeta Kapur, he organised the exhibition Birth of Modernity at the NGMA as part of the Festival of France in India.

Farooqi’s artworks are held in several notable collections. These include the National Gallery of Modern Art in New Delhi, State Lalit Kala Akademi in Uttar Pardesh, and Sahitya Kala Parishad in Delhi. His works are also part of the collections at the Punjab Government Museum and the Punjab University Museum in Chandigarh. Other institutions that hold his work include the British India Corporation in Kanpur, Ghalib Academy, Doordarshan, and the Institute of Medicine and Medical Research in New Delhi.

His academic works have been part of course work in the Faculty of Arts at several institutions and board including CBSE and Punjab University, Jamia Millia Islamia etc. His book 'Hindustani Masavri' was the part of fine arts curriculum in senior secondary examination of CBSE till 2012. His another book 'Art of India and Persia' was the output of his doctoral thesis. He has written biographical sketch of many artists including Sayed Haider Raza, MF Hussain, Satish Gujral, Nalini Mehta and others. In 1985, he along with Culture Secretary of Karnataka Govt Chiranjeev Singh, and through their combined efforts, they initiated the establishment of the NGMA Bangalore.
