= Hermann Goetz (art historian) =

German art historian (1898–1976)

- Born: July 17, 1898; Karlsruhe, German Empire
- Died: July 8, 1976 (aged 77); Heidelberg, West Germany
- Education: Ludwig-Maximilians-Universität München
- Occupations: Art historian and museum director
- Known for: Scholarly contributions on Indian art history
- Title: Director of Baroda Museum & Picture Gallery
- Term: 1939–1953
- Spouse: Annimarie Goetz

Hermann Goetz (17 July 1898 – 8 July 1976) was a German art historian and museum director, known for his scholarly contributions in the field of Indian art history. He was the Director of the Baroda Museum & Picture Gallery, and the Director of history of art at the Heidelberg University's Südasien-Institut (South Asia Institute).

== Early life ==
Goetz was born in Karlsruhe, Germany, on 17 July 1898, and was educated at the Real-gymnasium in Munich. He served in the Germany military during the World War I.

Early in his career, during the World War I, Goetz was mainly interested in the Ottoman Turks. Later, he became interested in Iran (Persia), and subsequently, in the Persianate Mughal Empire of India. His work on the Indian art history started with the studies of the Mughal miniature painting. The map collection of the Berlin State Library included the "Jahangir album", a collection of Mughal-era paintings. Goetz studied this collection in detail, using his knowledge of figurative art, ethnography, and history.

In the 1920s, Goetz obtained a doctorate from the Ludwig-Maximilians-Universität München. The title of his thesis was Kostüm und Mode an den indischen Fürstenhöfen in der Grossmoghul-Zeit ("Costume and fashion at the Indian princely courts in the Great Mughal period"). He then joined the Ethnological Museum of Berlin as an assistant curator.

In 1931, when the German Weimar Republic was declining amid the Great Depression, Goetz migrated to the Netherlands. There, he became the assistant secretary of Leiden University's Kern Institute for Archaeology and Indian History, and the editor of Annual Bibliography of Indian Archaeology. His superior Jean Philippe Vogel, a reputed Indologist, became his mentor and Goetz started pursuing India-related research. At that time, there was a flood of foreign refugees in the Netherlands, and consequently, certain restrictions had been imposed on the employment of foreigners. As a result, Goetz was unable to take up a permanent position at the Leiden University. Under these circumstances, he decided to accept a grant to work in British India.

== In India ==
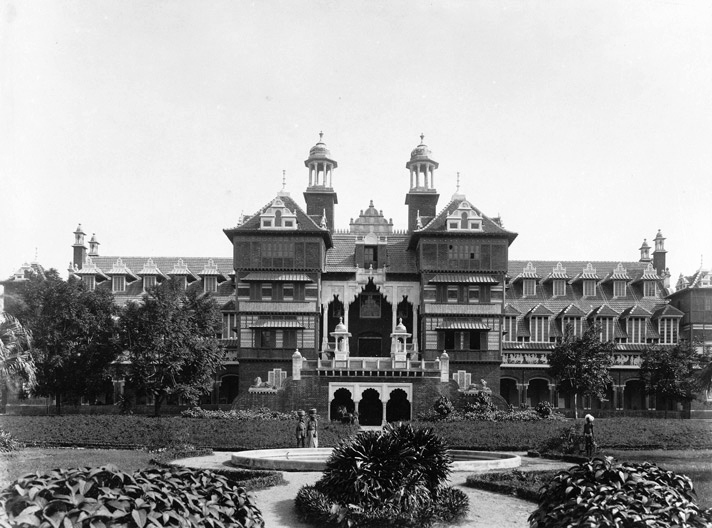
Baroda Museum

Hermann Goetz and his wife Annemarie moved to India in 1936. Goetz spent a substantial time studying the art of ancient and medieval India. In 1939, the Baroda State's ruler Sayajirao Gaekwad III appointed him as the Director of Baroda Museum & Picture Gallery.

Goetz was opposed to the Nazi regime of Germany. Despite this, when the World War II broke out, he was interned by the British administration of India because of his German nationality. During this internment, he spent time consolidating his research. After the war ended, he published numerous works.

Goetz worked at the Baroda Museum until 1953. During this time, he also established the journal Bulletin of the Baroda State Museum And Picture Gallery in 1942, and remained its editor until 1954. He helped set up a Department of Museology at the Maharaja Sayajirao University of Baroda, and served a professor of art history there. Subsequently, he moved from Baroda to New Delhi, where he became the Director of the National Gallery of Modern Art. Over the next two years, he reorganized the Gallery.

== Back in Germany ==
After having spent 19 years in India, Goetz contracted a tropical disease. Because of this, he decided to move back to Germany in 1955. There, he organized several displays and exhibitions of Indian art, and gave lectures on related topics. He returned to India in 1958 and then again in 1960-61. During these shorter stays in India, he organized another museum at Baroda. In 1961, he moved back to Germany permanently.

In Germany, Goetz became a professor of Oriental Art at the Heidelberg University's Südasien-Institut (South Asia Institute). He later served as the Director of history of art at the Institute. He visited India in 1971 to receive the Jawaharlal Nehru Award for his work on Indian art.

By his 75th birthday, Goetz had 383 published works, which included 32 books. In addition, he had written over 100 book reviews. He died on 8 July 1976.

== Bibliography ==
- Jonathan M. Bloom; Sheila S. Blair, eds. (2009). Grove Encyclopedia of Islamic Art & Architecture. Vol. 3. Oxford. ISBN 978-0-19-530991-1.
- Karl Jettmar (1976). "Originalveröffentlichung: Hermann Goetz" (PDF). East and West. 26 (3/4). Istituto Italiano per l'Africa e l'Oriente: 539–540.
