= National Gallery of Modern Art =

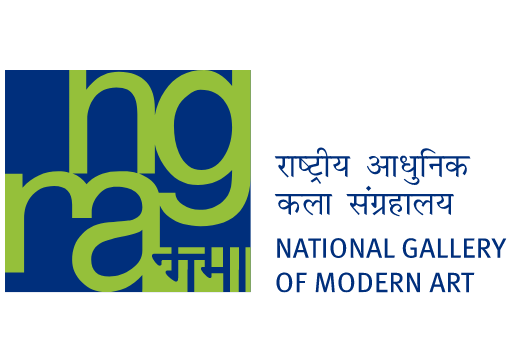

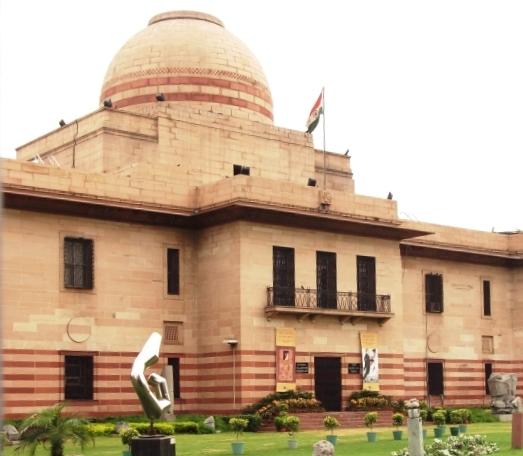
- The Jaipur House
- Interactive fullscreen map
- Established: 29 March 1954
- Location: Jaipur House, Rajpath, New Delhi
- Coordinates: 28°36′37″N 77°14′04″E
- Type: modern art museum
- Website: ngmaindia.gov.in

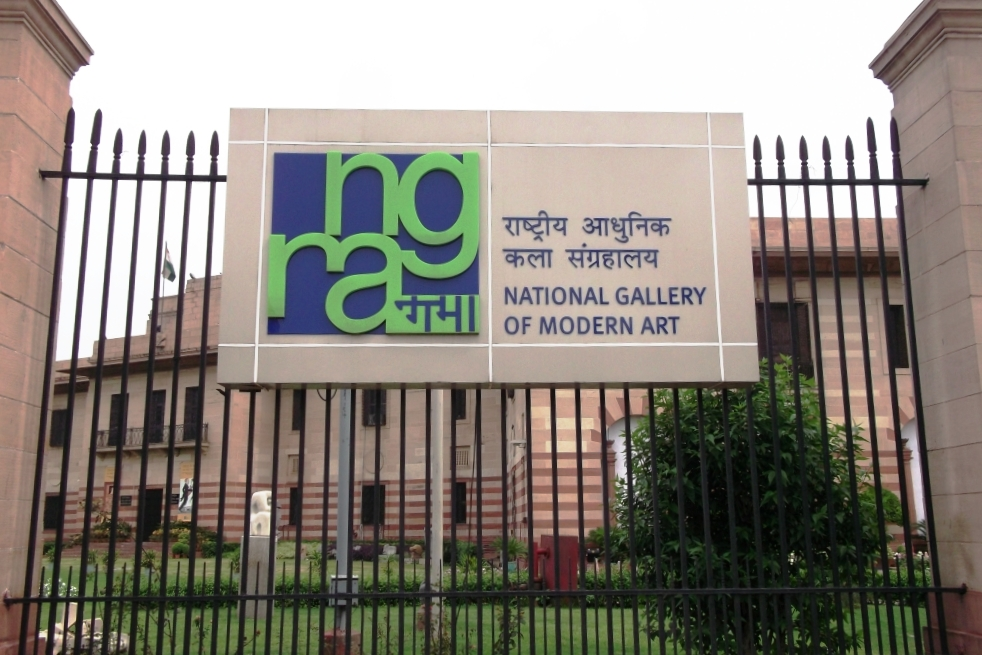
National Gallery of Modern Art, entrance signage

The National Gallery of Modern Art (NGMA) is the premier art gallery under the Indian Ministry of Culture. The main museum at Jaipur House in New Delhi was established on 29 March 1954 by the Government of India, with subsequent branches at Mumbai and Bangalore. Its collection of more than 17,000 works by 2000 plus artists includes artists such as Thomas Daniell, Raja Ravi Verma, Abanindranath Tagore, Rabindranath Tagore, Gaganendranath Tagore, Nandalal Bose, Jamini Roy, Amrita Sher-Gil as well as foreign artists including Nicholas Roerich. Some of the oldest works preserved here date back to 1857. With 12,000 square meters of exhibition space, the Delhi branch is one of the world's largest modern art museums.

== History ==
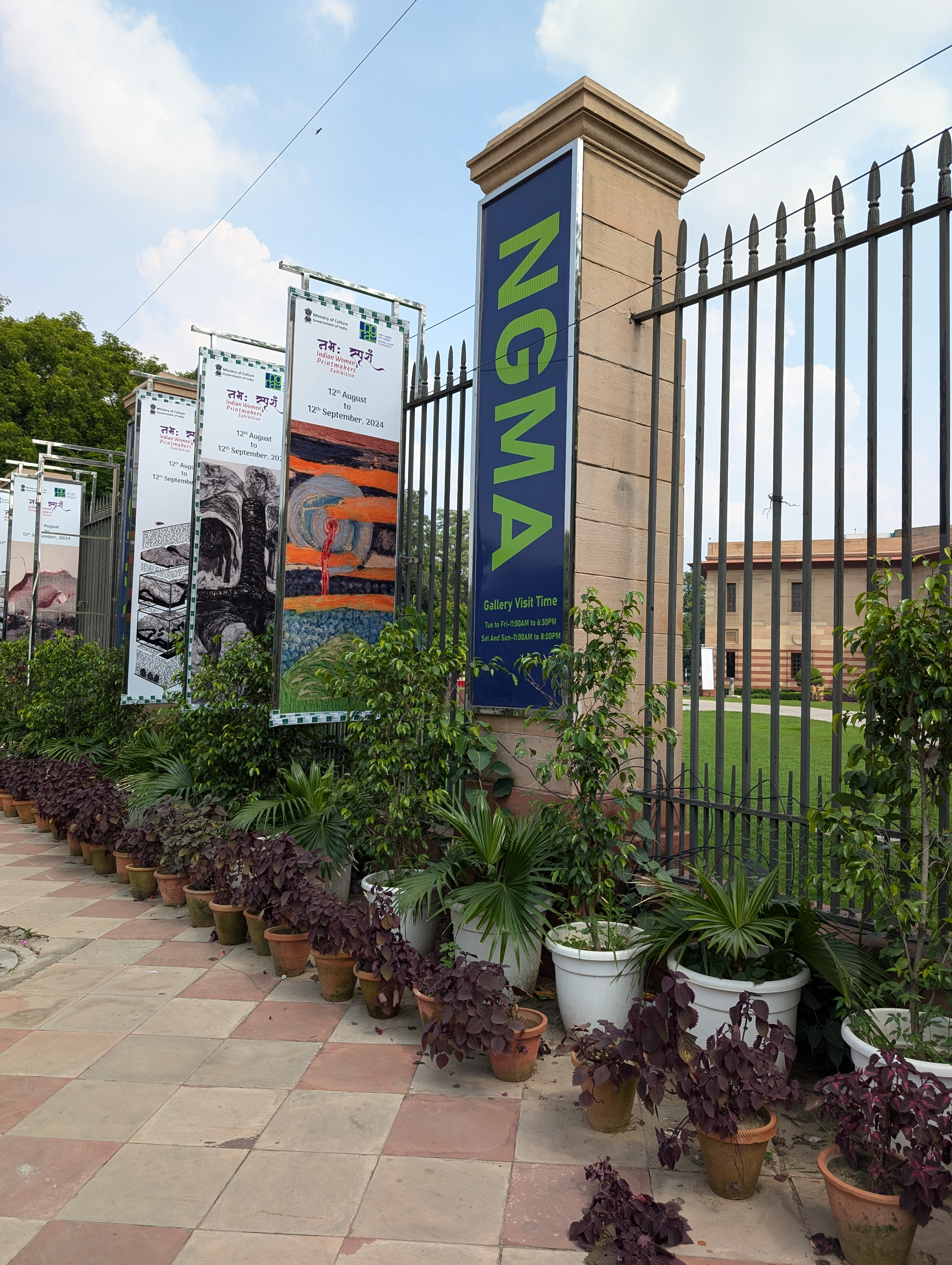
National Gallery of Modern Art, sidewalk

The first proposal for a National Art Gallery was made by a Delhi-based artists' organisation, the AIFACS, in 1938. This institution, initially registered as Delhi Fine Arts Society in 1929, was founded by artist–brothers Barada and Sarada Ukil who were students of Abanindranath Tagore. (Note: The All India Association of Fine Arts, Bombay, was set up in 1946 with G. Venkatachalam as president and members like Karl Khandalvala. The association organised the 3rd All India Conference for Arts in 1948 because it noted that the first two conferences in Delhi had not been able to form a central art organisation that was wholly representative. They received a sum of `21 lakh for arts, education and cultural activities from the Government of Bombay. They declared that arts did not depend on official support alone but needed individuals and groups to come together spontaneously. If AIFACS was interested in being an official body, AIAFA was asking for an autonomous artist association.) In 1946, the Society organised the First International Contemporary Art Exhibition that included paintings of modern French and English artists, as well as etchings from American artists. The exhibition coincided with the first All India conference, where a resolution appointing AIFACS as a central art body was passed. In subsequent years, however, AIFACS’ claims were diluted by the factions that arose among the artists, with the newly set up All India Association of Fine Arts, Bombay, putting forth its own agency as a central organisation at the Third All India Art conference in 1948.In 1949 Art Conference at Calcutta The government invited a consortium of artists and critics for this conference on visual arts — Stella Kramrisch, G. Venkatachalam, Nandalal Bose, Jamini Roy, O. C. Ganguly, Atul Bose, James H. Cousins and Percy Brown, among others — and asked for their suggestions on art institutions like the National Museum and the National Gallery of Art, and the educative role of art for the general public. On the issue of the Gallery, the participants at the seminar reacted in different ways. Some such as historian Dr Nihar Ranjan Ray encouraged the government to step in and set up the representative advisory body, while others like artist and founder member of the group in Delhi, Silpi Chakra, B. C. Sanyal, argued that it was wrong for the government to take the initiative away from the artists' hands. It passed a resolution for the early establishment of the National Art Gallery and the improvement of the National Museum, as well as the formation of the three Akademis as part of a Sub Commission for Culture of the Indian National Commission for Cooperation with UNESCO.

In 1953 the Society organised the Second International Exhibition of Contemporary Art in its new building, which the national daily 'The Statesman' described as 'no less than Venice Beinnale'. Though the idea of the National Gallery was floated in 1949, the state-supported NGMA was formally inaugurated by Vice-president Dr S.Radhakrishnan in 1954, in the presence of Prime Minister Jawaharlal Nehru. Hermann Goetz (1898–1976), a noted German art historian became its first curator and in time it added new facilities such as Art restoration services, an Art reference Library and a Documentation Centre. The Gallery opened with an exhibition of contemporary sculpture, apart from showcasing its initial collection of around 200 works, which consisted of paintings by Amrita Sher Gill, Rabindranath Tagore, Jamini Roy, Nandalal Bose, and M. A. R. Chugtai, among others.

=== Building ===
Situated at the end of Rajpath, in the Central Hexagon around the India Gate, the building was a former residential palace of the Maharaja of Jaipur, hence known as Jaipur House. The butterfly-shaped building with a central dome and built in 1936, and designed by Sir Arthur Blomfield, after the construction of Lutyens' Delhi. The Central Hexagon around the India Gate, where the buildings of leading princely states were situated, was itself designed by Sir Edwin Lutyens.

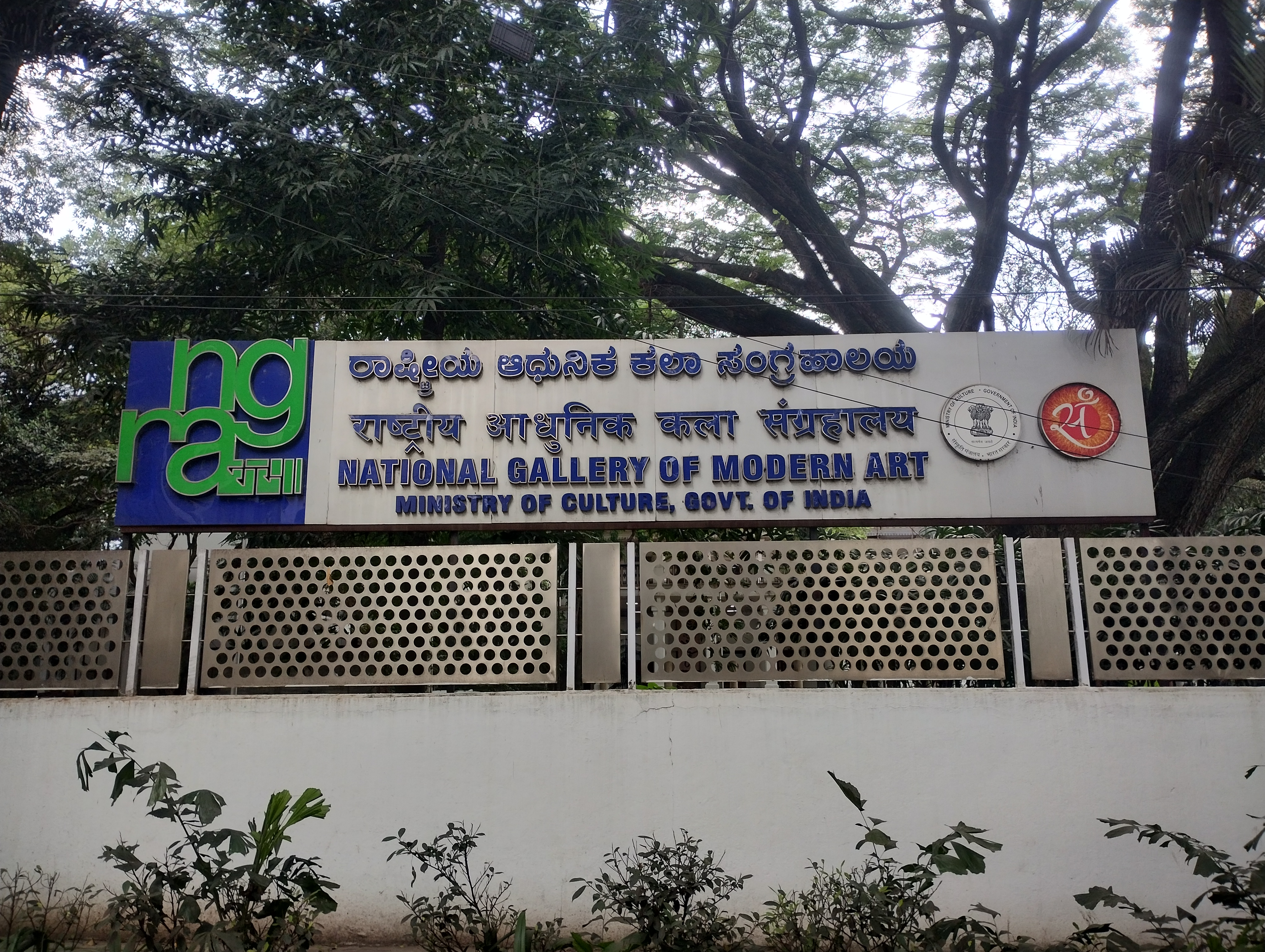
National Gallery of Modern Art, Bangalore (2025)

The gallery at Jaipur House opened with an exhibition of Indian sculptures, showcasing myriad of 65 Indian sculptures, displayed in five rooms of the Jaipur House, by 31 artists like Debi Prasad Roy Chowdhury, Ram Kinkar Baij, Sankho Chaudhuri, Dhanraj Bhagat and Sarbari Roy Chowdhury. This event was even curated by Hermann Goetz. The startup aim of the museum was the acquisition and preservation of art works from 1850 to till date, mainly paintings, sculptures and graphics and later also photographs.

== Administration ==
=== Director Generals ===
- Shri Adwaita Gadanayak, December 2016–December 2022
- Sanjeev Kishor Goutam, December 2023–present date

=== Directors ===
- Hermann Goetz, 1954–1956
- Mukul Dey, 1956–1958
- Pradosh Dasgupta, 1958–1970
- B. B. Lal, 1970–1971
- Laxmi Prasad Sihare, 1971–1984
- Anis Farooqi, 1985–1994
- Anjali Sen, 1994–2000
- Mukta Nidhi Samnotra, April 2000–December 2000
- K. N. Srivastava, January–March 2001
- Rajeev Lochan, 2001–2016
- Ritu Sharma, August 2018 – 2019
- Temsunaro Tripathi, August 2021–January 2024
- Pooja Hali, June 2024–present date

== Collections ==
The collections of NGMA and its regional centers comprise around 17,000 art objects - paintings, drawings, sculptures, prints, photographs, and installations, essentially by Indian artists, built over the years through gifts, purchases, and permanent loans. It includes the works of about 2000 artists from India and abroad.

=== Collection of modern art before NGMA formation ===
The National Gallery of Modern Art began its systematic acquisition of modern arts by purchasing Amrita Sher-Gil's paintings. Among the 161 paintings handed over to the National Gallery of Modern Art, Sher-Gil and Tagore's paintings comprised more than half of the museum's collection. There are 33 paintings purchased by the government from Egan and 33 paintings donated by Sher-Gil's father, Umrao Singh. Umrao Singh offered this work to the government with a precondition that it should also buy the husband's work: “They serve along with her early works to show the development of her art and talent… But if her later works are not actually acquired by our nation, then what good will the old style work, which she herself did not value, be.” Nehru decided to solve the issue by promising Dr. Egan the requested amount of Rs. 50,000. The money was taken from the National Museum funds to acquire the Amrita Sher-Gil collection, which became the first step towards a state collection of modern art.

The year between 1950 and 1954 saw the acquisition of the same number of works by the artist Abanindranath Tagore. Abdur Rahman Chughtai was represented by ten paintings and Jamini Roy and Nandalal Bose by eight paintings each. In 1953, in addition to Amrita's works, a collection of 66 paintings, sketches and drawings by Abanindranath Tagore were offered to the government for purchase. Pratima Tagore, Abanindranath's sister, offered her collection of 66 works of her brother to the government for Rs. 30,000. The paintings were stored at the Central Asian Antiquities Museum and shown occasionally at UNESCO meetings at the Parliament House. The National Gallery of Modern Art finally opened at the Jaipur House, on 29 March 1954, under the administration of the government and with an inaugural ceremony by Dr. Humayun Kabir, the then secretary of the Ministry of Education.

=== Paintings ===
The strength of the NGMA collection is its representation of the evolution of modern Indian art. The gallery has paintings by artists including Thomas Daniell, Raja Ravi Verma, Abanindranath Tagore, Rabindranath Tagore, Rajkumar Sangwan, Nandalal Bose, Jamini Roy, Amrita Sher-Gil, Upendra Maharathi and various other artists.

The earliest are the indigenous schools of great Indian Miniatures: the vibrant Company, Kalighat and Tanjore schools of paintings. Academic Realists, Raja Ravi Varma, and those trained in the British art schools like M. F. Pithawala, Pestonjee Bomonjee, Hemen Majumdar amongst others contribute to a substantial presence. The next important phase of modern Indian artist, the Bengal School which countered the values of academic realists, is strongly represented by Abanindranath Tagore and his followers M. A. R Chughtai, Kshitindra Majumdar and others. The Santiniketan movement explored new aesthetic dimensions in its celebration of the environment, and its masters are Nandalal Bose, Ramkinkar Baij and Benode Behari Mukherjee. Even as the Santineketan artists flourished, four individual and original articulations of modernism emerged in the mid 1920s and 1930s. They are Rabindranath Tagore, Gaganendranath Tagore, Amrita Sher-Gil and Jamini Roy. The NGMA has major collections of these artists oeuvre. 1940s onward saw the emergence of different artists groups in major cities. The Progressive Artists Group in Mumbai with M. F. Husain, F. N. Souza, K. H. Ara, S. H. Raza, the Calcutta group with Gopal Ghose, Paritosh Sen and Prodosh Das Gupta were significant in livening up the art scene of the period. Following the spirit of group activity, K. C. S. Paniker along with S. G. Vasudev, Paris Viswanathan and K. Ramanujan set up the idyllic artists' commune in Cholamandal, near Chennai.

The art of the 1950s and 1960s saw the rise of Indian abstract art and a pendulum swing between international modernism and traditional roots. The new artistic expressions are represented in the NGMA collection in the works of Biren De, G. R. Santosh, V. S. Gaitonde, Tyeb Mehta, Satish Gujral, Akbar Padamsee, N. S. Bendre, K. K. Hebbar, Sailoz Mookherjea, Krishen Khanna and Ram Kumar. The NGMA also has some of the best works of K. G. Subramanyan, J. Swaminathan, A. Ramachandran and others. There is also a representative collection of artists who explored expressionism, surrealism, fantasies as well as pop art, during the 1960s and 1970s. Among other noted artists Ganesh Pyne, Bhupen Khakhar, G. M. Sheikh, Prabhakar Barwe, Arpita Singh, Rameshwar Broota, Jogen Chowdhury, Bikash Bhattacharjee, Nalini Malani, Vivan Sundaram, Paramjeet Singh, etc. are part of the collection. Contemporaries like Jitish Kallat, Jayashree Chakravarty, Atul Dodiya, Anju Dodiya, Chittrovanu Mazumdar, Subodh Gupta, Pushpamala N. and Riyas Komu are also represented.

Printmaking has been a strong current in modern Indian art. The museum has a collection of graphic prints of artists such as Jyoti Bhatt, Somnath Hore, Krishna Reddy, Anupam Sud, and Laxma Goud.

=== Sculpture ===
Artist Neeraj Gupta's Sculpture Makrana Marble, at National Gallery of Modern Art, New Delhi, on 24 May 2026

The NGMA has a collection of modern sculptures by sculptors like D. P. Roy Choudhury, Chintamoni Kar and Ramkinkar Baij. The NGMA holds a rich and varied collection of works of the major sculptors of the country with D. P. Roy Chowdhury, Ramkinkar Baij, Pradosh Das Gupta, Shankoo Chaudhuri, Meera Mukherjee, Amarnath Sehgal, Piloo Pochkhanwala, A. Davierwalla, Mahendra Pandya, Nagji Patel, Balbir Kat, Latika Kat, P. V. Jankiram, Nandgopal, and later contemporaries like Himmat Shah, Madan Lal, Mrinalini Mukherjee, Sudarshan Shetty, Subodh Gupta, Prithpal Singh Ladi, and Karlo Antao amongst other eminent sculptors, tracking the developments in the plastic arts. Painters, who have made significant contributions in sculpture, have been collected by NGMA like K. G. Subramanyan and Satish Gujral, amongst others.

=== Photography ===
The NGMA has a large collection of photographs by Lala Deen Dayal, one of the pioneers of photography in India. The NGMA began collecting photographs as an art form during the late 1970s. The collection is small, yet distinguished. Raja Deen Dayal's photographs of the regal life of early 20th century Hyderabad are treasure. So are the photographs of contemporary India by Raghu Rai, and modern cinema by Nemai Ghosh and Dayanita Singh.

The collection also includes sculptures, graphics and paintings by international modern artists such as Jacob Epstein, Giorgio de Chirico, Sonia Delaunay, Antoni Tàpies, Robert Rauschenberg, Se Duk Lee, D. C. Daja, Peter Lubarda, Kozo Mio, George Keyt and Fred Thieler.

== Gallery ==
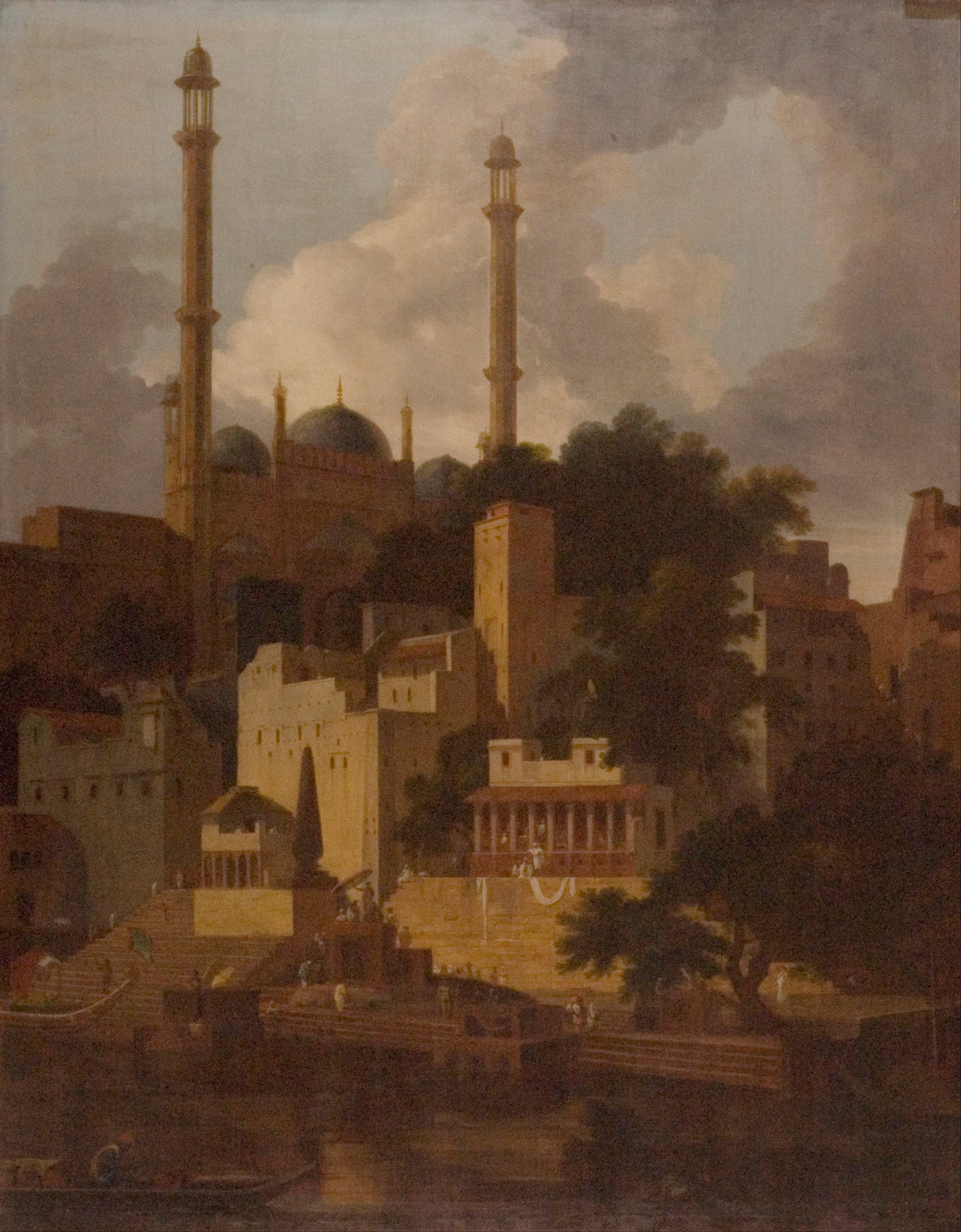
Aurangzeb's Mosque by Thomas Daniell

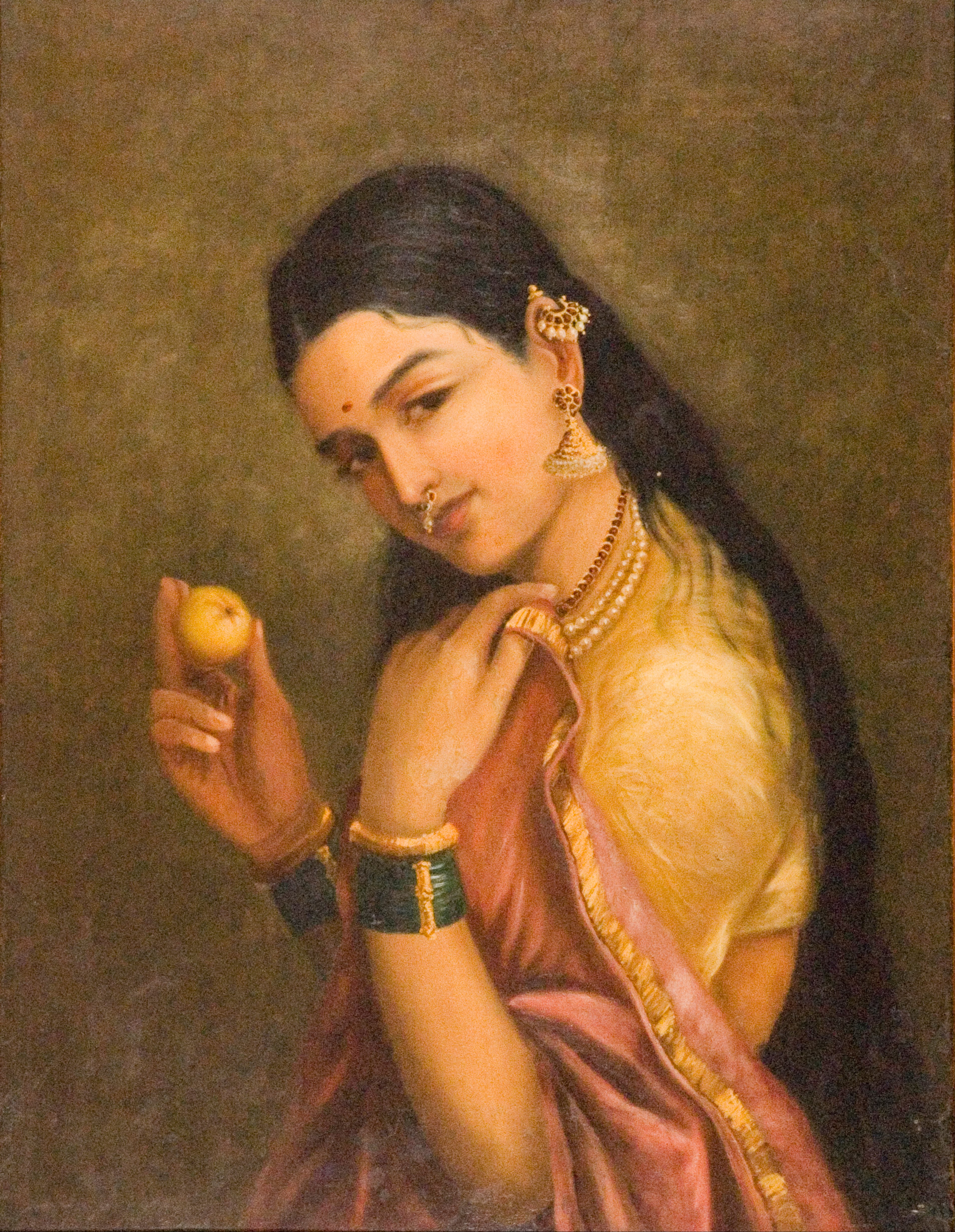
Woman Holding a Fruit by Raja Ravi Varma

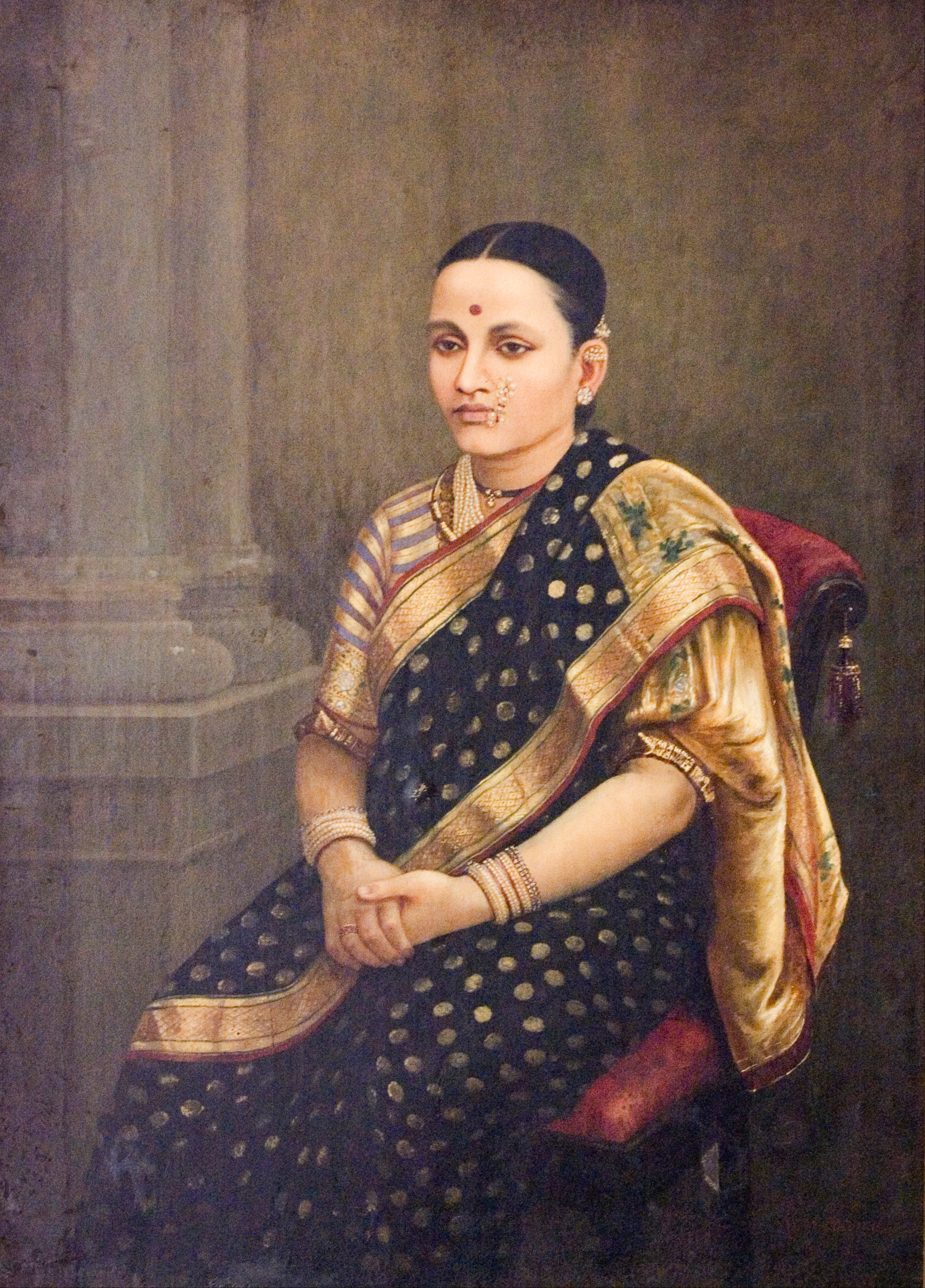
Portrait of a Lady by Raja Ravi Varma

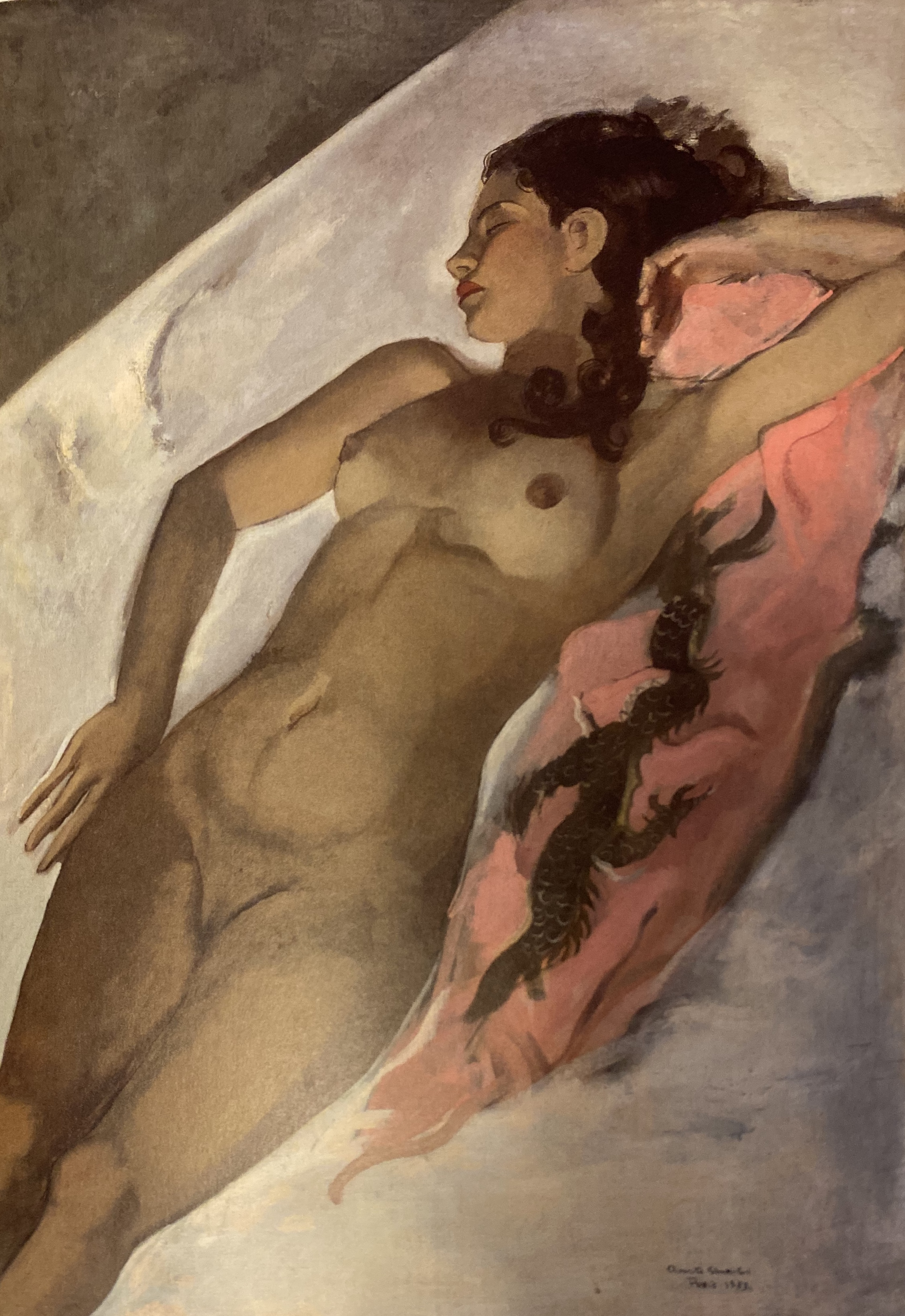
Sleep, 1933, Amrita Sher-Gil

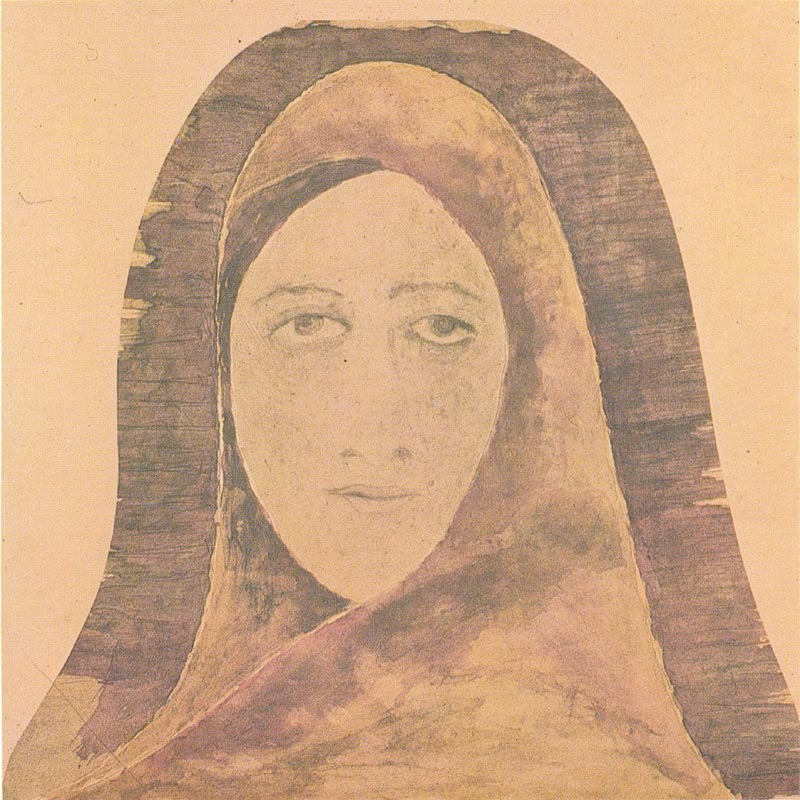
Face of a woman, by Rabindranath Tagore

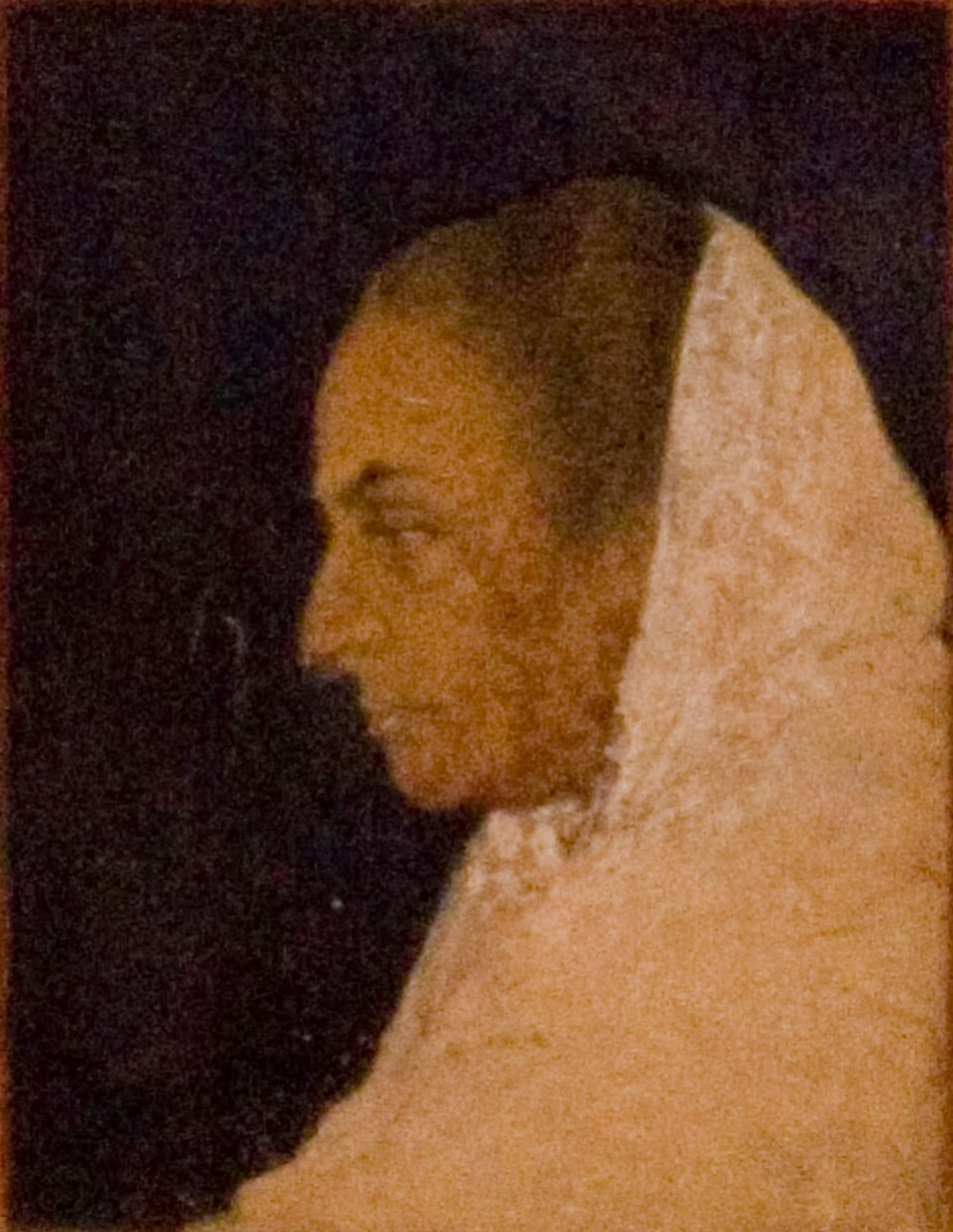
My Mother by Abanindranath Tagore

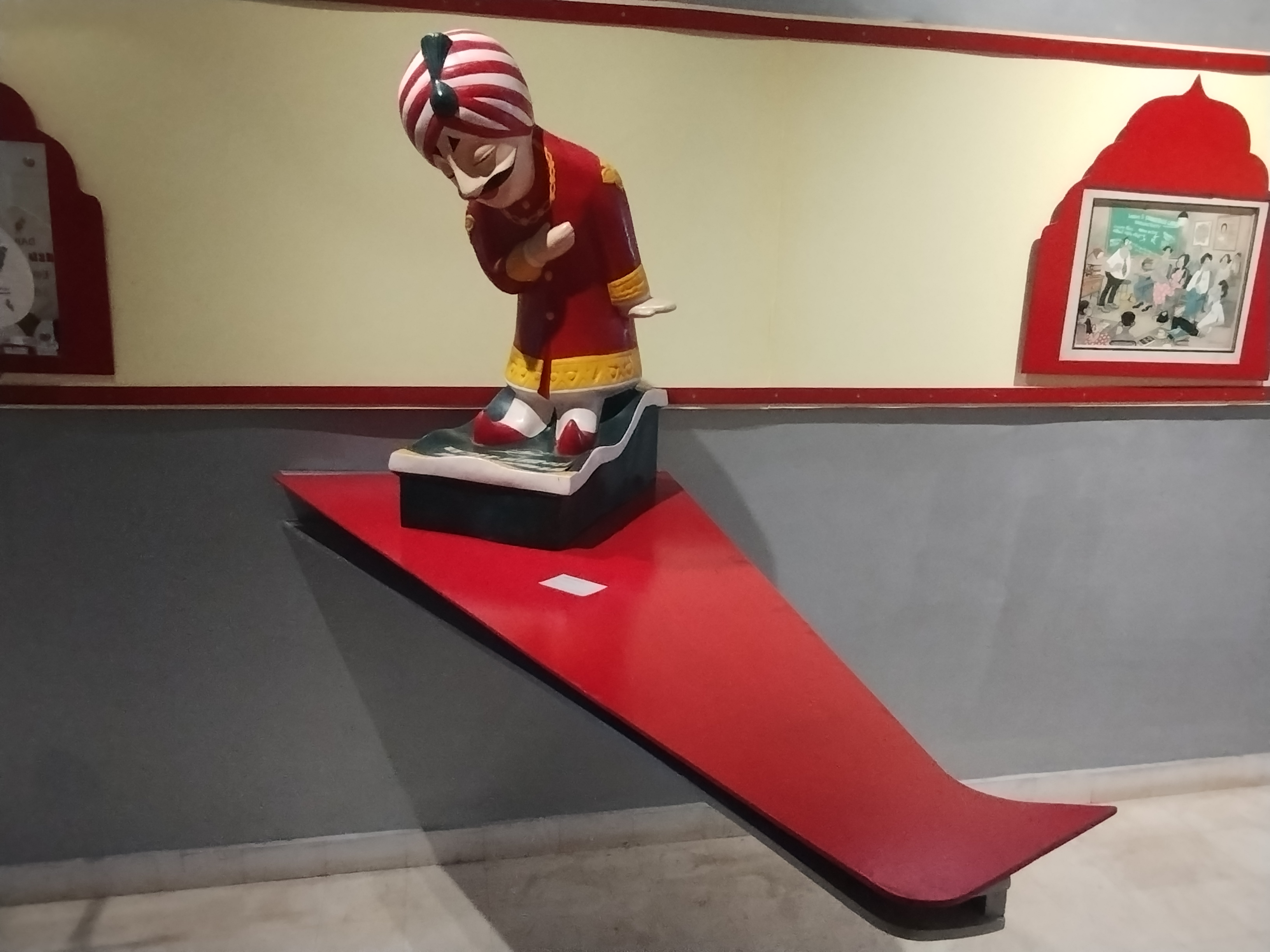
National Gallery of Modern Art, Bangalore (2025)

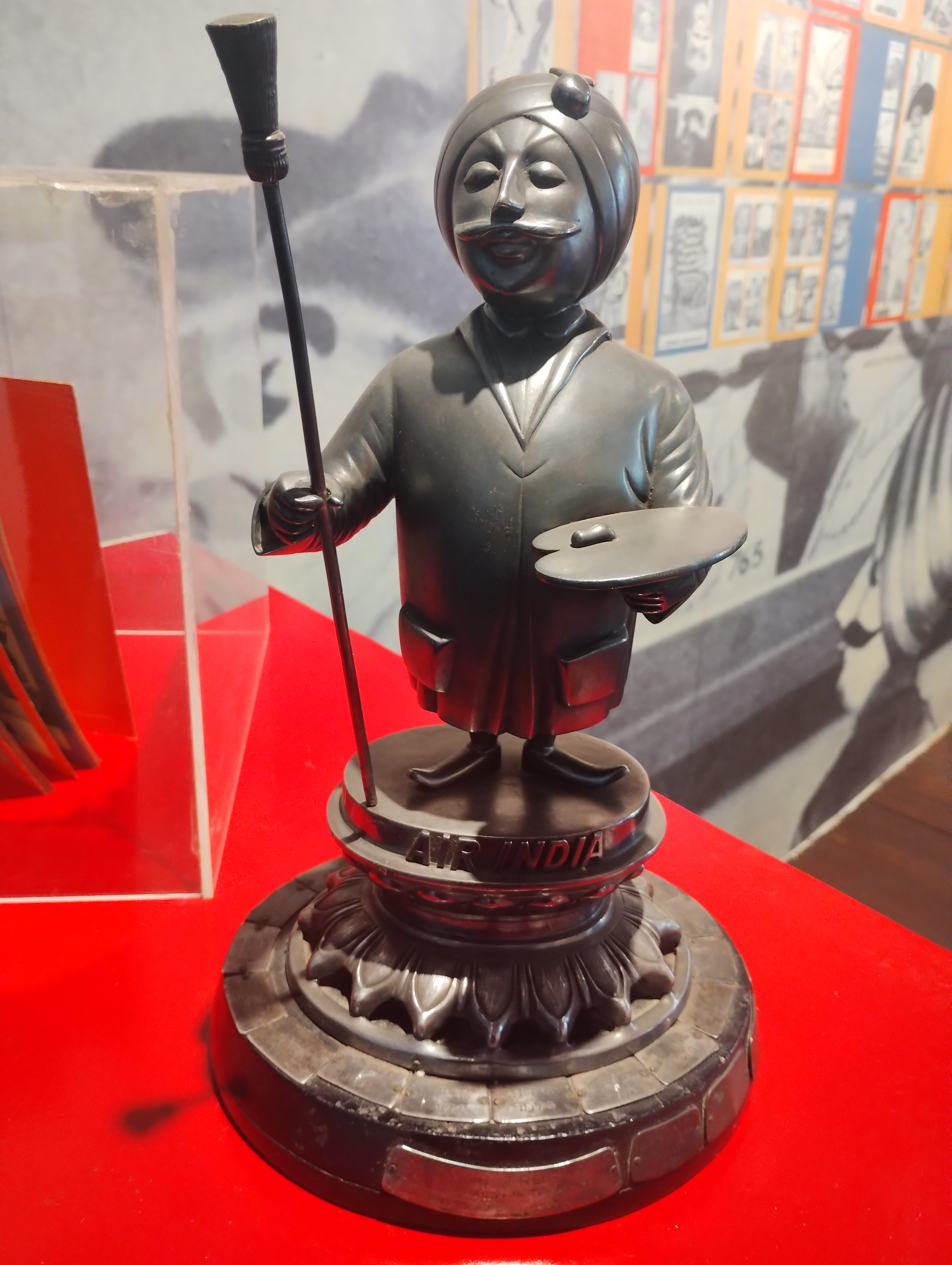
National Gallery of Modern Art, Bangalore (2025)
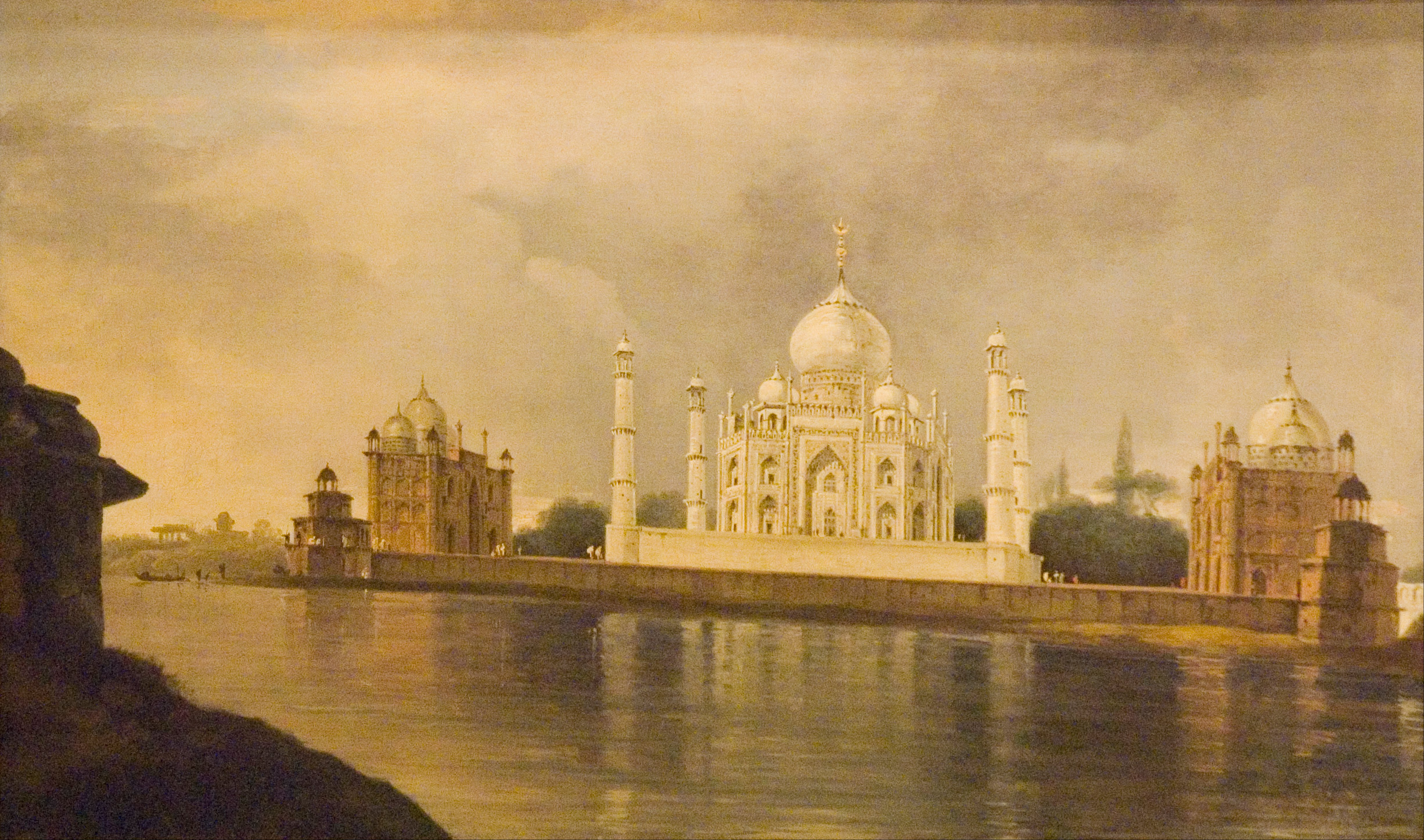
The Taj Mahal by William Hodges

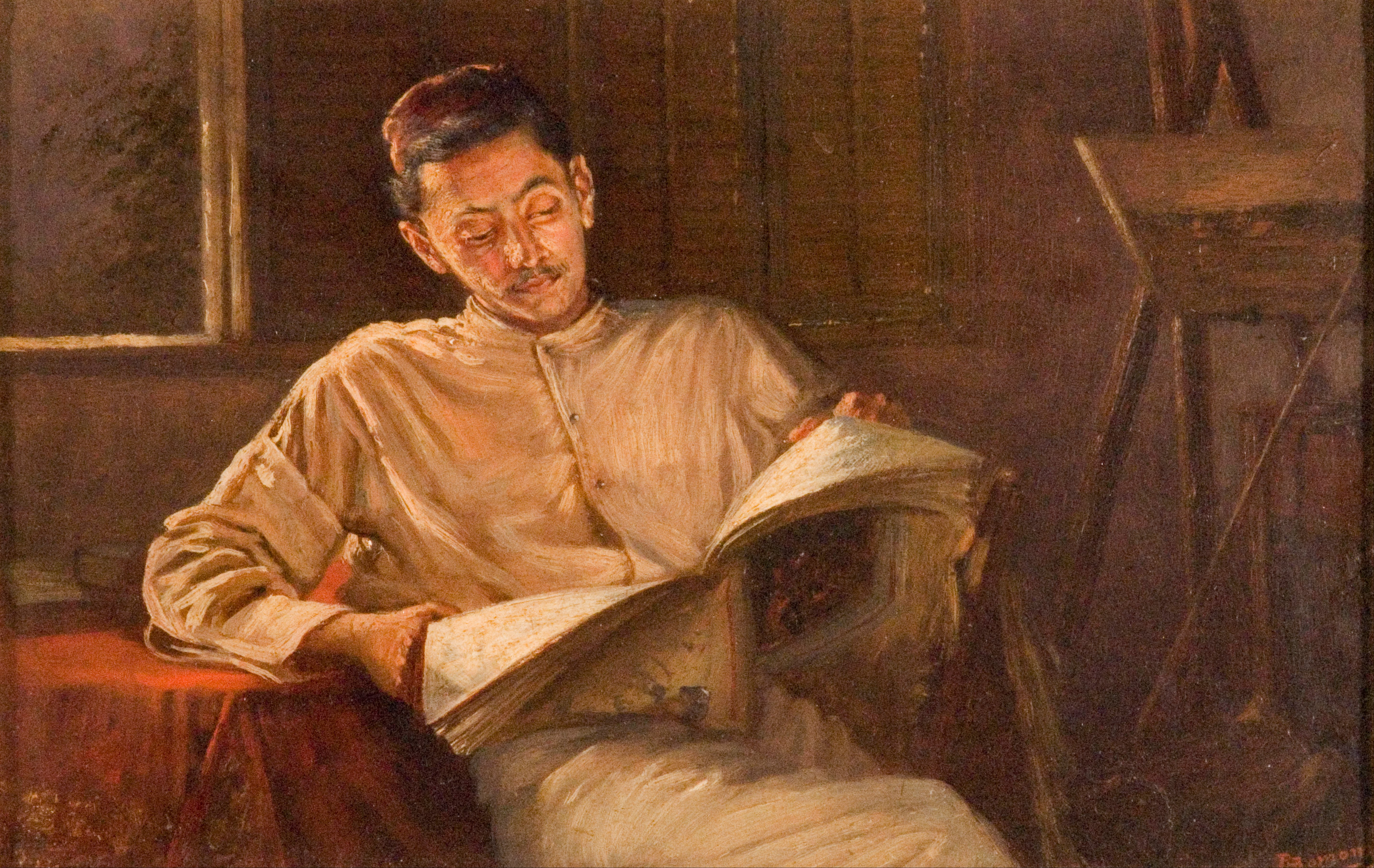
At Rest by Pestonji Bomanjee

== History of exhibitions ==
- "Shashwat Maharathi"- The Eternal Seeker from 17 September 2019 at National Gallery of Modern Art, Jaipur House, New Delhi
- "One Shiny Day" at National Gallery of Modern Art, New Delhi. From 14 August 2019 to 28 October 2019.
- "Astitva" - The Essence of Prabhakar Barwe at National Gallery of Modern Art, New Delhi from 13 June to 28 July 2019.
- "Dandi Yatra" at National Gallery of Modern Art, New Delhi. From 29 December 2018 to 30 June 2019.
- "Roopantar" : Showcasing the rarely seen treasures from the Reserve collection at National Gallery of Modern Art, New Delhi. From 2 November 2018 to 14 May 2019.
- "CHEHRE: Re-oriented Permanent Wing showcasing the rarely seen treasures from the Reserve collection" at National Gallery of Modern Art, New Delhi. From 8 October 2018
- 157th Birth Anniversary of Rabindranath Tagore "Gurudev" at National Gallery of Modern Art, New Delhi. From 7 May to 4 September 2018.
- "Indigenous Australia" from the National Gallery of Australia at National Gallery of Modern Art, New Delhi from 15 June 2018.
- "Naimisa Summer Art Program 2018" at National Gallery of Modern Art, New Delhi.
- "To The End of Land" - Contemporary Art from Israel From 28 April 2018, The National Gallery of Modern Art, New Delhi.
- "Eminent Printmakers of India" as part of First Print Biennial India 2018 at National Gallery of Modern Art, New Delhi. From 27 March to 22 April 2018.
- "Songs of the Uncaged Birds" at National Gallery of Modern Art, New Delhi. Inaugurated on 8 March 2018.
- "ANZAC Centenary Print Portfolio" at National Gallery of Modern Art, New Delhi. Inaugurated on 11 March 2018
- "Codici...Codici a Tratti...Fonte" at National Gallery of Modern Art, New Delhi, Opened on 15 March 2018.
- "Dhvani Se Shabd Aur Chinh", National Gallery of Modern Art, Ministry of Culture, Government of India, inaugurated on Monday, 16 October 2017.
- "Opera Omnia" : Digital Exhibition on Raffaello at National Gallery of Modern Art, New Delhi. From 8 February to 4 March 2018.
- "Amrita Sher-Gil - Story of First Indian Woman Modernist" at National Gallery of Modern Art, New Delhi. On display till 11 March 2018.
- Centenary Year Celebration of Dhanraj Bhagat "Journey from The Physical to The Spiritual" at National Gallery of Modern Art, New Delhi. From 20 December 2017 to 28 February 2018.

=== Exhibition list of NGMA from 1985 ===
- "Graphics of the 70’s Federal Republic of Germany" at National Gallery of Modern Art, New Delhi, 1985.
- "Henry Moore: Sculptures, Drawings & Graphics" at National Gallery of Modern Art, New Delhi, from 1 October to 15 November 1987.
- "Indian Women Sculptors in Celebration of International Women's Day" at National Gallery of Modern Art, New Delhi from 2 to 29 March 1987.
- "Thresholds: Contemporary French Art" at National Gallery of Modern Art, New Delhi, 1995.
- "The Self and the world An Exhibition of Indian Women Artists" at National Gallery of Modern Art, New Delhi from 5 to 30 April 1997.
- "Indian Contemporary Art, from the Collection of the National Gallery of Modern Art, New Delhi." at National Art Gallery, Colombo, from 10 to 20 August 1998.
- "India a Celebration of Independence 1947 to 1997", Exhibition of photographs from the Philadelphia Museum of Art at NGMA, New Delhi from 26 March to 26 April 1998.
- "Contemporary Art from Korea" at National Gallery of Modern Art, New Delhi 1999.
- "Dialogue – Interactions in Indian Art" Part One, From 1850 onwards at National Gallery of Modern Art, New Delhi from 14 July 2001 to 31 December 2001.
- "Pictorial Transformations" (Treasures from the collection of the National Gallery of Modern Art) National Gallery of Modern Art, New Delhi 8 to 19 January 2003.
  - Kuala Lumpur, Malaysia 5 December 2003 to 4 January 2004.
- "Ikuo Hirayama Exhibition Cultural Exchange of East and West" from 28 February to 9 March 2003 at National Gallery of Modern Art, New Delhi, 2003.
- "Satyajit Ray: From Script to screen A suite of photographs by Nemai Ghosh" at National Gallery of Modern Art, New Delhi, 2003.
- "Contemporary oil Paintings from China" Organized by National Gallery of Modern Art, New Delhi, under the cultural Exchange Programme 17 February to 7 March 2004.
- "Visual Trajectories - Art From India" IZIKO South African at National Gallery, Cape Town: 26 April to 4 June 2006.
- "Vanishing Points" at National Gallery of Modern Art, New Delhi from 12 October to 11 November 2007.
- "Scratches on the Face Antiquity and contemporaneity in South African works of art from lziko" Museums of Cape Town from 8 to 30 December 2008.
- "A long Tale with Many Knots Fluxus in Germany 1962 to 1994" from 16 May to 4 June 2008.
- "Rhythms of India : The Art of Nandalal Bose (1882 to 1966)" From the Collection of National Gallery of Modern Art, New Delhi.
  - San Diego Museum of Modern Art, San Diego from 23 February to 18 May 2009 Philadelphia Museum of Art,
  - Philadelphia, USA from 26 June 2008 to 31 August 2008.
  - National Gallery of Modern Art, New Delhi from 19 January 2009.
- "In the Dawn of Modernity in India:Company Paintings From the collection of National Gallery of Modern Art", New Delhi from 12 to 29 March 2009.
- "Anish Kapoor" at National Gallery of Modern Art, New Delhi, from 27 November 2010 to 27 February 2011.
- "Homai Vyarawalla A Retrospective" Curated by Sabeena Gadihoke at National Gallery of Modern Art, New Delhi, from 27 Aug to 31 Oct 2010.
- "Nicholas Roerich An Eternal Quest" at National Gallery of Modern Art, New Delhi from 13 March 2010 to 11 April 2010.
- "Bhutan – An Eye to History" at National Gallery of Modern Art, New Delhi, from 24 December 2009 to 31 January 2010.
- "In the seeds of time" at National Gallery of Modern Art, New Delhi from 19 January 2009.

== See also ==
- List of national galleries
- National Gallery of Modern Art, Mumbai
- National Gallery of Modern Art, Bangalore
- The Last Harvest : Paintings of Rabindranath Tagore
- Kolkata Museum of Modern Art
