= Bülbül =

Bülbül ([bylbyl], literally "nightingale") is a Turkish and Azerbaijani feminine given name and surname. Notable people with the name include:

== Given name ==
- Bülbül Hatun (died 1515), wife of Sultan Bayezid II

== Surname ==
- Azer Bülbül (1967–2012), Azerbaijani folk singer and actor
- Kerem Bülbül (born 1995), German footballer of Turkish origin
- Samet Bülbül (born 1991), Turkish footballer

== See also ==
- Bulbul (disambiguation)
