= Bulbul (disambiguation) =

Bulbul is a family of songbirds. It may also refer to:

== Given name ==
- Bulbul (singer) (1897–1961), Azerbaijani singer and Soviet opera tenor, born as Murtuza Mammadov
- Bulbul Ahmed (1940–2010), Bangladeshi actor and director
- Bulbul Chakraborty, Indian physicist
- Bulbul Chowdhury (1919–1954), Bengali dancer
- Bulbul Chowdhury (writer) (1947–2021), Bangladeshi novelist and writer
- Bulbul Hussain (born 1972), British wheelchair rugby player
- Bulbul Kartanbay (born 1993), Kazakh ice hockey player
- Bulbul Mahalanobish (1953–2023), Bangladeshi singer
- Bulbul Shah (died 1327), Uyghur Sufi
- Bulbul Sharma (born 1952), Indian painter and writer

== Surname ==
- Ahmed Imtiaz Bulbul (1956–2019), Bangladeshi lyricist, composer and music director
- Aminul Islam Bulbul (born 1968), Bangladeshi cricketer
- Zózimo Bulbul (1937–2013), Brazilian actor, film director and activist

== Places ==
- Bulbul, Syria, a town
- Bülbül, Yeşilli

== Films ==
- Bulbul (2013 film), a Kannada film directed by M. D. Shridhar
- Bulbul (2019 film), a Nepalese film directed by Binod Paudel
- Bulbbul, 2020 Indian horror film

== Other ==
- Cyclone Bulbul
- Bulbul tarang, Punjabi string instrument
- Very Severe Cyclonic Storm Bulbul (2019)
