= Upendra Maharathi =

Indian artist (1908–1981)

- Born: 1908
- Died: 1981 (aged 72–73)
- Citizenship: India
- Education: Government College of Art & Craft
- Occupations: Painter, sculptor, illustrator, architect, and graphic and textile designer
- Spouse: Padma Shri

Upendra Maharathi was an Indian artist who worked in various mediums including painting, sculpture, illustration, architecture, graphic design, and textile design. He was born in the village of Narendrapur in Odisha and received his art education at the Government College of Art & Craft in Kolkata under Mukul Dey and Percy Brown. After completing his studies, he settled in Bihar. His more than 900 works have been preserved by the National Gallery of Modern Art, Delhi.

== Life and career ==
Born in 1908 in Narendrapur, a small village in Odisha, Upendra joined the Government College of Art and Craft in 1925. He was exposed to a variety of Western and indigenous techniques of art, craft and architecture at the school. His artistic style was shaped by the nationalist movement in Bengal, which supported Swadeshi values and recognized the resistive, anti-colonial potential of art. Led by E. B. Havell and Abanindranath Tagore, the movement encouraged students to revive traditional forms of Indian art. His art was also influenced by Gandhi's non-violent politics.

Maharathi created a diverse body of work that explored themes such as spiritualism, nationalism and self-discovery. He lived as a recluse, wandering around pilgrimage sites like Bodh Gaya, Rajagriha and Vaishali and was known for substituting his canvas with various mediums such as cloth, wood, clay, and bronze.

As an architect, his notable artworks include the Vishwa Shanti Stupa in Rajgir, Japan's Gotemba Peace Pagoda, the Mahabodhi Temple in Bodh Gaya, Nava Nalanda Mahavihara in Nalanda, Vaishali Museum and Gandhi Mandap in Bodh Gaya.

Upendra Maharathi was also known for his innovative use of enamel paint on wood, a technique inspired by the Japanese style. He applied the tikuli style of art to practical and decorative objects such as coasters, trays and wall decorations. His work reflects the influence of Mithila (Madhubani) painting on contemporary tikuli art.

In 1940, he designed the Ramgarh Congress Nagar Complex, which included the "Glories of India" series and initiated a new movement in folk art. He was also an active participant in India's independence movement and was influenced by the ideologies of Mahatma Gandhi. He abandoned the opportunity of an educational tour to Paris in response to Gandhi's call for promoting Swadeshi.

Later, as a special designer in the Department of Industries in the government of Bihar, Maharathi worked to bring together art, craft, and design. Upendra worked to revive the centuries-old tradition of handloom weaving in Bihar. He established an institute in Patna for this purpose in 1956, which was later the state government renamed it the Upendra Maharathi Shilp Anusandhan Sansthan in his honor after his death. He was awarded the Padma Shri, one of the highest civilian honours by the Government of India in 1969 for his contributions to revitalizing traditional and native arts and handlooms. He died in 1981.
