= Baroda Museum & Picture Gallery =

Art museum in Gujarat, India

Coordinates: 22.3118°N 73.1888°E

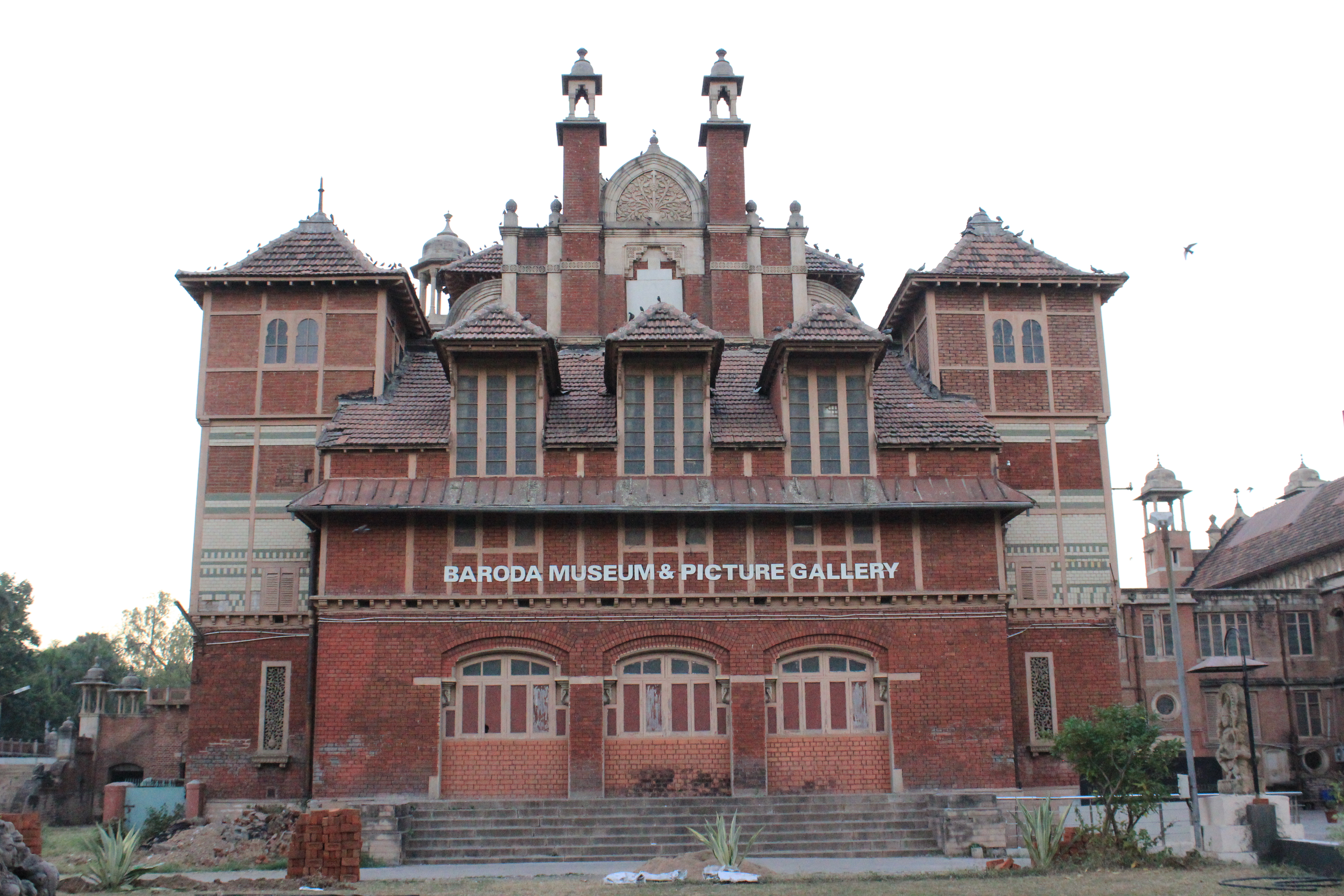
- Front view of the museum
- Established: 1894; 132 years ago
- Location: Kamatibaug, Dak Bunglaw, Sayajiganj, Vadodara, Gujarat – 390020
- Type: Art museum
- Founder: Sayajirao Gaekwad III
- Architect: Robert Chisholm
- Website: barodamuseum.gujarat.gov.in

The Baroda Museum & Picture Gallery is an archeological and natural history museum in Baroda (Vadodara), Gujarat, India. It was built in 1894, modelled after the Victoria & Albert Museum and the Science Museum in London.

== History ==
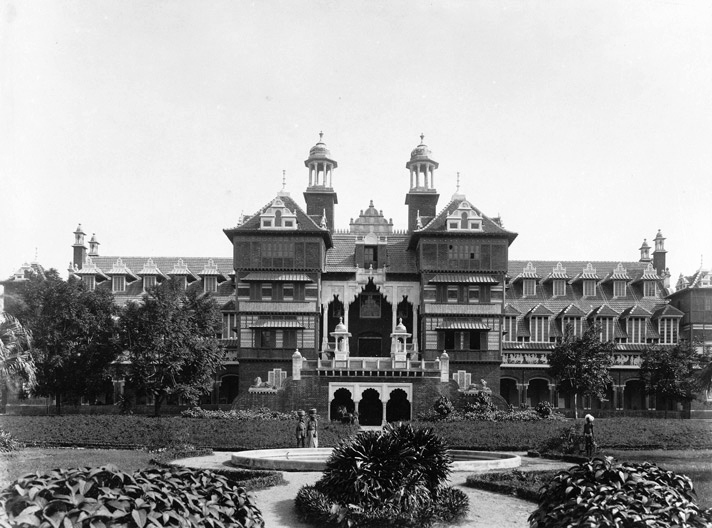
The museum during the British rule in India (c. 1890)

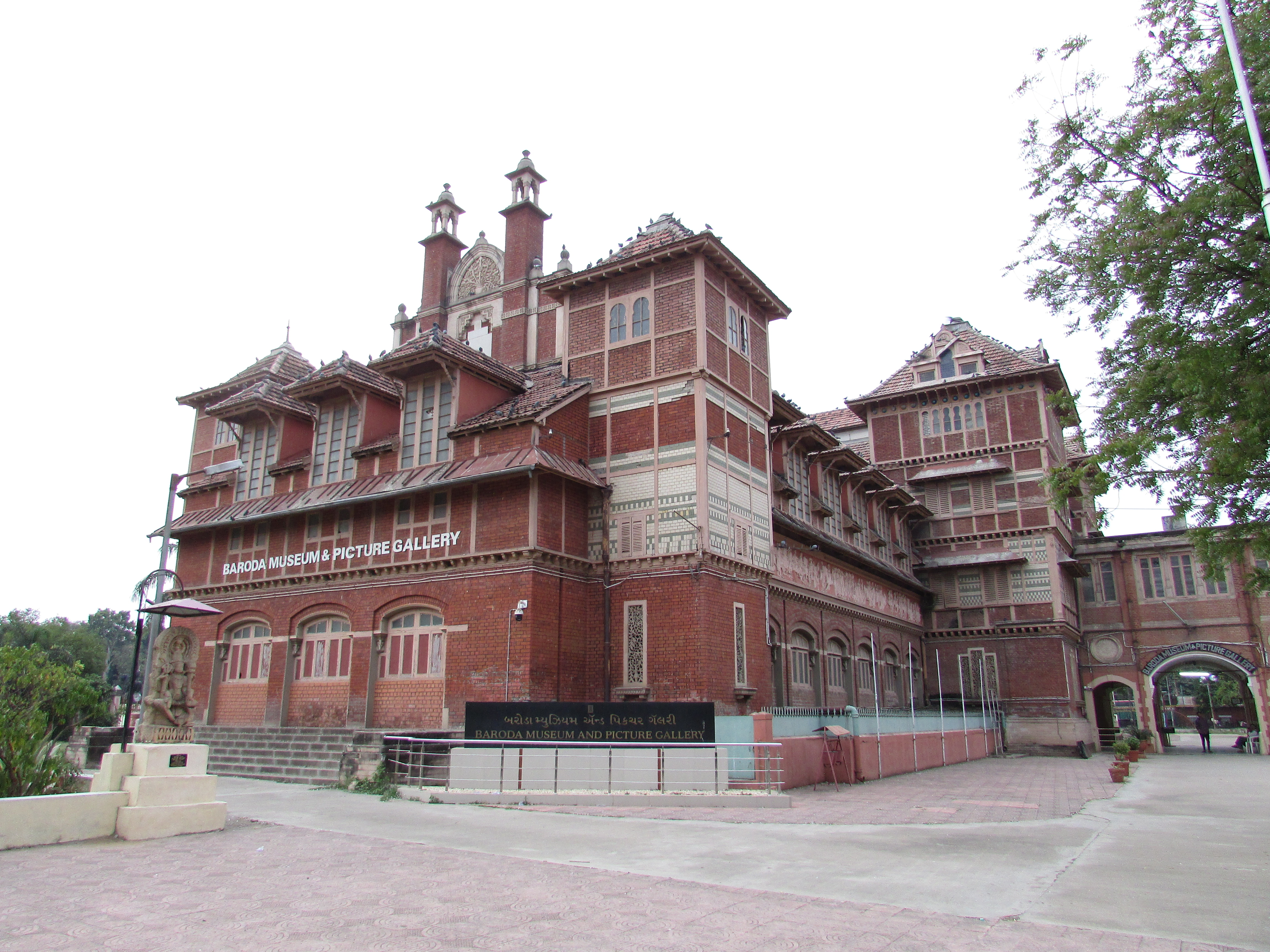
Baroda Museum and picture gallery building

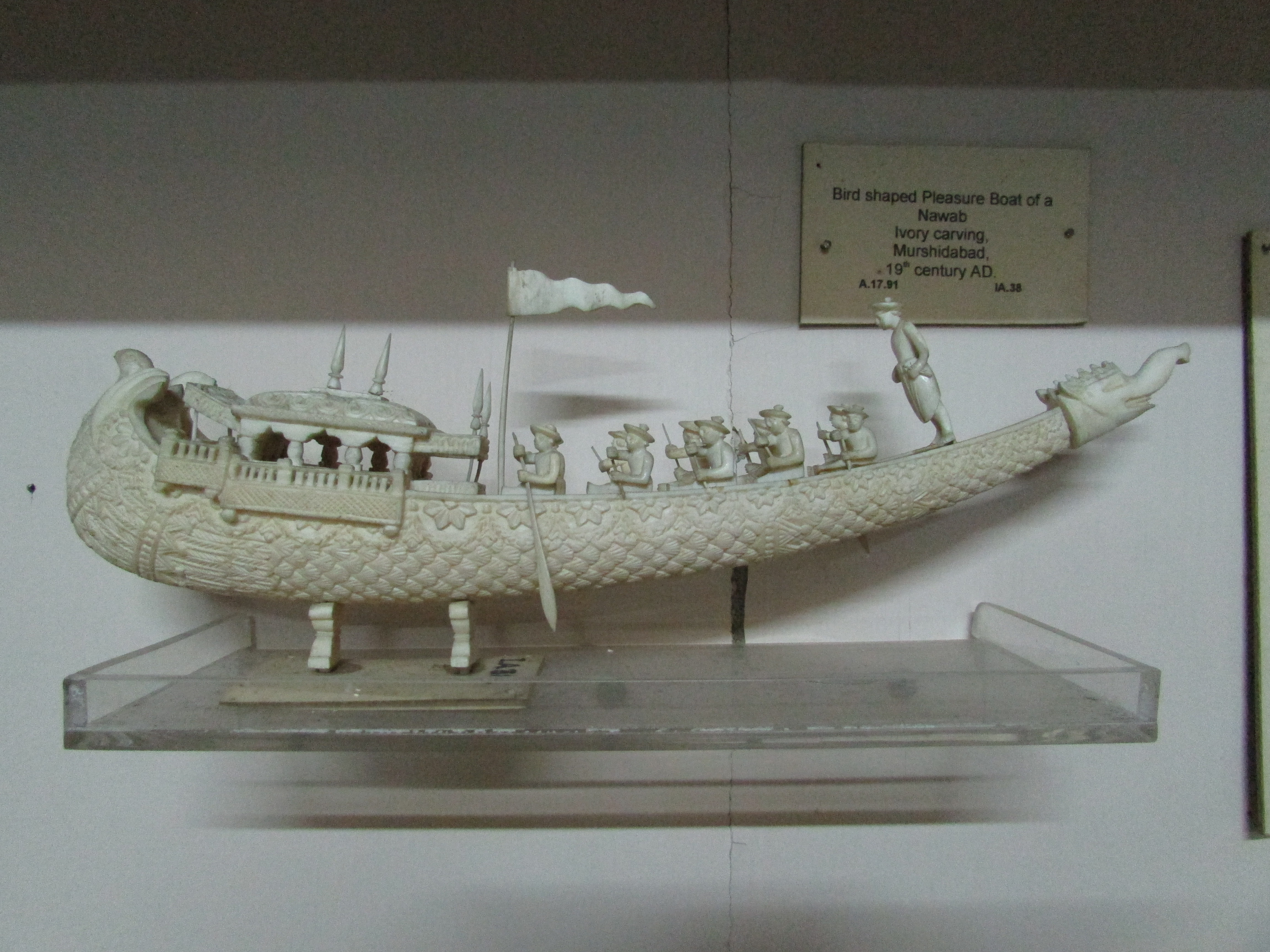
Ivory boat from Murshidabad, 19th century

The museum is located in Kamatibaug, Dak Bunglaw, Sayajiganj, Vadodara, Gujarat. It was established during the reign of the Gaekwad dynasty of Baroda State. Major Mant, in association with R. F. Chisholm, who refined some of Mant's designs into examples of Indo-Saracenic architecture, designed the building. The museum complex covers 113 acres.

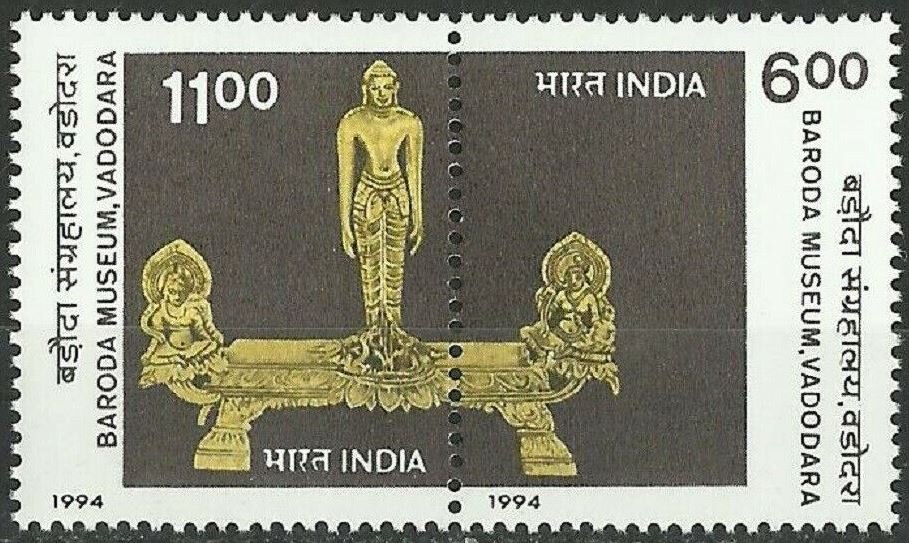
The museum in a 1994 postage stamp of India

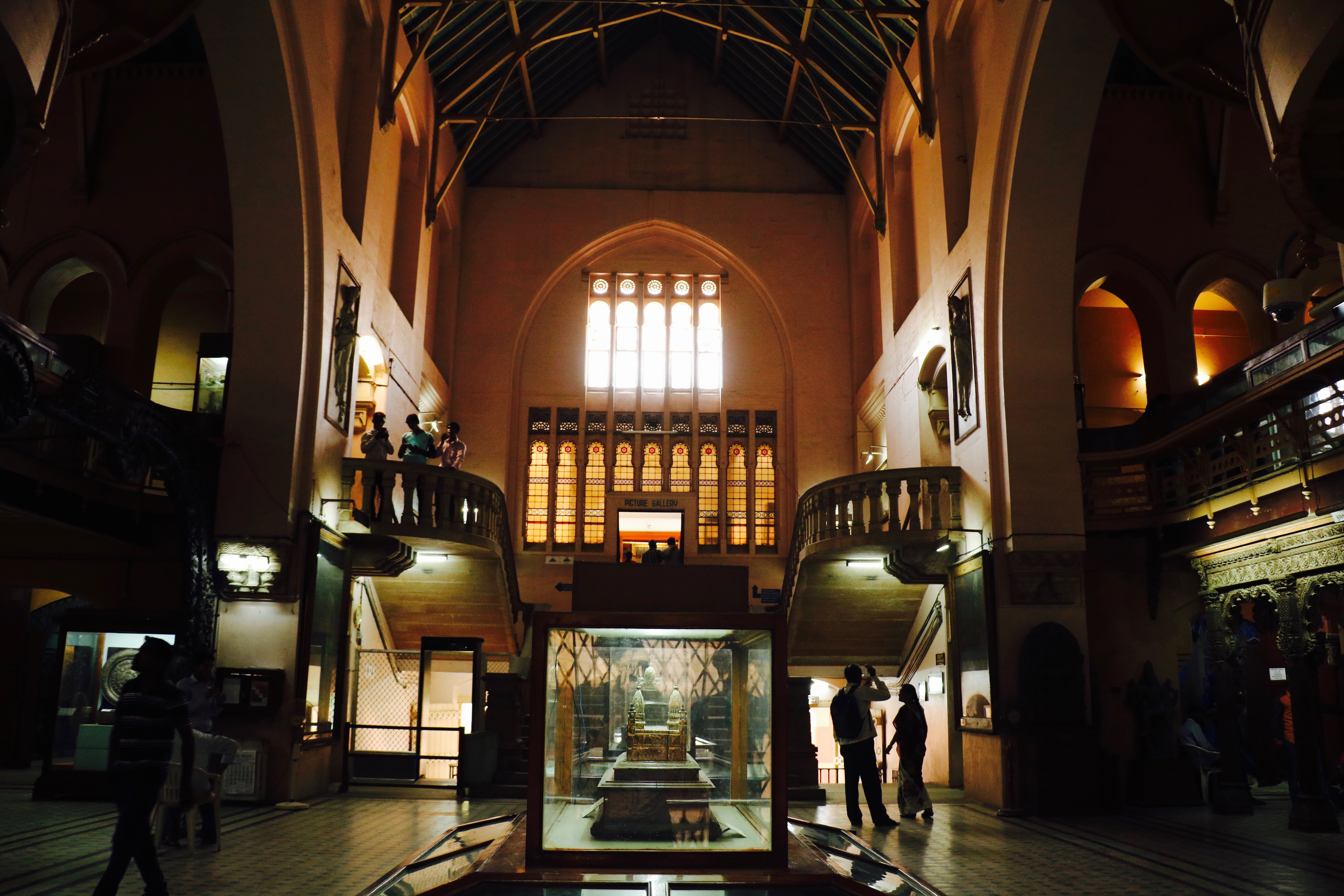
Interior of the museum

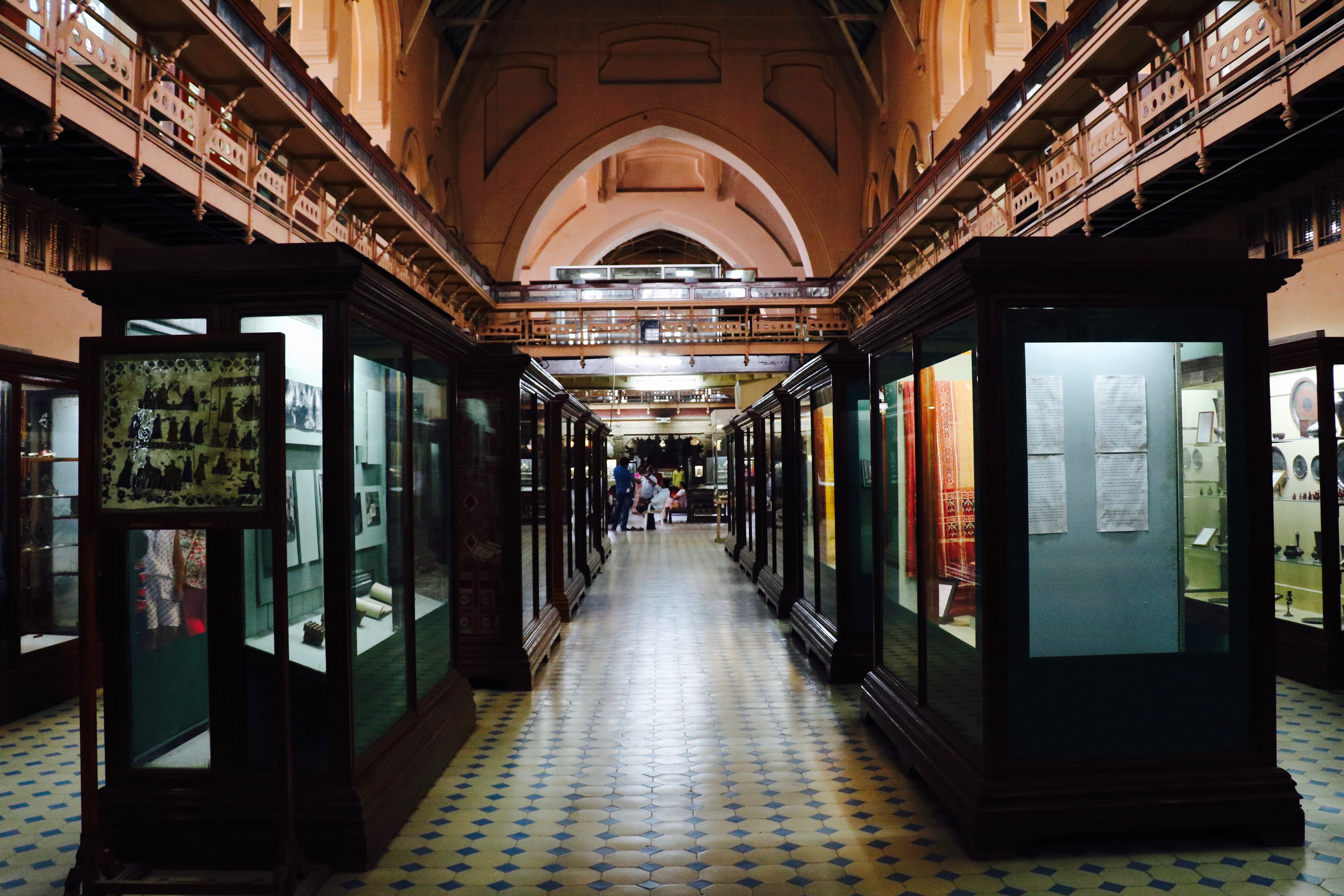
Museum gallery

Maharaja Sayajirao Gaekwad III who belonged to the Gaekwad dynasty of the Marathas, founded the museum in 1887. The museum building was completed in 1894, when it opened to the public. Construction of the art gallery commenced in 1908 and was completed in 1914, but did not open until 1921 as the First World War delayed transfer of pieces from Europe intended for the gallery. The Picture Gallery building was added to the museum in 1910.

== Collection ==
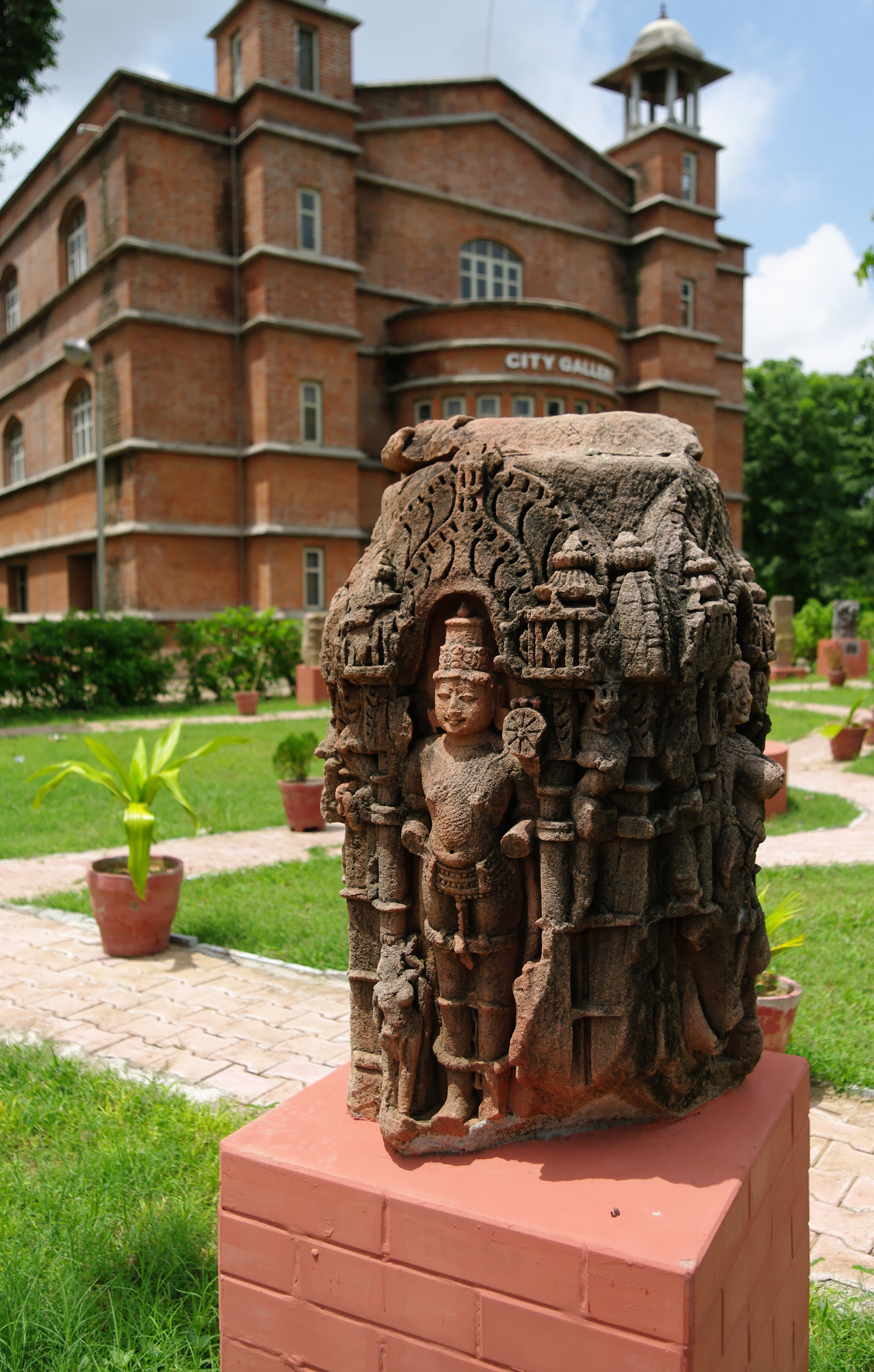
Archaeological garden

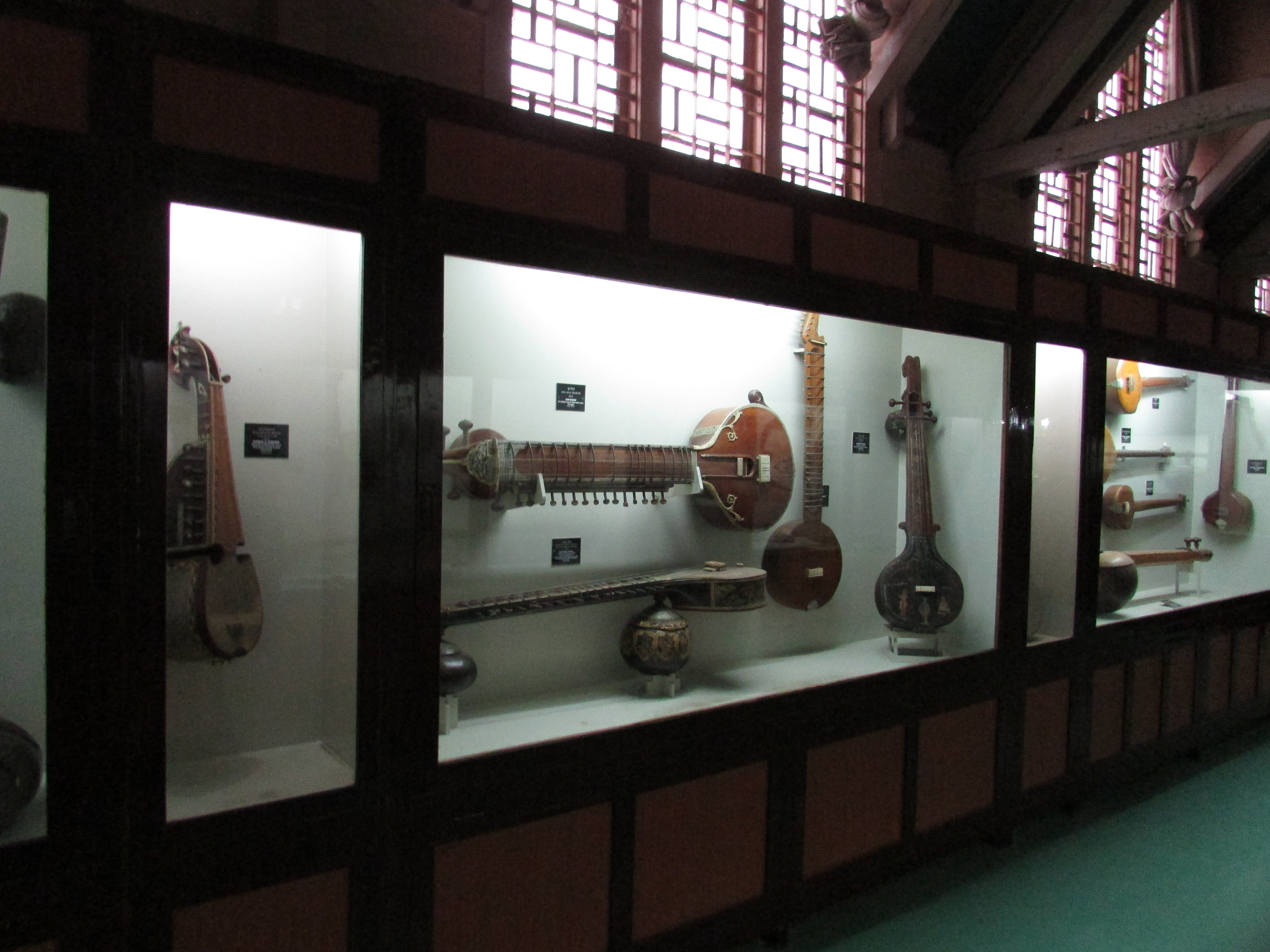
Musical instruments

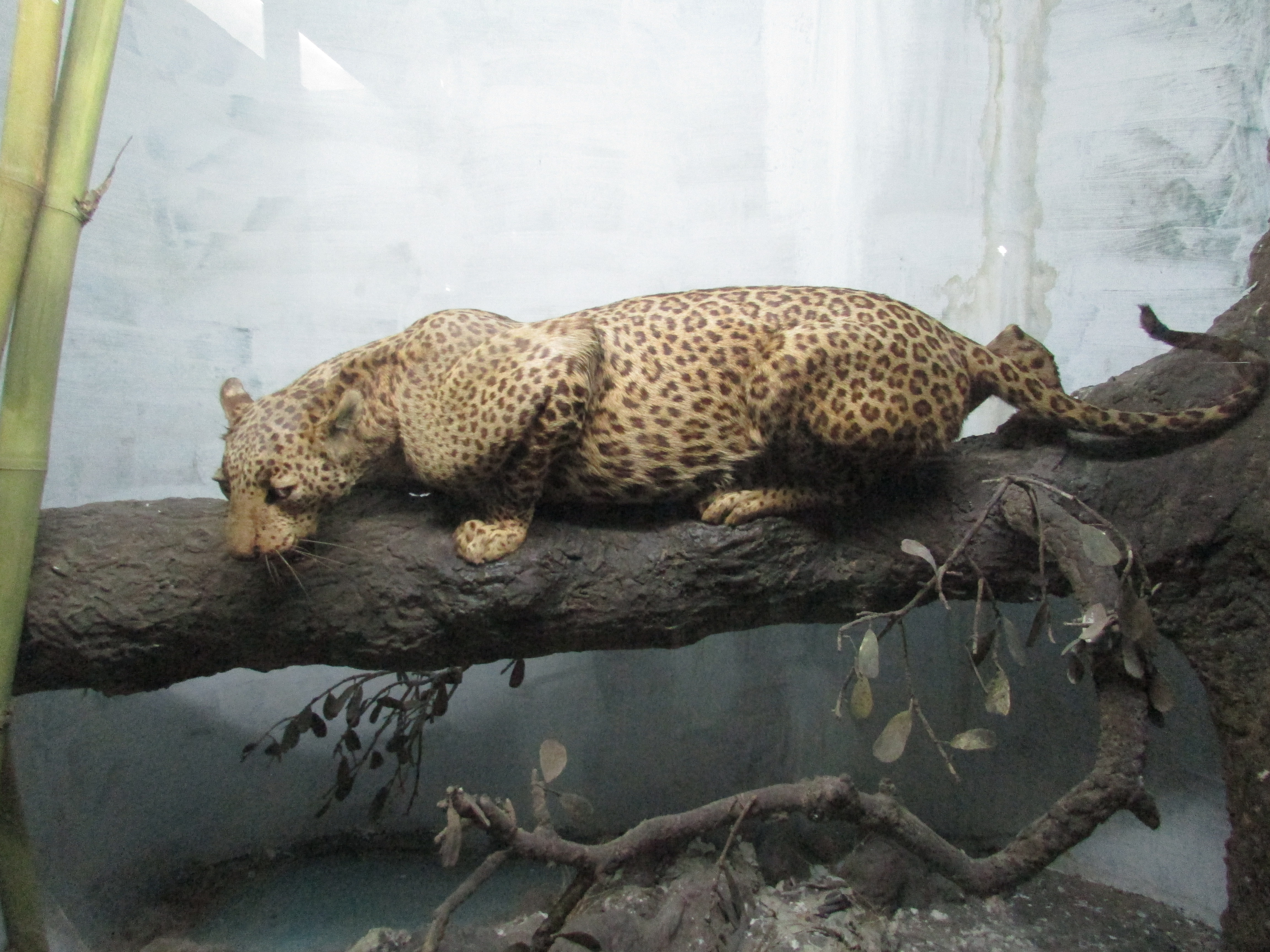
Stuffed leopard

The collection holds a rich collection of art, sculpture, ethnography and ethnology. The picture gallery offers a collection of originals by famous British painters J. M. W. Turner and John Constable and many others. The Egyptian mummy and skeleton of a baby blue whale are major attractions. Other treasures include the famous Akota Bronzes dating to the fifth century, a collection of Mughal miniatures, a full-fledged gallery of Tibetan art, Indian handicrafts, artefacts and coins.

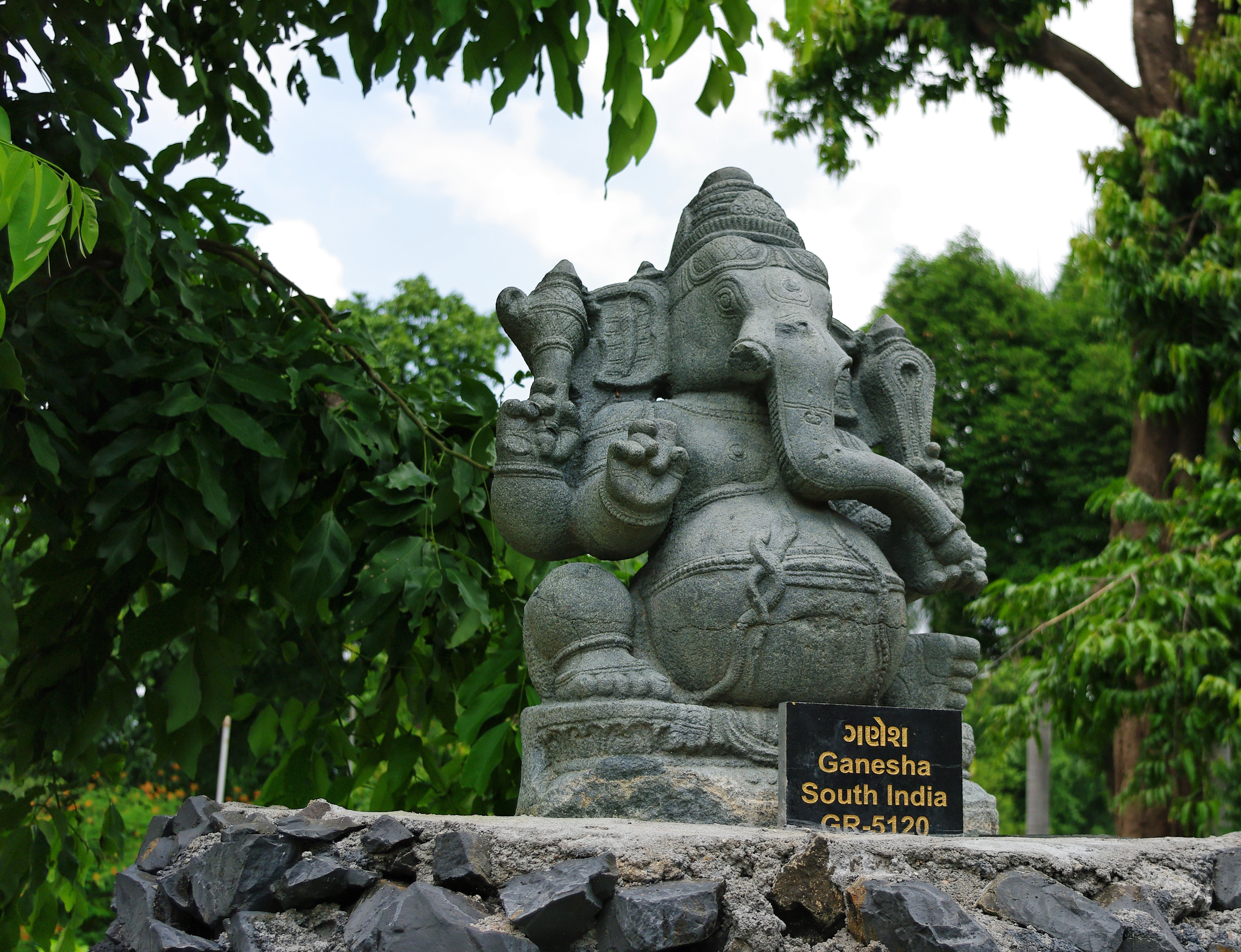
Statue of Lord Ganesha

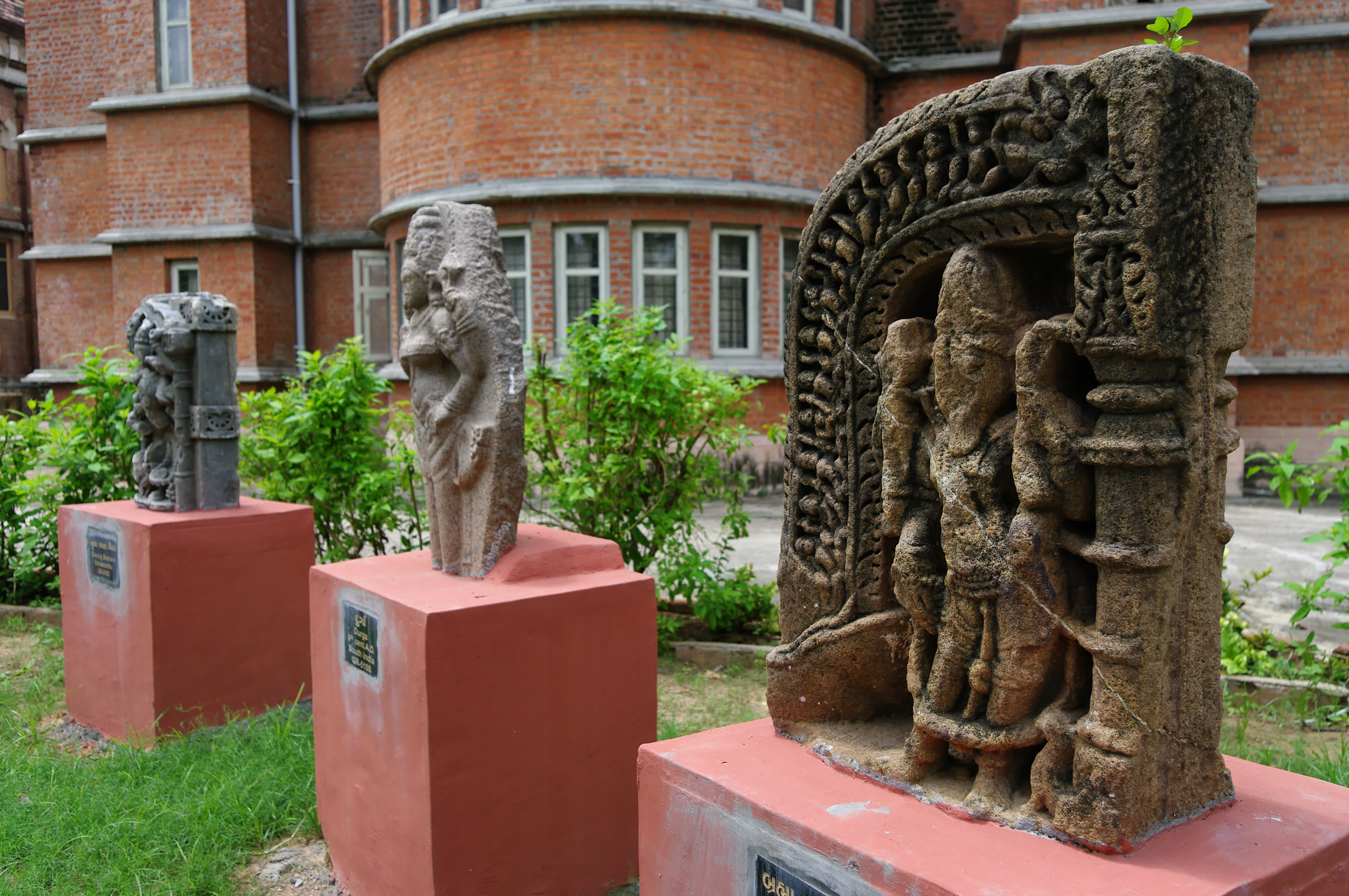
Objects in the open air gallery

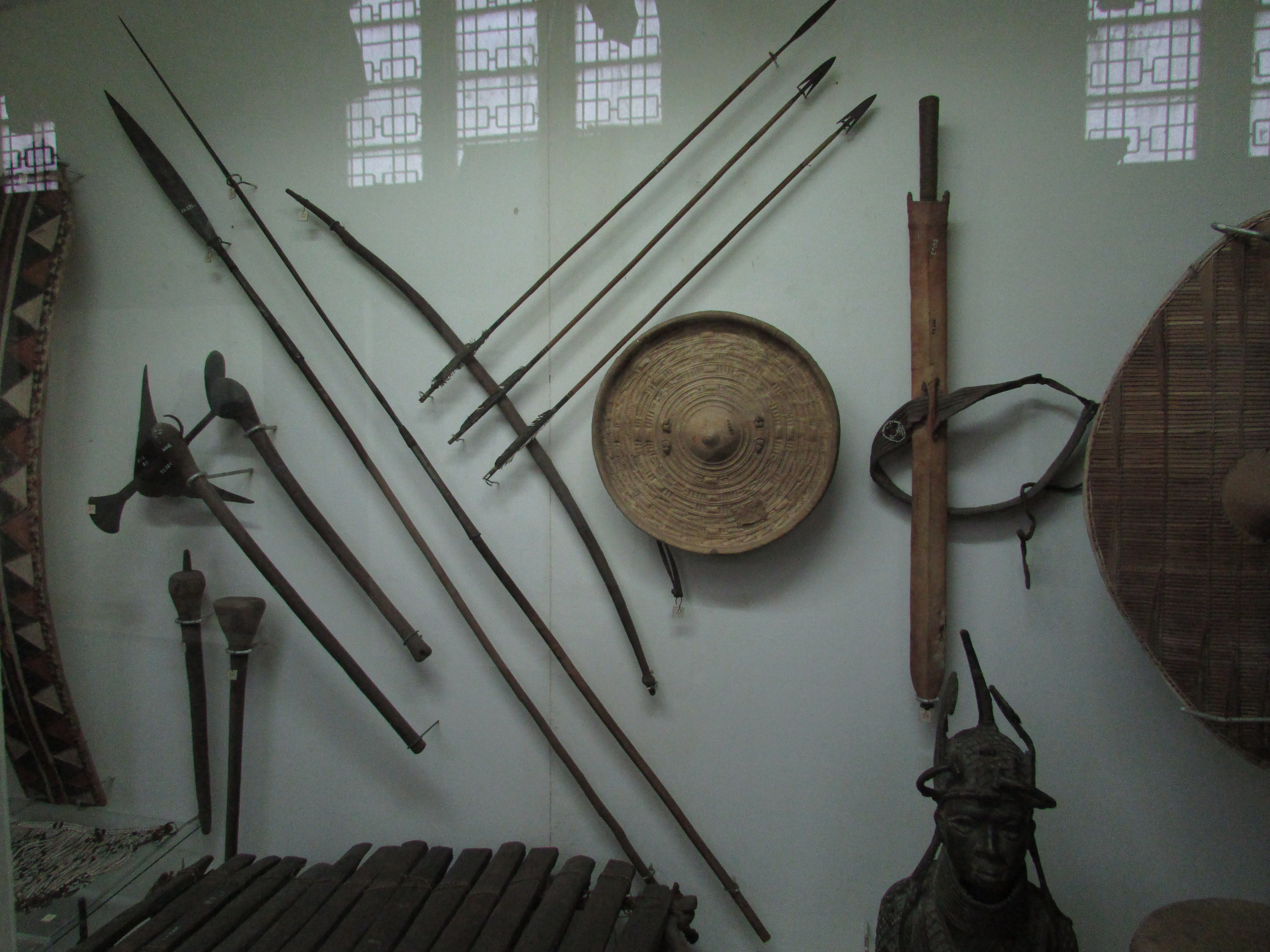
Antique weapons

== Timings ==
The museum is open from 10:30 am till 5:00 pm except for government holidays.

== See also ==
- Akota Bronzes
- List of museums in India
