= Bilbija =

Bilbija is a Serb surname, derived from bilbil, the Slavic variant of the Turkish word bülbül meaning "nightingale". Notable people with the surname include:

- Filip Bilbija (born 2000), German footballer
- Nemanja Bilbija (born 1990), Bosnian footballer, son of Milorad
- Nenad Bilbija (born 1984), Slovene handball player
- Milorad Bilbija (born 1964), retired Bosnian footballer, father of Nemanja
