= Bulbul Sharma =

Indian painter and writer (born 1952)

- Born: Bulbul Sharma; 14 October 1952 (age 73); New Delhi, India
- Citizenship: Indian
- Occupations: Painter and writer

Bulbul Sharma (born 14 October 1952) is an Indian painter and writer currently based in New Delhi. At present, she is working on a collection of short stories for neo-literate children.

== Biography ==
Sharma was born in New Delhi and spent most of her childhood days in the steel town of Bhilai, Madhya Pradesh. Sharma finished her graduation in Russian Language and Literature from Jawaharlal Nehru University, New Delhi in 1972. Thereafter she went to Moscow State University for higher education.

Upon her return to India in 1973, she pursued a career in painting. She joined Gawri, an artist complex in New Delhi. It was only in 1985 that she took to writing full-time. She held several exhibitions of her paintings in India and abroad and her paintings are in the collection of National Gallery of Modern Art, Lalit Kala Akademi, Chandigarh Museum., UNICEF NORAD, National Institute of Health, Washington, The Nehru Centre, London.

She started writing weekly columns in Statesman and editing children's books for various publishers.

Her stories have been translated into French, Italian, German and Finnish. Her other passions include bird-watching and teaching art to disabled children.

"Learn everything you can, anytime you can, from anyone you can, there will always come a time when you will be grateful you did", quoted Sharma at a school in Gurgaon which is also a philosophy she lives by. Her writing style is simple and based on her observations, and the places she travels. Pointing out the beauty in ordinary things, she makes her books vivid. She goes into the cycle of seasons and the changes it brings.

== Books ==
Sharma has conducted art and story telling workshops for special children for over the last 15 years. She started with collections of short stories and then progressed towards novels and books for children

=== Short stories ===
- My Sainted Aunts (1992)
- The Perfect Woman (1994)
- Anger of Aubergines (1997)

=== Novels ===
- Banana-Flower Dreams (1999)
- Shaya Tales (2006)
- Eating Women Telling Tales (2009) – In this book, Sharma explores the many roles—some perennial, some unexpected—that food can play in women’s lives.
- The book of Devi (2011)
- Tailor of Giripul (2011)
- Grey Hornbills at Dusk
- Now that I am Fifty
- Travels with my Aunts
- Murder in Shimla (2020)

=== Children's books ===
- Manu Mixes Clay and Sunshine (2005)
- Fabled Book of Gods and Demons
- The Children’s Ramayana
- The Book of Indian Birds for Children
