= Laxmi Prasad Sihare =

Indian Administrative Service Officer

- Born: 7 November 1929; India
- Died: 1993 (aged 63–64); India
- Occupations: Civil service officer, curator, art writer
- Known for: art writings, museum administration
- Awards: 1987 Padma Bhushan

Laxmi Prasad Sihare was an Indian civil service officer, curator, art writer and the director-general of the National Gallery of Modern Art (NGMA). It was during his directorship, an art exhibition on Auguste Rodin was organized by the museum.

Sihare joined NGMA as the director-general in 1984. One of his main contributions was his timely intervention in stopping the 1995 public auction of the Jewels of the Nizams, which included the Jacob Diamond, an uncut diamond ranked fifth in the world in size. He obtained a court order in 1979 and stopped the auction of the jewels to buyers which included bidders from abroad. He published a number of books and monographs, including Oriental influences on Wassily Kandinsky and Piet Mondrian : 1909-1917, Paul Klee : sixty oil paintings, water colours, pastels and drawings (1909-1939), Restoration of oil painting : techniques and Computer art. The Government of India awarded him the Padma Bhushan, the third highest civilian award, in 1987.

Sihare retired from government service in 1991 and died in 1993.

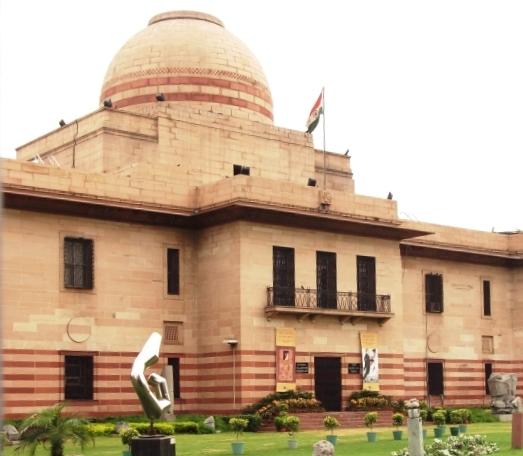
National Gallery of Modern Art

== See also ==
- Nizam of Hyderabad
- Jaipur House
