= Jayashree Chakravarty =

Jayashree Chakravarty is a Kolkata based Indian visual artist, working with painted canvases, and large-scale installations of paper with mixed media.

== Early life and education ==
Jayashree Chakravarty was born in Khoai, Tripura and spent her childhood in Agartala, where she was first introduced to art. Her subjects of interest which have remained close to studies of nature came from her experiences of living in a small town. She studied at Kala Bhavan, Santiniketan (1973–78) where she drew from the works of masters such as Nandalal Bose and Benodebihari Mukherjee, building a more nuanced vocabulary of her early interest in nature. Exposed to the cosmopolitanism of her immediate environment, surrounded by students and scholars from all over the world, Chakravarty was able to trace several similarities between Agartala and Santiniketan in terms of the ways in which small towns at the time were morphing into more urban spaces.

During the early 1980s, Jayashree moved to Vadodara, Gujarat and joined M.S. University for a PG Diploma in Painting. This change brought influences to her practice from post-Independence narrative art, especially as Vadodara became almost a transitional location between Agartala, Santiniketan, and Provence, France where the artist attended a two-year artist-residence programme between 1993-1995.

She later moved to Kolkata in 1982 to live in the Salt Lake area, and is currently still living there.

== Work ==
Jayashree’s practice grew exponentially during the entire 1970s, ‘80s and the early ‘90s, ranging from her early education to the more formative period of studying at art institutions. Encountering her work gives one the impression of an artist focused on the landscape but she ensures a layered complexity that evokes elements of the locale as well as a more expansive understanding of the landscape itself. Accumulating influences from her time in Agartala, Santiniketan, and Vadodara, her studies of the figure in relation to space became more acute than before.

Vadodara brought her closer to references from post-World War II American abstract art as well as Indian artists incorporating languages of abstraction into their explorations of landscape. Jayashree integrated the landscapes of her childhood, the different spaces she encountered at various points in her life, and her experiments with the figure at these different junctures. Her understanding of the landscape as a site, rooted in the memories she carried as well as those that were rapidly forming in her present, leaned towards delving into expressing her relationship with space, home and associated notions of loss, absorption and familiarity. In Provence, Jayashree began considering the material and the process of making as means towards furthering her expressions of space, and she experimented with techniques of layering and pasting in order to build statements around her work.

Known extensively for her canvases and paper works, Jayashree initiates her process of making by toying with the cartographic possibilities of splashes, drips, and splatters that form what could be representations of topography from her past. As Adip Dutta writes, “Then appear impressions of the palm, fingers, and feet along with repetitive dots, dashes, broken lines, blobs of colour, and so on.” Her work builds around a recognisable motif of chaos, where she assimilates different surfaces into one, laying them one on top of the other, weaving them in a manner that at the same time creates and destroys the multiple landscapes that emerge. As she draws deeply from her personal/emotional memory, her works display a continuous revisiting of familiar site(s), placing nostalgia together with socio-political issues of home, migration, ecology, and habitat.

Her work in the early 1990s feature anthropomorphic forms, indicating her influences from existing traditions in the subcontinent. Since the 1990s, Jayashree has toyed with a marriage of abstract grounds and the figurative, changing the appearance of her works and also further complicating the process of addressing the content and issues she usually foregrounds. The artist’s works between 2002 and 2004 position the human form amidst the characteristic lines, splashes of colour, dashes, dots, and floating words, and also layer it with films of various depth and texture. Jayashree’s shifts from small towns to larger cities have brought her involvement with notions of belonging to the canvas she prepares, tracing the forming and un-forming of boundaries across space and memory. As posited by several critics, the idea behind a lot of the construction that she inserts in her work is the presentation of consciousness as boundless and floating, coupled with an affective density that obfuscates readings of the work itself.

== Exhibitions ==
- If You Will Stay Close to Nature... at Vadehra Art Gallery, Delhi (2014)
- A Wired Ecology - a solo exhibition at Akar Prakar exhibition, Delhi (2019)
- Earth as Haven: Under the Canopy of Love - a solo exhibition at Chhatrapati Shivaji Maharaj museum, Mumbai (2018)
- Sightings: out of the wild - a solo exhibition at Kiran Nadar Museum of Art, Noida (2019)
- Unfoldings: The Route map of Experience at Kiran Nadar Museum of Art, Noida (2021)
- Feeling the Pulse (in the pandemic years) - a solo exhibition at Akar Prakar, New Delhi for Asia Week New York (2022)

== Awards and recognition ==
- First Indian artist to showcase at Paris’ Guimet Museum
- Listed among '10 Best Images from Indian Art in 2016', published at Times of India
