= Sonia Khurana =

Indian artist (born 1968)

- Born: 1968 (age 57–58); Delhi, India
- Education: Royal College of Art; College Of Art
- Known for: Multimedia

Sonia Khurana (born 1968, in Delhi, India) is an Indian artist. She works with lens-based media: photo, video, and the moving image, as well as performance, text, drawing, sound, music, voice, and installation.

== Career ==
Sonia Khurana studied art in London at the Royal College of Art, where she completed her Masters in 1999, and earlier in Delhi at the Delhi College of art. In 2002, Sonia did a two-year Residency Programme for practice-based research at the Rijksakademie VanBeeldende Kunsten in Amsterdam.

Sonia made her debut solo exhibition, consisting of moving image works, in Delhi, India, in the year 2000, after returning from the U.K. The exhibition, 'Lone women don't lie', is one of the early exhibitions of the moving image in the Indian context.

Her works have been shown in Europe during the exhibition elles@Centre Pompidou (2009/2010), in the United States during the Global Feminisms exhibition in Brooklyn (2007), in some of the biennale in Asia: the Aichi triennale [2010], the Busan biennale [2004], the Gwangju Biennale [2008], and in the seminal exhibition west heavens, in Shanghai [2010] among several others [ listed under group shows ].

Her single channel video Bird, produced in 1999 while she was at the Royal College of Arts in London placed her both within the feminist discourse, as well as among the emerging generation of artists working with digital media.

== Solo exhibitions ==
2014 January to March: Oneiric house, an off-site exhibition with the Kiran Nadar Museum of Art, New Delhi, at Outset India foundation in Jorbagh. Curator Roobina Karoda

2010 February: Solo exposition of recent videos at Studio Teresa Sapey, Madrid, Spain, in conjunction with ARCO Madrid.

2009 March–April: Living in the round – I Solo exposition the Max Muller Bhavan - Goethe institut, Delhi. Self curated. Co-curator Katja Kessing.

2007 June to August: Still moving image, recent digital and video works, Gallerie Jousse Enterprise, Paris. Self Curated, in cooperation with Gallerie enrico Navara.

2006 January to February: Many lives, recent videos at Apeejay Media Gallery, New Delhi. Self curated. Curatorial advisor Pooja Sood.

2000 September to October: Lone women don't lie first solo exposition of work in video and digital media. The Queen's Gallery, the British Council New Delhi, Simultaneously at the Goethe Institute, New Delhi. Self curated.

Group exhibitions:

2015 February: Progress and hyegine, Zacheta, National gallery of Modern art Warsaw. Poland [video installation and performance talk] Curator: Anda Rottenberg.

2014 December to 2015 January: The missing pavilion Jawaharlal, Nehru University, new Delhi. Curator Gayatri Sinha.

2014 December to 2015 January: My Memory, Your History: Narratives of the North, Birla Academy of Arts & Culture, Calcutta-India. Curator Priya Pall

2014 November to 2015 January: Ethereal, Leila Heller Gallery, New York curator Dr. Amin Jaffer

2014 November: Drawing 2014 - Seven Decades of Indian Drawing Gallery Espace, New Delhi Co-curator Annapurna Garimella, jackfruit Arts.

2014 November: The Yvonne Rainer Project. The choreography cinema, Jeu de Paume, Paris. Curator Chantal Pontbriand.

2013 January to November: Difficult loves : Seven Contemporaries, Kiran Nadar Museum of Art, New Delhi. Curator Roobina Karode.

2013 November to 2015 January: Aesthetic bind - Phantomata, Chemould Prescott Gallery, Bombay. Curator Dr Geeta Kapur.

2013 December to 2014 January: Mythopoetics: Re-picturing the feminine, 1st Kochi Biennale's collateral show. Travelled to Griffith university, Brisbane, Australia. Curator Marnie Dean.

2013 October to December: Take me elsewhere – vanity projects, New York. curator Diana Campbell

2012 June to September: How am I: exhibition, eight artists from India and Denmark, Kastrupgaard Samlingen, Copenhagen and LKA, New Delhi.

2011 December to 2012 January: Your name if different there exhibition curated by Nancy Adajania. Includes three other artists works. Volte Mumbai.

2011 May to September: Paris-Delhi-Bombay : at the Pompidou center, Paris. A survey show if Contemporary Indian art. Curators Fabrice Bousteau and Sophie Duplaix

2011 June to September: video: an art, a history, at the Singapore art Museum. A travelling exhibition from the collection of Centre Pompidou, Paris.

2009 May to 2011 February: Elles@Pompidou.center: a two-year-long, historical survey exhibition from the collection of Centre Pompidou, Paris.

2010 October to December: Place time play project: West heavens. Shanghai. Commissioned by Tsongzung Chang. Curator Chaitanya Sambrani.

2010 November: a tribute to Yvonne Rainer BFI, London. Curator Chantal Pontbriand.

2010 January to April: Where three dreams cross: photography from the Indian subcontinent, the Whitachapel art Gallery, London. Traveled to Fotomuseum Winturthur, Zurich. Curator Suni Gupta.

2008 December to 2009 February: India Moderna IVAM, Valencia and Billboards across the city. Curator Juan Guardiola.

2009 February: ARCO Madrid, video and public performance lying-down-on-the-ground.

2008 December: Where in the world, Devi Art Foundation, curated by the students of School of Art and Aesthetics, J.N.U., with Naman Ahuja and Kavita Singh.

2008 September: Gwangju Biennale, Korea, curated by Okwui Enwezor, with Ranjit Hoskote.

2008 August: Still Moving image inaugural exhibition of the Devi Art Foundation, Delhi

2008/2007 July, April: Les Rencontres Internationales Berlin, Madrid, Paris.

2008 March: Click - Contemporary Photography in India. Vadhera art gallery, New Delhi.

2008 February: A season of film at Axel Lapp Projects, Berlin

2007 March: Global Feminisms at the Brooklyn museum. Traveled to various venues for two years. Curators by Maura Riley and Linda Nochlin.

2007 November: New Delhi New Wave, Marella Gallery, Milan. Curator: Jerome Nuertes

2007 November:Carolee Schneeman and four women artists, at Elga Wimmer gallery New York (in conjunction with Performa 2007, New York).

2007 October: FIAC 2007, Paris (with gallery Jousse Enterprise)

2007 October: Tiger by the Tail Rose Museum, Brandies University, Boston. Curators: Wendy Tarlow Kaplan, Elinor Gadon, Roobina Karode.

2007 September: Global Feminism remix Davis Museum, Wellesley College, Boston

2007 September: Horn, Please Kunsthmueum Bern, Switzerland. Curators: Bernhardt Fibicher, Suman Gopinath

2007 September to 2008: Public places Private Spaces, contemporary photography and video art in India. Newark Museum, and Minneopolis art Institute. Curator Gayatri Sinha.

2007 July: 2nd International Artists’ Airshow. Gunpowder Park, Essex, London. A collaboration between Gunpowder park and Arts Catalyst, London.

2007 May: Classe de Danse, Photos and video related to movement. Progr, Bern. Switzerland. Curated by Alessio Fransoni and Ilari Valbonesi

2007 March: I fear, I believe, I desire Gallery Espace, New Delhi. Curator Gayatri Sinha.

2007 January: Private/Corporate IV: Works from the Lekha and Anupam Poddar, New Delhi, and DaimlerChrysler Collections. Curators Renate Wiehager.

2007 November to December: Out of the Box: Carolee Schneemann and her influence on young contemporary gallery Elga Wimmer, New York. Corator elga Wimmer.

2006 November: Canarias Media art Festival, Grand Canary Island

2006 October: Pasaeges, Palais de Bozar, Brussels. Curator Deepak ananth, Jany Lauga.

2006 October: Bombay Maximum City, Lille, France.

2006 September: Hungry God a survey Exhibition of contemporary Indian Art. Arario Beijing.

2006 July: Art on the beach [inc the book, Made by Indians] Gallerie Enrico Navara

2006 June: Sub-contingent: The South Asian Subcontinent in Contemporary art, Fondazione Sandretto Re Rebaudengo, Torino.

Residencies:

2001 to 2003: 2-year research Residency, the Rijksakademie Amsterdam

2008 summer: A self proposed, off-site residency supported by O.C.A., Norway 2008.

2007: travelling, short period, artist residency. Supported by GegenwArt, and Kunstmuseum Berne, Switzerland 2007.

2006 April to June: 2 month, project production residency at Werklitz, Germany.

2006 June to August: 2-month residency at Internationale DesArts, Paris. Supported by InstitutFrancais, New Delhi.

2006 August to October: 2-month residency at Institute for Media Arts/CASA ASIA, Barcelona.

2000 October: KHOJ International workshop (through the Triangle Trust), Modinagar, India

1998 summer: Studio Residency at the Ecole Internationale DesArts, Paris, for the students of Royal College of art, London.

Collections:

Public collections:

- collection of the audio-visual department at Centre Pompidou, Paris
- Moon Chow collection, Hong Kong
- Dacra Art Center, Florida
- Daimler Chrysler collection, Berlin
- Lekha and anupam Poddar collection (Devi Art Foundation), Delhi
- Spencer Museum of art, Kansas
- Kiran Nadar Museum of Art, India

Private collections:

- Alessia Bulgari private collection, Rome
- Mortimer Chatterjee and tara Lal, Bombay
- Anurag Khanna's private collection, Ahmedabad
- Shalini Passi's private collection, Delhi
- Diego Strazzer, Milan
- Priya Paul, Park hotels, Delhi
- Eegje Schoo, Amsterdam

== Awards ==
1997: INLAKS Award, India. [Grant including complete expenses for two years, to pursue Masters at the Royal College Of Art, London.]

2001: Research grant, Ministry of Education, The Netherlands. [ invitation and Grant including complete expenses for two years, to pursue artistic research at the Rijksakademie, Amsterdam.]

2006: A two-month Research Grant to realise a new project at Werkleitz, Germany. [ I realized the video project ‘five visits ]

2003: A modest support grant by Josine De Bruyn Kops Fonds for visual media Artists, the Netherlands.

1993: Sailoz Mukherjee Award for best graduate student, College of art, New Delhi.

Recent participations in talks, seminars and performance events:

2015 September: Panelist for the B.B.C., art hour, staged at the British council, New Delhi.

2015 September: Presentation by Sonia Khurana on her practice at the Shiv Nadar University, Greater Noida.

2015 February: "body matters/bodis matter: Performance lecture by Sonia Khurana, on the occasion of the closing of the exhibition: progress and hygiene at the Zachenta Nations Museum of modern art, Warsaw.

2014 March: Panel discussion: On "Oneiric house", ongoing solo exhibition. Panelists: Dr. Geeta Kapur, Gayatri sinha, Roobina Karode, Sonia Khurana.

2014 November: Panel discussion on individual practices at Kiran Nadar Museum, New Delhi. Panelists: Kumkum Sangari, Gayatri Sinha, Nilima Sheikh, Sonia Khurana.

2013 March: Symposium: ‘On scale, site and poetics of recent exhibitions, speaker, for the panel on ‘Vision Documenta’, at School of Arts & Aesthetics, Jawaharlal Nehru University, New Delhi.

2012 January: Performance art: the medium of the century. Discussant for panel discussion at India Art Fair, with co-panelists Rosalee Goldberg and Geeta Kapur.

2010 October: Participation, in the exhibition as well as the forum, with both installation and performance for the exhibition: from the West heavens: place/time/play. A large exhibition in Shanghai that happens concurrent to, and in conjunction with the Shanghai Biennale.

2010 September: Public talk as part of the Liverpool biennale: In conversation: Sonia Khurana and Catherine Butterworth [ field notes from lying down on the ground ] at the Liverpool John Moores University.

2010 August: Invited to an artists talk to one of Tokyo's leading artists’ spaces : AIT, in Tokyo.In conversation with Roger Macdonald, writer & teacher in visual arts.

2010 August: Invited to participate in the ongoing aichi triennale in Nagoya, Japan, with a multi channel installation: video/ text/ image [lightboxes] and a public performance event: "lying down on the ground" at the aichi trielnnale, Nagoya, Japan.

2010 July to August: A performance-led workshop at the New Art Exchange in Nottingham, working with local youth and women students from girls school

2010 June: Invited to the art department, at the University o Kansas, for a recce trip, in order to explore and research themes for a performance-led workshop with students.

2010 May: Art Institutions and Feminist Politics Now invited speaker at symposium at Museum of Modern Art, New York.

2010 May: Artists’ space: Rosascape Paris invited for first edition of a series of talks titled: "who's talking". In conversation with Chantal Pontbriand.

2010 May: " Beyond the spectacle: Performance practices and audience experiments" closed-door, think tank at the Museum of modern art, New York.

Guest teaching:

- Shiv Nadar University, fine arts Department Delhi NCR [ current visiting faculty].
- Rhode Island School of design, Providence.
- University of Western Cape in South Africa, D.I.T., Durban.
- National School of Drama, new Delhi, District Six Museum, Cape Town.
- Mohille Parikh lecture series, N.C.P.A., Bombay, M.S.University, Baroda, Chitra Kala Parishad, Bangalore.
- Jawaharlal Nehru University, department of performing arts, New Delhi.
- University of Michigan, Ann Arbor.
- Spenser school of art, Kansas, Lawrence.
- Utrecht school of art and Design, University of Newcastle, Department of Fine Arts.
- University of East London.
- Royal College of Art, London.

== Publications ==
Small publications on artists’ solo exhibitions:

Oneiric house: round about midnight: moving image, music, text. an off-site exhibition with the Kiran Nadar Museum of art, New Delhi, at Outset India foundation in Jorbagh. Printed at Archana Printers, New Delhi. Supported and distributed by the Nadar Museum of art, Delhi.

Five visits Solo exposition the Max Muller Bhavan/ Goethe institut, Delhi. 2009 March Printed at Archana Printers, New Delhi. Supported and distributed by the Goethe Institute, New Delhi.

Lone women don't lie first solo exposition of work in video and digital media, 2000 September. Printed at Archana Printers, New Delhi. Supported and distributed by the British council, New Delhi.

Select essays on/including Sonia Khurana [apart from minor texts in all exhibition catalogues] Difficult loves : Seven Contemporaries, Kiran Nadar Museum of Art, New Delhi. Essay on Sonia Khurana by Roobina Karode. Published in 2014, by Kiran Nadar Museum of art, Delhi.

Aesthetic bind – Phantomata. Essay on the exhibitions by Dr Geeta Kapur, Published in 2013, by gallery Chemould Prescott road, Bombay.

Place time play project: west heavens: artistic, cultural exchange between China and India. Shanghai.

‘lying down on the ground: additional notes’, a Proposal-as-poem, by Sonia Khurana, Published in 2010 Oct to Dec, in the book, West Heavens, By Hanart Gallery, Hong Kong.

India Moderna IVAM, Valencia and Billboards across the city. A Q and A between Nancy Adajania and Sonia Khurana, published in the book India Moderna, in 2008 December. Where in the world, Devi Art Foundation, curated by the art&aesthetics deptt, J.N.U., a short text on sonia Khurana's video ‘bird’, by Natasha Ginwala, 2008 December, Published by Devi Art Foundation.

An Essay on Sonia Khurana, focusing on the video: head hand, by Brinda Kuma and Latika Gupta, for the exhibition, Self into Social, Deptt of arts and aesthetics, J.N.U. New Delhi. 2005 March

Nowhere: Addressing place in video/installation art from India: the works of Sonia Khurana, Navjot Altaf, Shilpa Gupta and Vivan Sundaram by Dr. Elena Bernadini on for Tate publications, 2004

A Phenomenology of Origins: Sonia Khurana in Sonia Khurana: for Lone Women Don't Lie New Delhi: Max Mueller Bhavan and The British Council, New Delhi Calcutta: Published as Exhibition catalogue essay, in 2000, and as a chapter in Dr. Waiwright's Phd thesis at SOAS.

Gender Mobility: Through the Lens of Five Women Artists, and essay by Dr. Geeta Kapur, including a comprehensive section on arstis Sonia Khurana. Published in the book: Global Feminisms, on the occasion of exhibition by the same title, by the Brooklyn museum, 2007 March.

The Logic of Birds: Points of Departure for Indian Women Artists by Nancy Adajania, for the publication: Tiger by the Tail Rose Museum, Brandies University, Boston. 2007 October

The first, comprehensive monograph on Sonia Khurana's work, is to be published by the Kiran Nadar Museum of Art, New Delhi in 2016. Books/ catalogues/ essays, authored or co-authored by Sonia Khurana, that exist online

On flower carrier, a conversation with Nancy Adajania published in the book: India Moderna, published, by IVAM, museum for contemporary art, Valencia on the solo exhibition: Oneiric House: round about midnight Ongoing Conversation: artist Sonia Khurana with writer Belinder Dhanoa. Also published in Domus India, journal for art and architecture, in Ademedia.og (academic journal) and Critical collective: online journal
