= Nancy Adajania =

Indian cultural theorist, art critic and independent curator

- Born: 1971 (age 54–55); Mumbai, India
- Occupations: Cultural theorist, art critic, independent curator
- Spouse: Ranjit Hoskote

Nancy Adajania (born 1971) is an Indian cultural theorist, art critic and independent curator.

== Early life and education ==
Nancy Adajania was born in 1971 in Mumbai, India. She was educated at the Princess Alexandra School, Elphinstone College, where she read Politics for her BA, the Sophia Polytechnic, Bombay, where she took a diploma in Social Communications Media, and the Film and Television Institute of India (FTII), Pune, where she studied film.

== Professional career ==
Adajania has written and lectured extensively on contemporary Indian art, especially new media art and its political and cultural contexts, at international venues such as Documenta 11, Kassel; the Zentrum für Kunst und Medientechnologie (ZKM), Karlsruhe; the Neuer Berliner Kunstverein and the Transmediale, Berlin; the Danish Contemporary Art Foundation, Copenhagen; Lottringer 13, Munich, among others.

The focus of Adajania's writing, research and curatorial interests is the relationship between the artistic imagination and the technological resources and potentialities available to it in any particular society and period. She has proposed several conceptual tools with which to examine the consequences of newness across various sectors of cultural production. These include the concepts of the 'new folkloric imagination', 'new context media', and 'mediatic realism'. Adajania has reflected, in several essays and lectures, on the aesthetic and political effects of what, following the theorist Paul Virilio, she terms dromomania, an obsession with speed produced by the globalisation of communicative and distributive processes. In another strand of her engagement with the politics of cultural acts, Adajania has addressed the question of redefining public art within the particularity of regional public spheres.

Adajania was co-curator for the exhibition 'Zoom! Art in Contemporary India' (Lisbon, April 2004) and curated 'Avatars of the Object: Sculptural Projections' (Bombay, August 2006). She was also contributing curator for 'Thermocline of Art: New Asian Waves' (ZKM, Karlsruhe, Summer 2007). In 2011, Adajania was appointed Joint Artistic Director of the 9th Gwangju Biennale (Korea, 2012).

As the first coordinator of the newly founded crafts research department of the National Centre for the Performing Arts (NCPA), Bombay during 1994–1995, Adajania organised a cycle of symposia and workshops that explored the tension between contemporary art emerging from an urban milieu and the present-day manifestation of the traditional crafts. Adajania intended these symposia revisit and update the debates surrounding this tension, and to generate a new discourse in the field, this cycle of meetings included the national-level seminar, 'Should the Crafts Survive?', which dramatised the rival claims on the terrain of the contemporary, made by academy-trained metropolitan artists and artists of rural, tribal or folk background articulating their own modernity (1995).

== Major works ==
Adajania has contributed essays and reviews to Springerin (Vienna), Metamute (London), Art 21 (Paris), Public Art (Minneapolis), Art Asia Pacific (New York), X-Tra (Los Angeles) and the Documenta 12 Magazine (Kassel, 2007). As Editor-in-Chief of Art India (2000–2002), she developed a discursive space, in an Asian context, for emergent new-media and interactive public art practices and social projects on a global level.

Adajania's film, 'Khichri Ek Khoj' (In Search of Khichri) (1999), weaves the documentary and the global meta-narrative forms together to "unveil the workings of a failed postcolonial welfare state", and has been screened at various venues in India and internationally, including the Mumbai International Film Festival (Bombay, 2000), in 'First Story: Women Building: New Narratives for the 21st Century' (Galeria do Palacio Cristal, Porto, 2001) and during the international symposium, 'Capital and Karma: Conversations between India and Europe' (Kunsthalle Wien, Vienna, April 2002).

== Awards and recognition ==
In 2004–2005, Adajania was awarded an Independent Research fellowship by Sarai CSDS, a new-media initiative of the Centre for the Study of Developing Societies (CSDS), New Delhi (2004–2005), under which she studied the popular use of digital manipulation techniques of imaging in metropolitan India. She has since presented her research in the form of an archive-installation, 'In Aladdin's Cave,' exhibited at 'On difference 2/Grenzwertig' (Wuerttembergischer Kunstverein, Stuttgart, February 2006) and 'Building Sight' (Watermans Arts Centre, London, Summer 2007).

Adajania has also been developing an account of transcultural artistic practice, with its political and ethical referents as well as its institutional conditions. Adajania's specific concern is with situating the 'entanglements' (she uses the art theorist and curator Sarat Maharaj's term) between regional histories of artistic and intellectual production and a global system that is structured in terms of a Western art-historical understanding. Some of this writing has emerged from a collaboration with Ranjit Hoskote.

Adajania has held an Associate Fellowship with Sarai CSDS, and is in the process of establishing, jointly with Ranjit Hoskote, a new journal of critical inquiry in the visual arts. She has served as a member of the Academic Advisory Board of the Asian Art Archive, Hong Kong.

Adajania was a Co-Artistic Director of ROUNDTABLE: The 9th Gwangju Biennale (Korea, 2012).

== Personal life ==
Adajania is married to the renowned Indian English poet Ranjit Hoskote.

== Bibliography ==
- "Ranbir Kaleka".
- Atul Dodiya/ Saptapadi: Scenes from Marriage (Regardless). (Essay co-authored by Nancy Adajania and Ranjit Hoskote. Vadehra Art Gallery, New Delhi 2007) ISBN 978-81-87737-66-7
- Shilpa Gupta. (Ed. with monographic essay by Nancy Adajania. Prestel, Munich/ London 2010) ISBN 978-3-7913-5017-2 REVIEW REVIEW
- Anish Kapoor. (Essays by Homi K. Bhabha and Nancy Adajania. British Council/ Lisson Gallery, London, 2010) ISBN 978-0-86355-652-4
- Shilpa Gupta: BlindStars StarsBlind. (Essays by Shaheen Merali, Nancy Adajania, Hans Ulrich Obrist and Julia Peyton-Jones. Kehrer Verlag, Heidelberg 2010) ISBN 978-3-86828-018-0
- The Dialogues Series. (co-authored with Ranjit Hoskote; Popular Prakashan/ Foundation B&G, Mumbai 2011; first five books in an 'unfolding programme of conversations with artists'):
- Anju Dodiya ISBN 978-81-7991-634-6
- Atul Dodiya ISBN 978-81-7991-635-3
- Veer Munshi ISBN 978-81-7991-638-4
- Manu Parekh ISBN 978-81-7991-637-7
- Baiju Parthan ISBN 978-81-7991-636-0 INTERVIEW

== Exhibitions curated ==
- 'Zoom! Art in Contemporary India' (Culturgest Museum, Lisbon, April 2004. Artists: Anita Dube, Atul Dodiya, Baiju Parthan, Dayanita Singh, Jitish Kallat, Nalini Malani, Navjot Altaf, Ranbir Kaleka, Reena Saini Kallat, Shantibai, Shilpa Gupta, Sonia Khurana, Subodh Gupta, Sudarshan Shetty, Sudharak Olwe, Tallur L N, Tejal Shah, The Cybermohalla Project, TV Santhosh, Vivan Sundaram)
- 'Avatars of the Object: Sculptural Projections’ (National Centre for the Performing Arts, Bombay, August 2006. Supported by the Guild Art Gallery. Artists: Anita Dube, Jehangir Jani, Kausik Mukhopadhyay, Mithu Sen, Navjot Altaf, Pooja Iranna, Shilpa Gupta, Subodh Gupta, M S Umesh)
- 'To See is To Change: A Parallax View of 40 Years of German Video Art' (a re-curation of the globally circulating Goethe-Institut collection, '40 Years of German Video Art', as a 2-day annotated screening cycle and symposium by a group of theorists, artists and enthusiasts: Nancy Adajania, Shaina Anand, Ranjit Hoskote, Ashok Sukumaran, Kabir Mohanty, Mriganka Madhukaillya, Kaushik Bhaumik, Devdutt Trivedi and Rana Dasgupta; Jnanapravaha & Chemould Prescott Road, Bombay, 14–15 November 2008). CONCEPT, DESCRIPTION & SCHEDULE ARCHIVAL VIDEO
- 'The Landscapes of Where' (Galerie Mirchandani + Steinruecke, Bombay, April–May 2009. Artists: Mriganka Madhukaillya, Pooja Iranna, Prajakta Palav Aher, Prajakta Potnis, Sonal Jain)CURATORIAL ESSAY
- 'Your name is different there' (Volte, Bombay, December 2011 – January 2012. Artists: Sheba Chhachhi, Sonia Khurana, Ranbir Kaleka, CAMP)
- Co-Artistic Director, The 9th Gwangju Biennale (Gwangju, South Korea, September–November 2012)
