= Ranjit Hoskote =

Indian poet and curator (born 1969)

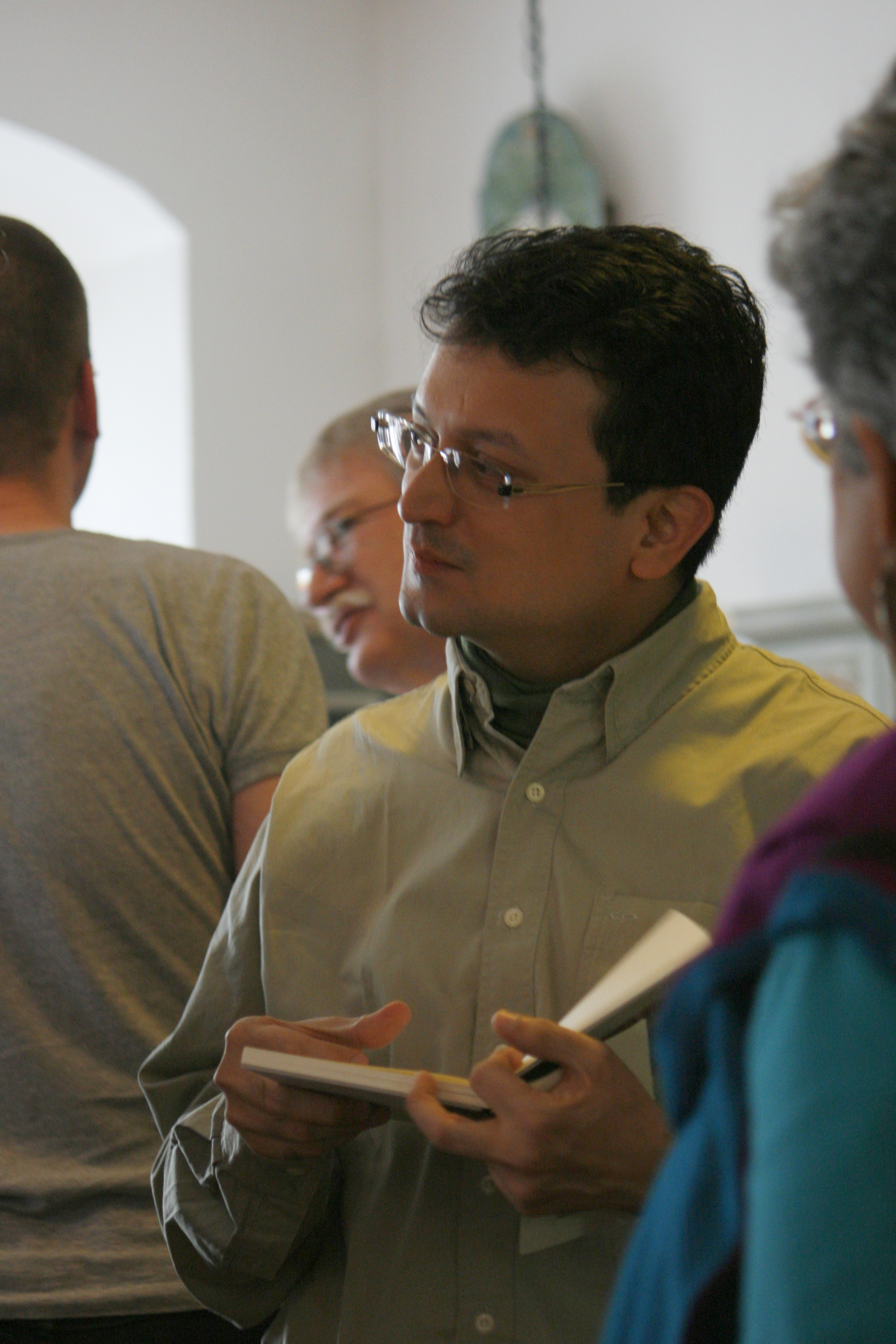
- Hoskote at Leselenz Hausach 2012
- Born: 1969 (age 56–57); Bombay, (now Mumbai), India
- Occupations: Contemporary Indian poet, art critic, cultural theorist and independent curator
- Spouse: Nancy Adajania
- Writing career
- Notable works: Jonahwhale; Hunchprose
- Notable awards: Sahitya Akademi

Ranjit Hoskote (born 1969) is an Indian poet, art critic, cultural theorist and independent curator. He has been honoured by the Sahitya Akademi, India's National Academy of Letters, with the Sahitya Akademi Golden Jubilee Award and the Sahitya Akademi Prize for Translation. In 2022, Hoskote received the 7th JLF-Mahakavi Kanhaiyalal Sethia Award for Poetry.

== Early life and education ==
Ranjit Hoskote was born in Mumbai and educated at the Bombay Scottish School, Elphinstone College, where he studied for a BA in Politics, and later at University of Bombay, from where he obtained an MA degree in English Literature and Aesthetics.

== Career ==
=== As poet ===
Hoskote began to publish his work during the early 1990s. He is the author of several collections of poetry including Zones of Assault, The Cartographer's Apprentice, Central Time, Jonahwhale, The Sleepwalker's Archive and Vanishing Acts: New & Selected Poems 1985–2005. Hoskote has been seen as extending the Anglophone Indian poetry tradition established by Dom Moraes, Nissim Ezekiel, A.K. Ramanujan and others through "major new works of poetry". His work has been published in numerous Indian and international journals, including Poetry Review (London), Wasafiri, Poetry Wales, Nthposition, The Iowa Review, Green Integer Review, Fulcrum (annual), Rattapallax, Lyric Poetry Review, West Coast Line, Kavya Bharati, Prairie Schooner, Coldnoon: Travel Poetics, The Four-Quarters Magazine and Indian Literature. His poems have also appeared in German translation in Die Zeit, Akzente, the Neue Zuercher Zeitung, Wespennest and Art & Thought/ Fikrun-wa-Fann. He has translated the Marathi poet Vasant Abaji Dahake, co-translated the German novelist and essayist Ilija Trojanow, and edited an anthology of contemporary Indian verse. His poems have appeared in anthologies including Language for a New Century (New York: W. W. Norton, 2008). and The Bloodaxe Book of Contemporary Indian Poets (Newcastle: Bloodaxe, 2008).

Hoskote has also translated the 14th-century Kashmiri mystic-poet Lal Ded, variously known as Lalleshwari, Lalla and Lal Arifa, for the Penguin Classics imprint, under the title I, Lalla: The Poems of Lal Ded. This publication marks the conclusion of a 20-year-long project of research and translation for the author.

Reviewing Hoskote's third volume, The Sleepwalker's Archive, for The Hindu in 2001, the poet and critic Keki Daruwalla wrote: "It is the way he hangs on to a metaphor, and the subtlety with which he does it, that draws my admiration (not to mention envy)... Hoskote’s poems bear the 'watermark of fable': behind each cluster of images, a story; behind each story, a parable. I haven’t read a better poetry volume in years."

Commenting on Hoskote's poetry on Poetry International Web, the poet and editor Arundhathi Subramaniam observes: "His writing has revealed a consistent and exceptional brilliance in its treatment of image. Hoskote’s metaphors are finely wrought, luminous and sensuous, combining an artisanal virtuosity with passion, turning each poem into a many-angled, multifaceted experience."

In 2004, a year in which Indian poetry in English lost three of its most important figures – Ezekiel, Moraes, and Arun Kolatkar – Hoskote wrote obituaries for these "masters of the guild". Hoskote has also written about the place of poetry in contemporary culture.

As a literary organiser, Hoskote has been associated with the PEN All-India Centre, the Indian branch of International PEN, since 1986, and is currently its general secretary, as well as Editor of its journal, Penumbra. He has also been associated with the Poetry Circle Bombay since 1986, and was its president from 1992 to 1997.

In 2024, he published "To Break and To Branch: Six Essays on Gieve Patel" and a translation of Mir Taqi Mir’s "The Homeland's an Ocean".

=== As art critic ===
Hoskote has been placed by research scholars in a historic lineage of five major art critics active in India over a sixty-year period: "William George Archer, Richard Bartholomew, Jagdish Swaminathan, Geeta Kapur, and Ranjit Hoskote... played an important role in shaping contemporary art discourse in India, and in registering multiple cultural issues, artistic domains, and moments of history." Hoskote was principal art critic for The Times of India, Bombay, from 1988 to 1999. In his role as religion and philosophy editor for The Times, he began a popular column on spirituality, sociology of religion, and philosophical commentary, "Speaking Tree" (he named the column, which was launched in May 1996, after the benchmark 1971 study of Indian society and culture, The Speaking Tree, written by scholar and artist Richard Lannoy). Hoskote was an art critic and senior editor with The Hindu, from 2000 to 2007, contributing to its periodical of thought and culture, Folio.

In his role as an art critic, Hoskote has authored a critical biography as well as a major retrospective study of the painter Jehangir Sabavala, and also monographs on the artists Atul Dodiya, Tyeb Mehta, Sudhir Patwardhan, Baiju Parthan, Bharti Kher and Iranna GR. He has written major essays on other leading Indian artists, including, among others, Gieve Patel, Bhupen Khakhar, Akbar Padamsee, Mehlli Gobhai, Vivan Sundaram, Laxman Shreshtha, Surendran Nair, Jitish Kallat, the Raqs Media Collective, Shilpa Gupta and Sudarshan Shetty. Hoskote has also written a monographic essay on the Berlin-based artists Dolores Zinny and Juan Maidagan.

=== As cultural theorist ===
As a cultural theorist, Hoskote has addressed the cultural and political dynamics of postcolonial societies that are going through a process of globalisation, emphasising the possibilities of a 'non-western contemporaneity', "intercultural communication" and "transformative listening". He has also returned often to the theme of the "nomad position" and to the polarity between "crisis and critique". In many of his writings and lectures, Hoskote examines the relationship between the aesthetic and the political, describing this as a tension between the politics of the expressive and the expressivity of the political. He has explored, in particular, the connections between popular visual art, mass mobilisations and the emergence of fluid and fluctuating identities within the evolving metropolitan cultures of the postcolonial world, and in what he has called the nascent "third field" of artistic production by subaltern producers in contemporary India, which is "neither metropolitan nor rural, neither (post)modernist nor traditional, neither derived from academic training nor inherited without change from tribal custom" and assimilates into itself resources from the global archive of cultural manifestations.

Hoskote has also speculated, in various essays, on the nature of a "futurative art" possessed of an intermedia orientation, and which combines critical resistance with expressive pleasure. He writes that "the modern art-work is often elegiac in nature: it mourns the loss of beauty through scission and absence; it carries within its very structure a lament for the loss of beauty."

In a series of essays, papers and articles published from the late 1990s onward, Hoskote has reflected on the theme of the asymmetry between a 'West' that enjoys economic, military and epistemological supremacy and an 'East' that is the subject of sanction, invasion and misrepresentation. In some of these writings, he dwells on the historic fate of the "House of Islam" as viewed from the West and from India, while in others, he retrieves historic occasions of successful cultural confluence, when disparate belief systems and ethnicities have come together into a fruitful and sophisticated hybridity.

Hoskote, in collaboration with his wife, Nancy Adajania, has focused on transcultural artistic practice, its institutional conditions, systems of production and creative outcomes, and the radical transformations that it brings about in the relationship between regional art histories and a fast-paced global art situation that is produced within the international system of biennials, collaborative projects, residencies and symposia.

=== As curator ===
Hoskote was co-curator of the 7th Gwangju Biennale (2008) in South Korea, collaborating with Okwui Enwezor and Hyunjin Kim.

In 2011, Hoskote was invited to act as curator of the first-ever professionally curated national pavilion of India at the Venice Biennale, organised by the Lalit Kala Akademi, India's National Academy of Art. Hoskote titled the pavilion "Everyone Agrees: It's About To Explode", and selected works by the artists Zarina Hashmi, Gigi Scaria, Praneet Soi, and the Desire Machine Collective for it. The pavilion was installed in the central Artiglierie section of the Arsenale. Hoskote wrote that his pavilion was "intended to serve as a laboratory in which we will test out certain key propositions concerning the contemporary Indian art scene. Through it, we could view India as a conceptual entity that is not only territorially based, but is also extensive in a global space of the imagination." In making his selection of artists, the curator aimed to "represent a set of conceptually rigorous and aesthetically rich artistic practices that are staged in parallel to the art market. Furthermore, these have not already been valorized by the gallery system and the auction-house circuit.... The Indian manifestation will also focus on artistic positions that emphasize the cross-cultural nature of contemporary artistic production: some of the most significant art that is being created today draws on a diversity of locations, and different economies of image-making and varied cultural histories."

Hoskote was a member of the international jury that selected Armenia as recipient of the Golden Lion for best national participation at the 56th Venice Biennale in 2015.

In 2023, Hoskote was part of the six-person search committee for the artistic director of Documenta’s 2027 edition. On 14 November, he resigned from his position at Documenta after the exhibition publicly criticized him for signing a BDS India letter in 2019, calling it "explicitly anti-Semitic". The letter in question had denounced a "Zionism and Hindutva" event hosted by the Israeli consulate in Mumbai and co-organized by the Indo-Israel Friendship Association; the letter also called Israel an "apartheid state" engaging in "settler colonialism". Over the following two days, the entire committee resigned, citing the social climate created by the Gaza war in an open letter, and Documenta's "unchallenged media and public discrediting" of Hoskote in particular.

=== As cultural activist ===
Hoskote is a defender of cultural freedoms against the monopolistic claims of the State, religious pressure groups and censors, whether official or self-appointed. He has been involved in organising protest campaigns in defence of victims of cultural intolerance.

=== Awards, grants and residencies ===
Hoskote has been a Visiting Writer and Fellow of the International Writing Program of the University of Iowa (1995) and was writer-in-residence at Villa Waldberta, Bavaria (2003). He has also held a writing residency as part of the Goethe-Institut/Polnisches Institut project, "The Promised City: Warsaw/Berlin/Mumbai" (2010). He was awarded the Sanskriti Award for Literature, 1996, and won All India Poetry Prize at British Council/Poetry Society All-India Poetry Competition, 1997. India's National Academy of Letters honoured him with the Sahitya Akademi Golden Jubilee Award in 2004. The S. H. Raza Foundation conferred its 2006 Raza Award for Literature on Hoskote.

Hoskote has held an Associate Fellowship with Sarai CSDS, a new-media initiative of the Centre for the Study of Developing Societies (CSDS), New Delhi, and is in the process of developing, jointly with Nancy Adajania, a new journal of critical inquiry in the visual arts.

Hoskote has been researcher-in-residence at BAK/basis voor actuele kunst, Utrecht, and is a contributor to BAK's long-term Former West platform. Hoskote currently lives and works in Mumbai.

== Bibliography ==
=== Poetry ===
- Zones of Assault (1991), Rupa Publishers, New Delhi ISBN 978-8171670635
- The Cartographer’s Apprentice. (Pundole Art Gallery, Mumbai 2000)
- The Sleepwalker’s Archive. (Single File, Mumbai 2001) REVIEW
- Vanishing Acts: New and Selected Poems 1985–2005. (Penguin Books India, New Delhi 2006) ISBN 0-14-306185-2 REVIEW REVIEW
- Die Ankunft der Vögel, German translation by Jürgen Brocan. (Carl Hanser Verlag, Munich 2006) ISBN 978-3-446-20771-4 REVIEW (in German) REVIEW (in German)
- Pale Ancestors. (poems by Ranjit Hoskote and paintings by Atul Dodiya; Bodhi Art, Mumbai 2008) ISBN 978-81-906398-2-8
- I, Lalla - The Poems of Lal Ded (2011), Penguin Classics ISBN 978-0143420781
- Central Time. (Penguin Books India/ Viking, New Delhi 2014) ISBN 9780670086818 AUTHOR INTERVIEW REVIEW AUTHOR PROFILE REVIEW REVIEW REVIEW FEATURE
- Jonahwhale (2018), Penguin Random House India ISBN 978-93-876250-2-0

REVIEW INTERVIEW

- The Atlas of Lost Beliefs (2020), Arc Publications ISBN 978-1911469636

REVIEW

- Hunchprose (2021), Penguin Hamish Hamilton ISBN 978-0670094905

REVIEW REVIEW

- Icelight (2023), Wesleyan University Press ISBN 978-0819500533

=== Non fiction ===
- Pilgrim, Exile, Sorcerer : The Painterly Evolution of Jehangir Sabavala (Eminence Designs, Mumbai 1998)
- Sudhir Patwardhan: The Complicit Observer. Eminence Designs/ Sakshi Gallery, Mumbai. 2004. ISBN 8190217003. Archived from the original on 28 June 2006. REVIEW
- The Crucible of Painting: The Art of Jehangir Sabavala. (Eminence Designs/ National Gallery of Modern Art, Mumbai 2005) ISBN 81-902170-9-7
- Ganesh Pyne: A Pilgrim in the Dominion of Shadows. (Galerie 88, Kolkata 2005)
- Baiju Parthan: A User's Manual. (Afterimage, Mumbai 2006) ISBN 81-903765-0-0 REVIEW
- The Dancer on the Horse: Reflections on the Art of Iranna GR. (Lund Humphries/ Ashgate Publishing, London 2007) ISBN 978-0-85331-965-8 EXTRACTS
- Bharti Kher. (Jack Shainman Gallery, New York 2007) ISBN 978-0-615-16806-7
- The Crafting of Reality: Sudhir Patwardhan, Drawings. (The Guild Art Gallery, Mumbai 2008) ISBN 978-81-903283-8-8 REVIEW
- Zinny & Maidagan: Das Abteil/ Compartment. (Museum für Moderne Kunst, Frankfurt/ Main & Verlag der Buchhandlung Walther König, Köln 2010) ISBN 978-3-86560-807-9
- The Dialogues Series. (co-authored with Nancy Adajania; Popular Prakashan/ Foundation B&G, Mumbai 2011; first five books in an 'unfolding programme of conversations with artists'):
- Anju Dodiya. ISBN 978-81-7991-634-6
- Atul Dodiya. ISBN 978-81-7991-635-3
- Veer Munshi. ISBN 978-81-7991-638-4
- Manu Parekh. ISBN 978-81-7991-637-7
- Baiju Parthan. ISBN 978-81-7991-636-0 INTERVIEW
- Praneet Soi. (essays by Charles Esche and Ranjit Hoskote; Distanz Verlag, Berlin 2011) ISBN 978-3-942405-42-3
- Atul Dodiya. (edited by Ranjit Hoskote, with texts by Thomas McEvilley, Enrique Juncosa, Nancy Adajania and Hoskote; Prestel Verlag, Munich, London & New York 2014) ISBN 978-3-7913-4833-9 REVIEW
- Kampfabsage. (co-authored with Ilija Trojanow; Random House/ Karl Blessing Verlag, Munich 2007) ISBN 978-3-89667-363-3 (in German)
- Despair and Modernity: Reflections from Modern Indian Painting. (co-authored with Harsha V. Dehejia and Prem Shankar Jha; Motilal Banarsidass, New Delhi 2000) ISBN 81-208-1755-9
- Confluences: Forgotten Histories From East And West (co-authored with Ilija Trojanow) (New Delhi, Yoda Press 2012) ISBN 978 81 9061 867 0

=== As editor ===
- Hoskote, Ranjit, ed. (2002). Reasons for Belonging : Fourteen Contemporary Indian Poets. New Delhi: Viking.
- Dom Moraes: Selected Poems. (Penguin Modern Classics, New Delhi 2012) ISBN 978-0-143-41832-0 REVIEW REVIEW REVIEW REVIEW REVIEW REVIEW INTERVIEW

=== As translator ===
- Dahake, Vasant Abaji (1992). A Terrorist of the Spirit. Trans. Ranjit Hoskote. New Delhi: Harper Collins Indus.
- Ilija Trojanow, Along the Ganga: To the Inner Shores of India. (Penguin Books India, New Delhi 2005) ISBN 0-14-303165-1
- Ilija Trojanow, Along the Ganges. (British edition: Haus Publishing, London 2005) ISBN 1-904950-36-1
- I, Lalla: The Poems of Lal Ded. (Penguin Classics, New Delhi 2011) ISBN 978-0-670-08447-0 REVIEW REVIEW REVIEW REVIEW REVIEW REVIEW REVIEW REVIEW REVIEW CRITICAL RECOMMENDATION CRITICAL RECOMMENDATION

== Poetry Anthologies ==
- Language for a New Century (2008) ed. Tina Chang, Nathalie Handal and Ravi Shankar. Published by W. W. Norton & Company.
- The Bloodaxe Book of Contemporary Indian Poets (2008) ed. Jeet Thayil. Published by Bloodaxe Books.
- Staying Human: New Poems for Staying Alive (2020) ed. Neil Astley. Published by Bloodaxe Books.
- Singing in the Dark (2020) ed. K. Satchidanandan and Nishi Chawla. Published by Penguin Vintage.
- Ten Poems about Swimming (2022) ed. Samantha Wynne-Rydderch. Published by Candlestick Press.

== Exhibitions curated ==
- 'Hinged by Light' (paintings and sculptural departures by three major Indian abstractionists: Mehlli Gobhai, Prabhakar Kolte, Yogesh Rawal; Pundole Art Gallery, Bombay, January 1994).
- 'Private Languages' (paintings, sculptures and assemblages by three emerging Indian artists: Anandajit Ray, Ravinder Reddy, Sudarshan Shetty; Pundole Art Gallery, Bombay, January 1997).
- 'Making An Entrance' (site-specific public-art installations by the artists Jehangir Jani, Bharati Kapadia, Kausik Mukhopadhyay, Baiju Parthan and Sudarshan Shetty, set up in the Kala Ghoda precinct, Bombay's old colonial quarter, during the Kala Ghoda Arts Festival 2000; Bombay, February 2000).
- 'Intersections: Seven Artistic Dialogues between Abstraction and Figuration' (paintings and mixed-media works by Chittrovanu Mazumdar, Mehlli Gobhai, Bharati Kapadia, Yogesh Rawal, Baiju Parthan, C. Douglas and Jitish Kallat; The Guild Art Gallery, Bombay, February 2000).
- 'Family Resemblances: Nine Approaches to a Mutable Self' (paintings by Laxman Shreshtha, Sachin Karne, Atul Dodiya, Jitish Kallat, Baiju Parthan, Amitava Das, Surendran Nair, Anju Dodiya and Gargi Raina; The Birla Academy of Art & Culture, Bombay, March 2000).
- 'The Bodied Self' (paintings by Anju Dodiya, Jehangir Jani and Theodore Mesquita; Gallery Sans Tache, Bombay, April 2001).
- 'Labyrinth/ Laboratory' (a mid-career retrospective of Atul Dodiya, including paintings, sculpture-installations and assemblages, at the invitation of the Japan Foundation; Japan Foundation Asia Center, Tokyo, June–July 2001).
- 'The Active Line' (drawings by Jehangir Sabavala, Mehlli Gobhai, Laxma Goud, Manjit Bawa and Jogen Chowdhury; The Guild Art Gallery, Bombay, December 2001)
- 'Clicking into Place' (a trans-Asian exhibition—the Indian phase of 'Under Construction', below—including paintings by Alfredo Esquillo/ Manila, Shibu Natesan/ London, Jitish Kallat/ Bombay, and a digital installation by Baiju Parthan/ Bombay; Sakshi Gallery, Bombay, February 2002).
- 'Under Construction' (Hoskote was co-curator for this collaborative curatorial project, initiated by the Japan Foundation Asia Center, which took place at various venues in Asia, culminating in an exhibition at the Japan Foundation Forum and the Tokyo Opera City Art Gallery, Tokyo, in December 2002). REVIEW
- 'Visions of Landscape' (paintings by Akbar Padamsee, Ram Kumar, Gulammohammed Sheikh, Sudhir Patwardhan, Laxman Shreshtha, Atul Dodiya and Shibu Natesan; The Guild Art Gallery, Bombay, January 2005).
- 'Jehangir Sabavala: A Retrospective' (a monographic exhibition of Sabavala's art, covering the period 1942–2005; The National Gallery of Modern Art: Bombay and New Delhi, November–December 2005).
- 'Strangeness' (paintings, drawings, mixed-media works and sculpture-installations by Krishen Khanna, Baiju Parthan, Theodore Mesquita, Viraj Naik, Tina Bopiah, Sunil Gawde, Rajeev Lochan, Riyas Komu, T. V. Santhosh, Krishnamachari Bose, Krishnaraj Chonat; Anant Art Gallery, Calcutta, January 2006).REPORT
- 'Aparanta: The Confluence of Contemporary Art in Goa' (a survey exhibition gathering together 265 art-works by 22 contemporary artists and 4 historic masters, ranging across oils, watercolours, drawings, graphics, mixed-media works, sculptures and video-installations; artists include F N Souza, V S Gaitonde, Angelo da Fonseca, Laxman Pai; Antonio e Costa, Alex Tavares, Wilson D'Souza, Sonia Rodrigues Sabharwal, Hanuman Kambli, Giraldo de Sousa, Vidya Kamat, Viraj Naik, Siddharth Gosavi, Pradeep Naik, Subodh Kerkar, Rajan Fulari, Rajendra Usapkar, Santosh Morajkar, Yolanda de Sousa-Kammermeier, Nirupa Naik, Chaitali Morajkar, Liesl Cotta De Souza, Querozito De Souza, Shilpa Mayenkar, Baiju Parthan, and Dayanita Singh; Old Goa Medical College Building/ Escola Medica e Cirurgica de Goa, for the Goa Tourism Development Corporation, Panjim, April 2007). CURATORIAL ESSAY REVIEW REVIEW
- The 7th Gwangju Biennale (Artistic Director: Okwui Enwezor; Curators: Ranjit Hoskote and Hyunjin Kim; Gwangju, South Korea, 5 September-9 November 2008).
- 'To See is To Change: A Parallax View of 40 Years of German Video Art' (a re-curation of the globally circulating Goethe-Institut collection, '40 Years of German Video Art', as a 2-day annotated screening cycle and symposium by a group of theorists, artists and enthusiasts: Nancy Adajania, Shaina Anand, Ranjit Hoskote, Ashok Sukumaran, Kabir Mohanty, Mriganka Madhukaillya, Kaushik Bhaumik, Devdutt Trivedi, and Rana Dasgupta; Jnanapravaha & Chemould Prescott Road, Bombay, 14–15 November 2008). CONCEPT, DESCRIPTION & SCHEDULE ARCHIVAL VIDEO
- 'ZIP Files' (an editorial selection from the Foundation B&G collection, including paintings, photographic works and sculptures by 24 contemporary artists, including Rameshwar Broota, Surendran Nair, Riyas Komu, Ram Rahman, N. S. Harsha, Nataraj Sharma, Valsan Koorma Kolleri, Jogen Chowdhury, Manu Parekh, Madhvi Parekh, Gargi Raina, Ajay Desai, Krishnamachari Bose, Sumedh Rajendran, Veer Munshi, Pooja Iranna, Baiju Parthan, Rekha Rodwittiya, G. R. Irannna, Ravi Kumar Kashi, H. G. Arunkumar, Subhash Awchat, K. S. Radhakrishnan, and Farhad Hussain; Foundation B&G & Tao Art Gallery, Bombay, February 2009 and Foundation B&G & Religare Arts Initiative, New Delhi, April 2009). REVIEW REVIEW
- 'Shrapnel' (an exhibition of recent works by Veer Munshi, developed through an ongoing dialogue between Munshi and Hoskote; the exhibition included extracts from the artist's ongoing photographic archive, 'Pandit Houses', and his painting-based installation, 'The Chamber'; Foundation B&G and Tao Art Gallery, Bombay, March 2009). CURATORIAL ESSAY
- 'The Pursuit of Intensity: Manu Parekh, Selected Works 2004–2009' (Foundation B&G and Tao Art Gallery, October 2009). CURATORIAL ESSAY
- 'Retrieval Systems' (an exhibition exploring the use of memory as resource in the work of Alex Fernandes, B. Manjunath Kamath, Baiju Parthan, G. R. Iranna, and Tina Bopiah; Art Alive, New Delhi, November 2009).
- 'Detour: Five Position Papers on the Republic' (an exhibition conceived as a 'critical homage' on the centennial of Gandhi's Hind Swaraj, 1909, with works by Dayanita Singh, Ram Rahman, Ravi Agarwal, Samar Jodha, and Sonia Jabbar; Chemould Prescott Road, Bombay, December 2009 – January 2010). CURATORIAL ESSAY, WORKS & INSTALLATION VIEWS
- Everyone Agrees: It's About To Explode (the India pavilion at the 54th Venice Biennale, La Biennale di Venezia, with works by Zarina Hashmi, Gigi Scaria, Praneet Soi, and the Desire Machine Collective/ Sonal Jain & Mriganka Madhukaillya; Arsenale, Venice, June–November 2011).
- 'The Needle on the Gauge: The Testimonial Image in the Work of Seven Indian Artists' (an exhibition featuring works by Indian photographers extending their practice through documentary projects, video works, blogs and social initiatives: Ravi Agarwal, Gauri Gill, Samar Jodha, Ryan Lobo, Veer Munshi, Ram Rahman, Gigi Scaria; CACSA/ Contemporary Art Centre of South Australia, Adelaide, September–October 2012).
- 'Nothing is Absolute: A Journey through Abstraction', co-curated by Ranjit Hoskote & Mehlli Gobhai (The Jehangir Nicholson Gallery, CSMVS/ formerly the Prince of Wales Museum, Bombay, February–August 2013). REVIEW REVIEW
- 'The 4th Former West Congress: Documents, Constellations, Prospects', co-convened by Boris Buden, Boris Groys, Kathrin Klingan, Maria Hlavajova, Ranjit Hoskote, Kathrin Rhomberg and Irit Rogoff (Haus der Kulturen der Welt, Berlin, March 2013).
- 'Experiments with Truth: Atul Dodiya, Works 1981–2013' (The National Gallery of Modern Art, New Delhi: November–December 2013).
- 'No Parsi is an Island', co-curated by Ranjit Hoskote & Nancy Adajania (The National Gallery of Modern Art/ NGMA, Mumbai: December 2013 – February 2014).
- 'Zameen' (an exhibition including works by Ravi Agarwal, Atul Dodiya, Vishwajyoti Ghosh, H. G. Arunkumar, Zarina Hashmi, Ranbir Kaleka, Ryan Lobo, Veer Munshi, Jagannath Panda, Baiju Parthan, Ashim Purkayastha, Ram Rahman, Gargi Raina, Gigi Scaria and Praneet Soi; Art District XIII, New Delhi: October 2014 – February 2015).
- 'The Shadow Trapper's Almanac: Tanmoy Samanta, Recent Works' (TARQ, Mumbai: November 2014 – January 2015).
- ‘Abby Weed Grey and Indian Modernism’, curated by Susan Hapgood and Ranjit Hoskote (New York University: Grey Art Gallery, New York City: January–March 2015).
- ‘Unpacking the Studio: Celebrating the Jehangir Sabavala Bequest’ (CSMVS, Mumbai: 15 September-31 December 2015).
- ‘The State of Architecture: Practices & Processes in India’, co-curated by Rahul Mehrotra, Ranjit Hoskote & Kaiwan Mehta (NGMA, Mumbai: 6 January-20 March 2016).
- ‘And the last shall be the first: G R Iranna, Works 1995-2015’ (NGMA Bangalore, 16 January-16 February 2016).
- ‘No Parsi is an Island’, co-curated by Ranjit Hoskote & Nancy Adajania (NGMA, Delhi: 20 March-29 May 2016).
- ‘The Quest for Cruzo: A Homage to the Art of Antonio Piedade da Cruz’ (Sunaparanta: Goa Centre for the Arts, Panjim: 30 June-20 July 2016).
- ‘Laxman Shreshtha: The Infinite Project’ (JNAF/ CSMVS, Mumbai: 2-part retrospective, 18 August-3 October + 14 October-31 December 2016).
- ‘DWELLING’ (10th anniversary show of Galerie Mirchandani + Steinruecke, Mumbai: 2 parts | Part 1: 10 November 2016 – 10 January 2017).
- ‘Terra Cognita? Three Moments in the History of the Graphic Image in India, 1556-2016’ (Serendipity Arts Festival, Palacio Idalcao, Panjim, Goa: 15 December 2016 – 15 March 2017).
- ‘DWELLING’ (10th anniversary show of Galerie Mirchandani + Steinruecke, Mumbai: 2 parts | Part 2: 29 March-29 May 2017).
- ‘In the Presence of Another Sky: Sakti Burman, A Retrospective’ (NGMA Mumbai: 17 October – 26 November 2017).
- ‘Anti-Memoirs: Locus, Language, Landscape’ (Serendipity Arts Festival, Palacio Idalcao, Panjim, Goa: 14–22 December 2017).
- ‘State of Housing: Aspirations, Imaginaries, Realities’, co-curated by Rahul Mehrotra, Ranjit Hoskote & Kaiwan Mehta (Max Mueller Bhavan, Mumbai: 2 February-18 March 2018).
- ‘The Sacred Everyday: Embracing the Risk of Difference’ (Serendipity Arts Festival, Palacio Idalcao, Panjim, & the Church of Santa Monica, Old Goa: 15 December 2018 – 15 January 2019).
- ‘No Place like the Present’ (Akara Art, Bombay: 16 January – 9 March 2019).
- 'The 20th' (20th anniversary show, Art Musings | Jehangir Art Gallery, Mumbai: 12–18 February 2019; extended through a cycle of 5 exhibitions at Art Musings across the year).
- ‘M F Husain: Horses of the Sun’ (MATHAF Arab Museum of Modern Art, Doha, Qatar: 20 March-1 July 2019).
- ‘Reverie and Reality: Jogen Chowdhury’ (Emami Art/ Kolkata Centre for Creativity, Kolkata: 20 September-7 December 2019).
- ‘Opening Lines: Ebrahim Alkazi, Works 1948-1971’ (Art Heritage + Shridharani Gallery, Delhi: 15 October – 11 November 2019).
- ‘Transients’, a solo exhibition of photographs by Sheetal Mallar (Art Musings, Mumbai: 9 January – 10 February 2020).
- ‘Don’t Ask Me About Colour: Mehlli Gobhai, A Retrospective’, co-curated by Ranjit Hoskote & Nancy Adajania (NGMA Mumbai: 6 March – 25 April 2020).
- ‘Patterns of Intensity’ [Artists: Chandrashekar Koteshwar, Ghana Shyam Latua, Barkha Gupta, Anil Thambai, Teja Gavankar, Meghna Patpatia, Suman Chandra, Savia Mahajan, Vipul Badva, Kaushik Saha, Purvai Rai] (Art Alive Gallery, Delhi: 3 – 30 April 2021).
- ‘Mehlli Gobhai: Epiphanies’, co-curated by Ranjit Hoskote & Nancy Adajania (Chemould Prescott Road, Mumbai: 23 July – 31 August 2021).
- ‘The Cymroza Chronicles’ | Cymroza at 50 (Cymroza Art Gallery, Mumbai: 1 September – 19 October 2021).
- ‘Mapping the Lost Spectrum’ | Cymroza at 50 (Pundole’s, Hamilton House, Mumbai: 1–14 September 2021).
- ‘F N Souza: The Power and the Glory’ (JNAF/ CSMVS, Mumbai: 29 October 2021 – 3 January 2022). REVIEW

== See also ==
- Indian English literature
- Indian Writing in English
- Nissim Ezekiel
- Dom Moraes
- International PEN
- Nancy Adajania
- Gwangju Biennale
- International Writing Program
