= Contemporary Indian Art =

Coordinates: 51°30′33″N 0°08′22″W

Contemporary Indian Art was an exhibition held from 18 September to 31 October 1982 at the Royal Academy of Arts in London. The exhibition was presented in two sections: The Gesture, and Motif, on view from 18 September to 5 October 1982, and Stories, Situations, on view from 9 October to 31 October 1982. The exhibition was co-curated by Akbar Padamsee, Richard Bartholomew, and Geeta Kapur.

The exhibition formed part of the Festival of India, a six-month cultural programme co-sponsored by the governments of the United Kingdom and India. At the opening, Prime Minister Indira Gandhi highlighted the significance of cultural ties between the two countries.

== Concept ==
The exhibition was conceived as a retrospective on the development and evolution of contemporary Indian art practices. The Festival Advisory Committee collaborated with major museums, galleries, institutions, and private collectors to assemble 133 artworks for the exhibition. The two sections, The Gesture, and Motif and Stories, Situations, were designed to highlight different approaches among artists working in or from India.

The first section focused on artists whose work emphasized stylized, emblematic imagery, often associated with modernist and abstract practices. These works were linked by what curator Geeta Kapur described as the "revealed motif", where imagery transcends specific historical contexts.

The second section concentrated on a younger generation of artists, whose works were often figurative and narrative-driven, reflecting everyday experiences and social contexts.

== Participating artists ==
45 artists were represented in the exhibition, with 133 artworks on display. Artists in the exhibition were A. Ramachandran, Adi Davierwalla, Akbar Padamsee, Anupam Sud, Arpita Singh, Bal Chhabda, Bhupen Khakhar, Bikash Bhattacharjee, Biren De, Dhruva Mistry, Francis Newton Souza, G.R. Santosh, Ganesh Pyne, Gieve Patel, Gulam Mohammed Sheikh, Himmat Shah, Jagdish Swaminathan, Jeram Patel, Jogen Chowdhury, K. Laxma Goud, K.C.S. Paniker, K.G. Subramanyan, Kanai Kunhiraman, Krishen Khanna, Krishna Reddy, Latika Katt, M.F. Husain, Manjit Bawa, Manu Parekh, Meera Mukherjee, Mohan Samant, Mrinalini Mukherjee, Nagji Patel, Nalini Malani, Nasreen Mohamedi, Ram Kumar, Ranbir Kaleka, S.H. Raza, Satish Gujral, Sudhir Patwardhan, Tyeb Mehta, V. S. Gaitonde, Ved Nayar, and Vivan Sundaram.
