= Wong Kit Yi =

Hong Kong artist

- Traditional Chinese: 黃潔宜
- Simplified Chinese: 黄洁宜
Transcriptions
Standard Mandarin
- Hanyu Pinyin: Huáng Jiéyí
Yue: Cantonese
- Jyutping: wong4 git3 ji4

Wong Kit Yi (Chinese: 黃潔宜) is a conceptual and performance artist who lives and works between Hong Kong and New York. She is known for her research-based projects, which blend art with science. She has exhibited her work in solo and group exhibitions in Hong Kong, New York, China and other countries around the world. Notable venues include P! Gallery, the Elizabeth Foundation, and the Queens Museum in New York; Para Site and a.m. space in Hong Kong; and Surplus Space and ART021 in China.

== Early life and education ==
Wong was born in Hong Kong in 1983 and raised in the New Territories, a rural region of Hong Kong. She received a BA from the Chinese University of Hong Kong, where she studied traditional ink painting, and an MFA from Yale University, where she studied closely with Jessica Stockholder and Jim Hodges. She currently teaches New Media and Film at the State University of New York at Purchase.

== Key concepts ==
Wong Kit Yi works through the mediums of video, sculpture, and performance. Exploring biological answers to metaphysical questions, she deals with odd scientific findings and the dysfunctional relationships between what is considered science and pseudoscience. Her contribution to a major exhibition at the Queens Museum in New York included an arrangement of gallery furniture based on the directions of a feng shui master. Her interests include genetics, DNA technology, mythology, Japanese manga, models of ownership/leasing, trade history and the biology of aging and immortality. Wong investigates the dynamics of ownership, working with such ideas as patron collaboration. Rather than selling some of her works, she offers 99-year leases . A series of works she offered at K gallery in New York offered buyers "commissioning contracts" in advance of her participation in the Artist Circle Expeditionary Residency: a journey that took a group of artists on a ship traveling to the North Pole. Each buyer eventually received an artwork Wong produced on the shipped, priced according to a complex formula that took climate change externalities and market forces into consideration. Her recent films are structured in the artist's signature karaoke-inspired sing-along format, switching between documentary and music-video-style content.

== Awards ==
2012, Susan H. Whedon Award, Yale University.

2006, Cheung's Creative Award, Department of Fine Arts, The Chinese University of Hong Kong.

2005, Sovereign Asian Art Prize finalist, Hong Kong.

== Selected exhibitions ==
=== Solo exhibitions ===
- Magic Wands, Batons and DNA Splicers, at Art Basel Hong Kong (2018).
- what if: my window animates you, at ART021 Shanghai (2017).
- Futures, Again, P!, New York (2017).
- Sandwich Theory: convertible painting series, a.m. space, Hong Kong (2016).
- North Pole Futures, K. gallery, New York (2015).

=== Group exhibitions ===
- Bicycle Thieves, Para Site, Hong Kong (2019)
- Peer to Peer, Surplus Space, Wuhan, China (2018).
- Seven Senses, Elizabeth Foundation for the Arts, New York (2018).
- In Search of Miss Ruthless, Para Site, Hong Kong (2017).
- Survival Kit 9, the Latvian Centre for Contemporary Art, Riga, Latvia (2017).
- On Life’s Way, Oil Street, Hong Kong (2015).
- Bringing the World into the World, Queens Museum, New York (2014).
- The Ceiling Should Be Green, P!, NY (2013)

== Publications and reviews ==
=== Catalogues ===
- Magic Wands, Batons and DNA Splicers (2018), published by a.m.space, Hong Kong
- Wong Kit Yi: North Pole Future (2015), published by K., New York

=== Reviews ===
- Bailey, Stephanie. “Field Meeting Take 6: Thinking Collections,” Ocula, Feb 1, 2019.
- Chu, Chloe. “Profile of Wong Kit Yi,” ArtAsiaPacific, issue 110, Sept/Oct, 2018.
- Chan, Hera. “A Lifetime Guaranteed: Based on the Works of Wong Kit Yi,” LEAP (English), May 29, 2018.
- Chan, Hera. “Inevitable Immortality—Magic Wands, Batons and DNA Splicers,” LEAP (Chinese), May 11, 2018.
- Tsui, Enid. “Art Basel in Hong Kong: city’s small galleries shine through with memorable displays,” South China Morning Post, April 4, 2018.
- Basu, Chitralekha (March 30, 2018). "Fair Value for Viewers". ChinaDaily.
- Gaskin, Sam. “Art021 and West Bund Art & Design wrestle for dominance,” Ocula, Nov 17, 2017.
- Kafka. “In Search of Miss Ruthless,” Hong Kong Economic Journal, Aug 15, 2017.
- Cheung, Karen. “In Search of Miss Ruthless,” ArtAsiaPacific, Aug 2017.
- Tsui, Enid. “Hong Kong art show on beauty pageants, In Search of Miss Ruthless, explores themes surrounding the contests,” South China Morning Post, July 26, 2017.
- Tsang, Hiu Ling. “In Search of Miss Ruthless,” Ming Pao, July 7, 2017.
- Duffy, Owen. “Wong Kit Yi at P!, New York,” ArtReview, May 2017.
- Brokaw-Falbo, Harper. “Wong Kit Yi // Futures, Again // P!, New York,” Dissolve, April 19, 2017.
- “Wong Kit Yi at P!,” Contemporary Art Daily, April 10, 2017.
- Wong, Mimi. “Futures, Again,” ArtAsiaPacific, April 3, 2017.
- White, Roger. “Sightlines,” Art in America, February 2017.
- Helmke, Juliet. “Next Stop, Svalbard!” Modern Painters, July/August 2015.
- “Wheel of philanthropic fortune,” The Art Newspaper, May 16, 2015.
- “Wong Kit Yi at K,” Art in America, April 30, 2015.
- Salemy Mohammad. “Can Financialization Offer art an Exit from Contemporary Art,” e-flux, April 9, 2015.
- Tan, Berny. “Ali Wong and Wong Kit Yi: Every System Breaks,” Asymptote, Feb 1, 2015.
- Smith, Roberta. “If Seeing Is Believing, a Panorama of Truth,” New York Times, June 19, 2014.
- Morgan, Robert. “The Ceiling Should Be Green at P! Gallery,”Asian Art News, March/April 2014.
- The Ceiling Should Be Green: A Conversation with Wong Kit Yi and Mel Bochner,” Asia Art Archive in America, Dec 19, 2013.
- Dawson, Jessica. “Feng Shui Curating at P!,” Art in America, November 8, 2013.
