= Umber Majeed =

American visual artist (born 1989)

- Born: 1989 (age 36–37); New York
- Known for: Animation art
- Website: www.umbermajeed.com

Umber Majeed (born 1989) is an American visual artist who lives and works in New York City and Lahore, Pakistan. Majeed's work has been included in group exhibitions at international venues such as at apexart in New York, the Karachi Biennale, and the Queens Museum in New York. Her work is also in private collections such as the Lekha and Anupam Poddar Collection at the Devi Art Foundation in Gurgaon, India. A solo exhibition took place at the Rubber Factory in New York in 2018.
