= Gayatri Sinha =

Indian art critic and curator

Gayatri Sinha is an Indian art critic and curator based in New Delhi, India. Her primary areas of research are around the structures of gender and iconography, media, economics and social history. She founded Critical Collective, a forum for thinking about conceptual frames within art history and practice in contemporary India.

She has worked as an art critic for The Indian Express (1981–1991), The Telegraph (1991–1994) and The Hindu (1995–2006).

== Early life and education ==
Sinha graduated in English Literature and Economics from Calcutta University with a postgraduate qualification in Media Studies, Social Psychology and Critical Appreciation from Sophia Polytechnic College.

== Curatorial projects ==
- Kali: Reverence & Rebellion, DAG, New Delhi: February - March 2024, Mumbai: August - October 2024.
- Erasure, Birla Academy, Kolkata, December 2019 - February 2020.
- Moving Still: Performative Photography in India, co-curated by Diana Freundl and Gayatri Sinha, Vancouver Art Gallery April - September, 2019.
- Part Narratives, Dr Bhau Daji Lad Museum, Mumbai, August - September, 2017.
- Part Narratives, Bikaner House, New Delhi, January 2017.
- Diary Entries with Nilima Sheikh, Sheba Chhachhi, Paula Sengupta, Benitha Perciyal and Hemali Bhuta, Gallery Espace, New Delhi, January 2016.
- Visiting Professor, Jawaharlal Nehru University, New Delhi, Lady Shri Ram College, New Delhi and Dr Bhau Daji Lad Museum, Mumbai.
- The Missing Pavilion, Jawaharlal Nehru University, New Delhi, 2014.
- Water, Grand Curtius Museo, Ansembourg, City of Liege, 2013.
- Ideas of Sublime Lalit Kala Akademi, April 2013.
- Convenor, Speakers' Forum, India Art Fair, New Delhi, 2013.
- Peak Shift Effect, Vadehra Art Gallery, January 2013.
- Cynical Love: Life in the Everyday, Kiran Nadar Museum of Art, Noida, Delhi, 2012.
- Window in the Wall: India and China – Imaginary Conversations, Pearl Lam Fine Art, Shanghai, China, September 2011.
- Fabular Bodies: New Narratives in the Art of the Miniature, Harmony Art Foundation, Prince of Wales Museum, Mumbai, August 2011.
- Tolstoy Farm: Archive of Utopia, Lalit Kala Akademi, New Delhi, April 2011; Times of India by Neelam Raj.
- Looking Glass: The Existence of Difference (Religare Arts Initiative, Max Mueller Bhavan, British Council), October 2010.
- Constructed Realities, Guild Art Gallery, Mumbai, July 2010.
- Convenor, Speakers' Forum, India Art Fair, New Delhi, 2009.
- Failed Plot, Korean International Art Fair, Seoul, September 2009.
- Purple Wall Project, India Art Summit, Delhi, August 2009.
- Bapu – On Gandhi in Contemporary India, Saffronart, Mumbai, January 2009.
- Mutant Beauty, Anant Art Gallery, Noida, 2008.
- Faultlines – Zarina Hashmi, Dayanita Singh, Manisha Parekh, Bodhi Art, Mumbai, 2008.
- Public Places, Private Spaces: Contemporary Photography and Video Art in India, co-curated by Paul Sternberger and Gayatri Sinha, The Newark Museum, New Jersey (September 2007). Minneapolis Institute of Arts, US (2008) *
- Frame/Grid/Room/Cell, Bodhi Art, Mumbai 2007.
- I fear, I believe, I desire, an exhibition of video installation, photography, sculpture and painting, Gallery Espace, New Delhi 2007.
- Watching Me Watching India, Contemporary photography in India, Fotographie Forum, Frankfurt (co-curator, Celina Lunsford) 2006. *
- Middle Age Spread Imaging India 1947–2004, National Museum, New Delhi, 2004.
- Frame/Grid/Room/Cell, Bodhi Art, Mumbai 2007.
- After Dark, Sakshi gallery, Mumbai, March, 2004.
- Cinema Still, Apparao galleries, New Delhi, 2002.
- In Conversation - an exhibition of artists’ sketch books, Gallery Espace, September, 2001.
- Vilas: The Idea of Pleasure, Birla Academy, Mumbai, December, 2000.
- The Self and the World - The Festival of India in Bangladesh, National Gallery of Modern Art, New Delhi 1997.
- The Self and the World Women artists at the National Gallery of Modern Art, April, 1997.

== Photography and video exhibitions ==
- Envisioning Asia: Gandhi and Mao in the photographs of Walter Bosshard, co-curated by Gayatri Sinha and Peter Pfrunder, from the collection of Fotostiftung Schweiss, Kiran Nadar Museum of Art, New Delhi, Navjeevan gallery, Ahmedabad, Dr. Bhau Daji Lad Museum, Mumbai, Volkekundemuseum, Heidelberg, between September 2018 - September 2019.
- Video Art at the Bhau Daji Lad Museum, Mumbai, 2014-2015.
- Video Wednesdays II, Gallery Espace, New Delhi, September 2011- August 2012.
- Public Places, Private Spaces, Contemporary Photography and Video Art in India, co-curated by Paul Sternberger and Gayatri Sinha, The Newark Museum, New Jersey (September 2007). Minneapolis Institute of Arts, US (2008).
- Watching Me Watching India, Contemporary photography in India, Fotographie Forum, Frankfurt (co-curator, Celina Lunsford) 2006.
- Kashmir, A Passage in Time for the Ministry of Information and Broadcasting, Government of India at New Delhi, 2005, on 50 years of Kashmiri social history.
- Middle Age Spread Imaging India 1947–2004, National Museum, New Delhi, 2004.
- Woman/Goddess 1999-2000, Delhi, Bombay, Bangalore, Calcutta, Chennai, and New York 2001.

== Publications ==
- Kali: Reverence & Rebellion, DAG, New Delhi, 2024.
- Points of View: Defining Moments of Photography in India (ed.) Kiran Nadar Museum of Art, New Delhi, 2022.
- The Archival Gaze : A Timeline of Photography in India 1840-2020 (ed.) Kiran Nadar Museum of Art, New Delhi, 2022.
- Cartographic Necessities: Contemporary Practices and the Making of a Brave New World, published in In Flux - Contemporary Art in Asia (ed. Parul Dave Mukherjee, Naman P. Ahuja, Kavita Singh, Sage Publications, New Delhi, 2013).
- Voices of Change: 20 Indian Artists (ed. Marg Publications, 2010).
- Art and Visual Culture in India 1857-2007 (ed. Marg Publications, Bodhi Art, National Culture Fund, 2009).
- India Public Places Private Spaces Contemporary Photography and Video Art, co-authored with Paul Sternberger. Marg / The Newark Museum, USA 2007.
- Krishen Khanna: Images in my Time Mapin Publishing and Lund Humphries, UK, 2007.
- Himmat Shah: An Unreasoned Act of Being Mapin and Lund Humphries, 2007.
- Krishen Khanna : The Embrace of Love, Mapin, 2005.
- The Art of Adimoolam, Mapin, 2004.
- Indian art: An Overview. A collection of 15 essays, 1850-2000 (ed.) Rupa books, 2003.
- A Critical Biography of Krishen Khanna, Vadehra Art Gallery, 2002.
- Expressions and Evocations: Contemporary Women Artists of India, (ed.) Marg Publications, 1996.
- The Other Self, The National Gallery of Modern Art, India; Stedelijk Museum / Bureau Amsterdam, the Netherlands, 1996.
- Cinema Still: Apparao Gallery, India Habitat Centre, March 2002.
- Vilas – The Idea of Pleasure, Birla Academy, Mumbai, 2000

== Essays ==
- Nation as Exhibit: The Long Shadow of T.N. Mukharji, Critical Collective, 2024.
- Karbala And Other Symbols — MF Husain, The Rooted Nomad: MF Husain, Kiran Nadar Museum of Art, New Delhi, 2024.
- A Fine Line: The Still and Shifting Lens in Contemporary Indian Photography essay in India/Contemporary Photographic and New Media Art, ed. Steven Evans & Sunil Gupta, Fotofest. inc., Houston, Texas, USA, Schilt Publishing, Amsterdam, NL, 2018.
- Nilima Sheikh - "Nilima Sheikh: Terrain," Gallery Espace & Gallery Chemould, 2017.
- Madhvi Parekh – “There is no end”, DAG Modern, 2017
- Jagannath Panda : The Artist as Custodian, Vadehra Art Gallery, 2017.
- Atul Dodiya: Girlfriends: French, German, Italian, Egyptian, Santiniketan, Ghatkopar..., New Delhi, Vadehra Art Gallery, 2017
- Dhruvi Acharya – Is it all just in my mind?, Gallery Chemould, 2016.
- Arc Silt Dive: The works of Sheba Chhachhi, Tulika Books, 2016 (Essays by Kumkum Sangari, Gayatri Sinha and Nancy Adajania).
- Looking In/Looking Out: Contemporary Indian Photography from the Gaur Collection. Massachusetts College of Art and Design, 2016. Essay: Return of the Gaze - Indian Photography in Cosmopolitan Contexts.
- Voyage of Discovery, ed. Fred Moody. Essays by Sumathi Ramaswamy, Daniel Herwitz, Gayatri Sinha et al., 2015.

== Awards ==
- Tate Research Fellowship, 2017-2018.
- University of Sussex and the London Institute, Project Art Modernity and Nationalism India, Japan and Mexico, 1860-1940 [2002-2004].
- Ford Foundation award for Women/Goddesses, 1998–2000.
- Senior Fellowship by the Department of Culture for a critical biography on the artist Krishen Khanna (1995–1997).
- Department of Culture award for Representation of the Divine Feminine in Himachali Painting and Sculpture (1995).
