= Vasudeo S. Gaitonde =

Indian painter (1924–2001)

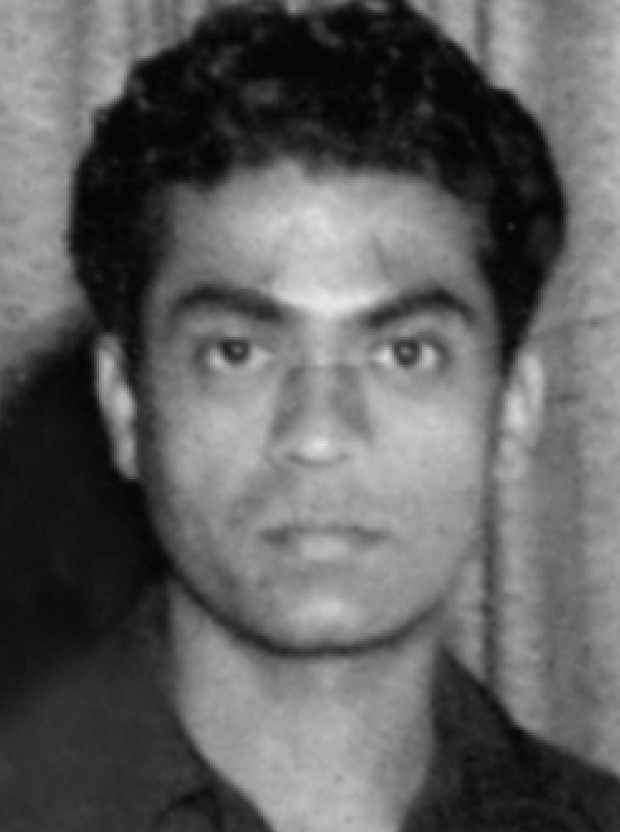
- Gaitonde in an undated photograph
- Born: c. 1924; Nagpur, British India
- Died: 10 August 2001 (aged 76–77)
- Citizenship: British Raj (until 1947); India (from 1947)
- Education: Sir J. J. School of Art
- Known for: Abstract painting
- Movement: Abstract expressionism
- Awards: Rockefeller Fellowship (1964); Padma Shri (1971); Kalidas Samman (1989)

Vasudeo Santu Gaitonde (1924 – 10 August 2001), also known as V. S. Gaitonde, was an Indian painter. He was regarded as one of India's foremost abstract painters. Gaitonde received the Padma Shri by the Government of India in 1971.

== Early life and education ==
Gaitonde was born in 1924, in Nagpur, British India, to Goan parents. He completed his art diploma at Sir J. J. School of Art in 1948, and in 1950 was invited to join the influential Bombay Progressive Artists' Group.

== Career ==
Impressed by his work, Gaitonde was invited to join the Progressive Artists Group of Bombay formed in 1947 by artists like Francis Newton Souza and S. H. Raza and Maqbool Fida Husain. He actively participated in the activities of the group. He had several exhibitions held in India as well as in foreign countries.

In 1956, Gaitonde participated in the Indian art exhibition, which was held in Eastern European countries. He also participated in other group exhibitions held at the Graham Art Gallery, New York, in 1959 and 1963. Gaitonde's abstract works are produced in many Indian and overseas collections including the Museum of Modern Art, New York.

In 1957, Gaitonde was awarded the first prize at the Young Asian Artists Exhibition, Tokyo and the Rockefeller Fellowship followed in 1964. In 1971, he was awarded the Padma Shri by the Government of India.

== Personal life ==
Gaitonde lived and worked in Nizamuddin East area of Delhi, and died in 2001, in obscurity.

== Style ==
″A quiet man and a painter of the quiet reaches of the imagination" as one of his admirers once called him, defines Gaitonde best, who has the appearance of an intellectual, literally simmering with some unexplored thought. Conceptually, he never considered himself an abstract painter and is averse to be called one. In fact he asserts that there is no such thing as abstract painting, instead he refers to his work as "non-objective" a kind of personalised hieroglyphics and calligraphic inventions, evoking the surface painted on with the most astounding intuitions, which he has realised in his inevitable meeting, in discovering Zen. The meditative Zen quality that transpires his speech, emoting silence is exemplified in his work best, as silence is eternal and meaningful in itself, from this point one does tend to identify the mysterious motifs, the highly personalised hieroglyphs in Gaitonde's canvasses with the manifestation of intuitions, invested in their His work is influenced by Zen philosophy and ancient calligraphy.

== Legacy ==
V. S. Gaitonde was the first Indian contemporary painter whose work was sold for ₹9 million (US$93,000) at a 2005 Osians art auction in Mumbai. In 2013, one of Gaitonde's untitled painting sold for ₹237 million (US$2.5 million), set a record for an Indian artist at Christie's debut auction in India. After the media reports of the auction interest in his work has grown, even at his birthplace Nagpur, where his painting till then lying at warehouse of Central Museum, Nagpur was sent for restoration. It was put on public display in January 2014.

In October 2014, the first retrospective of his work took place at the Solomon R. Guggenheim Museum in New York, titled V. S. Gaitonde: Painting as Process, Painting as Life.

== Exhibitions ==
- 1949 Progressive Art Group Exhibition, Bombay Art Society Salon, Bombay.
- 1956 Indian Art Exhibition, Eastern Europe.
- 1957 5,00 Years of Indian Art, Essex.
- 1957 Young Asian Artists, Tokyo.
- 1958, 59, 63 Group shows in London and New York.
- 1965 Solo exhibition in New York.
- 1966, 67, 70, 73, 74, 77, 80 Solo exhibition in Bombay.
- 1982 Contemporary Indian Art at the Festival of India, London.
- 2014 V. S. Gaitonde: Painting as Process, Painting as Life, Solomon R. Guggenheim Museum in New York.

== Collections ==
- National Gallery of Modern Art, New Delhi.
- Lalit Kala Akademi, New Delhi.
- Tata Institute of Fundamental Research, Mumbai.
- Museum of Modern Art, New York.
- Pundole Art Gallery, Mumbai.
- Progressive Art Gallery, New Delhi.
- Mr. Bal Chhabda, Mumbai.
- Jehangir Nicholson Collection, Mumbai, (Prince of Wales Museum)

== Awards ==
- 1950 Silver Medal, Bombay Art Society, Bombay.
- 1957 Young Asian Artists Award, Tokyo.
- 1971 Padma Shri by Government of India
- 1964–65 Rockefeller Fellowship, USA
- 1989–90 Kalidas Samman, Government of Madhya Pradesh

== List of major works ==
- Homi Bhabha Study – 1959
