= ArtAsiaPacific =

Magazine about contemporary art

Artasiapacific
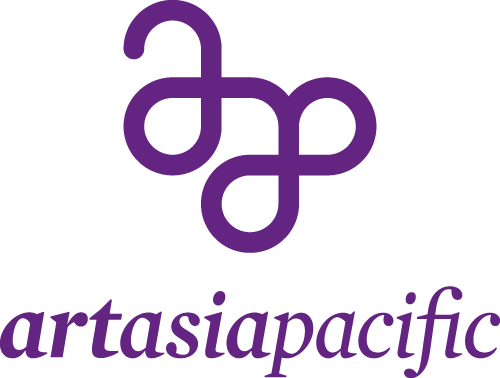

- Issue no. 50, Fall 2006
- Editor and Publisher: Elaine W. Ng
- Categories: Art magazine
- Frequency: Monthly
- First issue: June 1993
- Company: ArtAsiaPacific Publishing LLC
- Country: Australia, United States, Hong Kong
- Language: English
- Website: artasiapacific.com
- ISSN: 1558-8904

ArtAsiaPacific is the longest running English-language periodical solely dedicated to covering contemporary art and culture from sixty-seven countries, territories, and Chinese Special Administrative Regions that it considers to be within Asia, the Pacific, and the Middle East. It is published six times a year and is distributed internationally. A regular issue includes feature-length articles on artists, themes or events; essays; profiles on artists or collectors; reviews of biennials, exhibitions, art publications and films; news including obituaries and appointments; auction and art fair reports; and previews of shows.

ArtAsiaPacific produces an annual almanac edition, published in January, which surveys the past year in the 67 countries and territories covered in the magazine. In addition to news, exhibition, festival and country reports, the almanac includes reports on five outstanding artists from the previous year and one promising artist for the next year, and essays written by prominent curators and cultural figures.

== History ==
The magazine first launched as Art and Asia Pacific in March 1993 in Australia. Published quarterly, it began more as an academic journal than a standard consumer magazine and each issue would focus on a different country or theme. The first issues were published by Fine Arts Press (the publisher of Art and Australia) and the first four issues were provided free to readers of Art and Australia magazines in March, June, September and December 1993. The first two issues were published by Janet Gough and edited by Dinah Dysart. The first issue lists Alison Carroll as Guest Editor and the second issue lists John Clark. The third and fourth issues list Dinah Dysart as both publisher and editor.

The March 1993 issue lists subscription rates and single issue prices on page 3, however, the June and September 1993 do not mention subscription rates but states 'ART and AsiaPacific' is a journal accompanying Art and Australia and is not to be sold separately' on page 3. The December 1993 issue lists subscription rates and single issue prices on page 3. While the March 1993 issue is listed as Volume 1 No 1 on page 3, the June and September issues do not list them as being Vol 1 No 2 or 3, they are only identified by the date. It is not clear if the March 1993 issue was ever sold separately.

Confusingly, the December 1993 issue is also listed as being Volume 1 No 1 on page 3 and the front cover states 'Inaugural Issue'. Presumably this issue was released for general sale which might explain the decision to promote it as the 'Inaugural Issue' and designate it as Vol 1 No 1.

It was then purchased by Gang Zhao and Wendy Siegelman and moved to New York.

In the fall of 2004, Elaine W. Ng took over as editor-in-chief, and eventually purchased and co-published the magazine along with author Simon Winchester in March 2005, effectively re-launching it under the slogan "Today's Art From Tomorrow's World." This marked a dramatic movement in the magazine's design and focus; the editorial content became more journalistic and reader-friendly. In 2006, the first almanac edition of the magazine was released with the goal of covering the past year in Asian art and culture along with profiles and informational listings of each of the 67 countries covered by the magazine.

As of January 2007, Elaine W. Ng is the sole publisher and editor-in-chief of the magazine. Formerly, produced in an office in the gallery district of Manhattan's Chelsea neighborhood, the magazine moved production to Hong Kong in 2011.

== List of notable contributors ==
A number of important figures within the contemporary art world have contributed to ArtAsiaPacific, including:

- Takashi Murakami
- Alexandra Munroe
- Uli Sigg
- Ai Weiwei
- Hou Hanru
- Rirkrit Tiravanija
- Cai Guo-Qiang
- Christopher Doyle
- Ranjit Hoskote
- Jack Persekian
- Arto Lindsay
- Baiju Parthan
- Michael Shaowanasai
- Nancy Adajania
- Amanda McDonald Crowley
- Rhana Devenport
- Lee Yongwoo
- Ahmed Mater

== Notable cover appearances ==
Each issue of ArtAsiaPacific features work by a different artist, designer, or architect. Many of these featured artists have had their work appear on an ArtAsiaPacific cover long before they achieved wider international recognition, including:

- Zhang Xiaogang – Chinese painter, creator of renowned "Bloodlines" series (Vol. 3 No. 1, 1996)
- Atul Dodiya – Indian painter (No. 33)
- Ai Weiwei – Chinese sculptor, performance artist, curator and architect; co-designer of the Beijing National Stadium (No. 40, Spring 2004)
