= Desire Machine Collective =

Culture of Assam

Desire Machine Collective is a group of media practitioners based in Guwahati, in the state of Assam in India. Collaborating since 2004 as Desire Machine Collective, Sonal Jain and Mriganka Madhukaillya employ film, video, sound, space, photography and objects in their installations and works. Their use of experimental techniques and the political character of their narratives have contributed to their growth as one of the leading artist collaboratives in India's contemporary art scene.

Their works have been showcased at some major international festivals and renowned museums. They were a part of the inaugural Indian Pavilion at the 54th International Art exhibition of the Venice Biennale and nominated for the LUMA award. Their artworks have been exhibited at the Solomon Guggenheim Museum New York and the Deutsche Guggenheim in Berlin.

== History ==
Sonal Jain is a fine arts graduate from the Maharaja Sayajirao University of Vadodara, Gujarat, India. She subsequently served as a faculty member in Communication Design at the National Institute of Design in Ahmedabad, India. Mriganka Madhukaillya received a degree in physics from Fergusson College in Pune and completed his postgraduate work in film and video at the National Institute of Design. He currently teaches at IIT Guwahati. Their similar concerns and ideas of the nation, the centre-periphery divide and issues like fascism and globalization, led them to negotiate these complex spaces through art.

== Influences and Art ==
Assuming their name and theoretical disposition from Anti-Oedipus: Capitalism and Schizophrenia, a seminal text from 1972 by French philosopher Gilles Deleuze and psychoanalyst Félix Guattari, Desire Machine Collective seeks to disrupt the neurotic symptoms that arise from constricting capitalist structures with healthier, schizophrenic cultural flows of desire and information. Their primary aim is to ‘confront the many forms of fascism that lead to violence and injustice through their practice, both regionally in Guwahati, Assam, and around the world’. Desire Machine Collective attempts to move beyond a form that is representative and deal with complexities of image construction which deals with image as perception, time and location. They attempt to free the perception from being bound to a single standpoint and immobile eye, thereby challenging the ‘Renaissance perspectival stable view of the viewer looking out of the window, which creates an absolute distinction between the grounded viewer and the world in flux out there brought to focus from this point of grounded vision.’

Their earlier works addressed their interest in explorations into image and representations. ‘25/75’ reveals a world governed by numbers. These numbers are arrived at through dreams and the interpretation of dreams according to a system developed in the realm of the oral cultures of a particular community of people. The title alludes to "Teer" (arrow), a game of betting on numbers, based on the number of arrows that hit a small target. It is a traditional game of archery played in the Khasi Hills, of Meghalaya, Northeast India. Dreams here have a symbolism and bets are made on specific numbers based on the dreams of the previous night.

They have a penchant for creating alternate spaces for art, as evidenced by ‘Periferry’, an alternative artist-led residency programme space situated on the MV Chandardinga, a ferry docked in the Brahmaputra River in Guwahati. Periferry serves as a laboratory in flux for generating innovative practices in contemporary film and video. The space and its activities also provide a connective platform for dialogues across artistic, scientific, technological, and ecological modes of production and knowledge. As an extension of Periferry, in 2011, they introduced A+ type, an artist residency programme situated in the city of Guwahati itself.

Some of their projects that have widely circulated are ‘Trespassers will (not) be prosecuted’ (2008), ‘Nishan I ’ (2007) and ‘Residue’ (2011). ‘Trespassers will (not) be prosecuted’ is an audio installation consisting of sounds from a ‘sacred forest’ in Meghalaya. This work explores the realm of dematerialisation and transience. False memories (of a forest) are instilled in the audience's mind and the work has a life after the installation is over. This soundscape was installed in a public space with subliminal notions of memory, ecology, and geography experienced aurally thereby reclaiming it and rendering it dynamic. It acts as an intangible intervention into time and space. By installing it on the Deutsche Guggenheim's façade, Desire Machine Collective asked whether sound can be regarded as a material thing since, according to local belief, it's forbidden to take out any object from Meghalaya's sacred forest. The 39 minutes film, ‘Residue’, has images of a disused thermal power plant near Guwahati that's gradually being swallowed up by the surrounding forest. It highlights their interest in studying the dynamics between machinery, nature and the relationship between images and how they are perceived. It also deals with the cyclical process of creation, destruction and memory and how it is replaced. They first showed ‘Residue’ in 2010 at the Deutsche Guggenheim and at the Lyon Museum in France, Venice biennale and Paris triennial. ‘Nishan I’ was shot in Srinagar, Kashmir. It is a 4-channel audio-video installation with 4 channels of sound. ‘Nishan I’ registers the interior spaces of abandoned houses that bereft of their primary functions serve as bunkers for the army, with traces of the absences that are repressed within them. The window determines the relation with the world and this relates to the split between the interior and exterior, the ego and the gaze, public and private. Through this work, Desire Machine Collective looks at sensory and perceptual states that result from a disruption of ‘organic flows’, the point of departure being a state of sustained conflict and the conditions it produces. It has been exhibited at Solomon R. Guggenheim Museum, New York. Their latest work is titled, ‘Noise Life’. More personal than other works by them, the piece points to excessive states of perception occurring in exceptional experiences of blindness or deafness. The work overwhelms the viewer with a chaos of sensations, and attempts to convey how we make complex sense of our lives and express our experiences. Some of their other works are Almost Normal (2005), Alfa Beta (2005), Daily Checkup (2005), About Body Borders (2006), Aliyah (2006), Passage ( 2006), Untitled ( 2007) and 30/12 (2009).

== Exhibitions ==
Desire Machine Collective had their first solo exhibition Noise Life(2014) at Project88, Mumbai. DMC has presented their work in numerous group exhibitions including Being Singular Plural, Solomon Guggenheim Museum, New York City (2012), Intense Proximity, 3rd edition of the La Triennale, Palais de Tokyo, Paris (2012), Everyone Agrees: It’s About to Explode, 54th International Art Exhibition of the Venice Biennale, India Pavilion, Venice (2011), Indian Highway IV, MAC Muséed’Art Contemporain de Lyon and Indian Highway V, MAXXI Museo Nazionale delle Arti del XXI Secolo, Rome (2011). Here is the complete list:

=== 2016 ===
- "Invocation" - Krishna in the Garden of Assam - British Museum, London. Invocation is a celebration in silence of the vitalism of the psychical world through observations that dissolve the physical, mental and emotional "individual self" into larger and more potent entities. It also explores the links Assam had with Tibet several hundred years ago. Ancient silk cloth from Assam centrepiece of UK exhibition assam/ Exhibition to explore the rich cultural history of Assam Weft & wrap of Assam History Amar Asom

=== 2015 ===
- Residue - The Eight Asia Pacific Triennial of Contemporary Art, Brisbane Australia, November 2015
- Noise Life I - After Midnight: Indian Modernism to Contemporary India 1947/1997 at the Queens Museum and Grey Art Gallery at New York University both in New York City, March 2015
- Cut the Sky - media and visual concept by DMC for Marrugeku Australia
- World Premiere at Perth International Arts Festival, Subiaco, Australia; WOMADelaide, Adelaide
- Remote tour in Australia - The Boardwalk Theatre, Mandurah, Pigram Garden Theatre, Broome, Mowanjum Art and Culture Centre, Ardyaloon Community
- EUROPEAN TOUR 2015 - Theater Im Pfalzbau, Ludwidshafen, Germany, Les Théâtres de la Ville de, Luxembourg, Royal Flemish Theatre, Brussels, Belgium
- Cut the Sky
- Noise Life - production and exhibition platform basis e.V. Frankfurt, Germany
- Residency at Gasworks, London, UK, 2015. Working with film, video, photography and multimedia installation, Desire Machine Collective (Sonal Jain and Mriganka Madhukaillya) explore the relations between power, nature and society. Their recent work focuses on the disruption or interruption of ‘organic flows’ of goods, ideas and people across interconnected local and global economies, cultures, and environments. This interest is informed by the artists’ position of in-betweenness, both geographically (as they live and work in Guwahati in eastern India) and from a formal and aesthetic perspective. During their residency at Gasworks, they will develop two new projects, ‘As1924, 1210.8’ and ‘Two Rivers’. ‘As1924, 1210.8’, which refers to an access number in the British Museum archives, will focus on the life of the self-taught English anthropologist, ethnologist and tribal activist Verrier Elwin. Elwin began his career as a Christian missionary in India in the 1920s, but abandoned the clergy to work with Gandhi and the Indian National Congress, eventually converting to Hinduism in 1935. The second work, ‘Two Rivers’, will look at the shared history of two rivers – the Brahmaputra in Guwahati, Assam and the Thames in London – focusing on how the legacy of colonialism continues to affect their social and economic use.
- Nominated for Visible Award 2015, Tate Liverpool. The project Periferry serves as a point of departure for specific regional and historic concerns that find common ground. The project is located on a ferry, MV Chandradinga, made in 1978. The Brahmaputra River is a trans-national river. It begins in Tibet, where it is known as the Tsangpo, flows through India where it is called the Brahmaputra, through Bangladesh where it is known as the Jamuna and then Padma before flowing into the Bay of Bengal. In a region which lies between two major land masses, South and Southeast Asia, fluxes and migration have been the only constant and identity is not a given. It is ever-changing and needs to be revisited and re-negotiated constantly, especially in the context of the inter-ethnic space. Periferry creates a network space for negotiating the challenge of contemporary cultural production, which has become a necessary component of organising social action. Working with multi-use spaces and structures that are adaptable, it has appropriated a redundant and dysfunctional space. In a state of disuse, space becomes liminal and opens up to new interpretations; this leads to the emergence of what Foucault calls ‘heterotopias’. Foucault describes the ship as the ultimate ‘heterotopia’, a fragment of space that contests or compensates for the spaces we usually live in. The project is rooted in the community context and lays emphasis on participation, dialogue, and action. It provides a connective platform for dialogue across artistic, scientific, technological, and ecological modes of production and knowledge.
- Frieze Art Fair, London

== Online Journals ==
‘Evoking Bodies, Questioning the Nation: Critical Cinema in India’ by Aparna Sharma chapter: An Arrested Eye: Trauma and Becoming in Desire Machine Collective’s Documentary Installations

Worldly Affiliations: Artistic Practice, National Identity, and Modernism in India, 1930-1990 - Professor Sonal Khullar at the University of Washington

Noise Life at project 88, Mumbai

NAMELESS HERE FOR EVERMORE, Khoj Studios, New Delhi

== Lectures ==
2013

- DEFAULT 13: Art, Cities and Regeneration master class organized by Ramdom (Lecce, Italy) in collaboration with Art hub Asia (Shanghai, China) and with the support of the Asia –Europe Foundation (ASEF), Arts Network Asia (ANA) and Trans Europe Halles (THE) as part of the programme.
- Creative Encounters: Cultural Partnerships between Asia and Europe
- Sovereign table, a lecture at New Museum, New York
- A lecture at flying circus, Yangon organized by Theatre works, Singapore.

2012

- Public studio and lecture at Solomon Guggenheim Museum, New York
- A conversation at Asia Art Archive, New York

2011

- A lecture performing at Microclima, Venezia as part of Venice Biennale collateral event

2010

- Presented at Bite size lectures organized by FoAM in Brussels
- Presented at March meeting organized by Sharjah Art Foundation, Sharjah.
- Exploring living spaces at Kamla Raheja Vidyanidhi Institute of Architecture, Mumbai

2009

- Artist's collective organized by Devi Art Foundation, New Delhi
- Unspeakably More: Naming, Deframing, lexicon for contemporary curatorship (Art after Space), KHOJ co-organizes this seminar in association with n.e.w.s

2008

- New media art organized by Mohile Parikh Centre, NCPA, Mumbai
