= Sudhir Patwardhan =

Indian painter

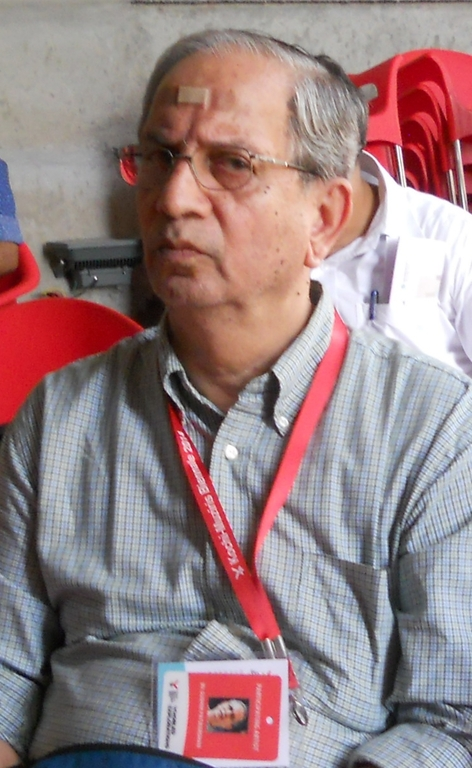
- Artist Sudhir Patwardhan at Kochi-Muziris Biennial 2014
- Born: Maharashtra, India
- Education: Armed Forces Medical College
- Occupation: Artist

Sudhir Patwardhan is an Indian contemporary painter and a practising radiologist.

== Early life ==
Patwardhan was born in Pune, Maharashtra in 1949. In 1972 he graduated in medicine from the Armed Forces Medical College, Pune. He moved to Mumbai in 1973 and worked as a radiologist from 1975 to 2000.

== Career ==
After 2005 he became a full-time artist. The city-scape features prominently in his canvases, and reflect the agonies of the urban middle class and poor. Patwardhan's works are in the permanent collection of National Gallery of Modern Art, New Delhi and Mumbai; Roopankar Museum, Bhopal; Kiran Nadar Museum of Art, New Delhi, Jehangir Nicholson Art Foundation, Mumbai; the Peabody Essex Museum, Salem, Massachusetts and other prominent private and public collections.

== Select Exhibitions (National and International) ==
- 'Aspects of Modem Indian Art' Oxford, U.K. 1982
- Contemporary Indian Art, festival of India, London, 1982
- Seven Indian Artists, Hamburg, West Germany, 1982
- Contemporary Indian Art, Festival of India, New York, 1985
- Festival of India, Center George Pompidou, Paris 1986
- 'Coupe de Coeur' Geneva, 1987
- 'Gadyaparva Exhibition' Gallery Chemould, Mumbai (1990), 'Parallel Perceptions', Sakshi Gallery, Mumbai (1993)
- 'Contemporary Indian Painting from the Herwitz Family Collection Part I, auction by Sotheby's, New York, USA (1995, 96)
- 'Contemporary Indian Painters 96' Jehangir Art Gallery, Mumbai 1996)
- 'Charcoal & Conte' Birla Century Art Gallery, Mumbai (1997), Icons of the Millennium (Lakeeren Art Gallery), Mumbai
- 'Extreme Gourmet' Indigo, Lakeeren, Mumbai and Century City, Tate Modern, London, UK (2001)
- 'Walking Through Soul City', National Gallery of Modern Art, Mumbai (2019)
