= Sudarshan Shetty =

Indian artist

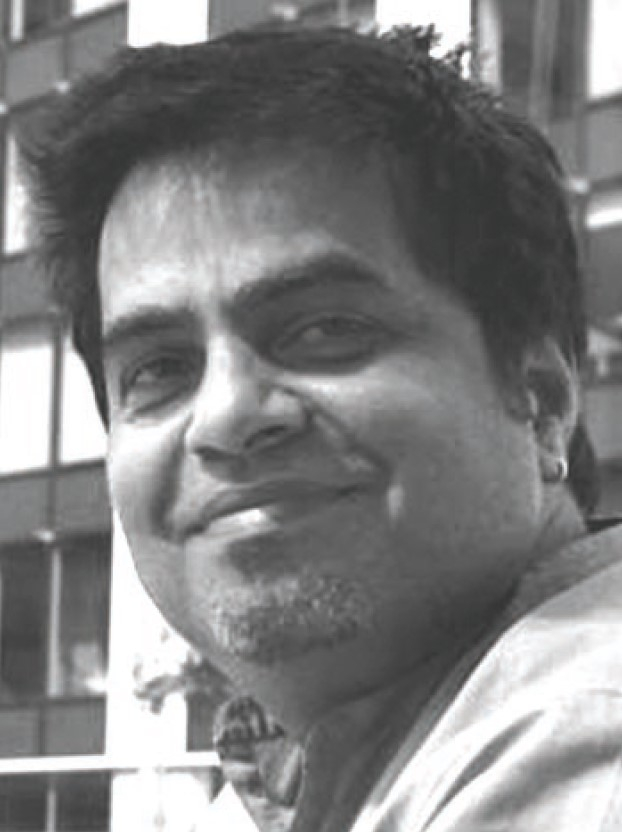
- Born: 1961 (age 64–65); Mangalore, India
- Education: Sir JJ School of Art, Mumbai
- Known for: Installation art, sculpture, video art and mixed media
- Notable work: Love, Flying Bus, The more I die the lighter I get, This too shall pass
- Movement: Contemporary art
- Awards: Ford Foundation Fellowship

Sudarshan Shetty (born 1961) is a contemporary Indian artist who has worked in painting, sculpture, installation, video, sound and performance. He has been a resident at the Mattress Factory, Pittsburgh, United States, and was a Ford Foundation Fellow at the New School for General Studies, New York.

In 1999, he was the only Indian artist commissioned to make a public sculpture (Home and Away) in Fukuoka, Japan, as a part of the Hakata Reverain Art Project, curated by Fumio Nanjo.

Among Shetty's solo shows are "The pieces earth took away " Galerie Krinzinger, Vienna (2012), " listen outside this house" at GALLERYSKE, Bangalore (2011), "Between the tea cup and a sinking constellation", Galerie Daniel Templon, Paris (2011), "this too shall pass" at Dr Bhau Daji Lad Museum, Mumbai (2010) and "The more I die the lighter I get", Tilton Gallery, New York (2010).

== Early years ==
Sudarshan Shetty was born in a Bunt family at Mangalore, India, in 1961. Though Shetty was born there, his family moved to Mumbai when he was six months old. Sudarshan Shetty's father, Adve Vasu Shetty, was himself a kind of artist, specifically a performer in Yakshagana. There was "a lot of music and singing in the house" where he grew up. Sudarshan Shetty trained in painting at the Sir JJ School of Art, Mumbai, during the late 1980s, but found himself increasingly attracted to the idioms of sculpture and installation. From 1989 to 1991, he worked at the Kanoria Centre for the Arts in Ahmedabad. There, he interacted closely with colleagues at the National Institute of Design and the Centre for Environmental Planning and Technology. Through these conversations, Shetty honed his knowledge of the relationship between sculpture, design and architecture. Shetty currently lives in Chembur, Mumbai.

== Art practice ==
Sudarshan Shetty's oeuvre has been defined mostly by large sculptural installations and multi-media works. Experimenting with innumerable materials and medium, his installations or assemblages use quotidian objects juxtaposed in an attempt to open up new possibilities of meaning. Eschewing straightforward devices of narrative and explicit symbolism and displaying a fascination for the mechanics of toys and mechanised objects, Shetty infuses domestic, essentially inert objects with new life. The world of everyday contraptions, objects (especially those from middle-class showcases, or shop-front show windows), continues to be reconfigured from moment to moment in his work.

He often uses simple, repetitive, mechanical movements and sound in kinetic works that explore aspects of temporality. Shetty says, "The ploy is to attract the viewer and then to disenchant them with the mechanical movement." These mechanical pieces together, with scenes of domestic interiority, are conceived to create places of amusement or what Shetty refers to as a 'fairground spectacle'. Things form a gaggle of actors, their movements become acts in a play.

"The idea is definitely to bring the activity of a marketplace to the fore. This is also a ploy to bring in a passerby into this arena – to seduce with the familiar."

Sudarshan's earlier concerns and themes evolved around the politics of absence or loss of body, of death, of 'being elsewhere'. The artist's preoccupation with absence or what he calls the 'philosophical absence of a physical body' was an inherent part of shows like Consanguinity (2003), Eight Corners of the World (2006) and Love (2006). 'I am interested in the idea of absence, a human absence, of being elsewhere. I think most of us are condemned to be elsewhere: I embrace this predicament and rejoice in it.'

With his recent shows, The more I die the lighter I get, and this too shall pass and for a few years preceding it, Sudarshan has become more absorbed with the ideas of futility and meaninglessness. Heightening notions of futility through repetitiveness, where mechanical shoes walk on and on, vessels fill and empty and coats dip in and out of liquids, there is artifice in the making of the work itself and in staging it where the object becomes the referential to the real event maybe distant in the viewer's memory of it. Transience and mortality are underlying themes in his recent works, where 'the compulsions of an engagement with the world and the resultant disenchantment are two sides of the same coin.' For Shetty, being part of the process and engaging with it are no longer seen as a choice because 'only through an exercised distance with it I may have a chance to arrive at some answers.'

"In setting-up of most of my shows, the artifice involved in 'staging' a show becomes an inherent part of the exercise. I am interested in playing out the fictional aspect in creating a sense of 'drama' or a 'spectacle', and at the same time, revealing the meaninglessness involved in doing so. And both these positions remain mutually inclusive and feed off each other in the work."

The use of the skeleton characterises several of Shetty's kinetic works. The skeletons represent the lost body and also evoke futility in their process of facture. The artist acquires an actual skeleton, takes it apart, makes a mould for each piece of bone, casts them all, and reassembles the skeleton in stainless steel. There is a certain futility in the painstaking procedure which is particularly the futility of art. Skeletons have featured in almost all of Shetty's shows in the last decade from the mechanical dinosaur making metallic love to a sports car (Love 2006) to the stilted bull in "The more I die the lighter I get" (2010) and the rocking skeleton of a horse in "This too shall pass" (2010).

Mumbai, is Shetty's main source of information and inspiration. Most of what he calls "the information for my work" comes, he says, "from my day-to-day negotiation with this city." The city provides the backdrop for his recordings of human life.

== Works ==
=== Paper Moon (1995) ===
His first important solo, Paper Moon, coincided with the shift between painting and sculpture that was taking place in Shetty's oeuvre.

=== Consanguinity (2003) ===
In 2003, the Bose Pacia Modern in New York opened the Habitat Visual Arts Center in New Delhi, where Shetty exhibited his major solo Consanguinity. The intersection between body and object is most clearly visible in Consanguinity, a show that was clearly an elegy for the absent body. Anthropomorphised objects formed the core of the show with bleeding trumpets, snapping scissors in a bathtub and eyeballs encased in glass jars. Blood and its multiple forms were repeatedly encountered in the nine exhibits, which explore the very proposition of human mortality.

=== Party is Elsewhere (2005) ===
In 2005, Shetty had a show called 'Party is Elsewhere', which was conceived for an anniversary party for a gallery space in a building that had been gutted by fire prior to the date. The relentless beating of two wooden hammers on two large tables with 365 empty wine glasses kept one in a state of constant alarm. There was violence in the noise and the fragility of the wine glasses was created. A neon sign in cursive writing cryptically announced: Party is Elsewhere.

=== Shift (2005) ===
In his 2005 show, Shift, he collaborated with architects Shantanu Poredi and Maneesha Aggarwal to produce a model of a collapsible building.

=== Love (2006) ===
Love, a GALLERYSKE show, which took place at Bodhi Art in Mumbai in 2006 had artist Baiju Parthan proclaim, "This show has raised the bar for Installation art in India." In an interview with Gopal Mirchandani, Shetty said, "The challenge was to use many accepted notions and images that come to be associated with the idea of love and work with them." The result is a skeletal steel dinosaur ceaselessly mating with a shiny Jaguar car.

=== Eight Corners of the World (2006) ===
Using objects that are ubiquitous and familiar, this show took place at GALLERYSKE in 2006. Eight Corners of the World, focused on the dynamic cosmos of domestic interiors and was one of Shetty's darker works, several elements of this complex installation suggest death. The repetitive movements of the animated constructions on display, combined with a medley of sounds, especially of flowing liquids and the mostly murky lighting created a world where the human figure was conspicuous by its absence.

=== Pure (2007) ===
In 2007, Pittsburgh's Mattress Factory hosted Shetty's Pure. Pure presented a miniature world system that maintains itself through a network of pumps, pipes and valves.

=== Leaving Home (2008) ===
Continuing his preoccupation with objects of domesticity, Leaving Home was a solo exhibition at Gallery Krinzinger in Vienna. "Leaving Home" was an ambitious, existential reflection on the human tendency to create things and devices that shape our lives.

=== Saving Skin (2008) ===
Saving Skin at the Tilton Gallery in 2008 was Shetty's first show in New York.

=== Six Drops (2009) ===
Six Drops, which was exhibited at GALLERYSKE in 2009, is a series of computer-generated inkjet prints on paper. The images have been set against a view of a hall at the Tate Modern. Drawing on Asian theologies, the six drops of the work's title refer to six enemies of the creative self: lust, anger, greed, delusion, pride and envy.

=== The House of Shades (2010) ===
Commissioned by Louis Vuitton for the Women's Fashion Week in Milan, The house of shades echoes the form of an airport kiosk, a glass enclosure that plays with the traditional architectural notion of inside outside.

=== This too shall pass (2010) ===
The first of a series of exhibitions planned by the museum through a residency program that invites eminent artists who have studied at the Sir J.J. School of Art.

=== Between the teacup and a sinking constellation (2011) ===
Shetty creates hybrids that explore the possible overlap between Indian and Western traditions. Addressing domestic preoccupations and the concept of movement, the show was characterised by duality- the teacup signifying the concerns of the present, while a sinking constellation refers to the transient nature of it all.

The focal point of the exhibition was a distorted automobile, handcrafted in wood. Slowly rotating, the car appears as an archaeological find, raising many questions about the accident and the civilisation that forged it.

=== Listen Outside This House (2011) ===
Shetty has stated that Listen Outside This House is built around the idea that words have a way of opening up a world of images and references that continually shift in their meaning and evocation.

The words highlight the duality of change and permanence, the absolute nothingness of everything, and the potential irrelevance of existence. The work in the show uses various objects- a dilapidated historical monument, pages from the Ramayana and the Mahabharata, a salvaged seasoned door to bring the artifice involved in setting up a show to the surface and to bring in a world view through the idea of words.

=== Flying Bus (2012) ===
Installed on the grounds of Maker Maxity in Bandra-Kurla Complex, Mumbai the Flying Bus, is a replica of a 1970s double-decker bus with two stainless steel wings attached on either side. The bus is positioned as if poised to take off. The work draws on themes of immigration, transit and living on the edge. A plaque beside the Bus states, "Sometimes when we travel we forget who we are." The Flying Bus is arguably India's most significant public art project.

=== The pieces earth took away (2012) ===
Shetty appropriates the notion of tradition and pairs it with recurrent themes in his practice of artifice or fabulation, to create a five-part installation on the act of mourning.

The work in the show bears references to the thirteen days of mourning in Hindu Rituals as well as heightens the contrast between the eternal cycle of reincarnation and the linear ephemerality of a domestic experience.

=== Path to Water (2013) ===
Presented by GALLERYSKE at the Art Feature Section of Art Basel, Path to Water consists of five hand-carved reliefs depicting two elephants in a jungle. Each bears an interpretation of a single line of poetry – "Bahut kathin hai dagar panghat ki," by Amir Khusrau, a celebrated 12/13th-century courtier, Sufi mystic, and musician. Path to Water continues Shetty's exploration of the ambiguity of meaning that an archaeological artefact implicitly contains, and the absence of fixity in language.

== Solo exhibitions ==
=== 2018 ===
Shoonya Ghar – Empty is this house, Unlimited, Art Basel, Basel, Switzerland

=== 2017 ===
Shoonya Ghar, Al Serkal, Dubai, United Arab Emirates

Shoonya Ghar, Dr. Bhau Daji Lad, Mumbai City Museum, Mumbai, India

=== 2016 ===
Shoonya Ghar, National Gallery of Modern Art, New Delhi

=== 2015 ===
Mimic Momento, Galerie Daniel Templon, Brussels

who must write these lines, GALLERYSKE, Bangalore

=== 2014 ===
every broken moment, piece by piece, GALLERYSKE, New Delhi

=== 2012 ===
The pieces earth took away, Galerie Krinzinger, Vienna

=== 2011 ===
Listen outside this house, GALLERYSKE, Bangalore

Between the teacup and a sinking constellation, Galerie Daniel Templon, Paris

=== 2010 ===
this too shall pass, Dr Bhau Daji Lad Museum, Mumbai

The more I die the lighter I get, Tilton Gallery, New York

=== 2009 ===
Untitled, Galerie Daniel Templon, Paris

Six Drops, GALLERYSKE, Bangalore

=== 2008 ===
Leaving Home, Gallery Krinzinger, Vienna

Saving Skin, Jack Tilton Gallery, New York

=== 2006 ===
Love, GALLERYSKE and Bodhi Art, Mumbai

=== 2005 ===
Eight corners of the world, GALLERYSKE, Bangalore

Shift, a collaborative architectural installation with Shantanu Poredi and Manisha Agarwal, Philips Contemporary, Mumbai

Party is elsewhere, Jamaat Art Gallery, Mumbai

=== 2004 ===
Statics, Chemould Gallery, Mumbai

=== 2003 ===
Consanguinity, Nature Morte, Bose Pacia Modern at the Habitat Visual Arts Centre, New Delhi

=== 2001 ===
For Here or To Go Installation at the Fukuoka Asian Art Museum, Fukuoka

=== 2000 ===
Lone Boat River Song, Spike Island, Bristol

=== 1996 ===
Paintings, Max Mueller Bhavan, Mumbai

=== 1995 ===
Paper Moon, Pundole Art Gallery and Framji Cawasjee Hall, Mumbai

Paper Moon, Ravindra Bhavan, New Delhi

=== 1991 ===
Spirit of India, Holland Art Gallery, Rotterdam, The Netherlands
