= T. V. Santhosh =

Indian artist based in Mumbai (born 1968)

- Born: 1968 (age 57–58); Kerala, India
- Education: Maharaja Sayajirao University of Baroda

T. V. Santhosh (born 1968 in Kerala) is an Indian artist based in Mumbai. He obtained his graduate degree in painting from Santiniketan and master's degree in Sculpture from M.S. University, Baroda. Santhosh has acquired a major presence in the Indian and International art scene over the last decade with several successful shows with international galleries and museums. His earlier works tackle global issues of war and terrorism and its representation and manipulation by politics and the media. Santhosh's sculptural installation "Houndingdown" was exhibited in Frank Cohen collection ‘Passage to India’. Some of his prominent museum shows are ‘Aftershock’ at Sainsbury Centre, Contemporary Art Norwich, England in 2007 and ’Continuity and Transformation’ show promoted by Provincia di Milano, Italy. He lives and works in Mumbai.

== Early life and education ==
Santhosh was born in 1968 at Trichur in Kerala, India. He started studying painting from 1989, starting at the Institute of Fine Arts in Trichur. Later at (1994 B.F.A in Sculpture) Kalabhavan, Santiniketan, West Bengal. He had completed his M.F.A (1997) in Sculpture at Faculty of Fine Arts, Maharaja Sayajirao University of Baroda.

== Museum shows ==
His major shows include the following:

- 2003 NGMA Annual Show, NGMA Mumbai.
- 2003 crossing generations: diVERGE, curated by Geeta Kapur & Chaitanya Sambrani, presented by Chemould Gallery, NGMA Mumbai.
- 2004 Zoom!: Art in Contemporary India, Curated by Nancy Adajania & Luis Serpa, Culturegest Lisbon.
- 2007 Lekha and Anupam Poddar Collection, New Delhi.
- 2007 After Shock, curated by Yasmin Canvin in collaboration with Sainsbury Centre Museum, Norwich
- 2007 Continuity and Transformation, Museum show, exhibition promoted by Provincia di Milano Italy.
- 2008 Where in the World, Devi Art Foundation, Delhi
- 2008 Passage to India, Part I: New Indian Art from the Frank Cohen Collection, at Initial Access, Wolverhampton, UK
- 2009 Passage to India, Part II: New Indian Art from the Frank Cohen Collection, at Initial Access, Wolverhampton, UK
- 2009 India Xianzai, MoCA, Shanghai, China.
- 2009 Dark Materials, curated by David Thorp, for GSK Contemporary, at Royal Academy of Arts, London.
- 2009–11 in-TRANSIT-ion, Vancouver Biennale
- 2010 The Empire Strikes Back, Saatchi Gallery, London.
- 2010 The Silk Road: New Chinese, Indian and Middle Eastern Art from The Saatchi Gallery, Tripostal, Lille, France.
- 2011 Crossroads: India Escalate, Prague Biennale 5
- 2011 Collectors’ Stage: Asian Contemporary Art from Private Collections, Singapore Art Museum, Singapore.
- 2011 In Transition New Art from India, Surrey Museum of Art, Canada
- 2011 Rewriting Worlds, curated by Joseph Backstein and Peter Weibel, 4th Moscow Biennale of Contemporary Art
- 2011 INDIA!, curated by Pieter Tjabbes and Tereza de Arruda, Centro Cultural Banco do Brasil in Rio de Janeiro, Brazil
- 2012 ÍNDIA- LADO A LADO, curated by Tereza de Arruda, SESC Belenzinho, Sao Paulo, Brazil
- 2012 Havana Biennale
- 2012 Critical Mass: Contemporary Art from India, curated by Tami Katz-Freiman and Rotem Ruff, Tel Aviv Museum of Art, Israel
- 2012 WAR ZONE: Indian Contemporary Art, Artemons Contemporary, Das Kunstmuseum, Hellmonsödt, Austria.
- 2013 Imagining the Past, Envisioning the Future, curated by Priya Pall, Heritage Transport Museum, Gurgaon, India
- 2014 Making History, Colombo Art Biennale
- 2015 The Great Game, National Pavilion of Iran, curated by Marco Meneguzzo, Mazdak Faiznia, 56th Venice Biennale
- 2016 forming in the pupil of an eye, Kochi-Muziris Biennale, curated by Sudarshan Shetty
- 2021 Lokame Tharavadu (the world is one family), curated by Bose Krishnamachari, Alappuzha, Kerala
- 2022–23 Freedom and Awakening, Kolkata Centre for Creativity, in collaboration with the Government of West Bengal, Kolkata
- 2023 Contextual Cosmologies, curated by Anushka Rajendran, Bose Krishnamachari, Premjish Achari and Sujit SN, College of Fine Arts, Thiruvananthapuram
- 2024 Dreams of Doom: Recent works of TV Santosh, for Bengal Biennale 2024, Krittika Arts Space, Santiniketan.

== Solo exhibitions ==
- 1997 At Faculty of Fine Arts Gallery, MSU, Baroda.
- 2003 One Hand Clapping/Siren, Jehangir Art Gallery Mumbai presented by The Guild, Mumbai.
- 2004 Unresolved Stories, Nature Morte Delhi, in collaboration with The Guild, Mumbai.
- 2005 False Promises, Grosvenor Gallery London, in collaboration with The Guild, Mumbai.
- 2006 Scars of an Ancient Error, Singapore Art Fair presented by The Guild, Mumbai.
- 2008 Countdown, Nature Morte Delhi, in collaboration with The Guild, Mumbai.
- 2008 A Room to Pray at Avanthay Contemporary, Zurich, in collaboration with The Guild, Mumbai.
- 2009 Living with a Wound, Solo Show, Grosvenor Vadehra, London in collaboration with The Guild.
- 2009–10 Blood and Spit. Solo Show, Jack Shainman Gallery in collaboration with The Guild.
- 2010 Burning Flags Solo Show, Aicon Gallery, London in collaboration with The Guild, Mumbai.
- 2011 The Land, Solo Show, Nature Morte, Berlin in collaboration with The Guild, Mumbai.
- 2014 Common Wall, Grosvenor Vadehra, London in collaboration with The Guild, Mumbai

== Key works ==
"The work titled, Houndingdown is a key installation that broadly reflects my conceptual and linguistic concerns of my recent engagements. It consists of thirty dogs and LED panels, is a combination of few historical references of ruthless and unforgivable deeds men committed in the past and relentless angst about the thoughts of future. One of the references is a testimony, a text that runs across on three LED panels placed on the floor, of a schoolgirl who witnessed the Hiroshima nuclear explosion. This re-edited first hand description of such a dreadful vision of terror and screams is almost like a hounding dream yet more real than real that sends a chill down through the spine. It is a story of burned and mutilated dead bodies, how a familiar neighborhood suddenly turns into a ruined war zone and how the radiation turns a young girl into looking like old aged. The redness of the LED text plays the role of the image by reflecting it on to the images of dogs thus playing a crucial role in building up the totality of the installation." T. V. Santhosh.

Living with a Wound, 2009“The wounds ...At that time I did not understand what was happening with all of us. But then the future was dark and memories pained us more, nothing seemed to be making any sense except we knew that there was no way out. From time to time some civilians, maybe drug manufacturers, came to visit me. Without any reason, they made a cut in my arm above the palm 10 centimetres long and 2 centimetres wide. Today I understand that the surgery that was done on me without anaesthesia and was done purposely with tools that weren't sterilised to cause infection. At times they kept exchanging the bandages with different medicated creams and liquids. The bandage was not wrapped around the arm but only covered the wound. Every day they examined the cut and each time the cut was about to heal, they reopened it and started the whole thing from the beginning. Alternate days a civilian would come to check the charts, made some remarks and gave orders. A part of the experiment was also to observe my ability to work with the wound and how far I could bear its pain. Slowly, as hopelessness started encroaching the pain, one day, Oh God! I heard someone screaming that war is over! And saw the soldiers there to rescue us from this hell..." text on the LED Panel of the sculpture, Living with a Wound, 2009

Living with a Wound II "The text in this sculpture was taken from a testimony of a holocaust victim who was part of the Nazi medical experiments. They were treating humans like mere guinea pigs. My reference here is to an experiment they conducted to see how long a man can continue to live, enduring the pain of a wound on his body. The Nazis would make a cut on the hand with un- sterilised tools, then cover it for some days and then open it up again and again on a regular basis each times just before it is about to heal so as to keep it a living wound." – T. V. Santhosh.

Effigies of Turbulent Yesterdays, 2011–2013 "The genre of the landscape can be understood, among other things, as a product of the encounter between the pastoral imagination and the aspirations of an emergent landed gentry, whose relationship to their property is often the ostensible subject matter of the paintings. Apart from whatever aesthetic qualities that these works might have, they allude to a history of dispossession of jointly held resources, – largely through the private enclosure of open fields that had been farmed collectively by the peasantry over centuries, – a history that remains invisible in the paintings themselves. In a similar way, the equestrian portrait can be seen as a figuration of power. Its relative rarity is perhaps the result of generic conventions that tied it to an essentially commemorative purpose, but coupled with the fact that in the history of portraiture it is the powerful who have until recently had the privilege of being represented, one can see that it functioned almost exclusively in the service of ruling elite in establishing and extending their authority over their subjects. In painting, the equestrian figure is also implicated in conquest, as he traverses a landscape that he metaphorically colonises or administers and which became (or was) his fiefdom, acquired and maintained more often than not through the exercise of illegitimate power.

These iconographic conventions are here stood on their head (or lack thereof). In ‘Effigies of Turbulent Yesterdays’ we have a clash of different linguistic registers, with the powerful mimetic realism of the equestrian portrait meeting head on the schematised fountain of blood that springs from it, whose sources one can trace to miniature painting as well as comic book illustration. If the King is the Head of the State, then a decapitated monument is both a ludicrous and pitiful spectacle, – an act of iconoclasm which, like all forms of subversion attempts not to destroy it, but to turn it into an inverted representation of itself, or in this case, into an anti-monument that lays bare the disavowed histories of violence that sustain it, and by extension all such iconographies of power. The King famously has two bodies, a physical one that will eventually be subject to infirmity and death, and a symbolic one which metonymically stands in for the body politic and which continues to extend its dominion, by coercion or consent through the accoutrements of power. This act of symbolic regicide thus exemplifies the truth of every iconoclastic gesture, – the recognition that every contestation of power starts with the destruction of the images through which its authority continues to be exercised and reproduced, – and thereby indicates the limits of sovereign power.- Sathyanand Mohan.

== Scholarships and awards ==
- 1990–94 Visva Bharati Merit Scholarship
- 1994 Ramkinker Award
- 1997 Kanoria Scholarship
- 1997 National Scholarship
- 1997 Inlaks Foundation (Indian)
- 1997 Kerala Lalit Kala Academy State Award
- 2010 Padmini Award, Kerala Lalit Kala Academy

== Art market ==
Many of his works have featured in Christie's and Sotheby's over the past decade. T. V. Santhosh is represented by The Guild.

== Collection ==
Major European and Indian Collections.

== Selected bibliography ==
- Shahane, Girish. Engendering-Images of Women. 2001. Mumbai: The Guild. (exh. Cat.)
- Shahane, Girish. The Human Factor. 2001. Mumbai: The Guild. (exh. Cat.)
- Adajania, Nancy. Debt. 2002. Mumbai: The Guild. (exh. Cat.)
- Shahane, Girish. Words and Images. 2002. Mumbai: The Guild. (exh. Cat.)
- Kapur, Geeta, and Chaitanya Sambrani. Crossing Generations:Diverge. 2003. Mumbai:Jehangir Art Gallery.
- Jakimowloz, Marta. X. 2003. Bangalore: Sakshi Gallery. (exh. Cat.)
- Hoskote, Ranjit. One Hand Clapping/Siren. 2003. Mumbai: The Guild. (exh. Cat.)
- Hoskote, Ranjit. Transfigurations at the Margin of Blur: Recent Paintings by T.V. Santhosh. 2003. Mumbai:The Guild.
- Ernst W.Koelnsperger. The Dual Path of Indian Art Today Part | – || 2003 – 2004.
- Bombay Boys. 2004. New Delhi. Palette Art Gallery. (not sure if catalogue was done).
- Jumaey, Zehra. Generation i. 2005. Mumbai:Saffronart and Mumbai:The Guild. (exh. Cat.)
- Ways of Seeing. 2005. New Delhi: Art Alive. (exh. Cat.)
- Paths of Progression. 2005. Mumbai:Saffronart.
- change of Address. 2005. India:The Guild (exh. Cat.)
- Fleetwood, Anne, and Conor Macklin. False Promises. 2005. London: Grosvenor Gallery. (exh. Cat.) (in collaboration with The Guild)
- Adajania, Nancy, and Baiju Parthan. Unresolved Stories. 2004–2007. Mumbai: The Guild.
- Cavin, Yasmin. After Shock. 2007. Norwich:Sainsbury Centre Museum: 68,69. (exh. Cat.)
- Seema Bawa. Does Size Matter ||? 2007. Mumbai: Studio Confluence. (Exh. Cat.) (curated by Bhavna Kakar)
- Mehta, Anupa. India 20-Conversations with Contemporary Artists. 2007 Vadodara:Mapin/Alekhya Foundation.
- A Room to Pray. Zurich: Avanthay Contemporary 2008.(in collaboration with The Guild) (exh. Cat.)
- Nair, Manoj. Affair. Dubai: 1x1 Gallery 2008. (curated by Bose) (dialogue with M.N.)
- Where in the World. 2008. New Delhi: Devi Art Foundation
- Signs Taken for Wonders:Recent Art from India and Pakistan. London: Aicon Gallery, 2008. (don't know if they had a catalogue)
- Conor and Anne Macklin. Living With A Wound. London: Grosvenor Vadehra 2009.(exh. Cat.)
- Merali, Shaheen, and Brigitte Ulmer, Alexander Keefe, Santhosh S. T.V.Santhosh:Blood And Spit. 2009. Mumbai:The Guild, New York:Shainman Gallery.
- Vancouver Biennale. 2009–2011: 80,81.
- In Transition: New Art India. 2010. Canada: Richmond Art Gallery.
- Merali, Shaheen. The 11th Hour: An Exhibition of Contemporary Art from India/ Diaspora. Beijing: Tang Contemporary Arts Centre.
- Inside India Italy: Luce Gallery 2010: 16,17,68,69. (Exh. Cat.)
- The Empire Strikes Back:Indian Art Today. 2010. London:The Saatchi Gallery.
- Sinha, Gayatri. Voices Of Change: Indian Artists. Mumbai: 2011. The Marg Foundation.
- The Land 2011. Berlin: Nature Morte April.(exhibition catalogue)
- Indian Art Fair New Delhi 2011.
- Indian Art Fair New Delhi 2012.
