= Navjot Altaf =

Indian artist

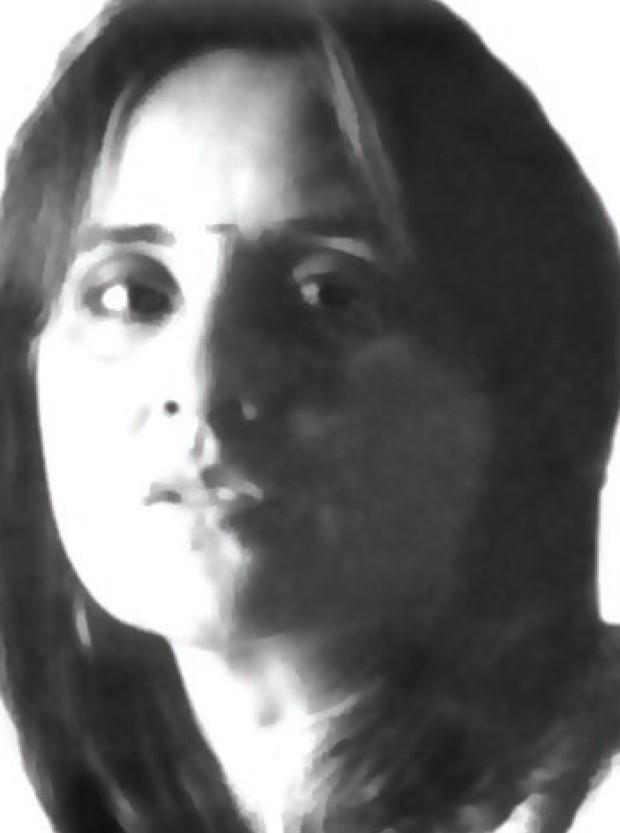
- Born: 1949 (age 76–77); Meerut, India
- Education: Degree in Fine and Applied Arts
- Occupations: Artist, painting, drawing, photography, sculpture, video, installation, mixed-media, and public art.
- Writing career
- Language: Hindi, English

Navjot Altaf, often referred to simply as "Navjot," is an artist, currently based in Bastar and Mumbai, India. Navjot has worked in painting, drawing, photography, sculpture, video, installation, mixed-media, and public art. Navjot's art draws from art history, as well as tribal craftsmanship of India, particularly of the Bastar region. Her work has been exhibited at Tate Modern in London, the National Gallery of Modern Art in New Delhi, at the XV Sydney Biennale, in Sydney, Australia and at the Talwar Gallery in New York City and New Delhi.

== Life and career ==
Born in Meerut, India, in 1949, Navjot earned a degree in Fine and Applied Arts from Sir J.J. School of Art in Mumbai. While in school, she met artist Altaf and they married in 1972, travelling together and sharing a studio over the course of the next three decades. Navjot continues to cite their relationship as a major part of her artistic growth.

=== Activism ===
Both Navjot and her husband were members of the Progressive Youth Movement (PROYOM) in the 1970s, and liberal political ideology has continued to inform her creative process throughout her career. Much of Navjot's work attempts to question and expand the expected interaction between artist and viewer, creating a cooperative, dialectic conversation around the work of art. Navjot has collaborated with traditional craftspeople of India, particularly in the villages of Bastar, in the creation of her sculptures and installations, and has worked to bring their work to exhibitions in Mumbai. Her fascination with oral history, ritual, and communal creation has led to other cooperative projects; the 2010 work Touch IV, for example, emerged from a collaboration between the artist and a group of sex workers, and created the space for a multivocal communication about the ideas of intimacy and desire. Navjot has organized art workshops for women and children in villages in Bastar, and she has worked to design alternative public spaces that allow young people to meet and engage with each other creatively.

=== Feminism ===
Navjot's collaborative projects involving traditional female crafts, such as weaving, are viewed as a feminist approach to art. Many of Navjot's sculptures, such as (Untitled, Blue Lady) also engage directly with the female body and its representation in Indian art, often both invoking and subverting the forms of traditional fertility figures or female divinities.

== Awards and honours ==
- 1971: Bombay Art Society's Annual Art Exhibition award
- 1980 : Maharashtra State Art Exhibition award
- 1983: All India Fine Arts and Crafts Society award
