= Devi Art Foundation =

Art museum in Delhi

- Location: Delhi, India
- Type: Art museum
- Founders: Anupam and Lekha Poddar
- Architect: Aniket Bhagwat
- Website: deviartfoundation.org

The Devi Art Foundation is a contemporary art museum located in Gurgaon, Delhi, India.

The museum opened in September 2008, making it the first contemporary art museum in India. It was founded by Anupam Poddar and his mother Lekha Poddar, whose family businesses include Sirpur Paper Mills and the Devigarh luxury hotel in Rajasthan.

The museum hosts permanent and temporary exhibitions of Indian art from the collections of its founders, described by ArtAsiaPacific as "one of India's most important private collections," containing "more than 7,000 contemporary, modern and tribal artworks from across the Subcontinent." Deeksha Nath organized its first exhibition, Still Moving Image, focused on the video and photography of twenty-five Indian artists.

The museum's building, designed by architect Aniket Bhagwat, mixes Corten steel with handmade bricks. It also houses the headquarters of Sirpur Paper Mills on its upper floors.
