= Ranbir Kaleka =

Indian multi-media artist

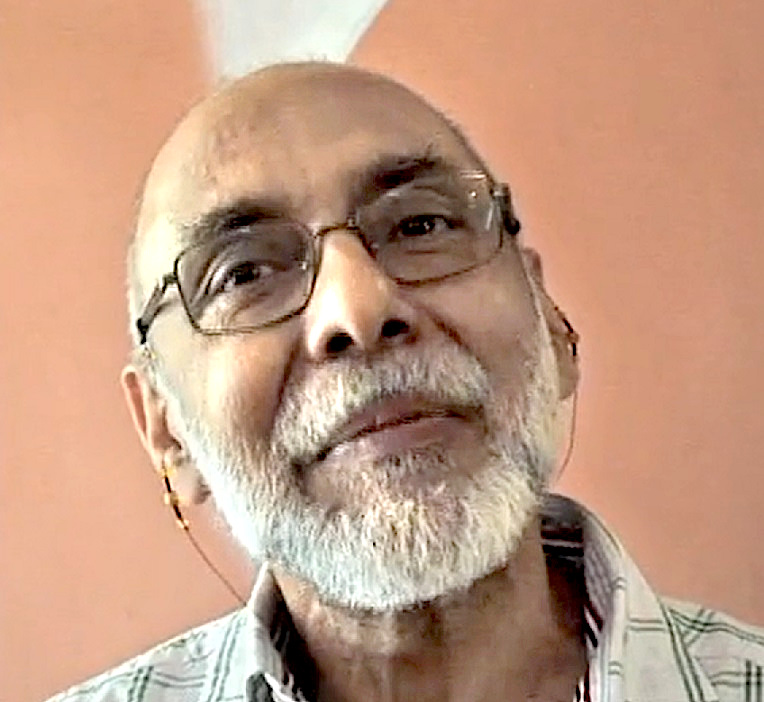
- Born: April 7, 1953 (age 73); Patiala, Punjab, India
- Citizenship: Indian
- Education: Government College of Art, Chandigarh; Royal College of Art
- Known for: Painting; Video art; Multi-media art
- Movement: Surrealism
- Awards: National Award, Lalit Kala Akademi (1979)

Ranbir Kaleka (born 1953) is a contemporary Indian multi-media artist based in New Delhi whose work often centers around themes of animals, sexuality and tradition. Initially trained as a painter, his work has increasingly animated two-dimensional canvases within experimental film narrative sequences, and has been exhibited in a range of major international gallery and museum venues.

In 2007, Dr. Felicitas Heimann-Jelinek, Senior Judaica curator, Spertus Museum Chicago commissioned Ranbir Kaleka to make a Holocaust memorial. The site-specific video installation is titled "Consider", a title inspired by the poem of the same name by Primo Levi, and arrived at in consultation with Heimann-Jelinek. The installation consists of two projections, a painting and an audio narrative of oral testimony from Auschwitz.

In 2002 Ranbir Kaleka exhibited at the Kunsthalle, Vienna, Austria in the exhibition Kapital and Karma: Recent Positions in Indian Art.

Ranbir Kaleka was awarded the National Award by the President of India at the 22nd National Exhibition of Art organised by the Lalit Kala Akademi in 1979 in Delhi. In 2005 Kaleka showed at the 51st Venice Biennale in the exhibition ‘iCon - India Contemporary’ Co-curated by Julie Evans, Gordon Knox and Peter Nagy. In 2019 he was honored with Punjab Gaurav Sanmaan by Punjab Arts Council and Punjab Lalit Kala Akademi.
