= Baiju Parthan =

Indian artist

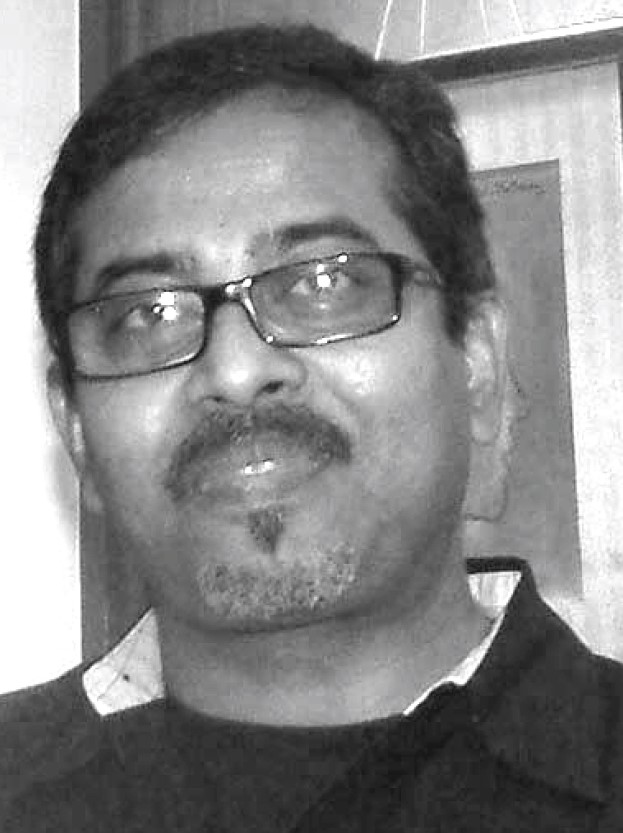
Baiju Parthan

Baiju Parthan (born 1956 in Kerala), is a painter of intermedia art in India.

Curated by Ranjit Hoskote, Baiju Parthan: A User's Manual takes the reader on a tour through the artist's diversely populated imagination. It maps Parthan's journey from his childhood in Kerala, through his student years in Goa, to his struggle to find a niche in the contemporary Indian art scenario. This book records Parthan's participation in the last years of the countercultural hippie scene, his encounters with spiritual teachings and shamanic lore, his experiments with form, and his engagement with media flows and alternative reality environments.

Baiju Parthan: A User's Manual includes a monographic essay on the artist by Hoskote, as well as a freewheeling conversation between artist and author, extracts from Parthan's journal, a section on his intermedia works, a selection of the artist's occasional writings, and a biographical essay.
