= List of Delhi Technological University alumni =

Delhi Technological University is a state university situated in Delhi, India.

== Notable alumni ==
Fields with a — have unknown values.

=== Architecture ===
Name	Class year	Discipline	Notability	Reference(s)
Aditya Prakash (Note: Prakash did not complete his studies at Delhi Polytechnic. In the middle of his course, India's independence forced the English faculty leading the Polytechnic to return to England.)	1948	Architecture	Architect	
Raj Rewal	1952	Architecture	Architect and member of the Indian Institute of Architects Hall of Fame.	

=== Arts and entertainment ===
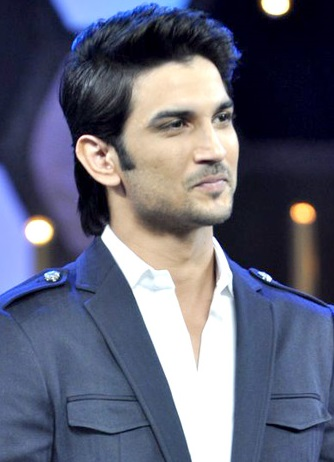
Sushant Singh Rajput

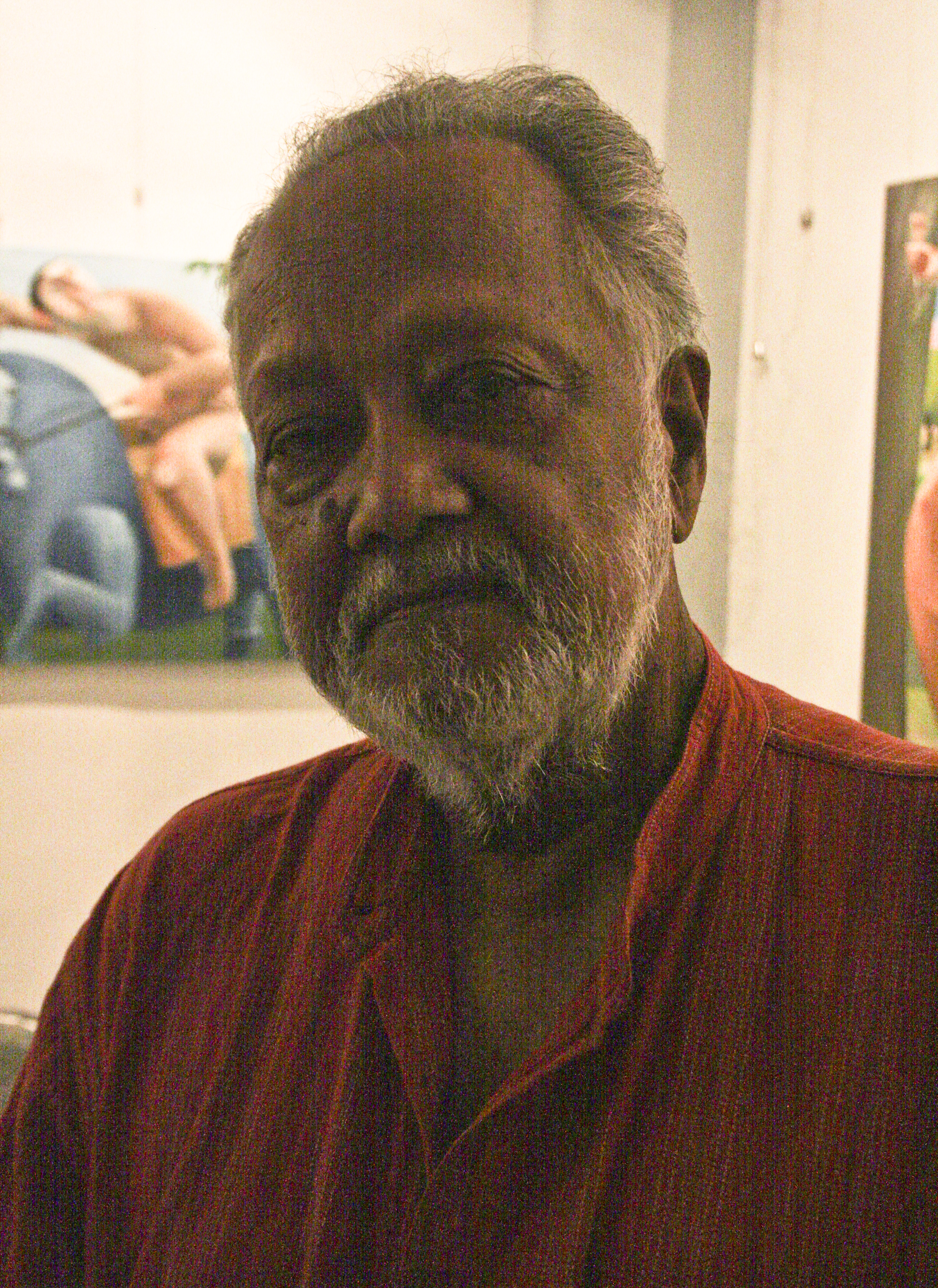
Dhiraj Choudhury

Name	Class year	Discipline	Notability	Reference(s)
Manjit Bawa	1963	Fine arts	Painter	
Eric Bowen	1959	Art	Painter, received a grant from the Royal Norwegian Ministry of Foreign Affairs for his series "The Right to Life in Peace".	
Avinash Chandra	1953	Painting	Painter	
Jagmohan Chopra	1958	Fine arts	Former president and chairman of the All India Fine Arts and Crafts Society, and former principle of the Government College of Art, Chandigarh.	
Dhiraj Choudhury	1967	Art	Painter	
Gopi Gajwani	1962	Graphic Designing	Painter, designer and cartoonist	
Mahirwan Mamtani	1962	Fine arts	Painter, graphic and multimedia artist	
Meera Mukherjee	1950	Painting, graphics and sculpture	Sculptor, received the Padma Shri in 1992.	
Sushant Singh Rajput (did not graduate)	2007	Mechanical Engineering	Film actor. Best remembered for the role of MS Dhoni in the biopic M.S. Dhoni: The Untold Story, Sarfaraz in PK (film) and his debut film Kai Po Che! based on Chetan Bhagat's best seller The 3 Mistakes of My Life.	
Om Prakash Sharma	1958	Fine arts	Painter and honorary member of the Russian Academy of Arts, Moscow. Received the National Art Award from the Lalit Kala Akademi.	
Arpita Singh	1959	Fine arts	Painter, received India's third-highest civilian award, the Padma Bhushan in 2011.	
Paramjit Singh	1958	Fine arts	Painter and former professor in the Faculty Of Fine Arts, Jamia Millia Islamia.	
Jagdish Swaminathan (Note: Swaminathan did not complete his studies at Delhi Polytechnic.)		—	Painter and member of Group 1890.	
Durjoy Datta	2008	Mechanical engineering	Author, screenwriter, and publisher	
Sachin Garg	2008	Electronics and communication engineering	Author	
Rajat Sood	2019	Engineering Physics	Standup Comedian. Winner of India's Laughter Champion (Season 1) on Sony TV	

=== Business ===
Name	Class year	Discipline	Notability	Reference(s)
Rohit Chadda	2005	Computer engineering	Co-founder of Foodpanda India	
Vijay Shekhar Sharma	1998	Electronics and communication engineering	Founder of Paytm	
Sanjay Gupta	1981	Mechanical engineering	Country Manager of Google India	
Surya Kant	1976	Electrical engineering	President of North America, UK, and Europe operations of Tata Consultancy Services	
Manish Khera	1991	Electrical engineering	Former CEO of Airtel Payments Bank	
Sanjay Gupta	1996	Electronics and Communication engineering	President and CEO at Minda Corporation, Chairman - Indian Electronics & Semiconductors Association, Ex- Vice President & India Country Manager of NXP Semiconductors	
Suhail Sameer	2006	Electrical Engineering	CEO of BharatPe	
Akshant Goyal	2005	Computer Engineering	CFO of Zomato	
Raman CV	1982	Mechanical Engineering	CTO of Maruti Suzuki India	
Nipun Aggarwal	1994	Electrical Engineering	Chief Commercial Officer of Air India	
Praveen Sinha	2001	Electrical Engineering	Founder of Jabong.com	
Supam Maheshwari	1995	Mechanical Engineering	First Indian Founder to build 3 unicorn startups FirstCry, Xpressbees, Globalbees	
Ambareesh Murty	1994	Civil Engineering	Founder of Pepperfry, India's largest online furniture store	
Varun Alagh	2005	Electrical Engineering	Founder of MamaEarth (unicorn startup)	
Piyush Shah	2001	Production & Industrial Engineering	Founder of Glance (company) & Co-Founder of InMobi (unicorn startups)	
Raghav Joshi	2007	Electronics & Communication Engineering	Co-Founder of Rebel Foods, previously Faasos (unicorn startup)	
Saurabh Nigam	2000	Civil Engineering	Founder of ElasticRun (unicorn startup)	
Aakash Sinha	2001	Electrical Engineering	Founder of Omnipresent Robot Tech, developed 3D image models for Chandrayaan-2 rover	
Uday Reddy	1993	Electronics & Communication Engineering	Founder of YuppTV, World's #1 Internet Pay TV provider & one of the leading OTT player for South Asian content abroad	
Raj Soin	1969	Mechanical Engineering	Founder of Soin International LLC, USA	
Rashmi Daga	2001	Electrical Engineering	Founder of FreshMenu, Top 10 Women Entrepreneurs In India (2021)	
Promod Haque	1969	Electrical Engineering	World's No.1 Venture Capitalist in 2004, Appeared on Annual Forbes Midas List for 13 years	
Avinash Pant	1995	Electrical Engineering	Marketing Head of Facebook India	
Navtez Bal	1997	Electrical Engineering	Chief Operating Officer of Microsoft India	
Manish Gulyani	1990	Electronics & Communication Engineering	Vice President and General Manager of Nokia Deepfield	
Himanshu Bajaj	2000	Civil Engineering	Business Head of BYJU'S	
Sanjay Brahmawar	1992	Civil Engineering	CEO of Software AG & Top 100 Innovation CEOs Award - 2021	
Amit Singh	1989	Electrical Engineering	Board of Directors of Asana (software)	
Divya Garg	2005	Polymer Engineering	Head of HR Uber India and South Asia region	
Sudhir Malhotra	1990	Mechanical Engineering	Vice President of Renault India	
Kumar Gaurav Gupta	2005	Production & Industrial engineering	VP & Country Manager of SAP Concur India	
Balaji Tamirisa	1985	Electrical Engineering	CTO of Dedrone, USA	
Aruna Singh	1985	Electronics & Communication Engineering	Chairman & Managing Director of RailTel	
Ravish Sharma	2003	Electronics & Communication Engineering	Vice President, Product Management of GreyOrange	
Gunjan Kedia	1992	Electronics & Communication Engineering	Vice Chairman of U.S. Bancorp (US Bank) and 100 Most Influential Women in US Finance	
Sukhvinder Singh	1992	Production & Industrial Engineering	Senior VP of Technology & Innovation of Lamar Advertising Company	

=== Civil Services ===
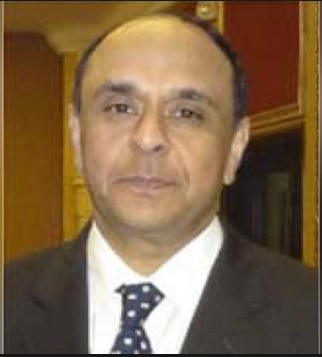
Arvind Saxena

Name	Class year	Discipline	Notability	Reference(s)
Arvind Saxena	1976	Civil Engineering	Chairman of the Union Public Service Commission and former Research and Analysis Wing(RAW) Officer.	
B. V. R. Subrahmanyam	1983	Mechanical Engineering	Chief Executive Officer of NITI Aayog and former Indian Administrative Service(IAS) Officer.	
Karnal Singh	1979	Electrical & Electronics Engineering	Former Chief of Enforcement Directorate (ED) and Former Indian Police Service(IPS) Officer.	
Arun Goyal	1980	Electrical Engineering	Former Secretary to Prime Minister's Office and Former Indian Administrative Service(IAS) Officer.	
Muktesh Chander	1983	Electronics & Communication Engineering	Special Commissioner of Delhi Police & Former Indian Police Service(IPS) Officer.	
Ankita Jain	2014	Computer Engineering	AIR-3 in Union Public Service Commission Civil Services Exam 2020 and AIR-1 in Graduate Aptitude Test in Engineering GATE 2016 (Computer Science).	

=== Science and technology ===
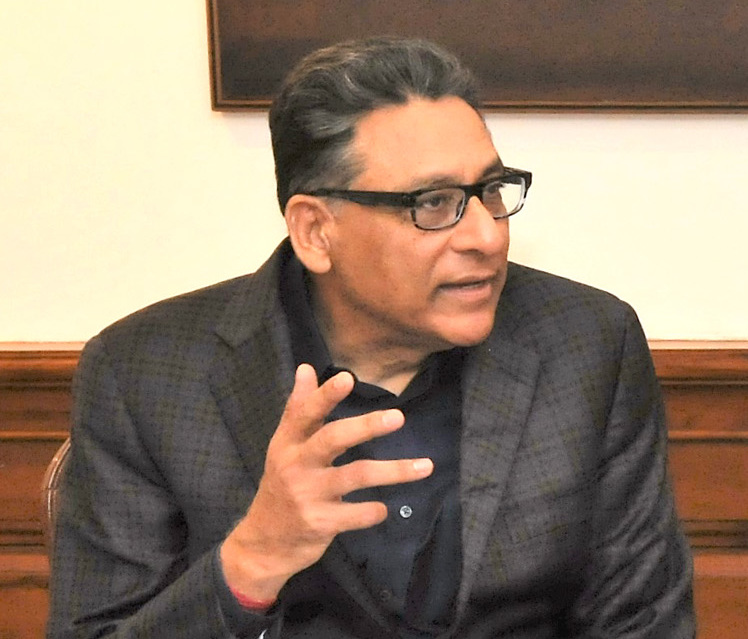
Vinod Dham

Name	Class year	Discipline	Notability	Reference(s)
Vinod Dham	1971	Electrical engineering	Engineer and venture capitalist who is known as the "Father of the Pentium" for his work in the Microprocessor Products group at Intel.	
Dharendra Yogi Goswami	1969	Mechanical engineering	Distinguished university professor in chemical engineering and director of the Clean Energy Research Center at the University of South Florida. Founder of the air purifier company Molekule.	
Ravi Grover	1970	Mechanical engineering	Nuclear engineer, former vice-chancellor of the Homi Bhabha National Institute and member of the Atomic Energy Commission of India. Received the Padma Shri, India's fourth highest civilian award, in 2014. Responsible for the successful negotiations in the India–United States Civil Nuclear Agreement.	
Emani Kumar	1991	Civil engineering	Deputy secretary general of ICLEI and founding executive director of its South Asian arm.	
Ishwar Puri	1982	Mechanical engineering	Vice President of Research at University of Southern California, former Dean of the McMaster Faculty of Engineering and former N. Waldo Harrison Professor at Virginia Tech.	
Subhav Sinha	2009	Electrical engineering	Inventor of Mitra, a personalized battery-operated vehicle. Chosen as one of the "International Climate Champions" for the year 2010 by the British Council.	
Rajinder Kumar (chemical engineer)	1955	Masters in Chemical engineering	Chemical engineer and a former professor at the Indian Institute of Science. Known for his work of mass transfer in multiphase systems. Received the third highest Indian civilian award Padma Bhushan in 2003 and the Lifetime Achievement Award by Indian Institute of Chemical Engineers in 2008.	
Neeraj Jhanji	1993	Electrical Engineering	Developed world's first mobile social network based on status update & location ImaHima. Inventor of status updates & mobile check-in technology. Sold patents to Facebook	

=== Other ===
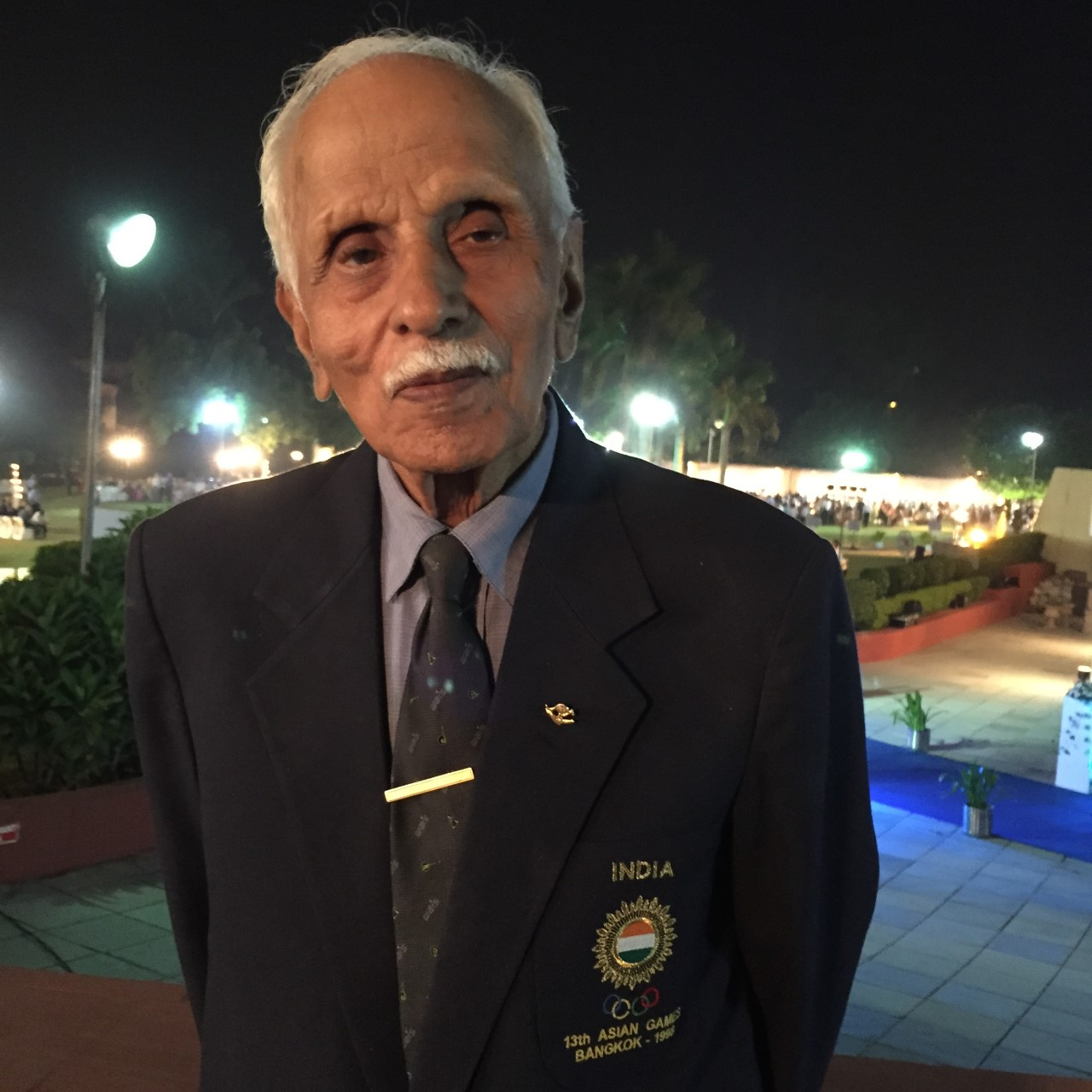
Raghbir Singh Bhola

Name	Class year	Discipline	Notability	Reference(s)
Shrikrishna Kulkarni	1985	Electrical engineering	Chairperson of the Board of Governors at Indian Institute of Management Calcutta	
Subhash Chandra Agrawal	1971	Mechanical engineering	Right to Information activist	
Raghbir Singh Bhola	1951	Electrical engineering	Hockey player, Olympic gold medalist, and Arjuna Awardee.	
Niketan Madhok	1997	Mechanical engineering	Fashion Model and Producer.	
Captain Abhilasha Barak	2016	Electronics & Communication Engineering	First woman combat aviator of the Indian Army	
Professor Piyush Sharma	1987	Electrical Engineering	John Curtin Distinguished Professor at Curtin University, Australia	
Avanish Rai	2010	Production & Industrial Engineering	Developed Indian Production Model (IPM).	
