= Dharendra Yogi Goswami =

Indian-American engineering researcher

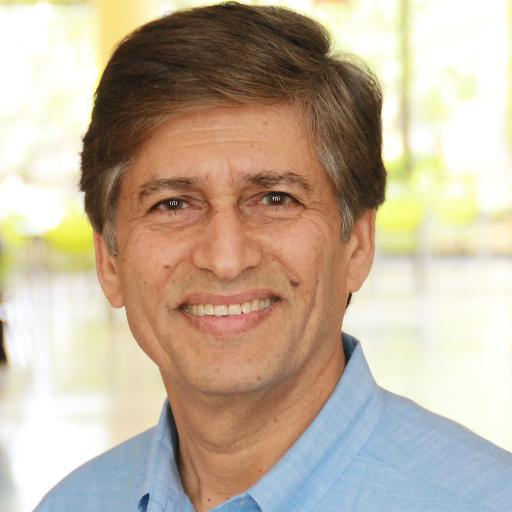
- Born: 15 May 1948 (age 78); India
- Education: Delhi College of Engineering, Auburn University
- Awards: Farrington Daniels Award from ISES, Frank Kreith Energy Award and John Yellott Award for Solar Energy from ASME
- Scientific career
- Fields: Solar Energy, Heat Transfer
- Workplaces: University of South Florida

Dharendra Yogi Goswami (born May 15, 1948) is an U.S. inventor, entrepreneur, author, and educator. He has few times advised the US Congress on energy policy and the transition to renewable energy. Goswami is a Distinguished Professor and the director of the Clean Energy Research Center at the University of South Florida. He is the emeritus editor-in-chief of the journal Solar Energy, and has published more than 400 peer-reviewed articles and a number of books and book chapters. He is also the inventor of the Goswami thermodynamic cycle. His inventions have been commercialized and in 2016 Goswami was inducted into Florida Inventors Hall of Fame. He co-founded Molekule, which markets an air purifier.

== Early life and education ==
Born in India (May 15, 1948), Yogi Goswami received his bachelor's degree in mechanical engineering from Delhi College of Engineering, and received his M.S. and PhD in mechanical engineering from Auburn University.

== Career ==
In 1977 he joined the Mechanical Engineering Department of North Carolina A&T State University as an assistant professor and became an associate professor and a professor in 1981 and 1985 respectively. In 1990 he moved to Gainesville Florida and joined the department of Mechanical and Aerospace Engineering, University of Florida. He was a professor and director of Solar Energy & Energy Conversion Laboratory at UF. In 2005 he joined the University of South Florida, where he currently is a distinguished professor and the director of the Clean Energy Research Center.

Goswami conducts applied research into solar thermal energy, thermodynamics, heat transfer, HVAC, photovoltaics, and hydrogen & fuel cells.

Goswami served as the president of the International Solar Energy Society (ISES, 2004–2005) and the International Association for Solar Energy Education. He is a fellow of ASME International and served as the ASME governor (2003–2006). Goswami serves as chief science and technology advisor and member of the technical advisory board at SunBorne Energy Services India Private Limited. In 2014 Goswami co-founded Molekule Inc. and served as its chief scientist. In 2023 the company filed for bankruptcy.[Goswami is a member of several editorial boards including Progress in Energy & Combustion Science.

Goswami is a recipient of the Farrington Daniels Award from ISES, Frank Kreith Energy award.

== See also ==
- List of Delhi Technological University alumni in science and technology
