= Ishwar Puri =

Indian-American scientist and engineer

Ishwar K. Puri
- Ishwar K. Puri at a scientific meeting held in Sendai, Japan in 2011
- Born: 1959 (age 66–67); New Delhi, India
- Citizenship: United States; Canada
- Education: University of California, San Diego (M.S.), (Ph.D.); Delhi College of Engineering (B.Sc.); St. Xavier's School, Delhi
- Known for: Partially premixed flames, laminar flames, magnetic fluids, nanoscale transport phenomena, mathematical biology
- Awards: Canadian Academy of Engineering Fellow; ASME Fellow; AAAS Fellow; Licensed Professional Engineer
- Scientific career
- Fields: Applied physics, Molecular simulations, Nanomechanics, Combustion, Heat transfer
- Workplaces: University of Southern California; McMaster University; Virginia Tech; University of Illinois at Chicago; University of California, San Diego
- Thesis: The structure and extinction of counterflow flames (1987)
- Doctoral advisor: Kalyanasundaram Seshadri

Ishwar Kanwar Puri (born 1959) is an Indian-American and Canadian scientist, engineer, and academic.

== Early life and education ==
Puri was born in New Delhi, India, in 1959. He studied at St. Xavier's School, Delhi from 1964 to 1976. He earned a Bachelor's degree in Mechanical Engineering from Delhi College of Engineering of Delhi University, Delhi in 1982, and M.S. (1984) and Ph.D. (1987) degrees in Engineering Science (Applied Mechanics) from the University of California, San Diego.

His mother, Sushila Gaind Puri, was a pioneering anesthesiologist in New Delhi, and his father, Krishan Kanwar Puri, completed his doctoral dissertation from University of Münster in 1955.

== Academic publications ==
The author of archival publications and books, and patents, Puri is listed among the top 0.4% of scholars among twenty nine million considered by ScholarGPS in terms of the impact of his publications. He is listed among the top two percent of scientists in the Updated science-wide author databases of standardized citation indicators based on citations to his work.

Puri has explained the structure and extinction of counterflow diffusion flames, use of magnetic fluids for heat transfer and drug targeting, how biological inks can be formulated to print mammalian cells into three-dimensional cellular structures with diamagnetophoresis, and provided mathematical models for the progression of disease, such as cancer and Alzheimer's disease.

His books include Combustion Science and Engineering, CRC Press, Advanced Thermodynamics Engineering, and Environmental Implications of Combustion Processes.

== Career ==
Puri is Senior Vice President of Research & Innovation at University of Southern California, where he oversees the USC Office of Research and Innovation, where the research portfolio fhe is responsible for exceeds US$1 billion. He has oversight over protection of human subject research, animal care and use for research, research integrity, research contracts and grants, research advancement, initiatives and facilities, research strategy and technology, intellectual property commercialization, and entrepreneurship and startup programs.

Puri is also Professor of Aerospace and Mechanical Engineering in the USC Viterbi School of Engineering with affiliate appointments in the Mork Family Department of Chemical Engineering & Materials Science, and Alfred E. Mann Department of Biomedical Engineering.

Before his arrival at USC, Puri served as Dean of the Faculty of Engineering and Professor at McMaster University in Hamilton, Ontario, Canada. Upon his departure from McMaster, the university credited him with developing innovative approaches to engineering education and experiential learning, and furthering research.

Prior to McMaster, Puri served as N. Waldo Harrison Professor and Department Head of Engineering Science and Mechanics at Virginia Tech from 2004-13. He arrived there from the University of Illinois at Chicago after 15 years of service at various ranks, leaving as Professor and Executive Associate Dean of Engineering.

His department at Virginia Tech was housed in Norris Hall, the site of the shooting in 2007, which he experienced. Puri played a role in the reoccupation of that space.

He has served as the elected chair of Engineering Deans Canada (formerly National Council of Deans of Engineering and Applied Science). In 2019, he was appointed as a member of the Council of Natural Sciences and Engineering Research Council of Canada. Puri is a member of the board of directors of the California Council on Science and Technology.

== Honors and awards ==
Puri is a Fellow of the Canadian Academy of Engineering, American Association for the Advancement of Science, and American Society of Mechanical Engineers. He received the 2021 Engineering Excellence Award from Professional Engineers Ontario and Ontario Society of Professional Engineers.

== Topical and literary contributions ==
Puri writes on issues at the intersection of science, technology, education and society. His first publication was a book of poetry, Narcissus Wept, where a reviewer notes, "He has something to say evidently and tries to say it with becoming gravity."

== See also ==
- List of Delhi Technological University alumni

Academic offices
Preceded by Randolph Hall	Vice President of Research University of Southern California; August 1, 2021–	Incumbent

Academic offices
Preceded by David S. Wilkinson	Dean of McMaster University Faculty of Engineering; July 1, 2013–July 31, 2021	Succeeded by
