= Xpressbees =

Indian logistics company

- Company type: Private
- Industry: Logistics
- Founded: 2015
- Founder: Amitava Saha
- Headquarters: Pune, Maharashtra, India
- Key people: Amitava Saha (Managing Director & CEO)
- Revenue: ▲₹1,904.4 crore (FY22)
- Net income: ▼₹−27.1 crore (2022)
- Website: www.xpressbees.com

Xpressbees (legally Busybees Logistics Solutions Private Limited) is an Indian logistics and supply chain company headquartered in Pune, Maharashtra. It was established in 2015 as a spin-off from FirstCry, an e-commerce platform co-founded by Amitava Saha and Supam Maheshwari. Its operations include parcel delivery, reverse logistics, warehousing, and cross-border shipping.

== History ==
Xpressbees was founded as the logistics arm of FirstCry, an online retailer of baby products, before being incorporated as an independent company in 2015. Its early investors included SAIF Partners (now Elevation Capital), IDG Ventures, and Vertex Ventures. In 2017, Alibaba Group invested approximately $35 million in the company.

By 2020, Xpressbees had expanded beyond e-commerce delivery to provide third-party warehousing and heavy cargo services. In the same year, it raised about ₹800 crore (US$110 million) from a consortium including Investcorp, Norwest Venture Partners, and Gaja Capital. In February 2022, the company secured US$300 million in a Series F round led by Blackstone Growth, TPG Growth, and ChrysCapital, which brought its valuation above US$1 billion.

Subsequent funding included US$40 million from Khazanah Nasional Berhad in early 2023 and US$80 million from the Ontario Teachers’ Pension Plan in November 2023.

== Partnerships and acquisitions ==
In February 2021, Xpressbees acquired NimbusPost, a shipping aggregation service provider. In June 2021, the company announced a partnership with Unicommerce, a supply chain software platform. The following month, it entered into a strategic partnership with SpiceXpress, the cargo division of SpiceJet, to support air-freight operations across select Indian cities.

In August 2023, Xpressbees acquired Trackon Courier, a New Delhi-based courier company, in an all-cash transaction. The company is also a logistics partner on the Government of India's Open Network for Digital Commerce (ONDC).

== Operations ==
As of March 2025, Xpressbees stated that it operated about 4,500 service centres and 250 hubs, and engaged more than 28,000 delivery partners.

== Recognition ==
In March 2025, Fortune India included XpressBees among five logistics ventures profiled in its Most Promising Startups issue.
