= Management Development Institute =

University in India

- Motto: Yogāh Kārmāsu Kaushālām
- Motto in English: Perfection in action is Yoga
- Type: Private business school
- Established: 1973
- Accreditation: AACSB, NBA, Association of MBAs, EQUIS
- Chairperson: K. Satyanarayana Raju
- Director: Dr. Arvind Sahay
- Location: Gurgaon, Haryana, India
- Campus: Urban
- Website: www.mdi.ac.in

Management Development Institute (MDI) is private business School in India. It was established in 1973 by Industrial Finance Corporation of India and is located in Gurgaon, a commercial hub near the Indian capital of New Delhi.

== Rankings ==
Institute rankings

Business/Management – India
- Outlook India (2022): 2

MDI was ranked 9th among overall management schools in India, ranked 2nd in the list of Private B Schools in India, by the National Institutional Ranking Framework (NIRF) in 2023, ranked 2nd in India's Best B-schools by Outlook, ranked 7th among Best B-schools by The Week, ranked 7th again amongst India's best B-schools by India Today.

== Campus ==
MDI has its own campus spread over 37 acres (150,000 m^{2}) in Gurgaon. The campus is about 12 km. from Indira Gandhi International Airport, New Delhi. MDI has a campus with red brick buildings and trees. The buildings have been given names such as Gurukul, Takshila, Lakshaya, Scholars, Renaissance, Parthenon etc. On August 24, 2014, MDI inaugurated its second campus in Murshidabad, West Bengal with the launch of its Post Graduate Programme in Management (PGPM). It was commemorated in the presence of the then Honorable President of India Shri Pranab Mukherjee.

=== Library ===
The MDI library has a collection of over 70,000 books, in addition to electronic resources which include e-books, journals, databases, audio-visual materials, CDs/DVDs, e-journals, reports, case studies, conference proceedings, training manuals etc.

== Academics ==
The institute offers various post graduate diploma programmes. These include full-time post graduate programmes in management and part-time programmes such as executive programmes. It also offers fellowship research programmes.

Full Time Programmes: MDI Gurgaon offers two-year Post Graduate Diploma in Management (PGDM), Post Graduate Diploma In Management - Business Analytics (PGDM Business Analytics), Post Graduate Diploma In Management - Human Resource Management (PGDM-HRM) and Post Graduate Diploma In Management - International Business (PGDM-IB). The AICTE-approved program is accredited AACSB, AMBA.

Online Management Programme - It also offers 2-year PGDM (Online) Programme which follows same curriculum as the 2 years full time Programme.

Executive PGDM Program - Many programmes for Working professionals are offered by MDI among which most popular are: Post Graduate Diploma in Management – Business Management (PGDM-BM), Post Graduate Diploma In Management - Business Administration (PGDM BA); Post Graduate Diploma In Management – Public Policy And Management (PGDM-PPM).

Fellowship Programmes: Also offered a Fellow Programme in Management (FPM).

Management Development Institute was set up in 1973 as an institute for training, consulting, and research activities. In 1986, Lt. Gen. ML Chibber, a Padma Bhushan, was appointed as its director. The same year, Prime Minister Rajiv Gandhi, along with HRD minister P. Chidambaram visited the MDI campus and discussed with Lt. Gen. ML Chibber about unifying leadership amongst private, public, and government sectors.

Thus, India's first full-time Executive PGDM program, called "National Management Programme (NMP)" was created with a 15-month curriculum. The core objective of the program was to develop appreciate mindsets across the three sectors and provide opportunity to learn from each other. Additionally, Gandhi conferred the following awards to the program: Prime Minister's gold medal for topper of the course, Finance Minister's gold medal for topper in finance, HR Minister's gold medal for topper in HR, and ITC gold medal for topper in marketing.

The program drew top government officers as well as private sector organisation executives that had the potential to attain top leadership positions. The program, originally restricted to top executives nominated by their organisations, eventually became open for general public applications also, and was MDI's flagship programme till 1994.

National Management Programme (NMP) was rechristened as "Post Graduate Diploma in Management – Business Management" (PGDM-BM) in 2021, has been open for general applications for Executive PGDM The AICTE-approved program is accredited as a full-time MBA by the Association of MBAs, UK (AMBA) and has been revised for duration (18 months), content, and corporate exposure as well.

MDI launched its 2-year Post Graduate Diploma in Management programme in 1994, making it as the new flagship programme. Thereafter, MDI added part-time PGDM (erstwhile EMP), PGDM- International Business, PGDM - Human Resource Management, Online PGDM, and fellowship programs to its list of courses offered.

== Exchange Program ==
MDI Gurgaon has one of the largest exchange programmes in the country where one out of every 5 students enrolled in the post graduate programmes get an opportunity to study abroad for one or two terms. It has partner institutes in more than 34 countries with institutes such as EDHEC Business School, Copenhagen Business School, HHL Leipzig Graduate School of Management, Bocconi University, RSM Erasmus University, ESCP Europe.

== Notable alumni ==
- Parameswaran Iyer
- Durjoy Datta
- K. S. Sabarinadhan
- Sachin Garg
