= Himmat Shah =

Indian sculptor (1933–2025)

- Born: 1933; Lothal, British India
- Died: 2 March 2025 (aged 91–92); Jaipur, Rajasthan
- Known for: sculptor
- Awards: Lalit Kala Akademi National Award (1956 and 1962); Kalidas Samman (2003); Lalit Kala Akademi Fellowship (2021)

Himmat Shah was an Indian sculptor. He received many awards including the Lalit Kala Akademi National Award, Kalidas Samman from the Madhya Pradesh government and Lalit Kala Akademi Fellowship.

== Biography ==
Himmat Shah was born in 1933 into a Jain family in Lothal, Gujarat. Recognizing his interest in art, his family sent him to Dakshinamurthy's home school, Gharshala, which followed Gandhian philosophy and an open education system. At the age of fourteen, he left home and went to Ahmedabad, where he studied at CN Kalaniketan under the guidance of veteran artist Rasiklal Parikh.

Shah trained as a drawing teacher at the J.J. School of Art in Mumbai and joined the Fine Arts faculty of the Maharaja Sayajirao University of Baroda on a national scholarship in 1956. In 1966, he received a French government scholarship to study under artists Stanley William Hayter and Krishna Reddy at the printmaking studio Atelier 17 in Paris. It was Octavio Paz who recommended him for this scholarship.

He was one of the founding members of the artists' collective Group 1890, which was established in 1962.

Shah died on March 2, 2025, at Jaipur, Rajasthan.

== Artistic career ==
In his sculpture, which emphasized modernism, Shah experimented with abstraction and primitivism. In 1980s, Shah had developed his own sculptural style, which included heads and other objects made of plaster, ceramic, and terracotta, often coated in silver or gold. Shah started his own studio in Jaipur in 2000s.

His sculptures have been exhibited in many prestigious galleries, including the Louvre, Royal Academy of Arts, Biennale de Paris, Museum Ludwig, Museo de la Nación, and the National Gallery of Modern Art, Delhi. An exhibition based on his life work titled 'Hammer on the Square' was exhibited at the Museum of Art, New Delhi in 2016.

== Awards and honors ==
- Lalit Kala Akademi National Award (1956 and 1962)
- Sahitya Kala Parishad Award 1988
- Kalidasa Samman from the Madhya Pradesh government 2003
- Lalit Kala Akademi Fellowship 2021
