= B. V. R. Subrahmanyam =

Former Chief Executive Officer of NITI Aayog

B. V. R Subrahmanyam

4th CEO of NITI Aayog
- In office 1 March 2023 – 28 February 2026
- Preceded by: Parameswaran Iyer
- Succeeded by: Anurag Jain

Commerce Secretary to Government of India
- In office 30 June 2021 – 30 September 2022
- Preceded by: Anup Wadhawan
- Succeeded by: Sunil Barthwal

Chief Secretary of Jammu and Kashmir
- In office 20 June 2018 – 28 May 2021
- Preceded by: Bharat Bhushan Vyas
- Succeeded by: Arun Kumar Mehta

Additional Chief Secretary (Home), Chhattisgarh
- In office March 2015 – 20 June 2018

Prime Minister's Office (PMO)
- In office March 2012 – March 2015

Personal details
- Born: 6 September 1962 (age 64) Andhra Pradesh
- Citizenship: Indian
- Education: Delhi Technological University, London Business School
- Occupation: IAS officer (Retd.)

B. V. R. Subramaniyam (born 6 September 1962) is a retired 1988-batch IAS officer of Chhattisgarh cadre who was the CEO of NITI Aayog from 2023 to 2026. Before that he was secretary in the Ministry of Commerce & Industry, Chief Secretary-Jammu & Kashmir, Principal Secretary-Government of Chhattisgarh, and has also held the positions in Prime Minister’s Office under Manmohan Singh and Narendra Modi. He has been instrumental in containing insurgency in Chhattisgarh in the 2010s.

== Education ==
B. V. R. Subrahmanyam hails from the Indian state of Andhra Pradesh. He completed his B.E. degree in Mechanical Engineering from Delhi Technological University in 1983. He also has a management degree from London Business School.

== Career ==
He is a 1987-batch IAS officer and has worked in the PMO between 2004–2008 and March 2012–March 2015, under Prime Minister Manmohan Singh and Narendra Modi. In between his PMO stints he worked with the World Bank. In 2015 he was shifted to Chhattisgarh where he was a principal secretary followed by Additional Chief Secretary (Home). He also held additional charges of jail and transport during his tenure there. Subrahmanyam was appointed by the Appointments Committee of the Cabinet as the Chief Secretary of Jammu and Kashmir in place of B. B. Vyas on 20 June 2018 following the collapse of the PDP-BJP coalition government.

=== Additional Chief Secretary (Home), Chhattisgarh ===
In March 2015 B. V. R. Subrahmanyam was shifted to Chhattisgarh. Chhattisgarh chief minister Raman Singh had personally requested Prime Minister Manmohan to shift Subrahmanyam to Chhattisgarh. Initially he was a principal secretary followed by Additional Chief Secretary (Home) with additional charges of jail and transport. Subrahmanyam is known for his role in conflict zone administration in the state. He pushed the coordination and cooperation between the central security forces and the state police. This, along with his on-field approach, and a change in defensive tactics to offensive strategies, has been effective in countering the Maoist insurgency in the region. He also coordinated the construction of fast tracked roads, which are considered an import factor in dealing with the Maoists.

=== Chief Secretary of Jammu and Kashmir ===
In August 2020, B. V. R. Subrahmanyam, while speaking to some journalists, had said that "J&K was a 'broken state' — the governance was broken badly, there was no system, no rules, and decay began a long time ago. Not a single soul had cried over detention of political and separatist leaders in August last year, when Centre scrapped J&K’s status". He drew a lot of flak for this from politicians in Kashmir, including the Jammu and Kashmir Apni Party who asked the Chief Secretary to remain "apolitical". Under Subrahmanyam, the first year of the Union Territory of Jammu and Kashmir oversaw the funding of 2,273 infrastructure projects worth Rs 5,979 crore, which had been pending for the past 5–10 years, were sanctioned and 506 completed.

=== CEO of NITI Aayog ===
Subramanyam is the CEO of NITI Aayog, the policy think tank of the Government of India. In his role, he has been instrumental in shaping various initiatives and policies to drive India's growth and development. One significant program he unveiled is the "Growth Hub" initiative, aimed at tapping the economic potential of 20 Indian cities to drive urban growth. This program is designed to foster collaboration between cities, enhance competitiveness, and promote sustainable urban development. Subramanyam's leadership at NITI Aayog reflects a commitment to innovative governance and strategic planning, aligning with the broader goals of the Indian government to achieve inclusive growth and sustainable development.

=== G20 meetings ===
Subramanyam, as the CEO of NITI Aayog, played a significant role in the discussions related to the G20 meetings, focusing on green and sustainable growth for the global economy. Subramanyam's involvement in these discussions underscores his role in shaping India's stance on global economic and environmental issues, contributing to the India's active participation in international forums like the G20.
