= Sachin Garg =

Indian novelist (born 1986)

- Garg in 2016
- Education: Delhi College of Engineering, Management Development Institute
- Occupations: Author, publisher, entrepreneur, speaker
- Years active: 2008–present
- Employer: Grapevine India Pvt. Ltd. (founder)
- Website: www.grapevineindia.com

Sachin Garg is an Indian novelist, entrepreneur, publisher and speaker, best known for his semi-autobiographical chronicles. He has authored bestsellers like Never Let Me Go, It's First Love, Just Like The Last One, I'm Not Twenty Four, I Have Been Nineteen For Five Years, Come on, inner peace, I don't have all day.

== His work ==
His most recent work We Need A Revolution, released in February 2016, is stated to be a marked change from his previous college fiction romance genre of writing.

== Books ==
- We need a Revolution, ISBN 9789381841860 when opposites meet-2017
- Come On, Inner Peace: I Don't Have All Day!, ISBN 9789381841303
- Never Let Me Go..., ISBN 9789381841006
- I'm Not Twenty Four... I've Been Nineteen for Five Years..., ISBN 9788192222622
- It's First Love!: ...Just Like The Last One!, ISBN 9788192222660
