= Parameswaran Iyer =

Indian civil servant (born 1959)

Parameswaran Iyer, IAS (Retd.)
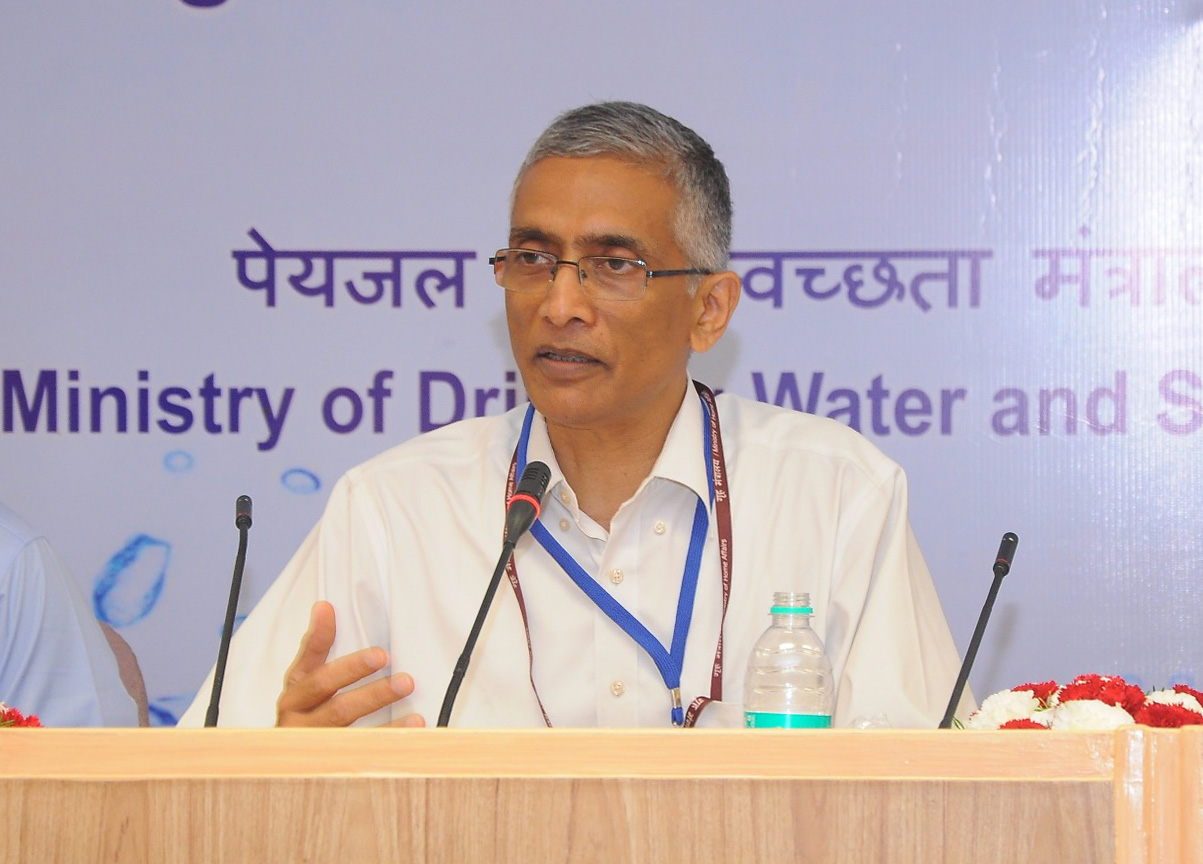

3rd CEO of NITI Aayog
- In office 1 July 2022 – 28 February 2023
- Preceded by: Amitabh Kant
- Succeeded by: B. V. R. Subrahmanyam

Personal details
- Born: 16 April 1959 (age 67) Srinagar, Jammu and Kashmir, India
- Education: The Doon School, Dehradun; (B.A.) St. Stephen's College, Delhi Delhi University (MBA) Management Development Institute
- Occupation: retired IAS officer Civil servant
- Known for: Leading the Swachh Bharat Mission

Parameswaran Iyer (born 16 April 1959) is a retired 1981 batch IAS officer of Uttar Pradesh cadre who was the CEO of NITI Aayog from 2022 to 2023 and an executive director at the World Bank Group representin India, Bangladesh, Bhutan, and Sri Lanka from 2023 to 2026.

In 2016, he was appointed by the government to lead the Swachh Bharat Mission.

== Early life ==
Parameswaran was born in Srinagar to Air Marshal P. V. Iyer (Retd) and Kalyani. He was educated at The Doon School in Dehradun, he completed bachelor's degree from St Stephen's College, Delhi University and MBA from National Management Programme of Management Development Institute in Gurgaon. As a student of St. Stephen’s College he represented India at the Junior Davis Cup in Tennis. He then got a one-year exchange scholarship at Davidson College in North Carolina.

== Career ==
Iyer joined the Indian Administrative Service in 1981. In 2009, he took a voluntary retirement to become the water resources manager at the World Bank. At the World Bank he worked in China, Vietnam, Egypt, Lebanon and Washington, D.C.

In 2016, he joined the Ministry of Drinking Water and Sanitation, Government of India, and was appointed by Prime Minister Modi to spearhead the Swachh Bharat Mission and Sanitation and water Management campaigns related to it.

He also was a Professor of Management Practices at Indian Institute of Management (IIM), Ahmedabad.

He has been a columnist with the Indian Express.

=== Swacch Bharat Mission ===
In 2016, he was appointed by the Government of India to implement Swachh Bharat Mission, the country-wide sanitation campaign to eliminate open defecation and improve solid waste management. Iyer's modus operandi to achieve the strict goals under the mission (building 110 million toilets in 5 years) was unconventional and "non-bureaucratic" which increased efficiency and delivery and led to the success of the program.

In 2019, India was declared as Open defecation free on Mahatma Gandhi's 150th birthday Anniversary. India built 100 million toilets in about 0.6 million villages, and another 6.3 million in its cities. A UNICEF study estimated that a household in an ODF village saves an average of up to Rs 50,000 annually on such expenses as treatment of illnesses. The biggest success of the program was to bring behavioural change at grassroot level through awareness campaigns and mass contact programmes.

During his stint at the Ministry of Drinking Water and Sanitation, Iyer had entered a twin-pit toilet to empty it at a Telangana village in 2017 to help residents overcome the taboo of cleaning toilets. Prime Minister Narendra Modi had called the act remarkable during one of his Mann Ki Baat programmes.

The Prime Minister singled him out for praise on another occasion, at a function addressing ‘Swachh Bharat Mission’ volunteers in Bihar’s Champaran in 2018.

Jal Jeevan Mission

He was also given the additional charge of another of the Prime Minister’s pet project, the Jal Jeevan Mission, with the goal of providing piped water supply to all households by 2024 through integrated water supply management at the grassroots.

In 2020, Iyer had resigned from the position and returned to the United States to join the World Bank and be close to his family.

He was the CEO and Manager of the 2030 Water Resources Group, a public-private-civil society partnership hosted by the World Bank, Washington DC.

In 2022, he returned to Indian Administration as the head of Government of India's apex think tank NITI Aayog.

In 2023 he was nominated as an Executive Director of World Bank by India.

== Bibliography ==
- Iyer, Parameswaran (2021). Method in the Madness. Harper Collins. ISBN 978-9390327560.
- Iyer, Parameswaran (2019). The Swachh Bharat Revolution: Four Pillars of India's Behavioural Transformation. Harper Collins. ISBN 978-9353572679.
