= Subhash Chandra Agrawal =

Indian businessman (born 1950)

- Born: 10 January 1950 (age 76); Delhi
- Education: Delhi Technological University; Faculty of Management Studies – University of Delhi
- Occupations: businessman, RTI activist
- Spouse: Madhu
- Parents: Om Prakash Agrawal; Padmawati
- Awards: National RTI Award

Subhash Chandra Agrawal (born 10 January 1950) is an Indian businessman and right to information activist. He holds the Guinness World Record for having written the most published letters to newspaper editors.

== Early life and education ==
Subhash Chandra Agrawal was born on 10 January 1950 in Delhi to Om Prakash Agrawal and Padmawati. He finished his schooling from Anglo Sanskrit Victoria Jubilee Senior Secondary School, Daryaganj. He attended Delhi College of Engineering (now Delhi Technological University) where he graduated with a Bachelor of Science (mechanical engineering). He earned his post-graduate diploma in marketing and sales management from Faculty of Management Studies, University of Delhi. He wanted to join the Indian Administrative Services (IAS), but his uncle "forced [him] to join the family business, [and] crushed [his] dreams of becoming an IAS officer".

== Letters and right to information ==
Agrawal wrote his first letter to the editor of the Hindi newspaper Dainik Hindustan about a bus conductor of Delhi Transport Corporation who did not issue tickets but asked passengers to pay for them. He then raised concerns about the irregular timings of the Taj Express with the Ministry of Railways. He had written 3,699 such published letters as of 31 January 2006, which is a Guinness World Records entry "for the most published letters written to newspaper editors over an individual's lifetime".

He has utilised the Right to Information Act (RTI Act) as a tool to combat corruption in India. The Central Information Commissioner brought the office of Chief Justice of India under the purview of the RTI Act after Agrawal's application. This decision was subsequently upheld by the High Court of Delhi in 2010 and the Supreme Court of India in 2019.

=== Controversy ===
Agrawal has been criticised for overuse of RTI instead of pressuring authorities into putting information on their websites without resorting to CIC. But other activists feel that Agrawal’s impact outweighs the criticism he attracts.

== Personal life ==
Agarwal is married to Madhu Agarwal, a social worker who herself holds the Guinness World Record for having written the most published letters (447) in newspapers in a calendar year (2004). His wife and nephew help him by sharing their ideas. Subhash Agrawal reads six newspapers daily and watches news on television, but not cricket. He lives in Dariba, Chandni Chowk, Delhi.
