= Jagdish Swaminathan =

Indian painter (1928–1994)

- Born: 21 June 1928; Shimla, Punjab Province
- Died: 25 April 1994 (aged 65)
- Known for: Painting

Jagdish Swaminathan (21 June 1928 – 25 April 1994) popularly known as J. Swaminathan was an Indian artist, painter, poet and writer. He played a role in the establishment of the Bharat Bhawan, a multi-art complex in Bhopal, in 1982, and served as the director of its Roopankar Art Museum till 1990. He discovered Jangarh Singh Shyam, a Gond tribal artist of Madhya Pradesh. He was a member of the Communist Party of India.

== Biography ==
Swaminathan was born in Shimla on 21 June 1928. After schooling in Delhi, he joined a pre-medical course, but left the course and his home to run away to Kolkata, where he did odd jobs to earn living. He subsequently returned to Delhi and was appointed sub-editor of a Hindi short story magazine, and subsequently editor of Mazdoor Awaz magazine. Initially a member of the Congress Socialist Party, he joined the Communist Party of India in 1948.

He started taking evening classes at the Delhi Polytechnic, Kashmere Gate, training under artists Sailoz Mukherjee and Bhabesh Chandra Sanyal. However, he soon quit his art classes, unable to manage the stress of working during the day and attending art classes in the evenings. In 1957, he joined the Academy of Fine Arts in Warsaw. Upon his return to India in 1960, he held his first major exhibition, displaying his graphic prints and oil paintings alongside artists P. K. Razadan and N. Dixit. By the end of 1960s, he had left journalism to take up art full-time.

Swaminathan was one of twelve co-founders of the short-lived artist group Group 1890 founded in Bhavnagar, Gujarat, in August 1962. Other members of the group included Ghulam Mohammed Sheikh, Eric Bowen, and Jyoti Bhatt. Swaminathan was awarded the Jawaharlal Nehru Fellowship in 1968 for research on "The significance of the traditional Numan to Contemporary Art".

Swaminathan was active in helping vernacular painters from tribes such as Gond and Bhil to gain international recognition. In 1981, he discovered the young Gond artist Jangarh Singh Shyam painting on the mud walls of his house, who became the first known modern Gond artist. Recognizing his talent, Swaminathan took him to the city and held exhibitions of Shyam's paintings. Shyam soon gained international recognition and his paintings were included in exhibitions in Japan, the United Kingdom and the United States. Swaminathan also helped establish Bharat Bhawan, a multi-art complex in Bhopal, established in 1982, and the collection of tribal art housed at the museum.

In 2007, an Untitled work by Swaminathan was auctioned at Christie's for $312,000.

== Bibliography ==
- J. Swaminathan, by Krishen Khanna. Lalit Kala Akademi, 1995.
- Transits of a Wholetimer: J. Swaminathan : Years 1950-69, J. Swaminathan, S. Kalidas. Gallery Espace Art, 2012. ISBN 819085044X.
- ' 'O trapo e a faca - poesia, pintura e pensamento na obra de J. Swaminathan' ' by Lúcia Fabrini de Almeida. São Paulo: Terceira Margem, 2017 ISBN 9788579211003
