= Eric Bowen =

Indian artist (1929–2002)

- Born: 1929; Allahabad, United Provinces of Agra and Oudh, British India
- Died: 2002 (aged 72–73)
- Education: Delhi Polytechnic

Eric Hubert Bowen (1929–2002) was an Indian artist known for his abstract art. Born in Allahabad (now known as Prayagraj), United Provinces of Agra and Oudh (present-day Uttar Pradesh) in 1929, he received a national diploma in art from Delhi Polytechnic (now known as Delhi Technological University) in 1959. He, along with Paramjit Singh, founded Group Unknown, a group of young artists and sculptors based in Delhi. He studied art in Italy from 1962 to 1965 through a scholarship by the Italian government. He was a part of the Group 1890 exhibition held in the year 1963, but was not present personally because of being in Italy.

Bowen received a state sponsorship for study and travel from the Norwegian government in 1977, and settled with his wife in Oslo. He worked on "The Right to Life in Peace", a series of twelve paintings based on concerns about wars and violence, in 1985. The series includes quotations from Rabindranath Tagore, Sankichi Toge, etc. He received a grant from the Royal Norwegian Ministry of Foreign Affairs for this series and it was exhibited in the United Nations Office at Geneva. Bowen is one of the subjects of the book Memory and Identity: Indian Artists Abroad. He died in the year 2002.

Bowen's artistic style was initially inspired by construction and architecture, consisting of geometric structures like lines, two-dimensional and three-dimensional spaces. However, during his stay in Oslo, he switched to a tantra-inspired style which includes tribal and folk art elements and consists of triangular and spherical shapes. His works are part of the collections of the National Gallery, the Smithsonian Institution, and the National Gallery of Modern Art.
