= Group 1890 =

New Delhi art exhibition (1963)

GROUP 1890
- Date: October 20–29, 1963
- Venue: Lalit Kala Akademi, Rabindra Bhavan
- Location: New Delhi India

The GROUP 1890 exhibition was held from 20 to 29 October 1963 at Lalit Kala Akademi, Rabindra Bhavan in New Delhi, India. It was the only exhibition of the artist collective 'group 1890', hence the only existing record of the group's exhibition history in the 1960s contemporary art in India. The group was an entirely male association with 12 members which 'stood passionately and romantically for values of modernism that signaled change'. The members were Raghav Kaneria, M. Reddeppa Naidu, Ambadas Khobragade, Rajesh Mehra, Gulam Mohammed Sheikh, Jagdish Swaminathan, Himmat Shah, Jeram Patel, S. G. Nikam, Eric Bowen, Jyoti Bhatt, and Balkrishna Patel. All of which participated in this inaugural exhibition.

A meeting of the artist group was held from 12 to 14 May 1967 in Baroda to discuss the possibility of having their second exhibition which did not eventually materialise. Geeta Kapur, the noted female art historian, critic, and curator based in New Delhi, was involved in the said meeting and was captured among the male artists in two photographs collected in the Gulammohammed Sheikh Archive, part of The Baroda Archives digitalised by Asia Art Archive.

== The exhibition ==
The GROUP 1890 exhibition was dedicated to the memory of Georges Braque and was inaugurated by the then Prime Minister Sri Jawaharlal Nehru. It presented 8 to 10 works from each of the 12 artists. Artworks on display included oil paintings, drawings, collages, prints, and sculptures.

The exhibition was conceptualised as a ground to showcase the members' artistic creation and as a chance to make the group's manifesto public. A full-page manifesto and an introductory article titled 'Surrounded by Infinity...' written by the surrealist poet Octavio Paz on 12 October 1963 in New Delhi was included in the exhibition catalogue, along with the artist biographies.

Octavio Paz, the then Mexican Ambassador to India, claimed in the introductory article that the artist collective 'group 1890' signified a will of change and freedom in the field of contemporary art in 1960s India. There he wrote, '...1890, which pretends not to be a school, is a movement. A movement which affirms itself as a will of change...The creative act is based upon a radical criticism. Criticism of the world and criticism of the artist and his means of expression...I affirm that this exhibition is one sign of the new time, a time that will be of criticism as well as creation. Something precious is being born with these artists.'

He went on to interpret the spirit of 'group 1890' movement as avant-garde and the inaugural exhibition as a mean to challenge the binary conception of tradition and contemporaneity, 'It is not difficult to find in the works of this exhibition the echoes, the prolongations and influences of universal contemporary painting. These young men, with a full conscience, have grasped modern language. Who will draw to reproach them? There is no other language, it is the only one alive. And how not to see the frequency with which that language ceases to be a prescription and becomes a sign of self? Furthermore, what is called tradition is nothing else but an ensemble or succession of works. That is, of inventions and variations on those inventions, contemplated from an ever-changing point of view: the present. Even if art critics and historians feel themselves installed in eternity. Tradition: change. 1890: breakthrough and restart.'

A review of the GROUP 1890 exhibition written by Charles Fabri, Hungarian Archaeologist and Art Historian in India, was published in The Statesman on 21 October 1963

== group 1890 ==
The term 'group 1890' was used to describe both the exhibition title, the artist collective, and a movement these artists provoked. 'group 1890' as an artist collective has 12 members, mainly artists from Delhi and Bombay. Many of them were graduated from the University of Baroda and were in their early 30s when the GROUP 1890 exhibition was held at Lalit Kala Akademi. The group was described as progressive and against the Bengal School. Some of the members continued their art practice after the group was disintegrated. These artists became respected names in the field of contemporary art in India.

This artist collective was the brain child of Jagdish Swaminathan and formed in a meeting of artists held at Bhavnagar on 25–26 August 1962. The name 'group 1890' was derived from the number of the house of J. Pandya, where the artists gathered and drafted their manifesto. The 1962 Bhavnagar meeting "was the outcome of prolonged discussions through personal meetings and correspondence over a period of two years between like-minded artists on the situation existing in modern Indian art. Having come to a common understanding regarding the vitiating influences which hinder the unfolding of authentic development in art, it was decided to launch the group 1890 movement."

The group's manifesto was discussed at the Bhavnagar meeting and later adopted in New Delhi on 19 July 1963, a few months before the group's inaugural exhibition.

== Members ==
All 12 members of 'group 1890' participated in this exhibition. They were:

- Raghav Kaneria
- M. Reddeppa Naidu
- Ambadas Khobragade
- Rajesh Mehra
- Gulam Mohammed Sheikh
- Jagdish Swaminathan
- Himmat Shah
- Jeram Patel
- S. G. Nikam
- Eric Hubert Bowen
- Jyoti Bhatt
- Balkrishna Patel

=== Raghav Kaneria ===
Sculptor. Born 1936; Diploma in Sculpture from the M.S. University of Baroda; Government of India Cultural Scholar (1960–62). Exhibitions: National Exhibition of Art (Award, 1959 and 1963); Bombay Art Society (Gold Medal, 1962 and several other prizes); Bombay State Art Exhibition (Tamra Patra, 1959 and 1960); Indian Sculptor's Association (Prize, 1960); All-India Fine Arts and Crafts Society (Silver Medal, 1961); Gujarat Sanskritik Samaroh (First Prize, 1961); Gujarat State Art Exhibition (First Prize, 1962); Paris Biennale (1962); Commonwealth Art Exhibition (1961). Collection: Lalit Kala Akademi.

=== M. Reddeppa NAIDU (Naidu) ===
Painter. Born 1932; Diploma in Painting, Government School of Arts & Crafts, Madras (1960); Government of India Cultural Scholar for advanced studies in Painting. Exhibitions: Participated in several group shows including Five Young South Indian Painters, 1957 (USIS, Madras); South Indian Society of Painters, 1958 (Award); Congress Exhibitions (Madras) 1960 and 1961 (Award), annual exhibition of the Bombay Art Society, 1961 (Prize) and Hyderabad Art Society (Prize); regular participant in the National Exhibition of Art, held one-man show, 1958 (Ootacammund); Member, Progressive Painters Association; Represented in the collection of the Lalit Kala Akademi. National Award, 1962.

=== Ambadas Khobragade ===
Born 1922; G.D. Art form Sir J.J. School of Arts, Bombay in 1952; one of the sponsoring members of the Group 'Non-Representational' actively participating in all its exhibitions since 1959; two-man show in Delhi, 1961; employed in the All-India Handloom Board, Delhi.

=== Rajesh Mehra ===
Diploma in Fine Arts from the Art Department of the Delhi Polytechnic, 1955; exhibited in various group shows, national exhibitions; represented in Paris Biennale 1961, Tokyo International Exhibition of Young Painters, 1957, and in the National Exhibitions held by the Lalit Kala Akademi; is represented in the Lalit Kala collection; was Secretary of the Delhi Silpi Chakra in 1961-1962; was lecturer in painting at the Art Department of the Delhi Polytechnic.

=== Gulam Mohammed Sheikh ===
Born 1937; obtained master's degree in Fine Arts (1961) from the M.S. University of Baroda and later joined the staff of the Faculty of Fine Arts. Held one-man shows in Bombay (1961 and 1963); Participated in several important exhibitions in Bombay, Delhi, Calcutta; regular exhibitor in the group shows of the Baroda Group of which he was Acting Secretary. National Akademi award: 1962; was in English on a Commonwealth scholarship.

=== Jagdish Swaminathan ===
Born 1928; studied painting in Delhi and Warsaw; works in oils as well as in graphic media; has had a chequered career working variously as a journalist in Hindi and English, as a writer of stories for children and as an art critic; has participated in group shows, in the National Exhibition of Art and in the First International Exhibition Saigon, the International Exhibition of Graphics, Poland and several other shows; held one-man show in December 1962; represented in the Lalit Kala Akademi collection and in the National Gallery of Modern Art, New Delhi; was Senior Art Teacher, Cambridge School, New Delhi.

=== Himmat Shah ===
Born 1933, Bhavnagar (Saurashtra); initial training in painting under Shri Jogubhai Shah and later studied of the Drawing Teacher's Course of the Government of Bombay and works as drawing teacher for a few years; studied under Prof. Bender in the Faculty of Fine Arts, M.S. University of Baroda; was Government of India Scholar for advanced studies in Painting. Exhibitions: National Exhibition of Art (Award, 1960 and 1962); Jammu and Kashmir Akademi of Art (Award, 1960); Bombay Art Society (Award, 1960).

=== Jeram Patel ===
Born 1930; Studied Painting and Applied Arts at Sir J.J. School of Art, Bombay; got a First Class Diploma and Fellowship in 1955; travelled to England, France and Japan; studied Typography and Publicity Design at the Central School of Arts and Crafts, London and got the National Diploma in Design in 1959; One-man shows: 1959 London, Woodstock Gallery, Bond Street; 1960 New Delhi (Private Studio); 1962 New Delhi Kunika Art Centre; 1962 New Delhi Shridharani Gallery; 1963 Kunika Art Centre. Has exhibited in the International Exhibitions in Tokyo and Manila; represented at the Tokyo Biennale, 1963 and São Paulo Biennale, 1963; also exhibited in All-India Exhibitions organised by the Government of India, Private Societies, Galleries, Cultural Groups. a member of the Baroda Group, and Secretary of Progressive Painters, Ahmedabad; represented in The National Gallery of Modern Art, New Delhi, Art Society of India, Bombay, Lalit Kala Academi, New Delhi, Sir J.J. Institute of Applied Art, Bombay, Kunika Art Centre, New Delhi, Vastu Shilpa, Ahmedadad/ Also in private collections in London, Paris, Tokyo, Philippines, and Germany. had several prizes and scholarships including National Awards in 1957 and 1963 from the Lalit Kala Academy. was a Reader in Applied Arts, Faculty of Fine Arts, Baroda University and Graphic Designer, National Institute for Industrial Design, Ahmedabad and Reader in Visual Design at School of Architecture, Ahmedabad. was Deputy Director at the Weaver's Service, Centre All India Handloom Board, New Delhi.

=== S. G. Nikam ===
Born 1931, Malwan (Bombay); G.D. Art from the Sir J.J. School of Arts, Bombay in 1954. Participated in the Annual exhibitions from the Bombay Art Society from time to time; joint exhibition in 1958; from 1959 onwards sponsored a group of four young painters calling themselves 'Non-Representational' and put up exhibitions jointly almost very year. employed in the All-India Handloom Board, Bombay.

=== Eric Hubert Bowen ===
Studied in the Art Department of the Delhi Polytechnic and did his diploma in painting in 1959; participated in numerous group shows and has held three solo shows in Delhi; participating regularly with 'The Unknown' group—a group of young painters of Delhi—of which he was President in 1961; participated in the National Exhibition of Art and annual shows of the AIFACS; studied in Rome on an Italian government scholarship.

=== Jyoti Bhatt ===
Born 1934; Diploma in Painting in M.S. University of Baroda (1944), post Diploma specialisation (1956); studied mural painting at Vanasthali Vidyapith, Jaipur (1953); he was Government of India Cultural Scholar; staff of the Faculty of Fine Arts, M.S. University; recipient of the Italian government scholarship (1961–62). Exhibitions: National Exhibition of Art (Gold plaque 1956, award 1963), Hyderabad Art Society (Prize, 1953), Bombay Art Society (Prize, 1955, 1956), 20 Artists Exhibition (New Delhi, 1959), Paris Biennale (1959). Collection: Lalit Kala Academi and the National Gallery of Modern Art. Founding member, Baroda Group.

=== Balkrishna Patel ===
Balkrishna Patel was born in Ahmedabad in 1925 and he studied painting under the tutelage of Ravishanker Rawal at Ahmedabad and Prof. N.S. Bendre at the aculty of fine Arts M.S.University, Baroda. Patel was also part of the group 1980, and exhibited in the groups only exhibition in 1963.

The current body of Patels paintings is minimalist, almost as if less is more for the artist. Patels the line to its optimum, he uses it sparingly but the impact he creates by the negative space is powerful. Patel also uses color sparingly, only a hint of it, as not wanting to burden the paintings.

Horse and women or the figure of the woman seem occupy the artists current repertoire. Both have strong symbolic implications, the horse a symbol of power, strength has been used in the realm of art since time immemorial, every artist has at some time or the other painted it, but what sets Patel's rendition of the horse apart is that he seems to be cajoling the viewer into rethinking about the associated symbolism of the animal. By putting the two, horse and woman together he seems to be balancing the 2 life forces, the male and the female, the yin and the yang. Though his line of thought is more serene, both are at peace with themselves and not wrought with intensions. They are at times playful and dancing to the love song of life. The woman is sometimes seen astride, at times the horse is beckoning her to an unknown land, coaxing her to explore the world. At times he seems to be enthralled by her.

Patel has won several awards including the Merit Award, Lalit Kala Akadami (1957), Merit Award, Bombay Art Society,(1957), National Award, (1969, 1978), Gujarat Rajya Lalit Kala Award,(1993). Patel has showing his works in solo exhibitions at the Jahangir Art Gallery (1959) Dhoomimal Art Gallery, (1965,1988) Gallery Chemould, Mumbai, (1969,1971,1972) Gallery Chemould New Delhi, 1971 Contemporary Art Gallery, Ahmedabad, (1974,1976,1987, Art Heritage, Delhi, (1993) And has also participated in several group shows in India and Abroad His works can be found in the permanent collection of National Gallery of Modern Art, Lalit Kala Akademi, Roopankar Museum, Bhopal.

== See also ==
- Baroda Group
- Bombay Progressive Artists' Group
- Calcutta Group
