= FirstCry =

Indian e-commerce company

- Company type: Public
- Traded as: NSE: FIRSTCRY; BSE: 544226
- Industry: Consumer goods
- Founded: November 2010; 15 years ago
- Founders: Supam Maheshwari; Amitava Saha
- Headquarters: Pune, Maharashtra, India
- Area served: India; Middle East
- Key people: Supam Maheshwari (CEO)
- Revenue: ▲₹6,481 crore (US$680 million) (FY24)
- Net income: ▼₹−321 crore (US$−33 million) (FY24)
- Owners: SoftBank (25.5%); Mahindra & Mahindra (10.98%); Premji Invest (10.36%)
- Number of employees: 2,000+ (2021)
- Website: www.firstcry.com

BrainBees Solutions Limited, doing business as FirstCry, is an Indian multinational retail company, focused on infant, maternity and children's products. The company was founded in 2010 and is headquartered in Pune. It sells products through its website, mobile app and over 1,000 stores, which operate under FirstCry and BabyHug brands.

== History ==
In November 2010, Supam Maheshwari and Amitava Saha launched FirstCry.com as an online retailer of babycare, maternity care and kids products. In 2011, the company entered offline retail through franchise-owned stores, starting from Tier-2 and Tier-3 cities and towns.

In 2013, FirstCry launched its private label clothing brand called BabyHug. In 2015, the company reported having distribution partnerships with over 5,000 hospitals.

In 2016, FirstCry acquired BabyOye, owned by the Mahindra Group, for ₹362 crore (US$53.87 million) in a stock swap transaction. The merged entity had over 300 stores and did business under the name "FirstCry.com - a FirstCry Mahindra Venture".

In 2019, the company acquired playschool company Oi Playschool.

FirstCry began operating in the United Arab Emirates in 2019 and Saudi Arabia in 2022.

FirstCry listed on the Bombay Stock Exchange and National Stock Exchange on 13 August 2024, following an initial public offering.

In June 2025, an insolvency plea was filed against FirstCry's subsidiary, GlobalBees, by former stakeholders.

== Funding ==
FirstCry raised $4 million in funding from SAIF Partners in April 2011, followed by $14 million from IDG Ventures and SAIF Partners in February 2012.

In January 2014, FirstCry raised $15 million led by Vertex Venture Holdings, a subsidiary of Temasek Holdings. It closed its Series D round of funding of $36 million in April 2015, with investments from New Enterprise Associates, Valiant Capital Partners and existing investors.

Between 2019 and 2020, FirstCry raised $400 million from SoftBank in its series E round of financing.

In 2021, FirstCry raised ₹95 crore ($13 million) in an equity funding round from pi Ventures.
