= Vinod Dham =

Indian engineer

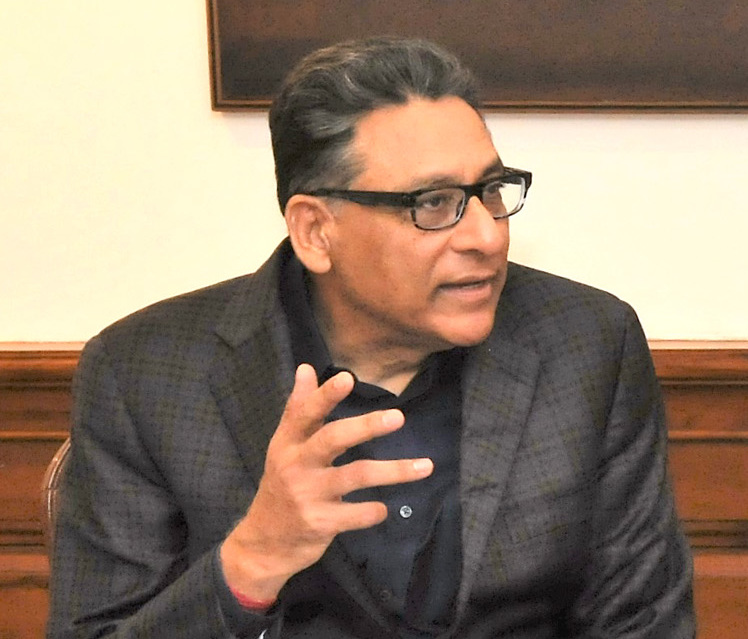
- Born: 1950 (age 75–76); Pune, Maharashtra, India
- Citizenship: India
- Education: B.E., Delhi College of Engineering (Delhi Technological University); MS, University of Cincinnati
- Awards: Padma Bhushan (2025)

Vinod Dham is an Indian-American engineer, entrepreneur, and venture capitalist. He is also a mentor and advisor, and sits on the boards of companies, including startups funded through his India-based fund Indo-US Venture Partners, where he is the founding managing director.

Vinod Dham's accomplishments as a technology pioneer from Silicon Valley were observed at an exhibition on South Asians at the National Museum of Natural History, highlighting Indian-Americans who have helped shape America.

In 2025, the Indian government honoured Vinod Dham with the Padma Bhushan, India's third-highest civilian award.

== Early life ==
Vinod Dham was born in 1950 in Pune, India. His father was a member of the army civilian department who had moved from Rawalpindi, Punjab, Pakistan, to India during the Partition of India.

Dham graduated with a BE degree in Electrical Engineering from Delhi College of Engineering in 1971 at the age of 21. At the age of 25, he left his family in Delhi, India, to study for an MS degree in Physics (Solid State) in the US, arriving with $8. He is married to Sadhana and has two sons. He has three brothers and a sister.

== Career ==
After completing a BE degree in Electrical Engineering in 1971, Dham joined Delhi-based semiconductor manufacturer Continental Devices, one of India's early private silicon semiconductor start-ups, which collaborated with Teradyne Semiconductor Company, USA. He was a part of the early team that put together a facility in Delhi, where he worked for four years. It was while he worked at this company that he developed an interest in the physics of semiconductor devices.

In 1975, he left this job and went to the University of Cincinnati in Ohio to pursue an MS degree in Physics (Solid-State). After completing his MS degree in 1977, he joined NCR Corporation in Dayton, Ohio, as an engineer, working on advanced non-volatile memories. His work helped NCR get a patent in 1985 on a mixed dielectric process and non-volatile memory device.

During a presentation of his work on non-volatile memory for NCR Microelectronics at an IEEE workshop, he was approached by Intel and joined the company in 1979 as an engineer. He initially worked with the non-volatile memory team and was a co-inventor of Intel's first flash memory technology (ETOX). He later moved to the micro-processor division, where he worked on two earlier generations of micro-processors—Intel's 80386 and 80486. He subsequently was a project manager on the Pentium processor. At the time he started managing the Pentium project, several consortia were developing RISC (Reduced Instruction Set Computing) processors that threatened Intel's dominance. In a Business Week cover story on Intel's new processors, Dham was quoted as General Manager of the 586 processor group (586 was the internal name for the project until it was named 'Pentium' at launch). He rose to the position of Vice President of the Microprocessor Group at Intel.

He left Intel in 1995 and joined the startup NexGen, which was subsequently acquired by AMD. Dham played a key role in the launch of the K6 processor at rival AMD. He held the position of vice president of AMD's computation products group. He then went on to lead a startup, Silicon Spice, in April 1998, which he re-directed to build a VOIP chip and sold it to Broadcom in 2000. He then launched an incubator, NewPath Ventures, where he co-founded companies with the objective of using India's emerging talent in chip design for R&D. He later became the managing director and founder of Indo-US Venture Partners, an early-stage India-focused fund that he founded after NewPath. Dham has, over the years, been a board member and technical advisor to dozens of private and public companies worldwide.

== Entrepreneurial career ==
=== NexGen ===
In 1995, Dham left Intel and joined a company called NexGen, an eight-year-old boutique processor design company, as COO. Dham changed NexGen's strategy, realizing the company needed to license intellectual property (IP) and partner with established players for manufacturing. Dham facilitated a partnership with Advanced Micro Devices (AMD), which subsequently acquired NexGen's product and process technology for $857 million. AMD's next product, the K6, was built using NexGen's core technology and competed with Intel's Pentium processor. AMD, under Dham's leadership in the microprocessor business, priced the K6 to enable the creation of sub-$1000 PCs, a move that forced Intel to initially respond with a truncated Pentium under the brand name Celeron. After spending a year at AMD following the NexGen acquisition, Dham joined another startup in April 1998, Silicon Spice, as CEO and president.

=== Silicon Spice ===
Dham became interested in communications processors. With demand for communications-related chips growing at 20% per annum, Dham and Silicon Spice's three MIT-graduate co-founders raised more than $34 million in VC funding from New Enterprise Associates and Kleiner, Perkins, Caufield & Byers.

Silicon Spice was initially experimenting with using an innovative reconfigurable technology to design chips. It turned out that the chips designed in this fashion lacked the necessary performance and cost to be of much commercial use. Dham learned from dealing with customers that there was an emerging need for chips that could effectively transfer voice over the Internet. He re-directed the company to build a chip to support VoIP (Voice over Internet Protocol). In August 2000, Dham sold Silicon Spice to Broadcom for $1.2 billion in an all-stock deal. The deal was Broadcom's largest ever at the time. Broadcom's former CEO, Henry Nicholas, stated that Silicon Spice's architecture for communications processors opened a multi-billion-dollar opportunity in carrier-class communication equipment.

== Mentor and venture capitalist ==
In December 2001, Dham made a trip to India, where he met with several businesses. With seed capital from other venture capitalists in April 2002, he co-founded the incubator New Path Ventures. It invested in chip and system design companies like Telsima (WiMAX chips), Montalvo Systems (low-power chips), Silica (chips for multimedia and digital printing processors), and Nevis (secure networking) with development teams in India for markets in the U.S. These start-ups were subsequently acquired. Having learned that opportunities for venture-backed startups in India would likely revolve more around services required to meet the needs of India's growing consumer class, Dham subsequently co-founded NEA Indo-US Ventures, a cross-border, India-focused fund, in 2006. The firm was later rebranded as Indo-US Venture Partners (IUVP). Dham runs IUVP with his two Bengaluru-based investment partners. IUVP's focus has been on investing in Indian companies across sectors including mobile technology, knowledge process outsourcing, internet, education and healthcare.

== Philanthropy ==
Dham and his wife, Sadhana, are donors to charities in the US and India. He has been a trustee of the American India Foundation (AIF) since 2001. Former President Bill Clinton serves as the honorary chair. In July 2006, he was named to the Board of Directors and was appointed Chair of the Digital Equaliser (DE) Program, with a mission to provide underprivileged children in India with the opportunity to enhance their learning through the use of digital technology in a scalable and sustainable manner. He was awarded the Visionary Award for his DE work by Montek Singh Ahluwalia in 2010.

== Recognition ==
- In 1993, Dham was named one of the Top 25 Executives in the US Computer Industry.
- In 1999, he was named one of the top 100 Most Influential Asian Americans of the decade.
- In 2000, he was appointed to serve on the President's Advisory Commission on Asian Americans and Pacific Islanders by President Bill Clinton.
- Dham was awarded the NRI Achievement Award at the NRI Global Summit in October 2009 by the NRI Institute, a New Delhi–based nonprofit.
- Dham was profiled among the first and notable Indian American Achievers by the HomeSpun: Smithsonian Indian American Heritage Project, which chronicles the story of immigrants from India and their descendants in America.
- On 22 April 2011, Dham was given the People's Choice Award and Special Jury Award in the category of Science and Technology by the Times of India Group's 'Light of India Awards', recognising Indian achievers abroad.
- On 13 November 2014, Dham was honoured with the 'Lifetime Accomplishments Award' by VC Taskforce, a Silicon Valley–based organisation.
- In 2025, he was awarded the Padma Bhushan by the Government of India.

== Quotes ==
- "The best thing that happened to me was joining Intel and the best thing that happened to me was leaving Intel."
- "Electrons move at the same speed whether at Intel or AMD."
- "You know, if you are here in Silicon Valley 10 to 15 years and you have not stepped out and done a startup, there's something wrong with you."
- "Speed was God for us when we designed Pentium. All we did was to build the fastest BMW or Lamborghini equivalent of a chip, and you were a hero. Now, its more like building an efficient Prius or a Nano. It may not go very fast but consumes less power. A total paradigm shift has occurred in the chip industry. It is evident with the ARM chips, being used to build new devices. These chips may not run as fast but they can run your iPad or netbook for weeks. That wasn't the case in the 80s and 90s."
- "To stay globally competitive the nation must do better at steering its youth toward engineering careers."
- "More and more, Sand Hill Road (a key location for VCs in Silicon Valley) money is moving to India. It's clear India's time has come."
- "There is nothing except maybe Excel spreadsheets that you can't do on a cell phone. You can do mails, SMS, MMS. You can do photo sharing. You can find the nearest restaurant. You can't do the latter on a laptop. It's a far richer medium. You will see a lot of big screens in the home and a cell phone won't compete with that. But the ubiquitous device that you won't leave home without is the cell phone. In India, when they're fishing, they call back and say how many pounds of fish they caught and when they will be back. That creates a real-time market with buyers."
