= Mitra personal mover =

Personal transporter designed in India

- Type: Mobility device
- Inventor: Rishabh Sinha and Subhav Sinha

The Mitra personal mover is an Indian battery-operated mobility device. The vehicle is capable of carrying a single person and aimed to be useful particularly in airport corridors, institutional campuses and in speciality buildings such as hospitals where low noise pollution is required. The vehicle is twin motor based and works on unique hybrid steering mechanism developed by inventors Rishabh Sinha and Subhav Sinha.

== History ==
Subhav Sinha, one of inventors, was selected as the 'International Climate Champion' for year 2010, a program run by British Council. The creation has been covered by CII (Confederation of Indian Industries) in Journal of Small Business and Enterprise as "Mitra shows path of Innovation". The Economic Times has featured their exhibition at The Auto Expo with the article 'Personalised mover' draws eyes at Auto Expo' Entrepreneur India magazine has also featured the Mitra in its start-up section in the article 'Mobility Gets Personal'. Techpedia, a portal of technology projects by students, an initiative of SRISTI (Society for Research and Initiatives for Sustainable Technologies and Institutions) has featured this vehicle in a list of its top-ranking projects. The vehicle has been covered by leading daily locals like The Hindu, and Deccan Chronicle.

Mitra was used at the Commonwealth Games 2010 held at New Delhi. It was also featured in the CII- I3 National Fair Exhibition, organised jointly by CII, Agilent Technologies and DST (Department of Science and Technology). Mitra was displayed at the 10th Auto Expo held at Pragati Maidan in New Delhi, India.

== Design ==
Rishabh Sinha and Subhav are the Mitra's developers. The vehicle is self balanced and has both standing and sit provision for a single person. Its unique alignment of wheels gives the vehicle additional stability by controlling the centre of gravity, and prevents the person from falling while accelerating, braking or during sharp turns. Being battery operated, this vehicle is eco-friendly as it does not emit any effluents and consumes less energy compared to existing petrol and diesel vehicles.
