= Molekule =

Science and technology company

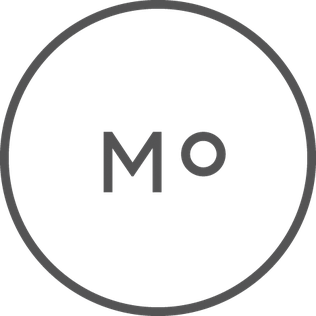
- Formerly: Transformair, Aeroclean
- Type: Private
- Industry: Manufacturing
- Founded: 2014
- Founder: Jaya Rao, Dilip Goswami
- Headquarters: Palm Beach Gardens, United States
- Key people: Jason DiBona, CEO
- Products: Molekule Air Pro, Molekule Air Mini+
- Website: molekule.com

Molekule is a science and technology company headquartered in San Francisco. It designs and manufactures air purifiers that use photoelectrochemical oxidation (PECO), a technology that the company claims may be useful against chemicals, microbes, allergens, and other forms of air pollution. The devices were found to be ineffective by The Wirecutter in independent product tests, and Consumer Reports ranked Molekule as the third lowest in a 2019 test of 48 air purifiers. The Better Business Bureau asked Molekule to stop a range of claims the company made about the effectiveness of its devices. The company's research and development takes place at the University of South Florida campus and started shipping to Canada, India and South Korea in 2020.

== History ==
During the 1990s, Dharendra Yogi Goswami started developing photo-voltaic technology to break down air pollutants in his home due to his son's severe asthma. Goswami created air filtration prototypes that used photoelectrochemical oxidation (PECO) and nanotechnology to eliminate indoor pollutants on a molecular level. The technology was patented in 2014 by Goswami's children, Jaya and Dilip, and founded under the name Transformair. By 2016, the company was known as Molekule.

Molekule's first product, Molekule Air, started shipping in early 2017. The company completed a Series A funding in July 2017, raising $10.1 million. In late 2018, Molekule announced $25 million in funding led by the Foundry Group. The company announced in May 2019 that it would open a U.S.-based manufacturing plant in Polk County, Florida, which was the first in the Tampa Bay Area. The company released the Molekule Air Mini, a miniature version of its Molekule Air purifier, in October 2019. The Air Mini purifier, along with the Air Mini+, received FDA approval for use in hospitals or home health in April 2021.

It raised $58 million in Series C funding by early 2020, later releasing an Air Mini+ purifier. During the early months of the COVID-19 pandemic, the company's chief scientist claimed that "[Molekule's] technology will destroy coronavirus", which was criticized by Vox as a method of profiting off the pandemic.

In September 2021, Kevin Love was announced as an investor in the company. Molekule expanded its product line into Europe that November. The company added a feature known as the Molekule Air Score that displays levels of particles and chemicals in the surrounding air in 2022. In 2022, the company launched the Tri Power filter, which both uses PECO technology and meets HEPA filtration standards.

On October 3, 2023, Molekule filed for Chapter 11 bankruptcy. The company stated it will continue to operate its business as normal during the bankruptcy process. The company successfully completed the Chapter 11 bankruptcy process in February of 2024, and is continuing normal operations.

== FDA regulation, marketing claims and reception ==
In 2016, Popular Science recognized Molekule as one of its "10 Greatest Home Innovations Of The Year". In 2017, the company was a finalist at the SXSW 2017 Interactive Innovation Awards for Health, Med, & Biotech, also receiving the Silver Edison Award for Environmental Quality later that year. It was listed as one of the TIME "25 Best Inventions of 2017" and was an honorable mention at Fast Company’s 2018 Innovation By Design Awards.

The Molekule Air was criticized as ineffective by Wirecutter and Consumer Reports. Wirecutter also tested the Molekule Air Mini, and described the two as "the worst air purifiers we’ve ever tested", noting that "at a certain point, these results look worse than what you see with no purifier running at all."

In October 2019, the Better Business Bureau's National Advertising Division (NAD) recommended that Molekule stop 26 advertising claims about the effectiveness of its devices after a complaint by its competitor, Dyson. Molekule complied with some of the recommendations (e.g. removing references to "independent testing") but appealed others, arguing that the NAD had not taken into account some newer test results. In June 2020, the BBB's National Advertising Review Board rejected Molekule's appeal almost entirely, with Molekule agreeing to remove various additional claims, including its longstanding slogan "Finally, an air purifier that actually works", and to modify others to clarify that they refer to the PECO technology rather than its actual products.

In August 2019, Molekule reached a $149,000 settlement with the California Air Resources Board (CARB) for selling indoor air-cleaning devices in California that had not received the certification required under the state's Regulation for Limiting Ozone Emissions from Indoor Air Cleaning Devices. As part of the settlement, Molekule ceased selling the air cleaner in California until the device was certified by CARB as producing an ozone emission concentration not exceeding 0.050 parts per million.

In April 2020, Molekule received 510(k) clearance from the FDA for a new product, the Molekule Air Pro RX, as a Class II medical device. The Air Pro was cleared for medical use in the destruction of viruses, bacteria and mold the next year.
