= Dhiraj Choudhury =

Indian painter (1936 – 2018)

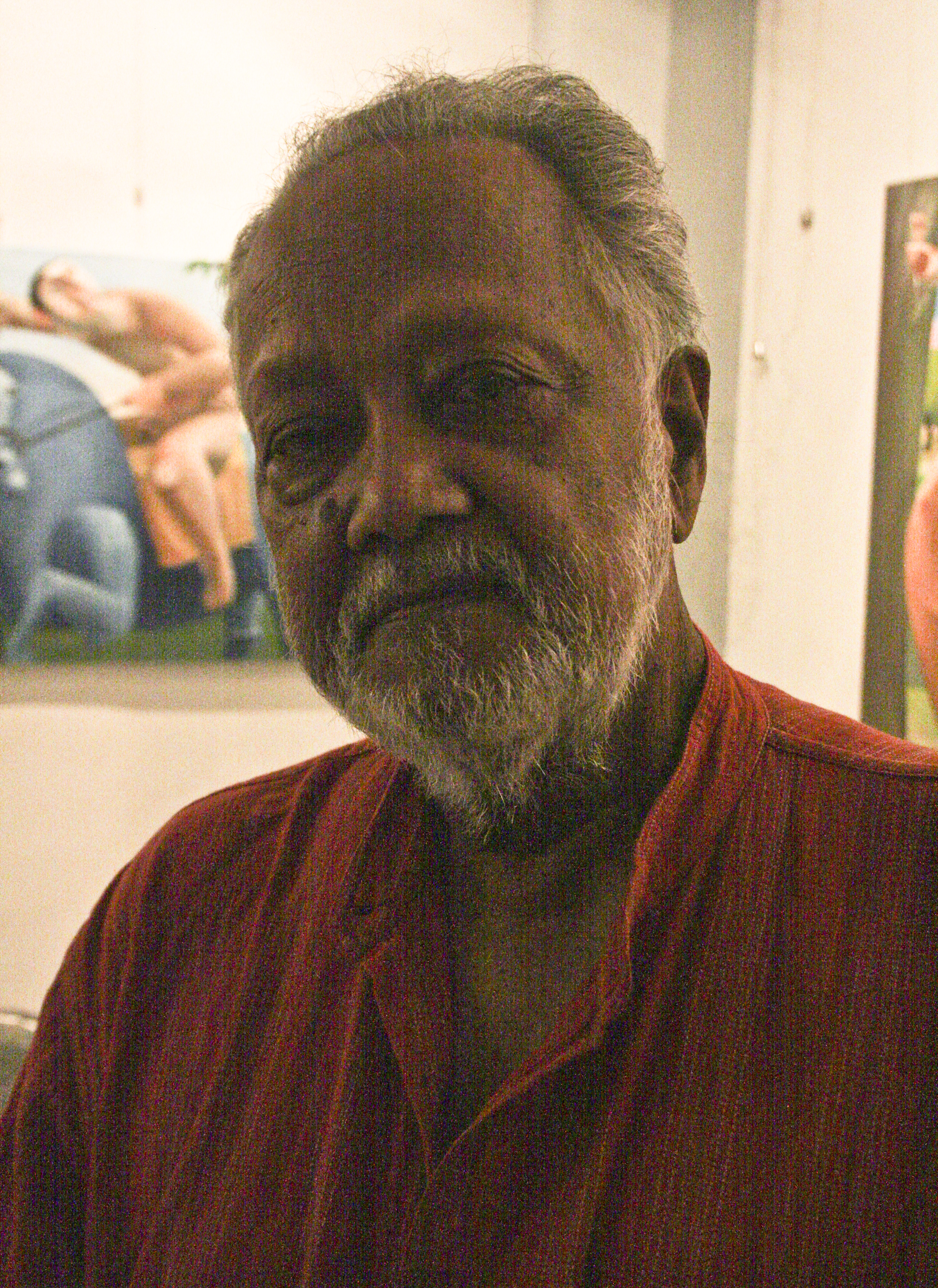
- Born: Dhiraj Chowdhury; September 1936; Brahmanbaria District, British India
- Died: 1 June 2018 (aged 81); Kolkata, West Bengal, India
- Known for: Painting drawing
- Spouse: Leena Chowdhury

Dhiraj Choudhury (September 1936 – 1 June 2018) was an Indian painter. His work was displayed in more than eighty exhibitions, among those sixteen were international painting exhibitions.

== Career ==
Choudhury was born in 1936 in Bengal and took up painting as a budding artist from his childhood. Choudhury taught at the College of Art, New Delhi, during 1961–66. Choudhury referred to himself as an "aggressive painter" of "life full of misery" having to live through partition. He often expressed his protests against the dowry system, corruption and social inequalities.

== Death ==
Choudhury died on 1 June 2018, at the age of 82.
