= Vertex Holdings =

A subsidiary of Temasek holding

- Type: Subsidiary
- Industry: Venture capital
- Founded: 1988; 38 years ago
- Headquarters: Singapore
- Area served: South East Asia, China, India, Israel, United States of America
- Services: IT, Healthcare
- Total assets: $6 billion (2024)
- Parent: Temasek
- Website: vertexholdings.com

Vertex Venture Holdings, also known as Vertex Holdings, is an investment holding company based in Singapore with a group of venture capital funds worldwide. A subsidiary of Temasek Holdings, the company focuses on venture capital investment opportunities in the information technology and healthcare markets through its global family of six direct investment venture funds.

Vertex provides anchor funding and operational support to these funds. Each fund has its own General Partners and investment teams, focusing on different regional markets.

== History ==
Incorporated in 1988, Vertex Holdings started as a corporate venture capital under Singapore Technologies.

The company became a full subsidiary of Temasek Holdings in 2004, after the dot-com bubble.

In 2008, a new CEO, Chua Kee Lock, was brought in to manage the company.

In 2015, the company was rebranded to Vertex Holdings. It was transformed to an investment holding company, with direct investments made by a network of six venture capital funds around the world.

The Vertex Growth fund was the sixth fund added in 2019 to focus on growth-stage opportunities from the other five early-stage Vertex Ventures funds.

In 2019, Vertex Holdings also raised money from foreign investors for its master fund for the first time, receiving $180 million from Japanese investors.

In May 2024, Vertex Holdings launched its first Japan-focused fund.

Some well known investments made by Vertex funds include CyberArk, Grab, Mobike and Waze.
