= Delhi Technological University =

State Government run technical university in Delhi, India

Delhi Technological University (DTU)
- Dillī Praudyogikī Viśvavidyālaya
- Seal of the Delhi Technological University (DTU)
- Former names: Delhi College of Engineering; Delhi Polytechnic
- Motto: Vijñānavān prajñānavān bhavatu
- Motto in English: Let the wise be knowledgeable
- Type: Public (state university)
- Established: 1941; 85 years ago
- Chancellor: Lieutenant Governor of Delhi
- Vice-Chancellor: Prateek Sharma
- Students: 15,045 (2018–2019)
- Undergraduates: 7,170 (2018–2019)
- Postgraduates: 898 (2018–2019)
- Doctoral students: 395 (2018–2019)
- Location: Bawana Road, Shahbad Daulatpur Village, Rohini, Delhi, 110042, India; 28°44′59.81″N 77°7′1.30″E
- Campus: Main Campus 68 hectares (167 acres), East Delhi campus 0.83 hectares (2.06 acres); Urban
- Language: Hindi; English
- Website: www.dtu.ac.in
- Location within Delhi

The Delhi Technological University (DTU), formerly known as Delhi College of Engineering (DCE) is a state university in Rohini, Delhi, India. It was established in 1941 as Delhi Polytechnic. In 1952, it began giving degrees after affiliating with the Faculty of Technology, University of Delhi. The institute has been under the Government of Delhi since 1963 and was affiliated with the Faculty of Technology, University of Delhi from 1952 to 2009. In 2009, the college was given university status, changing its name to Delhi Technological University.

== History ==
=== Delhi Polytechnic ===
The Delhi Polytechnic was envisioned as a follow-up of the Wood and Abbott Committee of 1938. It was established as Delhi Polytechnic in 1941. The technical school was created to cater to the demands of Indian industries. At that time, Delhi Polytechnic offered courses in Arts, Architecture, Commerce, Engineering, Applied Science and Textiles. Walter William Wood, became the founder and Principal of Delhi Polytechnic. It became Delhi's first engineering college and was amongst the few engineering institutions in India set up before independence.

The college was affiliated with the Faculty of Technology, University of Delhi in 1952 and started formal degree-level programmes.

=== Delhi College of Engineering ===
Until 1962, the college was under the direct control of the Ministry of Education, Government of India. In 1963, Delhi Polytechnic was taken over by the then Delhi Administration and Chief Commissioner Delhi was the ex-officio chairman of the college. It later became a college of the Union Territory of Delhi. In 1963, the Department of Arts became the College of Arts and the Department of Commerce & Business Administration was converted to several institutes of Commerce & Secretarial Practices. The fragmentation of Delhi Polytechnic ultimately left behind an engineering institute alone. In 1962, the college was affiliated with Faculty of Technology, University of Delhi. In 1965, the Delhi Polytechnic was renamed Delhi College of Engineering and became the first engineering college of Delhi, Now it is called Delhi Technological University.

B.E. degree course in Production & Industrial Engineering was started in 1988 while the B.E. degree course in Computer Engineering was started in 1989. B.E. degree-level courses were started in Polymer Science & Chemical Technology and Environment Engineering in 1998. Information technology played a vital role during this era and the beginning of the new millennium witnessed the introduction of a B.E. in Information Technology in 2002. B.E. in Bio-Technology was introduced from the academic session 2004–2005.

The Department of Architecture of the Delhi College of Engineering became the School of Planning and Architecture, now a Deemed University and Institution of National importance. The Department of Arts and Sculpture became the College of Arts and the Departments of Chemical Technology and Textile Technology were shifted out en bloc to mark the beginning of the IIT Delhi at its new campus at Hauz Khas. The Department of Commerce was later abolished and the Faculty of Management Studies of the University of Delhi was established by Prof. A. Das Gupta, of DCE. Delhi Administration established the Delhi Institute of Technology (presently known as Netaji Subhas University of Technology) in 1985 and the new college was established under the patronage of the Delhi College of Engineering. DCE shared its campus with DIT at Kashmiri Gate campus, although later, DIT was shifted to Dwarka as a follow-up of the Wood and Abott Committee of 1938. Delhi College of Engineering is thus the father institution of several national institutes including Indian Institute of Technology Delhi, Netaji Subhas Institute of Technology, School of Planning and Architecture, Delhi, College of Art, Delhi and Faculty of Management Studies.

=== DCE-DTU Reconstitution and related protests in 2009–10 ===
In July 2009, Delhi College of Engineering was upgraded to a state university from being a college affiliated to Faculty of Technology, University of Delhi and renamed Delhi Technological University (DTU), through the Delhi Technological University Bill, 2009. P. B. Sharma was nominated as the university's first Vice-Chancellor. The move was met with student protests over the erosion of the DCE brand (due to being downgraded from being part of a central university to a state university) and the reduction in the supposed value of their degree. which culminated to a face-off in March 2010, with the students boycotting the mid-semester exams, and demanding reconsideration of the change and replacement of the VC. The Chief Minister of Delhi, Sheila Dikshit said that the change will not be reconsidered, and by the end of March the protest dwindled down, with the students taking their exams. In April 2010 Times City reported that the government would be willing to change the name to "DCE Technological University" (DCE TU). The university name remained unchanged as of September 2024.

The DTU campus has a lake.

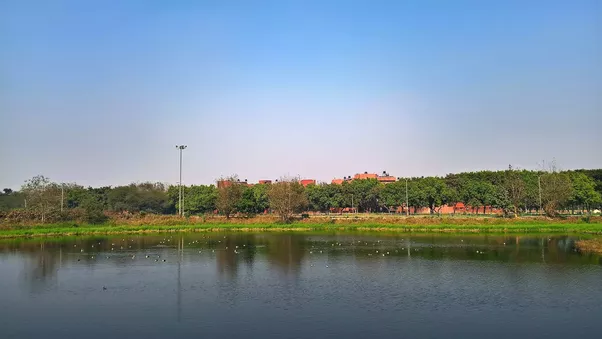
DTU Lake, with HJB hostel cluster in backdrop.

== Campuses ==
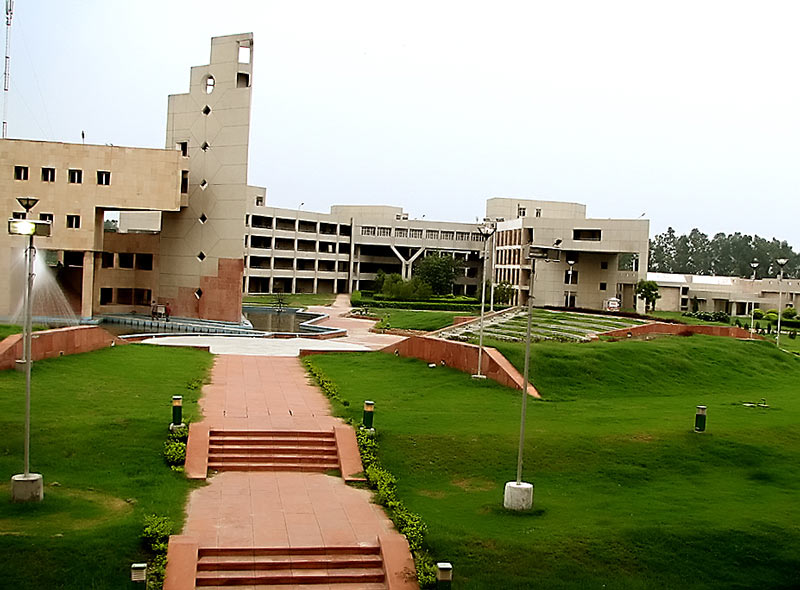
Computer Center, Placement Block and Science Block

Delhi Technological University (Delhi College of Engineering) operated from the Kashmiri Gate campus in the heart of Old Delhi until 1989, when construction began at the New Campus at Bawana Road in May. Moving operations from Kashmiri Gate to the new 164 acres at Bawana Road began in 1995, and the new campus formally started classes for all four years of study starting in 1999.

In 2010, the DTU created a plan to make the campus environmentally friendly which included barring entry of vehicles on campus, generation of one-third of the energy from alternative sources and designing new buildings as per the "green architecture concept".

DTU can accommodate 1,105 girls and 1,600 boys. Two new hostels were inaugurated in July 2022.

== Academics ==
=== Academic programmes ===
DTU offers courses towards Bachelor of Technology (B.Tech.), Bachelor of Technology (B.Tech. Evening), Bachelor of Arts (Hons.), Bachelor of Design (B.Des), Integrated B.Sc.-M.Sc. (I.M.Sc.), Master of Technology (MTech), Master of Science (M.Sc.), Doctor of Philosophy (PhD), Master of Business Administration (M.B.A.) and Bachelor of Business Administration (B.B.A.).

=== Rankings ===
University rankings

General – international
- QS (Asia) (2024): 701-750
- Times (World) (2024): 801-1000
- Times (Asia) (2024): 201-250
- Times (Emerging) (2022): 191

General – India
- NIRF (Overall) (2024): 66
- NIRF (Universities) (2024): 48

Engineering – India
- NIRF (2024): 27
- India Today (2024): 9

In India, the National Institutional Ranking Framework (NIRF) ranked it 30th in engineering, 42nd among universities and 62nd overall in 2024.

Internationally, Delhi Technological University was ranked 601-800 in the world by the Times Higher Education World University Rankings. It was also ranked 159 in Asia and 191 among Emerging Economies University Rankings in 2022.

Among engineering colleges, Delhi Technological University was ranked 1st by Times Engineering Rankings 2020, 9th by Outlook India in 2022. It was ranked 9th among colleges by India Today in 2022.

== Research ==
Students at DTU participate in projects such as design and development of a Formula SAE car, Unmanned Ground Vehicle (UGV DTU), SAE Mini Baja, ASME HPV, Hybrid Car, solar car, unmanned aerial vehicles, innovative embedded devices appreciated worldwide and setting up a plant for manufacturing Biodiesel.

The Defianz Racing team participating in the Formula Student competition, is one of the student teams collaborating with universities from other countries and actively participate in international and national competitions. The college also came up with the development of a Personalised Mover – Mitra. Delhi College of Engineering is one of the TIFAC COREs (Technology Information, Forecasting & Assessment Council's Centres Of Relevance & Excellence) in Fiber Optics and Optical Communication. Also, Students of Delhi College of Engineering have made it top-15 Worldwide slots in the Microsoft Imagine Cup 2007 and 2008.

The technical team UAS-DTU has been successful in designing and building a prototype UAV, the Aarush X-1 with funding and mentorship from Lockheed Martin, USA. It also stood third in the AUVSI Student Unmanned Air System (SUAS) Competition, 2012. The team has developed several prototype UAVs and expands its UAV count each year.

The solar car team, DTU Solaris was the first solar electric vehicle team in the country to have developed a two-seater passenger solar electric vehicle Arka in 2012. Its previous design – Avenir won the Most Economical Car Award in WSC 2011.

The campus at DTU has been proposed as one of the sites for the Delhi Government's plan of creating Delhi a Research and IT hub. A Knowledge Park at DTU has been set up as part of better infrastructure for Delhi.

DTU had been selected by Intel Technology Pvt. Ltd. to join Planet Lab Consortium which has the world's top universities and industrial research labs like Princeton University, University of Washington and NEC Labs as its members.

The largest waste-to-energy plant in any educational institution in North India is operational in DTU. The university is now building a sewage treatment plant on its 164-acre campus in Rohini, Delhi.

Team DTU Super mileage took part in the Shell Eco-marathon, part of the inaugural Make the Future India festival in Chennai, held at the Madras Motor Race Track. In the Urban Concept internal combustion engine category, they clocked 154kpl in their vehicle. A total of 20 teams participated in the event, under two categories: Prototype (futuristic vehicles with incredible aerodynamics) and Urban Concept (conventional, roadworthy, energy-efficient vehicles aimed at meeting the real-life needs of drivers).

UAS-DTU won the first spot for the ‘Flying Formation Challenge’ at the Drone Olympics the biennial Aero India Show 2019. UAS-DTU also received prize money of Rs. 5 lakh including a developmental kit from Lockheed Martin and would further be trained for the AlphaPilot, an open innovation challenge in the US. They also exhibited a stall under the R&D Department of the Indian Air Force (IAF).

== Controversies ==
=== 2019–20 Online End-Term Examination Protests ===
DTU saw online protests in June–July 2020 amid the decision of the administration to conduct AI-proctored online end-term examinations amidst the COVID-19 pandemic. The protests saw #cancelDTUexams trend on Twitter for over 2 weeks with articles in media outlets such as Education Times, Navbharat Times, Hindustan Times, India TV, and Careers 360. Students also came out with online petitions to voice their concerns.

Students have cited that conducting exams of intermediate semesters is a clear violation of UGC guidelines. Other reasons cited by students are lack of resources, incomplete syllabus after lockdown, internships & skill development courses, mental stress (many have not even stepped out of their house for months now due to COVID-19), online exams not being conducted by top engineering institutes like IITs, for cancellation of exams. Students also claim that when the university already has the result of past semesters, internal assessment, mid-term examination then why the provisional result should be declared on that basis and those who are not satisfied can appear later. The credibility of online examinations is debatable, students claimed.

As per an article in Navbharat Times, the Vice-Chancellor of DTU Prof Yogesh Singh claimed that if students make up their minds for the exam they will provide them with all resources. This claim was further disputed by the students who said that the university was not providing them with any resources upon being approached and was rather asking them to come to the campus and appear for the exams which are not at all feasible seeing the rising number of COVID-19 cases in the capital.

The Controller of Examination has claimed to the Education Times that the majority of students want to appear in the online examination, a claim which further fuelled the protests as students claimed that it was completely baseless.

The protests finally ended on 11 July 2020 with the press release of the Deputy CM cancelling all exams at the State Universities of Delhi.

On 14 July 2020, more than 3 days after the press release of the Govt of NCT of Delhi, the DTU administration finally released the official notification confirming the cancellation. Even this delay in the official notice led to student outrage on social media for the mentioned period.

=== 2020 Annual Fee Protests ===
The DTU administration released a notice dated 24 July 2020 via the official site on 30 July 2020 demanding hefty annual fees of INR 1,90,000 to be paid just within 5 days. The notice has a punitive clause that after 5 August students will have to bear hefty fines and after 27 August their names may be struck off from the university records.

The move has seen massive student protests with widespread national media coverage. Students sighted that for the last 4 months, they have not utilised any of the college infrastructure and other amenities and the next session being online will not utilise the same due to the ongoing pandemic of COVID-19. DTU is primarily an undergraduate institute with more than 80% of students pursuing UG courses like B.Tech. and the majority of students coming from humble backgrounds, it is almost impossible for them to pay such a hefty fee right now within 5 days of which three are bank holidays, especially due to the adverse effects the pandemic has had on their economic condition. The fee structure of INR 1,90,000 for the B.Tech. course has more than 40% charges on Miscellaneous Heads in the name of facilities and services which the students are not utilising. Hence, the students are being asked to pay for something they have not availed of. The Govt of NCT of Delhi passed an order on 15 April 2020 asking schools govt or private in the capital to only charge tuition fees. Then why is the same not application higher education govt institutes like DTU? The protests saw the #dtufeesrelaxation trend on Twitter for a week.

Anoop Lather, Public Relations Officer of DTU in a statement to The Indian Express on 1 August said that the expenses of the university remain the same as they were before the pandemic and students who have problems paying can submit an application which shall be considered on the case-to-case basis. The statement further received backlash from the students who said that the university administration was not responding to any of their emails and letters for concession and payment in instalments and further it would be insane to suggest that the expenses of the university functioning via free online platforms like Google Meet could remain the same as before. Students also claimed that many other government institutes like IIT Kharagpur and NIT Patna had already given concessions to students on miscellaneous heads, and none were demanding one-time annual fee payments.

After getting no positive response from the Govt of NCT of Delhi and the university administration by the fee payment deadline of 5 August, the students wrote an open letter to LG of Delhi Anil Baijal who is also the Chancellor of the University on 6 August 2020 asking him to take action against the Vice-Chancellor of DTU Prof Yogesh Singh for displaying yet again an apathetic attitude towards the concerns of students and their families who are already under severe economic and mental stress amid the pandemic. They also alleged that the university administration intimidated some Class Representatives via the Office of the Vice-Chancellor to either pay the fee or face disciplinary action. NSUI also wrote to the LG asking him to take back the annual fee notice. On 7 August, some students organised a protest march in the DTU campus. Protesters claimed that no one from the DTU administration met them on the given day. TOI claimed that the university did not respond to any of its calls on the same day.

Students also claimed that the university was using the Training and Placement Department to intimidate them by asking them to pay their fees immediately, or else they would not be allowed to sit for placements for the year 2020–2021

On 8 August, some students met BJP Delhi president Adesh Kumar Gupta who then wrote to the CM Arvind Kejriwal asking him to intervene in the maturation at the request of the students.

As of 8 August, more than 50% of the students have not paid the annual fee as per the PRO of DTU. Until 9 August, the DTU admin has refused to budge any concessions and relaxations to the student.

As of now, the office of LG has forwarded the matter to the Directorate of Training and Technical Education for further action as per the complaint filed by DTU students.

== Notable alumni ==
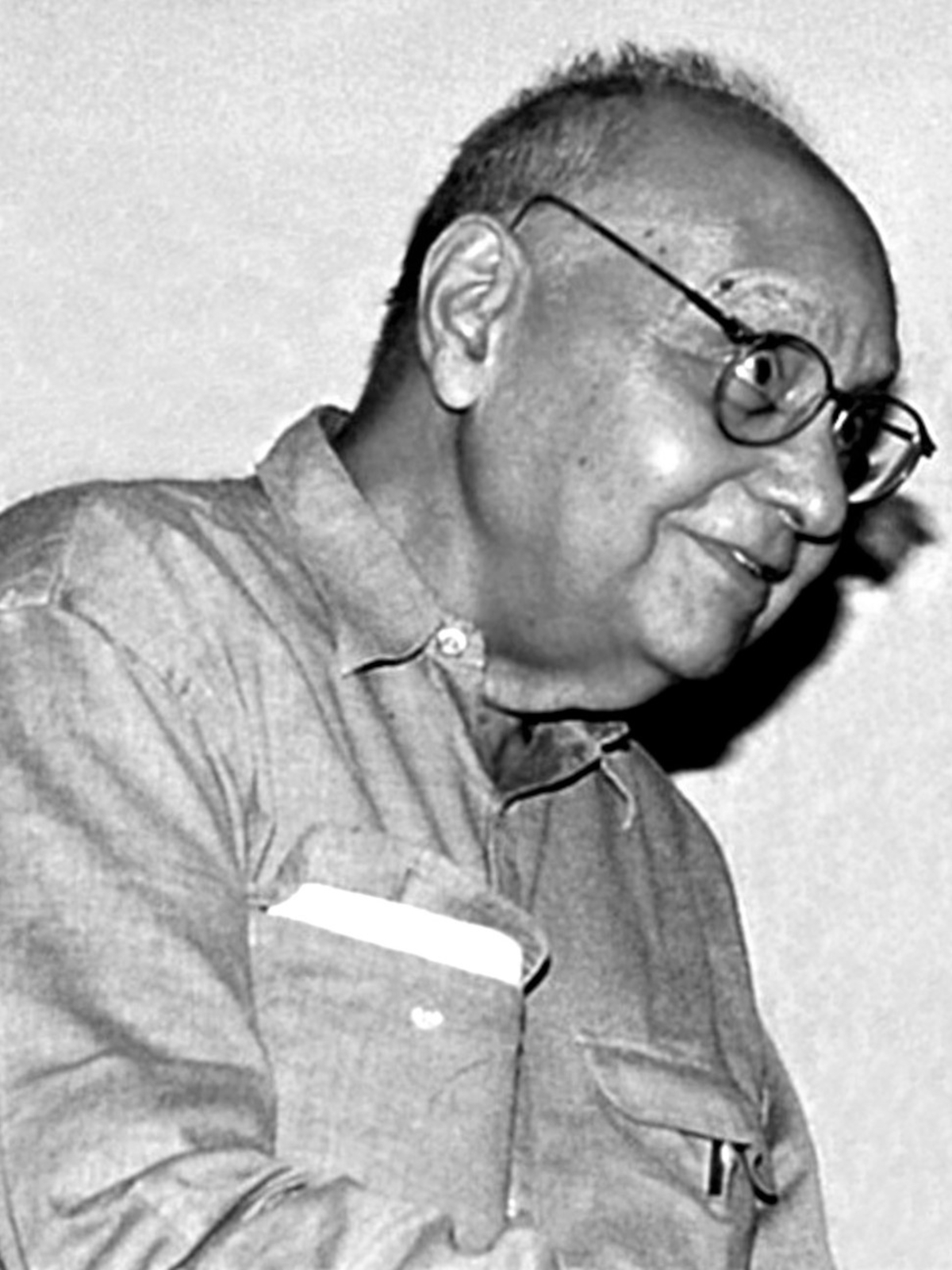
Aditya Prakash, architect

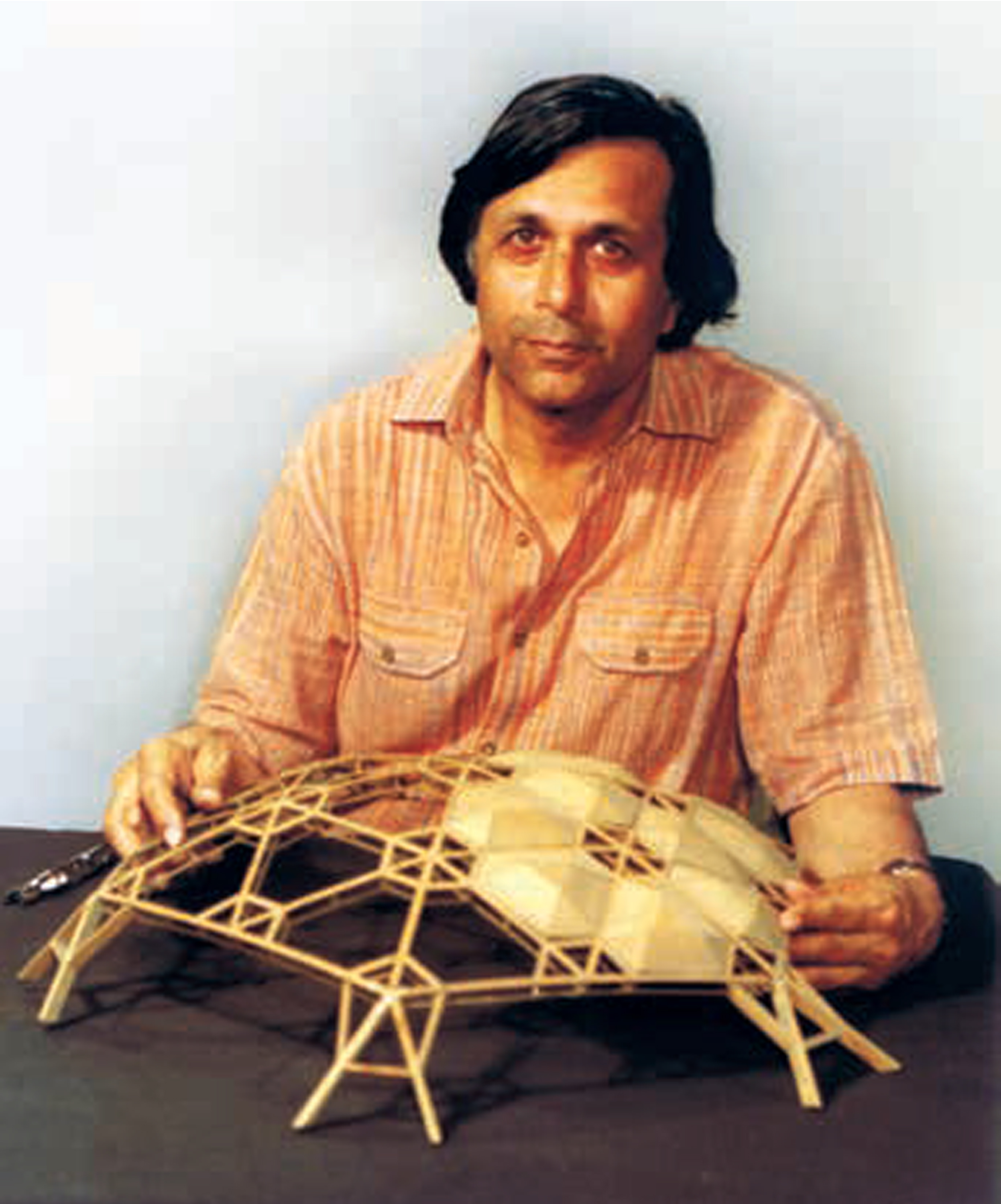
Raj Rewal, architect

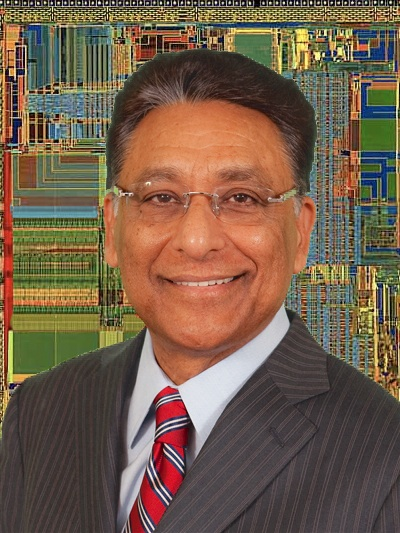
Vinod Dham, inventor of the pentium processor

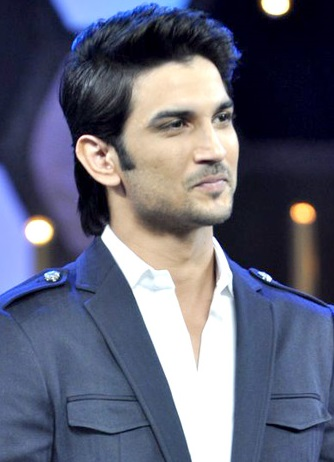
Sushant Singh Rajput, actor

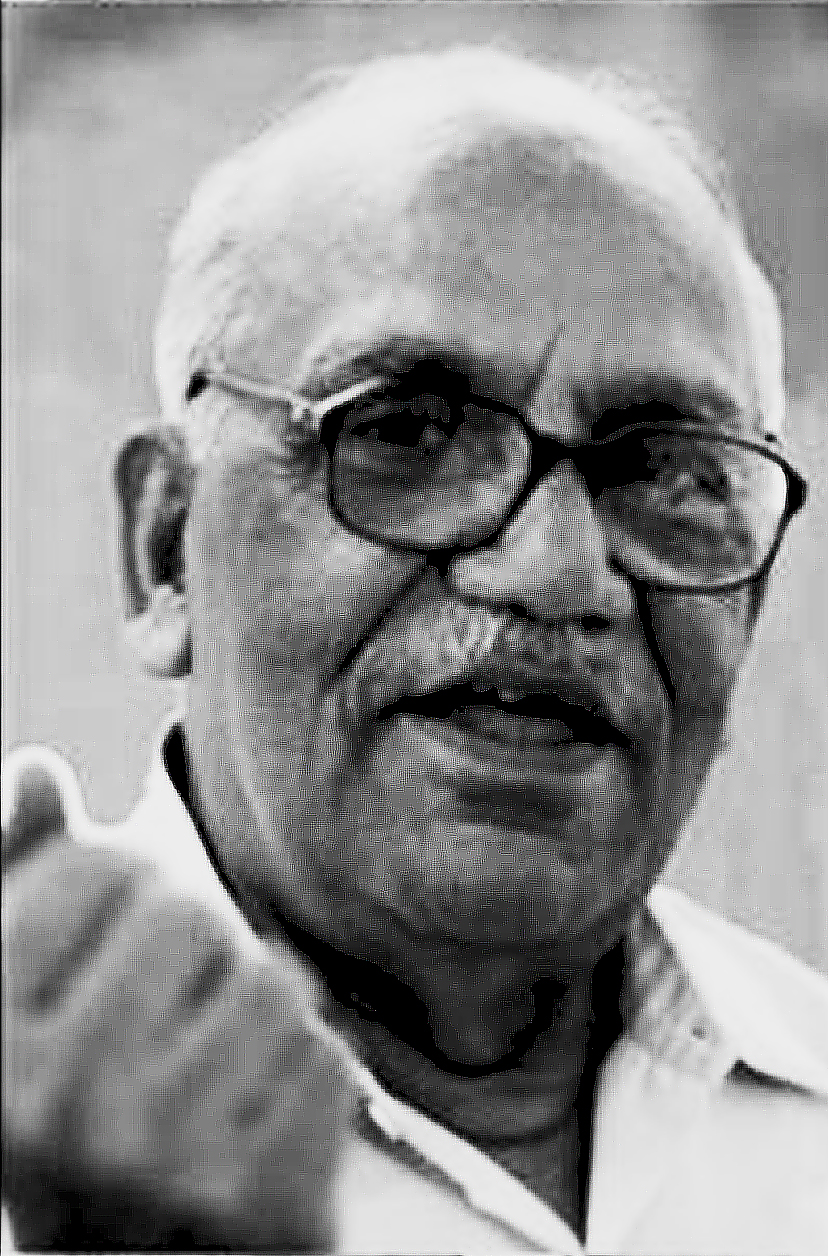
Jagmohan Chopra, photographer

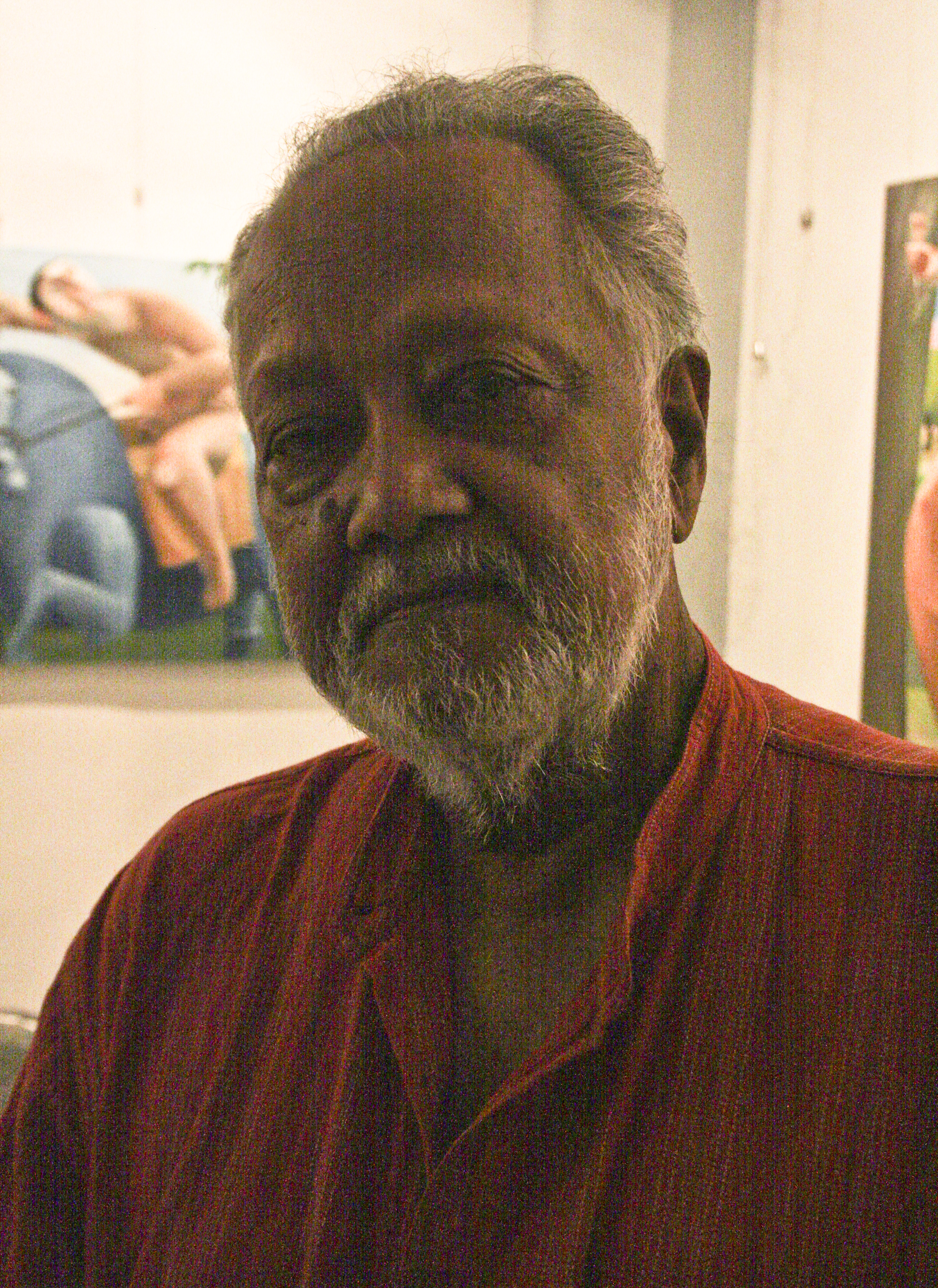
Dhiraj Choudhury, painter

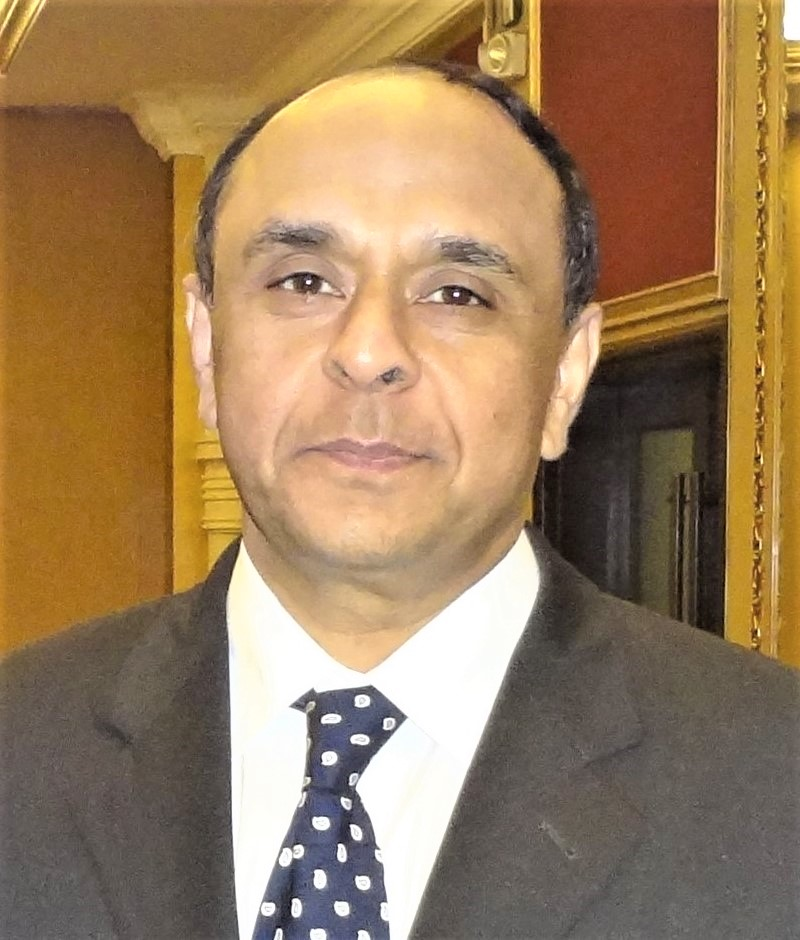
Arvind Saxena, former chairman, UPSC

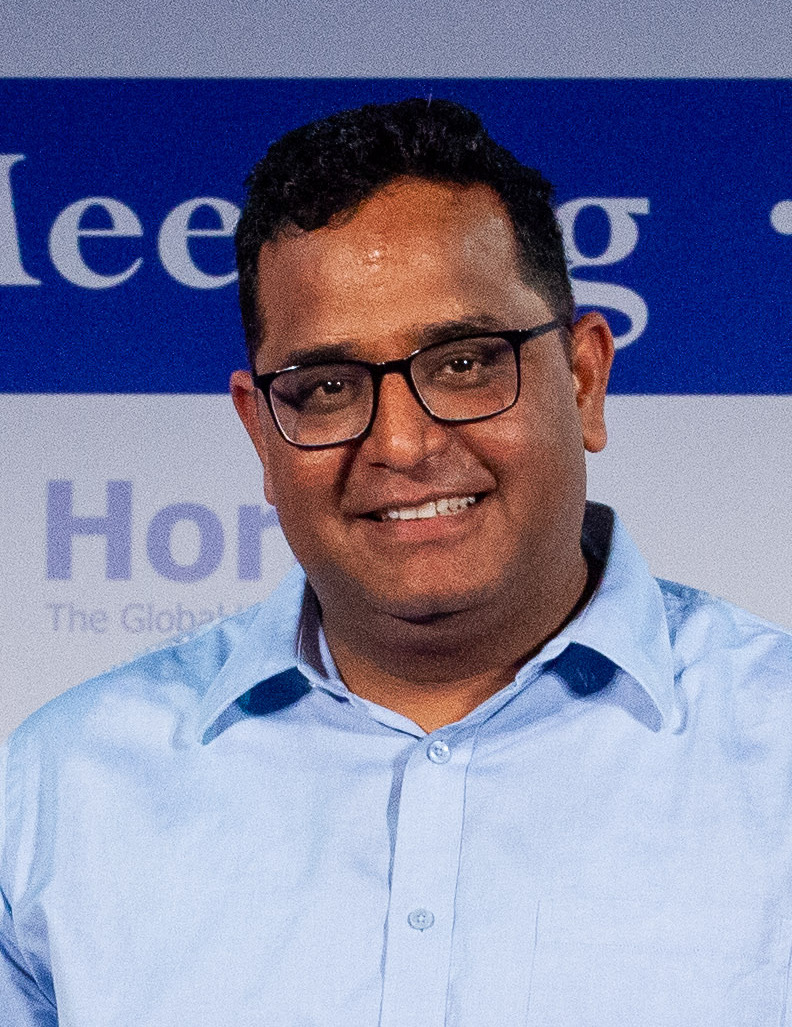
Vijay Shekhar Sharma, Founder & CEO, Paytm
