= Journey's End (painting) =

Painting by Abanindranath Tagore

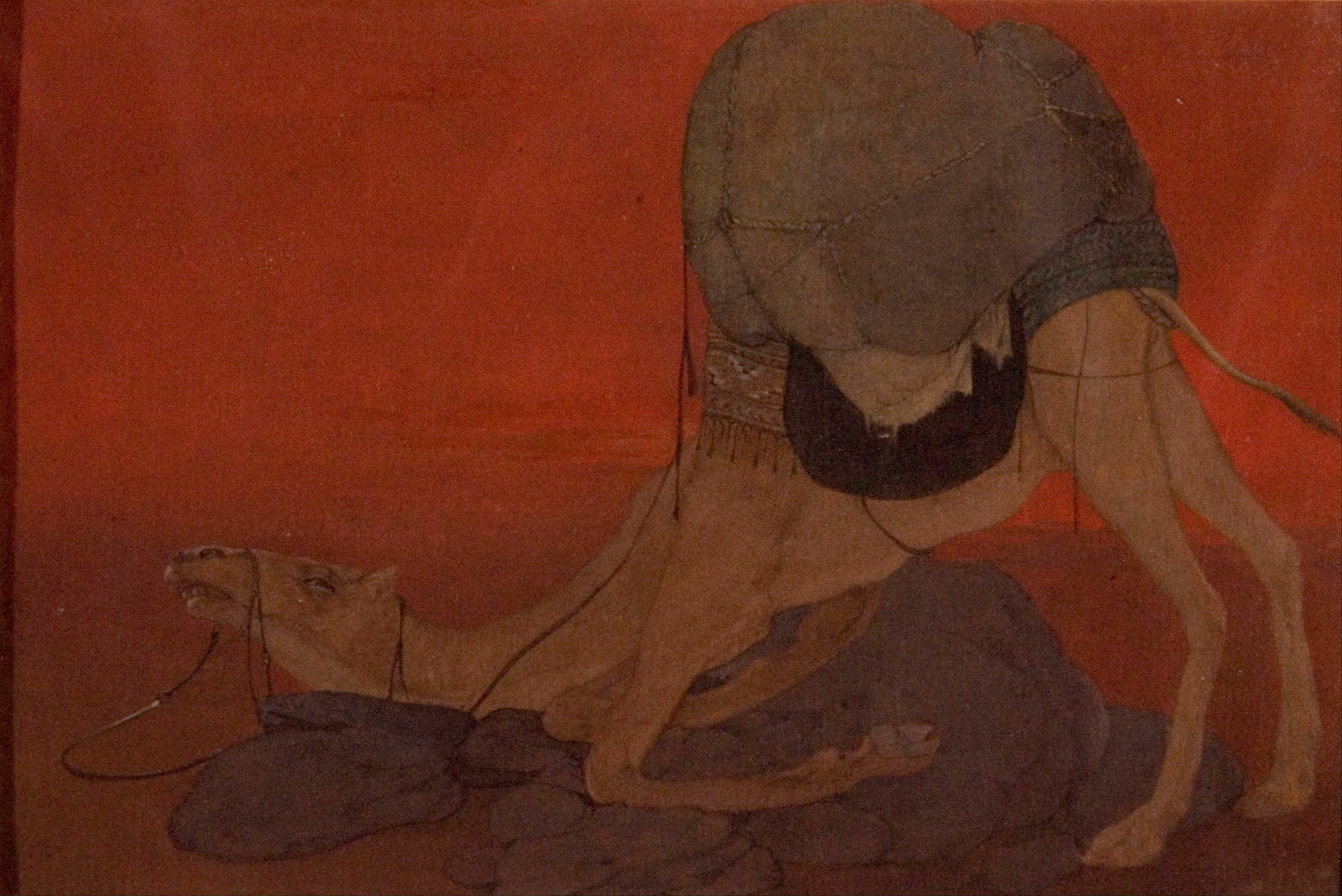
- Artist: Abanindranath Tagore
- Year: c. 1913
- Medium: Tempera on paper
- Location: National Gallery of Modern Art, New Delhi

Journey's End is a tempera on paper painting, painted by Indian artist Abanindranath Tagore (1871–1951) in 1913.

== Background ==
Towards the close of the 19th century, Abanindranath Tagore, encouraged by E.B. Havell, an English arts administrator, questioned the British academic system of art education. Dissatisfied with the physicality of the oil medium, he held the belief that Western art was "materialistic" in nature. Tagore, in the process, founded the Bengal School of Art, an art movement that originated primarily in Kolkata and Shantiniketan, but flourished throughout the Indian subcontinent, eventually associating itself with Indian nationalism (swadeshi). The Bengal School is widely considered to have helped pave the way for modern art in India. This way, Tagore led the Indian artistic renaissance. He believed in rejecting European art and returning to traditional Indian art by reviving India's identity in the arts scene. He also developed an interest in Mughal miniature traditions and was greatly influenced by the Japanese wash technique.

== The painting ==
The painting depicts a worn-out camel which has collapsed under the weight of its heavy load, presumably after a long and exhausting journey. The backdrop of the painting shows a sunset in a hot desert, as is evident by the saturated use of red, orange, brown, and yellow. The camel's eyes are half shut, and there is no sign of respite. The camel's forelegs are bent at its knees, and its posterior legs stand upright; its head is pointing upwards, indicative of a desire to take another chance to get up. Tagore has used precise yet delicate and non-mechanical lines. The application of wash technique is visible. The colour palette used in the painting comprises few shades: red, orange, brown, and yellow in the background, and a tint of blue. The overall appearance of the painting is calm and misty.

== Interpretations ==
Apart from the general understanding of the painting, certain interpretations link it to the Indian freedom movement. Art critics have interpreted the painting as being representative of India under British colonial rule. The use of a camel as the subject has been appreciated, since a camel symbolises endurance, patience, and adaptability. The painting appears to compare the camel's virtues to those of Indians and its heavy burden to the British Raj's oppressive and exploitative rule.
