= Bireswar Sen =

20th-century Indian artist

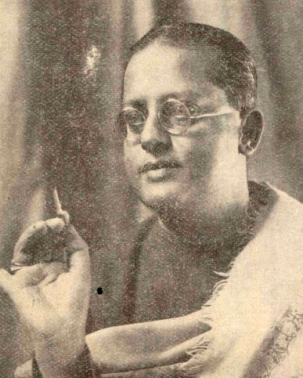
- Born: 15 November 1897; Kolkata (then Calcutta), India
- Died: 10 September 1974; Lucknow Uttar Pradesh India
- Education: Presidency College, Calcutta
- Occupations: Painter, teacher, writer

Bireswar Sen (1897–1974) was an Indian painter, writer, and teacher, who was influenced by the Bengal School of Art and Western modernism, but then later developed a unique visual language of miniatures. He depicted grand landscapes, mostly featuring the Himalayas, on paintings measuring smaller than postcards. Sen was popular and celebrated during his lifetime, but faded from public consciousness after his death.

However, there has been an increasing interest in his oeuvre, since the noted art historian B. N. Goswamy curated an exhibition of his works, titled Heaven and Earth: Himalayas and the Art of Bireswar Sen, at the National Gallery of Modern Art, New Delhi in 2010.

== Early life ==
Sen was born in Kolkata (then Calcutta), British India, to Rai Bahadur Saileswar Sen, a professor of literature at Calcutta University, and Niharnalini Sen. He took up painting and drawing when young, but didn't pursue art formally. He went to Presidency College, Calcutta, where he received an MA in English literature in 1921.

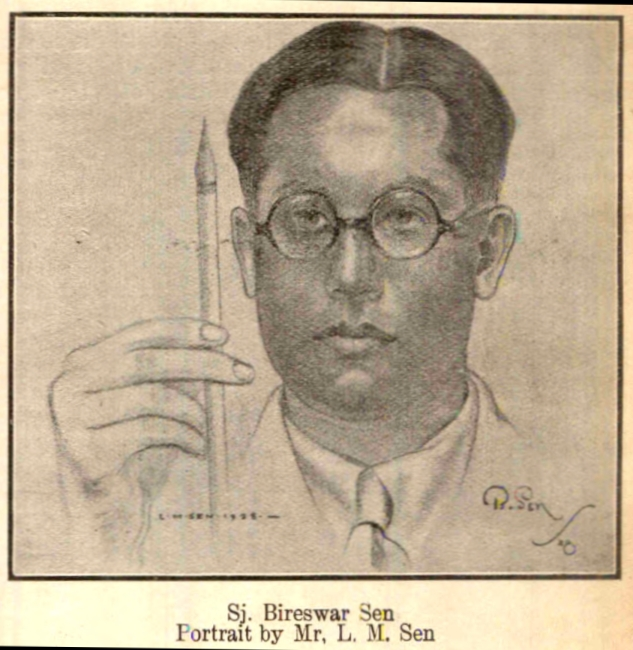
Portrait sketch of Bireswar Sen by L. M. Sen, published in Modern Review (1928)

== Career ==
In 1923, Sen became an English lecturer at Bihar National College in Patna, Bihar. During his teaching, Sen continued to paint and draw and later came into contact with the three Tagores: Abanindranath Tagore, Rabindranath Tagore and Gaganendranath Tagore. He trained informally under modernist Nandalal Bose and Abanindranath, both of whom taught at the Indian Society of Oriental Art.

Sen's miniature watercolours feature mountains, valleys and forlorn landscapes. He was inspired by the Himalayas and visited them continually throughout his life. It was on one of his trips in 1932, when he met the Russian artist Nicholas Roerich, who had settled in the Indian hill town of Naggar in Kullu, Himachal Pradesh. Their meeting, and subsequent correspondence, left a lasting impact on Sen, both artistically and spiritually. Although he was inspired by Roerich, he never imitated Roerich's style, art historian Goswamy claims. "The fountain of his [Sen's] own ideas was different, his understanding of life of another order. Even in sheer physical terms, Bireswar’s work looked very different, small in scale as it was, and painted on paper in the wash technique," wrote Goswamy in an introductory essay.

=== Re-evaluation of Sen's work ===
Sen died in Kolkata on 10 September 1974. After his death, Sen's popularity diminished, and remained so until 2010, when the first posthumous retrospective was held at the National Gallery of Modern Art, New Delhi. In 2016, his works were displayed in a show curated by B.N. Goswamy at the Crow Museum of Asian Art, Dallas, Texas. Then, in November 2017, a second retrospective, Reflections: Man And Nature In The Paintings Of Bireswar Sen, comprising 80 works, was held at the National Gallery of Modern Art in New delhi, which further helped his works reach a wider and new audience.

== Collections ==
Works by Bireswar Sen are represented in several prominent public collections, including:

- State Gallery, Mysore
- Municipal Museum, Prayagraj
- Provincial Museum, Lucknow
- Central Museum, Lahore
