= Kshitindranath Mazumdar =

Indian painter, educator (1891–1975)

- Born: 31 July 1891; Jagtai, Murshidabad, Bengal Presidency, British India (now in West Bengal, India)
- Died: 9 February 1975 (aged 83); Allahabad, India
- Education: Government College of Art & Craft, Kolkata
- Occupations: Painter, educator
- Known for: Painting
- Notable work: Rasa Lila; The Birth of Ganga; The Dance of Shiva; Pururavas
- Movement: Bengal School of Art
- Children: 3
- Awards: Honorary Doctor of Letters (D.Litt.) by Rabindra Bharati University

Kshitindranath Mazumdar (Bengali: ক্ষিতীন্দ্রনাথ মজুমদার; 31 July 1891 – 9 February 1975) was an Indian painter and a key figure of the Bengal School art movement, which paved the way for the development of modern Indian art.

== Early life and education ==
Kshitindranath Mazumdar was born on 31 July 1891 to a Bengali family in Jagtai, a remote village in the Murshidabad district of West Bengal. Mazumdar's mother died during his infancy; his father, Kedarnath Mazumdar, a sub-registrar by profession, raised him by himself.

His family was highly influenced by Vaishnavism, a sect of Hinduism which revolves around the worship of the Hindu deity Vishnu. Artistically inclined since childhood, Mazumdar trained in hymnody and often interpreted legends from Indian epics. As a teenager, he performed in the productions of a local theatre group owned by his father.

Mazumdar's artistic capabilities and talent caught the eye of Mahendra Narayan Roy, the zamindar of a nearby village, Nimtita. On his advice, Mazumdar joined the Government College of Art & Craft in Kolkata. There he met Abanindranath Tagore, one of the founders of the Bengal School of Art.

== Career ==
As a teen, Mazumdar was deeply impacted by Vaishnavism, which was predominant at home. This influence reflected heavily in his paintings, as Mazumdar, now an ardent follower of Krishna, mostly painted on Vaishnavite and literary themes.

With time, he became a disciple of Tagore, and learnt several techniques under his guidance. He developed an interest in Rajput paintings and the frescoes of Ajanta. He was also greatly influenced by the Japanese wash technique. In his paintings, Mazumdar combined elements of Tagore's signature style of supple and delicate lines with segments from Ajanta and Rajput paintings and Far Eastern and Japanese techniques. He incorporated fine lines, subdued hues and simple backgrounds in his paintings. His works include elongated figures, fluid postures and are rhythmic in nature. He was also inspired by Art Nouveau. Mazumdar, in his works, also merged spirituality with sensuality, while focusing on Vaishnavite deities and religious, mythological and Puranic themes and narratives. This reverence for spirituality earned him the title, "saint artist".

Mazumdar, alongside Nandalal Bose, worked as a teacher at the Indian Society of Oriental Art in Kolkata for 18 years from 1912 to 1930. Later in life, he also taught at Santiniketan and served as the Principal of the Art Department at the University of Allahabad, located in Prayagraj, Uttar Pradesh, until his retirement in 1964.

== Awards ==
Mazumdar was presented with a Merit Award by the Bengal Congress Committee. In 1963, he was awarded an honorary Doctor of Letters (D.Litt.) by Rabindra Bharati University, Kolkata.

== Gallery ==
Paintings of Kshitindranath Mazumdar
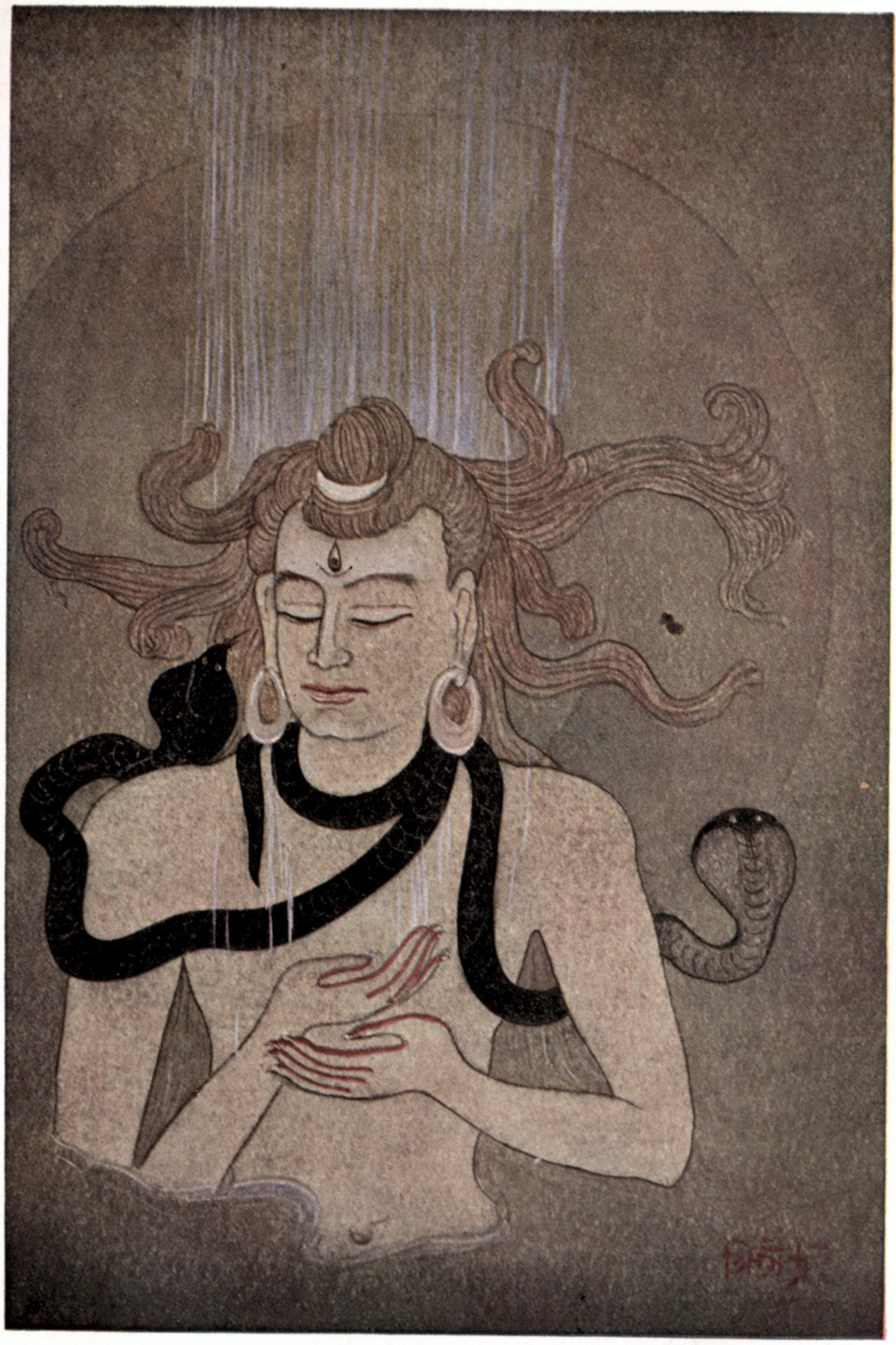
The Birth of Ganga

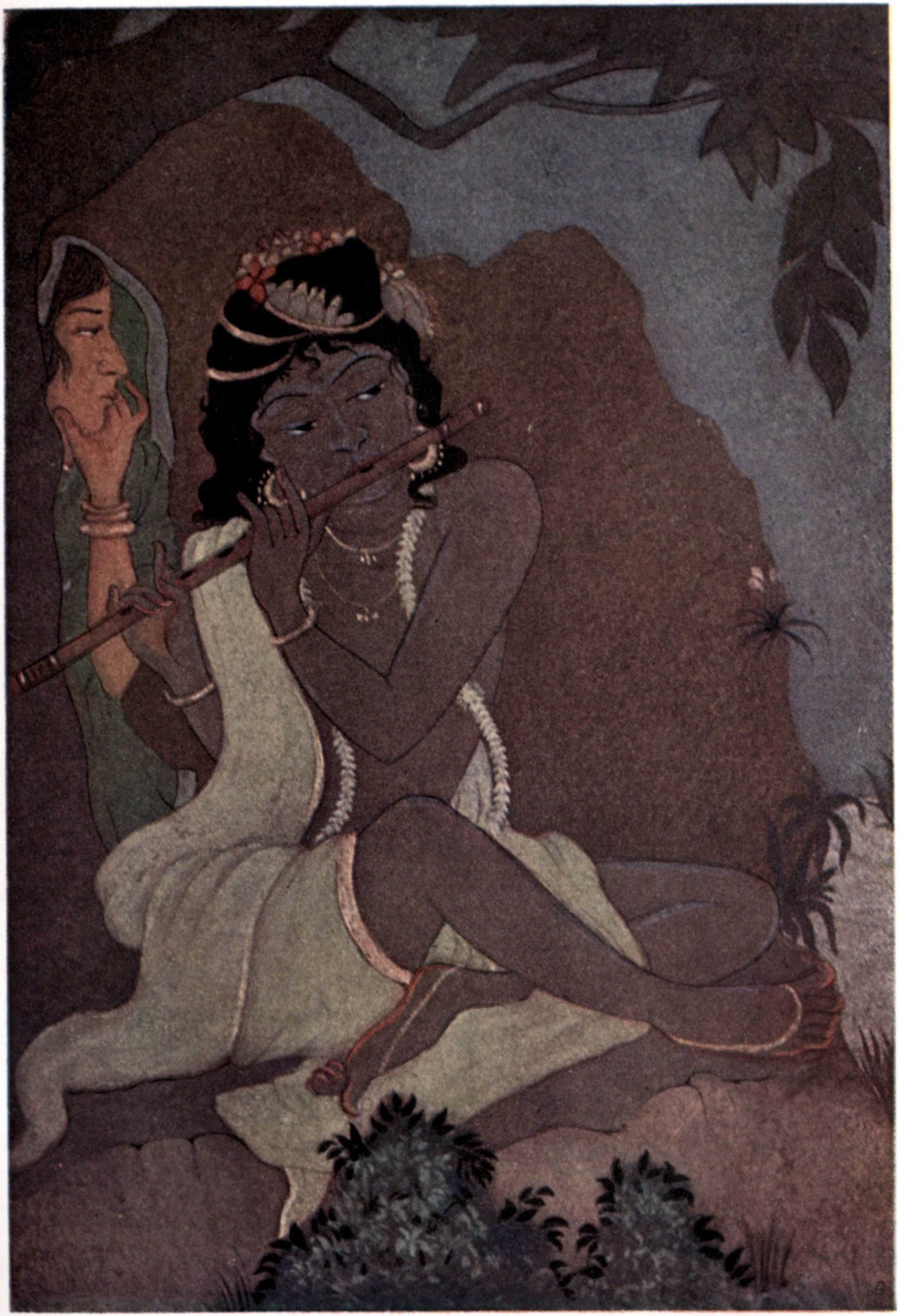
Radha and Krishna

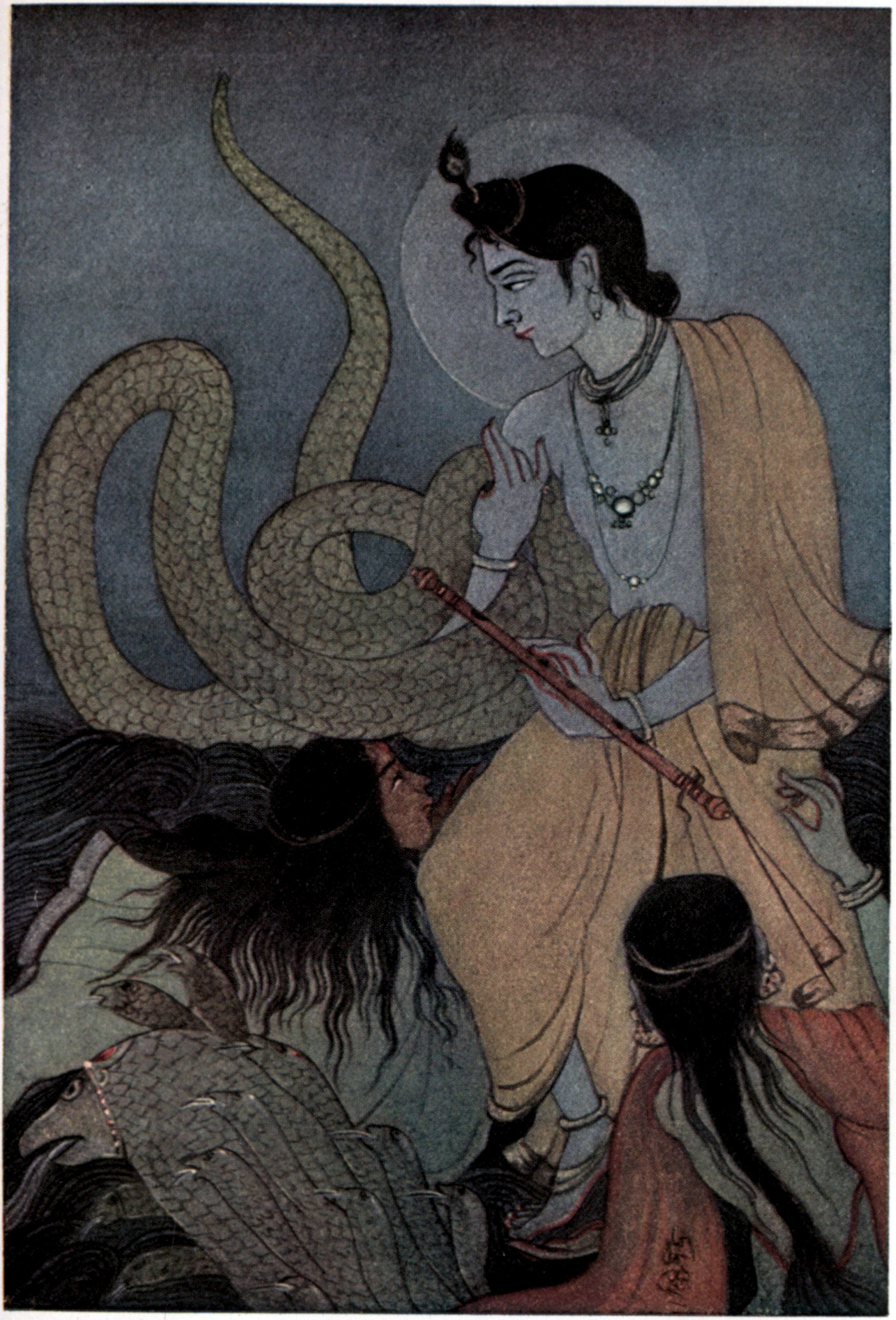
Kaliya Damana

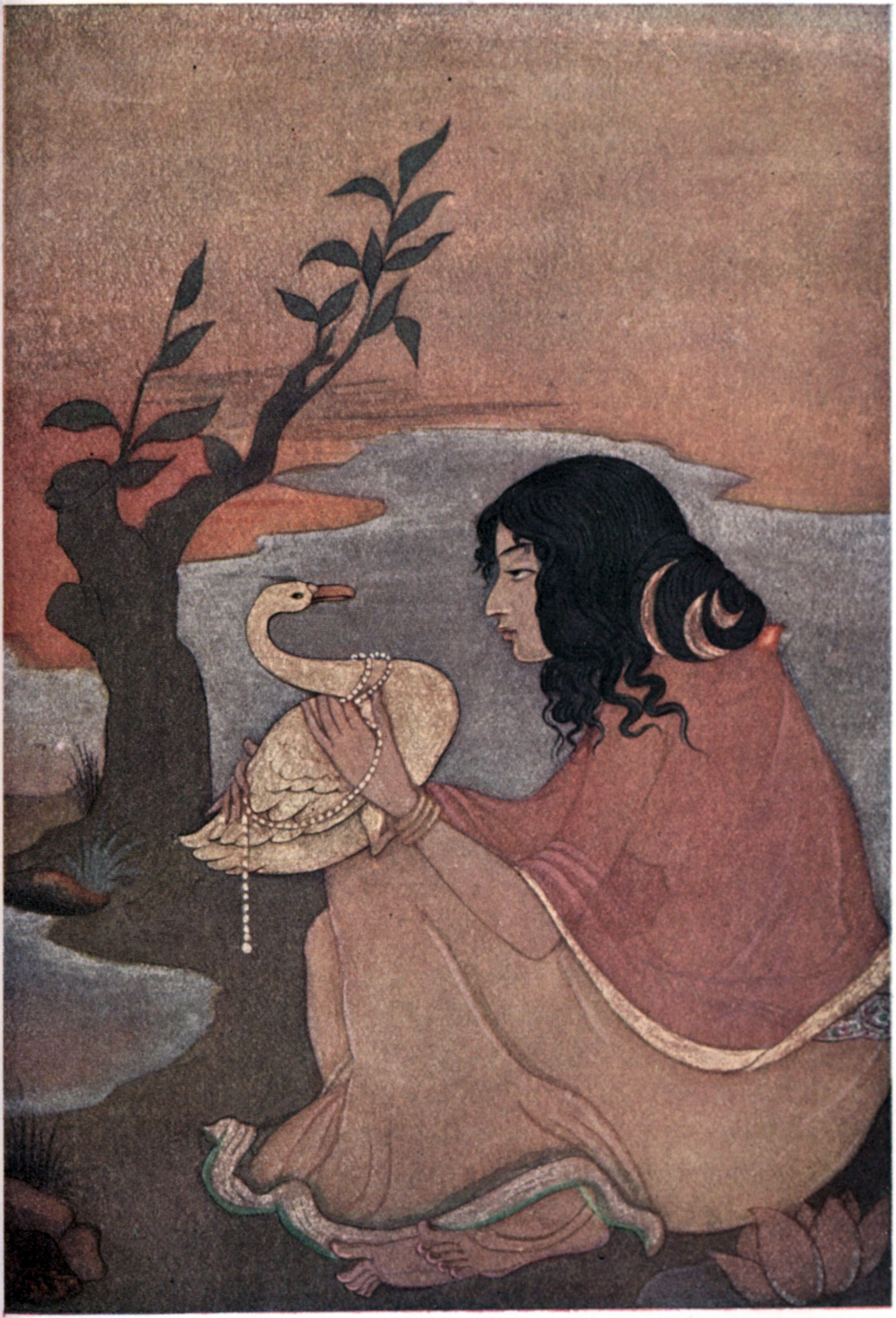
Damayanthi

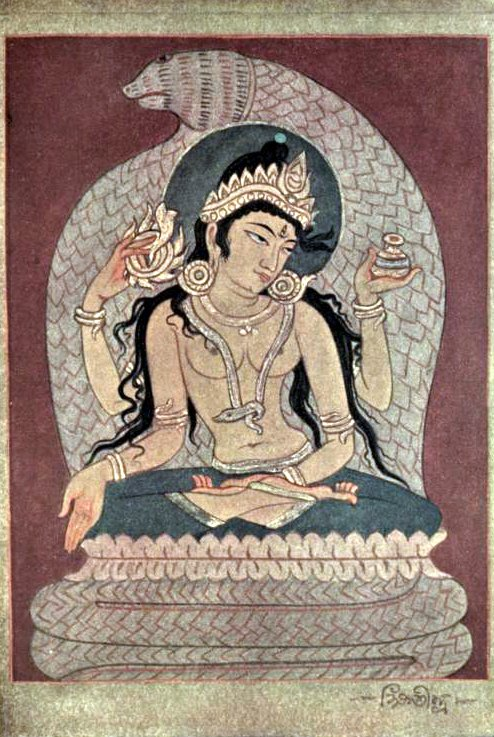
Manasa

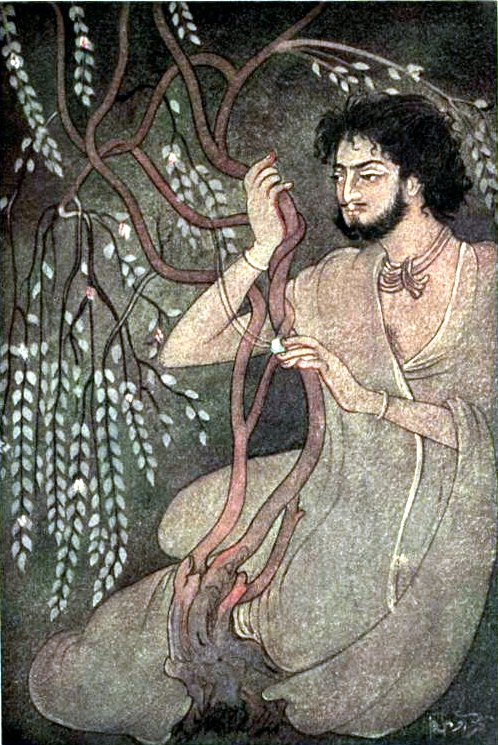
Pururavas

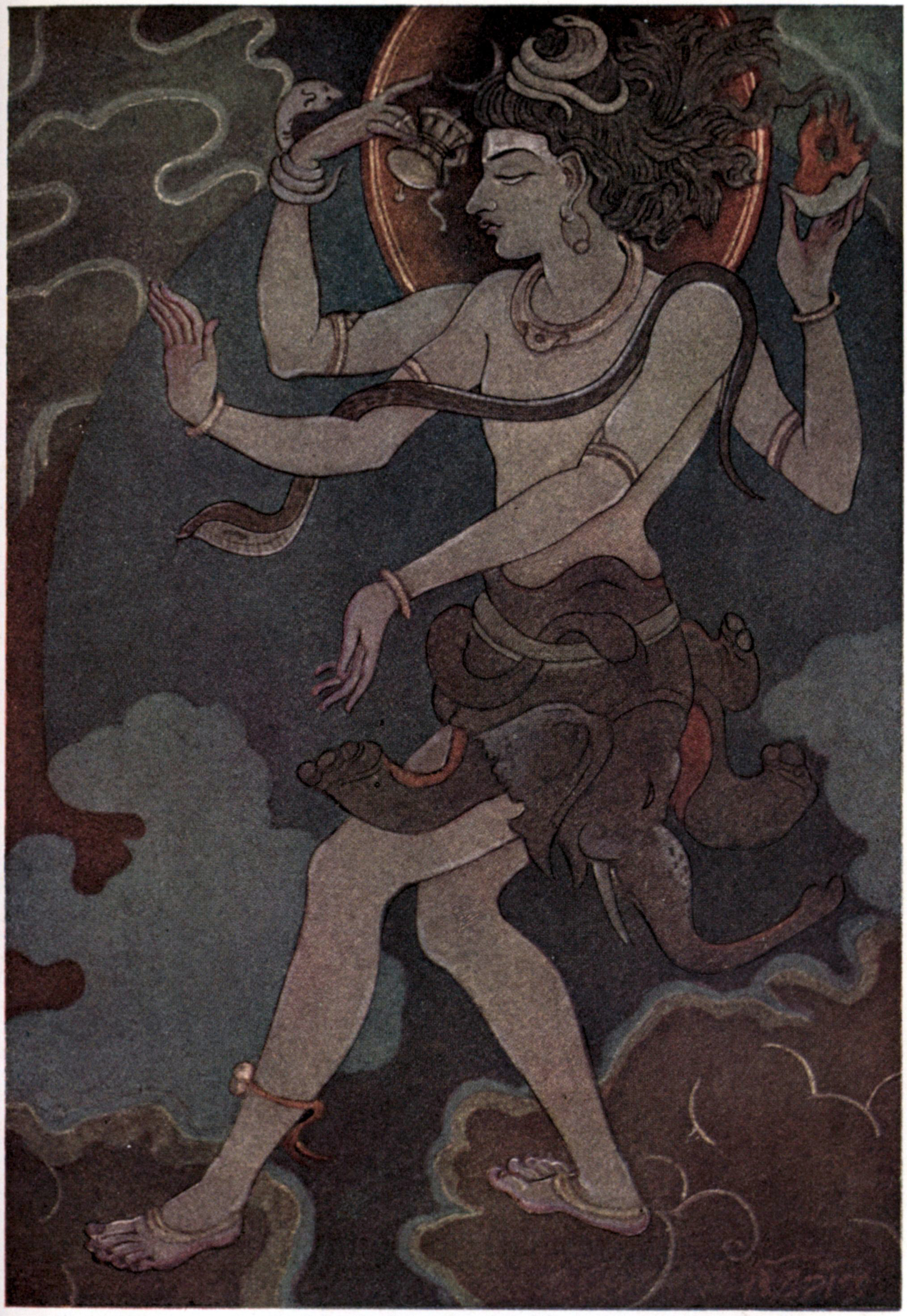
The Dance of Shiva
