= Kalipada Ghoshal =

Indian artist (1906–1995)

- Born: September 1906; Howrah, Bengal Presidency, British India (present-day West Bengal, India)
- Died: 29 April 1995 (aged 88); Howrah, West Bengal, India
- Known for: Painting
- Movement: Modern Indian Art

Kalipada Ghoshal (September 1906 – 29 April 1995) (Kalipada means he who is under Mother Goddess Kali). He was an artist from Calcutta. He was a well regarded student of the Indian Society of Oriental Art and a member of Abanindranath Tagore's Bengal school of art.

== List of paintings ==
Wash and Tempera

- Shakuntala (1922) Collector: Governor General Lord Reading
- Floral Presentation (Pushpa-upahar) (1922) Collector: Gaganendranath Tagore
- Vyas Guhaye Shankaracharya Meditating Saint Shankaracharya in cave (1927)
- JolSawa (Hindu Religious Practice on Auspicious Occasions (Hindu Marriages) (1928) Size: 20'x6'
- Shri Chaitanyer Abhishar (1928) Size: 10'x6' Collector: India House London
- Prashadhan of Shri Krishna (1928) Large Painting 10'x12'
- Persian Queen (Persian Night) Collector: Benito Mussolini's Daughter, Italy
- Shiva Parvati - Haro Parbati (1938)
- Wash Painting Shiva Durga (1942) Size: 11'x7' Collector: Rabindrabharati Museum
- Dushmanta Shakuntala (1943) Collector: Delhi Museum
- Ramer Samudrapuja Collector: Madras Museum
- Evening Toilet (Beauty Spa) Collector: Mumbai Museum
- Floral Character - Shephali Collector: Lucknow Museum
- Shiva Durga Collector: Bardwan Bardhaman Maharaja
- Tripura Shundari. Indian Folk Dance Saotal Nritya (Santal Dance) (1942–19) Collector: Tripura Royal Family
- Blooming Floral Beauty of Women (Prashphutita) Collector: Lord Jackson
- Pandavas Journey (Pandaber Mahaprashthan) Collector: N.C.Chatterjee, Kolkara
- Worshiping Devdashi (Natir Puja) Collector: Kamal Singha Roy of Amta Howrah.
- Saint Gautam Buddha with His Son Rahul . Collector Kanailala Sarbadhikari.
- Hindu Religious Goddess Maha Laxmi Collector: B.K. Saha of Radha Bazar Kolkata.
- Shatir Dehotyaag (1972) Collector : Rabindrabharati Museum
- Buddha (1972)
- Damayanti (1928)
- Series on Buddha
- Series on Krishna
- Series on Indian Ragas Raginis and on Hindustani Religious historical culture.
