= Bharat Mata (painting) =

1905 painting by Abanindranath Tagore

- Banga Mata
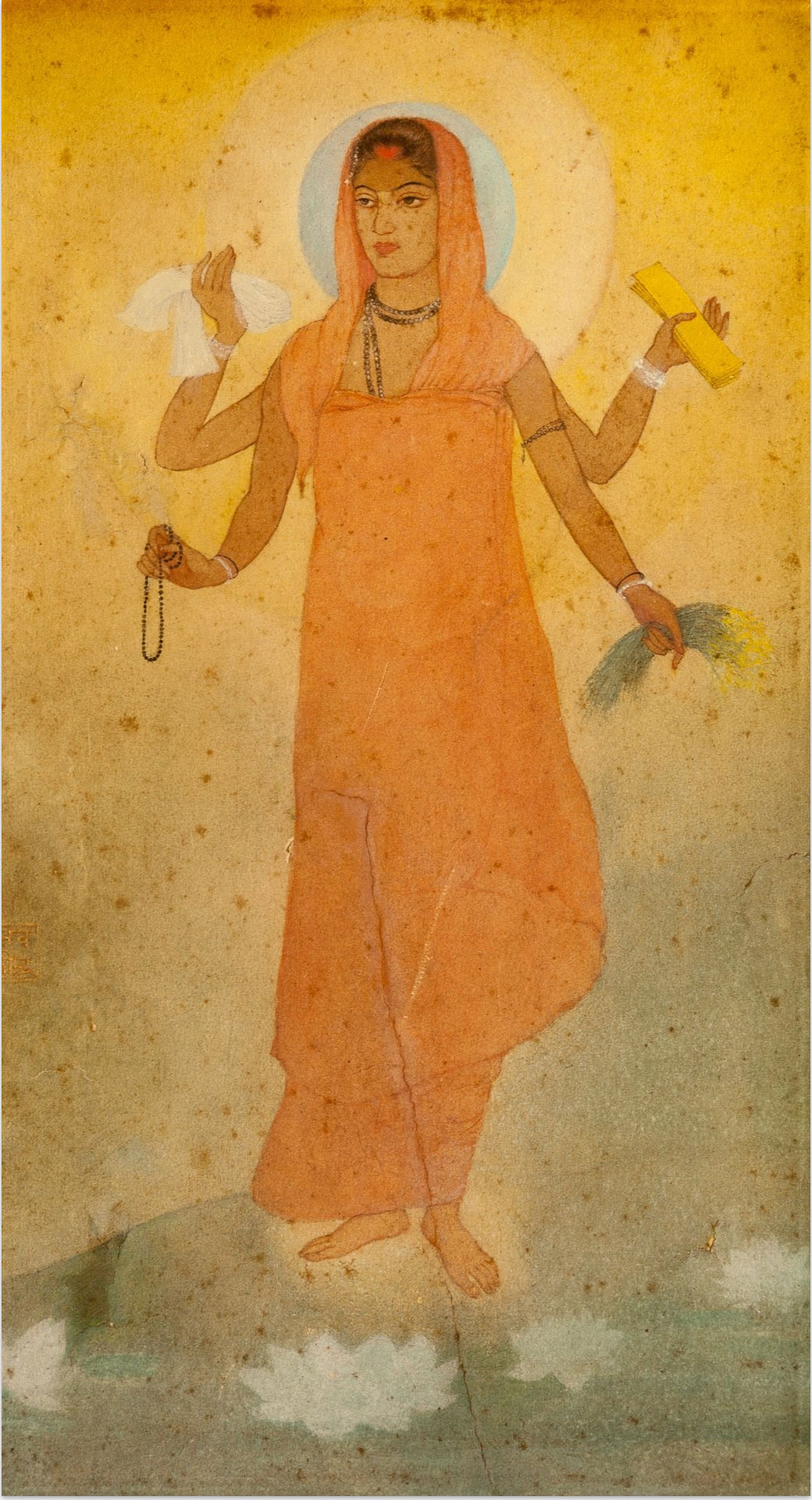
- Artist: Abanindranath Tagore
- Year: 1905
- Medium: Watercolour
- Movement: Swadeshi Movement
- Subject: Bharat Mata
- Dimensions: 26.67 cm × 15.24 cm (10 1/2 in × 6 in)
- Location: Victoria Memorial Hall, Kolkata, India
- Accession: RBS27ANT
- Website: https://www.museumsofindia.gov.in/repository/record/vmh_kol-RBS27ANT-16706

Bharat Mata is watercolour painting created by the Indian painter Abanindranath Tagore in 1905, originally titled Banga Mata (“Mother Bengal”) and later renamed Bharat Mata (“Mother India”). It is based on the personification of the nation as described by Bankim Chandra Chattopadhyay in his Anandamath. Tagore’s painting was a response to the Swadeshi Movement in India to promote anti-colonialism in Bengal. Bharat Mata was well-received by the Indian people as the art projected of Indian nationalism. The painting is located in Victoria Memorial Hall in Kolkata, India.

== Subject/symbolism ==
Bharat Mata features a full-length portrait of a woman standing with a glowing halo around her head and four white lotuses beneath her feet on patch of grass. At the center of the painting, the woman is depicted in a saffron-clad, holding a book, sheaves of paddy, a piece of white cloth and a rudraksh mala in her four hands. Each items represent learning, food, clothing and spiritual knowledge. The essence of the painting resembles the Hindu Goddess Lakshmi and Goddess Saraswati, embodying prosperity and knowledge. The painting holds historical significance as it is one of the earliest visualizations of Bharat Mata, or "Mother India."

The presence of divine energy is symbolized by the halo and lotuses. Her eyes depict sincerity and the four hands evoke Hindu imagery, equating to multiple hands with immense power. When Tagore painted the woman's facial features, he envisioned his daughter. Sister Nivedita remarked that his painting captured the sacredness while balancing the familiar touch of his daughter's face.

The painting has been characterized as "an attempt of humanisation of 'Bharat Mata' where the mother is seeking liberation through her sons," according to Jayanta Sengupta, curator of the Indian Museum in Kolkata, India.

== Medium ==
Watercolour was a medium Tagore was familiar with considering that he was born into a family of artists.

== Colour and composition ==
Tagore was heavily inspired by the Japanese 'wash.' This aesthetic captured soft, blurred natural colours and lines. Using this 'wash' technique, he elicited a tone of introspection in his subjects. This Japanese style of 'wash' accumulated traction, leading to a new trend of idealism and aestheticism to take place.

Tagore's art depicted a mood rather than the narrative or theatricalness aspect in European art. The sense of time and space is absent from his work which he deemed created ambivalent.

In 1902, Tagore's youngest daughter, Shah Jahan, died from the plague. To cope with his emotions, he painted her passing with oil on wood. He studied how the colours captured his emotions in his painting, arguing that colours could articulate a feeling that lines could not fully express express.

== Style, skill and technique ==
At an early age, Tagore was exposed to the artistic inclinations of the Tagore family. He was the nephew of the Indian poet and artist Rabindranath Tagore, and grandson to Girindranath Tagore. During the 1880s, Tagore was exposed to learning art when he first studied at the Sanskrit College in Kolkata. He had painted in the European naturalistic style, evident from his early paintings such as The Armoury.

Growing up, Tagore received formal art training from O. Ghilardi for six months until he grew tired from oil painting. During these private tutoring lessons, the Italian artist would teach him European portrait and still-life painting using pastels. Later, Tagore became a student of C.L Palmer, who helped hone his portrait and anatomy skills. He stopped attending after the lesson on human skull anatomy disturbed him.

With Ravi Varma being widely regarded as a successful modern Indian painter, Uncle Rabindranath gave Tagore references of Varma's work. Tagore took note of Varma's methods as scenes from Ramayana and Mahabharata were his source of painting inspirations.

Tagore was unsatisfied with his lessons with European art teachers and felt that Indian art better suited his desires. He turned to Indigenous painting techniques as well as gilding 'gold leaves.'

Approximately 1867-1887, Tagore's relative Gyanadanandini Devi had set up a meeting between Tagore and E.B Havell, who was the curator of the Government school of Art in Calcutta. The meeting resulted in a series of exchanges between Havell and Tagore, with Havell gaining a native art collaborator with ideas in the same direction of his own, and Tagore gaining a teacher who would teach him about the 'science' of Indian art history. He attempted to induct Tagore as the Vice Principal of the art school, which was faced with heavy opposition from the school.

Around 1902-1903, Tagore met Japanese artist Yokoyama Taikan through Kakuzo Okakura in Calcutta. Through Taikan, Tagore gained new knowledge on controlling lines and brushstrokes using the Japanese techniques. Tagore became intrigued by the soft colour palettes seen in Taikan's work and grew fond of Japanese paintings. He incorporated the Japanese 'wash' aesthetic into his Indian art through pale and hazy colours which over time became the style of 'wash' Tagore was known for, as shown in Bharat Mata.

Tagore favoured the Eastern art style opposed to the Western art style. He was discontent with the Western Academic practices which fueled him to use art as a form of self-expression to support nationalism and experiment with art new directions.

== Politics and iconography ==
Bharat Mata was created during the Swadeshi movement in Bengal, India. The movement began as a response to the Partition of Bengal (1905), when Lord Curzon split the largely Muslim eastern areas of Bengal from the largely Hindu western areas. In response, Indian nationalists participating in the Swadeshi movement resisted the British by boycotting British goods and institutions, holding meetings and processions, forming committees, and applying diplomatic pressure.

Tagore adopted the nationalist identity and resisted against the British colonial framework. Bharat Mata became an influential image for resilience. Thus, the painting was publicly recognized as being associated with the movement towards India's self-sufficiency from the Europeans, making it a Nationalist iconography. Briefly between 1905-1906, an enlarged silk banner of the painting was used to encourage donation proceeds for the movement.

However, in 1907, the increase in terrorist activities led Tagore and his family to step back from participating in the Swadeshi movement. He felt alienated when the movement became intensely political and violent, differing from the initial values of why he joined from the start.

== After completion ==
Since 1905, many iterations of the Bharat Mata have been made in paintings and other forms of art. In 2016, Bharat Mata was put on display at the Victoria Memorial Hall in Kolkata, India.

Sister Nivedita, the inspiration behind the Bengal School of Art, praised the painting by saying:

From beginning to end, the picture is an appeal, in the Indian language, to the Indian heart. It is the first great masterpiece in a new style. I would reprint- it, if I could, by tens of thousands, and scatter it broadcast over the land, till there was not a peasant's cottage, or a craftman's hut, between Kedar Nath and Cape Comorin, that had not this presentment of Bharat-Mata somewhere on its walls. Over and over again, as one looks into its qualities, one is struck by the purity and delicacy of the personality portrayed.

During the 2020 pandemic, Monal Kohad and Sandhya Kumari illustrated their version of Bharat Mata inspired by the events of the COVID-19 outbreak. Kumari portrays Bharat Mata with a facemask holding medical equipment. And Kohad illustrates Bharat Mata beheading the personified virus.

Alongside Bharat Mata, Tamilttay and Bhoodevi are also personified modern goddesses in Indian culture who share similar divine energy and spirit.

== Title and literary context ==
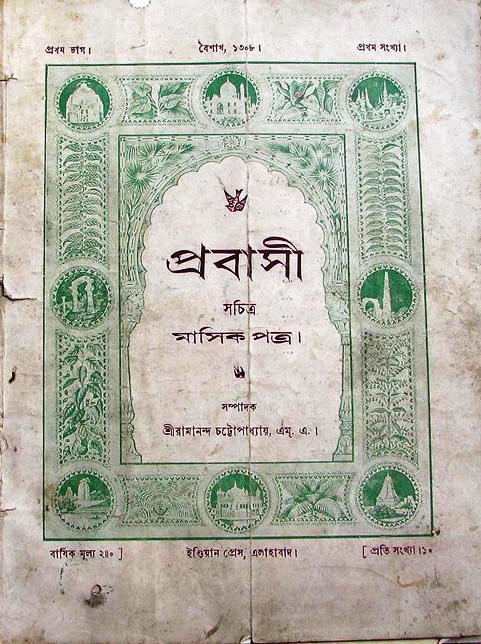
Prabasi Magazine

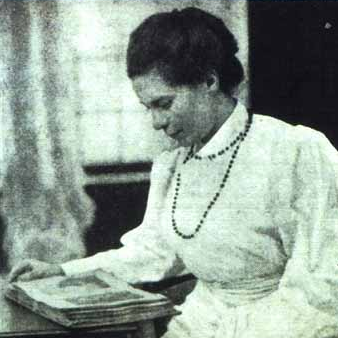
Sister Nivedita

This famous painting by Abanindranath Tagore did not have its now-popular title Bharat Mata when it was first published in the famous periodical of arts and culture, Prabasi. The caption to the image in the magazine read: Matrimurti. The word in Bengali means the "figure of the Mother." Contrary to the norms of the day, the artist's name was not featured alongside the caption.

Abanindranath Tagore had thought of titling the painting Banga Mata, meaning the Mother of Bengal. For the artist had based his representation on the common, everyday Bengali woman, and it was an ode to her. Yet the nationalist feelings that the painting evoked metamorphosed inTagore's Banga Mata to Bharat Mata, a pan-Indian figure, inspiring people across the length and breadth of the nation.

However, it was Sister Nivedita who rechristened the painting as Bharat Mata, noting down its iconography and politics of representation in detail. Nivedita was so enamoured by the painting that she wished to carry it from Kashmir to Kanyakumari to inspire the people in the mantra of Swadeshi.

The Prabasi magazine had subsequently featured prints of similar maternal icons during this period of the Swadeshi. These included: a painting of St. Genevieve, the patron saint of Paris, painted by Pierre-Cécile Puvis de Chavannes, and a painting of Madonna, by Dagnan-Bouveret, the French naturalist painter. Dagnan-Bouveret's painting was also titled Matrimurti. These female icons and their paintings expressed a similar idea of purity, resistance and freedom embodied in the feminine figure of the mother. By labelling Tagore's painting as Bharat Mata, Nivedita brings it to the same level as that of the Christian female icons. Thus, she links Tagore's canvas with European art's convention of embodying the spirit of the country and patriotism in the figure of a mother. Through this she counters both the British and its colonial subjugation of India, and gives to the Indians a concrete mother figure with which they can relate, and associate their idea of the nation, and be inspired to participate in Swadeshi.

Tagore's Bharat Mata, the DAG Museums note, is linked with the Swadeshi art and the rejuvenation of a Pan-Asian identity and aestheticism.
