= Sunayani Devi =

Indian painter (1875–1962)

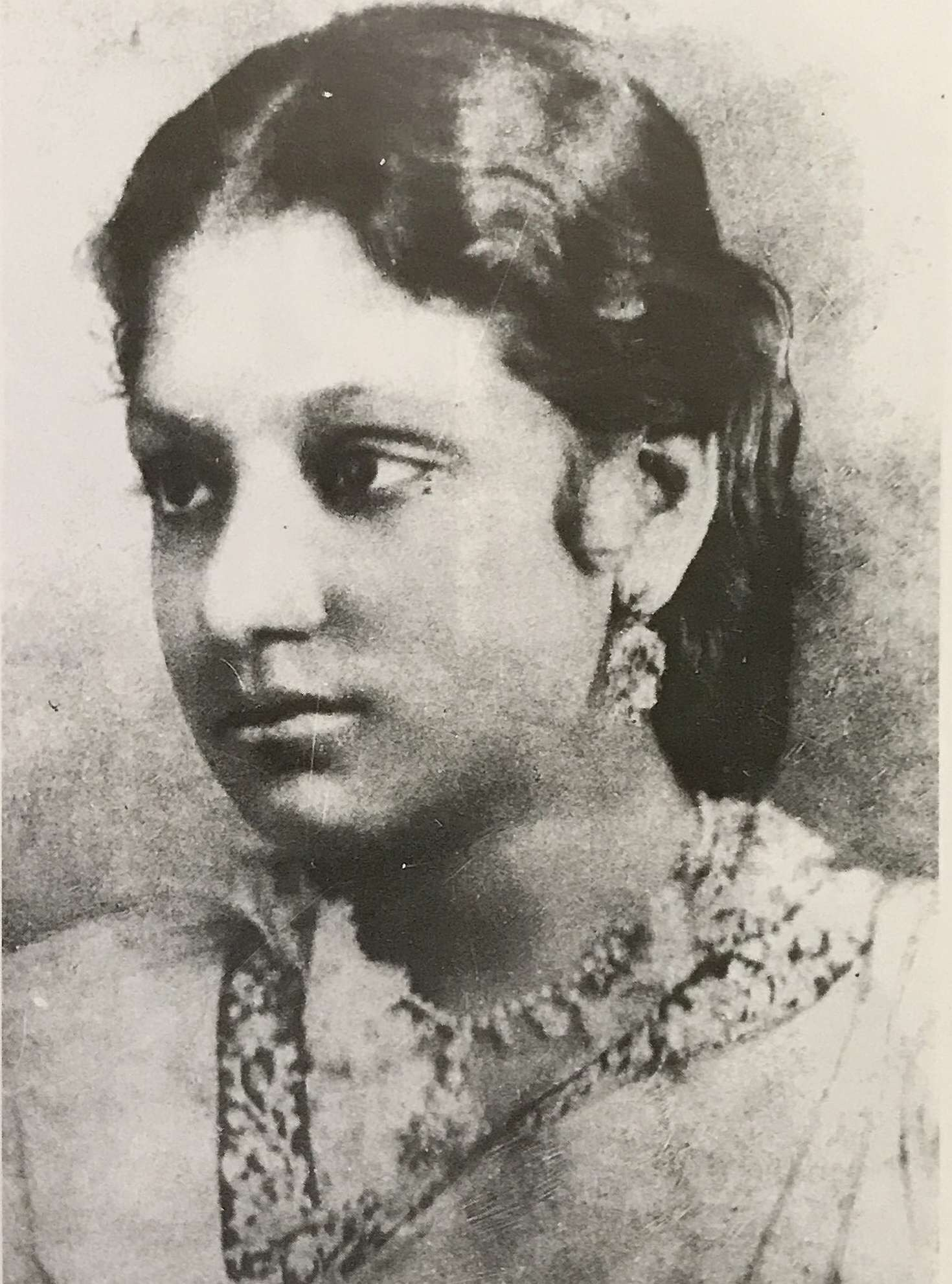
- Born: Sunayani Devi; 18 June 1875; Calcutta, Bengal presidency, British India
- Died: 23 February 1962 (aged 86); Calcutta, West Bengal, India
- Known for: Painting

Sunayani Devi (18 June 1875 – 23 February 1962) was an Indian painter born into the aristocratic Tagore family in Calcutta, West Bengal. She was a self taught artist, with no academic training in art. Inspired by her brothers, Abanindranath Tagore, Gaganendranath Tagore, and Samarendranath Tagore, she started painting only at the age of 30. She was married at the age of 12 to the grandson of Raja Ram Mohan Roy.

== Early life ==
Sunayani Devi was born on 18 June 1875 in the historically influential Tagore family in Calcutta to Gunendranath Thakur and Soudamini Devi. She was married at the age of 12 to Rajanimohan Chattopadhyaya. According to the writer, Partha Mitter, she never had formal training in art other than the art and music lessons as feminine accomplishments.

== Painting style and themes ==
Known to be a true primitive of the Bengal Art School, she drew inspiration from the Pata folk painting style which was familiar to the women of the Tagore household, often depicting scenes from Indian epics and mythologies in her works. Some of her notable works are Sadhika, Ardhanarisvar, Satir Dehatyag, Milk Maids and Yashoda and Krishna. According to Stella Kramrisch, she was the first modern painter in India. Her works were exhibited in 1922 as part of the Bauhaus artists' exhibition in Calcutta. Since the beginning, her works have been original and bold. They resemble the ancient Jain manuscript paintings. She applied wash technique to its fullest and later her works echoed the native imagery like village clay dolls that would be used as ornamentation. Her works are an amalgamation of modernist dialogue of primitive simplicity and a larger national discourse of being rooted in its cultural identity, thus carving her image as a nationalist artist. Critical analyses of her portraits, have led her to be addressed as a naive painter, who used folk themes with allure and sensitivity.

== Exhibitions ==
Among Devi's exhibitions are:

- 1908, 10, 12 Exhb., Indian Society of Oriental Art, Calcutta
- 1911 United Provinces Exhb. organised by Indian Society of Oriental Art, Allahabad
- 1911 Festival of Empire, organised by Indian Society of Oriental Art for George V's coronation, Crystal Palace, London
- 1924 Travelling exhb. organised by Indian Society of Oriental Art and American Federation of Art, USA
- 2004 Manifestations II, organised by Delhi Art Gallery, Jehangir Art Gallery, Mumbai and Delhi Art Gallery, New Delhi
- 2011 Summer Oasis, organised by Chitrakoot Art Gallery, Kolkata

== Museums ==
Sunayani Devi's paintings are part of the collection of many museums, including:

- Indian Museum Kolkata
- National Gallery of Modern Art, Bangalore
- National Gallery of Modern Art New Delhi
- National Art Gallery, Chennai
- Sree Chitra Art Gallery, Thiruvananthapuram
- Jaganmohan Palace, Mysore
- University of Lucknow
- Rabindra Bharati University Museum, Kolkata
- Academy of Fine Arts, Kolkata
