= The Passing of Shah Jahan =

1902 painting by Abanindranath Tagore

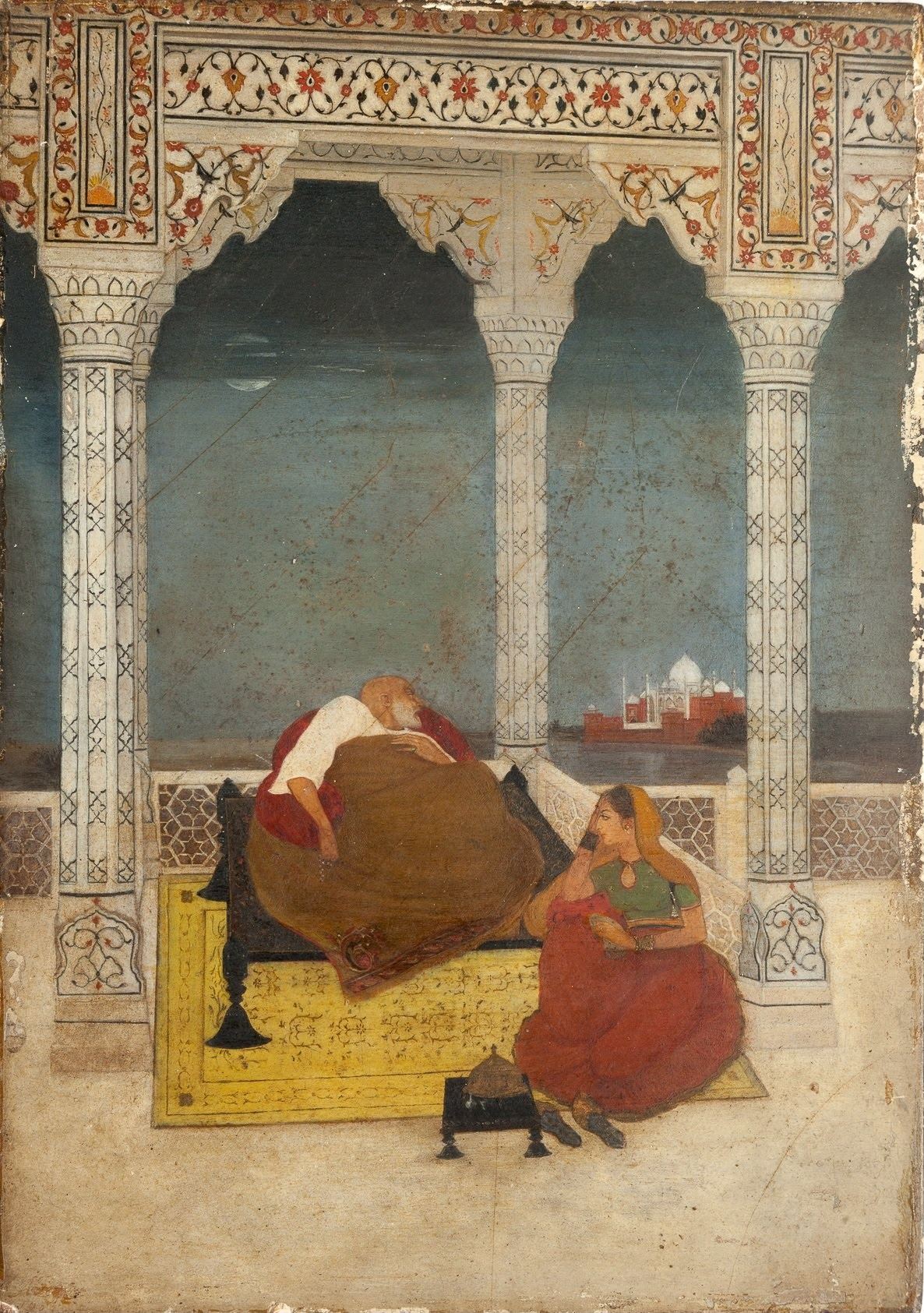
- Artist: Abanindranath Tagore
- Year: 1902
- Type: Miniature
- Location: Victoria Memorial; Kolkata

The Passing of Shah Jahan is a miniature painting by the Indian artist Abanindranath Tagore. The painting depicts the fifth Mughal Emperor Shah Jahan staring at the Taj Mahal on his deathbed, with his daughter Jahanara Begum at his feet. Initially involved with the dominant style of European Naturalism, Tagore's mentor Ernest Binfield Havell had introduced him to various types of Indian art. Of these varieties, Tagore was most impressed with old Mughal miniatures, which often featured emotionless, but detailed illustrations of scenes and characters. Incorporating this style with the traditional Indian artistic concept of Bhava', or emotion, Tagore had painted a scene based upon the growing re-interest in Indian history during the British Raj.

The painting had helped to establish Tagore as one of the most well known Indian artists of his time. In addition to creating a whole new movement of Indian style painting, Tagore later on went to paint more artwork depicting nationalist and swadeshi themes during the time of the Indian independence movement.

== Background ==
Abanindranath Tagore was born on August 7, 1871 to Gunendranath Tagore. A nephew of the Indian poet and artist Rabindranath Tagore, Abanindranath was exposed at an early age to the artistic inclinations of the Tagore family.

Tagore had been exposed to learning art when he first studied at the Sanskrit College in Kolkata in the 1880s. In his early years, Tagore had painted in the European naturalistic style, evident from his early paintings such as The Armoury. In about 1886 or 1887, Tagore's relative Gyanadanandini Devi had set up a meeting between Tagore and E.B. Havell, who was the curator of the Government school of Art in Calcutta. The meeting resulted in a series of exchanges between Havell and Tagore, with Havell gaining a native art collaborator with ideas in the same direction of his own, and Tagore gaining a teacher who would teach him about the 'science' of Indian art history.

Havell attempted to induct Tagore as the Vice Principal of the art school, which was faced with heavy opposition in the school. Havell had to bend much of the school rules to do this, and tolerated many of Tagore's habits including the smoking of hookah in the classrooms and refusing to stick to time schedules. Havell introduced innovations to his teaching program in an attempt to more accurately reproduce Indian art pedagogy, and replaced European copies of art with Indian originals. The English art curator had also reportedly spent many hours behind closed doors explaining the details of "Hindu art and sculpture" to Tagore. One of these paintings, of a stork by a Mughal-era artist, had been shown to Tagore by Havell, causing the former to remark that he was unaware until then of the "embarrassment of riches" that "our art" had contained.

== Subject ==
The Passing of Shah Jahan depicts a scene with the fifth Mughal Emperor Shah Jahan, who had commissioned in his lifetime the Taj Mahal as a mausoleum for his favorite wife Mumtaz Mahal. The architectural facade which frames the painting clearly represents a painstaking replication of marble inlay work decoration and complex railing patterns. The painting's attention is concentrated upon two main figures: the dying Shah Jahan and his daughter Jahanara Begum at the end of his bed, while the Mughal emperor's gaze is drawn to a small depiction of the Taj Mahal in the upper corner.

== Themes and composition ==
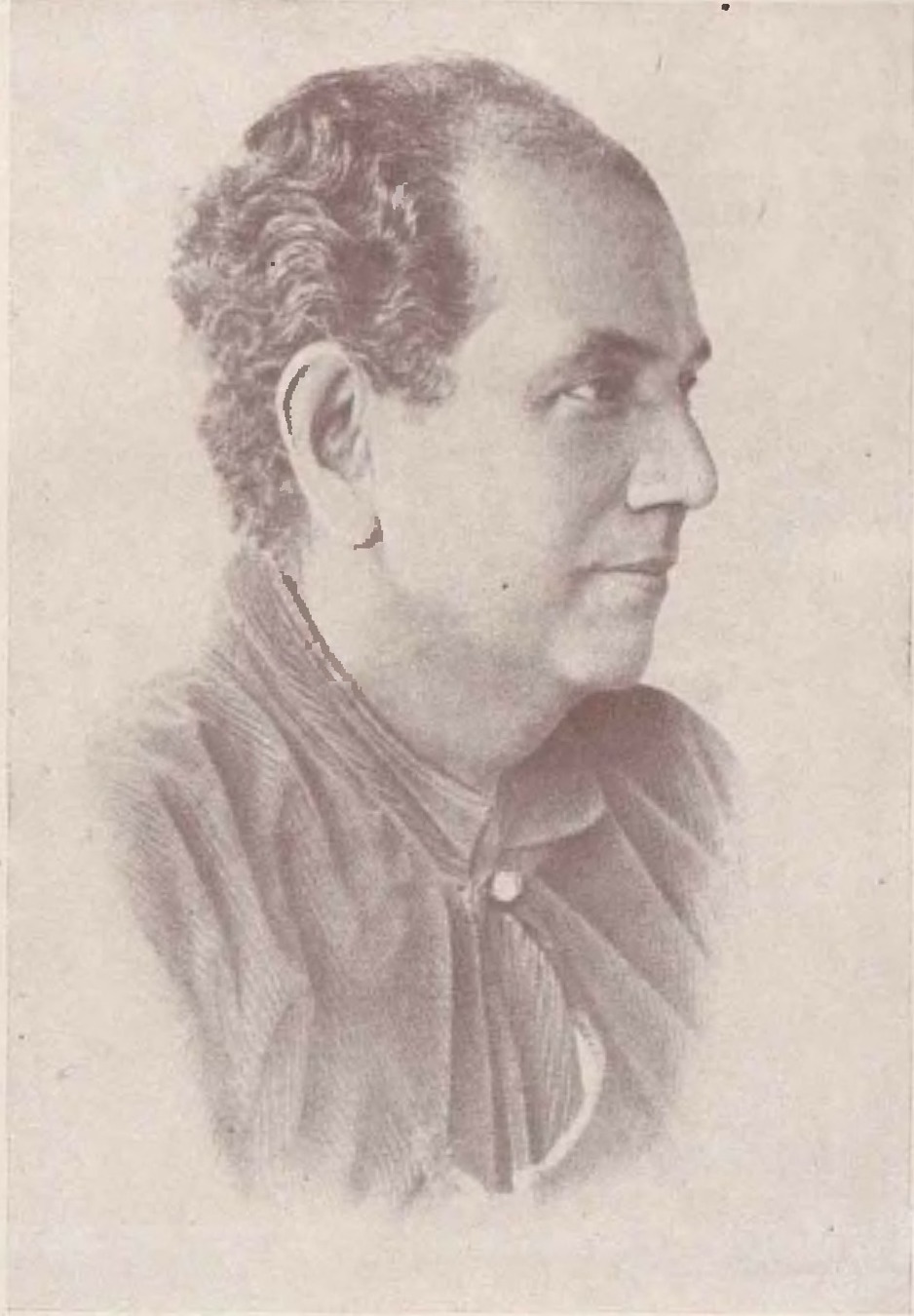
A portrait of Abanindranath Tagore. After the success of The Passing of Shah Jahan, Tagore had received widespread acclaim and worked on more paintings incorporating Indian themes.

Earlier renderings of the subject in literature had focused on Mughal wars of succession, and depicted Shah Jahan as an aging king whose illness and weakness had been the cause of instability and war. Locked in his room in the Red Fort by his son Aurangzeb, Shah Jahan was seen as a 'poor palace builder' whose only achievement was his monument to love: the Taj Mahal. Many British colonial authorities had gone further and sought to differentiate between the current regime and that of the Mughals, in order to demonstrate the lasting vitality of the British colonial Empire. Tagore's painting fits this description due to the widely available Colonial literature and attitude of the day.

E.B. Havell's interest in monuments and sculpture never found a place with Tagore. What had attracted him the most was the intimacy of relationship found in Indian art which was further exemplified by the selective realism in Mughal miniatures. Realism not in terms of surfaces, but rather of expressions. The three major types of painting that were to have inspired Tagore were British watercolor painting, Mughal miniatures, and Japanese painting. The incorporation of these styles is evident in The Passing of Shah Jahan. Tagore moved from a normative realism used as a tool for objective expression, into a freer naturalism that would draw attention to specific areas through realism.

Tagore's works typically have no anonymity in form, and themes of individualism are almost always present; this has met with some criticism amongst art critiques. In addition, Tagore sought to incorporate Bhava, or feeling, into his artwork. This idea of 'feeling' was especially important to the 'Passing of Shah Jahan'; the painting had attempted to explain the romantic ideas of loss, focusing on Shah Jahan's imprisonment at the Red Fort and the loss of his wife. Prior to Tagore, this idea was never visualized, though many Mughal and Western artists had drawn many portraits and figures of Shah Jahan and other Mughal characters. However, neither group had attempted to illustrate the emotions of these characters nor did they contain narrative elements. Tagore's attempt to depict the pathos of Shah Jahan imprisoned in the Red Fort and his last look at the Taj Mahal was a revolutionary element in Indian painting, especially at a time when the study of Indian history gained attention by British colonialists and native Indian people.

== After completion ==
The Passing of Shah Jahan won several awards. It was first exhibited at the Delhi Durbar Exhibition of Arts and Crafts (1902-1903), where it had won a silver medal. The painting was next exhibited at the Congress Industrial Exhibition (1903) where it had won a gold medal. After Tagore had received public recognition for his works, many other artists had begun to incorporate the same themes and techniques.

Abanindranath. Tagore was eventually known to be one of the most well known Indian artists of his time, both in and outside of Bengal, due to the nationalist works during the swadeshi years. Tagore went on to become a founder of the new school of Indian-style painting, though this became a role he had increasingly distanced himself from during his later years.
