= Stella Kramrisch =

Austrian-American art historian

- Stella Kramrisch at the Himalayan Art installation at the Philadelphia Museum of Art in 1978.
- Born: May 29, 1896; Nikolsburg, Austria
- Died: August 31, 1993 (aged 97); Philadelphia, Pennsylvania
- Citizenship: American
- Education: University of Vienna
- Known for: Leading specialist on Indian art for most of the 20th century
- Spouse: Laszlo Nemenyi
- Awards: Padma Bhushan, Austrian Cross of Honor for Science and Art
- Scientific career
- Fields: Art history
- Workplaces: Kala Bhavana
- Thesis: The Essence of Early Buddhist Sculpture in India (1919)
- Academic advisors: Max Dvořák

Stella Kramrisch (May 29, 1896 – August 31, 1993) was an Austrian-American pioneering art historian and curator who was the leading specialist on Indian art for most of the 20th century. Her scholarship remains a benchmark to this day. She researched and taught Indian art history for more than six decades on three continents. After writing her dissertation on the essence of early-buddhist sculpture in India, she was invited to teach at Kala Bhavana in Shantiniketan (1922–24) and went on to teach at Calcutta University from 1924 to 1950. In Europe, Kramrisch worked at the Courtauld Institute, London (1937–1940). From 1950, she was professor at the University of Pennsylvania in the Department of South Asia Regional Studies, where she had been recruited by W. Norman Brown, in addition to being a prominent curator at the Philadelphia Museum of Art.

== Early life and education in Vienna ==
Stella Kramrisch was born on May 29, 1896, in Nikolsburg, Austria (now Mikulov, Czech Republic). She was trained as a ballet dancer growing up in Austria. When Kramrisch was about 10 her parents moved to Vienna. One day she came across a translation of the Bhagavadgita: "I was so impressed it took my breath away." She had found what she wanted to do in her life.

She enrolled at the University of Vienna, studying at the department of art history with Professors Max Dvořák and Josef Strzygowski. She focused her studies on Indian art and culture. Thus she learned Sanskrit and read philosophy, literature and anthropology. In 1919, she successfully completed her studies by earning her doctorate.

== Professional life in India ==
She traveled to London in 1919 as part of a university delegation to give three lectures at Oxford. Rabindranath Tagore heard her speak and invited her to come to India and teach at the Visva-Bharati University in Santiniketan in 1922. She was appointed professor of Indian art at the University of Calcutta in 1924. In same year she discovered Badami cave temples. She taught In kala Bhawan until 1950.

In 1924 her first monograph Principles of Indian Art was published in German, which was reviewed widely in various journals throughout Europe. In the 1920s Kramrisch kept traveling to Vienna to give lectures. Various articles of her colleagues in Vienna appear as English translations in the Journal of the Indian Society of Oriental Art which Kramrisch edited from 1933 onwards together with Abanindranath Tagore. Her seminal publication "Indian sculpture" (1933) was a profound analysis of Indian sculpture, conceptualized in size and format to function as an actual handbook.

After the British left India in 1947, her husband Laszlo Nemenyi opted to work for the new government of Pakistan and moved to Karachi. In 1950 he was found shot dead on a beach. She emigrated to America the same year.

== Professional life in the United States ==
Stella Kramrisch moved to the United States in 1950, invited by the Sanskritist W. Norman Brown to teach in the newly formed Department of South Asia Regional Studies at the University of Pennsylvania. She was Professor of South Asian Art until her retirement in 1969. She was also adjunct professor of Indian Art at the Institute of Fine Arts in New York from 1964 to 1982. She served as the Curator of Indian Art at the Philadelphia Museum of Art from 1954 until 1979 and was Curator Emeritus until her death.

During her tenure at the Philadelphia Museum of Art, Kramrisch developed its holdings in Indian and Himalayan art and staged a series of ambitious exhibitions that, accompanied by the catalogues and related studies that she wrote, brought significant recognition to the museum and to the field of Indian art and culture. One such exhibition opened in 1968. Entitled "Unknown India: Ritual Art in Tribe and Village," it showcased nearly 500 religious and secular objects. After twelve years of planning, research and negotiations, another ground-breaking exhibition, "Manifestations of Shiva" opened in 1981. It was the first major exhibition in this country to examine the religious deity and to explore the multiple interpretations of its meaning. Many of the 197 objects displayed had never before left India. As to the museum's own collections, Kramrisch oversaw important acquisitions, including a 6th-century bronze mask of Shiva, a bronze figure of Rama made during the Chola dynasty of Southern India, and "Radha and Krishna," a painting by a Kishangarh school artist.

Her books include Grundzüge der Indischen Kunst (Principles of Indian Art; 1924; her first book), The Hindu Temple vols. 1 & 2 (1946; re-printed and in global circulation), The Art of India: Traditions of Indian Sculpture, Painting And Architecture (1954), and the encyclopedic The Presence of Siva (1981). She was a friend of the ballerina, designer, actress, and collector Natacha Rambova. Barbara Stoler Miller and Wayne E. Begley were among her students. Prof. Kramrisch was succeeded by Michael W. Meister in 1976 who is currently the W. Norman Brown Professor of South Asia Studies and History of Art at the University of Pennsylvania.

Kramrisch died on August 31, 1993, at her home in Philadelphia, Pennsylvania.

== Awards and honors ==
Kramrisch received worldwide recognition for her many achievements, including honorary degrees from Visvabharati University (1974) and from the University of Pennsylvania (1981). At a ceremony held at the Philadelphia Museum of Art in 1979, Kramrisch was given the Austrian Cross of Honor for Science and Art, and in 1985 she received the Charles Lang Freer Medal for her contribution to the "understanding of Oriental civilization as reflected in their arts." Perhaps the most telling statement of Kramrisch's life's work came in 1982 when the Indian government presented her with its highest civilian honor of Padma Bhushan. Kramrisch received the honor for "stimulating a renewed interest not only in the artistic heritage of India but also in its underlying philosophies and world view."

== Legacy ==
At the time of her death, Kramrisch left a bequest of 25 works to the Philadelphia Museum of Art. She also donated her papers to the museum, which in many ways form the greatest scope of her legacy. The Stella Kramrisch papers house her correspondence, writings and other research materials from 1921 to 1999, and contain information about the art objects in Kramrisch's personal collection. In addition, Kramrisch's curatorial position was officially re-titled as the Stella Kramrisch Curator at the Philadelphia Museum of Art, a position which still exists today. As noted in the Philadelphia Museum of Art's published memorial, Kramrisch's writings were even more far-reaching as many of her books continue to be used in universities around the world.

== Selected bibliography ==
- Grundzüge der Indischen Kunst. Avalun Verlag, 1924.
- The Visnudharmottaram: A Treatise on Indian Painting and Image-Making. Calcutta University Press, 1928.
- "Indische Kunst", in: Handbuch der Kunstgeschichte, hg. v. Anton Springer. Alfred Kröner Verlag, 1929.
- Indian Sculpture. The Heritage of India Series. Oxford University Press, 1933.
- The Hindu Temple. 2 Bd. University of Calcutta, 1946.
- Unknown India: Ritual Art in Tribe and Village. Philadelphia Museum of Art, 1968.
- Presence of Śiva. Princeton University Press, 1981.
