= Indian Society of Oriental Art =

Former art society in Kolkata, India

The Indian Society of Oriental Art was an art society founded in Calcutta in 1907 by Abanindranath Tagore. It organised art exhibitions, taught students, and published high-quality reproductions and illustrated journals.

== About the Society ==
Details of the Society were published in its Journal as follows in 1920:

"The Society was founded in the year 1907 with the object of cultivation by its members, and the promotion amongst the public, of a knowledge of all branches of ancient and modern Oriental Art by means of the collection by its members of objects of such art and the exhibition of such collections to the Society; the reading of papers; holding of discussions; the purchase of books and journals relating to art; correspondence with kindred Societies or Collectors and Connoisseurs; the publication of a Journal, and by such other means as the Society may hereafter determine; as also the furtherance of modern Indian Art by means of the holding of public loan exhibitions of objects of ancient and modern, and, in particular, Oriental Art owned by members of the Society or others; the encouragement and assistance of Indian artists, art students and workers in artistic industries by amongst other means, help given to them by the Society towards the disposal of their work, the holding of public exhibitions of works of modern Indian Art, the award of prizes and diplomas at such exhibitions, as also by such other means as the Society hereafter may determine."

== Founding ==
The Society was founded by brothers Gaganendranath Tagore and Abanindranath Tagore in Calcutta in 1907. Following annual exhibitions of the Tagore School of Art, showing the latest works of artists in the new movement in Indian painting (initiated by Abanindranath Tagore, under the guidance of E.B. Havell) at the Government School of Art, Calcutta, the Indian Society of Oriental Art was founded in 1907, sponsored by a group of Europeans in Calcutta. The first officers were Lord Kitchener (President), Norman Blount and Abanindranath Tagore (Secretaries). Early members included Lord Kitchener, Mr Justice Woodroffe (John Woodroffe), Mr Justice Rampini (Robert Fulton Fulton), Mr Justice Holmwood (Herbert Holmwood), Mr Justice Ashutosh Chaudhuri, Mr Ruebenson (Sweden), Mr Hjalmar Pontén-Möller (Sweden), Norman Blount (jute broker), Maharaja Jagadindranath Roy of Natore, Maharajadhiraja Bijay Chand Mahtab of Burdwan, Mr J. Chaudhuri, and Mr Surendranath Tagore.

== Presidents of the Indian Society of Oriental Art ==
- Lord Kitchener
- Mr Justice Woodroffe
- Lord Carmichael
- Maharajadhiraja of Burwan
- Sir Rajendranath Mukherjee
- Sir Charles Kesteven

== School ==
A school was opened at 6 Samavaya Mansions, in the Hindusthan Insurance Building, Hogg Street, Calcutta. Students were taught by Nandalal Bose, Kshitindranath Mazumdar, Giridharilal of Orissa (sculpture), and supervised by Abanindranath and Gaganendranath Tagore. Students trained at the school included S. Venkatappa, Hakim Khan, Sami-uz-Zama, Roop Krishna, Pramodekumar Chattopadhyaya, Deviprasad Ray Chaudhuri, Bireswar Sen, Sailendranath De, Surendranath Kar, and Chanchalkumar Bandyopadhyaya.

== Exhibitions ==
Annual exhibitions were held at Samavaya Mansions. They were not limited to Indian art, and there was a very popular exhibition of Japanese prints. The Society's exhibition in Paris in 1914 was the first exhibition of Indian Modern Art in Europe. The Society organised a Bauhaus exhibition in Calcutta in 1922.

== Publications ==
=== Journal of the Indian Society of Oriental Art ===
First issued in 1933, the journal published articles and reviews, with high quality illustrations. The editors were Abanindranath Tagore and Stella Kramrisch. Contributors included K.P. Jayaswil, Percy Brown, G. Coedes, G. Yazdani, B.B. Dutt, Zoltan de Takacs, S. Krishnaswami Aiyangar, G.S. Dutt, P.V. Jagadisha Ayyar, Niharranjan Roy, Stella Kramrisch, Khitindra N. Mazumdar

- vol.15 (1947) - A.K. Coomaraswamy Special Commemoration Volume

=== Rupam ===
Described as "an illustrated quarterly journal of oriental art chiefly Indian", published from 1920 to 1930. Edited by O.C. Gangoly.
