= Ernest Binfield Havell =

British art historian (1861–1934)

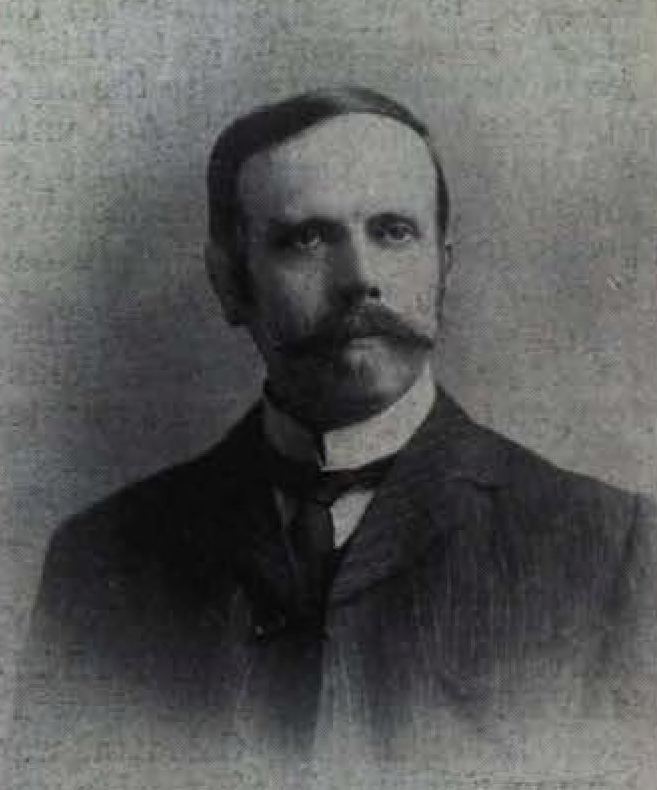
- Born: 16 September 1861; Reading, Berkshire, England
- Died: 31 December 1934 (aged 73)
- Occupations: Arts administrator, art historian, art critic

Ernest Binfield Havell (16 September 1861 – 30 December 1934), who published under the name E.B. Havell, was an influential English arts administrator, art historian and author of numerous books about Indian art and architecture. He was a member of the Havell family of artists and art educators. He was the principal of the Government School of Art, Calcutta from 1896 to 1906, where, along with Abanindranath Tagore, he developed a style of art and art education based on Indian rather than Western models, which led to the foundation of the Bengal school of art. Havell has three aims, including to revalue art as high art, revise British policy, and revitalize Indian design and craft.

== Early life ==
Ernest was born at Jesse Terrace, Reading in the English county of Berkshire in 1861, the son of an artist Charles Richard Havell and his wife, Charlotte Amelia Lord. The family had several artists and publishers. He went to Reading School and learned art at the Royal College of Art and in Paris and Italy. He married with Lili Jacobsen in 1894 .

== Madras School of Art ==
In India, Havell initially served the Madras School of Art as Superintendent for 8 years from 1884-1892. During his serve, he reported to government on Indian industrial art, investigated handicrafts, and started handloom weaving revival that Gandhi later supported. Havell blamed "Macaulayism", which is the British policy of Western-style education for harming Indian cultural confidence.

== Government School of Art, Calcutta ==
He arrived Calcutta and joined as Principal of the Government School of Art, Calcutta. From a well known art journal of London,The Studio, Havell wrote that he abolished the antique class and "made Indian art the basis of teaching" in 1896. Furthermore, he replaced it with a method from Silpashastra, the Sanskrit texts on art. This method allowed the artist build the image in his mind, then puts on paper, with a model used only to form the mental image. However, it is hard to know how far it was practiced. Havell divided the school into industrial and fine art faculties, added an Indian section and auctioned or discarded European pictures.

While in England, he published two valuable articles on Indian art in the October 1902 and January 1903 issues of a well known art journal of London, The Studio. In 1906 he returned to England on a sick leave and was “later declared medically unfit” for service in India. In 1908, he retired from the education service.

Havell worked with Abanindranath Tagore, who became the vice principal of Government School of Art, Calcutta. Turner describes him as Havell's "pupil, collaborator and vice principal".

Furthermore, Indian Society of Oriental Art is a success of Havell's ideas with official support . It was co-founded by Colonial officials and Lord Kitchener as the chair, along with Abanindranath Tagore in 1907. He published several books on Indian art including Indian Sculpture and Painting (1908),The Ideals of Indian Art (1911), and Indian Architecture (1913). In his book Indian Architecture (1913), Havell argued that Indian craftsmen should be employed in building the new capital, with two aims: to show living Indian building still exist and Hindu and Buddhist design ideas underneath Indo-Islamic buildings.

He co-founded India Society with William Rothenstein in 1910, where Havell also lectured on Indian art at the Royal Society of Arts in February 1910. The formation of India Society was due to a comment from Sir George Birdwood, commented that India has no fine art tradition but praised and treated them as crafts. Therefore, William Rothenstein and a number of British figures wrote a letter to The Times disagreeing and affirming Indian fine art tradition. In March 1910, the society was formed at Havell's home.

== Critique ==
Jamal argued Havell defined Indianess through Aryan moment that legitimized British rule in India, where Havell tied Indian civilisation to the Indo-Aryans. Jamal argued Havell implies the British as the second 'moment" and the successor to rule in India

Banerji agreed Havell held imperialist and racist assumptions, but argued Jamal overstates how much politics explain his work, because Havell's idea also came from a critique of Western Industrial society.

Tapati Guha-Thakurta described the movement around Havell as an "alternative front in Orientalism"

== Personal life ==
He married Lili Jacobsen, daughter of a Danish navy officer and they have one daughter. He died at the Acland Nursing Home in Oxford.

== Works ==
Havell wrote numerous books on Indian art and history, including:

- Havell, E. B. (1903). The Taj and its designers. s.n.
- Havell, E. B. (1904). A Handbook to Agra and the Taj, Sikandra, Fatehpur-Sikri and the neighbourhood (1904). Longmans, Greens & Co., London.
- Havell, E. B. (1905). Benares, the sacred city: sketches of Hindu life and religion. Blackie and Sons Ltd., London.
- Havell, E. B. (1906). Monograph on stone-carving in Bengal. The Bengal Secretariat Book Depot.
- Havell, E. B. (1907). Essays on Indian art, industry & education. G. A. Natesan & Co., Madras.
- Havell, E. B. (1908). Indian sculpture and painting. John Murray, London.
- Havell, E. B. (1912). The Basis for Artistic and Industrial Revival in India. The Theosophist Office, Madras.
- Havell, E.B. (1913). Indian Architecture, its psychology, structure, and history from the first Muhammadan invasion to the present day. J. Murray, London.
- Havell, E. B. (1915). The Ancient and Medieval Architecture of India: a study of Indo-Aryan civilisation. John Murray, London.
- Havell, E. B. (1918). The History of Aryan Rule in India from the earliest times to the death of Akbar. Frederick A. Stokes Co., New York.
- Havell, E. B. (1920). The Ideals of Indian art. E. P. Dutton and Co., New York.
- Havell, E. B. (1920). A Handbook of Indian Art. John Murray, London.
- Havell, E. B. (1924). Himalayas in Indian art. Pilgrims Publishing. ISBN 81-7303-228-9.
