= Bengal School of Art =

Art movement and a style of Indian painting in the early 20th century

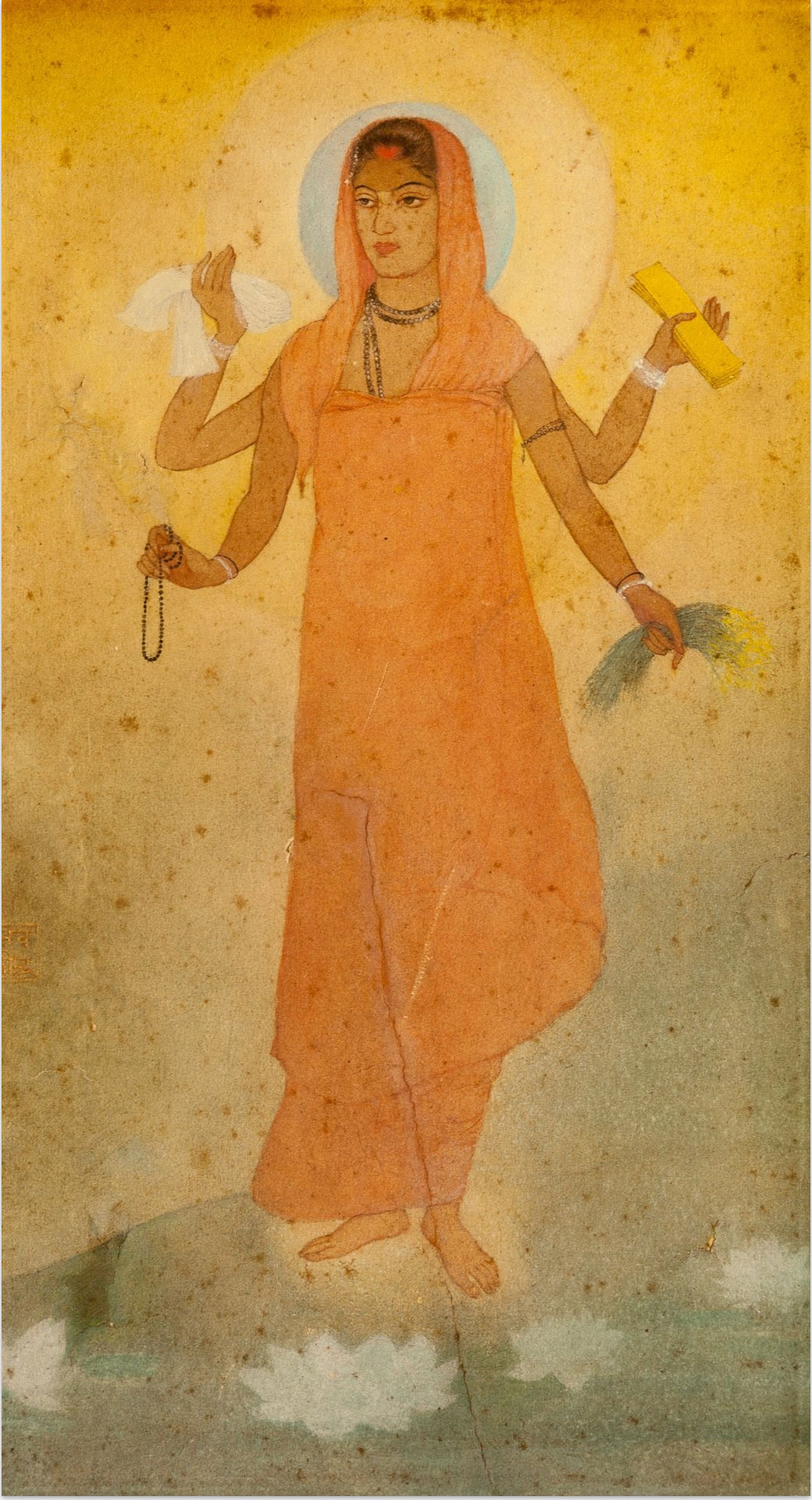
Bharat Mata (1905), by Abanindranath Tagore, a pioneer of the movement and Rabindranath Tagore's nephew.

The Bengal School of Art, commonly referred as Bengal School, was an art movement and a style of Indian painting that originated in Bengal, primarily Calcutta and Shantiniketan, and flourished throughout the Indian subcontinent, during the British Raj in the early 20th century. Also known as 'Indian style of painting' in its early days, it was associated with Indian nationalism (swadeshi) and led by Abanindranath Tagore (1871–1951), and was also being promoted and supported by British arts administrators like E. B. Havell, the principal of the Government College of Art and Craft, Kolkata from 1896; eventually it led to the development of the modern Indian painting.

== History ==
The Bengal school arose as an avant garde and nationalist movement reacting against the academic art styles previously promoted in India, both by Indian artists such as Raja Ravi Varma and in British art schools. Following the influence of Indian spiritual ideas in the West, the British art teacher Ernest Binfield Havell attempted to reform the teaching methods at the Calcutta School of Art by encouraging students to imitate Mughal miniatures. This caused controversy, leading to a strike by students and complaints from the local press, including from nationalists who considered it to be a retrogressive move. Havell was supported by the artist Abanindranath Tagore, a nephew of the poet Rabindranath Tagore. Tagore painted a number of works influenced by Mughal art, a style that he and Havell believed to be expressive of India's distinct spiritual qualities, as opposed to the materialism of the West. Tagore's best-known painting, Bharat Mata (Mother India), depicted a young woman, portrayed with four arms in the manner of Hindu deities, holding objects symbolic of India's national aspirations. Tagore later attempted to develop links with Japanese artists as part of an aspiration to construct a pan-Asianist model of art. Through the paintings of Bharat Mata, Abanindranath established the pattern of patriotism. Some of the notable painters and artists of Bengal school were Nandalal Bose, Jamini Roy, M.A.R Chughtai, Sunayani Devi (sister of Abanindranath Tagore), Manishi Dey, Mukul Dey, Kalipada Ghoshal, Asit Kumar Haldar, Sukhvir Sanghal Sudhir Khastgir, Kshitindranath Majumdar and Sughra Rababi.

The Bengal school's influence in India declined with the spread of modernist ideas in the 1920s. As of 2012, there has been a surge in interest in the Bengal school of art among scholars and connoisseurs.

Bimal Sil was a contemporary of Abanindernath Tagore. He painted in water colours. His paintings are found in private collections only.

== R. Siva Kumar's disagreement ==
R. Siva Kumar, who has been studying the work of the Santiniketan masters and their approach to art since the early 80s, refutes the practice of subsuming Nandalal Bose, Abanindranath Tagore, Ram Kinker Baij and Benode Behari Mukherjee under the Bengal School of Art. According to Siva Kumar, 'This happened because early writers were guided by genealogies of apprenticeship rather than their styles, worldviews, and perspectives on art practice'.

His ideas on this issue are formulated in the catalogue essay of the exhibition Santiniketan: The Making of a Contextual Modernism.

== See also ==
- Contextual Modernism
- Modern Indian painting
- Progressive Artists' Group
- Tanjore painting
- Rajput painting
- Madhubani painting
