= Tagore (name) =

Origin
- Origin: Bengali Hindu
- Region of origin: Bengal

Tagore is a surname held by the Tagore family. Notable people with the surname include:

== Jorasanko branch of the Tagore family ==
A branch of the family based in the Jorasanko neighbourhood of Kolkata.

- Abanindranath Tagore (1871–1951), artist
- Debendranath Tagore (1817–1905), Brahmoism founder
- Dwarkanath Tagore (1794–1846), businessman and aristocrat
- Dwijendranath Tagore (1840–1926), writer, musician, and pioneer in Bengali shorthand and musical notations
- Gaganendranath Tagore (1867–1938), artist
- Ganendranath Tagore (1841–1869), musician and founder of Jorasanko Natyashala; a member of the Tagore family
- Hemendranath Tagore (1844–1884), nationalist, yogi, founder of Adi Dharm
- Jyotirindranath Tagore (1849–1925), musician
- Rabindranath Tagore (1861–1941), writer, performer, the first Asian to win the Nobel Prize in 1913. Composed the Indian and Bangladeshi national anthems
- Ramanath Tagore (1801–1877), social figure associated with British Indian Association and son of Nilmoni Tagore
- Satyendranath Tagore (1842–1923), musician, reformer, and the first Indian to join the ICS in 1863
- Swarnakumari Devi (1855–1932), female novelist
- Saumyendranath Tagore (1901–1974), son of Sudhindranath Tagore, fourth child of Dwijendranath Tagore, and nephew of Rabindranath Tagore, was the leader of the Revolutionary Communist Party of India, and the first translator of "The Communist Manifesto" into Bengali

== Pathuriaghata branch of the Tagore family ==
A branch of the family based in the Pathuriaghata neighbourhood of Kolkata.

- Gnanendramohan Tagore (1826–1890), first Asian to be called to the English bar in 1862; see List of members of Lincoln's Inn
- Gopimohan Tagore (1760–1819), one of the founders of Hindu College
- Jatindramohan Tagore (1831–1908), philanthropist
- Prasanna Coomar Tagore (1801–1886), lawyer and member of the Atmiya Sabha
- Prodyot Coomar Tagore (1873–1942), former Sheriff of Calcutta
- Sourindramohan Tagore (1840–1914), founder of the Banga Sangeet Vidyalaya and the Bengal Academy of Music
- Sharmila Tagore (b. 1944), film actor
