= Nilmoni =

Nilmoni may refer to:

- Nilamani, term for Sapphire in Sanskrit, the blue (nila) gem (mani)
- Krishna, the Hindu god also known as Nilamani, often depicted as blue skinned
- Nilmoni Phukan Sr, Assamese writer, poet, freedom fighter and politician
- Nilmoni Singha Dev, 19th-century Indian monarch
- Nilmoni Tagore, founder of the Jorasanko branch of Tagore family
