= Hara Kumar Tagore =

Bengali philanthropist and scholar (1798–1858)

- হরকুমার ঠাকুর
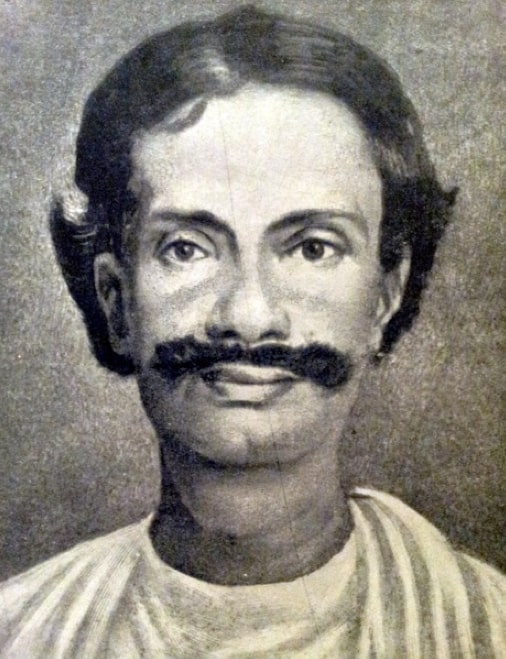
- Hara Kumar Tagore c.1838
- Born: 1798; Calcutta, Bengal Presidency, British India (now Kolkata, India)
- Died: 1858 (aged 59–60); Calcutta, Bengal Presidency, British India
- Predecessor: Gopi Mohan Tagore
- Successor: Jatindramohan Tagore
- Spouse: Shib Sundari Devi
- Children: Jatindramohan Tagore; Sourindra Mohan Tagore; Shoutindra Mohan Tagore (sons)
- Father: Gopi Mohan Tagore
- Relatives: Prasanna Kumar Tagore (brother), Prodyot Coomar Tagore +4 others (grandchildren)
- Family: Tagore family

Hara Kumar Tagore (1798–1858) was a Bengali landowner, Sanskrit scholar, writer, and patron of classical music from Calcutta. He belonged to the Pathuriaghata branch of the Tagore family.

== Biography ==
Born in 1798, Hara Kumar was the eldest son of Gopi Mohan Tagore. Following his father's death, he assumed leadership of the Pathuriaghata estate, managing extensive landholdings and family properties in nineteenth-century Calcutta.

He received an education in Hindu scriptures, Sanskrit, and English. Unlike many of his contemporaries who focused primarily on Western education during the Bengal Renaissance, Hara Kumar specialized in traditional Sanskrit scholarship and scriptural codification. He assisted Radhakanta Deb (1783–1867) in compiling the Sanskrit encyclopedia Sabdakalpadrum.

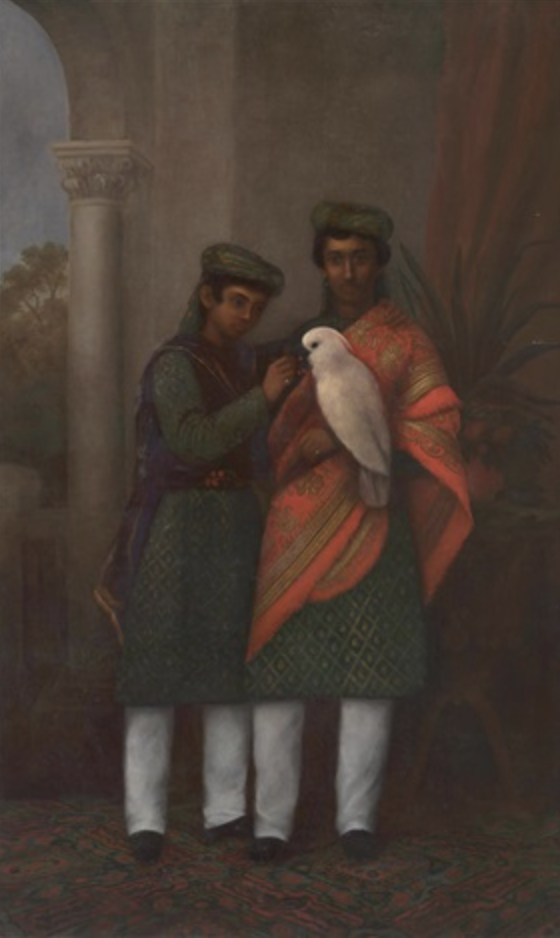
Young Hara Kumar Tagore and his brother Prasanna Kumar Tagore, ca. late 18th–early 19th century.

His written works primarily served as manuals for orthodox and esoteric Hindu practices. His compositions include Haratattva-didhiti (published posthumously in 1881), Purashcharana-bodhini (1895), and Shila-chakrarthabodhini, a treatise detailing various sacred stones (shilas) worshipped as symbols of Narayana. He also authored procedural manuals regarding Tantric rites and Kali worship. In addition to his literary work, he was trained in Hindustani classical music and composed musical pieces.

He was the elder brother of the legal reformer Prasanna Kumar Tagore. Hara Kumar died in 1858 and was succeeded as head of the Pathuriaghata branch by his eldest son, Jatindramohan Tagore. His other two sons were Sourindra Mohun Tagore and Shoutindramohan Tagore.

== Literary Works ==
- Haratattva-didhiti (1881)
- Purashcharana-bodhini (1895)
- Shila-chakrarthabodhini

== Legacy and Contributions ==
In memory of their father, Hara Kumar and his brother Prasanna Kumar constructed the Shyamnagar Mulajore Kali Bari along the Hooghly River. He also provided financial support for traditional Sanskrit learning institutions, religious scholarship, and the arts.

He commissioned the construction of a large residential estate in North Calcutta known as the Emerald Bower, which featured extensive grounds and combined architectural styles of the period. Decades later, the property was acquired by the Government of West Bengal and repurposed to serve as a campus for Rabindra Bharati University.

A public square in Kolkata, Hara Kumar Tagore Square, was named in his honor.
