= Gopi Mohan Tagore =

Zamindar and Philanthropist

Raja Gopi Mohan Tagore
- গোপী মোহন ঠাকুর
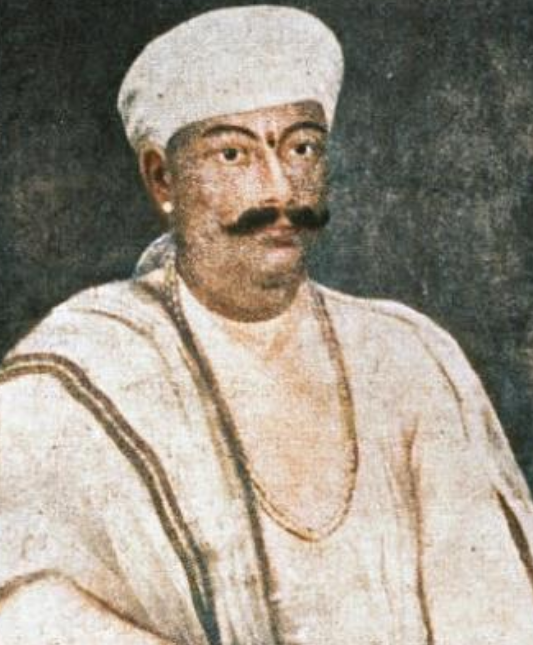
- CS Portrait of Gopi Mohan Tagore c.1917
- Born: 1760; Bengal Subah (today Kolkata, India)
- Died: 16 September 1819 (aged 58–59); Calcutta, Bengal, British India
- Occupation: −Landowner −Philanthropist
- Predecessor: Darpanarayan Tagore
- Successor: Hara Kumar Tagore
- Spouse(s): Rukmani Tagore (1st wife); Sarla Tagore (2nd wife)
- Father: Darpanarayan Tagore
- Relatives: Hara Kumar and Prasanna Kumar Tagore (sons); Jatindramohan, Sourindra Mohan, Shoutindra Mohan, and Gnanendra Mohan Tagore (grandchildren)
- Family: Tagore family

Raja Gopi Mohan Tagore (1760–1819) was a scion of the Pathuriaghata Tagore family and noted zamindar and philanthropist from Bengal region of the Indian subcontinent.

== Life and works ==
He was son of Darpanarayan Tagore, who branched and founded Pathuriaghata branch of Tagore family. He knew Sanskrit, French, Portuguese, English, Persian and Urdu languages. Gopi Mohan Tagore was well known for his wealth and in 1812, made what may be the largest ever gift of gold to the Kali temple at Kalighat. He was one of the founders of Presidency College, Kolkata, the institution that initiated western education in the country. He was fluent in English, and familiar with French, Portuguese, Sanskrit, Persian and Urdu, apart from Bengali. His donation for founding of Presidency College later known as Hindu College was second largest, next only to Maharaja of Burdwan and a marble tablet was erected of him in Library Hall of College to commemorate it. He was later appointed Governor of Hindu College and instituted a scholarship in his name for the eligible students.

Gopi Mohan celebrated Durga Puja with grandeur and many Europeans including General Wellesley attended the festival and dinner hosted by him.

He was a great patron of art, music, Sanskrit learning and athletic sports and used to donate generously for this purpose. The famous wrestler, Radha Gowla, was in his pay role. Among others in his pensioners were Lakhi Kanta, the noted Bengali lyricist and Kali Mirza, the noted singer of that time.

He was a close friend of Raja Raj Krishna Deb of Sovabazar Raj. He once assisted the father of Raja Baroda Kanta Roy of Jessore.

He had begun the Tagore family's art collection with the assistance of the British artist George Chinnery, who had visited Calcutta in 1803., which was later expanded by his great-grandson, Prodyot Coomar Tagore. He was the founder of Shyamnagar Mulajore Kali Temple at Shyamnagar. He founded it in mid May 1802.

He had six sons and a daughter. Surjo Kumar, Chandra Kumar, Nanda Kumar, Kali Kumar, Hara Kumar and Prassana Kumar., of which Hara Kumar Tagore and Prasanna Kumar Tagore both of whom carried forward legacy of Tagore family, were noted.
