= Darpanarayan Tagore =

- Born: 1731; Calcutta, Bengal Presidency, British India
- Died: 1793 (aged 61–62); Rajshahi, Bengal Presidency, British India
- Successor: Gopi Mohan Tagore
- Children: Gopi Mohan Tagore (son)
- Relatives: Hara Kumar Tagore (grandchild)
- Family: Tagore family

Darpanarayan Tagore (1731–1793) was a member of the Tagore family, who branched to Pathuriaghata. He worked as dewan to the French East India Company at Chandannagar before moving to Calcutta. He later became a merchant to Edward Wheeler, who succeeded Colonel Monson as a member of the Supreme Council of Bengal headed by Warren Hastings. He later purchased a large zamindari estate in his name at Rajshahi and established himself as one of the leading zamindars in Bengal. He was succeeded by his son Gopi Mohan Tagore.

== Legacy ==
Today, there is a street named after him called Darpanarayan Tagore Street. It spans approximately 0.25 kilometers and is situated in the historic Pathuriaghata neighborhood in North Kolkata, between Maharashi Debendra Road and Jadulal Mullick Road—an area closely associated with the Tagore family.

== See also ==
- Nilmoni Tagore – Darpanarayan's brother
