= Tagora =

Tagora may refer to:

- Eupterote or Tagora, a genus of moth
- Talbot Tagora, an executive car produced 1980–1983
- Tagora, a fictional planet in the Noon Universe

== See also ==
- Tagore (disambiguation)
- Thagora, an ancient town and Catholic titular see in Algeria
