= Rabindranath Tagore University =

Rabindranath Tagore University may refer to these universities in India named after Rabindranath Tagore:

- Rabindranath Tagore University, Bhopal in Madhya Pradesh
- Rabindranath Tagore University, Hojai in Assam
- Rabindranath Tagore University, Dhaniakhali in West Bengal

== See also ==
- Tagore (disambiguation)
