= Jatindramohan Tagore =

Bengali philanthropist (1831-1908)

Maharaja Bahadur Jatindramohan Tagore KCSI
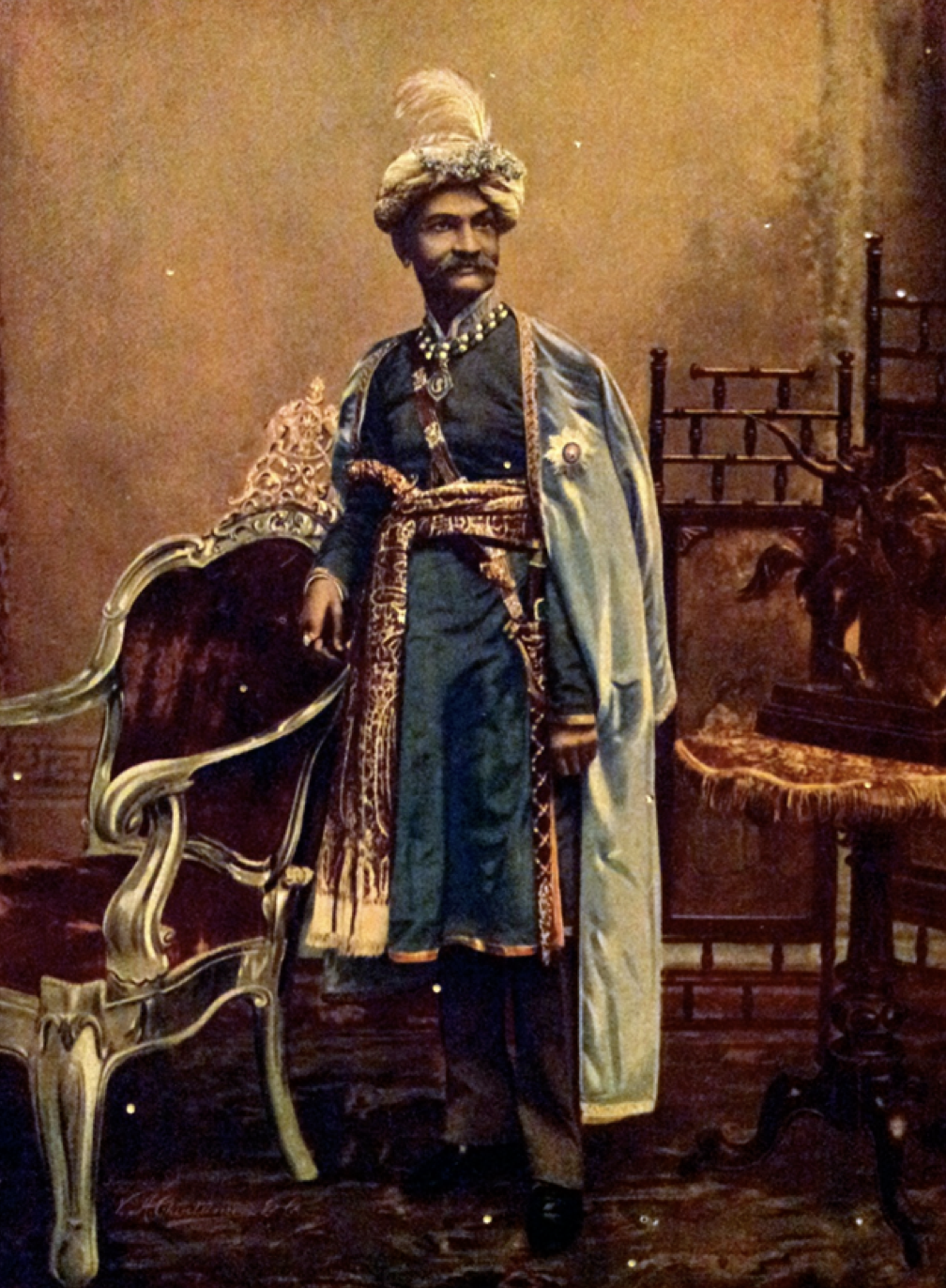
- Maharaja Jatindramohan Tagore, c. 1907
- Born: 16 May 1831; Calcutta, Bengal Presidency, British India (now Kolkata, India)
- Died: 10 January 1908 (aged 76); Calcutta, Bengal Presidency, British India
- Predecessor: Hara Kumar Tagore
- Successor: Prodyot Coomar Tagore

Maharaja Bahadur Sir Jatindramohan Tagore KCSI (16 May 1831 – 10 January 1908) was a theatre enthusiast, art-lover, and philanthropist from Bengal region of the Indian subcontinent.

== Early life ==
The son of Hara Kumar Tagore (1798 – 1858) and grandson of Gopi Mohan Tagore, he belonged to the Pathuriaghata branch of the Tagore family. Tagore completed his studies at Hindu College, and thereafter, read English and Sanskrit at home. He also received private tuition from Captain D.L. Richardson and others. His father, Hara Kumar Tagore, was also a learned scholar in the Hindu scriptures, Sanskrit and English. He had compiled critically admired books and assisted Radhakanta Deb (1783 – 1867) in compiling Sabdakalpadrum.

From an early age, Tagore displayed exceptional literary taste for composition both in English and in Bengali, having written several dramas and farces. One of these works was the Vidya Sundar Nataka, which when performed at his residence, received critical acclaim.

When Gnanendramohan Tagore, son of his uncle, Prasanna Coomar Tagore, converted to Christianity in 1851 and was deprived of inheritance for that reason, he inherited the vast property of his uncle.

== Public life ==
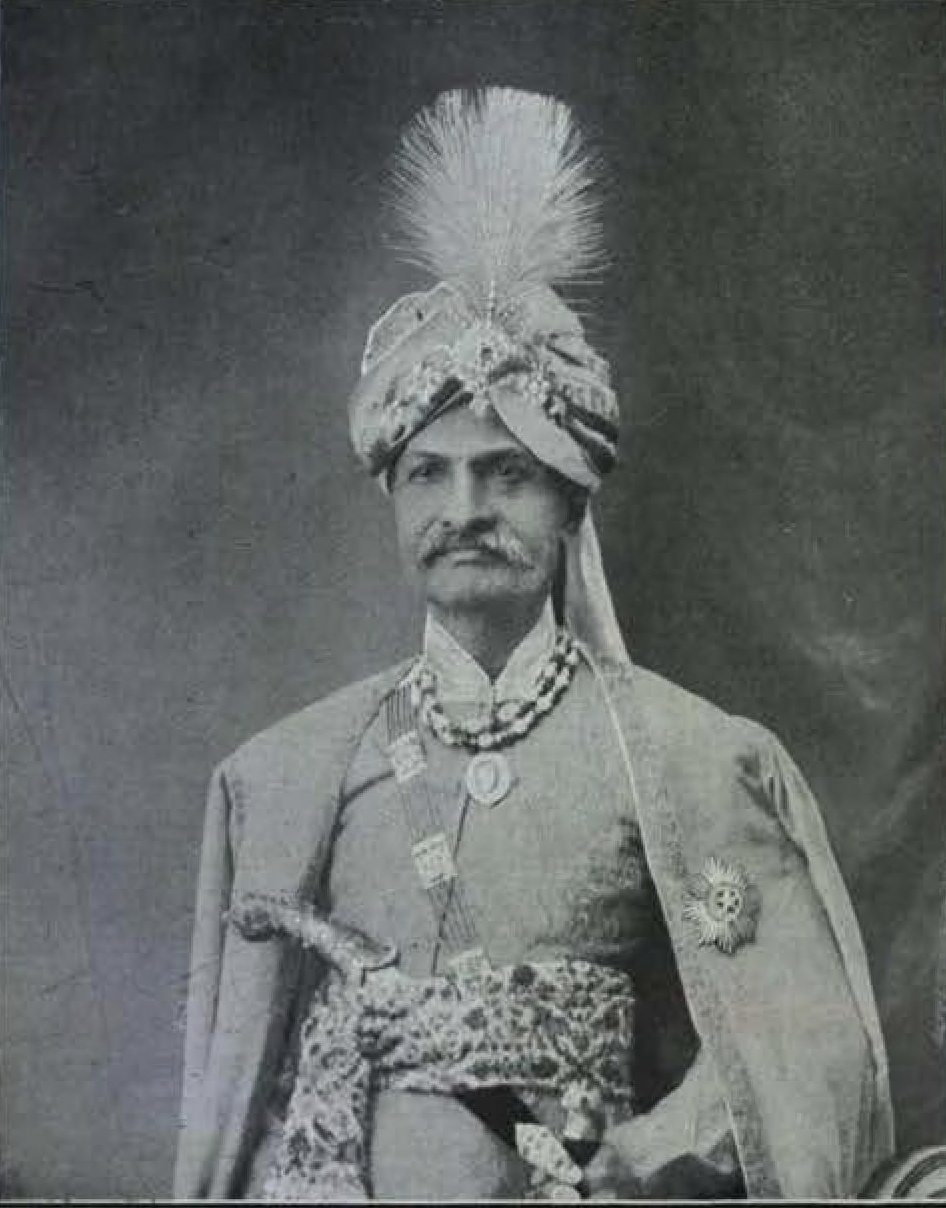
c. 1907

In 1866, Tagore lent help to the ruling administration, donating towards the benefit of famine-stricken farmers in Midnapur. He was Honorary Secretary of the British Indian Association for several years; was elected as its president in 1879; re-elected in 1881. In 1870 he was chosen as a Member of the Legislative Council of Bengal, and reappointed in 1872. In 1871 he received the title of 'Raja Bahadur', and was exempted from attendance in Civil Courts in April of that year. He received the title of Maharaja in 1877, on the occasion of the proclamation of Queen Victoria as Empress of India. He was appointed as a Member of the Legislative Council of the Governor-General in February of that year, and in recognition of his assistance towards the Civil Procedure Bill, was reappointed in 1879. In the latter year, he was created a Companion of the Most Exalted Order of the Star of India; and appointed for a third time, a Member of the Viceroy's Council in 1881. Created Knight Commander of the Star of India in May 1882; he received the title of Maharaja-Bahadur in January, 1890, and in January of the following year, this title was made hereditary in his family.

Tagore contributed extensively towards the establishment of the Mayo Hospital, resulting in one of the wards being named after him. He also established several scholarships for students of literature, science, culture and history in the names of his father and his uncle, Prasanna Coomar Tagore. He set apart funds for the provision of a gold keyur or armlet, to be annually presented to the best student in Sanskrit literature in Calcutta University; and founded a gold medal for the best student who passed an examination after attending the Tagore Law Lectures, annually, and another gold medal for the best student in physical science. He was appointed as a Justice of the Peace for the town of Calcutta, Fellow of the University of Calcutta, Trustee of the Indian Museum (of which he was elected president in the year 1882), one of the Governors of the Mayo Hospital, and a Member of the Asiatic Society. He had the honour of being elected the President of the Reception Committee during the visit of Prince Albert Victor in 1889. He was Vice President of the Syndicate of the Calcutta University in 1881, and President of the Faculty of Arts in 1881–82. He presented to the Calcutta University the marble statue of his uncle, the Hon. Prasanna Kumar Tagore, which is placed in the portico of the Senate House. Jointly with his brother, the Raja Sir Sourindro Mohun Tagore, he presented a piece of land to the Municipality of Calcutta for the construction of a Square (to be named after his father), in which at his own expense, he placed a marble bust of his father. He also founded an endowment for the benefit of Hindu widows, of one lakh of rupees, under the name of the "Maharajmata Shib Sundari Debi's Hindu Widows' Fund."

The visit of the eighteenth President of the United States of America, General Ulysses S. Grant to Calcutta specifically significant as it was a momentous event in the United Kingdom-United States of America relations of the late nineteenth century. In the papers of Ulysses S. Grant, recently made public, there is a reference to him being entertained at the Tagore household by Sourindro Mohun and his elder brother, Jatindra Mohun – "On March 14, 1879, USG (Ulysses S. Grant) met Garth at the Bengal High Court and participated in graduation ceremonies at Calcutta University. USG later attended a party given by the influential Tagore family and praised the traditional entertainment." This entertainment included a number of traditional performances as The Statesman and Friend of India described the occasion: "The house, grounds, and lakes were illuminated, and the effect was exceedingly beautiful. The entertainment of the evening consisted of Hindu Music, nautches, and other performances which we are sorry to say, completely beggar our descriptive powers. General Grant said it was the best entertainment of an Oriental character that he had ever witnessed." Similarly, The Indian Mirror reported that: "The Party … were treated to a variety of Hindu Music, consisting of different specimens of songs, performances on the Surbahar, Setar, Jaltaranga, Nyastaranga, Kathakata, Panchali, Rasdhari, Jattra, Bengali Jattra, Nautch, Boat-song (in the lake), and the Nagar-Kirtun, with all the paraphernalia which usually accompany the procession of the Vaisnavas."

His adopted son and heir was the Maharaj Kumar Prodyot Coomar Tagore; He had four daughters born out of wedlock.

== Legacy ==
Jatindra Mohan Avenue, the northern extension of Central Avenue is named in Jatindra Mohan Tagore's honour.
