= Tagore (disambiguation) =

Rabindranath Tagore (1861–1941) was a Bengali poet, writer, composer, philosopher, social reformer and painter.

Tagore may also refer to:

- Tagore family, a prominent Indian family
- Tagore (name), including a list of people with the name
- Tagore (film), a 2003 Indian film
- Tagore Garden metro station, of the Delhi Metro in Delhi, India

== See also ==
- Rabindranath Tagore University (disambiguation)
- Ravindranath, an Indian masculine given name
- Tagora (disambiguation)
- Thakur (disambiguation), alternate transliteration of Tagore
