= Thakura =

Thakura may refer to:

== People with the surname ==
- Bhaktisiddhanta Sarasvati Thakura, (1874–1937), preacher of Gaudiya Vaishnavism throughout India
- Radhamohana Thakura (1697–1778), Vaishnava guru
- Srivasa Thakura, close associate of Chaitanya Mahaprabhu and a member of the Pancha Tattva
- Vrindavana Dasa Thakura (1507–1589), author of the Chaitanya Bhagavata, the biography of Chaitanya Mahaprabhu in the Bengali language

== Other uses ==
- Thakur (title), a feudal title of the Indian subcontinent

== See also ==
- Thakur (disambiguation)
- Thakurai, a Muslim Rajput community in Bihar, India
