= Prodyot Coomar Tagore =

Indian maharaja (1873–1942)

Maharaja Bahadur Prodyot Coomar Tagore KCIE
- Born: 17 September 1873; Calcutta, Bengal Presidency, British India (now Kolkata, India)
- Died: 28 August 1942 (aged 68); Benares, United Provinces, British India (now Varansi, India)
- Predecessor: Jatindramohan Tagore
- Father: Sourindra Mohan Tagore

Maharaja Bahadur Sir Prodyot Coomar Tagore KCIE (17 September 1873 – 28 August 1942) was a leading land owner, philanthropist, art collector, and photographer in Kolkata, India. He belonged to the Pathuriaghata branch of the Tagore family.

Prodyot Coomar was the eldest son and heir of Sir Jatindramohan Tagore (1831–1908), who had been honoured with the hereditary title of Maharaja Bahadur in 1891. Like Jatindramohun himself, Prodyot Coomar was adopted. His biological father was Sourindra Mohan Tagore (1840–1915), who was Jatindramohun's brother. Prodyot Coomar's natural and adoptive fathers were men of "learning, taste and enlightenment". Sourindra Mohan was a distinguished musician and musical scholar.

== Art and photography ==
Gopi Mohan Tagore, Prodyot Coomar's great-grandfather, had begun the Tagore family's art collection with the assistance of the British artist George Chinnery, who had visited Calcutta in 1803. Prodyot Coomar greatly expanded the collection, and at his death it was the largest collection of European art in India. Works by Van Dyck, Rubens, Constable, Veronese and Murillo as well as British painters who were active in Calcutta in the eighteenth and nineteenth centuries, such as Jacomb-Hood, Chinnery and Thomas Daniell, covered the walls of the Tagore palaces. In later life, Prodyot Coomar donated extensive collections of Company Paintings to the fledgling collection of the Victoria Memorial Hall in Kolkata. When the Tagore collection was finally dispersed in the 1950s, a number of pictures and drawings were acquired by the institution for its permanent collection.

In addition to being a collector, Prodyot Coomar was an active patron and artist himself. He was a keen photographer, and in 1898 was the first Indian to be elected a fellow of the British Royal Photographic Society. He maintained a studio in his Tagore Castle residence, and exhibited in Kolkata. He was the founder and President of the Academy of Fine Arts, Calcutta, a trustee and Chairman of the Indian Museum and a fellow of the Royal Asiatic Society.

== Public life ==
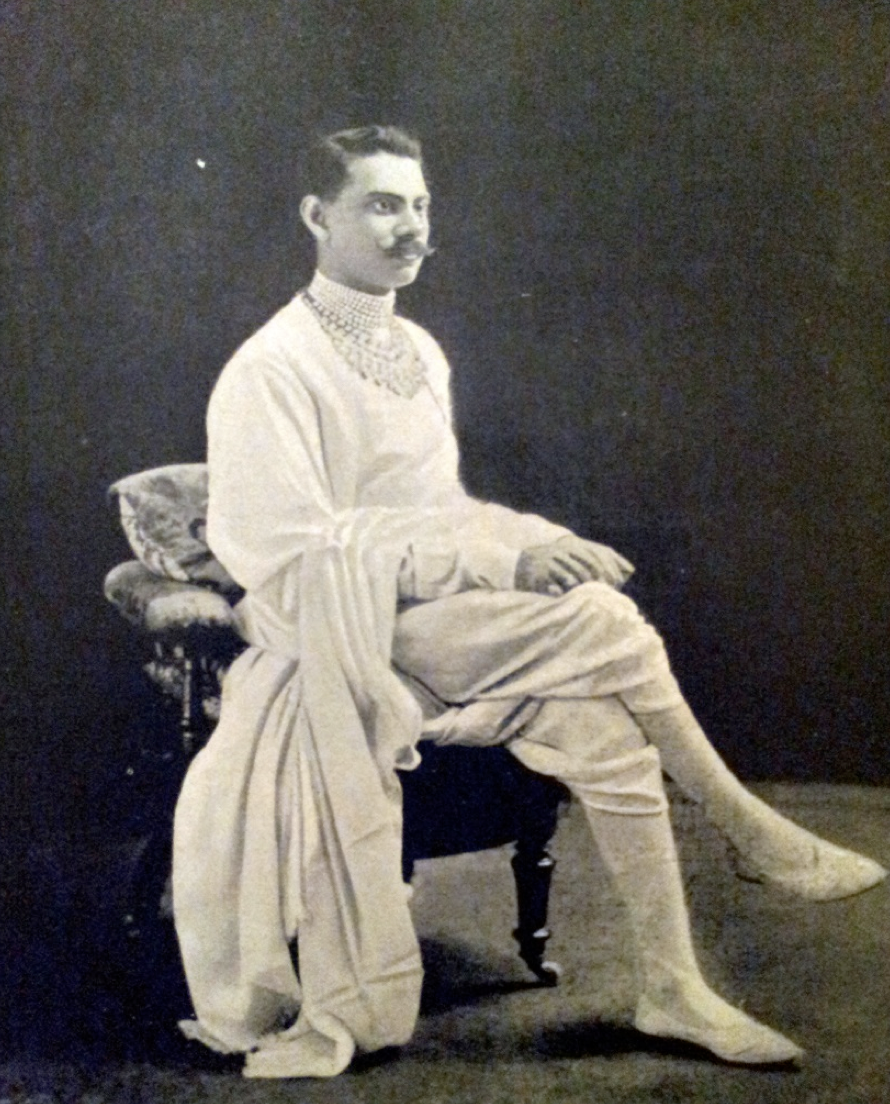
c.1905

The Maharaja was active in public life. He was a Commissioner of the Corporation of Calcutta, a Governor of the Mayo Hospital, and a member of the Bengal Legislative Council. From 1899 to 1911, he was the Secretary of the British Indian Association, an organization of wealthy landowners which represented their own and Indian interests in general to the British administration.

Prodyot Coomar Tagore represented the city of Calcutta at the coronation of Edward VII in 1902, one of fifteen "Indian Representatives of British Indian Provinces" to be present at the coronation in Westminster Abbey. When George V visited India in 1905, Tagore was the Secretary of the Imperial Reception Committee. During the King's stop in Kolkata, he gave a "lavish and extensive entertainment" on the maidan for him. He was knighted in May 1906 by the Prince of Wales (later George V), and was appointed a Knight Commander of the Order of the Indian Empire (KCIE) in the 1936 Birthday Honours.

The Tagores built a number of extravagant palaces in Kolkata and elsewhere. Prodyot Coomar Tagore divided his time between Tagore Castle, a fanciful imitation of European castles; The Prasad nearby, now used by the United Nations; and Emerald Bower, a country estate now part of Rabindra Bharati University.

Prodyot Coomar Tagore died on 28 August 1942 in Varanasi.
