= Thakur =

Thakur may refer to:

- Thakur (title), a feudal title and surname used by erstwhile Rajput nobility of India
- Thakur village, a residential locality in Mumbai, India
- Thakur Baldev Singh (Sholay) or Thakur, a fictional character played by Sanjeev Kumar in the 1975 classic Indian film Sholay

== See also ==
- Thaker, an Indian family name
- Thakkar, an Indian family name
- Thakar (tribe), an Adivasi tribe of Maharashtra, India
- Thakor, a Hindu Koli caste in Gujarat
- Thakura (disambiguation)
- Tagore (disambiguation)
