= Rabindranath Tagore University, Dhaniakhali =

Proposed private university in West Bengal, India

Rabindranath Tagore University
- Type: Proposed private university
- Established: 2024
- Location: Dhaniakhali, West Bengal, India
- Campus: Dhaniakhali
- Language: English

Rabindranath Tagore University is a proposed private university in Dhaniakhali, Hooghly district, West Bengal, India. The West Bengal Legislative Assembly approved the legislation in December 2024. The university is to be established under the Rabindranath Tagore University Act, 2024. The university was proposed as part of the state's higher education expansion plans.
