= Tagore Law Lectures =

The Tagore Law Lectures are an annual lecture series organised and hosted by the University of Calcutta, in India. The series is named after Prasanna Kumar Tagore, an Indian lawyer and politician, who left an endowment for the series in 1868. The first lecture in the series was delivered by Herbert Cowell, in 1870, on Hindu law as administered in British courts in India.

== History and Endowment ==
The Tagore Law Lecture series was funded in 1868 by Prasanna Kumar Tagore, an Indian lawyer and politician. In 1868, Tagore provided by his will that a law professor, to be known as the 'Tagore Law Professor' was to be appointed by the Senate of the University of Calcutta, and that this Professor's duties would be to:

"...read or deliver, yearly at some place within the town of Calcutta, one complete course of Law Lectures, without charge to the students and other persons who may attend such Lectures."

Tagore's will further provided for the publication of a minimum of 500 copies of these lectures, to be distributed for free. In his inaugural lecture, Herbert Cowell noted that the intention of this bequest was apparently to encourage the preparation and publication of textbooks on Indian law. The Tagore Law Lectures were delivered by leading Indian, British, and American scholars and jurists, including Rash Behari Ghose, Gooroodas Banerjee, Sir Frederick Pollock, Roscoe Pound, and John Woodroffe, and former U.S. Supreme Court judge, William O'Douglas. H.M. Seervai, the Indian lawyer and constitutional law scholar, was also invited to deliver lectures for the series, but declined on the grounds that his professional commitments would not allow him to develop lectures that fit the series' standards of legal research.

In 2020, the Calcutta University published the Tagore Law Lectures delivered between 1868 and 1986 on their library website, making them publicly accessible, as part of an initiative to digitise records and rare documents.

== Legacy ==
Scholar and lawyer Rajeev Dhavan has described the Tagore Lecture Series as the 'most celebrated' of Indian endowed lectures on law, noting that the research produced for these lectures represents a 'black-letter' tradition, aimed at documenting the law and not critically assessing it. This assessment is echoed by e Rajkumari Agrawala, who has critiqued the series for its focus on a formalistic approach to law, and noted a lack of theoretical appreciation in the lectures delivered under this endowment.

The Tagore Law Lectures have been often cited by courts in India as references for the interpretation of Indian laws. The Privy Council in 1941 relied on Upendra Nath Mitra's Tagore Law Lecture in 1932, concerning the law of limitation. The Indian Supreme Court has relied on multiple Tagore Law Lectures including William O' Douglas's 1939 Lecture on comparative U.S. and Indian law, Julius Jolly's 1883 lecture on the Hindu law of partition, inheritance, and adoption and M.C. Setalvad's 1974 lecture on the relation between the Union and States in the Indian Constitution.

== List of Lectures ==
A list of the Tagore Law Lectures that have been delivered is below.

| Year | Lecturer | Title |
|---|---|---|
| 1870 | Herbert Cowell | The Hindu Law: Being a Treatise on Law Administered Exclusively to the Hindus by the British Courts in India I |
| 1871 | Herbert Cowell | The Hindu Law: Being a Treatise on Law Administered Exclusively to the Hindus by the British Courts in India II |
| 1872 | Herbert Cowell | The History and Constitution of the Courts and Legislative Authorities in India |
| 1873 | Shama Churun Sarkar | The Muhammedan Law: Being a Digest of the Law Applicable Especially to the Sunnis in India |
| 1874 | Arthur Phillips | The Law Relating to the Land Tenures of Lower Bengal 1874-75 |
| 1875 | Rash Behari Ghosh | The Law of Mortgage in India |
| 1877 | Ernest John Trevelyan | The Law Relating to Minors in the Presidency of Bengal |
| 1878 | Gooroodas Banerjee | The Hindu Law of Marriage and Stridhan |
| 1879 | Trailokyanath Mitra | The Law Relating to the Hindu Widow |
| 1880 | Rajkumar Sarvadhikari | The Principles of the Hindu Law of Inheritance |
| 1881 | William Fischer Agnew | The Law of Trusts in British India |
| 1882 | Upendra Nath Mitra | The Law of Limitation and Prescription (in British India) including Easements |
| 1883 | Julius Jolly | The Hindu Law of Partition, Inheritance and Adoption |
| 1884 | Syed Ameer Ali | The Law Relating to Gifts, Trusts, and Testamentary Dispositions Among the Mahomedans |
| 1885 | K. K. Bhattacharya | The Law Relating to the Joint Hindu Family |
| 1886 | K. M Chatterjea | The Law Relating to the Transfer of Immovable Property |
| 1887 | G.S. Henderson | The Law of Testamentary Devise as Administered in India or the Law Relating to Wills in India |
| 1888 | Golapchandra Sarkar Sastri | The Hindu Law of Adoption |
| 1889 | T. A. Pearson | The Law of Agency in British India |
| 1890 | Lal Mohun Doss | The Law of Riparian Rights: Alluvion and Fishery |
| 1891 | Maulvi Mahomed Yusoof Khan Bahadur | Mahomedan Law Relating to Marriage, Dower, Divorce, Legitimacy, and the Guardianship of Minors |
| 1892 | Pandit Pran Nath Saraswati | The Hindu Law of Endowments |
| 1893 | Arthur Caspersz | Estoppel by Representation and Res Judicata in British India |
| 1894 | Sir Frederick Pollock | The Law of Fraud, Misrepresentation, and Mistake in India |
| 1895 | Saradchandra Mitra | The Land Law of Bengal (with Bihar and Orissa) |
| 1896 | Ram Charan Mitra | The Law of Joint Property and Partition in India |
| 1897 | John George Woodroffe | The Law Relating to Injunctions in British India |
| 1898 | Asutosh Mukhopadhyay | The Law of Perpetuities in British India |
| 1899 | Frederick Peacock | The Law Relating to British Easements in India |
| 1901 | K. Shelley Bonnerjee | The Interpretation Of Deeds Wills, And Statutes In British India |
| 1903 | Satya Ranjan Das | The Law Of Ultra Vires In British India |
| 1904 | Jogendra Chundra Ghosh | The Hindu Law Of Impartible Property Including Endowments |
| 1905 | Kisori Lal Sarkar | The Mimansa Rules Of Interpretation As Applied To Hindu Law |
| 1906 | Satish Chandra Banerji | The Law Of Specific Relief In British India |
| 1908 | Sripati Roy | Customs And Customary Law In British India |
| 1909 | Priyanath Sen | The General Principles Of Hindu Jurisprudence |
| 1910 | C. O. Remfry | Commercial Law In British India |
| 1912 | Bijoy Kisor Acharyya | Codification In British India |
| 1913 | Samatul Chandra Dutt | Compulsory Sales In British India |
| 1914 | Satish Chandra Bagchi | Principles Of The Law Of Corporations With Special Reference To British India |
| 1916 | Prosanto Kumar Sen | The Law Of Monopolies In British India |
| 1917 | K. P. Jayaswal | Manu And Yajnavalkya A Comparison And A Contrast : A Treatise On The Basic Hindu Law |
| 1918 | Nagendranath Ghose | Comparative Administrative Law |
| 1920 | K.Subramania Pillai | Principles Of Criminology |
| 1921 | S. P. Sen Gupta | Law Of Mortgage |
| 1922 | James Wilford Garner | Recent Developments In International Law |
| 1923 | Westel W. Willoughby | The Fundamental Concepts Of Public Law |
| 1924 | Satyaranjan Das | The Law Of Ultra Vires |
| 1925 | Radhabinod Pal | The History Of The Law Of Primogeniture With Special Reference To India Ancient And Modern |
| 1929 | Prosanto Kumar Sen | Penology Old And New |
| 1930 | Radhabinod Pal | The History Of Hindu Law In The Vedic Age And In Post-Vedic Times |
| 1931 | Arnold D. Macnair | The Law Of The Air |
| 1933 | James Mackintosh | Roman Law In Modern Practice |
| 1937 | Nalini Kumar Mukherjee | The Law Of Partnership With Special Reference To British India |
| 1937 - 38 | William Holdsworth | Some makers of English Law |
| 1938 | Radhabinod Pal | Crimes In International Relations, 1938, |
| 1939 | William O. Douglas | From Marshall To Mukherjea : Studies In American And Indian Constitutional Law |
| 1942 | Nripendra Nath Sircar | The Law Of Arbitration In British India |
| 1948 | Roscoe Pound | The Ideal Element In Law |
| 1950 | Nares Chandra Sen-Gupta | Evolution Of Ancient Indian Law |
| 1951 | P.B. Gajendragadkar | The Hindu Law Of Religious And Charitable Trusts |
| 1962 | J.R.Mudholkar | Press Law |
| 1963 | B.C.Mitra | The Law Of Carriage By Sea |
| 1972 | Durga Das Basu | Limited Government And Judicial Review |
| 1977 | Sir Zelman Cowen | Individual Liberty And The Law |
| 1983 | M. Hidayatullah | Right To Property And The Indian Constitution |
| 1986 | Imam Fakhruddin Hassan Bin Mansur Al-Uzjandi Al Farghani | Mahomedan Law Of Marriage, Dower, Divorce, Legitimacy And Guardianship Of Minors, According To The Sunnis |
