= Gaganendranath Tagore =

Indian painter and cartoonist of the Bengal school (1867–1938)

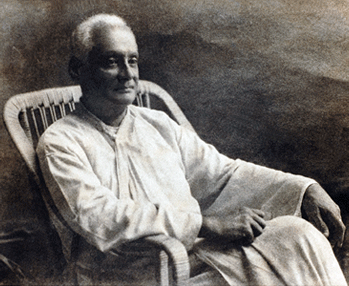
- Born: 17 September 1867; Calcutta, Bengal Presidency, British India
- Died: 14 February 1938 (aged 70); Calcutta, Bengal Presidency, British India
- Known for: Painting; cartoonist
- Movement: Bengal School of Art
- Children: Kanakendranath Tagore, Nabendranath Tagore, Gahendranath Tagore

Gaganendranath Tagore (18 September 1867 – 14 February 1938) was an Indian painter and cartoonist of the Bengal school. Along with his brother Abanindranath Tagore, he was counted as one of the earliest modern artists in India.

== Life and career ==
Gaganendranath Tagore was born at Jorasanko into the Tagore family, whose creative contributions defined Bengal's cultural history. Gaganendranath was the eldest son of Gunendranath Tagore, grandson of Girindranath Tagore and a great-grandson of Prince Dwarkanath Tagore. His brother Abanindranath was a pioneer and leading exponent of the Bengal School of Art. He was a nephew of the poet Rabindranath Tagore and the great-grandfather of actress Sharmila Tagore.

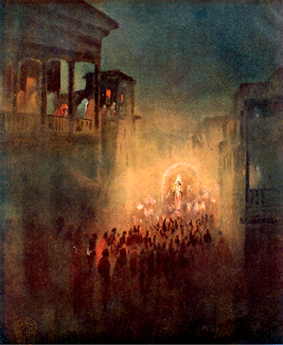
Pratima Visarjan, watercolour, c. 1915

Gaganendranath received no formal education but trained under the watercolourist Harinarayan Bandopadhyay. In 1907, along with his brother Abanindranath, he founded the Indian Society of Oriental Art which later published the influential journal Rupam. Between 1906 and 1910, the artist studied and assimilated Japanese brush techniques and the influence of Far Eastern art into his own work, as demonstrated by his illustrations for Rabindranath Tagore's autobiography Jeevansmriti (1912). He went on to develop his own approach in his Chaitanya and Pilgrim series. Gaganendranath eventually abandoned the revivalism of the Bengal School and took up caricature. The Modern Review published many of his cartoons in 1917. From 1917 onwards, his satirical lithographs appeared in a series of books, including Play of Opposites, Realm of the Absurd and Reform Screams.

Between 1920 and 1925, Gaganendranath pioneered experiments in modernist painting. Partha Mitter describes him as "the only Indian painter before the 1940s who made use of the language and syntax of Cubism in his painting". From 1925 onwards, the artist developed a complex post-cubist style.

Gaganendranath also took a keen interest in theatre, and wrote a children's book in the manner of Lewis Carroll, Bhodor Bahadur ('Otter the Great').

== Works ==
- Adbhut Lok: realm of the absurd, 1917, Calcutta: Vichitra Press, a portfolio of thirteen satirical pictures.
- Naba Hullod: Reform screams; a pictorial review at the close of the year 1921, 1921, Calcutta: Thacker, Spink & Co.
- Birupa bajra (Play of Opposites), 1930, Calcutta: Preonath Das Gupta for the Indian Publishing House.
- Bhondor bahadur, Kolkata: Shishu Sahitya Samsad, 1998, classic children's book

== Gallery ==
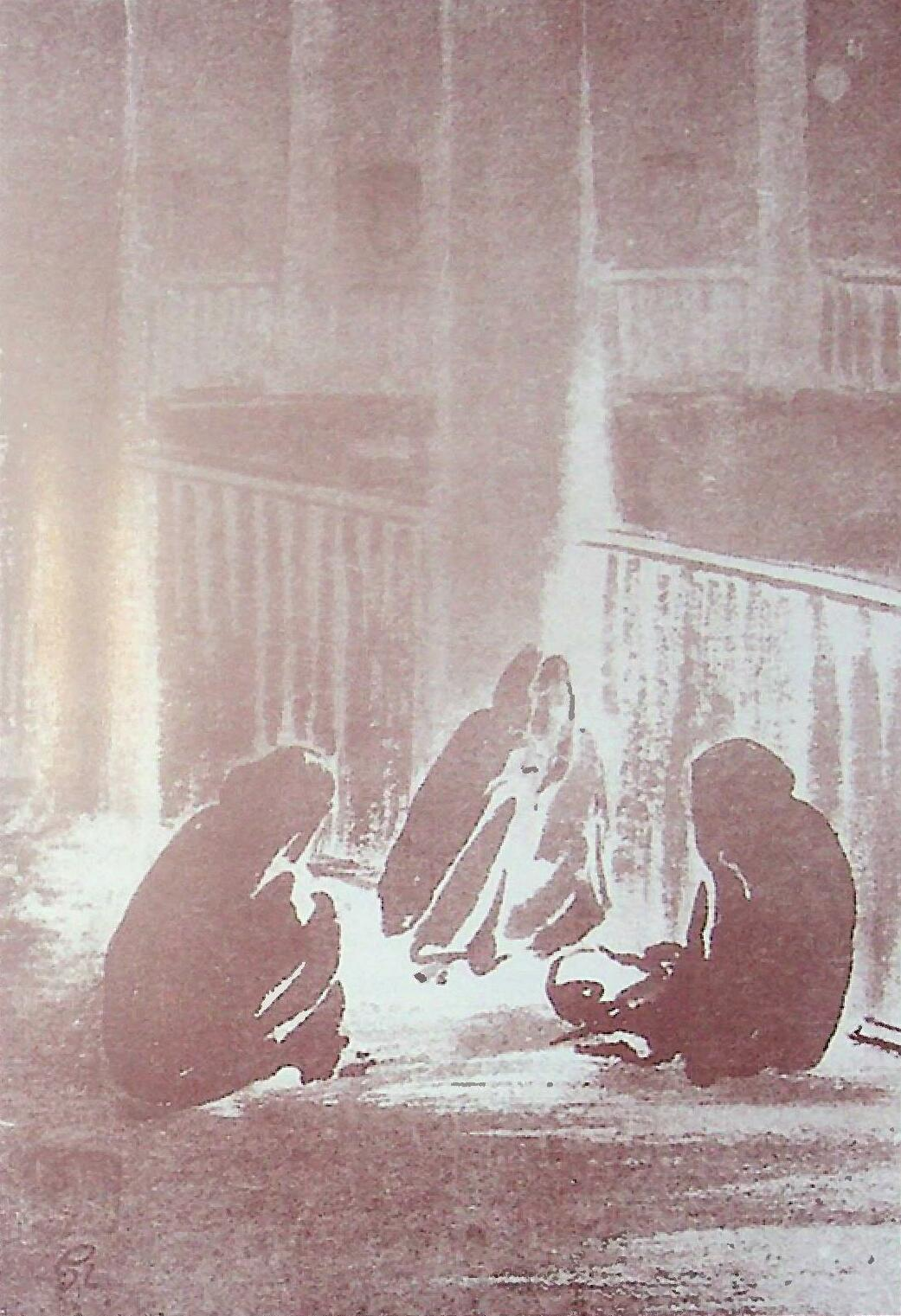
"In this patch of light the maids have gathered,... rolling cotton waste into lamp-wicks, and chatting in undertones of their village homes", illustration in Rabindranath Tagore's Jivan Smriti (জীবন-স্মৃতি, My Reminiscences), 1912

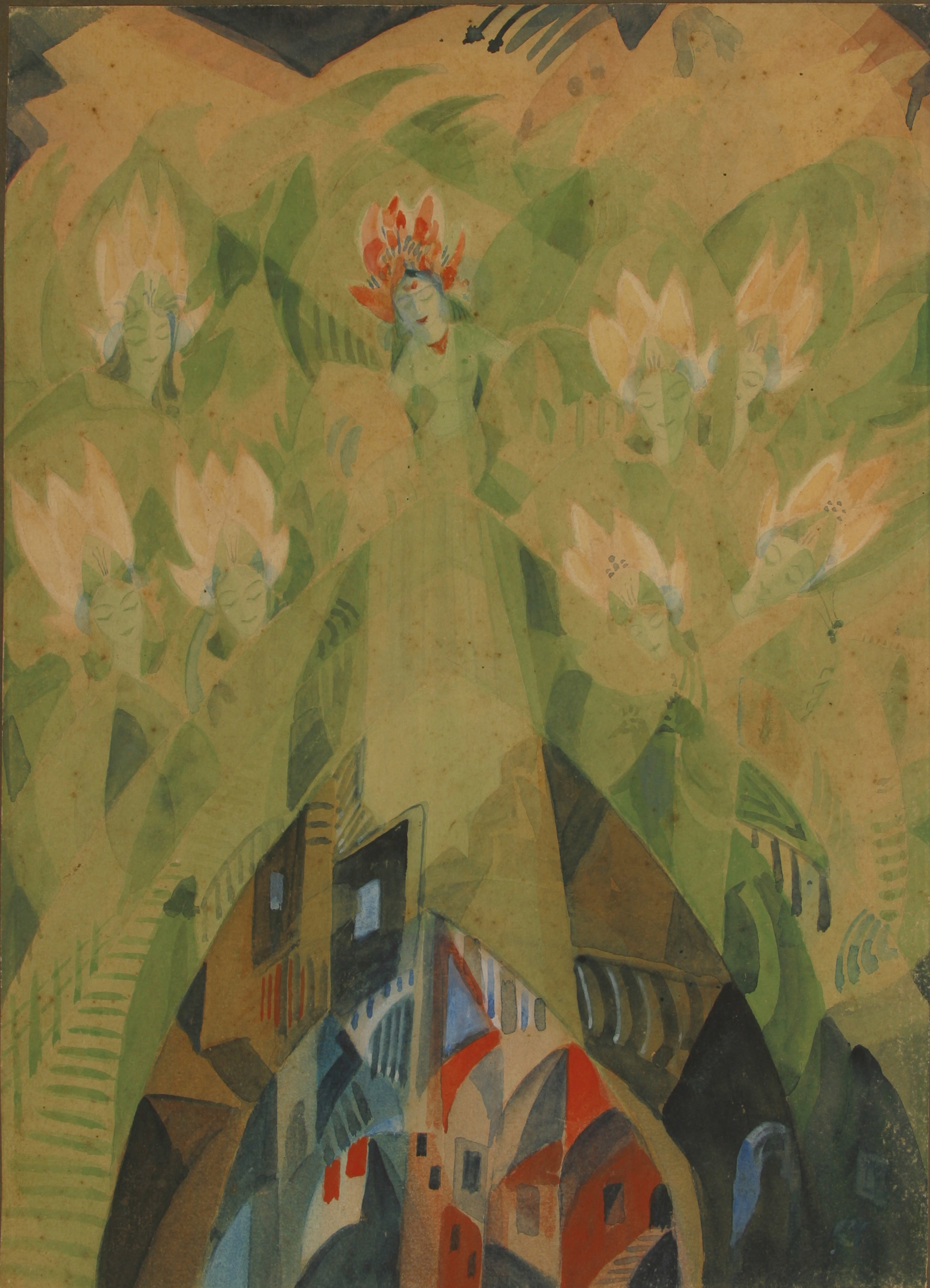
Sat-Bhai Champa. Watercolour, 34 × 25 cm, Victoria Memorial, Kolkata

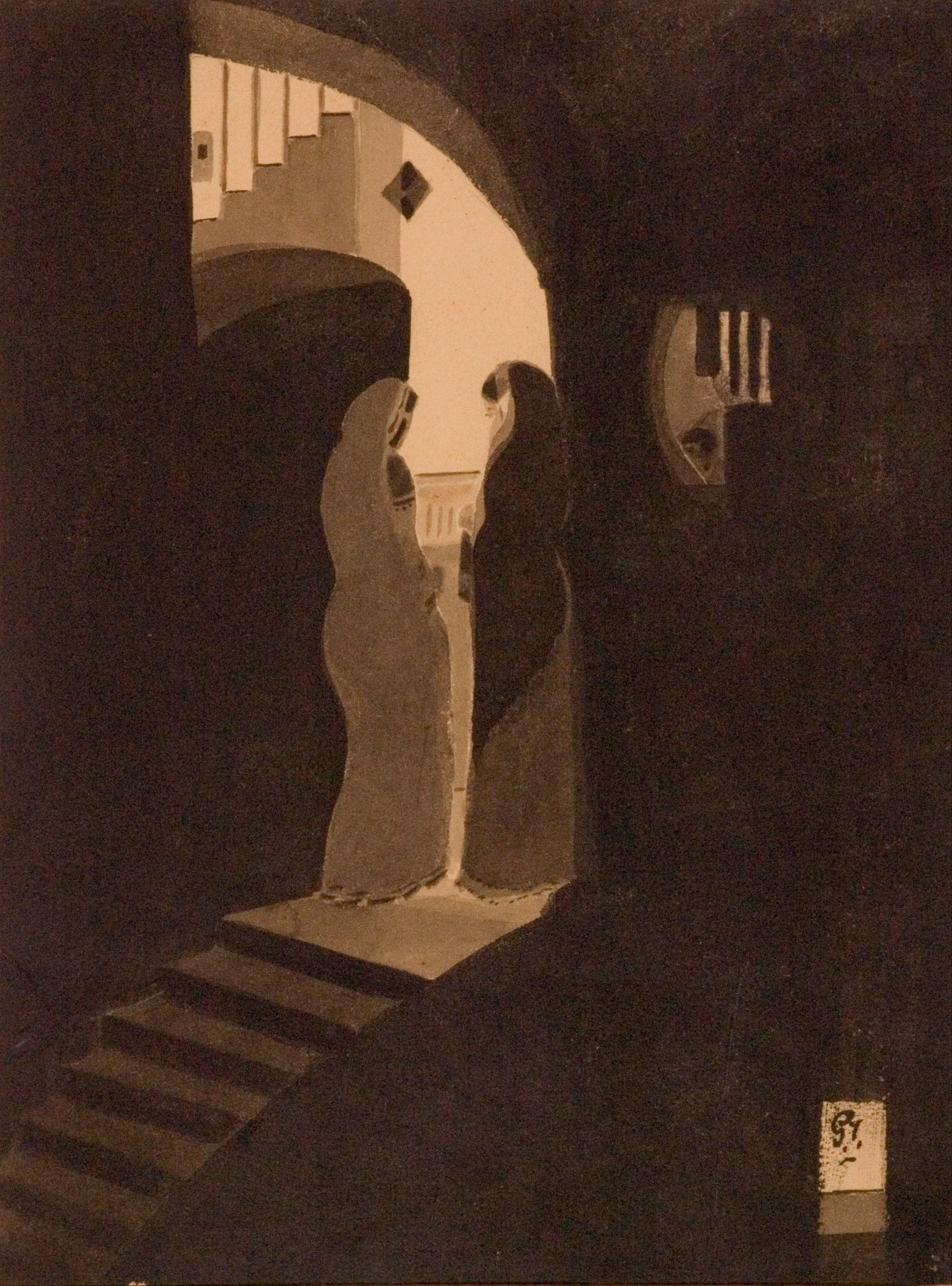
Meeting at the Staircase, c. 1920–1925

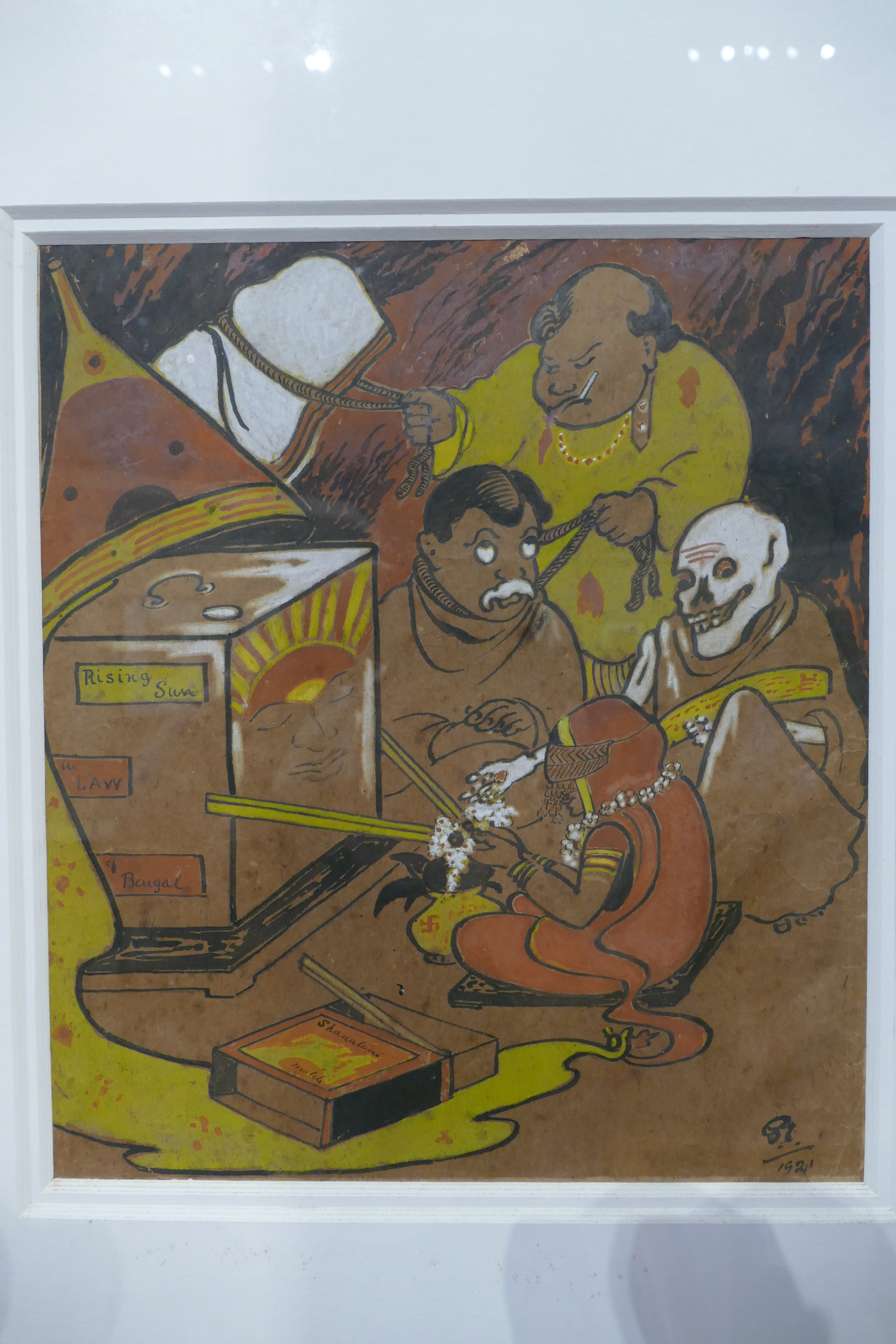
Rising Sun-in-law of Bengal, a criticism to bride burning. Indian Museum, Kolkata

== See also ==
- Tagore family
