= Nilmoni Tagore =

Judge in British India

- Born: 1721; Pathuriaghata, Calcutta, Bengal Subah (now Kolkata, India)
- Died: 1791 (aged 69–70); Calcutta, Bengal, British India
- Predecessor: Joyram Tagore
- Successor: Rammoni Tagore

Nilmoni Tagore (1721–1791) was a scion of Tagore family who, founded the Jorasanko branch of Tagore family leaving the old house of Pathuriaghata. In year 1758, he started to build what is now known as Jorasanko Thakur Bari. Nilmoni and Darpanarayan were two sons of Jairam Thakur, who was employed with British East India Company. While Darpanarayan developed his business and lands, Nilmoni chose to serve British and rose to the Serishtadarship of District Court. He received an amount of Rupees One lakh from his brother Darpanarayan, as a settlement amount of family dispute and shifted to Jorasanko and built house there.

He had three sons, Ramlochan Tagore (1759-1804), Rammoni Tagore (1759-1833) and Rambullav Tagore (1767-1824). Rammoni Tagore had three sons, Radhanath, Dwarkanath and Ramanath Tagore Ramlochan Tagore had no son, so he adopted the second son of his brother Rammoni, the legendary Dwarkanath Tagore, who was illustrious and under him the fortunes of Jorasanko branch of Tagore touched high.
