= Sourindra Mohun Tagore =

Bengali musicologist (1840–1914)

Sourindra Mohun Tagore CIE
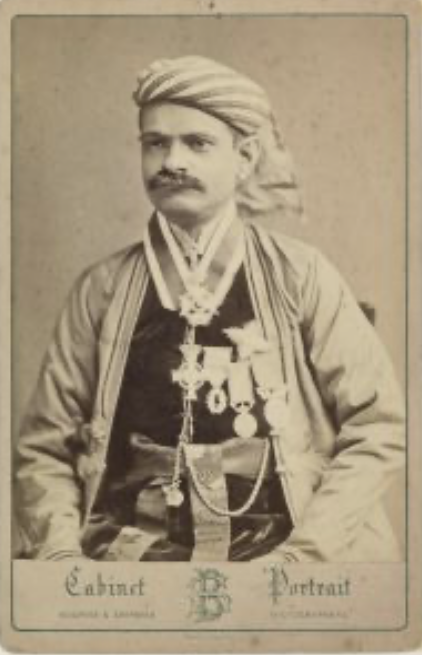
- Sourindra Mohun Tagore, c. 1875
- Born: 1840; Pathuriaghata, Bengal Presidency, British India
- Died: 5 June 1914 (aged 73–74); Calcutta, Bengal Presidency, British India

Raja Sir Sourindra Mohun Tagore or Sourindro Mohun Tagore CIE (1840, Pathuriaghata - 5 June 1914, Calcutta) was a Bengali musicologist who came from an upper-class family from Bengal region of the Indian subcontinent; that also later produced Rabindranath Tagore. He studied both Indian and western music theory and published extensively on the topics. He founded the Bengal Music School and Bengal Academy of Music. A staunch supporter of the British Empire and its agencies in India, he was commissioned to set Indian translations of God Save the Queen to Indian tunes.

== Biography ==
Sourindro was the son of Hara Kumar Tagore and a younger brother of Jotindro Mohun Tagore belonging to the Pathuriaghata branch of the Tagore family. His family owned extensive lands including the battleground of Plassey and the pilgrimage site Ganga Sagar. He studied at the European-model Hindu College in Calcutta and took an interest in music, both Indian and western. He published a book on music at the age of fifteen, developed a system of musical notation for Indian music and set up the first Indian music orchestra in Calcutta. He collected musical instruments from India and donated many to museums across the world. He received an honorary Doctorate of Music from Philadelphia (1875) and Oxford (1895).

== Music and writings ==
In 1877 the declaration of Queen Victoria as Empress of India led to the creation of the national anthem of "God Save the Queen". In 1882 a National Anthem Committee was created at the suggestion of Francis Harford. In 1883 he wrote On the Good That May Result to England and India from the Establishment of "God Save the Queen" as a National Anthem in Her Majesty's Eastern Empire. A translation of the wording of the anthem was made by Mirza Mohammed Bakir Khan of Bishop's College, Calcutta into Arabic and Persian. These were then further translated into many other Indian languages. The problem of singing the anthem in a style that would suit Indian musical taste was however vexing and the committee chose the foremost authority on Indian music to help- "a letter will immediately be forwarded to Dr. Sourindro Mohan Tagore, of Calcutta, the principal authority upon Hindu music, requesting him to secure the services of the best native composer, and a melody which shall at once suit Oriental taste and the measure of the translated hymn." The idea was supported by others like Sir Henry Rawlinson. Sourindra Mohun produced no less than twelve different variations of the anthem based on lum jhijhiti, behag and nagara kirtana styles. In one variant he chose rag sahana which he claimed was the "favourite melody of the Mahomedan Emperors of India." Tagore also claimed that Indians always supported rule by Kings and he published a book, Hindu Loyalty, with extracts from old Sanskrit sources on the need for rule by Kings. He dedicated the book to Augustus Rivers Thompson and supported the ideas of Canon Harford that the anthem would help earn loyalty. It has been noted that a major motivation for Sourindra Mohun to work with the National Anthem Committee was to align his family and social group with that of the colonial rulers. He also set some poems by Lord Lytton to Indian tunes in A Few Lyrics Of Owen Meredith Set to Hindu Music, with Added Words and Signs Noting the Two-Part Form of the Tune in Hindustani Music and a Tal Pattern. He also published on The Caste System of the Hindus (1884) and noted its antiquity and justified its role in Indian society.

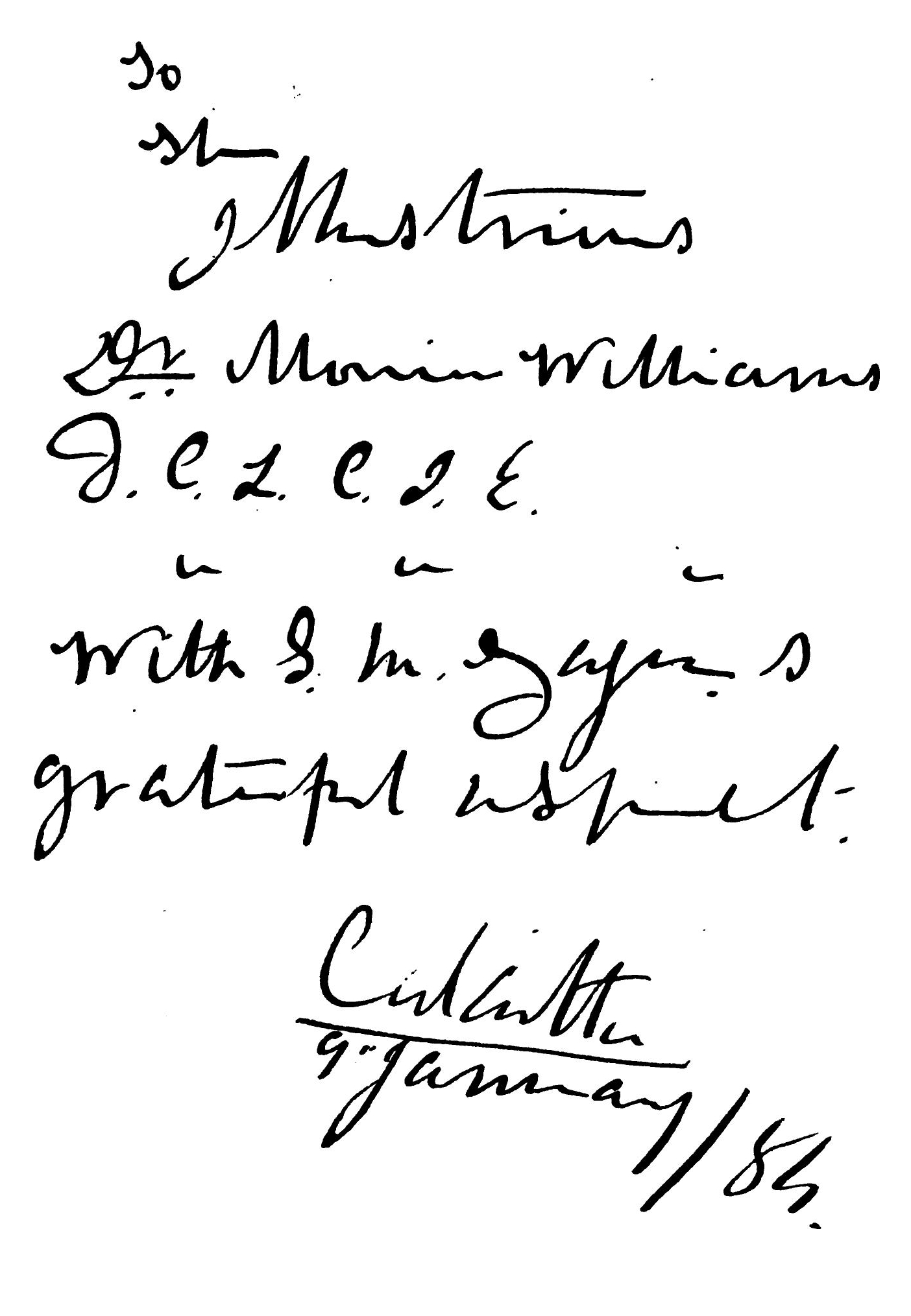
Signature on book gifted by Tagore to Monier Williams

Among Sourindra's published works was a translation of Kalidasa's Malavikagnimitra. He founded the Bengal Music School in 1871 and the Bengal Academy of Music in 1881. He was made Fellow of the University of Calcutta and a Companion of the Most Eminent Order of the Indian Empire in 1880 apart from being given the title of Raja. He was decorated Knight Commander of the Royal Order of the Crown of Italy and several other Royal recognitions from Sweden, Netherlands, Wurtemberg and Austria.

In 1877, he made an initiative to renew musical ties with Japan by sending three musical instruments to the Emperor Mutsuhito of the Meiji Era to help bring the musical traditions of two nations together.

In 1884, in order to promote the interest in and study of Indian music in other countries, he donated numerous collections of Indian instruments to institutions in North America and Europe including the Royal College of Music, London. Tagore worked to establish an annual award at the college, the Tagore Gold Medal, which is still given to "the most generally deserving pupil(s)".

He was awarded a knighthood by Queen Victoria in 1884.

== Foreign Honours ==
- Order of Prince Danilo I, Montenegro
- (British Raj) Companion of Order of the Indian Empire, British India
- (Kingdom of Italy) Knight Commander of the Royal Order of the Crown of Italy, Italy
- (Austrian Empire) Most Exalted Order of Francis Joseph, Austria
- (Kingdom of Saxony) Order of Albert, Saxony, First Class
- (Kingdom of Württemberg) Friedrich Order, Kingdom of Wurtemberg
- Order of Leopold, Belgium
- (Danish Realm) Order of Dannebrog, Denmark
- Royal Order of Vasa, Sweden
- (Kingdom of Nepal) Order of Gorkha Dakshina Bahu, Nepal
- Imperial Order of the Dragon of Annam, Annam
- Royal Order of Kapiolani, Hawaiian Kingdom
- (Portugal) Military Order of Christ, Portuguese Empire
- Order of the Netherlands Lion, Netherlands
- (Pahlavi Iran) Second Class of Order of the Lion and the Sun, Persia
- Grand Cordon of the Order of the Liberator, Venezuela
