= Tagore family =

Bengali family

Tagore family Thakur
- Zamindar
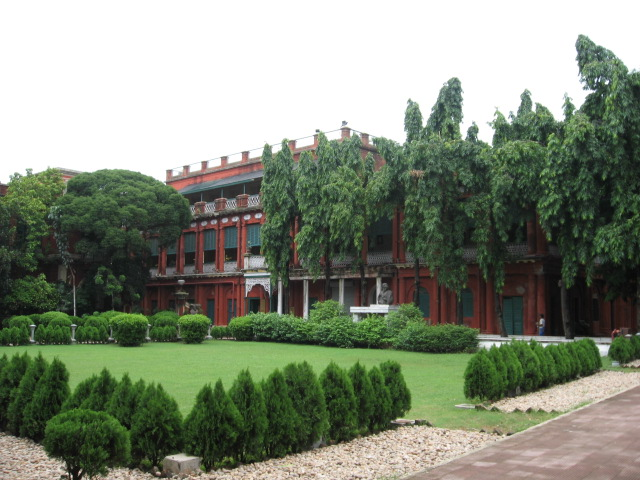
- Jorasanko Thakur Bari, the Zamindari seat of the Tagore family
- Parent family: Kushari; Shandilya (Claimed)
- Origin: Bardhaman, Bengal
- Founded: 17th century
- Founder: Jaganath Kushari
- Titles: Raja of Pathuriaghata
- Style: Raja
- Estate: Jorasanko Thakur Bari
- Cadet branches: Tagore-Pathuriaghata family branch Tagore-Jorasanko family branch Tagore-Koilaghata family branch Tagore-Chorbagan family branch

The Thakur family, anglicized as Tagore family (Note: Bengali: ঠাকুর পরিবার Ṭhakur poribar) was a prominent family from Bengal who were regarded as one of the consequential benefactors during the Bengali Renaissance. They were best known for their contribution substantially in the fields of business, social and religious reformation, literature, art, politics and music. The influence of Tagore family carried a significant amelioration in Bengali societies and is regarded as one of the reverenced families in modern day India and Bangladesh.

== Family history ==
The Tagore family traces its ancestral origins to the Kushari Brahmins of the Bardhaman region in present-day West Bengal. A branch of the family later settled at Pithabhog in the Jessore region (now in Khulna District, Bangladesh) before migrating to Govindapur in Calcutta during the eighteenth century.

They were Bengali Hindu Kushari Brahmin and originally belonged to a village named Kush in what is now in Bardhaman region, West Bengal. They were the descendants of Deen Kushari who was granted a village named Kush in Bardhaman of West Bengal by Maharaja Kshitisura. Deen became its chief and came to be known as Kushari. The Tagores came to Calcutta from Khulna and started various business enterprises. The name 'Tagore' is an anglicized version of the Bengali name 'Thakur' which means 'Teacher' or 'God', and denotes respect since they were of a Brahmin caste.

== Background ==
Tagores were Bengali Brahmins. However, Dwarkanath Tagore (grandfather of Rabindranath Tagore) was one of the founding members of the Brahmo Samaj (Brahmo religion) along with Raja Rammohun Roy. Europeans started coming to Bengal in the 16th century, resulting in the founding of Ugulim (Hooghly-Chinsura) by the Portuguese in 1579. The Bengal Renaissance of the 19th century was a remarkable period of societal transformation in which a whole range of creative activities – literary, cultural, social and economic – flourished. The Bengal Renaissance was the culmination of the process of emergence of the cultural characteristics of the Bengali Society. This spread over, covering around three centuries, and had a tremendous impact on Bengali society. The Tagore family attained prominence during this period through its unusual social positioning between Indian and European influences.

== The Pathuriaghata family ==
Among the family which settled in Pathuriaghata was that of Raja Gopi Mohan Tagore. He was a noted zamindar and philanthropist. His oldest son Hara Kumar Tagore was a Sanskrit scholar, writer and musician. Among Hara Kumar's children, Maharaja Sir Jatinodro Mohun Tagore and Sir Sourindro Mohun became famous.

== The Jorasanko family ==
=== The business base ===
Dwarakanath Tagore (1794–1846) was the son of Nilmoni Tagore's second son, Rammani Tagore, but was adopted by the childless first son, Ramlochan Tagore. He inherited the Jorasanko property and Ramlochan's vast wealth. Dwarakanath was involved in multifarious activities ranging from being an agent of Mackintosh & Co. to being a serestadar, collector and dewan in the 24 Parganas collectorate. However, it was his business prowess that brought him both wealth and fame. In partnership with William Carr, he established Carr, Tagore and Company, the first equal partnership between European and Indian businessmen and the initiator of the managing agency system in India.

=== Creative outpourings ===
Debendranath's third son, Hemendranath Tagore was a strict disciplinarian who was entrusted with the responsibility of looking after the education of his younger brothers as well as administering the large family estates. Like most of Debendranath's children, he had varied interests in different fields. On one hand, he composed a number of "Bromhosangeets" and on the other, wrote articles on physical science which he planned to compile and edit into a textbook for school students. He was known for his physical strength and wrestling skills. Exceptionally for the times, he insisted on formal education for his daughters. He not only put them through school but trained them in music, arts and European languages such as French and German. It was another mark of his forward thinking that he actively sought out eligible grooms from different provinces of India for his daughters and married them off in places as far away as Uttar Pradesh and Assam.

Rabindranath Tagore (1861–1941) was Debendranath's penultimate son. He was the first Asian to win a Nobel Prize. He also wrote what became the national anthems of India and Bangladesh and coined the title Mahatma for Indian nationalist leader Mahatma Gandhi. The youngest son of Debendranath Tagore was Budhendranath, who died at a very young age.

=== The younger generation ===
Rabindranath Tagore's son, Rathindranath (1888–1961), was a multi-talented person. Besides being an agriculturist educated in the US, a talented architect, designer, master-carpenter, painter and writer, he was also the first 'upacharya' of Visva-Bharati University. Rathindranath Tagore's wife, Pratima Devi (1893–1969), was an artist associated with Shilpa Sadan, Visva Bharati and also with dance and dance-drama. Sharmila Tagore, a well-known Mumbai actress who is connected with Rabindranath Tagore, said that her mother's mother, Latika Tagore, was the granddaughter of Rabindranath Tagore's brother, Dwijendranath. Pragnasundari Debi, granddaughter of Maharshi Debendranath Tagore, married a famous Assam author, Laxminath Bezbarua. She was a literary phenomenon in her own right: her cookbook Aamish O Niramish Ahar (1900, reprinted 1995) was a standard given to every Bengali bride with her trousseau, and earned her the appellation "India's Mrs Beeton". Nandita, daughter of Mira Devi, the youngest daughter of Rabindranath Tagore, married Krishna Kripalani, a freedom fighter, author and parliamentarian.

=== The family environment ===
The environment at Jorasanko was filled with literature, music, painting, and theatre. They had their own education system. In the earlier days, the women educated at home. Swarnakumari Debi has recalled how in her early days the governess would write something on a slate which the girls then had to copy. When Debedranath discovered this, he at once stopped such a mindless and mechanical method and brought in a better teacher, Ajodhyanath Pakrashi – a male outsider in the women's quarters. Some of the sons like Ganendra, Gunendra and Jyoitrindra set up their own private theatre. To start with men played in the role of women, but over a period of time the women participated. The family environment played a major role in the development of its members. Even Rabindranath Tagore, who went to win the Nobel Prize in literature, had very little formal education.

== Family tree ==
Genealogy chart of the Tagore family, illustrating both the Jorasanko and Pathuriaghata branches.

- Jaganath Kushari, m. Sundari Devi (Bardhaman family branch)
  - Balaram Kushari
    - Harihar Kushari
      - Ramananda Kushari
        - Moheswar Kushari
          - Sukdev Kushari
          - Panchanan Kushari
            - Joyram Tagore, m. Ganga Tagore
              - Nilmoni Tagore, m. Lalita Debee Ghosal (Jorasanko family branch)
                - Rammoni Tagore, m. Menaka Tagore (first wife), Durga Tagore (Second wife) and Alokasundori Tagore (third wife)
                  - Radhanath Tagore, m. Parvati Devi Tagore
                  - Rama Nath Tagore, m. Kumudini Tagore
                  - Dwarkanath Tagore, m. Digambari Devi Tagore
                    - Girindranath Tagore, m. Suhasini Devi Tagore
                      - Ganendranath Tagore, m. Swarnakumari Devi Tagore
                      - Gunendranath Tagore, m. Saudamini Devi
                        - Gaganendranath Tagore, m. Promod Kumari Tagore
                          - Nabendranath Tagore
                          - Gahendranath Tagore, m. Mrinalini Tagore
                          - Kanakendranath Tagore, m. Suramasundari Tagore (first wife) and Latika Tagore (second wife)
                            - Gitindranath Tagore, m. Ira Tagore
                              - Sharmila Tagore (Rinku), m. Mansoor Ali Khan Pataudi
                                - Saif Ali Khan, m. Amrita Singh (divorced), m. Kareena Kapoor
                                  - Sara Ali Khan
                                  - Ibrahim Ali Khan Pataudi
                                  - Taimur Ali Khan Pataudi
                                  - Jehangir Ali Khan Pataudi
                                - Saba Ali Khan
                                - Soha Ali Khan, m. Kunal Khemu
                                  - Inaaya Naumi Khemu
                              - Oindrila Tagore Kundu (Tinku), m. Dilip Kundu
                                - Mickey Kundu
                              - Romila Sen, m. Nikhil Sen
                        - Abanindranath Tagore, m. Suhasini Devi
                        - Samarendranath Tagore
                        - Sunayani Devi, m. Rajanimohan Chattopadhyay
                        - Binayani Devi, m. Seshendra Bhushan Chattopadhyay
                          - Pratima Devi, m. Nilanath Mukhopadhyay
                    - Debendranath Tagore, m. Sarada Devi Tagore
                      - Rabindranath Tagore, m. Mrinalini Devi Tagore
                        - Rathindranath Tagore, m. Pratima Devi
                          - Nandini Devi, m. Giridhari Lala
                          - Tulika Tagore
                            - Shomik Bose
                            - Sohini Bose
                        - Shamindranath Tagore (died at the age of 11)
                        - Renuka Devi (died at the age of 12)
                        - Meera Devi, m. Nagendranath Ganguly Ganguli
                          - Nitindranath Ganguli (diead at the age of 20)
                          - Nandita Kriplani, m. Krishna Kripalani (died childless)
                        - Madhurilata Devi (Bela), m. Saratchandra Chak Chakravarti (Bela died childless at the age of 32 due to tuberculosis)
                      - Saudamini Devi Gangopadhyay, m. Saradprasad Gangopadhyay
                        - Indumati Devi Chattopadhyay, m. Nityaranjan Chattopadhyay
                          - Leela Devi Chaudhuri, m Manmathanath Chaudhuri
                            - Devika Rani, m. Himanshu Rai (first husband) and Svetoslav Roerich (second husband)
                            - Nikhil Chaudhuri
                            - Mahim Chaudhuri
                      - Satyendranath Tagore, m. Jnanadanandini Devi Tagore
                        - Surendranath Tagore, m. Shonga Devi
                          - Jaya Tagore, m. Kulprasad Sen (Motru)
                          - Manjusri Tagore, m. K.P Chattopadhyay
                            - Sunando Tagore, m. Pranati Tagore
                            - Gautam Chattopadhyay, m. Jayasri Chattapadhyay
                              - Dhiman Chattopadhyay
                        - Kabindranath Tagore, m. Shalini Debi Tagore
                        - Surendranath Tagore
                          - Saumyendranath Tagore, m. Srimati Hutheesing
                        - Indira Devi Chaudhurani, m. Pramatha Chaudhuri
                          - Supriyo Tagore
                      - Hemendranath Tagore, m. Tripura Sundari Devi
                        - Hitendranath Tagore
                        - Kshitindranath Tagore
                        - Ritendranath Tagore, m. Shobha Debi Tagore
                        - Pragyasundari Devi, m. Lakshminath Bezbaroa
                        - Purnima Devi (Sudakshina), m. Sir Jwala Prasada
                          - Kunwar Jyoti Prasad, m. Pamela Devi
                            - Kunwar Jitendra Prasada, m. Kanta Prasada
                              - Kunwar Jitin Prasada, m. Neha Seth
                                - Janav Prasada
                                - Jananya Prasada
                              - Jahnavi Prasada
                            - Kunwar Jayendra Prasada, m. Rajumari Rutti Singh of Birwa
                              - Kunwar Jayesh Prasada m Neelima Rawat
                                - Kunwar Jagrit Prasada
                                - Kunwar Jayaditya Prasada
                              - Kunwar Jivesh Prasada m Radhika Sharma
                                - Kunwar Jaidev Prasada
                              - Kunwar Jinesh Prasada m Mandakini Kaul
                                - Kunwar Janmejay Prasada
                        - Pratibha Devi, m. Ashutosh Chaudhuri
                          - Arya Chaudhuri
                        - Abhi Devi
                        - Manisha Devi, m. D.N. Chatterjee
                          - Dipty Chaudhuri, m. Pandit Navin Chandra Ray
                        - Manisha Devi
                        - Shovana Devi, m. Nagendranath Mukhopadhyay
                        - Sushama Devi
                        - Sunrita Devi
                      - Dwijendranath Tagore, m. Sarbasundari Tagore
                        - Sudhindranath Tagore, m. Lata devi Tagore
                          - Latika Tagore, m. Kanakendranath Tagore
                        - Saroja Devi Chatterji
                          - Saumyendranath Tagore, m. Srimati Hutheesingh
                        - Dwipendranath Tagore, m. Hemlata Tagore (first wife) and Sushila Tagore (Second wife)
                          - Dinendranath Tagore (Dinu Thakur), m. Binapani Devi (first wife) and Kamala Devi (second wife)
                          - Nalini Chowdhury, m. Suhrit Nath Chowdhury
                            - Purnima Chowdhury, m. Subir Tagore
                              - Maitreya Tagore
                        - Arunendranath Tagore
                        - Nitindranath Tagore
                        - Kritindranath Tagore
                      - Birendranath Tagore
                        - Balendranath Tagore
                      - Jyotirindranath Tagore, m. Kadambari Devi
                      - Somendranath Tagore, m. Suchita Devi Tagore
                      - Swarnakumari Devi, m. Janakinath Sur
                        - Jyotsnanath Sur
                        - Sarala Devi Chaudhurani, m. Rambhuj Dutt Sur
                        - Tapasi Sur
                      - Saratkumari Devi, m. Jadugopal Mukherjee
                        - Supravasundari Devi Haldar, m. Sukumar Haldar
                      - Barnakumari Devi
                      - Sukumari Devi Chaudhuri, m. Durgadas Chaudhuri
                        - Ashutosh Chaudhuri, m. Pratibha Devi Chaudhuri
                      - Punyendranath Tagore
                      - Budhendranath Tagore
                        - Rekha Menon Tagore, m. Dr. V. K. Narayana Menon
                    - Nagendranath Tagore
                - Ramlochan Tagore (adopted son)
                - Rambullav Tagore
              - Darpanarayan Tagore (Pathuriaghata family branch)
                - Gopi Mohan Tagore, m. Rukmani Tagore (first wife) and Sarla Tagore (second wife)
                  - Hara Kumar Tagore, m. Shibsundari Devi
                    - Jatindramohan Tagore
                    - Sourindra Mohun Tagore
                      - Prodyot Coomar Tagore
                  - Prasanna Coomar Tagore
                    - Suhasini Devi, m. Abanindranath Tagore
                    - Gnanendramohan Tagore, m. Kamalmani Tagore
                  - Kali kumar Tagore
                  - Surji Kumar Tagore
                  - Chandra Kumar Tagore
                  - Nanda Kumar Tagore
                - Harimohan Tagore
                  - Nandalal Tagore
                    - Lalit Mohan Tagore
                    - Upendra Mohan Tagore
                    - Brasendra Mohan Tagore
                - Radha Mohan Tagore
                - Krishna Mohan Tagore
                - Pyare Mohan Tagore
                - Ladli Mohan Tagore
                  - Harolal Tagore
                  - Shamlal Tagore
                - Mohini Mohan Tagore
                  - Kanailal Tagore
                  - Gopal Lal Tagore
                    - Kali Kishan Tagore
              - Anunderam Tagore (Koilaghata family branch)
              - Gobinderam Tagore (Chorbagan family branch)

== Gallery ==
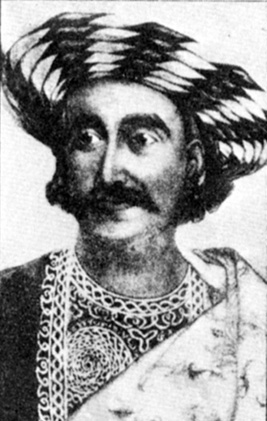
Dwarkanath Tagore

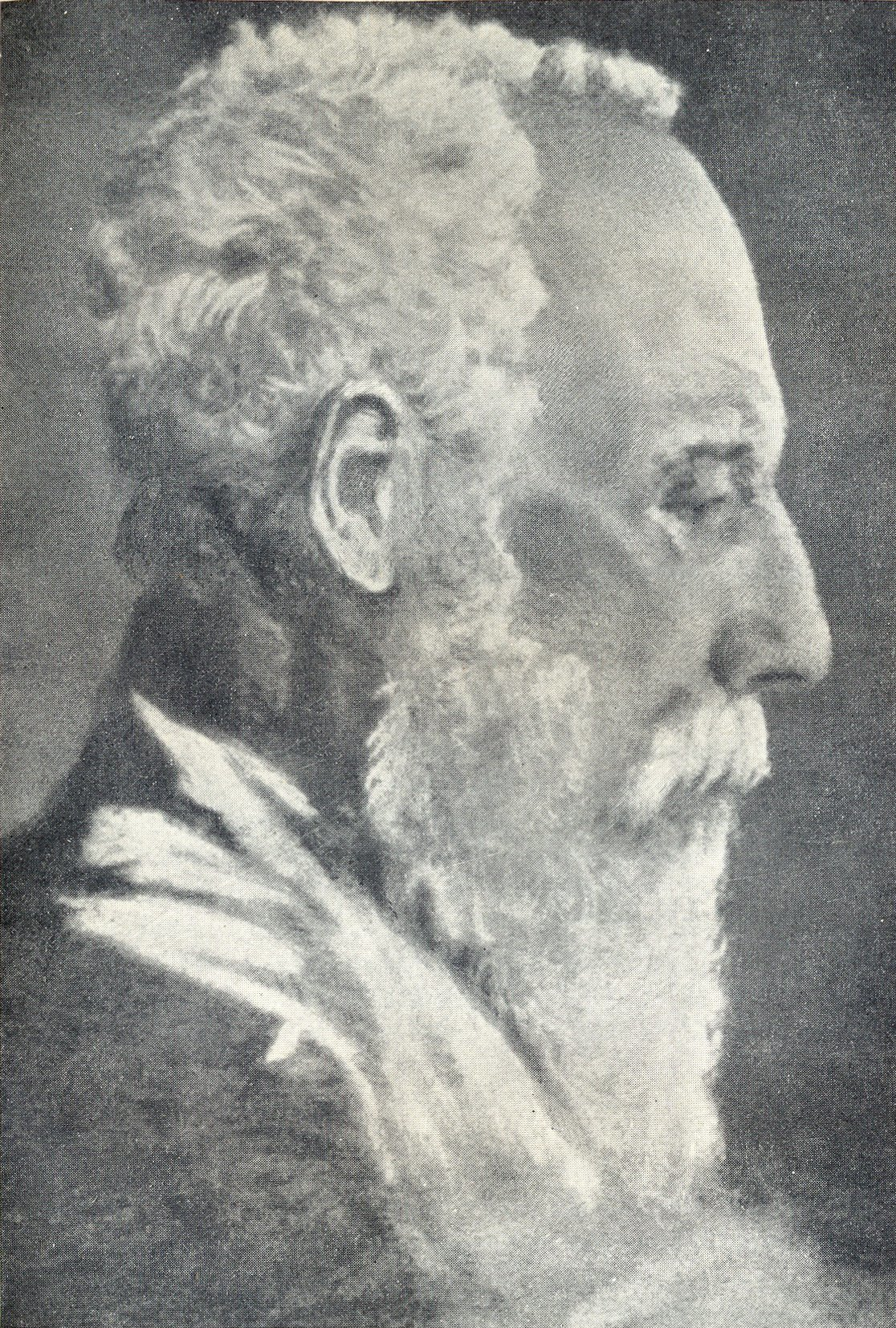
Debendranath Tagore

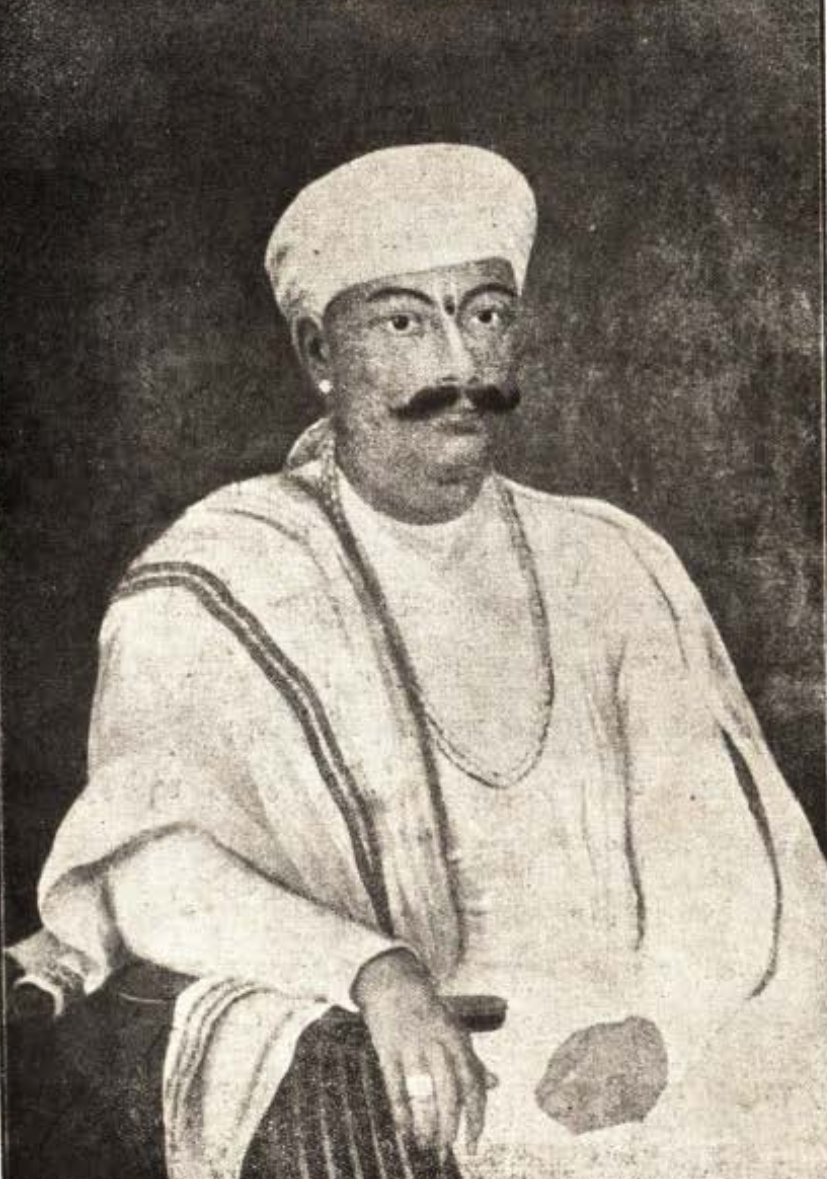
Gopi Mohan Tagore

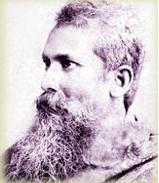
Dwijendranath Tagore

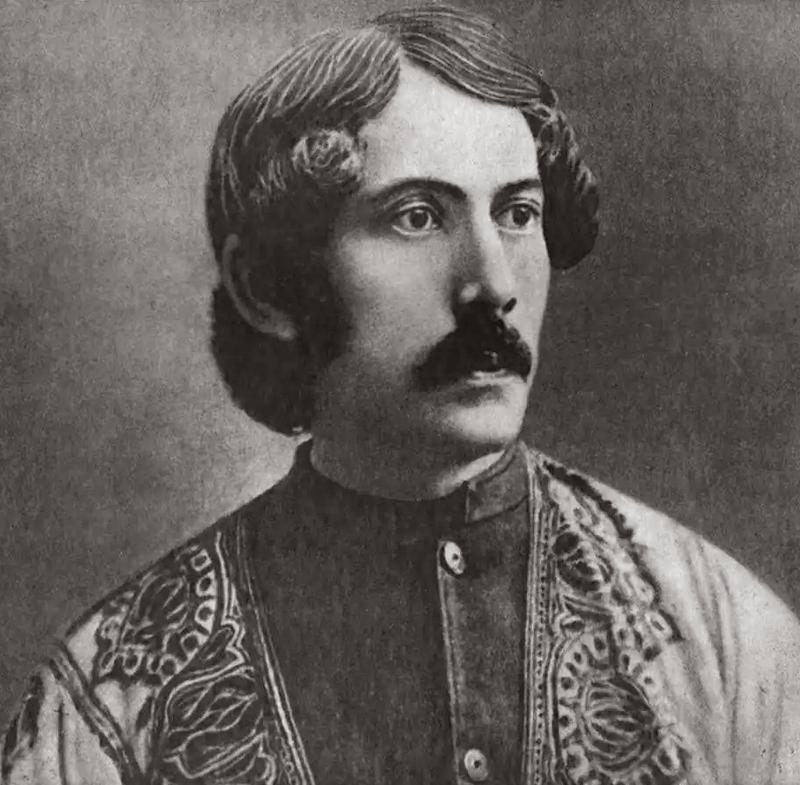
Jyotirindranath Tagore

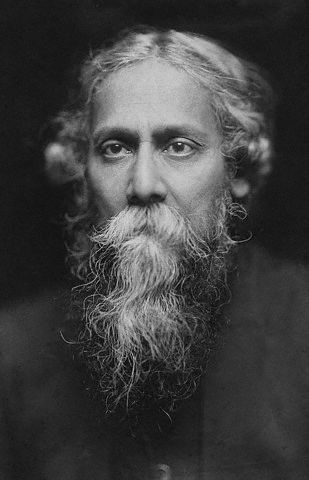
Rabindranath Tagore

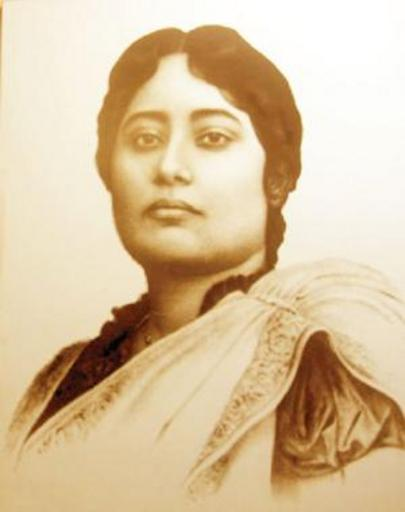
Mrinalini Devi Tagore

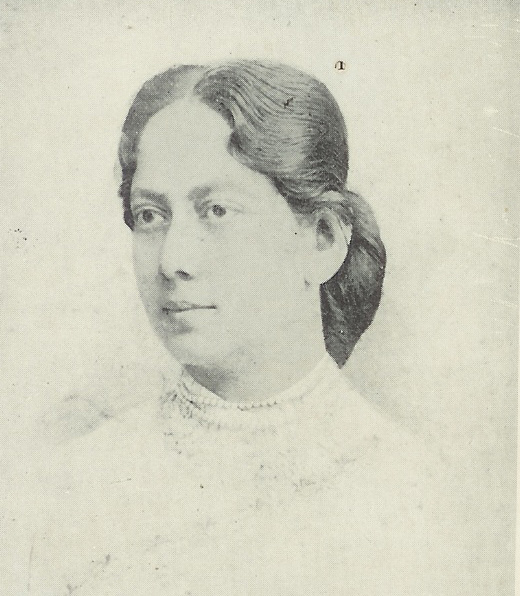
Swarnakumari Devi

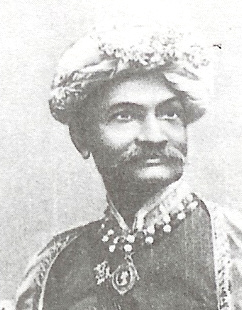
Jatindramohan Tagore

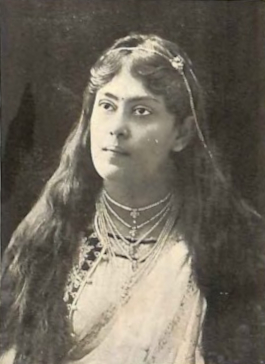
Sarala Devi Chaudhurani

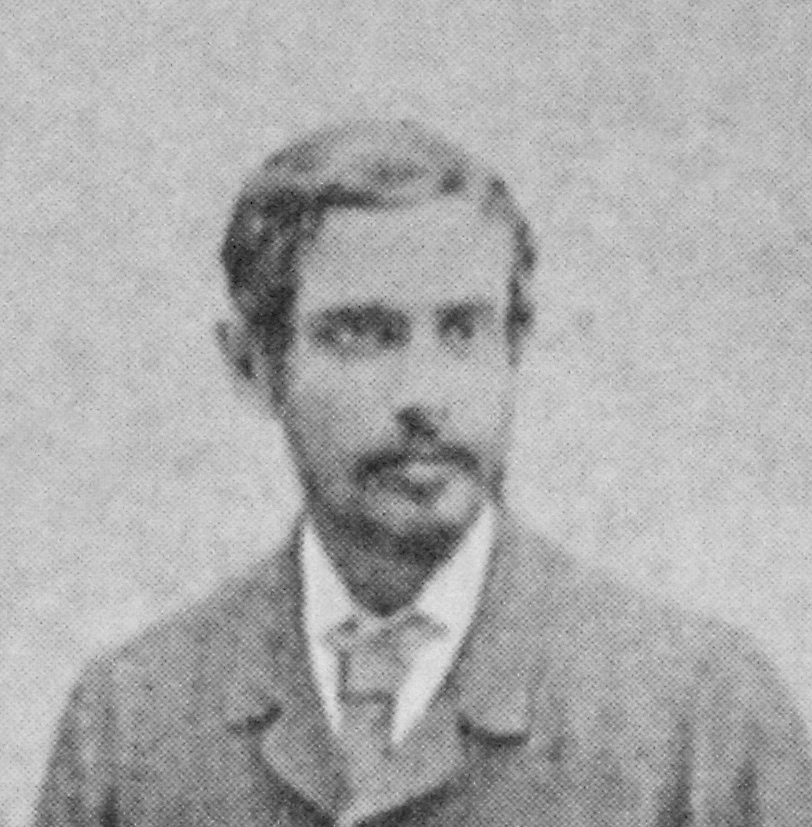
Satyendranath Tagore

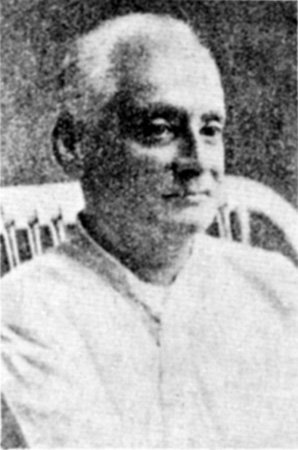
Gaganendranath Tagore

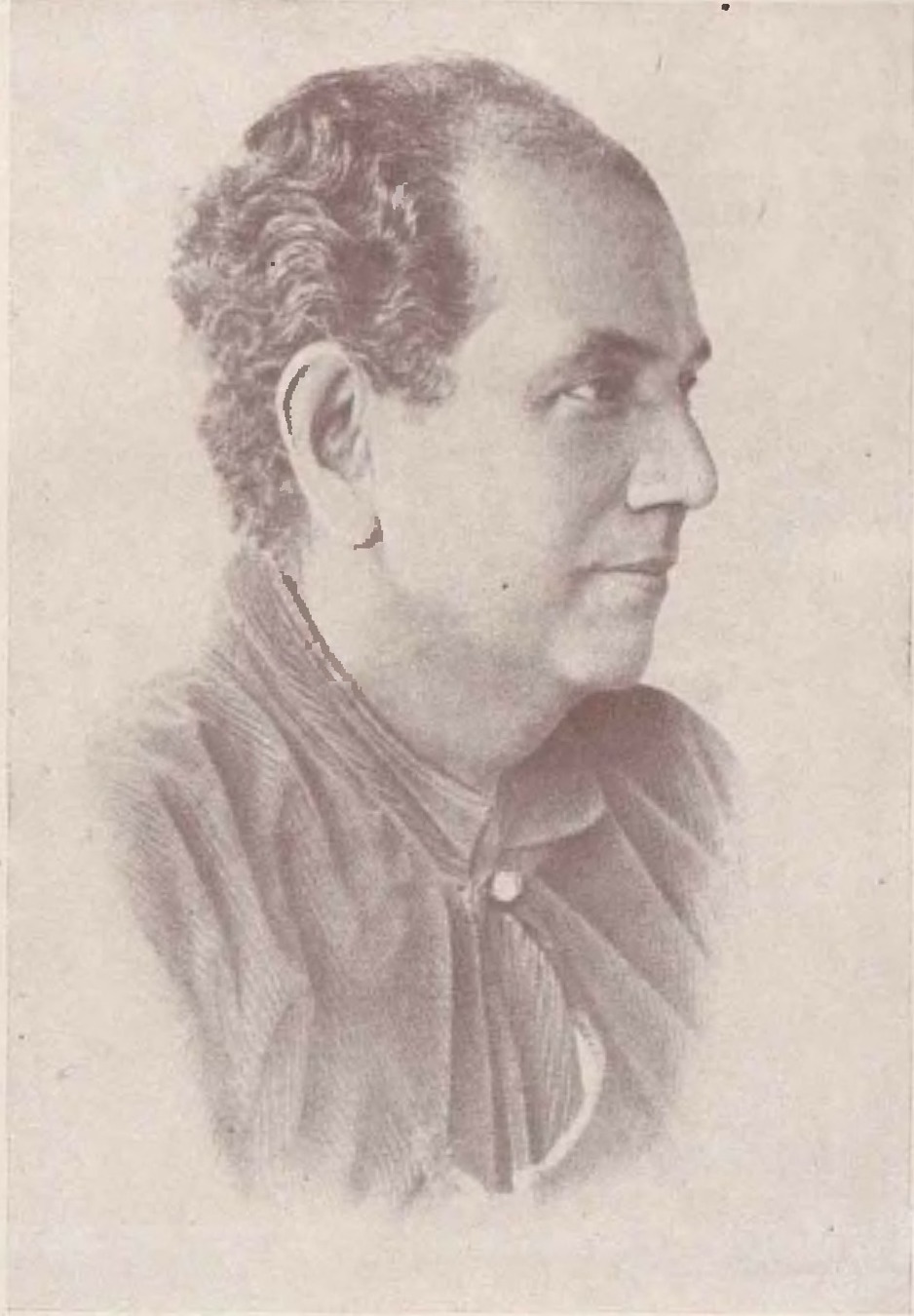
Abanindranath Tagore

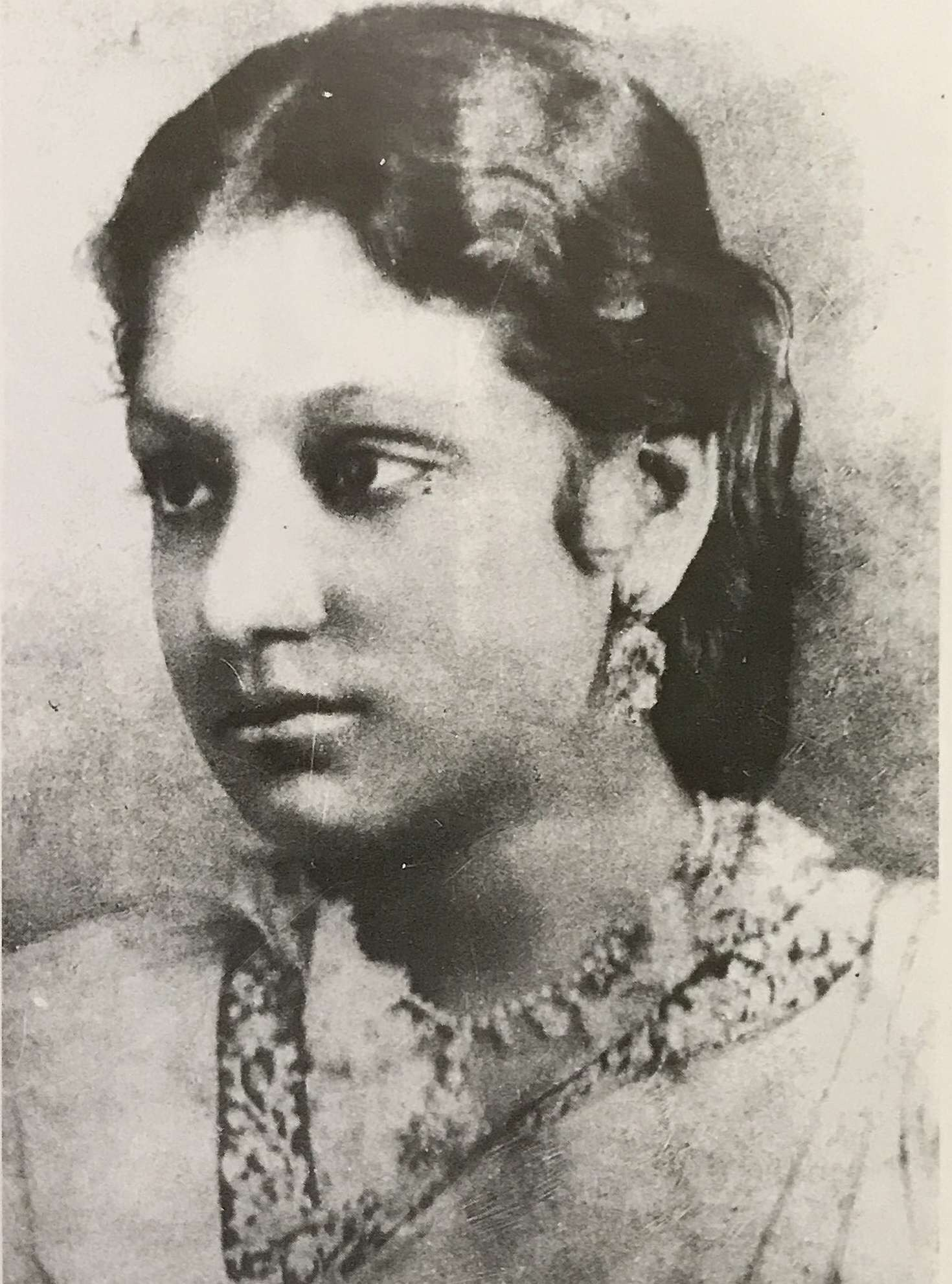
Sunayani Devi

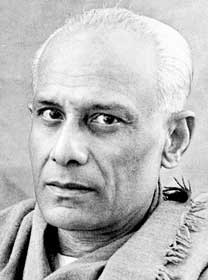
Rathindranath Tagore

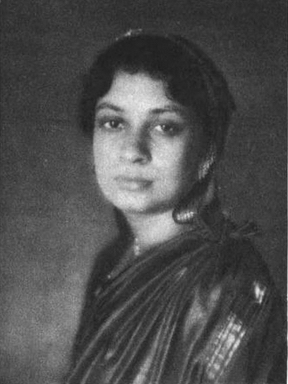
Pratima Devi

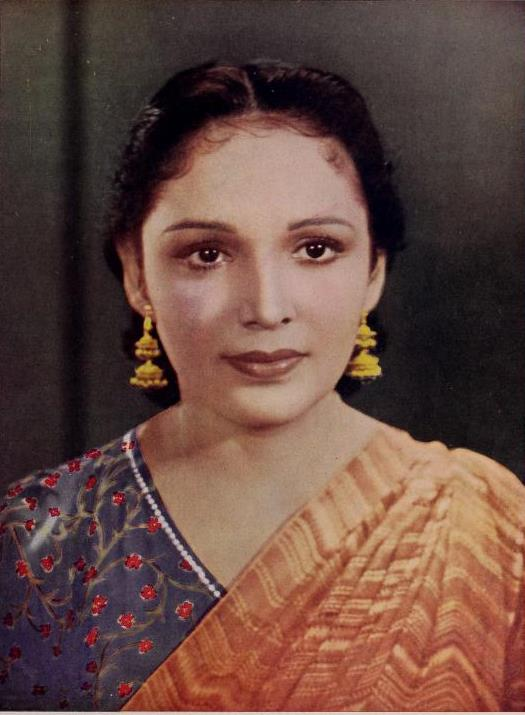
Devika Rani

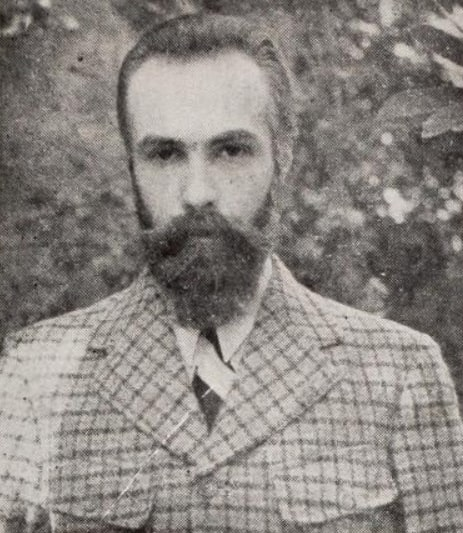
Svetoslav Roerich

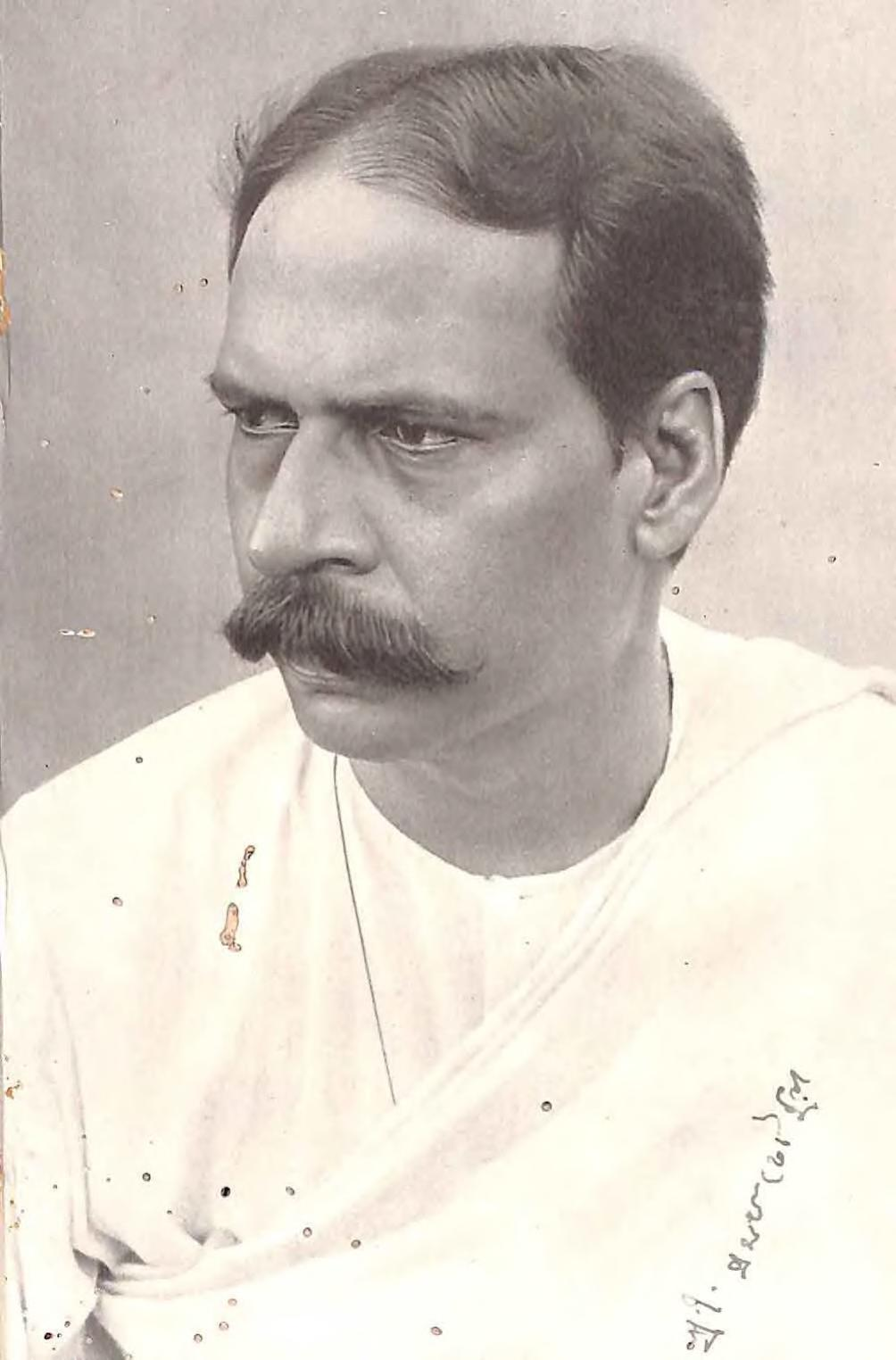
Pramatha Chaudhuri

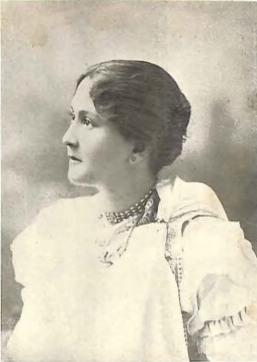
Pragyasundari Devi

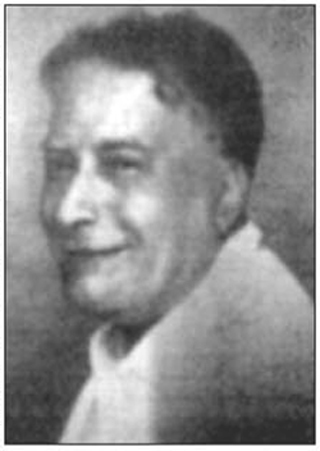
Lakhminath Bezbarua

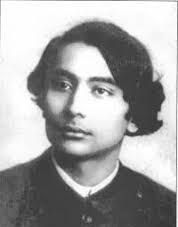
Saumyendranath Tagore

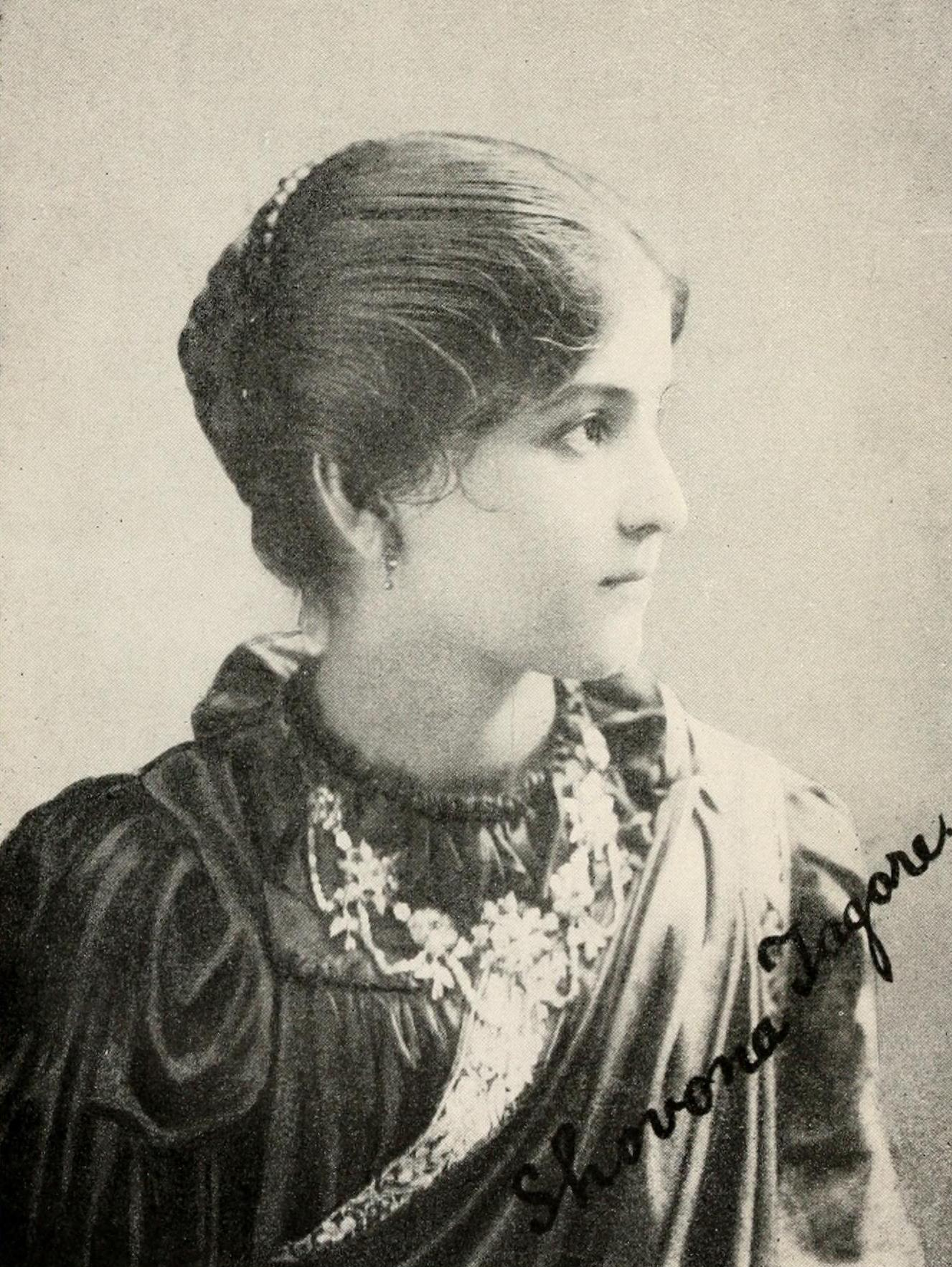
Shobhanasundari Mukhopadhyay

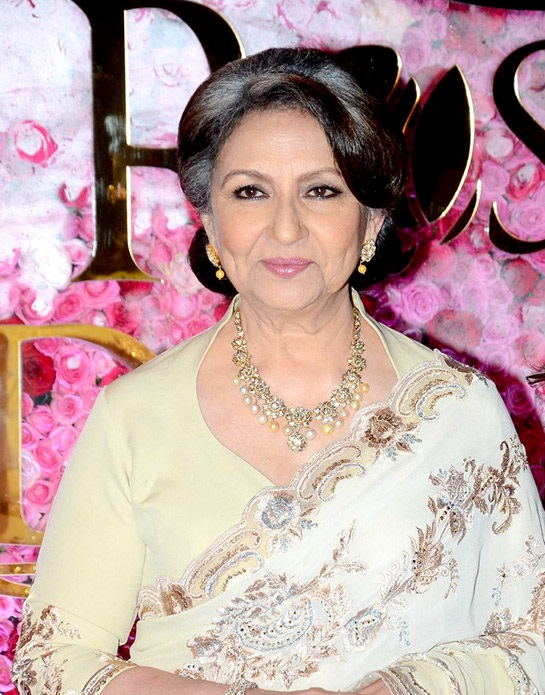
Sharmila Tagore

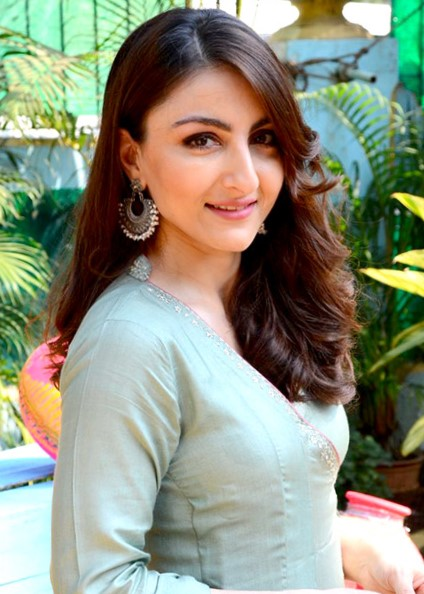
Soha Ali Khan

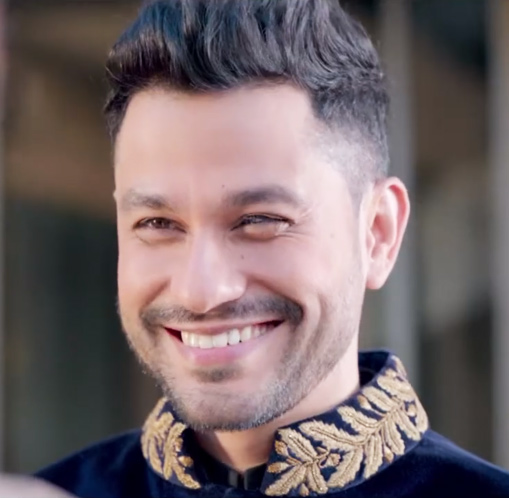
Kunal Khemu

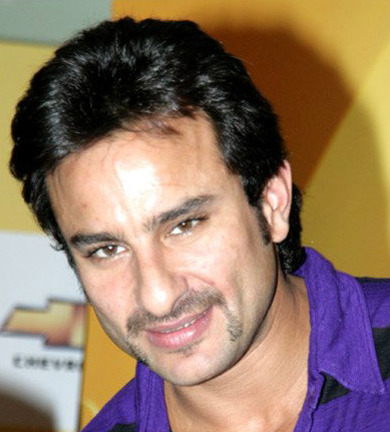
Saif Ali Khan

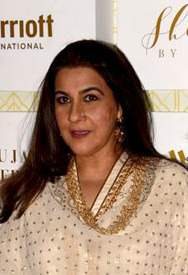
Amrita Singh

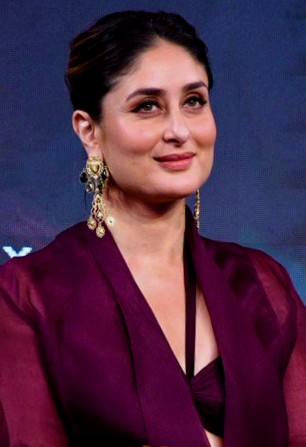
Kareena Kapoor Khan

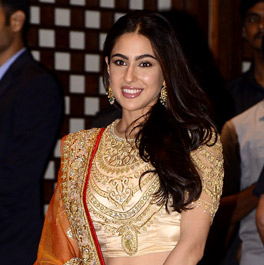
Sara Ali Khan

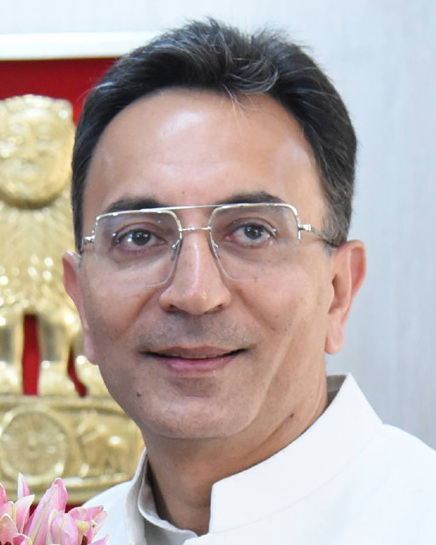
Jitin Prasada
