= Pathuriaghata =

- Neighbourhood in Kolkata (Calcutta)
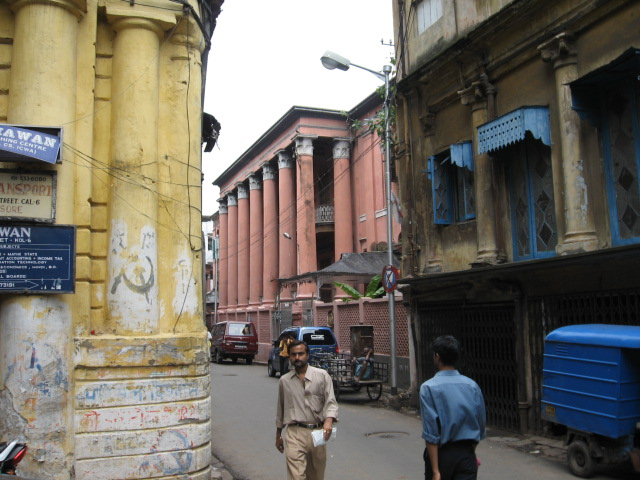
- Pathuriaghata Street

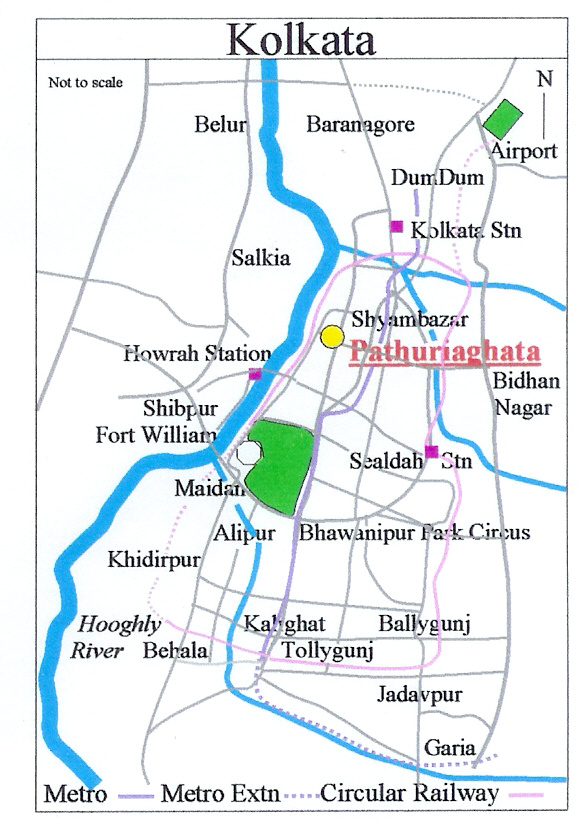
- Coordinates: 22.5895°N 88.3548°E
- Country: India
- State: West Bengal
- City: Kolkata
- District: Kolkata
- Metro Station: Girish Park and Sobhabazar Sutanuti
- Municipal Corporation: Kolkata Municipal Corporation
- KMC ward: 24
- Elevation: 36 ft (11 m)

Population
  - Total: For population see linked KMC ward page
- Time zone: UTC+5:30 (IST)
- PIN: 700006
- Area code: +91 33
- Lok Sabha constituency: Kolkata Uttar
- Vidhan Sabha constituency: Shyampukur

Pathuriaghata is a neighbourhood of North Kolkata in Kolkata district, in the Indian state of West Bengal. It is one of the oldest residential areas in what was Sutanuti. Once the abode of the Bengali rich, the neighbourhood and its surrounding areas are now dominated by Marwaris. Even in the 21st century the area is replete with colonnaded mansions.

== The Tagores ==
Amongst the oldest and most renowned residents of the neighbourhood were the Tagores. Jairama Tagore, who amassed a large fortune as a merchant and as Dewan to the French government at Chandannagar, shifted from Gobindapur to Pathuriaghata, when the British constructed new Fort William in the mid-eighteenth century. There is a road named after his son, Darpanarayan Tagore (1731–1793), considered by many as the founder of the Tagore family. It is between Maharshi Debendra Road and Jadulal Mullick Road in Ward 21 of Kolkata Municipal Corporation. That is just off Pathuriaghata, but under Jorabagan police station. The Tagore family established themselves at Pathuriaghata, Jorasanko, Kailahata and Chorbagan, all neighbourhoods in north Kolkata.

=== Banga Natyalaya ===
‘Tagore Castle’ had an auditorium and the Tagores patronised Banga Natyalay, from 1859 to 1872. It was started by Jatindra Mohan Tagore and his brother Shourendra Mohan Tagore, both ardent theatre enthusiasts. The first play staged here was Kalidas’ Mālavikāgnimitram in Sanskrit, in July 1859.

=== Sambad Prabhakar ===
Jogendra Mohan Tagore of Pathuriaghata, helped Ishwar Chandra Gupta to publish Sambad Prabhakar, first as a weekly from 28 January 1831. After passing through vicissitudes, it became a daily and played an important role in forming modern Bengali society.

== The Mullick family ==
Next to the turrets of Tagore Castle on Prasanna Kumar Tagore Street is the house of the Mullick family topped by classical statuary. Three large structures have already come up next to these, one of them is the Burrabazar branch of Metropolitan School, established in 1887. Jadulal Mullick (1844-1894) had numerous contributions in social and law spheres. At one time he donated enormously to the Oriental Seminary from where he had passed Entrance, school-leaving examination. Jadulal Mullick has a road named after him in the area. His son, Manmathanath Mullick, bought a pair of zebras from Alipore Zoological Gardens to pull his carriage through the streets of Kolkata. He had nine types of carriages and a stable full of horses. One of the grandsons of Jadulal Mullick, Prodyunno Kumar Mullick had 35 cars, out of which 10 were Rolls-Royce. The Mullicks have contributed enormously for charitable purposes. The courtyard of Jadulal Mullick's house has intricate cast iron works, one of the finest in Kolkata.

== The Ghosh family ==
The Ghosh family came to Pathuriaghata from Keshpur at the time of Warren Hastings. It is said that Warren Hastings and his wife visited the Ghosh family. Khelat Chandra Ghosh (1829-1878), grandson of Hasting’s banyan (clerk) Ramlochan Ghosh, moved out of the old family house at 46 Pathuriaghata Street to a new house at 47 Pathuriaghata Street. The family made a substantial contribution in music and charity. There is a lane named after him in Ward No. 24 (not shown in the map alongside). This mansion is filled with marble sculptures, paintings, crystal chandeliers and other art objects.

The wife of former president of the Board of Control for Cricket in India and the International Cricket Council, Jagmohan Dalmiya, hails from this family. The lineage of this family is amongst the oldest in Calcutta and can be traced back to 13 generations on records.

== Pathuriaghata picture gallery ==
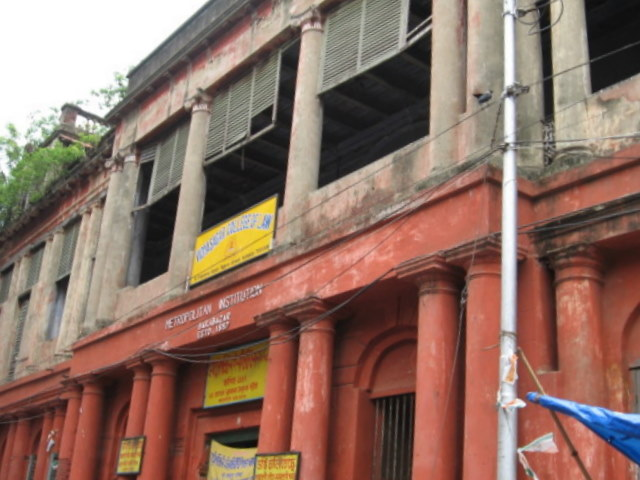
The Burrabazar branch of the Metropolitan Institution

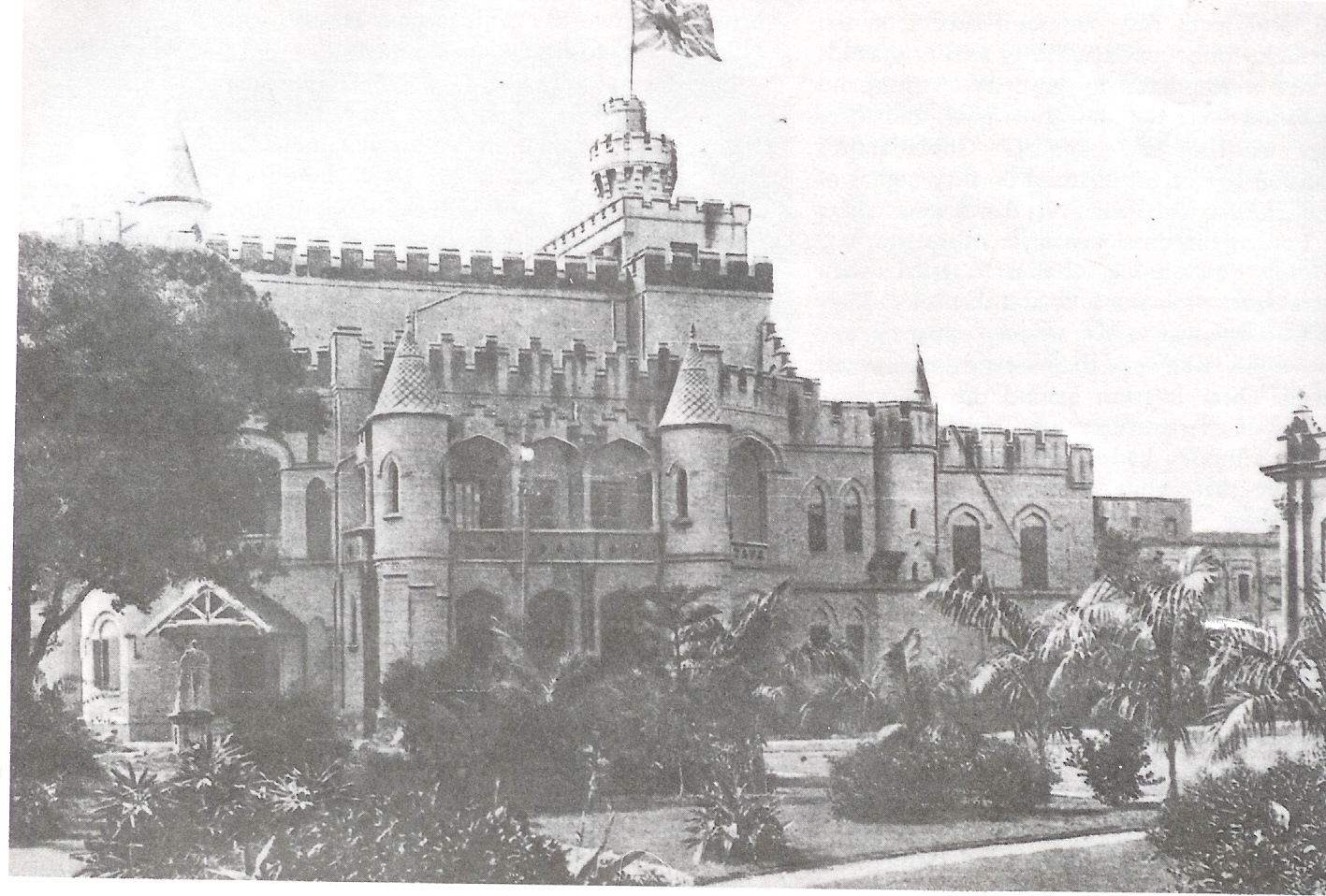
Tagore Castle in 1907

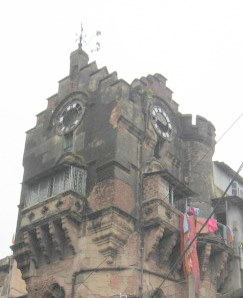
A portion of what remains of Tagore Castle

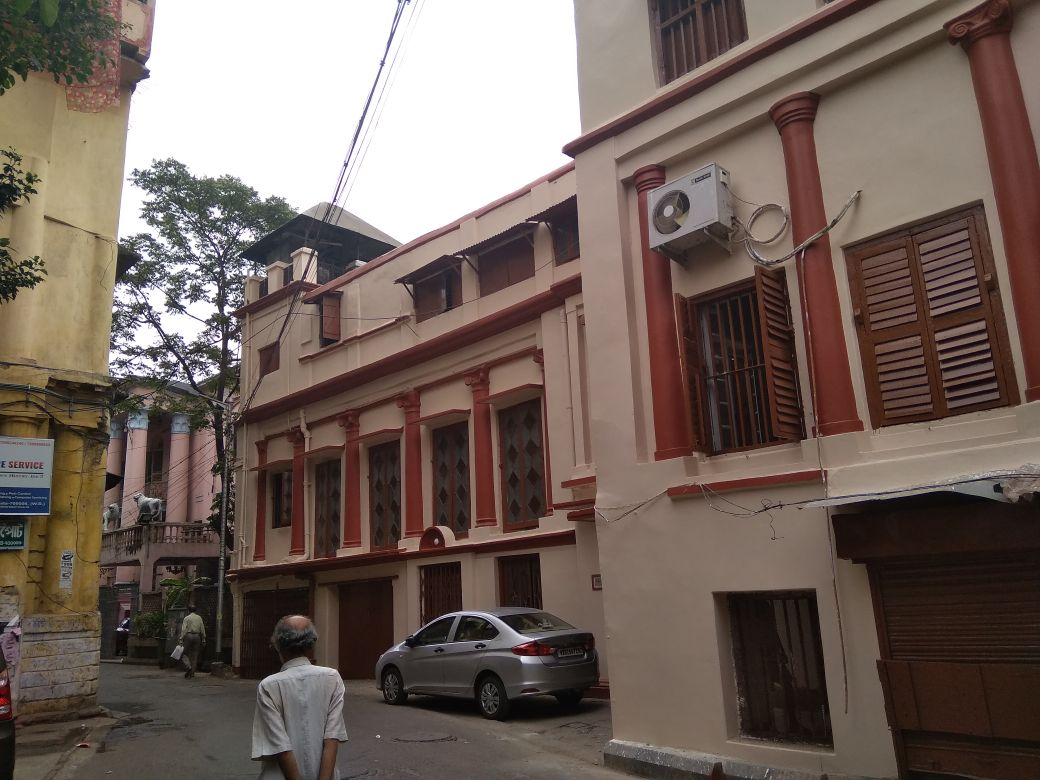
Pathuriaghata Street, Kolkata, India
