= Pragyasundari Devi =

Indian cookbook author and magazine editor (1872–1950)

- প্রজ্ঞাসুন্দরী দেবী
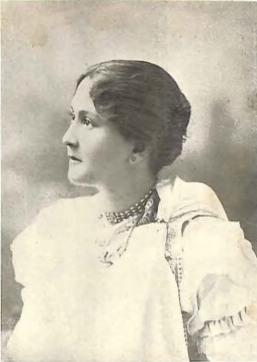
- Pragyasundari Devi, c. 1920
- Pronunciation: [pɾoɡːaʃund̪ɔɾi d̪ebi]
- Born: c. 1870; Jorasanko Thakur Bari, Calcutta, Bengal Presidency, British India (now West Bengal, India)
- Died: 1950; Assam, India
- Other name: Pragyasundari Bezbarua
- Citizenship: British Indian (1870–1947); Indian (1947–1950)
- Occupations: Food writer; literary editor
- Years active: 1897–1950
- Era: Bengal Renaissance
- Works: Bibliography
- Spouse: Lakshminath Bezbarua (m. 1891; died 1938)
- Children: 4
- Father: Hemendranath Tagore
- Relatives: Dwarkanath Tagore (great-grandfather); Debendranath Tagore (grandfather); Dwijendranath Tagore (uncle); Satyendranath Tagore (uncle); Jyotirindranath Tagore (uncle); Swarnakumari Devi (aunt); Rabindranath Tagore (uncle); Shobhanasundari Mukhopadhyay (sister); Purnima Devi (sister); Sarala Devi Chaudhurani (cousin)
- Family: Tagore family
- Writing career
- Language: Bengali
- Period: Modern
- Genres: Food writing; women's magazine
- Subjects: Recipes; cooking techniques; ingredient; nutrition facts
- Notable work: Amish O Niramish Ahar

Signature
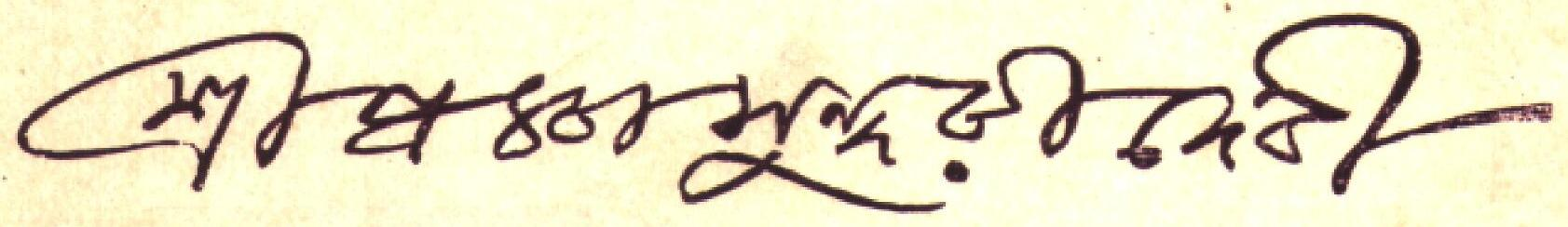

Pragyasundari Devi (Note: Bengali: প্রজ্ঞাসুন্দরী দেবী, Bengali pronunciation: [pɾoɡːaʃund̪ɔɾi d̪ebi]; Assamese: প্ৰজ্ঞাসুন্দৰী দেৱী, Assamese pronunciation: [pɹɔɡjãxundɔɹi dɛwi]; also spelt as Pragyasundari Debi, Pragya Sundari Devi, Prajna Sundari Devi, or Prajnasundari Bezbarua.) (Bengali: প্রজ্ঞাসুন্দরী দেবী, pronounced [pɾoɡːaʃund̪ɔɾi d̪ebi]; c. 1870 – 1950) was an Indian food writer and literary editor. Her Amish O Niramish Ahar was a "significant" early cookbook in the Bengali language.

== Early life ==
Pragyasundari Devi was the daughter of scientist Hemendranath Tagore and the sister of Purnima Devi. Her grandfather was philosopher Debendranath Tagore and her great-grandfather was industrialist Dwarkanath Tagore. Nobel laureate and poet Rabindranath Tagore was her uncle. Other kin in the extended Tagore family included her aunt, novelist Swarnakumari Devi, her uncle, philosopher Dwijendranath Tagore, another uncle, civil servant Satyendranath Tagore, and another uncle, artist Jyotirindranath Tagore. Indian feminist Sarala Devi Chaudhurani was her first cousin.

== Career ==
Her first cookbook, sometimes called "the first cookbook in Bengali", Amish O Niramish Ahar, was published in 1902. She warned readers in this first volume for the home cook that "Spending a lot of money is no guarantee for good food," as she encouraged the efficient use of inexpensive vegetables. She published a second vegetarian cookbook, and later two more cookbooks that included some meat dishes. Her later cookbooks focused on the cookery of Assam and on pickles and preserves.

Beginning in 1897, Pragyasundari Devi edited a women's magazine, Punya, which included recipes.

== Personal life ==
Pragyasundari Devi married Lakshminath Bezbaroa, an Assamese-language writer and literary agent in 1891. They had four daughters, one of whom died very young, five granddaughters and one grandson, and eleven great-grandchildren. He encouraged her to publish her recipes in book form. Pragyasundari Devi died in 1950. Ira Ghosh, her granddaughter, wrote a biographical introduction to a recent edition of Amish O Niramish Ahar, and updated it with more current measurements and directions. Another granddaughter, Ritha Devi, was a well-known Odissi dancer.

== Bibliography ==
=== Cookbook ===
- Amish O Niramish Ahar (Volume I) ("Non-vegetarian and vegetarian food"; 1900) — আমিষ ও নিরামিষ আহার (প্রথম খণ্ড)
- Amish O Niramish Ahar (Volume II) (1903) — আমিষ ও নিরামিষ আহার (দ্বিতীয় খণ্ড)
- Amish O Niramish Ahar (Volume III) (1907) — আমিষ ও নিরামিষ আহার (তৃতীয় খণ্ড)

=== Women's magazine ===
- Punya ("Virtue", 1897) — পুণ্য
