= Kadambari Devi =

Wife of Jyotirindranath Tagore, sister-in-law of Rabindranath Tagore

- কাদম্বরী দেবী
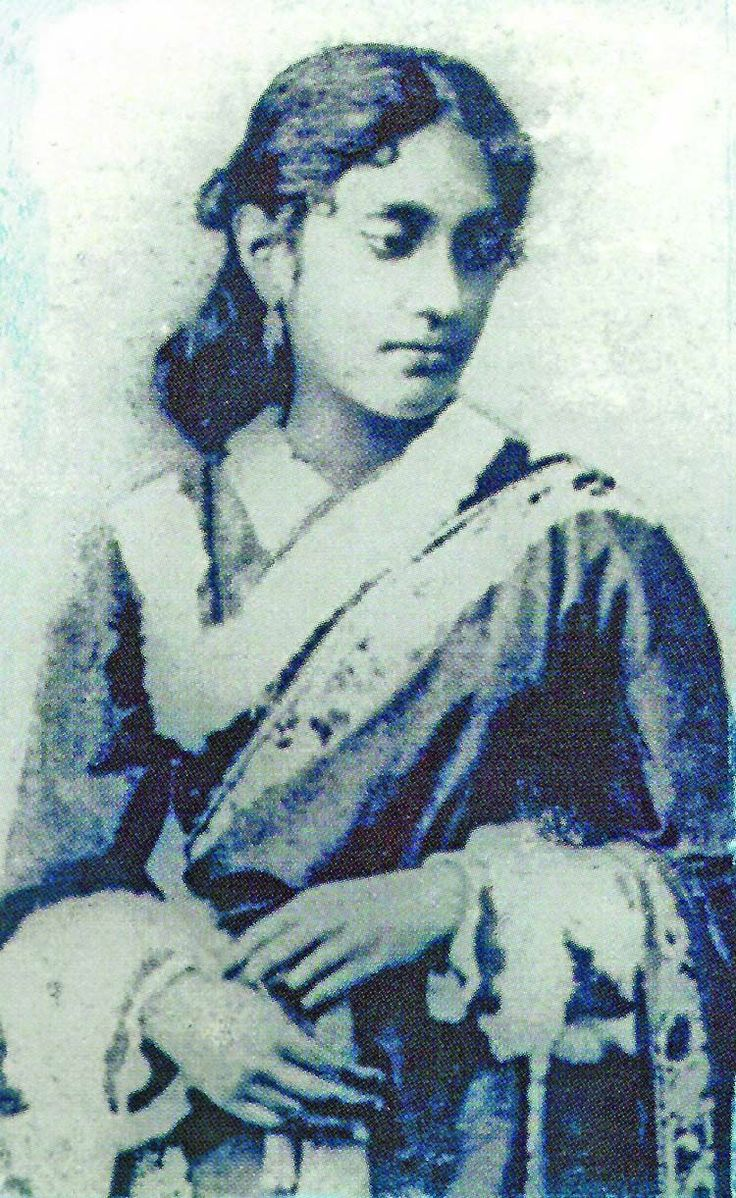
- Photograph of Kadambari Devi
- Born: Matangini Gangopadhyay; 5 July 1859; Calcutta, Bengal Presidency, British India (today Kolkata, India)
- Died: 21 April 1884 (aged 24); Calcutta, Bengal Presidency, British India
- Spouse: Jyotirindranath Tagore (m. 1868; died 1884)
- Relatives: Debendranath, Dwijendranath, Satyendranath, Hemendranath, Swarnakumari, Rabindranath Tagore (in-laws)
- Family: Tagore family

Kadambari Devi (born Matangini Gangopadhyay; 5 July 1859 – 21 April 1884) was a literary critic and the wife of Bengali intellect Jyotirindranath Tagore. A member of Tagore family, she was the sister-in-law of Rabindranath Tagore. Between the spring and autumn of 1883, Jyotirindranath, Kadambari and Rabindranath lived in Karwar. Today she's mostly known for her close relationship with Rabindranath. She died by suicide in April 1884.

== Early life ==
Kadambari Devi was born as Matangini Gangopadhyay to Shyam Ganguly and Trailokyasundari Devi in Kolkata, West Bengal, on 5 July 1859. She was the third child to her parents. Her grandfather Jaganmohan Gangopadhyay was a famous musician from whom she took music lessons.

== Marriage ==
She was ten years younger than her husband Jyotirindranath Tagore who married her on 5 July 1868 (২৫শে আষাঢ়, ১২৭৫ বঙ্গাব্দ), when she was only nine years old and nearly the same age as her brother-in-law Rabindranath Tagore, being only two years older than him. Her husband arranged for her to be educated.

She inspired young Rabindranath in composing many of his poems with her creative feedback and comments. She was also a good friend and playmate. She was one of the women who played a very important part in his life. Her relationship with Tagore was controversial but actually it was a more friendly relationship between them and had elements of tragedy.

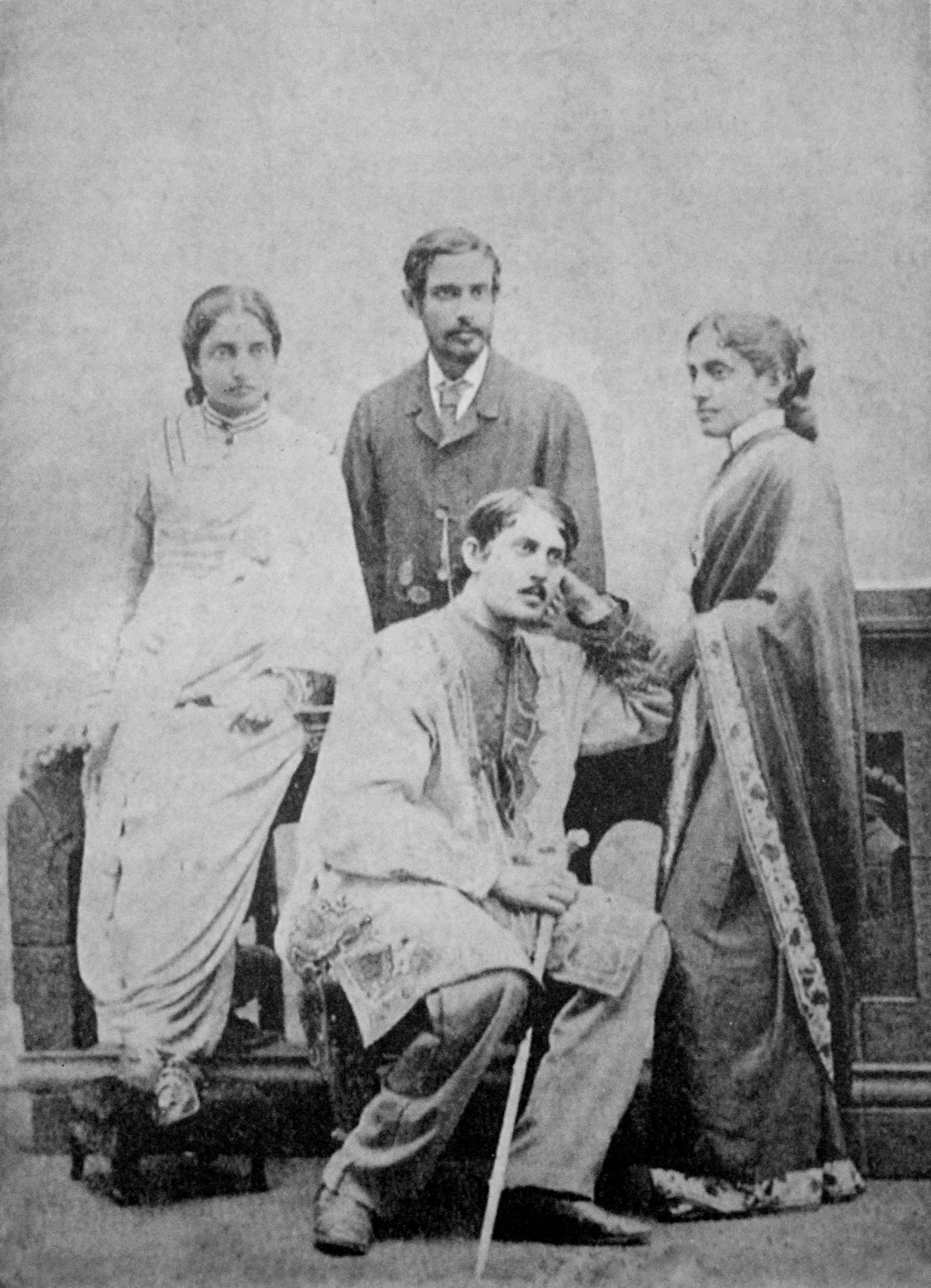
Jnanadanandini Devi, Satyendranath Tagore, Kadambari Devi and Jyotirindranath Tagore (1867)

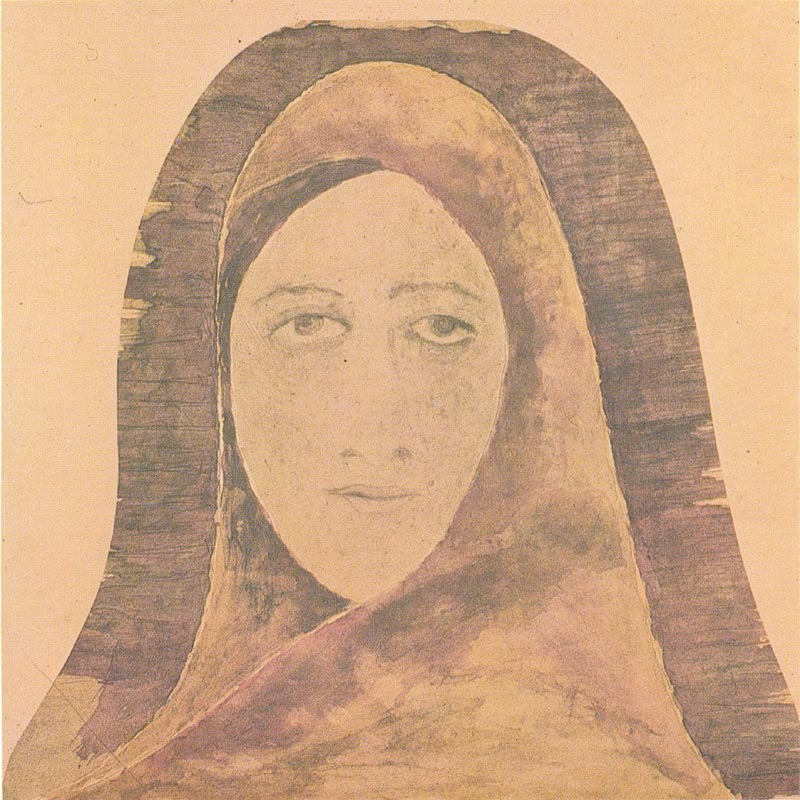
Face of a woman, inspired by Kadambari Devi, by Rabindranath Tagore. Ink on paper. National Gallery of Modern Art, New Delhi

== Death ==
Kadambari Devi died by suicide on 21 April 1884, a few months after the marriage of Rabindranath Tagore. The Tagore family remained silent about the incident, and no official explanation was ever documented. Over the years, however, various speculations have surfaced suggesting that emotional isolation and a profound sense of loneliness may have led her to her death. Married at a young age to Jyotirindranath Tagore, Kadambari Devi entered the Tagore household where her closest companion was the young Rabindranath. Their deep bond, rooted in friendship, literature, and intellectual exchange, gradually diminished following Rabindranath’s marriage. This widening emotional distance is believed to have deeply affected her. Compounding her sorrow was the rumored affair between her husband Jyotirindranath and the famous actress Binodini Dasi, who was allegedly pregnant with his child. On learning of this, and overwhelmed by emotional despair, Kadambari Devi consumed opium and ended her life. Her untimely death left a lasting impact on Rabindranath Tagore, influencing much of his early poetic expression and inner emotional world.

== In popular culture ==
- The classic film Charulata by Satyajit Ray which was based on Rabindranath Tagore's Nastanirh was reported to have been speculated to be based on her life and her relationship with Tagore.
- In Sukanta Roy's Bengali film Chhelebela (2002) Debashree Roy played the character alongside Jisshu Sengupta portraying Tagore.
- In Bandana Mukhopadhyay's Bengali film Chirosakha He (2007) Deepanjana Paul played the character alongside Sayandip Bhattacharya playing Tagore.
- In Rituparno Ghosh's Bengali documentary film Jeevan Smriti (2011) Raima Sen played the character alongside Samadarshi Dutta playing Tagore.
- In Suman Ghosh's Bengali film Kadambari (2015) Konkona Sen Sharma played the character alongside Parambrata Chatterjee portraying Tagore.
