= Satyendranath Dutta =

Bengali poet and rhymer (1882–1922)

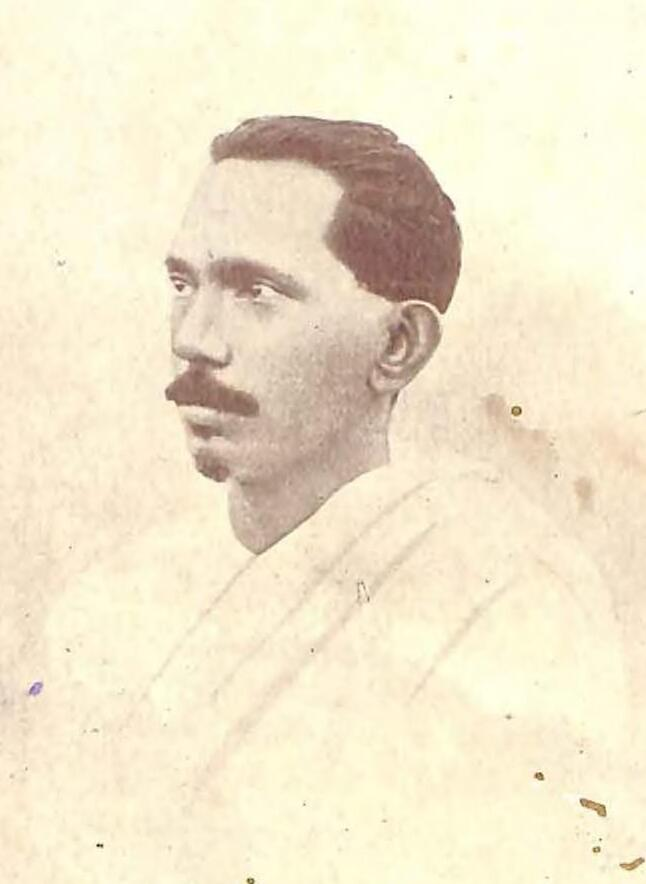
- Born: 11 February 1882; Nimta, Bengal Presidency, British India
- Died: 25 June 1922 (aged 40); Calcutta, Bengal Presidency, British India
- Occupation: Poet
- Spouse: Kanaklata Devi
- Writing career
- Pen name: Navakumar, Kabiratna, Ashitipar Sharma, Tribikram Varman, Kalamgir
- Period: Tattwabodhini
- Notable works: Fuler Fasal (1911); Kuhu O Keka (1912)

Satyendranath Dutta (also spelt Satyendranath Datta or Satyendra Nath Dutta; Bengali: সত্যেন্দ্রনাথ দত্ত; 11 February 1882 – 25 June 1922) was a Bengali poet and is considered the "wizard of rhymes" ('ছন্দের জাদুকর'; lit. 'chhonder jadukar'). Satyendranath Dutta was an expert in many disciplines of intellectual enquiry including medieval Indian history, culture, and mythology.

== Early life and education ==
Satyendranath Dutta was the son of Rajaninath Dutta, who was a trader. He was born on 11 February 1882 at Nimta, Bengal Presidency, British India. The family hailed from Chupi in Purba Bardhaman district He was the only son of his parents. His grandfather, Akshay Kumar Datta, was a great thinker, Brahmo social reformer and writer who was the guiding spirit of the Tattwabodhini Patrika. After passing the school-leaving examination from the Central Collegiate School, Satyendranath received his graduate-level education from the General Assembly's Institution (now Scottish Church College) in Kolkata. He left without taking a degree. After unsuccessfully joining the ranks of his father in their family business, he quit that to devote his energies entirely to literary pursuits. He wrote poems like Jatir Pati.

== Personal life ==
In 1903, Satyendranath Dutta married Kanaklata Devi, eldest daughter of Ishan Chandra Bose and Giribala Devi (her biological mother Noroda Sundari Devi, the first wife of Ishan Chandra Bose, died when Kanaklata and her siblings were young children). Kanaklata Devi was from a wealthy Hindu Kulin Kayastha family, originally hailing from Dhaka Nayabari and later settled at Howrah where the family owned estates. The marriage was fixed by their families, which was a common practice at that time. After Satyendranath Dutta's death in 1922, Kanaklata Devi lived a lonely life and died in December 1967.

== Death ==
He died on 25 June 1922, aged 40. Rabindranath Tagore immortalized Satyendranath in a poem written after his death. Kazi Nazrul Islam also wrote a poem titled 'Sayendranath' eulogizing his death.

== Works ==
Satyendranath Dutta composed poems and initially composed poems for the Bengali magazine Bharati. Although his stylistic nuances during this stage reflect the influence of Michael Madhusudan Dutt, Akshay Kumar Baral and Debendranath Sen, his later poetry illustrates a greater resonance with the poetry of Rabindranath Tagore.

Dutta wrote under multiple pseudonyms, including Nabakumar, Kaviratna, Ashitipar Sharma, Tribikram Varman and Kalamgir.

=== Books of poems ===
- Sabita (The Sun, 1900)
- Sandhiksan (The Opportune Moment, 1905)
- Benu O Bina (The Blaze of the Yagya, 1907)
- Fuler Fasal (The Harvest of Flowers, 1911)
- Kuhu O Keka (Song of Cuckoo and Peahen, 1912)
- Tulir Likhon (Written with a Brush, 1914)
- Abhra-Avir (Farewell Hymn, 1924)
- Kavyasanchayan (Collected Poems, 1930)
- Shishu-Kavita (Children's Poetry, 1945)
- Bhorai (The song of Dawn)
- Tirtha-renu
- Tirtha-Salil

== Other works ==
- Janmaduhkhi (Destined to be sad from Birth - novel, 1912)
- Chiner Dhup (Chinese incense - essays, 1912)
- Rangamalli (play, 1913)
