= Jitin Prasada =

Indian politician (born 1973)

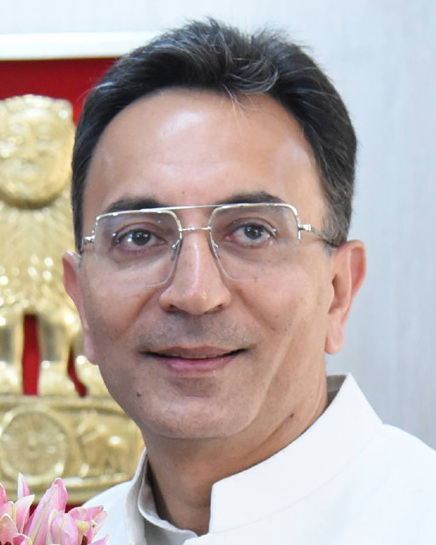
- Prasada in 2024

Union Minister of State
- Incumbent
- Assumed office 10 June 2024
- Minister: Ashwini Vaishnaw; Piyush Goyal
- Ministry & Departments: Electronics & Information Technology; Commerce and Industry
- Preceded by: Rajeev Chandrasekhar; Anupriya Patel

Cabinet Minister in Uttar Pradesh
- In office 25 March 2022 – 11 June 2024
- Ministry & Departments: Public Works
- Chief Minister: Yogi Adityanath
- Preceded by: Keshav Prasad Maurya
- In office 26 September 2021 – 25 March 2022
- Ministry & Departments: Technical Education
- Chief Minister: Yogi Adityanath
- Preceded by: Kamal Rani Varun
- Succeeded by: Ashish Singh Patel

Member of Uttar Pradesh Legislative Council
- In office 1 October 2021 – 11 June 2024
- Constituency: Nominated by Governor

Union Minister of State
- In office 28 October 2012 – 26 May 2014
- Prime Minister: Manmohan Singh
- Minister: M. M. Pallam Raju
- Ministry & Departments: Human Resource Development
- In office 19 January 2011 – 28 October 2012
- Prime Minister: Manmohan Singh
- Minister: C. P. Joshi
- Ministry & Departments: Road Transport and Highways
- In office 28 May 2009 – 19 January 2011
- Prime Minister: Manmohan Singh
- Minister: Murli Deora
- Ministry & Departments: Petroleum and Natural Gas
- In office 6 April 2008 – 22 May 2009
- Prime Minister: Manmohan Singh
- Minister: Ram Vilas Paswan
- Ministry & Departments: Steel

Member of Parliament, Lok Sabha
- Incumbent
- Assumed office 4 June 2024
- Preceded by: Varun Gandhi
- Constituency: Pilibhit, Uttar Pradesh
- In office 2009–2014
- Preceded by: Constituency established
- Succeeded by: Rekha Verma
- Constituency: Dhaurara, Uttar Pradesh
- In office 2004–2009
- Preceded by: Rammurti Singh Verma
- Succeeded by: Mithlesh Kumar
- Constituency: Shahjahanpur, Uttar Pradesh

Personal details
- Born: Kunwar Jitin Prasada; 29 November 1973 (age 52) Shahjahanpur, Uttar Pradesh, India
- Party: Bharatiya Janata Party (since 2021)
- Other political affiliations: Indian National Congress (2001–2021)
- Spouse: Neha Seth (m. 2010)
- Children: 2
- Parent: Jitendra Prasada (father)
- Relatives: Kumari Janhavi Prasada; Tagore family; Kapurthala Royal family
- Education: The Doon School, Dehradun; Sherwood College, Nainital; Shri Ram College of Commerce, Delhi University (B.Com); International Management Institute, New Delhi (M.BA)

Jitin Prasada (born 29 November 1973; Hindi pronunciation: [d͡ʒɪt̪ɪn̪ pɾəsaːd̪(ə)]) is an Indian politician from Uttar Pradesh. He was appointed cabinet minister by the government of Uttar Pradesh on 26 September 2021. Earlier, he has been the former minister of state for Human Resource Department, Government of India. He was representing Dhaurahra (Lok Sabha constituency) of district Lakhimpur Kheri, Uttar Pradesh in 15th Lok Sabha, where he won by 184,509 votes. On 9 June 2021 Jitin Prasad quit the Indian National Congress and joined the Bharatiya Janata Party in the presence of BJP leader Piyush Goyal.

Prasada attended The Doon School, Dehradun at roughly the same time as politicians Rahul Gandhi, Jyotiraditya Scindia, Kalikesh Narayan Singh Deo and Dushyant Singh.

== Early life ==
Prasada was born in Shahjahanpur, Uttar Pradesh to politician Jitendra Prasada and his wife Kanta Prasada. He belongs to Brahmin caste. He attended the all-boys' boarding school, The Doon School in Dehradun (where he was a contemporary of politicians Jyotiraditya Scindia and Kalikesh Narayan Singh Deo). He did a degree in commerce from the Shri Ram College of Commerce, Delhi University and then completed his MBA from International Management Institute, New Delhi.

His grandfather Jyoti Prasad was a Congress party member and served legislative and local body positions. His grandmother Pamela Prasada belonged to the Sikh family of Kapurthala. His great grandfather Jwala Prasada was an Imperial Civil Service officer and great grandmother Purnima Devi, youngest daughter of Hemendranath Tagore brother of Nobel Laureate Rabindranath Tagore.

== Political career ==
In 2001, Jitin Prasad started his career with Indian Youth Congress as a general secretary. In 2004, he won his first election and was elected Member of the Parliament in the 14th Lok Sabha from his hometown constituency of Shahjahanpur, U.P.

In his first tenure as Member of the Parliament Jitin Prasad was inducted as Minister of State for Steel and was one of the youngest ministers in the Cabinet (April 2008). In 2009, he fought and won the election from Dhaurara, as his home bastion Shahjahanpur came under the delimitation process.

His promise of getting the Meter gauge railway track of the district Lakhimpur Kheri converted to Broad gauge gathered major support for his candidature during 2009 Parliamentary elections. He has laid down foundation stone of a Steel factory in his constituency Dhaurahra (Lok Sabha constituency) during his tenure as Union minister of state for Steel in 2008. For the 14th Lok Sabha, Jitin held the positions of Committee on Petitions (Member); Committee on Information Technology and Communications (Member); Consultative Committee, Ministry of Civil Aviation and the Ministry of Steel.

He was appointed In-Charge for West Bengal for Congress, ahead of 2021.

Prasad joined the Bharatiya Janata Party on 9 June 2021. Jitin Prasad won Pilibhit Lok Sabha constituency in 2024 Indian general election with total votes 607,158, which was 52.3% of total votes polled.

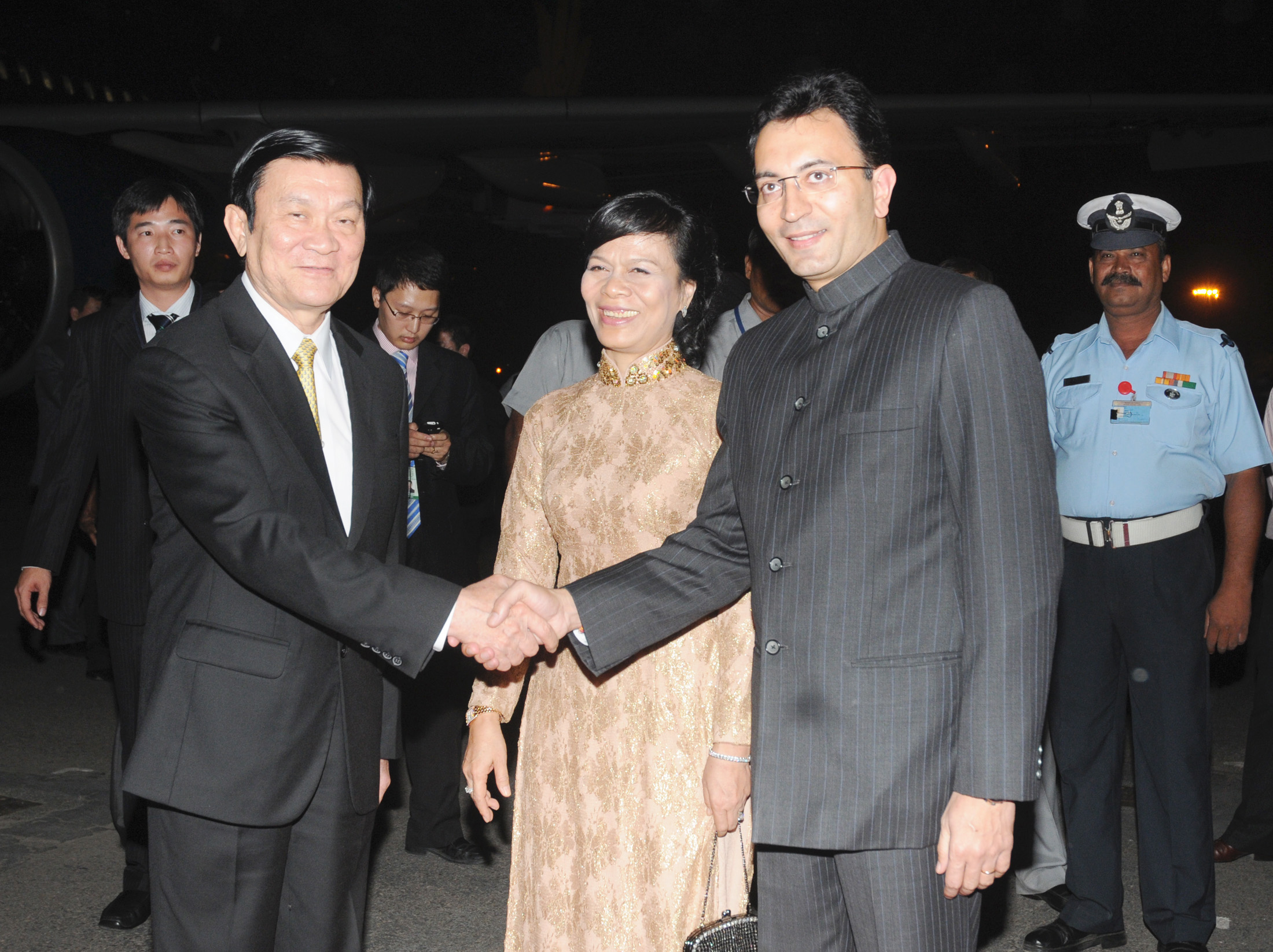
The President of Vietnam, Mr. Truong Tan Sang received by the Minister of State for Road Transport and Highways, Shri Jitin Prasada, at Palam Air Force Station, in New Delhi on 11 October 2011.

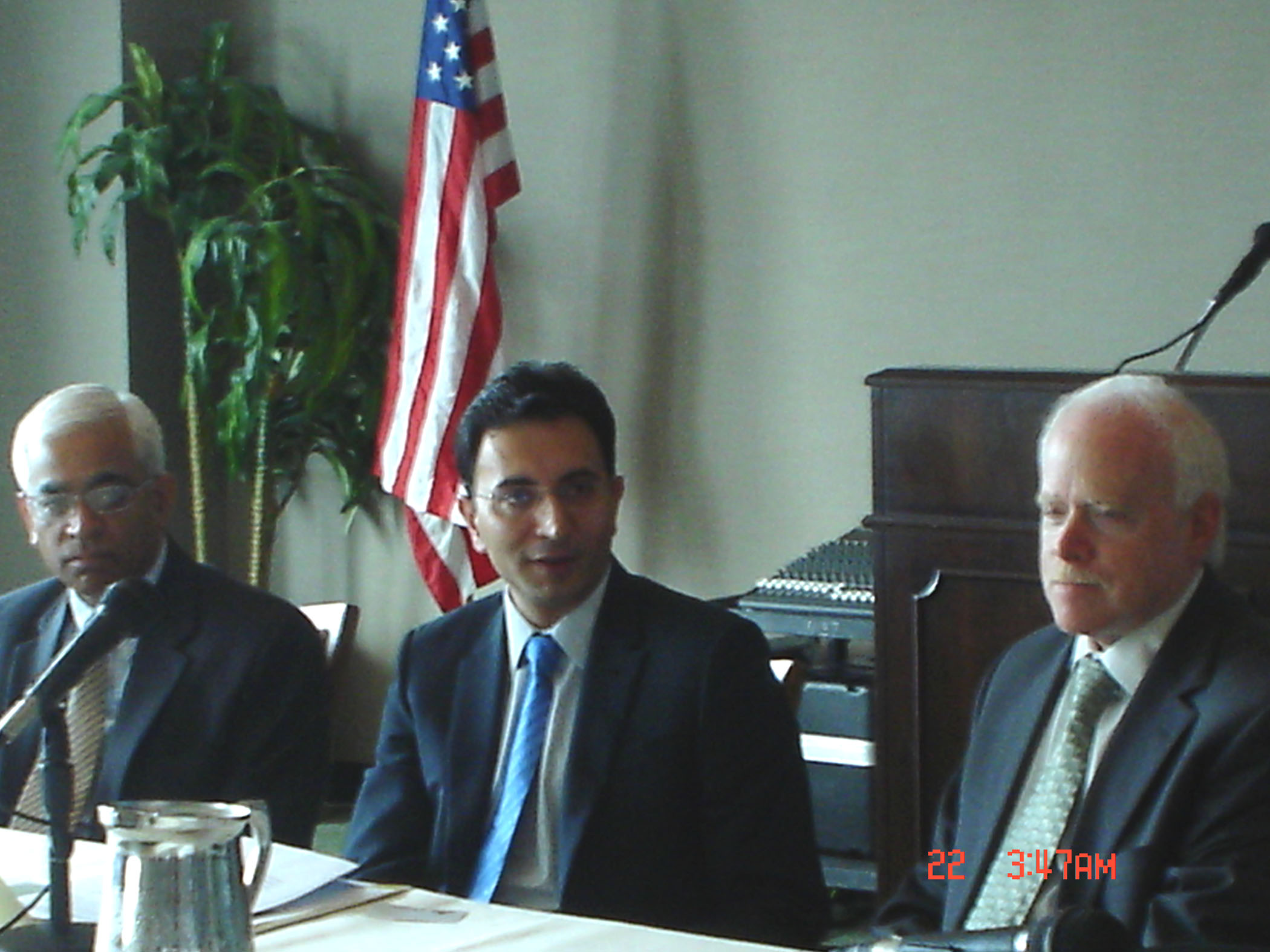
The Minister of State of Petroleum and Natural Gas, Shri Jitin Prasad Chairing an Investors' Roundtable, on the occasion of NELP-VIII and CBM-IV Road Show, at Houston, USA on 21 August 2009.

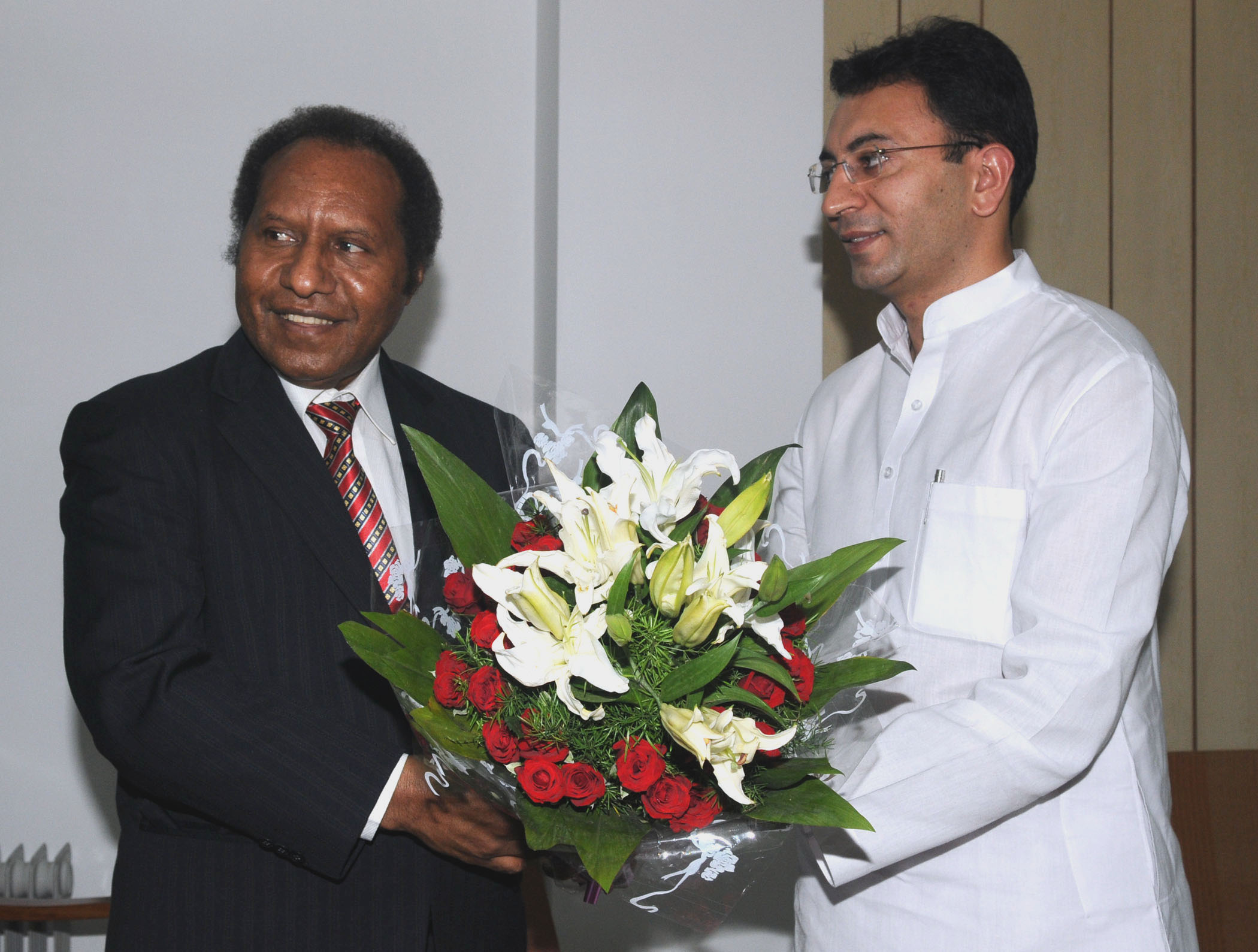
The Minister of Foreign Affairs, Trade and Immigration, Papua New Guinea, Mr. Samuel T. Abal meeting the Minister of State of Petroleum and Natural Gas, Shri Jitin Prasad, in New Delhi on 24 July 2009.

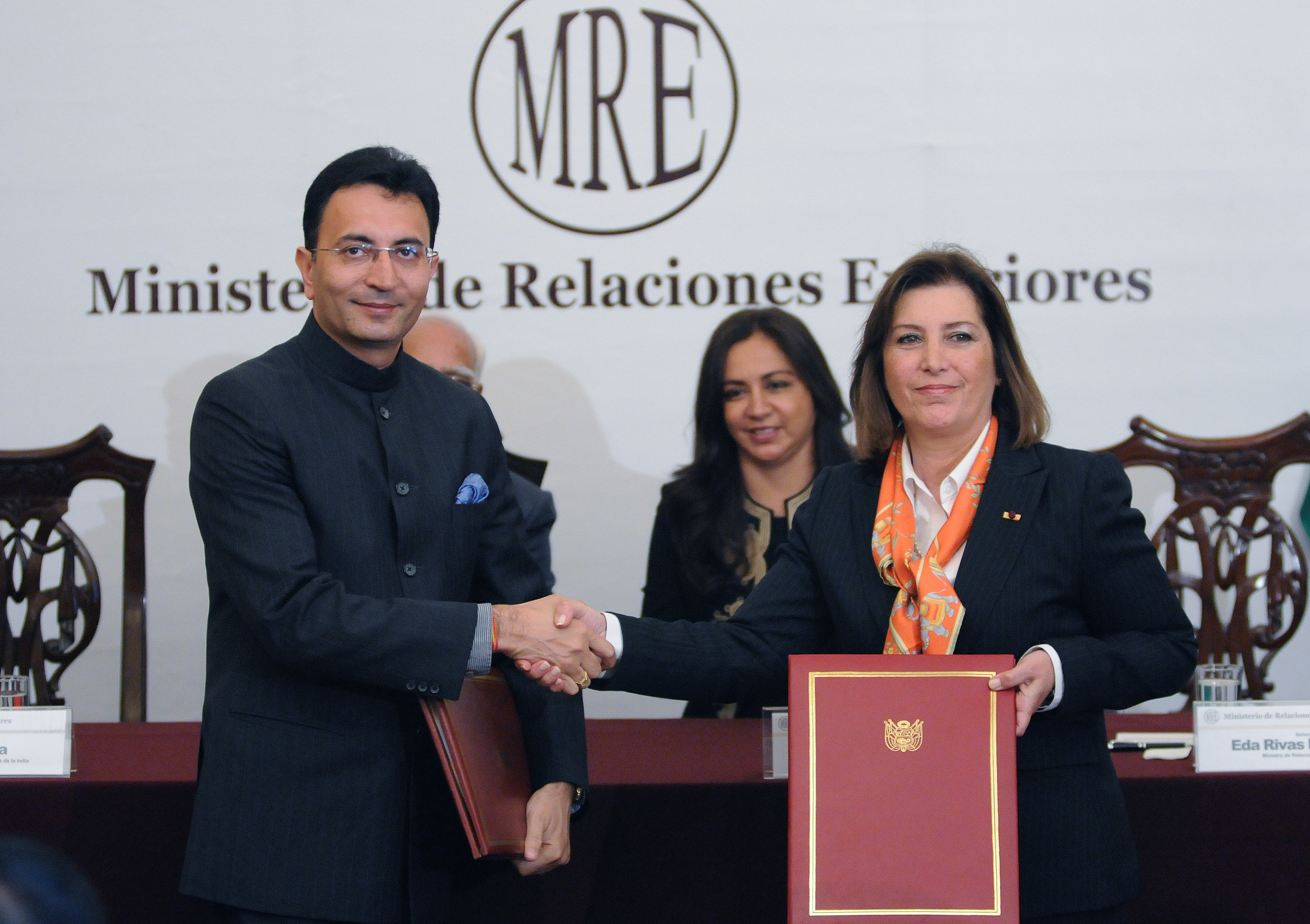
Jitin Prasada during the joint declaration between Peru and India on the occasion of the official visit of the Vice President of India, Mohammad Hamid Ansari.

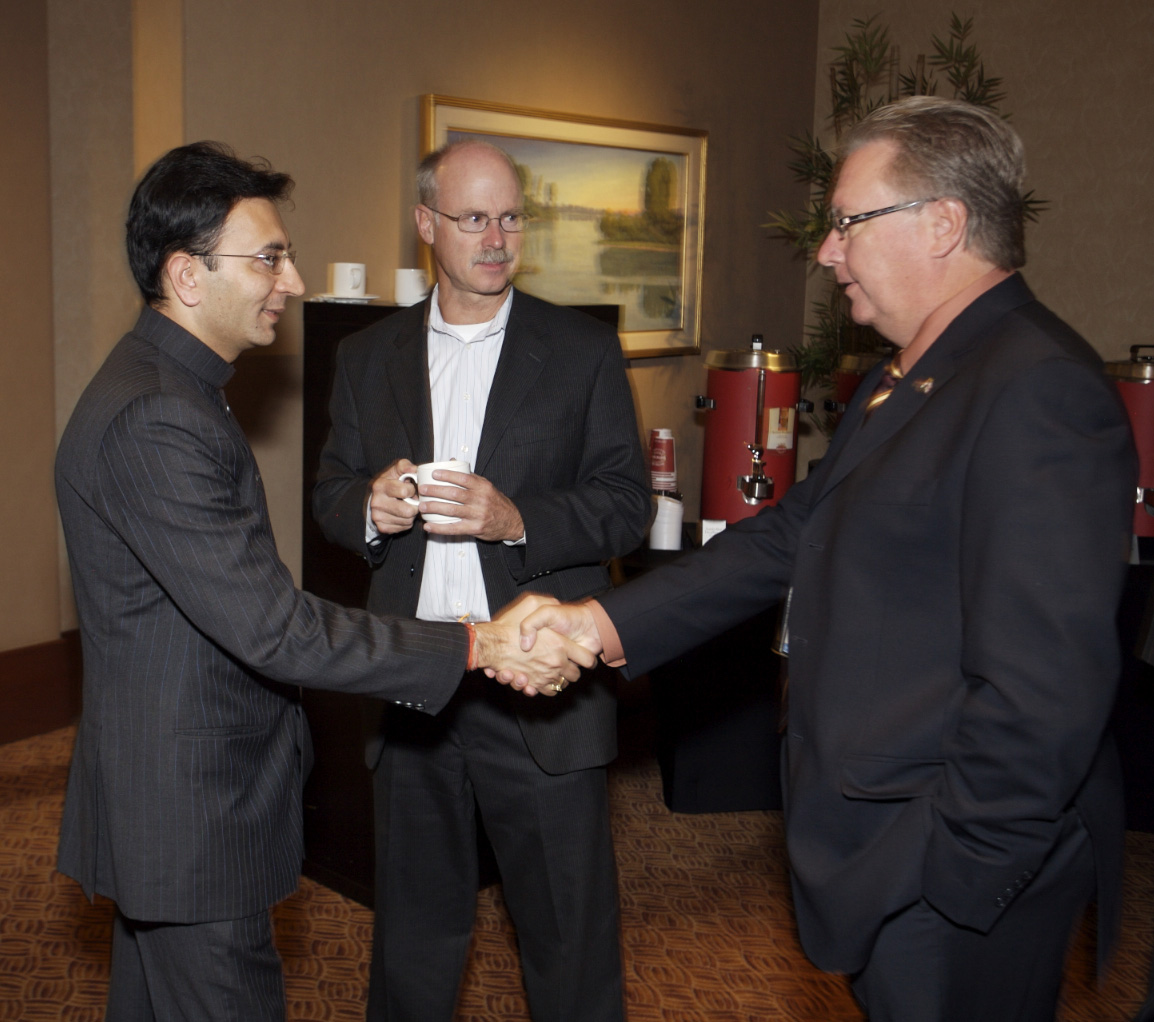
The Minister of State of Petroleum and Natural Gas, Shri Jitin Prasad at the Third Road Show to promote NELP-VIII and CBM IV Blocks, in Calgary, Canada on 24 August 2009.

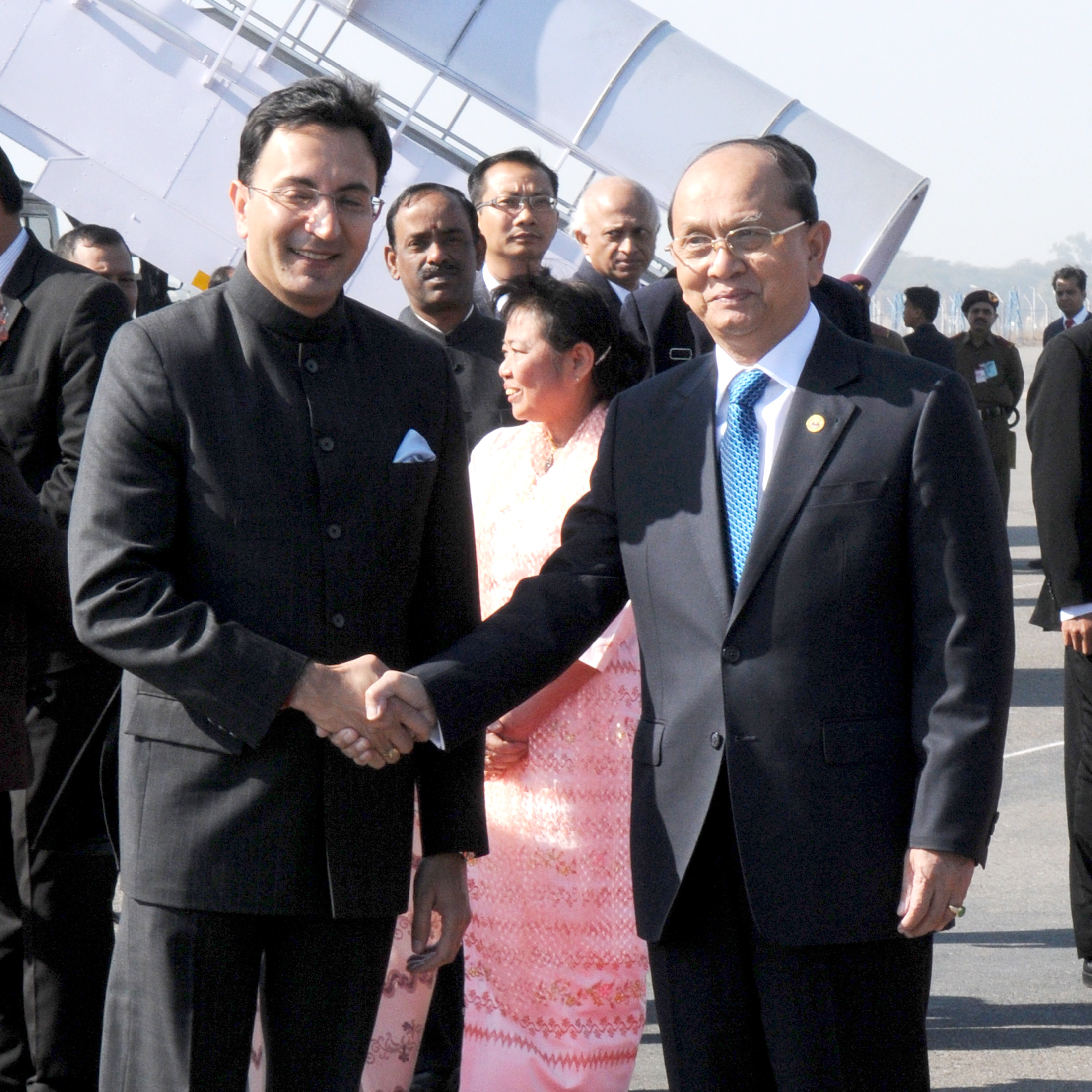
The President of Myanmar, Mr. Tien Sein being received by the Minister of State for Human Resource Development, Shri Jitin Prasada, on his arrival at the Air Force Station, Palam, in New Delhi on 20 December 2012.

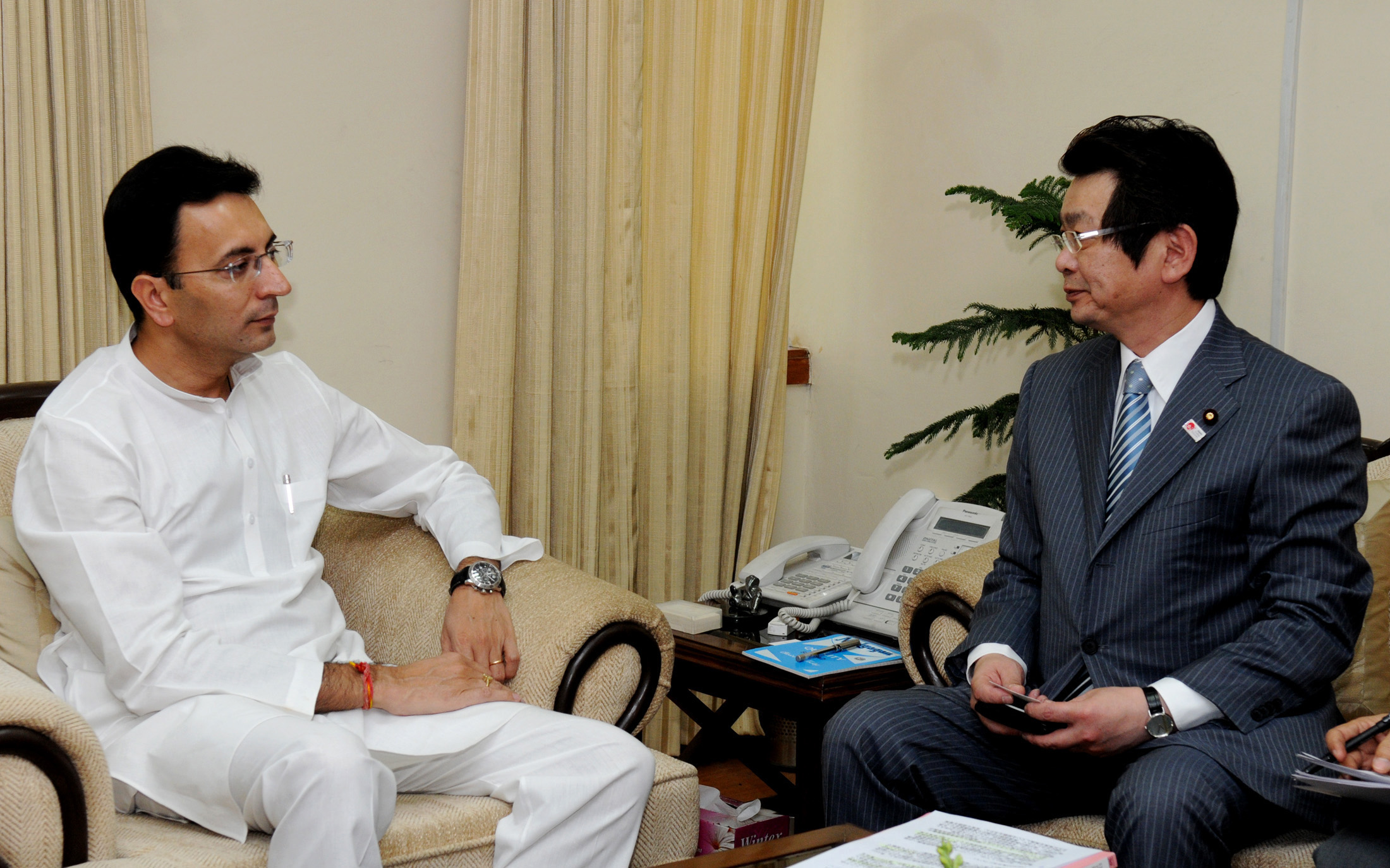
The Minister of Works of Japan, Mr. Ken Okuda meeting the Minister of State for Road Transport and Highways, Shri Jitin Prasada, in New Delhi on 1 May 2012.

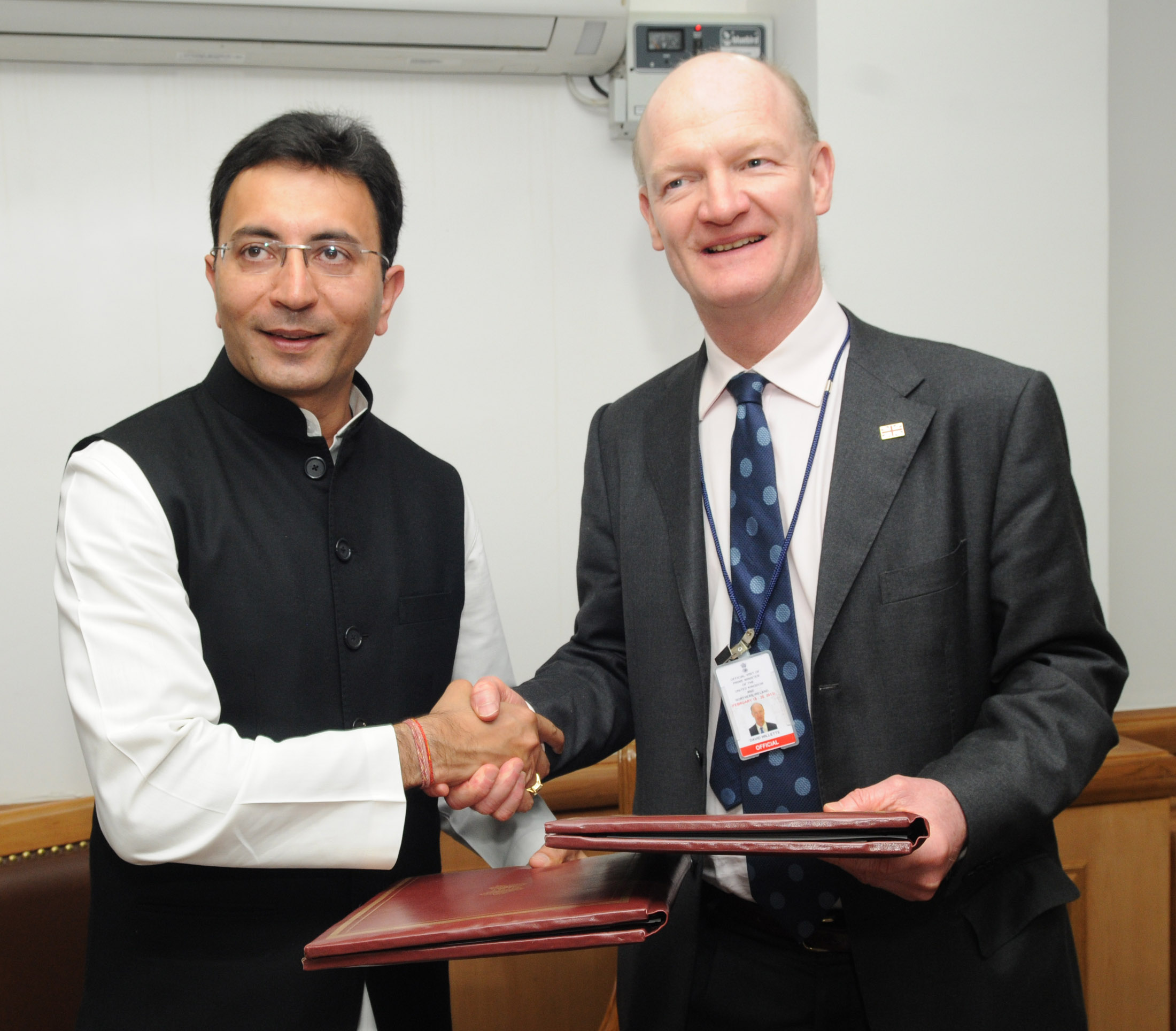
Jitin Prasada and the Minister of Universities and Science, UK, Mr. David Willetts, exchanging the signed documents of the Indo-UK MoU on HRD, in New Delhi on 20 February 2013.

== Electoral performance ==
Year	Election	Party	Constituency name	Result	Votes gained	Vote share%
2004	14th Lok Sabha	Indian National Congress	Shahjahanpur	Won	220,763	34.82%
2009	15th Lok Sabha	Indian National Congress	Dhaurahra	Won	391,391	51.5%
2014	16th Lok Sabha	Indian National Congress	Dhaurahra	Lost	1,70,994	16.13%
2017	17th U.P. Assembly	Indian National Congress	Tilhar	Lost	76,065	37.24%
2021	U.P. Legislative Council	Bharatiya Janata Party	—N/a	Nominated	—N/a	—N/a
2024	18th Lok Sabha	Bharatiya Janata Party	Pilibhit	Won	607,158	52.30%

(Source: Election Commission of India)

== Social Work ==
Jitin Prasada is permanent trustee of NGO Srijan Jitendra Prasada Foundation and NGO Children Of Gandhi Foundation.
