= Tattwabodhini Patrika =

Indian newspaper established by Devendranath Tagore in 1843

Tattwabodhini Patrika তত্ত্ববোধিনী পত্রিকা
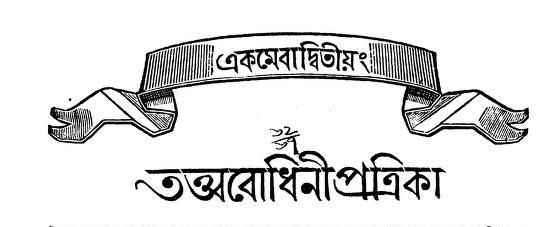
- Type: Weekly newspaper
- Editor: Debendranath Tagore; Ishwar Chandra Vidyasagar; Akshay Kumar Datta; Rajnarayan Basu; Rajendralal Mitra
- Founded: 1843
- Language: Bengali
- Ceased publication: 1883
- Headquarters: Kolkata, Bengal, British India

Tattwabodhini Patrika (/ˌtætwəboʊˈdiːni/; Bengali: তত্ত্ববোধিনী পত্রিকা; lit. 'truth-seeking newspaper') was established by Debendranath Tagore on 16 August 1843, as a journal of the Tattwabodhini Sabha, and continued publication until 1883. It was published from Calcutta (now Kolkata), India. Its editorial board included Debendranath Tagore, Ishwar Chandra Vidyasagar, Akshay Kumar Dutta, Rajnarayan Basu, Rajendralal Mitra and Dwijendranath Tagore.

== See also ==
- Sulabh Samachar
