= Shobhanasundari Mukhopadhyay =

Indian folktale writer (1877–1937)

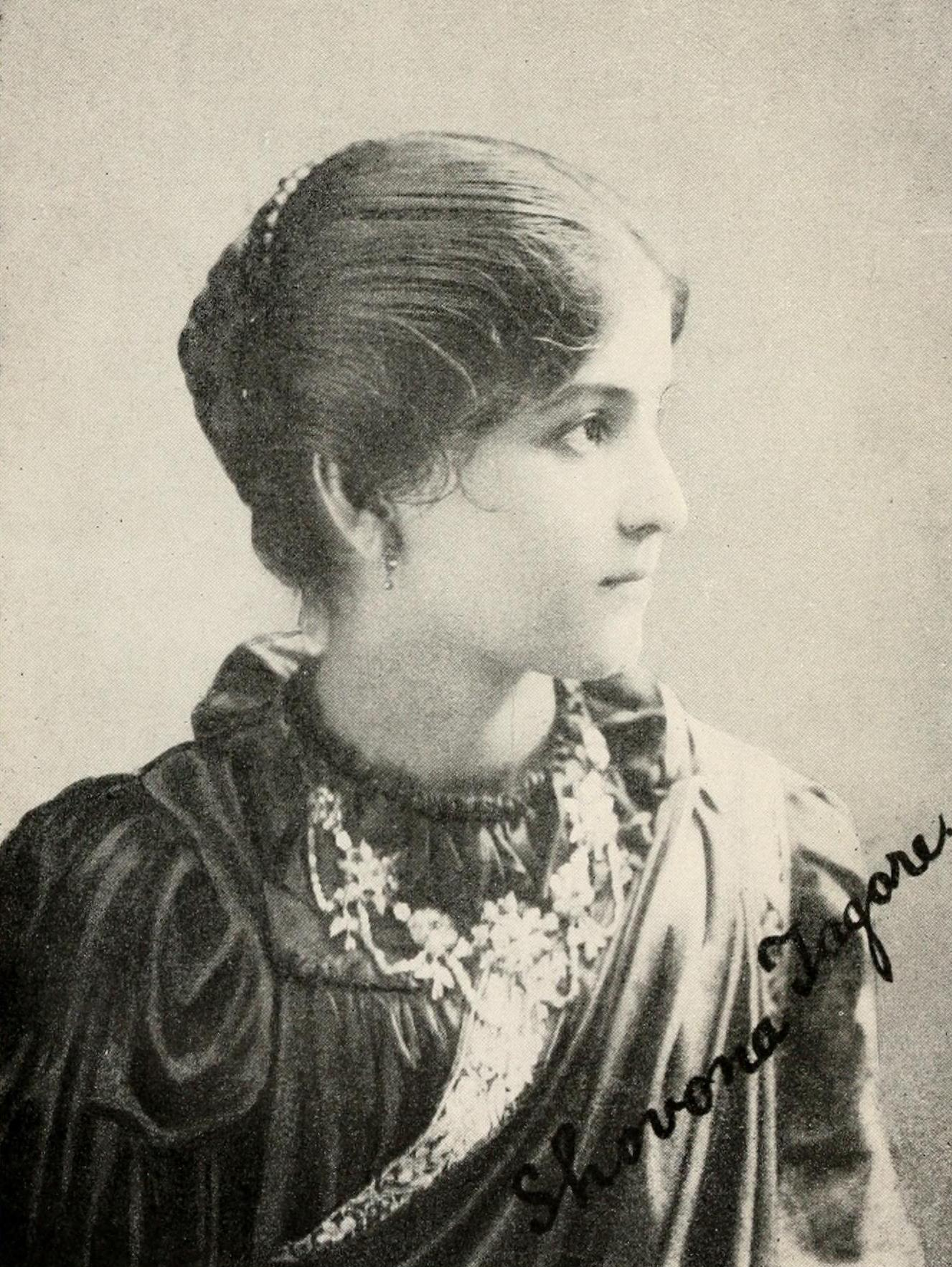
- Shovona Devi, 1915
- Born: 1877; Calcutta, British India
- Died: 1937 (aged 59–60); Howrah, British India
- Other names: Shovona Devi, Shovona Tagore, Shovana Devi, Shovana Tagore
- Father: Hemendranath Tagore
- Relatives: Niece of Rabindranath Tagore

Shobhanasundari Mukhopadhyay (born Shovona Devi Tagore in 1877 in Calcutta; died 26 May 1937, in Howrah) was an Indian writer, known for her collections of folktales. She was the daughter of Hemendranath Tagore and the niece of writer Rabindranath Tagore.

== Biography ==
The fifth daughter of Hemendranath Tagore, Shovona Devi Tagore was raised in an upper-class, English-educated Hindu family in Calcutta (Kolkata). She married Nagendranath Mukhopadhyay, who was an English professor in Jaipur.

She died in 1937 at age sixty of complications relating to high blood pressure.

== Writing ==
One of Mukhopadhyay's first projects was an English translation of her aunt Swarnakumari Devi's Bengali novel Kahake? After this, Mukhopadhyay became interested in recording local oral traditions and folktales.

=== The Orient Pearls (1915) ===
The Orient Pearls: Indian Folklore contains twenty-eight folktales, gathered by Mukhopadhyay herself, some from family servants. Her prefatory note to the book describes her inspiration and process:

The idea of writing these tales occurred to me while reading a volume of short stories by my uncle, Sir Rabindranath Tagore; but as I have none of his inventive genius, I set about collecting folk-tales and putting them into an English garb; and the tales contained in the following pages were told to me by various illiterate village folks, and not a few by a blind man still in my service, with a retentive memory, and a great capacity for telling a story.

The Orient Pearls was reviewed in publications such as The Dial and The Spectator and appeared in libraries around the world shortly after its publication. The book brought Bengali folktales to the attention of English-speaking folklorists around the world, who used it as a source in their comparative work, including new forms of computer-aided study. Her stories have been republished in recent academic collections of the writings of Indian women.

Some scholars have positioned Mukhopadhyay's work as similar in method and tone to British colonial ethnography. Others describe its similarity to other Victorian short story collections produced in India and elsewhere, filled with subtle ideas about social reform, or as demonstrative of the complex sociopolitical circumstances of translating folktales into the colonizer's language. Others view her interest in local culture as a precursor to Indian nationalism. Another scholar argues that Tagore's preface acknowledges the constrained position of a female author.

=== Later works ===
Mukhopadhyay published four books on Indian folklore, religion, culture, and myths for the London-based publishing firm Macmillan between 1915 and 1920. In Indian Fables and Folk-lore (1919) and The Tales of the Gods of India (1920), she includes information on her source material for the stories, something she had not previously done.

== Works ==
- To Whom? An Indian Love Story (translation of Kahake? by Swarnakumari Devi, her aunt) (1898 or 1910)
- The Orient Pearls: Indian Folktales (1915) (At Wikisource; at Archive.org)
- Indian Nature Myths (1919) (open access at Internet Archive)
- Indian Fables and Folk-lore (1919) (transcription project; open access on HathiTrust; open access on GoogleBooks)
- The Tales of the Gods of India (1920)
