= Sarala Devi Chaudhurani =

Indian educationist and activist (1872–1945)

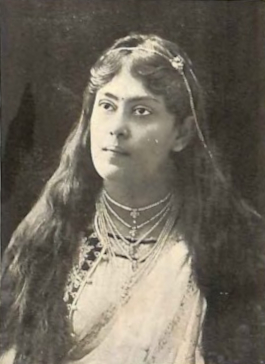
- Sarala Devi Chaudhurani
- Born: Sarala Ghosal; 9 September 1872; Kolkata, Bengal, British India
- Died: 18 August 1945 (aged 72); Kolkata, British India
- Occupations: Educationist, political activist
- Spouse: Rambhuj Dutt Chaudhuri (m. 1905; died 1923)
- Children: Dipak (son)
- Relatives: Swarnakumari Devi (mother); Janakinath Ghosal (father); Debendranath Tagore (maternal grandfather); Rabindranath Tagore (maternal uncle); Indira Devi Chaudhurani (maternal cousin); Surendranath Tagore (maternal cousin)

Sarala Devi Chaudhurani (born Sarala Ghosal; 9 September 1872 – 18 August 1945) was an Indian educationist and political activist, who founded Bharat Stree Mahamandal in Allahabad in 1910. This was the first national-level women's organization in India. One of the primary goals of the organization was to promote female education. The organization opened several offices in Lahore (then part of unpartitioned India), Allahabad, Delhi, Karachi, Amritsar, Hyderabad, Kanpur, Bankura, Hazaribagh, Midnapur, and Kolkata to improve the situation of women all over India.

== Biography ==
=== Early life ===
Sarala was born in Jorasanko, Kolkata on 9 September 1872 to a well known Bengali intellectual family. Her father Janakinath Ghosal was one of the first secretaries of the Bengal Congress. Her mother Swarnakumari Devi, a noted author, was the daughter of Debendranath Tagore, an eminent Brahmo leader and sister of poet Rabindranath Tagore. Her older sister, Hironmoyee, was an author and founder of a widow's home. Sarla Devi's family was a follower of Brahmoism, a religion founded by Ram Mohan Roy and later developed by Sarala's grandfather Debendranath Tagore.

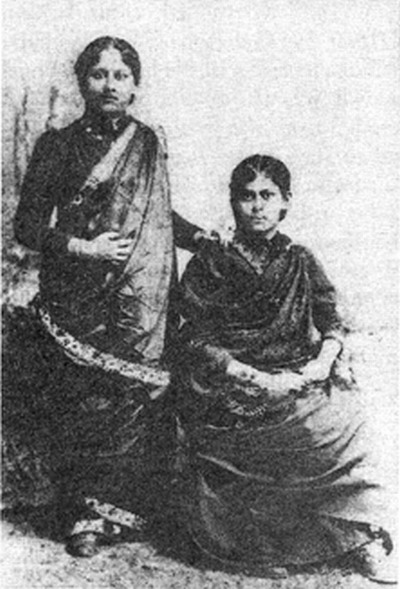
Sarala and her sister Hironmoyee

In 1890, she earned her BA in English literature from Bethune College. She was awarded the college's first Padmavati Gold Medal for being the top female candidate in her BA examinations. She was one of the few women of her time to participate in the Indian independence movement. During anti partition agitation she spread the gospel of nationalism in Punjab and maintained secret revolutionary society.

=== Career ===
Upon completing her education, Sarala went to Mysore State and joined the Maharani Girls' School as a school teacher. A year later, she returned home and started writing for Bharati, a Bengali journal, while also beginning her political activities.

From 1895 to 1899, she edited Bharati jointly with her mother and sister, and then on her own from 1899 to 1907, with the goal of propagating patriotism and to raise up the literary standard of the journal. In 1904, she started the Lakshmi Bhandar (women's store) in Kolkata to popularize native handicrafts produced by women. In 1910, she founded the Bharat Stree Mahamandal (All India Women's Organization), which is regarded by many historians as the first All-Indian organization for women. With several branches around the country, it promoted education and vocational training for women without consideration of class, caste and religion.

=== Personal life ===
In 1905, Sarala Devi married Rambhuj Dutt Chaudhary (1866–1923), a lawyer, journalist, nationalist leader and follower of Arya Samaj, the Hindu reform movement founded by Swami Dayananda Saraswati.

After her marriage, she moved to Punjab. There, she helped her husband edit the nationalist Urdu weekly Hindusthan, which was later converted into an English periodical. When her husband was arrested for his involvement in Non-cooperation movement, Mahatma Gandhi visited her home in Lahore as a guest. Gandhi quoted her poems and writings in his speeches, and in Young India and other journals. In February 1920, Young India published several letters concerned with her membership of Lahore Purdah Club. After Sarala's husband was arrested for his part in Rowlatt satyagraha, Una O'Dwyer (wife of Michael O'Dwyer) wanted her to resign her membership.

She travelled with Gandhi all over India. When apart, they frequently exchanged letters, and mutually admired each other. In one of the letter to Sarala, Gandhi wrote :

You still continue to haunt me even in my sleep. No wonder Panditji calls you the greatest shakti of India. You may have cast that spell over him. You are performing the trick over me now.

Her only son, Dipak, married Gandhi's cousin Maganlal Gandhi's daughter Radha.

=== Later life ===
After her husband's death in 1923, Sarala Devi returned to Kolkata, and resumed editing responsibilities for Bharati from 1924 to 1926. She established a girls' school, Siksha Sadan in Kolkata in 1930. She retired from public life in 1935 and indulged in religion, accepting Bijoy Krishna Chattopadhyaya(1875-1945), of Howrah, also known as Howrah's Thakur (God of Howrah)as her spiritual teacher. She recorded the sermons of her Guru (spiritual teacher) by writing the same when they were orally delivered and such sermons were published in several volumes with the title 'Veda Vani' (Voice of the Vedas). In her autobiography titled 'Jeevaner Jhara Pata', at the end, there is a mention of the name of her spiritual teacher by her as well as by the publisher. <Jibaner Jhara Pata---Autobiography of Sarala Devi Chaudhurani>Also Veda Vani has been mentioned. The name of the spiritual leader mentioned there is Bijoy Krishna Deva Sharma instead of Bijoy Krishna Chattopadhyaya, as 'Deva Sharma' is a common title of the Brahmins. She died on 18 August 1945 in Kolkata.

Her autobiography Jivaner Jhara Pata was serialized in Desh, a Bengali literary magazine, during the later period of her life, in 1942–1943. It was later translated into English by Sikata Banerjee as The Scattered Leaves of My Life (2011).
