= Bharat Stree Mahamandal =

Bharat Stree Mahamandal (The Great Circle of Indian Women) was a national level women's organisation in India founded by Sarala Devi Chaudhurani in Allahabad in 1910. One of the primary goals of the organisation was to promote female education, which at that time was not well developed.

The organization opened several offices in Lahore (then part of undivided India), Delhi, Karachi, Amritsar, Hyderabad, Kanpur, Bankura, Hazaribagh, Midnapur, Prayagraj and Calcutta to improve the situation of women all over India. The organization did not have any British women or men serving on its committee.

== Notable people ==
Notable women associated with Bharat Stree Mahamandal include:

- Kumudini Basu (1873–1942), secretary in Calcutta
- Nazli Begum (1874-1968), member
- Sarala Devi Chaudhurani (1872–1945), founder and secretary
- Sultan Jahan, Begum of Bhopal (1858–1930), member
- Rukmini Lakshmipathi (1892–1951), secretary in Madras
- Cornelia Sorabji (1866–1954), member
