= Kumudini Basu =

Bengali author and reformer (1873–1942)

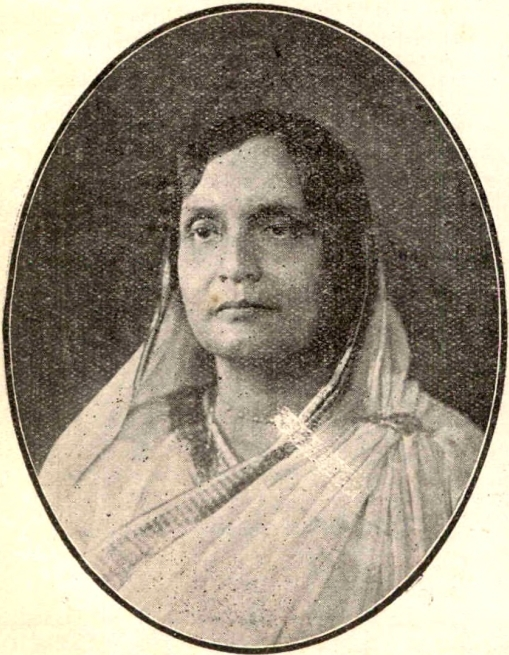
- Born: 1873 Calcutta, West Bengal, India
- Died: 1942 (aged 68–69) Calcutta, West Bengal, India
- Occupation: writer, social reformer, freedom fighter and women's rights activist

Kumudini Basu (née Mitra, 1873–1942) was a Bengali writer, social reformer, freedom fighter and women's rights activist in British India.

== Early and personal life ==
Basu was born in 1873 in Calcutta, West Bengal, India, and was the eldest daughter of the Indian nationalist Krishna Kumar Mitra. She had a sister named Basanti Chakravorty (née Mitra).

Basu married the businessman Sarat Chandra Basu-Mullik.

== Career ==
Basu was educated at the University of Calcutta.

Basu worked as a writer and edited the publications Suprabhat (1907–14), which she also founded, and Bangalakshmi (1925-27). She published several books and poems, including the book Sikher Balidan (The Sacrifice of the Sikh).

Basu participated in the Indian non co-operation movement.

She served as secretary of the Bharat Stree Mahamandal (The Great Circle of Indian Women), which aimed to promote female education. Basu campaigned for women's right to vote and was one of the leaders, along with Kamini Roy and Mrinalini Sen, of the Nigil Bangiya Nari Votadhikar Samiti (All Bengali Women's Franchise Association) which fought for women's suffrage. On 16 August 1925, the Bengal Legislative Council passed a women's franchise resolution by majority vote, granting some Bengali women to exercise their right for the first time in the 1926 Indian general election. In 1935, Basu wrote to the Lothian Committee, also known as the Indian Franchise Committee, to share her views on universal suffrage. She was the first councillor elected in the Municipal Corporation of Calcutta.

Despite her advocacy for women's voting rights, Basu feared that voting might force respectable women to mix with or perhaps be confused with "undesirable women," such as a prostitutes. She proposed that sex workers should register with the police and be forced to use separate polling stations to vote.

Basu also denounced the practice of purdah as one of the principal causes of "spiritual, intellectual, and physical degeneration of both men and women."

== Death ==
She died in 1942 in Calcutta, West Bengal, India.
