= Tattwabodhini Sabha =

Hindu organisation (1839–1859)

The Tattwabodhinī Sabhā (/ˌtætwəboʊˈdiːni/; Bengali: তত্ত্ববোধিনী সভা; lit. 'truth-seeking society') was a group founded in Calcutta in 1839 as a splinter group of the Brahmo Samaj, reformers of Hinduism and Indian Society. The founding member was Debendranath Tagore, previously of the Brahmo Samaj, eldest son of influential entrepreneur Dwarkanath Tagore, and eventually father to renowned polymath Rabindranath Tagore. In 1859, the Tattwabodhinī Sabhā were dissolved back into the Brāhmo Samāj by Debendranath Tagore.

== Tattwabodhini period ==
On 6 October 1839, Debendranath Tagore established Tattvaranjini Sabha which was shortly thereafter renamed the Tattwabodhini ('Truth-seekers') Sabha. Initially confined to immediate members of the Tagore family, in 2 years it mustered over 500 members. In 1840, Debendranath published a Bangla translation of Katha Upanishad. A modern researcher describes the Sabha's philosophy as modern middle-class (bourgeois) Vedanta. Among its first members were the "two giants of Hindu reformation and Bengal Renaissance, Akshay Kumar Datta "who in 1839 emerged from the life of an anonymous squalor-beset individual" and Ishwar Chandra Vidyasagar the "indigenous moderniser".

== First Covenant and merger with the Bramho Samaj ==
On 7th Pous 1765 Shaka (1843) Debendranath Tagore and twenty other Tattwabodhini stalwarts were formally invited by Pt. Vidyabagish into the Trust of Brahmo Sabha. The Pous Mela at Santiniketan starts on this day. From this day forth, the Tattwabodhini Sabha dedicated itself to promoting Ram Mohan Roy's creed. The other Brahmins who swore the First Covenant of Brahmoism are:

- Shridhar Bhattacharya
- Shyamacharan Bhattacharya
- Brajendranath Tagore
- Girindranath Tagore, brother of Debendranath Tagore & father of Ganendranath Tagore
- Anandachandra Bhattacharya
- Taraknath Bhattacharya
- Haradev Chattopadhyaya, the future father-in-law to MahaAcharya Hemendranath Tagore
- Shyamacharan Mukhopadhyaya
- Ramnarayan Chattopadhyaya
- Sashibhushan Mukhopadhyaya

== Disagreement with the Tattwabodhini ==
In Nov 1855 the Rev. Charles Dall (a Unitarian minister of Boston) arrived in Calcutta to start his mission and immediately established contact with Debendranath and other Brahmos. Debendranath's suspicion of foreigners alienated Dall and in 1857, Debendranath Tagore barred the entry of the Reverend from the Sabha premises for preaching the name of Christ who some people worship as God within. Debendranath then proceeded on spiritual retreat to Simla. Dall, immediately formed a counter group "The friends of Rammmohun Roy Society" and then got admitted a protégé to Sabha. The presence of Dall's protégé Keshub Chandra Sen (a non-Brahmin) into the Calcutta Brahmo Sabha in 1857 while Debendranath was away in Simla caused considerable stress in the movement, with many long time Tattvabodhini Brahmin members publicly leaving the Brahmo Sabha and institutions due to his high-handed ways. In September 1858, Debendranath returned to Calcutta to resolve the simmering disputes. but his conservative mien did not allow him to take decisive steps. He proceeded on a sea voyage to Ceylon accompanied by Sen and his 2nd son Satyendranath (a firm admirer of Mr Sen) but no concord was achieved. In 1859, the venerable and beloved Secretary of the Tattwabodhini Sabha Ishwar Chandra Vidyasagar resigned from the Brahmo Sabha in the face of Debendranath's vacillation. A meeting of the Tatwabodhini was promptly summoned with Debendranath resigning from the group he had founded. His third son Hemendranath Tagore then a boy barely 15 years in age, and the favorite pupil of Vidyasgar, was commonly acclaimed as Debendranath's successor to head the Tattwabodhini. In the course of time he would become known as the MahaAcharya (or Great Teacher).

== Objectives and beliefs ==
The main objective of the Sabhā was to promote a more rational and humanist form of Hinduism based on the Vedānta, the Upanishads that form the last part of the Vedās. With increasing missionary presence in Calcutta tending to view the Classical branch of 'Advaida' Vedānta as amoral and renunciatory, the Tattwabodhinī Sabhā aimed to shield themselves and their reformed faith from criticism by distancing themselves from this 'outdated' version.

Debendranath Tagore said in 1843 that "It was to counteract influences like these [missionary] and inculcate on the Hindu religious inquirer's mind doctrines at once consonant to reason and human nature, for which he has to explore his own sacred resources, the Vedānta, that the society was originally established". This focus on rationality and humanity, whilst alleviating Missionary pressure, also allowed the materially wealthy 'bhadralok' members of the society to participate in a spiritual medium which did not condemn worldly concern. The group's writings, particularly the recently rediscovered 'Sabhyadiger Vaktṛtā', display a marked stress upon the role of the 'householder' (gṛhastha) as a religious path, over that of the renouncer or hermit. The Brahman, like the renouncer, must restrain his senses and passions, but only to the extent of not becoming obsessed with, or overcome by, anything in the material world.

Essentially, the Tattwabodhinī Sabhā's humanism is displayed in a profound focus on society and its interrelation. Their view, at least in the early years, was that the world is created by God, and all things within it are pathways to knowledge of Brahman, the Ultimate Self, and the ultimate goal. Similarly, they saw that material wealth, if made and possessed with the correct intention – that of helping society and others – was in fact not only ethically sound, but an utter necessity for harmonious society. Once again, their rationality is evident.
