= Purnima Devi =

- Born: 13 May 1884; Jorasanko, calcutta
- Died: 24 November 1972 (aged 88)

Purnima Devi whose maiden name was Sudakshina Devi (1884–1972), was the youngest child of noted Brahmo Hemendranath Tagore, and niece of Rabindranath Tagore, thus part of the main Tagore family.

She was married to Sir Jwala Prasada, Zamindar of Shahjahanpur and an Imperial Civil Service (ICS) officer. She was later awarded the Kaiser-i-Hind Medal by the British Raj

== Family ==
Her only child, a son, Kunwar Jyoti Prasada, married Rajkumari Pamela Devi of Kapurthala State. They had three children, two sons and one daughter.

Purnima Devi's elder grandson, Jitendra Prasada (deceased), was a Congress politician and member 5th, 7th, 8th, 13th Lok Sabha. His son, Jitin Prasada is currently a Member of Parliament and Minister of State for Commerce & Industry and Electronics & Information Technology.

== Early life and education ==
Smt. Purnima Jwala Prasada was born on 13 May 1884, at No. 6, Dwarkanath Tagore's Lane, Jorasanko, Calcutta to Hemendranath Tagore (1844–1884) of Jorasanko Thakur Bari and elder brother of Rabindranath Tagore, and son of Debendranath Tagore founder of Brahmo Samaj.

Purnima Devi was educated at the Loretto Convent, a school for European Girls at Park Street, Calcutta, as a day scholar and in addition to English she knew Bengali, Sanskrit, Urdu, Hindi, French, Piano and Violin. She passed the Cambridge Trinity College Music Examination.

== Career ==
She was the first Bengali lady married in the United Provinces, her husband being the Sir Jwala Prasada, M.A., Deputy Commissioner of Hardoi, and an officer in the Imperial Civil Services, in 1903. She was the winner of the B. P. R. A. medal for Diana matches for schooling (1911 Meerut).

She was an expert rider going round her villages on horse back and an expert hunter having taken part in big game shooting with her husband. She took a very keen interest in the education and uplift of her sex in India. In memory of her husband she founded 'The Pandit Jwala Prasad Kanya Pathshala' at Shahjahanpur in UP. She helped in the establishment of the Hewett Model Girls' School at Muzaffarnagar, United Provinces, and founded Pardah Clubs at Shahjahanpur and Muzaffarnagar with a view to the improvement of Pardah ladies. Sir Jwala Prasada and Purnima Devi constructed the Prasada Family's primary residence, known as Prasada Bhawan, which is located in Shahjahanpur and is currently occupied by the sons of her younger grandson Kunwar Jayendera Prasada.

She was the owner of several villages in Shahjahanpur District, a beautiful hill property at Nainital (Uttrakhand) called Abbotsford, Prasada Bhawan, a house acquired by the army in 1947 in Badami Bagh, Srinagar, Kashmir now the official residence of the Army Head and a house beach in Jagannath Puri. She is the author of a Hindi publication, "unki bunat ki PrathaiJi Siksha" adopted by the United Provinces Educational Text Book Committee for schools. She was engaged in writing a novel in English under the title of "The Last Lamp out."

She is the holder of a Kaisar-i-Hind medal and was the first Indian lady exempted from the operation of the Arms Act.
