= Jyotirindranath Tagore =

Bengali playwright, musician, editor, and painter (1849–1925)

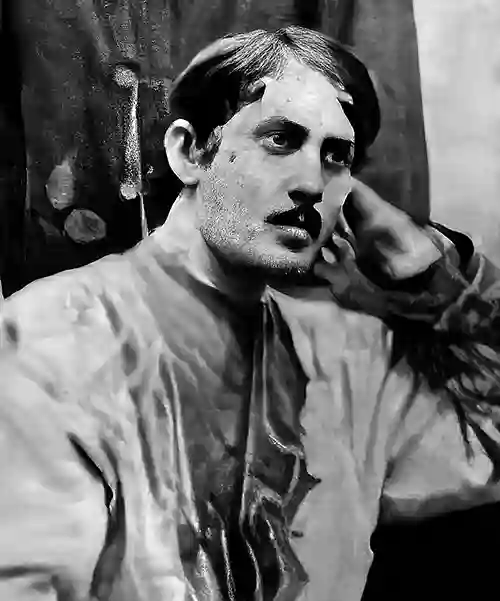
- Jyotirindranath Tagore c.1867
- Born: 4 May 1849; Mechuabazar, Calcutta, Bengal Presidency, British India
- Died: 4 March 1925 (aged 75); Ranchi, Bengal Presidency, British India
- Occupations: Playwright, musician, editor, painter
- Spouse: Kadambari Devi
- Parent(s): Debendranath Tagore; Sarada Sundari Devi
- Relatives: Indira Devi Chaudhurani (niece), Dwijendranath, Satyendranath, Hemendranath, Swarnakumari, Rabindranath Tagore (siblings), +9 others
- Family: Tagore family

Jyotirindranath Tagore (4 May 1849 – 4 March 1925) was a Bengali intellect. Born in the aristocratic Tagore family, he was the elder brother of Rabindranath Tagore. He pioneered romantic historical dramas in Bengal with nationalistic undertones. Among his best known works are Puruvikram (1874), Sarojini (1875) and Svapnamayi (1882).

To promote Bengali language and literature, he established Bidwajjanasamagama, Saraswata Samaj, and the literary magazine Bharati. He was a prolific portraitist and made about 2,000 pencil portraits, most notable among them being the only known sketch of Lalon. In 1914, William Rothenstein, arranged the publication of Twenty-Five Collotypes from the Original Drawings of Jyotirindranath Tagore in England.

A swadeshi activist, he was a vocal supporter of women's rights.

He received his education from Presidency College.

During the new theater movement of the 1860s, Tagore's plays were popular and were frequently staged in Calcutta. Notably, he translated Kalidasa's five-act play Vikramōrvaśīyam.

== Works ==
- Historical plays: Puruvikram (1874), Sarojini (1875), Ashrumati (Woman in tears, 1879), Swapnamayi (Lady of Dream, 1882).
- Satirical plays: Kinchit Jalajog (Some Refreshments, 1873), Eman Karma Ar Korbo Na (I will never do such a thing again 1877), Hathath Nabab (Suddenly Rich, 1884), Alik Babu (Strange Man, 1900).
- Translations: Kalidas's Abhijñānaśākuntalam (The Recognition of Shakuntala) and Malati Madhava (Malati and Madhava); Sudrak's Mrichhatika (Little Clay Cart); Marcus Aurelius' Meditations, Shakespeare's Julius Caesar; Bal Gangadhar Tilak's Gita Rahasya.
