= Jitendra Prasada =

Indian politician

Vice President, All India Congress Committee
- In office 1999–2001
- President: Sonia Gandhi
- Succeeded by: Rahul Gandhi

Member of 5th, 7th, 8th, 13th Lok Sabha
- Constituency: Shahjahanpur

Personal details
- Born: 12 November 1938 Shahjahanpur, United Provinces, British India (present day Uttar Pradesh, India)
- Died: 16 January 2001 (aged 62) New Delhi, India
- Party: Indian National Congress
- Spouse: Kanta Prasada
- Children: 2 (incl. Jitin Prasada)
- Parents: Kunwar Jyoti Prasada (father); Pamela Devi (mother)
- As of 9 March, 2009

Jitendra Prasada (12 November 1938 – 16 January 2001) was an Indian politician and a former vice-president of the Indian National Congress. He was also the political advisor to two prime ministers of India, Rajiv Gandhi in 1991 and P. V. Narasimha Rao in 1994.

Prasad fought Congress Party's presidential election against Sonia Gandhi on 9 November 2000 but was defeated. He died on 16 January 2001 in New Delhi following a cerebral haemorrhage.

== Personal life ==
Jitendra Prasada was born to Kunwar Jyoti Prasada and Pamela Devi at Shahjahanpur on 12 November 1938. His grandmother Purnima Devi was the niece of Rabindranath Tagore and mother Pamela Devi belonged to the royal family of Kapurthala State.

He was educated at Sam Higginbottom Institute of Agriculture, Technology and Sciences. Other institutes include Sherwood College, Nainital, Colvin Taluqdars College, Lucknow. He married Kanta Prasada on 27 January 1973. This couple has son, Jitin Prasada and a daughter, Jahnavi Prasada. The family of Jitendra Prasada resides at Prasad Bhawan, Shahjahanpur.

== Political career ==
Prasad entered politics as a member of Uttar Pradesh Vidhan Parishad in 1970. He was elected to the 5th Lok Sabha in 1971 from Shahjahanpur constituency. He was re-elected to the Lok Sabha in 1980 and 1984 from the same constituency. He was a member of the Rajya Sabha from 1994 to 1999. He was again elected to the 13th Lok Sabha in 1999 from Shahjahanpur constituency.

=== Posts held ===
- President, Uttar Pradesh Congress Committee since 5 January 1995
- Vice-president, AICC, June 1997 to April 1998
- Chairman, Co-operative Bank, Shahjahanpur
- Vice-chairman, Jawaharlal Nehru Centenary Celebration Committee
- Cabinet Secretariat; General Secretary, AICC, 1985
- Political Secretary to Rajiv Gandhi, (Congress President)
- Political Secretary to P.V. Narasimha Rao, (Congress President)
- Member, Indian delegation to the United Nations General Assembly, 1983
- Member, Congress Working Committee, 1992 and 1997
- Member, Estimates Committee, 1980–82
- Member, Committee of Privileges, 1994–96
- Member, Committee on Home Affairs, 1995–97
- Member, Committee on Commerce
- Member, Committee on Public Undertakings
- Member, Consultative Committee for the Ministry of Commerce
