= Akshay Kumar Datta =

Bengali writer

- অক্ষয় কুমার দত্ত
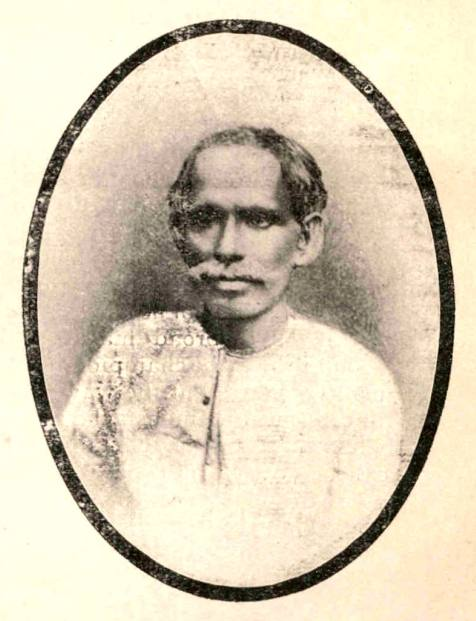
- Born: Akshay Kumar Datta; 15 July 1820; Chupi, Burdwan, British India (now in Purba Bardhaman, West Bengal, India)
- Died: 18 May 1886 (aged 65); Bally, British India
- Occupation: Writer

Akshay Kumar Datta (also spelt: Akshay Kumar Dutta) (Bengali: অক্ষয় কুমার দত্ত) (15 July 1820 – 18 May 1886) was a Bengali writer from India. He was one of the initiators of the Bengal Renaissance.

== Early life ==
He was born as the son of Pitamber Dutta in Chupi village of Burdwan district (now Purba Bardhaman district) of Bengal Presidency, British India.

== Activism ==
He left his mark on the history of Bengali prose literature and the Brahmo movement in the mid-nineteenth century, inspired by uninterrupted scientific rationalism; a member of the Tattvabodhini Sabha established by Devendranath Tagore and, for some time, he served as the assistant editor of its paper, Tattvabodhini Patrika. On 13 June 1840, when Debendranath established the Tattvabodhini Pathshala in Calcutta, Akshay Kumar became its teacher. Akshay Kumar was one of the leaders in the Brahmo Samaj who raised questions against this kind of blind scriptural belief.

In 1854, an institution “Samjjyoti bidhayini Sahrit Samiti” was formed mainly for the purpose of eradication of superstition and social welfare. First Debendranath Tagore and then Akshay Kumar Dutt were elected its president and editor respectively. The objectives of this organisation included introduction of women's education, introduction of remarriage of Hindu widows, abolition of child marriage and prevention of polygamy. He joined hand with Debendranath regarding against the forcible conversion of Hindus to Christianity by the Christian clergy. He wrote on the page of Tattvabodhini against the oppression of the Nilakars and the cruel oppression of the zamindars. There were mainly two features of the thought process of Brahmo Samaj. One is devotionalism, the other is rationalism. Akshay Kumar has mainly highlighted this rational aspect of Rammahan's life philosophy.

== Works ==
In his books Judgment on the Relation of Human Nature to Exterior (Part I, 1851 AD; Part II, 1853 AD) and Religion (1856 AD), he has given a very systematic and rational discussion. Although the first book is based on George Coomb's book, Constitution of Man, it is not an exact translation. The second book is based on various English texts. The terminology he has created in Bengal using the English word in the first text is intriguing and valuable in terms of the construction of public and private terminology at the present time. His Charupath (Part I, 1853 AD; Part II, 1854 AD; Part III, 1859 AD) brought an epoch in the field of early childhood education.

His most famous work is the Indian Scholarly Worship (Part I, 160 AD; Part II, 163 AD). This is the first successful attempt to write such a book in Bengali. Although the book is based primarily on Horace Heyman Wilson's Sketch of the Religious Sects of the Hindus, published in the sixteenth and seventeenth volumes of Asiatic Research, it also contains much of Akshay Kumar's basic research. The Voyage and Trade Expansion of His Ancient Hindus (published in 1901 after the death of the author and edited by his son Rajininath Dutt) is one such basic research book.

His other books include the Lecture of the Third Annual Meeting in Memory of Mr. David Hare (1845 AD); Advice to Steam Riders (1855 AD); Notable are the proposals for the development of religion (1855 AD) and the study of physics (1856 AD).

== Family ==
The renowned Bengali poet Satyendranath Dutta was the grandson of Akshay Kumar Dutta.
