= Hemendranath Tagore =

Indian Brahmo (1844–1884)

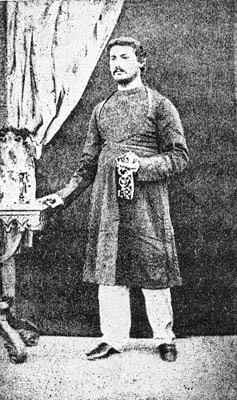
- Born: 1844; Calcutta, Bengal Presidency, British India (now Kolkata, India)
- Died: 1884 (aged 39–40); Calcutta, Bengal Presidency, British India
- Occupation: Author
- Parents: Debendranath Tagore (father); Sarada Sundari Devi (mother)
- Relatives: Indira Devi Chaudhurani (niece), Dwijendranath, Satyendranath, Jyotirindranath, Swarnakumari, Rabindranath Tagore (siblings) +9 others
- Family: Tagore family

Hemendranath Tagore (1844–1884) was Debendranath Tagore's third son, who is notable for being the first Brahmo as the first child born in 1844 to any of the original 21 Brahmos who swore the First Brahmo Covenant on 21 December 1843 at Calcutta (now Kolkata). An intensely private person, he was also well known as the strict disciplinarian entrusted with the responsibility of looking after the education of his younger brothers in addition to being administrator for his large family estates.

He was also the constant spiritual companion to his father Debendranath Tagore who founded Brahmoism and, despite his youth, he acted as the mediator between his father and the seniors of the Tattwabodhini Sabha. At the time of the First Brahmo Schism of 1865, he was responsible for expelling the non-Brahmin workers from the Calcutta Brahmo Samaj. The Adi Dharm religion is founded exclusively on his philosophy and is today the largest development from Brahmoism with over 8 million adherents in India alone.

== Early Life and Contributions ==
Much like his siblings he had wide interests in various fields and can be regarded as a polymath and 'the scientist of the family'. He attended the Calcutta Medical College and wrote articles on physical science which he planned to compile and edit into a textbook for school students. If his premature death had not prevented him from completing the project, this would have been the first science textbook in Bengali.

From 1867, Hemendranath Thakur began conducting his first experiments into radio waves and electromagnetic propagations. Between 1872 and 1873, he wrote several articles on the results of his researches, these were transcribed by another Brahmin Ramendra Sundar Trivedi. In 1874, he compiled the first scholarly Asian work on physics entitled Prakritik Vijnaner Sthulamarma which was updated in 1878–79. Since the knowledge contained within was potentially explosive its circulation was restricted only to Brahmins of the Adi Brahmo Samaj. Later all works of Hemendranath Tagore and his grandfather Dwarkanath Tagore in the records of Adi Brahmo Samaj were destroyed.

He was known for his extraordinary physical strength and prowess in wrestling contests – described as being a "renowned wrestler", as also his expertise in martial arts like judo and ninjitsu. He was also an adept of ancient Raja Yoga at the highest levels with control over Time and Space. Exceptionally modern for the time, he insisted on formal education for his three sons and all of his daughters. He not only put them through school but trained them in music, arts and European languages such as French and German. It was another mark of his forward looking mentality that he actively sought out eligible grooms from different provinces of India for his daughters and married them off in places as far away as UP and Assam. A staunch modernist, he instituted various financial trusts for the womenfolk of Tagore family (especially his sisters) and was responsible for settling the Shantiniketan estate near Bolpur which later evolved into Visva Bharati.

A practical and scientific humanist, he was deeply loved by the peasants of his estates in Bengal.

== Hemendranath and Tattwabodhini ==
A series of developments in Tattwabodhini Sabha after its merger in 1843 with Calcutta Brahmo Samaj resulted in a select Brahmin group of the Tattwabodhini forming a reformist core which stood apart from Calcutta Brahmo Samaj during the fractious period of 1858 to 1865 to later emerge as Adi Dharm. This core was initially under Ishwar Chandra Vidyasagar who later entrusted it to Hemendranath in 1859. Finally in 1865 Hemendranath took charge for firmly insisting on the expulsion of non-Brahmins from preaching posts in the religion. He thereafter organised researches in the formal practices, rituals and observances for Brahmo adherents which were privately circulated in early 1860 as Brahmo Anusthan. This Anusthan was limited for the Brahmin families of the 1843 First Covenant only and was first used publicly on 26 July 1861 for the marriage of his second sister Sukumari. The Anusthan involving discarding the sacred Brahmin thread created considerable controversy and was thereafter adopted for the non-Brahmins also with some small modifications who possessed no thread.

== Vision of Brahma ==
Description of vision of Brahma in 1848:

Then I went out and sat underneath an ashvatta tree and according to the teaching of the saints began meditating on the Spirit of God dwelling within my soul. My mind was flooded with emotion, my eyes were filled with tears. All at once I saw the shining vision of Brahma in the lotus core of my heart. A thrill passed through my whole body, I felt a joy beyond all measure. But the next moment I could see Him no more. On losing sight of that beatific vision which destroys all sorrow, I suddenly rose from the ground. A great sadness came over my spirit. Then I tried to see Him again by force of contemplation, and found Him not. I became as one stricken with disease and would not be comforted. Meanwhile I suddenly heard a voice in the air, 'In this life thou shalt see Me no more. Those whose hearts have not been purified, who have not achieved the highest Yoga, cannot see Me. It was only to stimulate thy love that I once appeared before thee'

== Children ==
Hitendranath (son), Kshitindranath (son), Ritendranath (son) Pratibha (daughter), Pragna (daughter), Abhi (daughter), Manisha (daughter), Shovana (daughter), Sushama (daughter) Sunrita (daughter), Sudakshina (daughter)

Kshitindranath was well known as official Historian of Adi Brahmo Samaj and editor of the Tattwabodhini journal, a duty carried on by grandson Commander Amritamoyi Mukherjee I.N. He tirelessly strove to unearth the Tagore family records which were missing since the days of Debendranath who had redistributed the entire property and in the process had denied legitimate shares to the families of the other scions of the Tagore family.

Pratibha Debi married Ashutosh Chaudhuri. Their son Arya Chaudhuri studied architecture in England.

Pragnasundari Debi married the most famous Assam author Sahityarathi Lakshminath Bezbaroa (1864–1938) (whose father was the physician to the last Kings of Assam). "The inventive genius of Bezbarua who was an intellectual of the highest order and a humorist of considerable power ... his song O Mur Apunar Dex is the most popular Assamese patriotic song of all time" and the de facto anthem of Assam. Prajnasundari Debi (née Tagore) was a literary phenomenon in her own right, her cookbook Aamish O Niramish Ahar (1900, reprinted 1995) was a standard given to every Bengali bride with her trousseau, and earning her the appellation "India's Mrs Beeton". From 1897 to 1902 Prajnasundari was the editor of the periodical Punya, at first started as the in-house publication of Thakur-bari. Containing fiction, poetry and domestic science an cooking, it was later edited by Hitendranath and Rithendranath Tagore.

Manisha Debi married D.N. Chatterjee a famous surgeon of Calcutta educated in Edinburgh, who later settled in Assam. Their daughter Dipty Chaudhuri married into the family of Pandit Navin Chandra Ray the famous Adi Dharm social reformer of Punjab. Sushama Devi married to barrister Darikanath Mukherjee, they had four sons and two daughters:- Elder son (became sanyasi), Lokendranath Mukherjee (never married) was a freedom fighter, third son (became sanyasi), Dr. Bharganath Mukherjee married to Gauri Devi, daughter Bharati married to Janak Prokash Gangooly (son of artist Jamini Prokash Gangooly), daughter (expired in childhood), Bhaskarnath Mukherjee married to Usha Devi.

Hemendranath's youngest child was a daughter Sudakshina née Purnima Devi (later Mrs. Jwala Prasada) who was born on 13 May 1884, at No. 6, Dwarkanath Tagore's Lane, Jorasanko, Calcutta. Purnima Devi was educated at the Loretto Convent (a school for European Girls) at Park Street, Calcutta, as a day scholar and in addition to English she knew Bengali, Sanskrit, Urdu, Hindi, French, Piano and Violin. She passed the Cambridge Trinity College Music Examination. She is the first Bengali lady married in the United Provinces, her husband being the late Hon'ble Pandit Jwala Prasada, M.A., Deputy Commissioner of Hardoi,(an officer in the Imperial Civil Services, great-grandfather of Late Kunwar Jitendra Prasada, a veteran Congress party Leader) in 1903. She was the winner of the B. P. R. A. medal for Diana matches for schooling (1911 Meerut). She is an expert rider going round her villages on horse back and an expert hunter having taken part in big game shooting with her husband. She took a very keen interest in the education and uplift of her sex in India. In memory of her husband she founded 'The Pandit Jwala Prasad Kanya Pathshala' at Shahjahanpur in UP. She helped in the establishment of the Hewett Model Girls' School at Muzaffarnagar, United Provinces, and founded Pardah Clubs at Shahjahanpur and Muzaffarnagar with a view to the improvement of Pardah ladies. She was the owner of several villages in Shahjahanpur District and a beautiful hill property at Nainital(Uttrakhand)called Abbotsford, Prasada Bhawan (Now lived in by her 4th generation of Prasada's who carry their ancestral heritage at best to date), and a house acquired by the army in 1947 in Badami Bagh, Srinagar, Kashmir now the official residence of the Army Head and a house beach in Jagannath Puri. She is the author of a Hindi publication, "unki bunat ki PrathaiJi Siksha" adopted by the United Provinces Educational Text Book Committee for schools. She was engaged in writing a novel in English under the title of "The Last Lamp out." She is the holder of a Kaisar-i-Hind medal and was the first Indian lady exempted from the operation of the Arms Act.

== See also ==
- Tagore family
- Adi Dharm
- Brahmoism
