= Dwijendranath Tagore =

Indian poet, song composer, philosopher, mathematician, painter (1840 - 1926)

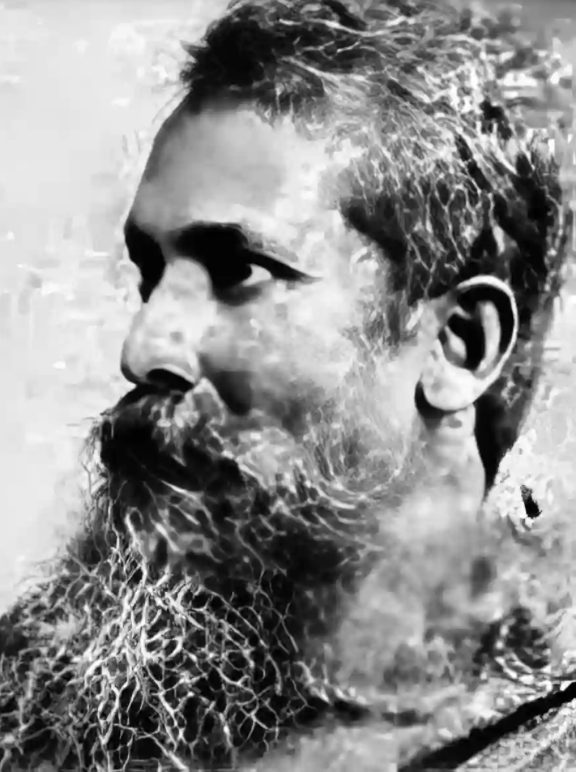
- Dwijendranath Tagore c. 1890s-early 1900s
- Born: 11 March 1840; Calcutta, Bengal Presidency, British India (now Kolkata, India)
- Died: 19 January 1926 (aged 85); Calcutta, Bengal Presidency, British India
- Occupations: Poet, Philosopher, Mathematician
- Spouse: Sarba Sundari Devi
- Children: 9
- Parents: Debendranath Tagore (father); Sarada Sundari Devi (mother)
- Relatives: Indira Devi Chaudhurani (niece), Satyendranath, Hemendranath, Jyotirindranath, Swarnakumari, Rabindranath Tagore (siblings) +9 others
- Family: Tagore family

Dwijendranath Tagore (11 March 1840 – 19 January 1926) was an Indian poet, song composer, philosopher, mathematician and painter. He was one of the pioneers of shorthand and notation in Bengali script. He was the eldest son of Debendranath Tagore and the eldest brother of Rabindranath Tagore.

== Early life ==
Dwijendranath Tagore (born on 11 March 1840) was the grandson of Dwarkanath Tagore of the Jorasanko branch of the Tagore family and the eldest son of Debendranath Tagore and Sarada Devi. His childhood education was mainly with the tutor. However, he also studied for some time at St. Paul's School and Hindu College in Calcutta (now Presidency University). Dwijendranath was very close to his later brother Satyendranath Tagore. Although there were some natural differences between the two brothers. Dwijendranath was a staunch follower of the conventional reforms of the society. On the other hand, Satyendranath was in favor of breaking these reforms and forming a new modern society. Dwijendranath, accustomed to a simple life, was a man of poetry, knowledge-loving and experiment-loving. His wife, Sarbasundari Devi, died in 1878. Dwijendranath spent the rest of his life as a widower.

Two of Dwijendranath's nine children died soon after birth. The remaining five sons were Dwipendranath, Arunendranath, Nitindranath, Sudhindranath and Kripendranath. The names of the two daughters are Saroja and Usha.

== As a poet ==
Dwijendranath's first contribution to Bengali literature was the Bengali translation of Kalidasa's Meghaduta Kavya written in classical Sanskrit. The book was published in 1860, exactly one year before the birth of Nobel Prize-winning younger brother Rabindranath Tagore. At the time of publication, Dwijendranath was only twenty years old. This translation was the first Bengali translation of Meghdoot. Dwijendranath used two different Bengali rhyming styles while translating this book.

His second notable book of poetry, Swapnaprayan, was published in 1875. Rabindranath was only a teenager when this book was published. This poem describes the travelogue of a young man. This text reveals his amazing control over the application of different rhythms. The book is a guide to Bengali poetry of that era and therefore its historical value is undeniable.

When Dwijendranath Tagore started practicing poetry, Michael Madhusudan Dutt was at the pinnacle of his success. After returning to Calcutta from Madras (now Chennai) in 1857, six years before leaving for Europe, Michael Madhusudan concentrated on Tilottamasambhav Kavya (1859), Padmavati (1860), Meghnadabadh Kavya (1861), Brajangana (1861), Birangana Kavya (1862) etc. enriched and influenced the world of Bengali literature through poems and plays. It was during Dwijendranath's lifetime that Bankimchandra Chattopadhyay and Rabindranath Tagore's 'Strong Writing Set Bengali Literature to the Peak of Glory'. Although every poet of Bengal at that time was influenced by Madhusudan more or less, Dwijendranath was above this influence. Rather, it was Madhusudan who welcomed Dwijendranath as the poet of the future.

Despite being a highly talented poet, the person Dwijendranath was a very messy man. Rabindranath writes that the torn manuscripts of the dreamy poems were scattered all over the Jorasanko Thakur Bari. If they had been collected and published, it would have been a valuable edition of the book.

== As a philosopher ==
Dwijendranath Tagore was a 'true philosopher'. He assisted in the establishment and management of two philosophical organizations, the National Society and the Vidvajjan Samagam. He was also deeply interested in Gita philosophy.

His main philosophy is Tattwabidya (in three volumes, 1866-1868). This book is a pioneering book in the history of Bengali philosophy. This national book has not been published in Bengali before. His other two philosophical works are Advaita Mater Samalochana (1896) and Aryadharma O Boudhadharmer Ghat-Protighat (1899).

== As a mathematician ==
Dwijendranath Tagore was a prolific mathematician. He wrote some books in English: a book on boxometry (Baksamiti, it is regarding the structure of the box) (1913), ontology (1871) and geometry.

He was a pioneer in many spheres of far-reaching importance. He invented the shorthand in 'Bengali and wrote a manual on it in verse. He wrote a book on Geometry in which the 12th Axiom had been replaced by new ones. His writings on Boxometry, or science of paper-folding have fascinated scholars of mathematics.

== Other prominent activities with composing music ==
He edited Tattwabodhini Patrika for 25 long years from 1884. He also founded the Hitavadi Patrika. Dwijendranath wanted to continue publishing the Tattvabodhini Patrika. But his other brother Jyotirindranath Tagore proposed to start a new magazine called Bharati. Although Dwijendranath was in charge of editing the paper, it was mainly run by Jyotirindranath.

For his outstanding contribution to Bengali literature, he was elected President of the Bangiya Sahitya Parishad from 1897 to 1900. He was the priest at the session of the Bengal Literary Conference in 1914.

When the income of his zamindari declined during the Pabna Rebellion in 1873, he recommended strict measures against the peasants to "restore peace".

Dwijendranath used to do various experiments. He was one of the pioneers in the introduction of Bangla script or short hand. He also introduced sign script in the form of poems. He also played a leading role in introducing the use of notation in Bengali songs. At that time, none other than Kshetramohan Goswami, an assistant to King Saurindra Mohan Tagore, did this work. In 1913, Dwijendranath also wrote a book on the structure of the box called Baksamiti. His hobby was to wrap paper in various shapes.

From 1866 to 1871 he held the post of Acharya of the Adi Brahmo Samaj. He traveled to Dhaka with his father Debendranath during the inaugural phase of the Dhaka Brahmo Samaj under the supervision of Braja Sundar Mitra.

Dwijendranath was closely associated with Hindu Mela. He also composed patriotic songs for Hindu Mela. Songwriting was his habit. The Brahma Sangeet, Karo Tar Nam Gaan, Jatadin Rahe Deha Pran, composed by him was used for prayer for 7th Pous for many years. His Brahma songs are also widely sung in the general prayers of the Brahmo Samaj. One of his popular patriotic songs written for the Hindu Mela was Malin Mukhchandrama Bharat Tomari.

== Shantiniketan days ==
Dwijendranath spent the last twenty years of his life in Santiniketan in the company of nature through the practice of knowledge and writing. He used to compose humorous quatrains with the Ashramikas of Santiniketan. These rhymes were published in Santiniketan. His sense of humor became the talk of the town in Santiniketan. In Santiniketan, his friendships with birds, squirrels and crows were proverbial. He learned many things. But philosophy was at the center of his interest. He used to set up majlis to take other scholars including Rabindranath. In this meeting he used to recite his compositions. If he did not understand anything, Bidhusekhar would seek the help of Shastri and Kshitimohan Sen.

Rabindranath used to call him Barodada. On his return from South Africa, Mahatma Gandhi and Charles Freer Andrews visited Santiniketan and met Dwijendranath, who also addressed him as Barodada. With the intention of publishing a letter written by Dwijendranath in a newspaper, Mahatma Gandhi wrote as a preface, “You know Dwijendranath. He was the eldest brother of Sri Rabindranath Tagore and he lived life of a monk practically like his father Debendranath Tagore".

Dwijendranath Tagore died in Shantiniketan on 19 January 1926.

== Successors ==
Dwijendranath had five sons - Dipendranath, Arunendranath, Nitindranath, Sudhindranath and Kripendranath. Among them Sudhindranath Tagore (1869-1929) was a prominent writer. He had written several poems, novels and short stories. In 1891 he published a magazine called Sadhana. He was the editor of this magazine. Later, Rabindranath took over the responsibility of editing this magazine. Over time, the paper merged with Bharati.

Among his grandsons, Dipendranath's son Dinendranath Tagore (1882-1935) was a prominent musician. He could pick it up once he heard the song. Although Rabindranath composed self-composed songs, he had trouble memorizing them or composing his notation. Dinendranath used to do this. He is one of the leading composers of Rabindra Sangeet. Rabindranath used to call him "Kandari of all songs".

Soumendranath Tagore (1910-1984), son of Sudhindranath, another son of Dwijendranath, was a prominent orator. His name was well-known in the cultural world in the 1960s and 1970s. He was associated with the communist movement in her early life. Krishna Rimbu (1927-2000), daughter of Anna Roy, a daughter of Sudhindranath, is an international name in the art world. Jean Rimbu was the head of the Schlumberger Company (one of the richest in the world). Madame Rimbu was an art collector, textile researcher and an influential figure in international politics and the art world.

Dwijendranath is also the ancestor of film actress Sharmila Tagore. Latika, the granddaughter of Dwijendranath, was the grandmother of Sharmila Tagore.

== Books ==
Bengali:

- Bengali translation of Kalidasa's Meghaduta Kavya (1860)
- Bhratribhab (1863)
- Tattwabidya (in three volumes, 1866–68)
- Swapnaprayan (1875)
- Sonar Kathi, Rupar Kathi (1885)
- Sonay Sohaga (1885)
- Arayami and Sahebiana (1890)
- Samajik Roger Kabiraji Chikitsa (1891)
- Adwaita Mater Samalochana (1896)
- Aryadharma O Boudhadharmer Ghat-Protighat (1899)
- Bhrahmagyan O Brahmasadhana (1900)
- Bangaer Rangobhumi (1907)
- Haramonir Anveshan (1906)
- Rekhakshar-Barnamala (1912)
- Gita Pather Bhumika (1915)
- Pravandhamala (1920)
- Kavyamala (1920)

English: A book on boxometry (Baksamiti, which has been described as "an elaborate affair of manufacturing receptacles of an endless variety with paper folded in accordance with set codes and formulae very much in the nature of Euclidean principles") (1913), Ontology (1871) and geometry.

His numerous works were published in Jnanankur, Pratibimb, Tattvabodhini Patrika, Bharati, Sadhana, Nabaparya Bangadarshan, Mansi, Sahitya Parishad Patrika, Santiniketan, Budhabar, Shreyasi, Prabasi, Sabujpatra and Suprabhat Patrika.

== See also ==
- List of Bengalis
- List of Bengali language authors (chronological)
