= Swarnakumari Devi =

Indian poet and composer

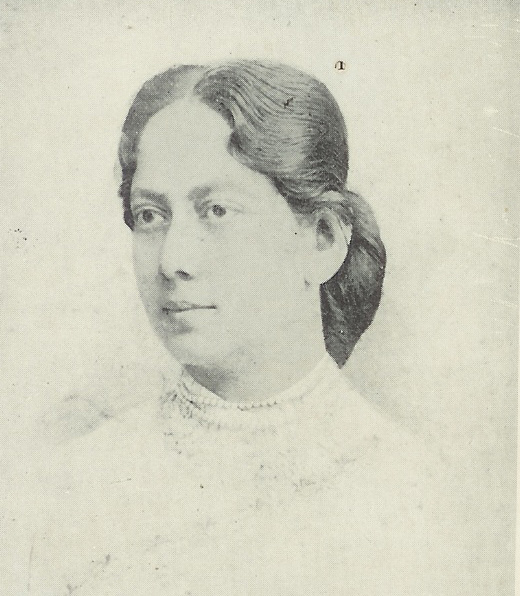
- Swarnakumari Devi
- Born: Swarnakumari Tagore; 1855 or 1856; Calcutta, Bengal Presidency, British India
- Died: 1932 (age 76–77); Calcutta, Bengal Presidency, British India
- Occupations: Writer, editor, social worker
- Notable work: Bharati (journal); Dipnirban (novel); Basanta Utsav (opera); Kahake (novel); Science essays
- Spouse: Janakinath Ghosal (m. 1869)
- Children: 3
- Relatives: Indira Devi Chaudhurani (niece), Dwijendranath, Satyendranath, Hemendranath, Jyotirindranath, Rabindranath Tagore (siblings) +9 others
- Family: Tagore family

Swarnakumari Devi (1855 or 1856 – 1932), also known as Swarnakumari Tagore, Swarnakumari Ghosal, Svarṇakumārī Debī and Srimati Svarna Kumari Devi, was an Indian Bengali writer, editor, essayist, poet, novelist, playwright, composer, and social worker.

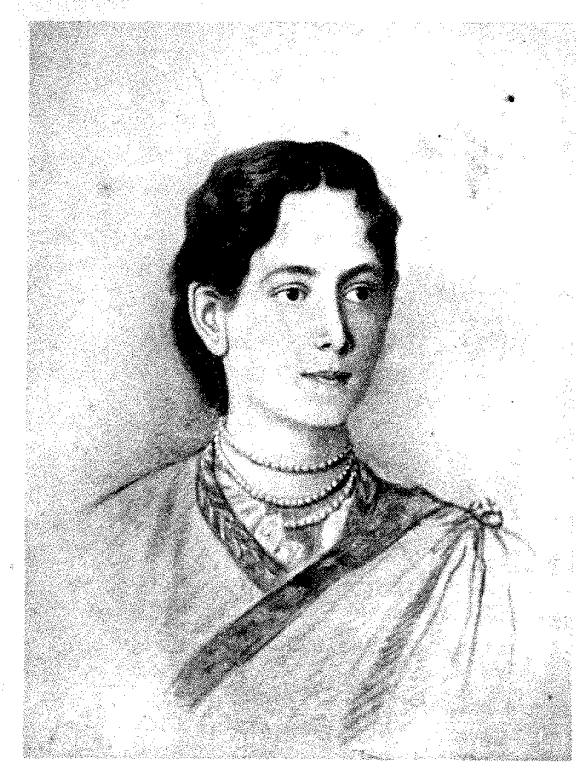
Sketch of Devi c. 1909

== Biography ==
Swarnakumari was born as the tenth child to Debendranath Tagore and Sarada Devi into the Tagore family of Jorasanko, Kolkata in 1855 or 1856. She was the elder sister of Rabindranath Tagore. Her short story Mutiny describes her experience being born just prior to the Sepoy Rebellion of 1857.

Swarnakumari and her sisters did not attend school, but were tutored privately in Sanskrit and English and had the educational benefit of being raised in the Calcutta mansion that was home to the Tagore family. At age 13, she married Janakinath Ghosal, a deputy magistrate. Their children were Hiranmoyee Devi, Sir Jyotsnanath Ghosal (married to Sukriti Devi, daughter of Maharaja Nripendra Narayan and Suniti Devi) and Sarala Devi Chaudhurani.

In 1886, she established the first women's organization in Bengal, Sakhi-Samiti, to help impoverished women. She also founded the Ladies' Theosophical Society in Calcutta.

She participated in sessions of the Indian National Congress in 1889 and 1890. Swarnakumari and Kadambini Ganguly were the first women delegates to the Indian National Congress.

=== Literary career ===
Swarnakumari was a writer and editor for the literary monthly Bharati for more than 30 years, after the journal was established by her older brother Dijendranath Tagore in 1877 or 1878. Her work in Bharati is considered to be among her major achievements.

"Some of the terms she coined include 'upachchhaya' (penambra), 'parnitaru' (fern), 'mohishnu' (sensitive), 'balakhilya' (pigmy), 'tristar' (triambic), 'biswakash' (universe), 'suryabimba' (solarspot), 'abaraha' (hypnotism)"

- Madhumati Mandal, Proceedings of the Indian History Congress (2005-2006)

Swarnakumari is the author of 25 books and a wide range of essays. 17 of her 24 essays on science were published in the journal Bharati between 1880 and 1889, and she expanded the Bengali language by creating new scientific terminology, as well as by incorporating terms created by Rajendralal Mitra, Madhusudan Gupta, Iswar Chandra Vidyasagar and Bankim Chandra Chattopadhyay. Her science essays were written for lay readers, to help facilitate understanding of the concepts and to help promote science education. In 1882, a collection of her science essays, titled Prithivi, was published.

According to Anurupa Devi, "Many women had written poems and stories before her, but these were looked upon patronizingly. She was the first writer to show up the strengths of women's writing and raise women's creations to a position of respect." Swarnakumari achieved contemporary popularity as a novelist, but many of her works have not been reprinted.

Her novel Dipnirban (The Snuffing Out of the Light) was first published anonymously in 1870, but it was eventually understood that the author was a "young Hindu lady", according to a notice in the Hindu Patriot. The Calcutta Review wrote, "We have no hesitation in pronouncing this book to be by far the best that has yet been written by a Bengali lady, and we should no more hesitate to call it one of the ablest in the whole literature of Bengal." In 1879, she published what is believed to be the first Opera written in Bengali, Basanta Utsav (Spring Festival). In her poem Likhitechi (Writing, Day and Night), she expresses frustration at the challenges related to establishing her own career as a writer.

Swarnakumari also wrote more than three hundred songs.

== Selected works ==
Novels

- Dipnirban (The Snuffing Out of the Light), 1870
- Mibar Raj, 1877
- Chinna Mukul (A Picked Flower), 1879
- Mālati, 1881
- Hughlir Imam Badi 1887
- Vidroha (Revolt), 1890
- Snehalata ba Palita (tr. as: The Uprooted Vine), (two volumes) 1892 and 1893, Oxford University Press, 2004 ISBN 9780195665024
- Phulermala (tr. as: The fatal Garland), 1894
- Kahake (To Whom?; tr. as: The Unfinished Song), 1898, Oxford University Press, 2008 ISBN 9780195696356
- Bichitra, 1920
- Swapnabani, 1921
- Milanrati, 1925
- Phuler Mala

Short stories

- Short stories, 1919

Plays

- Koney Badal (Evening Dust Clouds / Time for Seeing the Bride), 1906
- Pak Chakra (Wheel of Fortune), 1911
- Rajkanya
- Divyakamal

== Honors and awards ==
She received the Jagattarini gold medal in 1927 from the University of Calcutta and was the first woman to win this award. She was the president of the Vangiya Sahitya Sammelan (Vangiya literary conference) in 1929.

== Death and legacy ==
She died in 1932 in Kolkata. She has been recognized by the Indian History Congress as one of the first women from Bengal to achieve success as a writer and for her efforts to encourage scientific education, including among women.

== See also ==
- Tagore family
- List of Bengali-language authors (alphabetical)
