= Debendranath Tagore =

Indian philosopher (1817–1905)

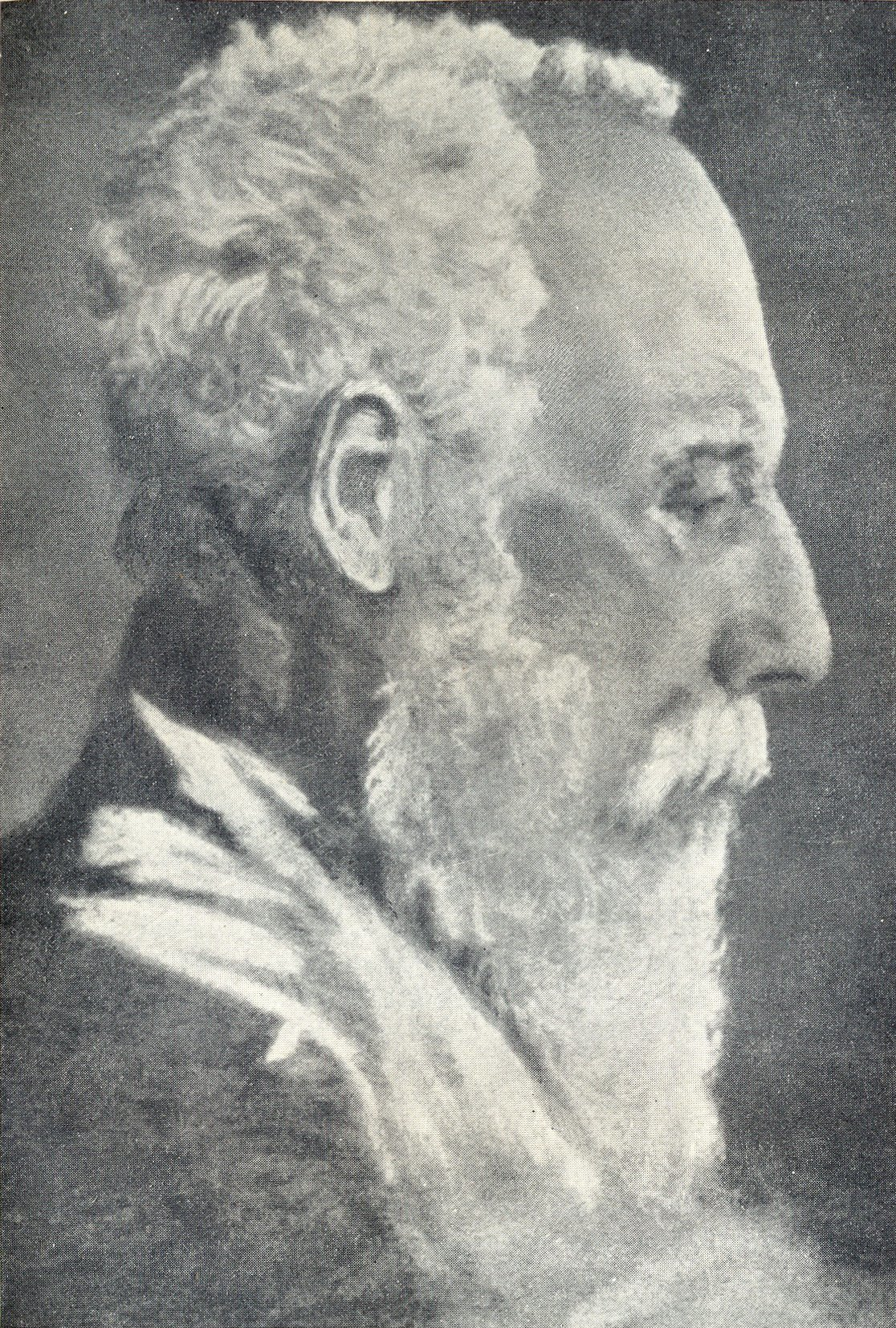
- Portrait of Debendranath Tagore
- Born: 15 May 1817; Calcutta, Bengal Presidency, British India (now Kolkata, West Bengal, India)
- Died: 19 January 1905 (aged 87); Calcutta, Bengal Presidency, British India
- Occupation: Religious reformer
- Movement: Bengal Renaissance
- Spouse: Sarada Sundari Devi
- Children: Dwijendranath, Satyendranath, Hemendranath, Jyotirindranath, Swarnakumari, Rabindranath +9 others
- Parents: Prince Dwarakanath Tagore (father); Digambari Devi (mother)
- Family: Tagore family

Debendranath Tagore (15 May 1817 – 19 January 1905; birth name: Debendronath Thakur) was an Indian philosopher and religious reformer, active in the Brahmo Samaj (earlier called Brahmo Sabha) ("Society of Brahma", also translated as Society of God). He joined the Brahmo Samaj in 1842. He was the founder in 1848 of the Brahmo religion, which today is synonymous with Brahmoism. Born in Shilaidaha, his father was the industrialist Dwarakanath Tagore; many of his 14 children, including Nobel Prize winning poet Rabindranath Tagore, made significant artistic or literary contributions to society.

== Thakur Bari (House of Tagores) ==
Debendranath Tagore's father was famous industrialist Dwarakanath Tagore, who was called 'Prince' because of his extravagant lifestyle, and Digambari Devi was mother, a very pious lady, in the Tagore family in Jorasanko, popularly known as Jorasanko Thakur Bari in North-western Kolkata, which was later converted into a campus of the Rabindra Bharati University. The Tagore family, with over three hundred years of history, was one of the leading families of Calcutta, and is regarded as a key influence during the Bengal Renaissance. The family has produced several persons who have contributed substantially in the fields of business, social and religious reformation, literature, art and music. His siblings were Girindranath Tagore (b.1820) and Nagendranath Tagore (b.1829).

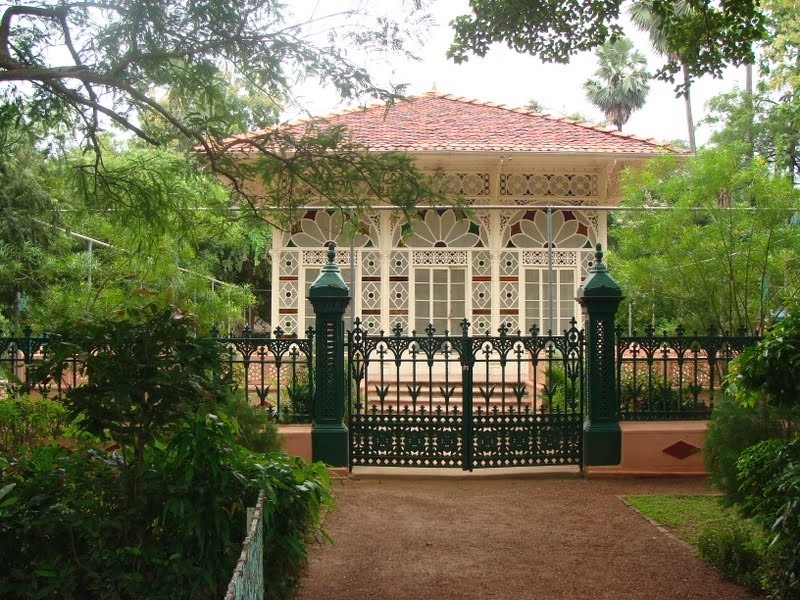
Upasana Griha (Prayer Hall) in Santiniketan, built by Debendranath Tagore in 1863.

== Education and work ==
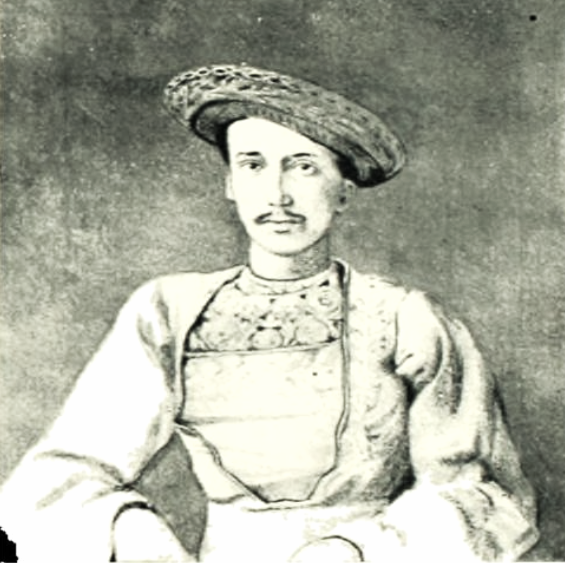
Debendranath Tagore at the age of 18.

Debendranath Tagore started his education at home from 1820 to 1827. In 1829, he was admitted to the Anglo Hindu College established by Raja Rammohan Roy. After studying there for some time, he started looking after his father's property and business, as well as philosophy and religion. When his grandfather died in 1838, he had a mental change. He became interested in religion and started studying various subjects including the Mahabharata, Upanishads and Eastern-Western philosophy. As a result, he developed a desire for spirituality. He established the "Tattwara Jani Sabha" (1839), which was later renamed as the Tattwabodhini Sabha. At this time he published a Bengali translation of the Katha Upanishad (1840).

In 1842, Debendranath was involved in charge of the Tattwabodhini Sabha and the Brahmo Samaj. The following year, the Tattwabodhini Patrika was published in his own money under the editorship of Akshay Kumar Datta. In this newspaper, the Upanishads were published with Debendranath's scholarship and Bengali translation. With the efforts of Debendranath, public meetings were started on the Vedas. In 1844, Debendranath introduced the first method of Brahmopasana and from the following year it was used in the Brahmo Samaj. As a result of his long study of scriptures, he realised it was not possible to lay the foundation of Brahmanism on the Upanishads alone. So from 1848 onwards, he gradually started publishing a translation of the Rig Veda in the Tattwabodhini Patrika, which was published in a library called Brahmo Dharma (1849). In 1850, another of his books, Atmattvavidya, was published. In 1853, he was appointed secretary of the Tattwabodhini Sabha and in 1859 established the Brahma Vidyalaya.

Debendranath ceased the pooja-parvanadi and introduced festivals like 'Magh Utsav', 'New Year', 'Diksha Din' etc. In 1867, he bought a large piece of land called Bhubandaga in Birbhum and established an ashram. This ashram is today's famous Santiniketan. He was also one of the founders of the Bethune Society of the Hindu Charitable Institution.

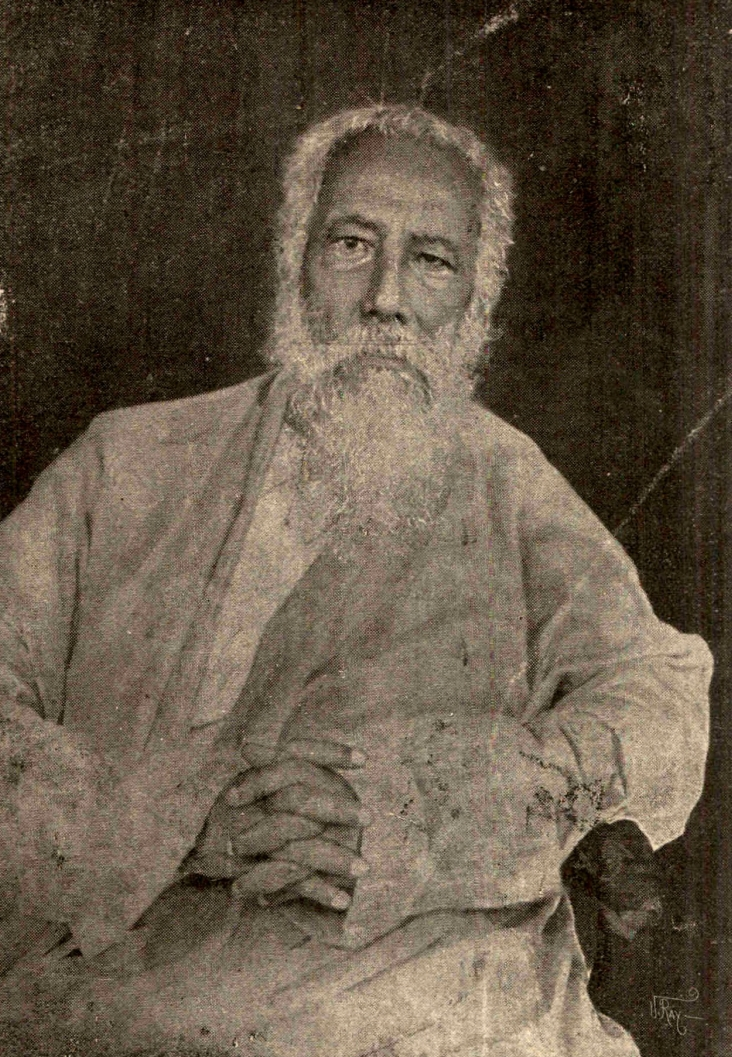
Image of Tagore published in Modern Review, February 1925

Debendranath was actively involved in politics for some time. When the British Indian Association was established on 31 October 1851, he was appointed its secretary. He tried his best to waive the chowkidari tax of the poor villagers and sent a letter to the British Parliament demanding India's autonomy. Debendranath was enthusiastic about the practice of widow remarriage, but was opposed to child marriage and polygamy. He also made a special contribution to the spread of education. In 1867, Radhakanta Deb conferred on him the title of 'Protector of National Religion' and 'Maharshi' by the Brahmo Samaj to protect the Indian youth from the influence of Christianity.

== Books ==
- Brahmo Dharma (1848); English translation by Hem Chandra Sarkar in 1928.
- Brahma Dharmo Grantho (1851)
- Atmatatto Bdya (1852)
- Brahma Dharmer Mot O Biswas (1860)
- Kalikata Bramha Samajer Baktrita (1862)
- Gyan O Dharmer Unnati (1893)
- Porolo O Mukti (1895)
