= Kanika Banerjee =

Indian singer (1924–2000)

- Kanika Banerjee
- Born: Anima Mukherjee; 12 October 1924; Sonamukhi, Bankura district, Bengal Province, British India (present-day West Bengal, India)
- Died: 5 April 2000 (aged 75); Kolkata, West Bengal, India
- Other name: Mohar
- Occupation: Vocalist
- Years active: 1943–2000
- Known for: Rabindra Sangeet singer
- Spouse: Birendra Chandra Bandyopadhyay (m. 1945)

Kanika Banerjee, also known as Kanika Bandyopadhyay (12 October 1924 – 5 April 2000), was a Bengali singer known for performing Rabindra Sangeet. She frequently performed on All India Radio Kolkata and at institutions across India, Europe and America. With over 300 gramophone records, she was praised for her distinct voice and ability to express the subtle emotions in Tagore’s songs while staying true to the notes.

== Biography ==
=== Early life ===
She was born on 12 October 1924 at Sonamukhi in Bankura district, West Bengal. Kanika studied at Visva-Bharati University. She was trained in both classical and Rabindrasangeet in Sangeet Bhavana (School of Music) at Santiniketan. Shantiniketan (which literally means Abode of Peace) was built on the model of an Ashram (educational hermitage). For this reason, Kanika is also occasionally referred to as Ashram Kanya or 'girl of the Ashram'. She took music lessons from Rabindranath Tagore. It was Tagore who named her Kanika (her original name being Anima), also the name of one of his books on poetry. Her other gurus were Dinendra Nath Tagore, Sailajaranjan Majumdar, Indira Devi Chaudhurani and Santidev Ghosh. She participated in dance-dramas directed by Rabindranath and toured all over India as a member of his cultural troupe.

=== Career ===
Kanika Bandyopadhyay joined Sangit Bhavana as a teacher and in due course became Head of the Department of Rabindrasangeet and later its principal. She was made Professor Emeritus of Visva-Bharati.

From 1943, Kanika had been a regular artiste of the Calcutta station of All India Radio and gave performances at the national level in the musical programmes arranged by other stations as honoured artiste. Her gramophone records came out even in the lifetime of the Poet (Tagore) and there are over 300 gramophone discs to her credit. She was also a singer of Bhajans, Nazrulgeeti (songs by Kazi Nazrul Islam) and Atulprasad's songs. However the first song recorded by her was neither a Tagore song nor a Nazrul Geeti but a Bengali Adhunik song composed by Niharbindu Sen.

Kanika was invited to sing by programme organizers not only in India but also in Europe and America and was acclaimed everywhere for her unique rendering of the subtle nuances of emotions expressed in Rabindranath's lyrical compositions. She has written three books on this genre.

She received the highest accolade from Visva-Bharati University, the Desikottama.

=== Awards and accolades ===
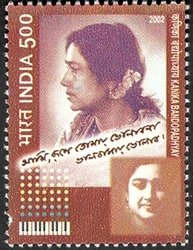
Kanika on a stamp of India - 2002

In appreciation of her outstanding contribution to Rabindra Sangeet she was awarded the Gold Disc of the Gramophone Company of India in 1980. She received the best Bengali playback singer award from the Bengal Film Journalists' Association in 1973. Kanika bagged the Sangeet Natak Akademi Award for the year of 1979. In 1986, she received Padma Shri award from the Government of India. Her alma mater (also home turf) Vishva-Bharati University, bestowed upon her Desikottama, its highest award in 1997.

=== Death ===
Kanika died at the age of 76, on Wednesday 5 April 2000, at SSKM Hospital in Calcutta after a prolonged illness involving lung and cardiac problems. She left behind her a school of music, with numerous students, who bore the legacy of her very own stylization of Rabindrasangeet. Of her students, Rezwana Chowdhury Banya, the singer from Bangladesh, is perhaps the most well-known, for her striking similarity to Kanika's singing style. Indian Prime Minister Atal Bihari Vajpayee gave a condolence speech saying that Kanika "was among the best exponents of Rabindra Sangeet. Generations of music lovers were charmed by her golden voice."

==== Excerpt from Obituary ====
In his obituary: "Nightingale of Rabindrasangeet is no more" published on 5 April 2000, Sankar Ray summarizes his experience of Kanika Bandyopadhyay as a singer:

A recollection of Banerjee describes hearing her sing on an All India Radio programme broadcast from Santiniketan Ashramik Sangha during a rainy evening in 1960. The writer recalled her rendition of ''Saghana Gahana Ratri Jharichhey Shrabanadhara'' and referred to Banerjee affectionately as "Mohardi". The recollection also describes the influence of Banerjee, along with singers such as Debabrata Biswas, Subinoy Roy and Rajeshwari Dutta, on the writer's generation and reflects on Banerjee's contribution to the cultural life of Santiniketan.

== Musical style ==
Kanika Bandyopadhyay was a contemporary of other notable exponents of Rabindrasangeet, namely Hemanta Mukhopadhyay, Chinmoy Chattopadhyay, Suchitra Mitra, Debabrata Biswas, Sagar Sen, Sumitra Sen, Rezwana Choudhury Bannya, Santidev Ghosh and Subinoy Roy. In particular, her musical style has often been compared and contrasted with that of Suchitra Mitra. While both singers excelled in songs of love and worship (puja and prem), Kanika's oeuvre was melodious yet melancholy, plaintive yet soul-stirring, whereas Suchitra was bold and strong in her renditions.

== Personal life ==
Kanika was married in 1945 to Birendra Chandra Bandyopadhyay, former deputy librarian of Viswa Bharati University and a renowned poet. The couple had no children; but later she adopted her younger sister's only son Priyom (Tanaji, the name given by Mohor di). In her later life, Kanika receded to a reclusive lifestyle and led the simple life of an ashramite in Santiniketan.
