= Papia Sarwar =

Bangladeshi singer (1952–2024)

Papia Sarwar পাপিয়া সারোয়ার
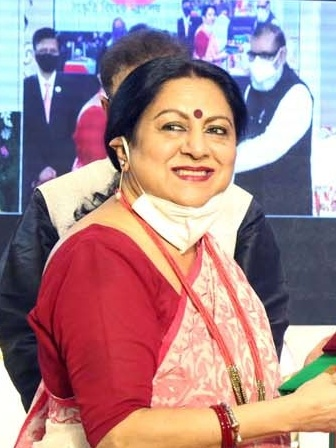
- Sarwar in 2021

Background information
- Born: Papia Rahman; 21 November 1952; Barisal, East Bengal, Pakistan
- Died: 12 December 2024 (aged 72) Dhaka, Bangladesh
- Genre: Rabindra Sangeet
- Years active: 1966–2024

Papia Sarwar (née Rahman; 21 November 1952 – 11 December 2024) was a Bangladeshi singer. She was an exponent of Rabindra Sangeet, the songs written and composed by Rabindranath Tagore. She earned the Rabindra Award from the Bangla Academy in 2013, the Bangla Academy Fellowship in 2015, and the Ekushey Padak in 2021.

Sarwar's notable songs include "Nai Telephone Nai Re Peon Nai Re Telegram".

== Early life and education ==
Papia Sarwar was born in Barisal to Sayed Bazlur Rahman and Fatema Rahman on 21 November 1952. Papia was the fifth of their eight children. She took music lessons from Atiqul Islam, Waheedul Haq, Sanjida Khatun, and Zahidur Rahim at Chhayanaut in 1966 and later at Bulbul Academy of Fine Arts. She was a student of the Department of Zoology at the University of Dhaka. In 1973, she received a scholarship from the Government of India to study Rabindra Sangeet at Visva-Bharati University in Santiniketan. At Visva-Bharati University, she was trained in classical music under Dhruvatara Joshi and in Rabindra Sangeet under Santidev Ghosh, Subinoy Roy, Kanika Banerjee, and Nilima Sen.

== Career ==
Sarwar established a musical troupe named Geetoshudha in 1996. Her published albums include Purna Chander Mayay (2013) and Chokher Dekha Praner Katha (2014).

== Personal life and death ==
Papia Sarwar married Mohammed Sarwar-E-Alam in 1978. Together they had two daughters, Zaara Sarwar, a lecturer of biology at Eastern Washington University in the US and Jisha Sarwar, works at the Financial Services Regulatory Authority of Ontario in Canada.

Sarwar lived in Dhanmondi, Dhaka. She was diagnosed with cancer in 2021. She was placed on ventilator support on 11 December 2024, and died from the disease on 12 December, at the age of 72.
