= Yog Sunder Desai =

Indian dancer, choreographer, and researcher (1921-2020)

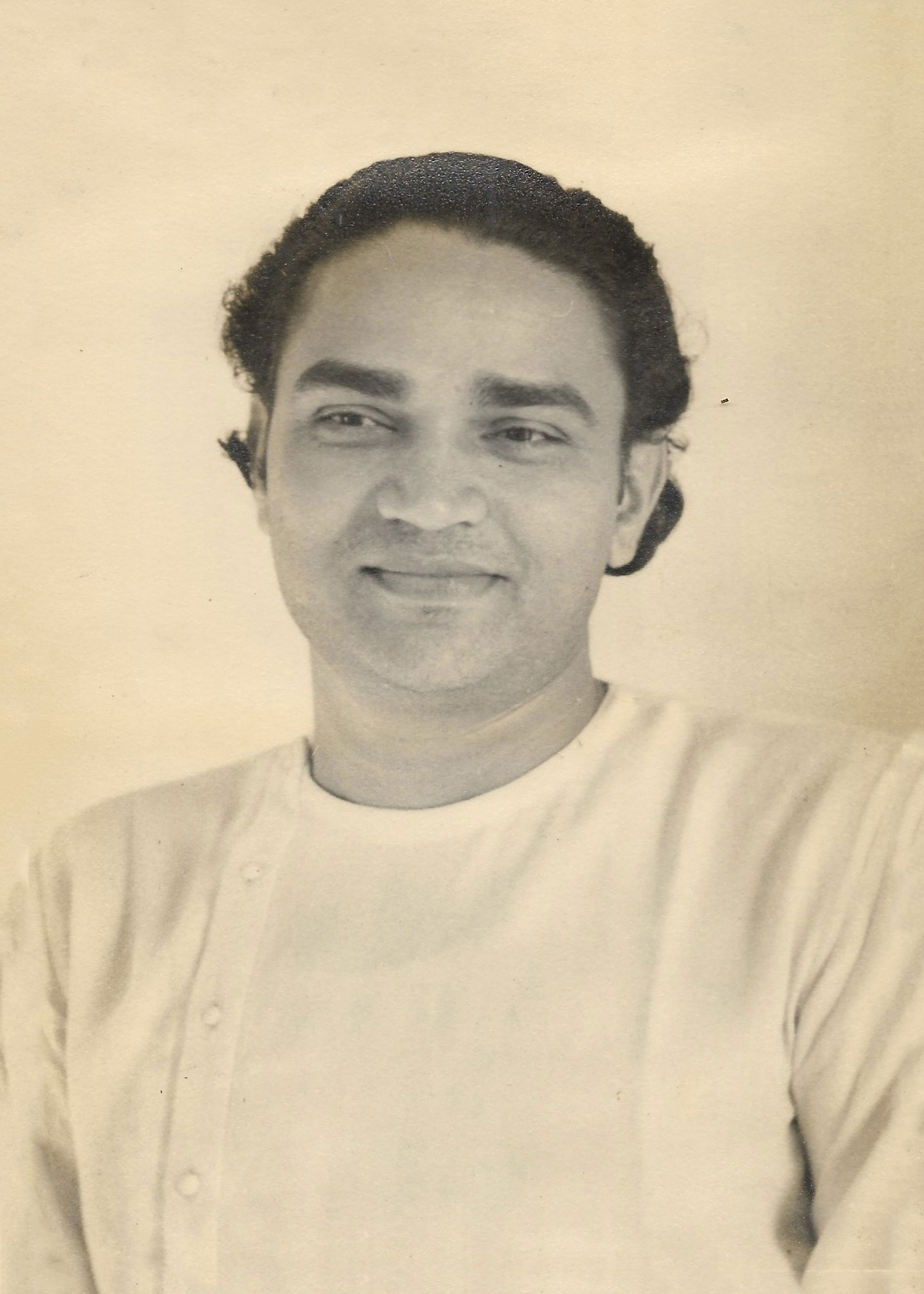
- Born: Yogendra Gopaldas Desai; 16 July 1921; Limbdi, Gujarat, British India
- Died: 27 November 2020 (aged 99); India
- Education: Gujarat Vidyapith, Shantiniketan (Visva-Bharati University)
- Occupations: Dancer, choreographer, researcher, author
- Years active: 1945–2020
- Known for: Founder of Indian Revival Group; promotion of Indian folk and classical dance
- Parent(s): Gopaldas Ambaidas Desai (father), Bhaktiba (mother)
- Awards: Sangeet Natak Akademi Award

Yog Sunder Desai (16 July 1921 – 27 November 2020) was an Indian dancer, choreographer, and researcher known for his work in preserving and promoting Indian folk and classical dance forms. Active from the pre-independence era, he was one of the earliest male dancers from Gujarat to gain national recognition. He received the Sangeet Natak Akademi Award for his lifetime contribution to Indian dance and remains the only Gujarati male dancer to have received the honour.

Desai researched and revived a variety of regional dance traditions in India, often incorporating elements of traditional music, costume, and literature into his productions. He continued his work well into the late 20th century, becoming one of the oldest living Indian choreographers by 2020.

== Early life ==
Yog Sunder was born on 16 July 1921, in Limbdi, Gujarat into a princely family of Gujarat. His maternal grandfather Jhaverbhai Amin was the Diwan of Limbdi state and his paternal grandfather, Ambaidas Jeevabhai’s ancestors were the administrators of the Mughals and the Gaekwads. Yog Sunder was born to illustrious parents Bhaktiba, a freedom fighter and Darbar Gopaldas Ambaidas Desai, the ruler of Dhasa State in Gujarat, the first Indian prince to give up his throne in response to Gandhiji’s call to serve the motherland and join the freedom movement. Darbar Saheb as he was called became a prominent leader of Gujarat, leading the masses with Sardar in Borsad and Bardoli Satyagrahas, Salt Satyagraha and the Quit India movement. President of Kathiawad Rajkiya Parishad and Saurashtra Congress Committee, Gopaldas worked for the unification of the 200 plus states of Kathiawad - Ekam Saurashtra. He was the first prince in India to merge his principality with the Indian Union and one of the First members of the Constituent Assembly of India. The constitution of India bears his signature.

A product of national and cultural institutions (Rashtriya Shaalas) like Dakshinamurthy, Gujarat Vidyapith, and Tagore’s Shantiniketan, Yog Sunder had a privileged upbringing spent under the guidance of Gandhiji, Sardar Patel & Rabindranath Tagore. He went to Bardoli ashram at the age of 5 during the Bardoli Satyagraha & participated in the freedom movement as a member of Vanar Sena in Borsad Chhaoni (camp), participating in the Satyagrahas, distributing Satyagraha patrikas. He was a Swayam Sevak at Haripura Congress session of 1938, presided over by Subhash Chandra Bose, where his father was the president of the reception committee. He joined Rajkot Satyagraha as a student of Dakshinamurthy and later, the 1942 Quit India movement.

In Shantiniketan he learnt Painting under the legendary Nandalal Bose in Kala Bhavana & Manipuri dance from Guru H Atomba Singh, Rabindra Sangeet from Santidev Ghose in Sangit Bhavana.

Yog Sunder trained in Kathakali under Guru Kelu Nair in Shantiniketan & under Padmashri Guru Vazhenkada Kunchu Nair in Kerala. He learnt Krishnattam from Shri Krishna Kartav & Mohiniattam from Smt. Kochumalu Amma in Kerala. He was the first non-malayali to have undergone full rigorous training in Kathakali.

== Career ==
Yogendra Sunder as he was known then, debuted on the Bombay stage as Raja Bhim Dev in K M Munshi’s 'Jai Somnath' in 1945 with Nayana Jhaveri as Chauladevi. During this period Yog Sunder performed in several productions of the Indian National Theatre & Gujarati adaptations of Tagore's 'Chandalika' and 'Tasher Desh’ (Patta No Pradesh).

The legendary Ram Gopal of Bangalore invited him to join his troupe which toured united India including Lahore and Karachi in 1946 and Yogendra established himself as an outstanding Kathakali dancer. He learnt Kathak from Pt. Bhure Lal.

He started the Indian Progressive Ballet Group in Calcutta in 1947 and ran the Group on a cooperative basis successfully and produced well reputed programmes. The first show in Kalika theatre was a house full show. The brochure was designed by Satyajit Ray.

Yogendra Sunder partnered the renowned dancer and film actress and the daughter of Keshav Chandra Sen (founder of Brahmo Samaj) - Sadhona Bose in 'Abhisar' (or Vasavadatta), based on Tagore's poem. Yogendra played the roles of Rama in Ramayana & Krishna in Geet Govind with a group called 'Mystic Dancers of India'.

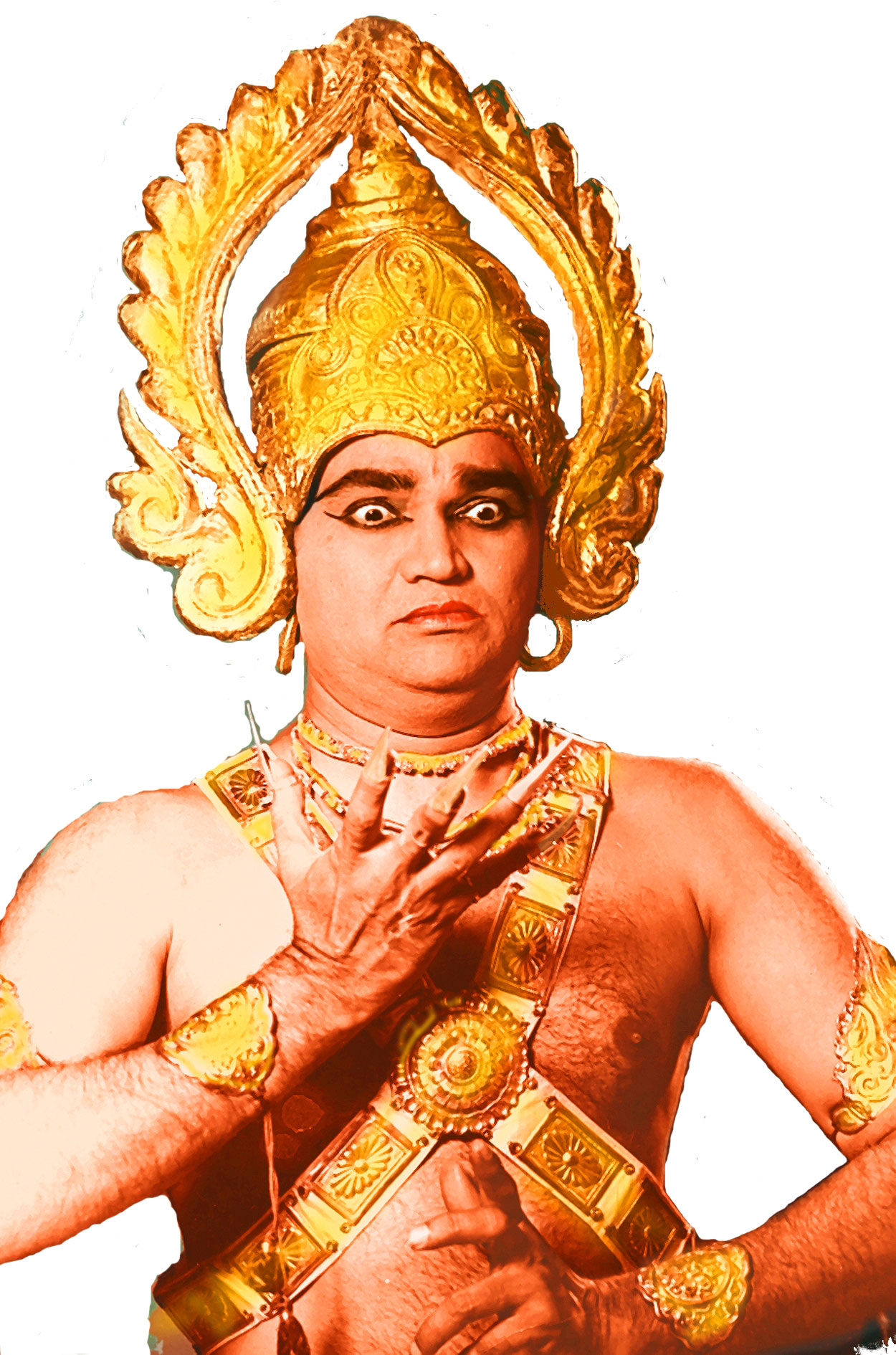
Yog Sunder as Arjuna

Yog Sunder founded his dance ensemble in 1948 in Calcutta and called it the Indian Revival Group in the spirit of revivalism that was sweeping the country. One of the foremost dance ensembles in India. The Group has completed over 75 years of unbroken chain of existence, dedicated to the cause of furthering the rich multi-cultural heritage, mythology, philosophy and glory of India. Inspired by Gandhian ideologies, Yog Sunder has taken art to the masses.

Yog Sunder undertook adventurous tours to border areas in Ladakh and Arunachal Pradesh. The Indian Revival Group was the first to visit Ladakh in 1958, where it performed for the Jawans at an altitude of over 12,500 feet with the help of oxygen. The group has taken challenging journeys in the Himalayas to reach difficult and snow-covered places to perform for the Indian Army. Artists wearing army boots and jackets, performed on makeshift army truck stages with truck headlights.

The first production of Indian Revival Group ‘Freedom Festival’ premiered on 15 August 1948. This production was followed by "Birth of freedom", presented on Gandhi Jayanti in 1949 followed by 'Ajanta’. 'Mahabharata' in silhouette and shadow was presented in Purna Kumbh Mela, Haridwar in 1950 so that maximum people could witness at minimum cost. Yog Sunder was the producer-director and Arjuna. Indian Revival Group has produced and presented several ballets and dance programmes incorporating different styles and techniques of Indian dance with appeal to the masses and classes alike.

In 1954 Yog Sunder went to Egypt through INT of Bombay to perform on a chartered cruise ship 'SS Independence'. The Indian Revival Group's first tour abroad was arranged by the Indian National Theatre in the year 1954, when it performed in Cairo. The Group was received by the then President of Egypt, General Naguib, and its programme received reviews in the Egyptian press with front page news and photographs.

In 1955, Yog Sunder produced 'Rhythms of India,' a spectacle of India's rich and varied dance heritage that has stood the test of time and remained ever popular, evolving in the last 70 years. The show went on All-India Tours in 1955 and 1956 which lasted for over ten months each.

Yog Sunder performed at the First Command Performance at Rashtrapati Bhawan before the first President, Dr. Rajendra Prasad and first Prime Minister, Pt. Nehru wih his group in 1957. Subsequently, his group performed for Dr. S Radhakrishnan, Shri Lal Bahadur Shastri, Smt. Indira Gandhi and many international leaders such as Mrs. Kennedy at Rashtrapati Bhavan and abroad.

In 1957, Yog Sunder visited the erstwhile Soviet Union. The Group was one of the three cultural troupes selected by the Government of India to represent India at the Sixth World Youth Festival held at Moscow in 1957. Of the 100 troupes from different countries this Group was the only one presented on Moscow Television four times.

Yog Sunder's Indian Revival Group recorded the first dance program for Doordarshan (Natioanal Television).

In 1959-1960, Yog Sunder undertook a tour of the Middle East by land route via Afghanistan, performing in seven countries in seven months - Afghanistan, Iran, Iraq, Syria, Lebanon, Gaza, Egypt, and Kuwait, without any prior booking in any country, and on a cooperative basis where all were equal partners. This was the first time any Indian dance troupe had gone to these countries. In Gaza, they performed for the UN forces.

In 1963, Yog toured India and Europe in 1964. The Group was sent by the Government of India to participate in the International Folk Dance Festival in Istanbul and his group won an award. A two-and-a-half-month tour took them to perform in East Europe, Turkey, Hungary, Yugoslavia, Morocco and Cairo. The Group also represented India at the International Folk Dance Festival held at Istanbul in 1964.

Yog Sunder directed the 'Ram Lila' for Shriram Bharatiya Kala Kendra in 1966 and ‘The Lore of Ind’ for Indian Tourism Development Corporation in 1967.

His magnum opus titled 'The Man Divine' based on Tagore's poem 'The Child', Tagore's one and only original English poem which was later translated in Bengali as 'Shishu Tirtha'. The production is a tribute to both Gandhi and Tagore, the two men who influenced him in life, produced in 1969 for Gandhiji's birth centenary at the behest of the then congress President UN Dhebar. The production was produced at a colossal scale bringing together masters like Jyotindra Maitra and Satish Bhatia of All India Radio for the music score, Goverdhan Panchal of National School of Drama for designing the sets, Malti Mehta for costumes and NSD’s Ram Gopal Bajaj who wrote & gave voice to the Hindi commentary.

In 1975 Yog Sunder directed "Shyama" in Hindi which toured England, Wales, Ireland and Scotland for Tagore's 125th Birth Celebrations in 1986.

Yog Sunder was invited to participate in Sangeet Natak Akademi’s First and Second Festival of Contemporary Indian ‘Ballet’ and presented productions on contemporary themes - "The Journey" in 1976 and "Darkness at Noon" in 1977.

In the eighties he created ‘Ram Katha’ assimilating the Folk Theatre traditions & story telling techniques of India where Nat and Nati narrate the story employing the technique of Rangla and Rangli of ‘Bhawai’ the Folk Theatre of Gujarat.

Yog led the Group to Tanzania, Kenya Jordan, Oman, Bahrain & Iraq for Indian Council for Cultural Relations in 1980 & to Festival of India 'Semaine de l’ Inde' held in the Island of Reunion in 1992. The Group also represented India at the International Folk Dance Festival held at Mussul, in Iraq in 1980, and won Awards and distinctions.

He designed Cultural Festivals of India in London and USA for Akshardham Sanstha in 1985 and 1991.

He has produced and directed many dance productions. Prominent are Birth of Freedom, Freedom Festival, Mahabharata, Voice from Beyond, Dances of India, Rhythms of India, Kiratarjun, Chandalika, Call of the Country, Rhythms and Melody, Ramlila, The Lore of India, The Man Divine, Paridhan, Shyama, The Journey, Darkness at Noon, Ram Katha, Festivals of India, Shakuntala, Ekoham Bhahusyam, Yama Parajay, and Harmony.

Sangeet Natak Akademi Archives has documented several of his productions.

Yog Sunder has also written widely on Indian Art in the name of Yogendra Priyadarshi. His series of articles on Natya Shastra in Gujarati Art magazine ‘Kumar’ from 1946 to 1950 won him appreciation for its authenticity.
