= Rezwana Choudhury Bannya =

Bangladeshi singer (born 1957)

Rezwana Choudhury Bannya রেজওয়ানা চৌধুরী বন্যা
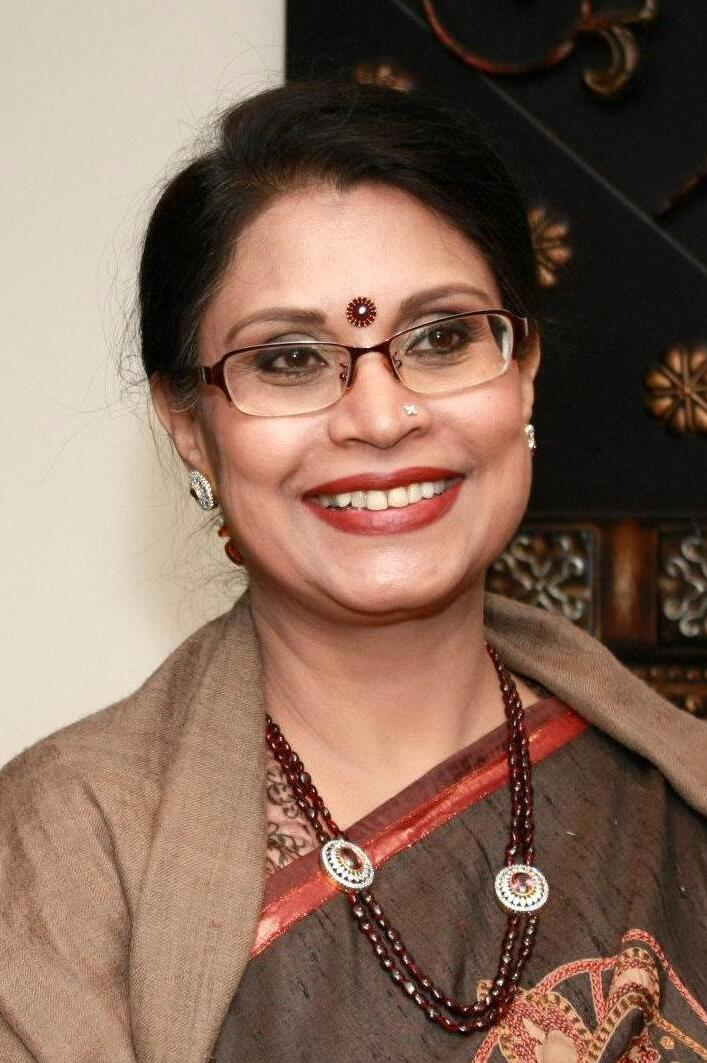
- Bannya in 2017

Background information
- Born: 13 January 1957 (age 69); Rangpur, East Pakistan, Pakistan
- Genres: Rabindra Sangeet
- Occupations: Singer, professor
- Instruments: Vocal, harmonium, esraj

Rezwana Choudhury Bannya (born 13 January 1957) is a singer from Bangladesh. She is an exponent of Rabindra Sangeet, the songs written and composed by Rabindranath Tagore. She has won many awards including Bangladesh's highest civilian award, the Independence Day Award (2016) and India's fourth highest civilian award, Padma Shri (2024).

== Early life ==
Rezwana Choudhury Bannya was born in Rangpur in the then East Pakistan (now Bangladesh). Her father, Mazharuddin Khan, was the general manager of Bangladesh Road Transport Authority (BRTA). Her mother, Ismat Ara Khan (d. 2016), was the vice-principal of Kakoli High School. Bannya has two siblings. She started learning Rabindra Sangeet when she was at grade six. Her early singing lessons began with her paternal uncle Abdul Ali and continued later under the tutelage of Sanjida Khatun and Atiqul Islam at Chhayanaut and Bulbul Academy of Fine Arts (BAFA) in Dhaka. As she continued taking lessons in music and singing, she also joined the Economics Program at the university of Dhaka after completion of her schooling. However, soon her inner self came to the realization that music was her destiny. She received a scholarship from the Indian Council for Cultural Relations (ICCR) to study in Sangit Bhavana at Santiniketan, the university that was founded by Tagore himself. She took lessons from artistes including Kanika Bandyopadhyay, Nilima Sen, Sailajaranjan Majumdar, Santidev Ghosh, Gora Sarbadhikary, Manju Bandyopadhyay and Asesh Bandyopadhyay. Years after receiving her master's degree from Visva-Bharati, she trained under Kanika Banerjee (Mohor Di) in private sessions for an extended period of time, as she recalled in the Musiana episode, "Meeting Mohar Di", hosted by Srikanto Acharya.

In 2021 she completed her research on Rabindra Sangeet at the University of Dhaka, for which she received the degree of Doctor of Philosophy.

== Career ==
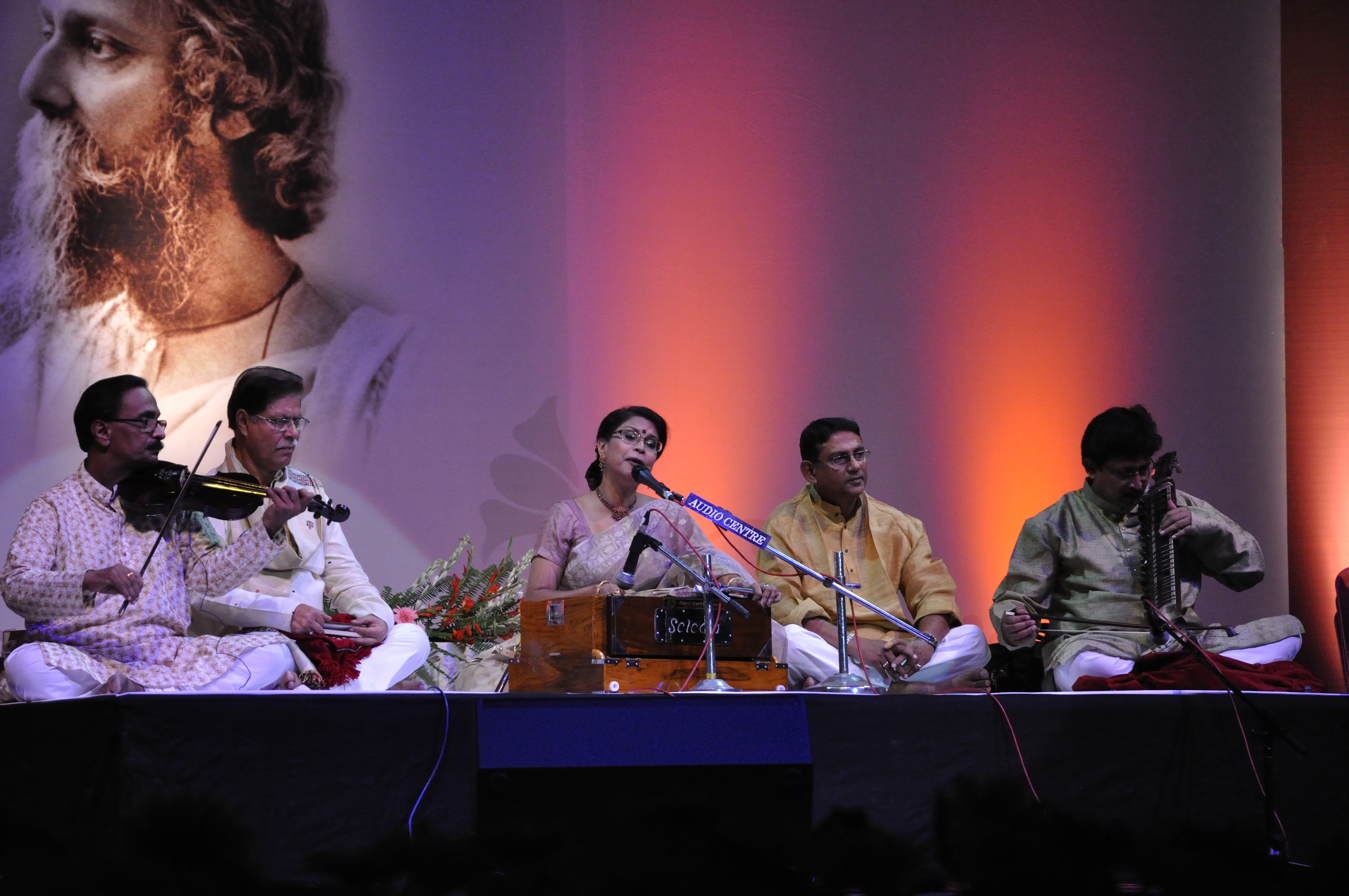
Bannya performing at an event in Kolkata in 2011.

Bannya is currently Professor and founding chair of the Department of Dance at the University of Dhaka; previously, she had been a professor in the Department of Music at the same university. Inspired by Kanika Bandyopadhyay, she founded in 1992 Shurer Dhara, a prestigious music school in Dhaka. with a focus on Ranbindra Sangeet. Bannya is currently Honorary Dean, Faculty of Performing Arts & Chairperson of Music Department of Tagore University of Creative Arts. In 2010, in order to commemorate the 150th birth anniversary of Rabindranath Tagore, she brought out a complete audio version of 2,233 songs in Tagore's Gitobitan, which was titled Sruti Gitobitan.

== Awards ==
- Ananda Sangeet Puroshkar for being the best female Rabindra Sangeet artist (2002)
- Gaane Gaane Gunijon Shongbardhona (2011)
- Sangeet Samman Puroshkar from the Ministry of Culture, India in 2013
- Independence Day Award (2016)
- Banga Bhushan (2017) by the Government of West Bengal
- Firoza Begum Memorial Gold Medal (2017)
- Sangeet Maha Samman (2017) by the Government of West Bengal
- Doctorate of Arts honoris causa from Asian University for Women (2019)
- Lifetime Achievement Award conferred by Oikko.com.bd Channel I (2022)
- Padma Shri by the Government of India (2024)

== Albums ==
- Swapner Aabhashe (2014)
- Sokal Saajhe
- Bhorer Aakashe (2012)
- Laguk Haowa (2012)
- Apan Pane Chahi
- Pran Khola Gaan (2011)
- Elem Nutan Deshe
- Sudurer Mita
- Maatir Daak
- Khelar Saathi
- Gethechinu Anjali
- Moner Majhe Je Gaan Baaje
- Mor Dorodiya
- Surer Ashonkhani
- Surer Kheya
- Patar Bhela Bhasai
- Shraban Tumi
- Chinnopotro (2004)
- Kabi Pranam (2008)
- Baaje Rammyabina
- Sarasha Sangeet Madhurima (Songs Of Tagore) (2001)
- Keno Chokher Jole Song Poetry Synthesis with Samiul Islam Poluck
