= Suchitra Mitra =

Indian musical artist (1924–2011)

Background information
- Born: 19 September 1924; Gujhandi, Bihar, British India
- Died: 3 January 2011 (aged 86) Kolkata, West Bengal, India
- Genres: Playback singing, Rabindrasangeet
- Occupation: Singer
- Years active: 1941–2011

Suchitra Mitra (19 September 1924 – 3 January 2011) was an Indian singer, composer, artist exponent of Rabindra Sangeet or the songs of Bengal's poet laureate Rabindranath Tagore, professor, and the first woman Sheriff of Kolkata. As an academic, she remained a professor and the Head of Rabindra Sangeet Department at the Rabindra Bharati University until 1984. Mitra was a playback singer in Bengali films (and acted in some as well) and was associated for many years with the Indian People's Theatre Association.

Mitra studied at the Scottish Church College, the University of Calcutta and at Visva-Bharati University in West Bengal, India. She was also the Sheriff of Kolkata (2001). After prolonged illness Mitra died of a cardiac ailment on 3 January 2011, in Kolkata.

== Early life ==
Mitra's father, the celebrated littérateur, Saurindra Mohan Mukherjee, was a close associate of the Tagore family of Jorasanko. Suchitra Mitra's natural aptitude in music was recognised by Pankaj Mullick, who gave her a first lesson in Rabindra Sangeet. From her childhood, as the youngest member of her family, Suchitra cultivated her love for the songs and poetry of Tagore. She had an unerring ear for music and a natural gift of voice and expression. She was born in a running train near station Gujhandi, so her nickname was Goju.

== Musical career ==
In 1941, Suchitra Mitra received a scholarship to Sangit Bhavana in Santiniketan, where she learnt Rabindra Sangeet from some of the greatest teachers – Indira Devi Chaudhurani, Santidev Ghosh, and Sailajaranjan Majumdar. Having obtained her diploma from Santiniketan, Suchitra Mitra returned to Calcutta in 1945. In 1946, she earned her degree from Scottish Church College of the University of Calcutta. In the same year, she co-founded Rabitirtha along with Dwijen Chowdhury (the name Rabitirtha was coined by renowned historian and Tagore scholar Professor Kalidas Nag). Under Suchitra's leadership, Rabitirtha emerged as one of the leading schools of Rabindra Sangeet (in Kolkata). Founder and Principal, Suchitra Mitra was an active figure and inspiration behind this establishment. Her dedication, sincerity and comprehension of the subtle nuances underlying Tagore's songs is indeed praiseworthy.

Suchitra was an exponent and an interpreter of Tagore's musical compositions. Her other interests included performing arts, including theatrical performances, film-acting, painting, etc. Mitra produced Rabindra Nritya Natyas (or Tagore's dance dramas); she had acted and danced in many of them. She also acted in stage-plays/dance-drama like Valmiki Pratibha and in films like Dahan directed by Rituparno Ghosh. Her other intellectual pursuits included: reciting poetry, writing short stories, poems and children's rhymes, publishing essays and books on more thought-provoking subjects, such as the grammar and techniques involved in rendering Rabindra Sangeet or on the aesthetics of the music of Tagore. Her greatest achievements may have been her ability to immortalise Tagore's songs both at home and abroad to people of all ages. Invited to the USSR and Hungary, Mitra spread the message of Tagore to the western audience. With the Rabitirtha troupe, she performed Tagore's dance dramas in the US and Canada. She was the author of many books in Bengali on Rabindra Sangeet, and had recently directed her efforts towards compiling an encyclopaedia of Tagore's songs for students and researchers. Suchitra Mitra's repertoire and expertise, coupled with her ability to inculcate in others the love of Rabindra Sangeet, establishes her as one of the notable names in the world of performing arts in India. Ustad Amjad Ali Khan recognises her as his guide into the world of Rabindrasangeet.

Suchitra was considered to be one of the most versatile exponents of Rabindra Sangeet, and in recognition thereof she was awarded the Padma Shri by the Government of India in 1974. Together with Kanika Bandopadhyay, Debabrata Biswas and Hemanta Mukhopadhyay, she formed the Golden Quartet of Rabindrasangeet who popularised the compositions of Rabindranath Tagore and left an indelible impression in the fields of arts and culture.

== Recognition ==
Her reputation as a successful artiste resulted in her appointment as lecturer in Rabindra Bharati University, where she held the prestigious office of Head of the Department of Music. She also succeeded Pankaj Mullick in Sangeet Sikshar Asar – a very popular programme of Akashvani – a tutorial on Rabindrasangeet that was broadcast live. In recognition of her creative talents, Suchitra Mitra received numerous accolades. Some of Mitra's notable awards included.

- Tagore Hymn Prize in 1945 from London Tagore Hymn Society.
- Padma Shri in 1974 from the Government of India
- Sangeet Natak Academy Award in 1986 from the Government of India
- His Master's Voice Golden Disc Award,
- Shiromoni Puraskar from Asian Paints,
- Desikottama from Visva-Bharati,
- Allauddin Puraskar from the Government of West Bengal, among numerous others.

She was conferred 3 honorary D.Litt. degrees by the Rabindra Bharati University, the University of Burdwan and Jadavpur University. As aforementioned, Mitra was also the recipient of the Desikottama (or honorary D.Litt) of the Visva-Bharati University, which is regarded as the pinnacle of recognition in the genre of Rabindra Sangeet.

She retired in 1984 from Rabindra Bharati University as a professor and the Head of Rabindra Sangeet Department.

Her presence has been an inspiration to younger generations of artists who wish to master the art of Tagore.

== In popular culture ==
She has been the subject of multiple biographic documentary films. One of them, titled Suchitra Mitra (1993) by Raja Sen, went on to win the National Film Award for Best Cultural Film. In 1989 Subroto Ghosh made a documentary on her entitled Suchitra Mitra....the Other Documentary which was a non-biographical work and which tried to bring out the artiste in her that had blossomed imbibing Tagore's philosophy. This film was shown in the Bombay International Film Festival for Short Films & Documentaries. She was awarded Rabindra-Tattwacharya by Tagore Research Institute, Kolkata.

She became the first female Sheriff of Kolkata in 2001.

== Bibliography ==
- Kheyal Khushi (Collection of children's rhymes & a playlet; illustrated by the author). 1978. Prangon, Kolkata.
- Tagore songs (encyclopedia). 1984.
- Gurer Putul. Ananda Publishers. 2000. ISBN 81-7215-457-7.
- Ratanpurer Rahasya. Ananda Publishers. ISBN 81-7756-077-8.
