= Samiul Islam Poluck =

Bangladeshi elocutionist

- সামিউল ইসলাম পোলাক
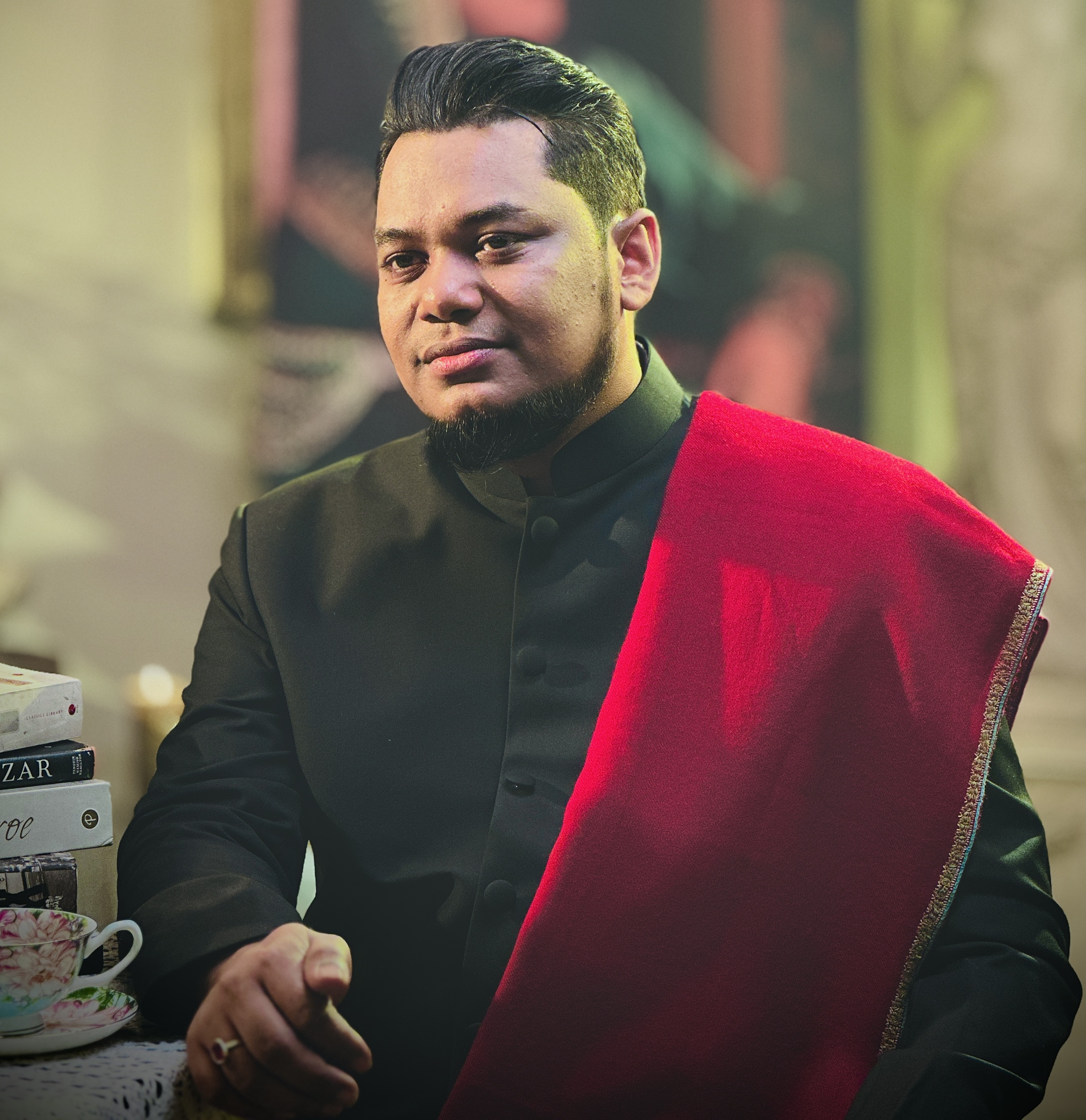
- Poluck in 2024
- Born: Poluck; Faridpur, Bangladesh
- Occupation: Reciter
- Years active: 2013

Samiul Islam Poluck is a Bangladeshi reciter. He is a gold medalist at Jatiyo Shikkha Shoptaho in 2001. His full name is A F M Samiul Islam. UNESCO honored his interpretation of Kazi Nazrul Islam's poem "Bidrohi" for its centennial celebration. He is featured in India's music labels like Saregama and Hisdusthan Records. He is an artist of Bangladesh Television.

== Career ==
Poluck was introduced into the world of recitation at a young age. He has trained Paroma Banerjee (Shantiniketan). He did a four-year diploma course in recitation at Bangladesh Shilpakala Academy from 1998 to 2002. He is a regular artist of Bangladesh Television and Bangladesh Betar.

Poluck has been praised for his abilities. His solo recitation show at the Rabindra Sadan stage in Kolkata, organized by the Department of Cultural Affairs of West Bengal, showcased his exceptional talent and garnered widespread acclaim. He has collaborated with Tagore’s artists like Soumitra Chatterjee, Rezwana Choudhury Bannya, Indrani Sen, Bratati Bandyopadhyay, Shama Rahman, Srabani Sen, Shreya Guhathakurta, Adity Mohsin, Jayati Chakraborty, Iman Chakraborty, Sourendro-Soumyojit and Shwapnil Shojib.

== Discography ==
Year	Album title	Subject	Co-Artist	label	Ref.
2017	"Iti Rabindranath"	recitation album	solo	Hindusthan Records	
2021	"keno chokher jole bhijiye dilem na"	Song Poetry Synthesis	Rezwana Choudhury Bannya		
2022	"Mera Kuch Samaan"	Song Poetry Synthesis	priyangbada Banerjee	Saregama	
2023	"Bidrohi- the spirit of rebel"	poetry movie	Ashna Habib Bhabna	UNESCO	
2023	"Kabitanjali"	recitation album	solo	Saregama Bengali	

== Awards and honors ==
Poluck has received many awards, including the Bangladesh International Fame Award (BIFA) in 2022 and 2023, Jatiyo Kobi Kazi Nazrul Islam Shammanona Smarak 2022. He also awarded with certificate of appreciation for his recitation performance by Indian High Commission, The U.S. Embassy, Dhaka. and Visva-Bharati University, Santiniketan. In 2024, he received the Tele Cine Award for his poetry album Kabitanjali published under the banner of Saregama.

== Books ==
Poluck published a book (August 8, 2023) THIRTY THREE SUMMER.
