= Sagarmoy Ghosh =

Indian Bengali author and editor (1912–1999)

- Born: 22 June 1912; Chadpur, Bengal Presidency, British India
- Died: 19 February 1999 (aged 86); Calcutta, West Bengal, India
- Occupations: Journalist, Writer, Teacher
- Organization: Desh (magazine)
- Relatives: Santidev Ghosh (Brother)
- Awards: Ananda Puraskar

Sagarmoy Ghosh (22 June 1912 – 19 February 1999) was a Bengali author and the longest serving editor of Desh.

== Early life ==
Ghosh was born in Chandipur village, Comilla, in British India, His father Kalimohan Ghosh and elder brother famous singer Santidev Ghosh were closely associated with Rabindranath Tagore. Ghosh was interested in music and literature since childhood and completed his study from the school of Shantiniketan. He passed B.A from Calcutta University. In 1932, he participated in the Non-cooperation movement and was imprisoned by the police.

== Career ==
In jail he met with Ashok Kumar Sarkar, well known editor of Ananda Bazar Patrika and joined in Anandabazar group. He became the assistant editor of Desh in 1939. Ghosh's task was to pick up young and promising writers for the magazine. He became the editor of the magazine in 1976 and for more than 5 decades he was with Ananadabazar and it's literary wings and made it an institution amongst Bengalis. A number of literary figures of Bengal contributed to the Desh magazine in his editorship. Ghosh's notable works are: Ekti Perekere Kahini, Sampadoker Boithake, Dandyakaranyar Bagh and Hirer Nakchhabi.

== Awards ==
In 1986 he was awarded Viswa Bharati University's highest honour Deshikottam. Ghosh received Calcutta University's first Narayan Gangopadhyay award for his book Ekti Pereker Kahini. In 1984 he received Ananda Puraskar along with Sukumar Sen and Bimal Mitra.
