= Shwapnil Shojib =

Bangladeshi singer and actor

Shwapnil Shojib স্বপ্নীল সজীব
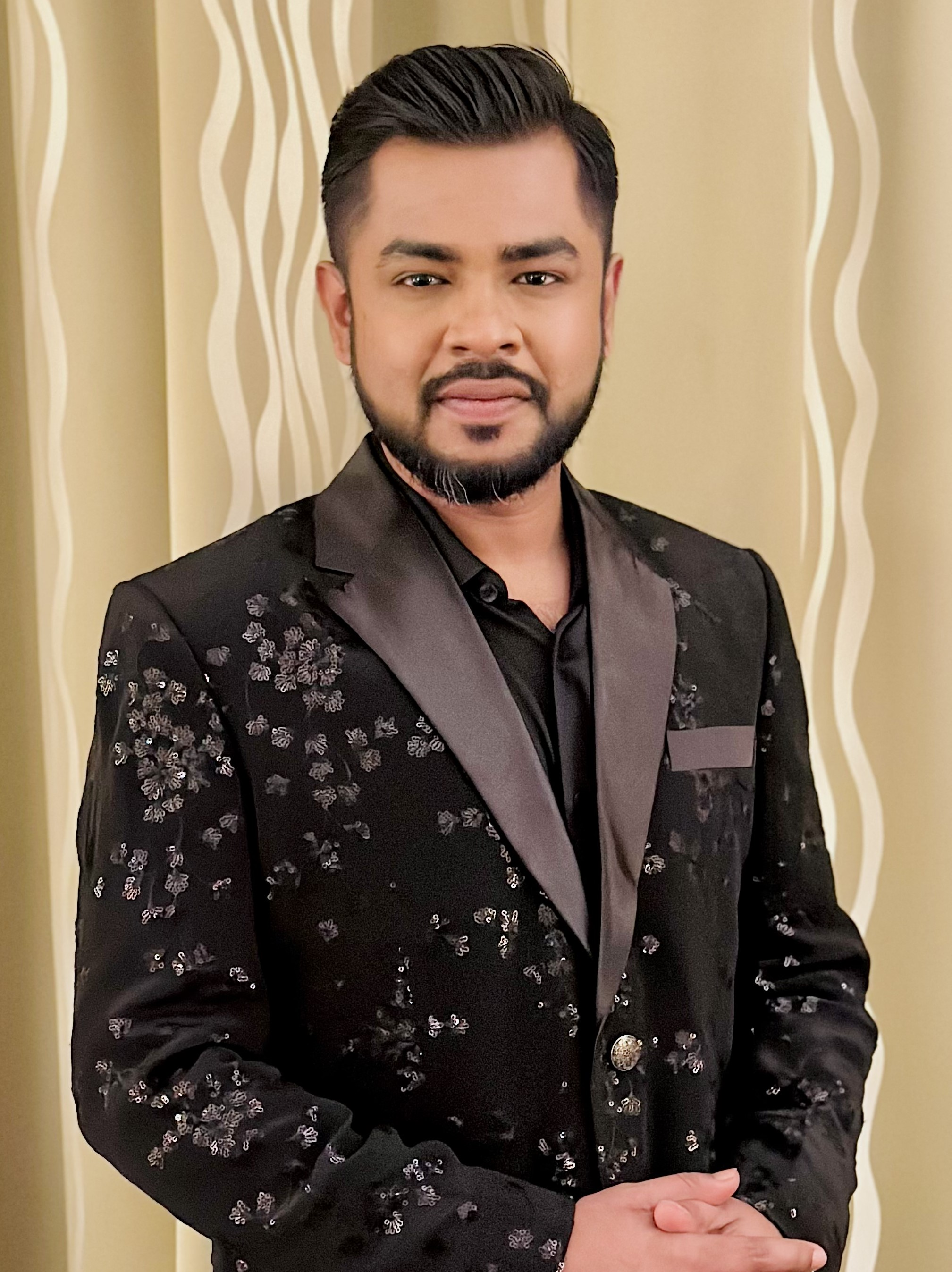
- Shwapnil Shojib in 2023

Background information
- Born: Bangladesh
- Genres: Rabindra Sangeet; Folk music; Independent music
- Occupations: Singer; actor; anchor
- Years active: 1998–present
- Labels: CD Choice: G Series Music; Eagle Music; Gaanchill Music; Dhruba Music; Saregama Music; CMV Music

Shwapnil Shojib (born 1991) is a Bangladeshi singer, actor, and anchor. He is known for Rabindra Sangeet, folk music and independent music. His full name is Sharif Md Sojib. He was a child virtuoso and has received several national awards. His first stage performance was at the age of five, alongside his aunt. He is also a popular news anchor of Bangladeshi Channel i. He is a listed singer of Bangladesh Betar and BTV. Shwapnil was the first official entry for North American Bengali Conference (NABC) in 2015 from Bangladesh. His first solo album, THE TAGORE TREASURY for G Series, was produced by Agniveena. After that, he released singles "Neel Otol", "Bhanga Goray Rabindranath", "Amar Mukti", "Sunil Sagore" etc.

== Career ==
Shwapnil learnt classical vocal from his aunt, Lutfun Nahar Lata. He also received a classical and Loghu Shangeet training from singer Ustad Ali Imam Chowdhuri. He has received his diploma in music from Bangladesh Shilpakala Academy, Faridpur. He learnt Rabindrasangeet under the tutelage of Rabindrasangeet singer Rezwana Choudhury Bannya. He also studied at Chhayanaut. His debut album was released in 2012 by G Series.

== Discography ==
Year	Song Title	Co-Artist	Ref.
2016	"Tumi Kon Kanoner Phool"	Iman Chakraborty	
2016	"Ektuku Chowa Lage"	Jayati Chakraborty	
2018	"The Dreamer"		
2018	"Khoyeri Bikel"	Iman Chakraborty	
2019	"Aji Jhoro Jhoro Mukhoro Badoro Dine"	Srabani Sen	
2019	"Parina Shamlate"	Dola	
2019	"Mojo Ekusher Gaan"	Protik Hasan, Nadia Dora, Zakiya Sultana Kornia	
2020	"Anonder Gaan"		
2020	"Tere Mere Milan"	Tamanna Prome	
2021	"Milon Hobe Koto Dine"	Shafi Mondol	
2022	"Mongolobarota"	Rezwana Choudhury Bannya	
2023	"Kabhi Kabhi Mere Dil Mein"	Priyangbada Banerjee	
2023	"Buke Prem"	Nikhita Gandhi	
2023	"Tribute To Tagore (Bodhu Michhe Raag Korona)"	Vishwa Mohan Bhatt	
2024	"Bhalobeshe Shokhi"		
2024	"Tumi Robe Nirobe"	Iman Chakraborty	

== Awards ==
- Babisas Award 2018
- Nepal International Iconic Award 2021
- Bangladesh International Fame Award (BIFA) 2022
- Won "Prothom Maan" Rabindra Shangeet arranged by Jatiyo Rabindra Shangeet Shommilon Porisod, Bangladesh in junior group in 2007.
- Won first prize in Rabindra Shangeet arranged by National University of Bangladesh in year 2009.
- "Jatiyo Shishu Purushkar" in Rabindra Sangeet, 1998
- Shera Bangali and Bongoratna Shomannona 2022
- Global Music Award, Dubai for "Khoyeri Bikel" 2018
- Iconic Award (Best Singer) 2022
- Gold Medals at "Jatiyo Shikkha Shoptaho" 2000 & 2001 in Rabindra Shangeet.
- Iconic Star & Fashion Award
- 'Best Rabindra Sangeet Artiste' at Ananda Mela award 2023
- 21st Tele Cine Award-2024, India (Best Singer)
- Honored by the New York State Senate, USA for contributions to music 2024
- Acknowledged by the Mayor and Council of Franklin Township, Somerset County, New Jersey, for cultural impact 2025
