= Jnanadanandini Devi =

Indian writer

Jnanadanandini Tagore
- জ্ঞানদানন্দিনী দেবী
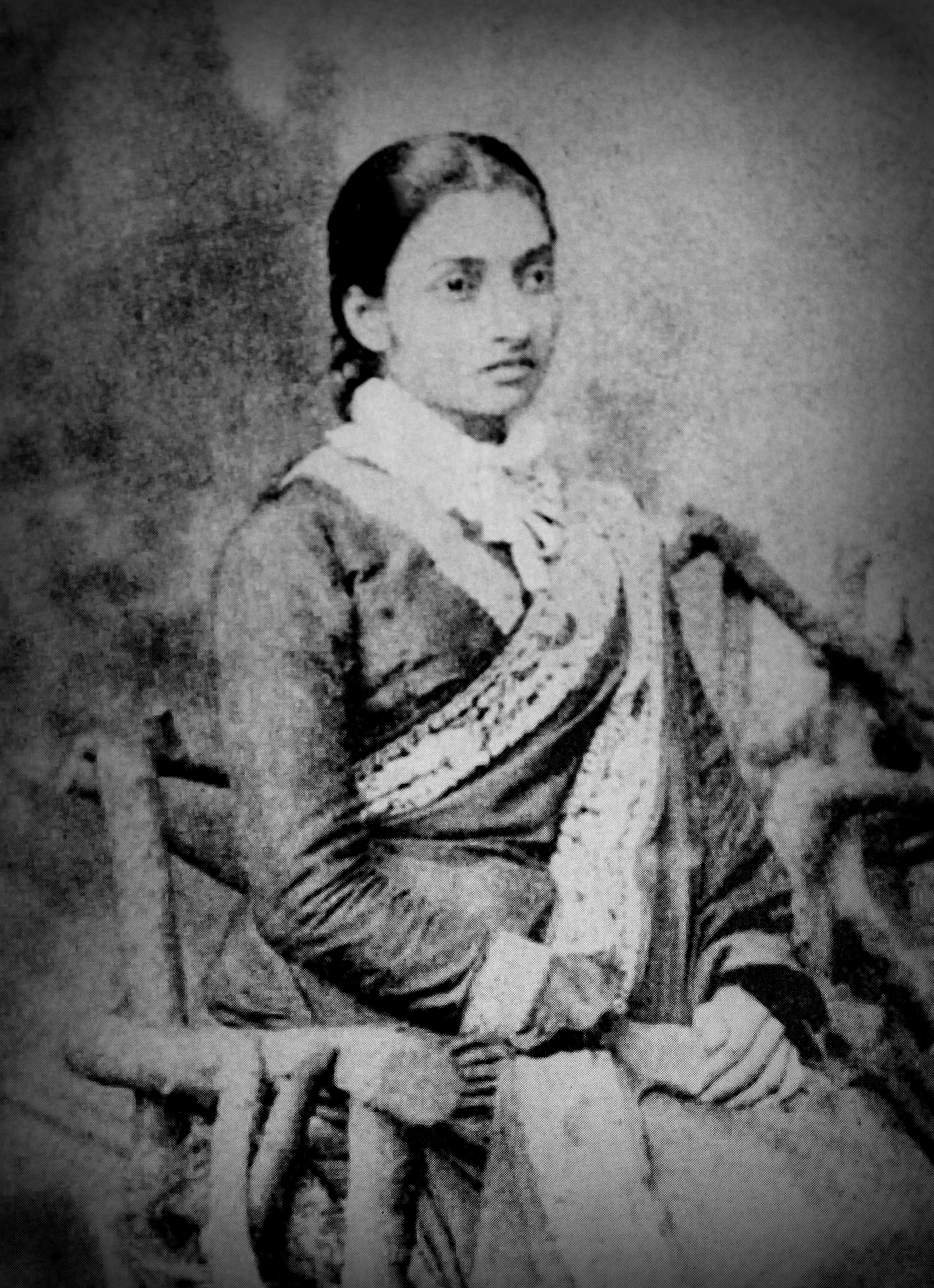
- Born: Jnanadanandini Mukhopadhyay; 26 July 1850; Jashore, Bengal, British India
- Died: 1 October 1941 (aged 91); Calcutta
- Occupation: Writer
- Spouse: Satyendranath Tagore
- Children: Surendranath Tagore (son); Indira Devi Choudhurani (daughter)
- Family: Tagore family

Jnanadanandini Tagore (pronounced Bengali: [gjanodanondini ˈʈʰakuɾ] (née Mukhopadhyay; 26 July 1850 – 1 October 1941) was a British Indian writer. She was married to Satyendranath Tagore, a scion of the Jorasanko Tagore family. She is known today for developing a unique style of sari, the Brahmika sari, based on both the traditional Bengali style, with elements from Gujarati and Parsi style drapes she encountered while living in Bombay (Mumbai).

== Early life ==
Jnanadanandini was born to parents Abhaycharan Mukhopadhyay and Nistarini Devi of Narendrapur village in Jessore, Bengal Presidency (Bangladesh). Abhaycharan, a Kulin Brahmin, became an out-caste by marrying into a Pirali family and was disinherited by his father. In accordance to the prevalent custom, Jnanadanandini was married at the young age of seven or eight to Debendranath Tagore's second son, Satyendranath in 1857. In contrast to her idyllic life in Jessore, she found herself confined behind the strict purdah of the Tagore household at Jorasanko. In 1862, while pursuing his probationary training for the Indian Civil Service (ICS), Satyendranath asked for Jnanadanandini to join him in England, however his father did not consent. Around this time, Jnanadanandini's brother-in-law Hemendranath Tagore took charge of her education. She was also tutored briefly by the famous Brahmo educationist Ayodhyanath Pakrashi. Upon Satyendranath's return from England in 1864 as the first Indian member of the Civil Service, Jnanadanandini went to live with her husband in Bombay, Pune and Bijapur.

== Bombay ==
While in Bombay, Jnanadanandini socialized in the European circles and partly adapted to English customs. This shift in social role required her to dress appropriately, for which the traditional Bengali style of wearing the sari became too unwieldy. During a tour of Gujarat with her husband, Jnanadanandini improvised upon the sari worn by Parsi women. She created her own style of draping the aanchal/pallu over the left shoulder – as opposed to the Parsi style – so that the right hand remained free for courtesies. She even advertised in the monthly magazine Bamabodhini Patrika offering to train other women to wear the sari in her novel style. One of her first pupils in Calcutta was Mrs. Soudamini Gupta, the wife of Behari Lal Gupta, ICS. The style soon became popular among the Brahmo women of Calcutta developing the eponym Brahmika Sari. While in Calcutta, Jnanadanandini, breaking the customs of the upper-caste household, accompanied her husband to a Christmas party thrown by the Viceroy, Lord Lawrence in 1866. Prasanna Coomar Tagore of Pathuriaghata, who was also among the invitees was deeply outraged by Jnanadanandini's boldness and left the viceregal palace in shock. Her father-in-law, Debendranath Tagore did not take kindly to her independent spirit either. It is speculated that this caused much discord in the Tagore household. Jnanadanandini left Jorasanko in 1868 to live by herself in a mansion on Park Street, adjacent to Debendranath's residence. In spite of this proximity, the two of them never interacted. However, around this time she developed a fondness for her younger brother-in-law, Rabindranath Tagore, who became a frequent visitor in her Park Street house. Jnanadanandini returned to Bombay with her husband in 1869. The same year she lost her first child within a few days of birth. Her son, Surendranath was born in 1872 while the couple was living in Poona and the following year, her daughter Indira Devi was born in Bijapur (now in Karnataka). In yet another undaunted act of courage, Jnanadanandini appointed a Muslim woman as wet nurse for her children. In those days it was common for affluent Hindu families to leave their newborns to the care of a wet nurse or governess, but always a Hindu. However, Jnanadanandini resented leaving her children in the custody of servants—often against the wishes of her own husband—making evident the emotional contours of a nuclear family that were already beginning to evolve in her mind. Her third son Kabindranath was born in 1876(?) during the family's brief sojourn in Hyderabad, Sindh.

== England ==
In 1877, Jnanadanandini Devi set sail for England. At a time when an Indian woman crossing the seas was unheard of—let alone heavily pregnant, with three children and unaccompanied by her husband—her fortitude created a social sensation. She was received in London by her husband's uncle Gnanendramohan Tagore who, in spite of being the first Asian barrister and a Christian convert, shared in the shock. After briefly residing at Gnanendramohan Tagore's house in Kensington Gardens, Jnanadanandini moved into a house on Medina Villas in the seaside town of Brighton, Sussex. Satyendranath joined her in England with the onset of his furlough in October 1878, along with his younger brother Rabindranath Tagore. Her initial year in England was marked by grief with the birth of a stillborn child, and the demise of her youngest son Kabindranath. She arranged for Kabindranath to be buried beside Dwarakanath Tagore's grave at Kensal Green Cemetery in London. However, she and her children soon developed an intimate friendship with Rabindranath. Her daughter Indira would eventually become Rabindranath's lifelong confidante. Upon the completion of Satyendranath's furlough, he took up a post in Surat while Jnanadanandini returned to Calcutta with her children.

== Calcutta ==
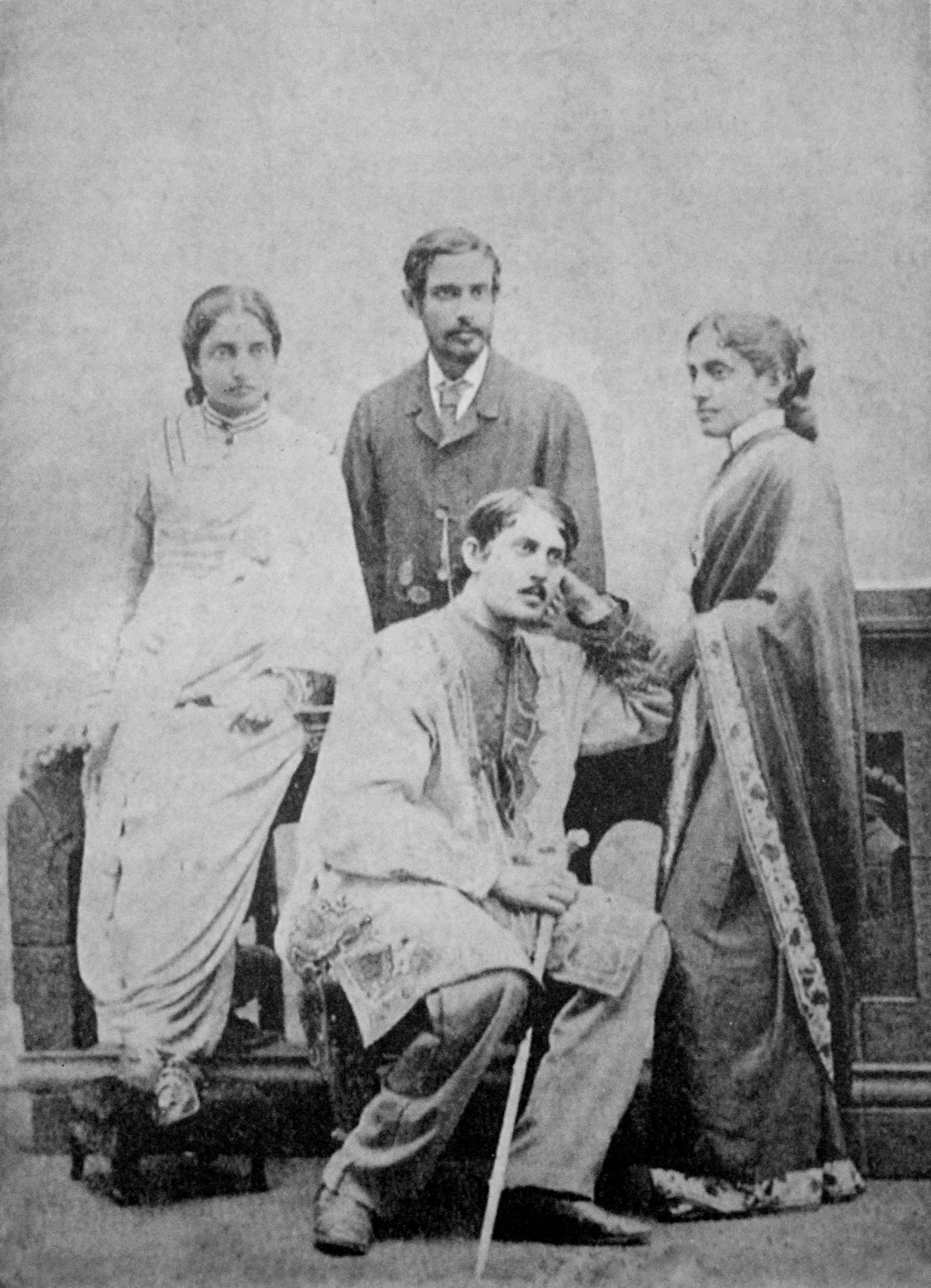
Standing L-R: Jnanadanandini Devi, Satyendranath Tagore, Kadambari Devi. Seated: Jyotirindranath Tagore

In Calcutta, Jnanadanandini took up residence in a bungalow on Lower Circular Road. Yet, from the memoirs of her daughter Indira and niece Sarala, we learn that Jnanadanandini never relinquished her attachment with the Tagore's Jorasanko house. She took an active role in Rabindranath's marriage and even mentored the young bride, Mrinalini. With time, her relationship with Rabindranath permeated into the domain of his creativity. Jnanadanandini started assisting him with the performance of his plays, often encouraging other women of the household to participate. Thus came: Valmiki-Pratibha, Kaalmrigaya, Raja O Rani, Mayar Khela and Bisarjan. From Indira Devi's recollection we also learn that in spite of her high standing, Jnanadanandini did not socialize with the Calcutta glitterati of her time. That Calcutta society was not favourably disposed towards Jnanadanandini either is evident from an article in the October 1889 issue of the popular Bengali journal Bangabasi, which slandered her for acting in the play Raja O Rani. Ironically, the Tagore house at Birjitalao where the performance took place is today occupied by a ritzy gentlemen's club.

"My aunt Gyanada, brought with her from Britain a new custom called 'Birthday'. We had never heard of this strange celebration before. In fact most of us did not even know when we were born. Once, after returning from Suren's birthday party, I distinctly remember the frenzy among the Jorasanko children – and not just the children – of finding out when they were born. Our westernized family, of course, promptly took to the idea as did the Brahmo Samaj. And lo and behold, before long the whole country was celebrating their birthdays."

— Sarala Devi Chaudhurani, Jeebaner Jharapata

In 1890, Jnanadanandini moved in with Jyotirindranath Tagore who had lost his wife Kadambari Devi in 1884. In 1891, Jnanadanandini Devi introduced her nephew Abanindranath Tagore to E.B. Havell who at the time was the principal of Government College of Art. The collaboration between these two artists would eventually lead to the development of the Bengal School of Art. Jnanadanandini's position in the Tagore family is difficult to situate. On the one hand, she is among the few women who presided over the Maghotsav celebrations at the Brahmo Samaj, while on the other she is known to have advocated marriage with the non-Brahmin Cooch-Behar royal family which brought her at loggerheads, yet again, with Debendranath Tagore. A woman who once went to England just by herself did not allow her son Surendranath to go to England for higher studies. Her maternal anxieties notwithstanding, she never objected to Surendranath's many radical misadventures. While she single-handedly nursed Rabindranath's daughter Meera Devi through her difficult pregnancy in 1911, she also fell out with him over the issue of withdrawing her grandson Subirendranath from Santiniketan ashram in 1921. Yet, her relationship with Rabindranath remained untarnished all her life. In the words of her daughter Indira Devi, "my mother had ... a quality of centrality, that is the power of attracting people around her, owing to her hospitable and hearty nature".

In 1907, Jnanadanandini and Satyendranath visited Jyotirindranath Tagore in his house at Morabadi Hill in Ranchi and started living there permanently from 1911. She died in 1941.

== Literary accomplishments ==
Among the Tagore family women, after Swarnakumari Devi, Jnanadanandini participated most actively in the rich literary ambiance of the family. Upon her return from England in 1880, Jnanadanandini began writing articles in the Bengali journal Bharati. Her flair was soon noticed by the intelligentsia. In 1881 - four years before the establishment of the Indian National Congress - Jnanadanandini published an article titled Ingrajninda O Deshanurag (Criticism of the British and Patriotism), in which she called for the establishment of a nationwide organization which would have branches in the remote district towns. She argued "every benefit that the British have bestowed upon us is a blow to our mission of national liberation". In 1885, Jnanadanandini Devi established Balak, the first children's literary magazine in Bengali. Rabindranath contributed a number of short stories, poems and plays to Balak. She wrote two plays for children - Takdumadum and Saat Bhai Champa - both of which were highly appreciated in the literary circles. In spite of her many literary achievements, Jnanadanandini Devi did not write an autobiography. However, a couple of years before her death, Pulinbihari Sen did persuade her to write a set of memoirs that were later published as Smritikatha O Puratani.
