= Sangit Bhavana =

School associated with Visva Bharati University

- Visva-Bharati University
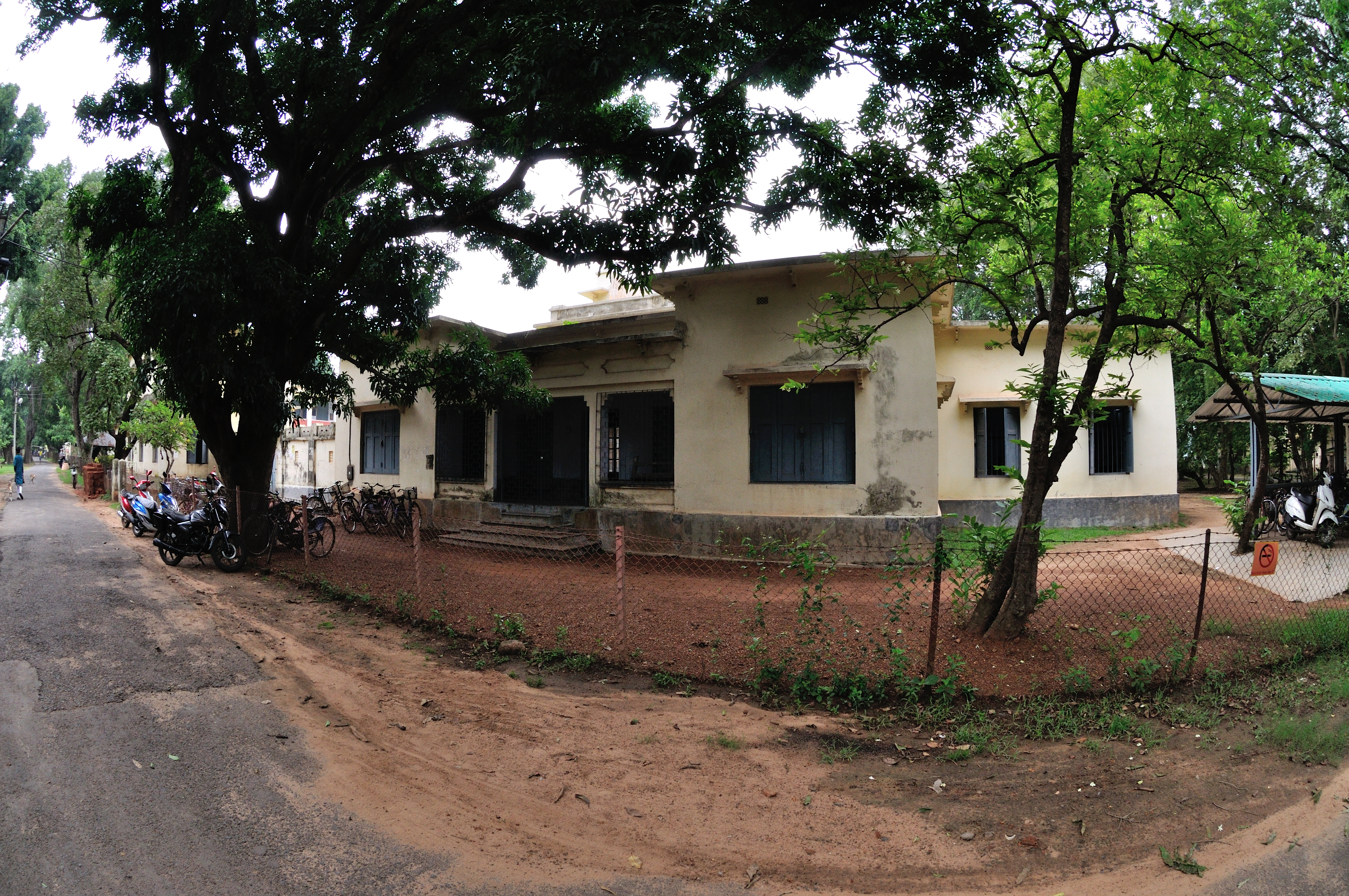
- Sangit Bhavana, Santiniketan
- Location: Santiniketan, West Bengal, India
- Coordinates: 23.68101°N 87.68183°E
- Founder: Rabindranath Tagore
- Established: 1933
- Principal: Prof. Nikhil Chowdhury
- Website: visvabharati.ac.in/sangitbhavana

Sangit Bhavana (Institute of Dance, Drama and Music), of Visva-Bharati University, Santiniketan, started functioning as a part of Kala Bhavana in 1919 and as a separate institution in 1933. It was established by the Nobel laureate Rabindranath Tagore.

== Overview ==
The Statesman writes, "Like the fine arts, music was an important part of the curriculum taught at Tagore's school. For the Santiniketan community, his songs were a constant source of joy and solace. They were integral to each aspect of Santiniketan's unique way of life and cultural identity. Not surprisingly, the teaching of music and dance received a fresh impetus when Visva-Bharati was founded. A new musical tradition evolved under the guidance of stalwarts like Dinendranath Tagore, Rabindranath's musician grandnephew, and Pandit Bhimrao Hasurkar Sastri, a versatile Maharashtrian musician who taught Hindustani classical music.

"Simultaneously, a new style of dance was created through experimentation with styles borrowed from various traditions and cultures. Traditional Manipuri and Kathakali styles and also non-Indian dance forms such as the Ceylonese Kandy dance were incorporated into this new dance style that had an identity of its own. Such syncretism was a hallmark of Visva- Bharati's distinctive cultural outlook.

"Santiniketan revolutionized Bengali and, by extension, Indian perceptions of culture by challenging social prejudices against the performing arts. The students broke a taboo when they began to participate in performances on the public stage. In short, in Santiniketan the performing arts gained a new respectability."

== History ==
Rabindranath's school, Brahmacharyasrama, at Santiniketan, was formally opened on 22 December 1901. Music was an important part of the curriculum right from the beginning, but the music taught was limited to Rabindra Sangit. In 1919, when Kala Bhavana first started functioning, it taught both music and art. In 1933, the two streams were separated with individual institutes for each stream - Kala Bhavana and Sangit Bhavana.

Dinendranath Tagore, grandson of Dwijendranath Tagore, the poet's eldest brother, was brought up in the culturally rich environment of Jorasanko Thakur Bari and was a talented musician familiar with both Hindustani classical music and music in western culture. He was particularly good with musical notations and was in-charge of the music department from the earliest years. Bhimrao Hasurkar Sastri introduced the teaching of Hindustani classical music in Santiniketan. He was the second adhakshya of the music department from 1923 to 1927. Thereafter, Dinendra Nath Tagore once again took over charge.

Bhatkhande Music Institute set up by renowned musicologist and pioneer in classical music training, Vishnu Narayan Bhatkhande, in Lucknow, provided well-trained Hindusthani classical music acharyas to Visva Bharati for many years.

The association of music with the courtesans in those days somewhat damaged its reputation as an art form, and Rabindranath's experiments with the art of dance at Santiniketan were initially received with opposition and criticism from the then existing orthodox society.

In 1919, Rabindranath decided to include Manipuri dance in the curriculum of Santiniketan after witnessing a dance performance in Sylhet. He requested Birendra Kishore Manikya, the king of Tripura, to send a Manipuri dance teacher and the latter sent Rajkumar Buddhimanta Singh to Santiniketan. Later, Nileswar Mukherjee of Bhanugach also joined Santiniketan as a teacher of Manipuri dance.

Rabindranath Tagore was attracted to Kathakali mainly as a result of its rhythmic dance components like kalasam and sari, with only a veneer of gestural abhinaya. He sent Santideb Ghosh, twice to South India to get in touch with Kerala Kalamandalam. In 1939 Poet Vallathol visited Santiniketan. Rabindranath requested him to send a Kathakali teacher to Santiniketan. Santideb Ghosh again visited Kerala for the purpose. Guru Kelu Nair was the first Kathakali teacher at Santiniketan from 1937 to 1941. Subsequently, Haridasan Nair, Balakrishnan Menon, Keshava Poduval, Unni Krishna Kuruppu and Mohan Krishnan Poduval were some of the eminent teachers at Santiniketan for Kathakali dance. In later years, Kalamandalam Govindan Kutty was associated with both Kolkata and Santiniketan.

== The institute overview ==
Eminent names in the musical arena such as Dinendranath Tagore, Bhimrao Hasurkar Sastri, Indira Devi Chaudhurani, Santidev Ghosh, Sushil Kumar Bhanja Choudhuri and Sailajaranjan Majumdar laid down rich traditions in earlier years. In later years the traditions were upheld by such persons as Kanika Banerjee and Nilima Sen.

In addition to those who studied at Santineiketan and remained back as notable teachers, some of the students who have emerged as popular singers, beyond Santiniketan, are: Suchitra Mitra, Subinoy Roy, Sumitra Guha and Rezwana Chowdhury Bannya.

Sangit Bhavana "focuses on the realms of music and dance. The courses vary from PG to undergraduate study and from diplomas to certificate courses. Almost all forms and styles of Indian music and dance are dealt with under one roof." Sangit Bhavana imparts training in Rabindra Sangit, Hindusthani classical vocal and instrumental music (esraj, sitar, tabla, pakhvaj), Manipuri and Kathakali dance styles, dramas and Tagore's own musical dance-dramas. For exceptionally talented post-graduates, there is scope for research.

== In popular culture and in history ==
- Mrinalini Sarabhai (then Mrinalini Swaminathan, 20 years old), studied Kathakali under Guru Kelu Nair and Manipuri under Guru Ambui Singh. An extremely creative person she was always on the look out for new forms in traditional techniques to express herself. When Tagore gave her the leading role in his dance drama Chandalika she was thrilled, more so because she had to do the Bharatnatyam choreography by her-self. ‘Dance it as you wish,’ Tagore said. It was the first time that Bharatnatyam was introduced in Tagore's dance drama.
- The Kandyan dance of Ceylon and the dance-dramas of Java and Bali represented the 'Asian mind' for Tagore. The hybrid form of Tagore's dance drama developed over time. Pratima Devi called it a product of ‘chemical synthesis’ of several traditional Asian dance forms and modern European dance. Kathakali and Manipuri formed the base and there were additives from the modern European styles of Rudolf Laban, Kurt Jooss and Mary Wigman. Tagore's niece Shrimati Tagore brought in many of these to Santiniketan after training in Europe for three years. A Japanese dancer named Maki had choreographed Chitrangada
- Tagore's music was a blend of different genres and many of his compositions were sung in Western classical mode also. Two Ashramites, Allen Danielu and Arthur Gedes, presented Tagore's lyrics in English, set to his tunes, and rendered in western style with piano as accompaniment.
- Manoj and Manisha Murali Nair, a brother and sister duo, have produced 10 Rabindra Sangit albums until now. They are children of Kalamandalam Murlidharan Nair, the Kathakali guru at Visva Bharati.
- Rabindranath's timeless song Purano shei diner katha has its roots in Scotland. It was inspired by Auld Lang Syne (Long long ago) by the Scottish poet and lyricist Robert Burns. Several other Tagore songs have a similar history. In 2011, the Scottish government set up a Centre for Tagore Studies at Napier University in Edinburgh. In January 2019, Visva Bharati organised a special programme on Rabindranath and Robert Burns.

See also - Special programme on Rabindranath Tagore and Scottish poet Robert Burns

- Pallavi Krishnan, leading Mohiniyattam exponent completed her graduation in dance (Kathakali) from Santiniketan and then did her post graduation in Mohiniyattam from Kerala Kalamandalam.

== See also ==
- Notable people associated with Santiniketan
