= Satyendranath Tagore =

First Indian ICS officer

Satyendranath Tagore সত্যেন্দ্রনাথ ঠাকুর
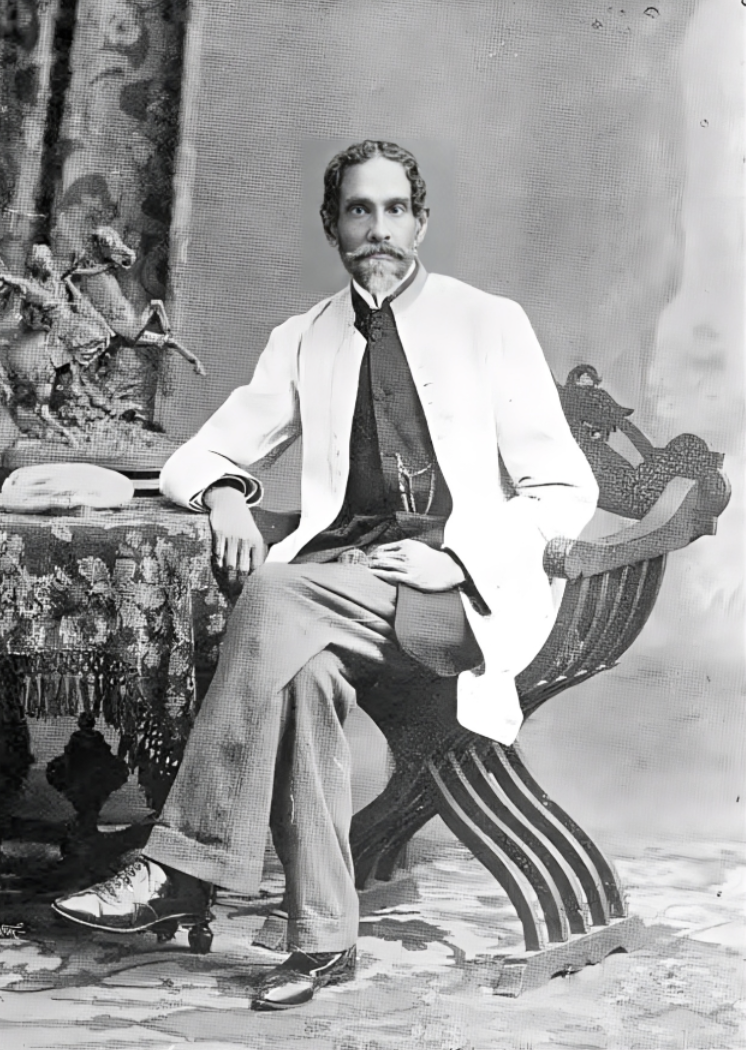
- Satyendranath Tagore c.1863
- Born: 1 June 1842; Calcutta, Bengal, British India (now Kolkata, India)
- Died: 9 January 1923 (aged 80); Calcutta, Bengal, British India
- Education: Presidency College, Kolkata
- Occupations: Civil servant, poet, composer, writer, social reformer & linguist
- Organization: Brahmo Samaj
- Known for: First Indian to be an ICS officer (present-day equivalent to IAS officer), Indian feminist movement
- Predecessor: Debendranath Tagore
- Successor: Surendranath Tagore
- Spouse: Jnanadanandini Devi
- Children: Surendranath Tagore (son); Indira Devi Chaudhurani (daughter)
- Parents: Debendranath Tagore (father); Sarada Sundari Devi (mother)
- Relatives: Dwijendranath, Hemendranath, Jyotirindranath Tagore, Swarnakumari, Rabindranath Tagore (siblings) +9 others
- Family: Tagore family

Satyendranath Tagore (1 June 1842 – 9 January 1923) was an Indian civil servant, poet, composer, writer, social reformer and linguist from Calcutta, Bengal. He was the first Indian who became an Indian Civil Service officer in 1863. He was a member of Bramho Samaj.

== Biography ==
He was born to Maharshi Debendranath Tagore and Sarada Devi on 1 June 1842 at Tagore family of Jorasanko in Kolkata. His wife was Jnanadanandini Devi. They had one son and one daughter, Surendranath Tagore and Indira Devi Chaudhurani. He was a student of Presidency College. He was the first Indian officer of Indian Civil Service (ICS). He joined the service in 1864. He retired from the Indian Civil Service on 15 January 1897

== Literary works ==
- Sushila O Birsingha
- Bombai Chitra
- Nabaratnamala
- Striswadhinata
- Bouddhadharma
- Amar Balyakotha O Bombai Prabas
- Bharatbarsiyo Ingrej
- Raja Rammohan Roy
- Birsingha
- Amar Balyakotha
- Atmakotha
- Shrimadbhagvatgita

He wrote many songs. His patriotic Bengali language song "Mile Sabe Bharat Santan, Ektan Gago Gaan" (unite, India's children, sing in unison), which was hailed as the first national anthem of India.

== Death ==
He died on 9 January 1923 in Kolkata.

== See also ==
- Tagore family
- List of Indian members of the Indian Civil Service
- List of Kolkata Presidencians
- Hindu Mela
- List of Bengali-language authors (alphabetical)
