= Surendranath Tagore =

Writer (1872–1940)

- Born: 1872; Bombay, Bombay Presidency, British India (now Mumbai, Maharashtra, India)
- Died: 1940 (aged 67–68)
- Citizenship: British Indian
- Occupations: Author, Scholar, Translator, Entrepreneur
- Parents: Satyendranath Tagore (father); Jnanadanandini Devi (mother)
- Relatives: Indira Devi Chaudhurani (sister); Sarada Sundari Devi and Debendranath Tagore (grandparents); Dwijendranath, Hemendranath, Jyotirindranath, Swarnakumari, Rabindranath Tagore (uncle and aunts) +9 others
- Family: Tagore family

Surendranath Tagore (1872–1940) was an Indian author, literary scholar, translator and entrepreneur. He is particularly noted for translating a number of works of Rabindranath Tagore to English.

== Early life and background ==
A member of the Tagore family of Calcutta, he was born to Satyendranath Tagore and Jnanadanandini Devi in Bombay in 1872. Surendranath's sister Indira Devi Choudhurani, born in 1873, was a noted littereaur, author and musician. He graduated from St Xavier's college, Calcutta in 1893, and at an early stage in his life he became involved in the Indian nationalist movement. He attended Bishop Cotton School, Shimla in 1881.

== Career ==
He was involved in supporting strike by railway workers in Bombay in 1899, and subsequently became involved in the Swadeshi movement in Bengal, in opposition to the 1905 partition of Bengal. Surendranath is also believed to have been involved in the early phase of revolutionary movement for Indian independence, when he served as the treasurer of the Anushilan Samiti established under Pramatha Mitra. Surendranath is credited with establishing a number of Indian-owned banks and insurance companies through which he sought to encourage indigenous industries. Surendranath's work in the initial stages of establishment of Visva-Bharati is considered crucial, and he sat in the university's publishing board. He also served as the editor of The Visva-Bharati Quarterly from the July 1923 up to April 1929.

Surendranath was influenced by his uncle Rabindranath from an early age which saw him develop an interest in literature. Surendranath's work include both his own creative work, as well as translations of Rabindranath's work from Bengali to English. Surendranath's own noted literary works included essays on various aspects of Science which were published in the magazines Sadhana and Bharati. He also contributed to Modern review, and Prabasi. Among the noted works in translations is his translations of Rabindranath's works The Home and the World (Ghare baire) in 1919, Glimpses of Bengal Selected from letters (Chinnapatra) in 1921, and Four chapters (Char adhyaye) in 1950 (published after his death). Surendranath Tagore died in 1940.
