= Chadpur =

- Village
- Village location on Varanasi district map Chadpur (Uttar Pradesh) Chadpur (India)
- Coordinates: 25.344841°N 83.108598°E
- Country: India
- State: Uttar Pradesh
- Elevation: 82 m (269 ft)

Population (2011)
  - Total: 3,584

Languages
  - Official: Hindi
- Time zone: UTC+5:30 (IST)
- PIN: 221112
- STD: 0542
- Vehicle registration: UP65 XXXX
- Village code: 209722
- Website: up.gov.in

Chadpur is a village in Varanasi tehsil, Varanasi district in the Indian state of Uttar Pradesh. It is about 324 kilometers from the state capital Lucknow and 812 kilometers from the national capital Delhi.

== Demography ==
Chadpur has a total population of 3,584 people amongst 499 families. Sex ratio of Chadpur is 899 and child sex ratio is 876. Uttar Pradesh state average for both ratios is 912 and 902 respectively^{[note]}.

| Details | Male | Female | Total | Comments |
|---|---|---|---|---|
| Number of houses | - | - | 499 | (census 2011) |
| Adult | 1,597 | 1,443 | 3,040 | (census 2011) |
| Children (0–6 years) | 290 | 254 | 544 | (census 2011) |
| Total population | 1,887 | 1,697 | 3,584 | (census 2011) |
| Literacy | 84.03% | 66.04% | 75.49% | (census 2011) |

== Transportation ==
Chadpur can be accessed by road only as it does not have a railway station. Closest railway station to this village is Varanasi railway station (16 km). Nearest operational airports are Varanasi airport (33 kilometers) and Allahabad Airports (150 kilometers).

== Notes ==
- All demographic data is based on 2011 Census of India.
