= Nilima Sen =

Nilima Sen নীলিমা সেন
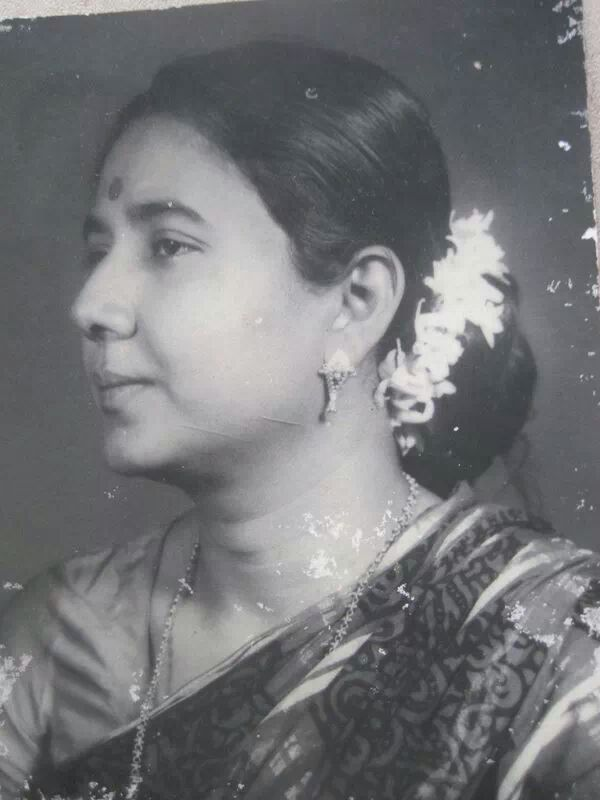

Background information
- Born: Nilma Gupta; 28 April 1928; Calcutta, Bengal Presidency, British India
- Died: 28 June 1996 (Age 68) Calcutta, West Bengal, India
- Genres: Playback singing, Rabindrasangeet
- Occupation: Singer
- Years active: 1944–1996

Nilima Sen (28 April 1928 – 28 June 1996) was a famous Rabindrasangeet singer. She was a faculty member at the Visva Bharati University.

== Early life ==
Nilima was born as Nilima Gupta in Kolkata, India on 28 April 1928. Her parents moved to Shantiniketan when she was six. She had her education there and completed diploma course in Classical Music & Rabindra Sangeet from Santiniketan. She also did her B.A from the Visva-Bharati University at Santiniketan. She had the privilege of acting under the direction of Tagore but that was not staged. She sang in the presence of Gandhiji, Subhash Bose etc. during their visit to Santiniketan. Her Guru was mainly Sailajaranjan Majumdar.

She started singing at the AIR and cut her first disc at the age of 16 and soon became famous. In 1950, she married Dr Amiya Kumar Sen and settled in Santiniketan. She has a daughter Nilanjana who also is a singer. She visited US with her husband and performed at various centres including BBC.

She founded the music school "Surangama" along with Prasad Sen and later joined the Sangit Bhavana of Visva Bharati University as a Faculty. For a couple of years, she taught music at Bardhhaman University. She became the Principal of Sangit Bhavana & retired from there. As a Faculty, she took part in various dance dramas like Tasher Desh, Mayar Khela (along with Suchitra Mitra), Sesh Raksha (along with Supriyo Tagore) organised by Visva Bharati & staged at auditoriums like Rabindra Sadan, New Empire Kolkata. Songs like "Chokher jaler laglo joar", "Aha tomar sange", "Bajao re mohan banshi" found correct expression through the embedded sadness in her voice.

She performed all over India, Bangladesh, UK, US, Burma & Malaysia. Her famous students include Swastika Mukhopadhyay, Lily Islam, Basabi Datta, Rezwana Chowdhury Banya, Rita Ghosh, Pramita Mallick, Jayanti Purkayastha, Soma Roy, Aditi Mohsin etc.

She has a number of music albums to her credit.

She died in 1996 after a prolonged illness.

== Recordings ==
In 2004, Saregama re-released four singles by Nilima Sen: "Khelar Saathi, Bidaydwar", "Raja (Drama)", "Tomari Madhur Rupe Bhorechho Bhuban" and "Tumi Bandhu Tumi Nath".

In 2005, Saregama released "ki ragini bajale"-some 21 of her songs in a collection
