= Dinendranath Tagore =

Bengali musician, singer and poet

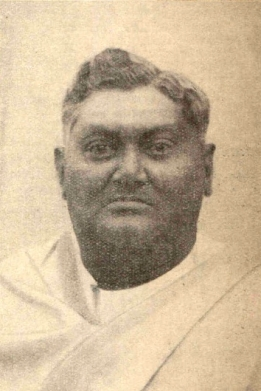
- Born: 16 December 1882; Jorasanko.Calcutta, British India
- Died: 21 July 1935 (aged 52); Calcutta, British India
- Occupations: Musician and poet
- Spouse(s): Binapani Devi (m.1897); Kamala Devi (m.1902)

Dinendranath Tagore (16 December 1882– 21 July 1935), also known as Dinu Thakur, was a Bengali musician, singer and poet.

He codified many of the tunes that would appear impetuously to Rabindranath. He served as principal of Visva-Bharati's Music school, Sangit Bhavana for its opening years. He was the first person who introduced the songs of Tagore as the name of Rabindra Sangeet.

== Biography ==
Dinendranath was son of Sushila Devi and Dwipendranath Tagore, Grandson of Dwijendranath Tagore, the eldest brother of Rabindranath and was born into the culturally rich environment of the Jorasanko Thakur Bari of the Tagore family. He was particularly well-trained in Hindustani classical music, and many early Rabindra Sangeet renderings in his baritone voice can be found in archives and recordings. For recording the melodies, he primarily used the sargam notation newly formalised by Pandit Vishnu Narayan Bhatkhande, but he was equally well versed in the Western staff notation. Many Ashramites and contemporaries recall that whenever a particularly haunting note was thought by Rabindranath, he always looked around for Dinu to have it noted. Perhaps for this reason, he was affectionately and respectfully called "Amar gaaner bhandari" [the keeper of my songs] by Rabindranath himself. Dinendranath could play a number of Eastern and Western musical instruments also, notable being the esraj and piano.

He was also involved with a number of dance dramas of Tagore, including a tour performing Taser Desh (Land of cards) to Bombay in 1933. He also composed the music for the film Natir Puja in 1932.
