= Indira Devi Chaudhurani =

Bengali literary figure, author and musician, born to the Tagore family

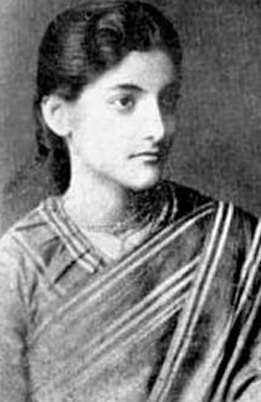
- Indira Devi Chaudhurani c.1890
- Born: 29 December 1873; Calcutta, Bengal, British India (now Kolkata, India)
- Died: 12 August 1960 (aged 86); Calcutta, West Bengal, India
- Occupations: Musician; writer; translator
- Spouse: Pramatha Chaudhuri
- Parents: Satyendranath Tagore (father); Jnanadanandini Devi (mother)
- Family: Rabindranath Tagore (uncle)

Indira Devi Chaudhurani (29 December 1873 – 12 August 1960) was an Indian literary figure, author and musician. Born to the Tagore family, Indira was the younger child of Satyendranath Tagore and Jnanadanandini Devi and younger sister of Surendranath Tagore. She is noted for her work in scoring the music for a number of songs by her uncle Rabindranath, with whom she was particularly close. She died in 1960.

== Biography ==
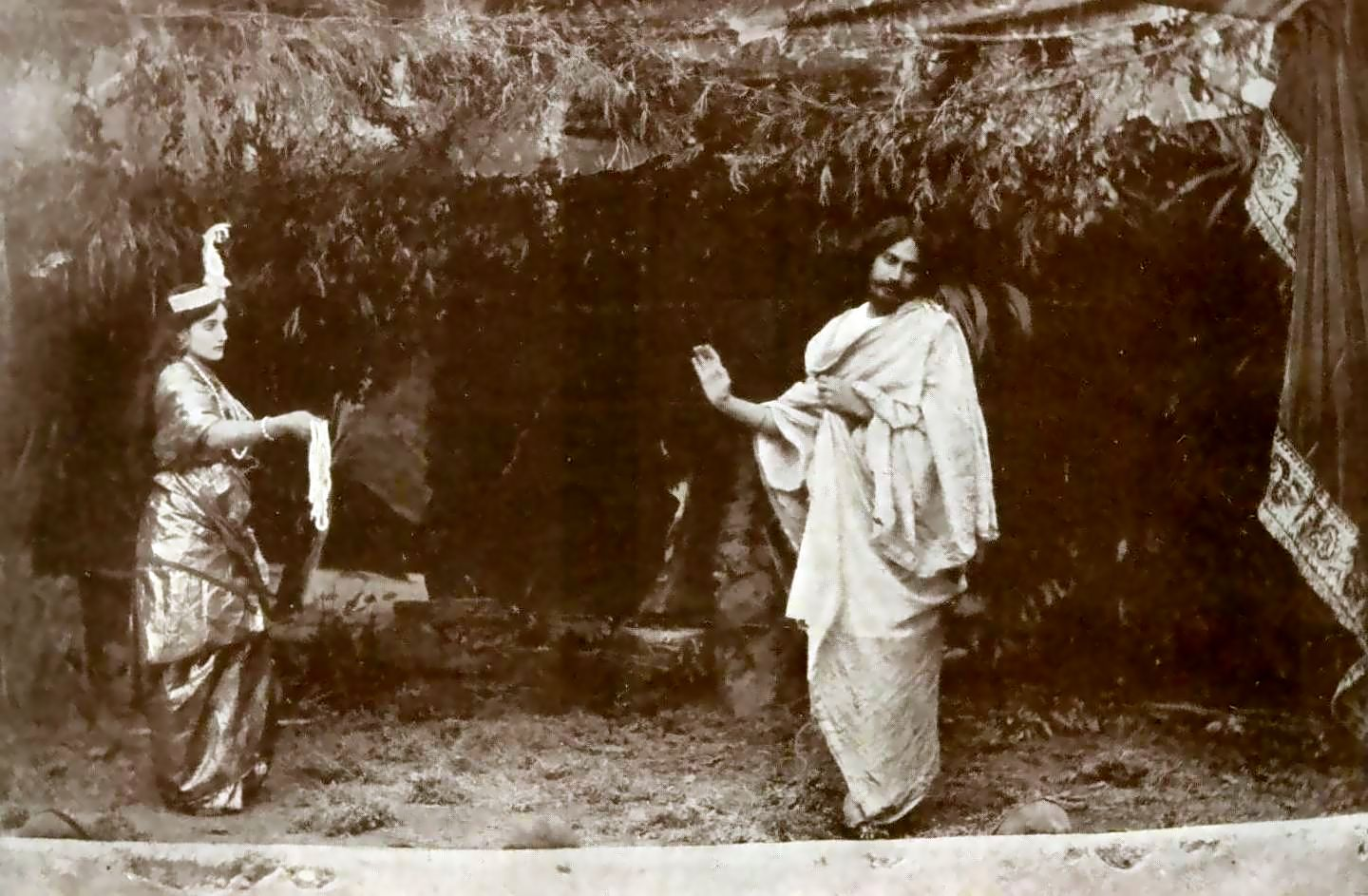
Indira with her uncle Rabindranath Tagore, in Valmiki-Pratibha, c.1881

Indira Devi was born on 29 December 1873 to Satyendranath Tagore and Jnanadanandini Devi in 1873, at Bijapur. She spent her childhood in England, in Brighton where her family owned the Medina Villas. At this time she and her brother Surendranath came to be very close to her uncle Rabindranath who joined them a year later, and the brother and sister were said to have been the favourite of among the poet's nephews and nieces, and the author's letters to Indira were later published as Chinnapatra. Her early education was in India, at Auckland House in Simla and the Loreto Convent in Calcutta. In 1892, Indira graduated from Calcutta University with a First Class Honours in French. Indira translated into Bengali the works of John Ruskin, as well as French literature, and translated published translations of Rabindranath's works in English. Indira was a strong proponent of women's issues, and authored a number of works on the position of women in India.

Indira took an early interest in music, achieving proficiency in piano, violin and the sitar and training in both Indian classical music as well as Western classical music, later earning a diploma from Trinity College of Music. She is noted to have scored the music for almost two hundred of Tagore's songs. She was a composer of Brahmosangeet, and also authored a number of essays on music. In later life, Indira Devi was instrumental in the establishment of Sangit Bhavana at Visva-Bharati University, and served as the chancellor of the University for a brief period of time.

Indira was awarded Bhuvanmohini Gold Medal from Calcutta University in 1944, and received Desikottam (D.Litt.) from Visva Bharati University in 1957. Indira wed Pramatha Chaudhury in 1899.
