= Guru Kelu Nair =

Indian Dancer and Dance teacher

Guru Kelu Nair was a renowned Kathakali dance artist and teacher.

He trained in Kathakali from Kerala Kalamandalam under gurus like Pattikkantodi Ravunni Menon and Guru Kunchu Kurup. He pursued higher studies in Rasa-abhinaya from Rasa-abhinaya maestro guru Nātyāchārya Vidūshakaratnam Padma Shri Māni Mādhava Chākyār. In 1936, he was invited by Sri Rabindranath Tagore to establish the first Kathakali curriculum at Visva-Bharati University, Santiniketan. There were no Kathakali accompanists during the time, and he composed Kathakali dance in Rabindra Nritya. Only after Kathakali arrived in Santiniketan, Tagore wrote the dance drama Shyama in which the characters Bajrasen and Kotal were created with the Kathakali technique in mind. He remained as a faculty member in Santiniketan until the death of Tagore in 1941. Noteworthy disciples of Guru Kelu Nair include Mrinalini Sarabhai, Rukmini Devi Arundale and Yog Sunder Desai.

Guru Kelu Nair was awarded the Kerala Sangeetha Nataka Akademi Award in 1992 for his outstanding contribution to the field of Kathakali.

== See also ==
- Pattikkamthodi Ravunni Menon
