= Sailajaranjan Majumdar =

Indian Rabindra Sangeet singer (1900–1992)

- Born: 19 July 1900; Baham, Netrokona, British India
- Died: 24 May 1992 (aged 91); Salt Lake, Kolkata, West Bengal
- Occupations: Rabindra Sangeet exponent and teacher

Sailajaranjan Majumdar (19 July 1900 – 24 May 1992) was a distinguished exponent and teacher of Rabindra Sangeet.

== Early life ==
The son of Ramanikishore and Saralasundari Majumdar, Sailajaranjan was born at Baham, Netrokona, now in Bangladesh, on 19 July 1900. He passed matriculation from Dutta High School in Netrakona, in 1919, I Sc from Metropolitan College and B Sc from Scottish Church College. Although he had an aptitude for both vocal and instrumental music from childhood he followed his father's wishes. In 1924, he stood first in M Sc chemistry from the University of Calcutta and worked for a short period as a lecturer in Asutosh College. He then acquired a degree in law in 1927 and joined Netrokona bar library for some time. With the efforts of Prabhat Chandra Gupta, professor of economics, he joined Santiniketan in 1932. While working as a lecturer in chemistry, he had an opportunity of learning Rabindranath's songs from the poet himself as well as from Dinendranath Tagore.

== Later life ==
He observed Dinendranath preparing musical notations and got interested in the same. In 1935, when Dinendranath left Santiniketan, he started taking the music classes for youngsters as per instruction of the poet. He took lessons in classical music from Hemendralal Roy. In 1939, Rabindranath appointed him principal of Sangit Bhavana. He had prepared the notations for about 150 songs of the poet, most of his compositions in later life.

In 1960, he resigned from Visva Bharati University and permanently settled down in Kolkata. His primary interest in Kolkata was Surangama, a music institution. He was also associated with Gitabitan and Dakshini.

In 1985, Visva Bharati University honoured him with Desikottama.
