= Santidev Ghosh =

Indian author, singer, actor, dancer (1910–1999)

Santidev Ghose
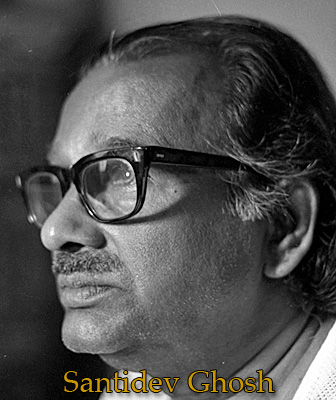
- Born: 7 May 1910; Bajapti, near Chandpur, Bengal Presidency, British India
- Died: 1 December 1999 (aged 89 years); Calcutta, West Bengal, India
- Other names: Santideb Ghosh; Shantidev Ghosh
- Occupations: author, singer, maestro

Santidev Ghose (also Santidev Ghosh, Shantidev Ghosh and Santideb Ghosh; 7 May 1910 – 1 December 1999) was an Indian author, singer, actor, dancer and maestro of Rabindra Sangeet.

Sagarmoy Ghosh, the renowned editor of Bengali literary journal Desh, was his younger brother.

As a teenager, Ghosh was selected by Rabindranath Tagore to be a teacher in Santiniketan and sent across India and even to Sri Lanka, Java and Bali to further his musical education for that purpose. Tagore also encouraged Ghosh to act and dance in the poet-laureate's dance dramas, for which Ghosh displayed an uncommon talent for singing, as well as dancing and acting. Some of the poems of Tagore which he converted to new forms of poem-songs, to be sung continuous without repeating the first two lines after each stanza, such as "Krishnakali", were first presented to the public by Ghosh. During his long and productive life in Santiniketan, Ghosh taught numerous students, many of whom were to later become famed notable singers themselves, such as Suchitra Mitra and Pramita Mallick. He also garnered fame as author and an authority, on Asian music and especially that of Rabindranath Tagore. During his life, he received notable awards and recognition from the music academies as well as Universities and the Government of India, and was declared a National Scholar by the Government of India. In 2002, India released a postage stamp on Ghosh to commemorate his contribution to music. The Minister for Communication and Information Technology noted that Ghosh "belonged to that class of musicians who through the ages carried forward music's unique creativity".

In 1976, he was awarded the Sangeet Natak Akademi Fellowship the highest honour conferred by Sangeet Natak Akademi, India's National Academy for Music, Dance and Drama.

== Biography ==
Santidev Ghosh was born on 24 Baisakh 1317 (7 May 1910) in the village of Bajapti near Chandpur. At that time, it was part of the British-controlled areas of India and of the province of East Bengal. Today, it is in Bangladesh.

His father was Kalimohan Ghosh, who worked with Rabindranath Tagore from before Santidev Ghosh was born, and was closely associated in the setting up the Rural Reconstruction Unit at Visva-Bharati. His mother was Monorama Devi. Originally, Tagore took Kalimohan to work on rural reconstruction programs in the Tagore estates in Silaidah, today's Bangladesh. Later, Kalimohan was brought by Rabindranath Tagore to Santiniketan, to work on similar scheme of rural reconstruction at Sriniketan, adjacent to Santiniketan. Kalimohan brought his six-month-old son, then named Santimoy (meaning peaceful) Ghosh, to Tagore. Tagore changed the middle part of his name, so his first name would be Santidev (meaning Lord of peace), which became Ghosh's common first name.

Santidev had his school education at the Santiniketan Ashrama Vidyalaya, which Tagore had founded in 1901. This is where he acquired proficiency in music, dance and acting under the direct guidance of the poet himself and Dinendranath. As Tagore's emissary, he visited Sri Lanka, Burma and Java and Bali, in today's Indonesia to learn music and dance of neighbouring countries.

Santidev joined Visva-Bharati University as a teacher in 1930, when he was 20 years old. He married Smt. Ila Ghosh in 1946. Later he became professor and head of the Department of Rabindra Music and Dance at Sangit Bhavana, the music department of Visva-Bharati University. He also served as the principal of the institute between 1964 and 1968 and between 1971 and 1973.

Santidev was appointed a member of the Advisory Board of Akasvani (All India Radio), Calcutta in 1948 and served as a member of the publication committee of the Sangeet-Natak Akademi, New Delhi (1956–60). He was the president of the music section of Prabasi Bango Sahitya Sammelan (Expatriate Bengali Cultural Organization) and Assam Sahitya Sammelan (1964). The prolific singer widely travelled in India and abroad. He visited the United Kingdom, Japan, Bangladesh, Sri Lanka and the former USSR to acquaint himself with the culture and traditions of those countries and also to propagate the ideals of Rabindranath.

== Awards and recognition ==
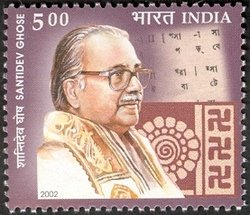
Santidev Ghose Indian Postage stamp, 2002

- Fellow of Sangeet Natak Akademi in 1977 – Indian National Academi of Music, Dance and Drama, New Delhi
- Sureshchandra Memorial Ananda Award in 1980 – An award by the Ananda Publishers Group for outstanding contribution to culture
- Padmabhusan by the Central Government of India in 1984 – Third highest national award for a civilian.
- Deshikottama, the highest award bestowed by the Visva-Bharati University in 1984, similar to an Honorary D.Litt.
- Honorary D.Litt. from Burdwan University
- Honorary D.Litt. Rabindra Bharati Universities in 1991
- Rabindra Tattvacharya at the Tagore Research Institute, Kolkata

== Publications ==
- Rabindra Sangeet (Tagore Music)
- Java O Balir Nrityageet (Music and Dance of Java and Bali)
- Rupakar Nandalal (Artist Nandalal)
- Bharatiya Gramin Sanskriti (Folk Culture of India)
- Rabindranather Sikshadarshe Sangit O Nritya (Music and Dance in the Rabindranath's Educational Philosophy)
- Gurudev Rabindranath O Adhunik Bharatiya Nritya (Rabindranath Tagore and Dances of Modern India)
- Rabindra Sangit-Vichitra (Rabindranath Tagore Music Miscellany)
- Nrityakala O Rabindranath (The Art of Dance in the Eyes of Rabindranath Tagore)
- Jiboner Dhrubata (The Polestar of Life), his autobiography.
- Shantidev (a full-length documentary film by Shameek Siddartha produced by government of West Bengal)

== Sources ==
- Great Masters section on Visva Bharati University official site
- A tribute to Santidev Ghosh
- Sagarmoy Gosh: The Legend of a Man
