= Edith Loring Getchell =

American artist

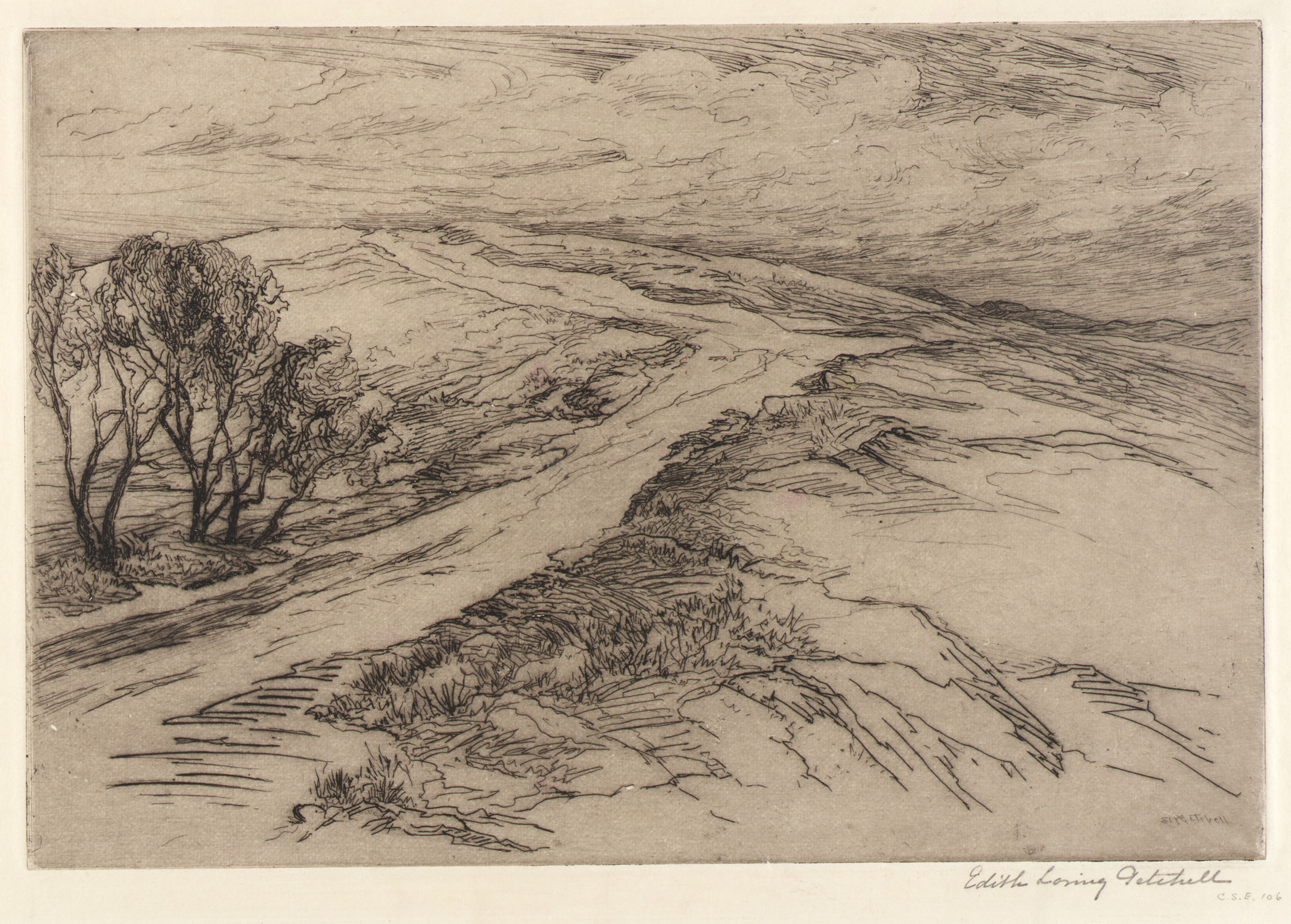
- "A Windswept Road," n.d., etching on paper, Smithsonian American Art Museum, Gift of Chicago Society of Etchers, 1935
- Born: Edith "Ella" Loring Peirce (Getchell after 1885); January 25, 1855; Bristol, Pennsylvania, US
- Died: September 18, 1940 (aged 85); Worcester, Massachusetts, US
- Education: Philadelphia School of Design for Women, Philadelphia Academy of Fine Arts
- Known for: Landscape etchings
- Spouse: Dr. Alfred Colby Getchell
- Children: Ruth Peirce Getchell and Margaret Colby Getchell Parsons

Edith Loring Getchell (1855 – 1940) was an American landscape painter and etcher, highly regarded for the "exquisite" tonalism of her etchings, drypoints and watercolors." Working during the "American Etching Revival," a period that lent legitimacy to an art form that had once been scorned as commercial, Getchell made use of the opportunities the vogue for etching gave her, despite a crowded field and the gender discrimination of her era. Considered one of America's leading etchers in her lifetime, Getchell's work is notable for its skill, its aesthetic values and its approach to depicting American landscape.

== Career ==
Getchell was one of only two women included in a book on America's 25 leading American etchers in 1886. The following year she was invited to exhibit in "'Women Etchers of America,' the earliest comprehensive exposure of the work of women artists by an American institution" — and an historic first. That year, she was also accepted into the nearly all-male New York Etching Club, which her teacher Robert Swain Gifford had helped found. "One of the preeminent groups for the nineteenth-century etching revival," it helped her create key connections for building a viable career.

Over the next several years, Getchell's work was frequently reproduced in print, widely acquired by American art museums and exhibited in London, Paris and across the United States. In 1908, the Worcester Art Museum curated a two-week solo exhibition of her etchings.

Atlanta's High Museum of Art organized an exhibition revisiting the "American Women of the Etching Revival" in 1988. Curator Phyllis Peet cited a 1902 review to describe her:

[T]he work of Edith Loring Getchell is vigorous, original and effective without affectation. . . . Her hand is particularly sympathetic to all that is beautiful in foliation and growth of trees, atmospheric or climatic conditions of light, and those subtleties of nature best adapted to expression with the point. ’ — Will Jenkins, Modern Etching and Engraving in America.

== Education ==
Getchell studied painting, printmaking and textile design at the Philadelphia School of Design for Women, one of the "art schools [that] conferred professional status in a cultural field once dominated by men... to counter the accusation of amateurism. One of her teachers there was tonalist William Sartain. Another was Peter Moran, best known for his etchings of animal subjects, and for brothers Thomas and Edward who were also professional artists.

At the Philadelphia Academy of Fine Arts (PAFA), Getchell studied with landscape painter Robert Swain Gifford who was influenced by the more realist, and less romantic, approach to painting of the Barbizon school. At PAFA, she also studied with realist Thomas Eakins, who would later paint a well-received portrait of Getchell's husband As a private student, Getchell also studied with landscape painter and etcher Stephen Parrish, with whom she later exhibited alongside artist Mary Cassatt.

== Memberships ==
- California Society of Etchers
- Chicago Society of Etchers
- New York Etching Club
- Philadelphia Sketch Club
- Philadelphia Society of Artists

== Collections ==
- Library of Congress
- New York Public Library
- Boston Museum of Fine Arts
- Five Colleges of Ohio
- National Gallery of Art, Washington
- Princeton University Art Museum
- Smithsonian American Art Museum
- University of Arizona Museum of Art
- Wentworth Military Academy Museum
- Worcester Art Museum
- University Art Collection, Georgetown
- The Walters Art Museum, Baltimore
- Wellin Museum of Art, Hamilton College
- Museum of Art, University of New Hampshire

== Publications ==
- American etchings: A collection of twenty original etchings by Moran, Parrish, Ferris, Smillie, and others; with descriptive text and biographical matter. Boston: Estes and Lauriat: January 1, 1885 ASIN : B00086AUHE
- Gems of American Etchers. New York: Cassell, c1885. (Sirsi) ACO-0770 62653
- Union League Club, Exhibition Catalogue of the Work of Women Etchers of America. New York: Frederick Keppel & Company
- Philadelphia Art Union. New York: Frederick Keppel & Company.

== Commissions ==
- Philadelphia: Robert M. Lindsay
- San Francisco: W.K. Vickery
- Union League Club: Cover of the "Women Etchers of America" exhibition catalogue

== Gallery ==
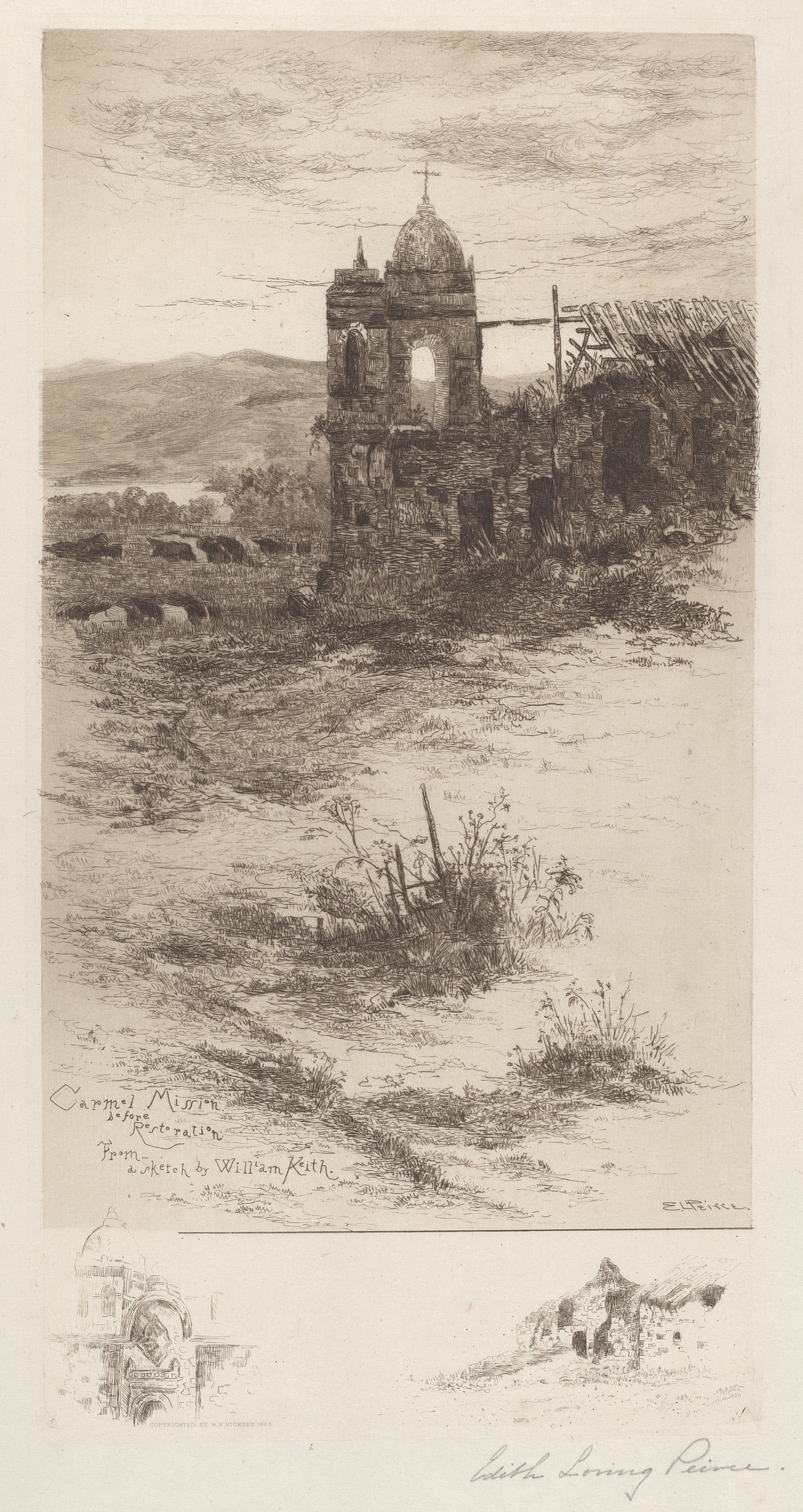
"Carmel Mission Before Restoration,' after William Keith, etching, 1885–86.

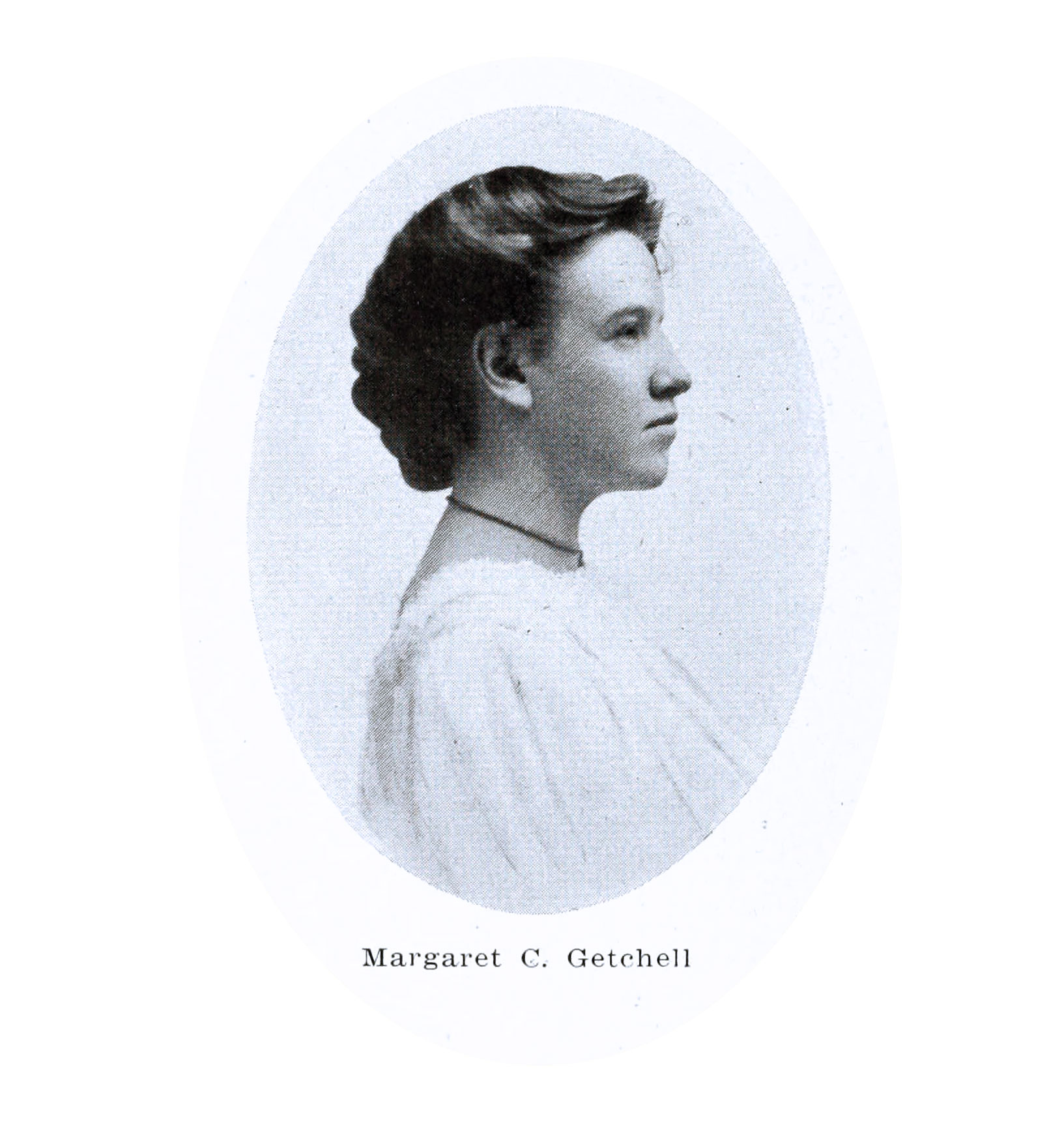
A 1908 portrait of daughter Margaret Colby Getchell Parsons as a teenager.

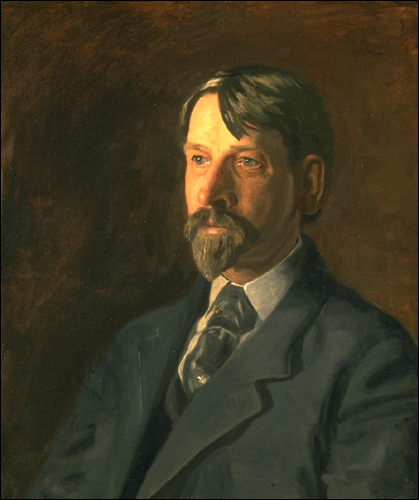
A 1907 portrait of husband Albert C. Getchell by Thomas Eakins.

Worcester Art Museum, 1908 solo exhibition list of included works.

== See also ==
- Etching
- Etching revival
