= Mukul Dey =

Indian artist (1895-1989)

Mukul Chandra Dey
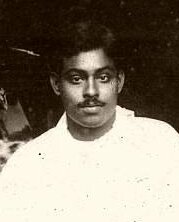
- Born: Mukul Chandra Dey; 23 July 1895; Sridharkhola, Bengal Presidency, British India
- Died: 1 March 1989 (aged 93); Santiniketan, West Bengal, India
- Known for: Etching
- Spouse(s): Bina, née Roy

Mukul Chandra Dey (23 July 1895 – 1 March 1989) was one of five children of Purnashashi Devi and Kula Chandra Dey. He was a student of Rabindranath Tagore's Santiniketan and is considered as a pioneer of drypoint-etching in India. The entire family of Mukul Dey had artistic talents, the brother Manishi Dey was a well-known painter, and his two sisters, Annapura and Rani Chanda, were accomplished in arts and crafts as well.

Mukul Dey was married to Bina Roy, who was from Khanakul, Bengal. They had one daughter named Manjari, whom they affectionately called Bukuma. Manjari was later married to Shantanu Ukil, a leading painter of the Bengal School of Art.

== Early years ==
He was the first Indian artist to travel abroad for the purpose of studying printmaking as an art. While in Japan in 1916, Mukul Dey studied under Yokoyama Taikan and Kanzan Shimomura at Tokyo and Yokohama. At Yokohama Rabindranath Tagore and Mukul Dey lived as guests of Japanese silk-merchant Tomitaro Hara at his famous residential complex Sankeien, enjoying a rare opportunity to study classical Chinese and Nihonga style Japanese paintings. Especially the masterpieces of Sesshu Toyo.

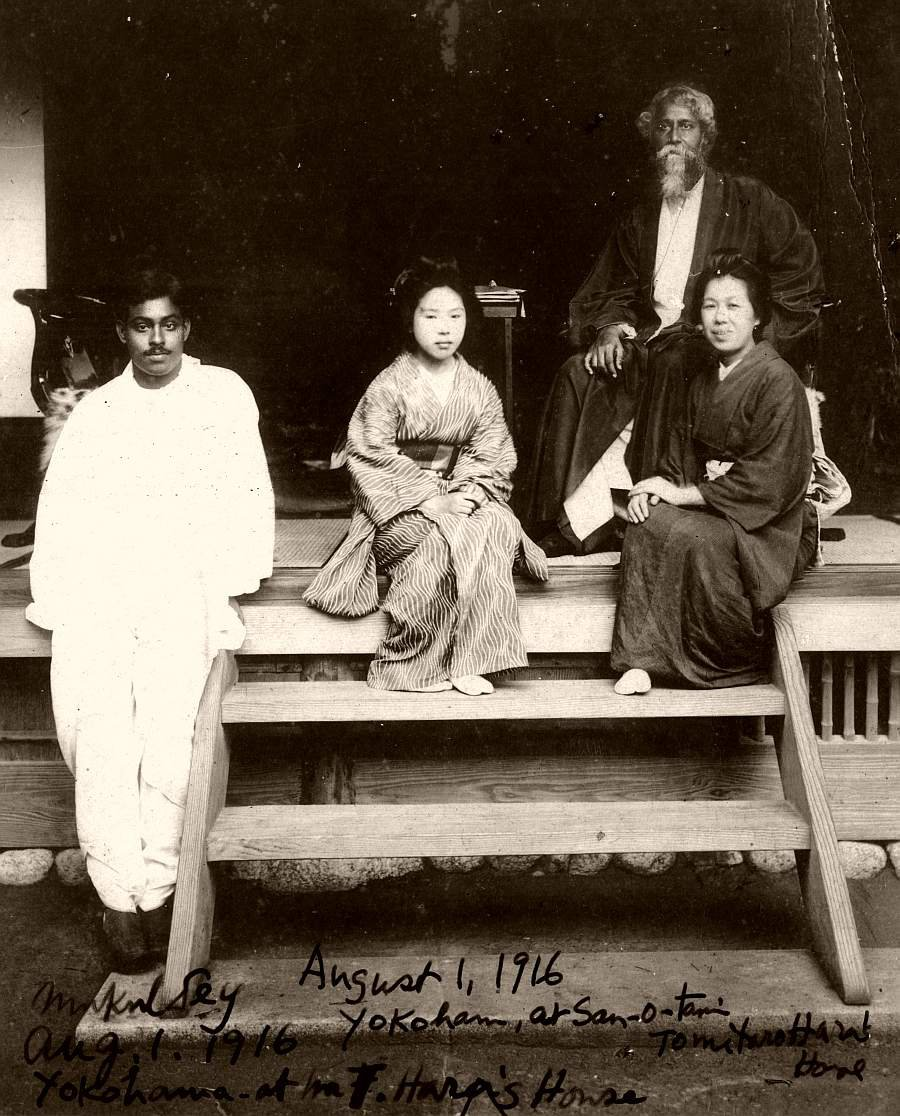
Dey (far left) with Rabindranath Tagore, "Kiyo-san" and another Japanese lady at Tomitaro Hara's residence Sankei-en in Yokohama, Japan; on 1 August 1916.

Dey received his initial training at Rabindranath Tagore's Santiniketan. He then travelled to America from Japan in 1916 to learn the technique of etching under James Blanding Sloan and Bertha Jaques in Chicago, to whom Dey was introduced by American artist Roi Partridge and his wife Imogen Cunningham. Mukul Dey remained a life-member of Chicago Society of Etchers. On his return to India in 1917, Dey concentrated on creating etchings as a fine art. He also supported himself through making portrait drawings of the rich and famous, and turned these into etchings. In 1920 Dey once again travelled abroad for the purpose of study, this time learning etching and engraving under Frank Short and Muirhead Bone. He studied at both the Slade School of Fine Art and the Royal College of Art in London. At Slade School of Art Mukul Dey was a student of Professor Henry Tonks.

An exhibition of Dey's drawings and paintings were shown, including ten copies of paintings at Ajanta and 1 at the Bagh Caves, courtesy of Lady Grant, at 59 Onslow Square, London, on 4 February 1924. His work had already been shown at the Royal Academy and the New English Art Club.

Abanindranath Tagore teaching art to Mukul Chandra Dey.

According to the Polish sculptor Stanislaw Szukalski, when Mukul was in America, he showed Szukalski his drawings, which impressed the artist. He then told Szukalski of his desire to venture into Paris, to "finish his study", despite the extreme disapproval of this decision by Mukul's mentor, Tagore. Szukalski thought of Paris as a factory for the "brainwashing of the public of every nation", into thinking Kandinsky, Picasso, etc., were masters. Szukalski told Mukul, "You are already a fine artist, but with your silly anticipation of finding miraculous Culture in Europe, you will swallow as a new religion any pseudo-movement, any Ism of the misfits who abuse painting and sculpture with combs, forks and brushes stuck in their noses to give an easy semblance of individuality. Later come to Europe, with enough belief in yourself to look upon European Decadence with CONTEMPT and the ability to select really worthy examples of Art from all ages and Cultures". This argument persuaded Mukul to return to Santiniketan, to the delight of Tagore.

Mukul Dey chose an essentially Western medium to portray various sides of Indian life. Unlike artists such as Haren Das, whose woodcut printing technique was more indigenous to Indian culture, Dey concentrated on drypoint etching, a thoroughly European practice. Regardless of his adopted Western technique, Dey chose subjects such as river scenes in Bengal, traditional baul singers, the markets of Calcutta, or the life of Santhal villagers in the Birbhum district, near the Santiniketan art school. When the Tagore family of Kolkata created the Vichitra Club at their ancestral home of Jorasanko, Mukul Dey became an active member. At Vichitra Club, the young and upcoming artists like Nandalal Bose, Asit Kumar Haldar, Mukul Dey and Narayan Kashinath Deval were encouraged to experiment in ever new creative mediums and art forms.

In 1925, Dey published a book on the cave paintings in Ajanta and Bagh, which he cherished and used as an inspiration. The vibrant language of the descriptions reflects his enthusiasm for the cave paintings. He later published and illustrated various other books during his career.

== Professional career ==
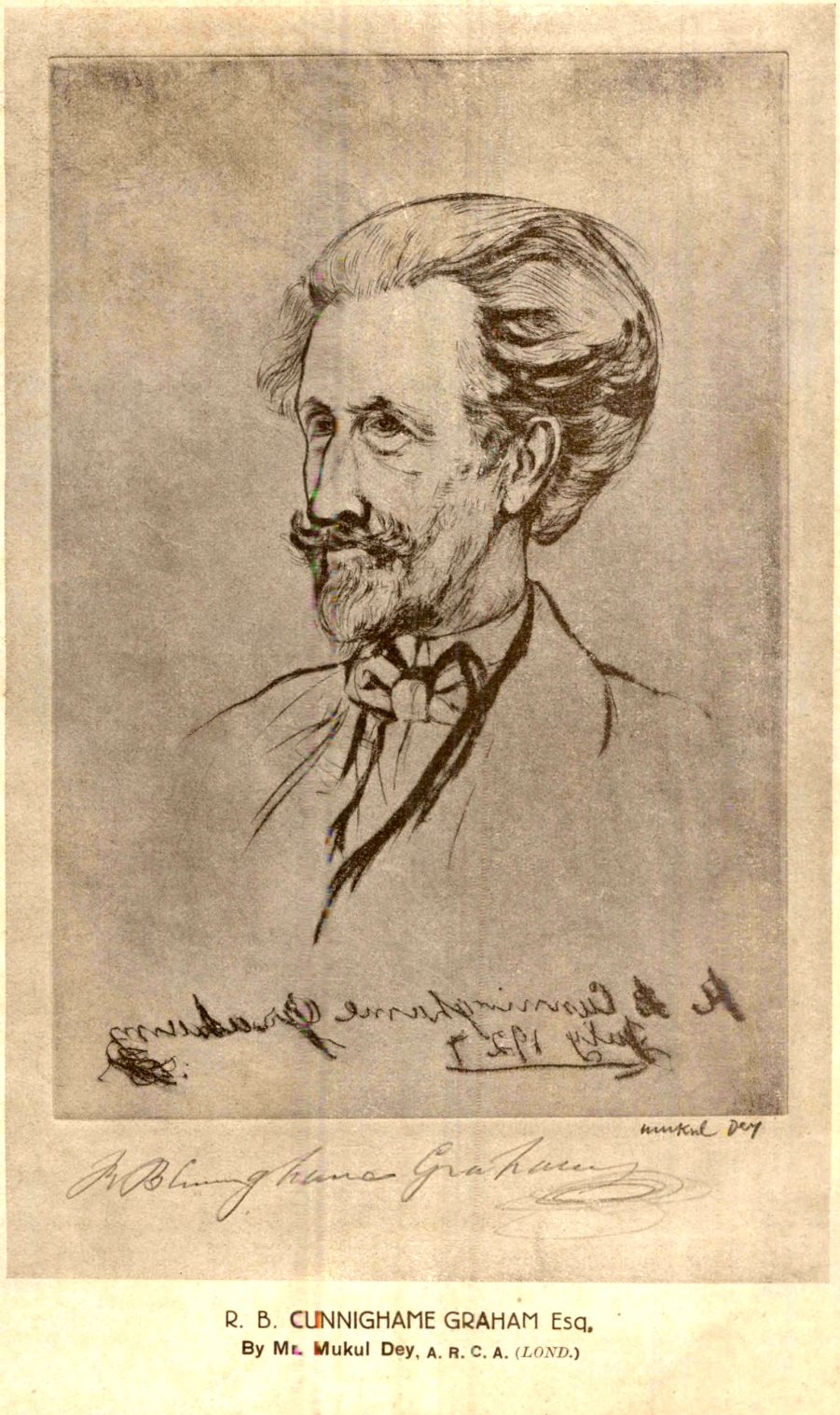
Cunninghame Graham by Mukul Dey.

Dey was appointed the first Indian Principal of the Government School of Art, Calcutta, in 1928. Since Dey was committed to imposing an Indian identity on the then British-controlled art establishment, he quickly drove teachers too closely linked with Company School painting out of the institution. While at Government School of Art, Calcutta Mukul Dey was responsible for starting a women's section there. Prior to his time only men could join this institution as art students.

Gracefully drawn images of Bengali villagers executed in dry-point have become what Dey is most associated with. Some of his finer works are dry-point etchings that have been hand-coloured with watercolors, coloured pencils, or thin washes of ink. Dey is also remembered for his portraits of various Indian personalities, including members of the Tagore and Tata families, Albert Einstein, and Mohandas Karamchand Gandhi. He also depicted lesser known personalities, such as Josephine MacLeod, the promoter of Swami Vivekananda's Ramakrishna order at Belur Math. Incidentally, it was Josephine MacLeod who first brought Okakura Kakuzo to India from Japan in 1901–1902.

Manishi Dey, the younger brother of Mukul, was a member of the Progressive Artists' Group and a prominent painter of the Bengal School of Art. In contrast to his more steady brother Mukul, Manishi travelled tirelessly throughout India. Earlier in 1916, Dey became the first Indian to be elected a member of the Chicago Society of Etchers. Later in his career, he served as the curator of the National Gallery of Modern Art, New Delhi, from 1956 to 1958.

== Legacy ==
Mukul Dey's works are found in the collections of the Victoria and Albert Museum, London, the Indian Museum, Kolkata, the National Gallery of Modern Art NGMA in Mumbai, and the National Gallery of Art, New Delhi. The Mukul Dey Archives are housed at Mukul Dey's former home, named Chitralekha, at Santiniketan. He was also the illustrator for many book projects, one of his earliest was a scholarly book Shantiniketan Bolpur School of Rabindranath Tagore, which he illustrated for the later Nobel Prize winner in 1916. In 1987, he was elected a fellow of the Lalit Kala Akademi, New Delhi.

== Bibliography ==
- Pearson, WW. with illustrations by Mukul Chandra Dey. Shantiniketan: The Bolpur School of Rabindranath Tagore. The Macmillan Company, 1916.
- Mukul Chandra Dey. My Pilgrimages To Ajanta Bagh. Published in English by George H. Doran Co, New York, USA, 1925.
- Mukul Chandra Dey. Twenty Portraits. 1943
- Mukul Chandra Dey. Birbhum Terracottas. 1959
- Mukul Chandra Dey. Amar Kotha, ed. Visva Bharati, 1995 A posthumously published autobiography.
