= Walter Satterlee =

19th/20th-century American painter

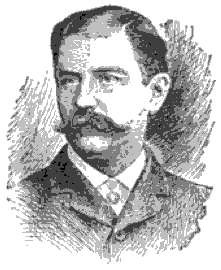
- Born: January 18, 1844; Brooklyn, New York
- Died: May 28, 1908 (aged 64); Brooklyn, New York
- Education: Columbia University
- Occupation: Painter

Walter Satterlee (January 18, 1844 – May 28, 1908) was an American figure and genre painter.

== Biography ==
He was born in Brooklyn, New York. He graduated from Columbia University in 1863, studied in the National Academy of Design, and with Edwin White, in New York, and in 1878–1879 under Leon Bonnat in Paris. He first exhibited at the National Academy in 1868, was elected an associate of the academy in 1879, and received its Thomas B. Clarke prize in 1886. He was a member of the American Water Color Society and of the New York Etching Club, and was an excellent teacher. Satterlee died in Brooklyn in 1908.

In 1875, Satterlee completed a painting of James William Beekman Sr. In 1906, Gerard Beekman and James William Beekman donated the painting to the New-York Historical Society.

In 1885, the New York Etching Club published a portfolio: New York Etching Club Exhibition featuring nine artists including a work by Satterlee titled: A Fresh Breeze from the Sea.

Among his favorite subjects were Arab life and figures in the costume of the colonial period.
