= Nelly McKenzie Tolman =

American painter

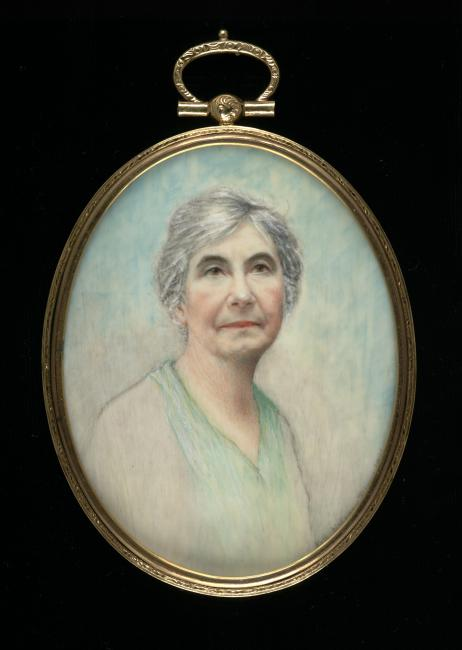
Portrait of Bertha Jacques, 1936, in the collection of the Smithsonian American Art Museum

Nelly Summeril McKenzie Tolman (1877–1961) was an American painter.

Born in Salisbury, North Carolina, Nelly McKenzie traveled to Washington, D.C. to study at the Corcoran School of Art. Among her instructors there was Ruel Pardee Tolman, whom she would go on to marry. A specialist in miniature painting, she began working in the discipline around 1926, and remained active for many years in local artistic circles. She belonged to the Miniature Painters, Gravers and Sculptors Society of Washington, the Washington Water Color Club, and the Arts Club of Washington, and exhibited regularly with each; she also showed work at the Corcoran Gallery of Art and the Pennsylvania Academy of the Fine Arts and with the American Artists Professional League. She was among those artists included in the Greater Washington Independent Exhibition of 1935. Tolman died in Washington.

A portrait by Tolman, of artist Bertha Jaques, is currently owned by the Smithsonian American Art Museum. A portrait of Elizabeth C. Wickersham is in the collection of the Philadelphia Museum of Art.
