= List of American print clubs =

This is a list of American artist printmaking societies and print clubs in chronological order of their founding. Note: The purpose of this timeline is to focus on the organization of artist printmakers into societies, and not to focus on clubs of collectors. The distinction between "society" and "club" is not necessarily reflected in the name of the organization nor in the inclusion of an organization in this list.

| Year | Printmaking society | Address | Notes |
|---|---|---|---|
| 1839 | Apollo Association for the Promotion of the Fine Arts | New York City, New York | |
| 1877 | New York Etchers Club | New York City, New York | |
| 1880s | Boston Etching Club | Boston, Massachusetts | |
| 1880s–1915 | Philadelphia Society of Etchers | Philadelphia, Pennsylvania | |
| 1880s | Cincinnati Etchers Club | Cincinnati, Ohio | |
| 1880s | Brooklyn Scratchers Club | Brooklyn, New York City, New York | |
| 1881 | Society of Painter-Etchers | New York City, New York | |
| 1886 | French Etching Club | New York City, New York | |
| 1888 | Society of American Etchers | | |
| 1909 | Needle Club, Chicago | | |
| 1910–1956 | Needle Club | | incorporated as Chicago Society of Etchers |
| 1912 | California Society of Etchers | San Francisco, California | |
| 1913 | New York Society of Etchers | | |
| 1913 | California Society of Etchers/Printmakers' first and second annual exhibitions | San Francisco, California | |
| 1914 | Printmakers of Los Angeles | Los Angeles, California | |
| 1915 | Print Club of Philadelphia | Philadelphia, Pennsylvania | |
| 1916 | New York Society of Etchers | Brooklyn, New York City, New York | becomes Brooklyn Society of Etchers. |
| 1917 | Painter-Gravers of America | | |
| 1919 | Print Club of Cleveland | Cleveland, Ohio | |
| 1921 | Printmakers of Los Angeles | Los Angeles, California | becomes Printmakers Society of California |
| 1924 | Cincinnati Print and Drawing Club | | |
| 1928 | Honolulu Printmakers | Honolulu, Ohau, Hawaii | |
| 1928 | Northwest Printmakers Society | | |
| 1930 | American Society of Print Collectors, Ohio State University | | |
| 1930 | Print Club of Rochester | Rochester, New York | |
| 1931 | Buffalo Print Club | | |
| 1931 | Prairie Print Makers | Wichita, Kansas | |
| 1931 | Brooklyn Society of Etchers | Brooklyn, New York City, New York | becomes Society of American Etchers |
| 1931 | Haden Etching Club | | |
| 1932 | Syracuse Print Club | | |
| 1932 | Woodcut Society | | |
| 1933 | Society of Washington DC Etchers | Washington, D. C. | |
| 1933 | Print Club of Albany | | |
| 1934 | Indiana Society of Print Makers | | |
| 1934 | Washington Etchers | | |
| 1935 | Southern Printmakers Society | Mount Airy, Georgia | |
| 1935 | Dallas Print Club | Dallas, Texas | |
| 1937 | Lone Star Printmakers | | |
| 1940 | Princeton Print Club | | |
| 1940–41 | Friends of Contemporary Prints | | |
| c.1945 | Iowa Print Group | | |
| 1947 | Boston Printmakers | Boston, Massachusetts | |
| 1952 | Society of American Etchers | | becomes Society of American Graphic Artists (SAGA) |
| 1955 | Bay Printmakers | | merge to form California Society of Printmakers |
| 1962 | Los Angeles Printmakers Society | Los Angeles, California | |
| 1968 | California Society of Etchers and Bay Printmakers | | merge to form California Society of Printmakers |
| 1972 | Southern Graphics Council | University of South Carolina, Columbia, South Carolina | |
| 1991 | The Print Club of New York, NYC | New York City, New York | PCNY website |
| 1992 | American Print Alliance | | |
| 1992 | Mid America Print Council | | MAPC website |
