= Rani Chanda =

Indian artist and writer (1912–1997)

- Born: Rani Dey; July 1912; Medinipur, British India
- Died: 19 June 1997 (aged 84); Santiniketan, West Bengal, India
- Occupations: Writer, artist

Rani Chanda (née Dey) (1912 – 19 June 1997) was an Indian artist and writer.

== Early life ==
Rani Chanda was one of five children of Purnashashi Devi and Kula Chandra Dey. Her father was a dear friend of Rabindranath Tagore. She was trained in music, dance and arts at Visva Bharati and was a regular member of Rabindranath's dance drama recitals. Mukul Chandra Dey, a pioneer of drypoint-etching in India, was her elder brother.

== Works and later life ==
Rabindranath Tagore first advised Rani Chanda to write. Unable to decide on the topic, she showed the poet the notes she took when Abanindranath Tagore used to tell stories of Rabindranath. The poet liked them and encouraged her to visit Abanindranath again and collect more such stories. These were later published as Ghorowa on Abanindranath's 70th birthday.

In his last days, when Rabindranath Tagore was unwell, and could not even write, Rani Chanda used to write the letters hearing the poet and he used to sign them. She also used to note down poems and essays which the poet used to dictate during this time.

Rani Chanda was jailed for her involvement in Indian freedom movement in 1942. She wrote the book Jenana Fatok describing her days in the jail. In her travelogue Pothe Ghate she wrote about her experiences of going to official tours with her husband.

== Personal life ==
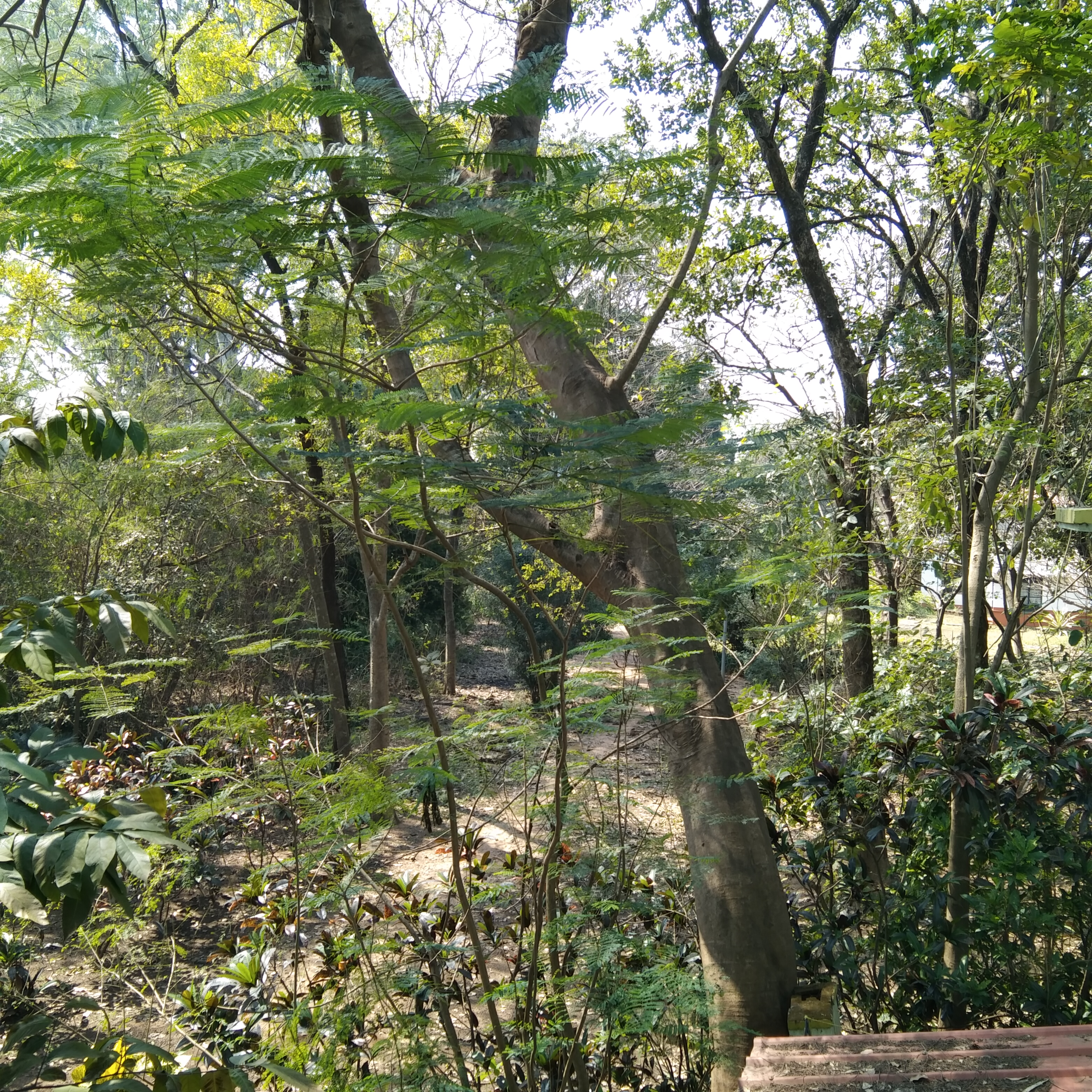
Garden of the Jeet-Bhum at Shyambati.

Rani Chanda married Rabindranath Tagore's private secretary Anil Kumar Chanda. It was a love marriage and it was supervised by the poet himself. The ceremony took place at Tata Palace, Bombay in 1934 attended by luminaries like Sarojini Naidu, R. Rajagopalachari and S. Radhakrishnan. After Tagore's death she, along with her husband, went to Delhi and spent 20 years of her life there. In 1955, as a member of the cultural team, she visited East Europe and the then Soviet Union along with her husband. She returned to Shantiniketan in 1972 and stayed at her house Jeetbhum in Shyambati until her death.

== Awards ==
Rani Chanda received the Rabindra Purashkar for her travelogue Purnokumbho in 1954. She was honoured with Bhuvan Mohini Gold Medal by Calcutta University and received honorary D.Lit. from Rabindra Bharati University for her literature.
