= Margaret Colby Getchell Parsons =

American writer

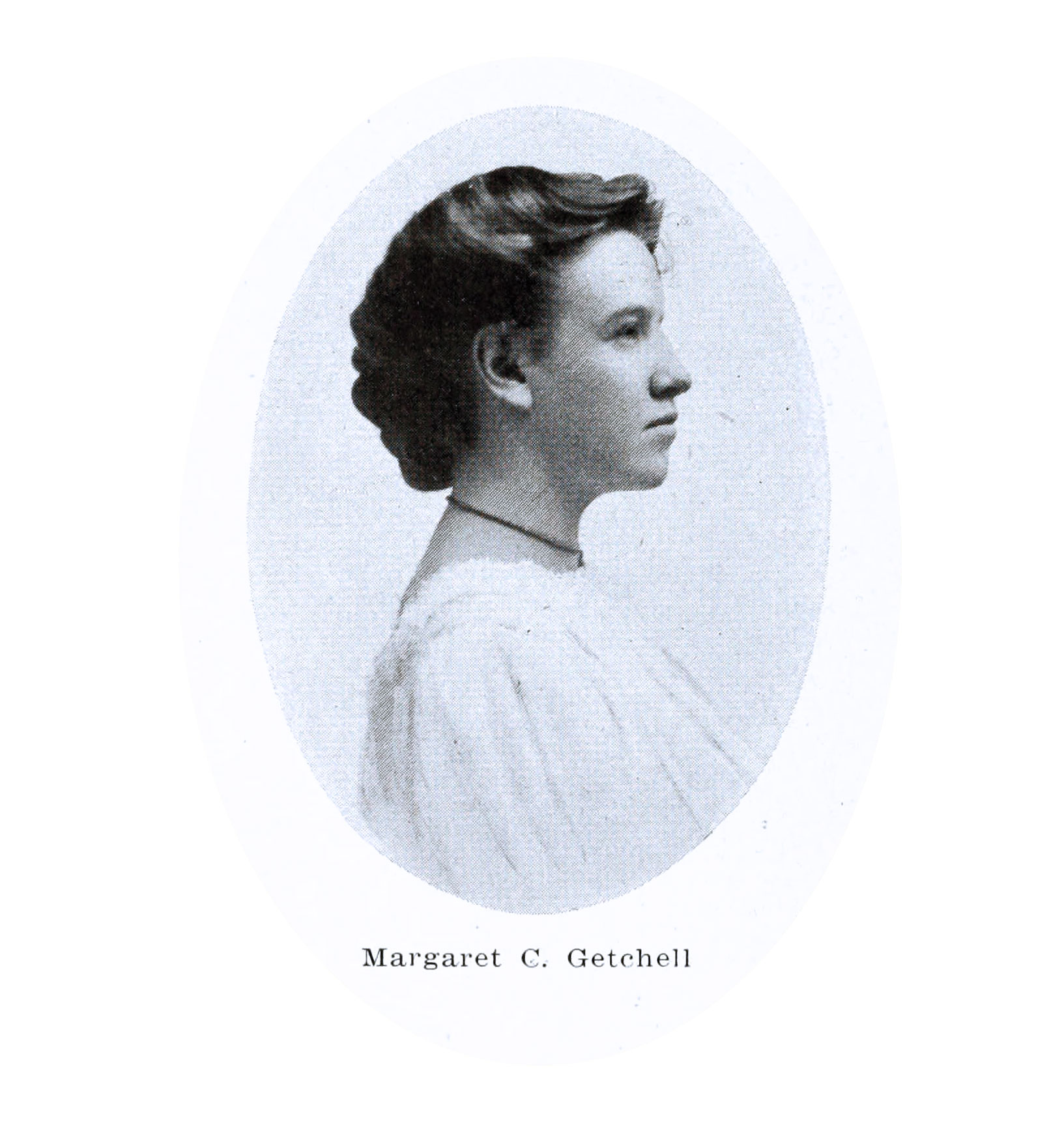
- The author at aged 16 or 17 in 1908.
- Born: August 25, 1891; Worcester, Massachusetts, US
- Died: January 13, 1970 (aged 78); Southborough, Massachusetts, US
- Education: Wheaton College (Massachusetts), Radcliffe College
- Occupation: Author
- Spouse: Eugene Olian Parsons
- Relatives: Daughter of artist Edith Loring Getchell
- Writing career
- Pen name: Professional use of some combination of first, middle and surnames.
- Genres: Journalist, critic, children's book writer and children's playwright

Margaret Colby Getchell Parsons (1891–1970) was an American journalist in the 1920s. Although a features writer, rather than an investigative reporter, she matched her investigative peers in originality and, like them, also wrote on under-reported "women's issues." In long-form articles like "What is Least on which a Working Woman Can Live?" she focused on practical issues, such as women's poverty-level wages. But there were also numerous profiles of brave female role models, including Clara Barton, Joan of Arc and Marie, Romania's last queen, who "fled the fairy tale" to minister to wounded soldiers during World War I.

In a prolific career, Getchell also wrote for children, and her books, plays and "playlets" stand out for their emphasis on the independence and imagination of her audience, and her dismay that more dramatists weren't adapting plays with children in mind. She argued that children were "natural playwrights," and that making them think would reduce the need for family discipline.

In 1929, Getchell, by then known as Parsons, became a full-time writer and book critic for the Worcester-based Sunday Telegram and Evening Gazette where she remained until 1960.

== Girl Reporter ==
For the first decade or so of Getchell's career, starting around 1916 when she was hired onto the editorial staff of the Worcester Gazette (now known as the Telegram & Gazette), she began freelancing for other newspapers, first within Massachusetts, then republishing local stories on topics like housing and the local park in other parts of the country. By the late teens, she was publishing in newspapers nationwide, and her sometimes eccentric range ran the gamut: from film scores to, more adventurously, the burgeoning aviation industry and arctic exploration. But she also wrote on lighter topics, profiling a barber to the stars in a piece called "Famous Men I Have Shaved," as well as under-reported stories like "Pilots of Industry at Ninety Guide Giant Business." Her takes were frequently inventive, and sometimes also quite compassionate, as evidenced by pieces like "Lip-Reading Folk Get Small Enjoyment from Movies."

Writing on Women

A profile of Marie of Romania, a contemporary queen who "fled the fairy tale."

A full-page analysis of poverty-level wages for women that fell far below the 1919 minimum.

== Children's Books and Plays ==
Early into her career, Getchell was already balancing her journalism for adults with books, stories and plays for children. In Writer: A Monthly Magazine for Literary Workers, she describes already having completed, and sold, a set of plays that could be performed at home as entertainment at holiday parties, with sets and costumes so simple they allowed for improvisation only a year or so out of college. Around that time, she also published three children's books, each in a different genre: The Cloud Bird, a fairy tale adventure, illustrated by Edith Bollinger Price, and featuring a swan, a bear, a fish and other creatures, who appear, willy-nilly, in miniature, on any part of the page in "their" chapter with Dorothy Ann, the little girl heroine whose greatest adventures were at night. Her second book Proposal Number Seven features two comedic acts, and a makeshift diagram showing children how to organize their own sets. The third was more commercial in intent, akin to Getchell's holiday and rainy day plays still to come, only Spruce Cone and Bunchberry, as it says in subtitle, is A Campfire Girls Play, with enough parts for a dozen girls, plus casting tips.

== Book reviews ==
Getchell went on to write several other children's books, and she became the full-time book editor at the Worcester Telegram & Gazette in 1929. She maintained her post at the paper until 1960 when she retired. She died in 1970.

Ivan Sandrof, her successor, memorialized her by writing:

With Maggie Parsons went, possibly, the last of the rugged individualists ... she was old Worcester, a concentrated version, rare as an uncooked beefsteak, quick to speak her mind, highhearted, loud of voice, opinionated, fearless; once heard, never forgotten.

== Personal life ==
Getchell and her sister Ruth came from a sophisticated background. Their father Dr. Albert Colby, was a "prominent specialist in throat and lung diseases, and a pioneering treatment of tuberculosis." Their mother Edith Loring Getchell (née Pierce) was a former student of Thomas Eakins, and a prominent artist with an international career whose work has been collected by the Smithsonian American Art Museum, the National Gallery of Art in Washington, D.C. and other major institutions.

One of only two to earn a B.A. from Wheaton College in 1914, the first year they were offering degrees, Getchell later attended Radcliffe. In 1921, she married Eugene Olian Parsons, garden editor for the Sunday Telegram and Evening Gazette. Their only child was Carol E. Parsons Rader (1932–2019).

== Bibliography ==
- Spruce, Cone and Bunchberry. A play about an unpleasant family which becomes pleasant when the Camp Fire spirit enters the home. (1916)
- The Cloud Bird (1916)
- Proposal Number Seven: A comedy in two acts (1918)
- Colette of the Red Cross: A play in two scenes for Red Cross juniors. (1919)
- Jack-i'-the-green and the Petentate of Weaterdom (1920) (as Margaret Colby Getchell.)
- Red Letter Day Plays (1921)
- In the Children's Play-house (1923)
- Ten stirring Bible plays (1927)
- Good Turns, or Only a Tenderfoot: A boy scout play in three acts (1928)
- Scoops: A comedy in three acts for female characters (1930)
- Almost Rehearsal-less Plays; Stunts and Novelty Programs (1931)
- The Woman's Club Playbook (1935)
- Off the Old Block: A one act-comedy for all women (1935)
- A modern Thanksgiving, a play in one act (1937)
- One Night Stand: five one-act plays for young people (1942)

== Collections ==
- Hathitrust Digital Library
- Library of Congress: For the full text of the Cloud Bird.

== Gallery ==
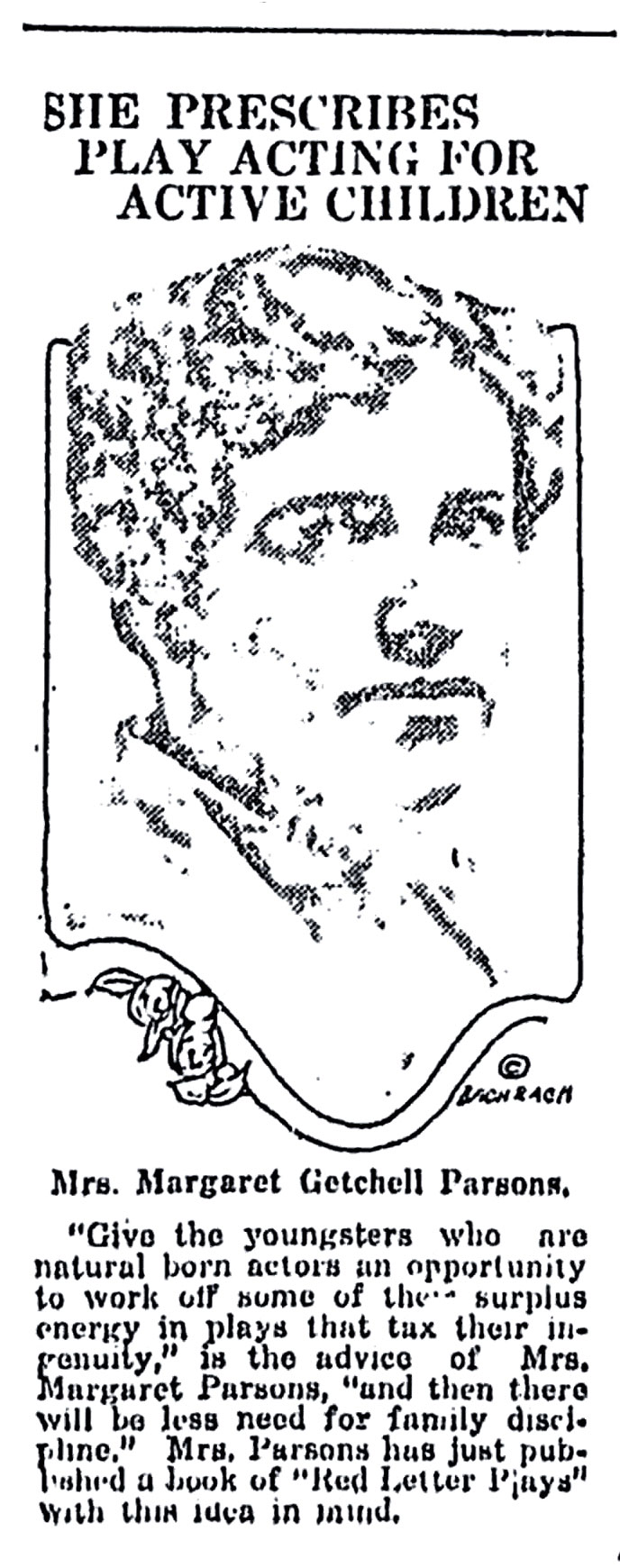
A 1922 woodcut accompanying a quote in Pennsylvania's Daily Times.

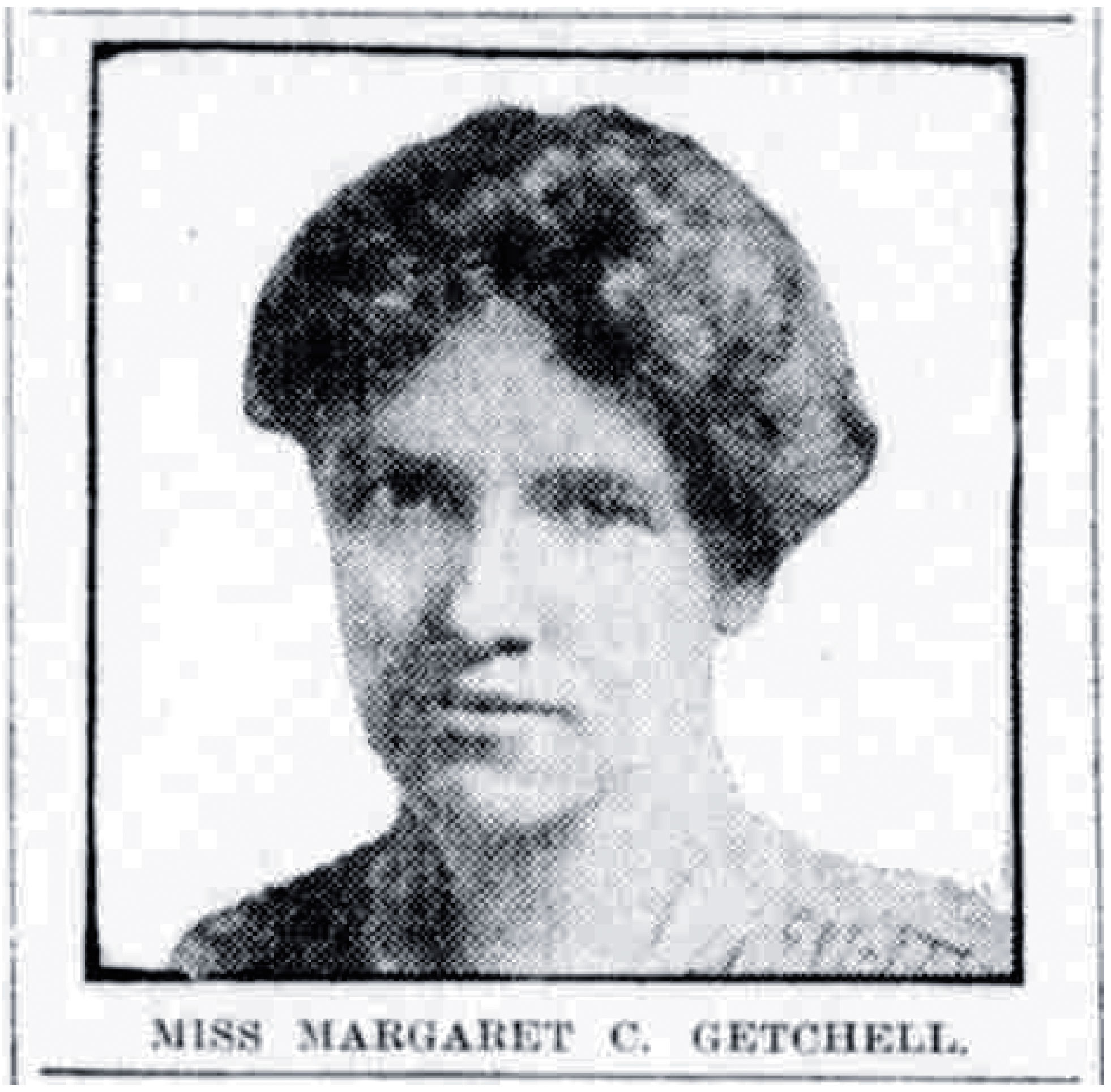
A 1917 photo accompanying an interview about children's plays in the Boston Globe.

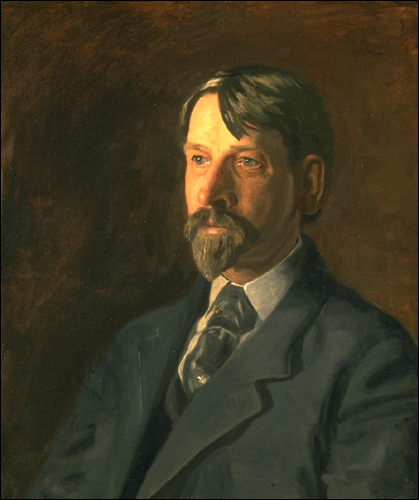
Portrait of Dr. Albert Colby Getchell by Thomas Eakins, 1907.

Cover of Getchell's 1916 book The Cloud Bird, illustrated by Edith Ballinger Price.

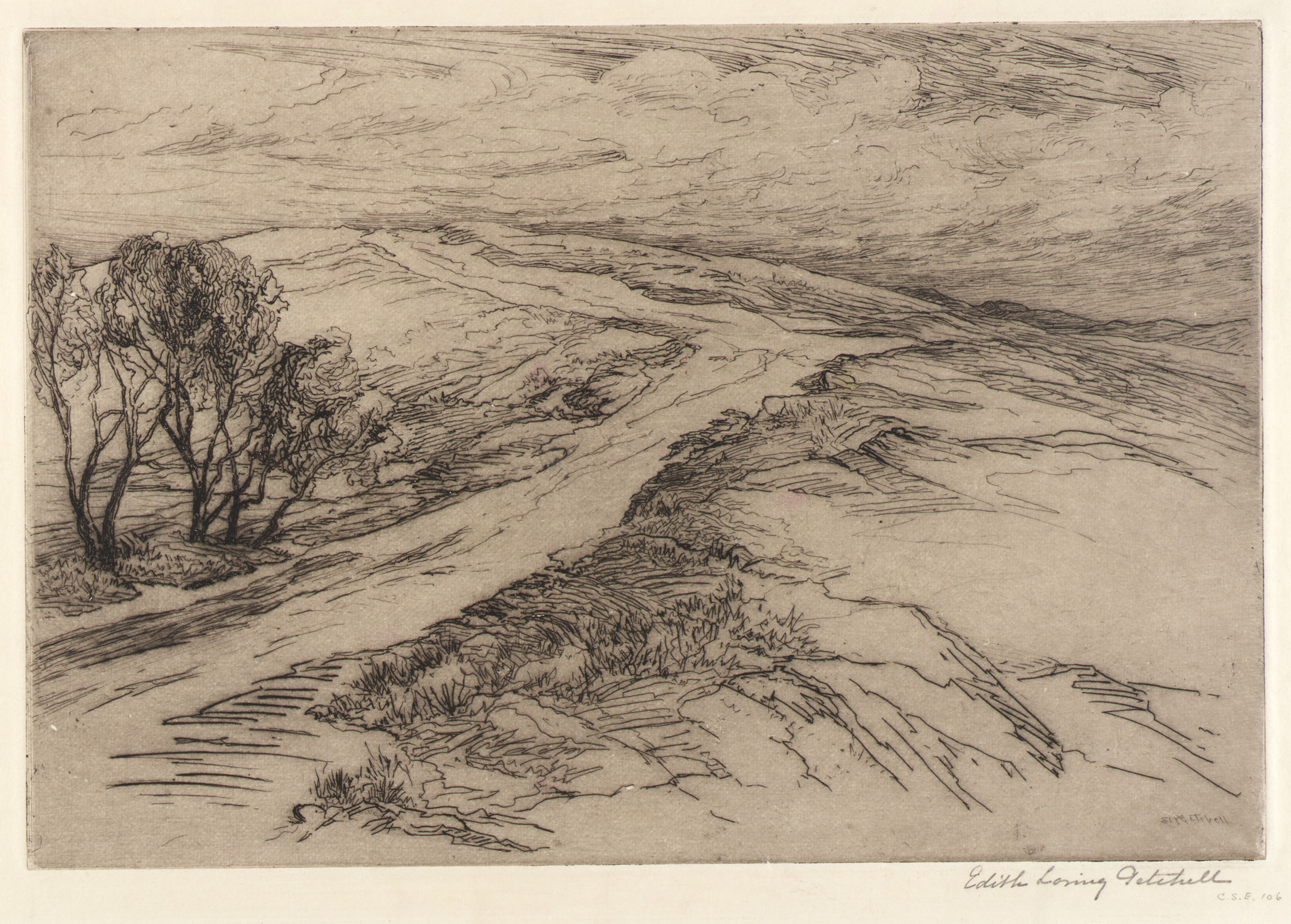
An undated etching called "A Windswept Road," by her mother, artist Edith Loring Getchell. Courtesy of the Smithsonian American Art Museum.

== See also ==
- Margaret Fuller
- Women in Journalism
- Women in Journalism Oral History Project
