= The Cruel Brother =

Traditional song

Song
- Genre: Folk

"The Cruel Brother" (Child 11, Roud 26) is a folk song.

== Synopsis ==
A knight (or lord) courts a lady. She tells him he must win the consent of her kin. He neglects that of her brother John. John mortally stabs her on her wedding day. She lives long enough to make various bequests, such as clothing to her mother, a fan to her sister; John invariably receives "a gallows to hang him on" and his wife may receive grief for her entire life and his children that they would have to beg, though the wife may get a widow's weeds and a quiet life, or his son the grace of God to be a man.

== Motifs ==
The bride's bequests are highly typical of ballads, and similar bequests are found in ballads throughout Europe.

== Field Recordings ==
Only four field recordings of the song by traditional singers are known to have been made:

- Bell Duncan of Ythenwells, Aberdeenshire, Scotland (1929–35, recorded by James Madison Carpenter)
- Polly Johnson of Wise, Virginia, USA (1939, recorded by Herbert Halpert)
- Edith Ballinger Price of New Jersey, USA (1945, recorded by Helen Hartness Flanders)
- Rose McCartin of Annalong, County Down, Northern Ireland (1970, recorded by Hugh Shields)

== See also ==
- List of the Child Ballads
