= Robert B. Harshe =

American art historian

Robert Bartholow Harshe (1879–1938) was an artist and museum professional who served as director of the Art Institute of Chicago from 1921 to 1938.

== Early life and education ==
Harshe was born in Salisbury, Missouri, the son of William and Emily (Robinson) Harshe. He graduated from the University of Missouri in 1899 and studied art at the School of the Art Institute of Chicago, the Art Students League of New York, the Colorossi Academy in Paris, and the Central School of Arts and Crafts in London. His media were etching and painting.

== Career ==
In 1902 he began as a supervisor for manual arts in Columbus, Georgia, and was then Instructor of Fine Arts at the University of Missouri. In 1908 he became Assistant Professor of Graphic Arts at Stanford University. In 1913 he became a co-founder and first president of the California Society of Etchers, the predecessor of the California Society of Printmakers.

Harshe served as Assistant Director of the Department of Fine Arts for the 1915 Panama Pacific International Exposition in San Francisco. That same year he became Director of the Oakland, California Public Museum, one of the predecessors of the Oakland Museum of California, and in 1916 he created and began directing the Oakland Art Gallery as an extension of the museum. He became Assistant Director of the Carnegie Institute of Pittsburgh from 1916 until 1920. He then became Assistant Director of the Art Institute of Chicago in 1920 under George Eggers. He became Director the following year, and remained in that position until his death in 1938. As Director of the museum, he acted as Chief Curator for Paintings and Sculpture.
