= California Society of Printmakers =

Non-profit arts organization for printmakers and printmaking

- Formation: 1912; 114 years ago (as "California Society of Etchers")
- Founders: Robert B. Harshe, Pedro J. [de] Lemos, Ralph Stackpole, Gottardo Piazzoni
- Type: Non-profit
- Legal status: Active
- Purpose: Supporting printmaking artists, Educating the public about printmaking
- Headquarters: San Francisco
- Location: United States
- Products: Printmaking
- Members: 270 artist members, plus honorary, friend, business, and institutional members
- Board of directors: caprintmakers.org/board-of-directors
- Staff: None
- Volunteers: Board of Directors
- Website: caprintmakers.org

The California Society of Printmakers (CSP) is the oldest continuously operating association of printmakers and friends of printmakers in the United States. CSP is a 501(c)(3) non-profit arts organization with an international membership of print artists and supporters of the art of fine printmaking. CSP promotes professional development and opportunity for printmakers, and educates artists and the public about printmaking. New members are admitted by portfolio review. Friends, Institutional and Business members are admitted by fee. CSP is based in the San Francisco Bay Area, California.

== Early history: American print clubs (printmakers societies) and California Society of Etchers (CSE) ==
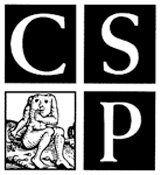
Logo 2004-.

American print clubs or printmaking societies were prolific in the 19th century. Their impetus was primarily exhibition, technical exchange, shared equipment, and the promotion of printmaking as a fine art, as opposed to a method of reproducing images. The invention of photography meant that reproduction of art works could be achieved photographically instead of through the graphic arts of etching, engraving, and lithography. Thus, these methods of printmaking were freed from their reproducing role to develop as pure fine arts. In addition to the rise of printmaking societies/clubs, individual printmaking artists also sought to distinguish their work as a fine art, as opposed to a craft. Generally these artists from the 19th century were referred to as painter-etchers. Nineteenth century printmaking societies in the United States were the New York Etchers Club (1877), Boston Etchers Club (1880?), Philadelphia Society of Etchers (1880), Brooklyn Etchers Club (1881), Brooklyn Scratchers Club (1882), Society of American Etchers (1888), Cincinnati Etchers Club (circa 1890).

Early 20th century printmaking societies were the very influential Chicago Society of Etchers (1910), begun and promoted by Bertha Jaques. After the Chicago Society, a flurry of other printmakers' societies followed. Next was the California Society of Etchers (1912), the Los Angeles group called the Printmakers of California (1914), and the Brooklyn Society of Etchers (1915).

The California Society of Etchers (CSE) merged with Bay Printmakers Society in 1968 when the current name, California Society of Printmakers (CSP), was adopted. Throughout the 1950s and well into the 1980s short histories of the society penned by various elected officers always referred to CSE/CSP as " the second oldest" continuous operating club in the United States. However, these historians failed to mention what the oldest society was. A little research revealed that the oldest American society of printmakers was the Chicago Society of Etchers. The California Society of Etchers was very aware of its Chicago predecessor, as the Chicago founder Bertha Jaques encouraged printmakers to establish their own local societies. Jaques also joined the California Society of Etchers in 1913, when non-resident members were first admitted. The Chicago Society of Etchers ceased operations in 1956, leaving California Society of Printmakers as the longest lived printmakers' society in the U.S.

== Origins of the California Society of Etchers (CSE) ==
The California Society of Etchers (CSE) was founded in San Francisco in December 1912 and announced in the San Francisco Chronicle on January 19, 1913 ("Etchers Form a State Organization", p. 27). Several sources cite an earlier 1911 date, such Marilyn S. Kushner's detailed chapter, "Genesis of the Twentieth-Century Print Club", although she does not cite her source. Robert B. Harshe, founder, and later first president of California Society of Etchers, leaves the founding date ambiguous in his chapter in the 1916 book, Art in California. His chapter mentions the four years of the society, although the chapter itself is undated. Mary Millman and Dave Bohn's very thorough biography of John W. Winkler, cited above, supports the CSE founding date of 1912.

The founding of CSE is intimately connected with the Panama–Pacific International Exposition (PPIE), a world's fair held in 1915 in San Francisco to showcase the city's recovery from the 1906 earthquake. It was Joseph Pennell, scheduled to be a juror for this event, who inspired a handful of local printmakers to launch the California Society of Etchers in preparation for that great event. Pennell, perhaps the best known American etcher, local to New York City and London, had traveled to Panama to sketch the construction of the Canal, then traveled to San Francisco where he produced a series of etchings of San Francisco, exhibiting them in 1912 in San Francisco. It is said that his presence in San Francisco achieved its purpose: encouraging local printmakers to get prepared and organized to take advantage of the promotional opportunities afforded by the upcoming San Francisco PPIE, the largest display of original art work of its time.

The four founders of the California Society of Etchers were artist colleagues: Robert B. Harshe (1879–1938), himself an etcher and then art professor at Stanford University; Pedro Joseph J. Lemos (1882–1954), then etcher and professor at the San Francisco Institute of Art (now San Francisco Art Institute); Gottardo Piazzoni (1872–1945), painter and muralist; and Ralph Stackpole (1885–1973), a sculptor, printmaker, and at that time Piazzoni's studio assistant.

The young organization began exhibiting immediately, with its first annual exhibition in April 1913 at Vickery, Atkins and Torrey Print Gallery, 550 Sutter Street, San Francisco. Its second annual exhibition was also held in 1913.

Admission of artist members to the Society was originally not by juried portfolio review, as it is today. Then the society was open to all artists, painters and sculptors alike, any artist who had experience with etching techniques. Artist membership was expanded beyond California in 1913 to include artists throughout the United States as well as American printmakers living abroad. It is not clear when precisely CSE began accepting international printmakers, but 1964 was CSE's first major international print competition.

The primary purpose of the Society was exhibition and education, promoting printmaking as a fine art, and sharing workspace and equipment. Non-artist members, then as now, were accepted as Associate or Patron members. Membership in both artist and associate categories grew quickly. The four founding members grew to fifteen charter members, those who were members at the time of publication of the first Constitution of the CSE in 1915; among these charter members was Gertrude Partington Albright. By 1925 there were 41 artist members and 107 associate members. Among the most prominent associate members were the Moore S. Achenbachs, the Sigmund Sterns, Dr. Leon Kolb, the Milton Esbergs, the Zellerbachs, Albert M. Bender, and institutions such as the De Young Museum, Oakland Public Library, and the Print Club of Albany New York.

== Mid-Century ==
California Society of Etchers (CSE) had enjoyed a dedicated executive secretary, Nicholas Dunphy (1896–1955), for more than 20 years, from 1932 to his death in 1955. Understandably, Dunphy's death created a huge hole in CSE's leadership. Nonetheless, annual membership shows continued except for the year of his death, with Elizabeth Ginno (1911–1991) becoming secretary after Dunphy's death. Ginno, Ginno's husband John W. Winkler, aka Winks (1890–1979), and Mark Luca (1918–2005), were active CSE members between 1955 and 1968, the year that CSE merged with Bay Printmakers Society to form California Society of Printmakers (CSP)

== Bay Printmakers Society ==
In 1955 two graduate students from Oakland's California College of Arts and Crafts (now the California College of the Arts) were eager for exhibition opportunities. According to Jean Womack, former CSP historian, Mel Strawn (1929–2020) and Will Petersen (1928–1994) placed an ad in a national art magazine announcing themselves as the Bay Printmakers Society hosting a national exhibition. Work was to be sent to the address cited even though a location for the actual show had not yet been established. As the work poured in, Paul Mills, then director of the Oakland Museum of Art, provided the venue, and remained a strong supporter during the next five national exhibitions. The first exhibition was juried by John Paul Jones, respected printmaker from UCLA. The jurying took place at the home of Eldon Mills, friend of Mel Strawn, and an active supporter of Bay Printmakers; it was monitored/observed by Sabro Hasegawa, a visiting teacher from Japan at CCAC.

Charter members of the Bay Printmakers Society included artists Beth Van Hoesen (1926–2010 ), John Ihle (1925–2002), Karl Kasten (1916–2010 ), Nathan Oliveira (1928–2010 ), Gordon Cook (1927–1985), Virginia Vandegrift, and art collector Eldon Mills. Their activities were focused exclusively on the national show. Between 1955 and 1960, Bay Printmakers generally had one-person juries for their open national shows. After John Paul Jones, BPS jurors were printmaker Leonard Edmondson (1916–2002); poet Kenneth Patchen (1911–1972); and Director of the Achenbach Foundation for Graphic Arts Ernst Gunter Troche (1909–1971).

Between 1959 and 1965 CSE created three-person jury teams for their national open, juried print exhibitions. These generally consisted of one artist member, one critic, and one museum curator. In 1959 the jurors were Ernest Freed, John Winkler, and John LaPlante. In 1960 the jurors were Doel Reed, E. Gunter Troche, and Raymond E. Lewis. Other CSE national annual jurors were: 1961 Gordon Cook; 1965 Wayne Thiebaud, Alan Lynch, and Moses Lasky.

== Merger History: California Society of Etchers Joins Bay Printmakers ==
In 1968 Ginno invited Bay Printmaker member John Ihle to join CSE, probably the first dual member of both organizations. Ginno then approached Bay Printmaker president Karl Kasten, who had help create the etching studios at the new San Francisco State University campus in 1949 and then joined UC Berkeley's art department in printmaking, about the possibility of merging CSE and BPS. Kasten took up the suggestion immediately. Both organizations met at the Oakland Museum in 1968 and approved the merger, electing Kasten as the first president of the new society, which they named California Society of Printmakers. A new constitution was created, and exhibitions, education of members and the public, and publications continued.

== CSP Today ==
CSP is an artist-run organization. Programming is funded by annual membership dues and application fees. Currently CSP maintains close to 300 artist members, 30 honorary members, 20 lifetime members, and 10 friend and institutional members.

Recent and continuing programs include: educationally focused public outreach and engagement activities, artist residencies, commissioned prints, studio visits and demonstrations, visiting artist talks and workshops, portfolio projects, shelter-in-place grants, membership engagement grants, and a wide variety of exhibition opportunities. In 2020, a program titled Brief Histories of California Printmakers, was initiated to address racial and gender disparity in California's rich history of printmaking.

Membership benefits include self-managed website portfolios, receipt of all publications, and a wide range of engagement and professional opportunities.

CSP publishes a journal The California Printmaker (ISSN: 2769-7894) which became an annual full color publication edited by Susan Leone Howe in 2015. There have been a variety of newsletters including a previous semi-annual California Printmaker News brief. Currently CSP publishes a bi-monthly e-newsletter, Relevant Ink.

== Archives ==
California Society of Printmakers maintains two separate archives: one of its records, the other of prints. The California Society of Printmakers Records were given to The Bancroft Library, University of California, Berkeley by the California Society of Printmakers in January 1988. Additions were made in 1991, 1992, 1994, 1995, 1996, 1997, 2001, 2003, 2004, 2005, and 2007. A finding aid to the records may be found at the Online Archive of California.

A small archive of prints is maintained by CSP at a Bay Area storage facility. An inventory may be found on the CSP website.

== Additional sources ==
- Art in California: a survey of American art with specific reference to California painting, sculpture, and architecture past and present, particularly as those arts are represented at the Panama–Pacific International Exposition. San Francisco: R.L. Bernier, 1916. Especially the chapters “The California Society of Etchers” by Robert B. Harshe, pp. 116–120 and "California and its etchers – what they mean to each other” by Pedro J. Lemos, pp 113–115.
- California Society of Printmakers: One Hundred Years, 1913-2013 (ISBN 9780989540810)
- California Society of Printmakers Records, Bancroft Library, University of California, Berkeley
- Kushner, Marilyn S., "Genesis of the Twentieth-Century Print Clubs, and its major importance to the field of graphic art", in American Identities: Twentieth-Century Prints from the Nancy Gray Sherrill, Class of `954, Collection. Wellesley, MA : Davis Museum and Cultural Center, Wellesley College, c2004. 310 pages.
