= New York Etching Club =

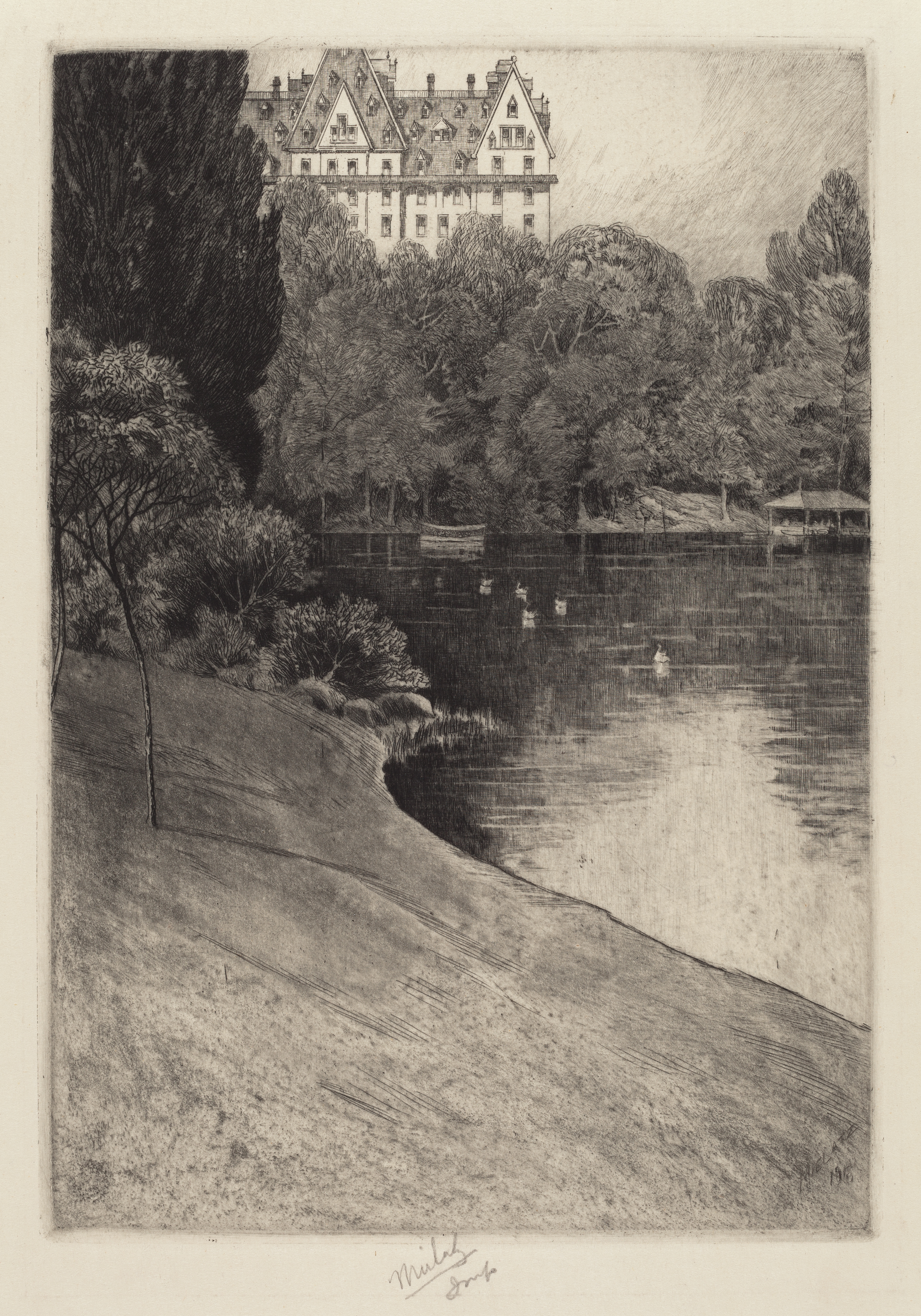
- Bit of Central Park, an etching by Charles Frederick William Mielatz, 1918.
- Formation: May 2, 1877
- Founder: Robert Swain Gifford
- Founded at: New York
- Type: Professional organization
- Headquarters: New York
- Formerly called: New York Etchers Club

The New York Etching Club, formally New York Etchers Club, was one of the earliest professional organization in America devoted to the medium of etching. Its founders were inspired by the Etching revival that had blossomed in France and England in the middle of the 19th century. The purpose of the club was to create and promote etchings that did not merely reproduce existing paintings, but were original creations of art in their own right.

== History ==
The first meeting of the New York Etchers Club took place in the studio of James David Smillie on May 2, 1877. An etching by Robert Swain Gifford was printed on a small press under the supervision of Dr. Leroy Milton Yale Jr. Eventually, bi-monthly meetings moved to the studio of Henry Farrer where etchings were printed from a press that Farrer built. The club was formed by Dr. Yale, Robert Swain Gifford and James David Smillie, with Yale as its first President.

Other important members of the New York Etching Club included Charles Adams Platt, Thomas Moran, Samuel Colman, Kruseman Van Elten, William Merritt Chase, Frederick Stuart Church, Stephen Parrish, Joseph Pennell, J. C. Nicoll, Charles Frederick William Mielatz, Walter Satterlee, and Thomas Waterman Wood. For most members, etching was an important side-interest to their main occupation as painters. That was not the case, however, for Edith Loring Getchell and Mary Nimmo Moran, two other artists of note who were both primarily etchers.

The New York Etching Club held regular exhibitions through the early 1890s in which members and invited guests displayed their etchings for sale to the general public. From 1879 to 1881, works by members of the New York Etching Club were also featured in a periodical called The American Art Review. Published under the leadership of Sylvester Rosa Koehler, the first curator of prints at the Museum of Fine Arts, Boston, it further popularized etching as a medium and the New York Etching Club as a professional organization. The success of the New York Etching Club helped spawn similar organizations in other major American cities in the late 19th century.

== See also ==
- List of American print clubs
- Etching revival
- Etching
