= Edith Ballinger Price =

American writer and illustrator (1897–1997)

- Born: April 26, 1897; New Brunswick, New Jersey
- Died: September 29, 1997 (aged 100); Virginia Beach, Virginia
- Known for: Writing and illustrating children's books, helping to found the Brownies
- Children: Mary Burchey Perry (adopted)

Edith Ballinger Price (1897–1997) was a prolific writer and illustrator of children's books, best known for the imaginative stories and illustrations she created for 37 different books and stories. The granddaughter of landscape painter William Trost Richards, who first inspired her to draw, Price trained at Boston's School of the Museum of Fine Arts, the New York Art Students League and the National Academy of Design. Oft-published in general-interest magazines like Colliers and those aimed at children, like St. Nicholas Magazine, she was also notable as one of the chief founders of the Brownies, the junior version of the Girl Scouts.

== Career ==
Price's back list includes her first novel Blue Magic (1919), the Bottle Man (1920), Silver Shoal Light, The Happy Venture (1920), and My Lady Lee (1925). She also collaborated with other authors, including Margaret C. Getchell for the 1916 book Cloudbird, the dream-like adventures of a small girl named Dorothy Ann and the animals she meets. For the book, Price's design and illustration appeared in conventional spots at the beginning and end of chapters, as well as in more unexpected places where, depending on the content, small silhouettes of bears, roosters, herons, turtles and other creatures jumped into small spaces within the text itself.

Two years later, Price published Blue Magic, first in serialized form for St. Nicholas Magazine in 1918, then the following year for The Century Company. She liked illustrating but was seldom given the opportunity to work on the drawings related to her own works. "She taught artistic autonomy at the school of the Art Association of Newport, of which she was a council member for twenty-eight years." In 1962 Price moved to Virginia Beach, Virginia, where she worked at A.R.E. Press, a publisher of the works of psychic Edgar Cayce."

== Other pursuits ==
A devotee of the Girl Scouts, she helped found the Brownie Scouts program, which was designed for children not yet old enough to join the Girl Scouts. She authored their first handbook, as well as several Girl Scout-related magazines, including the American Girl, Girl's Guide Gazette and Girls Today, and she served as the organization's national chair from 1925 to 1932.

Price knew a large number of traditional folk songs, which she was recorded singing by the folklorist Helen Hartness Flanders in 1945. Songs in her repertoire included some of the famous Child Ballads such as "The Two Sisters", "Edward", "The Cruel Brother", "Gypsy Davey" and "Jamie Douglas", all of which can be heard online via the Helen Hartness Flanders Collection.

== Gallery ==
(Selection was limited by availability.)

Illustrations, Books and a Book Plate

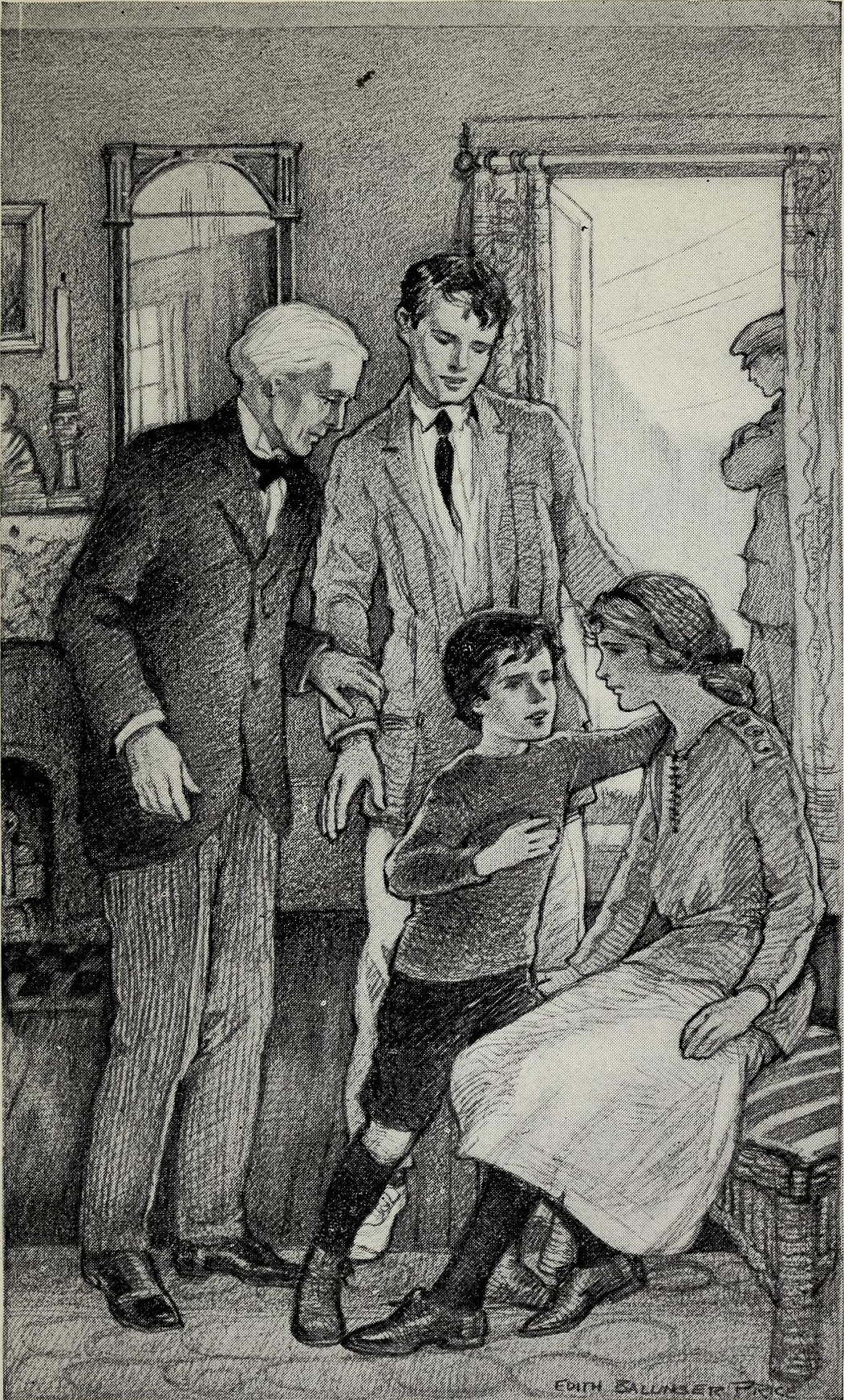
Illustration for The Happy Venture

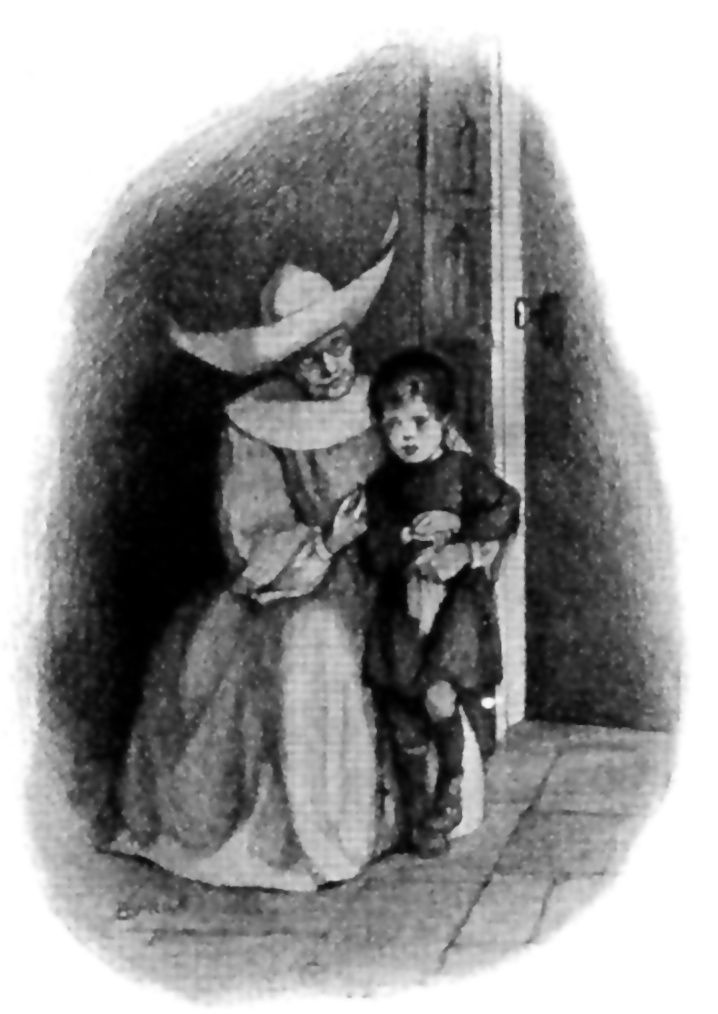
Illustration for the short story "Sister Eloise"

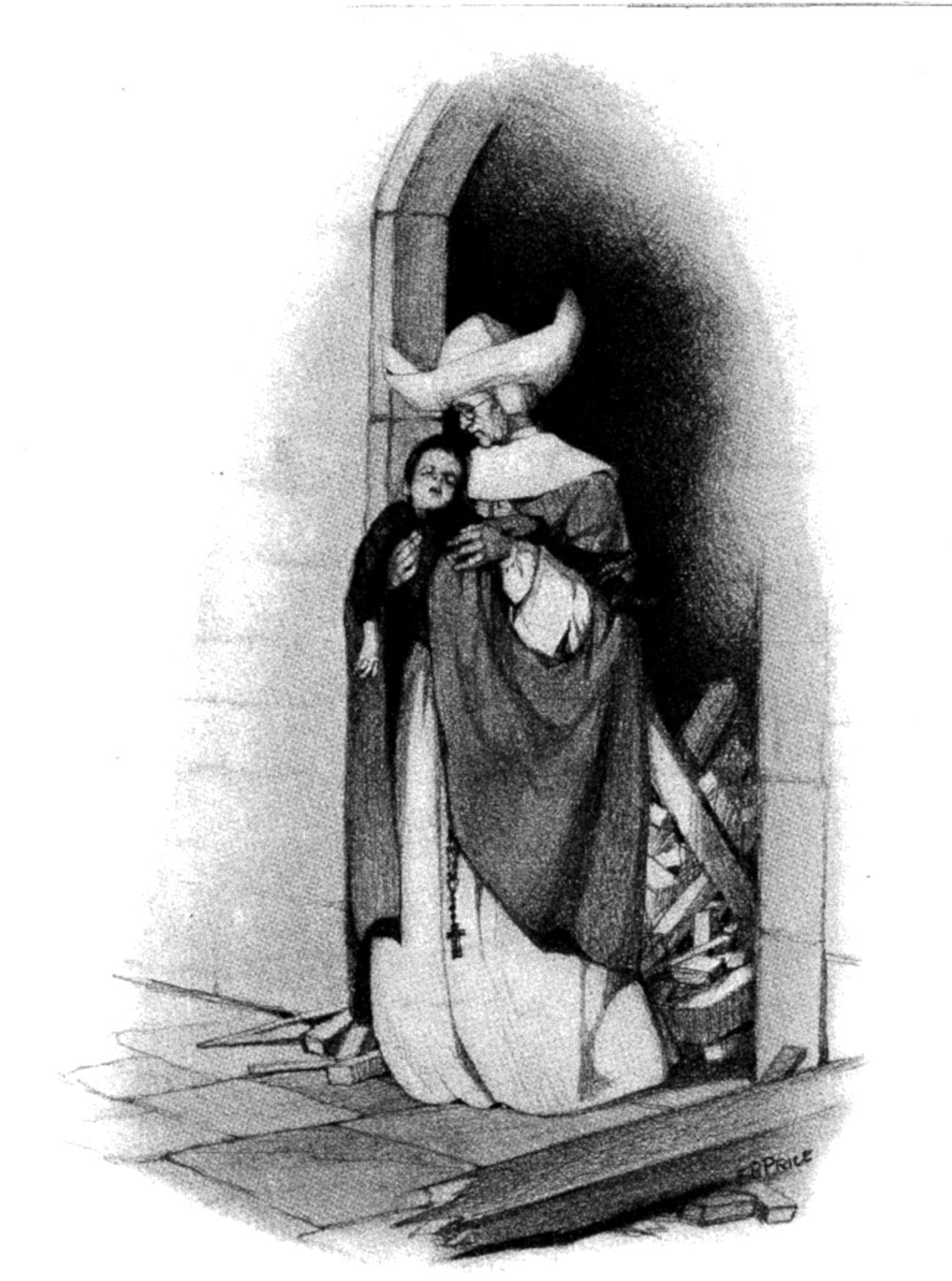
Illustration for the short story "Sister Eloise"

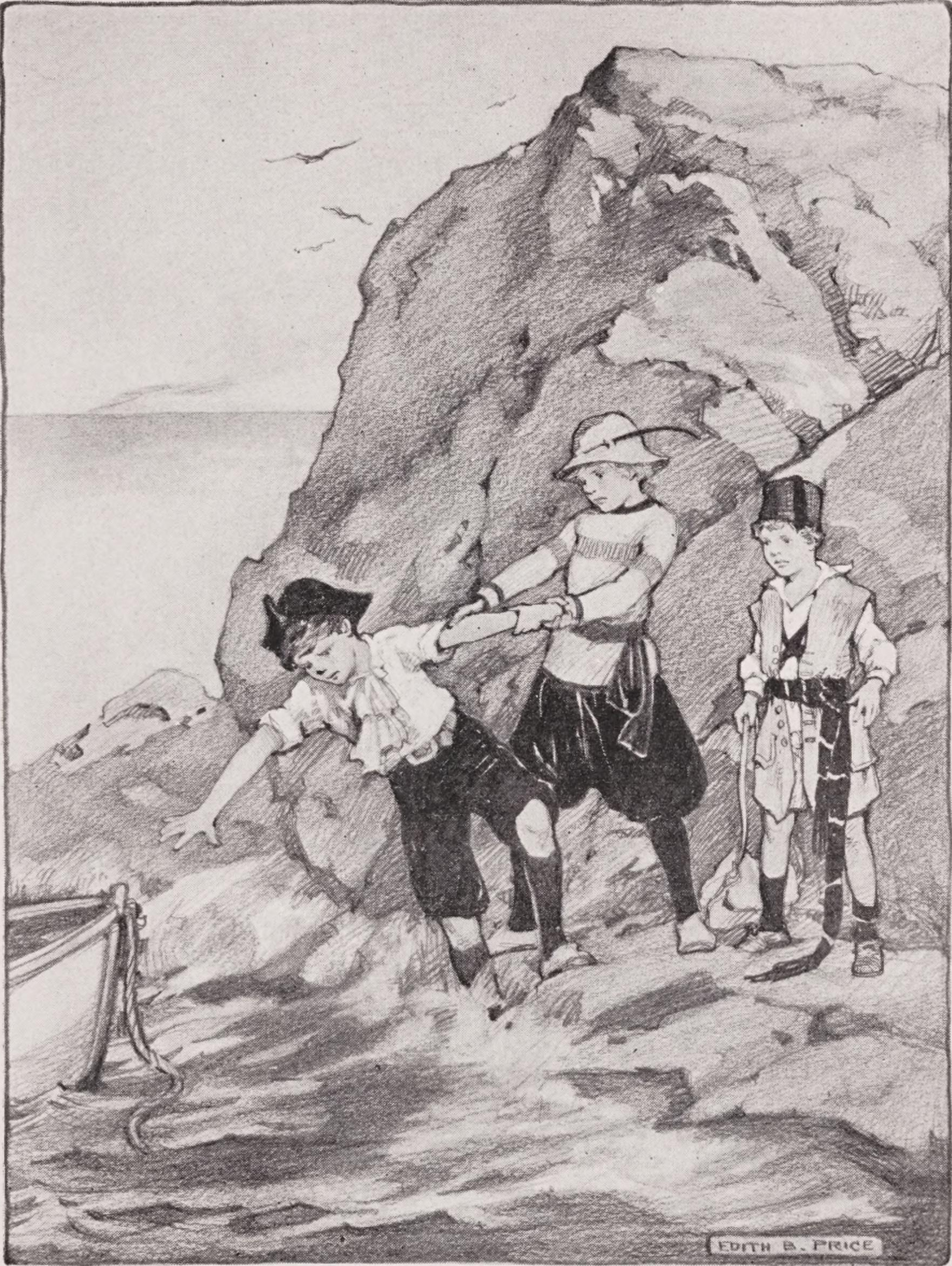
Illustration from Us and the Bottleman

Fortune of the Indies

Us and the Bottleman

The Happy Venture

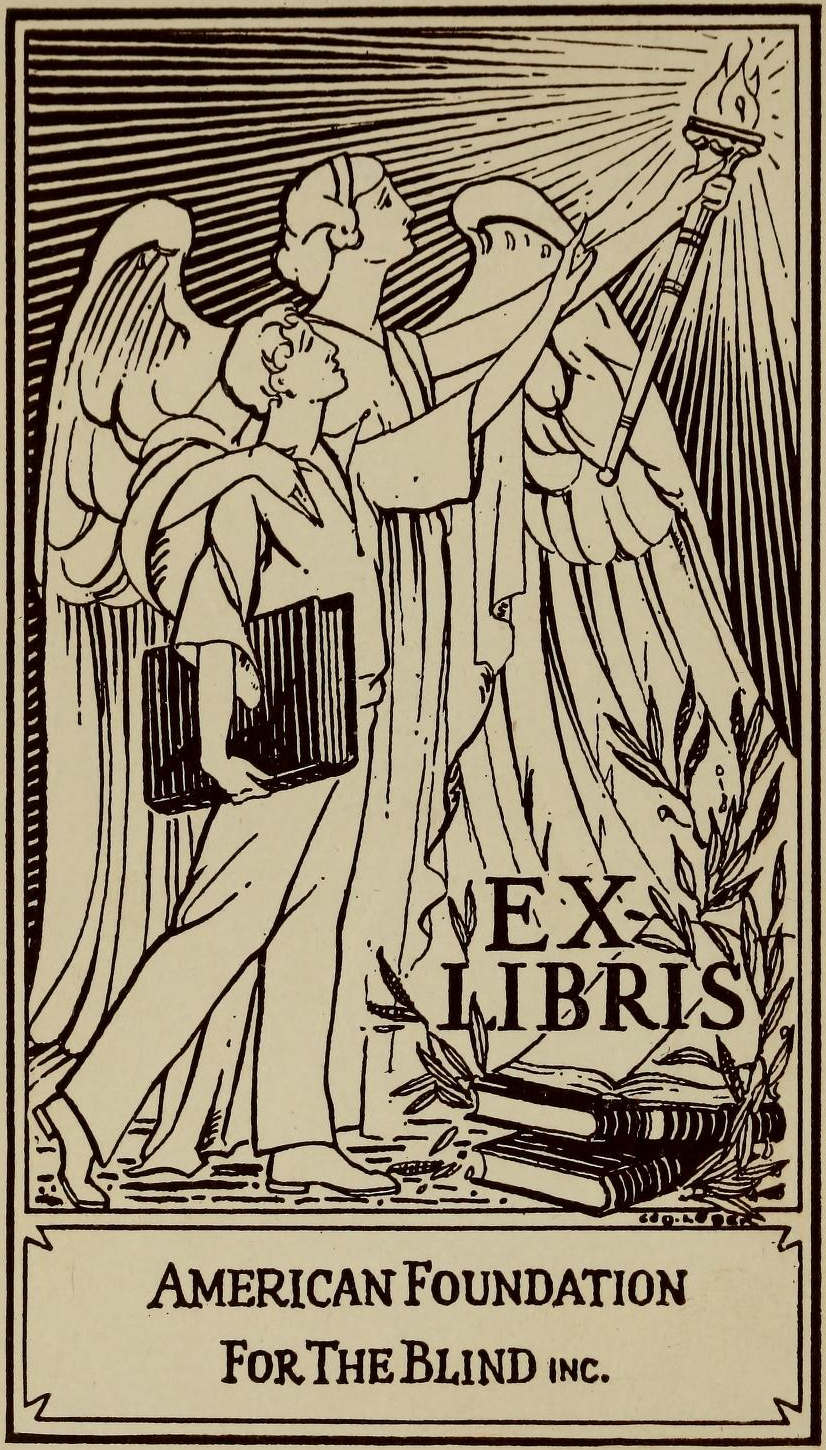
A book plate in honor of both the American Foundation for the Blind and Price's daughter

A bear and a swan peer in from the margin of the page in Cloudbird, which Price illustrated
