= Bertha Jaques =

American writer (1863–1941)

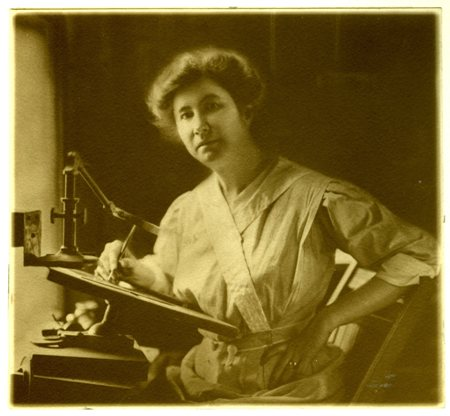
- Bertha Jaques in her studio, 1912
- Born: October 24, 1863; Covington, Ohio
- Died: March 30, 1941 (aged 77); Chicago, Illinois
- Education: self-taught
- Known for: etcher, printmaker, photographer, poet

Bertha Evelyn Jaques (October 24, 1863 – March 30, 1941) was an American etcher and cyanotype photographer. Jaques helped found the Chicago Society of Etchers, an organization that would become internationally significant for promoting etching as a popular printmaking technique. She is best known for her hand-colored botanical prints and scenes from her foreign and domestic travels.

== Life ==
Bertha Jaques (née Clausen) was born in Covington, Ohio. She enjoyed a comfortable and independent life, traveling to the United Kingdom by herself in September 1889. She met her husband, William K. Jaques, in 1883 and they moved to Cedar Rapids, Iowa, in 1885. There, Jaques wrote poems for the Railway Conductors' Monthly until 1889 when they moved to Chicago for her husband to practice dentistry. They were married on Thanksgiving Day, 1889.

In 1893, Jaques attended the World's Columbian Exposition and was inspired by the prints of James Abbott McNeill Whistler, James Tissot, and Anders Zorn. At this time etching was considered out of style in America. Therefore, Jaques largely taught herself how to etch plates and make prints. She kept detailed records of her progress and the results of how variables affected the finished image. She began to etch on kettle copper with her husband's help making suitable tools. Without a press she enlisted several men to stand on the plates to transfer the image to paper, although this proved to be an unsatisfactory method.

Jaques acquired her first printing press in 1894. William Jaques was very supportive of his wife's artistic career. He purchased her equipment and materials, and also hired domestic help to allow Jaques to focus entirely on her art. She made her first prints in 1894 and would continue to produce 461 unique plates during her career which ended in 1939. In addition to her etchings, she also made more than a thousand cyanotype photographs.

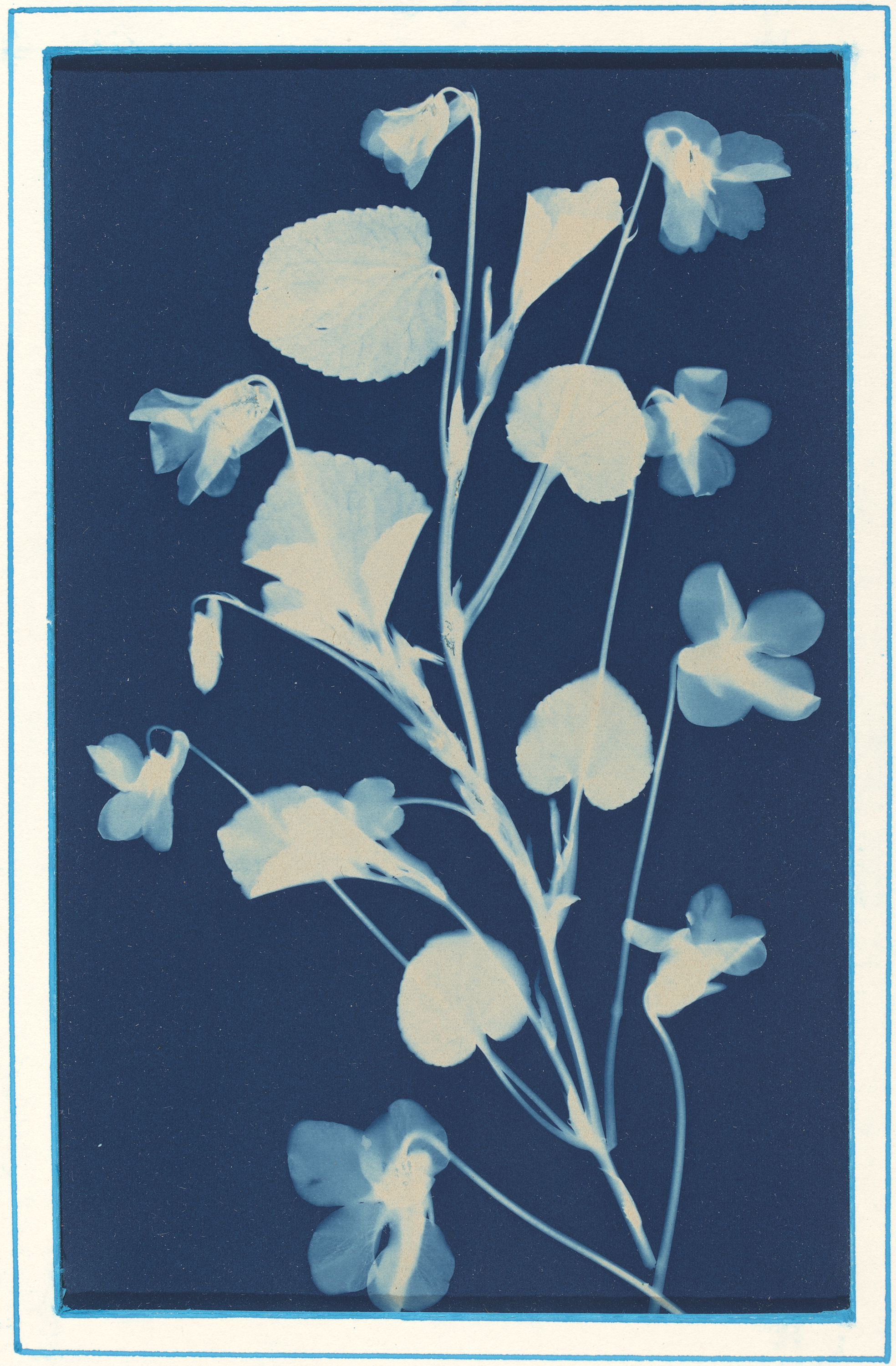
Bertha Evelyn Jaques, Untitled, c. 1900, cyanotype, NGA 136408

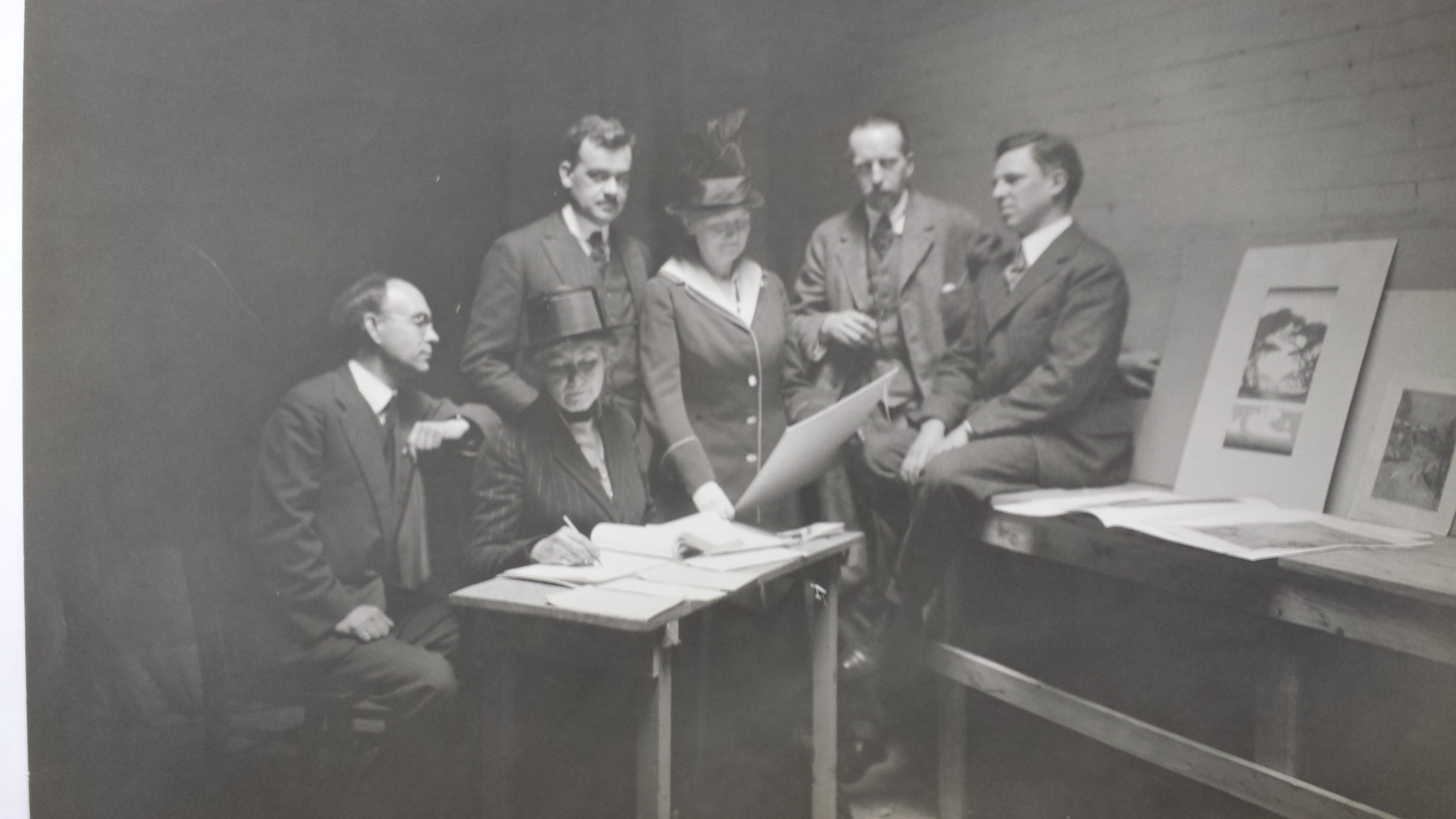
Bertha Jaques (seated) on a jury for the Chicago Society of Etchers, 1919; photograph from the archives of the Cedar Rapids Museum of Art

To popularize the medium of etching, Jaques—along with other etchers in Chicago in 1909—formed the Needle Club, an informal collective of etchers passionate about reintroducing the American public to the art of etching. Later, Jaques would become a founding member of the Chicago Society of Etchers in 1910, an organization that was primarily responsible for showing members' etchings at the Art Institute of Chicago; she served as Secretary from its foundation through the 1930s. The Society would attract international members and renown with Jaques herself as the driving force behind much of its success at popularizing etching in 20th-century America.

Thanks to her growing reputation in Chicago Jaques was invited to speak on the nature of etchings throughout the country. Her tours brought her some degree of notoriety, being named a visiting celebrity to Nebraska. From 1913 to 1917 she toured throughout the country giving lectures in states including Indiana, South Carolina, Kansas, and Georgia.

Although self-taught, she drew inspiration from the etchings of Rembrandt, whom she held in unsurpassed regard as a printmaker. In a published lecture from 1935 she extols the nature of line as being one of the primary elements of art, as "the most basic utterance of life." According to Jaques lines can evoke any emotion and it forms the basis of human creativity from primitive symbols to letters to pictures. Her lecture ends with a brief plea for the listeners to visit galleries and view prints up close to appreciate the use of lines, artistic composition, and to become familiar with what a "good" print looked like.

She also became a central figure in the wider community of etchers, and many artists would travel to her home, including many visits from Helen Hyde. She became a mentor, collector, and promoter of several younger artists, including James Swann whom she entrusted giving the position of secretary in 1937. Bertha Jaques died in Chicago in 1941.

A portrait of Jaques by Nelly McKenzie Tolman is currently owned by the Smithsonian American Art Museum.

== Work ==
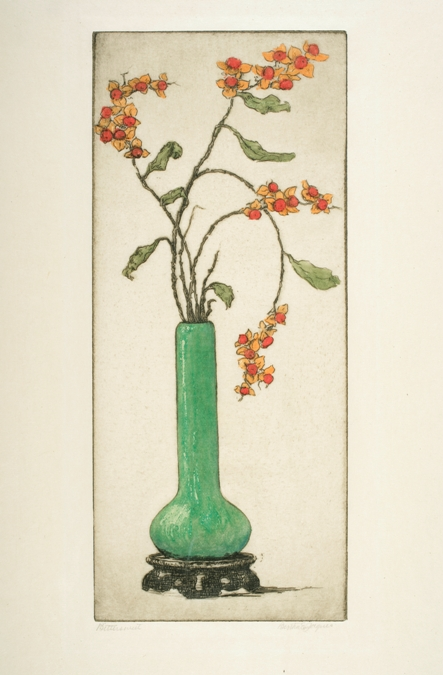
Bittersweet, 1920, hand-colored etching by Bertha Jaques, from the collection of the Cedar Rapids Museum of Art

Throughout her career as a printmaker she continued to write poems, her first creative outlet. She combined these passions in Christmas cards and self-published books of poems. Her personality comes through most clearly in her poems, where her strong-will, wit, and practicality are evident. Her images of botanically accurate plants and uncommon scenes of the alleys, docks, and markets of foreign cities demonstrate her significance among artists of the early 20th century.

Jaques kept precise records of her experiments with printing throughout her career. She experimented with many aspects of etching, particularly surface tone and acid biting. As one of the early etchers during the American resurgence of the medium her process demonstrates an artist exploring the medium to its fullest. Perhaps more than other artists, it is worthwhile to study the different states of each image she produced. Each state represents the artist's advancement in composition or technical prowess at a time when Jaques was among the first to rediscover such techniques.

Her choice of subject included botanical prints and landscapes. Both were typical for female artists of the time who had limited or no access to the subjects of their male counterparts. Jaques, however, approached both subjects atypically. Her botanical prints are scientifically precise and removed from context or background. Her landscapes have a focus on urban, industrial settings. Docks, coal barges, foreign markets, narrow alleys, and backyards are not common subjects for female artists to depict in such cities as Chicago, Cairo, Venice, and London. Jaques, however, showed the working areas of a city in a picturesque way that is just as captivating as her images of tourist-friendly scenes.

Her works are in private collections and sold occasionally through auction. The world's largest public collection of the work of Bertha Jaques is owned by the Cedar Rapids Museum of Art. The museum owns more than 400 unique prints in addition to multiple states of many images. In honor of her 150th birthday, the Cedar Rapids Museum of Art presented a year-long retrospective of her work in 2013.

== Selected exhibitions ==
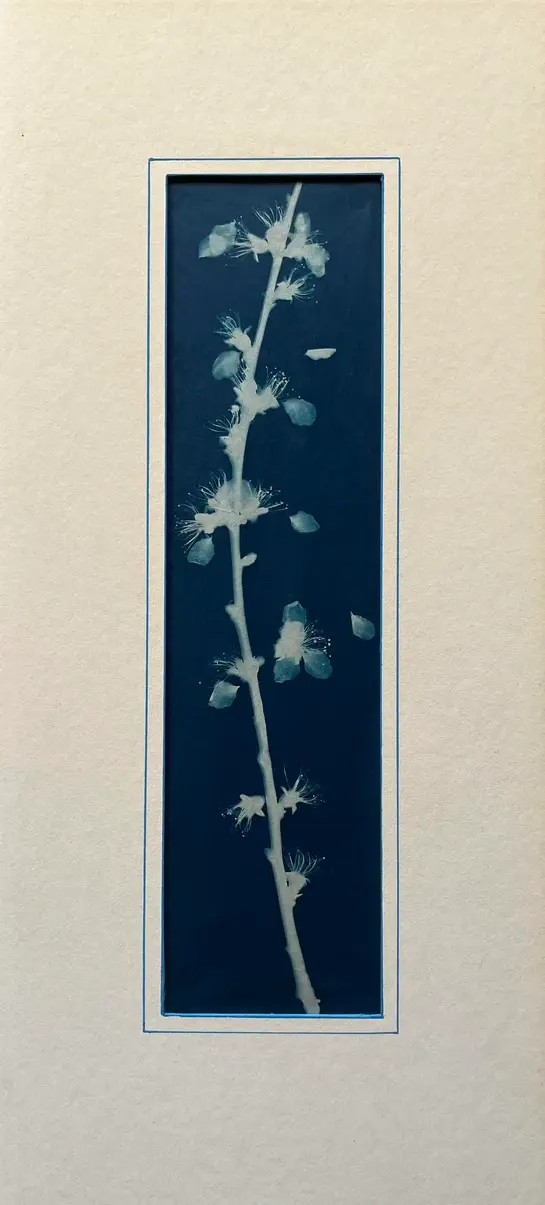
Peach Blossoms (cyanotype, 1906)

- Bertha Jaques: Eye on America (Sep. 28, 2013 – Jan. 5, 2014), Cedar Rapids Museum of Art
- Bertha Jaques: Eye on the World (May 25 – Sep. 15 2013), Cedar Rapids Museum of Art
- Bertha Jaques: Botanical Prints and Photographs (Jan. 19 – May 12, 2013), Cedar Rapids Museum of Art
- Americans Abroad (Feb. 2 – May 11, 2008), Cedar Rapids Museum of Art
- Bertha E. Jaques (1863-1941): An American Printmaker—A Retrospective, (April - May 1982), Gerhard Wurzer Gallery, Houston, TX
- Memorial Exhibition (June 3–30, 1941), Smithsonian Institution National Museum of Natural History

== Sources ==
- Tovell, Rosemarie L. (1996). A new class of art: The artist's print in Canadian art, 1877-1920. Ottawa: National Gallery of Canada. p. 77. ISBN 9780888846556.
