= Stephen Parrish =

American painter (1846–1938)

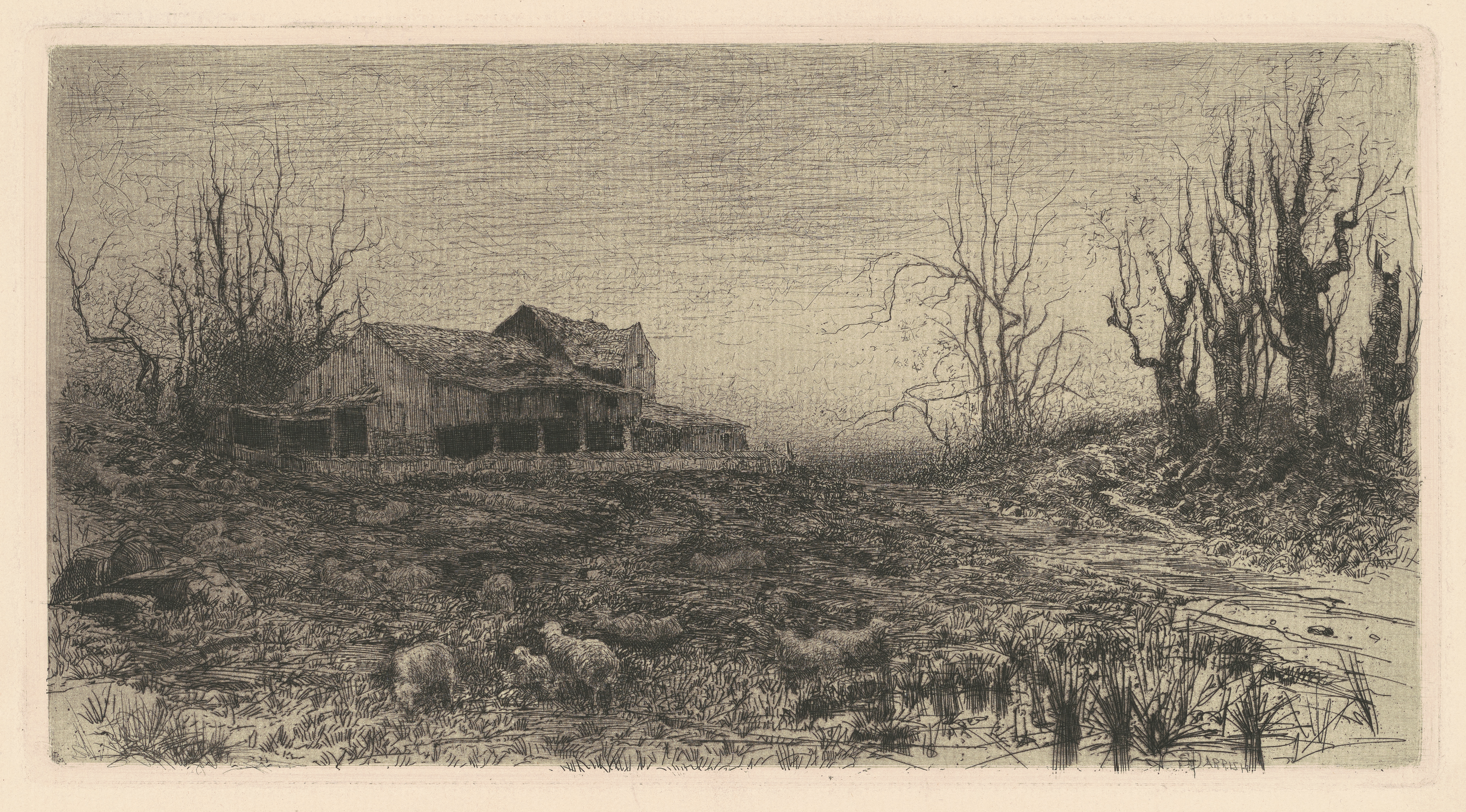
- Stephen Parrish's etching "November," 1880.
- Born: Also known as Stephen Windsor Parrish, Stephen M. Parrish and Stephen Maxfield Parrish; July 9, 1846; Philadelphia, Pennsylvania
- Died: May 15, 1938 (aged 91); Cornish, New Hampshire
- Known for: Printmaker, painter, illustrator
- Spouse: Elizabeth Bancroft
- Children: Artist Maxfield Parrish

Stephen Parrish (1846–1938) was an American painter and etcher who became one of the 19th century's most celebrated printmakers during the "American Etching Revival." Privately trained by painter and animal etcher Peter Moran, Parrish was best known for his landscape etching of "Eastern North America, particularly the harbors and villages of New England and Canada," and as the father of painter and illustrator Maxfield Parrish.

== Career ==
Parrish was engaged in mercantile pursuits until he was 30, when he applied himself to art, studying for a year with a local teacher.

In 1878, he attended the Pennsylvania Academy in Philadelphia, and in 1879 at the National Academy in New York City. He soon turned his attention also to etching, and in December 1879, produced his first plate. After that he applied himself to both branches of art, exhibiting in New York City, Boston, Philadelphia, London, Liverpool, Paris, Munich, Dresden, and Vienna.

== Memberships ==
- New York Etching Club
- Society of Painter-Etchers of London

== Personal life ==
Born to a Philadelphia Quaker family, Parrish married in 1869, and his only child, artist Frederick Maxfield Parrish was born in 1870.

== Etchings ==
Parrish's etchings include: Northern Moorland and Low Tide — Bay of Fundy (1882); Coast of New Brunswick, Winter Evening — Windsor, Nova Scotia, and Bethlehem (1884); London Bridge and On the Thames (1886); and A Gloucestar Wharf (1887). Among his paintings are November (1880); In Winter Quarters (1884); Low Tide — Evening (1885); On the Rance, Brittany (1886); and The Road to Perry's Peak. He also frequently made etchings out of earlier sketches and drawings.

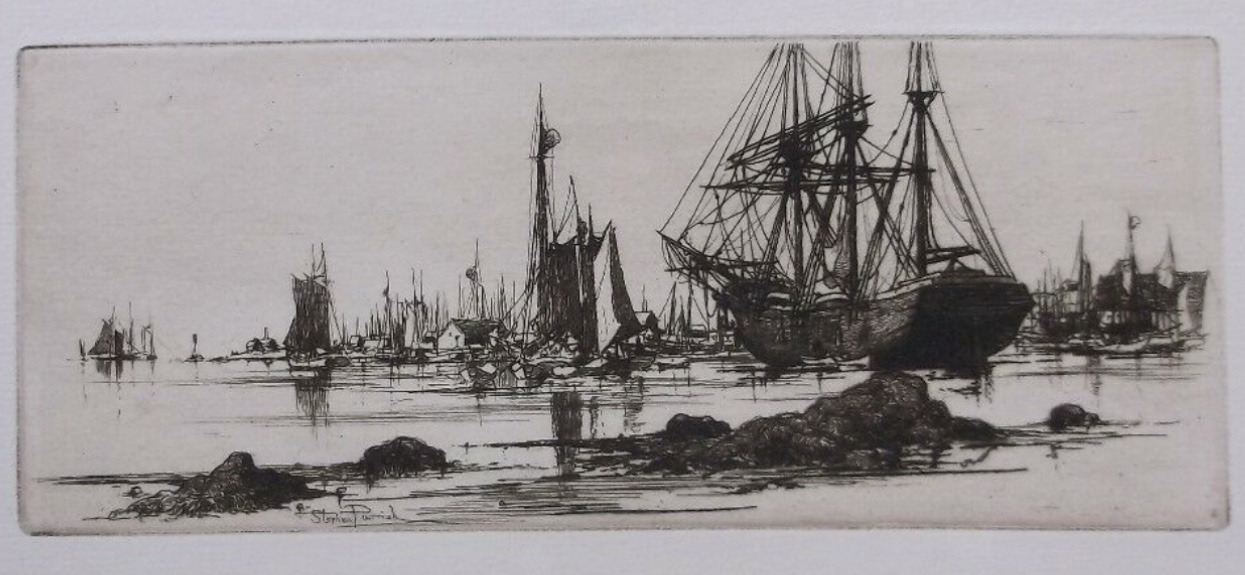
In Port, 1882

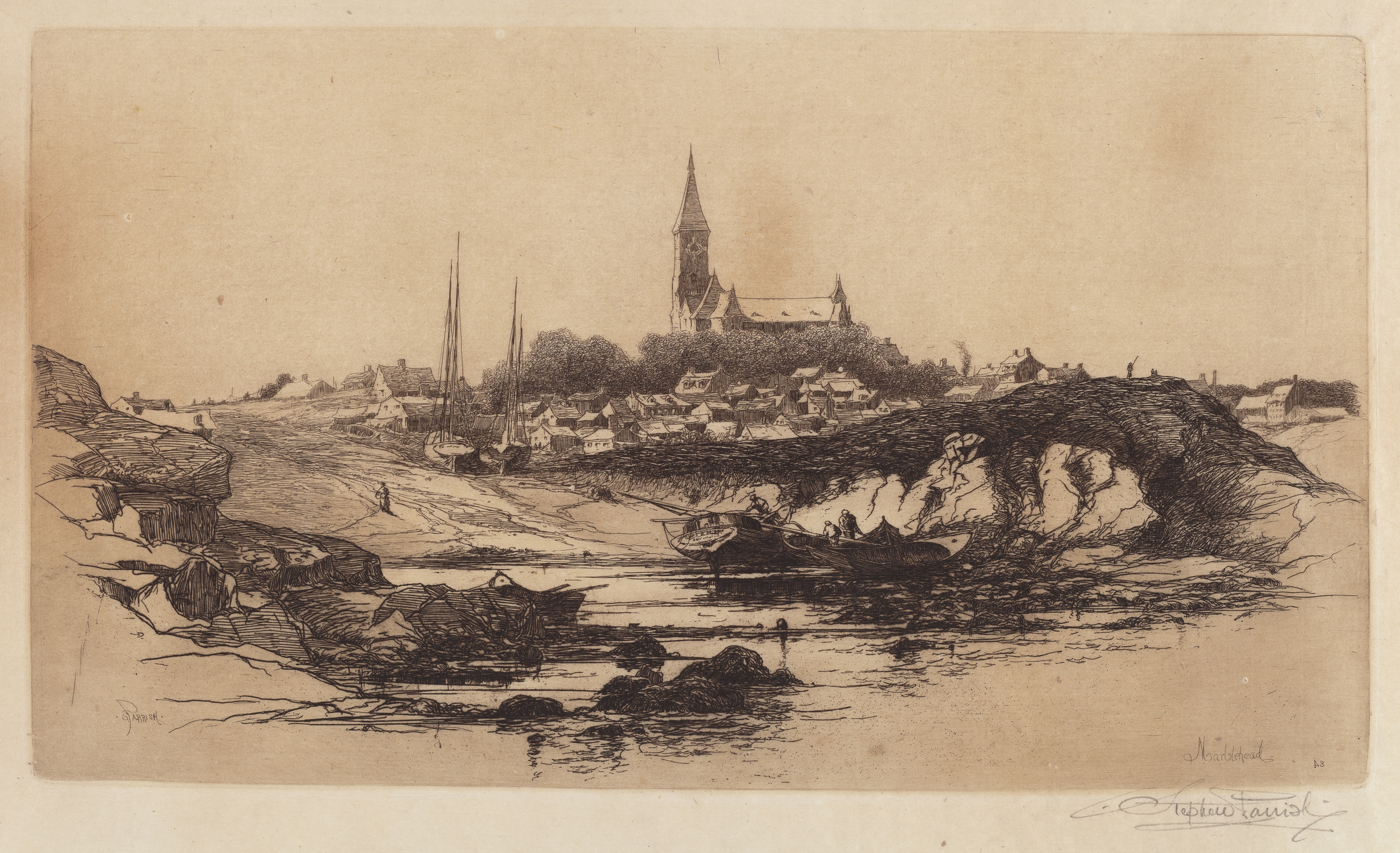
Marblehead, Massachusetts, 1881

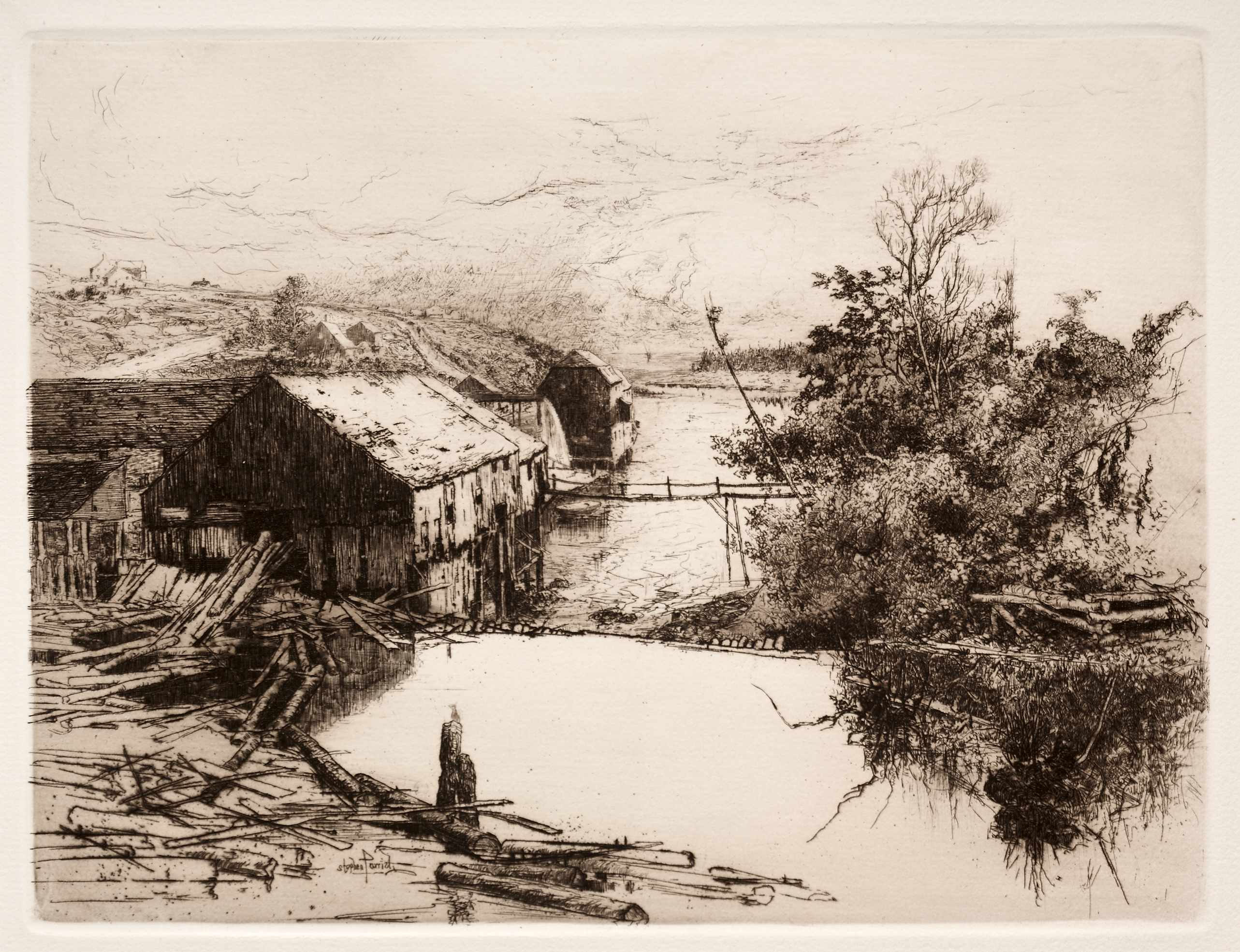
Mills at Mispek, N.B., 1884

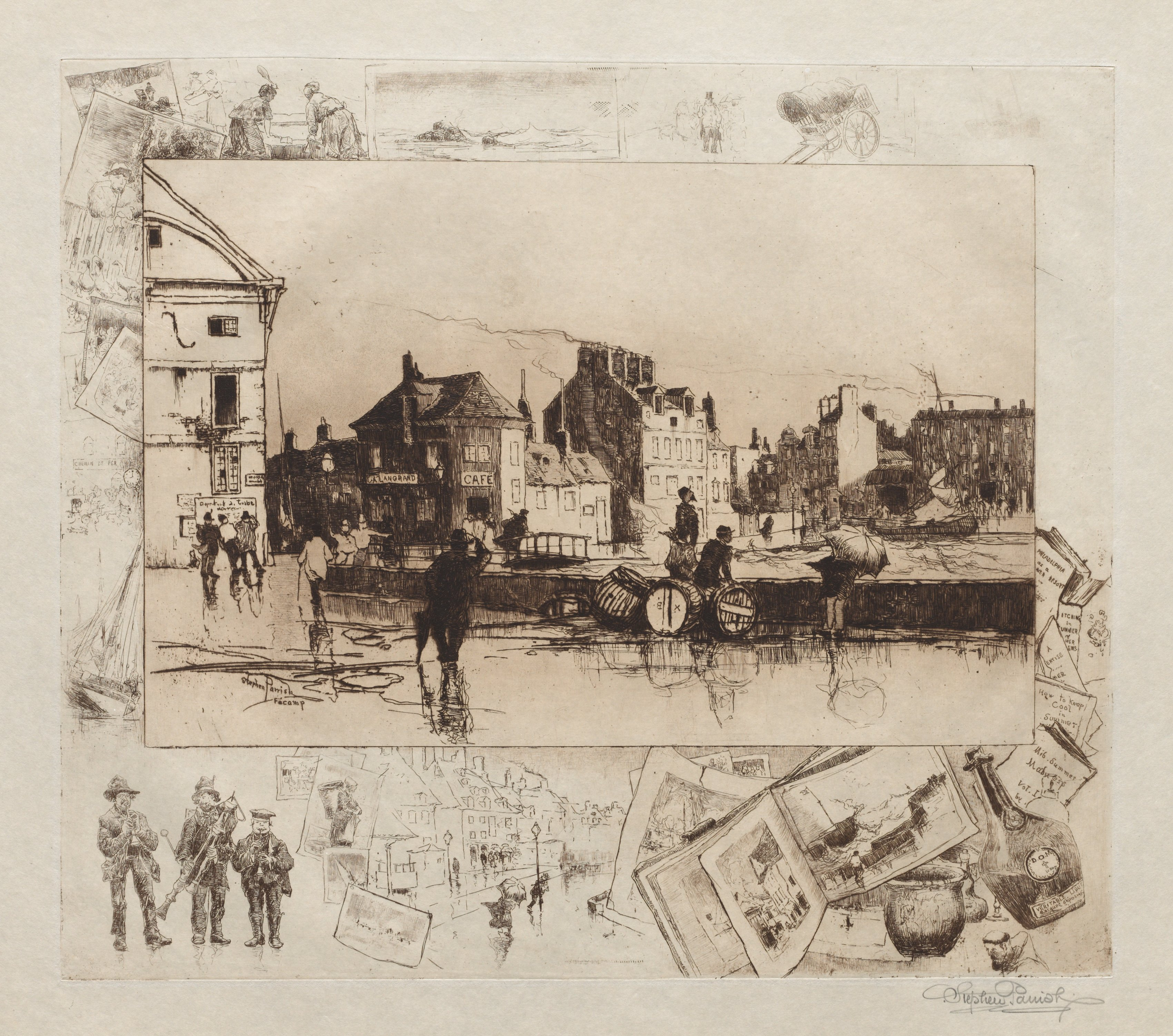
A Gale at Fécamp, Normandy, 1886

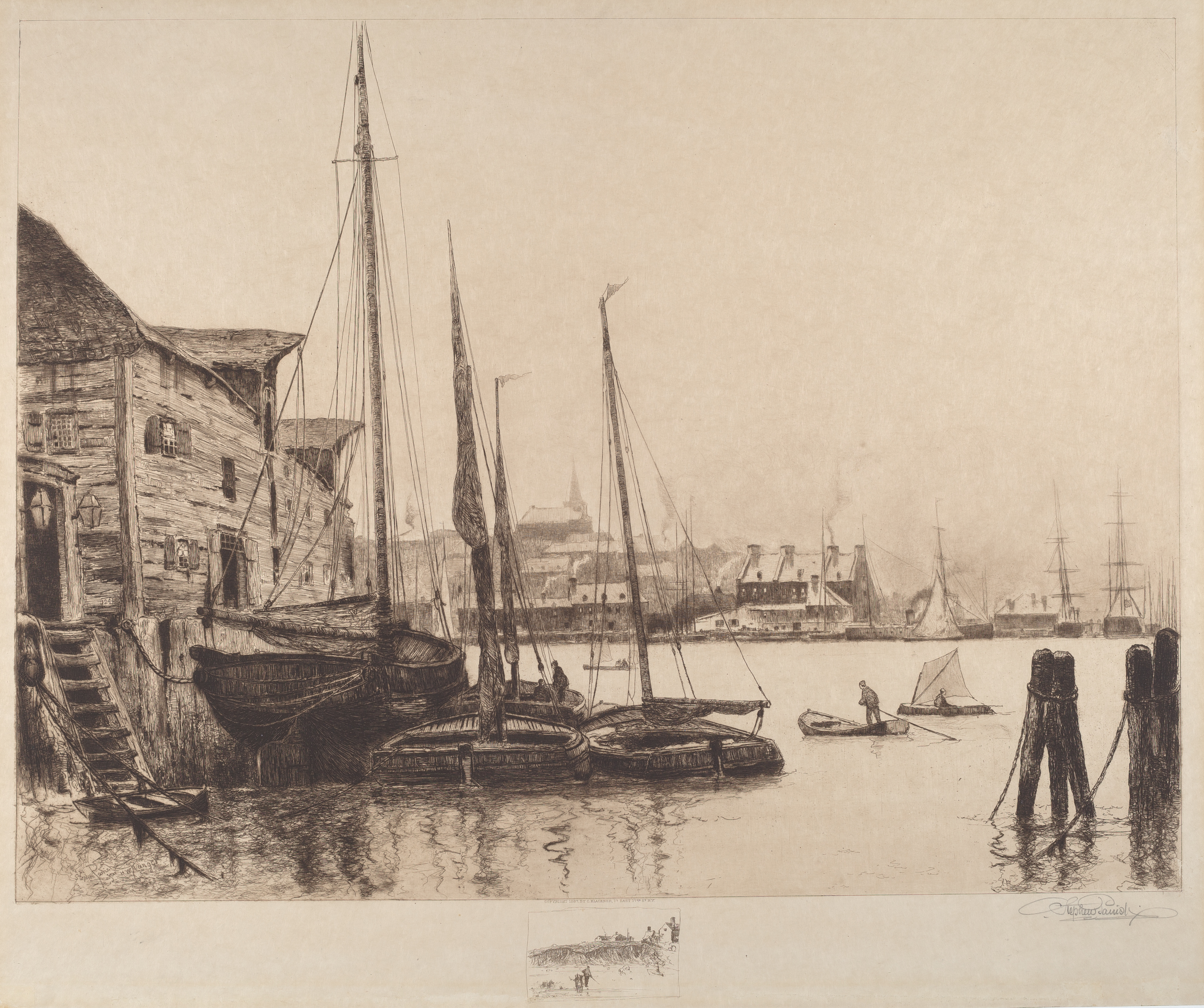
Quebec, 1887
