= Chicago Society of Etchers =

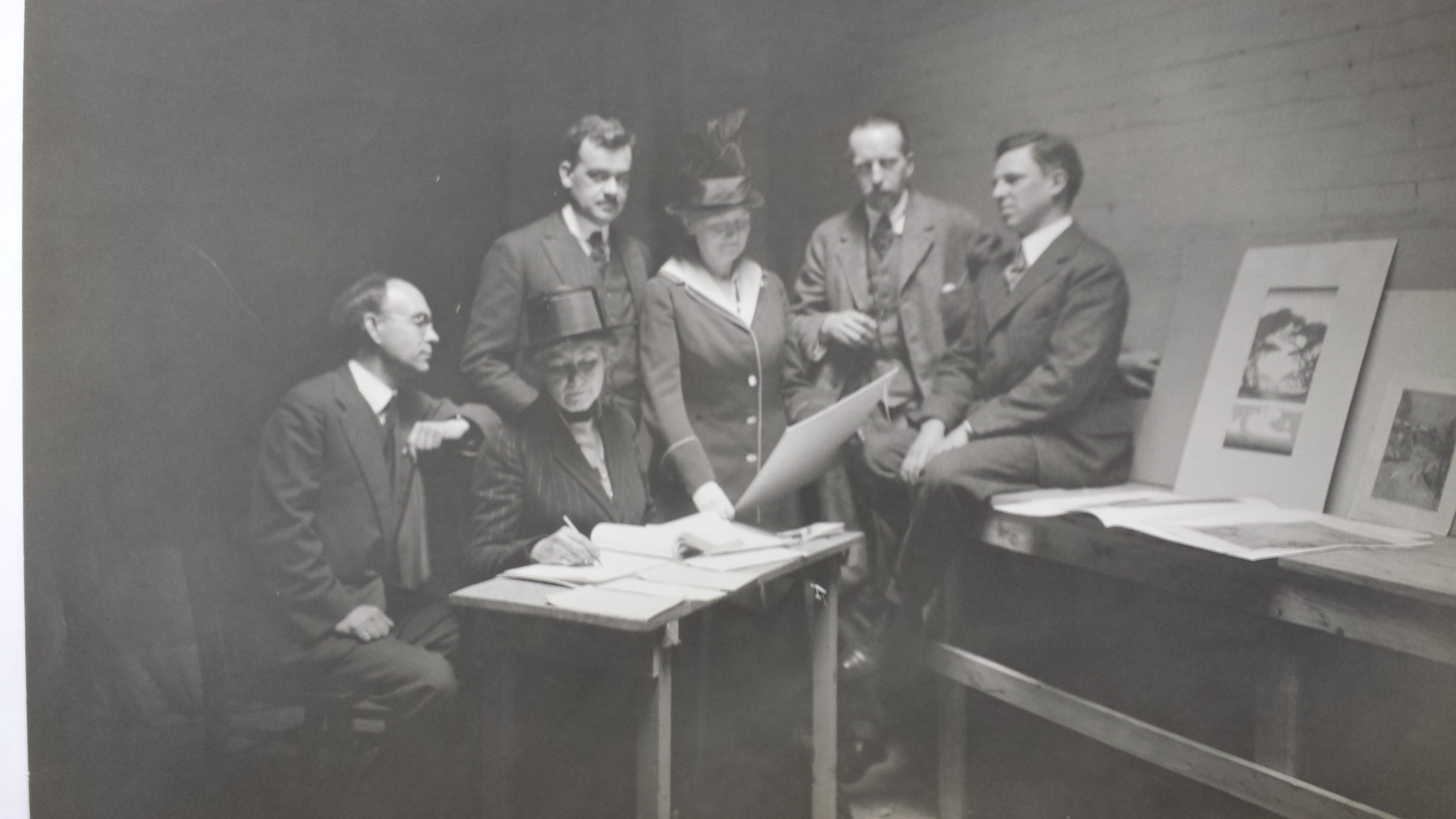
Bertha Jaques (seated) on a jury for the Chicago Society of Etchers, 1919; photograph from the archives of the Cedar Rapids Museum of Art

Chicago Society of Etchers was founded in January 1910. Although it was not the first organization of etchers in the country (preceded by groups beginning with the New York Etchers (later Etching) Club in 1877), it was certainly noteworthy. There were 20 members to start and by 1930 there were 150 members. Membership extended outside of the United States, including artists from England, France, Italy, Germany, Sweden, India, China and Japan.

== History ==
In 1909, to popularize the medium of etching, Bertha Jaques and other etchers in Chicago formed the Needle Club, an informal collective of etchers passionate about reintroducing the American public to the art of etching. In 1910 it became the Chicago Society of Etchers. The organization was primarily responsible for showing members’ etchings at the Art Institute of Chicago. It attracted international members and was successful at popularizing etching in 20th-century America. Society members pooled funds for annual prizes for new prints, to be gifted to the Art Institute, and tithed ten percent of their dues to the museum for new print acquisitions. The group disbanded in 1956.

== Members ==
- Benjamin Brown
- Cleo Damianakes
- Mukul Dey
- Frances Farrand Dodge
- Norah Hamilton
- Bertha Jaques, founding member
- Troy Kinney
- Pedro Joseph de Lemos, affiliate member
- Beatrice S. Levy
- Louis Conrad Rosenberg
- Wallace Leroy DeWolf
- Bror Julius Olsson Nordfeldt

== See also ==
- American print clubs
