= Kisory Roy =

Indian artist (1911–1965)

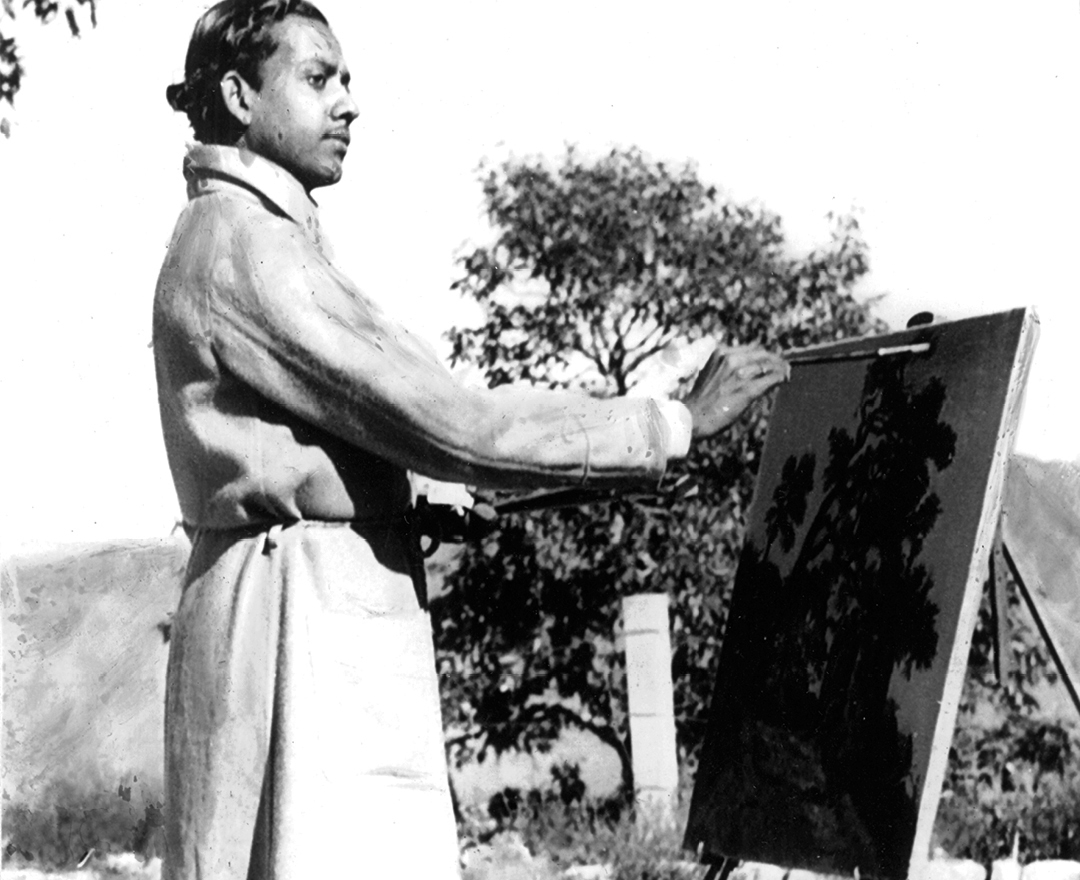
- Born: 1 May 1911; Howrah, Bengal Presidency, British India
- Died: 17 December 1965 (aged 54); Kolkata, West Bengal, India
- Education: Government School of Art, Calcutta
- Known for: Painting

Kisory Roy (1 May 1911 – 17 December 1965) was an Indian painter and artist, known for depicting the landscapes and vistas of the Indian countryside along with portrait paintings.

== Early life ==
Born in 1911 in British India, Roy was inspired to take up the arts by his father, who was an occasional painter himself. Winning a school competition led him to the Government School of Art, Calcutta, where he studied fine art from 1931 to 1937. Under Mukul Dey, he learnt to work in several mediums like watercolour, oil, crayon, and charcoal. In 1939, he learnt landscape painting under J. P. Gangooly and was considered one of his last great students. Though he made works in other genres as well, it was his landscapes that lent him an enduring legacy.

== Career ==
Roy started his career as an art teacher at the Uttarpara Government High School in Hooghly, and later joined his alma mater Government School of Art, Calcutta in 1950, where he taught for the next fifteen years.

== Notable works ==
Roy’s oil paintings of natural vistas, such as Darjeeling by Night, Smoking Copper Refinery, They Live on Leaves, Kumaun Landscape, among other works, stand out for their treatment of light and shadow and are a great balance between Bengal School and academic mannerisms. One of his most well-known paintings is that of the Howrah Bridge by night.

Roy also painted murals for the Ramgarh Palace, in present-day Jharkhand and Chitra Cinema Hall, Kolkata. His portraits of contemporary luminaries such as Sir N. N. Sarkar, Pramathesh Barua, Lalit Mohan Sen, his teacher J. P. Gangooly, novelist Sarat Chandra Chattopadhyay, and others and self-portraits including the famous Art and Famine are well known. He exhibited widely in Calcutta, Delhi and Bombay.

Kisory Roy died in 1965 at Kolkata at the age of 54.

== Students ==
Some of his notable students were Ganesh Pyne, Jogen Chowdhury, Sunil Das, Ganesh Haloi, Shakti Burman and Anju Chaudhuri.
