= Sanat Kar =

Indian Bengali painter and printmaker (1935–2023)

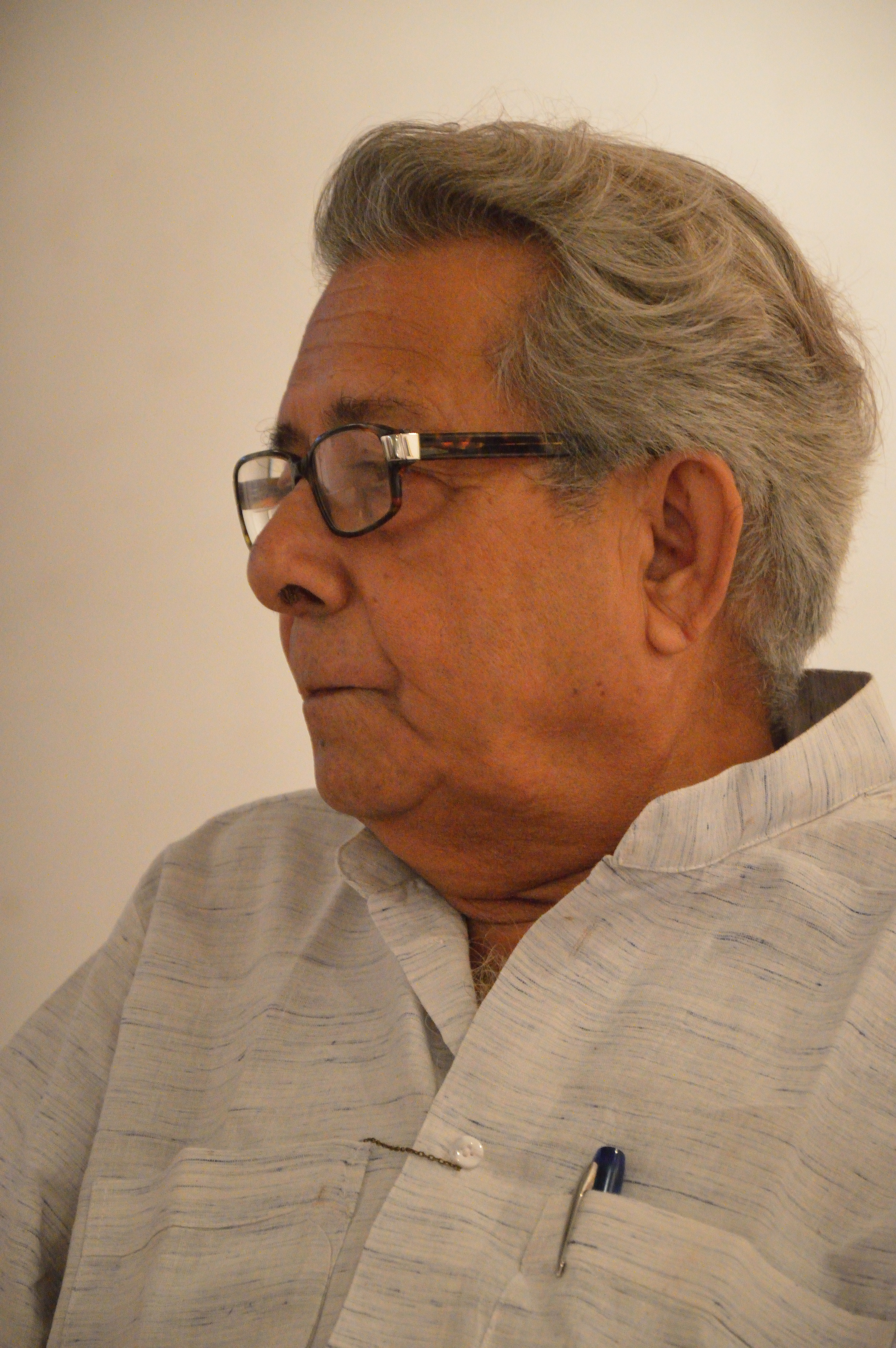
- Sanat Kar in Kolkata in 2012
- Born: 29 July 1935; Nagerbazar, Dumdum, Calcutta, British India (present day West Bengal, India)
- Died: 9 January 2023 (aged 87); Shantiniketan, West Bengal, India
- Education: Government College of Art and Craft, Calcutta
- Known for: Painting and printmaking
- Spouse: Sarbani Kar (née Ghosh) (wife)
- Children: Sayan Kar (son)

Sanat Kar (Bengali: সনৎ কর) (29 July 1935 – 9 January 2023) was a prominent Indian painter and printmaker. He is one of the pioneers of modern Indian printmaking and is known for his experiments with wood intaglio.

== Biography ==
=== Early life and education ===
Sanat Kar was born on July 29, 1935, in Nagerbazar, Dumdum, Calcutta. Sanat Kar was the eldest child of Gouri Rani and Sudhir Kumar Kar, who lived in Nagerbazar in Dumdum, Calcutta. His family ran the well known Dumdum Nursery. He studied at the neighbouring Christ Church school for a few years, after which he was enrolled in Bhowanipore's Chakraberia School, where he passed his Matriculation in 1950.

=== Calcutta (1950-1974) ===
Kar studied at the Government College of Art and Craft, Calcutta, from 1950 to 1955, during which he formed a group named Artists' Circle with his friends Arun Bose, Prakash Karmakar and others. There was also Chitrangshu, a group formed by his college seniors Nikhil Biswas and Shyamal Dutta Ray. After his studies at GCAC, he went on to teach art in schools, which was a popular choice for many art-school graduates. He had been visiting Shantiniketan, where his uncle Rammohan Dutta was employed in the Garden Department at Uttarayana in Visva-Bharati, ever since he was in college. He would also visit Kala Bhavana during this period. On one such visit, after graduating, he was introduced to the principal of Mandar Vidyapeeth in Bihar. He was offered a job there, which he accepted. He quit his job after three months and returned to Calcutta.

Unemployed, he began hunting for work again. He landed a job in two successive Hindi-medium schools, Digambar Jain and Shree Jain Vidyalaya in Calcutta. However, his stint at these schools was short-lived. His friends, artists Somnath and Reba Hore informed him of a job opening in Calcutta Boys' School (CBS). After an interview in 1959 with Clifford Hicks, then the principal of the institution, Kar got a job there as an art teacher. He would spend the next fifteen years of his life at CBS.

By the time he joined CBS, the Artists' Circle and Chitrangshu were about to become a unified entity. Sanat Kar was involved in the 1959 Banga Sanskriti Sammelan which was curated by the artist and art-critic Ahibhushan Malik, as well as the subsequent 1960 Calcutta Art Fair. That year, Malik convinced the artists to work together, which led to the formation of the Society of Contemporary Artists (SCA). Kar and Pranabranjan Ray were the founder secretaries of the SCA.

Sanat Kar began developing his printmaking abilities in the 1960s. Aided by some grants from Lalit Kala Akademi, the SCA members began experimenting with printmaking. In 1962, Kar had his first solo show at the Prints Art Gallery, where he presented his oil paintings. Years later, he would exhibit in Delhi as his first exhibition outside Calcutta at Triveni Kala Sangam in 1969, showing only his prints.

=== Kala Bhavana (1974-1995) ===
Towards the early seventies, Kar had begun looking for a job that would sustain his printmaking experiments. After an unsuccessful attempt, he joined the Department of Graphic Art of Kala Bhavana, Visva-Bharati as a reader, in 1974. In Shantiniketan, he continued experimenting with wood intaglio, which was a method developed by him in Calcutta. Wood intaglio is a method, based on the original intaglio technique that allows one to take multicolour prints from wooden blocks or plates. Wooden blocks were quite expensive and hard to come by, so he substituted them with plywood, and later sun-mica as well as cardboard treated with glue. He is a pioneer in these methods of printmaking. Soon enough, he became Head of the department, and later, he would serve as the Principal of Kala Bhavana.

During his tenure, in the 1980s, he worked with Supriyo Tagore on a project with the students of Patha Bhavana, where one group of children would draw pictures, and another would write poems or stories based on their friends' drawings. The students of the Graphic Art department would then print these drawings and poems by transferring them onto litho stones. The subsequently printed pages would be bound and put together as books. This became a tradition, which is still followed every year around Nandan Mela, although the books have been replaced by calendars. Later,

Kar produced some of his finest works in Shantiniketan in the 1970s and 1980s. His work from this period covers various mediums such as etching (zinc plate), wood intaglio, sunmica and cardboard engraving. He also made a large number paintings in tempera, which would be classified as series titled "Ikebana", "Leaves", "Maya", "Dreamers" and "Homage to Kalighat Pats".

He retired in 1995. He was later honoured as Professor Emeritus by Visva-Bharati.

=== Later Years and Death (1995-2023) ===
Kar continued working after his retirement from teaching. His preferred mediums were ink, tempera and pastel on paper, although he would occasionally return to printmaking. He remained an active member of the SCA throughout his life. Towards his final years, he provided encouragement and advice to Debovasha, who organised several exhibitions of his works, and also published his writings and sketchbooks.

Kar died on January 9, 2023, at his residence in Ratan Pally, Shantiniketan.

== Personal life ==
In 1961, Kar married the artist Sarbani Ghosh, the youngest sister of Karuna Shaha. Their son, Sayan, was born in 1965.

== Major publications ==
- Sanat Kar. স্মৃতির আঁকিবুকি (Smritir Ankibuki). Ananda Publishers. 2017. ISBN 978-93-5040-483-6
- Sanat Kar. গল্প নয় গপ্পো (Galpo Noy Gappo). Debovasha. 2019.

== Awards ==
- 1973: All India Arts and Crafts Society (AIFACS) award
- 1993: Pashchimbanga Rajya Charukala Parishad award and the West Bengal state Lalit Kala Akademi award
- 1996: the Shiromoni Puraskar
- 1997: the Kala Vibhushan, AIFACS
- 2005: the Gagan-Abani Purashkar from Visva Bharati
- 2014: the Abanindra Purashkar from the West Bengal Government
- 2015: the Shilpi Maha Samman from the West Bengal Government
- 2017: the Zainul Abedin Purashkar from Bangladesh
- 2022: Lifetime Achievement Award from Birla Academy of Art and Culture

== Notable exhibitions ==
- Paintings and Prints, Art Heritage, New Delhi, 1984
- Paintings and Prints, Pundole Art Gallery, Mumbai, 1989
- Bronzes and Prints, Birla Academy of Art and Culture, Kolkata, 2002–03
- The Lyrical Mudra at Akar Prakar, Kolkata, 2006
- Homage to Kalighat Pats at Gallery Sanskriti, Kolkata, 2007
- Sanat Kar: A retrospective at CIMA, Kolkata, 2019
- Prints and Prints at Debovasha, Kolkata 2022
