= Ganesh Pyne =

Indian painter (1937–2013)

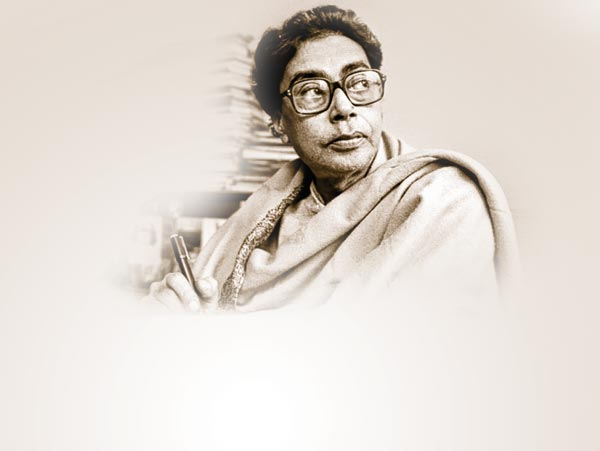
- Born: 11 June 1937; Kolkata, West Bengal, India
- Died: 12 March 2013 (aged 75); Kolkata, West Bengal, India
- Education: Government College of Art & Craft
- Known for: Painting, drawing
- Movement: Indian modern art

Ganesh Pyne (Bengali: গণেশ পাইন) (11 June 1937 – 12 March 2013) was an Indian painter and draughtsman, born in Kolkata, West Bengal. Pyne is one of the most notable contemporary artists of the Bengal School of Art, who had also developed his own style of "poetic surrealism", fantasy and dark imagery, around the themes of Bengali folklore and mythology.

== Early life and education ==
Born and brought up in Kolkata, living in a crumbling family mansion in Kabiraj Row, north Calcutta (now Kolkata), Pyne grew up listening to his grandmother's folktales and reading fantastic stories from children's books, which was to create the vocabulary of his future art. Also during his childhood years, he flipped through, Mouchak, a Bengali children's magazine, to which his family subscribed, he came across a printed drawing by, Abanindranath, the founder of the Bengal school art movement. This had deep impact on him, and he started reading avidly and drawing on his black slate with chalk for hours.

However, much greater impact was to come in 1946, first his father died early in the year, and his family was caught up in the Calcutta riots, which preceded the partition of India, and they had to be escorted to a safe zone at the Calcutta Medical College. This trauma at age 9, had a lasting impact on his life and work. He studied at Government College of Art & Craft, an educational institution closely associated with Bengal School of Art, and graduated in 1959.

== Career ==
Pyne commenced his artistic career in the early 1950, as a book illustrator and doing sketching for animation films at Mandar Mullick's studio in Kolkata. During this period, not having enough money to buy colours, he made small drawings in pen and ink; and in 1963 joined the Society for Contemporary Artists, which had local artists like Bikash Bhattacharjee, Shyamal Datta Ray, Dharmanarayan Dasgupta and Ganesh Haloi.

His early work was deeply influenced by the Bengal school and especially Abanindranath Tagore was in water colour, and his first painting "Winter's Morning", portrayed him going to school along with his brother. Further he added the influences of Frans Hals, Rembrandt's handling of chiaroscuro and Paul Klee's simplicity and cubism in developing his own style of "poetic surrealism", around themes from Bengali folklore and mythology. His artistic breakthrough was preceded by his years as an animator in Kolkata and exposure to Walt Disney's cartoons. Being a cinema buff, he also took inspiration from European black-and-white cinema masters, Bergman, Wajda and Fellini.

"Artists of our generation painted for the love of art.
I feel one should have an unwavering affair with ones creativity.
Otherwise, you are swept away by the tide"

— Ganesh Pyne

The 1970s were the painter's important period, he had moved to water colours, in a tumultuous period of anger and despair in Bengal that found expression in his art. During this period, a Mumbai magazine, The Illustrated Weekly of India published an article where a leading contemporary artist, M.F. Hussain, when asked to rank who the best painter in India was, named 37-year-old Pyne, considering it was a period, when Francis Souza, Tyeb Mehta and Syed Raza were leading painters, this episode immediately brought him into the limelight. Through the '60s and '70s, a painter who became famously reclusive in his later years, remained active in daily adda culture of Kolkata. He participated in Paris Biennale in 1969 and contemporary Indian Painting in West Germany in 1970. However, by the time, the India art boom arrived in the 1980s, he started largely keeping to himself, fazed by the commercialism.

He was the only significant artist of his generation who side stepped the progressives of the forties and reconnected with the Bengal School and managed to benefit from that contact, forging a personal modernist idiom rather than slipping into non-productive traditionalism.

— R. Siva Kumar, The Sunday Guardian.

In a career spanning decades, his abstract and surrealist paintings starting with watercolours and later in gouache and tempera, were exhibited in group exhibitions across India and in Paris, London, Washington and Germany. Though, he was never prolific, continued to shun both limelight and art collectors alike, and never held any major exhibition, preferring to show his paintings three at a time, as Society of Contemporary Artists, Kolkata to which he belonged. In fact, his first solo exhibition was only held after he was 50 at The Village Gallery in Delhi, and Centre of International Modern Art, Kolkata organised the first major exhibition of his work as late as in 1998. Yet, through the 1980s to the '90s, his work fetched one of the highest priced amongst an Indian artists, and he had already established himself amongst leading painters of Bengal school, like Bikash Bhattacharjee, Jogen Chowdhury and Somnath Hore and influenced a generation of painters. In his later years, Pyne undertook a series of works that drew from the Mahabharata but focused on the peripheral characters of that epic such as Ekalavya and Amba and these were exhibited in Kolkata in 2010.

Pyne died on 12 March 2013 at a Kolkata hospital where he was admitted following a heart attack, at the age of 75. He is survived by his wife and son.

== Artistic approach ==
Pyne started as a water-colourist in the Bengal school mode, and gradually shifted to gouache and finally to tempera, for his subsequent abstract and surrealist work period, in ochre, black and blue shades. According to painter Bhupen Khakhar, "his personal encounters/interactions with violence at a tender age formed his dark background.., while his language was formed while doing animation." He was also known as "painter of darkness", for using dark colours like black and blue and motifs suggesting death, and death, pain and solitude remained consistent themes in his work. The art critic Ranjit Hoskote termed him "a poet of melancholia", who "explored elements of the subconscious; the mercenary, the demons and the angels were aspects of the self split from his waking reality" while Pritish Nandy described his paintings as having "a meticulous narrative quality[...]that is taken from the dark innards of his imagination". The celebrated painter MF Hussain once told the Illustrated Weekly of India that Pyne was India's best artist.

== Awards and recognition ==
Pyne was given Raja Ravi Varma award by the Government of Kerala, and in 2011, the lifetime achievement award by the Indian Chamber of Commerce.

A 1998 documentary film on him, A Painter of Eloquent Silence: Ganesh Pyne directed by Buddhadeb Dasgupta was awarded the National Film Award for the Best Arts Film.

== Exhibitions and shows ==
- 'World Youth Festival', Prague-1968
- Indian International Triennial, New Delhi-1968 & 71
- Paris Biennial, Paris-1970
- Exhibition in aid of Menuhin School of Music, Royal Academy of Arts, London-1970
- International Festival of Art, Cagnes-sur-Mer-1975
- 'Modern Indian Painting', Hirschhorn Museum, Washington DC-1982
- 'Contemporary Indian Art', Festival of India, Royal Academy of Arts, London-1982
- 'Indische Kunst Heute', Darmdstadt, Germany-1982 & 86
- 'Trends and Images', CIMA Gallery, Calcutta-1993
- 'Chamatkar – Myth and Magic in Indian Art', curated by CIMA Gallery, Whiteleys Art Gallery, London-1996
- 'Tryst with Destiny – Art from Modern India', Singapore Art Museum, Singapore-1997
- 'Image beyond Image' travelling exhibition of Indian paintings from the Glenbarra Art Museum, Himeji, Japan to New Delhi, Calcutta, Bangalore and Bombay-1997.
- 'Germinal', solo show of jottings, curated by Arun Ghose at India Art Fair 2014, New Delhi by Sanchit Art-2014.
- Memorialising Ganesh Pyne: Photographs & Photo Collages by Veena Bhargava at Akar Prakar Kolkata, 2020. Curatorial Advisor - Ella Dutta
- Ganesh Pyne: From the Shadows at Akar Prakar, Delhi 2022. Curated by Siddhi Shailendra

== Books on Pyne ==
- Ganesh Pyne's Twilight Dreams by Vaishali Shroff. Publisher: Art1st (April 2024)
- Thirst of a Minstrel: The Life and Times of Ganesh Pyne by Shiladitya Sarkar. Publisher: Rupa & Co. (November 2004)
- Ganesh Pyne: A Pilgrim in the Dominion of Shadows by Ranjit Hoskote. Publisher: Galerie 88, Kolkata (2005)
- Enchanted Space: The Private World of Ganesh Pyne by Sovon Som. Publisher: CIMA (2006)
- Ganesh Pyne, his life and times by Ella Datta. Publisher: Centre for International Modern Art (1998)
- Ghose, Arun (30 January 2014). Jottings as Paintings of Ganesh Pyne. New Delhi: Sanchit Art Publications. ISBN 978-81-926373-1-0.
- Memorialising Ganesh Pyne: Photographs & Photo Collages by Veena Bhargava. Essay by Ella Dutta. Publisher: Akar Prakar and Mapin Publishing (2020).
- Ganesh Pyne: A Painter of Eloquent Silence by Pranabranjan Ray. Publisher: Lalit Kala Akademi and Akar Prakar (2018)
