= Haren Das =

Indian artist

- Born: Harendra Narayan Das; 1 February 1921; Dinajpur, Bengal Presidency, British India (now in Bangladesh)
- Died: 31 January 1993 (aged 71); Calcutta, India

Harendra Narayan Das (1 February 1921 – 31 January 1993), better known as Haren Das, was a highly respected artist in India who worked almost exclusively in printmaking mediums. His work included engravings, linocuts, etchings, and lithographs, though he is most remembered for the technical skill of his woodcuts and wood engravings.

Haren Das followed a tradition of wood engraving that developed in the bazaars of north Calcutta in the mid-19th century. His early academic training was received partially from Ramendranath Chakravorty (1902–55), who had been influenced in color woodcut printing by the Japanese style of Ukiyo-e prints. Throughout his life Das perfected his woodcut and wood engraving techniques, sometimes producing multi-colored prints of enormous technical proficiency. Though Das created numerous etchings, aquatints, dry points and linocuts, he seldom ventured outside the realm of printmaking. Working during a time when fine art was equated with painting and sculpture, Haren Das was often criticized for working in what was then considered little more than a commercially oriented craft.

Throughout his career Das remained committed to British academic and Victorian ideals that included concepts of perfection and traditionally perceived beauty. Unlike artists such as Somnath Hore, who reacted with brutal directness to the horrors of the 1943 Bengal Famine, Haren Das remained focused upon his vision of a rural ideal. However, his bucolic images paid continuous homage to the hardworking people of Bangladesh and India's farms and villages.

In 1947 Das became a teacher at the Government School of Art in Calcutta, and in 1951 he became a lecturer at the Government College of Art & Craft in the same city. His printmaking work has been exhibited and recognized in Bangladesh, India, Japan, Germany, Switzerland, Poland, Argentina and Chile.
