= Asian Paints Sharad Shamman =

Indian Award

- Asian Paints Sharad Shamman
- Awarded for: Excellence in artistic achievements
- Country: Kolkata, West Bengal, India
- Presented by: Asian Paints
- First award: October, 1985
- Website: www.asianpaints.com

Asian Paints Sharad Shamman (Bengali: এশিয়ান পেইন্টস শারদ সম্মান) is an excellence award given to the best decorated Durga Puja Pandal in Kolkata during the festival in October. Since its inception in 1985, Asian Paints Sharad Shamman has been heralded as the true achievement for excellence in decorating the abodes for Goddess Durga. As time has progressed there have been numerous awards being given by many other companies for creative excellence, but still Asian Paints Sharad Shamman is considered the most important award and the rightful judgement for excellence. It is a trendsetter for all the later awards.

== About the Award ==
"Asian Paints Sharad Shamman" was started in 1985 as a means for awarding the best decorated puja pandal during Durga Puja in Kolkata. Sharad means "Autumn (as the festival takes place at that season)" and Shamman means "Award/Respect", and was sponsored by Asian Paints, hence the name Asian Paints Sharad Shamman. Out of about 3000 puja pandals in Kolkata, few get shortlisted and among them six are given the awards.

== Award Categories ==
Total six awards are given to six puja pandals. When Sharad Shamman started in 1985 only three awards were given to three Best Puja pandals. From 1994 a special award called "Discovery of the Year" was introduced to honour a completely unknown pandal for its excellence. This four categories were continued for the next six years. But in 2000 Asian Paints felt the awards were too similar, there was no demarcation to identify Best Decoration of the pandal or the Best looking Idol. Hence in 2000 two new categories were introduced - "Creative Excellence (Nobbo Nakshi)", which focussed on the Best decorated Pandal, and "Best Artisan", given to the artist of the Best looking Idol. In 2010, the "Creative Excellence" was renamed to "Innovative Excellence" and it was continued for five years. Although in 2015, the Asian Paints committee didn't pick any puja for "Innovative Excellence" but the number of awards remained unaltered by introducing one more puja in "Discovery of the year" category. Keeping in mind the large growth and globalization in Kolkata Durga Puja, Asian Paints committee introduced another special award namely "Special Jury Award" on overall excellence. At present these seven categories (three for Best Pujas, two for Discovery of the year, one for Best Artisan and one for Special Award) represent Asian Paints Sharad Shamman. Some of the parameters for awarding the pandals include the overall beauty and grandeur of a pandal based on a chosen theme, the beauty of the Durga protima, how well the sanctum of the protima has been shown, and the finesse in the work done on the pandal. In 2020, due to nationwide COVID-19 pandemic, the Asian Paints Sharad Shamman judges didn't make a physical appearance on the participating pandels, the whole process had been successfully organised online by the APSS committee.

=== Best Puja (Shrestho Pujo) ===
years active (1985–present)

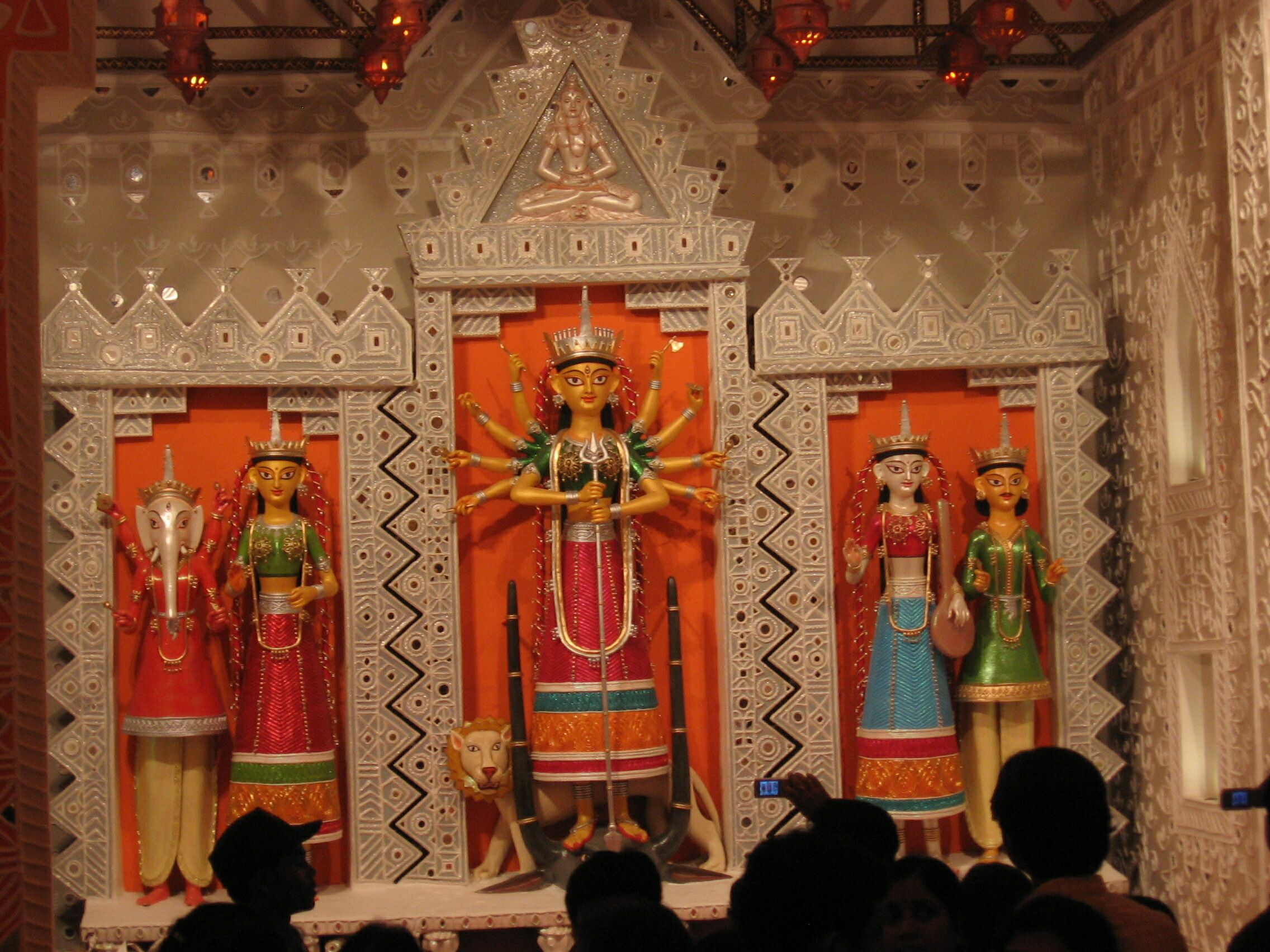
New Alipore Suruchi Sangha which won Best Puja in 2003 and Creative Excellence in 2007

This award was the first award given when APSS started in 1985. Three puja pandals are selected based on everything, i.e., Decorative excellence, best looking idol, ambiance, lighting etc. No demarcations are there like winner, first runner-up: instead all three pujas are considered to be the Best Puja. Normally winners in these category used to be the well-known Pujas, but nowadays many unknown Pujas have cropped up with the technical excellence to bag this award. At present, Durga Pujas in Kolkata are more theme oriented. Some specific theme like Madhubani art or earthen cups or a place like Kerala, will be the base for the decoration. In 2001, "Bosepukur Sitalamandir" decorated its pandal completely of earthen cups and was so popular that it won the Best Puja award hands down. There have been many Pujas which has won this award many times. "Suruchi Sangha" leads the list with twelve wins. A puja, once been declared a winner in this list cannot be declared in the "Discovery of the Year" award though it can win "Creative Excellence" or "Best Artisan" award.

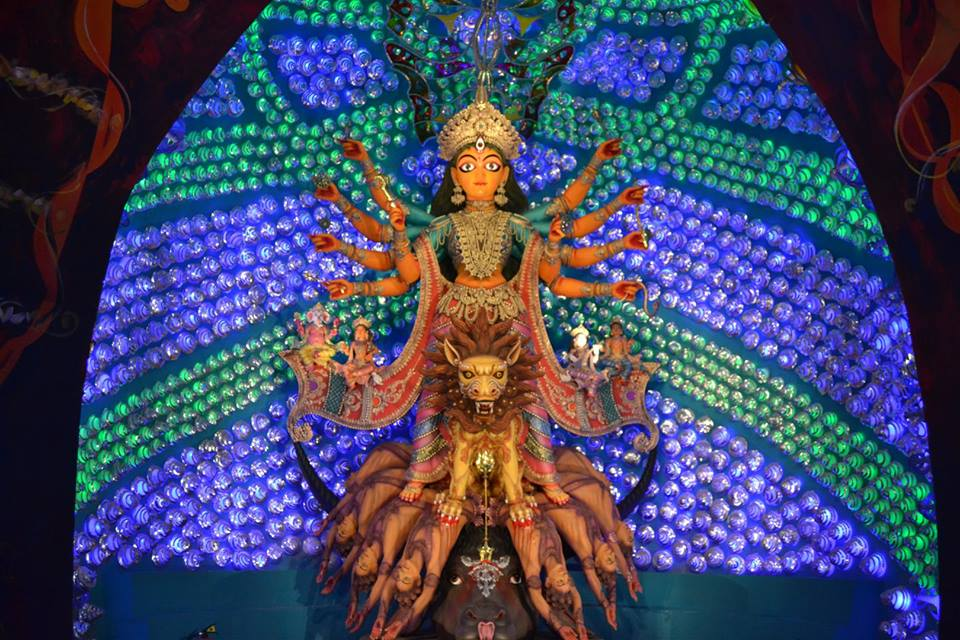
In 2015, the theme ‘Hydridosuramardini’ at Tala Barowari, crafted by Subrata Banerjee and Avijit Pal, was honored with the title of Best Artisan of the Year.

Among the asian paints sharad samman winners (see the above list "Most wins") "Laketown Natunpally Pradeep Sangha" is the first puja committee who had win the prestigious durga puja award (Best Puja or, Shrestho Pujo) for consecutive three years (2006, 2007 and 2008) for the first time in North Kolkata and for the second time in Kolkata after Adi Ballygunge. In 2019, another puja from North Kolkata namely "Talapark Pratyay" also achieved this unique record after "Natunpally Pradeep Sangha". Till date "Suruchi Sangha", "Naktala Udayan Sangha" and "Behala Natun Dal" had also achieved the award for three consecutive years.

=== Discovery of the Year (Bochorer Bismoy) ===
years active (1994–present)
Discovery of the Year was first introduced in 1994 as a means to introduce a previously unknown and undiscovered Puja Pandal. Many unknown Pujas have cropped up on this list which are extremely popular in Kolkata. Notable among them are Barisha Sahajatri, Karbagan, Shivmandir Sarbojanin etc. Laketown Netaji Sporting Club modeled their pandal totally on a village situated on a hill and won this award in 2003. It has also happened many times that a Puja Pandal has already been popular in Kolkata in the previous year, but wins the "Discovery" award next year. In that case logically that is not a "Discovery of the Year". A Puja, once winning this title, can't win it again. Rammohan Sammilani won the discovery of the year in 1994.

=== Creative Excellence (Nobbo Nakshi) ===
years active (2000–present)
Started in 2000, Creative Excellence or Nobbo Nakshi in Bengali, is given as a means to felicitate the pandal with the best decoration. Pandals which has won the "Best Puja" and the "Discovery of the Year" can also win this award. "Darpanarayan Tagore Street" decorated their pandal entirely out of cowdung, which won them the first "Creative Excellence" award in 2001. Puja clubs can win this award anytime irrespective of whether they are a previously unknown puja or a famous one. Judges look for the intricacies and the details woven into creating the concept truly, and depicting them with technical brilliance.

=== Best Artisan (Shrestho Protimashilpi) ===
years active (2000–present)
Introduced in 2000, Best Artisan award is given to the maker of the Best Idol. Judges look for beauty, peace, strength, prowess in the idol and how good the idol can blend with the theme for the puja. Notable among the winners are Sanatan Dinda who has won 3 Best Artisan award, one for "Hatibagan Sarbojanin" in 2000 and two for "Nalin Sarkar Street" in 2004 and 2006, Shri Pradip Rudra Paul who won 2 awards for "Behala Adarshapally", Shri Purnendu Dey who won two awards, one for "Chakraberia Sarbojanin" in 2007 and for "Barisha Club" in 2008, Shri Subrata Banerjee who won two awards for "Tala Barowari" in 2015 and 2016 and Mr. Bhabotosh Sutar who won two awards for Naktala Udayan Sangha in 2011 and for Suruchi Sangha in 2019. Behala Adarshapally won both the categories of Best Puja and Best Artisan in 2005.

== The Award ==
The statuette given for Asian Paints Sharad Shamman looks like a conch shell. It is a small silver structure(previously gold) which is situated on a pedestal. This is enclosed in a glass box and handed over to the winners along with a cheque. Variations include for the statuette for "Creative Excellence" award. This includes a statue of an earthen pot with the traditional coconut and mango leaves on it. This is also made of silver.
From 2016, the design of the prestigious Asian Paints Sharad Samman statuette has been modified making it more attractive and glowing. It now looks like a lotus with a stand holding it with a pedestal which is enclosed in a glass box. The height of the statuette has been enhanced as compared to the previous one.

== Asian Paints Logo and slogan ==
For Asian Paints Sharad Shamman, a logo of a young boy playing the dhak(drum) is shown. Also among the logos are a face of Maa Durga in monochrome line drawing, little kids playing with balloons etc.

The slogan for the award is "Shuddha suchi, sustha ruchi'r sera bachai" which means "The best from the artistically efficient and culturally significant", as described by the late poet Shri Subhash Mukhopadhay. From that point this has been the main slogan for the award.

== Judges and judgement ==
The judges for the award are chosen from a who's who of the Bengali Literati and include artists, art critics, writers, actors, politicians, models, singers, poets etc. Notable among those chosen over the years are artist Shuvaprasanna, actors Sabyasachi, Moon Moon Sen, magician P.C. Sorcar, vocalist Bratati etc. Puja pandals are requested to submit their application by the 3rd day of the Puja. The judges go around the town on the fifth and sixth day and visit all the different Puja pandals. On the seventh day 12 finalists are short-listed and their names are declared. Finally, on the evening of the eighth day, the winners in the different categories are declared and are handed over with their trophies.

== List of winners ==
The following is the list of winners and their artists for Asian Paints Sharad Shamman from the past 34 years.

Year	Best Puja	Discovery of the Year	Creative Excellence	Best Artisan	Emerging New Artist	Special Award	Shortlisted Puja
1985	Jodhpur Park, Adi Ballygunge, Maddox Square	NA	NA	NA	NA		
1986	College Square, Adi Ballygunge, Bagbazar Sarbojanin	NA	NA	NA	NA		
1987	College Square, Vivekananda Sporting Club, Adi Ballugunge	NA	NA	NA	NA		
1988	Beliaghata Sarir Sangathon, Adi Ballygunge, Mudiali	NA	NA	NA	NA		
1989	Babubagan, Nabapally, Shimla Byam Samiti	NA	NA	NA	NA		
1990	Babubagan, Mudiali, Falguni Sangha	NA	NA	NA	NA		
1991	Kashi Bose Lane, Bagbazar Sarbojanin, Maddox Square	NA	NA	NA	NA		
1992	Mudiali, Yuba Brinda, Sunilnagar	NA	NA	NA	NA		
1993	Adi Ballygunge, Yuba Brinda, Kashi Bose Lane	NA	NA	NA	NA		
1994	Nabapally, Telengabagan Sarbojanin, Mudiali	Rammohan Sammilani	NA	NA	NA		
1995	Telengabagan Sarbojanin - Shri Pradip Rudra Pal, Kumartuli Park - Shri Sutanu Maity, Sunilnagar - Shri Bandan Raha	Ballygunge 21 Pally - Shri Buku Munsi	NA	NA	NA		
1996	Sovabazar Beniatola - Shri Tapas Basu, Ahiritola Sarbojanin - Shri Sutanu Maity, Rammohan Sammilani - Bharatmata Decorators (Contai), Shri Krisha Pal (Kumartuli)	Kalighat Yuva Maitri - Shri Bhramar Mitra	NA	NA	NA		
1997	Ahiritola - Shri Sutanu Maity; Chaltabagan Lohapatty - Shri Sutanu Maity, Hatibagan Sarbojanin - Shri Sukhendu Mukherjee	Karbagan - Shri Bandan Raha	NA	NA	NA		
1998	Karbagan - Shri Bholanath Kalsi, Bosepukur Sitalamandir - Shri Bandan Raha, Laketown Adhibashibrindo - Shri Bhaskar Chowdhury	Barisha Sahajatri - Deben Laha, Shruti Laha & Susanta Paul	NA	NA	NA		
1999	Sovabazar Beniatola - Shri Sanjoy Chakraborty, Sunilnagar - Shri Pradip De, Shri Sanatan Rudra Pal, Barisha Tapobon - Shri Amar Sarkar	Shivmandir Sarbojanin - Shri Sanjit Ghosh	NA	NA	NA		
2000	Behala Adarshapally - Club Members, Dum Dum Park Tarun Sangha - Shri Rupchand Kundu, Kankurgachi Nabadai Pally Mangal Samity - Shri Saumya Bandyopadhyay	Pathuriaghata 5er Pally - Shri Ashutosh Shi	Karbagan - Shri Kamal Naskar	Hatibagan Sarbojanin; Shri Sanatan Dinda	NA		
2001	Bosepukur Sitalamandir - Shri Bandan Raha, Laketown Adhibashibrindo - Shri Amal Roy, Barisha Shrishti - Shri Amar Sarkar	Kankurgachi Youngster - Shri Gopal Podder	Darpanarayan Tagore Street - Shri Prasanta Pal	Brindaban Matrimandir; Shri Upendranath Pal	NA		
2002	Darpanarayan Tagore Street - Shri Prasanta Pal, Haridevpur Ajeya Sanghati - Shri Amar Sarkar, Selimpur Pally - Shri Gopal Podder	Barisha Shakti Sangha - Shri Partha Dasgupta & Barisha Silpara Art Association	Shyamapally Shyama Sangha - Shri Samir Aich	Chaltabagan Lohapatty; Shri Nepal Pal & Shri Gouranga Pal	NA		
2003	New Alipore Suruchi Sangha - Shri Subodh Roy, Haridevpur Ajeya Sanghati - Shri Amar Sarkar, Nimtola Ghat Street Sarbojanin - Shri Kamaldeep Dhar	Laketown Netaji Sporting Club - Shri Sanjit Ghosh	Khidderpore Pally Sharadiya - Club Members	Behala Adarshapally; Shri Pradip Rudra Pal	NA		
2004	Barisha Shrishti - Shri Bhabatosh Sutar, Barisha Yubakbrindo - Shri Rabin Roy, Behala Club - Shri Amar Sarkar	Salt Lake BE Block East - Shri Nirmal Malick	Pathuriaghata 5er Pally - Shri Prasanta Pal	Nalin Sarkar Street; Shri Sanatan Dinda	NA		
2005	Behala Adarshapally - Shri Partha Dasgupta; Shivmandir Sarbojanin - Shri Purnendu De; Behala Club - Shri Amar Sarkar	Swapnar Bagan Yubobrindo - Shri Somnath Mukherjee	Naktala Udayan Sangha - Shri Susanta Paul	Behala Adarshapally; Shri Pradip Rudra Pal	NA		
2006	Haridevpur 41 Pally - Shri Bivas Mukherjee; Bosepukur Talbagan - Shri Prasanta Pal; Laketown Natunpally Pradeep Sangha - Shri Bhabatosh Sutar	Jawpur Bayam Samity - Shri Snehangshu Shekhar Das	Haridevpur Ajeya Sanghati - Shri Amar Sarkar	Nalin Sarkar Street; Shri Sanatan Dinda	NA		
2007	Khidderpore 25 Pally - Shri Bhabatosh Sutar; Pathuriaghata 5er Pally - Shri Gouranga Kuila; Laketown Natunpally Pradeep Sangha - Shri Prasanta Pal	Kankurgachi Mitali Sangha - Shri Prasanta Pal	New Alipore Suruchi Sangha - Shri Subodh Roy	Chakraberia Sarbojanin; Shri Purnendu Dey	NA		
2008	Telengabagan Sarbojanin - Shri Gopal Podder; Tangra Gholpara Sarbojanin - Shri Subrata Banerjee; Laketown Natunpally Pradeep Sangha - Shri Prasanta Pal	Santoshpur Lakepally - Shri Susanta Paul; Hatibagan Nabinpally - Shri Kamaldeep Dhar	Naktala Udayan Sangha - Shri Susanta Paul	Barisha Club - Shri Purnendu Dey	NA		
2009	Khidderpore Pally Sharadiya - Shri Prasanta Pal; Dum Dum Park Bharat Chakra - Shri Gouranga Kuila; New Alipore Suruchi Sangha - Shri Subodh Roy	Lala Bagan Nabankur Sangha - Shri Prasanta Pal	Rajdanga Naba Uday Sangha - Shri Bhabatosh Sutar	Santoshpur Lakepally - Shri Susanta Paul	NA		
2010	Barisha Club - Shri Bhabatosh Sutar Chakraberia Sarbojanin - Shri Shibsankar Das Haridebpur Vivekananda Park Athletic Club - Shri Susanta Paul	Mukul Sangha - Shri Biswanath Dey	Badamtala Ashar Sangha - Shri Susanta Paul	Nalin Sarkar Street Sarbojanin - Shri Sanatan Dinda	N/A	N/A	Tala Barowari - Amar Sarkar Badamtala Ashar Sangha - Susanta Paul Haridebpur Vivekananda Park Athletic Club - Susanta Paul Shibmandir Sarbojanin - Subrata Banerjee Nalin Sarkar Street Sarbojanin - Sanatan Dinda Mukul Sangha - Biswanath Dey Barisha Club - Bhabatosh Sutar Chaltabagan Lohapatty - Sutanu Maity Suruchi Sangha - Amar Sarkar Rajdanga Naba Uday Sangha - Bhabatosh Sutar Bosepukur Sitalamandir - Shibsankar Das Chakraberia Sarbojanin - Shibsankar Das
2011	Naktala Udayan Sangha - Shri Bhabatosh Sutar Suruchi Sangha- Shri Subrata Banerjee Nalin Sarkar Street Sarbojanin - Shri Sanatan Dinda	Naskarpur Sarbojanin - Shri Sanjib Saha	Chakraberia Sarbojanin - Shri Shibsankar Das & Shri Sanatan Dinda	Naktala Udayan Sangha - Shri Bhabatosh Sutar	N/A	N/A	Naktala Udayan Sangha -Bhabatosh Sutar Suruchi Sangha -Subrata Banerjee Nalin Sarkar Street Sarbojanin -Sanatan Dinda Naskarpur Sarbojanin -Sanjib Saha Chakraberia Sarbojanin - Shibsankar Das & Sanatan Dinda Barisha Club Shibmandir Sarbojanin - Subrata Banerjee Ajeya Sanghati - Bibhas Mukherjee & Subrata Mondal Laketown Netaji Sporting Club - Anirban Das Kidderpore Pally Saradiya - Susanta Paul Chaltabagan Lohapatty - Sutanu Maity Beleghata 33 No. Pallibashi Brinda - Shibsankar Das
2012	Naktala Udyan Sangha - Shri Bhabatosh Sutar Shivmandir Sarbojanin - Shri Subrata Banerjee Suruchi Sangha - Shri Subrata Banerjee	Tridhara Sammilani - Shri Gouranga Kuila	Bandhusree - Shri Bhabatosh Sutar	Barisha Club - Shri Sanatan Dinda	N/A	N/A	Suruchi Sangha - Subrata Banerjee Barisha Club -Sanatan Dinda Tridhara Sammilani - Gouranga Kuila Naktala Udyan Sangha -Bhabatosh Sutar Shivmandir Sarbojanin -Subrata Banerjee Dum Dum Park Yubak Brinda - Debatosh Kar Bandhusree - Bhabatosh Sutar Debdaru Fatak - Sanjib Saha Sikdarbagan Sarbojanin - Bhabatosh Sutar Tala Barowari - Amar Sarkar Chetla Agrani - Bhabatosh Sutar Chaltabagan Lohapatty - Sutanu Maity
2013	Naktala Udyan Sangha - Shri Bhabatosh Sutar; Ultadanga Sangrami - Shri Prasanta Pal; Suruchi Sangha - Shri Subrata Banerjee	Tala Barowari - Shri Amar Sarkar	N/A	Suruchi Sangha - Shri Naba Paul	Hindusthan Park Sarbojanin - Shri Arun Paul	N/A	Haridebpur Vivekananda Park Athletic Club - Susanta Paul Ultadanga Sangrami - Prasanta Pal Tridhara Sammilani - Gouranga Kuila Tala Barowari - Amar Sarkar Suruchi Sangha - Subrata Banerjee Rajdanga Naba Uday Sangha - Partha Das Gupta Naktala Udyan Sangha - Bhabatosh Sutar Kashi Bose Lane - Shibshankar Das Hatibagan Nabin Pally Bengal United Club - Prasanta Pal Barisha Tarun Tirtha - Aditi Chakrabarty Barisha Club - Sanatan Dinda Shortlist for Best Idol (Discovery - emerging new artist) : Hindusthan Park Sarbojanin - Arun Paul (Idol Artist) Santoshpur Trikon Park
2014	Behala Buroshibtala Janakalyan Sangha - Shri Shakti Sharma Kankurgachhi Jubak Brinda - Shri Anirban Das Suruchi Sangha - Shri Subrata Banerjee	Netaji Jatiya Sebadal - Shri Tanmoy Chakraborty	N/A	Abasar Sarbojanin Durgotsab - Shri Gouranga Kuila	Kalighat Nepal Bhattacharjee Street Club - Shri Kanchi Paul	N/A	Ultadanga Pallyshree - Susanta Paul Behala Adarshapally Sarbojanin - Bimal Samanta Tridhara Sammilani - Gouranga Kuila Suruchi Sangha - Subrata Banerjee Behala Buroshibtala Janakalyan Sangha - Shakti Sharma Kankurgachi Jubak Brinda - Anirban Das Dum Dum Park Tarun Dal - Anirban Das Dum Dum Park Tarun Sangha - Prasanta Pal Abasar Sarbojanin Durgotsav - Gouranga Kuila Netaji Jatiya Sevadal - Tanmoy Chakrabarty Shortlist for Best Idol (Discovery - emerging new artist) : Kalighat Nepal Bhattacharjee Street Club - Kanchi Paul (Idol Artist) Beleghata 33 No. Pallibashi Brinda - Piyali Sadhukhan (Idol Artist)
2015	Selimpur Pally - Shri Susanta Paul Suruchi Sangha - Shri Subrata Banerjee Chetla Agrani - Shri Sanatan Dinda	Behala Nutan Dal - Shri Bhabatosh Sutar Behala Friends - Shri Susanta Paul	N/A	Tala Barowari - Shri Subrata Banerjee	N/A	N/A	Selimpur Pally - Susanta Paul Tala Barowari - Subrata Banerjee Santoshpur Lakepally - Aditi Chakrabarty Behala Nutan Dal - Bhabatosh Sutar Ultadanga Pally Shree - Susanta Paul 41 Pally Club - Gouranga Kuila Behala Friends - Susanta Paul Chetla Agrani Club - Sanatan Dinda Barisha Club - Tarun Dey Wellington Nagarik Kalyan Samity Suruchi Sangha - Subrata Banerjee Dum Dum Park Tarun Sangha - Amar Sarkar
2016	Behala Nutan Dal - Shri Partha Dasgupta Chetla Agrani Club - Shri Bhabatosh Sutar Naktala Udayan Sangha - Shri Susanta Paul	66 Pally Club - Shri Purnendu Dey SB Park Sarbojanin Durgotsob - Shri Bhabatosh Sutar	N/A	Tala Barowari Shri Subrata banerjee	N/A	Shibmandir Sarbojanin - Shri Bimal Samanta	Tala Barowari - Subrata Banerjee Kashi Bose Lane - Pradip Das Santoshpur Avenue South Pallymangal Samity - Rintu Das SB Park Sarbojanin Durgotsob - Bhabatosh Sutar Behala Friends Behala Nutan Dal - Partha Das Gupta Chetla Agrani Club - Bhabatosh Sutar 66 Pally Club - Purnendu Dey Shibmandir Sarbojanin - Bimal Samanta Tridhara Akalbodhan - Gouranga Kuila 95 Pally Sarbojanin Durgotsab - Susanta Paul Naktala Udayan Sangha - Susanta Paul
2017	Tala Prattoy - Shri Debasis Barui Abasar Sarbojanin - Shri Subrata Banerjee Suruchi Sangha - Shri Subrata Banerjee	Kumartuli Sarbojanin - Shri Parimal Paul Prafulla Kanan Poschim Adhibasi Brinda - Shri Purnendu Dey	N/A	Behala Nutan Dal - Shri Pradip Das & Jogen Chowdhury	N/A	Nalin Sarkar Street Sarbojanin - Shri Rintu Das	Abasar Sarbojanin - Subrata Banerjee Bakul Bagan Sarbojanin - Bimal Samanta Behala Nutan Dal - Pradip Das & Jogen Chowdhury 25 Pally Sarbojanin - Rintu Das Beleghata 33 No. Pallibashi Brinda - Shibsankar Das Suruchi Sangha - Subrata Banerjee Nalin Sarkar Street Sarbojanin - Rintu Das Kumartuli Sarbojanin - Parimal Paul Prafulla Kanan Poschim Adhibasi Brinda - Purnendu Dey Thakurpukur SB Park - Bhabatosh Sutar Tala Barowari - Subrata Banerjee Tala Prattoy - Debasis Barui
2018	Tala Prattoy - Shri Debasis Barui 95 Pally Sarbojanin Durgotsab - Shri Bhabatosh Sutar 66 Pally Club - Shrimati Aditi Chakraborty	Arjunpur Amra Sabai Club - Shri Bhabatosh Sutar Chorebagan Sarbojanin - Shri Debatosh Kar	N/A	Behala Nutan Dal - Abin Chaudhury & Narayan Sinha	N/A	Suruchi Sangha - Shri Subrata Banerjee	Arjunpur Amra Sabai Club - Bhabatosh Sutar Chetla Agrani - Anirban Das Chorebagan Sarbojanin - Debatosh Kar Dum Dum Park Tarun Sangha - Rintu Das Behala Nutan Dal - Abin Chaudhury & Narayan Sinha Tala Prattoy - Debasis Barui Kashi Bose Lane - Pradip Das 95 Pally Sarbojanin Durgotsab - Bhabatosh Sutar 66 Pally Club - Aditi Chakraborty Suruchi Sangha - Subrata Banerjee Rajdanga Naba Uday Sangha - Subrata Banerjee Thakurpukur SB Park Sarbojanin - Partha Das Gupta
2019	Tala Prattoy - Shri Susanta Paul Naktala Udayan Sangha - Shri Bhabatosh Sutar Barisha Club - Shri Rintu Das	Wellington Nagarik Kalyan Samity - Shri Sanjib Saha & Shri Dipanjan Dey Samaj Sebi Sangha - Shri Pradip Das	N/A	Suruchi Sangha - Shri Bhabatosh Sutar	N/A	Thakurpukur SB Park Sarbojanin - Shri Partha Dasgupta	Arjunpur Amra Sabai Club - Asim Waqif & Hoang Quyet Ajeya Sanghati - Tarak Nath Das Tala Prattoy - Susanta Paul Behala Club - Aditi Chakrabarty Naktala Udayan Sangha - Bhabatosh Sutar Barisha Club - Rintu Das Kashi Bose Lane - Pradip Das Wellington Nagarik Kalyan Samity - Sanjib Saha & Dipanjan Dey North Tridhara Sarbojanin - Samrat Bhattacharjee Samaj Sebi Sangha - Pradip Das Suruchi Sangha- Bhabatosh Sutar Thakurpukur SB Park Sarbojanin - Partha Dasgupta
2020	Samaj Sebi Sangha - Shri Pradip Das Thakurpukur SB Park Sarbajanin - Shri Partha Dasgupta Barisha Club - Shri Rintu Das Kidderpore Pally Saradiya - Shri Raju Sarkar Badamtala Ashar Sangha - Shri Snehasish Maity	Masterda Smriti Sangha - Shri Manas Ray	N/A	Hatibagan Sarbojanin - Shri Sanjib Saha	N/A	N/A	Hatibagan Sarbojanin - Sanjib Saha Hindusthan Park Sarbojanin - Rintu Das Masterda Smriti Sangha - Manas Ray Chorebagan Sarbojanin - Bimal Samanta Dum Dum Tarun Dal - Debatosh Kar Samaj Sebi Sangha - Pradip Das Thakurpukur SB Park Sarbajanin - Partha Dasgupta Barisha Club -Rintu Das Kidderpore Pally Saradiya - Raju Sarkar Badamtala Ashar Sangha -Snehasish Maity Prafulla Kanan Balak Brinda East - Purnendu Dey Naktala Udayan Sangha - Bhabatosh Sutar
2021	95 Pally Sarbojanin Durgotsab - Shri Bhabatosh Sutar Arjunpur Amra Sabai Club - Shri Bhabatosh Sutar Kankurgachhi Jubak Brinda - Shri Pradip Das Tala Park Prattoy - Shri Susanta Paul Dumdum Park Sarbojanin - Shri Krishanu Pal	Jagat Mukherjee Park - Shri Subal Paul	N/A	Kashi Bose Lane - Shrimati Aditi Chakraborty	N/A	N/A	95 Pally Sarbojanin Durgotsab - Bhabatosh Sutar Arjunpur Amra Sabai Club - Bhabatosh Sutar Beleghata 33 No. Pallibashi Brinda - Shibshankar Das Paschim Putiary Pally Unnayan Samity - Somenath Tamli Jagat Mukherjee Park - Subal Paul Chorebagan Sarbojanin - Bimal Samanta Kankurgachhi Jubak Brinda - Pradip Das Kashi Bose Lane - Aditi Chakraborty Naktala Udayan Sangha - Pradip Das Tala Park Prattoy - Susanta Paul Rajdanga Naba Uday Sangha - Moloy Roy & Subhamoy Sinha Dumdum Park Sarbojanin - Krishanu Pal
2022	Arjunpur Amra Sabai Club - Shri Bhabatosh Sutar Haridebpur Vivekananda Park Athletic Club - Shri Susanta Paul & Shri Adhir Paul (Idol artist) Thakurpukur SB Park Sarbojanin - Shri Partha Dasgupta Chorebagan Sarbojanin - Shri Bimal Samanta & Shri Subrata Mridha (Idol artist) Chetla Agrani Club - Shri Subrata Banerjee	Dumdum Tarun Dal - Shri Pradip Das & Shri Pintu Sikdar	N/A	Nalin Sarkar Street Sarbojanin - Shri Manas Das & Shri Subrata Mridha (Idol artist)			Arjunpur Amra Sabai Club - Bhabatosh Sutar Aswininagar Bandhumahal Club - Samrat Bhattacharjee 95 Pally Sarbojanin - Susanta Paul Nalin Sarkar Street Sarbojanin - Manas Das Haridebpur Vivekananda Park Athletic Club - Susanta Paul Dumdum Tarun Dal - Pradip Das Hindusthan Park Sarbojanin - Raju Sarkar Paschim Putiary Pally Unnayan Samity - Somenath Tamli Thakurpukur SB Park Sarbojanin - Partha Dasgupta Tala Prattoy - Susanta Paul Chorebagan Sarbojanin - Bimal Samanta Chetla Agrani Club - Subrata Banerjee
2023	Arjupur Amra Sabai - Shri Bhabatosh Sutar Dumdum Tarun Dal - Shri Pradip Das Hatibagan Nabin Pally - Shri Anirban Das Purbachal Sakti Sangha - Shri Partha Das Gupta Tala Prattoy - Shri Susanta Paul	Dakshindari Youths - Shri Anirban Das	N/A	Chorebagan Sarbojanin - Shri Subrata Mridha (idol artist) and Shri Debasish Barui (theme artist)	N/A	N/A	Arjupur Amra Sabai - Bhabatosh Sutar Chetla Agrani - Subrata Banerjee Chorebagan Sarbojanin - Debasis Barui Dakshindari Youths - Anirban Das Dumdum Tarun Dal - Pradip Das Dakshinpara Durgotsab Committee - Debasis Barui Dum Dum Park Bharat Chakra - Anirban Das Hatibagan Nabin Pally - Anirban Das Pally Mangal Samity - Purnendu Dey Purbachal Sakti Sangha - Partha Das Gupta Rajdanga Naba Uday Sangha - Moloy Roy & Subhamay Sinha Tala Prattoy - Susanta Paul
2024	Salt Lake A.K. Block Association - Shri Bhabatosh Sutar Alipore Sarbojanin - Shri Anirban Das Arjunpur Amra Sabai - Shri Bhabatosh Sutar Purbachal Sakti Sangha - Shri Partha Das Gupta Tala Prattoy - Shri Susanta Paul	Dakshinpara Durgotsab Committee - Shri Debasish Barui	N/A	Behala Club- Shri Pintu Sikdar (Idol Artist) and Shri Pradip Das (Theme Artist)	N/A	N/A	Salt Lake A.K. Block Association - Bhabatosh Sutar Santoshpur Lake Pally - Abhijit Ghatak Alipore Sarbojanin - Anirban Das Santoshpur Trikon Park - Asim Pal & Jayasree Barman Arjunpur Amra Sabai - Bhabatosh Sutar Purbachal Sakti Sangha - Partha Das Gupta Kashi Bose Lane - Rintu Das Tala Prattoy - Susanta Paul Hatibagan Nabinpally - Raju Sarkar Dum Dum Tarun Dal - Pradip Das Dakshinpara Durgotsab Committee - Shri Debasis Barui Behala Club - Pradip Das Kendua Shanti Sangha - Susanta Paul
2025	Behala Friends - Shri Pradip Das Kashi Bose Lane - Shri Anirban Das Purbachal Shakti Sangha - Shri Partha Dasgupta Samaj Sebi Sangha - Shri Pradip Das Tala Prattoy - Shri Bhabatosh Sutar	Pratapaditya Road Tricone Park - Shri Deep Das and Shrimati Eshika Chandra	N/A	Thakurpukur SB Park Sarbojanin - Shri Raju Sarkar (Idol Artist)	N/A	N/A	Alipore Sarbojanin - Anirban Das Arjunpur Amra Sabai Club - Shovin Bhattacharjee Behala Friends - Pradip Das Dakshinpara Durgotsab Committee - Debasis Barui Dum Dum Park Bharat Chakra Club - Susanta Shibani Paul Kashi Bose Lane - Anirban Das Nalin Sarkar Street Sarbojanin - Sanatan Dinda Pratapaditya Road Tricone Park - Deep Das & Eshika Chandra Purbachal Shakti Sangha - Partha Das Gupta Samaj Sebi Sangha - Pradip Das Tala Prattoy - Bhabotosh Sutar Thakurpukur SB Park Sarbojanin - Raju Sarkar
2026	Behala Club - Pradip Das FD Block Sarbojanin - Prasanta Paul Naktala Udayan Sangha - Anirban Das Rajdanga Amra Kajan Kalyan Samity - Purnendu Dey Telipukur Yuba Sangha - Bhabatosh Sutar	Dum Dum Park Bharat Chakra - Manash Das		Behala Youngmen's Association - Sanatan Dinda (Idol Artist)			Behala Club - Pradip Das Behala Youngmen's Association - Sanatan Dinda Dum Dum Park Bharat Chakra - Manash Das FD Block Sarbojanin - Prasanta Paul Manicktala Chaltabagan Lohapatty - Aditi Chakrabarty Naktala Udayan Sangha - Anirban Das Laketown Netaji Sporting Club - Moloy Roy & Subhamoy Sinha Rajdanga Amra Kajan Kalyan Samity - Purnendu Dey Rajdanga Naba Uday Sangha - Debasis Barui Samaj Sebi Sangha - Biswanath De Santoshpur Avenue South Club - Susanta Shivani Paul Telipukur Yuba Sangha - Bhabatosh Sutar

Most wins:
The collective most wins are by the following Pujas:

- New Alipore Suruchi Sangha (12)
- Naktala Udayan Sangha (7)
- Barisha Club (7) *
- Tala Park Pratyay (7)
- Nalin Sarkar Street (6)
- Adi Ballygunge (5)
- Mudiali (4)
- Arjunpur Amra Sabai Club (5)
- State Bank Park Sarbojanin Durgotsob (5)
- Behala Adarshapally (4)
- Shibmandir Sarbojanin Durgotsab Samiti (4)
- Behala Natun Dal (4)
- Kashi Bose Lane (4)
- Laketown Natunpally Pradeep Sangha (3)
- Tala Barowari (3)
- Sunilnagar (3)
- Telengabagan Sarbojanin (3)
- Haridevpur Ajeya Sanghati (3)
- Pathuriaghata 5er Pally (3)
- Karbagan (3)
- Chakraberia Sarbojanin (3)
- Kidderpore Pally Saradiya (3)
- Hatibagan Sarbojanin (3)
- Behala Club (4)
- Chetla Agrani Club (3)
- Chorebagan Sarbojanin (3)
- Samaj Sebi Sangha (3)
- Purbachal Shakri Sangha (3)

Among the artisans Sanatan Dinda leads with five wins, one for Hatibagan Sarbojanin, another for Barisha Club and three for Nalin Sarkar Street.

Amar Sarkar has 3 wins for Ajeya Sanghati

- Barisha Club's collective win is 7. This club is a merge of the former clubs Shrishti and Sahajatri. Sahajatri won one award in 1998 and Shrishti won two awards in 2001 and 2004. Hence together with these awards and the award for 2008, 2010 and 2012 ,2020
- Laketown Natunpally Pradeep Sangha was the first committee to win the prestigious Asian Paints Sharad Samman for three consecutive years (2006-2008). This rare feat was later matched by Naktala Udayan Sangha and Suruchi Sangha. Adi Balligunge was the first committee to win the prestigious Asian Paints Sharad Samman for four consecutive years 1985-1988.
