= Samir Mondal =

Indian watercolour painter (born 1952)

Samir Mondal সমীর মণ্ডল
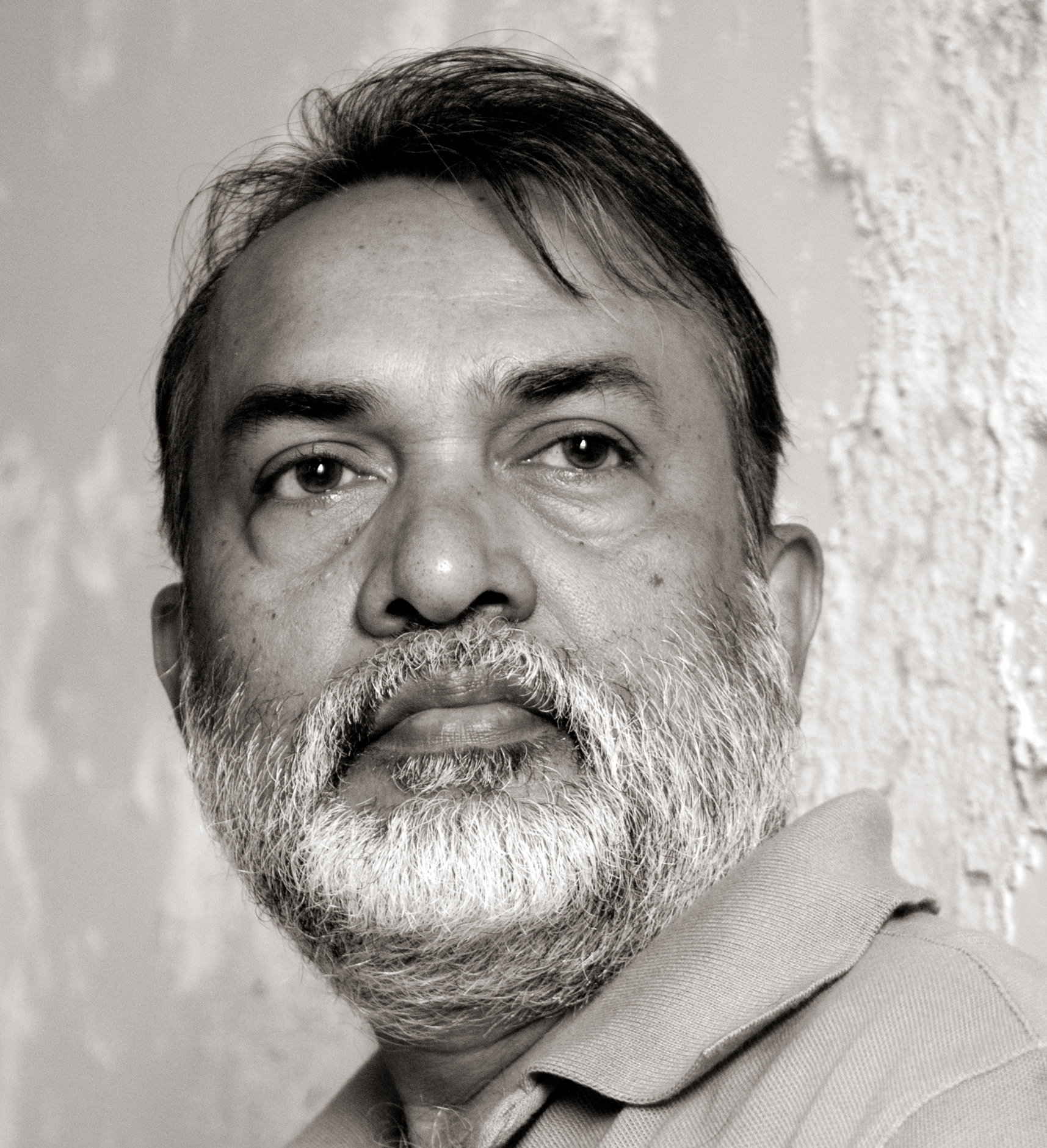
- Samir Mondal at his studio in Mumbai
- Born: 13 March 1952 (age 74); North 24 Parganas district, West Bengal, India
- Education: Government College of Art & Craft, Kolkata
- Known for: watercolour painting
- Website: www.samirmondal.com

Samir Mondal (Bengali: সমীর মণ্ডল) (born 13 March 1952) is an Indian watercolour painter. His main contribution to Indian art of modern times is a continual revival of watercolour painting.

== Early life and education ==
Born in Balti, a small village in North 24 Parganas district, West Bengal, Mondal graduated in fine arts from the Government College of Art & Craft, Kolkata in 1975. Thereafter he went to Germany for higher studies.

== Personal life ==
He married Madhumita in 1980. They have two children, Somak and Sohini. He lives and works in Goregaon West, Mumbai.

== Career ==
Mondal started his solo career in 1980, and after a brief stay in Bangalore, settled in Bombay (now Mumbai). Here by 1987, he was illustrating political cartoons in water colour for noted magazine Illustrated Weekly of India.

Over the past four decades he has done solo and group exhibitions in India and abroad. These include, National Art exhibition of Lalit Kala Akademi (Delhi), ‘Freedom of Expression’ and ‘Tribute to Mother Teresa’ by RPG Enterprises, 100 Years of Indian Cinema, People for Animals, ‘Art with a Heart’ at National Gallery of Modern Art, Mumbai, ‘Celebrations-97’ at Napa Art Gallery, Nepal, ‘Confluence’ at Art Connoisseur Gallery, London and Gallery Asiana, New York in collaboration with Gallery Sumukha, Bangalore. Another exhibition titled "6x10" featuring his 60 paintings of flowers, held at the Jamaat Art Gallery in Colaba, Mumbai.

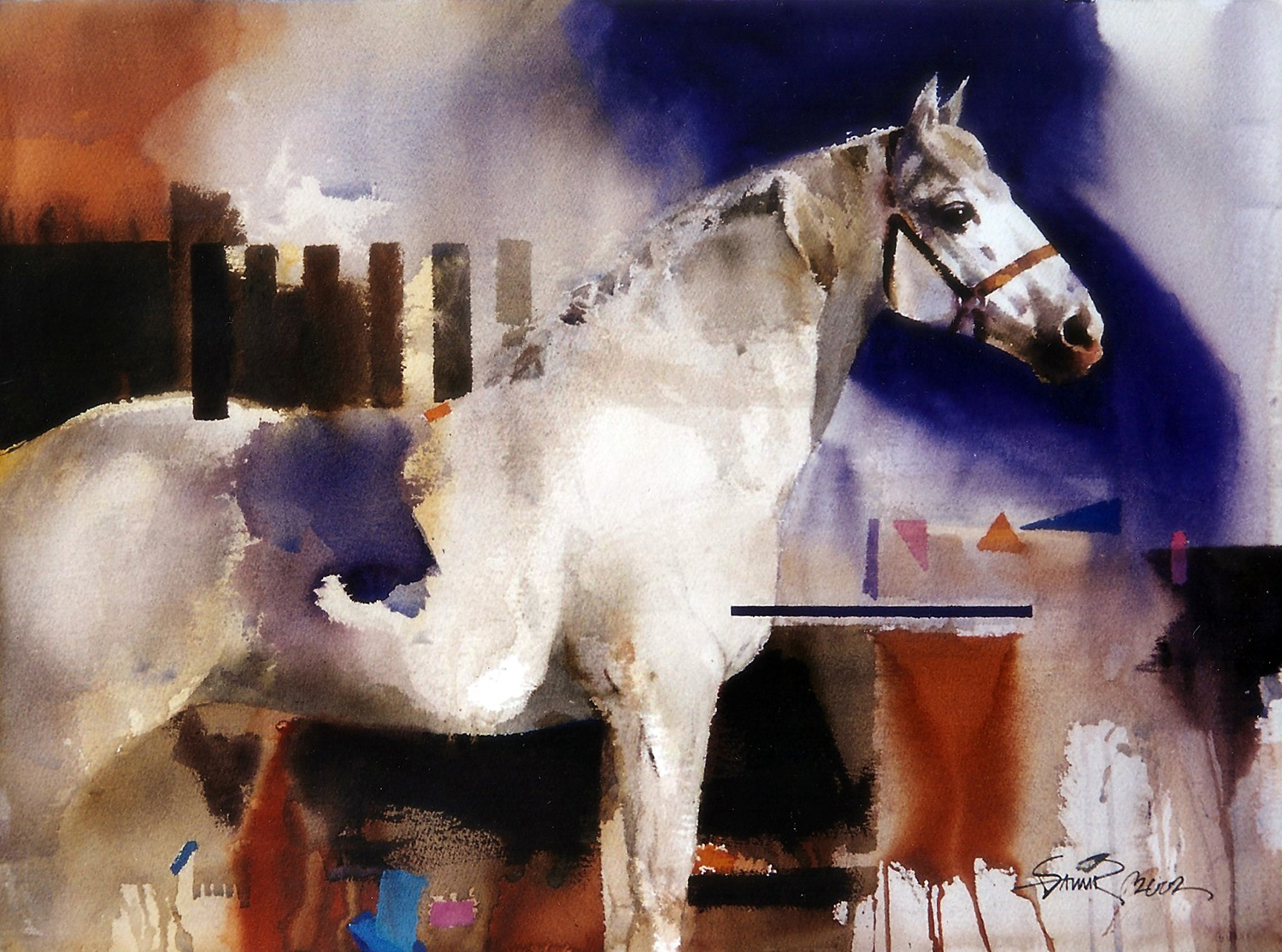
Monsoon

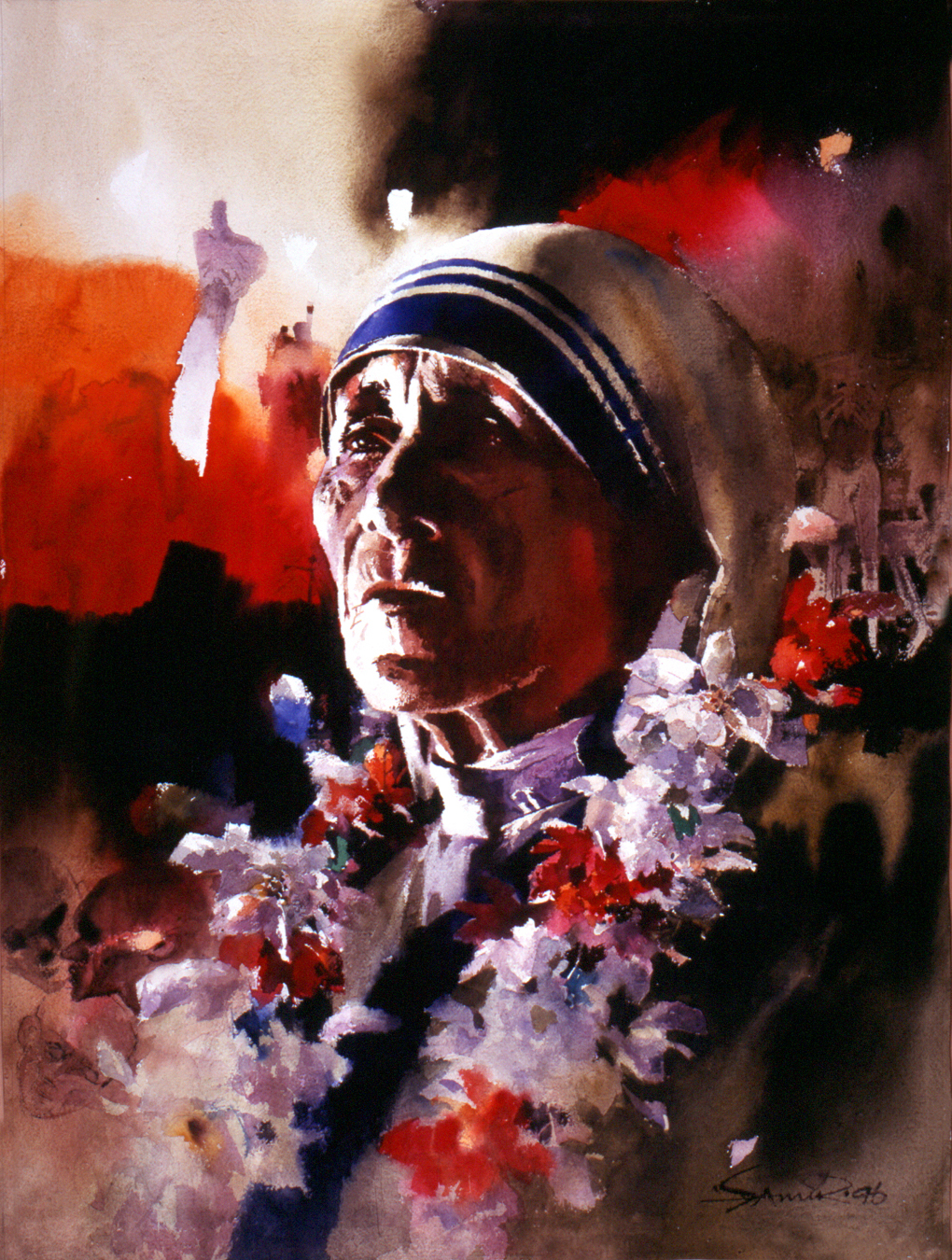
Mother Teresa

Another notable work includes painting for the 2007 Hindi film, Taare Zameen Par, Mondal painted two watercolour paintings which characters Ishaan and Nikumbh, played by Darsheel Safary and Aamir Khan respectively

== Awards ==
- Awards: 1970, 1972, 1973, 1974 Government College of Art & Craft, Kolkata
- Awards: 1978, 1983 Best Painting Award 'All India' – Academy of Fine Arts, Kolkata
- Awards: 1979, 1983 West Bengal State Academy, Kolkata
- Award: 1986 AIFACS all India Exhibition, New Delhi
- Award: 1995 A.P.Council of Artists, Hyderabad
