= Biman Bihari Das =

Indian sculptor (born 1943)

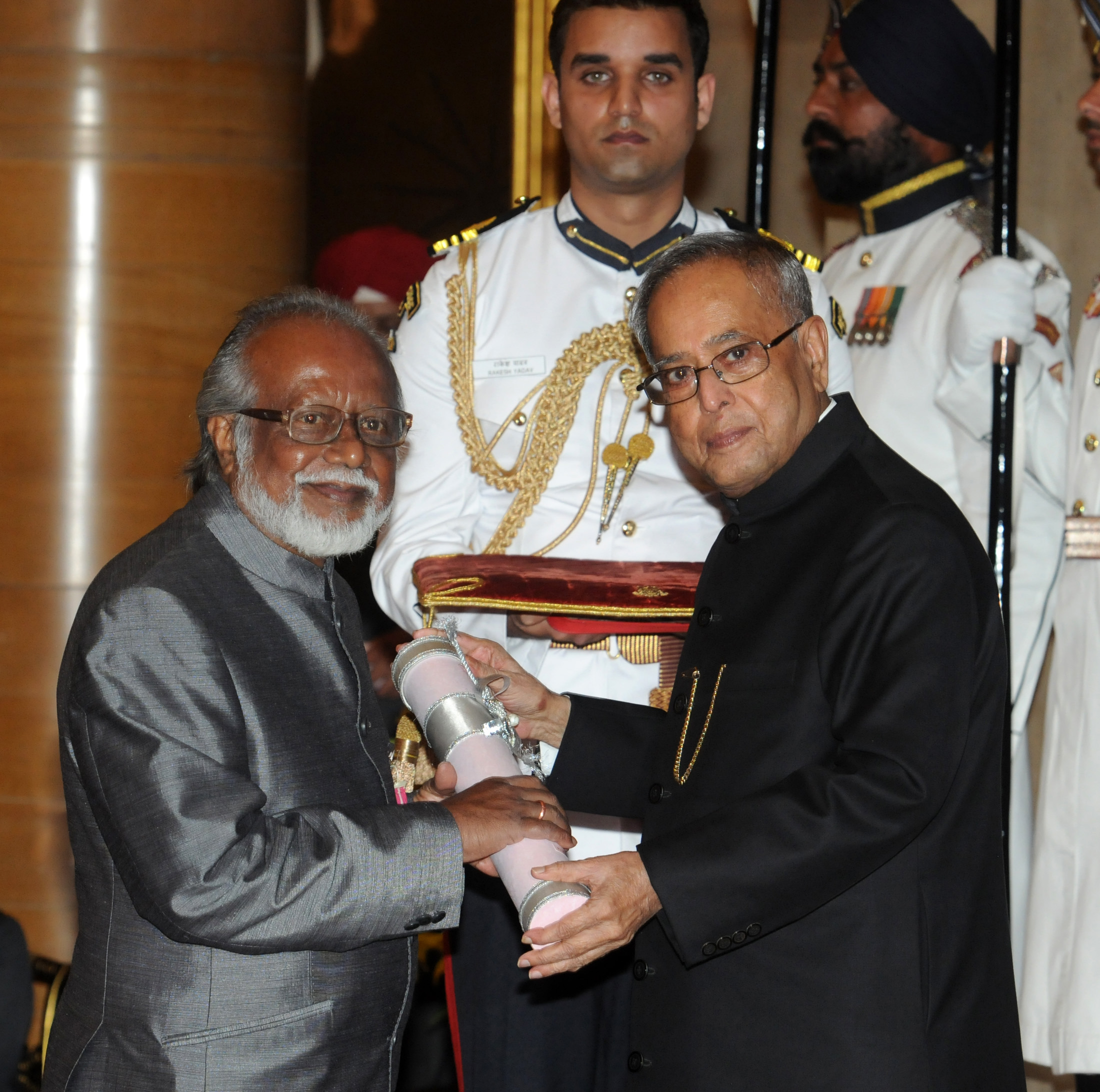
- Prof. Biman Bihari Das receives the Padma Shri from President Pranab Mukherjee, 2014
- Born: 1 January 1943 (age 83); Tamluk, West Bengal, India
- Occupations: Sculptor & painter
- Awards: Padma Shri
- Website: bimanbdas.com

Biman Bihari Das is an Indian sculptor and former Principal of the Government College of Art & Craft, Kolkata. He was honoured by the Government of India, in 2014, by bestowing on him the Padma Shri, the fourth highest civilian award, for his services to the field of Fine Arts.

== Biography ==
Biman Bihari Das was born on 1 January 1943, at Tamluk town of West Bengal, in India. He studied art at the Government College of Art & Craft, Kolkata and passed the Diploma in Modeling and Sculpture, in 1966, with first class and distinction. Later, he joined Calcutta University and passed the course of Teachers' Training and Art Appreciation in 1967.

Bihari Das received a Fulbright Fellowship from the US and UGC grant under the Indo-Hungarian cultural exchange program, based in Budapest, for pursuing his art career. He, later, became the principal of the Government College of Art & Craft, Kolkata but later moved to New Delhi, to take up the post of the principal of the College of Art, Delhi. He has also served as the vice president of the All India Fine Arts and Crafts Society.

Das lives an active life with constant interaction with the Indian art scene.

== Exhibitions ==
Das has held exhibitions, both solo and group, in many parts of the world. His solo exhibitions, more than 22 in number, have been staged at places like New Jersey, Cairo and Budapest, apart from many cities in India. He had a retrospective in the National Exhibition of Art of 2005, at Sahitya Kala Parishad, New Delhi, which was sponsored by Birla Academy of Art and Culture, Kolkata. He was also one of the artist participants of the Silver Jubilee exhibitions of Lalit Kala Akademi, organized at many European and Middle East countries, along with Salarjung Museum, Hyderabad and Mumbai. Some of his notable exhibitions were: Biennale Belgium – 1974, Triennale India – 1978, Second Asian Art Show, Fukuoka Japan – 1986, Biennale Bangladesh, Dhaka – 1987, Contemporary Asian Show, Seoul – 1988, and India Festival in USSR, Moscow – 1988.

== Awards and recognitions ==
Biman Bihari Das was honoured by the Government of India by awarding him the Padma Shri, in 2014, in recognition of his efforts to the cause of art. He has also received several other awards such as:

- Prof. S. N. Ghosal Award – Government College of Art & Craft, Kolkata – 1965
- Education Secretary Award – Government of West Bengal – 1966
- Kalavibhushan Award – All India Fine Arts and Crafts Society, New Delhi – 1968
- Sir Ushanath Sen Memorial Medal – A1FACS, New Delhi – 1971
- Sir Ushanath Sen Memorial Medal – A1FACS, New Delhi – 1972
- Punjab Lalit Kala Academy Award, Chandigarh – 1972
- Lalit Kala Academy Award, New Delhi – 1972
- D. P. Roychowdhury Memorial Medal – AIFACS, New Delhi – 1975
- AIFACS Award, New Delhi – 1976
- Award – Sahitya Kala Parishad, New Delhi – 1979
- Birla Academy of Art and Culture Award, Calcutta – 1980
- Sahitya Kala Parishad Award New Delhi – 1984

A scholarship has been instituted in the honour of Das, as an encouragement to the upcoming artists. His sculpture of Jawaharlal Nehru has been commissioned at the Indian Commission office at Singapore. He also has sculptures installed at:

- Sculpture at the Rabindranath Tagore Centre of Indian Council for Cultural Relations, Ministry of External Affairs, Government of India,
- Bust of Mahatma Gandhi in various countries such as Brazil, Venezuela, Spain and Italy
- Bronze bust Of Subramania Bharati and a marble busts of Jawaharlal Nehru and Indira Gandhi in Mauritius
- Bust of Giani Zail Singh at Rashtrapati Bhawan
- Bronze statue of Dhyan Chand in front of the National Stadium, New Delhi
- Marble Statue of Sri Sri Ramthakur at Ram Thakur Mandir
- Bronze statue of Ishwar Chandra Vidyasagar, at Kolkata

The Open Sculpture Park at Kalagram, Sector 13, Chandigarh also has a rock sculpture by Das.

== See also ==
- Government College of Art & Craft
- All India Fine Arts and Crafts Society
