= Reba Hore =

Indian artist (1926–2008)

- Born: 1926
- Died: 2008 (aged 81–82)
- Education: Government College of Art & Craft, Kolkata
- Spouse: Somnath Hore
- Children: Chandana Hore

Reba Hore (1926–2008) was an Indian artist and activist. She has worked in various mediums ranging from water colors, mixed media, oil paints, pastels to terracotta. Her artworks were spontaneous, deeply personal and rooted in her daily life experiences. She was the wife of Somnath Hore, an accomplished sculptor and print maker himself.

== Life ==
Reba had completed her graduation in economics and became a member of the Communist Party in 1948. Later, she joined the Government College of Art & Craft in Kolkata. After completing her studies, she started teaching art at St. John's Diocesan School from 1951. It was three years later, when she married Somnath Hore in 1954.

She lived and worked in different cities, namely Kolkata, New Delhi and Shantiniketan over the course of her life. Hore died in 2008.

== Career ==
Hore was mostly under the shadow of her husband. However, the incredible number of artworks created in a style of her own make her stand out.

== Style and influences ==
Artworks
- "Head 3"
- "Seated" (1992)
- "Mourning Group"

Reba Hore's works describe her emotional responses to the stimuli of her day-to-day life experiences. These stimuli ranged from as simple as the animals in her courtyard, the everyday lives of the people and the folk zest of the Shantiniketan to an emotional portrayal of momentous human tragedies like the Bengal famine, which was contemporary to her times.

The depictions in her paintings are introspective comprehensions of the universal human drama. The lines and colors in her dry pastels-mixed media works are emphasized. She utilizes rough and spontaneous strokes to display the range of human emotion during tragedy.

== Collections ==
- The Seagull Foundation for the Arts, Kolkata
- Birla Academy of Art and Culture, Kolkata
- Lalit Kala Akademi, New Delhi
- Art Heritage, New Delhi
- Netherlands Embassy, New Delhi

== Exhibitions ==
- 2022 - In Luminous Tenderness, Birla Academy Of Art and Culture, By Golf Green Art Gallery, Kolkata
- 2021 - The Broken Foot Journal and Other Stories, Experimenter Gallery, Ballygunge Place, Kolkata
- 2016 - The Overwhelming Imagination : The Junction of Interactivity, Art Konsult, New Delhi
- 2011 - Art of the Land & Land in Art, Galerie 88, Kolkata
- 2006 - Reba Hore, Gallery Sumukha, Bangalore
- 1956-58 - Joint show with her husband, Somnath Hore
