= Sudip Roy =

Indian artist (born 1960)

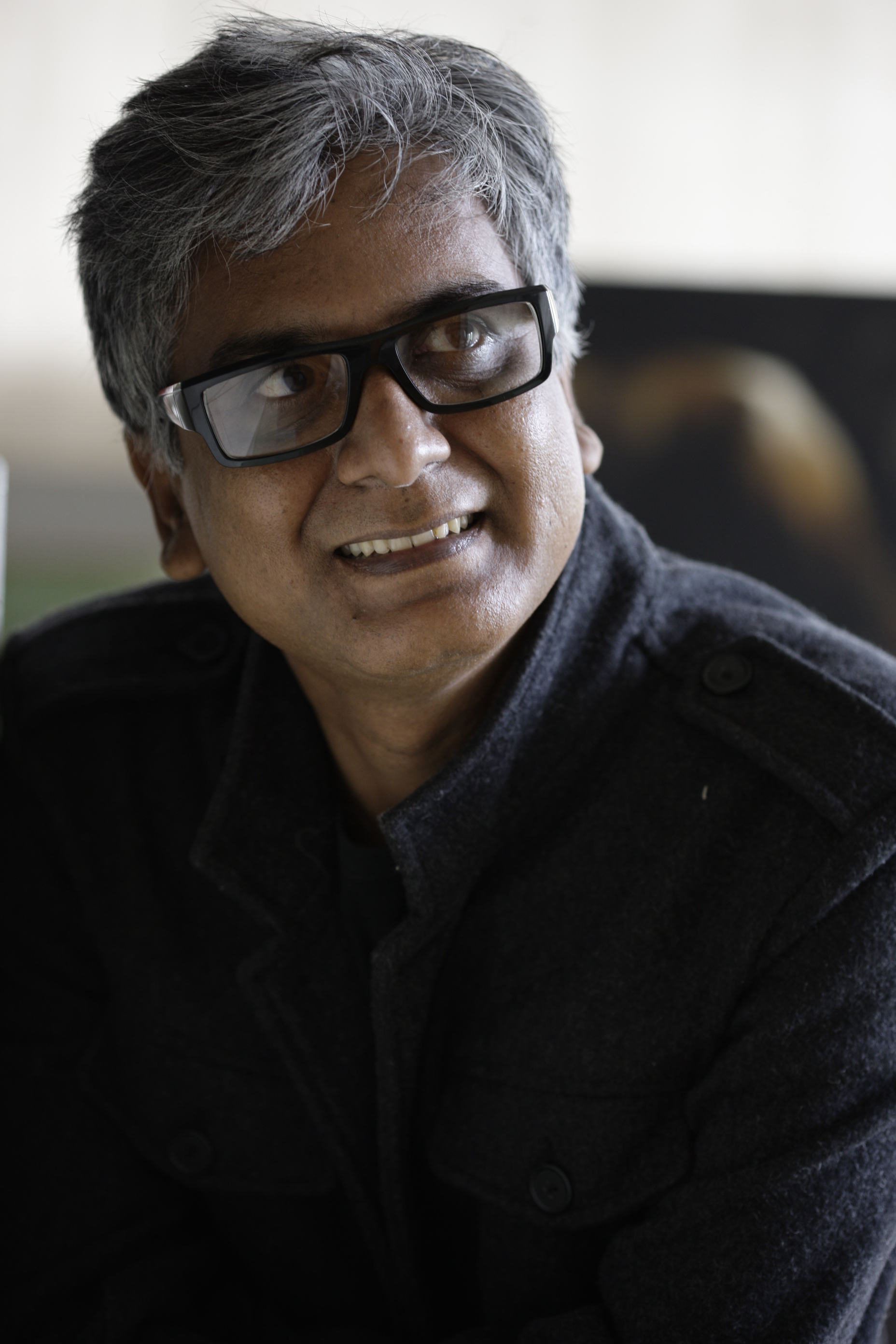
- Roy in his studio
- Born: October 1960 (age 65); Baharampore, West Bengal, India
- Education: Government College of Art & Craft
- Known for: Visual arts
- Notable work: Charulata, Benaras, Krishna, Time series(Abstract), Durga, Sadhu, Monkey
- Awards: The 'Lorenzo il Magnifico' Award

Sudip Roy (Bengali: সুদীপ রায়) is an Indian artist whose works include water colours and abstract paintings.

== Art career ==
He had his first solo show in Delhi in 1996 at the gallery Art Today, showing a few architectural watercolours and a few panoramic drawings done from his early college days. In 2012, he held another solo exhibition in Delhi.

In 2011, Roy was part of a group exhibition celebrating painter and poet Rabindranath Tagore. His contribution, Charulata, referenced one of Tagore's female characters. In 2015, he exhibited a series of abstract paintings at the India Habitat Center.

His work was part of the auction that helped raise money for the sculpture of Mahatma Gandhi in London’s Parliament.

During CWG XIX (India), an exhibition was curated by Rupika Chawla to welcome the guests. A print of that work is at Jawaharlal Nehru Stadium Metro. Taj Hotel, Delhi showcased his works to promote CWG.

== Awards ==
- 1979 Gold Medal from Sahitya Parishad, Calcutta
- 1981 Govt. College of Arts & Crafts
- 1982 Gold Medal in All India Fine Art Exhibition of Fine Arts, Calcutta.
- 1982 Govt. College of Arts & Crafts
- 1984 Indian Society of Oriental Art
- 1985 Indian Society of Oriental Art
- 1986 Indian Society of Oriental Art
- 1991 AIFACS, Delhi
- 2011 Lorenzo il Magnifico, Florence
