= Sanatan Dinda =

Indian visual artist from Kolkata India

Sanatan Dinda সনাতন দিন্দা
- Born: 5 February 1971 (age 55); Kumartuli, North Kolkata, Kolkata
- Education: Government College of Art & Craft, Kolkata
- Known for: Painting; drawing; sculpture; body painting
- Awards: Asian Paints Sharad Shamman
- Website: sanatandinda.in

Sanatan Dinda (Bengali: সনাতন দিন্দা; born 5 February 1971) is an Indian visual artist from Kolkata, India. He grew in stature to be the first Indian artist having a displayed portrait of Mother Teresa at the Buckingham Palace (a commissioned work).

== Early life and education ==
Dinda was born in Kumartuli intestines of North Kolkata, he graduated fine arts (Western painting) from the Government College of Art & Craft, Kolkata in 1992.

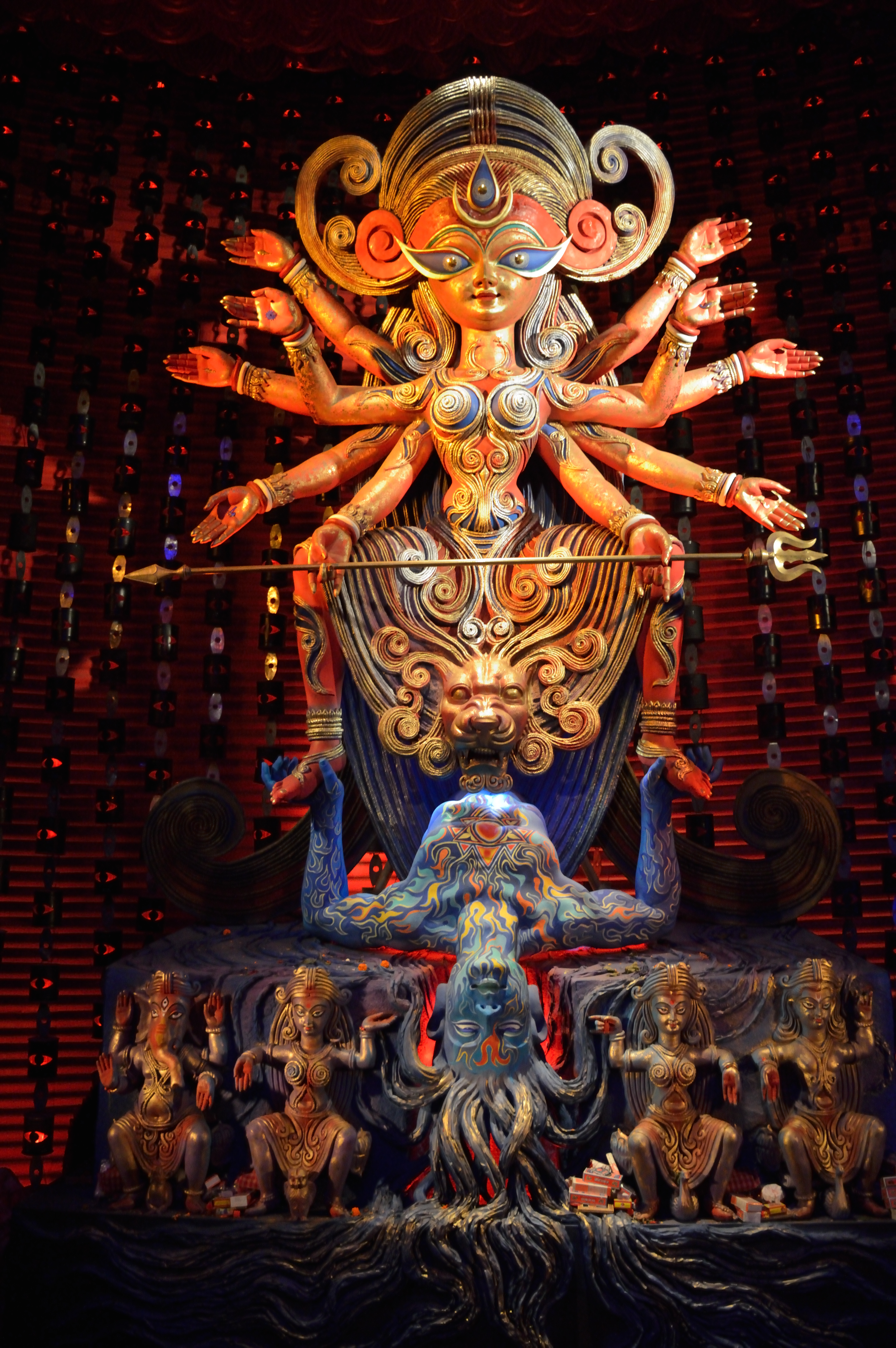
Durga idol created by Dinda in Kolkata, 2015

Dinda emerged as one of the prominent Durga Puja designers of contemporary Kolkata. He began his artistic journey in the late 1990s with the design of Hatibagan Sarbojanin Puja, where he introduced innovative approaches to pandal decoration and idol-making. His endeavors earned the club its first Asian Paints Sharad Shamman award in 1998.

Dinda developed an artistic style that combined traditional folk practices, contemporary art movements, and religious influences, including Dadaism, Surrealism, Pop Art, and Tantric art. He incorporated elements of Madhubani painting, Pipli appliqué work, and traditional wooden dolls into his installations. He placed particular emphasis on the expressive features of Goddess Durga, especially her eyes and facial expressions, through which he conveyed spiritual significance and visual intensity.

His childhood experiences in Kumartuli, where he observed traditional idol-making practices, significantly influenced his artistic development. Despite achieving professional recognition and success, he maintained a strong connection with his humble background and indigenous artistic traditions. His formal training at the Government Art College, Kolkata, further shaped and strengthened his artistic practice.

Through his Durga Puja installations, Dinda reinterpreted traditional religious imagery through contemporary artistic expressions. He brought art beyond the confines of galleries and academic institutions and made it accessible to the wider public. Thus, he contributed significantly to Kolkata's Durga Puja culture by integrating folk traditions, contemporary artistic experimentation, and religious symbolism into a distinctive visual language.

Dinda contributed to the Durga puja of his locality and in doing so has picked up various awards. His artwork is private collections of former cricketer Sachin Tendulkar Amjad Ali Khan, RPG Enterprises, Reliance Industries, Ballarpur Industries Limited, etc. His exhibition at the Hyatt Regency hotel in Kolkata on 28–29 January 2010 was inaugurated by Amjad Ali Khan.

== Awards ==
- Dinda won World BodyPainting Festival in 2022
