= Sunil Das =

Indian artist (1939–2015)

- Born: 4 August 1939; Calcutta, India
- Died: 10 August 2015 (aged 76); Kolkata, India
- Education: Government College of Art & Craft, Kolkata; École des Beaux-Arts, Paris
- Known for: Painting, Drawing
- Movement: Expressionism
- Awards: Padma Shri; National Award, 1978
- Website: www.sunildas.net

Sunil Das (4 August 1939 – 10 August 2015) was an Indian expressionist painter. He is known for the paintings in his Bull Series and his piece "Woman".

He was the founder member of Society of Contemporary Artists.

== Early life and background ==
Sunil Das was born in Calcutta, Kolkata, India.

He joined the Government College of Art & Craft, Kolkata in 1955, then won a French Government scholarship to study at the École des Beaux-Arts in Paris.

Das is the only Indian to receive the prestigious Shiromani Kala Puraskar for his artistic excellence while studying for his undergraduate degree at the Government College of Art and Craft, Kolkata.

He died in 2015.

== Career ==
Das joined Government of India's Handloom division, Ministry of Textiles.

Sunil Das was one of India's most important post-modernist painters. He went through different styles of painting throughout his career. Das said,"To prevent myself from producing the same kind of work, I keep altering my vision. From the day people begun to see me as a painter, a huge responsibility fell upon me, particularly to respond to the feelings of the people at the grassroots level who are also my viewer, as also to delve deep into realities of life around me." At 60 years of age, he could look back at his nine to ten phases of paintings, all of them marked by supreme skill and a sense of integrity. An indefatigable painter, Das jumped from one style to another easily. He was inspired by the force and the strength of the moving horse and went on to create a work made out of charcoal titled- Horses in Motion. His works revolved around Man-Woman relationships, Woman in her sexual empowerment and In her loneliness. He had around 88 solo exhibitions across the world including having his work included in the Paris Biennale.

- Bull series
- A woman in her failings (oil on canvas)
- Horse series (charcoal)

== Exhibitions ==
=== Solo exhibitions ===
- 2008 ‘Endless Night’, Ganges Art, Kolkata
- 2005-06 ‘Art Moves – Works by Sunil Das’, organized by Delhi Art Gallery, New Delhi at Jehangir Art Gallery, Mumbai, Park Hotel, Kolkata and Rabindra Bhavan, Lalit Kala Akademi, New Delhi
- 2005 ‘Horses…and Bulls – Paintings on Canvas and Paper by Sunil Das’, Jamaat, Mumbai
- 2003 ‘Sunil Das in Retrospect 1957-2003’,. ITC Sonar Bangla Art Gallery, Kolkata
- 2001 ‘Drawings – Bulls and Horses’, Dhoomimal Art Centre, New Delhi
- 2000 Art Heritage, New Delhi

=== Participations ===
- 1999 Annual Exhibition, 32nd Anniversary of Birla Academy of Art and Culture, Kolkata
- 1989 20th International Biennale, Sao Paulo, Brazil
- 1989 International Biennale, Havana, Cuba
- 1989 Festival of Japan, Tokyo
- 1989 International Triennale, New Delhi

== Awards ==
- In 2014 the Government of India conferred upon Sunil its fourth-highest civilian award, the Padma Shri.
- Recipient of the National Award in 1959 and 1978

== Death ==
In 2015, Sunil died due to a massive cardiac arrest, aged 76.
