= Government College of Art & Craft =

Art college in Kolkata, India

Government College of Art & Craft, Calcutta
- সরকারি চারু ও কারুকলা মহাবিদ্যালয়, কলকাতা
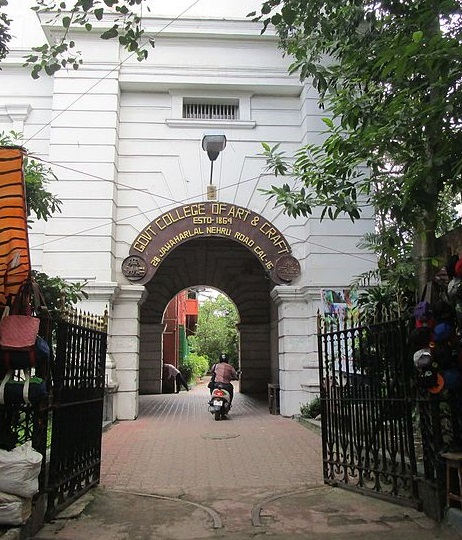
- Entrance of Govt College of Art and Craft, Kolkata
- Other name: GCAC
- Motto in English: Art is the response of man's creative soul to the call of the real - Rabindranath Tagore
- Type: Public, Calcutta Art College
- Established: August 16, 1854; 172 years ago (as School of Industrial Art); 1864; 162 years ago (as Government School of Art); 1951; 75 years ago (as Government College of Art & Craft)
- Founder: Abanindranath Tagore
- Academic affiliations: University of Calcutta
- Principal: Chatrapati Dutta
- Location: 28 Jawaharlal Nehru Road, Kolkata, West Bengal, India; 22.5571913°N 88.3500542°E
- Website: www.gcac.edu.in

- Location within Kolkata Location within India

The Government College of Art & Craft (GCAC) in Kolkata is one of the oldest Art colleges in India. It was founded on 16 August 1854 at Garanhata, Chitpur, "with the purpose of establishing an institution for teaching the youth of all classes, industrial art based on scientific methods." as the School of Industrial Art. The institute was later renamed as the Government School of Art, and in 1951 it became the Government College of Art & Craft.

== History ==
The school opened on 16 August 1854 at Garanhata as a private art school. The school was shifted to the building of Mutty Lall Seal in Colootola in November 1854. In 1859, Garick joined as Head Teacher. In 1864, it was taken over by the government and on 29 June 1864, Henry Hover Locke joined as its principal. It was soon renamed as the Government School of Art. Locke made a comprehensive scheme of Curriculum of studies for the institution. The venue of the school was shifted to 166, Bowbazar Street in the 1880s. After the death of Locke on 25 December 1885 M. Schaumburg became the new principal. A new post of Assistant Principal was created, and on 29 January 1886, an Italian artist O. Ghilardi joined the post. In February 1892, the institute was shifted to its present site adjacent to the Indian Museum. After the death of its principal, Jobbins Ernest Binfield Havel joined the school as its principal on 6 July 1896.

=== Havell, Brown and Abanindranath ===
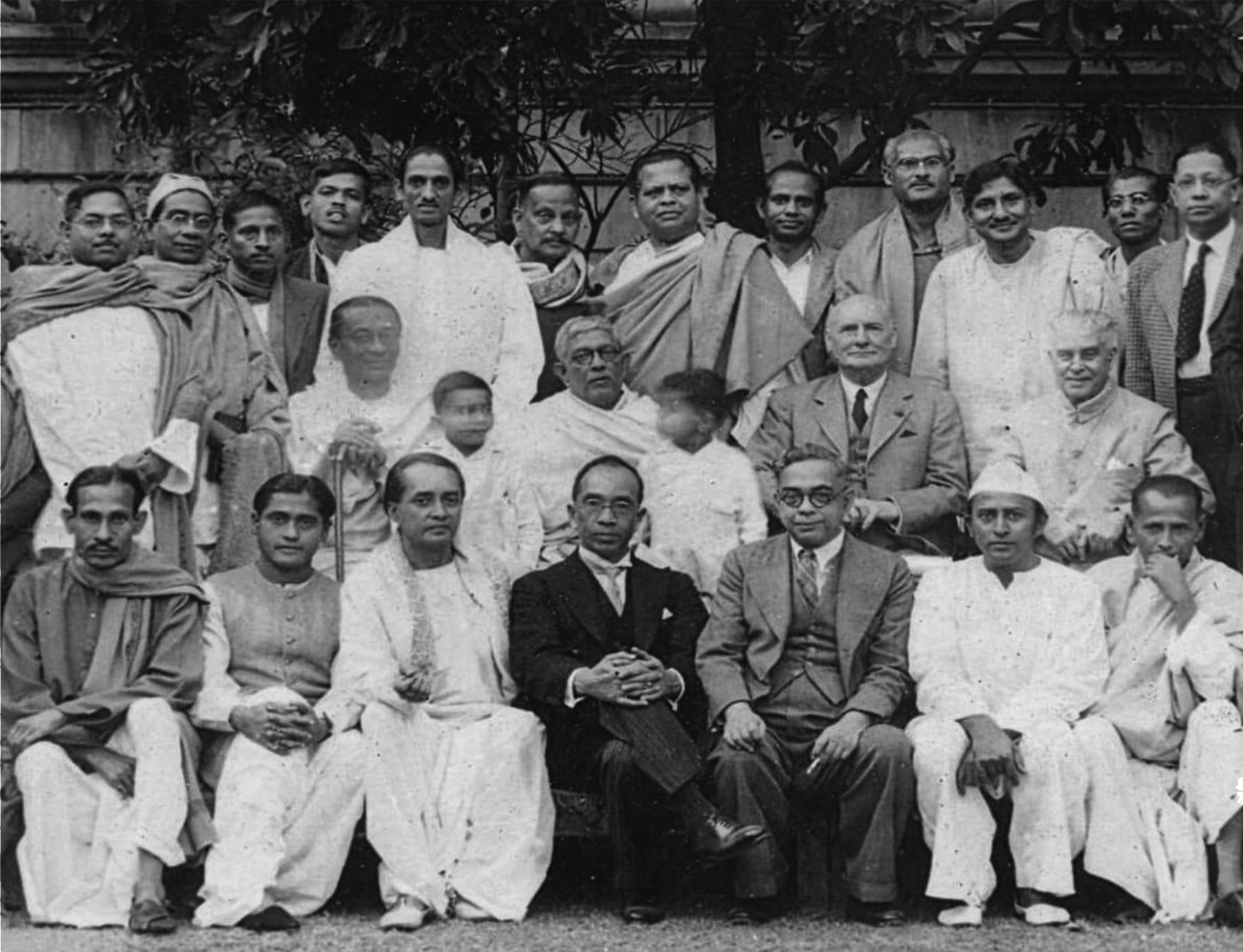
Standing third row second from right – Gobardhan Ash. Seated middle row from right second Percy Brown and third Jamini Roy. Front row from right fourth Atul Bose at the Government College of Art & Craft, 1929

Ernest Binfield Havel was the principal from 1896 to 1905. He attempted to reform teaching to emphasise Indian traditions, leading to the emergence of the style known as the Bengal school of art. Percy Brown was the next principal, who took over from the officiating Principal Abanindranath Tagore on 12 January 1909. He served as Principal up to 1927. From 15 August 1905 to 1915, Abanindranath Tagore was the Vice-Principal of the college, and worked towards developing an Indian style of Art, which gave birth to the Bengal school of art, an agenda that was to be pursued at the Kala Bhavan, Shantiniketan.

=== Mukul Dey as principal ===
On 11 July 1928, Mukul Chandra Dey became the principal. In October 1931, it started its quarterly magazine, Our Magazine, which published the reproductions of the works of its students and the faculty. Mukul Dey was the Principal of the institute till 1943.

=== Chintamoni Kar as principal ===
For a long period in the 60s and 70s, it was headed by Chintamoni Kar, who was appointed Principal on 1 August 1956.

== Department ==
=== Painting ===
- Drawing
- Portrait Making
- Life Study
- Antique Study
- Still Life
- Composition
- Mural
- Print Making
- Sketch

=== Indian painting ===
- Drawing
- Life Study
- Mural
- Composition
- Museum Study
- Nature Study
- Copy from Old Masters
- Print Making
- Sketch

=== Modelling & Sculpture ===
- Life Study
- Head Study
- Portrait
- Composition
- Moulding and Casting (Bronze and Fibreglass casting)
- Stone Carving
- Direct Plaster
- Clay Modelling
- Wood Carving
- Terracotta
- Repousse (embossing)
- Mixed Media

=== Graphic Design / Applied Art ===
- Drawing
- Sketch
- Advertising
- Print & Electronic Media
- 3-D Design
- Typography
- Out-of-Home Advertisement
- Illustration
- Print Making
- Photography
- Audio Visual Media

=== Textile Design ===
- Weaving
- Printing (Block Printing, Screen Printing and others)
- Dyeing (Tie and Dye, Batik, etc.)
- Design
- Drawing
- Life Study
- Sketch

=== Ceramic Art & Pottery ===
- Designing
- Finishing
- Glazing
- Firing
- Ceramic Mural
- Ceramic Sculpture
- Functional and Expressional Pottery Drawing

=== Design: Wood and leather ===
- Design and Execution in Wood and Leather
- Mixed Media Composition
- Water Colour
- Oil Colour
- Mixed Media
- Object Drawing
- Life Drawing
- Sketch
- Painting
- Mural
- Wooden Sculpture
- Interior Design

=== Printmaking ===
- Relief Process: Lino or Traditional Wood Surface
- Planographic: Lithography
- Intaglio: Etching
- Stencil: Silk Screen
- Computer Graphics and Digital Printing

== Alumni ==
See also: Government College of Art & Craft alumni

Notable alumni of this institute include Nandalal Bose, Jamini Roy, Kisory Roy, Lain Singh Bangdel, Hemchandra Kanungo, Atul Bose, Annada Munsi, Somnath Hore, Rajen Tarafdar, Manu Munsi, Jainul Abedin, Hemen Majumdar, Shanu Lahiri, Ganesh Pyne, Ganesh Haloi, Sunil Das, Samir Mondal, Jogen Chowdhury, Sudip Roy, Pulak Biswas, Ananta Mandal, Paresh Maity, Sanatan Dinda, Biman Bihari Das, Deep Das

== See also ==
- List of colleges affiliated to the University of Calcutta
- Education in India
- Education in West Bengal
