= Somnath Hore =

Indian artist (1921–2006)

- Born: 1921; Chittagong, British India
- Died: 2006 (aged 84–85); Santiniketan, West Bengal India
- Education: Visva-Bharati University
- Occupations: Painter, sculptor, muralist, printmaker
- Spouse: Reba Hore
- Awards: Padma Bhushan

Somnath Hore (1921–2006) was an Indian sculptor and printmaker. His sketches, sculptures and prints were a reaction to major historical crises and events of 20th century Bengal, such as the Bengal Famine of 1943 and the Tebhaga movement. He was a recipient of the Indian civilian honour of the Padma Bhushan.

== Early life ==
Somnath Hore was born in 1921 in Chittagong, now in Bangladesh. He lost his father early and was schooled with the help of his uncle. In his youth he became affiliated with the Communist Party, and his socialist ideologies influenced the early phases of his artistic career. It was through the active patronage of the Communist Party of India that Hore gained entrance to the Government Art College in Calcutta. Haren Das was then presiding over the graphics department, and Hore had the advantage of learning from him.

In 1943 he did visual documentation and reporting of the Bengal famine for the Communist Party magazine Jannayuddha (People's War). His coming of age as an artist coincided with the 1946 peasant unrest in Bengal known as the Tebhaga movement. Hore became a follower of Chittaprosad Bhattacharya, the political propagandist and printmaker.

== Career ==
Hore learned the methods and nuances of printmaking, mainly lithography and intaglio, at the Government College of Art and Craft in Calcutta. By the 1950s he was regarded as the premier printmaker in India. Hore invented and developed various printmaking techniques of his own, including his famous pulp-print technique, which he used in the critically acclaimed Wounds series of prints.

At the behest of Dinkar Kaushik, Hore came to Santiniketan to head the Graphics and Printmaking Department. Somnath lived most of his later life at Santiniketan, where he taught at Kala Bhavan, the art faculty of Visva Bharati University. There he became a close associate of the painter K.G. Subramanyan and the sculptor Ramkinkar Baij.

In the 1970s Hore also started making sculpture. His contorted bronze figurines recalled the agonies of famine and war, and became iconic emblems of modern Indian art. One of his largest sculptures, Mother and Child, which paid tribute to the sufferings of the people of Vietnam, was stolen from Kala Bhavan soon after it was finished and disappeared without a trace.

Hore died in 2006 at the age of 85. He is prominently represented in the collection of the National Gallery of Modern Art, New Delhi.

Following the death of the artist Gopal Krishna Gandhi wrote in the newspaper Telegraph, "Somnath Hore was more than an artist. He was a witness of the human drama but a witness with a skill that translated his witnessing into art. In an age when secularism, socialism and peace can be seen- or rubbished- as shibboleths, he knew them to be vital needs. In times when art can become a play-thing of drawing rooms and auction halls, he kept it close to its springs-his human sensibility."

While the reputed art historian R. Siva Kumar in the essay entitled Somnath Hore: A Reclusive Socialist and a Modernist Artist wrote, "We do not choose suffering, and we do not choose heroism. But suffering often compels us to be heroic. Somnath Hore (1921–2006) was an artist who led a quiet and heroic life. Quiet because he always kept himself away from the glare of the art world; and heroic because he chose to stand by the suffering and held steadfast to his political and thematic commitments even though he knew this meant trading a lonely path. He kept himself away from the din of art not because art was a lesser passion for him but because life mattered more and art did not stand witness to human suffering, did not mean much to him. And human suffering was for him, as a Communist, not an existential predicament, into which we are all born (or a visitation or even a tool to know god as it was for Van Gogh), but something always socially engendered." In the same essay R. Siva Kumar writes, "The famine and the sharecropper's revolt acquired an archetypal significance in Somnath Hore's vision of reality. During these years there were a host of other tragic visitations: the communal riots, the Partition, the exodus of the religious minorities and the loss of home for millions, including Somnath. But none of them found a place in his work comparable to that of the famine and the peasant revolt, which were for him symbols of human condition and aspirations of those with whom he identified."

== Style ==
In the early 1950s Hore's drawings and his Tebhaga series of woodcuts show the influence of Chinese Socialist Realism and German Expressionism. He was also influenced in his youth by the robust style of German printmaker Käthe Kollwitz and Austrian Expressionist Oskar Kokoschka. As the artist evolved, his drawings, especially his human figures, became simplified and shed details. Through this reduction he achieved his individual style of contorted and suffering figures created with a masterly use of line. His sculptures show a similar approach. In the 1970s Somnath's artistic journey culminated in his Wounds Series of paper pulp prints, where he achieved a unique brand of abstraction without sacrificing his long-practiced humanism.
