= Jogen Chowdhury =

Indian artist (1939–2026)

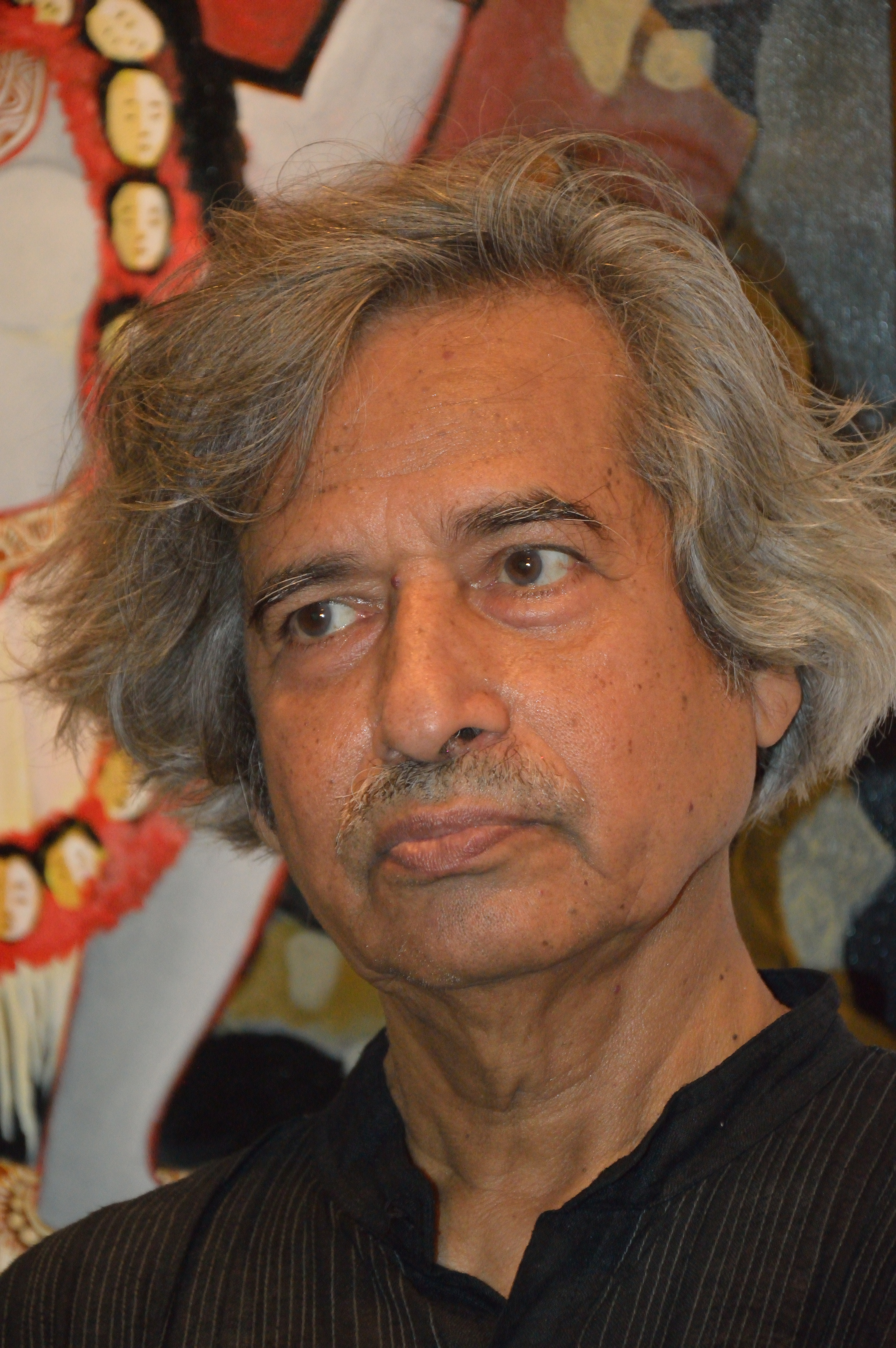
- Chowdhury in 2012

Member of Parliament, Rajya Sabha
- In office 3 April 2014 – 2 April 2020
- Constituency: West Bengal

Personal details
- Born: 15 February 1939 Faridpur, Bengal Province, British India (now Faridpur, Bangladesh)
- Died: 25 October 2026 (aged 87) Kolkata, West Bengal, India
- Party: Trinamool Congress
- Education: University of Calcutta; Government College of Art & Craft
- Occupation: Painter
- Awards: Banga Bibhushan (2012)
- Website: www.jogenchowdhury.net

Jogen Chowdhury (15 February 1939 – 25 October 2026) was an Indian painter. He used to live and work in Santiniketan. Chowdhury graduated from the Government College of Art & Craft, Kolkata and subsequently at École nationale supérieure des Beaux-Arts, Paris in 1967. He made a considerable contribution toward inspiring young artists of India. Chowdhury developed his individual style after his return from Paris. His most famous paintings are in ink, water color and pastel, though he also painted in oil medium as well.

Lines and their tactile characteristic, used to enhance colors, have been important material in Indian Art for ages. Jogen Chowdhury himself is a master of lines and he has mastered to make the curves depict the character of his figures. By careful distortion of the form he imparts the air of caricature in his figures, figures of men and women. The figure is always the most important and conveys all the artist has to express. Color, he uses though, is to provide matter into the form. R. Siva Kumar has lucidly described Jogen's works in the following excerpt: "The pulse and rhythm of Jogen Chowdhury's art comes from a filial affinity to nature and milieu. In Chowdhury's more recent works the sensory experiences of cloth, bolsters, sofas and the human body are cross-projected to produce an uncanny world of tran-substantiated tumescence and flaccidness. Mnemic displacements and personal associations add to the symbolic ambivalence of his motifs, making his images come closer to inexplicable experiences than to explicit signs. In the postures of some figures we feel an animal sentience, in the ripe anatomy of others we savour a fruity succulence. The figures are wrought by a combination of decorative wilfulness and expressive distortion and are imbued with an effusive sensuality. Chowdhury's art is rich in suggestions; it is to be apprehended without bracketing our fund of knowledge, experience or memories, but also cannot be narrativised without trivialising it, without depleting its sensory particularities."

== Life and career ==
=== Early life and education ===
Jogen Chowdhury was born on 15 February 1939, in Daharpara Village, a village in the Faridpur district of Bangladesh. His father Pramatha Nath Chowdhury was a Brahmin zamindar. Jogen received the interest on art from his parents as both his parents were artists. Pramatha Nath was interested in Hindu mythological incidents and characters. He had painted several mythological scenes from the village theatres. He had also sculpted various Hindu deities. Jogen's mother was an expert in Alpana drawings.

He was raised in a village of culture and atmosphere. Just before partition Jogen along with his father came to Calcutta; the rest of the family moved to Calcutta in 1948, after the partition. The family stayed at his uncle's quarters. Here Jogen painted his first painting, on the wall.

In 1951, Jogen's family moved to Saheednagar Colony, Dhakuria.

Chowdhury was admitted to the Government College of Art & Craft, Kolkata in 1955 wherefrom he graduated by 1960. His first job was as an art teacher in Howrah Zilla School. After two years in 1962, he was employed as Designer in the Handloom Board, Calcutta.

=== Youth ===
In 1965, he went to Paris to study in Ecole des Beaux Arts, in William Hayter's Atelier 17. Afterwards he spent five months in London.

Chowdhury returned to India in early 1968. He was appointed a textile designer in the Handloom Board in Chennai. In 1970, he joined the Calcutta Painters Group. His first collection of poems Hridoy Train Beje Othey was also published in the same year.

He quit his job at the Madras Handloom Board in 1972 to join the Art Gallery of Rashtrapati Bhavan, New Delhi as a Curator. Due to this new job, he moved to New Delhi. He founded the Gallery 26 and Artists' Forum in New Delhi in 1975 along with some leading painters of New Delhi. In 1986, Jogen represented India in the 'Festival of Art' in Baghdadwi.

=== Santiniketan ===
In 1987, Jogen Chowdhury joined Kala Bhavan, Santiniketan as professor of painting. Beside his numerous paintings, exhibitions, he has written extensively on contemporary art. He was also appointed Juror in several exhibitions.

=== Political career ===
In 2014, Chowdhury was elected as a member of Rajya Sabha from Trinamool Congress.

=== Death ===
Chowdhury died at a private hospital in Kolkata, at around 10:15 a.m. on 25 October 2026, following a 15-month battle with blood cancer. He was 87. Chowdhury had been hospitalised since 16 October, receiving treatment for complications, including an infection. Before his final rites, Chowdhury was taken to his home in South City, and then to Charubasona, a museum Chowdhury opened in 2019 to house his works created throughout his lifetime.

== Awards and honours ==
- Awarded by the Prix le France de la Jeune Peinture, Paris (1966),
- Awarded at the 2nd Biennale of Havana, Cuba (1986),
- Awarded at the International Print Biennale, Bhopal (1995),
- Honored with the prestigious Kalidas Samman by the Government of Madhya Pradesh, (2001),
- An honorary D.Litt. by Rabindra Bharati University (2010),
- Awarded by the Banga Bibhushan award by the Government of West Bengal (2012),
- Honored by the Zainul Samman (2016) by Dhaka University, Bangladesh.

== Publications ==
- The Arts of India, by Basil Grey, Phaidon (1981),
- Image and Imagination by Geeti Sen, Mapin (1996),
- Jogen Chowdhury Chitrakala (Bengali), Arun Sen (1996),
- Indian Contemporary Art: Post Independence, Vadehra Art Gallery (1997),
- Major Trends in Indian Art, Lalit Kala Akademi (1997),
- The Flamed Mosaic, Indian Contemporary Painting by Neville Neville Tuli, HEART (1997),
- Dreams 1900–2000, edited by Lynn Gamwell, Cornell University Press (2000),
- When Was Modernism, by Gaeta Kapur, Tulika (2000),
- Indian Art, by Partha Mitter, Oxford (2001),
- A Special Issue on Jogen Chowdhury (Bengali), Nandimukh Publication (2002),
- Contemporary Art of Bengal, Mapin (2003),
- Indian Art: An Overview, edited by Gayatri Sinha, Rupa & Co. (2003),
- Ten Contemporary Artists of Bengal (Bengali) Pratikshan (2003),
- Jogen Chowdhury Enigmatic Visions, published by Glenbarra Art Museum, collected works from exhibitions at Pundole Art Gallery, Mumbai, Vadehra Art Gallery, New Delhi, Chitrakoot Art Gallery, Kolkata (2006)
- Jo 2021, Published by Debovasa (September, 2021)
- Jogen Chowdhury Sketchbook 1986–87, Published by Debovasa (February, 2023)
- Jogen Chowdhury Sketchbook 1962, Published by Debovasa (March, 2023)

== Sources ==
- Retrospective exhibition of Jogen Chowdhury at National Gallery of Modern Art, Bangalore in Apr 2016
- Jogen Chowdhury Official website
