= Ganesh Haloi =

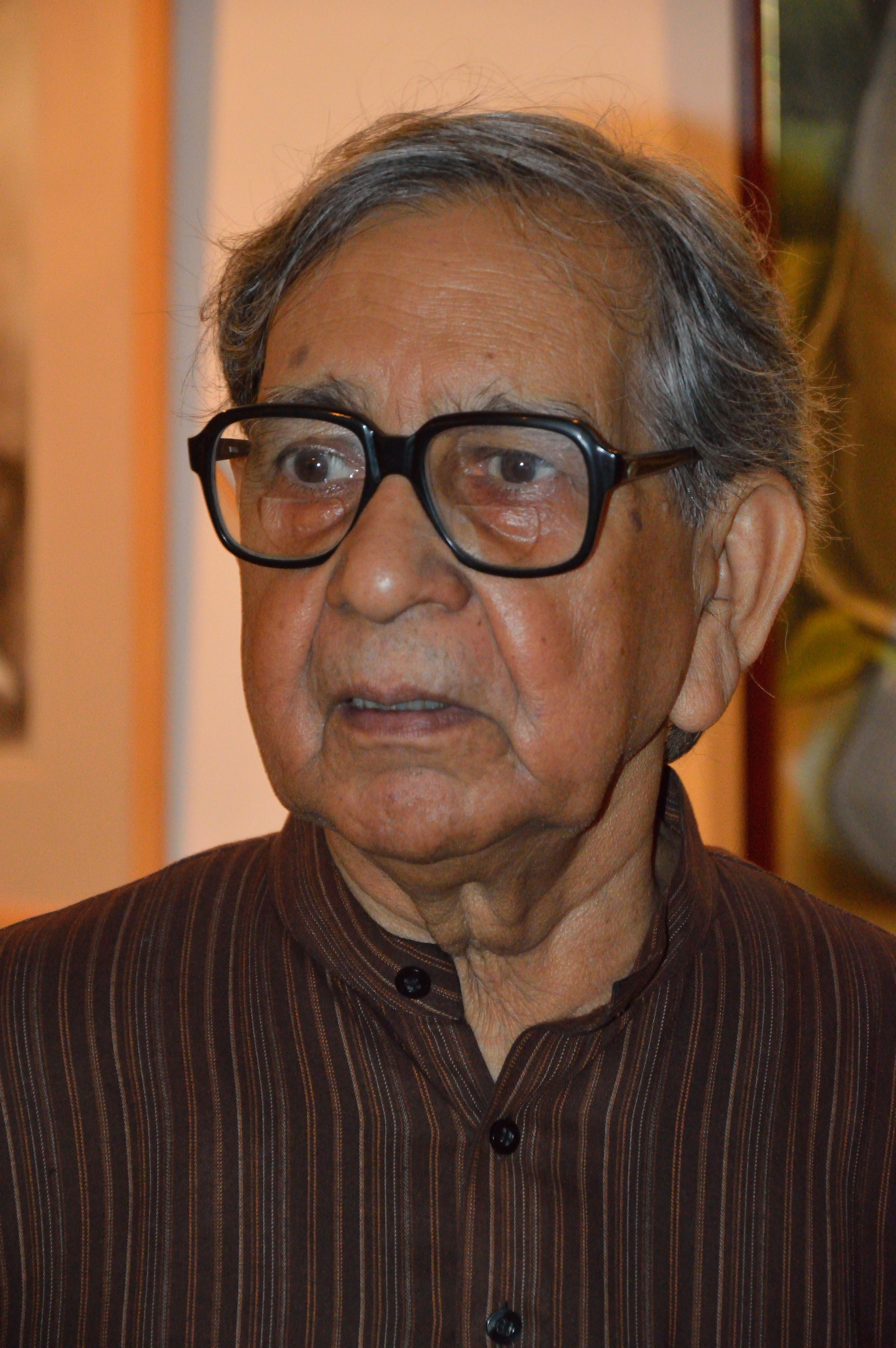
- Ganesh Haloi
- Born: 1936 (age 89–90); Jamalpur
- Known for: Visual Art

Ganesh Haloi is an India-based visual artist, curator, and author. Ganesh Haloi's art has evolved through a series of transactions from pure landscape to the innerscapes. Even though it is abstract, Haloi's works and his motifs have precise associations with the artist's psyche, his experiences and the upheavals that have shaped him and his point of view. "Everything begins in pain," says Haloi. He maintains high standards craftsmanship and his construction of tress, houses and the ambience of Kolkata that seems murky with a suppressed strength.

== Early life ==
Ganesh was born in 1936 in Jamalpur village in Mymensingh (now in Bangladesh) and spent much of his childhood. His family came to Calcutta, India in 1950 after the India-Pakistan Partition.

== Exhibitions ==
- Form and Play (Kolkata and New York)
- Documenta 14 (Athens 2016, Kassel 2017)
- Poetics of Abstraction (Kolkata January 2018)
- Art: Bengal Now (Delhi January 2020)
- Sense and Sensation: Paintings in Ink and Brush at Akar Prakar. Curatorial Advisor: Debashish Banerji (2021)
- The Architectonics of Form: Scrolls by Ganesh Haloi. Curated by Jesal Thacker at Akar Prakar, Kolkata, 2022

== Awards and recognition ==
- Manojmohan Basu Smarak Samman for his autobiography Amar Katha
