= Rathin Maitra =

Indian painter (1913–1997)

- Born: 10 July 1913; Shitlai, Pabna, British India (present day Bangladesh)
- Died: 3 July 1997 (aged 83)
- Education: Government College of Art and Craft, Calcutta
- Known for: Painting
- Parent(s): Jogendranath Maitra (father); Sarala Devi (mother)
- Relatives: Jyotirindranath Maitra (elder brother)

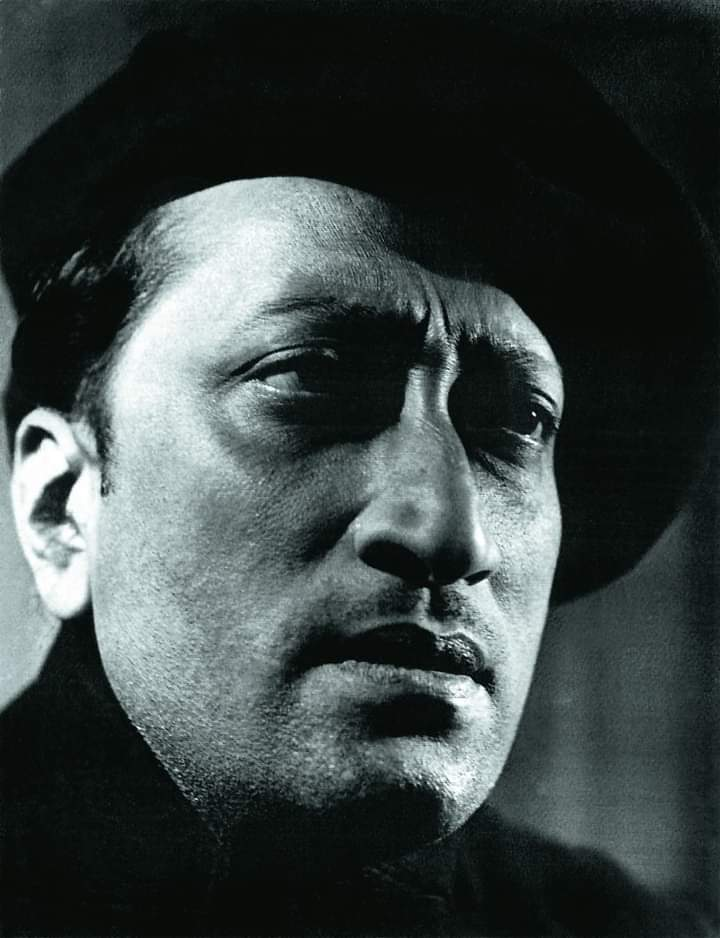
Founding Member of the Calcutta Group

Rathindranath Maitra or Rathin Maitra in short (Bengali: রথীন মৈত্র), also spelt as Rathin Moitra (10 July 1913 – 3 July 1997), was a prominent Bengali painter. He was one of the new generation of Indian modernist painters and co-founder of the Calcutta Group in 1943.

== Birth and early life ==
Rathin Maitra was born on 10 July in the year 1913 in Shitalai House, in Pabna of British India (present day Bangladesh). His father, zamindar Jogendranath Maitra, was a leader of the national movement and used to have a great interest in Hindustani classical music. His mother was Sarala Devi, the daughter of Raja Kishorilal Goswami of Serampore. Eminent orator and patriot Tulsi Charan Goswami was his maternal uncle, and poet and singer Jyotirindra Maitra was his elder brother. At the Bhawanipur Mitra Institution in Calcutta, he was trained in fine arts by Devi Prasad Roy Choudhury. After completing his matriculation in 1931, he started his education at the then Government School of Fine Arts (present day Government College of Art and Craft) in Calcutta from where he passed the final examination with distinction in 1937. Later, he came in contact with Nandalal Bose, Benode Behari Mukherjee and Ramkinkar Baij at the Kala Bhavana in Santiniketan.

== Career ==
He then travelled around India in search of Indian heritage to get an opportunity to know the social customs, manners, arts of different regions of the country. Both the Rajput paintings and the Pahari paintings influenced him a lot. At that time in 1943, during the Second World War and the Bengal famine of 1943, Subho Tagore, Nirode Mazumdar, Pradosh Dasgupta, Paritosh Sen, Gopal Ghose, Prankrishna Pal and he himself formed a fine art group called the Calcutta Group in Calcutta. During his career, he also taught at the Government College of Art and Craft in Kolkata for several years and later became the Honorary Joint Secretary of the Academy of Fine Arts, Kolkata. In 1953, he was responsible for directing the first exhibition of Indian paintings in the United States, a joint initiative of the then Government of India and the Academy of Fine Arts, Kolkata. He received the huge opportunity to visit art galleries in various European countries while there and back. During the course of that time, for notable novelist and playwright Christopher Isherwood, and renowned Indian philosopher and monk of the Ramakrishna order Swami Prabhavananda's translated version of the Bhagavad Gita into English titled Bhagavad Gita - Song of God, he designed and painted the cover. Apart from oil and watercolour, he also excelled in scale drawing. He had a reputation as an art teacher. His paintings are preserved in various art museums in India and in private collections of many individuals abroad. He was also invited by the Bombay Art Society to hold a solo show in September 1947. He also authored and illustrated books on Indian heritage, such as Temples of Garhwal and Other Landmarks.

== Death ==
Maitra died on 3 July 1997.

== Publications ==
- Temples of Garhwal and Other Landmarks (1995)
