= Subho Tagore =

Indian painter, poet, magazine editor and art collector (1912-1985)

- Born: 3 January 1912; Calcutta, Bengal Presidency, British India
- Died: 17 July 1985 (Age 73); Kolkata, India
- Known for: Painting, magazine editing
- Spouse(s): Nirmala Tagore; Aarti Tagore
- Children: Chitralekha Shubham (Daughter); Siddhartha Shubham (Son); Sundarshubham (Son)
- Parent(s): Ritendranath Tagore (Father); Aloka Devi (Mother)

Subho Tagore, full name Subhagendranath Tagore (Bengali: সুভো ঠাকুর) (January 3, 1912 – July 17, 1985), was the great-grandson of Maharshi Debendranath Tagore. He was a painter, poet, magazine editor and art collector.

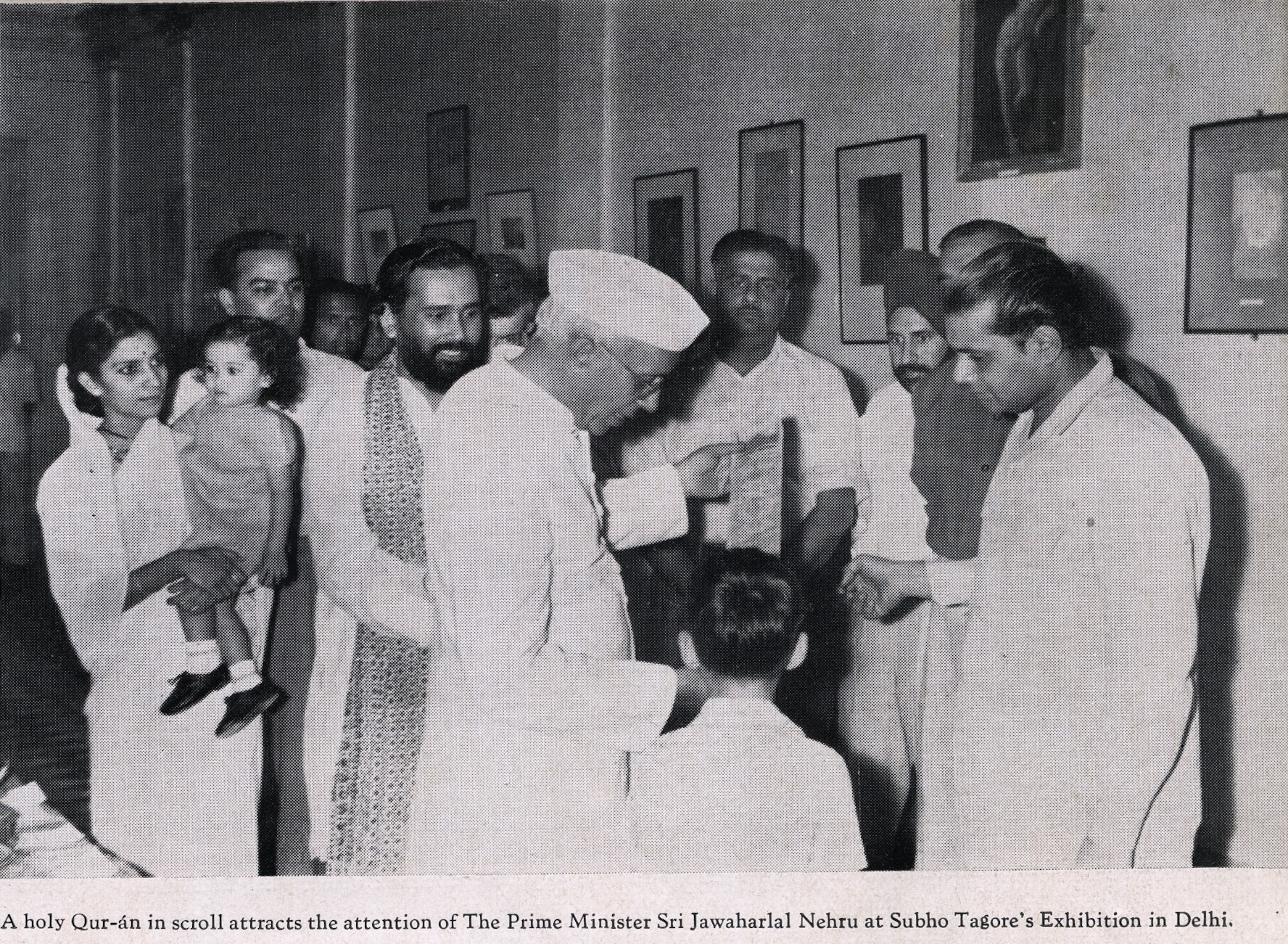
Subho Tagore with Prime Minister Jawaharlal Nehru in Delhi during Tagore's exhibition

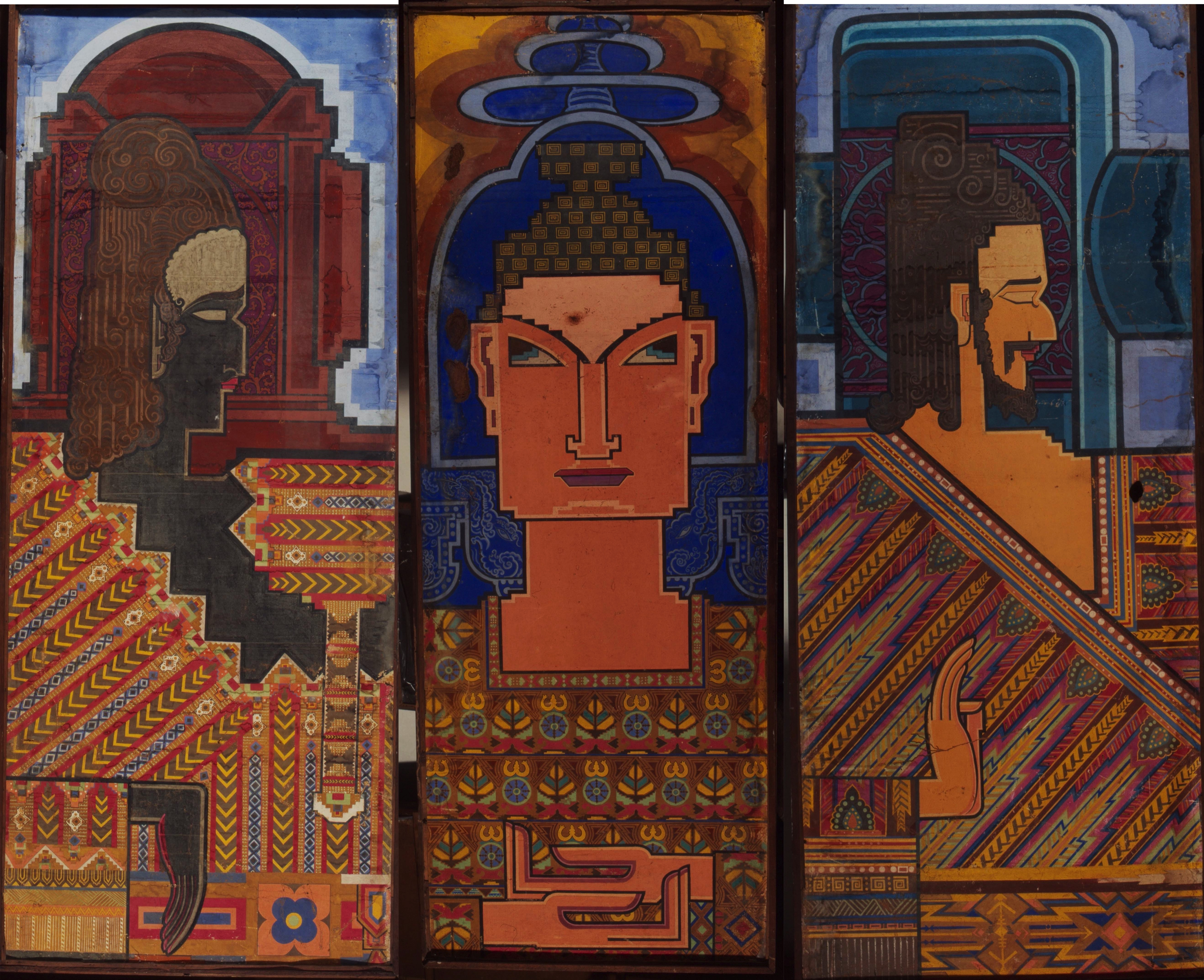
A triptych by Subho Tagore

== Birth and education ==
Subho Tagore was born on 3 January 1912 in Jorasanko Tagore family, Calcutta. However, he was a 'rebel' even though he was born in the atmosphere of fame and tradition of Tagore family. From his childhood, he rebelled against his family, against the Upanishad texts and Bhagavat-Bhajana, against the Sanatan system, and against ongoing literature and painting. The expression of his writing was as follows:

"Poet Tagore, who is yours, stay together? Heard that he is father's uncle, I am not related to him."

He had that grudge against his family all his life. He expressed a similar mood in the memoir "Bismriticharana" written in his last life. In the case, tradition-breaking distinctiveness has emerged. By naturally rebelling against the established order of the Tagore family, he became known to his relatives as the 'Kalapahar', 'Bohemian', etc. of the Thakurbari. He left Tagore family at the age of twenty-six with a share of his ancestral property. He did not regret spending several lakhs of rupees on literary pursuits, friendships and various hobbies. However, as a budding artist, he studied at the then Government Art School in Calcutta for two years and went to London to acquire artistic skills and returned after a few years.

== Art and literary works ==
He combined the styles of East and West in his painting. Nirode Mazumdar formed the Calcutta Group in 1943 with young artists such as Pradosh Dasgupta, Gopal Ghose, Paritosh Sen, Kamala Das Gupta, Rathin Maitra, Pranakrishna Pal etc., moving away from the art thinking of the Bengal School. It was he who discovered the skilled craftsman Banshichandra Sengupta in Kashmir. Four-five issues of the Chaturanga magazine were published under his editorship while studying in art college. During thirties, he edited the monthly magazine Bhavishyat (The Future) and the pictorial weekly Agragati (The Progress) with his own style of adventurous writing, pictures, designs and decorations that were novel and startling. But his best contribution in the history of periodicals is the art magazine Sundaram. He also became known as a poet. He introduced a new rhythm in poetry called Agramil Chanda. Many times he started writing by assuming himself in the third person. Attracted to handicrafts, he became a prominent collector of handicrafts. Unloved, neglected objects, pictures, statues, pots, antique furniture, lanterns, rare ink pots and pens, Mughal hookah cigarettes, cigar pipes, old maps, letters of intellectuals — he was rich in such strange collections. Due to his interest and experience in handicrafts, he was appointed by the Government of India as the Eastern Regional Director of the All India Handicrafts Board. But he could not build a museum with his personal collection. And at one time he and his art have been extensively written - in the anthology Art of Subho Tagore. Shanti Chowdhury made a biopic of him called The Lonely Pilgrim. Notable books written by Subho Tagore are-

- Mayamriga (Bengali: মায়ামৃগ)
- Nil Rakta Laal Hoye Gachhe (Bengali: নীলরক্ত লাল হয়ে গেছে)
- Alatchakra (Bengali: অলাতচক্র)
- Atandra Altamira (Bengali: অতন্দ্র আলতামিরা)
- Pansy and Piko (Bengali: প্যানসি ও পিকো)
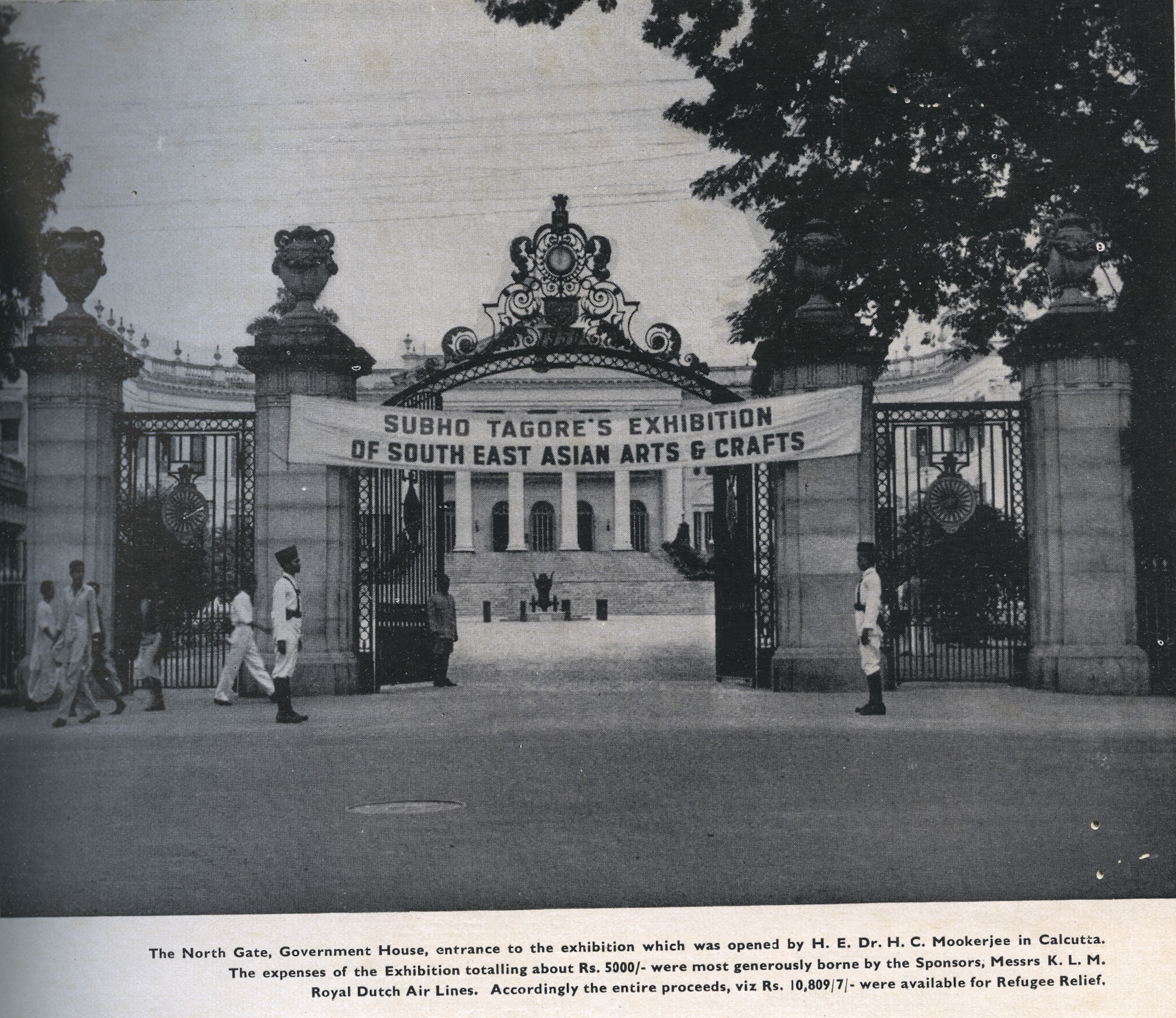
  Subho Tagore Calcutta Exhibition
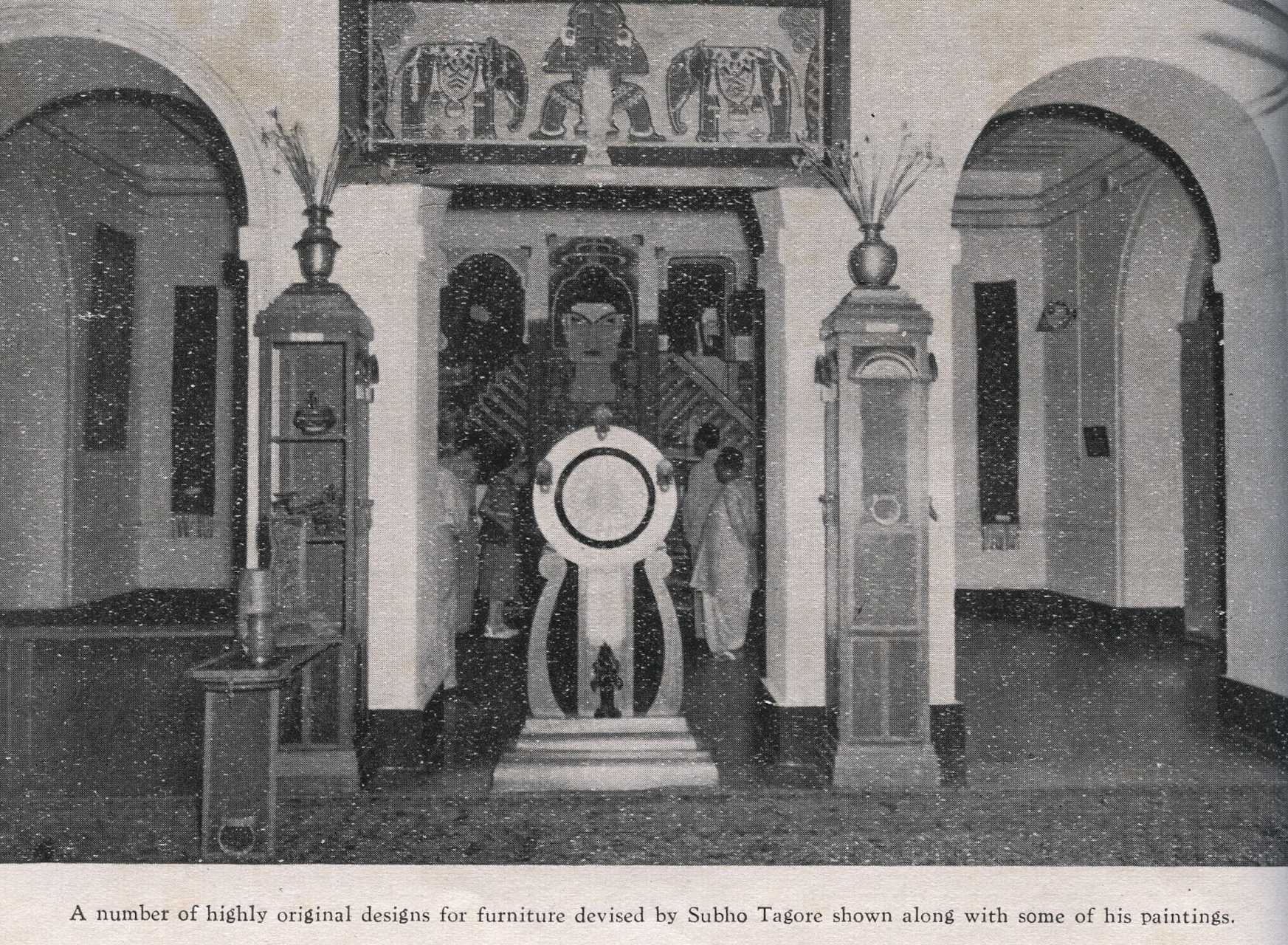
  Furniture designed by Subho Tagore

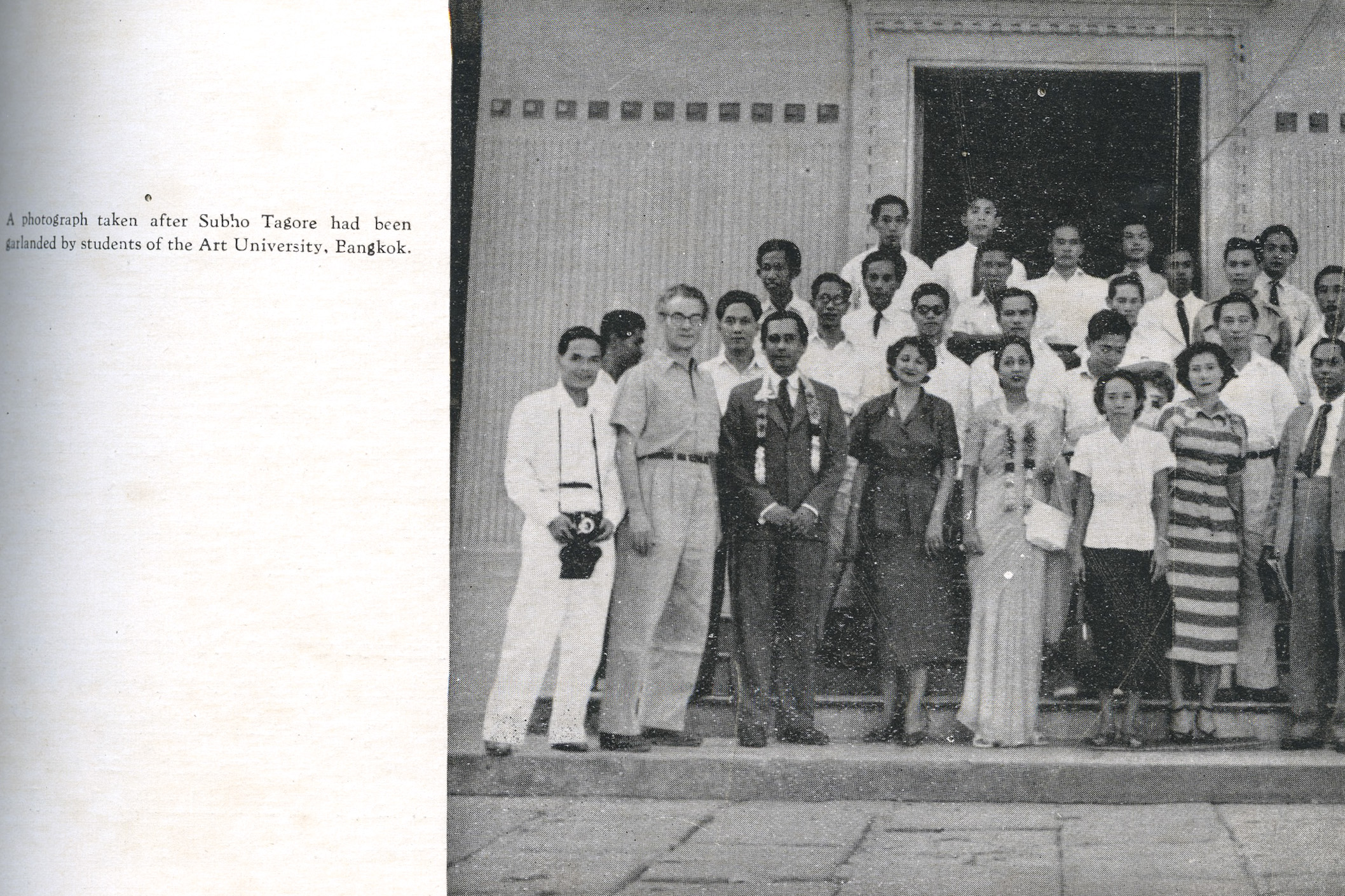
Subho Tagore during his visit to Bangkok to showcase his exhibition

== Death ==
Subho Tagore died on July 17, 1985 at the age of 73 in Kolkata.
