= Bishnu Dey =

Indian poet and academician (1909–1982)

- Born: 18 July 1909; Calcutta, Bengal Presidency, British India
- Died: 3 December 1982 (aged 73); Calcutta, West Bengal, India
- Occupations: Poet; Academician
- Honours: Jnanpith Award (1971); Sahitya Akademi Award (1965)

Bishnu Dey (July 18, 1909 – December 3, 1982) was a Bengali poet, writer, essayist, academician, art appreciator, and connoisseur in the era of modernism and post-modernism.

Modern Bengali poetry originated between the two World Wars. This period was also marked by the escalation of the Indian independence movement.

The poverty of villagers and laborers and the unseemly affluence of some opportunists made the young generation hopelessly depressed. Young poets started writing in protest, in a new style. This literary crusade was championed by Bishnu Dey, Jibanananda Das, Buddhadeb Basu, Sudhindranath Dutta, Amiya Chakravarty, and others. These pioneers created and structured contemporary Bengali poetry in the post-Rabindranath era.

Bishnu Dey was steeped in his country’s lore; he was in tune with India’s traditions even as he wrote what might be called revolutionary poetry, both in form and content. Unquestionably, his poetry dealt with fundamental events at home and beyond. He wrote about his country and its men and women who suffered grievously throughout history but somehow remained unvanquished.

India’s music—especially Indian classical music and Rabindranath’s songs—was close to Dey’s heart. He translated poems written in the Santhal, Oraon, and Chhattisgarh languages through William Archer and Verrier Elwin. And yet, he was also an aficionado of Western classical music and, through his poetry, familiarized readers with this genre, as well as Western mythology, literature, and art.

Bishnu Dey always supported progressive trends in this country. “Deeply drawn towards the social analysis of Marxism, he has achieved, in his own way, a unique mental adjustment – it has cost him much, especially the Establishment’s ire, but perhaps it has given him the sustenance which is the secret of his unceasing literary labors.” (by Hirendranath Mukherjee, book jacket of ‘In the Sun and the Rain’ by Bishnu Dey)

Dey's seminal work, Smriti Satta Bhabishyat (স্মৃতি সত্তা ভবিষ্যৎ; Memory, the Being, the Future, 1955–61, published in 1963), set a new precedent in Bengali poetry. It won him the 1965 Sahitya Akademi Award in Bengali and the highest literary award in India, the Jnanpith Award, in 1971.

Dey’s poems have been translated into English (by the poet himself and others) and into Indian languages like Hindi and Kannada.

== Biography ==
Early Life: Bishnu Dey was born in North Calcutta on July 18, 1909, the fifth of seven children of Monoharini and Abinash Chandra Dey. His father was an attorney by profession.

Although he started with Mitra Institution, Bishnu Dey completed his schooling at the Sanskrit Collegiate School in 1927.

In 1930, Dey received his Intermediate Degree from Bangabasi College, Kolkata.

From 1930-32, Dey pursued his bachelor's degree at Kolkata’s St. Paul’s College, majoring in English, with Philosophy and History. This was a turning point in Dey’s life. Thanks to his teachers, he could reach deep into Western classical music and Marxist philosophy – both remained inseparable from his existence till the end.

Dey’s literary pursuits started early, during his school days. His first story, ‘Puraner Punorjanma,’ (পুরাণের পুনর্জন্ম) was published in 1928 in Pragati (প্রগতি) magazine by Budhhadeb Basu.

Dey's stories and poems were regularly published in Pragati, Bichitra, Dhupchhaya, Kallol (প্রগতি, বিচিত্রা, ধূপছায়া, কল্লোল), and other noteworthy magazines. Many of the poems in his first and second books were written during these years.

By this time, Dey was in profound admiration of T.S. Eliot’s work. In 1928, he met Sudhindranath Dutta of Porichoy (পরিচয়) magazine, another poet with whom he could truly communicate. At his request, Dutta wrote the essay, ‘Kabyer Mukti,’ (কাব্যের মুক্তি) which appeared in the inaugural issue of Porichoy in 1931.

Dey was a regular at the Porichoy ‘adda’ (আড্ডা) – usually at Sudhindranath’s place, where he met various Bengali talents, like the artist Jamini Roy and the scientist Satyendra Nath Bose, both of whom became lifelong friends.

In 1933, Dey’s first book Urboshi O Artemis (উর্বশী ও আর্টেমিস) was published.

In 1934, he received his master’s degree from Calcutta University. So did Pranati Ray Chaudhuri, daughter of Phullonalini and Prabhat Kusum Ray Chaudhuri. Bishnu and Pranati got married the same year, on December 2, 1934. By this time, the family had moved to South Kolkata.

In July 1935, Dey joined Ripon College (now Surendranath College) as a professor of English. His eldest daughter (Ruchira) was born in September of the same year.

By now, Dey’s own home had become a renowned center of adda. Singer-composer Jyotirindra Moitra (Dey’s classmate from his university days), the poets Chanchal Chattopadhyay and Samar Sen, and many other intellectuals were regular visitors.

Dey had a personal library at home and a collection of Western classical music. Music and literature were important shared interests among the group.

1936-1950: Dey’s second book Chorabaali (চোরাবালি) was published in 1937. And though he enjoyed Ripon College—Buddhadeb Basu and Hiren Mukherjee were among the faculty—his health started deteriorating.

Dey’s second daughter (Uttara) was born in June 1938. His wife Pranati joined Kamala Girls' School as a teacher. The family shifted to 1/10 Prince Golam Mhd. Road, an address that would subsequently be well-frequented by Kolkata’s intelligentsia for decades to come.

Bishnu Dey continued to translate T.S. Eliot with great enthusiasm. He published his third book Purbolekh (পূর্বলেখ) in 1941.

On March 28, 1942, the Progressive Writers’ Front was converted into the Anti-Fascist Writers' and Artists' Association with the full support of all writers and intellectuals. Bishnu Dey and poet Subhash Mukhopadhyay were part of the organizing committee.

While WW2 ravaged the world, many students and teachers of Ripon College fled Calcutta, fearing air raids. At the end of 1942, the college administration decided to shift the college away from Kolkata. Dey was also asked to transfer there. He resigned and had to work as a private tutor to make ends meet.

From June to September 1943, Dey also worked at Prasanta Chandra Mahalanobis’s statistical lab at Presidency College. A third child, son (Jishnu), was born in February 1943.

That was the year of the Bengal Famine – millions fled from villages to the city only to die of starvation. The Calcutta Group artists (for whom Dey was an inspiration and constant support) portrayed the suffering through paintings; IPTA utilized the stage; Jyotirindra Moitra composed his famous ‘Nabojibaner Gaan.’ Bishnu Dey was intimately involved in all these movements.

In 1944, Dey was employed by the Bengal Government Education Department and posted in the English Department of Presidency College; in 1947, he was transferred to Central Calcutta College (now known as Maulana Azad College). He retired from this college in 1969.

The independence of India came at a terrible price. Bengal was partitioned into East Bengal, (later East Pakistan, now Bangladesh) and West Bengal. The nation of Pakistan was formed in the West. Inter-religious riots broke out in these areas. Mass migration began. Also, the Tebhaga Movement (the peasants’ revolt) started in the winter of 1946.

Bishnu Dey was acutely distressed by these events. Shaatbhai Champa (সাত ভাই চম্পা) and Sandwiper Chawr (সন্দ্বীপের চর) were written during these troubled times.

Dey believed in the independence of artists and writers from any Marxist dogma. In February 1947, he translated an article on the autonomy of artists by the French Marxist Roger Garaudy. National Marxists were furious. Dey was alienated by both the Marxists and his non-Marxist associates. But some old friends and young admirers stood by him.

In 1948, Dey started Sahitya Pawtro (সাহিত্য পত্র) – a new magazine with Chanchal Chattopadhyay as the editor. Dey published his articles and poems and requested Jibanananda Das, Buddhadeb Basu, Sudhindranath Dutt, and others to help make it a literary success.

Healing also came by way of getting out of Kolkata. In 1945, Dey’s close friend from the Calcutta Group, artist Nirode Mazumdar, invited the family to Rikhia, a village in the Santhal Parganas (now in Jharkhand). The natural beauty of the place made Dey’s artistic soul flourish. He even painted—albeit for a short time—Rikhia landscapes as if to illustrate his poetry. Rikhia was always his sanctum and, later, his home.

1950 onwards: Anwishta (অন্বিষ্ট), a collection of poems started in 1946, was published in 1950.

Dey welcomed a new generation of poets. The ‘1/10 adda’ sessions featured scholars, litterateurs, musicians, artists, filmmakers, actors, and scientists.

Dey sought out and visited folk artists like Balai Pal and folk art collectors like Hirendra Nath Mitra and Kamal Kumar Majumdar. David McCutchion, an authority on Bengal’s terracotta temples, was a frequent visitor.

Despite several invitations from abroad, Dey never ventured out of India, but the world did arrive at his doorstep to appreciate his work and knowledge. During WW2, many British and American soldiers stationed in Kolkata were interested in Indian art and culture and visited Dey; some became lifelong friends. Over the years, literary figures like E. M. Forster and Pablo Neruda visited him at 1/10.

In the 2011 documentary on Bishnu Dey by Debabrata Roy, the narrator quotes the poet Samar Sen: "An internationalist, Bishnu Dey never went abroad, declining numerous invitations and allurements and one never saw him in western clothes. A near-perfect Bengali in manner, his knowledge of the world was enviable."

He is the grandfather of Rukmini Dey, a mathematical physicist at ICTS-TIFR.

== Death ==
After his wife Pranati retired in 1971, they moved to Rikhia, where Dey continued writing. However, due to the lack of medical facilities, they were forced to return to Kolkata, where, after a prolonged illness, Bishnu Dey died on December 3, 1982.

== Publications ==
Poetry: Urboshi O Artemis (1933) • Chorabaali (1937) • Purbolekh (1941) • Baishe June (1942) merged to Shaatbhai Champa (1945) • Sandwiper Chawr (1947) • Anwishta (1950) • Naam Rekhechhi Komal Gandhar (1953) • Alekhya (1958) • Tumi Shudhu Ponchishe Boisakh (1958) • Smriti Satta Bhabishyat (1963) • Shei Andhokar Chaai (1966) • Sambad Muloto Kabyo (1969) • Itihashe Tragic Ullashe (1970) • Ishabashyo Dibanisha (1970) • Rabi Korojjol Nijodeshe (1973) • Chitraroop Matto Prithibir (1975) • Uttore Thako Mouno (1977) • Aamaar Hridoye Bancho (1981)

Collected Poems: Bishnu Dey-r Shreshtha Kobita (1955) • Ekush Baish (1965) • Rushoti Panchashoti (1967) • Bochhor Pnochish (1974) • Kobita Samogro Vol. 1 (1989), Vol. 2 (1990), Vol. 3 (1995) • Kobita Samogro (2015, omnibus)

Translations: Caramel Doll (1946, with Pranati Dey, ‘Kheerer Putul’ by Abanindranath Thakur) • Samudrer Mouno (1946, ‘Le Silence de la mer’ by ‘Vercors’) • Eliot-r Kobita (1953, 1960, 1969) • Hey Bideshee Phul (1956, collection of translated poems.) • Mao Tse-tung (1958, 18 poems) • Africa-y Asia-y Muralee Mridonge Turje (1970, mainly from modern African poems) • Selected Poems (1972, Bishnu Dey’s poems translated by the poet and others) • History’s Tragic Exultation (1973, Bishnu Dey’s poems, translated by the poet) • Tumi Rabe ki Bideshinee (1986, extended and edited version of Hey Bideshee Phul)

Essays: The Art of Jamini Roy (1944, with John Irwin) • Introducing Nirode Mazumdar (1946) • Ruchi O Pragati (1946) • Sahityer Bhabishyat (1952) • The Paintings of Rabindranath Tagore (1958) • India and Modern Art (1959) • Sahityer Desh Bidesh (1962) • Satyendranath Bose: A Legend in his Lifetime (1964) • Rabindranath O Shilpsahitye Adhunikatar Samashya (1966) • In The Sun and the Rain: Essays on Aesthetics (1972) • Speech of Sri Bishnu Dey, the Award-winner (1973) • Janasadharaner Ruchi (1975) • Jamini Roy (1977) • Sekal Theke Ekal (1980) • Chharano Ei Jiban (Memoir: This Scattered Life; transcribed and published in Ananda Bazar Patrika; included in Kobita Samogro) • Collection of essays published by Dey’s Publishing in two volumes

== Ideology ==
Bishnu Dey was inspired by Marxist philosophy. He was a founder member of the Anti-Fascist Writers' and Artists' Association in 1942.

As a poet, he was inspired and excited by the ideas and style of T.S. Eliot. Dey was an exhaustive reader of world literature. But it was Rabindranath's work that remained unparalleled for him.

== Accolades ==
- Sahitya Akademi Award (1965)
- Jnanpith Award (1971)
- Soviet Land Award for Rushoti Panchashati
