= Chittrovanu Mazumdar =

Indian artist (born 1956)

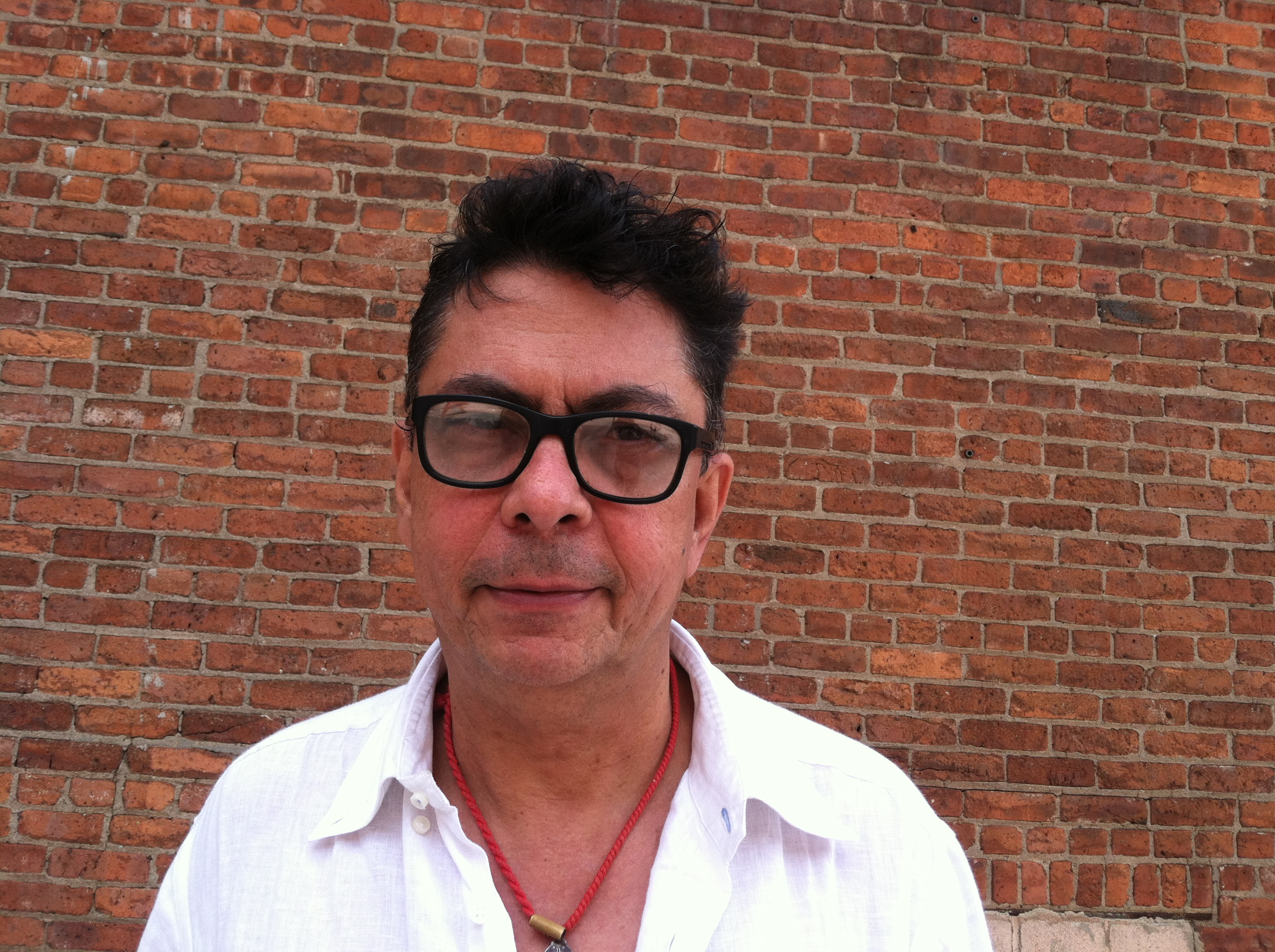
- Born: 13 October 1956 (age 69); Paris, France
- Known for: Multimedia Installation Art, Conceptual Art, Painting
- Notable work: "New Work" "... and undated: Nightskin" "And what is left unsaid ..."
- Style: Eclectic; Expressionist

Chittrovanu Mazumdar (born 13 October 1956) is a contemporary Indian artist of Bengali-Indian and French descent. Mazumdar has been described as a "conceptual artist" and a "post-structuralist" while some critics consider it difficult to classify his oeuvre into a single artistic tradition or even into any consistent genre of his own. Mazudmar has referred to himself as an "expressionist painter" but has also said he generally prefers not to use "a particular word to qualify" his work because it comprises different kinds of media and forms, and that art is more interesting when fully given over to the viewer's own experience rather than constrained by the prescriptive power of labels.

Born in Paris, Mazumder spent most of his childhood in Kolkata and in a remote area in rural Jharkhand. He received his initial art education from his father, the renowned Indian Modernist painter Nirode Mazumdar (1916 –1982) and later, at the Calcutta Government College of Art & Craft. He first rose to prominence as a painter in the 1980s and 1990s and transitioned to installation work in the mid to late 1990s. He has often collaborated with Seagull Publications to design books and with Kolkata-based theater groups to design performance spaces. As of January 2015, he lives and works primarily in Kolkata and is associated with the 1X1 Gallery in Dubai. Major exhibitions of his work have been presented in Dubai, Kolkata, London, Mumbai, New Delhi, New York, Palo Alto, Paris, Rome, Singapore and Salzburg, among other places. His paintings are housed in the National Gallery of Modern Art in New Delhi and in several private collections internationally.

== Early life and education ==
Chittrovanu Mazumdar was born into a racially and culturally mixed family of artists and scholars. His mother Marguerite Mazumdar was French and his father, Nirode Mazumdar, a stalwart of 20th Century Indian Modern art and a founding member of the Calcutta Group, was Bengali Indian. Noted painter and art educator Shanu Lahiri and renowned Bengali novelist Kamal Kumar Majumdar were his paternal aunt and uncle, respectively.

Mazumdar was born in Paris, but spent the bulk of his childhood in Kolkata and in a tiny village in Jharkhand (then part of Bihar). He grew up in a trilingual household and read extensively in all three of his native languages (Bengali, French, and English). The eclectic nature of his cultural and intellectual heritage has significantly informed his work later in life. Poet and art critic Ranjit Hoskote has written that Mazumdar "has served his apprenticeship to the grand tradition of European painting; equally, he has addressed the ingeniously achieved modernism in Santiniketan as well as the Calcutta Group."

Until he was about 12 years old, when he attended the Patha Bhavan School in Kolkata, Mazumdar was sent to a village school held in a little bamboo hut because his "father thought it would be good for [him]". He later studied art at the Calcutta Government College of Art & Craft, graduating at the top of his class in 1981. Prior to attending art college, he was taught by his father, whom he also cites as a significant creative influence.

== Work ==
Mazumdar began his professional life as a painter. His first solo show was presented in Kolkata in 1985 at the Academy of Fine Arts by Seagull Foundation for the Arts, which went on to present a dozen solo exhibitions by him throughout India over the next decade and a half. In 1991 he became the third artist in history to be invited to present at the Durbar Hall at Victoria Memorial in Kolkata. During this period, he also established his international reputation through major group exhibitions in Asia, Europe, the UAE and the United States. His first solo exhibit outside of India was presented in New York at the Bose Pacia Modern Gallery in 1997.

Since then, Mazumdar's work has been shown in twelve solo exhibitions and thirteen group exhibitions in India and abroad. In 2004, Seagull Foundation for the Arts presented his sprawling, multi-sensory installed environment New Work in an abandoned apartment building in a crowded Kolkata neighbourhood. In 2009, 1x1 Art Gallery of Dubai presented another ambitious project, the critically acclaimed undated: Nightskin. In 2012, Nightskin, which had been specifically tailored to its exhibit space, was adapted for and recreated in a space that comprised Mazudar's Kolkata studio at Ho Chi Minh Sarani and extended into the Harrington Street Arts Centre located on a floor above the studio in the same building (the new iteration of the work was titled ...and undated: Nightskin). In the summer of 2014, his expansive three month solo exhibit And what is left unsaid… was held in the Museum of Contemporary Art of Rome (commonly known as "MACRO").

Chittrovanu Mazumdar's work

=== Form and style ===
Mazumdar's paintings are sometimes created on very large canvases and the visual elements are often constructed in layers, creating the effect of being visible and shrouded at the same time. Fragmented images, collaged text and pictures, mythical iconography, abstracted and literal figuration are all built on top of each other, crowding together, yet appearing to be on separate planes of "translucent and opaque paint".

In the early to mid 1990s, although still largely focused on painting, Mazumdar was experimenting with different technologies and the use of three dimensional spaces. He collaborated on designing theater spaces, where he developed some of his technique and ideas for using sound, lighting, moving parts, digital media, and also the architectural elements, contours and traversable spaces of the exhibition venue itself.

Since the late 1990s, Mazumdar has worked mostly in multimedia installations. He has continued to produce a large number of discrete paintings, but these are usually incorporated into the larger entity of the exhibition as a whole. In some shows, he has taken groups of multiple paintings (displayed in a traditional gallery-space configuration) as well as the entire room containing the display, and turned these into components of the larger installation.

Mazumdar's installations employ a wide range of technologies and materials. He has used painted canvas and paper, poured industrial tar, mercury coated cups, aluminum reflectors, rubber, wood, wax, engine oil, brocaded textile, masonry, gold, iron, steel, motorized and mechanical devices, light bulbs, filtered light, video, CGI, soundtracks (including recognizable strands of music and recited poetry as well as human screams, traffic sounds, and jumbled noises), and massive freestanding structures such as metal towers with embedded digital content. In part because of the variety, Mazumdar's works have tended to defy categories. They are usually loosely characterized as installations or sculpted environments, but the artist himself refrains from attaching any single label to them. He says "there are paintings, sculptures, sound and light installations. Each piece tends to cross over to a new field, forcing the viewer to shift his/her position constantly."

== Critical reception ==
Business Standard calls him "one of the foremost artists of his generation." Celebrated painter M. F. Hussain, who once described Mazumdar as one of India's "most dynamic younger artists," later said of his work "underlying his many shifts in medium, form and style over the years is a sensual intensity that reaches past the clever and the quick to probe deep layers of the human experience in all its tragi-comic universality – archetype, myth, memory, desire, betrayal, longing, ecstasy, pain."

Poet and art critic Ranjit Hoskote says Mazumdar's work inspires "a visual and conceptual excitement – a heightened, even epiphanic extension of the senses… now rarely felt in exhibitions of contemporary art. In sacrificing conceptual depth for surface flamboyance, in confusing truism with idea, in mistaking fashion for formal progress, many younger Indian artists have lost their way in a labyrinth where each forked path leads to discovery or a dead end. Mazumdar, by contrast, has never lost sight of the vital connection between reflection and practice, self-expression and self-critique; he values hesitancy, the creative rupture of one’s own certitude, over the reckless speed of unmediated production."

Soumitra Das of The Telegraph found the 2012 installation … and undated: Nightskin to be "matured and transformed into an aesthetic realization of his ideas of transience, mutability and of night being the matrix of creativity" in comparison to his earlier works from the 1990s, which Das found to be "gimmicky" in their use of "giant canvases… electric lights and other theatrical props."

Reviewing Mazumdar's Installation New Work (Kolkata, 2004), writer Aveek Sen wrote that "the work teeters on the verge of great clichés…. But then, "how clear is the line that separates great clichés of art from its great themes?"

== Notable works ==
=== undated: Nightskin ===
...and Undated: Nightskin, Kolkata, 2012"

Mazumdar's seminal work undated: Nightskin, debuted in Dubai in 2009 and was adapted and recreated as …and undated: Nightskin in Kolkata in 2012. The original Dubai installation was presented in a large warehouse and used the exhibition space and the surrounding desert landscape as elements of the work. The Kolkata edition was housed in Mazudar's studio at Ho Chi Minh Sarani and extended into the Harrington Street Arts Centre located on a floor above the studio.

The exhibition stretched across two floors and included photographs, multimedia installations, tall towers (some of which were covered in lush, textured layers made of fabric), oils leaking out of boxes, and projections of video, light, and sound. One reviewer described a "crate smok[ing] like an overheated engine which might catch fire at any moment, but close inspection reveals the smoke as vapour." One room had stark white walls on which were hung a series of prints titled "One Square Kilometre" showing the decomposing carcass of a calf, photographed over a period of five days. Another room contained "large screens on which streams a restless flow of images and sound, interspersed with text." There was also a large, dark, vaulted chamber, which was intermittently illuminated with sudden flashes of rotating, coloured beams of light. In this chamber were "looming black metal towers and huge, squat black metal boxes. Moutned on wheels, yet unmoving." Video images showed burning fires, flowing waters, a sleeping girl, "banks of flowers" in brilliant hues, some primary colours, some metallic. A soundtrack with layers of indistinct words, music, and muffled noises was heard. There were aperture-like mechanical components, opening and closing, smoke, viscous liquids seeping out of boxes, and partially open windows "containing small, digital prints of natural, organic textures and materials – body parts or flowers of soil."

Nightskin constructed various spaces of "night", including images of large, twilight landscapes and intimate, trancelike moments of half-sleep. It evoked images that were alternatively comforting (like a "womb" or a "boudoir") and suffocating (like looking "down through bars at videos of people, as if they are trapped"). British historian and journalist, Lucian Harris, wrote that the work captured the moment of transition from day to night when the "equilibrium of light and dark dissolves all matter before it is recast in the skin of the night" and contemplated the "many layered mysteries of the night" that are allowed to emerge once the harsh world of daylight has been left behind "like a snake, lithe and glistening as it sheds the brittle corset of its dying scales."

The project was widely praised for its technical and methodological achievement. Soumitra Das of The Telegraph wrote "Mazumdar could not have created this daedal overlay of optic and aural sensations by simply wishing it would happen. It is obvious that meticulous planning went into it." Das speculated about the time and effort required to paint, sculpt, photograph, arrange the music, and other such usual types of creative work, but also for "hanging at least a hundred framed pictures from the ceiling, rigging up a panel encrusted with the tiny bells of a ghunghru that start jangling in unison from time to time, putting together and installing those sinister, tall black 'cupboards' on wheels... punctuated with 'windows' embedded with... images, and making sure that the louvres open up and close to reveal just enough of the videos with the regularity of the respiratory system."

In an interview to The Statesman, Mazumdar said that Nightskin took almost five years to complete.

Nightskin raises questions about the self, memory, conventions of art, and the significance of artists. According to Harris, it interrogates various ways of perceiving reality. Everything is highly evocative and also seems to exist in a literal and representational way, but on closer inspection, nothing is quite what it seems. The images and even the physical objects and substances (flowers, smoke, some unidentified "viscous liquid") reveal themselves to be something quite different.

Harris also writes that "Revelation is a particularly pervasive theme of Mazumdar’s installation. Hinged doors conceal imbedded video screens, still photographs and paintings, opening up like medieval icons. Throughout the whole arrangement is the invitation to explore, to touch, to get beneath the skin and peel away the layers, the process every bit as charged as what is uncovered. Soon we are absorbed in the motifs that guide us through Mazumdar’s subconscious mind, mapping his memories with reference to whole panoply of senses."

Pranabranjan Ray sums up his experience of Nightskin as one of "awe and wonder...inspired by the scale of the constructions, and ...the ingenious yet unobtrusive nature of the constructions." Ray says "the language Mazumdar constructs is not for the generation of meaning, but for the evocation of feelings, both physiological and psychological. This makes Mazumdar a romantic artist, in the best sense of the term, although his process of realisation is deceptively postmodern. The sensation-boggling experience of the trip and the overwhelming perceptual after-effects defy categorisation."

=== The River ===
Mazumdar's installation "the River" was displayed as part of the Kochi-Muziris Biennale exhibition of contemporary art in Kochi, Kerala, during the 2016 edition. The program was curated by Artist Sudarshan Shetty, whose vision for the edition was to present works that "create multiple, layered worlds and urge viewers to move between them".

The River (nicknamed "River of Ideas" by the exhibition), is a multi-room exhibit at the Aspinwall House, which features a series of journeys for the viewer, starting with a black metal tunnel "made dangerous with hanging, exposed wires," according to one reviewer, and, in the center of it, a bridge over simulated fires made of incandescent light bulbs. There are rooms with video projections of water, leaves and "decay" on the floor as well as a video of the river Ganga flowing inside of a book.

The work was "inspired by mythical accounts of India as the land of seven rivers" and expresses in a new way, the elements of motion, transition, transience, and memory that are often present in Mazumdar's art. In discussing the beginnings of the project, he describes a conversation with curator Sudarshan Shetty, wherein the two of them spoke about the ancient river Saraswati, which is no longer extant but lives on in myth and in memory. Mazumdar says The River "raises questions about how you perceive time and culture and the passing of a moment". He describes "water as a space of transition." The thing about a river, he says, is that "once it’s gone, its gone forever; you never get back the same water".

== Exhibitions ==
=== Selected solo exhibitions ===
- 2017 'Undated Nightskin." Mana Contemporary Gallery, Jersey City, New Jersey.
- 2014 'And what is left unsaid….’ Museum of Contemporary Art of Rome (MACRO), Curated by Paola Ugolini.
- 2012 Parcours St German, Paris curated by Anne-Pierre d'Albis, presented by 1x1 Art Gallery
- 2012 '... and undated: Nightskin', The Harrington Street Arts Centre, Kolkata presented by 1 × 1 Art Gallery, Dubai
- 2010 'Ancient Earth', Apparao Galleries, Chennai in association with 1x1 Art Gallery, Dubai
- 2009 'undated: Nightskin', 1x1 Art Gallery, Dubai
- 2006 'Various', Royal Academy of Arts, London presented by Gallerie 88, Kolkata
- 2005 Bodhi Art, New Delhi
- 2004 'New Work', Seagull Foundation for the Arts, Kolkata
- 1997 Bose Pacia Modern, New York
- 1997 'Recent Works', presented by Seagull Foundation for the Arts (SFA), Kolkata at Jehangir art Gallery, Mumbai and Sumukha Art Gallery, Bangalore
- 1997 'Works on Paper', Seagull Foundation for the Arts (SFA), Kolkata
- 1994 'Recent Works', organised by Seagull Foundation for the Arts (SFA), Kolkata at Lalit Kala Akademi, New Delhi, Jehangir Art Gallery, Mumbai and Lalit Kala Academy, Chennai (with Apparao Art Gallery, Chennai)
- 1991 Presented by Seagull and Victoria Memorial Board of Trustees, Kolkata at Victoria Memorial Durbar Hall and Sukh Sagar, Kolkata
- 1989 'Recent Works', Presented by Seagull Foundation, Kolkata at Jehangir Art Gallery, Mumbai
- 1989 'Untitled', presented by Seagull Foundation, Kolkata and The Birla Academy at Birla Academy of Art and Culture, Kolkata
- 1985 'Recent Works', presented by Seagull Foundation at Academy of Fine Arts, Kolkata

=== Selected group exhibitions ===
- 2016 'the River', presented as "River of Ideas", in the 2016 Kochi-Muziris Biennale exhibition, curated by Sudarshan Shetty.
- 2012 The Indian Parallax or the Doubling of Happiness curated by Shaheen Mirali, Birla Academy of Art and Culture, Kolkata
- 2012 Video Wednesdays II curated by Gayatri Sinha, Gallery Espace, New Delhi
- 2012 'Reconstructing (White) 3', The Loft, Mumbai
- 2012 'Terrestrial Bodies', 1 × 1 Art Gallery, Dubai
- 2011 'Love is a 4 Letter Word', Latitude 28, New Delhi
- 2011 'The Intuitive: Logic Revisited', from the Osians Collection at The World Economic Forum, Davos, Switzerland
- 2011 'Art Stage Singapore', Singapore presented by 1 × 1 Gallery, Dubai
- 2011 'A Material Difference', Paradox, Singapore
- 2010 'The Evolution of the Species', Institute of Contemporary Indian Art (ICIA), Mumbai
- 2010 'Size Matters or Does it?', Part 1 at Latitude 28, New Delhi
- 2010 'Summer Show 2010', Centre of International Modern Art (CIMA), Kolkata
- 2009 Project at Inda Art Summit, New Delhi presented by 1 × 1 Art Gallery, Dubai
- 2009 'Video Wednesday', Gallery Espace, New Delhi
- 2009 'Elemente Zeit', 1 × 1 Art Gallery, Dubai and Hause Chelsea, Isle of Sylt, Germany
- 2009 'Recycled', Bose Pacia, Kolkata
- 2009 'Re-Claim/ Re-Cite/ Re-Cycle', presented by Latitude 28 at Travancore Art Gallery, New Delhi; Bose Pacia, Kolkata
- 2008 Presented by 1x1 Art Gallery at Art Paris, Abu Dhabi
- 2008 'November', 1x1 Contemporary, Al Quoz, Dubai
- 2006 'Altered Realities', Aicon Gallery, Palo Alto
- 2006 'The New Space', 1 × 1 Art Gallery, Dubai
- 2005 'Alchemy', Art Musings, Mumbai
- 2005 Gallery Sanskriti, Kolkata
- 2005 'Change of Address', The Guild, Mumbai
- 2004 'Sacred Space', organised by RPG at Academy of Art and Jehangir Art Gallery, Mumbai
- 2004 'Metallic', Palette Art Gallery, New Delhi
- 2003 'Generation Next', Saffron Art and Guild Art Gallery, Mumbai
- 2003 RPG Collection of Contemporary Bengal Art at the National Gallery of Modern Art (NGMA), Mumbai
- 2003 'Of Memories, Dreams, Reveries', Anant Art Gallery, New Delhi
- 2002 'Words and Images', organised by Guild Art Gallery at the National Gallery of Modern Art (NGMA), Mumbai
- 2001 Saffron Art and Apparao Galleries, Los Angeles
- 2001 'The Human Factor', Guild Art Gallery, Mumbai
- 1998-89 'The Search Within: Art Between Implosion and Explosion', Kloster Pernegg, Geras and Bildunshau St. Virgil, Salzburg, Austria
- 1998 'The Search Within: Art Between Implosion and Explosion', National Gallery of Modern Art (NGMA), New Delhi and Mumbai
- 1993 'Trends and Images', Inaugural Exhibition of Centre of International Modern Art (CIMA) Kolkata
- 1993 'Shraddha', rehabilitation for the mentally ill on Indian streets, Mumbai
- 1993 'Wounds', in protest against communal violence, Centre of International Modern Art (CIMA), Kolkata
- 1990 'In celebration of the Calcutta Tercentenary', organised by Birla Academy for Art and Culture, Kolkata
- 1989 on the theme of Human Rights, by the artists of Bengal. Organised by the Alliance Francaise, Kolkata, at the Birla Academy of Art and Culture, Kolkata
- 1988 Exhibition for the African National Congress on the occasion of Nelson Mandela's 70th birthday. Presented by Seagull at Calcutta Information Centre, Kolkata
- 1988 Calcutta Salon d'Automne
- 1988 Paris Salon d’Artistes Franqaise

=== Art fairs ===
- 2012 Gwanju Art Fair in association with Latitude 28, New Delhi 2011: India Art Summit, 1x1 Art Gallery, New Delhi
- 2012 India Art Fair, New Delhi presented by 1x1 Art Gallery, Dubai
- 2011 Art Stage Singapore, 1x1 Art Gallery, Singapore
- 2009 Contemporary Istanbul, 1x1 Art Gallery, Istanbul
- 2009 Abu Dhabi Art, 1x1 Art Gallery, Abu Dhabi
- 2009 Solo project at India Art Summit, New Delhi, 1x1 Art Gallery
- 2009 Solo project Art Expo India, Mumbai, 1x1 Art Gallery
- 2009 Untitled, Video longue, India Art Summit, New Delhi
- 2008 Art Paris, 1x1 Art Gallery, Abu Dhabi

== Miscellaneous ==
Mazumdar is frequently involved in publishing experiments and theatre design. He has also been active in art workshops such as Khoj (New Delhi) and Frac Payes de la Loire (France). Mazumdar takes an active interest in animal welfare. He and his wife have a number of rescued dogs that they care for in their home.
