= Prodosh Dasgupta =

Indian Bengali sculptor (1912–1991)

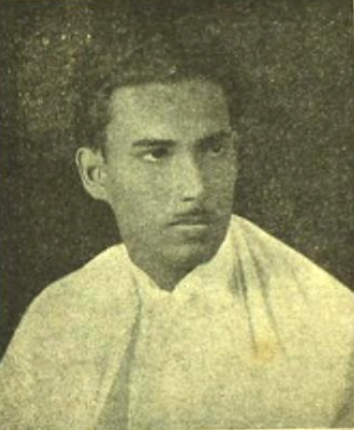
- Born: 10 January 1912; Bharakar, Bikrampur-Dhaka, British India
- Died: 29 July 1991 (aged 79); Delhi
- Known for: Sculpting
- Title: FRSA
- Children: Prabuddha Dasgupta

Prodosh Dasgupta (January 10, 1912 – July 29, 1991) was a prominent Indian Bengali sculptor of the 1940s. He was one of those who combined the philosophy of Indian classical sculpture with the geometry of modern Western sculpture to create unique works of art. At that time he and a few others formed the Calcutta Group which later played an important role in the evolution of art in India and Bengal. Due to his multifaceted talents, he has also made important contributions as a poet, writer, art critic and teacher.

== Birth and education ==
Dasgupta was born on January 10, 1912, in Bharakar, Bikrampur-Dhaka, present-day Bangladesh, in British India. Father Nalininath Dasgupta was a District Judge. That's why he spent a lot of his school life in Krishnanagar, Bengal being a student at Krishnagar Collegiate School. After graduating from Calcutta University in 1932, he studied sculpture for two years at Lucknow School of Arts under Hiranmoy Roychaudhuri. During his stay in Lucknow, he also took training in Hindustani classical music from Shrikrishna Narayan Ratanjankar. From 1934, he was under the tutelage of D. P. Roy Choudhury at the Madras Art and Crafts School for three years. In 1937, he went to study sculpture from there, first at the London Royal Academy and later Paris.

== Career ==
Dasgupta came back to India in 1940 and set up his own studio in Calcutta and started working. In 1943, he formed the Calcutta Group, an organization of young artists in Calcutta, and was its secretary from its inception till 1953. In 1950, he joined the University of Baroda as a professor in the Department of Sculpture. However, he started teaching at Government College of Art and Craft in Kolkata in the following year. In 1955, he was elected a Fellow of the 'Royal Society of Arts' in England. From 1957 to 1970, he was the director of the National Gallery of Modern Art in Delhi. He has travelled abroad many times to give lectures or exhibit his sculptures. In 1960, he was the president of the Vienna Conference.

== Notable works ==
His own aesthetic consciousness was developed in the context of the Indian independence movement and the social and political conditions of the time, in literary and musical thought, in the context of East and West. At the mature stage, he worked on various forms in many experiments. Many manifestations of his sculptures with spherical, cylindrical, conical or elliptical forms have been observed in his exhibitions. For example-

- In Bondage (1943)
- Jai Hind (1948)
- Genesis (1971)
- Egg Bride (1973)
- Sun Voysipassarra (1975)
- Sunflower (1978)
- Philosopher (1984)

Netaji's statue at the south-east of the Raj Bhavan at Dharmatala in Kolkata, West Bengal was sculpted by him. The then Prime Minister of India Lal Bahadur Shastri unveiled the statue on 23 December 1965. He also designed the full-size white stone statue of Acharya Prafulla Chandra Ray in College Square, Kolkata.

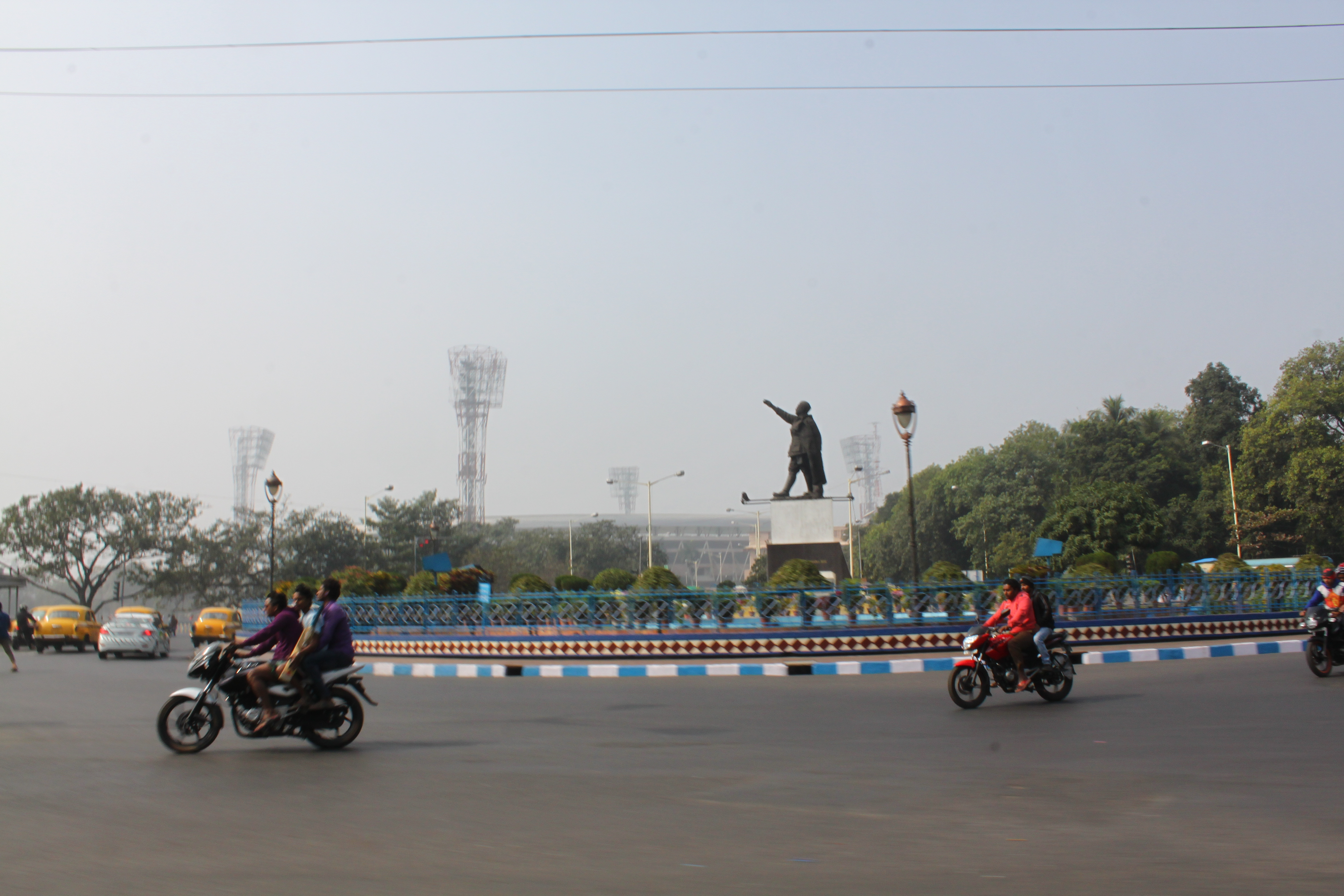
Netaji Subhash Chandra Bose Statue by Dasgupta near Esplanade, Kolkata

== Literary works ==
The books written by Dasgupta are –

- Fallen Leaves and Other Poems (1969)
- Temple Terracottas of Bengal (1971)
- Sculpture (1945)
- My Sculpture (1955)
- Memoirs of art
- In search of models

== Demise ==
Dasgupta died on 29 July in 1991 in Delhi.
