= Shanu Lahiri =

Indian painter (1928–2013)

- Born: Shanu Mazumdar; 23 January 1928; Kolkata, British Raj
- Died: 1 February 2013 (aged 85); Kolkata, India
- Education: Government College of Art & Craft, Kolkata. Académie Julian & École du Louvre, Paris
- Occupations: Painter, art educator
- Known for: Public art and graffiti art in Kolkata

Shanu Lahiri (23 January 1928 – 1 February 2013) was a painter and art educator from Kolkata. She was one of Kolkata's most prominent public artists, often called "the city's First Lady of Public Art", undertaking extensive graffiti art drives across Kolkata to beautify the city and hide aggressive political sloganeering. Her paintings are housed in the Salar Jung Museum and the National Gallery of Modern Art.

== Early life and education ==
Shanu Lahiri was born on 23 January 1928 in Calcutta (now Kolkata) into one of Calcutta's most prominent artistic families-the Mazumdar family of seven siblings. Her mother, Renukamoyee Mazumdar, though unlettered, practised calligraphy at night. Lahiri had two older brothers, the noted litterateur and writer Kamal Kumar Majumdar and artist Nirode Mazumdar, one of the Greats of 20th century modernism, now largely forgotten and a founder member of The Calcutta Group. Growing up in this atmosphere of intense creativity she was equally influenced by her mother's culinary skills. She recalls in her memoirs-

"Not far away Niru-da is busy doing a wash of a big painting he has just finished. As for dada, the eldest of our siblings, he is forever scribbling away. That was how it always was throughout my childhood...all of it flowing into my veins, forming my very being. I did not realise then what it was that I was witnessing and absorbing as a matter of course."

As a student of the Government College of Art & Craft, Calcutta, she belonged to one of the earliest batches of female students who entered on the year of the nation's Independence and studied under Atul Bose & Ramendranath Chakraborty during her first two years. In her third year she studied under professor Basanta Ganguly, a valiant representative of conservative, if not academic traditions in art. At the art college she was drilled into being a technically adept draftsman, following the curriculum set by the British colonial system, however was at loggerheads with Basanta Ganguly on many occasions as she would recall years later in a candid interview. She graduated in 1951 and was the first student of the college to receive the AIFACS President's gold medal for her outstanding contributions in art while being an undergraduate. In 1955 she daringly took on the challenge to hold a solo exhibition at the AIFACS gallery. It was here, where she found herself exhibiting her works opposite two senior masters from Bombay, Gaitonde and Gade.

In 1956 she received a French Government Scholarship, which enabled her to study in Paris for a period of two years between 1956 and 1958. She studied at the École du Louvre where she learnt art history and art-appreciation and at the Académie Julian she learnt painting. This international exposure enabled her to break free from the strictures of Academic training and the lingering stereotype of 'Indian-style' painting that prevailed amongst most Indian artists.

== Style and career ==
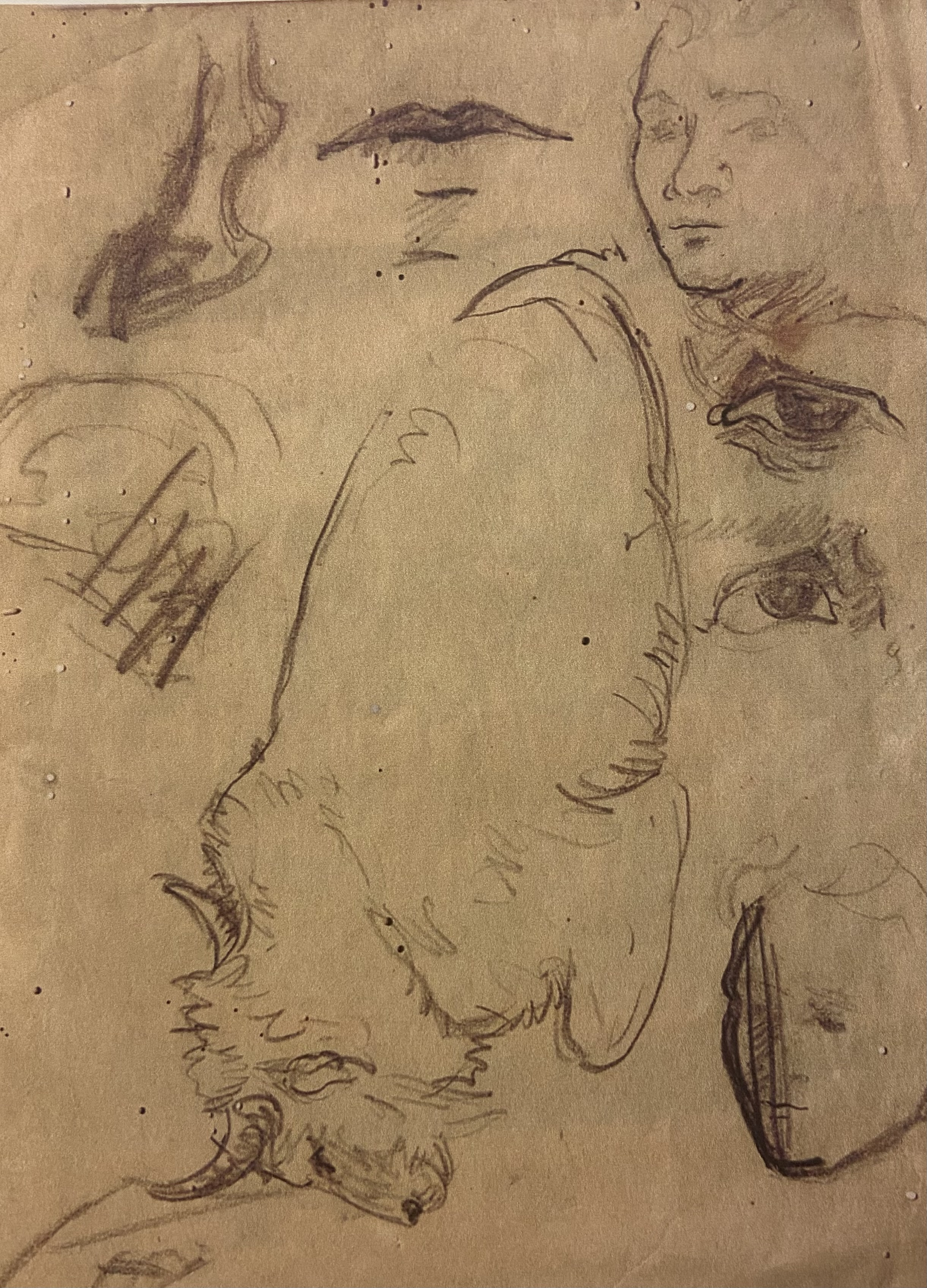
An early academic drawing by Shanu Lahiri from 1947.

Shanu Lahiri entered her artistic career in the heady years of India's Independence. Breaking away from her initial academic training was crucial to making the new modernist art which infused the influence and inspirations of international art movements. It was fully in keeping with the period's main artistic trends that she moved from her training and in Paris she actively embraced the legacy of the French High Modern.

Embracing the vocabularies of contemporary European modernism as the key idioms of her practice, like many of her generation, Paris was the Mecca of Modernism-the artistic repertoires of Picasso, Matisse, Chagall and Rousseau had remained cognizable reference points for her own innovations with form, colour and content-which left a lasting impact on her. From this rich, historical repertoire of art emerged her own trademark style which she was known for- a particular mode of contorted human figuration, a flourish of bold lines and brushwork and raw bright colours with a flair for magnitude and scale. From the 1980s, one arresting feature of her oeuvre was her predilection for vast sizes and scale, as her work began to unfurl, mural-like over stretches of canvas or paper where she moved from densely narrative and illustrative compositions to a growing simplification and economy of forms addressing social issues. The human figure remained her forte, with figures expanding from her signature portrait heads in quiet repose to an animated array of animals. Her first exhibition of paintings took place in 1950 which was followed by a string of exhibitions.

On her return from Paris, she held a string of painting exhibitions both in India and abroad. Following her academic career in the West, in the late 1970s, she joined the faculty of the Rabindra Bharati University as a reader in the visual arts department; later she became dean of its faculty of visual arts. While at the university, she initiated the practice of analyzing and copying Rabindranath Tagore's work as an exercise to delve deeper into his style as in the West one copied Old Masters as part of classroom activity, for which she received strong criticism. The decade of the 80's was dominated by the increasingly public profile of Shanu Lahiri, as an educationist, organiser and art-activist. The decade now saw the artist engaged in a public role. Following the practice of artists creating the image of goddess Durga at Bakulbagan which started in 1975 by Nirode Mazumdar, Shanu Lahiri designed the Durga idol twice for Bakulbagan, following the lead of other artists who each year created modern and stylistic idioms to work within a clay-modelled image of the goddess.

In the last two decades, the 1990s and 2000s, her studio had been a place of continued inventiveness and innovations. Retaining her primary commitment to painting and drawing, she tested new mediums and surfaces, experimenting in different phases with enamel painting on acrylic sheets, painting on wooden and ceramic plates, etchings on X-ray plates and "torch light" drawings on bromide paper. A parallel rising urge for sculpture had seen her move from small clay models and perfume bottle figures cast in bronze.

Through her art, Shanu Lahiri addressed the contemporary realities of society. She was recognised for her highly individualistic style and became a leading artist on Kolkata's contemporary art scene, along with fellow painter Karuna Shaha.

== "The Group" ==
Following the formation of the "Calcutta Group" in 1943, a tendency to get organised in groups emerged among artists in different pockets of India. In 1944 the "Progressive Painters Association" was formed under the guidance of K.C.S. Paniker in Madras, the Progressive Artists' Group came into being in Bombay in 1947, "Delhi Shilpi Chakra" was established in 1949. So without doubt the "Calcutta Group" was the pioneer of these efforts its forming artists' collectives which paved the way for others to follow. However, women were often excluded from these men's clubs. In 1983, Calcutta and to an extent, the country witnessed the mobilization of the first group of women artists: "The Group" as they called themselves, consisted of five members - Karuna Shaha, Shanu Lahiri, Meera Mukherjee, Santosh Rohatgi and Shyamasree Basu. Such an organization of women easily became the target of much implicit scorn and condescension in contemporary art circles. The artists, however remained resolute, most clear-cut and unequivocal about the necessity for such a forum of women artists. Women had for long been obscured in their profession, echoing what Virginia Woolf once stated- "For most of history, anonymous was a woman." So it was in that very identity that the artists would have to fight for equal participation and the right to be taken seriously in the art world. Since its inception in 1983, The Group exhibited annually every year at The Academy of Fine Arts. In 1986 and 1987, the exhibitions travelled for the first time outside of Calcutta, to the Triveni Kala Sangam in New Delhi and The Jehangir Art Gallery in Bombay. Such wider exposure was crucial for the artists. Despite holding exhibitions at regular intervals, with hardly any sales was disappointing. This is where a different approach to marketing and promotional activity would have helped, enabling a greater degree of engagement with more modern and avant-garde art trends.

== Book and publication ==
While at Rabindra Bharati University as the Dean of the Visual Arts Faculty, Shanu Lahiri got to see first hand the works of Rabindranath Tagore. She often said that when she read a poem by Tagore she saw images, but on viewing his paintings she never felt a lyrical feeling. This shortcoming experienced by her led her to write on the art of Rabindranath Tagore, which culminated into the book 'Rabindra Chitra Chetana'-which offers a critical insight into the art and visual vocabulary of Tagore.

She released her autobiography, Smritir Collage (A Collage of Memories) in 2001 which speaks of her childhood & upbringing in an intensely artistic and culturally elevated family. To coincide with the launch she also held an exhibition showcasing the work of her brothers Kamal and Nirode Mazumdar, and other members of her Mazumdar clan, nephew Chittrovanu, and niece Oditi. She had also written a series of short stories and anecdotes revolving around the many animals that surrounded herself and her family which was compiled as 'Edo Goli Theke Beni Madhav'.

It was impossible for anyone who had gone to meet Shanu Lahiri would leave unfed. Whether it was fixing salads quickly or preparing elaborate meals, she was known to be an experimenter in the kitchen also. A book titled Tabled by her daughter Damayanti Lahiri and designed by her nephew Chittrovanu Mazumdar was launched after her death and consists of a collection of her recipes, paintings, scribbles, and doodles-

"Ma wielded both brush and ladle with ease and enthusiasm and effortlessly dipped into her crucible of cumin and cobalt blue. 'Tabled' has been conceived largely out of the persistent demands for my mother's recipes from satiated diners and was a work in progress for her, almost till she died. It is a free flowing anecdotal installation, compiled in no particular direction-an assemblage of illustrations, photos, quirks, recipes and minor narratives.".

She was also a published poet under the pseudonym Hasna Banu.

== Public art projects ==
"In 1984, I gathered some students from La Martiniere and told them that I shall give them 50 rupees per day if they come out and paint with me. We selected a public wall and started painting on it. We didn't erase the political jargons but turned the wall into our canvas. People were curious at first and then appreciative".

— Shanu Lahiri

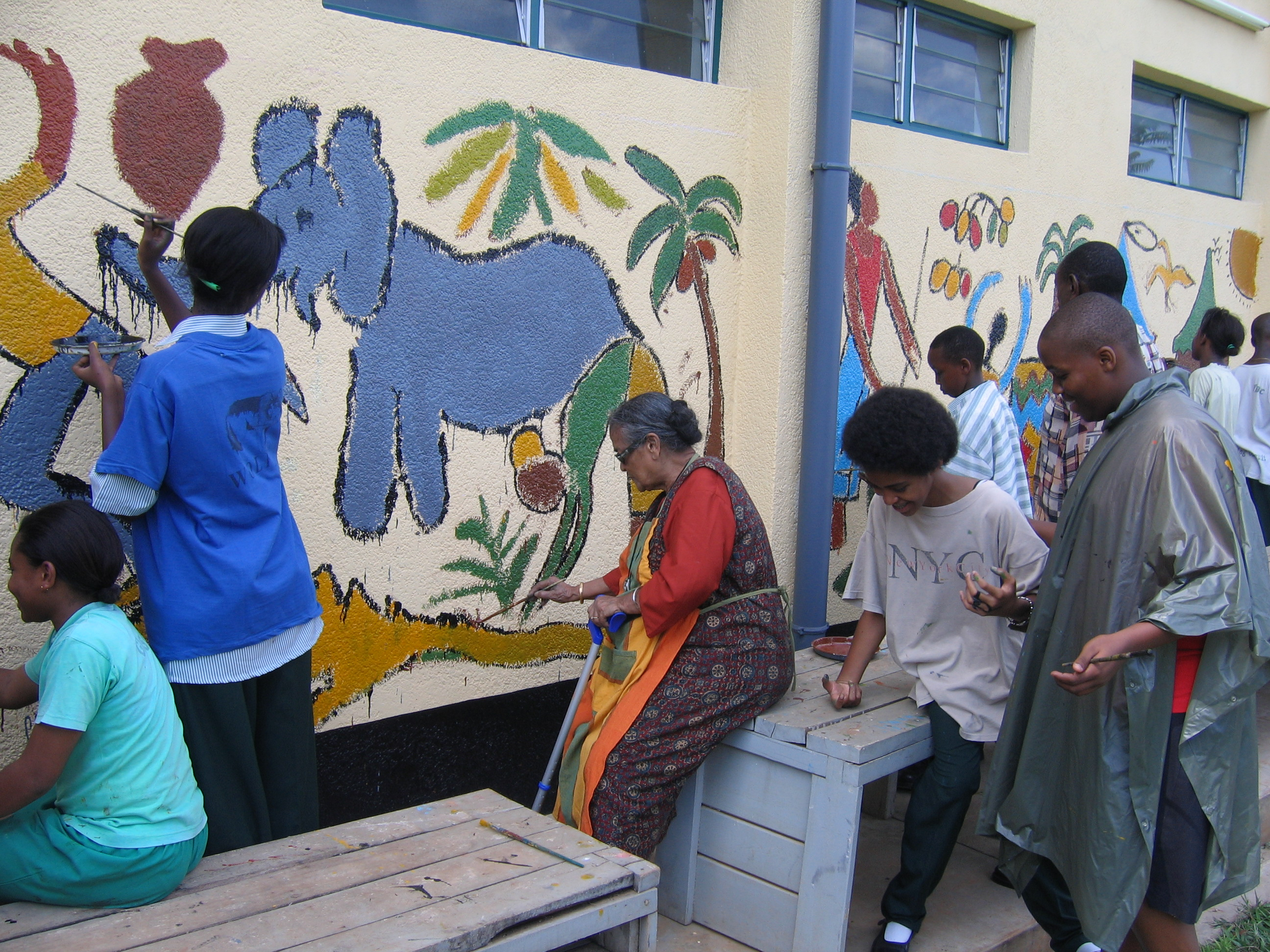
Shanu Lahiri painting a mural in Rwanda.

Lahiri was also involved in public art and graffiti art projects throughout Kolkata. Beginning in the 1980s, through her 'Love Calcutta Project' she encouraged street children and students to paint on the walls of Kolkata in an effort to beautify the city. The previous decade had been a politically tumultuous one due to the Naxalite movement, which left the city's walls covered with political posters, slogans, and aggressive graffiti. In 1984 Lahiri gathered students of La Martiniere Calcutta to paint over their school wall with colourful art and murals. Gradually this movement caught on, and in the coming years she was involved in similar public art projects in various parts of the city such as Jadu Babu's Bazaar in the Bhowanipore area, the fish market at Sreebhumi, Fort William, and other areas in north and south Calcutta. Inspired by the folk dolls of Bengal, she created a statue of Parama on the Kolkata Bypass.

In the 1980s she moved to the Lake Town neighbourhood, where she formed a local group known as bhavana. This group engaged in garbage clean-up drives and also painted neighbourhood walls with graffiti art. Lahiri had her own food stall at the local Durga Puja annual fete, selling kebabs.

The fact that today hardly any of her murals survive or have been allowed to fade due to sheer neglect or her iconic sculpture like ‘Parama’, which had become an icon of the city and was synonymous with the artist was torn down-is a comment on the apathy and callousness of the public culture of the city. She had also lent her hand with jatra, stage and theatre design with companies like- Pangea World Theatre, Notto Company, Manjusri Chaki Dance Company, Music of the Drums amongst others.

== Final years and legacy ==
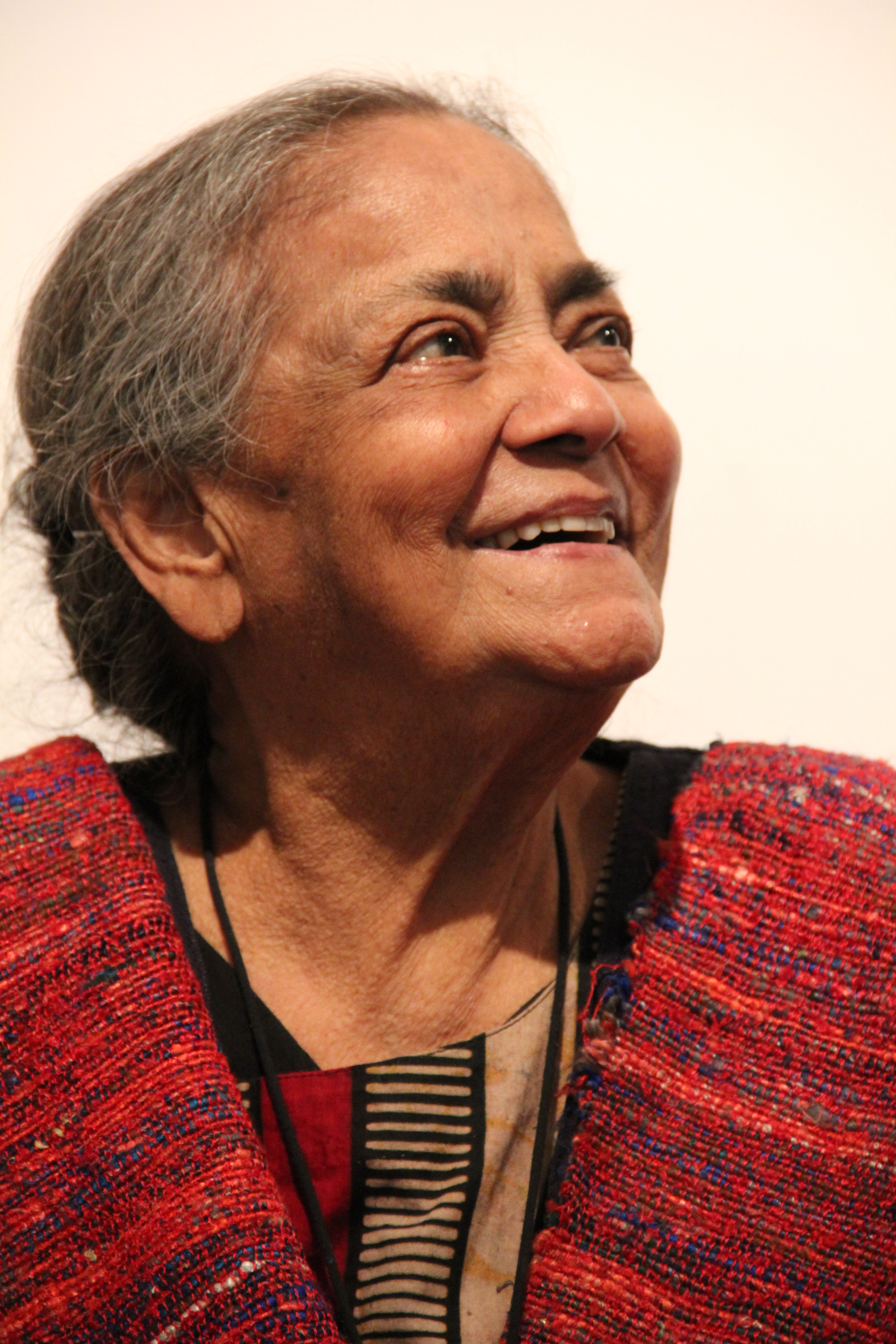
Shanu Lahiri.

Lahiri was active in public art projects into her eighties. In 2010 she organised a project in Hyderabad, bringing together students from various schools, HIV-positive children, and disabled children, to paint over the walls of the Lakshman Bagh temple as part of Rabindranath Tagore's 150th anniversary celebrations. By 2010, 25 years after she first painted them, some of her public art and mural was still visible, including a 220 feet (67 m) length of wall on the Justice Chandra Madhav Road in Kolkata.

Lahiri died in Kolkata on 1 February 2013. She donated her eyes, and was cremated at Keoratola crematorium. She was survived by her son, Arnab and her daughter, Damayanti.

Lahiri continued to work on large-scale canvases throughout her later career. While she was part of the first generation of women to enter Indian art schools in the 1940s—a period marked by women's increasing presence in the public artistic sphere—she has often been excluded from the established national canon of Indian modern art.

Art historians have noted that the traditional narrative of Indian art history often focuses on a small group of "top-tier" artists, which may result in a lack of recognition for contemporaries like Lahiri. This disparity in visibility is often attributed to systemic issues within the Indian art ecosystem, including limited academic research, underdeveloped institutional support, and a lack of accessible archival material in museums. Consequently, despite her prolific output and role in the mid-century modern movement, Lahiri remained largely outside the primary national mainstream circuit.

== Awards ==
- 1951-won the AIFACS President Award for the first prize in oils.
- 1974-received the Governor of West Bengal's best award.
- 1996- received the award from The Lalit Kala Akademi, New Delhi.
- 1999- selected as 'Shatabdir Kanya' (Woman of the Millennium) by Naba Pratisruti and in the following year she was selected as the 'Woman of the Millennium' by Biswa Bangla Sammelan. The Nivedita Puraskar was conferred on her the same year.
- 2000-2013 President of India's Nominee, Selection Committee, University of Hyderabad.
- 2002-received the Bharat Nirman Award.
- 2003-Rabindra Bharati University conferred upon her a D.Litt. for her immense contributions to the visual arts.
- 2005- Lifetime Award from the Street Exhibition Forum & the Michael Madhusudan Award.
- 2008-The Calcutta Chamber of Commerce Foundation presented her with the Prabha Khaitan Puraskar.

== Works ==
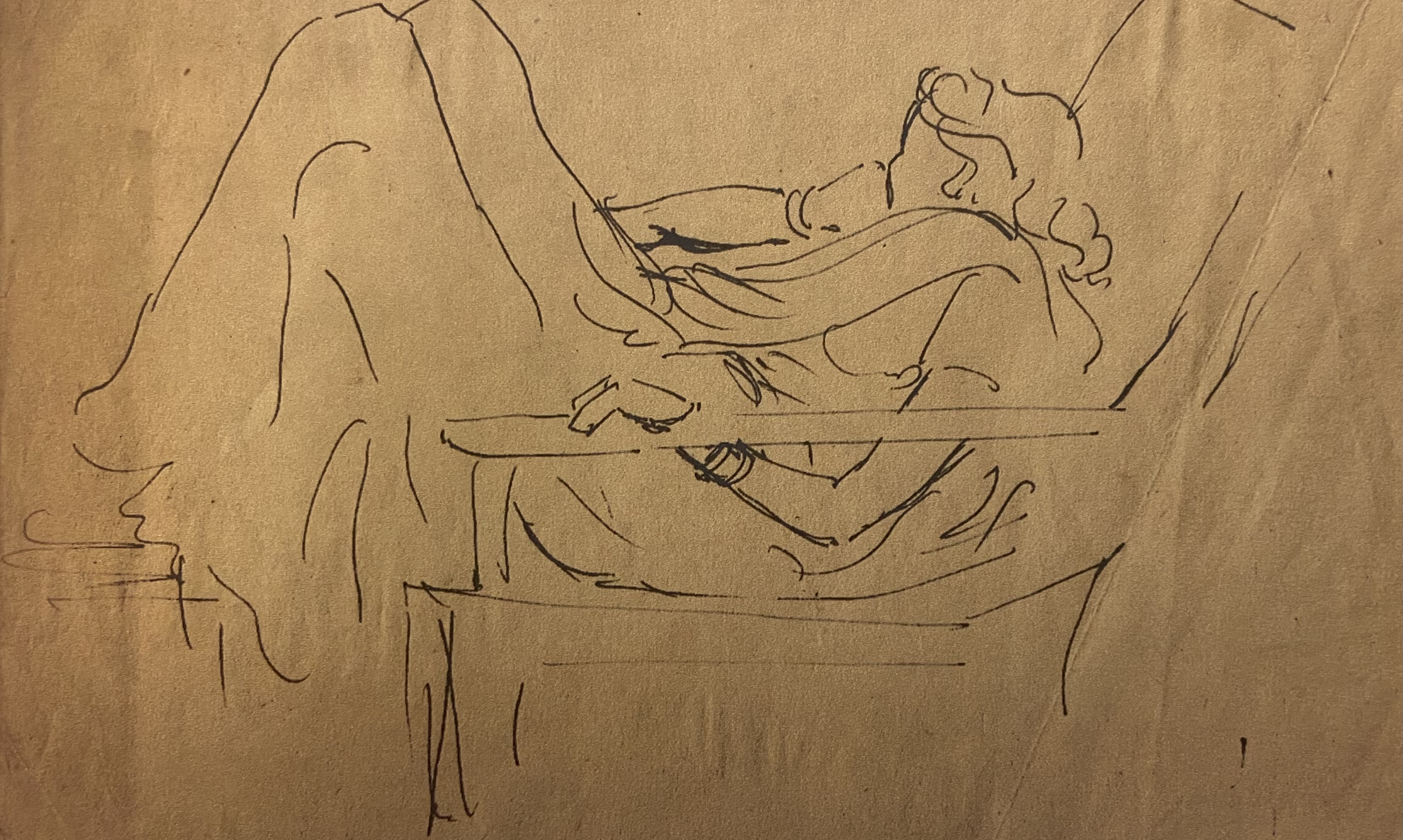
An early academic drawing by the artist from 1948
