= Kamal Kumar Majumdar =

Indian writer (1914–1979)

- Born: 17 November 1914; Calcutta, Bengal Presidency, British India
- Died: 9 February 1979 (aged 64); Calcutta, West Bengal, India
- Occupations: Teacher; Novelist; Editor
- Spouse: Dayamayee Majumdar

Kamal Kumar Majumdar (Bengali: কমলকুমার মজুমদার) (17 November 1914 – 9 February 1979) was an avant-garde Bengali writer and painter who is best known for his dense stylized prose that drew heavily from pre-colonial, classical Sadhu Bhasa syntax and vocabulary. Although criticized for literary obscurantism, his post-modernist fictions were lauded by the Krittibas group of Bengali writers, including Sunil Gangopadhyay. Among his best known works are Golap Sundari, Suhasinir Pometam and Antarjali Jatra.

== Early life ==
Majumdar was the son of Prafullachandra Majumdar and Renukamoyee Majumdar. Prafullachandra used to serve in the police department. Renukamoyee had keen literary interest and thus Kamalkumar was exposed to modern literary thoughts and trends from his childhood.

His parents were originally from Taki, a town in the 24 Parganas district (now in North 24 Parganas district), but the family shifted to Rikhia. Kamalkumar spent his childhood and adolescence in Kolkata, India. He started his studies in a school called "Bishnupur Shiksha Sangha" in Bishnupur but dropped formal studies before completing high school. For sometime, he studied Sanskrit in a Tol and learned sitar from a local maestro. In 1937 he established a magazine called "Ushnish" where he used to write under his real name as well as a number of pen names. But during 1944–45 he devoted himself mostly to painting. During 1937–38 he got numerous offers for going abroad which he refused.

Kamal Kumar was married to Dayamayee Majumdar and his younger brother was a renowned painter, Nirode Mazumdar. Their younger sister Shanu Lahiri (1928 – 2013) was also a noted painter and art educator.

== Works ==
=== Stories ===
- Lal Juto (The Red Shoes)
- Madhu (Honey)
- Jal (Water )
- Teish (Twenty Three)
- Mallika Bahar
- Matilal Padri
- Tahader Katha (Their Tale)
- Fauji Banduk
- Neem Annapurna (19kamalkumar65)
- Kayed Khana
- Rukminikumar
- Lupta Pujabidhi
- Khelar Bichar (Rules of the game)
- Khelar Drishyabali (Scenes of the game)
- Anitter Dayvag
- Konkal Eleigy (Elegy of the skeletons)
- Dwadash Mrittika
- Pingolabat
- Khelar aromvo (Start of the game)
- Bagan Keyari
- Aar chokhe jol
- Bagan Poridhi
- Kal e aatotai
- Justice Justice
- Prem (The Desire)
- Babu
- Princess
- Amod Bostumi
- Koschito Jibonchorit : tinti khosra

=== Novels ===
- Antarjali Jatra (The Final Passage, 1962)
- Golap Sundori
- Anila Smorone
- Shyam-Nouka
- Suhasinir Pometom
- Pinjare Bosiya Shuk
- Khelar Pratibha
- Shoborimangal

=== Other work ===
- Number of paintings
- Number of wood cut sculptures
- Edited a notable magazine named ANKA BHAVNA

A notable article on ANKA BHAVNA by mathematician Narayan Chandra Ghosh has been published in the December 2015 issue of Sristir Ekosh Satak Patrika. Before that he wrote articles on ANKA BHAVNA in Pratibimbha, Samakal 0 Bibriti. A book titled KAMAL KUMAR MAJUMDER o Anka Bhavan Edited by Narayan Ch Ghosh is most popular one.

== Movies based on his work ==
The movies such as Neem Annapurna directed by Buddhadev Dasgupta, Antarjali Jatra by Gautam Ghosh, Sati by Aparna Sen and Tahader Katha by Buddhadev Dasgupta were based on the novels and stories written by Majumdar. Gautam Ghosh made a Hindi movie named Mahayatra based on Majumdar's novel Antarjali Jatra.

Lal Juto, a Bengali film made by a student and based on Majumdar's short story of the same name, won the Best Creative Idea Award at the 11th Shanghai International Film Festival.

== See also ==
- Subimal Mishra
