= Calcutta Group =

Indian artistic movement (1943–1953)

The Calcutta Group was a group of modern artists in India, formed in 1943 in Kolkata. It has the distinction of being the first artistic movement of its kind in both Bengal and all of India. Though short-lived – the group disbanded in 1953 – the Calcutta Group was instrumental in the transformation of contemporary Indian art and brought this genre onto the world stage.

== Members ==
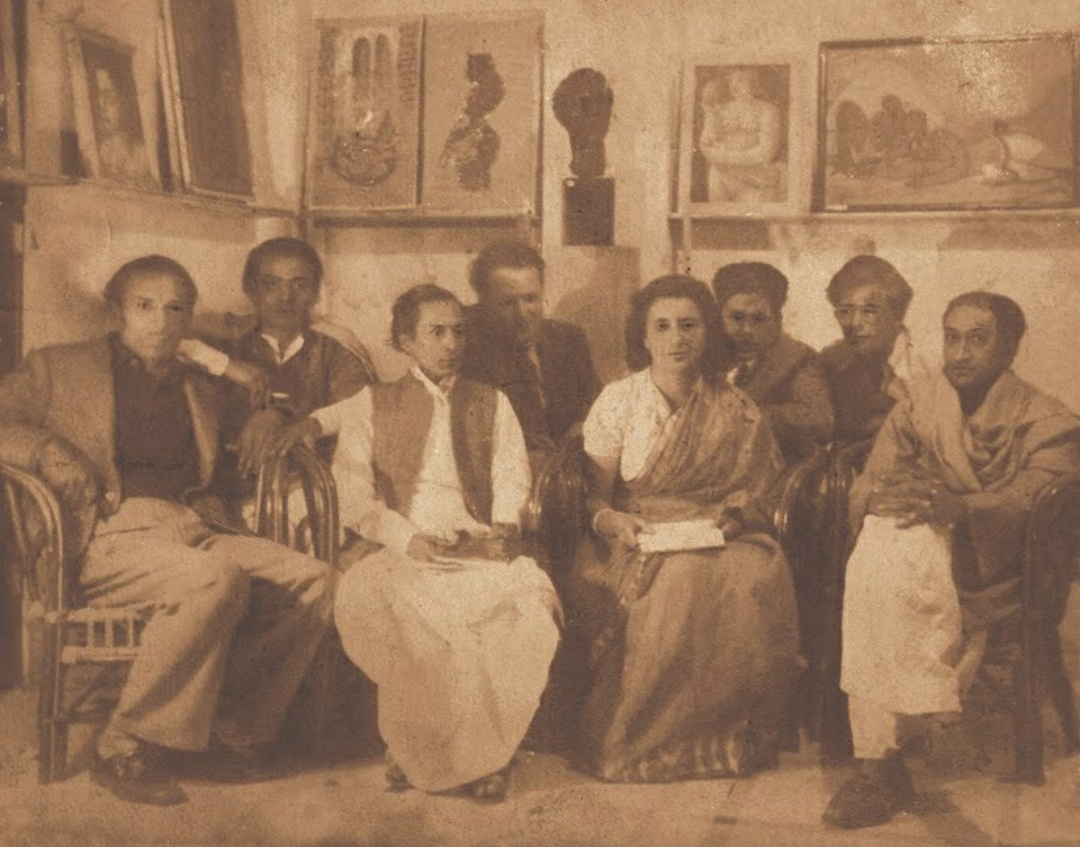
The Calcutta Group

=== Core members (1943) ===
- Subho Tagore
- Nirode Mazumdar
- Rathin Maitra
- Prankrishna Pal
- Gopal Ghosh
- Rabin Mondal
- Paritosh Sen
- Prodosh Dasgupta
- Kamala Das Gupta

=== Additional members ===
- Abani Sen (1947)
- Rathin Mitra (1949)
- Gobardhan Ash (1950)
- Sunil Madhav Sen (1952)
- Hemant Misra (1950)

== Formation ==
Rathin Maitra and Subho Tagore initiated the formation of the group in 1943. The group initially included fellow painters Nirode Mazumdar, Prankrishna Pal and Gopal Ghosh. Later that year, another painter, Paritosh Sen, along with sculptors Pradosh Das Gupta, Kamala Das Gupta joined the society. These eight members were known as the organization's core, as well as the driving force behind it. Over the years, other artists joined the group as well including Abani Sen in 1947, Rathin Mitra in 1949, Gobardhan Ash in 1950, Sunil Madhav Sen in 1952, and Hemanta Mistra in 1953.

== Philosophy ==
During this period of time, Bengal - a state in India, home to many of the group's members - had been facing many tragedies including wars, famines, massacres, and even the partition of the country. Stemming from these events, the members of the Calcutta Group focused not on aesthetic, but on the social and political realities of the state and nation at the time. Many of the group's members were actually sympathetic towards the Communist Party that was making its way through India and some were even militants themselves. The group's manifesto was a synthesis of all of these ideas that stressed two main points: renouncement of religion in art and creation of opportunities for Indian art to modernize. The first idea was meant to remove the evils of demagoguery and elitism and produce works that focused on the population as a whole. However, the dismissal of works based n Hindu mythology came across as anti-religious and even atheist and therefore shocked many, leading to the moniker "Artistic Scandal".

== Sources ==
- Partha Mitter, Indian Art (Oxford History of Art), Oxford University Press (2001), ISBN 0-19-284221-8 - page 193
- Krishna Dutta, Calcutta: A Cultural and Literary History (Cities of the Imagination), Interlink (2003), ISBN 1-56656-488-3 - page 233
- Nercam Nicolas, "Le clan des Tagore, de l'École du Bengale au Groupe de Calcutta" Arts asiatiques (tome 60, 2005) - page 16
- Rebecca M. Brown, Art For a Modern India, 1947-1980, Duke University Press (2009), ISBN 978-0-8223-4375-2 - page 14

== See also ==
- Baroda Group
- Bombay Progressive Artists' Group
