= Nirode Mazumdar =

Indian painter (1916–1982)

- Born: 11 May 1916; Calcutta, Bengal Presidency, British India
- Died: 26 September 1982 (aged 66)
- Occupation: Painter
- Spouse: Marguerite Mazumdar
- Children: Oditi Gallin Mazumdar; Chittrovanu Mazumdar

Nirode Mazumdar (11 May 1916 – 26 September 1982) was an Indian painter from the first generation of modernists, and a key member of the Calcutta Group. Almost a forgotten figure today, he strode the art scenario from the 40's like a colossus. Long before his other contemporaries recognised the importance of symbolism, he applied them generously to achieve his philosophical and artistic aspirations. His paintings are based on what he called 'constructive symbolism'. A significant artist of the last century, he was almost a cult figure amongst the art fraternity and a titan of 20th century modernism.

== Early life ==
Nirode Mazumdar was born to Prafulla Chandra Mazumdar and Renukamoyee Mazumdar on 11 May 1916 at Calcutta. Prafulla Chandra used to serve in the police department. Renukamoyee had a keen literary interest and thus Nirode Mazumdar was exposed to literary activities and trends from his childhood. Nirode Mazumdar was born into one of Calcutta's most prominent artistic and culturally elevated families-the Mazumdar family of seven siblings. He grew up in an atmosphere of intense creativity.

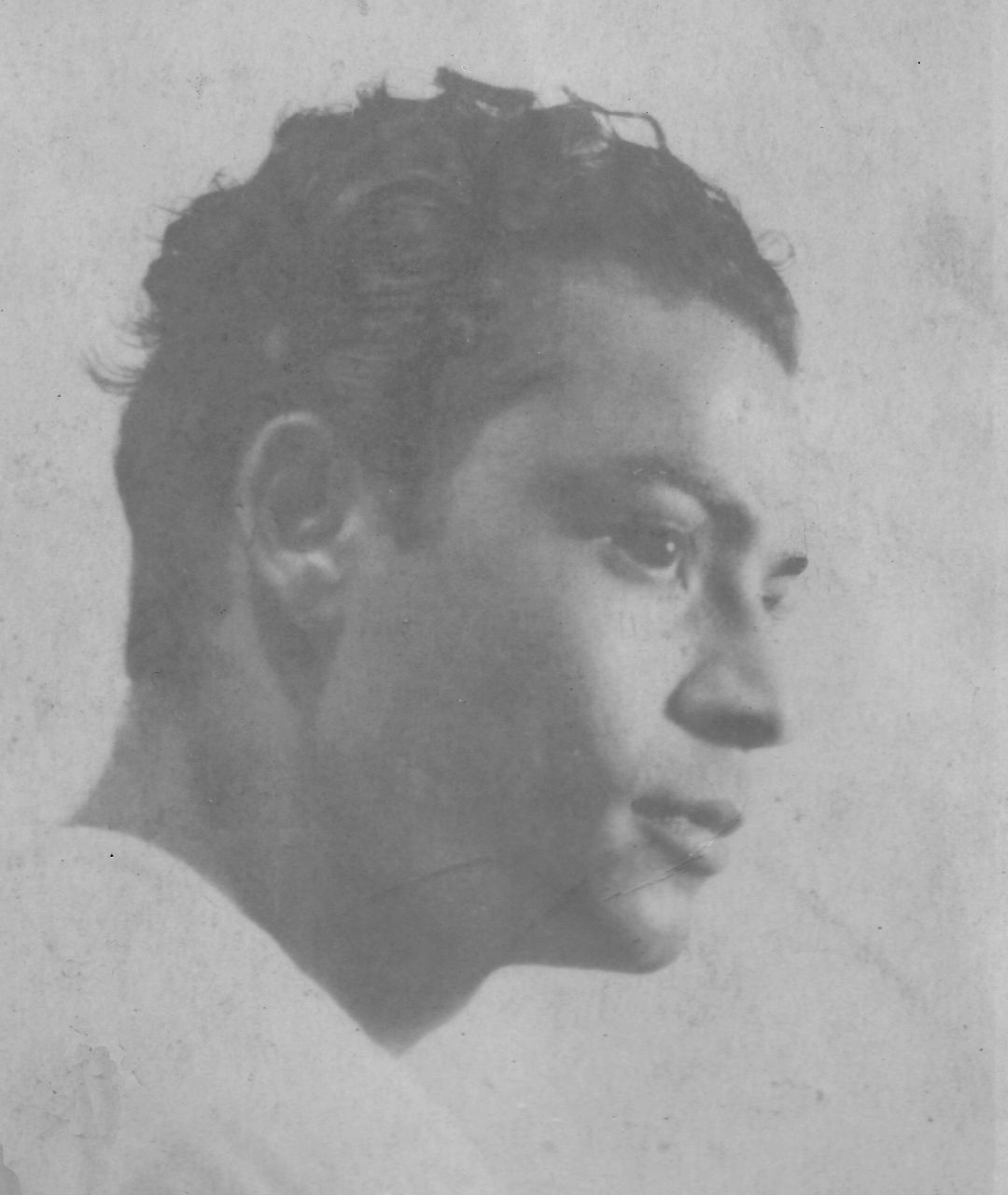
Nirode Mazumdar

His parents were originally from Taki, a town in the 24 Parganas district (now in North 24 Parganas district), but the family shifted to Calcutta. Nirode spent his childhood and adolescence in Kolkata (formerly Calcutta), India with his elder brother. At the age of six years, he started his studies in a school called "Bishnupur Shiksha Sangha" in Bishnupur with his elder brother Kamal Kumar but dropped his formal studies before completing high school. For sometime, he studied Sanskrit in a Tol at Kalighat. Nirode Mazumdar was the younger brother of renowned Bengali novelist Kamal Kumar Majumdar, their younger sister Shanu Lahiri (1928-2013) was also a noted painter and art educator.

== Education ==
Nirode Mazumdar was admitted into the Indian Society of Oriental Art in Calcutta in 1929 while he was only a mere boy of 13 and had his first education under Kshitindranath Majumdar, a student of Abanindranath Tagore. After he finished his course at the Indian Society of Oriental Art in 1939, Mazumdar was awarded the Norman Blount Memorial Award for his artistic skill. However, while studying under Abanindranath, Mazumdar was showing signs of disapproval and rebellion with how outdated the Bengal School was in keeping up with the socio-political climate at that time.

"As a young man he was involved in their search for roots. At the end of his period of apprenticeship with Abanindranath, he rose up in revolt. He felt the school was a gymnasium that taught students the futile methods of rendering the classics in paraphrase."

Much later, we get a more clear understanding about his complex relationship with Abanindranath Tagore and the Bengal School from 'Smritir Collage- A Collage of Memories' the memoirs of his sister Shanu Lahiri-

"From time to time Niru-da would take some of his paintings and visit Abanindranath Tagore. Abanindranath was then associated with the Oriental Art School. “Here comes Lanky!” Abanindranath would exclaim as soon as he saw Niru-da. “Get him here, let’s have a look at his paintings.” Niru-da would show his latest work: might be a composition of Rajasthani women walking in a graceful rhythm with three pots balanced one atop the other on their heads. “Why so many pots?” Abanindranath would say. “Well, there’s never enough water in Rajasthan, so the women always walk with as many pots as they can balance.” “No, no! We’ll manage quite well with one pot. No point having so many. This is a painting! You must paint only so much as will look good in the painting.” Niru-da would tell me many years later, “We have hardly had an artist with the kind of knowledge of painting that he had. It was only Abanindranath who understood the relationship of painting to Nature, and how the ‘real’ object was transformed in painting.” I’ve heard Niru-da say that Abanindranath’s was as temperamental as a zamindar. If he happened to fly into a rage he might say “Get out of here!” But the very next moment he might invite you affectionately to have a meal. And then for a couple of minutes, he would have a long pull on his gar-gara. Such heavenly fragrance would fill the air and the sky. Their home hosted a long procession of eminent people. It was an absolutely inspiring environment. Niru-da also had many occasions to meet Gaganendranath amidst the crowd at the Tagore household." The fact that Nirode Mazumdar along with the artists of his generation felt that the Bengal School was out of touch with current trends of the country and abroad like The Bengal Famine and the World War, was instrumental in the formation of The Calcutta Group in 1943.

In 1946, he received a scholarship from the French government to study painting in France. Mazumdar entered Paris during its golden period, Artists like Pablo Picasso, Georges Braque, Henri Matisse and Constantin Brâncuși were at the helm of their careers, students from across the world were flocking to Paris as it was the Mecca for the art world, studying at the various academies and studios, engaging in the café culture where long discussions on art with fellow students and friends took place. Mazumdar quickly became one of them. He studied and worked in the studio of French artist André Lhote, in Paris. Between 1946 and 1951, Nirode Mazumdar stayed is in Paris, and worked in different Parisian studios and participated in various exhibitions of foreign painters mainly at the École des Beaux-Arts. At the same time, he studied General History of Art along with 19th and 20th century painting at the École du Louvre. In Paris, Nirode Mazumdar actively embraced the French culture. He liked Paris so much that even when his term at the Louvre was over, he decided to stay on in Paris. The scholarship having ended, Nirode was forced to take on a school teacher's job.

== Career ==
In 1946 Nirode Mazumdar had his first one-man show in Calcutta. In 1949, he had a one-man show at Paris, which was presented by the art critic and poet Stanislas Fumet. In the same year 1949, he has an opportunity to visit Holland and to learn, in Utrecht, the technique of engraving which later on would have a bearing on his art. He left France for England in 1951 and there, he took part in exhibitions organized by the Indian High Commission in London, group shows, held at the India House and worked for some time as a curator of the art gallery there. It is actually in London where his new trend of thought takes shape.

In 1955, he returned to France. Back in Paris, Nirode continued his pictorial research, at the same time, plunging into the oriental philosophies, mythologies, his cultural heritage, and, in 1957, exhibits a series of oil paintings "Images Ecloses" (Blooming Images) in his Paris studio, the fruit of his research and study. These works were presented by Jeannine Auboyer, curator of the Guimet Museum(National museum of Asiatic Arts) Paris, at the time. This series of paintings was a turning point in his career. The highly original series of 23 paintings marked a decisive departure from the artist's past works. With it Nirode Mazumdar found what he was looking for all these years. The exhibition gave a sense of fulfillment and direction. By the time he came into his own, he had rejected Paris and her themes. He bade a total goodbye to the past by tearing up all his old paintings, many of which had been highly praised both in Paris and in London. After spending 11 years in Europe, especially in Paris, he returned to Calcutta in 1958. With him came his wife Marguerite, and their children Oditi Gallin-Mazumdar and Chittrovanu Mazumdar. And he left behind numerous close friends that included, Georges Braque, Constantin Brâncuși, Jean Cocteau, André Breton, Jean Genet and others.

From this time onwards and on his return to Calcutta, Nirode Mazumdar kept on working, searching, researching in pictorial, aesthetic, as well as philosophical domains. He painted large canvasses. Gradually, he moved towards Tantric themes in his work, and often explored a single concept over a series of paintings. His work remained rooted in the pictorial tradition of Bengal, which he harmonized with European modernism.

== The Calcutta Group ==
The history of The Calcutta Group remains a bit obscure. However the history of its formation can be traced back to Shanu Lahiri's memoirs- 'Smiritir Collage-A Collage of Memories'

"Coming back to the Calcutta Group, it had a strange beginning. It would be quite difficult to provide a proper history. Rathin-babu [Maitra] was a class friend of Subho Thakur at the Government Art College. He was a frequent visitor at the Jorasanko Thakurbari. Around that time, i.e. 1938 or so, Gopal Ghosh was working with Kanwal Krishna at the corner of Cornwallis Street. Rathin babu was also known to them. Subho Thakur’s Neel rokto lal hoye gelo (Blue blood turns red) had just been published...around 1942 or ‘43. Baba had read the book: he praised it. Ma read out parts of the book to all of us at home. Rathin-babu’s mother was equally surprised and pleased when she read the book. And she asked her son, why don’t you bring Subho home one day? Rathin-babu obliged and took his friend to meet his parents. Subho Thakur expressed his desire to bring out a magazine and also mentioned that he didn’t have the funds for it. I believe Rathin-babu’s parents helped him out with some money for the magazine. Subho Thakur was a frequent visitor to our home as well; he liked looking at Niru- da’s paintings, and chatted with us all. I remember one time when dada and Niru-da had just come back from Rikhia and Niru-da was painting with thick lines at this time; the work had an overall bold effect. Have you seen the line drawings that Niru has been doing? Rathin-babu asked Subho Thakur. Niru-da had not as yet begun work in oils. He was still working along the ‘oriental’ line/style. In 1943, during the time of the Bengal Famine, Niru-da and Subho Thakur brought out a new magazine called Atikrama (trans) under their joint editorship. Niru-da's line drawings were first brought out in this magazine. Perhaps there are many who do not know of this magazine. The three of them brought it out together. Alongside, they began to plan and organize the Group.......Perhaps in our context the contribution of the Group may not amount to much, but undoubtedly at one point the Group served as a landmark, initiating new directions....Subho Thakur's home on S.R. Das Road was where they held their first exhibition. The house was full of paintings by each of the artists. The then governor's wife Mrs.Casey inaugurated the exhibition. Quite an event it was, replete with police, motorbikes and all the rest. At first the two people who held it together was Rathin Maitra and Subho Thakur. Later on came Gopal Ghosh, the sculptor Prodosh Dasgupta and Paritosh Sen. Niru-da introduced Prankrishna Pal. Satyajit Ray used to live opposite our house near the Triangular Park. He too often came to these sessions, which would flow out into the street as people walked to Prodosh Dasgupta's studio at the other end of the road. Prodosh-babu's wife, whom we addressed as Kamal-boudi was a regular too....However, well before 1947 when Niru-da left for Paris both Rathin Maitra and Gopal Ghosh had left the Group. Meanwhile, Goverdhan Aish and Rathin Mitra had joined. I too was invited after I passed out from the Government Art College. I believe it was Prodosh-babu who invited me. But I had never really liked the Group."

Many hold the opinion that modernism in Indian art started with the works of the artists of the Bombay ‘Progressive Artists Group’. There is a raging controversy regarding this & it is high time we strongly refute this opinion. The ‘Calcutta Group’ was formed four years before the ‘Progressive Artists Group’. The artists of this group had followed from very close quarters the growth of nationalism in the country. They also observed the adverse effects of colonialism of national realism. The reactions this realism generated in them have been sought to be articulated in the language of art by these artists in their works. This search started long before the Bombay group was formed. From this angle there can possibly be no doubt that the artists of the ‘Calcutta Group’ were the chief pioneers of modernity in Indian art.

The founding members of the group in 1943 were Nirode Mazumdar, Gopal Ghosh, Kamala Dasgupta, Prodosh Dasgupta and Paritosh Sen. Later, Abani Sen, Rathin Mitra, Gobardhan Ash, Sunil Madhav Sen and Hemanta Mishra joined the group. Though Ramkinkar Baij participated in their group exhibitions, he formally never joined the group. In the Amrita Bazaar Patrika, dated 27 March 1945, it was written in a critical commentary about the exhibition that: ” A group of seven artists of this city have branded themselves under the label ‘Calcutta Group’, a happy echo of the unhappy ‘London Group’. The Calcutta Group like its London prototype claims to be held together by a common creed to abjure academical ‘conventions’ Indian or European, though adhering to Indian Traditions. The quote reveals the outlines of the idealistic basis of the group. A critic of ‘The Statesman’ wrote: “The source from which the Calcutta Group, who I expect would issue a manifesto of their artistic preferences derives its inspiration from Gauguin, Modigliani and Matisse. In January 1949 the fourth Annual Exhibition of the group took place in Artistry House at 15 Park Street which was heavily praised by the press and critics. The foremost purpose of the group was to render Western modernism with the Indian situation. Establishing itself in 1943 when Bengal was oppressed by famine and pestilence and when the whole Eastern and Western world seemed to be abandoned by the gods, these painters assembled themselves in order to demonstrate that MAN was still alive and was to dominate the Fine Arts which had flourished already in spite of social disruption.

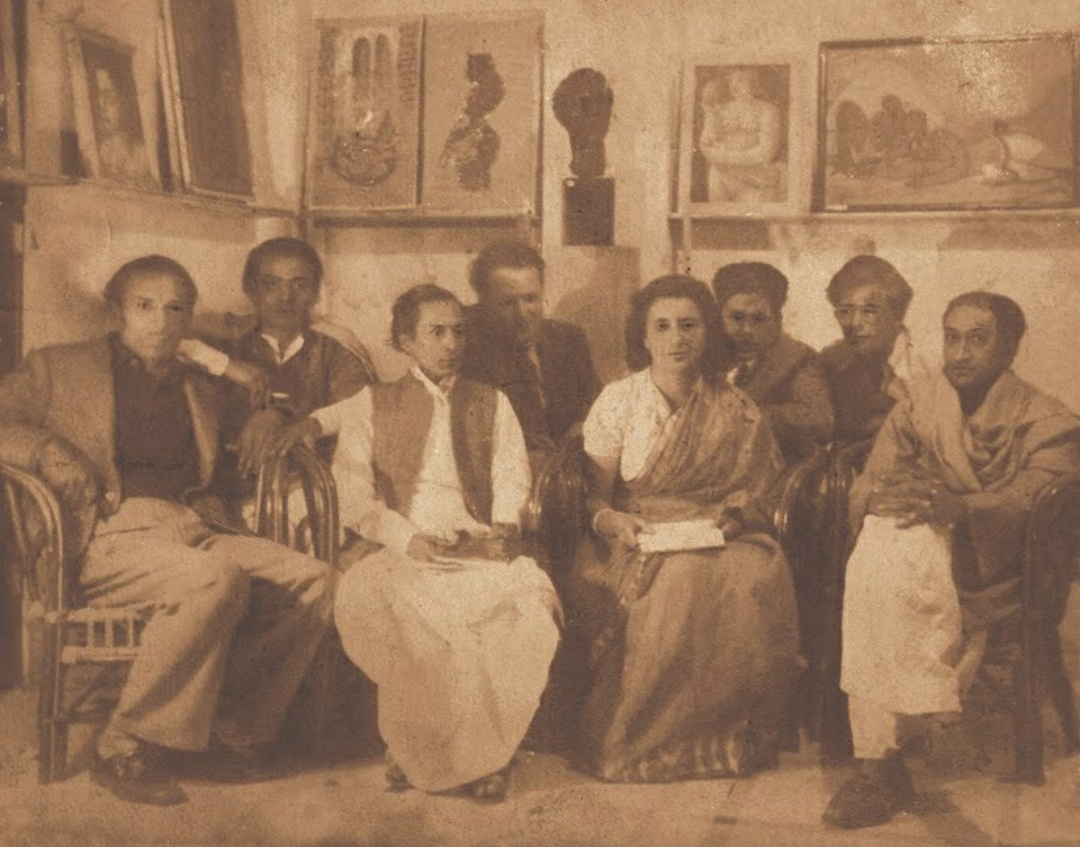
The Calcutta Group-1943

By the end of the 40’s most of the artists settled in Paris as it was still the Mecca of the art world. Nirode Mazumdar was the first Indian artist to be awarded a French Government Scholarship, in 1937 Prodosh Dasgupta went to the Royal Academy to learn sculpture and soon painters like Paritosh Sen, S.H.Raza, Ram Kumar, Shanu Lahiri, Sankho Chowdhury, Haimati Sen, Anjolie Ela Menon and Akbar Padamsee followed. Thus without any doubt it can be easily said that the ‘Calcutta Group’ served as one of the first groups of modern art in India and Asia. With the combined effort of these painters an organised art movement developed which paved the way for modernism in Indian Art.

== Exhibitions ==
As a vehicle for the Hindu doctrinal concept, Nirode Mazumdar adopted the story of Bipula and Lakshmindar in his 'Images Ecloses' series. In each canvas an identical point holds the central position-'hrid pushkara'-according to which the patterns are distributed and is the stable zone of the non-manifested from which the whole picture is generated. He chose the bird as his subject in 1961 for his second series 'The Wing of No End'-which was chosen to stress the notion of time and eternity, delineating the sensible and intelligible in art form and analysing how, in the art of space the measured, the non-measured and the non-measurable can be distinguished. The oil paintings were on the theme Garuda's voyage, and the small gouache paintings took up motives from different traditions, to point out the importance of all traditions in art. In 1962, a retrospective "Ten years of painting" was held at The Academy of Fine Arts, while "Visual Hymn" his third series consisted of 13 paintings to texts aimed at expressing the Tantric idea was held at the Jehangir Art Gallery in Mumbai 1963, "Nine Variations on Symbolic Nine" Homage to Dante, was held at The Academy of Fine Arts in Calcutta 1965- here the artist was purely concerned with descriptive numbers where the ontological and logical orders are interwoven in rhythmical and geometrical images."Shodosi Kala" (the Cosmic Mother in different hours of the day and different periods of the year) was held at the Academy of Fine Arts in Calcutta in1967 and marked an important point in the artist's oeuvre of constructive symbolism. Here, the cosmic mother had been imagined at various control points of time that make a year: dawn, twilight, zenith, nadir, eclipse, equinoxes, solstices and reach the point where symbolically the Sun and Moon meet and manifestation ceases. In 1968, at New Delhi, he exhibited a series "The Quest" (from Katha Sharit Sagara) along with a retrospective of some of his previous paintings. This exhibition was organized by the Alliance Française of New Delhi under the patronage of Jean Daridan, the French Ambassador at that time. In the 1970s, Mazumdar had an exhibition of the series "Final Spring" (episode from the Mahabharata) in Kolkata and Santiniketan. "Nityakala" another series was based on lunar symbolism. He participates in the show "Francophile Painters" organized by Alliance Française Kolkata. Then comes the series of very large paintings "Boitoroni" (River of Life). In 1970, he also conceived and executed a structure in Jharkhand (India) which he called the "Temple". A vision of a minimal structure open to the sky and the elements. In 1977 he travelled to Paris for a few months where he had an exhibition at the "Galerie Transposition". He returned to France in 1978 and had an exhibition at Lyon.

In the years 1979–1982, Nirode Mazumdar started writing his memoirs under the title "Punascha Parry" (Paris Revisited) in the weekly Bengali magazine "Desh". In 1981, he had an exhibition in Burnpur West Bengal and, in this same year, his last exhibition would take place in Calcutta, a retrospective along with the two new series of paintings "Abaraniya" (episode from the Mahabharata) and "Sthira Bhava" (from Sree Sree Chandi). Mazumdar continued to write in the weekly magazine Desh. Once his memoirs finished, he was working with the publisher "Ananda Publications" to bring out "Punascha Parry" in the form of a book.

In 1969 and 1971 he participated in the Indian Triennale held in New Delhi and in 1970 the Lalit Kala Akademi elected him as an eminent artist.

Nirode Mazumdar died in September 1982 at the age of 66.

== Style and legacy ==
On a closer examination of Nirode Mazumdar's art one finds a delicate and poetic drama. All through his painting career, he conceived each painting and series-the visual and the verbal as one, integrating them in his own symbolic pictorial construction. Each series easily conveys a long period of study before the actual painting. They are the result of sleepless nights and innumerable drawings. In fact drawings form the nucleus and foundation of all the remarkable paintings he produced. Behind them is a restless roving mind, juggling a kaleidoscope of shapes into tentative forms. For Nirode Mazumdar, drawing formed the intellectual side of art. With both technical control and emotional spontaneity they combine the best of his two worlds- the early education he received under the Bengal School and his exposure to modernist trends he experienced in Paris as a student. The method of his painting is difficult to describe given how powerful an artist he was. We get a glimpse about his practice from an interview given by his equally talented son Chittrovanu Mazumdar-

"My earliest memories are very visual. A palette, at eye level and close up, this lush substance, the smell of oil paint, the violence of different colours being mixed together at lightning speed, right in front of my eyes-entirely tactile and sensual. Yet, at one level it was a very normal, everyday thing, because that's your father and he works at home." With no elaborate technique and the apparent use of heavy lines, Nirode Mazumdar's paintings often give the impression of a mysterious tree spreading its branches. There is a complex internal organisation in them, where he uses symbols opulently, even extravagantly where the basis is often geometrical. For Mazumdar, any painting needed to be geometrically visualised and the visual idea could not be translated into concrete terms except through geometry. A marvelous colourist, he was greatly influenced by Paul Cézanne, became a close disciple of Brâncuși and Braque and influenced many artists of the next generation like Bijan Choudhury, Prokash Karmakar and Karuna Shaha. His visual language was inimitably original, full of lyrical imagery even when he was addressing ordinary subjects.

== Works ==
- Mazumdar Nirode, and Sena Rāmaprasāda, translated by Gayatri Chakravorty Spivak. 2000. Song for Kali: a cycle of images and songs. Calcutta: Seagull Books.
- Mazumdar Nirode, Punascha Parry, first published in a weekly basis in the magazine Desh, late 1970s to early 1980s. Published as a book by Ananda Publishers in 1983 (after the artist's death in 1982).
