= Gopal Ghose =

Indian painter (193-1980)

- Born: 5 December 1913; Shyambazar, Calcutta, British India
- Died: 30 July 1980 (aged 66)

Gopal Ghose (5 December 1913 – 30 July 1980) was an Indian painter from West Bengal. In 1943, he was one of the founders of the Calcutta Group, perhaps the first group of modernist painters in India.

== Life and career ==
Ghose was born in Calcutta, West Bengal on 5 December 1913. After obtaining a diploma in painting from the Government College of Arts and Crafts, Jaipur in 1935, he trained in sculpture at the Government College of Art and Crafts, Chennai in 1938, where he studied under Debi Prasad Roy Choudhuri.

Initially influenced by the Bengal School, Ghose was drawn to the pictorial vocabulary developed by European Expressionists and Cubists to depict nature. Ghose reworked the genre of landscape painting, investing it with expressionistic qualities. He travelled extensively within India to paint his landscapes. Ghose was adept with several mediums, and known especially for his ingenious handling of watercolour. He also worked with tempera, pen and ink, and brush and pastel.

He was one of the founder members of the well-known Calcutta Group (1943). Ghose taught at the Indian Society of Oriental Art, in Kolkata from 1940 to 1945 and then joined the faculty of the Bengal Engineering College, Shibpur (then affiliated with the University of Calcutta), where he taught architectural drawing. He was also the joint secretary of the Academy of Fine Arts in Kolkata.

His works can be seen at the Birla Academy of Art & Culture, Kolkata, and the National Gallery of Modern Art, New Delhi.

He died on 30 July 1980.

== Exhibitions ==
- The Chromatic Image - Gopal Ghose at Akar Prakar, New Delhi. (2017)
- Gopal Ghose: A Jubilant Quest for the Chromatic at NGMA, New Delhi in association with Akar Prakar. Curated by Sunjoy Kumar Mallik (2012)
