= Paritosh Sen =

Indian artist (1918–2008)

- পরিতোষ সেন
- Born: 26 September 1918; Dhaka, British India
- Died: 22 October 2008(age 90); Kolkata, India

Paritosh Sen (Bengali: পরিতোষ সেন) (26 September 1918 – 22 October 2008) was a leading Indian artist. He was born in Dhaka (then known as Dacca), the present-day capital of Bangladesh. He was a founder member of the Calcutta Group, an art movement established in 1942 that did much to introduce modernism into Indian art.

Sen pursued his artistic training at the Academie Andre Lhote, the Academie la Grande Chaumiere, the Ecole des Beaux Arts, and the Ecole des Louvre in Paris. Upon his return to India, he taught first in Bihar and then at Jadavpur University. He also taught art at The Daly College at Indore during the late 1940s.

In 1969 he was the recipient of the French Fellowship for Designing and Typeface and in 1970 he was awarded a Rockefeller Fellowship. Sen has exhibited widely both in India and abroad, including the Calcutta Group exhibition (1944), London (1962), São Paulo Biennale (1965), New Delhi Triennale (1968, 1971, 1975), Sweden (1984), and the Havana Biennale (1986).

In 1959/60, Sen published Zindabahar, a book of autobiographical sketches in which he memorialized the Dacca city of his childhood.

He died in Kolkata.

== See also ==
- Kurchi Dasgupta
