= Hemen Majumdar =

Bengali painter (1894–1948)

Hemendranath Majumdar
- Born: 19 September 1894; Mymensingh District, British India (present-day Kishoreganj, Bangladesh)
- Died: 22 July 1948 (aged 53); Calcutta, West Bengal, India
- Known for: Painting

Hemendranath Majumdar, also Mazumdar (1894–1948), was a Bengali painter.

== Early life ==
Majumdar was born in Kishoreganj, British India (now in Bangladesh).

In 1910, he joined The Government School of Art in Calcutta (now Government College of Art & Craft Kolkata), and from 1911 to 1915 studied at Jubilee Art School, Calcutta.

== Career ==
Hemen Majumdar painted the gates to welcome King George V, on his visit to India in 1911.

In 1919, he founded Indian Academy of Fine Art in Calcutta along with Jogeshchandra Seal, Jamini Roy, Bhabani Charan Laha and Atul Bose.

He also published a journal, Shilpi, with A.C. Mukhopadhyay.

In 2002 one of his paintings was stolen and found with an art dealer.

== Works ==
- Cure of all Ills - Painted Mahatma Gandhi spinning thread
- Kaner - Dul - Earring

== Awards ==
- 1921-22 First Prize, Bombay Art Exhibition, Bombay
