= Nisha Pillai =

Indian journalist based in London

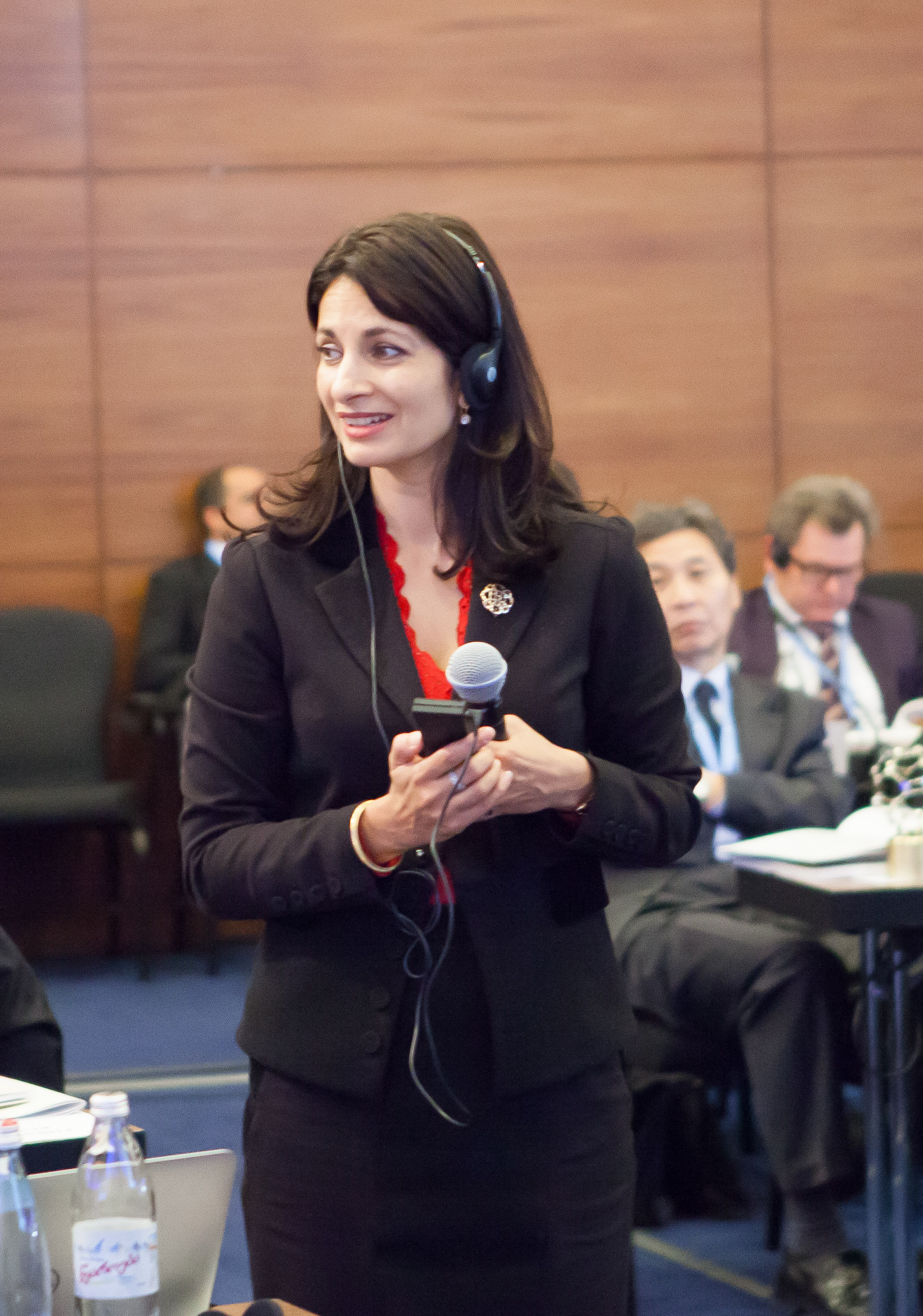
- Pillai moderating a discussion at an ITU conference.
- Born: Kolkata, India
- Education: LSE
- Occupation: News presenter
- Agent(s): JLA, Hilary Knight, Kate Moon
- Notable credit(s): Panorama "The Max Factor"; BBC World News live on 9/11
- Children: 2
- Relatives: Sir Biren Mookerjee (grandfather); Sir Narayanan Raghavan Pillai (grandfather)
- Website: nishapillai.com

Nisha Pillai is an Indian journalist based in London. She is a main news anchor for BBC World News.

== Early life ==
Pillai was born in Kolkata, India, and grew up in Mumbai. When she was 14, her family moved to London, England. She attended a girls school in Birmingham, then graduated in analytical economics at the London School of Economics.

Her mother Nita Pillai (née Mookherjee) was the younger daughter of industrialist Sir Biren Mookerjee and Lady Ranu Mookherjee, an impresario and an associates of Rabindranath Tagore. Her paternal grandfather was the former Ambassador of India to France, Sir Narayanan Raghavan Pillai.

== Career ==
After attending university, she joined Schroders Investment Bank, then moved into journalism with the weekly Investors Chronicle. Pillai joined the BBC in 1986, first working on The Money Programme, then Panorama from 1990 to 1995. Her nine-month investigation into financial affairs of media proprietor Robert Maxwell was presented as "The Max Factor", which won an award from the Royal Television Society in 1991.

She joined the BBC World News channel in 1995 as one of the main anchors, presenting the hourly news reports. In 1997, she presented the channel's coverage of Pakistan's 50th anniversary of independence in Islamabad, and, from Jerusalem in 1998, Israel's 50th anniversary of its declaration of independence. Pillai gave live coverage of the September 11 attacks and the fall of Baghdad. She has also hosted live interactive debates between audiences in America and in connected studios in Pakistan and Jordan.

She has also presented the BBC's flagship interview programme HARDtalk, and listed her interviewees as including Hindu nationalist Bal Thackeray of the Shiv Sena, musician Phil Collins, writer V. S. Naipaul and Bollywood megastar Amitabh Bachchan.

Pillai coaches senior executives in presentation skills at London Business School, records podcast interviews on economic analysis for a ratings agency, and facilitates many conferences and economic forums. She counts her understanding of economics and mental arithmetic among her strong points.

== Personal life ==
She has two children, Layla, who is a doctor, and Kiran, and visits India regularly.
