= Gobardhan Ash =

Indian artist (1907–1996)

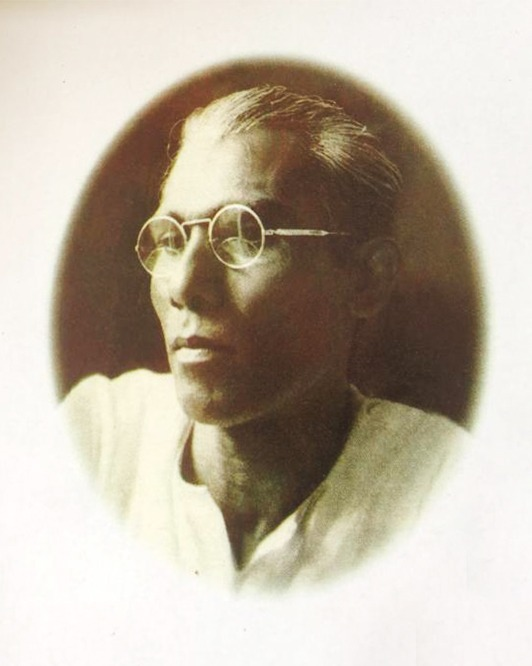
- Born: 5 August 1907; Begampur
- Died: 22 December 1996 (aged 89)
- Occupation: Painter
- Movement: Young Artists' Student Union; Art Rebel Center; Calcutta Group

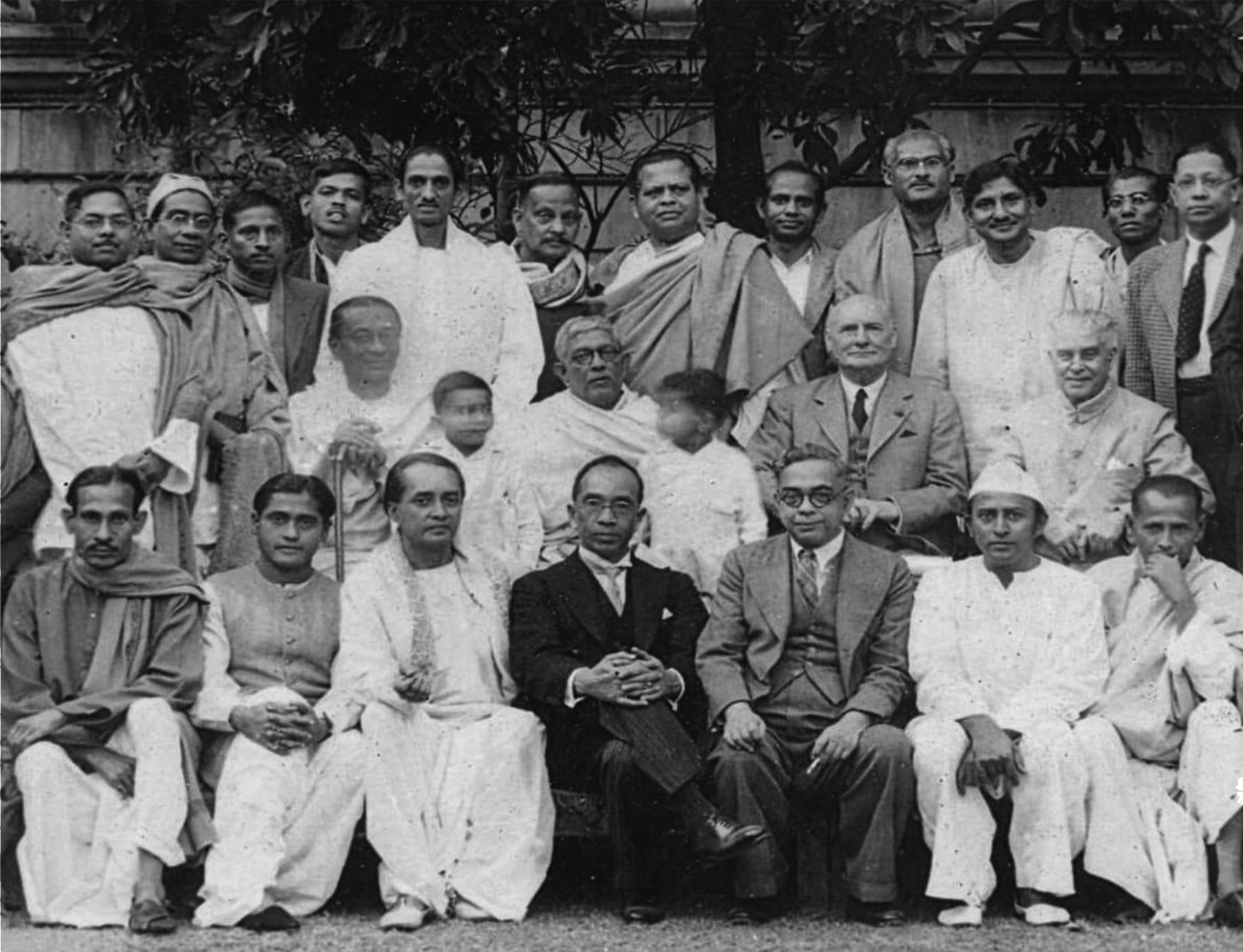
Standing third row second from right – Gobardhan Ash. Seated middle row from right second Percy Brown and third Jamini Roy. Front row from right fourth Atul Bose at the Government College of Art & Craft 1929

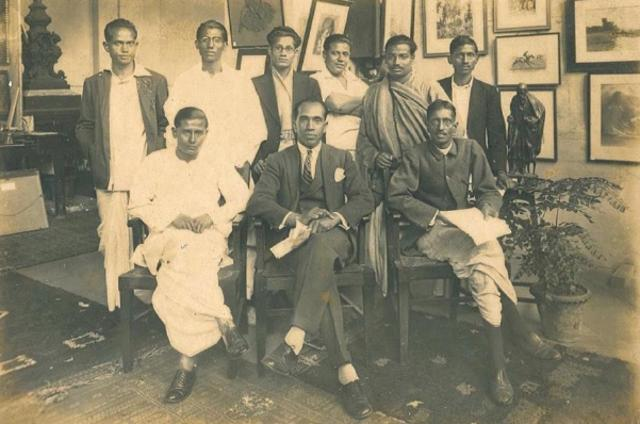
Standing from left: Abani Sen, Gobardhan Ash, Bimal Dey, Jahar Sen, Ardhendu Chatterjee, Haridhan Dutta.Sitting from left: S.N. Dey, Atul Bose, Amiya Basu at Academy of Fine Arts, Kolkata First Annual Exhibition, Kolkata -1933

Gobardhan Ash (5 August 1907 – 22 December 1996) was an Indian artist from Begampur, Hooghly and an early modernist as per the art critic Sovom Som. Ebrahim Alkazi states that "Gobardhan wielded considerable influence as an artist in the 1940s". He co-founded the Art Rebel Center in 1933 and was a member of the Calcutta Group. He was mentored by and close to the artist Atul Bose. Gobardhan was employed as the Chief Artist at the Indian Institute of Arts and Industry in Kolkata in 1946 for a period of two years and subsequently employed from 1953 as a Senior Teacher at the Indian Art School of Kolkata. Ranjit Hoskote specifically identifies Gobardhan's 1948 - 1951 period wherein Gobardhan "focusses on creating a style similar to various idioms within pattachitra into a consciousness that is clearly aware of cinema and animation".

== Education ==
Ash was born in Begampur in the Hooghly district into an impoverished family and, following his stint in Calcutta in 1926-30, joined the government school of arts and crafts in Madras in 1932 under Debiprasad Roy Choudhury. Gobardhan Ash had initially joined the Government College of Art, Kolkata as a student in 1926. He lost his scholarship at the school due to his involvement with the civil disobedience movement in 1930's. Differences with the teaching methods and an open skirmish with the then principal Mukul Dey ultimately led to the formation of a group called the Young Artist's Student Union in 1931 and the Art Rebel Center. He subsequently studied under Devi Prasad Roy Chowdhury at the Government Art School in Madras.

== Lifetime achievement awards ==
- Award From the Academy of Fine Arts, Kolkata, 1937
- Abanindranath Puraskar for lifetime service and excellence in the field of art practice (Abanindranath Tagore award), 1984
- All India Fine Arts and Crafts Society Honors Gobardhan Ash for his contribution to Art, 1988
- Art Heritage Award, 1985
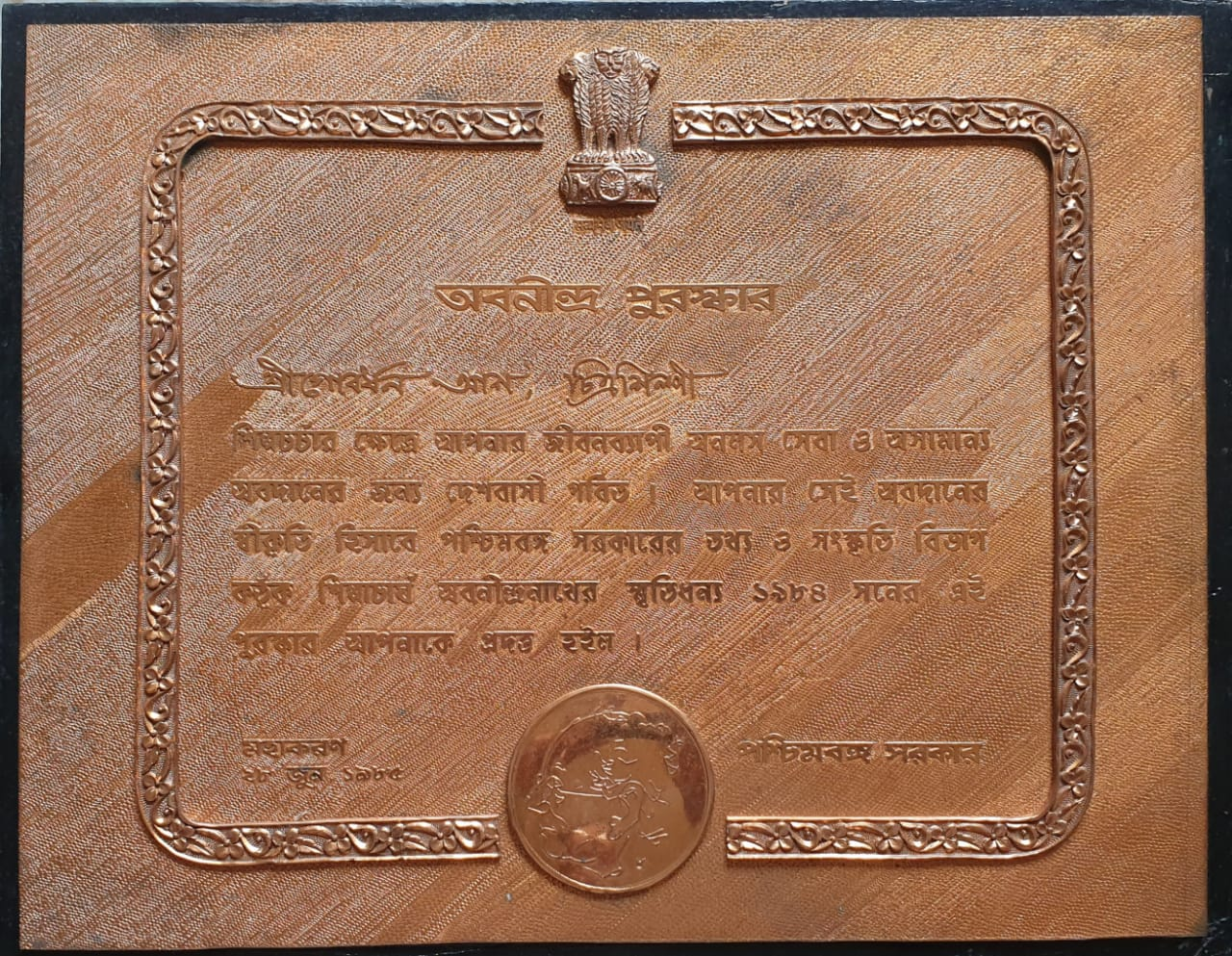
Abanindra Puraskar

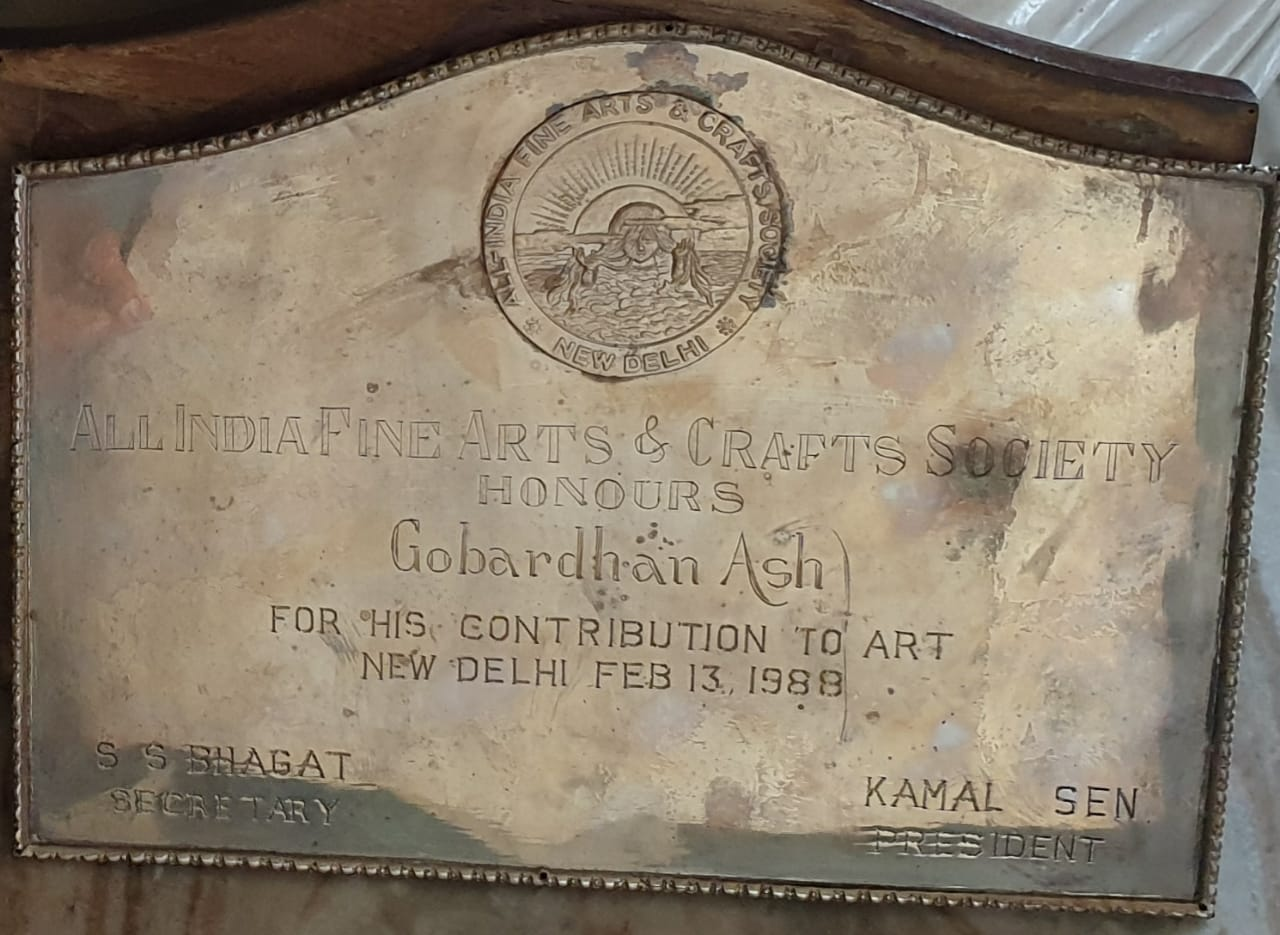
AIFACS Award

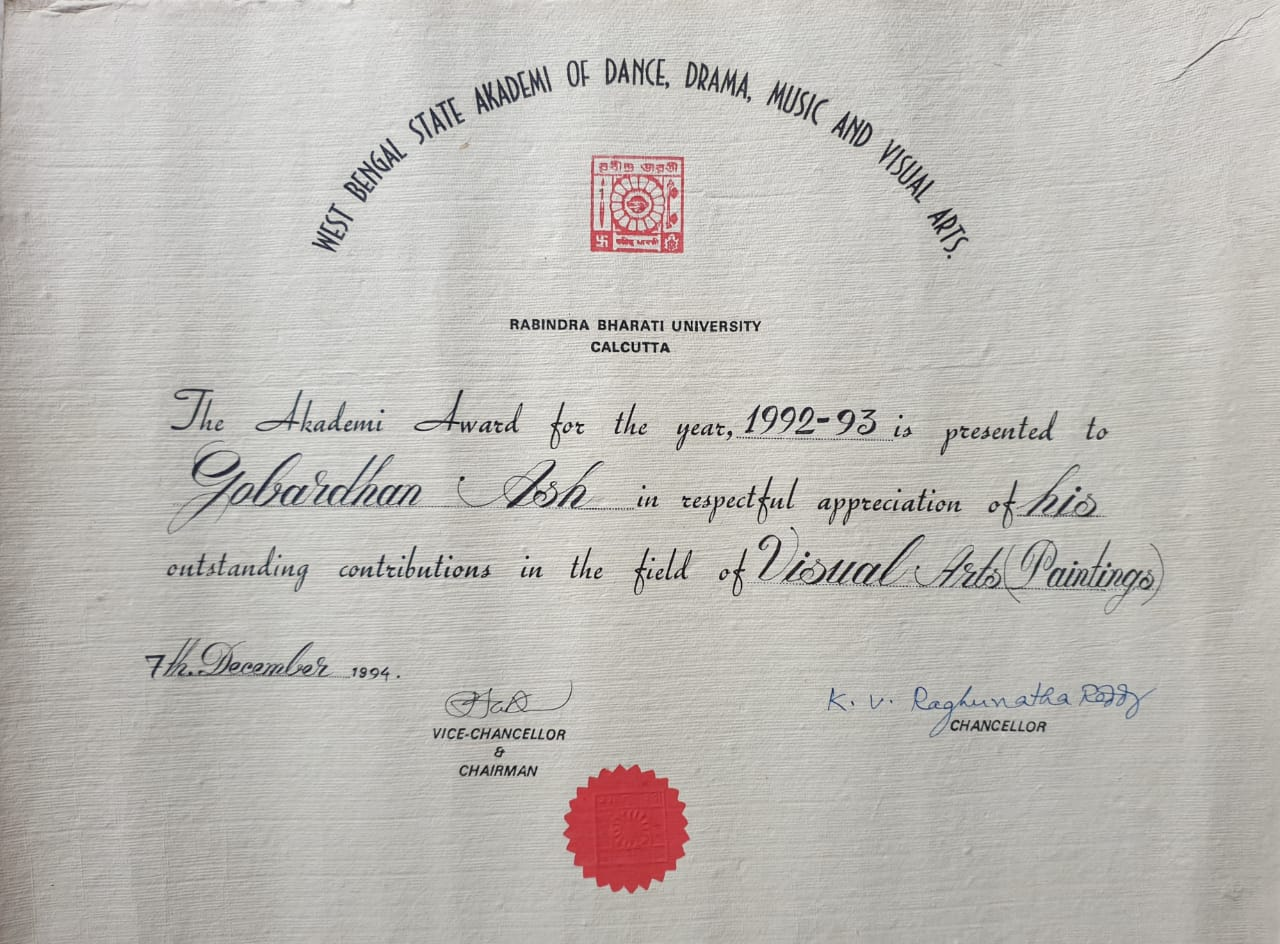
Akademi Award

== Exhibitions ==
- February 1930 - Calcutta University Institute, First Annual Exhibition
- April 1933 - Art Rebel Centre Exhibition
- December 1933 - January 1934, First Exhibition of the Academy of Fine Arts, Kolkata
- December 1934 - January 1935, Second Annual Exhibition of the Academy of Fine Arts, Kolkata
- December 1936 - January 1937, Fourth Annual Exhibition of the Academy of Fine Arts, Kolkata
- December 1940, Exhibition of the Society of Modern Arts
- December 1946, Twenty-Third Annual Exhibition by the Students and ex-Students of the Government College of Art & Craft, Kolkata
- January 1948, Indian Exhibition in Singapore
- April 1950, Exhibition of Paintings & Sculptures by the members of the Calcutta Group and the Bombay Progressive Artists' Group
- March 2024, Gobardhan Ash Retrospective Exhibition (1929 - 1969) Kolkata Centre for Creativity
