= Academy of Fine Arts, Kolkata =

Coordinates: 22.5429508°N 88.3453662°E

Academy of Fine Arts

General information
- Location: Cathedral Road, Kolkata, 2, Cathedral Road, Kolkata 700 071
- Opened: 1933

Website
- https://academyoffinearts.in/

The Academy of Fine Arts, in Kolkata (formerly Calcutta) is one of the oldest fine arts societies in India. The galleries of the Academy is in 6,300 square feet of space. Academy has an auditorium, a conference centre, and several priceless collections of paintings, textiles, etc.

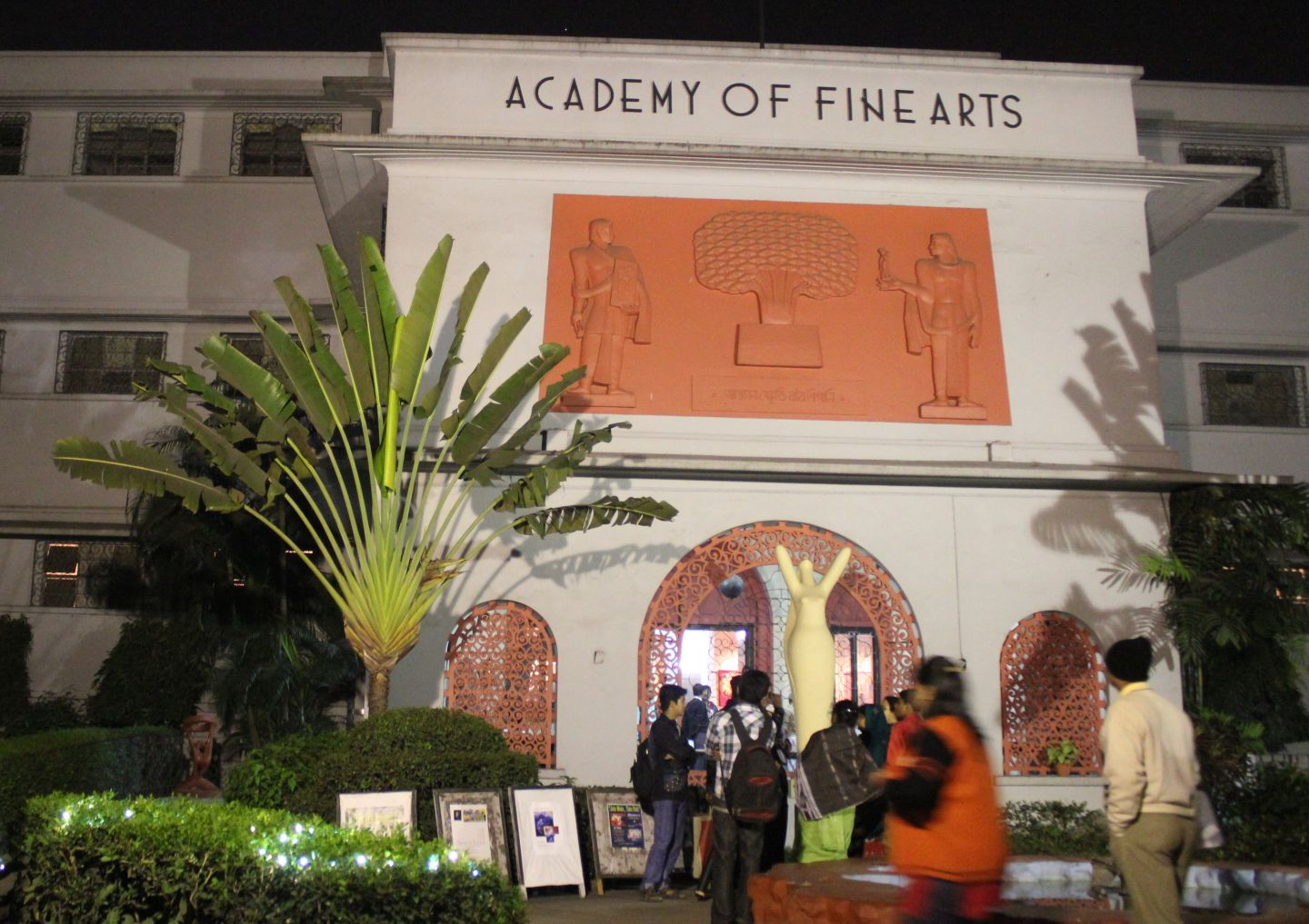
Entrance of Academy of Fine Arts Kolkata

== History ==
The academy was established in 1933 by Lady Ranu Mukherjee. It was initially located in a room loaned by the Indian Museum, and the annual exhibitions used to take place in the adjoining verandah. In the 1950s, thanks to the efforts of Lady Ranu Mookerjee and patronage by Bidhan Chandra Roy, Chief Minister of West Bengal, as well as Jawaharlal Nehru, the Prime Minister of India, the academy was shifted to a much larger space in the Cathedral Road.

The Academy is situated at the heart of the city with the St. Paul's Cathedral on one side, and the Rabindra Sadan-Nandan-Sisir Mancha complex, on the other. At present, Prasun Mukherjee is the chairman of board of trustees and Kallol Bose is the Jt. secretary of the executive committee.

== Collections ==
The Academy has a collection of paintings and textiles from the Bengal School, majorly gifted by Lady Ranu Mukherjee. There are some famous paintings such as Saat Bhai Champa by Gaganendranath Tagore, Shiva with Ganesh by Jamini Roy. Textiles collection includes Baluchari, Jamdani garments. Rabindranath Tagore's manuscripts of Bhanusingher Padabali find a special place. Artworks of the Tagores: Rabindranath, Abanindranath and Gaganendranath and those of Sunayani Devi, Atul Bose, Nandalal Bose, Ramkinkar Baij and Benode Behari Mukherjee are also there. The Academy also hosts very early works of Jamini Roy, and Jogen Chowdhury.

== Theatre auditorium ==
There is a theatre auditorium in Academy of Fine Arts which is one of the popular spots for performers and viewers of the city. Since 1984, an annual theatre festival is organised here. Shambhu Mitra's theatre group, Bohurupee, always scheduled its shows in the Academy's theatre. The Nandikar and Nandimukh International theatre festival is organised at the venue. Productions have been staged by notable theatre personalities including Utpal Dutt, Shaoli Mitra, Soumitra Chatterjee, and Manoj Mitra. The Academy had evolved as the city's centre for public art and culture after 1961, when its status changed from a society to an institution, and the popularity of its Auditorium soared with the group theatre movement in the city.

== Present status ==
The Academy, which was once a destination for artists and theatre performers who came in the wake of Independence, defining new styles, forms, genres, and creative sensibility, has dwindled in status. The platinum jubilee of the Academy's foundation in 2008 went unnoticed and without any celebration. Today it has largely become a space for amateur artists to showcase and exhibit their works. According to Tapati Guha Thakurta, a historian and scholar of the Bengal School and its evolution, the Academy after its beginnings, and during the trusteeship of Lady Ranu was the "nerve centre" of the city, and a space for "public art culture". However, she notes it only "somehow exists today", and has been dispossessed in terms of its appeal, popularity, and prestige. The opening up of new galleries in the city, with their more market-oriented approach overshadowed the destination, and the Academy failed to keep up with the transformations in the field of art as Guha Thakurta points out. Pranab Ranjan Ray, a prominent figure in Calcutta's art circles, agrees with these observations. He mentions how at the height of its glory the Academy's theatre auditorium housed plays by Shambhu Mitra, Utpal Dutt, Shaoli Mitra, and others. The emergence of new gallery spaces, like the Centre for International Modern Art (CIMA), with an ambiance that caters to new generations and serves the interests of a wealthier, global clientele, and an organised market of buyers, artists, and curators, has disadvantaged the Academy that was known for its accessibility by multiple and wider audiences. Ignored and fallen out of favour, the Academy has to negotiate through cash-straps to maintain its functioning. The new galleries lack the art collections, which are wide-ranging, and had been gifted by Lady Ranu. This gives an edge to the Academy; however, these collections are kept locked, and away from public view. The theatre's presence still maintains the vestiges of the Academy's past aura, as the present Chairman of the Board, Prasun Mukherjee asserts. Moreover, there were rumours that significant portions of the collection had disappeared from the collections due to the approach of the present trustees which had forced them to reopen the collection, and exhibit it post-proper authentication and curation. The Academy's financial condition has also deteriorated. It barely manages to clear the wages of its staff, and requires major investments to overhaul the institution, concerted efforts to save its legacy, art collections, and its creative space, and reinvent itself as being contemporaneous and relevant before it completes its centenary in 2023.
