= Percy Brown (art historian) =

British scholar (1872–1955)

- Born: 1872; Birmingham, United Kingdom
- Died: 1955 (aged 82–83)
- Education: Royal College of Art
- Occupations: Principal of the Mayo School of Arts; Curator of the Lahore Museum; Principal of the Government School of Art in Kolkata; Secretary and curator of the Victoria and Albert Museum

Percy Brown (1872–1955) was a renowned British scholar, artist, art critic, historian and archaeologist, well known as an author on Indian architecture and art, especially for his studies on Greco-Bactrian art.

== Life and career ==
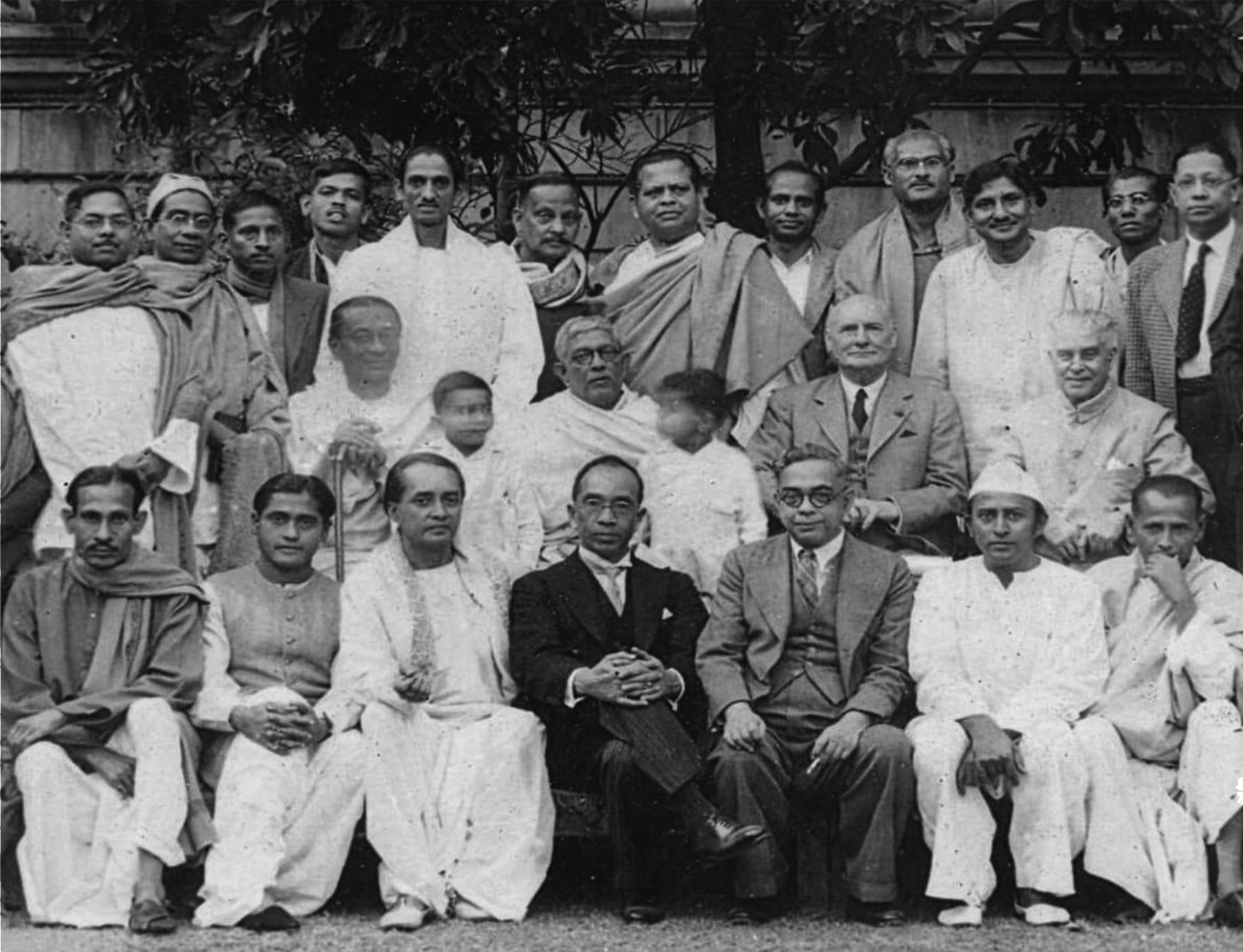
Standing third row second from right – Gobardhan Ash. Seated middle row from right second Percy Brown and third Jamini Roy. Front row from right fourth Atul Bose and other artists at the Government College of Art & Craft, 1929

Brown was born in Birmingham in 1872. He began his studies at a local art school and then studied at the Royal College of Art, where he graduated in 1898. He was part of the Indian Education Service for 28 years, from 1899 until 1927. He became principal of the Mayo School of Arts (today the National College of Arts) in Lahore and curator of the Lahore Museum. In 1909, he left Lahore to be succeeded in the position of principal of the Mayo School of Arts by Ram Singh, who held this post until 1913. The same year, he became the principal of the Government School of Art in Kolkata. He retired in 1927 and became secretary and curator of the Victoria Memorial Hall in Kolkata. He held the post until 1947 after which he spent his remaining days in Srinagar.

== Notable works ==
Brown was one of the first writers to have concentrated exclusively on Indian and Buddhist architecture. He wrote several important books on architecture and art, including the two-volume Indian Architecture (Volume I: Buddhist and Hindu Periods and Volume II: Islamic Period) in 1940. Other notable works of his include A descriptive guide to the Department of archaeology & antiquities (1908), Picturesque Nepal (1912), Indian painting (1918), and Tours in Sikhim and the Darjeeling District (1922).
