= N. R. Pillai =

Indian civil servant (1898–1992)

Sir N. R. Pillai, KCIE, CBE

Cabinet Secretary
- In office 1950–1953
- Prime Minister: Jawaharlal Nehru
- Preceded by: post established
- Succeeded by: Y. N. Sukthankar

Secretary General, Ministry of External Affairs
- In office 1953 - 1959
- Preceded by: Girija Shankar Bajpai
- Succeeded by: R. K. Nehru

5th Ambassador of India to France
- In office June 1959 - 1961
- Preceded by: K. M. Panikkar
- Succeeded by: Ali Yavar Jung

Personal details
- Born: Elenkath Narayanan Raghavan Pillai; 24 July 1898 Travancore (now in Kerala, India)
- Died: 31 March 1992 (aged 93) Kensington, London, England, United Kingdom

Sir Narayanan Raghavan Pillai, of Elenkath, KCIE, CBE (24 July 1898 – 31 March 1992), popularly known as "Rag", was an Indian civil servant, bureaucrat and statesman. He served as the first Cabinet Secretary in independent India, 1950–1953, and as the second Secretary General in the Ministry of External Affairs, He also served as India's Ambassador to France.

== Early life ==
Pillai was born in Travancore kingdom (present-day Kerala) on 24 July 1898, in a distinguished Nair family of Elankath in South Travancore. He was a matrilineal descendant of Dewan Nanoo Pillai. Elankom Gardens in Diamond Hill, Trivandrum is named after the family's town house. He read English and became a Bachelor of Arts first-class honours in 1918 from Madras University, subsequently receiving a government scholarship to study at Trinity Hall, Cambridge. There, he took the Tripos in Natural Sciences in 1921 and a Tripos in Law in 1922, both times with first-class honours.

== Career ==
=== British India ===
Joining the Indian Civil Service (ICS) in 1922, Pillai initially served in the Central Provinces as an assistant commissioner and as an officiating deputy commissioner from March–November 1927. During his career with the ICS, Pillai was appointed to various secretarial positions in the then United Provinces. He successively served as an assistant collector of customs in Madras (now Chennai, 1927–1929) and as deputy director of commercial intelligence at Kolkata (1929–1932). He was promoted to deputy secretary in March 1932, joining the Commerce Department. He was advanced to temporary joint secretary (June 1934) and to joint secretary (officiating) in February 1936, being appointed collector at Karachi in April 1936. From April 1937, he was an officer on special duty with the Commerce Department, and was appointed as a deputy commissioner in July. He was promoted to joint secretary in the Commerce Department in April 1938, to additional secretary in February 1941 and finally to full secretary in October 1942.

=== Independent India ===
Pillai served as the Commissioner General for Economic and Commercial Affairs in Europe until 1953, residing in Paris. He received an honorary doctorate from the University of Travancore in 1953. He was a founding member of the first Governing Body of NCAER, the National Council of Applied Economic Research in New Delhi, India's first economic policy institute established in 1956.

== Later life ==
During the 1960s, he served as managing director of two business firms in New Delhi, after which he emigrated to the United Kingdom in 1968. A trail of correspondence in the columns of the London Times in the 1970s or thereabouts regarding the return of the Elgin Marbles to Athens developed to include other treasures acquired by the British from various parts of their Empire and someone suggested that the legendary Koh-i-noor diamond should be returned to India. The subject was brought to a close by a letter from Pillai in which he said that, although the diamond rightfully belonged to India, he felt that Indians everywhere were happy for it to remain where it was (and still is) among the Crown Jewels.

In his last years, he resided at 26 Hans Place in Kensington, Knightsbridge. He died on 31 March 1992, just short of 94.

== Personal life ==
In 1928, he married and the couple had two sons. Nisha Pillai, the former BBC presenter, is one of his grandchildren.

== Honours ==
He was appointed Commander of the Order of the British Empire (CBE) in 1937, Companion of the Order of the Indian Empire (CIE) in the 1939 Birthday Honours and Knight Commander of the Order of the Indian Empire (KCIE) in the 1946 Birthday Honours.

Pillai was awarded the Padma Vibhushan by the Government of India in 1960, and was made an honorary Fellow of Trinity Hall, his old college, in 1970.

== Bibliography ==
- Benner, Jeffrey (2019). The Indian Foreign Policy Bureaucracy. Routledge. ISBN 978-1-00-030241-7.
