= Madhvi Parekh =

Indian artist

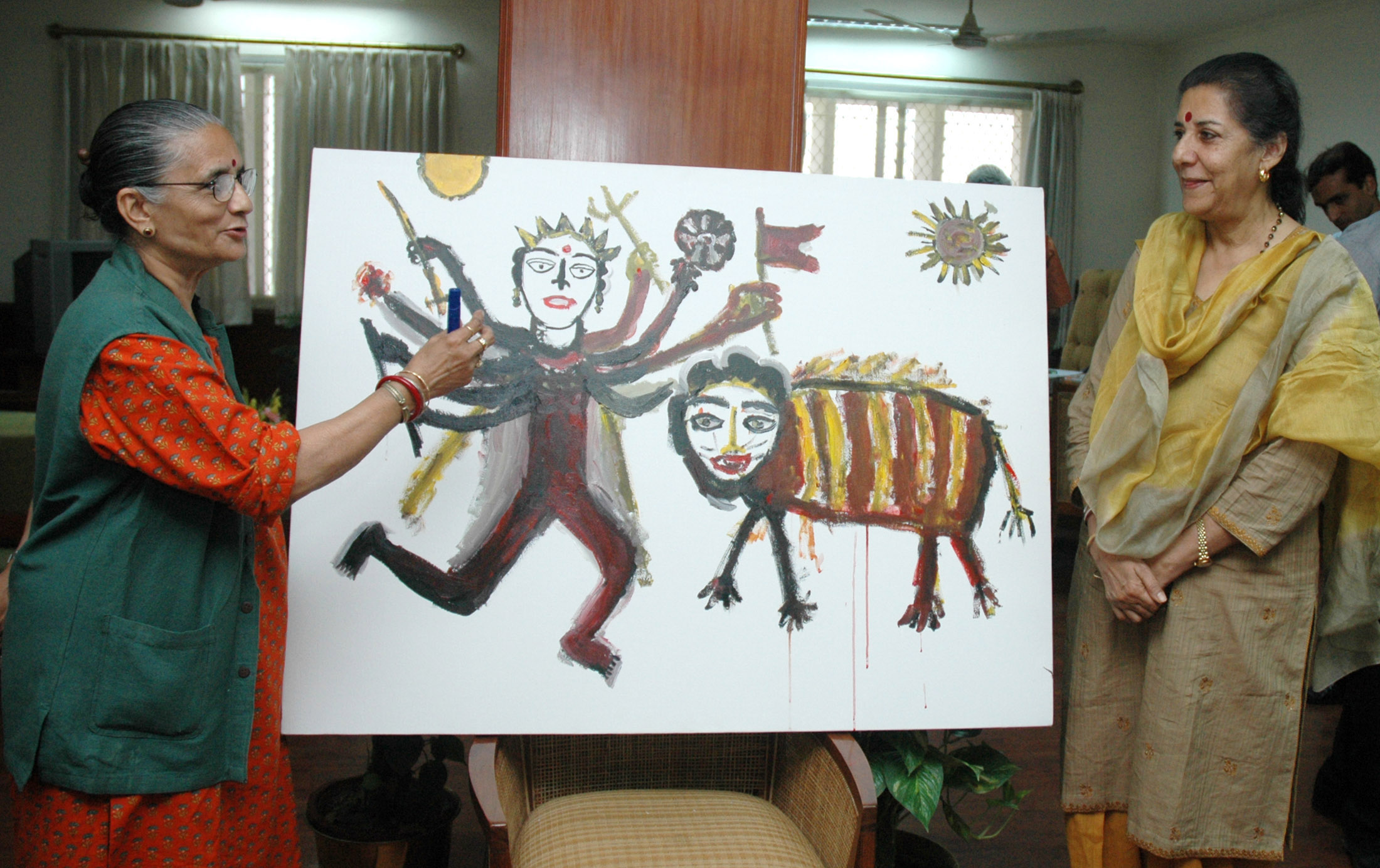
Madhvi Parekh

Madhvi Parekh (born 1942) is an Indian contemporary artist living in New Delhi.

Her work revolves around childhood memory, women’s craft, folk art and Indian myths. Although her inspirations are traditional, her style is contemporary as she was greatly influenced by Paul Klee. It represents folk art but does not draw from any one specific folk tradition.

== Early life ==
Madhvi Parekh was born in the village of Sanjaya near Ahmedabad, Gujarat where her father was a Gandhian school teacher and postmaster.

In 1957, at the age of fifteen, she married Manu Parekh, an Indian artist who studied at the JJ School of Art. They moved first to Ahmedabad, then Mumbai where she did a course in Montessori training. In 1964, they then moved to Kolkata where they lived to 1965 before moving to New Delhi.

== Career ==
Initially, Madhvi Parekh did not aspire to become an artist herself but her husband Manu inspired her to take up art. She started painting in the 1960s while pregnant with their first daughter, Manisha. In 1968, Madhvi exhibited her work for the first time at the Birla Academy in Kolkata. One of her paintings was selected to be in the annual show of Lalit Kala Akademi and then purchased by the national institution helping to launch her career. In 1973 she had her first solo show at the Chemould Art Gallery, Kolkata.

Madhvi Parekh started painting by depicting memories of her childhood and fantasy. Her paintings are vivid and surreal. She started painting in traditional folk style and later gradually moved towards oil and acrylic on canvas and watercolor on paper, which allowed her the freedom to broaden her artistic imagination as well as find a language to express her views on women, children, urban and rural.

Her daughter, Manisha Parekh is also a well noted Indian artist.

== Influences ==
Madhvi Parekh's early works have been inspired by narratives and folk stories from her childhood spent in a rural part of India. Traditional floor designs of Rangoli made art a part of everyday household ritual for Madhvi, and this morphed in the first introduction to early forms of painting. In the initial days of their married life, artist-husband, Manu Parekh gifted Madhvi a book called Pedagogical Sketchbook by Paul Klee, a Swiss German artist which formed an early influence on her style. Parekh's influences also include the Italian contemporary artist Francesco Clemente.

Beginning with many solos, Madhvi participated in notable group shows such as, Play Turkey and Yugoslavia in 1985, Watercolours by Four Women Artists, Bharat Bhavan, Bhopal in 1987 and Jehangir Art Gallery, Mumbai in 1987.

== Awards and recognition ==
Year	Award / Recognition
2017	Kailash Lalit Kala Award
2003	Whirlpool Women's Achievement in the World of Fine Art
1989-91	Government of India Senior Fellowship
1989	Fund for Artist Colones, Residency Fellowship at Fine Arts Work Center, Provincetown, MA
1989	USIA Fellowship for extensive travel in USA
1979	National Award from Lalit Kala Akademi, New Delhi
1970-72	French Government Scholarship for Fine Arts to study in Paris

== Select exhibitions ==
=== Solo ===
- The Curious Seeker I Madhvi Parekh: Retrospective, DAG Delhi, Mumbai, and New York, Sept 2017 - Oct 2019
- The Last Supper, The Seagull Foundation for the Arts in Kolkata, New Delhi, 2011

=== Group ===
- The Self and the World, presented by Gallery Espace at the National Gallery of Modern Art (NGMA), New Delhi, 1997
- Through the Looking Glass, paintings by Nalini Malani, Madhvi Parekh, Nilima Sheikh, Arpita Singh, Bhopal, New Delhi, Bombay and Bangalore, 1987 - 1989

== Publications ==
- Singh, Kishore, ed. (2017). Madhvi Parekh: The Curious Seeker, New Delhi: DAG Modern. ISBN 978-93-81217-65-8.
