= Manu Parekh =

Indian painter (born 1939)

- Born: 1939 (age 86–87); Ahmedabad, Gujarat, India
- Occupation: Painter
- Spouse: Madhvi Parekh
- Awards: Padma Shri; Lalit Kala Akademi Award; Birla Academy of Art and Culture Award; All India Fine Arts and Crafts Society Award; Silver Plaque - President of India

Manu Parekh is an Indian painter, known for his several paintings on the city of Varanasi. Reported to be influenced by Rabindranath Tagore and Ram Kinker Baij, Parekh is a recipient of the 1982 Lalit Kala Akademi Award. The Government of India awarded him the fourth highest civilian award of the Padma Shri, in 1991.

== Biography ==
Parekh was born in 1939 in Ahmedabad, in the Indian state of Gujarat and graduated in arts from the Sir Jamsetjee Jeejebhoy School of Art, Mumbai in 1962 where he had the opportunity to train under Mukund Shroff. Later he also had a short stint at the National School of Drama. Starting his career in the theatre, he worked as an actor and stage designer for one year and joined Weavers' Service Centre, Mumbai of Pupul Jayakar as art designer in 1963 where he stayed for two years. He shifted his base to Kolkata in 1965 and, in 1974, moved to New Delhi, joining Handicrafts and Handlooms Export Corporation of India as a Design Consultant. He left the corporation later to pursue his career as a freelance artist.

Parekh has had several group exhibitions and the Modern Painting exhibition at the National Gallery of Modern Art in 1982, Hirschhom Muse exhibition at the Smithsonian Institution, Washington DC the same year and the travelling exhibition, Seven Artists are some of the notable ones. Apart from the solo shows at Bose Pacia Modern in New York and at ARKS Gallery in London, Small Drawings at Sophia Duchesne Art Gallery, Mumbai in 1991, Ritual Oblations at Rabindra Bhavan, New Delhi in 1999, Portraits of Flower and Landscapes of River at Jehangir Art Gallery and Tao Art Gallery, Mumbai, in 2003, Banaras at Vadehra Art Gallery, in 2004 and Banaras – Eternity Watches Time at Jehangir Art Gallery, Mumbai, in 2007 were the notable among his exhibitions. He has participated in two Triennales in India in 1975 and 1978 and HelpAge India has utilised his works for mobilising funds by presenting them at auctions at Sotheby's, Bombay in 1989 and Andasprey (U.K.) in 1991.

Parekh has served as the Exhibition Commissioner for Madhubani Painting show in Italy and Denmark and Contemporary Indian Painting at the Festival of India at Stockholm in 1987. After the Birla Academy of Art and Culture award of 1971, he received the All India Fine Arts and Crafts Society (AIFACS) award and the Silver Plaque of the President of India in 1972. AIFACS award came his way once more in 1974 and in 1982, he received the National Art Award from the Lalit Kala Akademi. Birla Academy of Art and Culture, Calcutta honoured him again in 1991 and the Government of India included him in the Republic Day Honours list, the same year, for the civilian honour of the Padma Shri.

Parekh is married to well known contemporary artist Madhvi. The couple has been living in New Delhi ever since1974.

== See also ==
- Sir Jamsetjee Jeejebhoy School of Art
- All India Fine Arts and Crafts Society
