= Delhi Art Gallery =

Art house based in India

DAG (Delhi Art Gallery)
- Formerly: Delhi Art Gallery
- Company type: Art gallery
- Founded: 1993
- Founder: Rama Anand
- Headquarters: New Delhi
- Key people: Ashish Anand (MD & CEO)
- Website: dagworld.com

DAG, previously known as Delhi Art Gallery, is an art gallery based out of New Delhi, Mumbai and New York. Started in 1993 in Hauz Khas by Rama Anand, DAG showcases modern Indian artists like Raja Ravi Verma, Jamini Roy, Amrita Sher-Gil, SH Raza among others.

== History ==
DAG, started in Hauz Khas village in 1993 by Rama Anand, and is currently managed by her son Ashish Anand. The art-house owns and operates galleries and museums in New Delhi, Kolkata, Mumbai, and New York. It also caters to archives, publications, and public outreach.

The initiative, which was initially named Delhi Art Gallery, started when the Anand family moved from Amritsar to Delhi during Punjab's militancy phase in the 1980s. Rama, an art enthusiast, started the gallery, but her son Ashish took over in 1996, after dropping out of high school. Ashish, who was ready to join the garments business, organically developed an interest in art and spent the next decades amassing the most formidable collection of Modern Indian art and working on making DAG accessible, building its presence in multiple cities in India and elsewhere, and launching a museum in collaboration with the Archeological Survey of India called Drishyakala in Red Fort and Ghare Baire in Kolkatta.

== Museums and gallery ==
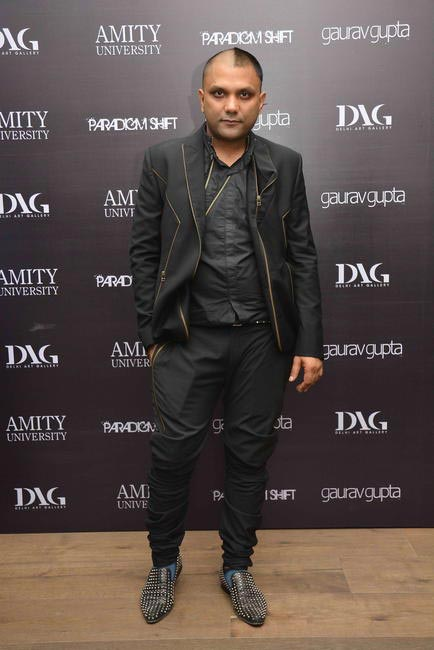
Gaurav Gupta label exhibition co-curated by DAG

In 2015, DAG opened gallery in Fuller Building gallery in New York, retrospecting on artist Madhvi Parekh.

In 2019, DAG, in collaboration with Archeological Survey of India (ASI), established Drishyakala Art Museum in Red Fort, Delhi. Designed by Adrien Gardère, the museum displays 400 artworks through 4 exhibitions: Thomas and William Daniells’ colonial landscapes and aquatints; Popular prints; Portraits; and India's National Treasure Artists.

In 2019, DAG, in collaboration with Ministry of Textiles, organized multi-artist exhibition titled Eternal Banaras in Varanasi.

In 2020, DAG, in collaboration with the National Gallery of Modern Art and the Ministry of Culture, presented an exhibition featuring 200 years of Bengal's art history via 700 artworks spread across twelve galleries. This exhibition, known as Ghare-Baire, inspired by Tagore's novel of the same name (which translates as 'the home and the world'), was hosted at the colonial-era Currency Building in Kolkata, from January 2020 to November 2021. Although the museum exhibition was shut down temporarily in between owing to the COVID-19 pandemic, it successfully popularised and promoted the development of art in Bengal during the colonial period to the emergence of artists and unique art forms in the late and post-colonial era. From showcasing travelling European artists in Bengal to featuring the evolution of native artists, DAG was able to exhibit diverse schools of art found in the erstwhile Bengal presidency. Company paintings, Early Bengal paintings, and Kalighat patachitra are some of the styles that were presented as part of the exhibition. This was the "largest collection of Bengal art on public display anywhere in the world."

In August 2022, DAG, in collaboration with the Ministry of Culture, housed an exhibition in the Indian Museum, Kolkata, and later in Delhi to showcase India's anti-colonial struggle and independence movement. This exhibition titled March to Freedom: Reflections on India's Independence was also in light of India's 75 years of independence.

In April 2023, DAG announced "about acquiring the 75-year-old Jamini Roy house in Kolkata and its plans to open India’s first private single-artist museum" in April 2024. Inspired by the Frida Kahlo Museum in Mexico, this initiative aims to document the works of artist Jamini Roy in his house, which was also his studio, located in Kolkata's Ballygunge Place. The upcoming Jamini Roy Museum, in this "three-storeyed spread over 7,000 sqft house, would also include a resource centre, library, museum shop, and a cafe." The ground floor of the house will illustrate DAG's wide-ranging collections of Roy's paintings, whereas the courtyards and terrace would be used as spaces to host workshops and a place for visitors to eat.

In June 2023, DAG organised an exhibition in Delhi titled The Babu and The Bazaar. This presentation promoted artworks "of exquisite oil paintings, pat watercolours, prints and reverse paintings from the 19th and early 20th Century that drew inspiration from everywhere while remaining local in technique."
