= Ranu Mukherjee (art patron) =

Indian art patron (1907 – 2000)

Ranu Mukherjee (born Priti Adhikary; 1907–2000) was an Indian patron of the arts. She was associated with Rabindranath Tagore during the later years of his life and established the Academy of Fine Arts, Kolkata.

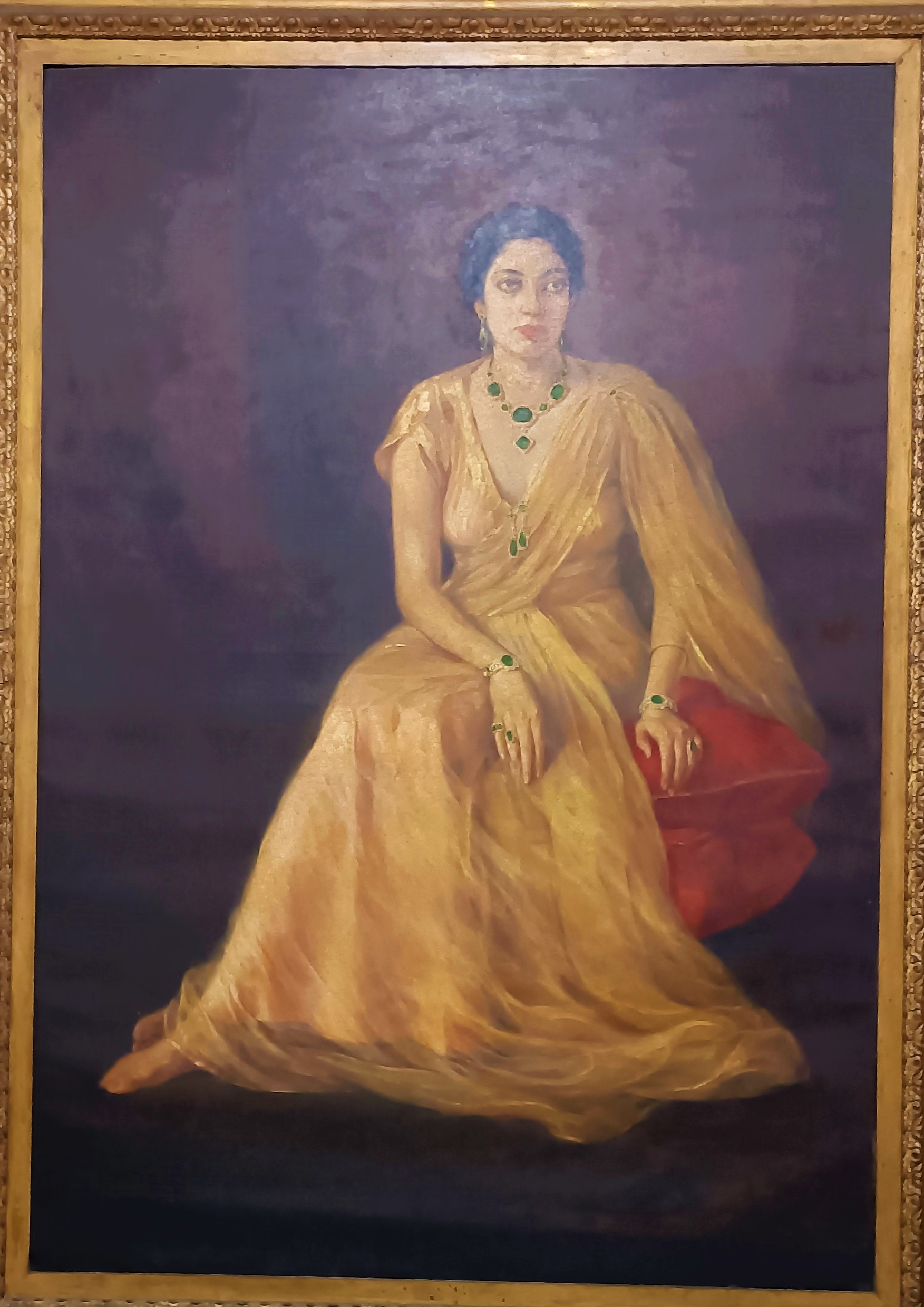
Lady Ranu Mukherjee. Portrait by Atul Bose.

== Early life ==
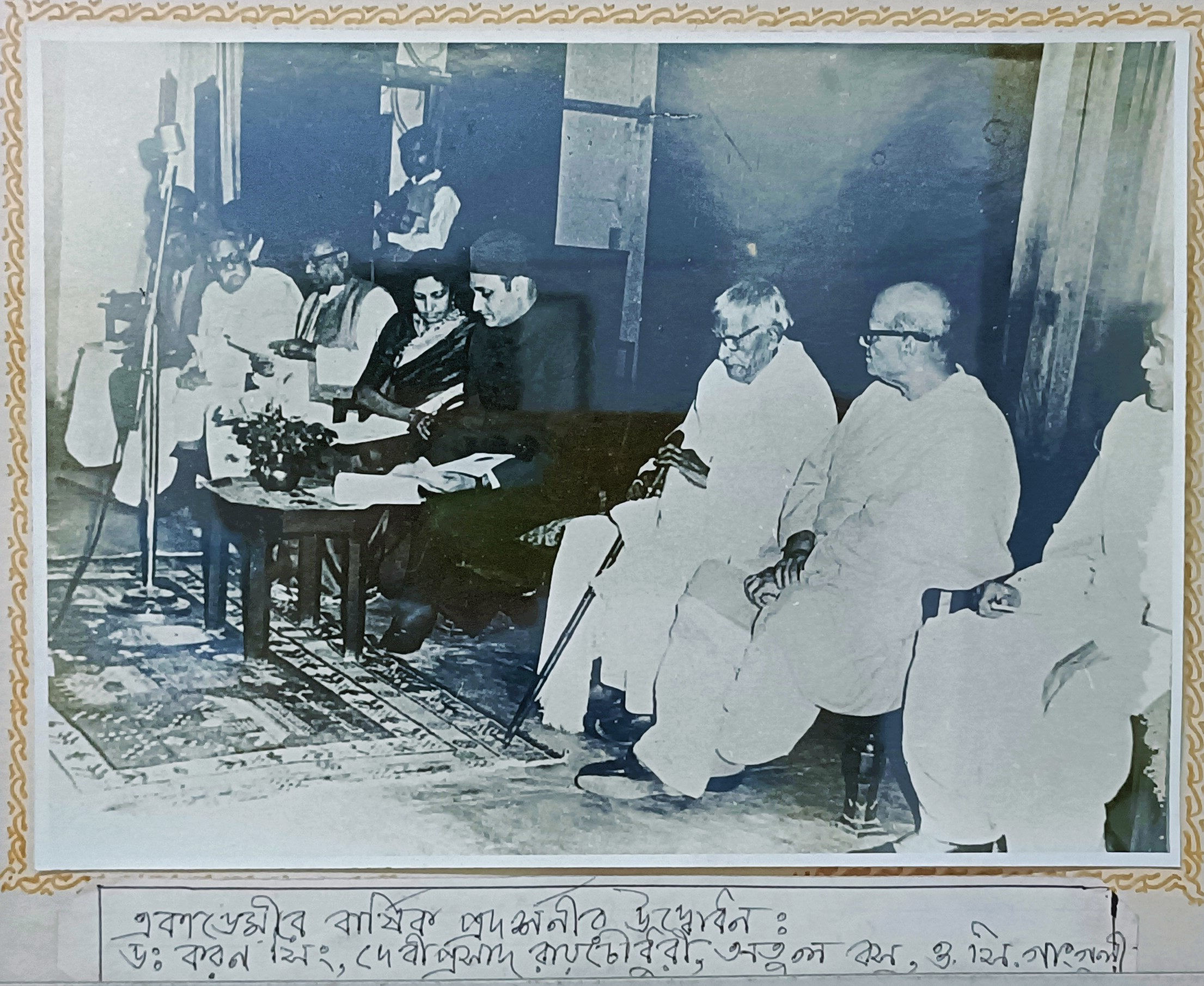
Lady Ranu at the annual exhibition of the Academy with Dr. Karan Singh, Debiprasad Chowdhury, Atul Bose, and O.C. Ganguly.

Born as Priti Adhikary, Ranu Mukherjee's ancestral home was in Tungi village in the Nadia of British Bengal. She was born on 18 October 1907, in Varanasi, Uttar Pradesh.

== Relationship with Tagore ==
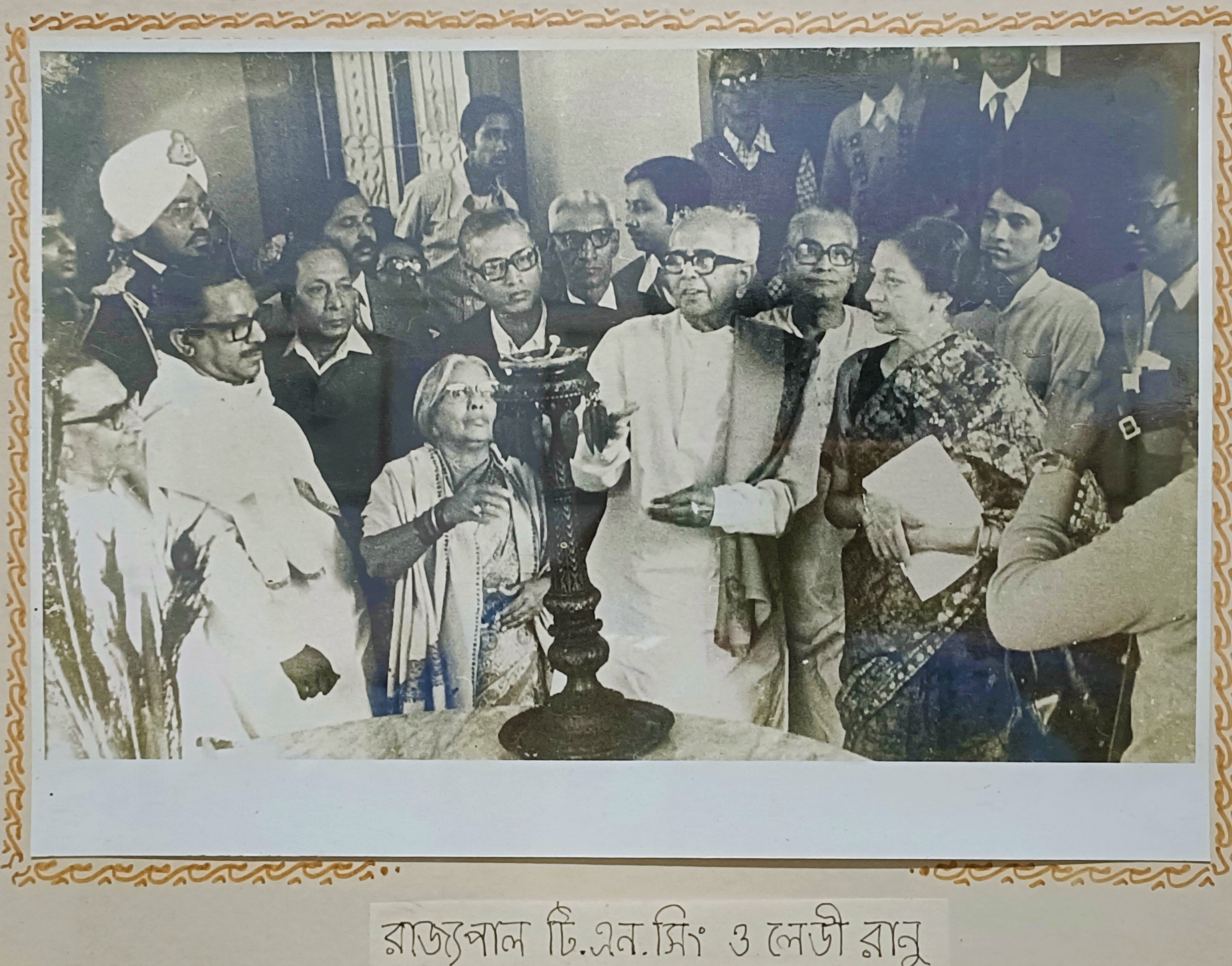
Lady Ranu with the then Governor T.N. Singh.

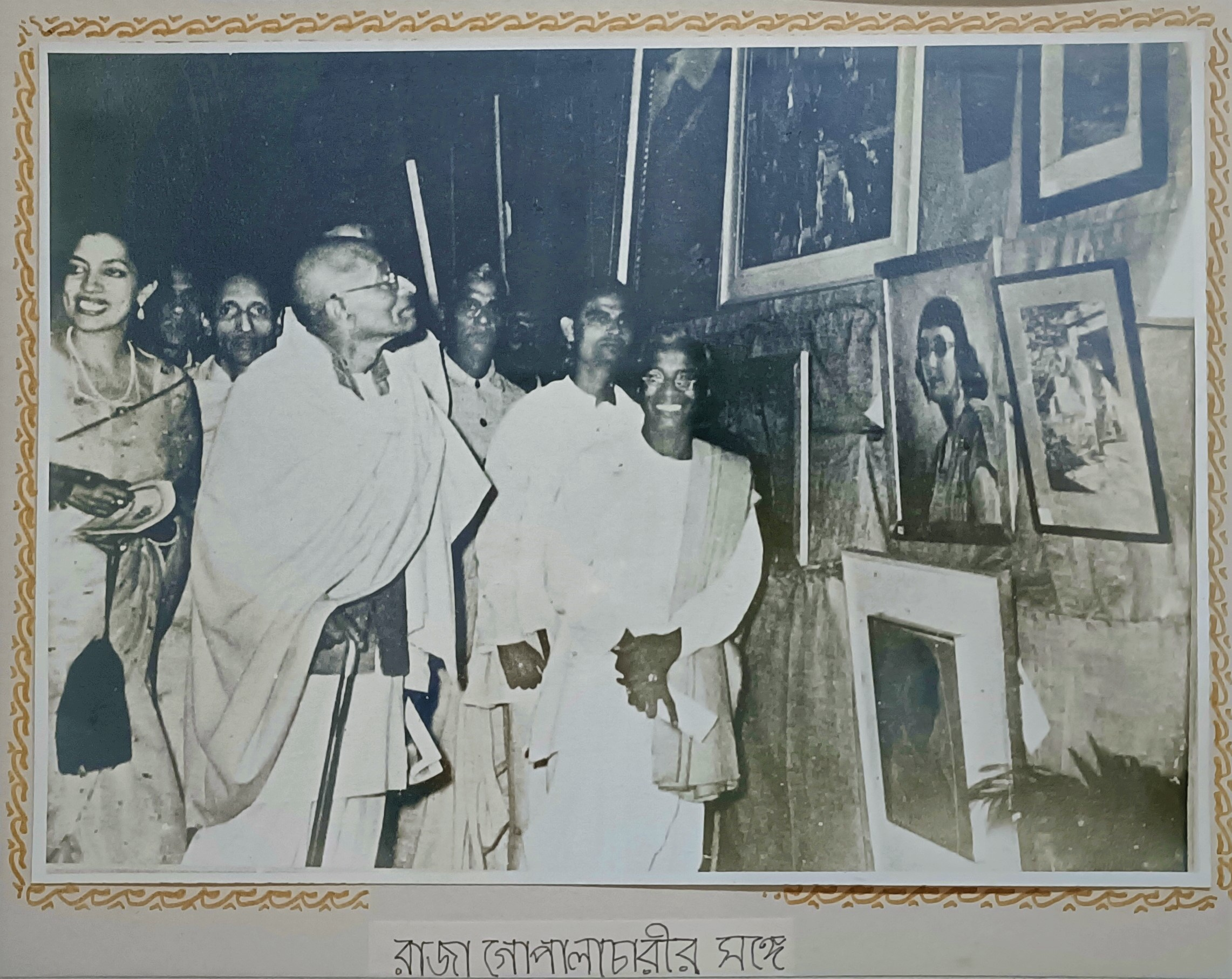
Lady Ranu with Raja Gopalachari.

By the age of 11, Ranu had read a collection of Tagore's short stories (Golpoguccha). She was a student at the Theosophical School in Kashi.

In 1918, Tagore invited Ranu's father to work with Kshitimohan Sen at Shantiniketan's Vidya Bhavana. Ranu’s elder sister, Asha Aryanayakam, and her husband were already living at the Shantiniketan Ashrama. Having read Tagore's works—such as Gora, Noukadubi, Chinnapatra, and Dakghar—Ranu also moved there. During her time at Shantiniketan, she was mentored by renowned artists Nandalal Bose and Surendranath Kar.

She developed a close relationship with Tagore, having previously exchanged letters with him from Varanasi as an avid reader of his works. She affectionately called him “Bhanudada,” a name inspired by Tagore's pseudonym Bhanusingha, used for his poems in Bhanusingha Thakurer Padabali. Sources suggest that this relationship blossomed at a time when Tagore was grieving the loss of his daughter Madhurilata and managing financial concerns for Santiniketan.

Some sources describe Ranu as a source of inspiration for Tagore, drawing comparisons to his earlier muse, Kadambari Devi. Their relationship—documented in 208 letters from Tagore to Ranu and 68 letters from Ranu to Tagore—was reportedly misunderstood by some at the time. The letters reveal the significant influence Ranu, then only 12 years old, had on Tagore. She also accompanied him on various travels, including a trip to Shillong, where he composed Shesher Kobita.

In 1920, when Tagore’s play Bisarjan was staged at the Empire Hall, Tagore played the role of Jayasingha while Ranu Mukherjee portrayed Aparna.

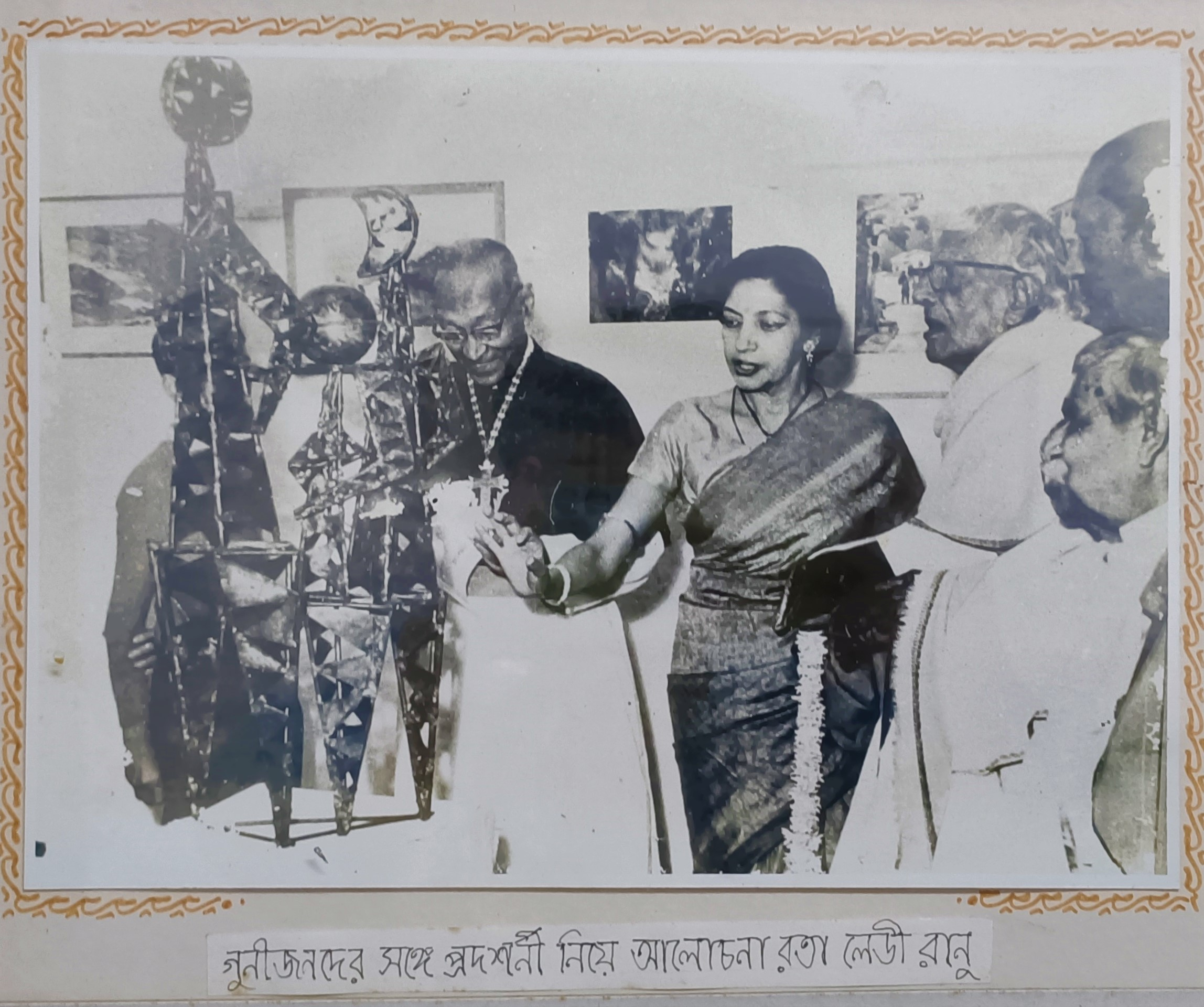
Lady Ranu with eminent personalities during an exhibition.

== Personal life ==
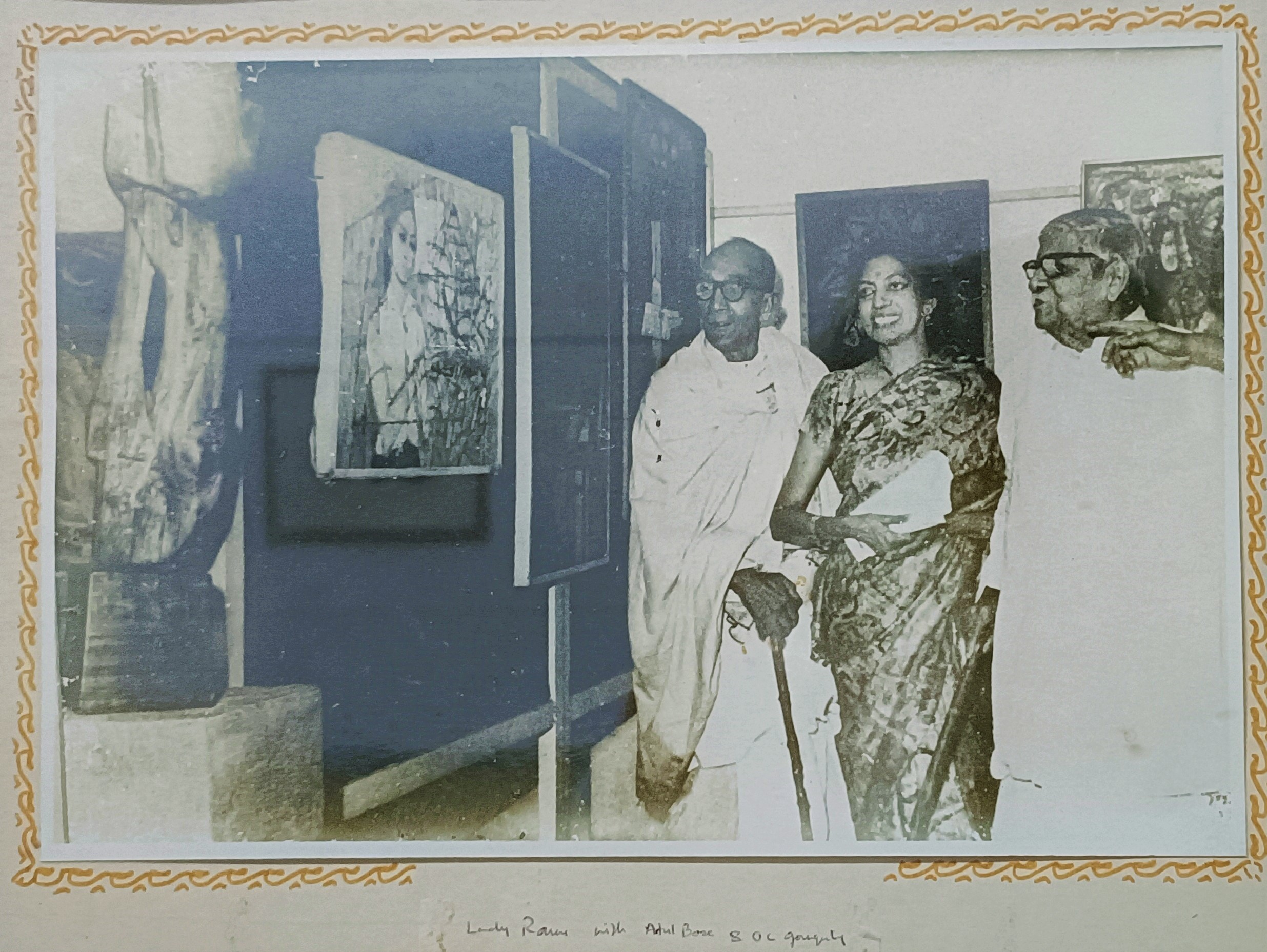
Lady Ranu with Atul Bose and O.C. Ganguly.

In 1925, Ranu married Sir Birendranath Mookerjee, an Indian industrialist. Gaining an appreciation for art and culture under Tagore's mentorship at the Shantiniketan school, she became known as Lady Ranu Mukherjee. After her marriage, Ranu's relationship with Tagore changed. Tagore acknowledged the shift in their connection, writing: "Ranu, please do not call me Bhanu Dada any more. Bhanu Singha is lost forever. He cannot be brought back."

== Legacy and contributions ==
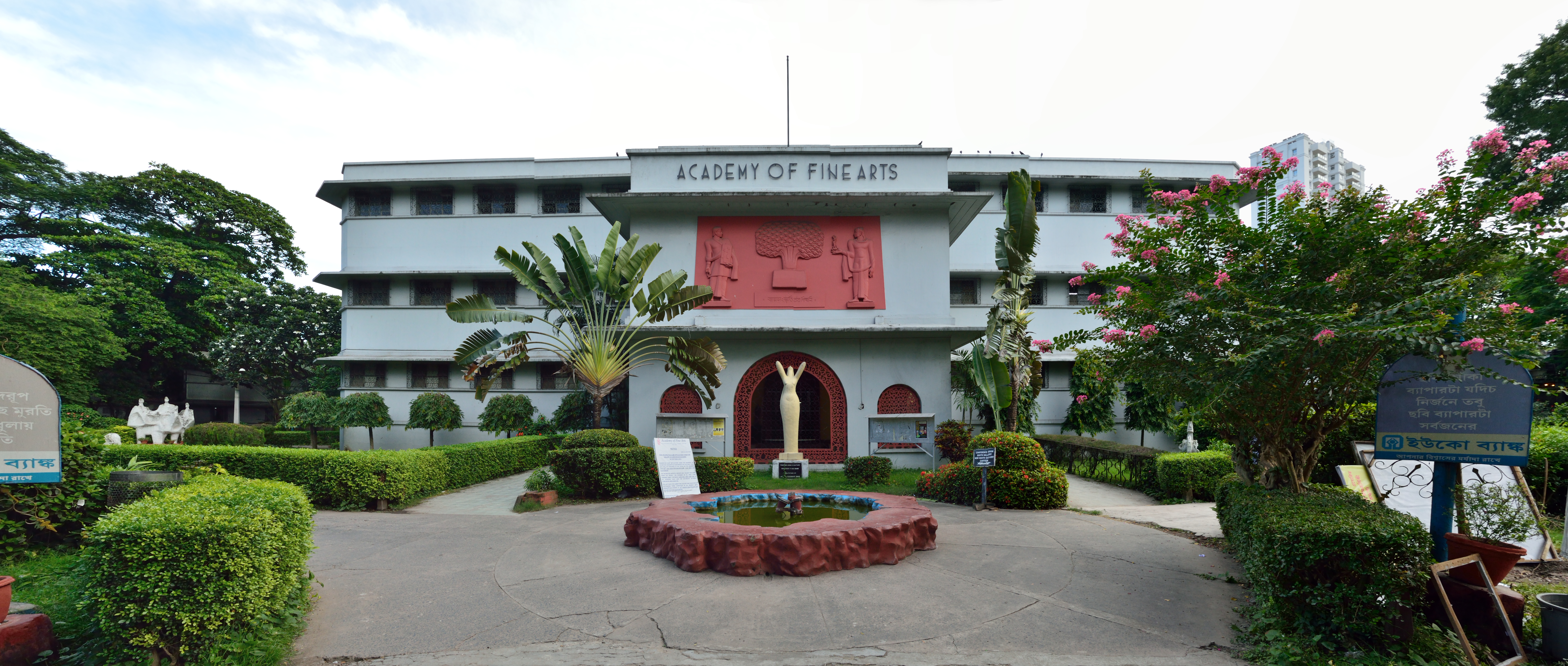
Academy of Fine Arts.

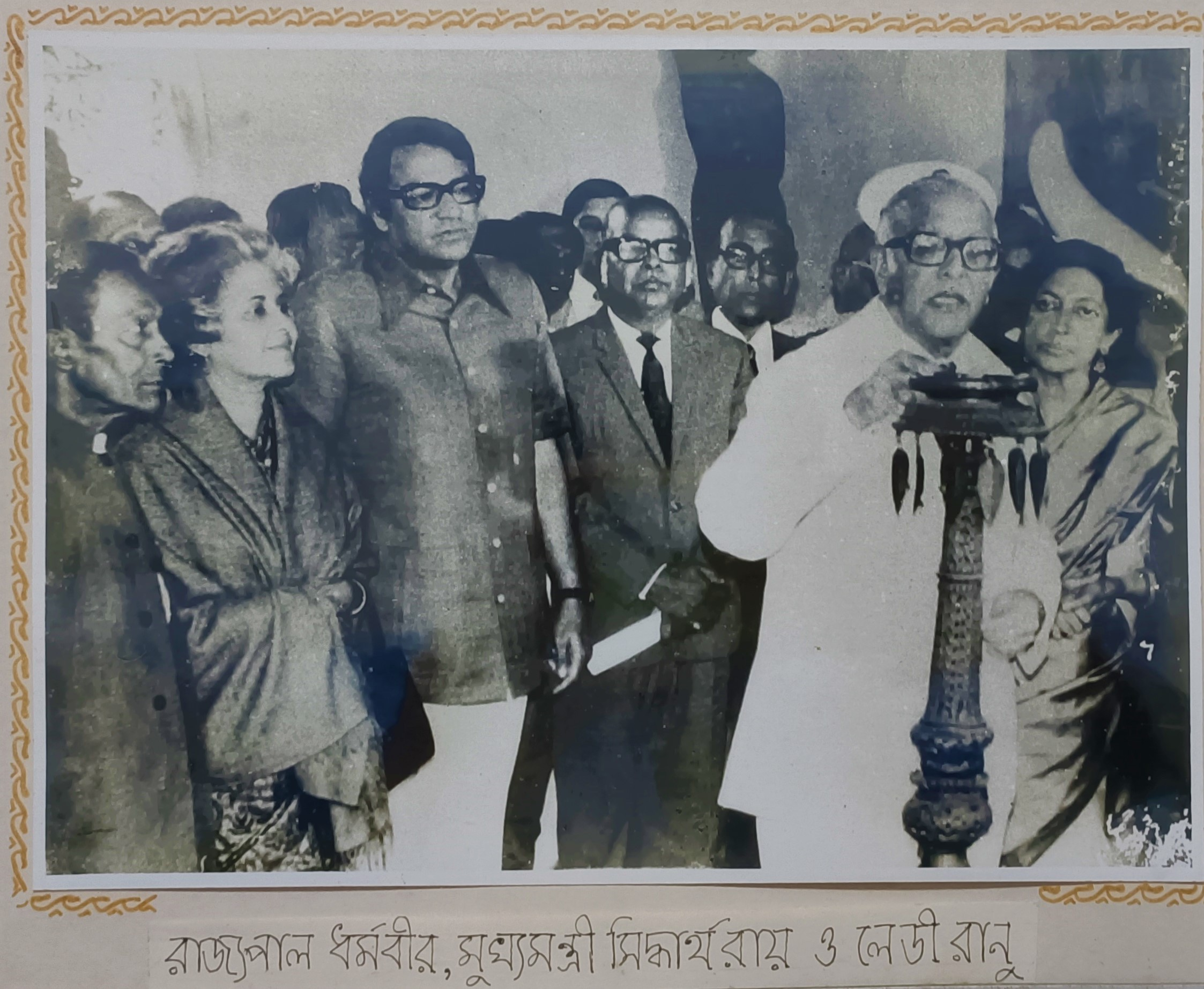
Lady Ranu with the then governor Dharma Vira, and Chief Minister Siddharth Ray.

Lady Ranu Mukherjee founded the Academy of Fine Arts in Kolkata in 1933; construction of the present building began around 1952. She contributed paintings and artworks from her family collection, which she had inherited, to the Academy. The collection Rabindra Gallery included her photographs from the time at Shantiniketan and manuscripts of Tagore's poems Bhanusingha Thakurer Padabali. In this initiative, she was supported by the then chief minister of Bengal, Bidhan Chandra Roy, and her husband, Sir Birendranath Mukherjee. The Academy developed into an institution for arts and culture. She remained the President of the Academy until 1997. She also maintained connections with prominent institutions such as Lalit Kala Academy, Indian Museum in Kolkata, Calcutta University, Banaras Hindu University, Asiatic Society, and Rabindra Bharati University.

== Death ==
Ranu Mukherjee died on 15 March 2000.
