= List of National Treasures of India =

This is a list of List of National Treasures of India' also known as Nine Masters, as named by the Antiquities and Art Treasures Act (1972).

== Artists ==
List of National Treasures of India
Name	Image	Notes
Nandalal Bose		
Nicholas Roerich		
Amrita Sher-Gil		
Sailoz Mookherjea		
Jamini Roy		
Abanindranath Tagore		
Gaganendranath Tagore		
Rabindranath Tagore		
Raja Ravi Varma		
