= Jamini Roy Museum =

Upcoming museum in Kolkata, India

The Jamini Roy Museum is a planned museum located in the former residence of artist Jamini Roy. In early 2023, DAG (formerly, the Delhi Art Gallery) acquired Roy's residence – a 75 year old structure located in Ballygunge, Kolkata. The house would be turned into a modern museum opening the doors to the creative world of Jamini Roy.

Regarded as India's first privately owned single-artist museum, DAG is aiming to complete the project by 2024. The museum will have a rotational show and a cafe with a modern ambience. Additionally, it will function as a landmark for artists and tourists from across India and the world, helping to preserve Jamini Roy's work and legacy. Prominent examples of this type of museum from across the world include the Munch Museum in Norway created at the site where Edvard Munch lived and worked, the Frida Kahlo Museum in Mexico, and the Foundation Claude Monet in France.

== History ==
In 1949, Jamini Roy had shifted from his erstwhile house at Baghbazar to the new residence in Ballygunge, which was designed and conceived by himself and his son Amiya. He lived and continued to work here in his studio till his death in 1972. The house was open to all people, and distinguished personalities of the time would then come to visit and interact with the artist. The house had seen visitors like Rabindranath Tagore, Sarojini Naidu, Indira Gandhi along with Rajiv and Sanjay Gandhi, former chief ministers of West Bengal Siddhartha Shankar Roy, Jyoti Basu, and Buddhadeb Bhattacharya, and other dignitaries from across the world.

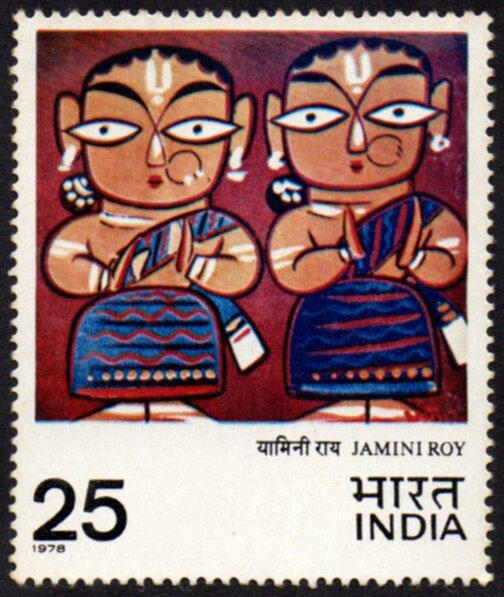
Stamp of India - 1978 - Colnect 326685 - Jamini Roy

One of the most significant events in the household was the Bengali New Year celebrations, that coincided with the artist's birthday. On that day, several visitors including neighbours, and guests, came to the house and were served a special sherbet, sweets and shingara. All were treated equally and offered wooden stools with a sheet of paper for cushion.

== The plan ==
A DAG note outlines how the ground floor was reserved as the studio space for the artist, while there were separate entrances to the private spaces upstairs where the family members lived. The house covering an area of 7,284 sq. ft. has a distinct feature of the staircase with glass panels stretched from the entrance to the terrace. The grilles on the green slatted windows have a diamond motif designed by the artist himself. The family had rented the ground floor to a bank which had led to major alterations in the studio space.

After the property was acquired, DAG proposed to restore the ground floor to the original studio format of the artist, while the first and the second floors would be converted into galleries devoted to exhibitions curated around Roy's life and art. For instance, the "Christ room" where the artist displayed works from his famous Christ series would once again be recreated giving the viewers a taste of art history. The museum would be designed by leading conservation architects and designers. There would also be a library, a resource centre, and a museum shop. The ample open spaces would be utilised for conducting workshops, and live performances. Ashish Anand, the CEO and managing director of DAG, asserted that this would the company's single most important project. The project has been inspired by Casa Azul, the place designed and dedicated to Frida Kahlo in Mexico. The aim of the house-museum is to retain the unique modernist swadeshi idiom that was typical of Roy's works. The family members who were finding it difficult to maintain the lavish property said that their "collective prayers were answered" when DAG approached them to acquire the museum and convert it into a museum.
