= Jamini Roy =

Indian artist (1887–1972)

- Born: 11 April 1887; Beliatore, Bengal Presidency, British India
- Died: 24 April 1972 (aged 85); Calcutta, West Bengal, India
- Education: Government College of Art, Kolkata
- Known for: Painting
- Movement: Bengal school
- Awards: Padma Bhushan (1954); Lalit Kala Akademi Fellowship (1955)

Jamini Roy (11 April 1887 – 24 April 1972) was an Indian painter and a leading figure in twentieth-century Indian modern art. He studied at the Government School of Art in Calcutta under Abanindranath Tagore, the founder of Bengal school of art, and remains one of his most famous pupils. Roy's highly simplified, flattened-out style, and reminiscent of European modern art was influenced by the Kalighat painting and “bazaar” paintings sold at Indian temples as talismans.

Roy's paintings gained widespread recognition during the 1930s and 1940s, and his works were exhibited in London in 1946 and New York in 1953. He received the Padma Bhushan in 1954 and became the first Fellow of the Lalit Kala Akademi in 1955. In 1976, his works were included among those of the Nine Masters, whose paintings were designated national art treasures by the Government of India.

== Early life and background ==
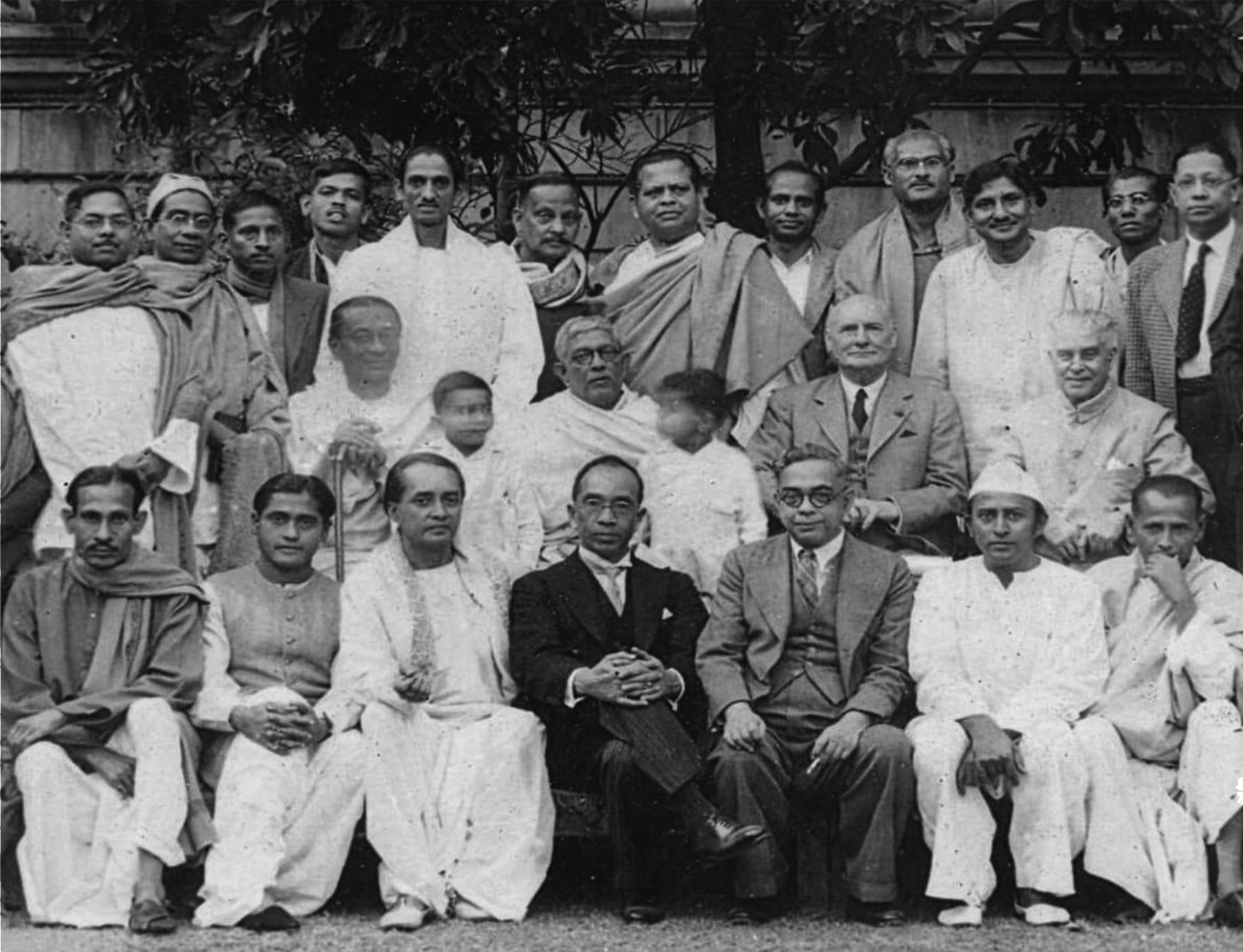
Standing third row, second from right – Gobardhan Ash. Seated middle row from right second Percy Brown and third Jamini Roy]. Front row from right fourth Atul Bose and other artists at the Government College of Art & Craft, 1929

Jamini Roy was born on 11 April 1887 into a moderately prosperous Kayastha family of land-owners in Beliatore village of the Bankura district, West Bengal. He was raised in an average middle-class, art loving household which ultimately influenced his future decisions.

When he was sixteen, he was sent to study at the Government College of Art, Kolkata. Abanindranath Tagore, the founder of Bengal school was vice-principal at the institution. He was taught to paint in the prevailing academic tradition drawing Classical nudes and painting in oils and in 1908 he received his Diploma in Fine Art.

However, the principal E.B. Havell's influence, and Rabindranath Tagore's decisive lecture brought him to a realization that he needed to draw inspiration, not from Western traditions, but from his own culture, and so he looked to the living folk and tribal art for inspiration. He was most influenced by the Kalighat Pat (Kalighat painting), which was a style of art with bold sweeping brush-strokes. He moved away from his earlier impressionist landscapes and portraits and between 1921 and 1924 began his first period of experimentation with the Santhal dance as his starting point. Jamini Roy had 4 sons and 1 daughter.

== Style ==
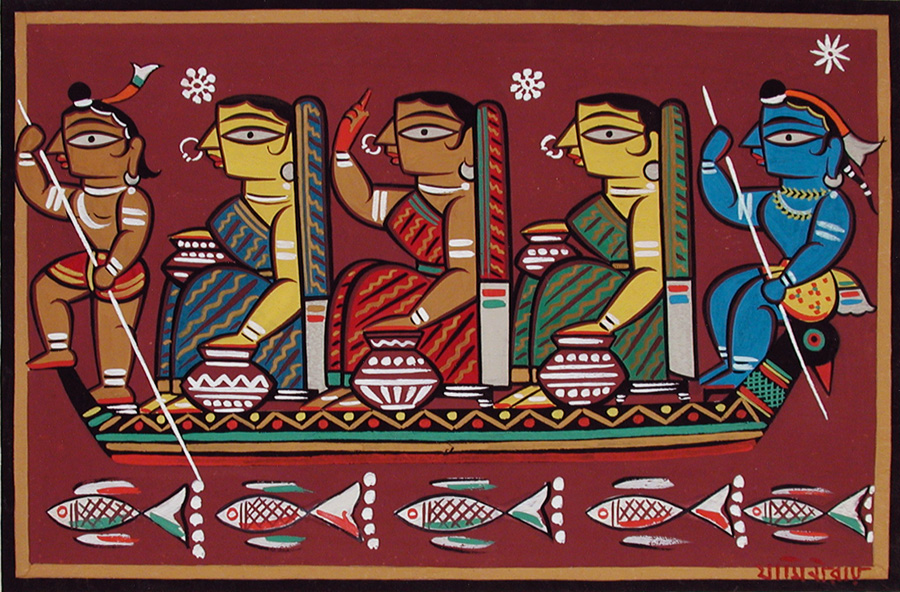
Jamini Roy painting - Boating

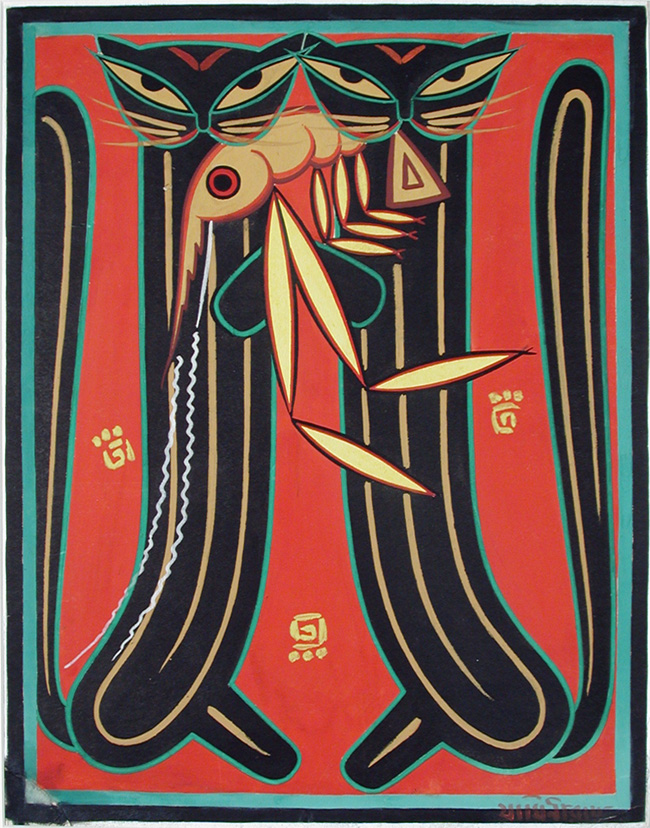
Jamini Roy painting - Two cats holding a large prawn

Roy began his career as a commissioned portrait painter. Somewhat abruptly in the early 1920s, he gave up commissioned portrait painting in an effort to discover his own.

Roy changed style from his academic Western training and featured a new style based on Bengali folk traditions.

Roy is also described as an art machine because he produced 20,000 paintings in his lifetime which is about 10 paintings daily but made sure his artistic aims remained the same. He always targeted to the ordinary middle class as the upholder of art however he was thronged by the rich. Keeping his respect to the middle class reflected on his critical views; he believed that ordinary people were more important than governments because they were the voice of his art.

His underlying quest was threefold: to capture the essence of simplicity embodied in the life of the folk people; to make art accessible to a wider section of people; and to give Indian art its own identity. From 1918 onwards, he began painting the lives of rural and tribal people in watercolours and sometimes in oils.

He also used indigenous materials like lamp black, organic tempera, earth and mineral pigments to paint.

Jamini Roy's paintings were put on exhibition for the first time in the British India Street of Calcutta (Kolkata) in 1938. During the 1940s, his popularity touched new highs, with the Bengali middle class and the European community becoming his main clientele. In 1946, his work was exhibited in London and in 1953, in New York. He was awarded the Padma Bhushan in 1954. His work has been exhibited extensively in international exhibitions and can be found in many private and public collections such as the Victoria and Albert Museum, London. He spent most of his life living and working in Calcutta. Initially he experimented with Kalighat paintings but found that it has ceased to be strictly a "patua" and went to learn from village patuas. Consequently, his techniques as well as subject matter was influenced by traditional art of Bengal. He preferred himself to be called a patua. Jamini Roy died in 1972. He was survived by four sons and a daughter. Currently his successors (daughters-in-law and grand children and their children) stay at the home he had built in Ballygunge Place, Kolkata. His works can be found in various museums and galleries across the globe.

== Awards ==
In 1934, he received a Viceroy's gold medal in an all India exhibition for one of his work. In 1954 he was awarded the Padma Bhushan by the Government of India, the third highest award a civilian can be given. In 1956, he was made the second Fellow of the Lalit Kala Akademi, the highest honour in the fine arts conferred by the Lalit Kala Akademi, India's National Academy of Art, Government of India.

== Critical views ==
In 1929 while inaugurating Roy's exhibition sponsored by Mukul Dey at Calcutta, the then Statesman Editor Sir Alfred Watson said:

…Those who study the various pictures will be able to trace the development of the mind of an artist constantly seeking his own mode of expression. His earlier work done under purely Western influence and consisting largely of small copies of larger works must be regarded as the exercises of one learning to use the tools of his craft competently and never quite at ease with his models. From this phase we see him gradually breaking away to a style of his own.

You must judge for yourselves how far Mr. Roy has been able to achieve the ends at which he is obviously aiming. His work will repay study. I see in it as I see in much of the painting in India today a real endeavour to recover a national art that shall be free from the sophisticated tradition of other countries, which have had a continuous art history. The work of those who are endeavouring to revive Indian art is commonly not appreciated in its true significance. It is sometimes assumed that revival means no more than a return to the methods and traditions of the past. That would be to create a school of copyists without visions and ideals of their own.

… Art in any form cannot progress without encouragement. The artist must live and he must live by the sale of his work. In India as elsewhere the days when the churches and the princes were the patrons of art have passed. Encouragement today must come from a wider circle. I would say to those who have money to spare buy Indian art with courage. You may obtain some things of little worth; you may, on the other hand, acquire cheaply something that is destined to have great value. What does it matter whether you make mistakes or not. By encouraging those who are striving to give in line and colour a fresh expression to Indian thought you are helping forward a movement that we all hope is destined to add a fresh lustre to the country.

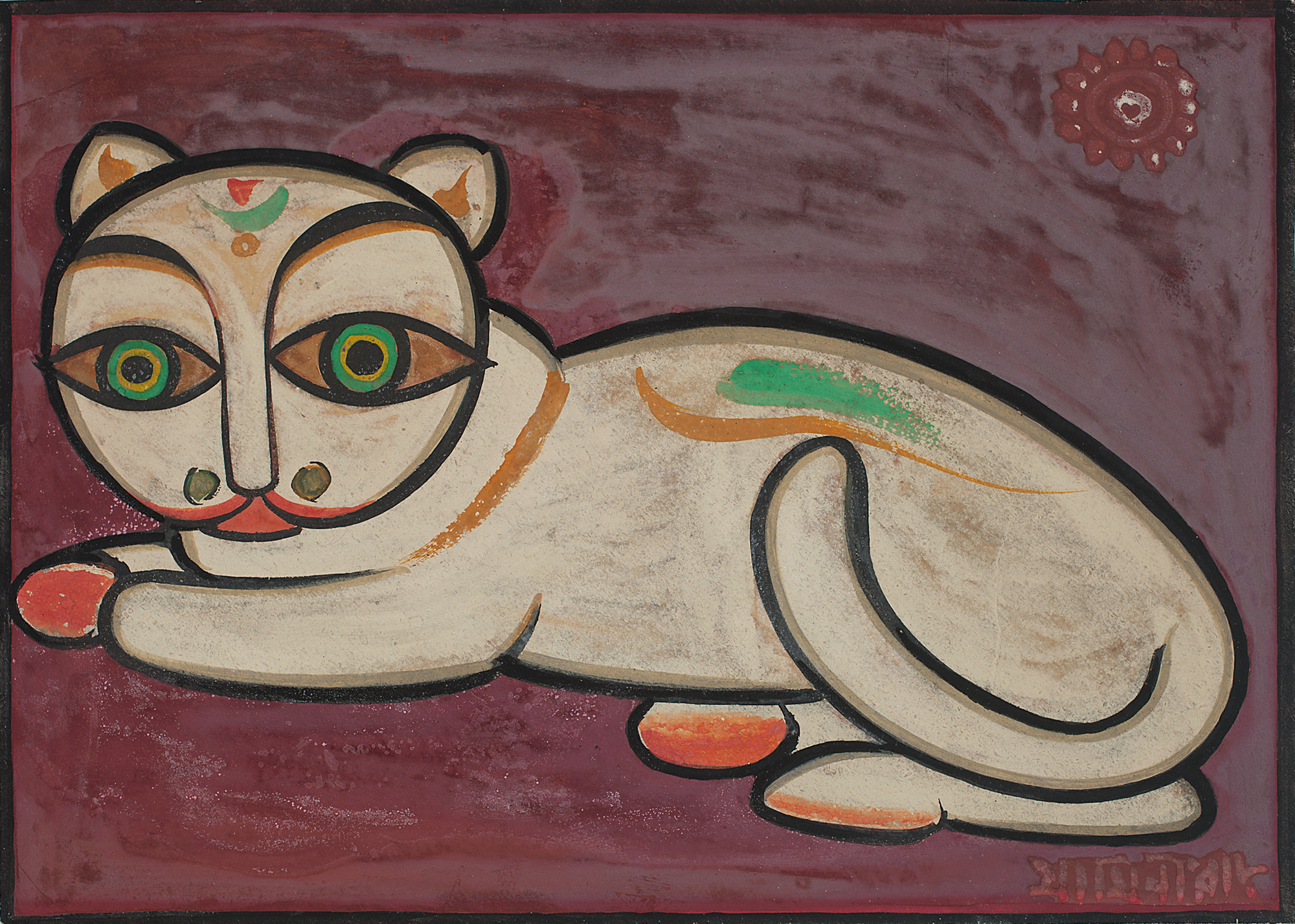
Untitled, c. 1920s-50s, Tempera on boxboard, DAG Museums

== Key works ==
Jamini Roy – Mother and Child, oil on canvas, mid 1920. National Gallery of Modern Art collection

- "Ramayana", 1946, Spread across 17 canvases (106 × 76 cm, each) Roy's Ramayana is considered to be his magnum opus. Patronized by Sarada Charan Das, Roy created this masterpiece series in Kalighat pata style with natural colors, using earth, chalk powder and vegetable colors instead of dyes. Later Roy also created individual replicas capturing various moments from the entire series. Some of these paintings have been preserved in the National Art Gallery of India and are also in display in the Victoria Memorial Hall. His story of Ramayana begins with sage Valmiki and completes the circle back to his hermitage after Sita's aagnipariksha. All his 17 canvases are frequently characterized by decorative flowers, landscape, birds and animals typical of the Bengal School of Art. His lines are simple, bold and roundish initially derived from clay images but they lead to complex moments rendering subtle yet powerful emotions. Jamini Roy's complete “Ramayana” is on display today at Sarada Charan Das' residence "Rossogolla Bhavan" in Kolkata along with 8 other large-scale originals. The Das residence today harbours the largest private collection of Jamini Roy paintings with 25 of the master's originals.
- "Bride and two Companions", 1952, tempera on card, 75 x 39 cm. Coates described the painting: "Note the magnificent indigo of Bengal, and how the palms of the bride's hands are smeared with red sandalpaste. Jamini Roy's choice of colours looks at first sight purely decorative. In fact, nearly every thing in his pictures has a reason and a meaning." It is very flat and heavily outlined. Roy portrays a traditional woman without the artificial beauty and the mythological background portraying the folk-art inspiration that has always been present since his beginnings.
- "Dual Cats with one Crayfish", 1968, tempera on card, 55.5 x 44 cm. Coates wrote: "Yet another new style, colours reduced in number and very restrained, an almost overwhelming sense of formality."

== Death and legacy ==
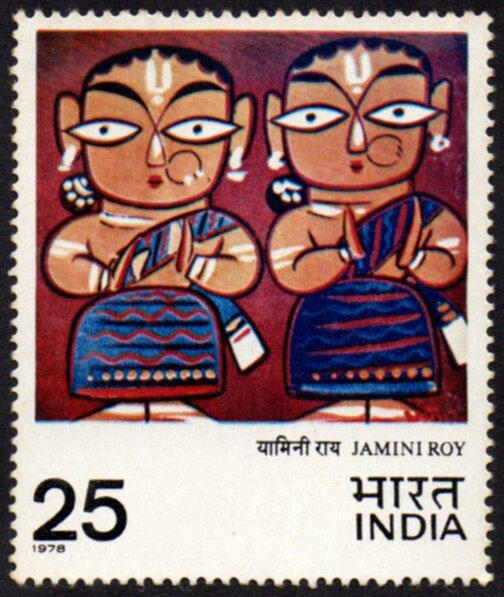
Stamp of India - 1978 Jamini Roy Painting

Jamini Roy died on 24 April 1972. In 1976, the Archaeological Survey of India, Ministry of Culture, Govt. of India declared his works among the "Nine Masters" (National Treasures of India) whose work is to be henceforth considered "to be art treasures, having regard to their artistic and aesthetic value".In 2023, DAG acquired Roy's home, located in Ballygunge, Kolkata, and turn it into a modern museum, Jamini Roy Museum..

On 11 April 2017, Google India dedicated a Google Doodle to celebrate Roy on his 130th birthday.

== Bibliography ==
- Bishnu Dey; John Irwin (1944). Jamini Roy. Indian Society of Oriental Art.
- Six Indian painters: Rabindranath Tagore, Jamini Roy, Amrita Sher-Gil, M.F. Husain, K.G. Subramanyan, Bhupen Khakhar. Tate Gallery Publications Dept. 1982. ISBN 978-0-905005-58-4.
- Jamini Roy in the Context of Indian Folk Sensibility and His Impact on Modern Art: Seminar Papers. Lalit Kala Akademi. 1992.
- Jamini Roy: A Painter Who Revisited the Roots. Niyogi Books. 2022. ISBN 978-93-91125-36-3.
