= Atul Bose =

Indian painter

Atul Basu
- Bose at Windsor Castle ca. 1930
- Born: 22 February 1898; Mymensingh, Bengal Presidency, British India
- Died: 10 July 1977 (aged 79); Calcutta, India
- Education: Government College of Art and Craft, Calcutta; Royal Academy
- Known for: Founding the Indian Academy of Art

Atul Basu (22 February 1898 – 10 July 1977) was an Indian painter. He was an expert in portraying realistic landscapes, portraits and village scenery. He used oil colors for painting.

== Early life and education ==
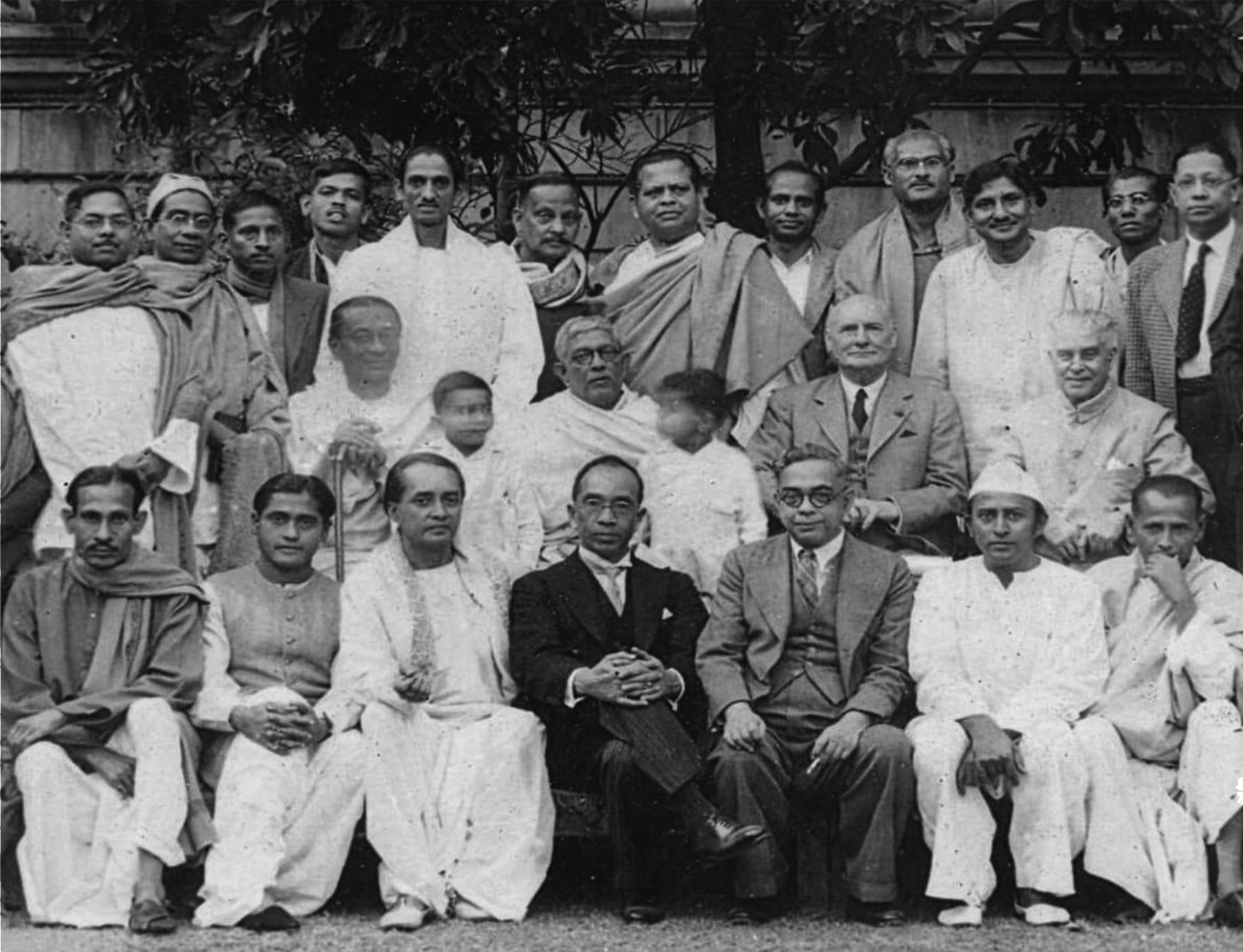
Standing third row, second from right – Gobardhan Ash. Seated middle row from right second Percy Brown and third Jamini Roy]. Front row from right fourth Atul Bose and other artists at the Government College of Art & Craft, 1929

Atul was born in 1898 at Mymensingh in the then Bengal Presidency. He spent his childhood in Mymensingh town. He started his primary education in the National Council of Education, Mymensingh branch. Then he studied in Jubilee Art Academy of Kolkata. The syllabus of this academy was not same as other academies.

A sketch of the educationist Asutosh Mukherjee, 'Bengal Tiger', won Bose a scholarship from the University of Calcutta to study art at the Royal Academy in London from 1924 to 1926. While studying there, Bose was influenced by the post-impressionist Walter Sickert. He refused an invitation to help Mukul Dey decorate the pavilion at the British Empire Exhibition.

== Career ==
Bose helped Hemen Majumdar to establish Indian Academy of Art in 1919. He was the founder member of the academy and he had also been the principal of the Government Art School, Calcutta during 1945–1948. Afterwards he became the director of the Government College of Art & Craft.

Bose painted portraits from the original collections at the Windsor Castle and the Buckingham Palace under the commission of the Indian government. His notable works include Sphinx (oil on plywood) and Self Portrait (1945).

In 1921, Bose along with Bhabani Charan Laha set up Indian School of Oriental Art.

Rabindra Bharati University, Calcutta honored Bose with a D.Litt degree in 1970.

== Collections ==
- Kiran Nadar Museum of Art (KNMA)
- National Gallery of Modern Art
- Indian Museum
- Parliament House, New Delhi
- Raj Bhavan, Kolkata
