= Gouri Bhanja =

Indian artist and art educator (1907–1998)

- Born: Gouri Bose; 1907; Munger, Bihar, India
- Died: 1998 (aged 90–91)
- Education: Kala Bhavana
- Style: Batik
- Relatives: Nandalal Bose (father) Jamuna Sen (sister) Surendranath Kar (uncle)

Gouri Bhanja (1907–1998) was an Indian artist best known for contributing to the original illuminated Constitution of India and for dedicating several decades of her life to teaching at Kala Bhavana. She was the eldest daughter of Nandalal Bose, master of Indian art.

== Personal life ==
Gouri Bhanja was born in 1907 in Munger, Bihar in India to parents Sudhira Devi and Nandalal Bose. Her father, a highly respected artist himself, raised all of his children with deep involvement in the arts. Her younger brother Biswarup Bose and sister Jamuna Sen would also go on to make names for themselves in the Indian art world.

Following the completion of her education in 1926, Gouri married Santosh Bhanja, the son of one of her father's friends. The pair had a daughter in 1928, Bani Patel, who eventually followed family tradition and became an artist. They had at least one more child, a son named Pradyot.

== Education ==
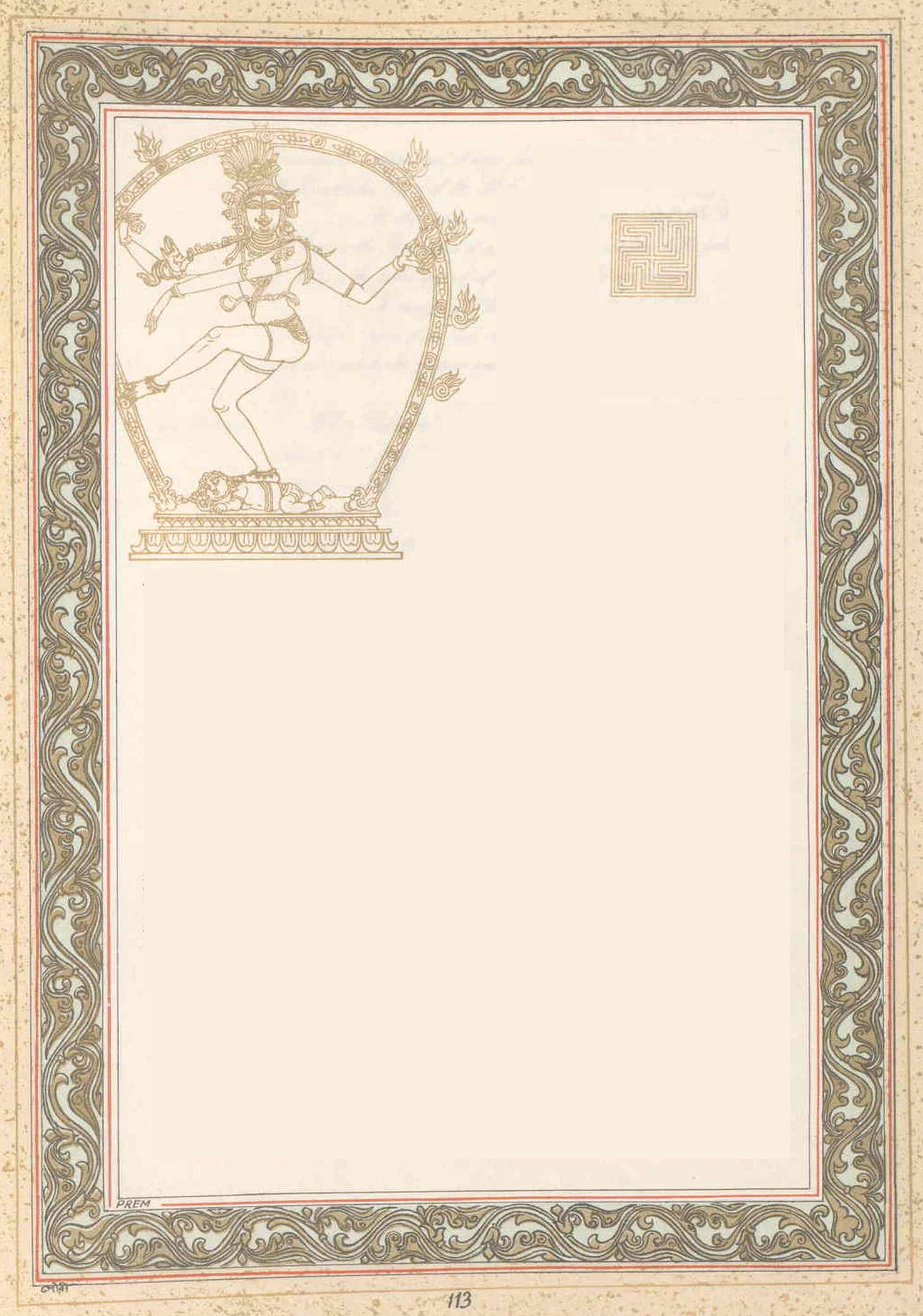
Illustration of Nataraja by Gouri Bhanja, Constitution of India p. 233

Gouri Bhanja became a highly educated woman following the encouragement of her father, Nandalal Bose, who continues to be regarded as a master in Indian painting and printmaking. In 1976, his name was included on a list of the nine most important, master Indian artists published by the Government of India. In 1922, Nandalal became the first principal of the Kala Bhavana fine arts school at Visva-Bharati University in Santiniketan. Under his direction the school began admitting female students soon after, and Gouri and her sister Jamuna Sen were included among the first cohorts admitted following extensive personal recommendations by Rabindranath Tagore.

Gouri received her diploma in painting at only 19, after studying under professors like her father and maternal uncle Surendranath Kar.

== Career ==
Gouri Bhanja is known for reviving batik arts in Shantiniketan and northern India in the 20th century. She is also credited with establishing alpana art in the region, participating in the creation of alpana in Jabalpur and for Congress' Haipura meeting in 1938. At the invitation of her father Nandalal Bose, Gouri, her brother, and her daughter Bani Patel were both invited to contribute artwork to the original Constitution of India alongside artisans like Beohar Rammanohar Sinha and Dinanath Bhargava.

In addition to her work as an artist and educator, Gouri was an accomplished dancer. In 1926, Rabindranath Tagore invited her to be the lead actress in the first production of his original stage dance-drama Natir Puja (The Dancing Girl's Worship). Following the performance, Rabindranath told Gouri's father that "this girl has touched fire, keep her carefully". Bhanja also worked on other aspects of performance, designing and crafting costumes for early stage productions of Chitrangada and Tasher Desh. An elaborate, batik sari designed by Nandalal Bose and crafted by Gouri Bhanja for use in a 1940 Tagore production is concerned a prized item among the vast collections of CSMVS Museum in Mumbai.

=== Academic activities ===
From 1928 until her retirement in 1972, Gouri Bhanja taught at Kala Bhavana in some capacity. She began her career in academics by teaching fine arts and crafts as an "honorary instructor" for several years, before earning her official instructor title from the institution in 1933. Bhanja taught as an assistant lecturer from 1957 until 1967, and spent the last 5 years of her career working as a lecturer until 1972. Gouri began working as head instructor in the craftwork department in 1938 following the sudden death of her mentor and fellow instructor Shukumari Devi. She continued Devi's work teaching alpana techniques to students, working with the school's administration and her students to decorate the school.

Over four and a half decades, she taught courses in Javanese batik, Indian embroidery, leatherwork, macrame, bandhani, and manipuri textiles. In 1952, she led her students in the design and construction of Shantiniketan's Republic Day Parade float.

=== Awards ===
- West Bengal Academy Prize, 1978.
- Honorary Doctorate of Letters, Rabindra Bharati University, 1991.
- Deshikottam (highest accolade awarded by institution), Visva-Bharati University, 1998.
