= Shantiniketan Batik =

- Geographical indication
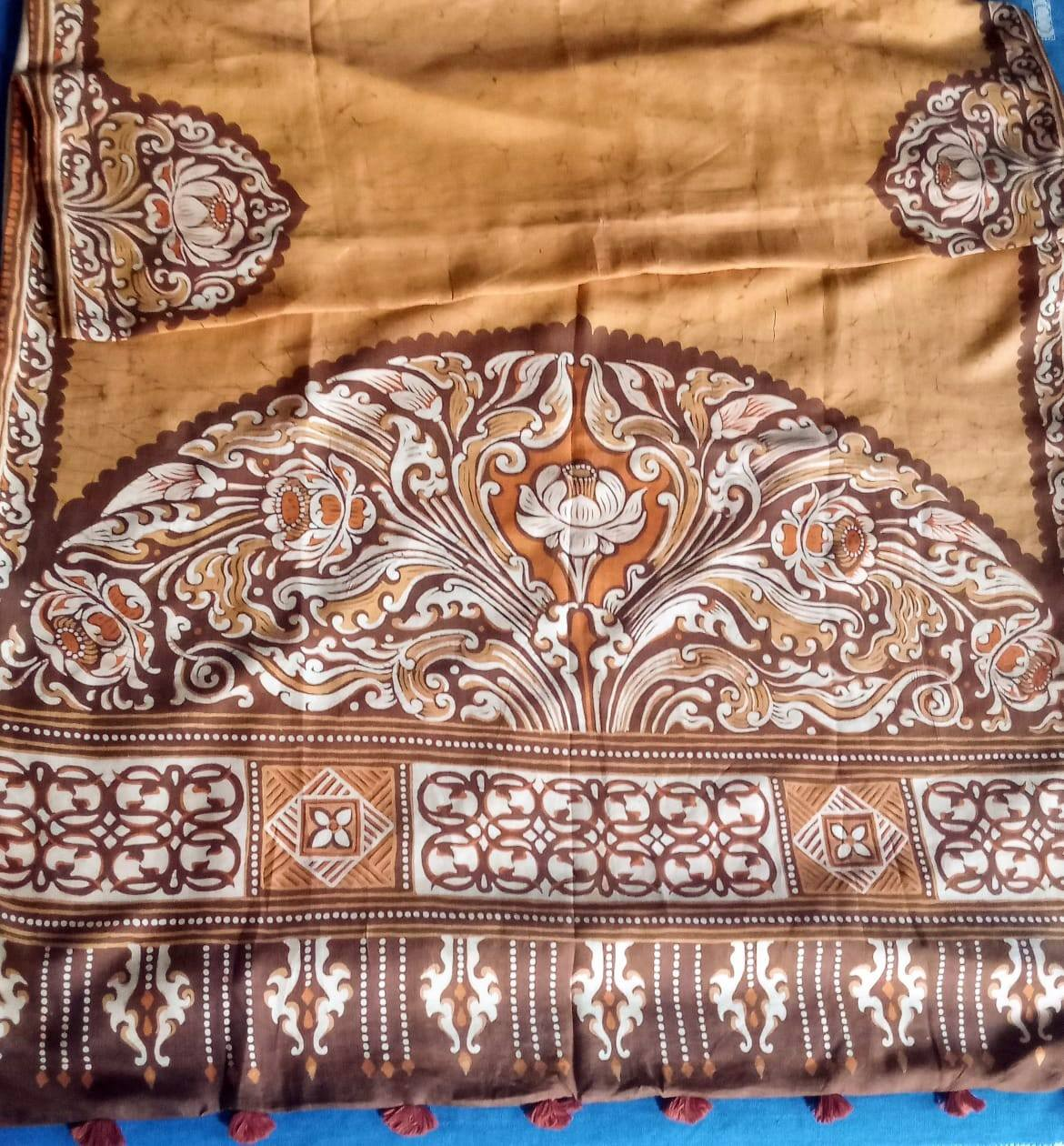
- Alternative names: Shantiniketan Batik Textile
- Description: hand-painted print batik evolved at Santiniketan
- Type: Class 18, 24 & 25–Batik print on Textile and Textile Goods, Fabrics, Clothing Leather and Imitations of Leather.
- Area: Shantiniketan
- Country: India
- Registered: 2026
- Official website: ipindiaservices.gov.in

Shantiniketan Batik evolved at Shantiniketan, in the Indian state of West Bengal, and is renowned for its unique technique, artistic philosophy, and visual identity, which collectively set it apart from other batik traditions. Rabindranath Tagore popularized batik at Santiniketan.

The use of hand-painted prints instead of mechanical prints makes Santiniketan Batik unique. Santiniketan batik is more intricate due to the small tulis or brush used to create the prints. This batik does not use artificial colours, instead colours are made from organic materials such as leaves and bark of various trees, which makes the print unique. The artists use their own designs, and the artisan has freedom in choosing the motifs and designs. The range of designs in Santiniketan batik is diverse, including flowers, foliage, alpana designs, folk art scenes and Hindu and Buddhist deities.

Shantiniketan batik work is done on various types of clothing, leather bags, and jewelry boxes, etc. These batik products are sold in India and abroad, and the main contributors to production are mainly women artisans.

== History ==
There is debate as to where batik originated—Indonesia, India, Japan, or China. According to scholars such as John Guy and Maxwell, the technique of batik in Southeast Asia and many of its designs were inspired by imported Indian textiles. It is generally said that batik originated in Java, Indonesia, and was later brought to India by Rabindranath Tagore in 1927. Nevertheless, due to its design and finesse, and the effort and attention given to it, Santiniketan batik has developed into a glory of its own.

Surendranath Kar accompanied Rabindranath Tagore on his tour of Java and Bali in 1927, where he studied batik work on cloth in depth using various methods and tools. In 1927, Kar and Rathindranath imported some tools and equipment. With the help of Nandalal Bose and the students of Kala Bhavan, they introduced batik handicrafts, which were very simple and more suitable for the rural population.

== Patterns and motifs ==
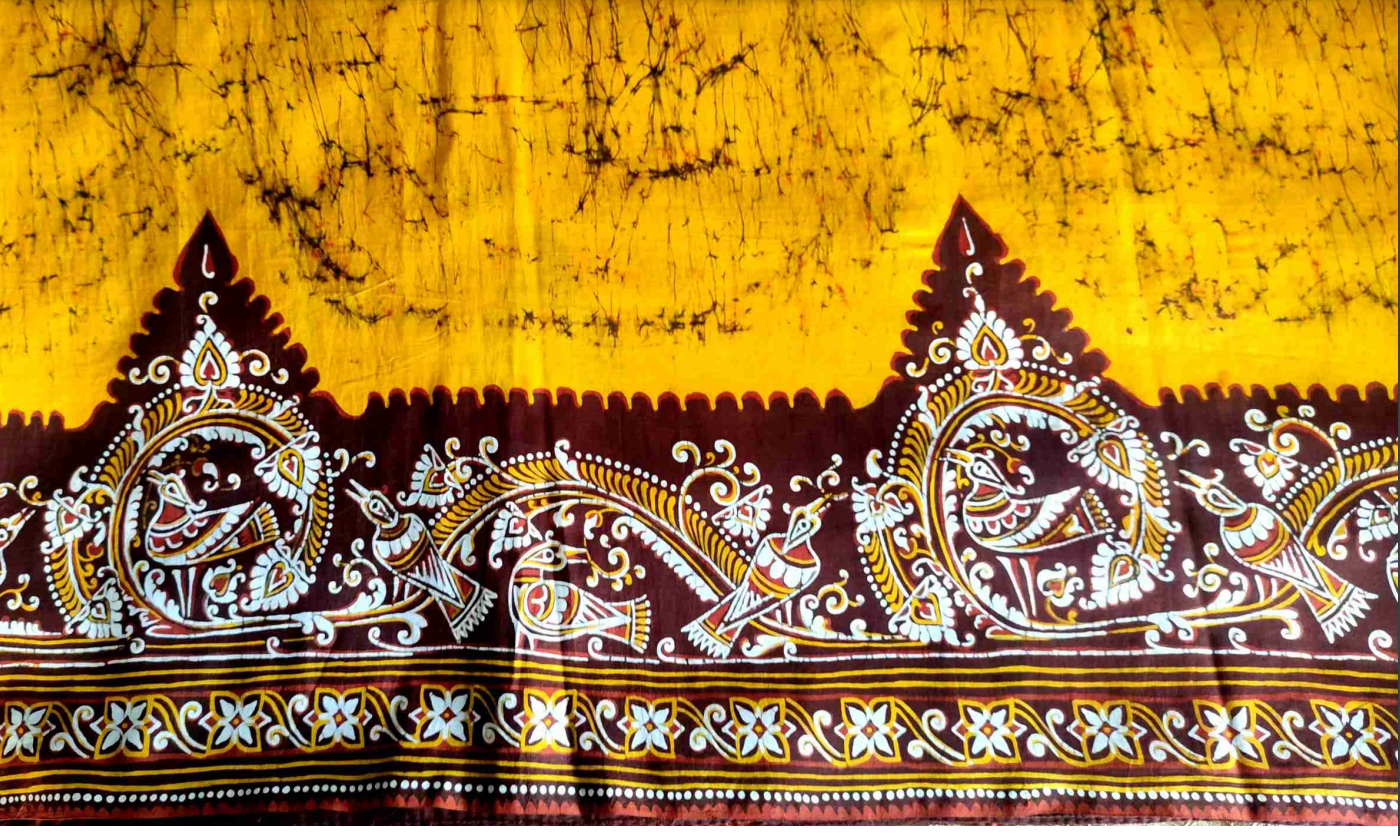
The border of the sari shows a Shantiniketan batik design, which was created by Jamuna Sen.

The design of Shantiniketan batik is based on the makers' own thoughts and culture, reflecting their love for the natural environment around them. Dr. Amiya Ghosh points out that the cultural background of the artisan and the preferences of the customer intrinsically shape the product. The artisan has the freedom to decide on the motifs and patterns, and thus, the mental vocabulary of the maker shapes the design elements of an object. However, the customer plays an important role; and the motifs are selected depending on the market, such as camels for the Rajasthani market, as camels are famous in Rajasthan.

The repertoire of Shantiniketan designs is diverse, including flowers, foliage, alpana designs, objects of worship such as conchs, folklore, and Hindu and Buddhist deities. Batiks feature design motifs such as lotus, lotus, marigold, conch, peacock, fish, and geometric tassels. Some batik designs (even if they are technically laborious and complex) were created to meet market demands and fashion trends.

Batik designs often use two or three colors. Previously, only natural dyes were used; however, nowadays both natural and synthetic dyes are used, depending on the artist's and the customer's preferred color scheme.

== Geographical Indication Status ==
In 2026, Shantiniketan Batik was granted a Geographical Indication (GI) tag under the Geographical Indications (Registration and Protection) Act, 1999.

== Sources ==
- Registrar, Geographical Indications (26 November 2025). "Geographical Indication Journal No-110". Geographical Indication Journal. Chennai: Geographical Indication Registry, Chennai.
