= Devi Prasad =

Devi Prasad may refer to:

- Devi Prasad Shetty (born 1953), Indian philanthropist and a cardiac surgeon
- D. P. Tripathi (1952–2020), Indian politician
- Devi Prasad (artist) (1921–2011), Indian potter and painter
- Devi Sri Prasad (born 1979), Indian music composer (active since 1999)
- G. Deviprasad (born 1958), activist and politician
