= Alpana =

South Asian folk art style

Alpana created for Durga Puja, 2020

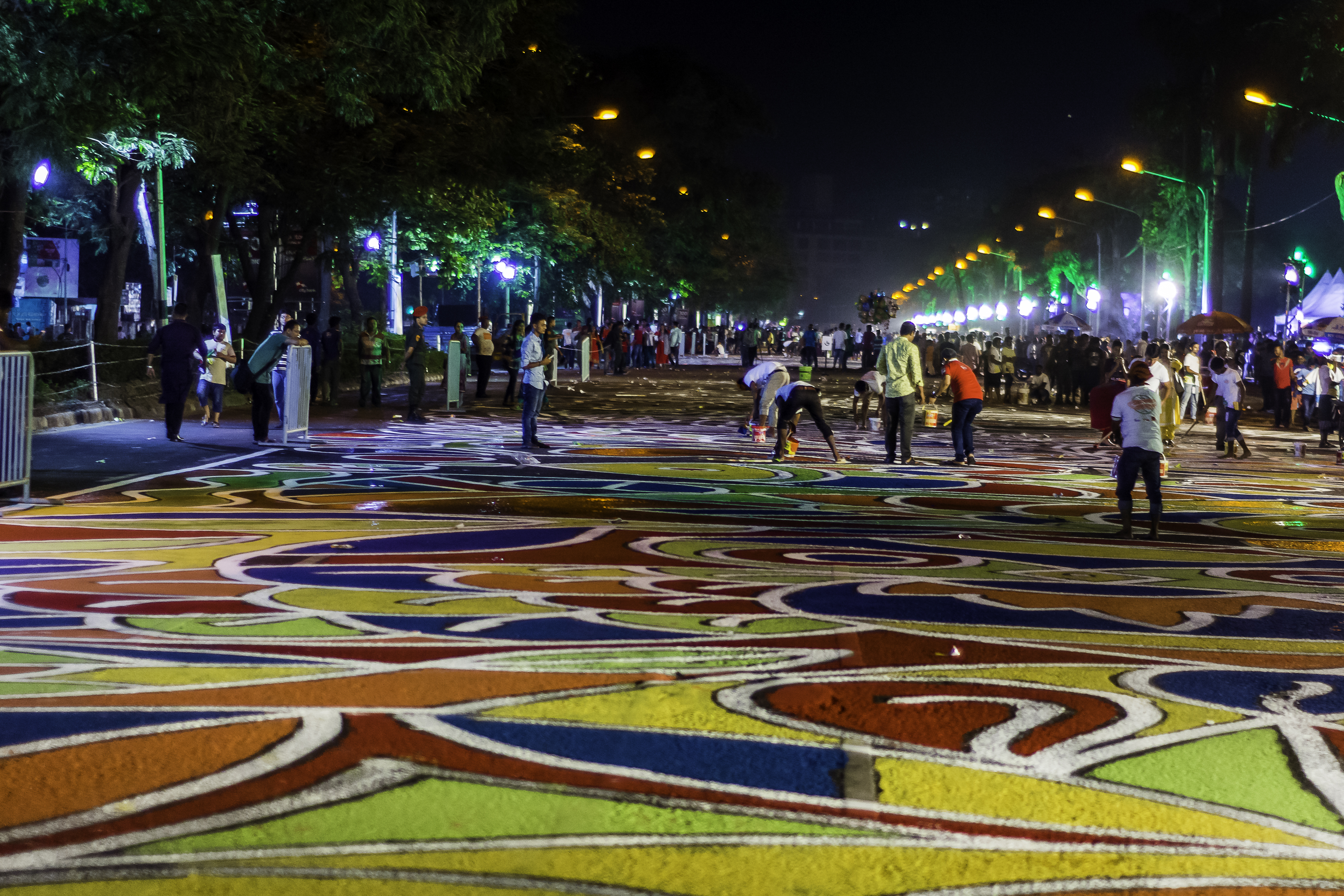
Alpana work in Bangladesh during Language Movement Day, 2017

Alpana or alpona (Bengali: আলপনা) is a Bengali folk art style consisting of colored motifs, patterns, and symbols that are painted on floors and walls with paints made from rice flour, on religious occasions. Alpana is common to Bangladesh and the Indian state of West Bengal. Amongst Hindu families, alpanas may contain religious motifs with symbolic designs that relate to religious austerity, festivals, and specific deities. Amongst Santal tribal communities, alpanas often contain geometric or symbolic patterns drawn from nature. Although traditionally the domain of rural women, alpana motifs have been very influential in modern Indian art, and are incorporated into the works of artists such as Jamini Roy, Abanindranath Tagore, Devi Prasad, and in the early illustrations of film-maker Satyajit Ray. In contemporary Bengal, alpanas are created as part of religious festivals such as Kojagari Lakshmi Puja, Durga Puja, Pohela Boishakh and wedding celebrations in public and private spaces.

== Development and motifs ==
Alpanas were traditionally created by women in the Bengal region, and is a form of ritual art, similar in technique to rangoli, kolam, and chowk poorana in other parts of South Asia, but with distinct motifs and patterns. It is likely to have originated in agrarian societies.

The symbolic patterns used in alpana may be linked to bratas, or religious fasts maintained by women. These fasts may have been to respect specific deities, in return for blessings and were associated with ideas of religious purity. The use of alpanas are closely associated with religious ceremonies: for instance, they may have been used as decoration and part of the ceremony during traditional weddings, naming ceremonies, and festivals. For instance, in parts of West Bengal, alpanas are created to mark the end of a period of fasting, and are accompanied by a special worship ceremony. When performed in honor of the goddess Lakshmi, the alpana will contain symbols and motifs that relate to her, such as her carrier, an owl, as well as a granary, a conch shell and lotus flowers. Linear designs, usually created inside the house on the floor, are intended to symbolise that Lakshmi, the goddess of prosperity, has entered the house, indicating a blessing. The motifs are not always organised into a structured layout and are often free-form, accompanied by floral designs and geometric patterns. Circular alpanas have been created as decorative pedestals for idols, and wall panels of alpanas can illustrate deities as well as scenes from religious tradition. Traditional alpana designs can also be linked to bratas relating to particular seasons or festivals. For instance, during the monsoon, a stylized sheaf of rice may form a part of the alpana to symbolise the sowing of paddy. Some alpanas may be linked to specific cultural concerns, such as warding off disease by the use of specific symbols. Among the Santal tribal communities, alpanas may contain geometric and symbolic patterns drawn from nature.

Alpanas form a significant part of the celebrations of Durga Puja in Bengal. The word alpana derives from the Sanskrit term alimpana, which means 'plastering' or 'coating'.

== Techniques and materials ==
An alpana is usually created on flooring, generally directly on the ground. On this, a wet white pigment made of rice flour and water (or in some places, chalk powder and water) is used to outline the alpana, with the paint being applied by the artist's finger tips, a small twig, or a piece of cotton thread that is soaked in the dye, or fabric. Colors are sometimes added, traditionally using naturally-derived ingredients that are mixed with the white paint. When dried, the pigment appears white against the darker background of the cow-dung floor.

The motifs and designs in alpanas are usually created in a free-hand style, without the use of stencils or patterns. In the region of Bengal, it is common to use floral motifs, as well as figurative symbols representing specific gods. Modern alpanas may use materials including glue, vermilion, and dyes for more durable designs.

== Conservation, modern art, and popular culture ==
Contemporary alpanas are not as common, and in a bid to revive the art form, several non-profit organisations such as the Indian National Trust for Art and Cultural Heritage (a non-profit art conservation body) and the Daricha Foundation have initiated efforts to train artists, through lectures and demonstrations. Modern efforts at reviving the art form include public events in which alpanas stretching over several streets are created by volunteers, as well as alpana competitions, often held during the Durga pujas, a religious festival. In the 1980s, alpanar bois, or thin booklets of alpana designs, could be purchased and used to teach and replicate traditional motifs. In some parts of West Bengal, the use of alpanas containing the symbols of political parties as part of election campaigns has also occurred. The creation of alpanas has been taught as an art form at Kala Bhavana, the fine arts department of Visva Bharati University, by notable artists including Sukumari Devi, Kiranbala Devi and Jamuna Sen. In 2016, it was made a part of the foundation course for undergraduates at Kala Bhavan, and students are now trained in some of the most common traditional motifs and designs.

The Indian modern artist, Nandalal Bose, frequently drew from alpanas and their traditional motifs in his art, especially floral motifs such as the autumn flower. Abanindranath Tagore, the painter and writer, wrote a study of alpanas in his book, Banglar Broto, and compared their motifs to hieroglyphs. The film-maker, Satyajit Ray, who began his career in advertising and graphic design, used motifs from alpanas in advertisements, illustrates, and on book jackets. The artist Rabi Biswas has worked to preserve and record traditional alpanas taught to him by female family members, and now teaches alpana art in West Bengal. Modern artist Jamini Roy also drew heavily from alpanas in his work. The painter, potter, and photographer Devi Prasad also incorporated alpana motifs into his work, as decorative elements in his pottery.

In Bangladesh, alpanas are drawn to celebrate national festivals, such as Language Day (Bhasha Dibash).

== See also ==
- Rangoli
- Jhoti chita
- Kolam
- Kuberakolam
- Kalampattu
- Chowk poorana
- Sand mandala
- Street painting
