= Sahaj Path (book) =

Book by Rabindranath Tagore

Sahaj path
- Author: Rabindranath Tagore
- Original title: সহজ পাঠ
- Illustrator: Nandalal Bose
- Language: Bengali

Sahaj Path (Bengali: সহজ পাঠ) is a well-known Bengali primer, written by Rabindranath Tagore. In two of its editions, this book describes the basics of Bengali language and literature. The first edition (প্রথম ভাগ) has the preliminary ideas of Bengali alphabet, simple words and their structures, pronunciation; while the second edition (দ্বিতীয় ভাগ) includes usage of words in a sentences, paragraphs, short stories and teaches structure of rhymes to improve comprehension.

These books, illustrated in linocuts by famous Indian artist Nandalal Bose, are foundational textbooks designed to teach Bengali language and literature to young learners. It was used as a classic educational text in primary schools for decades.
