= Dinanath Bhargava =

Emblem of India

Dinanath Bhargava (1 November 1927 – 24 December 2016) was an Indian painter of international fame. He was one of the students of Shantiniketan art guru Nandalal Bose. The wash paintings he made are unique in the world of painting.

== Life ==
Bhargava was born in Multai, British India. He was involved in the team of artists and is believed to have sketched the sign (lions) copied from the Ashoka Pillar for the Constitution of India. He copied the national emblem from Sarnath and inserted its motto extracted from Mundaka Upanishad, Satyameva Jayate (Truth alone triumphs). He was just a first year student who joined Kala Bhavana in academic year 1949-50 batch whereas Nandalal Bose retired in 1950–51 at the age of 68 years.

== Death ==
He died on 24 December 2016 (aged 89) from a heart attack.
