= Dinkar Kowshik =

Indian painter (1918–2011)

- Born: 1918; Dharwad
- Died: 13 February 2011; Santiniketan
- Known for: Painter
- Spouse: Pushpa

Dinkar Kowshik (1918-2011) was an influential Indian painter and educator. As principal of Kala Bhavana at Santiniketan, he reshaped it for contemporary art practices.

== Biography ==
Born in Dharawad, Karnataka, in 1918, he was involved in the Quit India Movement during his student days and had been arrested several times. He was a student of Kala Bhavana between 1940 and 1946. His career began at Delhi Polytechnic and later became the principal of Lucknow College of Arts and Crafts. Thereafter, he returned to Kala Bhavana first as a professor and later as its principal. He retired in 1978 and settled down in Santiniketan.

At Santiniketan, the ideas of Rabindranath Tagore on art and teaching continued for a long time as a monumental model. Subsequently, there developed in the art arena of Santikietan the three pillars of ideas – Nandalal Bose, Benode Behari Mukherjee and Ramkinkar Baij. They together raised Santiniketan to a level of unique eminence in the field of modern art in pre-independence India. In the post-independence period, the revivalist idiom of the Bengal School of Art was discarded and a new momentum was visible in the works of many artists. Dinkar Kowshik was a prominent name in the star-studded group. Protest is the very core of the modern vision in contemporary art. Amongst the other prominent names associated with the art arena at Santiniketan in the post-independence era are K.G. Subramanyan and Somnath Hore.

As principal of Kala Bhavana, Dinkar Kowshik reshaped it for contemporary art practices. He invited sculptor Sarbari Roy Choudhury, Ajit Chakraborty, graphic artist Somnath Hore and painters Sanat Kar and Lalu Prasad Shaw to join Kala Bhavana as teachers. Amongst the many things he did to revolutionise the institution was to hold Nandan Mela.Nandan Mela celebrates the birth anniversary of Nandalal Bose. "The students involve in various kinds of activities including art stalls put up by the Painting, Sculpture, Ceramics, Graphics, Design and Art History Departments. These stalls have artworks made by the students and teachers ranging from calendars to craft items, diaries, stationery, fashion jewellery, paintings, prints, saras (clay plates), and ceramics, wood and metal sculptures for sale at affordable prices."

Dinkar Kowshik died in Santiniketan on 13 February 2011, leaving behind his wife, Pushpa, two sons, and a daughter.
