= Jamuna Sen =

Indian artist from Santiniketan

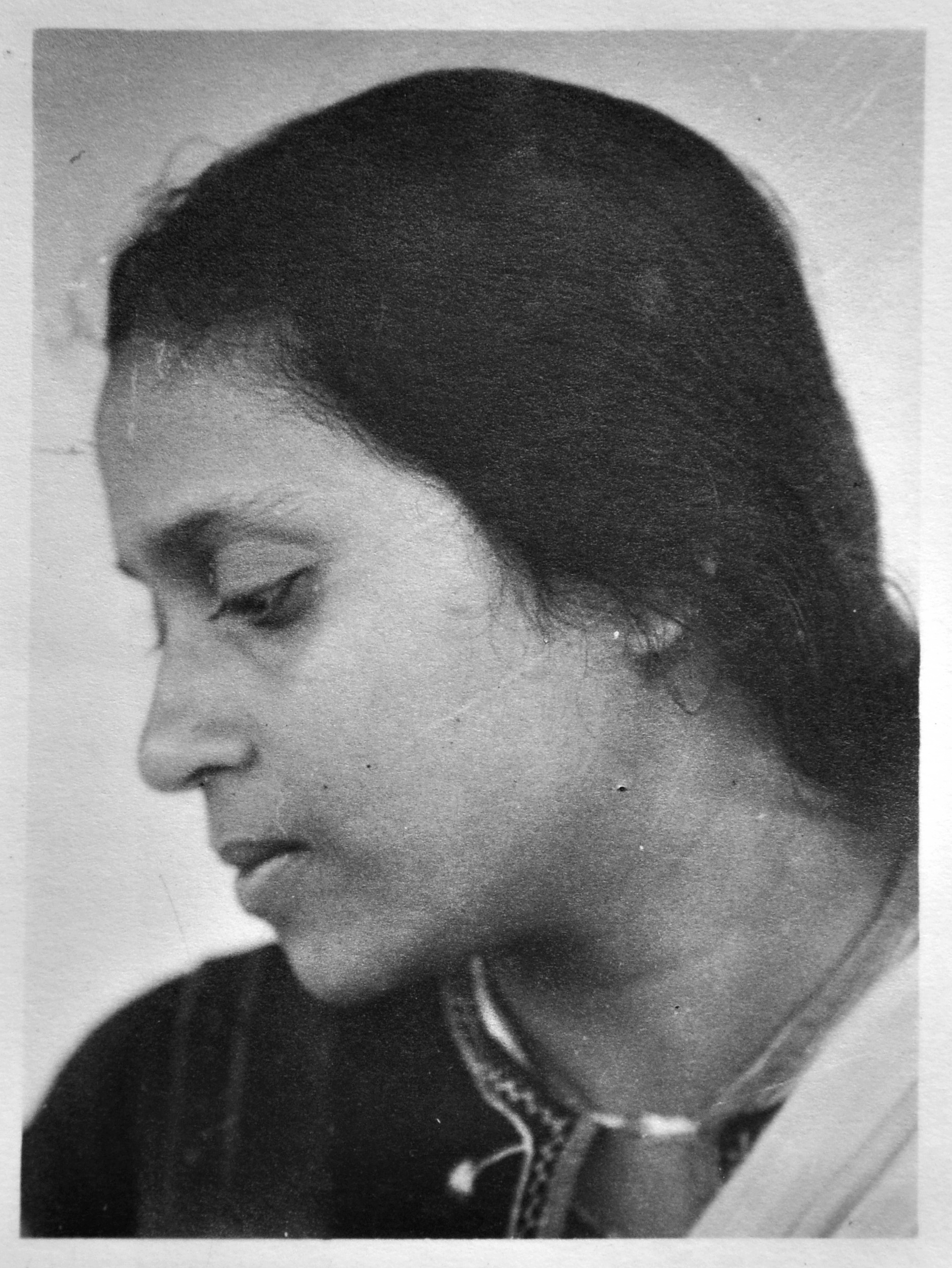
- Born: 7 October 1912; Haveli Kharagpur, Bengal Presidency, British India (now in Bihar, India)
- Died: 10 February 2001 (aged 88); Santiniketan, West Bengal, India
- Education: Kala Bhavana
- Known for: Design, particularly Batik
- Spouse: Keshab Chandra Sen
- Father: Nandalal Bose

Jamuna Sen (née Bose) (Bengali: যমুনা সেন) (7 October 1912 – 10 February 2001) was an Indian artist, known for her design work in a variety of mediums including Batik and Alpona as well as developing, in an Indian context, a variety of traditional crafts from across the world. She was a pioneer in establishing the practice of Batik (wax resist dying) in India in modern times. Daughter of Nandalal Bose, a central figure in modern Indian art, she was brought up in the artistic and intellectual milieu of Santiniketan and made significant contributions in the field of design.

== Early life ==
Jamuna Sen was born in Haveli Kharagpur in Munger District of Bihar in 1912, the third child of Nandalal Bose and Sudhira Devi. Her father Nandalal Bose was a key figure in developing a modernist art movement in India. Indeed, she grew up in a family of artists: her elder siblings Gouri Bhanja (née Bose) and Biswarup Bose were both artists. The former developed and perfected the Alpona art form of Santiniketan. She also had a younger brother, Gorachand Bose, who was an engineer by profession.

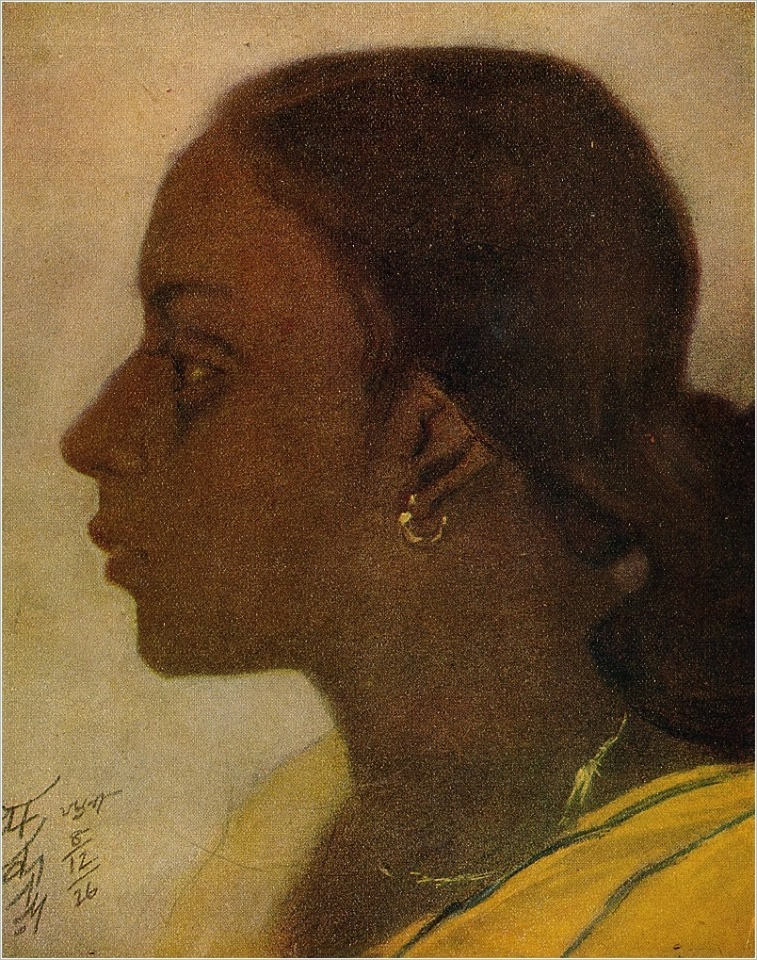
Portrait of Jamuna Bose (later Sen) at age 14 by Abanindranath Tagore, 1926

At the invitation of Rabindranath Tagore, Nandalal Bose took charge as the principal of the nascent art school Kala Bhavana in 1921. Under his tutelage, and with the guidance of Rabindranath, Kala Bhavana would soon go on to become one of the most important art institutions in the world, and more broadly, Santiniketan would develop an aesthetic style in its everyday activities that became part of a wider cultural norm. This is the environment in which Jamuna grew up.

== Family ==
Jamuna married Keshab Chandra Sen (known as Sebak Sen), brother-in-law of Kshitimohan Sen, in 1936. Keshab Chandra Sen was an electrical engineer by profession. Their son Suprabudhha Sen was born in 1938.

== Dance ==
Jamuna Sen was an accomplished dancer from a young age. She wished to learn classical dance formally, but social conventions of the time contravened. However, Tagore spotted her talent and encouraged her to dance to his music, often giving her advise on composition and articulation. It is in this field of the expressive dance style that evolved in Santiniketan that Jamuna excelled. Diyali Lahiri provides a wonderful account:

“She was one of the fortunate students who received care and attention from the poet himself. Those who saw her dancing in some of those roles often said that she was a natural performer and dancing was her second nature. She was a prominent member of the first dance group and the prima ballerina in all Rabindranath's dance dramas. …She, along with other girls, appeared in public on Calcutta stages and elsewhere for many performances under Tagore's guidance.

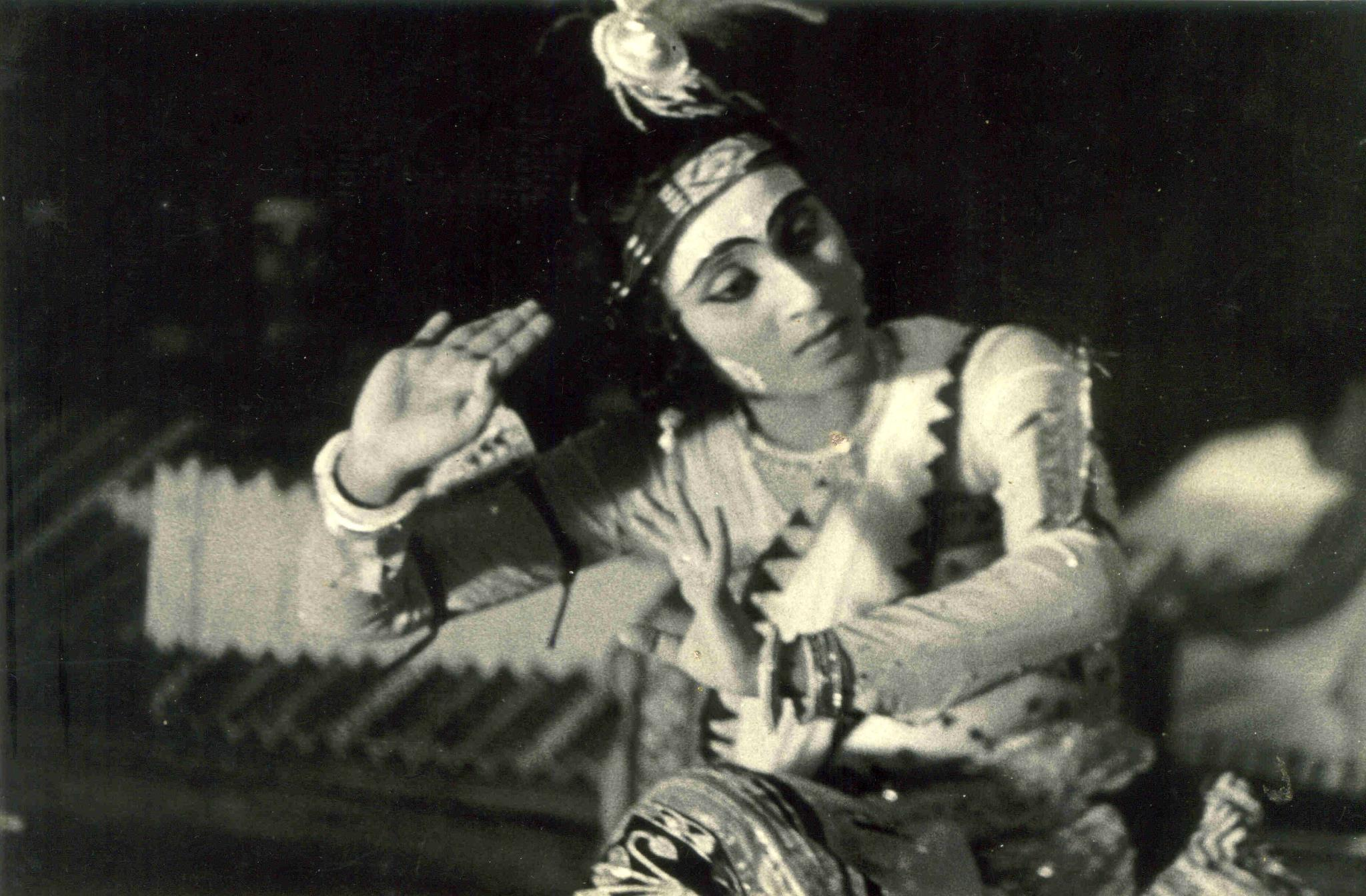
Jamuna Bose (later Sen) in the eponymous role in Tagore's dance drama Chitrangada

They accompanied Tagore on many of his fund-raising trips to perform all over India and Ceylon. This had a major effect in breaking the age-old social taboo of conservative Bengal that prohibited girls from performing on public stage… Jamuna in particular was the trailblazer among them and she continued to dance even after her marriage…These were very bold portrayals of women on stage in the early 1930s. To depict such self-assurance in Chitrangada, such straightforward and passionate probing in Prakriti in Chandalika and the conflict between physical attraction and spiritual love in Kamalika in Shapmochan, and to do so on the public stage, certainly took not only skill and ability but also courage. To express this revolutionary reconstruction of the feminine persona Jamuna was the perfect instrument. Her graceful dancing style, spontaneous expressive movement, and total involvement with the role she depicted, are her legacy. In recognition of her contribution to the "Tagore Dance Style", the West Bengal State Academy presented her with an award for the year 1997-98.”

== Jiu Jitsu ==
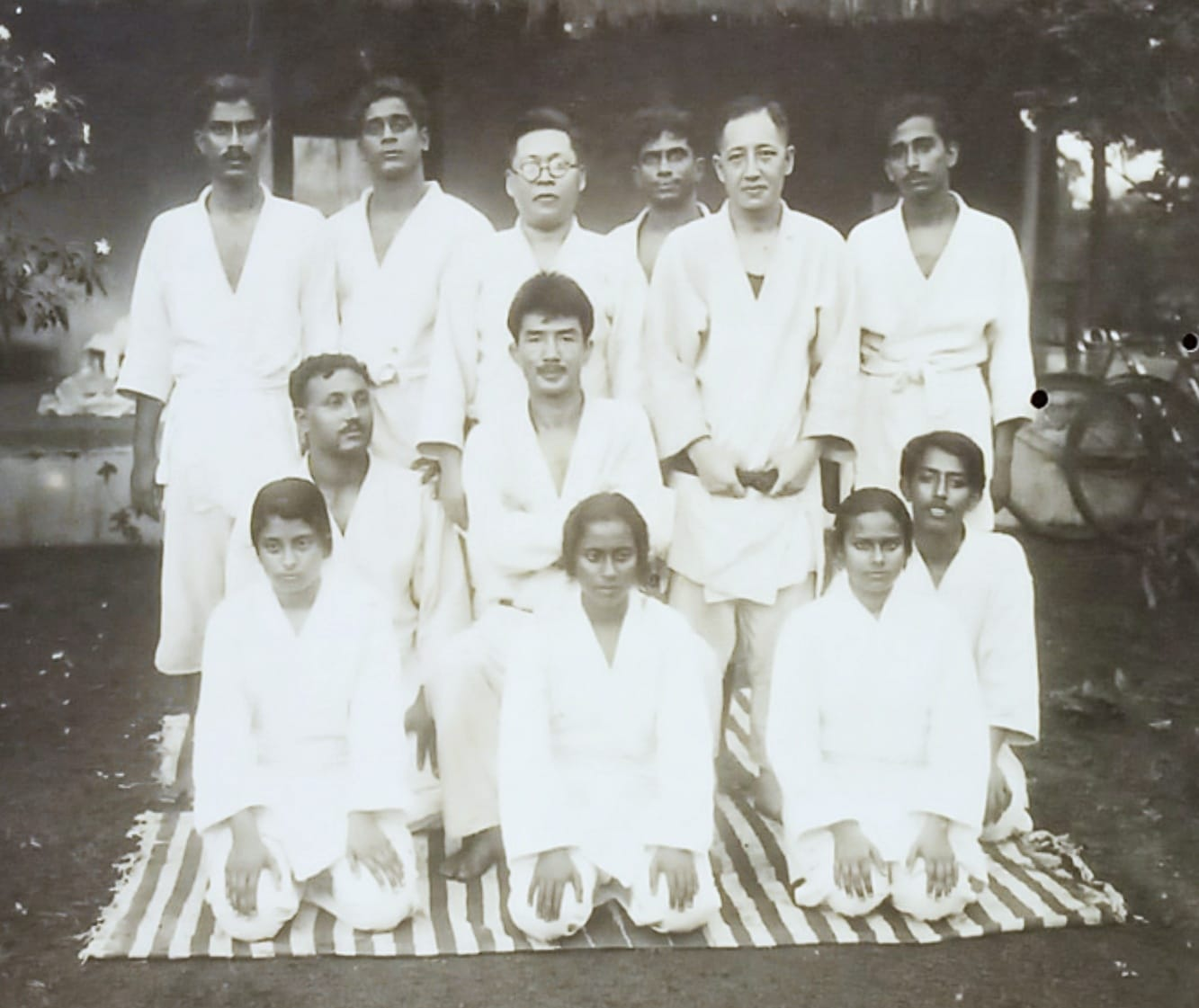
Jiu Jitsu first batch: Jamuna Bose - centre front row

In 1929 Tagore invited Jiu Jitsu teacher Shinzo Takagaki from Japan to visit Santiniketan. With a teacher free from social restrictions, Tagore encouraged both men and women to learn the ancient martial art, and Jamuna, along with her compatriots Amita Sen, Nivedita Bose (née Ghosh), was one of the students. Bearing testament to the progressive ideas of Tagore and Santiniketan, they even performed Jiu Jitsu at New Empire in Kolkata.

== Artistic career ==
=== Kala Bhavana ===
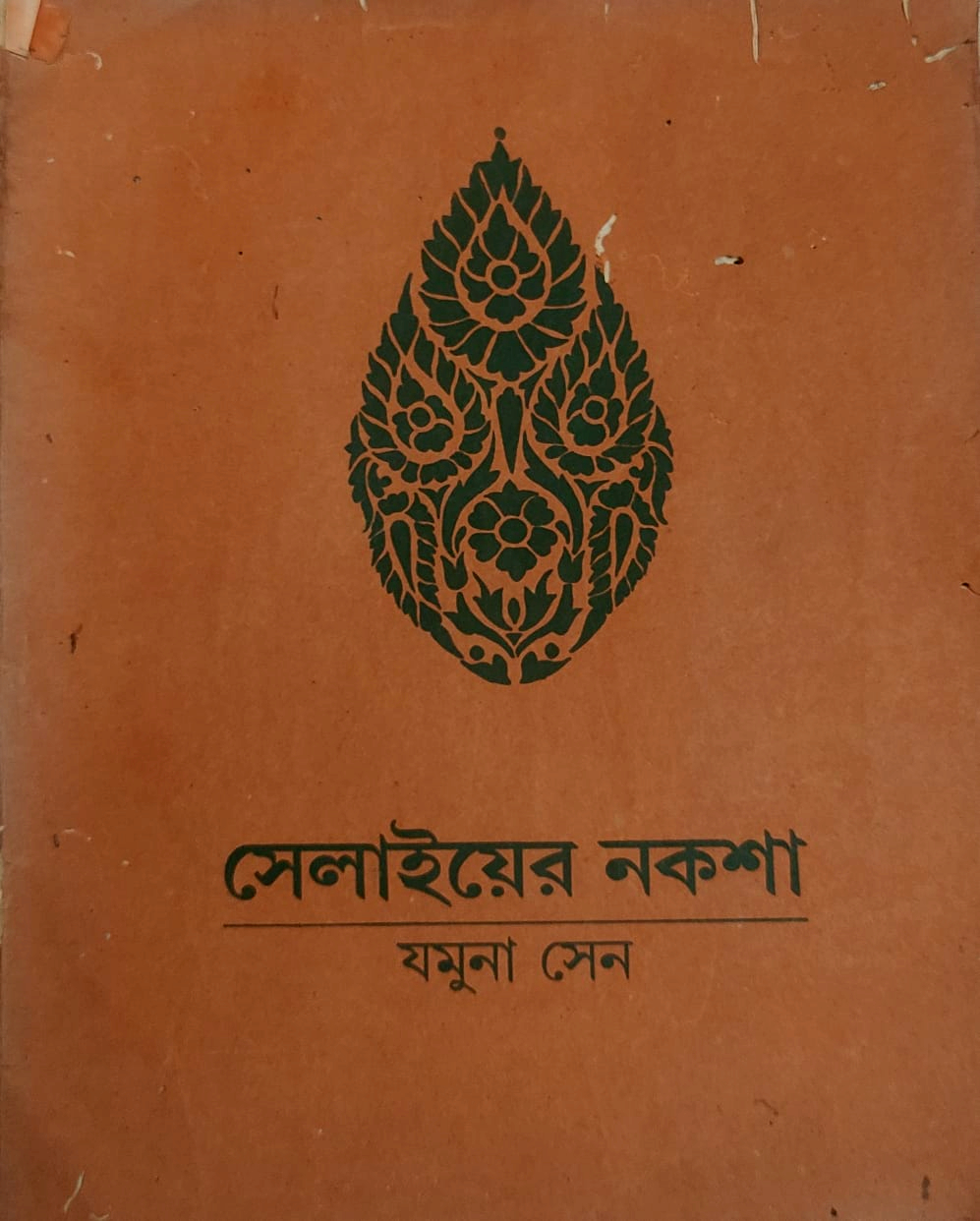
Cover of book on embroidery design by Jamuna Sen

Jamuna joined Kala Bhavana as a student in 1931. At the time, instruction was not formalised, nor was there any fixed graduation date. After her studies ended in 1936, Jamuna remained associated with Kala Bhavana as a teacher, joining formally as faculty in 1943. Her diploma provides an insight into the scope of her work, certifying attainments in painting including mural painting, decorative and ornamental work, Batik, needle-work, weaving in Manipuri handloom as well as stage and festival decoration.

In 1951, Kala Bhavana instituted a two-year certificate course in design. Jamuna Sen was given the responsibility of directing this course with Nanigopal Ghosh. This covered a variety of subjects including Batik, tie-dye, embroidery, leather works, Alpona, weaving etc. This would later lead to the creation of an organisation to enable women graduates of this course to use their skills for economic benefit. This was called Karusangha, after an older short-lived organisation created by Nandalal Bose. She remained in her post in Kala Bhavana until retirement in 1975. In 1951 Jamuna Sen published a book of embroidery designs. This was re-published in an augmented version by Ananda Publishers in 1984. In his introduction to the book, Nandalal Bose writes that the success of the designs is achieved through the artist's unique perception in filtering nature.

Alpona, Crafts and Design works by Jamuna Sen
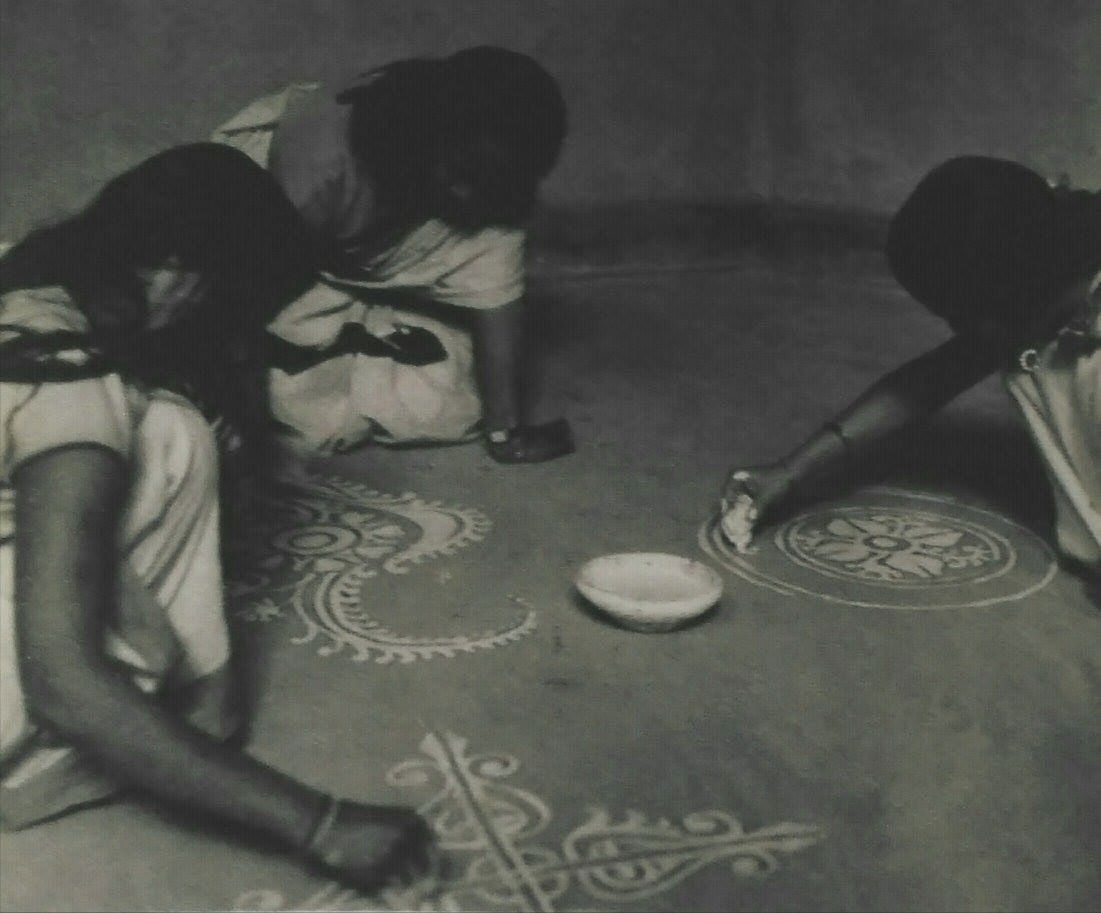
From left: Amala Sarker, Gouri Bhanja, Jamuna Sen

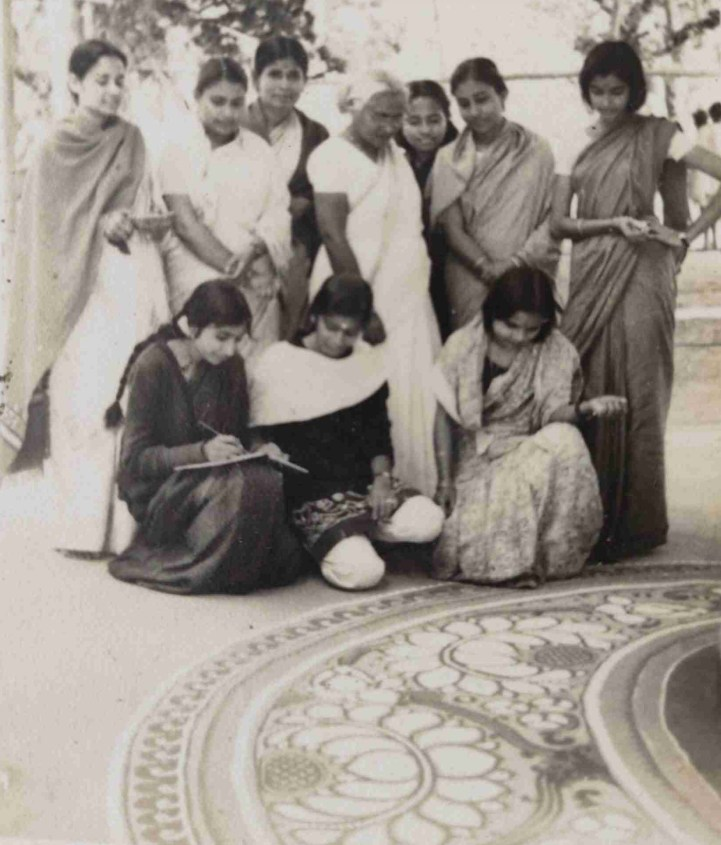
Jamuna Sen with students of Kala Bhavana

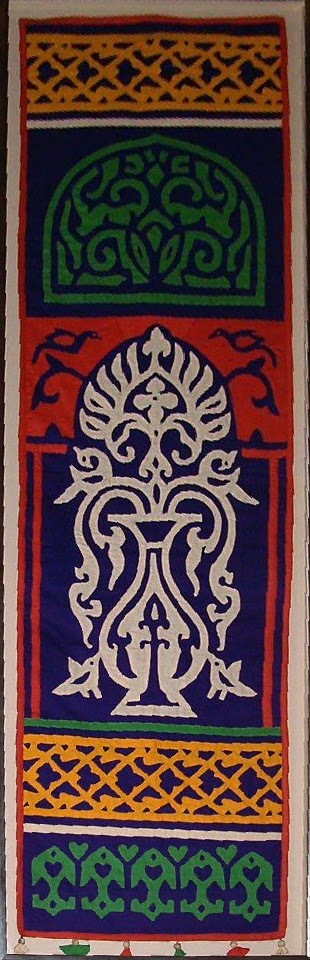
Appliqué by Jamuna Sen

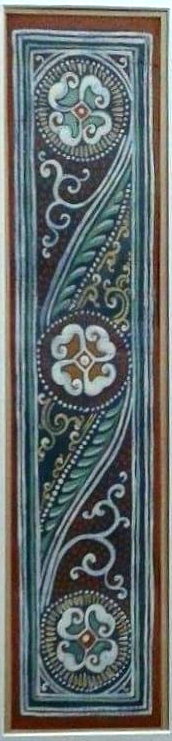
Design work by Jamuna Sen

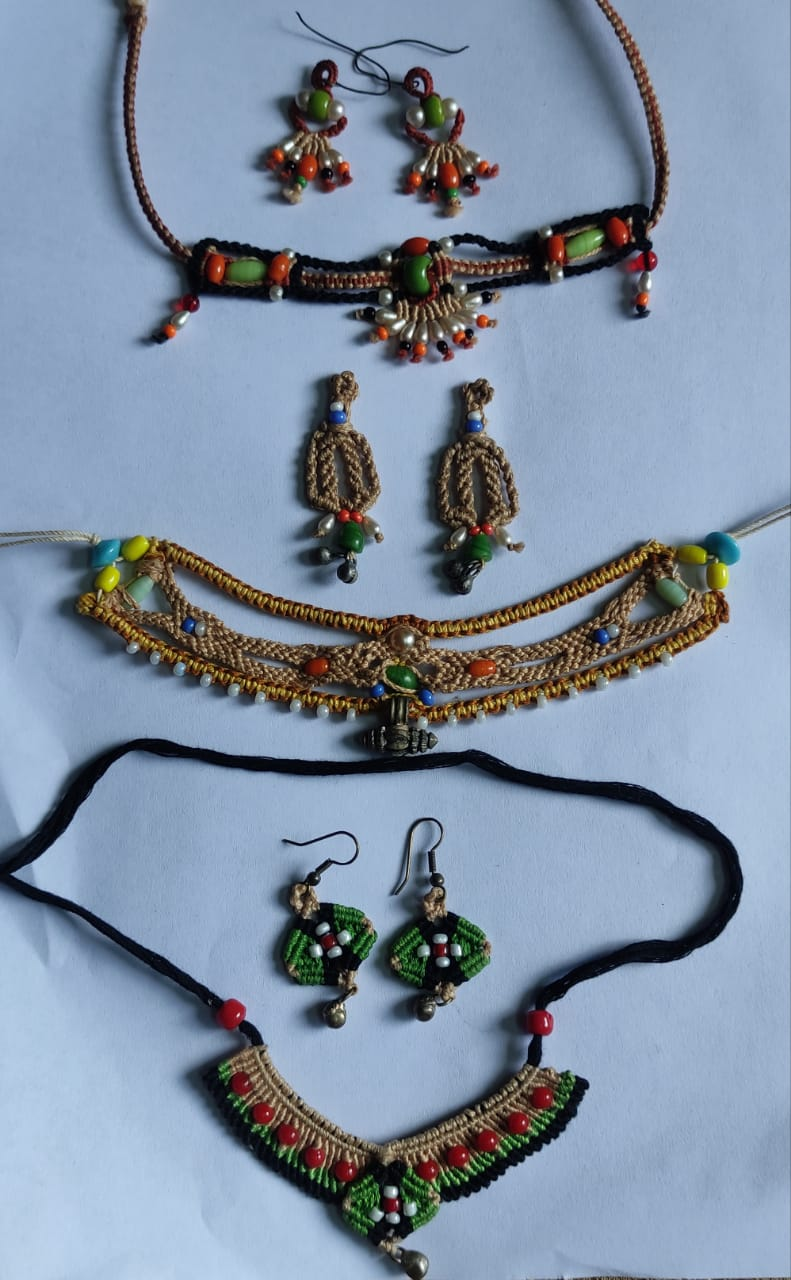
Macramé ornaments by Jamuna Sen
Alpona, crafts, design works

=== Batik ===
Pratima Devi, Rabindranath Tagore's daughter-in-law, had learnt the techniques of Batik in Paris from a French artist and in 1923, brought this knowledge as well as some Batik instruments to Santiniketan. With the help of the French artist Andrée Karpèles, she started a small workshop to explore this technique further. Later Silpa Bhavana (precursor of the current Silpa Sadana) would develop this practice on a larger scale. It is in this venture that Jamuna, along with her sister Gouri, would come to play a key role. Through the instruction of Nandalal and other Kala Bhavana faculty such as Benode Behari Mukherjee, Ramkinkar Baij and Sukumari Devi, Jamuna had developed her own style of design distinct from others around her. Rather than a certain fluid structure of Alpona design developed by her sister Gouri, Jamuna's design style relied on repeating intricate motifs, often juxtaposing several elements to create a complex structure. Photographs of her Alponas and her surviving Batik works bear testament to her artistic vision and supreme skill in executing painstaking tasks. The efforts of Jamuna Sen and Gouri Bhanja in Santiniketan established Batik as an important art form in India in the modern times and from there the practice spread to all corners of India. Indeed, just as initially Indonesian Batik motifs and techniques had influenced the practitioners in Santiniketan, techniques and design ideas developed in Santiniketan would later spread outwards.

Jamuna Sen's Batik work
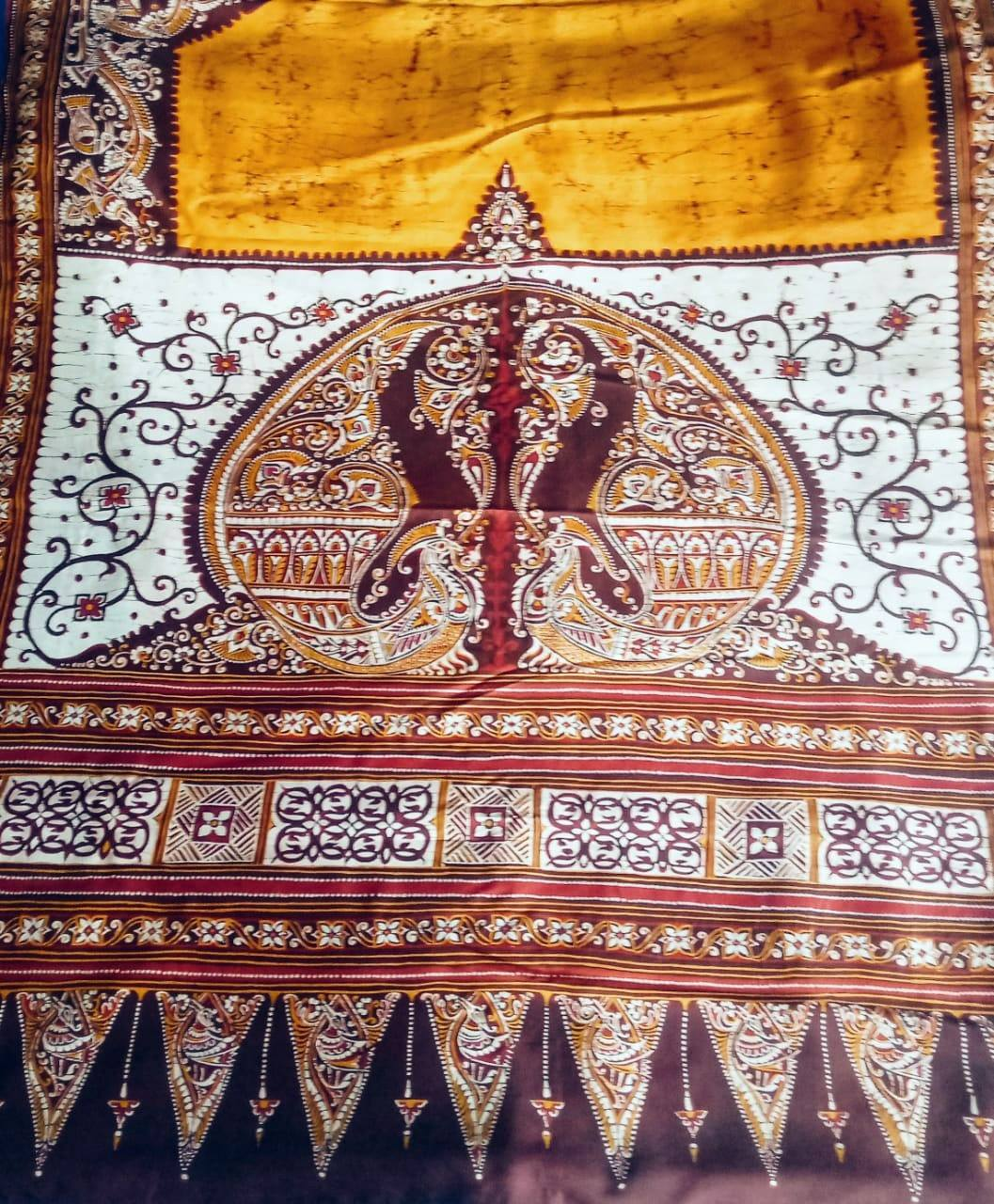
Batik Sari by Jamuna Sen

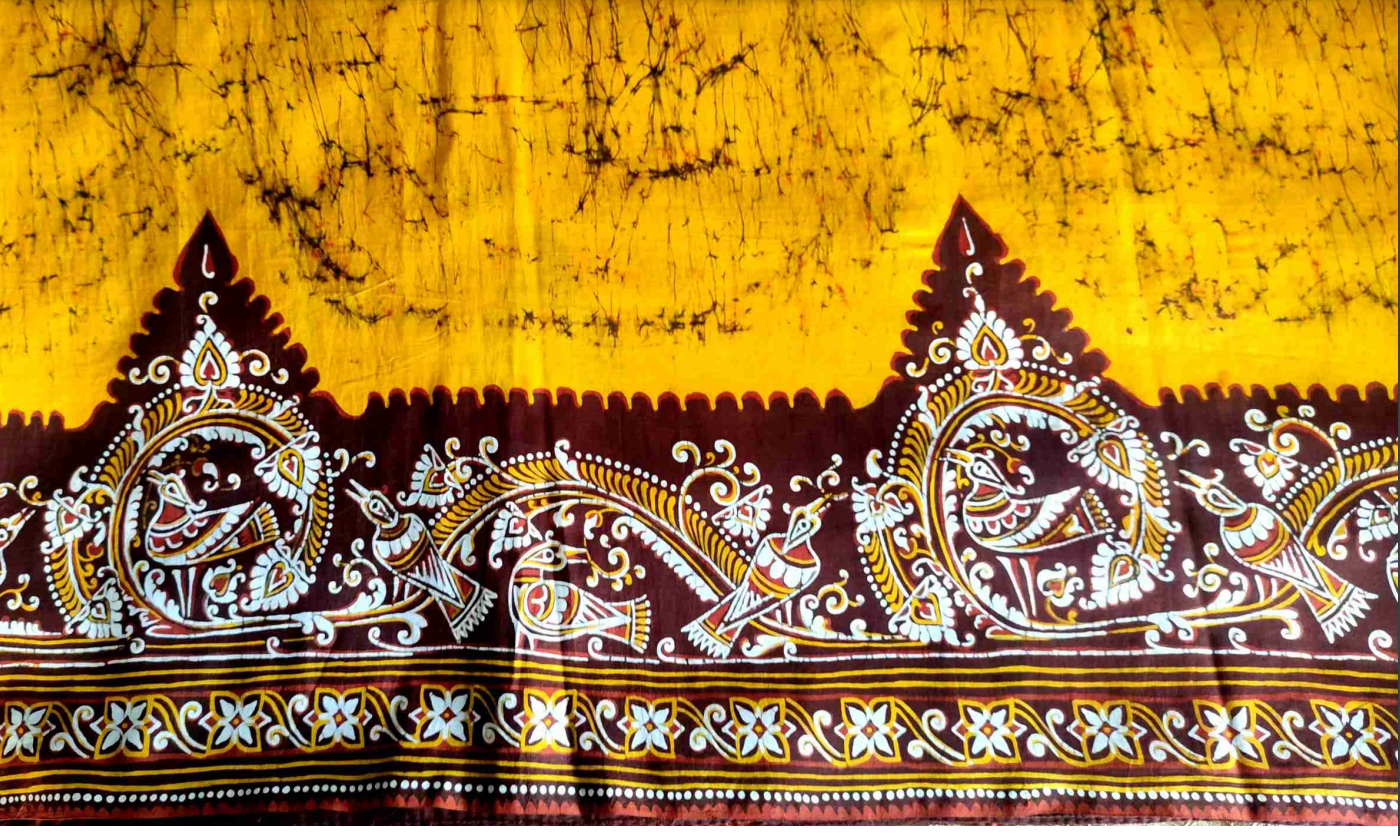
Border of the Batik Sari in the photo on the left, by Jamuna Sen

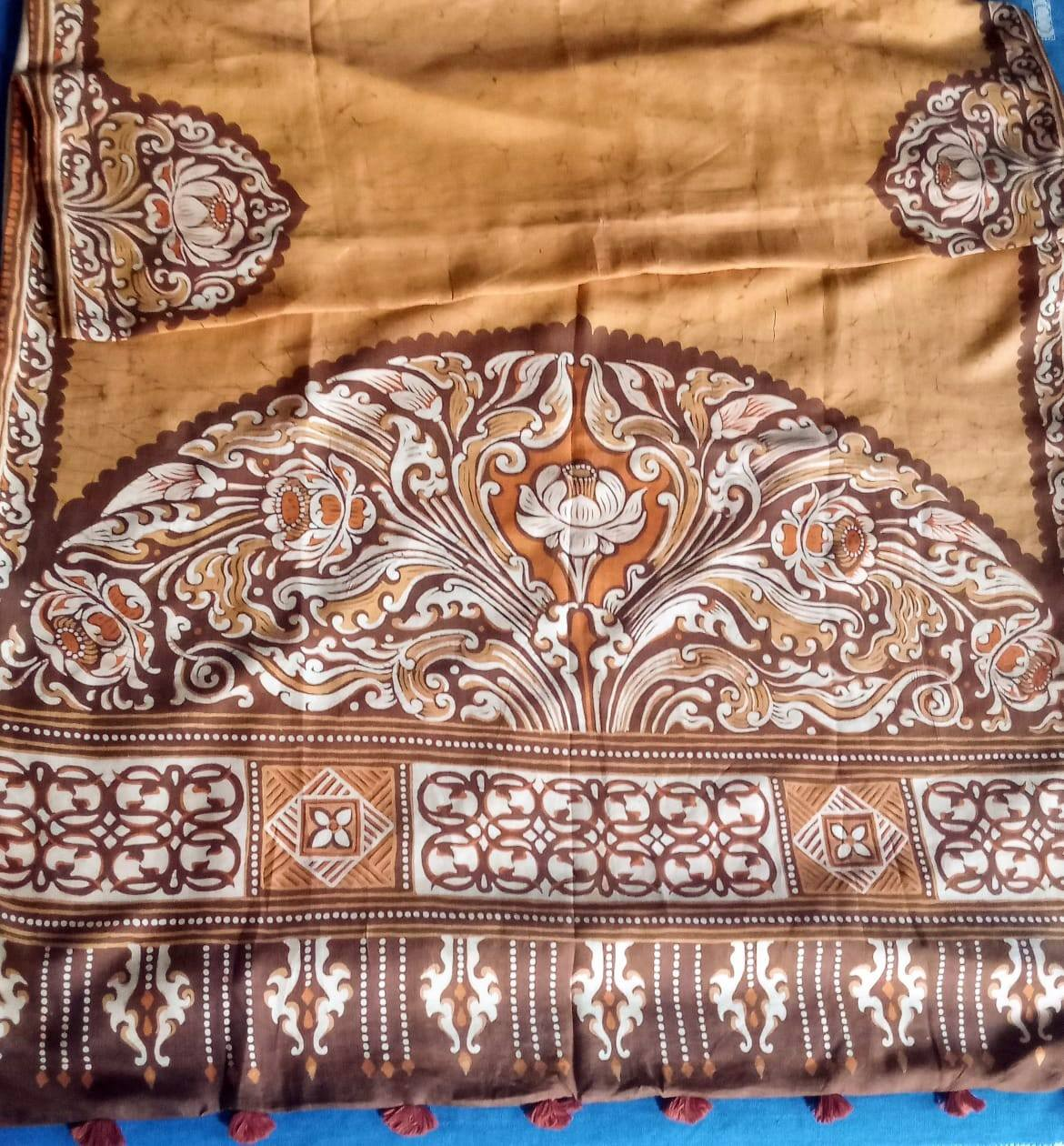
Batik stole by Jamuna Sen
Batik works
Some other works by Jamuna Sen
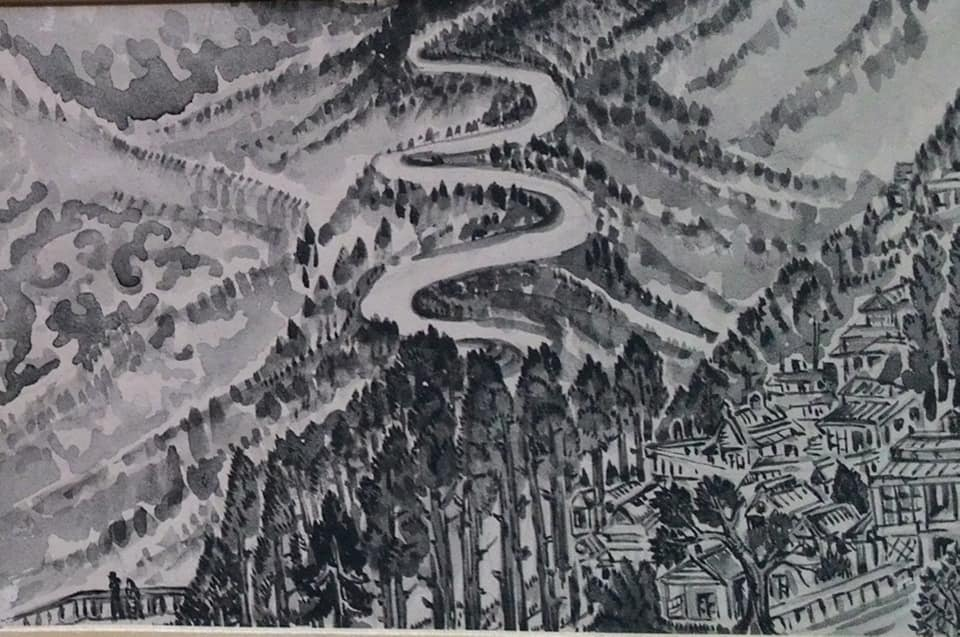
Pen and ink wash by Jamuna Sen

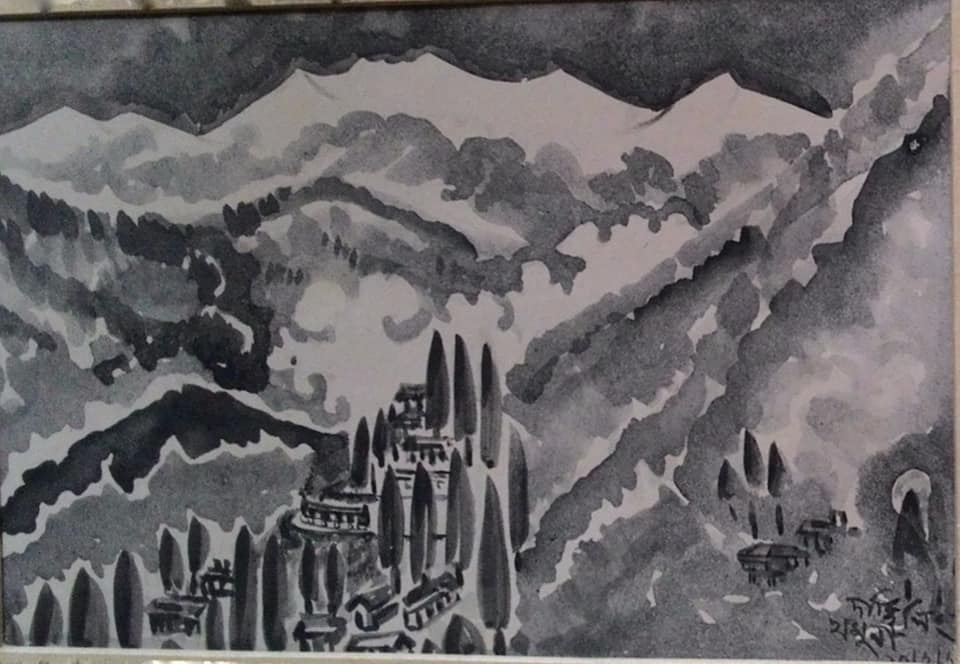
Pen and ink wash by Jamuna Sen
Other works

=== Murals ===
Jamuna worked on several murals in Santiniketan. According to "The Santiniketan Murals," she was part of the teams that worked on the murals in the following buildings: Santoshalaya (inside the hall), Sree Sadan hostel, Pearson memorial hospital (outer wall), Kala Bhavana Old Nandan (west wing) and Dinantika (ground floor).

=== The Constitution of India (Calligraphed and Illuminated Version) ===
Jamuna also worked as part of the team illustrating the Constitution of India under the guidance of Nandalal Bose.

Illustrations for the Constitution of India
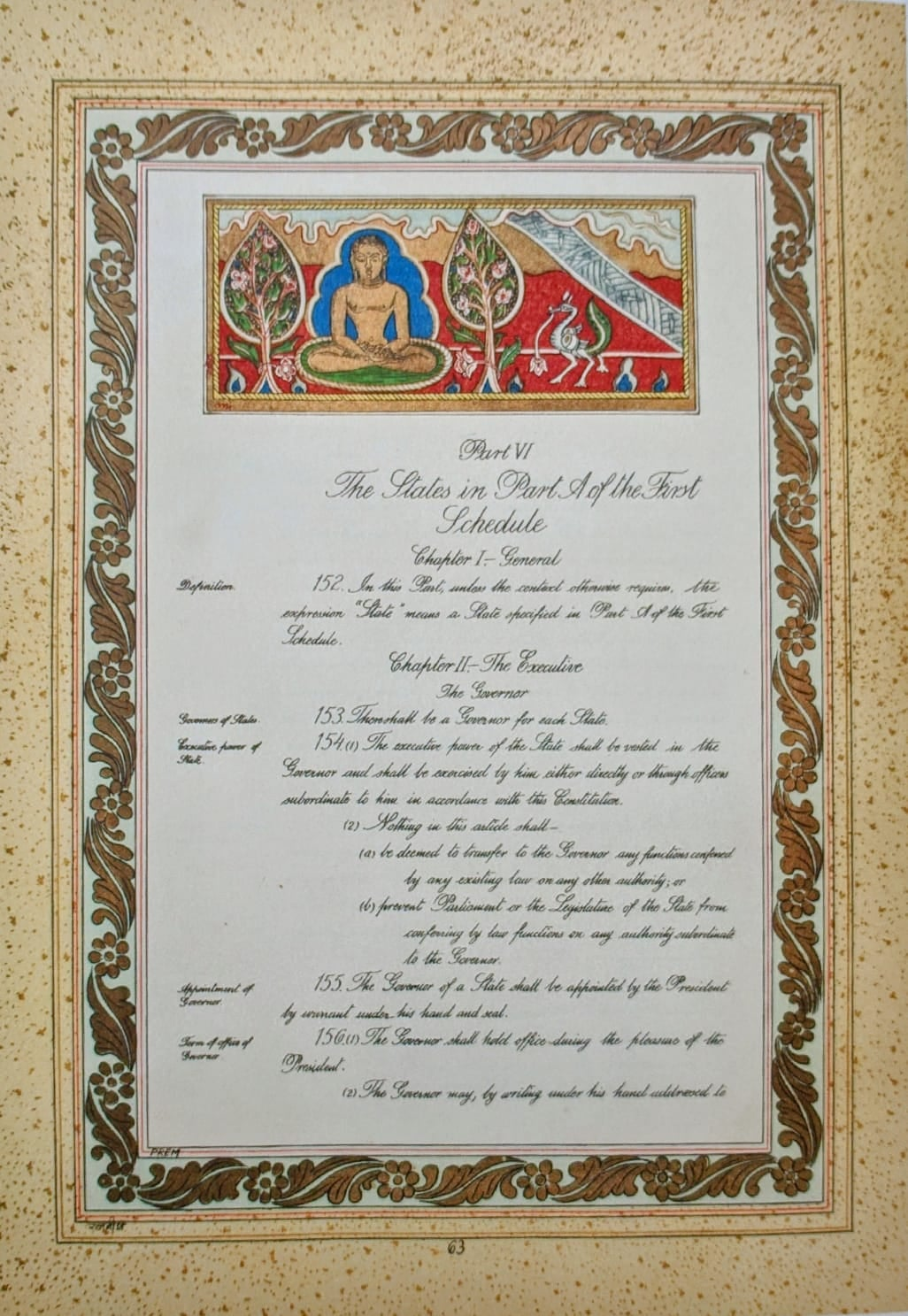
Title Page to Part VI of the Constitution of India - Illustration by Jamuna Sen

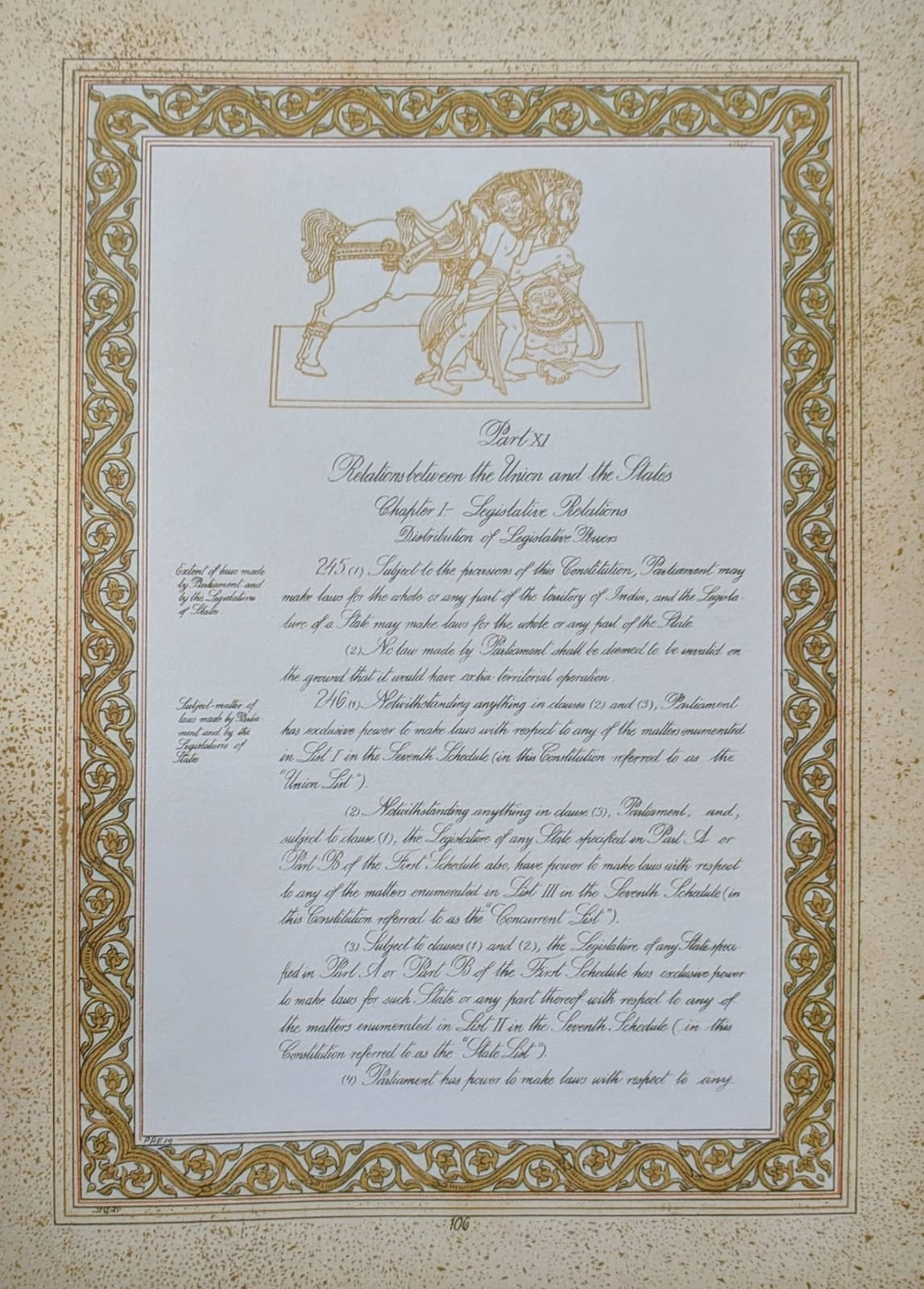
Title Page to Part XI of the Constitution of India - Illustration by Jamuna Sen
Constitution of India

== Karusangha ==
Apart from her artistic career, Jamuna Sen added an important chapter in the institutional history of Santiniketan. Nandalal had started an organisation called Karusangha in 1930, which did not last very long. Around 1960, the modern incarnation of Karusangha started under the leadership of Jamuna Sen. As noted above, this evolved from the certificate course in design at Kala Bhavana. As her daughter-in-law Deepa Sen writes "Even after her regular teaching duties and chores for running a home, Ma felt that the women of Santiniketan among her students would benefit from an organisation to enable them to earn a living through the skills they learnt from her. This was the idea behind the establishment of Karusangha in 1960… To this day, her students are using her designs to create works of Batik, embroidery etc… Women from many poor families have benefited from this."

Jamuna Sen's designs for Karusangha products
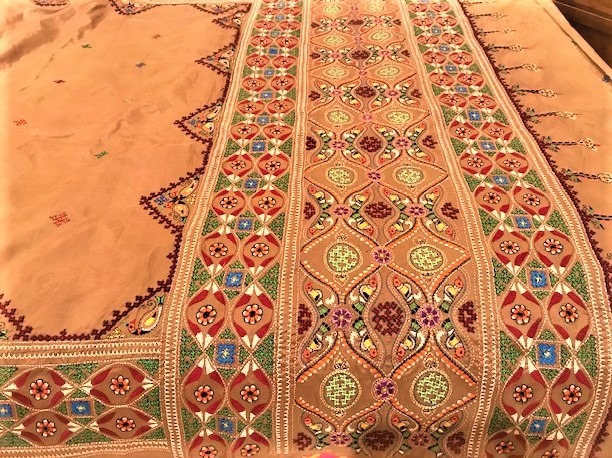
Embroidery Sari, design by Jamuna Sen

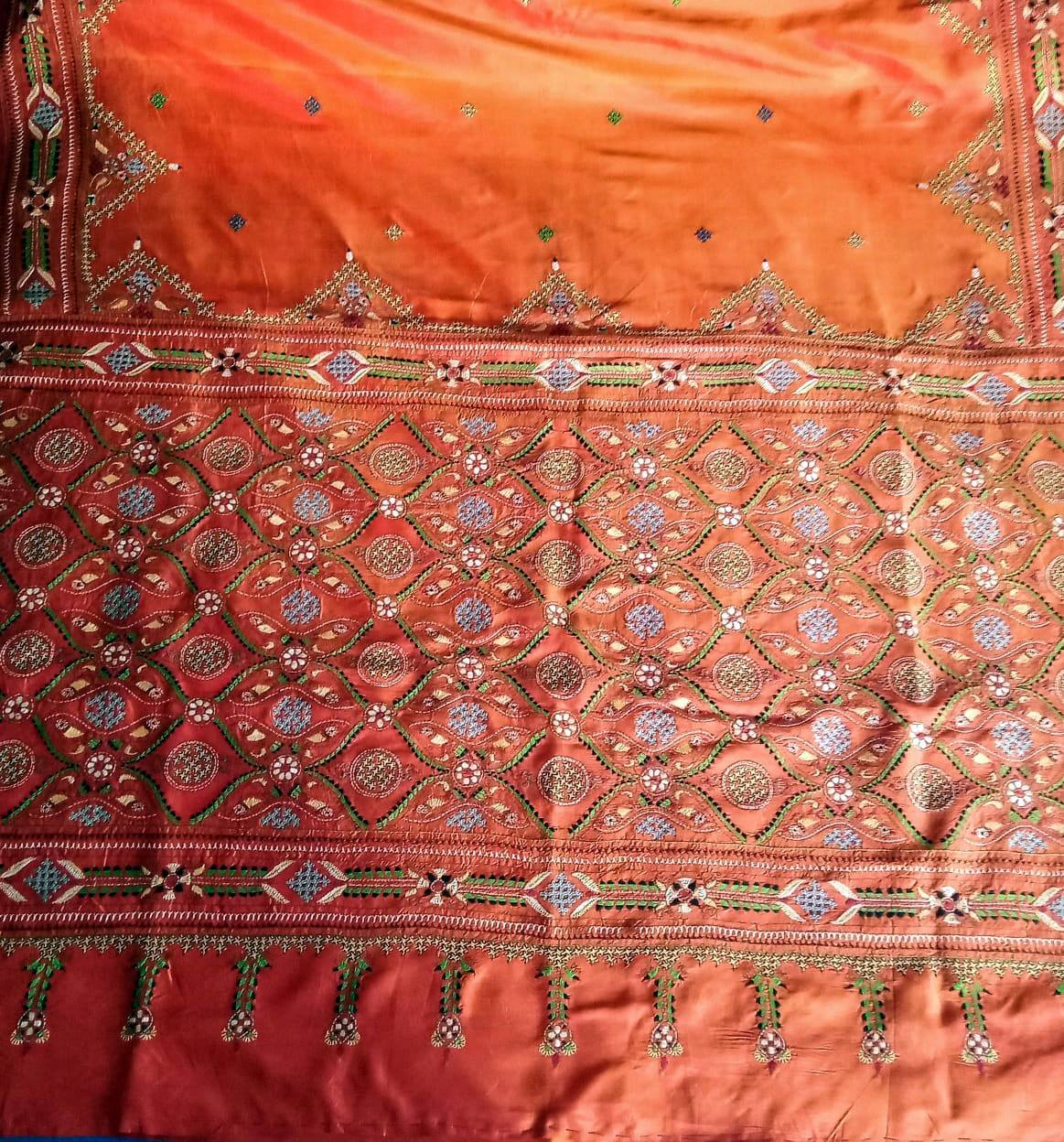
Embroidery Sari, design by Jamuna Sen

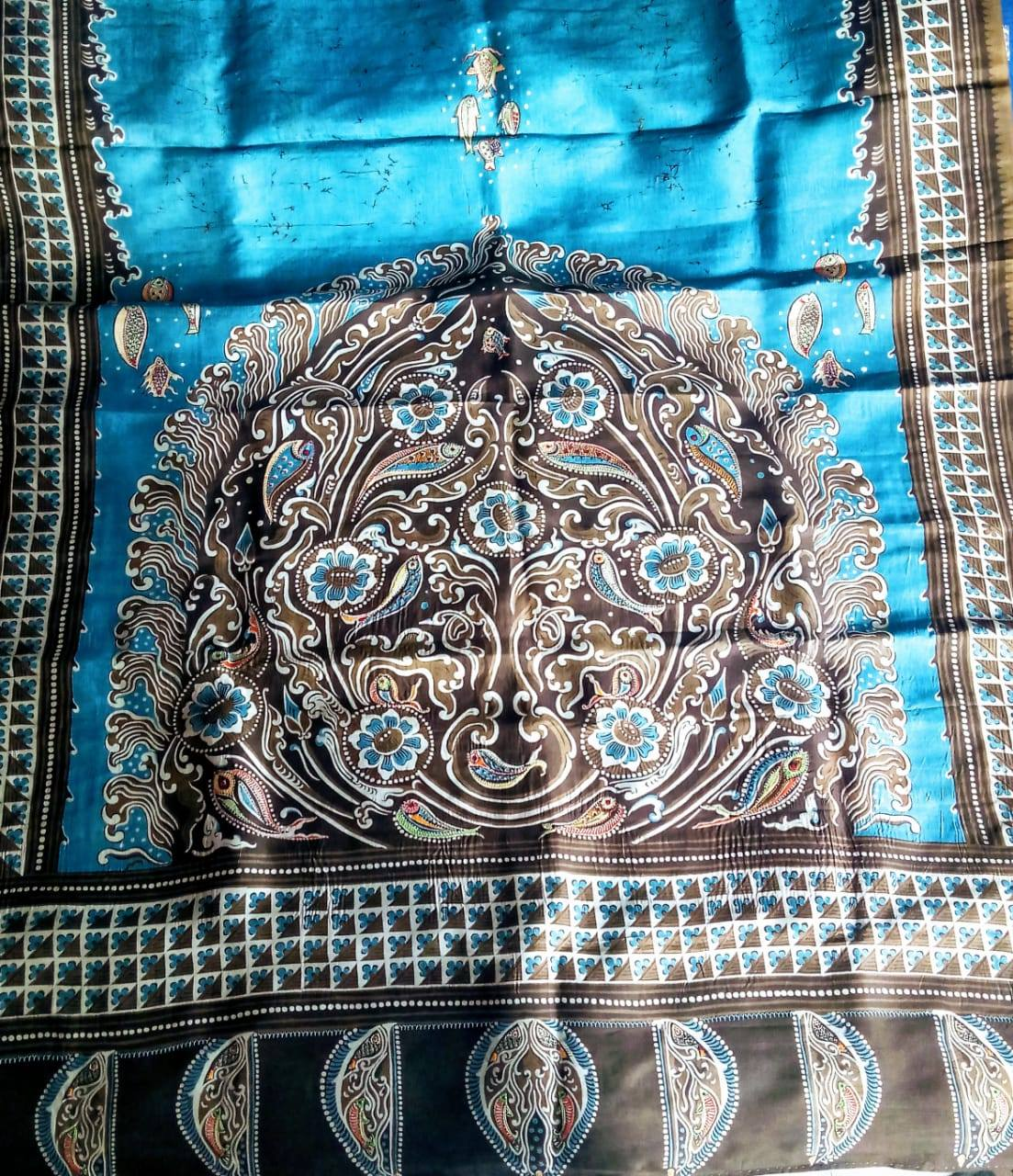
Batik Sari, design by Jamuna Sen

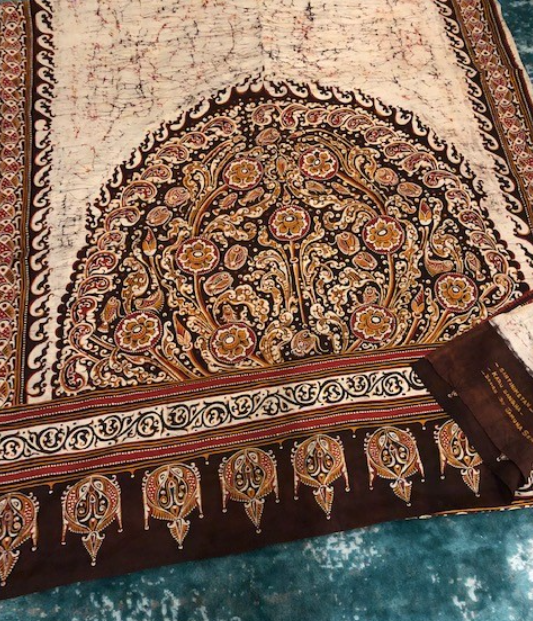
Batik Sari, design by Jamuna Sen
Designs for Karusangha
Jamuna Sen and family
Nandalal Bose and family 1956

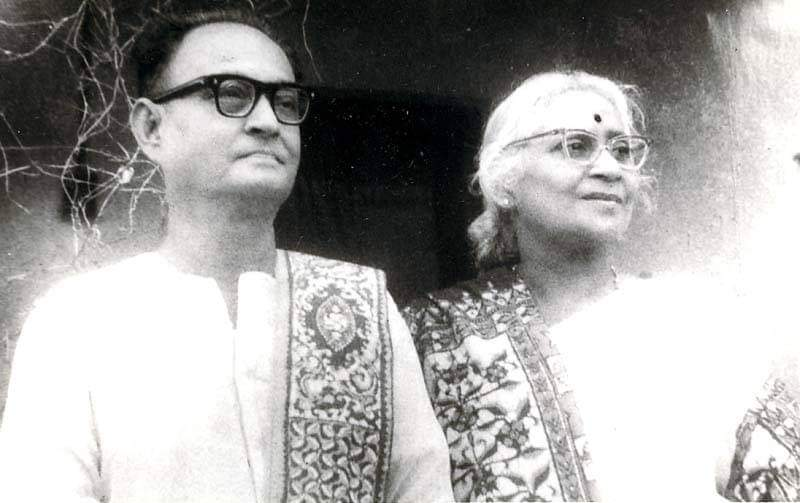
Jamuna Sen with her husband Keshab Chandra Sen

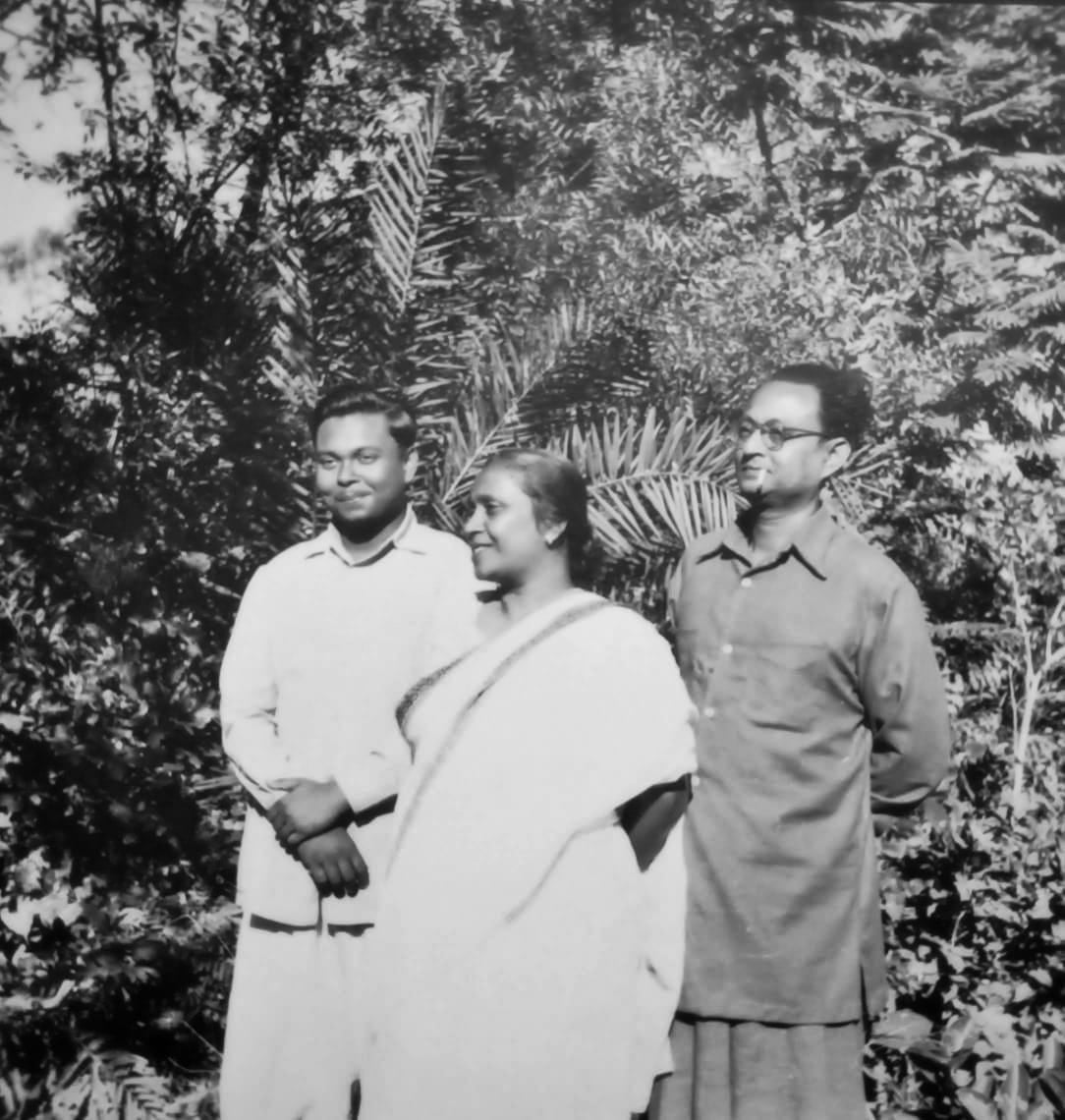
Jamuna Sen with husband Keshab Chandra Sen and son Suprabuddha Sen

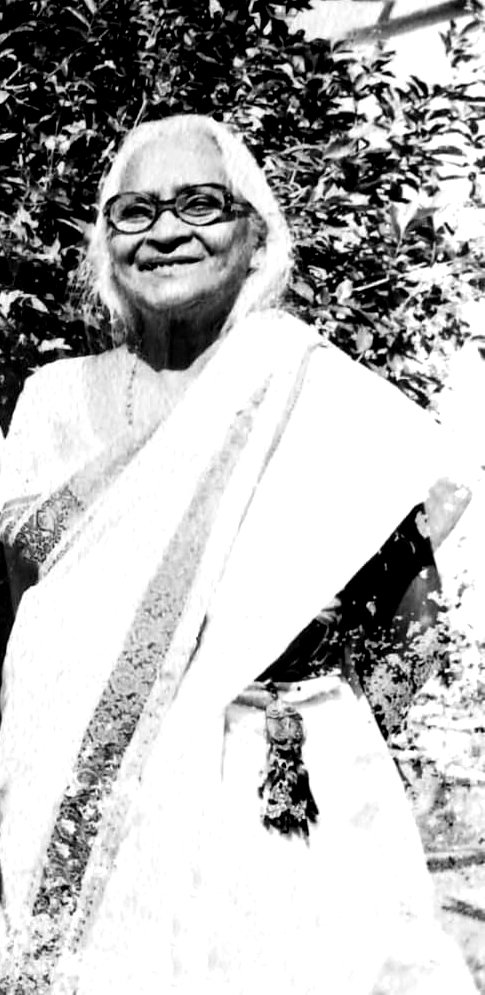
Jamuna Sen
family photos
