= Surendranath Kar =

Artist and architect born in India

- Born: 5 March 1892; Munger, Bihar, British India
- Died: 2 August 1970 (aged 78); Durgapur, West Bengal, India
- Occupations: Artist, architect
- Years active: 1917-1990
- Known for: Indian architecture
- Spouse: Surama Kar
- Children: Sumit Kar (son); Sukirti Kar (son)
- Parent(s): Dinanath Kar (father); Mokhada Kar (mother)
- Relatives: Nandalal Bose (cousin)
- Awards: Padma Shri

Surendranath Kar (5 March 1892– 2 August 1970) was an Indian artist and architect, known for amalgamating the Indian architectural style with western and eastern styles of architecture. Born in 1892 in Haveli Kharagpur under Munger District of Bihar in British India, Kar did his primary learning of art under his cousin, renowned Bengali painter, Nandalal Bose, and later under Abanindranath Tagore, the nephew of Nobel Laureate, Rabindranath Tagore. It was Bose who in 1911 took the 19 year old Kar to Abanindranath who not only advised the teenager to take up painting but taught him elementary drawing under his own guidance. Later in 1915, he joined Vichitra Club, founded by the Tagore family, as a teacher of art as also helping organise the club's activities. During this period, Lord Carmichael, the then Governor of Bengal bought a few of the works done by Kar. Kar also actively assisted Abanindranath and Nandalal in helping the newly founded Acharya Jagadish Chandra Bose Institute building in Calcutta to fulfil its artistic aspects. In 1917, when Tagore set up Brahmacharyasrama, the precursor of later day Shantiniketan, he joined the institution as per Tagore's wish and worked as an art teacher. Two years later, he moved to Kala Bhavana of Tagore as a faculty member.

Kar, who was a companion of Tagore in many of his overseas visits, used the exposure he received to western and eastern architecture, to evolve his own style by consciously absorbing what was beautiful or useful and, later, designed many buildings for Shantiniketan applying it to the life there adding new dimensions. He introduced lithography for Kala Bhavan students after his trip to Italy with Tagore in 1924. Similarly, he picked up the Batik art and various aspects of dress designing, home decoration, stage designing etc. during his 1927 trip to Malaya, Indonesia, Java Sumatra which he used successfully in the stage decoration for Tagore's dance drama, plays etc. But architecture was Surendranath's forte and he will be remembered as the one who evolved a completely Indian style of architecture, yet embodying various styles from all over the world. Among his notable works that can be seen even today in Shantiniketan are Singha Sadan, Kala Bhavan, Dinantika, China Bhavan, Hindi Bhavan, Sangeet Bhavan, Ratan Kuthi, Udayan, Konark, Shyamali, Punascha, Udichi and the adjacent garden designs. Surendranath's architectural designs are littered throughout the country even beyond Shantiniketan. He designed the palatial building called "The Retreat" (now Calico Textile Museum) at Ahmedabad at the invitation of Ambalal Sarabhai. The township of Bokaro Thermal Power Station, the memorial of Deshbandhu Chittaranjan Das and the Mahajati Sadan in Kolkata, among his other notable works. He also designed the assembly hall for Rajghat Besant School (then under J. Krishnamurti and now run by Krishnamurti Foundation) in Varanasi, besides the Ganges, after being sent by Tagore upon special request. Tagore has dedicated two of his books to Surendranath – Russiar Chithi (Letters from Russia) and Arogya (Recovery). He served efficiently as the secretary of Vishwabharati from 1935 to 1947 and also as the Principal of Kala Bhavan from 1951 to 1955. Surendranath got married in 1932 to Surama Majumder (alias Nutu), also a student of the Ashram in Shantiniketan and daughter of Shrish Chandra Majumder. They had two sons – Sumit and Sukirti.

The Government of India honoured him in 1959, with the award of Padma Shri, the fourth highest Indian civilian award for his services to the nation.

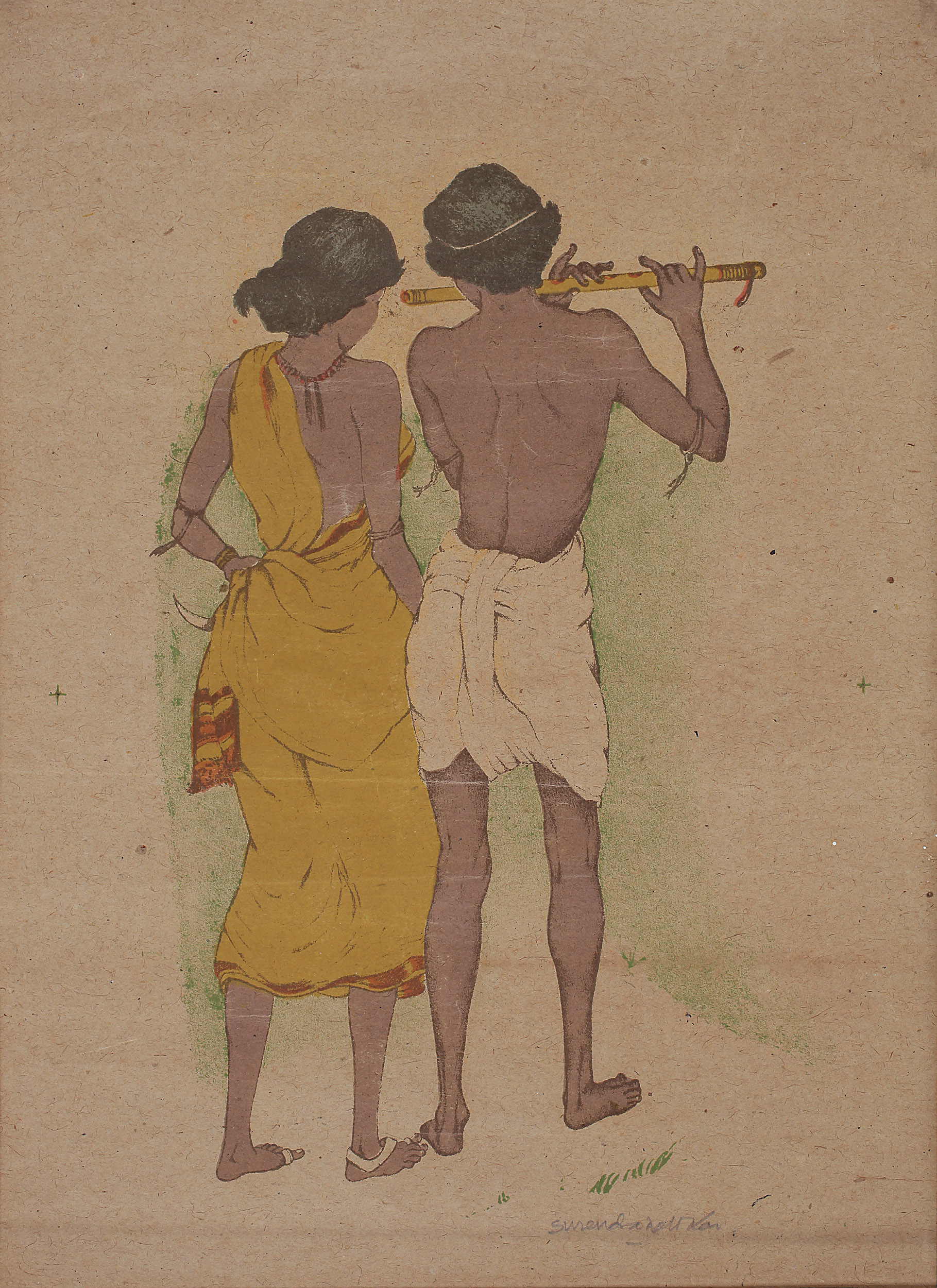
Untitled (Santhal Couple), Chromolithograph on paper, c. 1940s, 13.2 x 8.5 in., DAG Museums

Surendranath Kar died in 1970 at the age of 78.

== See also ==
- Shantiniketan
- Kala Bhavana
- Nandalal Bose
- Abanindranath Tagore
