= G. Deviprasad =

G. Devi Prasad Rao
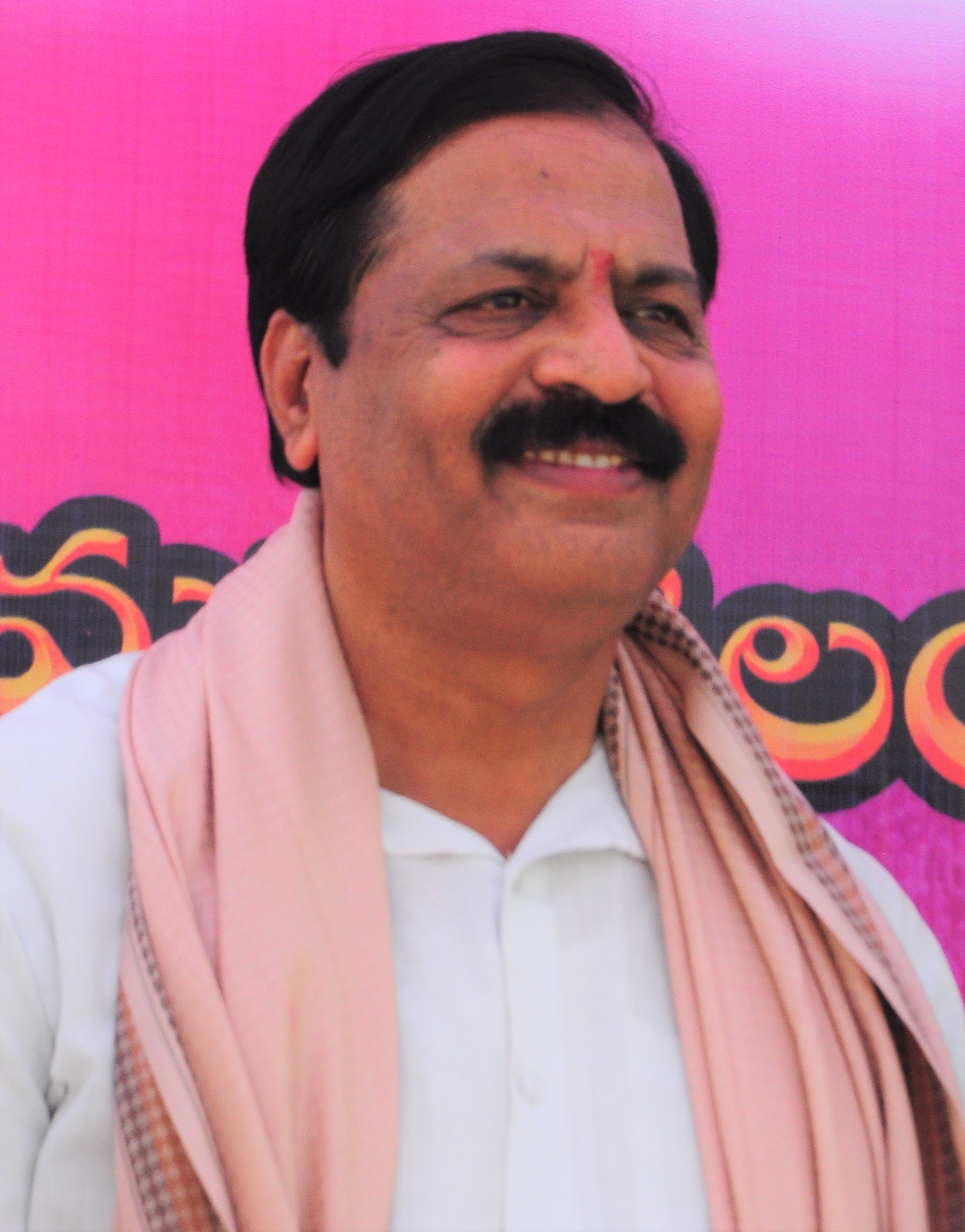
- Other name: Devanna
- Occupations: Chairman - Telangana state Beverages Corporation. Politician, former government servant
- Known for: Telangana movement, Employees Leader

Gundavarapu Devi Prasad Rao is a Telangana State activist and Present Chairman For Telangana State Beverages Corporation Limited and Former President of Telangana Non-Gazetted Officers Association. He along with his union are at the forefront of Telangana Movement.

== Career ==
He joined Andhra Pradesh State Government in 1979 in Irrigation department. He was earlier the General Secretary of TNGO.

=== Political career ===
He was invited to contest for MLC by the Chief Minister of Telangana, K Chandrashekhar Rao, owing to his active role in Telangana movement. He is contesting as MLC from Hyderabad Rangareddy Mahabubnagar graduates Constituency. TRS Party is supporting him. He filed his nomination on 25 February 2015 with support of the TRS. He resigned from his government service for contesting in the MLC election 2015.
