= Devi Prasad (artist) =

- Born: 1921; Uttar Pradesh, British Raj
- Died: 1 June 2011 (aged 89–90); Delhi, India
- Education: Shantiniketan and Sevagram
- Known for: Painting

Devi Prasad (1921 – 1 June 2011) was an Indian artist and peace activist. He was a pioneering studio potter, painter, designer, photographer, art educator and peace activist.

== Early life ==
Devi Prasad studied at Rabindranath Tagore's Shantiniketan and also at Sevagram.

== Career, peace activism and death ==
A major exhibition, The Making of the Modern Indian Artist-Craftsman, was held in New Delhi in May 2010, wherein his works spanning 65 years beginning with some of Devi Prasad's earliest artworks – a selection of paintings made in Santiniketan in 1938 – and ends with a showcasing of some of the last (from 2003 to 2004) that were made the last time he used his studio in Delhi. Naman Ahuja, who curated the exhibition, was an apprentice in his studio and has written extensively about his teacher remembering Prasad as a compassionate, deep-thinking person. Devi Prasad was also a lifelong pacifist and peace activist promoting ideals of Mahatma Gandhi and Rabindranath Tagore.

He worked internationally with War Resisters' International (WRI) for several decades, serving in its London office as general secretary from 1962 to 1972 prior to his term as chair from 1972 to 1975. His history of the organization, War is a Crime Against Humanity: The story of War Resisters' International, was published in 2005.

Devi Prasad died in Delhi on 1 June 2011.

== See also ==
- List of peace activists
