= Kala Bhavana =

Fine arts school of Visva-Bharati University

- Visva-Bharati University
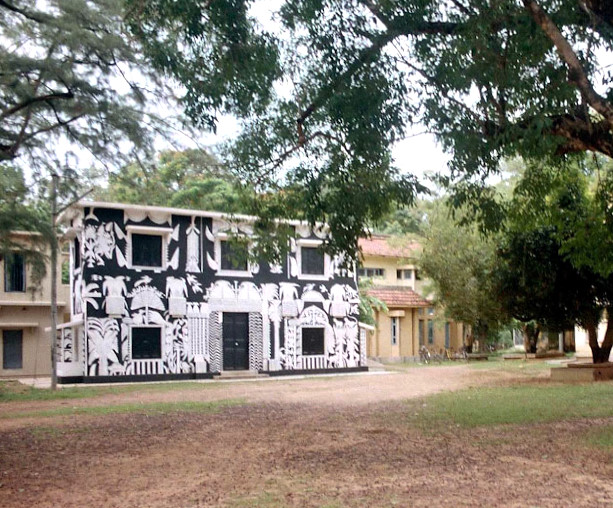
- Kala Bhavana, Santiniketan
- Location: Santiniketan, West Bengal, India
- Coordinates: 23.6815°N 87.6829°E
- Founder: Rabindranath Tagore
- Established: 1919
- Website: Kala Bhavan official website

Kala Bhavana (Institute of Fine Arts) is the fine arts faculty of Visva-Bharati University, in Shantiniketan, India. It is an institution of education and research in visual arts, founded in 1919, it was established by Nobel laureate Rabindranath Tagore.

== History ==
Kala Bhavana was established in 1919. Although art historians have not been able to determine its exact date of foundation, it celebrated its centenary in 2019. Asit Kumar Haldar was an art teacher at Santiniketan Vidyalaya from 1911 to 1915 and was in charge of Kala Bhavana from 1919 to 1921. In 1919, when it first started functioning, it started teaching music and art. By 1933, the two streams were separated into two different schools, Kala Bhavana and Sangit Bhavana.

Kala Bhavan, Shantiniketan

Upon its establishment in 1919, Tagore invited noted painter Nandalal Bose, a disciple of Abanindranath Tagore, founder of the Bengal school of art movement, to become the first principal of the institution. In the coming years stalwarts like Benode Behari Mukherjee and Ramkinkar Baij became associated with the college, and in time gave a new direction not just to the institution but also to modern Indian painting. At Santiniketan, the ideas of Rabindranath Tagore on art and teaching continued for a long time as a monumental model. Subsequently, they developed in the art arena of Santiniketan, the three pillars of ideas – Nandalal Bose, Benode Behari Mukherjee and Ramkinkar Baij. They together raised Santiniketan to a level of unique eminence in the field of modern art in twentieth-century India.

In 1997, R. Siva Kumar, leading art historian, curated an exhibition, Santiniketan: The Making of a Contextual Modernism, at the National Gallery of Modern Art. The exhibition, brought together about a hundred works each of the four modern Indian artists, namely Nandalal Bose, Rabindranath Tagore, Ram Kinker Baij and Benode Behari Mukherjee on the centre stage and put the Santiniketan art movement into focus. R.Siva Kumar argued that the "Santiniketan artists did not believe that to be indigenous one has to be historicist either in theme or in style, and similarly to be modern one has to adopt a particular trans-national formal language or technique. Modernism was to them neither a style nor a form of internationalism. It was critical re-engagement with the foundational aspects of art necessitated by changes in one’s unique historical position".

Subsequently, as principal of Kala Bhavana, Dinkar Kaushik reshaped it for contemporary art practices. He invited sculptor Sarbari Roy Choudhury, Ajit Chakraborty, graphic artist Somnath Hore and painters Sanat Kar and Lalu Prasad Shaw to join Kala Bhavana as teachers. Amongst the many things he did to revolutionize the institution was to hold Nandan Mela. On 1–2 December, Nandan Mela celebrates the birth anniversary of Nandalal Bose. "The students involve in various kinds of activities including art stalls put up by the Painting, Sculpture, Ceramics, Graphics, Design and Art History Departments. These stalls have artworks made by the students and teachers ranging from calendars to craft items, diaries, stationery, fashion jewelry, paintings, prints, saras (clay plates), and ceramics, wood and metal sculptures for sale at affordable prices."

== College overview ==
Buddha statue in the campus

The college has an art gallery, Nandan, exhibiting sculptures, frescoes and murals. In the 1960s, the Birlas and Goenkas families had built two girls hostels named after them. Kala Bhavana has 17,000 original art works by eminent Indian and Far-Eastern masters, and is now seeking outside support for preserving and displaying these.

Nandalal Bose became the first principal in 1923 and was followed by artists including Benode Behari Mukherjee, Ramkinkar Baij, K. G. Subramanyan, Dinkar Kaushik, R. Siva Kumar, Somnath Hore and Jogen Chowdhury. Amongst others who distinguished themselves in the art arena of Santiniketan were Gouri Bhanja, Jamuna Sen, Sankho Chaudhuri and Sanat Kar.

The school offers a Bachelor of Fine Arts degree and a Master of Fine Arts degree, as well as certificate degrees in painting, sculpture, mural painting, printmaking, design (textiles/ceramics) and art history.

== In popular culture and in history ==
Emblem of India

Nandalal Bose was assigned the task of decorating the original copy of the Constitution of India and he drew in several of his students for the work. It included Bani Patel, Gauri Bhanja, Jamuna Sen, Amala Sarkar, Sumitra Narayan, Vinayak Masoji, Dinanath Bhargava, Kripal Singh Shekhawat, Jagdish Mittal and others. The brief was to illustrate 34-inch borders in 300-odd pages with patterns from different historical ages of the subcontinent. The document was adopted on 26 January 1950. Dinanath Bhargava, then 21 years old, was also given the task of adapting the design of the national emblem. Beohar Rammanohar Sinha illustrated the preamble and certain other pages. R. Siva Kumar said that it was indeed a matter of pride that artists from Kala Bhavana embellished the prestigious document.

In 2011, to mark the 150th birth anniversary of Rabindranath Tagore, Rabindra Chitravali was released, the four-volume set covered masters' painting oeuvre consisting of 1,600 paintings, from Rabindra Bhavana (another institution of the university) and Kala Bhavana collection, along with 200 paintings from other institutions across India.

Satyajit Ray, the legendary film maker, studied here in 1940-1941, under Benode Behari Mukherjee, and later made a noted documentary on his teacher, The Inner Eye (1972). He had earlier made a 54-minute black-and-white documentary, Rabindranath Tagore, on the life of the poet on the occasion of his birth centenary. The film won the President's Gold Medal Award, New Delhi, 1961 and the Golden Seal, Locarno, 1961.

Ramkinkar is an incomplete personality study or documentary on sculptor Ramkinkar Baij created by legendary filmmaker Ritwik Ghatak. He started creating the film in 1975. The film was almost complete but it still remained unfinished for the death of Ritwik Ghatak.

Santiniketan has nine original ink brush works of Xu Beihong, one of the pioneers of Chinese modern art, all painted during the artists visit to Santiniketan in 1939-40. He had stayed in Tan Yun-Shan's old house near Cheena Bhavana. In August 2019, his son, Xufangfang, who had come on a follow-up visit, said that he received inspiration from the creative environment at Visva Bharati.

India has a long history of cultural relations with Japan. In 1902, Tenshin Okakura and Rabindranath Tagore met in Kolkata. On returning to Japan, Okakura sent two distinguished artists, Yokoyama Taikan and Hishida Shunsō to Kolkata, where they met Rabindranath Tagore and Abanindranath Tagore. Rabindranath Tagore went five times to Japan – 1916, 1917, 1924 and 1929 twice. Nampu Katayama visited India in 1916. On an invitation from Tagore, Shokin Katsuta stayed in Santiniketan and worked as art teacher from 1905 to 1907. Kousetsu Nosu came to India in 1918. He met Kampu Arai in Kolkata, and the two together went to Ajanta for copying the frescoes there. In 1932 Nosu again came to India, to paint frescoes in the new Buddhist Vihara at Sarnath. On completing his work at Sarnath, he visited Kala Bhavana at Santiniketan to learn more about frescoes. Kampo Arai was in India from 1916 to 1918 and visited Santiniketan during the period. Akino Fuku was visiting professor at Santiniketan in 1962. Ikuo Hirayama has painted in India under the title Silk Road paintings. Nishida Shun'ei came to India in 1995. Koreshiko Hino visited Santiniketan in 2006.

== Notable people ==
This is a list of notable alumni and teachers of Kala Bhavana, listed alphabetically by last name.

=== Faculty ===
- Asit Kumar Haldar, was art teacher in Santiniketan Vidyalaya from 1911 to 1915 and was in charge of Kala Bhavana from 1919 to 1921.
- Stella Kramrisch, American art historian, taught at Kala Bhavana, Santiniketan in 1922–24. A skilled dancer she taught "musical drill" to the children of Santiniketan ashrama. She was conferred Desikottama and Padma Bhusan.
- R. Siva Kumar, who studied the history of art at Kala Bhavana, later joined as faculty and became its principal, is a leading art historian and has curated numerous art exhibitions.

=== Painters ===
- Jayasri Burman, an artist and painter working and living in Paris, graduated from Kala Bhavana.
- Jogen Chowdhury, eminent painter and parliamentarian, teaches at Kala Bhavana.
- Somnath Hore, sculptor and printmaker, taught at Kala Bhavana. He was the recipient of the Padma Bhusan award.
- Kailash Chandra Meher, painter, studied at Kala Bhavana. He was later conferred the Padma Shri award.
- A. Ramachandran, noted painter and Padma Bhusan award winner, was a student of Kala Bhavana.

=== Printmakers ===
- Krishna Reddy, master printmaker at Atelier 17 and sculptor, studied at Kala Bhavana.
- K.G. Subramanyan, noted painter and Padma Vibhushan award winner, was a student of Kala Bhavana and later came back to teach at Santiniketan.

== See also ==
- Notable people associated with Santiniketan
