= Nandalal Bose =

Indian artist and a pioneer of modern Indian art (1882-1966)

Padma Vibhushan Nandalal Bose
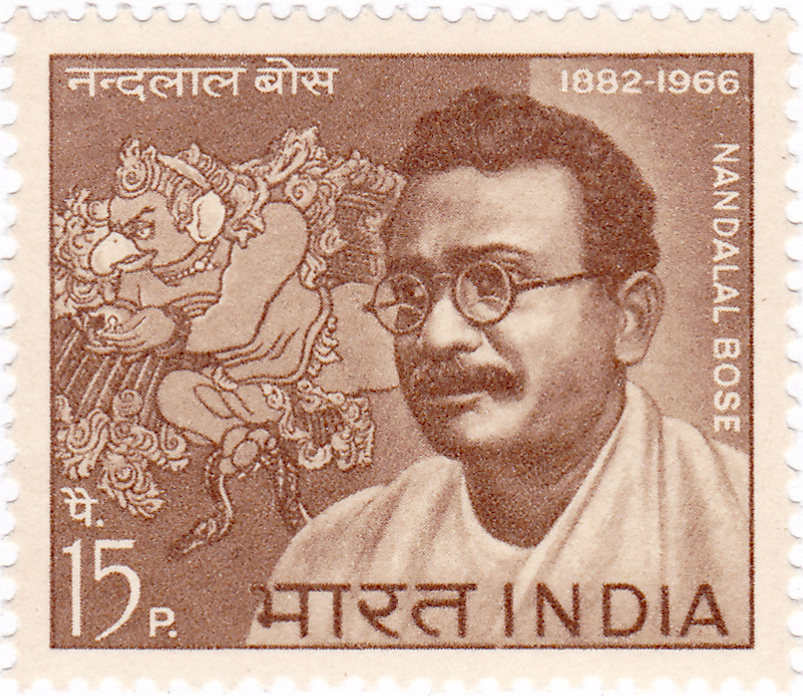
- Bose on a 1967 stamp of India
- Born: 3 December 1882; Haveli Kharagpur, Bengal Presidency, British India (now in Bihar, India)
- Died: 16 April 1966 (aged 83); Santiniketan, West Bengal, India
- Known for: Painting
- Movement: Contextual Modernism
- Spouse: Sudhira Devi (1903)
- Children: Gouri Bhanja (daughter); Jamuna Sen (daughter)
- Parents: Purnachandra Bose (father); Kshetramonidevi (mother)
- Relatives: Surendranath Kar (cousin)
- Awards: Principal of Kala Bhavana, Santiniketan (1921), Padma Vibhushan (1954), Fellow of the Lalit Kala Academy (1954), Deshikottama (1952), Honorary D.Litt, Silver Jubilee Medal, The Tagore Birth Centenary Medal, Honorary Doctor of the University of Calcutta

Nandalal Bose (3 December 1882 – 16 April 1966) was one of the pioneers of modern Indian art and a key figure of Contextual Modernism.

A pupil of Abanindranath Tagore, Bose was known for his "Indian style" of painting. He became the principal of Kala Bhavan, Santiniketan in 1921. He was influenced by the Tagore family and the murals of Ajanta; his classic works include paintings of scenes from Indian mythologies, women, and village life.

Today, many critics consider his paintings among India's most important modern paintings. In 1976, the Archaeological Survey of India, Department of Culture, Govt. of India declared his works among the "nine artists" whose work, "not being antiquities", were to be henceforth considered "to be art treasures, having regard to their artistic and aesthetic value".

He was given the work of illustrating the Constitution of India.

== Early life ==
Nandalal Bose was born on 3 December 1882 in a middle-class Bengali family at Haveli Kharagpur, in Munger district of Bihar state. The family originally hailed from Jejur, Hooghly District of West Bengal. His father, Purna Chandra Bose, was at that time working in the Darbhanga Estate. His mother Khetramoni Devi was a housewife with a skill in improvising toys and dolls for young Nandalal. From his early days Nandalal began taking an interest in modelling images and later, decorating Puja pandals.

In 1898, at the age of fifteen, Nandalal moved to Calcutta for his high school studies in the Central Collegiate School. After clearing his examinations in 1902, he continued his college studies at the same institution. In June 1903 he married Sudhiradevi, the daughter of a family friend. Nanadalal wanted to study art, but he was not given permission by his family. Unable to qualify for promotion in his classes, Nandalal moved to other colleges, joining the Presidency College in 1905 to study commerce. After repeated failures, he persuaded his family to let him study art at Calcutta's School of Art.

== Career ==
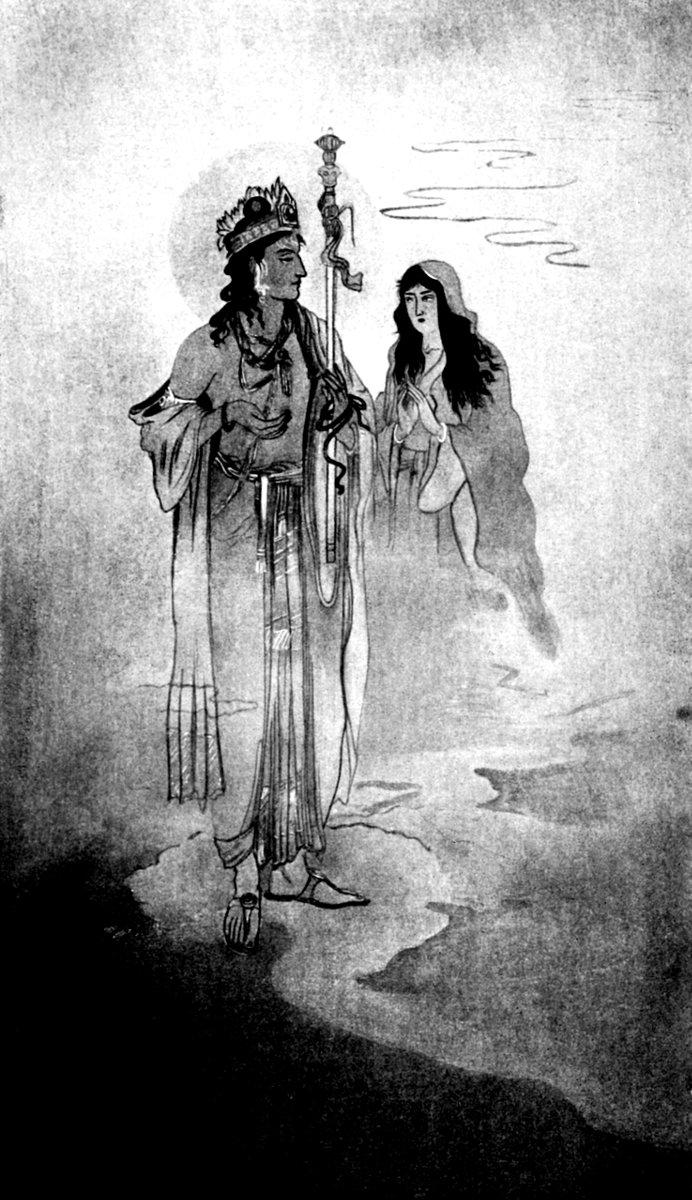
Yama and Savitri, from a painting by Nandalal Bose, 1913

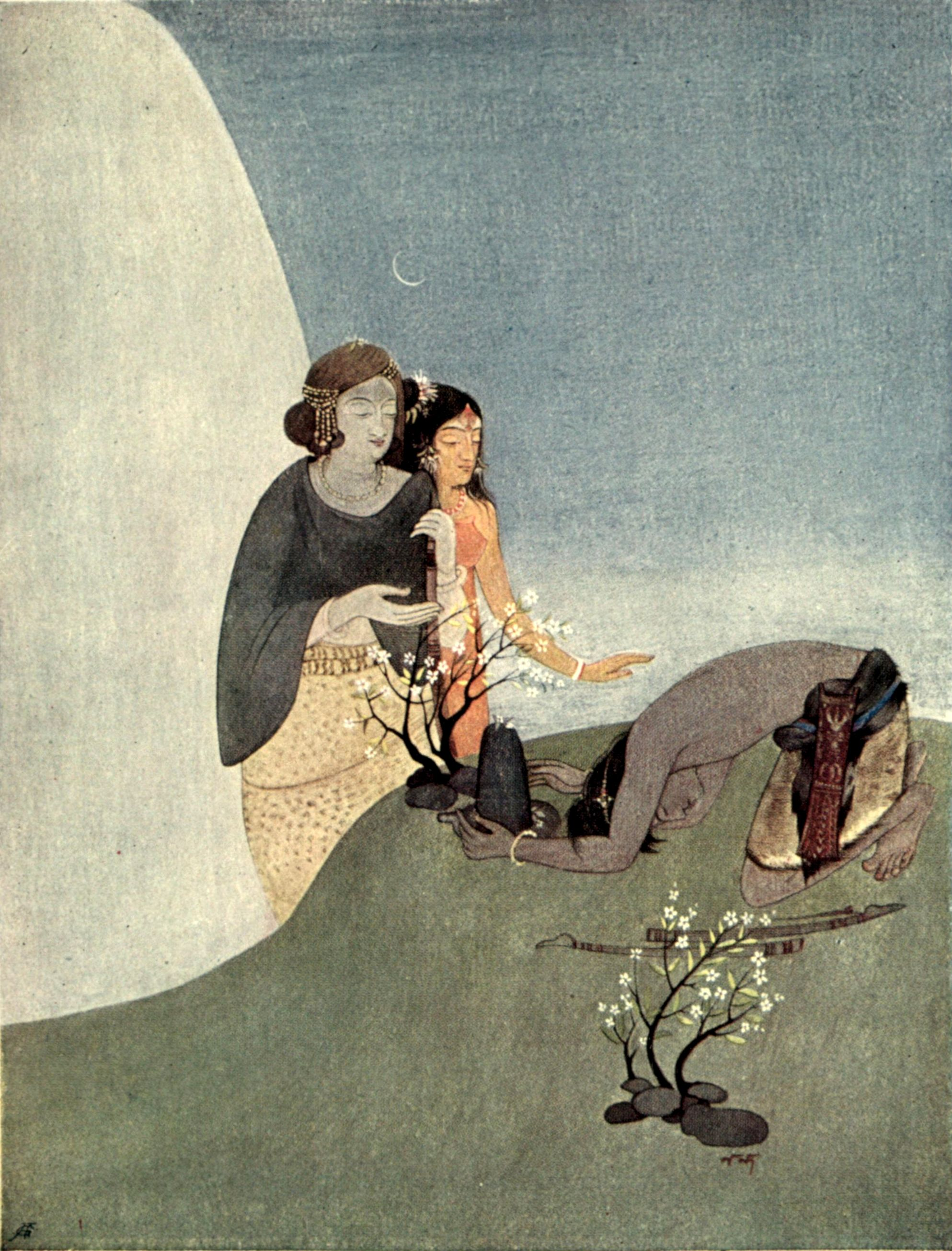
Kirat-Arjuna, 1914

As a young artist, Nandalal Bose was deeply influenced by the murals of the Ajanta Caves. He had become part of an international circle of artists and writers seeking to revive classical Indian culture; a circle that already included Okakura Kakuzō, William Rothenstein, Yokoyama Taikan, Christiana Herringham, Laurence Binyon, Abanindranath Tagore, and the seminal London Modernist sculptors Eric Gill and Jacob Epstein.

To mark the 1930 occasion of Mahatma Gandhi's arrest for protesting the British tax on salt, Bose created a black on white linocut print of Gandhi walking with a staff. It became the iconic image for the non-violence movement.

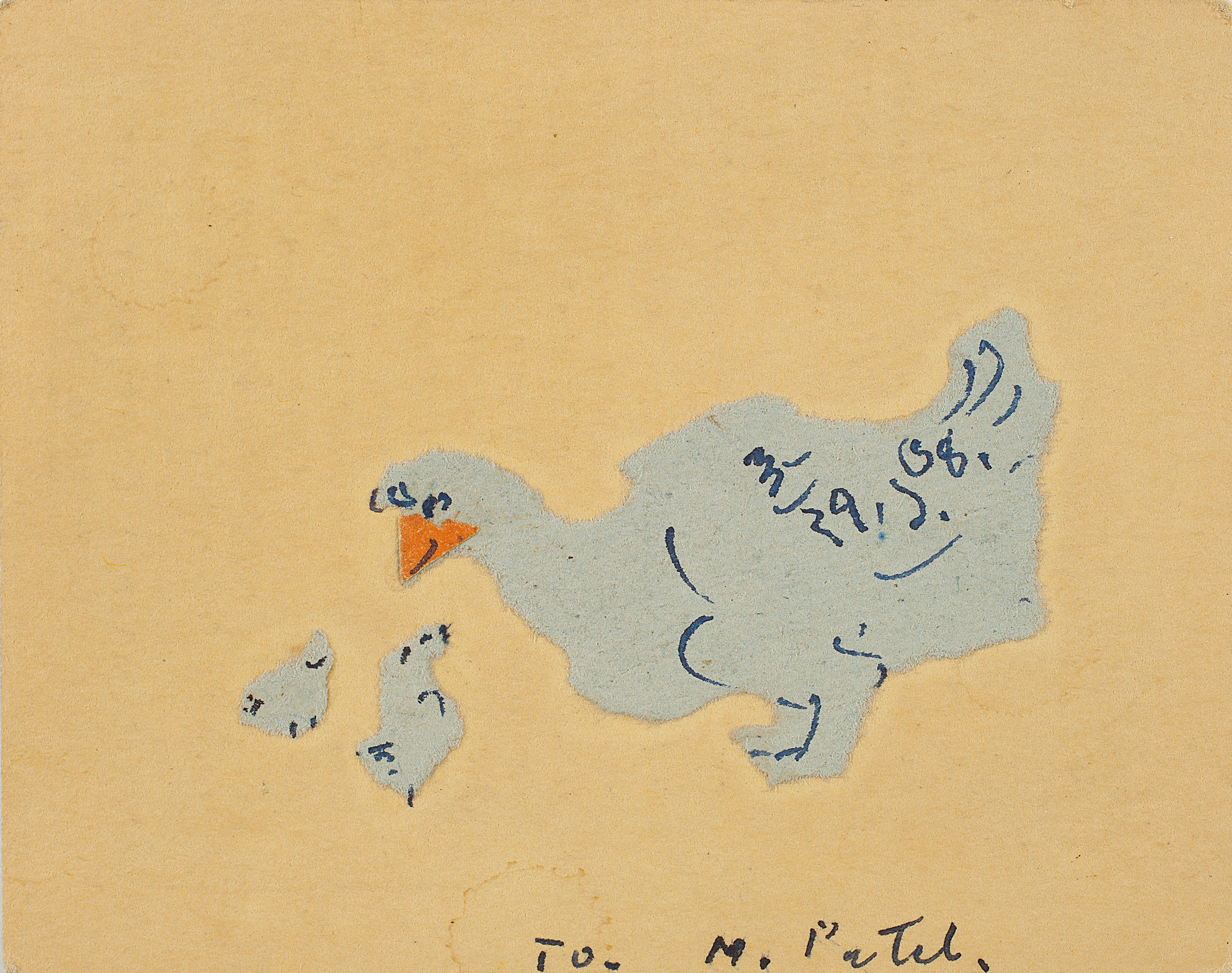
Untitled by Nandalal Bose, 1954, Collage and ink on paper, DAG Museums

His genius and original style were recognised by artists and art critics like Gaganendranath Tagore, Ananda Coomaraswamy and O. C. Ganguli. These lovers of art felt that objective criticism was necessary for the development of painting and founded the Indian Society of Oriental Art.

He became principal of the Kala Bhavana (College of Arts) at Tagore's International University Santiniketan in 1921.

He was also asked by Jawaharlal Nehru to sketch the emblems for the Government of India's awards, including the Bharat Ratna and the Padma Shri. Along with his disciple Rammanohar, Nandalal Bose took up the task of beautifying/decorating the original manuscript of the Constitution of India.

He died on 16 April 1966 in Santiniketan of natural causes.

Today, the National Gallery of Modern Art in Delhi holds 7000 of his works in its collection, including a 1930 black and white linocut of the Dandi March depicting Mahatma Gandhi, and a set of seven posters he later made at the request of Mahatma Gandhi for the 1938 Haripura Session of the Indian National Congress.

=== Selected artworks ===
A major collection of Bose's artworks is preserved and displayed at the National Gallery of Modern Art (NGMA) in New Delhi. His notable works span mythological themes, the Indian independence movement, and rural life:

- Mythological & Historical Themes: Sati (1907), Siva Drinking World Poison, and Parthasarthi.
- National Movement: The iconic 1930 linocut print of Mahatma Gandhi's Dandi March and the 1938 Haripura Congress Posters.
- Rural Life & Artisans: Tiller of the Soil, Pith Worker, and Pounding of Rice.
- Landscapes: Darjeeling and Fog.

== His place in Indian art ==
In his introduction for the Christie's catalogue, R. Siva Kumar wrote-

Nandalal Bose (1882–1966) occupies a place in the history of Modern Indian art that combines those of Raphael and Durer in the history of the Renaissance. Like Raphael, Nandalal was a great synthesizer, his originality lay in his ability to marshal discrete ideas drawn from Abanindranath Tagore, Rabindranath Tagore, E. B. Havell, Ananda Coomaraswamy, Okakura Kakuzo and Mahatma Gandhi into a unique and unified programme for the creation of a new art movement in India. And like Durer he combined a passion bordering on devotion with an irrepressible analytical mind that compelled him to prise open different art traditions and unravel their syntactic logic, and make them accessible to a new generation of Indian artists. But he did this so quietly and without self-assertive fanfare that the significance of his work is yet to be fully grasped even in India.

== Students ==
Some of his notable students were E.KUMARIL SWAMY Benode Behari Mukherjee, Ramkinkar Baij, Beohar Rammanohar Sinha, K. G. Subramanyan, A. Ramachandran, Pratima Thakur, Jahar Dasgupta, Satyajit Ray, Dinkar Kaushik, Amritlal Vegad, A.D.Jayathilake (1756), and Kiron Sinha

== Honours and awards ==
Nandalal Bose, who left a major imprint on Indian art, was the first recipient of a scholarship offered by the Indian Society of Oriental Art, founded in 1907.

In 1954, he became the first artist to be elected Fellow of the Lalit Kala Akademi, India's National Academy of Art. In 1954, Nandalal Bose was awarded the Padma Vibhushan.

In 1957, the University of Calcutta conferred honorary D.Litt. on him. Vishvabharati University honoured him by conferring on him the title of 'Deshikottama'.

The Academy of Fine Arts in Calcutta honoured Nandalal with the Silver Jubilee Medal. The Tagore Birth Centenary Medal was awarded to Nandalal Bose in 1965 by the Asiatic Society of Bengal.

Acharya Nandalal, an Indian documentary film on the artist was made by Harisadhan Dasgupta in 1984.

== Publications ==
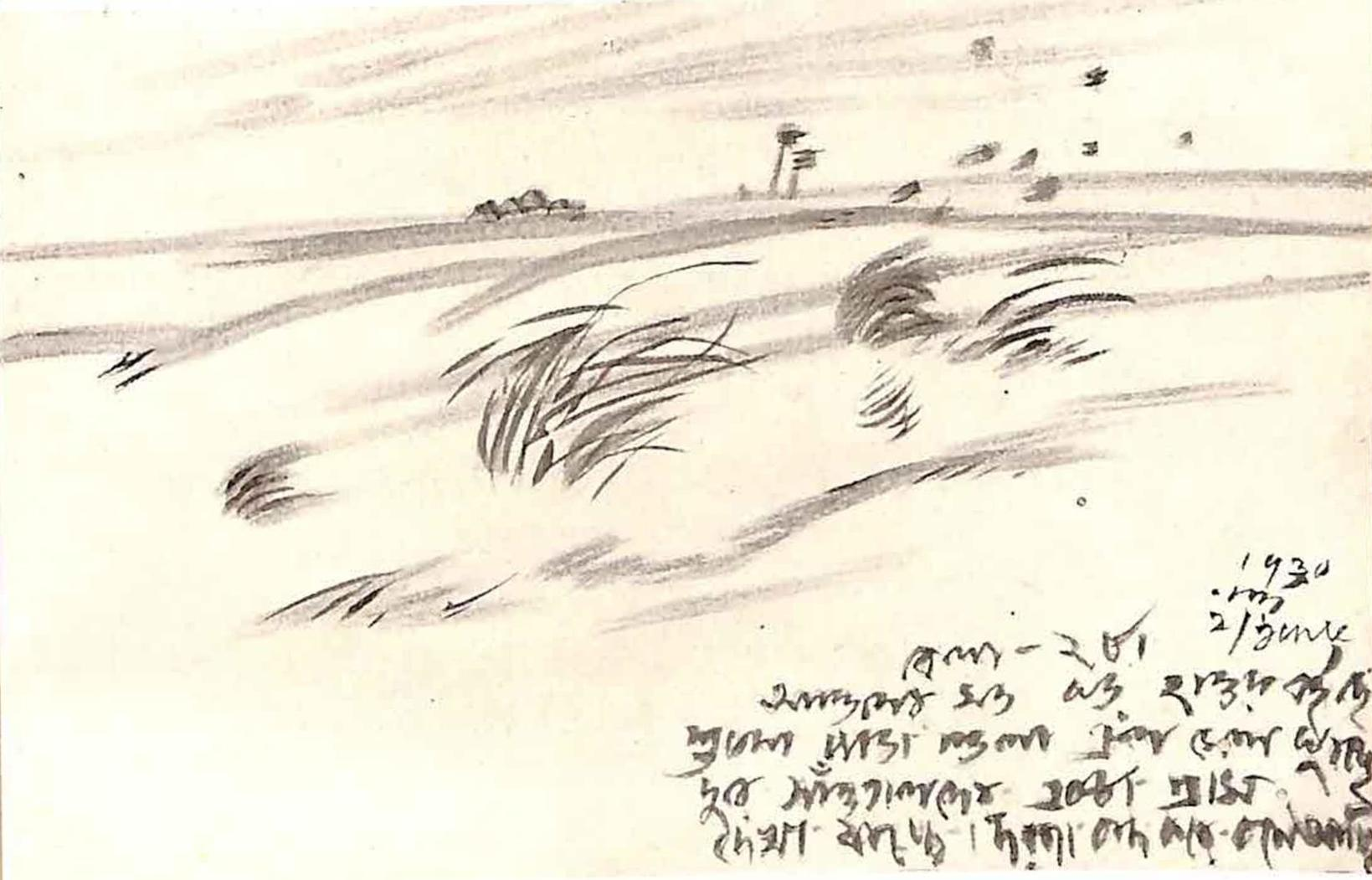
Illustration of the poem Rikto (রিক্ত; Empty ) in Rabindranath Tagore's Chharar Chhabi (ছড়ার ছবি).

- Drishti o srishti [Vision and the Creation] by Nandalal Bose, published by Visva-Bharati Granthana Vibhaga [ Edition Language - Bengali ]
- Shilpa Charcha [ শিল্প চর্চা ] by Nandalal Bose, published April 1956 by Visva Bharati [ Edition Language - Bengali ]
- Pictures from the life of buddha by Nandalal Bose
- Rupavali by Nandalal Bose
