= Sivakumar (name) =

Sivakumar is an Indian given name and surname used in South India, meaning "the son (Kumar) of the Hindu god Shiva" and referring to the Hindu god of war Kartikeya. Notable people with the name include:

== Given name ==
- Sivakumar (born 1941), Indian actor in Tamil cinema
- Sivakumar Ananth (born 1974), known as Siva Ananth, Indian film producer and director
- Sivakumar Jayakumar (born 1977), known professionally as Siva, Indian film director and screenwriter
- Sivakumar Varatharaju (born 1970), Indian-Malaysian politician
- Sivakumar Vijayan (born 1982), Indian cinematographer

== Surname ==
- B. Sivakumar, Indian director
- Bharanikkavu Sivakumar (1949–2007), Indian lyricist from Kerala
- Brindha Sivakumar (born 1980), Indian playback singer
- C. Sivakumar, Indian politician
- E. K. T. Sivakumar (born 1968), Indian chemist
- Ghantasala Sai Srinivas Sivakumar (born 1983), professionally known as Thaman S, Indian composer and playback singer
- Karthik Sivakumar (born 1977), Indian actor in Tamil cinema
- Lalitha Sivakumar, Indian music teacher and composer
- M. Sivakumar (born 1984), Malaysian footballer
- Mini Sivakumar (1961–2010), Indian visual artist
- Narayanan Shivakumar, Indian entrepreneur
- P. Sivakumar, Indian politician
- Pranav Sivakumar, American speller and amateur researcher
- Raghupathy Sivakumar, Indian professor at Georgia Tech
- Raman Siva Kumar (born 1956), Indian art historian, art critic, and curator
- Saravanan Sivakumar (born 1975), known by his stage name Suriya, Indian actor and film producer
- Sathyan Sivakumar, Indian actor and comedian
- Siddharth Sivakumar (born 1992), Indian curator, art critic, and writer
- Sujatha Sivakumar (born 1973), Indian actress
- T. N. Sivakumar (born 1957), Indian flutist guru
- V. M. C. Sivakumar, Indian politician
- V. P. Sivakumar (1947–1993), Indian writer and translator
- V. S. Sivakumar (born 1960), Indian politician
