= Paintings of Abanindranath Tagore =

Book by R. Siva Kumar

- Author: R. Siva Kumar
- Language: English
- Subject: Art
- Publisher: Pratikshan
- Publication date: 2008
- Publication place: India
- Pages: 383
- ISBN: 81-89323-09-1

Paintings of Abanindranath Tagore is a book on Abanindranath Tagore's paintings by art historian R. Siva Kumar. It is widely considered as a landmark book in the Indian art scene that brings together a large corpus of Abanindranath's work for the first time. It fulfils a glaring lacuna in the picture of this master of modern Indian art.

In the books R. Siva Kumar states, 'The social space that Abanindranath narrativized as an artist-flaneur is thus the subject of the Orientalist artist/writer read from the obverse. He reclaims the colonial subjects' right to narrate their stories that was arrogated to themselves by the colonial rulers and perpetuated by presenting their readings as 'objective'. Abanindranath reasserts this right by recasting the Nights (Arabian Nights), a text central to the Orientalist representation of the East, by urging us to read his act of imagination contrapuntally with the text authenticated by the Orientalist.'

Abanindranath Tagore (1871–1951) was an Indian painter and writer associated with the development of modern Indian art and the Bengal School.

Emerging during the early nationalist movement, Tagore was widely regarded as a foundational figure in nationalist art and Indian modernism. Alongside figures such as E. B. Havell, Ananda Coomaraswamy, and Sister Nivedita, he contributed to a shift in how Indian artists and audiences viewed traditional Indian art.

Initially trained under European artists, Tagore retained elements of academic realism throughout his career. However, through subsequent engagement with Asian art traditions, he adapted his post-Renaissance academic training into a more flexible, imaginative style. While he was aligned with cultural nationalism early in his career, his later work moved toward a more individualistic approach. Art historians have compared his mature aesthetic to the modernism of Charles Baudelaire, noting a focus on subjective experience rather than literal representation. His 1930 Arabian Nights series, for instance, uses the traditional tales as a framework to observe his immediate surroundings in Calcutta in the manner of a flâneur.

In addition to his visual art, Tagore was a prolific writer of Bengali literature. Despite his historical prominence, critical assessment of his full body of work was historically limited by a lack of accessible public collections and comprehensive publications

The book has also influenced other books and researches on Abanindranath Tagore. Ananya Vajpeyi in her Righteous Republic: The Political Foundations of Modern India highlights the contribution of R. Siva Kumar's Paintings of Abanindranath Tagore in foregrounding Abanindranath Tagore's art anew.

== See also ==
- R. Siva Kumar
- Santiniketan: The Making of a Contextual Modernism
- Abanindranath Tagore
- Rabindra Chitravali
- The Last Harvest : Paintings of Rabindranath Tagore (Book)
