= K.G. Subramanyan, a Retrospective =

2010 book by R. Siva Kumar

- Author: R. Siva Kumar
- Language: English
- Subject: Art
- Publisher: National Gallery of Modern Art
- Publication date: February 16, 2010
- Publication place: India
- Pages: 224 pages
- ISBN: 8187902132

K.G. Subramanyan, a Retrospective is a book by R. Siva Kumar, released on the occasion of the fourth and largest retrospective show of K.G. Subramanyan, which was curated by R. Siva Kumar at the National Gallery of Modern Art.

The exhibition consisted of 300 paintings including terracotta reliefs, reverse paintings on glass and acrylic, linocuts, lithographs, etching, silkscreens, drawings, studies, children's books, toys and saras-paintings on terracotta platters-and the photographs of murals. and the range of materials includes terracotta, glass, paper, wood porcelain and metal cement.

The book offers an insight into the creative processes of K.G. Subramanyan. While tracing the various aspects of his creativity, the book provides the influences that shaped him and gives a kaleidoscopic view of his six-decade long artistic journey from Kerala, Mahe, Santiniketan, Slade School in England, and later in various cities of Europe and America.

This book features as a part of the syllabus of Modern South Asian art at various universities.
