= Sensibility Objectified =

2010 book by R. Siva Kumar

Sensibility Objectified: The Sculptures of Sarbari Roy Choudhury
- Author: R. Siva Kumar
- Cover artist: Sarbari Roy Choudhury, Head, 1994
- Language: English
- Subject: Art
- Publisher: Mapin Publishing
- Publication date: February 16, 2010
- Publication place: India
- Pages: 136
- ISBN: 1890206032

Sensibility Objectified: The Sculptures of Sarbari Roy Choudhury is a book by R. Siva Kumar that discusses the life and sculptures of Sarbari Roy Choudhury. According to R. Siva kumar the 'sculptural sensibility' of Sarbari Roy Choudhury, represented in his figurative and animated works, reveals the artist's connection with the Indian traditions of sculpture, despite being strongly influenced by the West.

Some of Roy's best works are of classical musicians—Bade Ghulam Ali Khan, Ali Akbar Khan, Siddheshwari Devi and Kesarbai Kerkar. Starting from the 1950s, the monograph traces his work of each decade, revealing the artistic journey of one of India's leading sculptors.
