= Siddharth Sivakumar =

- Born: 1992 (age 33–34); Kerala, India
- Education: Visva Bharati University
- Occupations: Curator, Art critic, Writer
- Family: R. Siva Kumar

Siddharth Sivakumar is a curator, art critic, and writer. He is presently the Creative Director of a Kolkata-based gallery and archive space, Gallery Rasa. He is also the Curator & Director of the inaugural edition of Bengal Biennale, the largest arts festival of the region, that envisions itself as a cultural platform enriched by confluences, the meeting of history and the present, the tradition and the unorthodox, selfhood and community, home and the world. Siddharth's contribution to the art scene of Bengal and beyond has been significant with him organising and curating multiple impactful shows, including in his previous role as the Head of Visual Arts and Publication at the Kolkata-based multidisciplinary arts centre, Kolkata Centre for Creativity. He takes a keen interest in the matters of the art world and regularly writes for art magazines such as Art and Deal, ArtEast, and Art India. His articles on socio-cultural issues have appeared in National dailies including The Hindu Business Line, The Statesman, The Wire, and The Telegraph (India) among others.

== Family ==
Siddharth Sivakumar is the son of art historian R. Siva Kumar and Mini Sivakumar. He hails from a family of filmmakers that includes Adoor Gopalakrishnan and Padmarajan. Thus, coming from a background steeped in the arts, he is deeply passionate about making an impact in the world of art and culture.

== Early life and education ==
Siddharth spent his growing years in Santiniketan, completing his schooling from Patha Bhavana before pursuing a Bachelor's and master's degrees in English Literature from Visva-Bharati University. In 2015, he received the Charles Wallace Scholarship from the University of Edinburgh, Scotland and was also sent to Yunnan University, China as part of a student delegation from Visva-Bharati. He was selected for a short-term course ‘Researching the Contemporary’ offered by the Centre for the Study of Developing Societies in 2017.

== Career ==
Siddharth is presently the creative director of Gallery Rasa and the curator and director of the first edition of a one-of-its-kind arts festival in Bengal - the Bengal Biennale. He has organised and curated two landmark shows in Kolkata since assuming office at Gallery Rasa - "The World Through Abu's Eyes: A Centennial Celebration" and "Roots to Petals, Peaks to Sea: The Paintings of Chameli Ramachandran". In his earlier role as the Head of the Departments of Visual Arts and Publishing at Kolkata Centre for Creativity, Siddharth organised and executed over 30 wide-ranging exhibitions. Some of the major ones include a 3-volume Satyajit Ray Centenary Show — the final volume of which travelled to Kochi in collaboration with Kerala Lalithakala Akademi; a one-of-a-kind immersive exhibition of Nikhil Chopra's works titled The Afterlife of Performance; a travelling exhibition featuring Benode Behari Mukherjee’s longest ever scroll, his other handscrolls and some murals — Scenes from Santiniketan and Benodebehari’s Handscrolls (2023) — that has travelled to Santiniketan in collaboration with the Santiniketan Society of Visual Art and Design and Durbar Hall at Kochi in collaboration with the Kerala Lalithakala Akademi; Raza Festival celebrating the life and works of S. H. Raza in collaboration with the Raza Foundation; and a 2-year long exhibition, showcased in two phases, titled Freedom and Awakening at the Alipore Jail-turned-Museum. He has also, as part of the Museum exhibition, organised two major art camps involving both prominent and promising artists from the state and beyond. As the HoD of the publishing department at KCC, he has also overseen the publication of several catalogues and other publications of the organisation during this time. Siddharth is also passionate about imparting education to young minds. He has had a short stint as a Business Skills faculty at Tata Consultancy Services, Trivandrum in 2016 and was a visiting faculty at the Performing Arts Department at Presidency University, Kolkata for the even semester in 2022. Siddharth, a creative thinker, has an entrepreneurial streak which led to him becoming the founding editor of Tinpahar, an online publication on art and culture, 14 editions of which he edited between 2012 and 2016. He is also a co-founder of the Yellow Curtain Store and Design Lab (2018–2020).

== See also ==
- Ranjit Hoskote
- Gayatri Sinha
- Nancy Adajania
- R. Siva Kumar
