= Santiniketan: The Making of a Contextual Modernism =

1997 exhibition

- Author: R. Siva Kumar
- Language: English
- Subject: Art
- Publisher: National Gallery of Modern Art
- Publication date: 1997
- Publication place: India
- Pages: 250

Santiniketan: The Making of a Contextual Modernism was an exhibition curated by R. Siva Kumar at the National Gallery of Modern Art in 1997, on the occasion of the 50th anniversary of India's Independence.

The exhibition, through bringing about a hundred works each of four modern Indian artists, namely Nandalal Bose, Rabindranath Tagore, Ram Kinker Baij and Benode Behari Mukherjee on the centre stage, put the Santiniketan art movement into focus.

Kumar argues that the "Santiniketan artists did not believe that to be indigenous one has to be historicist either in theme or in style, and similarly to be modern one has to adopt a particular trans-national formal language or technique. Modernism was to them neither a style nor a form of internationalism. It was critical re-engagement with the foundational aspects of art necessitated by changes in one’s unique historical position".

== Contextual modernism ==
The year 1957 bore witness to two parallel gestures of canon formation. On the one hand, the Baroda Group, a coalition whose original members included Vivan Sundaram, Ghulam Mohammed Sheikh, Bhupen Khakhar, and Nalini Malani—and which had left its mark on history in the form of the 1981 exhibition "Place for People"—was definitively historicized in 1997 with the publication of Contemporary Art in Baroda, an anthology of essays edited by Sheikh. On the other hand, the art historian Kumar’s exhibition and related publication, A Contextual Modernism, focused on the Santiniketan artists Rabindranath Tagore, Nandalal Bose, Benode Behari Mukherjee, and Ramkinkar Baij. Of the Santiniketan artists, Kumar observed that they "reviewed traditional antecedents in relation to the new avenues opened up by cross-cultural contacts. They also saw it as a historical imperative. Cultural insularity, they realized, had to give way to eclecticism and cultural impurity."

According to Kumar "The Santiniketan artists were one of the first who consciously challenged this idea of modernism by opting out of both internationalist modernism and historicist indigenousness and tried to create a context sensitive modernism."

The literary critic Ranjit Hoskote while reviewing the works of contemporary artist Atul Dodiya writes, "The exposure to Santinketan, through a literary detour, opened Dodiya’s eyes to the historical circumstances of what Kumar has called a “contextual modernism” developed in eastern India in the 1930s and ’40s during the turbulent decades of the global Depression, the Gandhian liberation struggle, the Tagorean cultural renaissance and World War II."

== Contextual modernism and the Bengal School of Art ==
Kumar had been studying the work of the Santiniketan masters and thinking about their approach to art since the early 1980s. The practice of subsuming Nandalal Bose, Rabindranath Tagore, Ram Kinker Baij and Benode Behari Mukherjee under the Bengal School of Art was misleading. According to Kumar, "this happened because early writers were guided by genealogies of apprenticeship rather than their styles, worldviews, and perspectives on art practice".

== Santiniketan: art movement and school ==
Kumar draws distinction between Santiniketan the art movement and Santiniketan the School:

I am not sure, however, if everyone noticed the distinction I drew between Santiniketan as an art movement and Santiniketan as a school very clearly. There was both a Santiketan movement and a Santiniketan school, but these are two different things. The movement was shaped by the practices of the masters, chiefly Nandalal, Benodebehari, Ramkinkar and Rabindranath. Their art practices were interrelated but did not stylistically converge. They were linked more by concerns and as participants in a discourse to which each contributed in a different manner. They themselves saw this very clearly but many who wrote about them did not. They either plumped for Nandalal and Benodebehari, or for Ramkinkar and Rabindranath; one pair representing a traditionalist position and the other a modernist position. I am not suggesting that there are no differences between them but that they saw themselves as co-authors of an art scene being essayed around shared issues, complementing each other and expanding their concerns and reach rather than at war with each other.

— All the Shared Experiences of the Lived World

== See also ==
- The Last Harvest: Paintings of Rabindranath Tagore
- Paintings of Abanindranath Tagore
- Rabindra Chitravali
