= Leela Mukherjee =

Indian artist

- Born: Leela Mansukhani; 1916; Hyderabad, Sindh, British Raj
- Died: 2002 (aged 85–86); Delhi, India
- Known for: Sculpture, murals
- Spouse: Benode Behari Mukherjee
- Children: Mrinalini Mukherjee

Leela Mukherjee (1916 – 2002) was an Indian artist; her artwork includes paintings, drawings, sculpture, printmaking and murals. Works by her are in the collection of the National Gallery of Modern Art, New Delhi.

== Early life and education ==
Leela Mukherjee, née Mansukhani, was born in Hyderabad, Sindh in 1916. She attended the Theosophical Girls' School in Benares, and completed a science degree at Bombay University. She then studied art at Kala Bhavan, Santiniketan. Her teachers included Ramkinkar Baij and Nandalal Bose. In 1944 she married a fellow student, Benode Behari Mukherjee.

== Career ==
Mukherjee worked with her husband and the artist Kripal Singh on a mural at Hindi Bhavan, Santiniketan, in 1947.

In 1948 she visited Nepal and learnt wood carving. The critic Pran Nath Mago wrote of her wooden sculpture, "Leela Mukerjee has chiselled in her woodwood sculptures aboriginal human forms with an intense feeling". Later in her working life she started casting in bronze.

From 1954 to 1974 she worked at Welham Girls' School as head of the art department. Two murals by her still exist at the school. She was also head of department at Welham Boys' School.

From 1975, Mukherjee was part of the Lalit Kala Akademi, where she developed her work through printmaking. She also exhibited with the All India Fine Arts and Crafts Society.

Her influences have been described as "Mexican and folk".

Her exhibitions included:

- 1951, at Silpi Chakra in Delhi.
- 1958, a one-woman show of wood-carvings in Delhi.
- 1959, All-India Sculpture Exhibition.
- 1997, Major Trends in Indian Art.

== Personal life ==
Leela and Benode Behari Mukherjee have been described as living in an "enviable milieu of cultural practitioners".

They had one child, a daughter, the artist Mrinalini Mukherjee, born 1949.

== Legacy ==
Mukerjee's art had an influence on the work of her daughter, Mrinalini Mukherjee. Mrinalini spoke of her mother's illness and death changing her creative practice. The critic Holland Cotter noted that Mrinalini "tackled bronze casting, the medium that had been favored by her sculptor-mother".

Pritika Chowdhry has described her as one of the "women artists who rose to national and international prominence in early and middle modernism".

Works by Leela Mukherjee are in the collection of the National Gallery of Modern Art in New Delhi.
