= Kulpreet Singh =

Indian contemporary artist

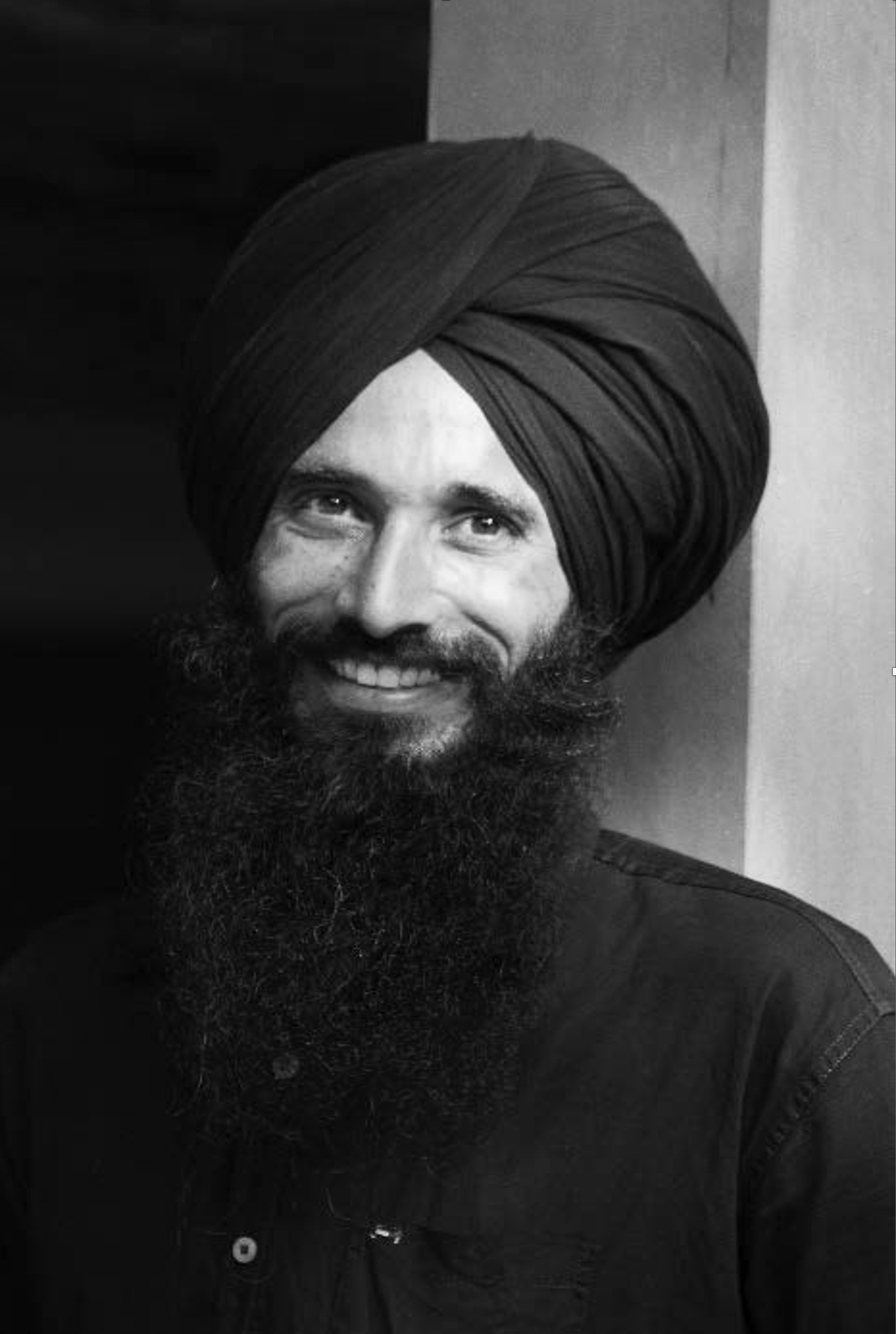
- Kulpreet Singh at PLC SUPVA, Rohtak
- Born: Kulpreet Singh; 11 February 1985 (age 41); Patiala, Punjab, India
- Education: Punjabi University; Fine Arts Department
- Known for: Painting, Installation art, Drawing
- Notable work: Indelible Black Marks; Long Live The Chair

Kulpreet Singh (born 11 February 1985) is a Punjab-based visual artist specializing in drawing, painting, installation, and conceptual art. Kulpreet attended the Punjabi University, did his graduation and masters in fine arts.

His notable works include Indelible Black Marks I (2021) and Indelible Black Marks ll (2021) was inspired by global unrest. In this work, He emphasizes that violence is not a solution and that democracy depends on mutual respect between government agencies and the public. When protests turn violent—marked by stones, sticks, and weapons—lasting scars are left on the delicate fabric of life and human memory, enduring for generations. Singh asks, "Can we choose better? Can we opt for resolutions that do not mar and scar life?" As a thoughtful artist and thinker, he uses his art to provoke new perspectives through a unique and powerful artistic experience. Long live the chair is another notable work by Kulpreet Singh.

== Early life and education ==
Kulpreet studied graduation and master in fine arts from Fine Arts department of Punjabi University. He also joined Jamia Millia Islamia for Bachelors in Fine Arts but dropped in second year of the course.

== Exhibitions ==
- The Horrors of Covid-19" at Studio Pannadwar, Thane, Mumbai, Organized by International Print Exchange Programme, India (2021))
- Indelible Black Marks art film (2020–2021)
- Indelible Black Marks-II art film (2021)
- Contemplation at Punjab Kala Bhawan, Sector 16, Sponsored and Organized by Punjab Lalit Kala Akademi (2019
- Pictorial Expression held at Govt. Museum and Art Gallery Sector 10, Chandigarh (2010)
- "Earth Connection" by Kadamb Art Gallery held at Government Museum and Art Gallery, Chandigarh (2011)

== Awards and honours ==
- Mrinalini Mukherjee Creative arts Grant (MMCAG), 2022–2023
- College Rattan Award by Khalsa College, Patiala 2015.
- Roll Of Honour from Government College, Hoshiarpur 2006-07
- College Colour from Government College, Hoshiarpur 2006-07
- Silver Medal in painting in the “Inter Zonal Youth Festival” held at Punjabi University,
- Patiala by Department of Youth Welfare 2008-2009
- Bronze Medal in Cartooning in the “Inter Zonal Youth Festival” held at Punjabi
- University, Patiala by Department of Youth Welfare 2008-2009
