= The Last Harvest: Paintings of Rabindranath Tagore (book) =

2011 book edited by R. Siva Kumar

- Author: R. Siva Kumar
- Language: English
- Subject: Art
- Publisher: Mapin Publishing
- Publication date: 16 November 2011
- Publication place: India
- Pages: 240
- ISBN: 8189995618

The Last Harvest: Paintings of Rabindranath Tagore is a book on Rabindranath Tagore (1861–1941) and his paintings edited by R. Siva Kumar. In 2011 it was produced in conjunction with the traveling exhibition The Last Harvest: Paintings of Rabindranath Tagore.

== Exhibition ==
The book was produced in conjunction with the traveling exhibition of Rabindranath Tagore's paintings as part of India's National Commemoration of the 150th Birth Anniversary of Rabindranath Tagore, organised by India's Ministry of Culture.

== Contents ==
- Rabindranath Tagore – A Biographical Sketch
- Rabindranath Tagore's Santiniketan – Where Life and Art Meet
- Rabindranath Tagore's First Ever Exhibition in Paris
- Rabindranath Tagore's Paintings in German
- Stella Kramrisch and the Bauhaus in Calcutta
- Tagore's Sense of Rhythm
- Rabindrasangeet – Rabindranath Tagore's Musical Legacy
- Engagement with Modernity – Paintings of Rabindranath Tagore in the National Gallery of Modern Art, Delhi

== Contributors ==
The book was edited by R. Siva Kumar, with contributions by France Bhattacharya, Uma Das Gupta, Martin Kampchen, Lars-Christian Koch, Rajeev Lochan, Kris K. Manjapra, Kathleen O'Connell and William Radice.

== See also ==
- Rabindra Chitravali – a 2011 publication in 4 volumes on Tagore's paintings, edited by R. Siva Kumar
