= Tinpahar =

Indian online magazine

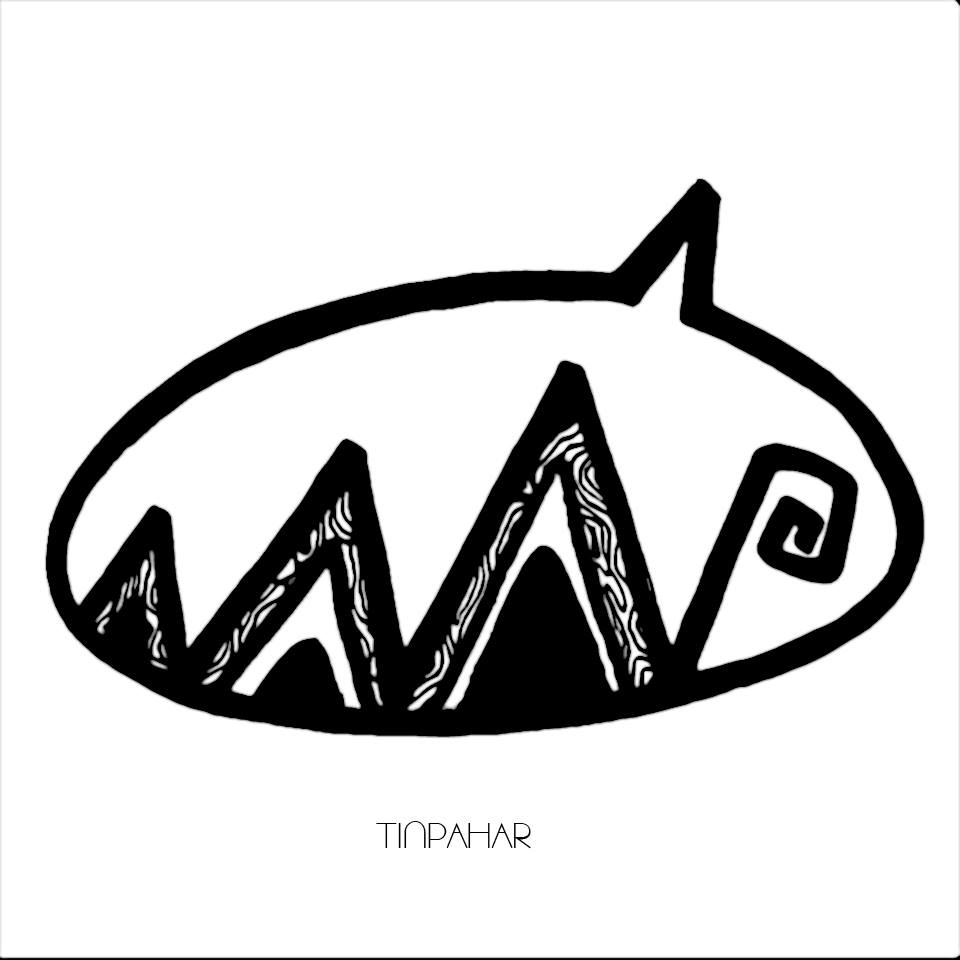
- Editor-in-chief: Siddharth Sivakumar
- Founders: Siddharth Sivakumar, Arkajit Mandal
- Categories: Indian culture
- Frequency: Bimonthly
- First issue: 14 September 2012
- Country: India
- Based in: Santiniketan
- Language: English, Bengali
- Website: tinpahar.com
- ISSN: 2349-6207

Tinpahar is a bimonthly, bilingual (English and Bengali) Indian online magazine that promotes art, literature, and culture with the motto, "Free and Fertile".

== History ==
The magazine was established by Arkajit Mandal and Siddharth Sivakumar. The idea of Tinpahar was developed from Resonance, a magazine edited by Siddharth and published by Patha Bhavana and Visva Bharati. It was launched on 14 September 2012.

== Activity ==
Tinpahar has special columns dedicated to comparative literature, arts, and gender studies in India.

Tinpahar aspires to erase the boundaries between discrete academic disciplines of literature, linguistics, philosophy, sociology, history, anthropology, art history and so on in order to create a "free and fertile" space for constructive discourses on/in humanity. Recently Tinpahar has initiated a programme to support enthusiastic groups engaged in serious cultural endeavours by making them websites for free. The upcoming Tamil website of Tinpahar will act as a platform for students to express themselves on matters of humanities, arts, music, and literature.

In 2014, Tinpahar was the publishing partner of the Poetry Slam hosted by the Literary Society, Presidency University. In 2015 Tinpahar became one of the Online Media Partners of the Festember festival.

== See also ==
- Little magazine movement
- List of literary magazines
