= Sarbari Roy Choudhury =

Indian artist (1933–2012)

Sarbari Roy Chowdhury
- Born: 21 January 1933; Ulpur, British India
- Died: 21 February 2012 (aged 79); Kolkata, West Bengal, India
- Known for: Artist
- Spouse: Ajanta Debi
- Children: Sougata Roychowdhury; Sourav Roychowdhury

Sarbari Roy Chowdhury (21 January 1933 – 21 February 2012), was an Indian artist.

== Biography ==
Chowdhury was born in Ulpur, East Bengal (now Bangladesh) into a Zamindari family, and graduated from the Government College of Art and Craft, Kolkata, in 1956. He later studied under the sculptors Prodosh Dasgupta and Sankho Chaudhuri at the M.S. University, Baroda. Between 1960 and 1962, he served as the Head of the Department of Sculpture at the Indian Art College, Kolkata. He spent most of his professional life at Kala Bhavana, Visva Bharati at Santiniketan. He joined the Kala Bhavana faculty in 1969 and remained there until his retirement in 1997.

Influenced by Indian sculptors like Prodosh Dasgupta as well as Western greats like Rodin, Roy Chowdhury found his inspiration in Hindustani classical music. Roy Chowdhury's figures included a lot of Indian musicians including Bade Ghulam Ali Khan, Allauddin Khan, Ali Akbar Khan, Mallikarjun Mansur, Siddheswari Devi, etc. As he admitted, music was always one of his most significant inspirations, "I feel that the abstraction of music can be expressed only through another abstract art form…Music moves me, and its reaction in my subconscious drives my creative activity…On a very personal level, I seek a visual form of music – visual music or the ‘sculpturliness’ of music. I have tried to achieve that in my work. His works, while pictorial are also largely abstract in their style – perhaps a result of his travels to the Academia de Belle Arti, Florence, in 1962, where he met Giacometti and Henry Moore in person, who along with Sankho Chaudhuri had an undeniable impact on his style. His sculptures feature a unique mix of the academic realism of the East and the more innovative cubism and abstraction of the West.

Roy Chowdhury has won several awards including the Gagan-Abani Puraskar from Visva Bharati University, Santiniketan, in 2004, and the Abanindra Puraskar from the Government of West Bengal in 2005. Over the years he has exhibited his works at several group and solo shows, the latest of which was a retrospective entitled Sensibility Objectified: The Sculptures of Sarbari Roy Choudhury held in May 2009 in New Delhi. A book, Sensibility Objectified: The Sculptures of Sarbari Roy Choudhury, by historian R. Siva Kumar, was also released.

Roy Chowdhury is survived by his wife Ajanta Roy Chowdhury and two sons, Sougata and Sourav. The younger son, Saurav Roy Chowdhury followed his father's path and become a sculptor, while his elder son Sougata Roy Chowdhury is a practitioner of Hindustani classical music and plays Sarod.
