= Ulpur =

Coordinates: 23°04′N 89°50′E

Ulpur is a village to the north of Golpalganj in Bangladesh. It was founded by the Basu Roy Chowdhury of Ulpur family as seat of their Zamindari and Jagir called Shahpur.

Shahpur Pargana consisted of 27 maujas (village plus surrounding greens, farmlands, lakes, etc.) and a population of 30,200 in 1931 with Ulpur being the central village and seat of the Zamindari.

== Notable people ==
- Sarbari Roy Chowdhury, born in 1933 in Ulpur, sculptor
- Subrata Roy Chowdhury, human rights lawyer
