= Benode Behari Mukherjee =

Indian artist (1904–1980)

Benod Behari Mukherjee
- Born: 7 February 1903; Behala, Calcutta, Bengal Presidency, British India
- Died: 11 November 1980 (aged 76); India
- Known for: Painting
- Movement: Contextual Modernism
- Spouse: Leela Mukherjee
- Children: Mrinalini Mukherjee
- Awards: Padma Vibhushan (1974); Rabindra Puraskar (1980)

Benode Behari Mukherjee (7 February 1904 – 11 November 1980) was an Indian artist from West Bengal state. Mukherjee was one of the pioneers of Indian modern art and a key figure of Contextual Modernism. He was one of the earliest artists in modern India to take up to murals as a mode of artistic expression. All his murals depict a subtle understanding of environmental through pioneering architectural nuances.

== Early life ==
Binod Behari Mukherjee was born in Behala, in Kolkata although his ancestral village was Garalgachha in Hooghly District. He taught at Visva Bharati University in Santiniketan. He made his early learning from Sanskrit Collegiate School.

== Career ==
Mukherjee was born with a severe eye problem. Despite being myopic in one eye and blind in the other, he continued to paint and do murals even after he lost his eyesight completely following an unsuccessful eye cataract operation in 1956. In 1919, he took admission in Kala Bhavana, the art faculty of Visva-Bharati University. He was a student of Indian artist Nandalal Bose, and a friend and associate of Ramkinkar Baij, a sculptor. In 1925, he joined Kala Bhava Bijn as a member of the teaching faculty. His notable students included painter Jahar Dasgupta, Ramananda Bandopadhyay, K.G. Subramanyan, Beohar Rammanohar Sinha, sculptor & printmaker Somnath Hore, designer Riten Majumdar and filmmaker Satyajit Ray. In 1949, he left Kala Bhavan and joined as a curator at the Nepal Government Museum in Kathmandu. From 1951 to 1952, he taught at the Banasthali Vidyapith in Rajasthan. In 1952, he along with his wife Leela, started an art training school in Mussoorie. In 1958, he returned to Kala Bhavan, and later became its principal. In 1979, a collection of his Bengali writings, Chitrakar, was published.

In Oxford Art Online, R. Si'va Kumar claims, "His major work is the monumental 1947 mural at the Hindi Bhavan, Sha'ntiniketan, based on the lives of medieval Indian saints and painted without cartoons. With its conceptual breadth and synthesis of elements from Giotto and Tawaraya Sotatsu, as well as from the art of such ancient Indian sites as Ajanta and Mamallapuram, it is among the greatest achievements in contemporary Indian painting."

Mukherjee's wife, Leela Mukherjee, collaborated on some of his work, such as a mural at Hindi Bhavan, Santiniketan, in 1947.

== Style ==
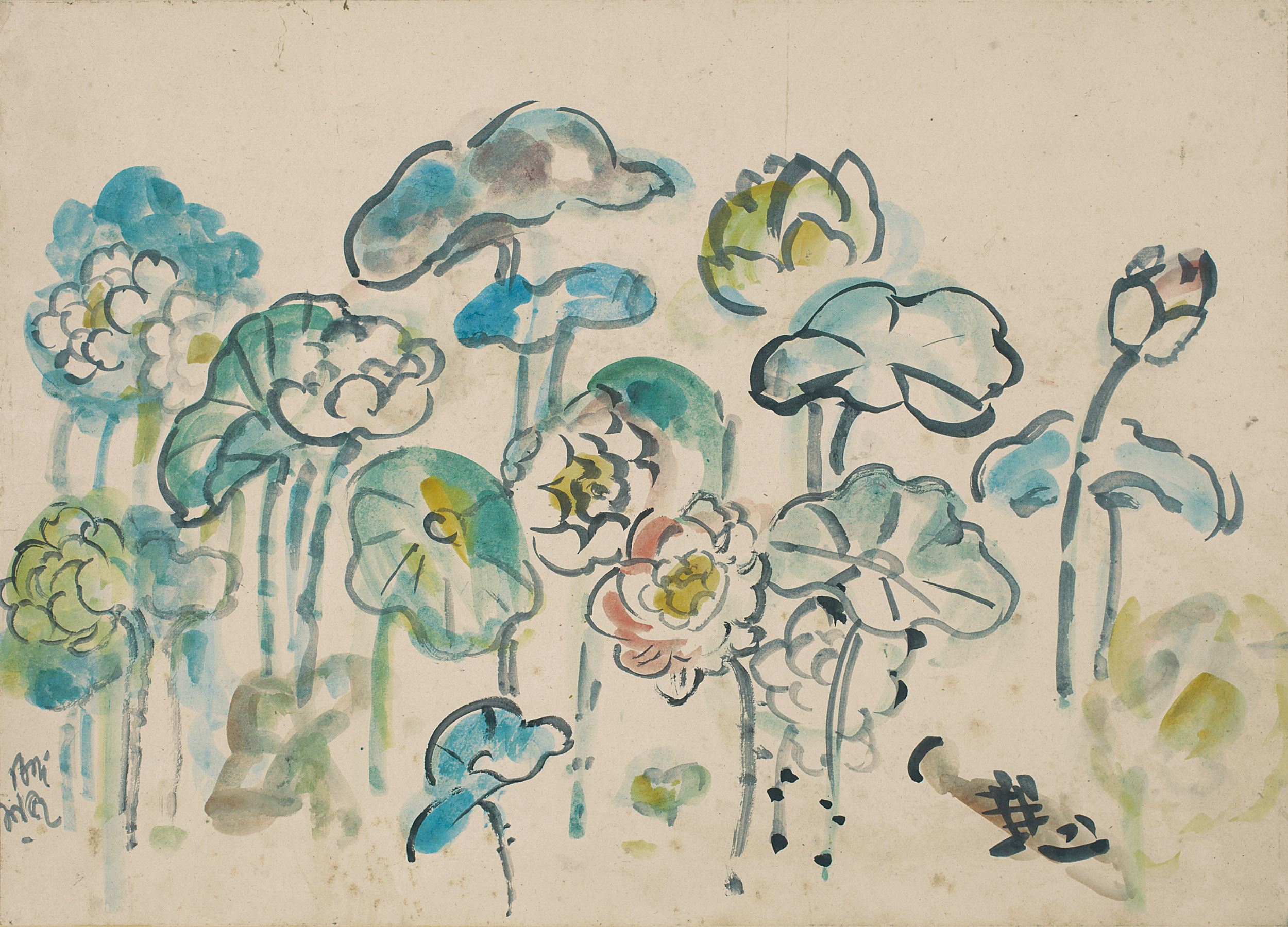
Untitled, 1952, Water color on paper, DAG Museums

His style was a complex fusion of idioms absorbed from Western modern art and the spirituality of oriental traditions (both Indian and Far-Eastern). Some of his works show a marked influence of Far-Eastern traditions, namely calligraphy and traditional wash techniques of China and Japan. He took lessons in calligraphy from travelling artists from Japan. During 1937-38 he spent a few months in Japan with artists such as Arai Kampō. Similarly he also learnt from the Indian miniature paintings in the frescoes of Mughal and Rajput periods. Idioms of Western modern art also bore heavily upon his style, as he is often seen to blend Cubist techniques (such as multi-perspective and faceting of planes) to solve problems of space. He painted grand murals inside the Visva-Bharati campus. In 1948 he went to become director of National Museum of Kathmandu, in Nepal. In the later years he went to Doon valley, where he started an art school but had to discontinue due to the financial shortage.

In 1972 Mukherjee's former student at Santiniketan, filmmaker Satyajit Ray, made a documentary film on him titled "The Inner Eye". The film is an intimate investigation of Mukherjee's creative persona and how he copes with his blindness being a visual artist..

== Awards and honors ==
In 1974, he received the Padma Vibhushan award. He was conferred with the Deshikottama by the Visva Bharati University in 1977. He received the Rabindra Puraskar in 1980.

== Exhibitions ==
- 2013 Manifestations X: 75 Artists 20th Century Indian Art, Dag Modern, New Delhi
- 2014 Manifestation XI - 75 Artists 20th Century Indian Art, Dag Modern, New Delhi
- 2019 Benode Behari Mukherjee: Between Sight and Insight Glimpses, Vadhera Art Gallery, New Delhi
- 2020 Benode Behari Mukherjee: After Sight, David Zwirner, London, Mayfair, London
- 2020 A World Of One's Own, Vadhera Art Gallery, New Delhi
- 2022 Kolkata: Run In The Alley, Marres, House For Contemporary Culture, Maastricht, Netherland

== Personal life ==
In 1944, he married a fellow student, Leela Mukherjee. In 1949, they had their only child, the artist Mrinalini Mukherjee.
