= Santhal Family =

Sculpture by Ramkinkar Baij

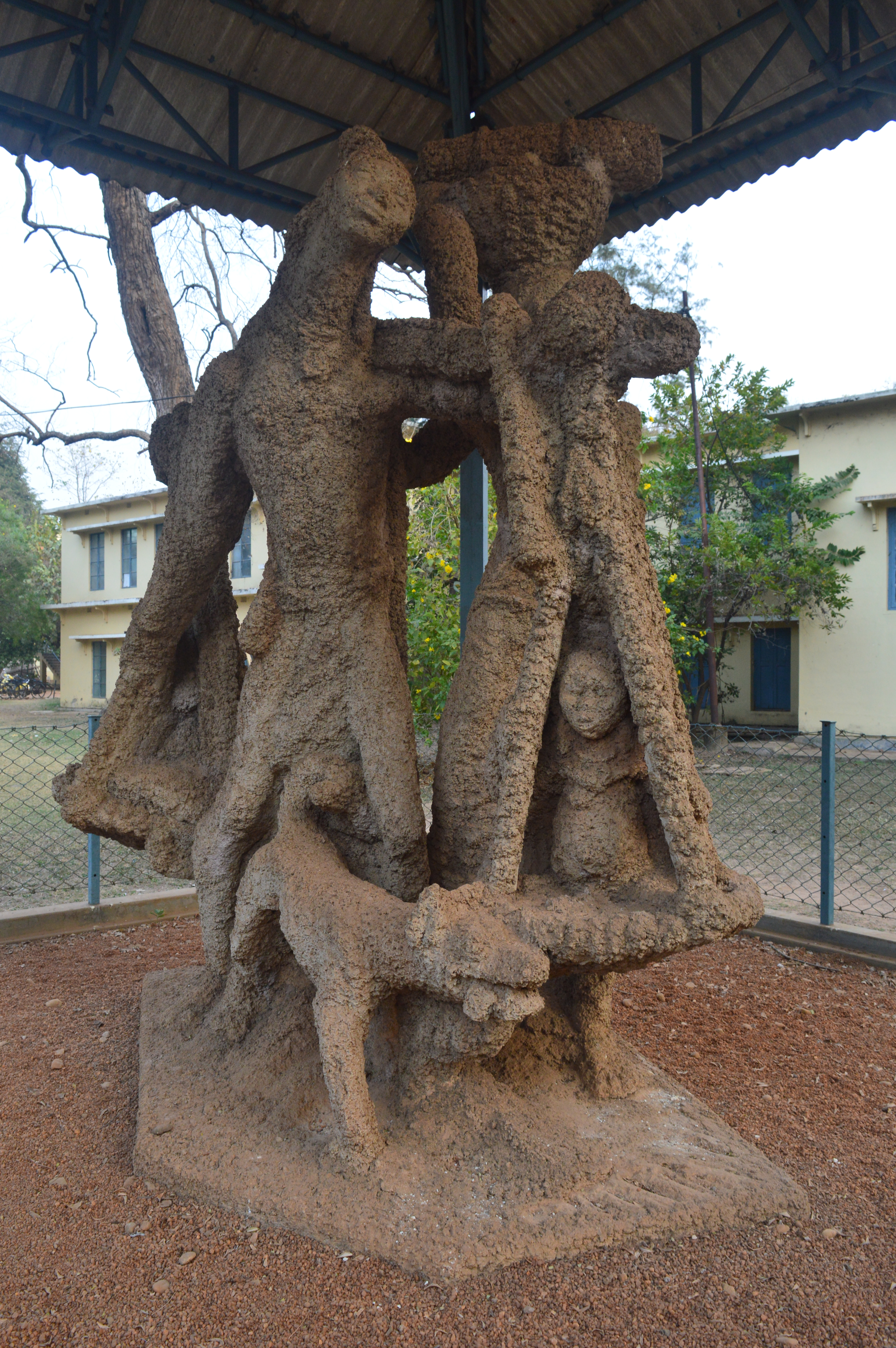
- Artist: Ramkinkar Baij
- Year: 1938
- Medium: Cement, laterite mortar
- Location: Santiniketan, West Bengal
- 23°40′54″N 87°40′58″E

Santhal Family (Bengali: সাঁওতাল পরিবার) is a cement and laterite mortar sculpture by Indian sculptor and painter, Ramkinkar Baij. Often cited as his magnum opus, it is widely considered to be the first public modernist sculpture in India.

== Subject ==
The sculpture depicts a Santhal couple with their child and dog, carrying their possessions with them to settle elsewhere and start a new life. The Santhal people are an Austroasiatic speaking Munda ethnic group in the Indian subcontinent. In India, they are the largest tribe in the states of Jharkhand and West Bengal, and are also found in the states of Odisha, Assam and Bihar.

== Description ==
Santhal Family is a rough outdoor sculpture, made of cement and laterite gravel. The sculpture shows a Santhal father, mother, their child and dog, carrying a couple of possessions with them. Having left their home behind, the family, most likely migrant labourers, is in search of a new destination to settle and start afresh. The figures are earthy and embody humility. Its subject and medium are in line with modernisation, globalization and industrialization, as they symbolise the dynamism and zeitgeist of traditional Bengal at the time of industrialization.

It is currently placed in the compound of Kala Bhavana in Santiniketan. Owing to the unconventional medium, the sculpture is degrading rapidly despite it being roofed.
