= Mrinalini Mukherjee =

Indian sculptor and textile artist (1949–2015)

- Mukherjee with her fibre creations during the preparation for the Fine Arts Fair, 1969
- Born: 1949; Bombay, India
- Died: 15 February 2015 (aged 65); New Delhi, India
- Education: Welham Girls' School; Maharaja Sayajirao University, Vadodara; West Surrey College of Art and Design
- Known for: Sculpture
- Parent(s): Leela Mukherjee; Benode Behari Mukherjee

Mrinalini Mukherjee (1949 – 15 February 2015) was an Indian sculptor. Known for her distinctly contemporary style and use of dyed and woven hemp fibre, an unconventional material for sculpting, she had a career lasting over four decades from the 1970s to the 2000s. Mukherjee's body of work is a part of public collections at, among others, the Museum of Modern Art, Oxford; the National Gallery of Modern Art, New Delhi; Tate Modern, London; The Metropolitan Museum of Art, New York; and the Stedelijk Museum, Amsterdam. The artist's personal archive is digitised and freely accessible on Asia Art Archive's website.

== Early life and education ==
Mukherjee was born in 1949, in Mumbai, India to artists Benode Behari Mukherjee and Leela Mukherjee. The only child of her parents, she was brought up in the hill town of Dehradun (in present Uttarakhand), where she attended Welham Girls' School, and spent her summer vacations in Santiniketan.

Mukherjee went to study Bachelor of Fine Arts (Painting) at Maharaja Sayajirao University of Baroda. Thereafter, she did a Post Diploma in Mural Design from the same university under the Indian artist K.G. Subramanyan who was also a member of the Fine Arts Faculty at the university. Her studies included working Italian Fresco and other conventional techniques. She worked with natural fibres as a medium for murals.

== Career ==
In the 1960s and 1970s Mukherjee used local hemp and jute to create knotted designs outside the macrame designs popular at the time. Her first solo exhibition was held at Sridharani Art Gallery in New Delhi in 1972. It featured warped, woven forms in dyed natural fibres—a series of works that brought her recognition. She named her sculptures after deities of fertility and were seen as sensual and suggestive. Mukherjee received a British Council Scholarship for Sculpture in 1971.

While most of Mukherjee's early work was characterised by the use of natural hemp fibre, she also used ceramic and bronze later in her career. Her bronze work emerged in the 2000s, "when the artist began casting forms moulded directly in wax using the traditional lost-wax process, whose surfaces she finished with tools obtained from a local dentist".

Mukherjee was invited to the Museum of Modern Art, Oxford to participate in an exhibition curated by David Elliott in 1994. The same exhibition further travelled to other cities in the United Kingdom over the course of the next few months. Mukherjee later participated in an international workshop that was held Netherlands in 1996. Around this time she started to experiment with ceramics.

In 2019, the Metropolitan Museum of Art hosted a posthumous retrospective of Mukherjee's work called "Phenomenal Nature: Mrinalini Mukherjee". In her review of the exhibition, art critic Nageen Shaikh observes: "Perhaps the principal lesson that historians, critics, and viewers acquire with an astounding retrospective like Mukherjee's is how art can resist being viewed as delineated under a methodical Western canon. Her massive oeuvre is not fully representational, neither completely abstract. It learns from her native history and tradition, while educating us in new ways to engage with subtleties of her work."

== Technique and style ==
Mukherjee was influenced by traditional Indian and historic European sculpture, folk art, modern design, local crafts and textiles. Knotting was one of her main techniques; she worked intuitively and never worked based on sketches, models or preparatory drawings.

The authors of Indian Contemporary Art Post-Independence dubbed Mukherjee as a "unique voice in contemporary Indian art", and remarked "The sculptures knotted painstakingly with hemp ropes in earthy or rich glowing colours evoke a fecund world of burgeoning life, lush vegetation, iconic figures." Acknowledging the note of sexuality manifested in the "phallic forms", they added "the mysterious folds and orifices, the intricate curves and drapes. There is a sensuous, tactile quality to her work which exercises a compelling hold on the viewer."

Mukherjee studied under K. G. Subramanyan, and derived heavily from his artistry. Sonal Khullar writing on Subramanyan's influence on her wrote in Worldly Affiliations Mukherjee a former student, "[...] use jute, wood, rope, and cow dung to create environments at once magical and mundane. Their inventiveness with visual language and investments in ordinary materials are a legacy of Subramanyan's teaching, writing and art-making."

Art historian and independent curator Deepak Ananth also ascribed Mukherjee's predilection for modest, earthly materials to her influence from Subramanyan, and in turn from the history of Indian artisanal craft. In an essay entitled "The Knots are Many But the Thread is One", Ananth wrote, "As if in harmony with the vegetable realm from which her medium is derived, the leading metaphor of Mukherjee's work comes from the organic life of plants. Improvising upon a motif or image that serves as her starting point the work's gradual unfolding itself becomes analogous to the stirring into maturation of a sapling."

== Influences ==
In the context of the pedagogy professed by K G Subramanyan, Mukherjee's decision to work in a material traditionally associated with her craft rather than "high art" reflects her teacher's conscious attempts to overcome what they considered to be a staple polarity in Modernism, not least in view of the extreme richness and continuing actuality of traditional artisanal skills in India and the sheer versatility of popular vernacular idioms.

== Death ==
Mrinalini Mukherjee was hospitalized before her 2015 retrospective exhibition at the National Gallery of Modern Art in New Delhi. She died a week later, at the age of 65.

== Public collections ==
- Modern Art Oxford, Oxford
- Yorkshire Sculpture Park, Yorkshire
- Stedelijk Museum, Amsterdam
- National Gallery of Modern Art, New Delhi
- Lalit Kala Akademi, New Delhi
- Roopankar Museum of Art, Bharat Bhawan, Bhopal
- Fine Arts Museum, Panjab University, Chandigarh
- India Tourism Development Corporation, New Delhi
- India Institute of Immunology, New Delhi
- Tate Modern, London
- Government Museum and Art Gallery, Chandigarh
- Museum of Modern Art, New York
- The Metropolitan Museum of Art, New York

== Bibliography ==
- Dalmia, Yashodharea; Datta, Ella; Sambrini, Chaitnya; Jakimowicz, Martha; Datta, Santo (1997). Indian Contemporary Art Post-Independence (English). New Delhi: Ajanta Offset Ltd.
- Jhaveri, Shanay, ed. (2019). Mrinalini Mukherjee. Mumbai: Shoestring. ISBN 9788190472098.
- Khullar, Sonal (2015). Worldly Affiliations: Artistic Practice, National Identity, and Modernism in India, 1930-1990. California: University of California Press.
