= The Last Harvest: Paintings of Rabindranath Tagore =

2011 exhibition of Rabindranath Tagore's paintings

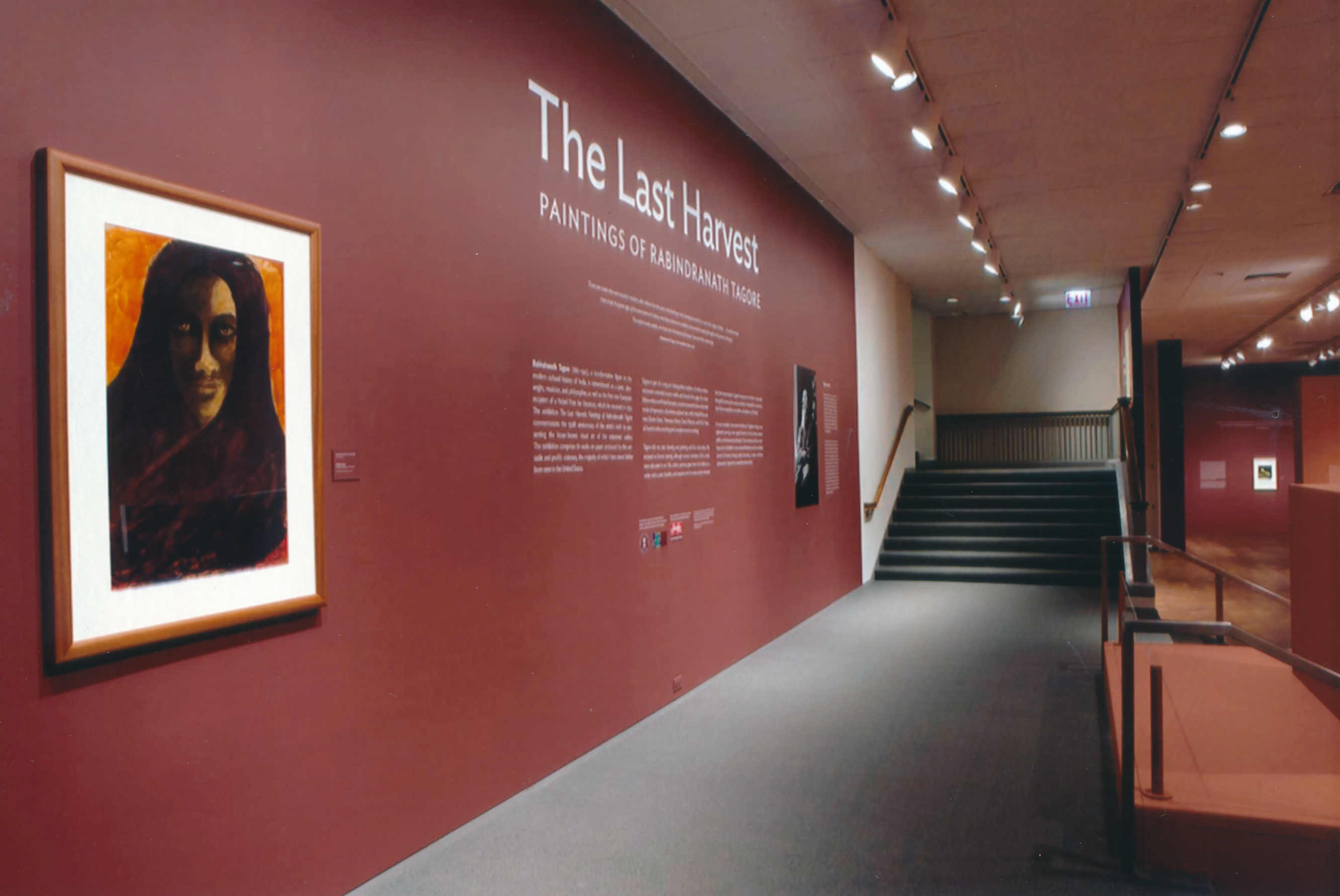
The Last Harvest - Paintings of Rabindranath Tagore

The Last Harvest was an exhibition of Rabindranath Tagore's paintings to mark the 150th anniversary of Tagore's birth. It was commissioned by the Ministry of Culture, India and organised with the National Gallery of Modern Art (NGMA). It consisted of 208 paintings drawn from the collections of Visva Bharati and the NGMA. The exhibition was curated by art historian R. Siva Kumar. Asia Art Archive later classified the exhibition as a "world event".

Within the 150th birth anniversary year it was conceived as three separate but similar exhibitions, and travelled simultaneously in three circuits. The first selection was shown at Museum of Asian Art, Berlin, Asia Society, New York, National Museum of Korea, Seoul, Victoria and Albert Museum, London, The Art Institute of Chicago, Chicago, Petit Palais, Paris, Galleria Nazionale d'Arte Moderna, Rome, National Visual Arts Gallery (Malaysia), Kuala Lumpur, McMichael Canadian Art Collection, Ontario, National Gallery of Modern Art, New Delhi, National Gallery of Modern Art, Mumbai.

An illustrated catalogue, titled The Last Harvest: Paintings of Rabindranath Tagore, with essays by international Tagore experts was published to accompany the exhibition. The book covered Tagore's art and other aspects of his work and life.

== The International tour of Rabindranath Tagore's Paintings ==
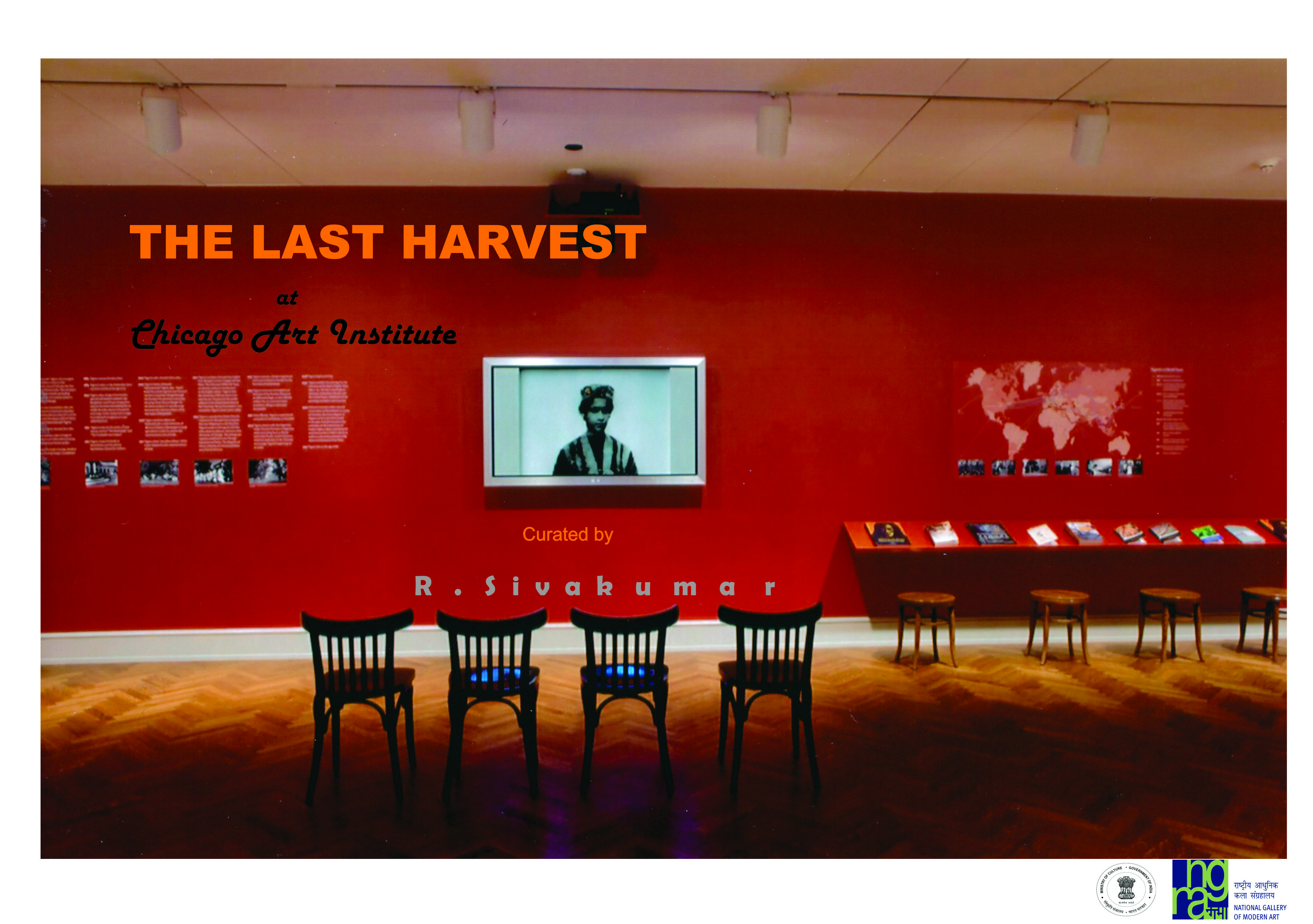
Last Harvest in Chicago

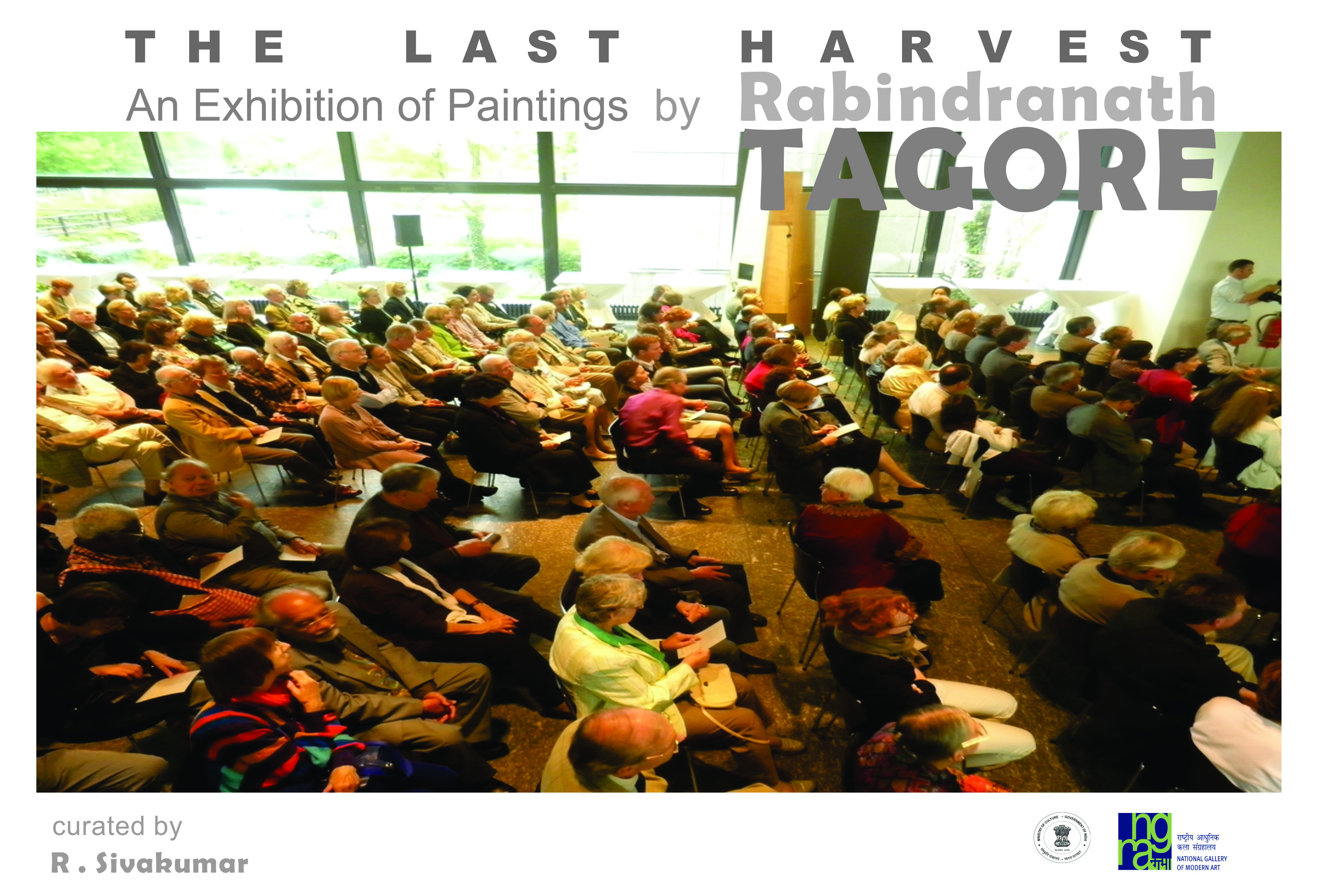
The Last Harvest at Berlin

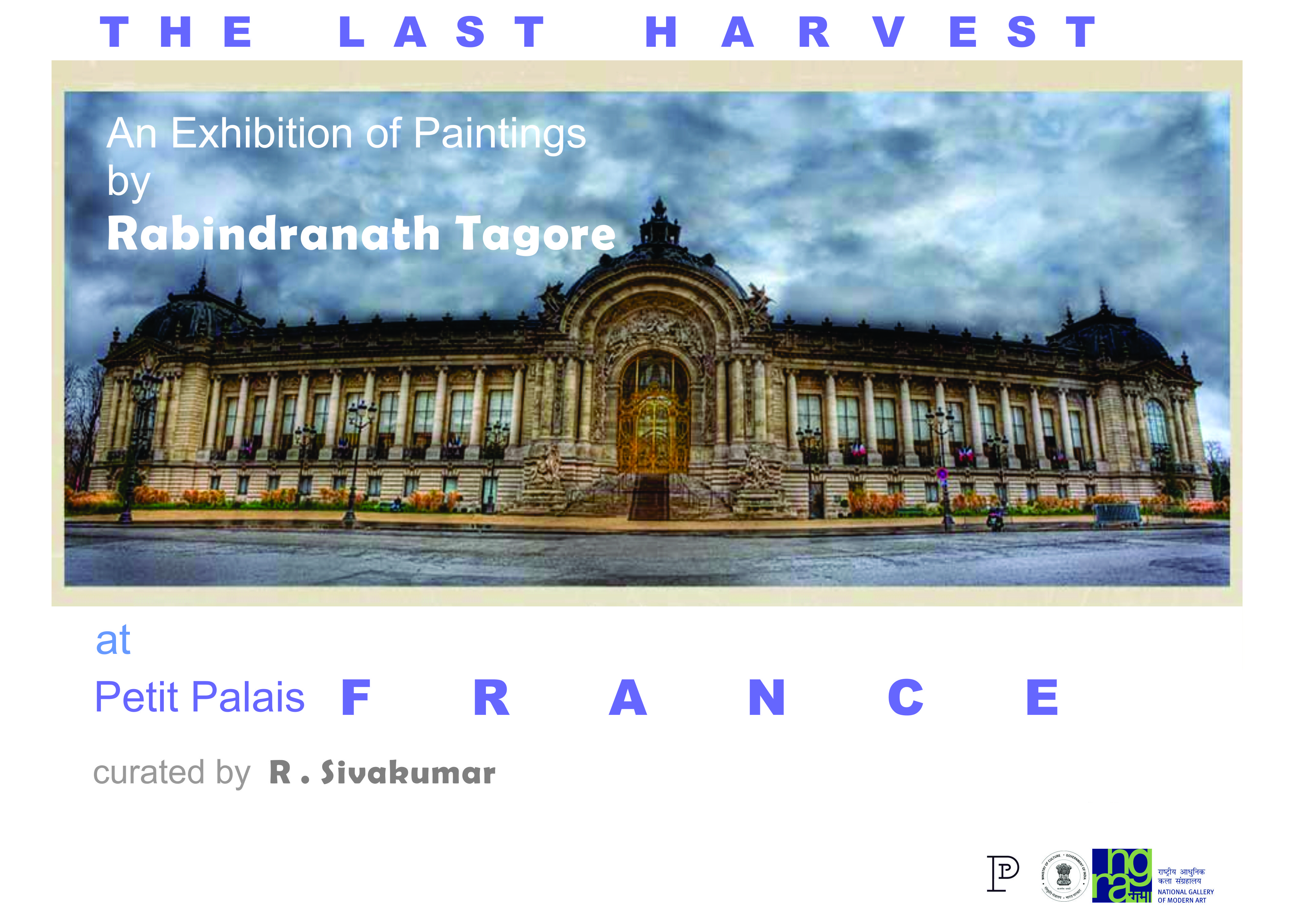
The Last Harvest at Petit palais

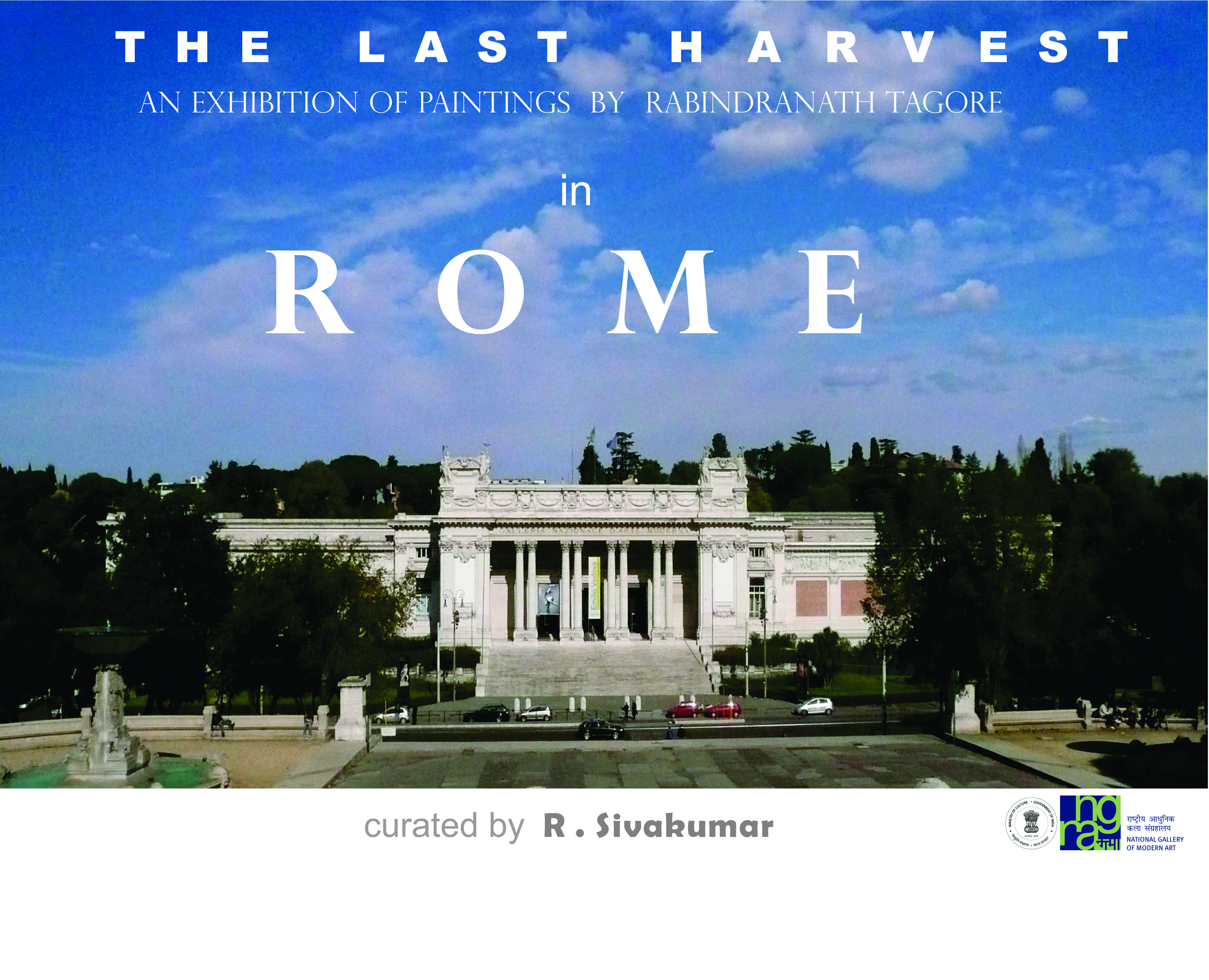
The Last Harvest in Rome

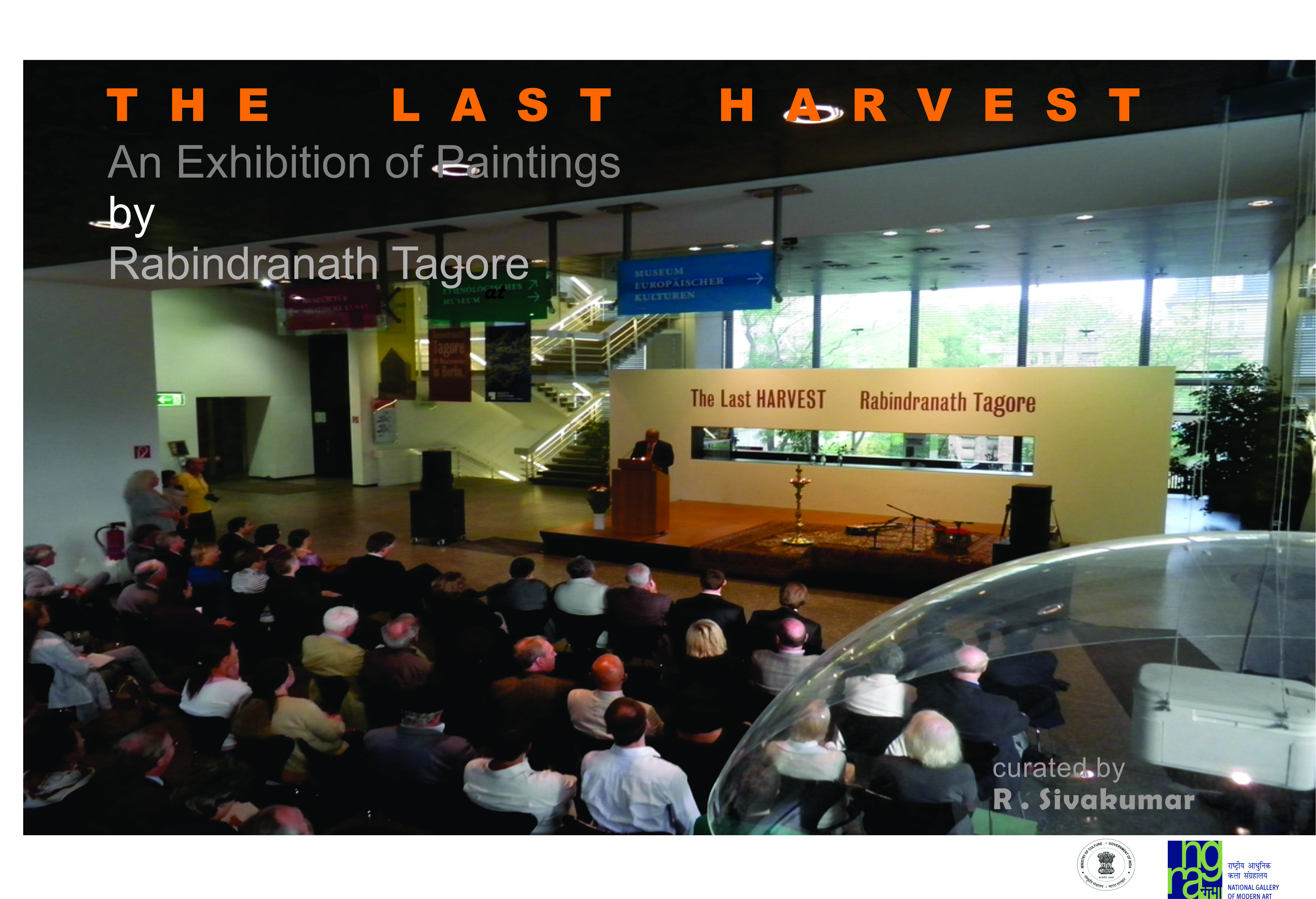
Last Harvest in Berlin

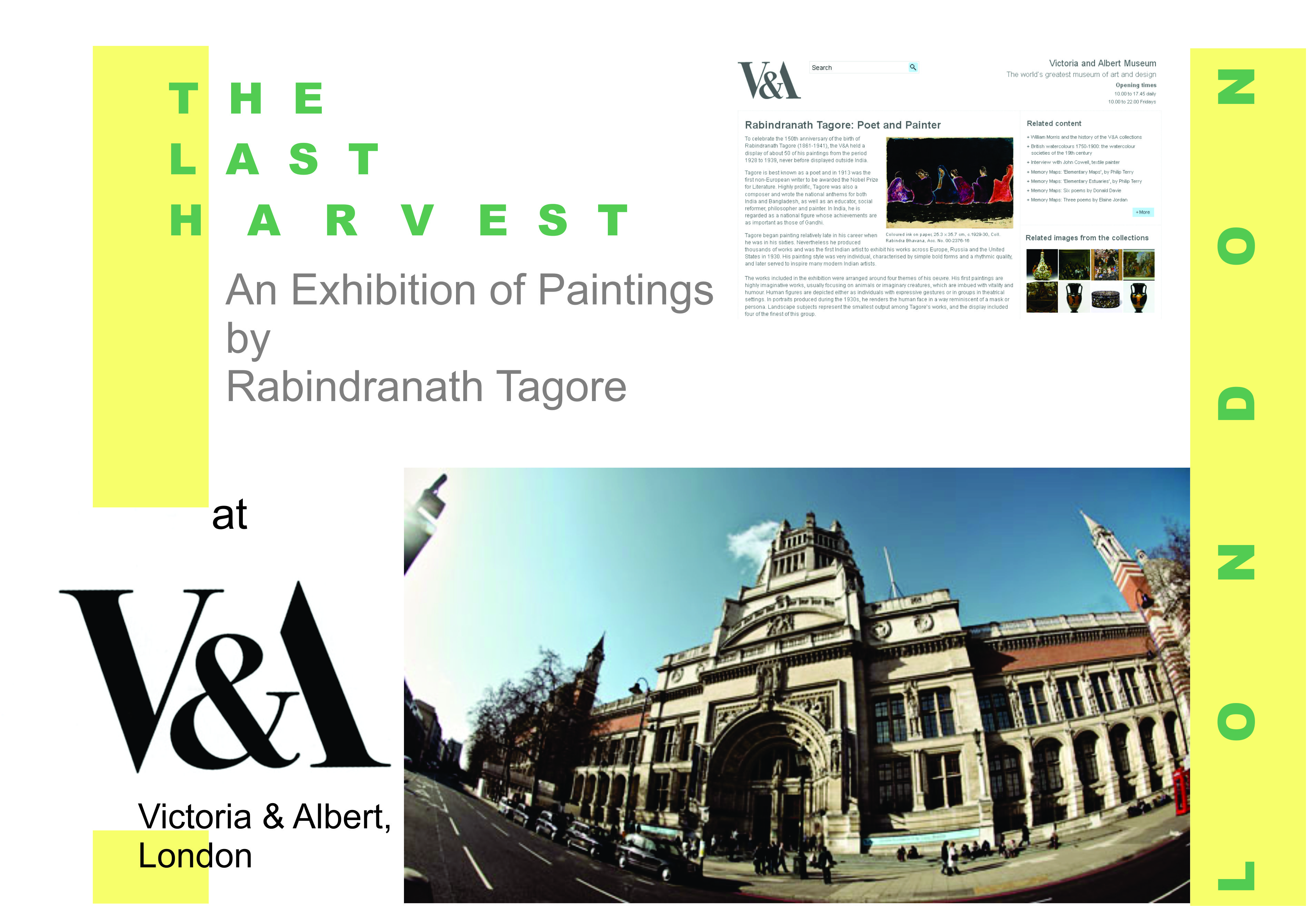
Last Harvest at V&A

== Reception ==
The Last Harvest received highly appreciable reviews across the globe. The British newspaper Daily Telegraph reported,"Tagore is such a fascinating figure that for the fans of his work the art will illuminate his poems and fictions; and for those coming cold, this (The Last Harvest) serves as a delightful introduction." The Independent rated the exhibition as one of the five best shows to have opened in London in 2011. Mumbai Boss declared it the best museum exhibition saying, "At this gathering of about 100 works, one of the largest since his death, fluidly curated by historian R. Siva Kumar, the viewer was given a peek into a less assured Tagore, as a 60-something artist, who used his innate sense of linguistic artistry to permeate his at-times fantastical works. There were animals invented, idyllic landscapes, portraits and drawings that showed him to have an astonishing grasp of what it meant to endow a visual expression with the same raw beauty as its written equivalent." Daily News and Analysis reported, "Tagore's imagination created paintings that underline his sheer genius. Yet, they were untitled, left to viewers to interpret." According to The Times of India, The Last Harvest was "A rare display of artworks by Tagore". "Like a skipping stone, Tagore’s style glanced off a variety of inspirations – wood-cuts, surrealist imagery, North American folk art – and yet was sharply distinctive. The Last Harvest, curated by Professor Raman Siva Kumar of Visva-Bharati University, presents one of the most elaborate exhibitions of Tagore’s paintings that we’ve seen." reported Firstpost.

== See also ==
- Rabindra Chitravali
- Kala Bhavana
