= Rabindra Chitravali =

2011 book series containing paintings of Rabindranth Tagore

- 4 covers and catalog
- Author: R. Siva Kumar
- Language: English
- Subject: Rabindranath Tagore's Paintings and Philosophy of Art
- Genre: Art
- Publisher: Pratikshan
- Publication date: 2011
- Publication place: India
- Pages: 1600+
- ISBN: 978-81-89323-30-1

Rabindra Chitravali is a 2011 four-volume set of books by art historian R. Siva Kumar that contains paintings of Rabindranth Tagore. These include about 1700 paintings in the Rabindra Bhavana and Kala Bhavana collections of Visva-Bharati, Santiniketan; and more than 300 paintings in the collection of the National Gallery of Modern Art and the collections at Rabindra Bharati University, Kolkata; National Gallery of Modern Art, New Delhi and Bangalore; and Indian Museum, Kolkata.

== Significance ==
R. Siva Kumar said that reproducing the works in print was important in making them accessible to the public, as "The ink used in the originals is not very durable. The paintings can't be left in the open for long".

In a review for the Royal Asiatic Society, Cambridge Journals, W. Andrew Robinson called the reproductions of "unparalleled quality" and said the four volumes cover almost all of Tagore's existing work, though some works are missing.

== See also ==
- The Last Harvest: Paintings of Rabindranath Tagore
- Santiniketan: The Making of a Contextual Modernism
