= Ramkinkar Baij =

Indian sculptor and painter (1906–1980)

Ramkinkar Baij রামকিঙ্কর বেইজ
- Born: 25 May 1906; Jugipara, Bankura Town, Bankura District, Bengal, British India (present-day West Bengal, India)
- Died: 2 August 1980 (aged 74); IPGMER and SSKM Hospital, Calcutta, West Bengal, India
- Known for: Sculptor, painter
- Notable work: Lady with Dog, Sujata, Santhal Family, Mill Call, Yaksha-Yakshi (Jokkho-Jokkhi)
- Movement: Contextual Modernism
- Relatives: Dibakar Baij (nephew); Shiba Prasad Baij (great-nephew)
- Awards: Padma Bhushan (1970)
- Patrons: Ramananda Chatterjee

Ramkinkar Baij (Bengali: রামকিঙ্কর বেইজ) (25 May 1906 – 2 August 1980) was an Indian sculptor and painter, one of the pioneers of modern Indian sculpture and a key figure of Contextual Modernism.

== Early life and career ==
Baij was born in an economically modest family in the Bankura district of the modern state of West Bengal in India. His known relatives include his nephew Dibakar Baij and great-nephew Shibaprasad Baij. Ramkinkar Baij was cremated by Dibakar at Santiniketan, and had named him one of his legal heirs. However, many of his artistic creations have been inspired by the lifestyles of rural dalit or Adivasi (Santhal) communities living in and around his place of work Santiniketan.

While in his mid-teens Ramkinkar used to paint portraits of Indian freedom fighters involved in the Non-Cooperation Movement against the British rulers of India. At the age of 16 he was noticed by the renowned journalist Ramananda Chatterjee. Four years later Ramkinkar joined the Visva-Bharati University at Santiniketan as a student of fine arts. After obtaining a diploma from the university he went on to head the sculpture department. Ramkinkar's renowned sculptor disciples include Prabhas Sen, Shankho Chowdhury, Avtar Singh Panwar, Madan Bhatnagar, Dharmani, Balbir Singh Katt, Rajul Dharial, Susan Ghose, and Kiron Sinha.

== Life and work ==
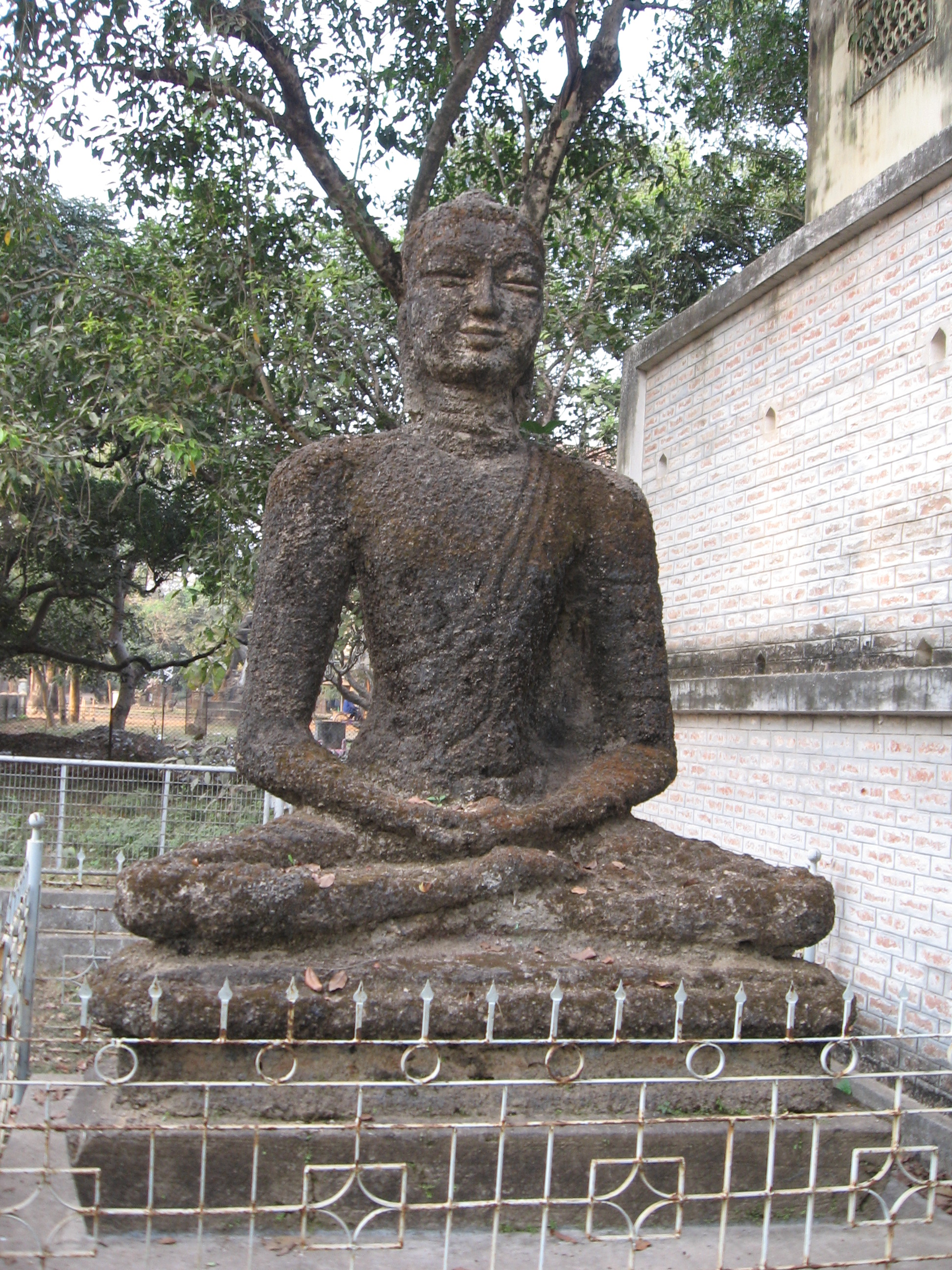
A statue of Buddha by Ram Kinker Baij at Shantiniketan campus.

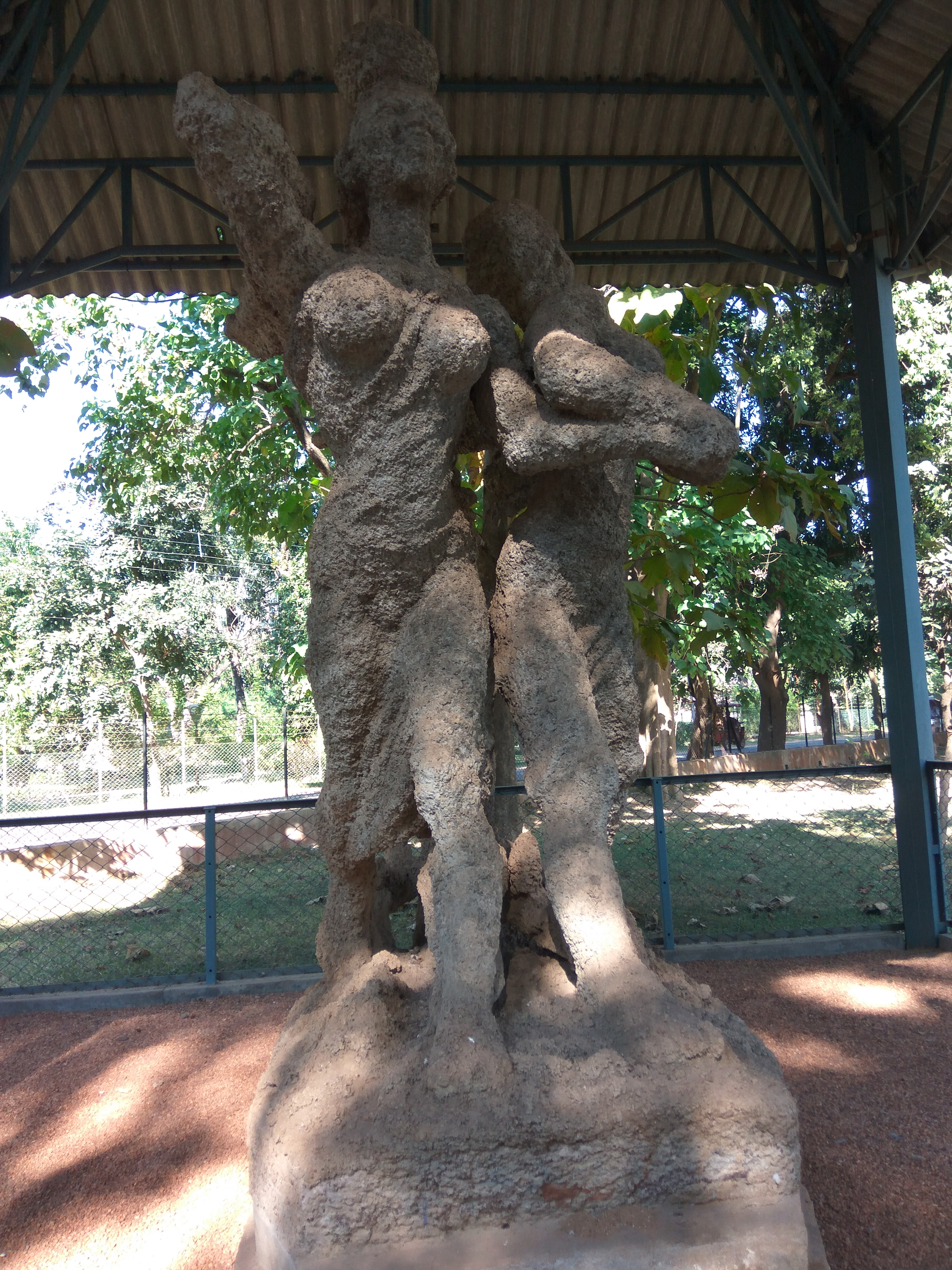

Professor R. Siva Kumar, an authority of the Santiniketan School of Art wrote, "Ramkinkar Baij was born on 25 May 1906 in Bankura in West Bengal, into a family of little economic and social standing, and grew, by the sheer dint of talent and determination, into one of the most distinguished early modernists in Indian art. As a young boy, he grew up watching local craftsmen and image-makers at work; and making small clay figures and paintings with whatever came his way. His talent, prodigious for his age, attracted the attention of local people, especially of the nationalists with whom he was associated. This led him in 1925, on the advice of Ramananda Chatterjee the nationalist publisher and apologist for the new Indian art movement, to mark his way to Kala Bhavana, the art school at Santiniketan. At Santiniketan, under the guidance of Nandalal Bose and encouraged by its liberating intellectual environment, shaped by Rabindranath Tagore, his artistic skills and intellectual horizons acquired new depth and complexity. Soon after completing his studies at Kala Bhavana he became a member of its faculty, and along with Nandalal and Benode Behari Mukherjee played a decisive role in making Santiniketan the most important centre for modern art in pre-Independence India.

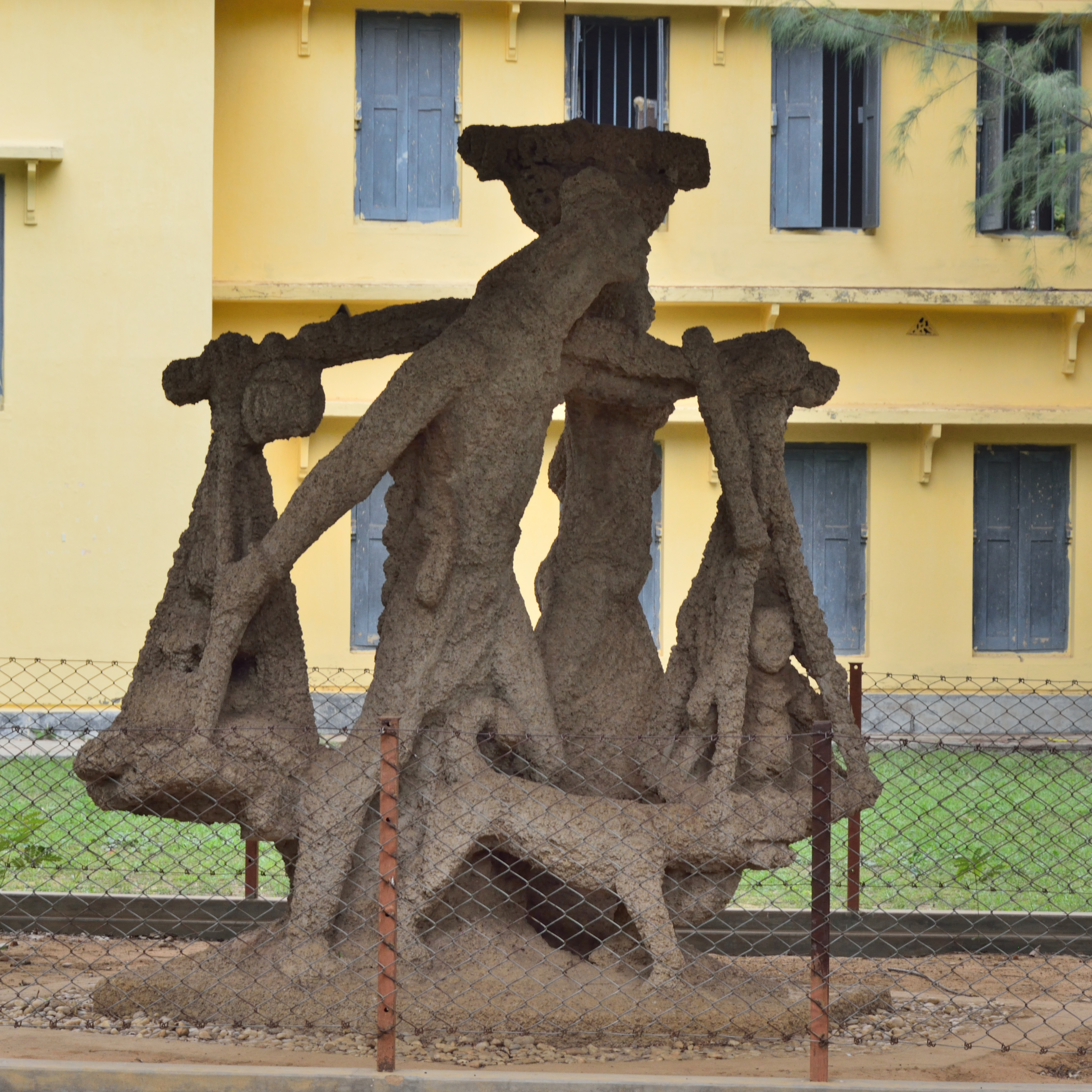
The Santal Family made in 1938, Santiniketan.

Santiniketan was conceived as a locus for artistic experimentation and resurgence rather than as a mere centre for imparting training and knowledge. This allowed talented individuals to add social dimension and give public expression to their personal vision. Ramkinkar used this opportunity to make monumental public sculpture, undertaken entirely at his own initiative. Beginning in early thirties he began to fill the campus with sculptures, one after the other, which were innovative in subject matter and personal in style. His first magnum opus in this genre was the Santal Family done in 1938. In this larger than life sculpture he represented the tribal peasants of the region, giving the figures iconic presence and dignified grace that was so far limited to the images of Gods and Rulers. In a country where all public art-work was undertaken only at the behest of Government commissioning and executed in consonance with the taste of conservative ruling elites, this was a radical departure. The use of cement and laterite mortar to model the figures, and the use of a personal style in which modern western and Indian pre-classical sculptural values were brought together was equally radical. With this seminal work Ramkinkar established himself as undoubted modern Indian sculptor.

Ramkinkar was singularly reticent and otherworldly as he was single-minded in his commitment to art and humanity. But this did not stop his work from being noticed and appreciated by sensitive artists and connoisseurs, even if it were to remain a small group. Although his work was passed over for quite a while, gradually it began to get both national and international attention. He was invited to participate in the Salon des Salon des Réalités Nouvelles in 1950 and in the Salon de Mai 1951. And in the seventies national honours began to come his way one after the other. In 1970 the Government of India honoured him with the Padma Bhushan, in 1976 he was made a fellow of the Lalit Kala Akademi, in 1976 he was conferred the Desikottama by Visva Bharati, and in 1979 an honorary D.Litt. by the Rabindra Bharati University.

=== Yaksha-Yakshi at Reserve Bank of India ===
Figure of Yakshi by Ramkinkar Baij at Reserve Bank of India depicting the idea of 'prosperity through agriculture'.

In the early independent India, Pandit Jawaharlal Nehru, the Prime Minister, suggested that public buildings, many of which were large imposing structures, could be utilized to ‘encourage Indian artists to function in 'some way’ and sculptors, painters, designers, etc. could be asked to cooperate. He made a committee to perform the selection of artists.

Amongst other schemes, the Committee recommended that sculptures could be erected on either side of the main entrance of the RBI office at New Delhi, one depicting the idea of "prosperity through industry" and the other "prosperity through agriculture". At the instance of J.R.D.Tata, the then Director of the Central Board, the views of Carl Khandalawalla were sought. Carl suggested that the Bank could consider having figures of "Yaksha" and "Yakshini" on the two sides. On his advice, the invitation to tender for the adornment of the frontage of the New Delhi Office was extended to the nine artists.

Out of the nine artists invited, five submitted their proposals and amongst them only one submitted models and sketches. The proposal of Shri Ram Kinkar Baij was accepted. The art form of the male ‘Yaksha’ was drawn from the statue of the ‘Parkham Yaksha’ in the Mathura Museum and Yakshini was derived from “Bisnagar Yakshini” from the Calcutta Museum.

‘That must have been 1954. I don’t remember it correctly. I received a letter to send a model for a sculpture to be placed at the Reserve Bank. Off I sent a three-foot maquette.’‘The first task was to search for the stone. I went out searching. We found it in Kangra valley’s Baijnath, on the way to Kullu. Sandstone – Shivalik sandstone. Quite to my liking.’ -Baij

Somendranath Bandyopadhyay's book 'My days with Ramkinkar Baij' (translated into English by Bhaswati Ghosh) mentions the above and the following quotes:

‘You might have noticed that I’ve placed a discus in my sculpture’s hand. That was my idea. Addition. It’s a modern-day machine and is symbolic of industry. I got the idea for the flower and paddy cluster in Yakshi’s hand from the old statues. You know what Yaksha held in the ancient statues? A mallet. And a bag in the left hand. I have placed that too. Money bag. My Yaksha is completely modern – with a machine and a money bag. And is it possible to have the money bag and not have a fat belly? Yakshas do have protruding bellies, my dear. You must have seen ancient Yaksha statues. My Yaksha has it too.’ -Baij

== Controversy ==
A bronze bust of Rabindranath Tagore made by Baij was placed in 1984 at an outdoor monument in Balatonfüred, Hungary, on a promenade named for Tagore alongside Lake Balaton. Tagore had received cardiac treatment at the (Szívkórház) at Balatonfüred in 1926.

The National Gallery of Modern Art (NGMA) in New Delhi has the original concrete casting of the bust, from which the bronze bust was prepared, and dates the original to 1940, one year before Tagore's death. Apparently Tagore did not die "right after" the bust was completed.

When West Bengal Culture Minister Jatin Chakraborty unveiled Ramkinkar's bust of Tagore in Hungary, he had remarked that it did not "look" like Tagore, and should probably be replaced. When people like Satyajit Ray swiftly responded, the matter was laid to rest".

A differing view holds that many prominent persons including Maitreyi Devi (poet and novelist) supported Chakraborty, and that later the effort to replace the bust was cancelled by then cultural minister Buddhadeb Bhattacharjee.

The once controversial bust has been replicated by the Indian government and given by it to a number of foreign countries including Colombia, Finland and Israel.

Some time between 2003 and 2009, the outdoor sculpture at Balatonfüred was replaced with a different appearing bust of Tagore, and the original bust by Baij was moved to room 220 of the State Hospital for Cardiology in Balatonfüred, which is the same room where Rabindranath Tagore had stayed in 1926.

== Legacy ==
Ritwik Ghatak wisely made a documentary on Baij named 'Ramkinkar' (1975) where he featured him as a political icon. The secret behind this fearless observation of this "Padma Bhushan" winning artist is disclosed by himself in the documentary by Ghatak. A Calcutta publisher, Monfakira has an English book on ramkinkar, 'self-portrait', translated from Bengali by Sudipto Chakraborty of Ranchi. In 2012 the Sculptor K.S. Radhakrishnan curated a grand retrospective Of Ramkinkar's at the National Gallery of Modern Art, Delhi. A scholarly book on the artist, Ramkinkar Baij (book), by the eminent Art Historian professor R. Siva Kumar was launched at this event. The book is believed to be the most comprehensive one on Ramkinkar Baij. In 2013 R. Siva Kumar was awarded by the Paschimbanga Bangla Akademi for this book. 24 January 2013 the first Ramkinkar Baij Memorial Lecture was delivered by one of Ramkinkar favorite students, the eminent artist K. G. Subramanyan.

== In media ==
Ramkinkar Baij (1975) is an incomplete personality study or documentary by Ritwik Ghatak. The film remained unfinished due to the death of Ritwik Ghatak.

Samaresh Basu's unfinished novel Dekhi Nai Phire (I did not look back), cut short by the author's death, is also a classic piece based on Ramkinkar's life.

Asur (2020), a Bengali movie starring Jeet, Abir Chatterjee and Nusrat Jahan directed by Pavel, is a small tribute to him.
