= Mini Sivakumar =

Indian artist

- Born: 1961; Trivandrum, Kerala, India
- Died: 5 September 2010
- Education: University of Kerala
- Occupation: Artist
- Spouse: R. Siva Kumar

Mini Sivakumar was an Indian visual artist.

== Early life and education ==
Mini Sivakumar was born in Trivandrum in 1962 and took her post-graduation in Zoology. She then pursued her post-doctoral research at Visva Bharati University. She was married to the eminent art historian, R. Siva Kumar.

== Career ==
In 2001 she took art as a profession and had conducted different national and international shows. In the year 2008, she conducted a major solo show at Birla Akademy, Mumbai.

She is known for her "vibrancy of color and the dynamism of a creative outpouring"

== Cancer and death ==
Mini died of breast cancer on 5 September 2010.
