= R. Siva Kumar =

Contemporary Indian art historian art-critic and curator (born 1956)

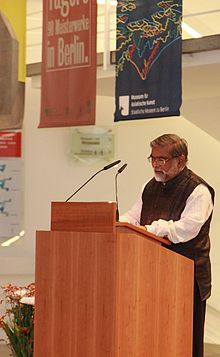
- Siva Kumar lecturing at the opening of The Last Harvest : Paintings of Rabindranath Tagore, Museum of Asian Art, Berlin (2012).
- Born: 3 December 1956 (age 69); Kerala, India
- Other name: Raman Siva Kumar
- Education: Kendriya Vidyalaya Pattom; Visva-Bharati University
- Alma mater: Kendriya Vidyalaya Pattom; Visva-Bharati University
- Occupations: Art historian, art critic and curator; principal of Kala Bhavana
- Notable work: Rabindra Chitravali (2011), The Last Harvest : Paintings of Rabindranath Tagore (2012)
- Movement: Bengal school of art Contextual Modernism
- Spouse: Mini Sivakumar
- Children: Siddharth Sivakumar (Son)

Raman Siva Kumar (born 3 December 1956), known as R. Siva Kumar, is an Indian contemporary art historian, art critic, and curator. His major research has been in the area of early Indian modernism with special focus on the Santiniketan School. He has written several important books, lectured widely on modern Indian art and contributed articles to prestigious international projects such as the Art Journal, Grove Art Online or The Dictionary of Art, Oxford University Press.

He was awarded the Kesari puraskaram for art writing by the Lalit Kala Akademi, Kerala in 2010. He has also curated major exhibitions like Santiniketan: The Making of a Contextual Modernism, and The Last Harvest : Paintings of Rabindranath Tagore and retrospectives of important Indian artists, such as Rabindranath Tagore, Benode Behari Mukherjee(co-curated with Ghulam Mohammed Sheikh), K. G. Subramanyan. He also has co-curated an exhibition titled "Tryst with Destiny" for the Singapore Art Museum to mark the 50 years of Indian Independence and served as a curatorial adviser for Rhythms of India: The Art of Nandalal Bose curated by Sonia Rhie Quintanilla for the San Diego Museum of Art.

== Early life and education ==
R. Siva Kumar was born in Kerala. After completing his early education in Pune and Kerala he moved to Santiniketan, where he joined Kala Bhavan and completed his MFA in history of art.

== Career ==
Since 1981, Professor Siva Kumar, who is often considered to be "the most erudite and self-effacing art historian" of his time, has been teaching art history at Kala Bhavana, where he has held several offices, including that of the Principal. His writings on Abanindranath Tagore and the Santiniketan artists have contributed a new perspective on them by shifting the critical focus from nationalist revivalism to a context sensitive modernism. Among his curated exhibitions Santiniketan: The Making of a Contextual Modernism commissioned to mark the fifty years of Indian independence, Benodebehari: A Centenary Retrospective (co-curated with Ghulam Mohammed Sheikh) and The Last Harvest : Paintings of Rabindranath Tagore commissioned to mark the 150th birth anniversary of Tagore are considered landmark exhibitions. The reputed Indian Magazine, Frontline reported, "The best show was the one (celebrating 50 years of Indian Independence) curated by R. Siva Kumar of Santiniketan, 'The Making of a Contextual Modernism', exhibiting about a hundred works each of Nandalal Bose, Rabindranath Tagore, Ram Kinker Baij and Benode Behari Mukherjee". While The Last Harvest : Paintings of Rabindranath Tagore was shown at ten major museums of the world including the Museum of Asian Art, Berlin; Asia Society, New York; National Museum of Korea, Seoul; Victoria and Albert Museum, London; The Art Institute of Chicago, Chicago; Petit Palais, Paris; National Gallery of Modern Art, Rome; National Visual Arts Gallery, Kuala Lumpur; McMichael Canadian Art Collection, Ontario; and National Gallery of Modern Art, Delhi.

In a review of Rabindra Chitravali in The Statesman, German scholar Martin Kämpchen (de) writes, "It collects excellently faithful reproductions of Rabindranath's paintings in large format. The editor, Kala Bhavan's art historian, Prof R . Siva Kumar, has spent his entire working life researching the Bengal School of Art, especially the Santiniketan crop of painters. This is the crowning achievement in this hard-working and self-effacing scholar's career."

For the Royal Asiatic Society, Cambridge Journals, W. Andrew Robinson wrote, "The unparalleled quality of the volumes' reproductions, made from new scans of the original works kept in Santiniketan, in New Delhi and elsewhere, and printed by India's leading art printer, Pragati Offset, based in Hyderabad, is thrillingly good. Rabindra Chitravali: Paintings of Rabindranath Tagore is surely one of the finest art books to have been produced in India.

Closely associated with the critical traditions of the Santiniketan his writings on Abanindranath and the Santiniketan artists have been recognised as making an important contribution to the reassessment and critical reception of these artists. Reviewing his book Paintings of Abanindranath Tagore Tapati Guha Takurta wrote: ‘With this magnum opus on Abanindranath Tagore, Siva Kumar can be seen to have traversed full circle within this particular lineage of art practice and art writing in Bengal. An art historical journey that began with and has continuously returned to the work of K. G. Subramanyan, has tracked its course backwards in time to mark out its significant inheritance, not just of the Santiniketan masters (Nandalal Bose, Rabindranath Tagore, Benode Behari Mukherjee and Ramkinkar Baij), but also in the little-known oeuvre of the later Abanindranath.'

In 2013 he was awarded by the Paschimbanga Bangla Akademi for his book Ram Kinkar Baij – A Retrospective.

R. Siva Kumar also received a special award from the University of Dhaka for his contribution to the Indian art scene.

== Contextual Modernism ==
In Santiniketan: The Making of a Contextual Modernism Siva Kumar introduced the term Contextual Modernism which later emerged as a postcolonial critical tool in the understanding of Indian art, specifically the works of Nandalal Bose, Rabindranath Tagore, Ram Kinker Baij and Benode Behari Mukherjee.

The brief survey of the individual works of the core Santiniketan artists and the thought perspectives they open up makes clear that though there were various contact points in the work they were not bound by a continuity of style but buy a community of ideas. Which they not only shared but also interpreted and carried forward. Thus they do not represent a school but a movement.

— Santiniketan: The Making of a Contextual Modernism, 1997

Several terms including Paul Gilroy’s counter culture of modernity and Tani Barlow's Colonial modernity have been used to describe the kind of alternative modernity that emerged in non-European contexts. Professor Gall argues that ‘Contextual Modernism’ is a more suited term because “the colonial in colonial modernity does not accommodate the refusal of many in colonized situations to internalize inferiority. Santiniketan’s artist teachers’ refusal of subordination incorporated a counter vision of modernity, which sought to correct the racial and cultural essentialism that drove and characterized imperial Western modernity and modernism. Those European modernities, projected through a triumphant British colonial power, provoked nationalist responses, equally problematic when they incorporated similar essentialisms.”

== Role in preventing Tagore fakes ==
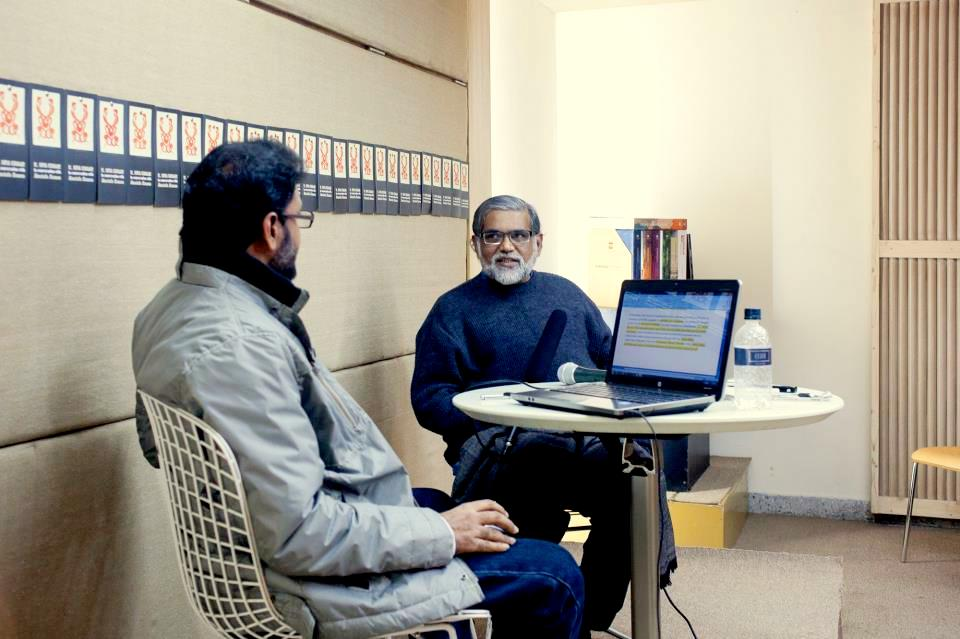
R. Siva Kumar being interviewed by a journalist in Dhaka, 2013

R. Siva Kumar, being an authority on Tagore's paintings, curator of his largest Exhibition and the author/editor of the most comprehensive reference work on Rabindranath's paintings has played an important role in preventing Tagore-fakes.

In 2011 the Government College of Art and Craft in Kolkata, under principal Dipali Bhattacharya, had organised an exhibition of 23 Tagore paintings. And later 20 were found to be fake. Siva Kumar, who had already seen digital images of the paintings and, convinced that they were all fakes, had warned the college principal, Dipali Bhattacharya, against holding the exhibition. But Bhattacharya went ahead with the claim that the paintings were "genuine".

“There’s a great market for Tagore's paintings and his works are of a rare kind. I had seen the reproductions and I knew they were fake. It's unfortunate because it completely destroys the oeuvre of the artist. But the problem of fakes is larger than what is made out of it." R. Siva kumar had revealed to the Indian Express. According to Siva Kumar the fakes were "by an academically trained artist — not old Santiniketan. Elements have been taken from different prints and then collaged together...This (Tagore-faking) needs to be nipped in the bud. The other day, I came upon a notice about an exhibition of Nandalal (Bose) and Abanindranath (Tagore), the medium being acrylic and canvas. Acrylic paints were not invented then. They are totally uninformed. The art world should wake up if it wants credibility. Institutions should be more careful. They have a certain responsibility to their heritage and legacy. The academic part of it should be more professional."

In 2014, Siva Kumar called for the formation of an investigation unit to track theft, copies and forgery of art. Times of India quoted him,"A national-level investigation agency should set up a team of specialists who follow only such cases so that they can see pattern or notice the involvement of same people or part of the same network. One can then consider putting an embargo on galleries and collectors whose names figure in such reports." He also urged that supportive legal measures should also be drafted. Explaining the rise in fakes originating from Bengal, he pointed to the revival of interest in art of early 20th century. "Bengal masters figured prominently in art history. Their works were few in circulation. Hence, when demand went up, it spawned fakes."

== Ramkinkar Baij ==
Ramkinkar Baij: A Retrospective, 1906-1980 is a book by R. Siva Kumar that was brought out on the occasion of a massive retrospective exhibition of Ramkinkar Baij at the National Gallery of Modern Art.

The exhibition was curated by K.S. Radhakrishnan and the book was brought out in collaboration with the Delhi Art Gallery. The book presents entire body of Ramkinkar's sketches, watercolours, etchings, oils, and sculptures, together with many period photographs. This is considered to be the authoritative volume on the “prolific master”.

Drawing distinction between Benode Behari Mukherjee and Ramkinkar Baij, Siva Kumar notes, "If his friend and colleague Binodebihari painted the starker side of Santiniketan landscape, and saw himself as a lonely palm tree in the middle of the barren and parched Khoai, Ramkinkar saw himself as the Palash in full bloom: No leaves, bare branches, fully ablaze".

In 2013 R. Siva Kumar was granted an award by the Paschimbanga Bangla Akademi for this book.

== Memberships and associations ==
- Member Advisory Committee, National Gallery of Modern Art for two terms
- Member of the Board of Studies of the School of Art and Aesthetics, Jawaharlal Nehru University
- Principal, Kala Bhavana(2008–2010)
- Nominated as "Eminent Art Historian" to the General Council of the Lalit Kala Akademi
- Member of the committee appointed by the Government of Kerala for the improvement of art education in Kerala
- Member Advisory Committee Lalit Kala Akademi
- Member Executive Council Visva Bharati(2008–2009)
- Vice-President SVAAD (Santiniketan Visual Artists and Designers Association)
- Nominated member of the Lalit Kala Akademi (2008–2011)
- Trustee of the Foundation for Indian Art and Education
- Governor's Nominee Rabindra Bharati University (2014)
- Mario Miranda Chair Professor in Art, Painting and Illustrative Art and Cartooning Goa University (2016-)
- ICCR Chair of Indian Studies at Carleton University, Canada (2018-)

== Awards and recognitions ==
- 'Kesari Puraskaram'for contribution to art writing, Kerala Lalit Kala Akademi, 2010.
- 'Manojmohan Smarak Puraskar' for book on Ramkinkar Baij, Paschimbanga Bangla Akademi, 2013.
- Felicitated with a plaque of special Honour by the Dhaka University, 2013.
- Awarded the title 'Rabindra Tattwacharya' by the Tagore Research Institute, Kolkata, 2015.
- Awarded 'Lifetime Achievement Award for Art History and Art Criticism' by the Government of West Bengal, 2018.

== Curated exhibitions ==
- An Exhibition of Abanindranath's Paintings, Kala Bhavana, Santiniketan,1985.
- Tryst with Destiny, Singapore Art Museum, Singapore, 1997.
- Santiniketan: The Making of a Contextual Modernism, National Gallery of Modern Art, New Delhi, 1997.
- K.G. Subramanyan: A Retrospective, National Gallery of Modern Art, New Delhi, 2002.
- Benodebehari: A Centenary Retrospective, National Gallery of Modern Art, New Delhi, 2006 (with Ghulam Mohammed Sheikh).
- The Last Harvest : Paintings of Rabindranath Tagore, Museum of Asian Art, Berlin , Asia Society, New York, National Museum of Korea, Seoul, Victoria and Albert Museum, London, The Art Institute of Chicago, Chicago, Petit Palais, Paris, Galleria Nazionale d'Arte Moderna, Rome, National Visual Arts Gallery, Kuala Lumpur, McMichael Canadian Art Collection, Ontario, National Gallery of Modern Art, New Delhi, National Gallery of Modern Art, Mumbai., National Gallery of Modern Art, Bangalore
- Selected Works of Ramachandran: from 1964–2013

== Major publications ==
- R. Siva Kumar. The Santiniketan Murals, Seagull Books.ISBN 8170461162.
- R. Siva Kumar. Santiniketan: The Making of a Contextual Modernism, National Gallery of Modern Art, New Delhi, 1997.
- R. Siva Kumar. K.G. Subramanyan: A Retrospective, National Gallery of Modern Art, New Delhi, 2003. ISBN 8187902132.
- R. Siva Kumar, A Ramachandran: A Retrospective, National Gallery of Modern Art, New Delhi, 2004. ISBN 9788187737049.
- R. Siva Kumar, K.S. Radhakrisnan, Art Alive Gallery, New Delhi, 2004.ISBN 8190184407.
- R. Siva Kumar. My Pictures: A Collection of Paintings by Rabindranath Tagore, Visva Bharati and Viva Books, New Delhi, 2005. ISBN 8130901595.
- R. Siva Kumar, The Khoai, Gallery Espace, New Delhi, 2007.
- R. Siva Kumar with Ghulam Mohammed Sheikh, Benodebehari Mukherjee: A Centenary Retrospective, National Gallery of Modern Art, New Delhi, 2007.ISBN 9788187737247
- R. Siva Kumar, K. G. Subramanyan: The Painted Platters, The Guild, Mumbai, 2007.ISBN 8190328336.
- R. Siva Kumar, Paintings of Abanindranath Tagore, Pratikshan Books, Kolkata, 2008.ISBN 81-89323-09-1.
- R. Siva Kumar, Sensibility Objectified: The Sculptures of Sarbari Roy Choudhury, Akar Prakar, Lalit Kala Akademi and Mapin, Kolkata, 2009.ISBN 1890206032. ISBN 978-1-890206-03-1.
- R. Siva Kumar, K. G. Subramanyan: Drawings, The Guild, Mumbai, 2010. ISBN 8187902132.
- R. Siva Kumar, Rabindra Chitravali: Paintings of Rabindranath, Pratikshan Books, Kolkata, 2011. ISBN Vol1: 978-81-89323-30-1 Vol2: 978-81-89323-31-1 Vol3: 978-81-89323-32-1 Vol4: 978-81-89323-33-1 Set: 978-81-89323-34-1 Catalogue: 978-81-89323-40-0.
- R. Siva Kumar, The Last Harvest: Paintings of Rabindranath, Mapin, Ahamedabad, 2011.(with contributions from William Radice, Uma Das Gupta, Kris Manjapra, Martin Kämpchen (de), etc.) ISBN 9788189995614.
- R. Siva Kumar, Ramkinkar Baij (book)", Delhi Art Gallery, New Delhi, 2012. ISBN 9381217246.
- R. Siva Kumar,Enchantment and Engagement: Murals of K.G. Subramanyan, Seagull Books, Kolkata, 2015.

== Selected articles ==
- ‘K.C.S. Paniker: A Retrospect’, Nandan, 1979.
- Catalogue article for the Sudhir Khastgir retrospective exhibition, Kala-Bhavan, March 1980.
- ‘Ramkinkar’, Kala Kaumaudi, August 1980.
- ‘A Room Between Rooms’ (being an essay on the art of Ramkinkar), Nandan, vol. 3, December 1980.
- ‘Sudhir Khastgir: A Critique’, Lalita Kala Contemporary, vol. 31, April 1981.
- ‘….. And the Theme is Destiny’, (being an essay on the murals of Benodebehari Mukherjee), Nandan, vol. 4, December 1981.
- ‘Faces of a Master’, (being an essay on the art of K.G. Subramanyan), Deccan Herald, December 1981.
- ‘Rembrandt and the Image as Parable’, The Visva-Bharati Quarterly, Vol. 46, 1982
- ‘Painting, Creativity and Communication’, Silpa O Samaj, Midnapur Silpi Chakra, 1983.
- ‘Sudhir Khastgir’, Indian Sculpture Today, Jehangir Art Gallery, Bombay, 1983.
- ‘K.G. Subramanyan: A Case for Versatility’, K.G. Subramanyan, Samyojita, Bangalore, 1983.
- ‘Art Treatises and Art Education’, (being a study of the nature and function of the art writings of Nandalal, Leonardo and Klee), Nandan, vol. 7, 1984.
- ‘Benodebehari’s Self-Portrait as an Artist’, Nandan, vol. 8, 1985.
- Translations of letters by Ravi Varma, Rabindranath and Abanindranath, Nandan, vol. 9, 1986.
- Catalogue article for K.G. Subramanyan’s exhibition of paintings by Kala Yatra at Bangalore, 1987.
- Catalogue article for the exhibition of sculptures by Somnath Hore at Kala Yatra, Bangalore, 1987.
- ‘Reba Hore : Reality in a Tender Light’, Art Heritage, vol. 8, New Delhi, 1989.
- ‘Versatile Expression’, The India Magazine, vol. 9, no. 10, New Delhi, 1989.
- ‘Ramkinkarer Jalaranger Chabbi’, Ramkinkar, ed. Prakash Das, 1989.
- ‘Ramkinkar’s Sculptures and Paintings’, (towards a catalogue raisonne) with J.J. Narzary, Ramkinkar, ed. Prakash Das, 1989.
- ‘Of Myth and Fairy Tale’, conversation with K.G. Subramanyan, Of Myth and Fairy Tale: Recent Works, Birla Academy of Art and Culture and The Seagull Foundation of the Arts, Calcutta, 1989.
- ‘The recent Works’, Of Myth and Fairy Tale: Recent Works, Birla Academy of Art and Culture and The Seagull Foundation of the Arts, Calcutta, 1989.
- ‘Remembering Ramkinkar’, Conversation with K.G. Subramanyan, Art Heritage, vol. 9, New Delhi, 1990.
- ‘Binodini and Other Portraits of Ramkinkar’, Nandan, vol. 10, 1990.
- ‘Nandalal’s Concept of the Artist: An Overview’, Nandan, vol. 11, 1991.
- ‘Nandalal Bose: Landscape Drawings’, catalogue article for exhibition of Nandalal’s landscape drawings, Nandan Art Gallery, Kala Bhavan, August 1992.
- Magazine Symposium on Modern Art, Prajavani, 1992.
- Catalogue Article for exhibition of K.G. Subramanyan’s paintings, Sakshi Gallery, Madras, 1992.
- ‘The Home and the World in Ravi Varma’, Ravi Varma: New Perspectives, National Museum, New Delhi, 1993.
- ‘The Bengal School and the Modern Art Scene in Bengal: Some Observations’, Trends and Images, CIMA, Calcutta, 1993.
- ‘Homage to Stella Kramrisch’, catalogue article to exhibition at Nandan Gallery, Kala Bhavan, September 1993.
- ‘Li Gotami Govinda’, catalogue article to exhibition at Nandan, Kala Bhavan, November 1994.
- ‘Chittaprosad’, catalogue article to exhibition at Nandan Gallery, Kala-Bhavan, November 1994.
- ‘Pilgrims Progress’, K.G. Subramanyan: Recent Works, CIMA, Calcutta, December 1994.
- ‘Abanindranath’s Paintings based on the Rubaiyat of Omar Khayyam, Lavanya, August 1995.
- ‘Contemporary Indian Sculpture: The Madras Metaphor’, review article, Marg, September 1995.
- ‘Somnath Hore: Images of Discontent’, Somnath Hore: Bronzes, CIMA, Calcutta, November 1995.
- ‘Images of Experience’, Jogen: Oils and Drawings, CIMA, Calcutta, February 1996.
- ‘Abanindranath Tagore: Beyond Nationalism’, The Visva-Bharati News, May–August 1996.
- ‘Abanindranath Tagore’, catalogue article 125th Birth Anniversary exhibition, Nandan Gallery, Kala Bhavan, September 1996.
- Entries on 9 Contemporary Indian Artists, The Dictionary of Art, Macmillan, London 1996.
- ‘Post-modernism, New – Internationalism, Pluralism’, in Art Objects in A Post-modern Age. (conference proceedings) Mohile Parikh Centre for the Visual Arts, Mumbai, 1997.
- ‘Image and Imagination: Five Contemporary Artists in India’, review article, Marg, vol. 48, no. 4, 1997.
- ‘Contemporary Indian Art: The Last Fifty years’, Tryst with Destiny, Singapore Art Museum, Singapore, 1997.
- ‘Early Abanindranath and Modern Western Art’, Nandan, vol. 17, December 1997.
- ‘On the Drawings and the Recent Paintings of K.G. Subramanyan’, exhibition catalogue, K.G. Subramanyan: Paintings and Drawings, Seagull, December 1998.
- ‘Ganesh Pyne: His Life and Times’, review article, Marg, vol. 50, no. 4, January 1999.
- ‘Modern Indian Art: An Overview’, Art Journal vol. 58, no. 3, Fall 1999, College Art Association, New York.
- ‘Santiniketan: Its Ideals and Its Masters’, Prabaha, An Exhibition of the Art of Bengal 1850–1999, Biswa Banga Sammalen, January 2000, Calcutta.
- ‘Of Roots and Differences’ Exile and Longing: Emerging Art Practices From Kerala, Lakeeran Art Gallery, Mumbai November 2000.
- ‘Abanindranath’s Arabian Nights: Native Flanerie and Anti-colonial Narration’, Nandan (Essays in Honour of K.G.Subramanyan), vol. 19, 1999, (published in December 2000).
- ‘Re-figuring Art, Re-articulating Figure: Indian Art 1870 – 1950’, Celebration of the Human Figure, Thinking Eye, New Delhi 2000.
- ‘Abanindranath and His Legacies’, Art of Bengal: Past and Present, C I M A, Kolkatta 2001.
- ‘Among Viewers and Images: A Triptych’, Nandan vol. 21, Santiniketan 2001.
- ‘Abanindranath and His Legacies’, Art of Bengal: Past and Present, CIMA, Kolkata 2001.
- ‘Jogen Choudhury’, Sidewinder (an exhibition of Contemporary Indian and British Artists, Kolkata/Delhi/Mumbai), CIMA, Kolkata, February 2002.
- ‘Ravinder Reddy’, Sidewinder (an exhibition of Contemporary Indian and British Artists, Kolkata/Delhi/Mumbai), CIMA, Kolkata, February 2002.
- ‘Culture specificity, Art Language and the Practice of Modernism: An Indian Perspective’, Contemporary Indian Art: Other Realities, Marg Publications, Mumbai, March 2002. ISBN 8185026556
- ‘When was Modernism’, (Riview of Geeta Kapur’s book When was Modernism and Other Essays), Marg vol.53, no.3, March 2002.
- ‘Sanat Kar: Musings without Angst’, Sanat Kar: A Retrospective of Bronzes and Prints, Birla Academy of Art and Culture, Kolkata September 2002.
- ‘Modern Indian Art: Circa 1850 to 2000’, Art Ways 2002, South Eastern Railway, Kolkata 2002.
- ‘Jogen Choudhury’, exhibition catalogue, Gallery Bose Pacia Modern, New York, October 2002.
- ‘An Image From the Hinterland’, Nandan, vol.22, December 2002
- ‘Aban-takurer Arabya-rajani: Deshi Flanerie evam’, Evam Musaira’, vol. 9, no. 4, January- March 2003.
- Catalogue text, Exhibition of Silkscreen prints by Kala Bhavana Teachers, Karzan Gallery, Vadodara, August 2004.
- ‘Remembering Bhupen’, A Tribute to Bhupen Khakhar, Tao Art Gallery, Mumbai August 2004.
- ‘Nandalal’s Drawings’, Searching Lines, No. 2, Kala Bhavana, Santiniketan, December 2004.
- ‘Benodebehari Mukhopadhyaya: Ekti Samiksha’, Bangadarshan 8–9, January–December 2004.
- ‘The Bhuddha and the Labyrinth of Bodies: Viewing the Ramp Obliquely’, The Ramp: a sculpture by K.S. Radhakrishnan, Art Alive Gallery, New Delhi, October 2004, Uttarayan Baroda, Vadodara, December 2004, Tao Art Gallery, Mumbai January 2005 and Galerie Sara Arakkal, Bangalore April 2005.
- ‘Jogen Choudhury: Lyric and Enigmatic Visions’, in Jogen Choudhury: Enigmatic Visions, Glenbara Art Museum, Japan, January 2005.
- ‘Blindness, Self, World and Art: Some Ruminations on Benodebehari, Chabi-lekha, Kolkata Vol. 2, 2005.
- ‘Indigenous Modernism in Bengal: A Few Facets’, Catalogue introduction to an exhibition early modern art from Bengal in the collection of the Birla Academy, Birla Academy of Art and Culture, Kolkata, 21 to 5 February March 2006.
- ‘Benodebehari Muhkopadhyay: Ekti Samiksha’, Bangadarshan, vol. 8–9 Magh- Poush 1410–11 (January – December 2004), Pub. February 2006, pp. 33– 70.
- 'Notes on Benode Behari, Ram Kinkar, K. G. Subramanyan, Somnath Hore, Sarbari Roy Choudhuri, and Gulam Mohammed Sheikh, Faces of Indian Art: Through the Lens of Nemai Ghosh', Art Alive Gallery, New Delhi, September 2007.
- ‘Intra Asian Transactions in Art’, Nandan, Ramkinkar Baij Centenary Number, Santiniketan, December 2007, pp. 23–28.
- ‘Colonialism, Cross Cultural Contact and Modernism’, Nandan vol.27, Santiniketan, December 2008.
- ‘Nandalal: His Vision of Art and Art Education’, Rhythms of India: The Art of Nandalal Bose, San Diego Museum of Art, California, February 2008. ISBN 0-937108-43-X, pp. 80–91
- ‘Ramkinkar Baij and Modernism’s Dual Commitments’, Santal Family Positions around an Indian Sculpture, Museum van Hedendaagse Kunst, Antwerp 2008.
- ‘Sara Abraham: Connoisseur and Collector’, Celebrating Sara: Sara Abraham's Collection of Art Over Fifty Years, TnQ Books and Journals, Chennai, February 2008.
- ‘Images of an Enchanting Journey’, An Enchanting Journey: Paresh Maity's Kerala, Art Alive Gallery, New Delhi 2008.
- ‘Remembering a Friend as Printmaker’, Suranjan Basu 1957–2002: A Retrospective, Seagull Foundation for the Arts, Kolkata November 2008, pp. 81–88.
- ‘Travels into Liminality with Musui’, K.S. Radhakrishnan: Liminal Figures Liminal Space, Birla Academy of Art and Culture, Kolkata, November 2008.
- ‘Santiniketan:una comunidad de artistas e ideas’, India Moderna, Casa Asia –Institut Valencia d’Art Moderna, (authors: Juan Guardiola, John Falconer, K G Subramanyan, Deepak Ananth, Geeta Kapur and R Siva Kumar), Valencia – Spain, 2008, ISBN 9788448251048
- ‘Santiniketan: Its Ideals and its Masters,’ From the Everyday to the Imagined: An Exhibition of Indian Art, (Authors: Jan Wee and R Siva Kumar), Singapore Art Museum, Singapore and Seoul National University, Seoul, South Korea, 2008. ISBN / ISBN 9789810594428
- ‘Representing the Nation: Two paintings by Abanindranath’, Art and Deal Vol. 6, No.1, January 2009, pp. 24–27.
- ‘Globalism, Rabindranath and Some Thoughts on Location’, Assam University Journal: Humanities and Social Sciences, Vol. 4, No.1, January 2009.
- ‘Santiniketan: A Development in Three Movements’, Gayatri Singha Ed. Art and Visual Culture in India 1857–2007, Marg Publications, Mumbai, January 2009, pp. 104–117. ISBN 9788185026923
- ‘A Priliminary Note on Khuddur Jatra’, Khuddur Jatra, Prarikshan, Kolkata, 2009
- ‘Somnath Hore:A Reclusive Socialist and Modernist’, Bengal Art: New Perspectives, Praikshan Essays in the Arts 1, Kolkatta 2010, pp. 55–78.
- ‘Somnath Hore: A Socialist and Modernist Artist’, Somnath Hore, Prints, Drawings, Posters, Kala Bhavan and Seagull, February 2011, pp. 44–96
- ‘Catalogue Introduction’, Arun Pal: Paintings and Drawings, Nandan Gallery, Santiniketan, March 2011.
- ‘Rabindranath Tagore como Pintor y Catalizador del Arte Indio Moderno’ Redescubriendo a Tagore, Amaranta, Indo-Latin American Cultural Initiative, Bombay in Collaboration with Sahitya Akademi, New Delhi, 2011. ISBN 978-81-921843-1-9, pp. 155–169.
- ‘The Arabian Nights and the Web of Stories’, Art Etc., Kolkata June 2012, pp. 26–29.
- ‘Mural Shilpy Subramanyan’, Anustup, Vol 47, No. 1, Autumn 2012, pp. 851–864.
- ‘An Extraordinary Cohesiveness’, Sudhir Patrwardhan The Guild, November 2012.
- 'Preface to Between Darkness and Magic: Examining the Kerala Metaphor', CIMA Gallery, Kolkata, 7 December 2012 to 5 January 2013
- ‘A Celebration of this Oddly Mixed-up Scene’, introduction to K G Subramanyan exhibition at the Focus Gallery, Chennai, January 2013.
- ‘Ramkinkar Baij and Modern Indian Sculpture’, Take on Art, Vol. 3, No. 10, January 2013 ISSN 0976-4011, pp. 32–35
- ‘Jogen Choudhury: Lyric and Enigmatic Visions’, Jogen Choudhury Retrospective, Nandan Kala Bhavana, Santiniketan 11–28 February 2013, pp. 4–8.
- ‘Santiniketan. Eine Welt-Universität, Raman Siva Kumar in Gespräch mit Regina Bittner und Kathrin Rhomberg’, Das Bauhaus in Kalkutta. Eine Begegnung kosmopolitischer Avantgarden, Bauhaus Edition 36, Hatje Cantz Verlag, Ostfildern 2013, pp. 111–118. ISBN 978-3-7757-3656-5
- ‘Lord, let each day of mine be a festival, a celebration: A conversation between R. Siva Kumar and K. G. Subramanyan,’ K. G. Subramanyan: New Works, Seagull Foundation for the Arts, Kolkata 2014.

== See also ==
- Rabindra Chitravali
- Paintings of Abanindranath Tagore
- Kala Bhavana
- The Last Harvest : Paintings of Rabindranath Tagore (book)
- The Last Harvest: Paintings of Rabindranath Tagore
- Stella Kramrisch
- Ananda Coomaraswamy
- Santiniketan: The Making of a Contextual Modernism
- Ernest Binfield Havell
