= People associated with Santiniketan =

The following is a list of notable people associated with Visva- Bharati University and/or Santiniketan, a neighbourhood in Bolpur city in West Bengal, India:

== People in the Tagore family ==
- Debendranath Tagore established Santiniketan in 1861, a small place for prayers and meditation with land from Bhuban Mohan Singha of Raipur.
- Rabindranath Tagore started a Brahmacharyaashrama in 1901 and it came to be known as Patha Bhavana from 1925. Founded in 1921 by him, Visva Bharati was declared to be a central university in 1951. In 1913, Rabindranath won the Nobel Prize in Literature. He wrote many of his literary classics at Santiniketan.
- Rathindranath Tagore, after completing his education first at Santiniketan and then abroad, spent the next four decades of his life serving Santiniketan and Visva Bharati.
- Pratima Devi was a talented artist and contributed substantially to improvising and popularising Rabindranath's dance dramas.
- Krishna Kripalani, husband of Nandita, a grand daughter of Rabindranath, taught at Santiniketan for about 15 years, His biography of Tagore was amongst the best ever written.
- Dwijendranath Tagore, Rabindranath's eldest brother, spent the last twenty years of his life at Santiniketan. He was a poet, musician, philosopher and mathematician.
- Dinendranath Tagore, grandson of Dwijendranath, was a talented musician. He codified many of the tunes that appeared impetuously to Rabindranath. He named Rabindranath's songs as Rabindra Sangeet. He was the first principal of Sangit Bhavana.
- Indira Devi Chaudhurani, daughter of Satyendranath Tagore, excelled in both Western and Indian classical music and composed Brahmasangit. She wrote the notations for many of Rabindranath's songs.
- Abanindranath Tagore, founder of the Bengal school of art joined as chancellor of Visva Bharati in 1942.
- Asit Kumar Haldar, was art teacher in Santiniketan Vidyalaya from 1911 to 1915 and was incharge of Kala Bhavana from 1919 to 1921.

== People of foreign citizenship or origin ==
This list includes names of persons who may have been citizens of British India, but later became citizens of Pakistan/ Bangladesh

- Charles Freer Andrews (Deenabandhu Andrews) was a lifelong friend of Rabindranath Tagore and assisted in setting up Visva Bharati.
- Leonard Knight Elmhirst, set up the Institute of Rural Reconstruction at Sriniketan.
- Khan Abdul Ghani Khan, poet and philosopher, son of Abdul Ghaffar Khan, was sent to Santiniketan, along with Indira Gandhi, by Jawaharlal Nehru. Although known primarily as a poet, he got interested in sculpture, while studying in Santiniketan. He spent his later years in Pakistan.
- Martin Kämpchen is a Santiniketan-based translator of Rabindranath Tagore's poems from Bengali to German, author, journalist and social worker.

When I decided to return to West-Bengal at the end of 1979, I moved to Santiniketan where I am still based. I had not settled in Santiniketan because I felt drawn to Rabindranath. Rather, it was the peace and quiet which then still engulfed this small University town, which made me decide to settle there for work on a Ph.D. True, I had read the English Gitanjali and some other slim books and was charmed by them. But I had no foreboding that Rabindranath would soon occupy a central position in my life.

— Martin Kämpchen,

- Anand Yang, historian, was born and initially raised here.
- Savitri Devi, the pseudonym of the daughter of a French citizen of Greek-Italian ancestry and an English woman, born Maximiani Portas, was a political activist and writer. She was at Santiniketan for a short while and acquired her pseudonym there.
- Affandi, the Indonesian master, was at Santiniketan in 1951. His daughter Kartika Affandi had accompanied him.

== Notable alumni ==
=== Arts and letters ===
==== Film and television ====
In the two and a half years, I had time to think, and time to realise that, without my being aware of it, the place had opened windows for me. More than anything else, it had brought me an awareness of our tradition, which I knew would serve as a foundation for any branch of art that I wished to pursue.

— Satyajit Ray,

Name	Class year	Notability	Ref.
Satyajit Ray		studied oriental art at Visva Bharati, went on become a legendary film maker.	

==== Writing ====
Those nine years in Shantiniketan are the best days of my life. It was also the golden period for Shantiniketan...

— Shivani,

Name	Class year	Notability	Ref.
Mahasweta Devi		studied English honours at Visva Bharati, became a Bengali writer and social activist, won Jnanpith Award, Ramon Magsaysay Award, Padma Vibhushan and other honours	
Shivani		well known Hindi writer and Padma Shri award winner, went to Santiniketan in 1936, when she was 12-years old and remained till her graduation.	
Sagarmoy Ghosh		younger brother of Santidev Ghosh, attended school at Santiniketan. He subsequently became assistant editor of the literary magazine Desh in 1933 and its editor in 1976. He made Desh an institution amongst Bengalis. He was conferred Desikottama.	
Nabakanta Barua		noted Assamese poet, novelist and dramatist, completed his undergraduate education at Santiniketan. He later received the Sahitya Akademi Award and was conferred the Padma Bhusan.	
Arianna Huffington		Greek-American journalist-entrepreneur, was a student of comparative religion at Visva Bharati.	
Jan Yun-hua		a researcher and writer, did his PhD from Cheena Bhavana and joined McMaster University in Canada.	
Bhuwan Dhungana	1971	Nepali poet and storywriter. She received a Diploma in Manipuri dance and Bengali literature.	

==== Visual arts ====
Name	Class year	Notability	Ref.
Krishna Reddy		master printmaker at Atelier 17 and sculptor, studied at Kala Bhavana.	
Mukul Dey		pioneering printmaker and graphic artist; first Indian principal of Government School of Art & Craft, Kolkata went to school at Santiniketan in its earlier days.	
Jayasri Burman		an artist staying and working in Paris, graduated from Kala Bhavana.	
Sreeraj Gopinathan		an artist based in Berlin, studied at Santiniketan.	
Dinanath Bhargava		was a student of Kala Bhavana and is credited with having developed the adaptation of the national emblem and designed other pages of the Constitution of India.	
Kripal Singh Shekhawat		one of the illustrators of the Indian constitution, was a student of Kala Bhavana.	
Kailash Chandra Meher		painter, studied at Kala Bhavana. He was later conferred Padma Shri.	
Ramkinkar Baij		came to Santiniketan at a young age and went on to become a legendary sculptor and artist. He was one of the 'greats', who made Santiniketan, a notable centre of modern art. He was elected a Fellow of the Lalit Kala Academy and conferred Padma Bhushan, Desikottama by Visva Bharati and D Litt by Rabindra Bharati University.	
Benode Behari Mukherjee		was a student of Kala Bhavana and later joined the faculty. A brilliant artist, he was elected a Fellow of the Lalit Kala Academy and conferred Padma Vibhushan and Desikottama.	
K.G. Subramanyan		noted painter and Padma Vibhushan award winner, was a student of Kala Bhavana and later came back to teach at Santiniketan.	
Beohar Rammanohar Sinha		the renowned artist and illustrator of the Indian constitution, was a student at Kala Bhavana and later also associated actively.	
Dinkar Kaushik		was a noted painter who had studied at Kala Bhavana and later as principal reshaped it for contemporary art practices.	
Sankho Chaudhuri		who was student at Santiniketan and was later actively associated with it. He was conferred with Desikottama and Padma Shri.	

==== Music ====
There was a much closer bond with nature. Secondly, there was music everywhere, a scene that was quite new to someone who had come from Bangladesh. Thirdly, the understanding and relationship between teachers and students was integral in bringing about a positive change in our lifestyle.

— Rezwana Chowdhury Bannya,

Name	Class year	Notability	Ref.
Suchitra Mitra		the Rabindra Sangeet exponent was a student of Sangit Bhavana.	
A. Ramachandran		noted painter and Padma Bhusan award winner, was a student of Kala Bhavana.	
Subinoy Roy		came to Santiniketan to study Chemistry and became a renowned singer specialising in Rabindrasangeet.	
Sumitra Guha		exponent of both Carnatic and Hindusthani classical music. After learning Carnatic classical music as a child from her mother, she came to Santiniketan to study philosophy and got attracted towards Hindusthani classical music.	
Sahana Bajpaie		a prominent Rabindra Sangeet singer, was born and educated at Santiniketan.	
Santidev Ghosh		joined as a student in the ashrama and later became a teacher and Principal of Sangit Bhavana. An exponent of music and dance, he was elected for the Sangeet Natak Akademi Fellowship, conferred Desikottama by Visva Bharati and honorary D Litt by Burdwan University.	
Kanika Banerjee		was trained at Sangit Bhavana, and later joined the institution as a teacher and went on to become its principal. She was conferred Desikottama. She had over 300 gramophone discs to her credit and sang regularly in numerous programmes in India and abroad.	
Gourgopal Ghosh		was a student and later a teacher at Santiniketan.	
Nilima Sen		Rabindra Sangeet exponent, was a student at Santiniketan and later joined the faculty at Sangit Bhavana.	
Aditi Mohsin		Bangladeshi singer, was a topper at Sangit Bhavana.	
Shayan Chowdhury Arnob		Bangladeshi musician, singer and composer, spent 17 years at Santiniketan.	
Ananda Samarakoon		composer and musician, who had composed the Sri Lankan national anthem, had studied at Santiniketan for a short spell.	
Rezwana Chowdhury Bannya		the Bangladeshi exponent of Rabindra Sangeet, was trained at Santiniketan. She was conferred the Independence Day Award, the highest civilian award in Bangladesh in 2016.	

==== Performing arts ====
Name	Class year	Notability	Ref.
Mrinalini Sarabhai		joined Santiniketan in 1939.	

=== Scientists and academics ===
It was mainly in Tagore’s school that my educational attitudes were formed. This was a co-educational school, with many progressive features. The emphasis was on fostering curiosity rather than competitive excellence, and any kind of interest in examination performance and grades was severely discouraged…Since I was, I have to confess, a reasonably good student, I had to do my best to efface that stigma.

— Amartya Sen,

Name	Class year	Notability	Ref.
Amartya Sen		who was born at Santiniketan and studied at Patha Bhavana, later won the Nobel Memorial Prize in Economic Sciences.	
Pradip K. Chakraborti		a molecular biologist, who did his Ph D from Visva Bharati University, was the chief scientist at the Institute of Microbial Technology. He is an elected fellow of all three Science Academies in India - the National Academy of Sciences, Indian Academy of Sciences and the Indian National Science Academy.	
Chitra Dutta		scientist and coordinator, Bio Informatics Centre, Indian Institute of Chemical Biology, Kolkata, had studied physics at Santiniketan.	
Manoj Majee		plant molecular biologist, biochemist, inventor and a senior scientist at the National Institute of Plant Genome Research (NIPGR), New Delhi. He is known for his studies on the molecular and biochemical basis of seed vigor, longevity and seedling establishment. He completed his post graduation in botany at Santiniketan.	
Anirban Basu		neurobiologist, senior scientist at National Brain Research Centre, Manesar, Gurgaon, completed his pre-doctoral studies in life sciences at Visva Bharati University.	
R. Siva Kumar		who studied history of art at Kala Bhavana, later joined as faculty and became its principal, is a leading art historian and has curated numerous art exhibitions.	
Tan Chung		did his Ph D from Visva Bharati University and went on hold important academic positions as a Chinese scholar. He was conferred with Desikottama, Padma Bhusan and other awards.	
Syed Mujtaba Ali		was one of the earliest students of Visva Bharati and later became a professor of Islamic history and culture. He also taught the German language at Visva Bharati. He was a Bengali author, academic and linguist.	
Giuseppe Tucci		stayed after his graduation at Santiniketan, where he studied Buddhism and Bengali and taught Italian, Chinese and Tibetan.	
Ragadeepika Pucha	2010–2015	completed MSc in physics, and became astrophysicist at the University of Arizona and the University of Utah. She has produced the largest 3D map of the universe and discovered the most number of dwarf galaxies and black holes.	

=== Government and law ===
==== Parliamentarians ====
Before Santiniketan there was absolutely no music in our home. At Santiniketan, my relationship with all these things grew. We also went closer to nature.

— Indira Gandhi,

Name	Class year	Notability	Ref.
Indira Gandhi		studied at the Patha Bhavana, Santiniketan, later became Prime Minister of India.	

==== Judges ====
Name	Class year	Notability	Ref.
Sudhi Ranjan Das		who studied at Patha Bhavana, Santiniketan, and became Chief Justice of India.	

==== Activists ====
Name	Class year	Notability	Ref.
Malati Choudhury		civil rights and freedom activist, studied at Santiniketan. She later married Nabakrushna Choudhuri.	
Kalyan Banerjee		President of Rotary International in 2011–2012, was a student at Santiniketan.	

=== Others ===
Name	Class year	Notability	Ref.
Gayatri Devi		then princess of Cooch Behar and later Maharani of Jaipur, was a student at Santiniketan.	

== Notable faculty ==
Name	Tenure	Notability	Ref.
Ajit Kumar Chakravarty	1903–1910	taught at Santiniketan and translated Tagore's works into English.	
Lisa von Pott		Austrian, first instructor in sculpture at Kala Bhavana, later spy for the Nazis in Vienna.	
Hasan Shaheed Suhrawardy		was a scholar and Nizam professor of Iranian Art at Visva Bharati. He later migrated to Pakistan and settled in Karachi.	
Alex Aronson		taught in Santiniketan from 1937 to 1944. He was a prolific writer and was conferred the Desikottama.	
Gyula Germanus		was a Hungarian orientalist, Islamologist and writer. In 1928, Tagore invited him to organise the Islamic history department at Visva Bharati.	
Tan Yun-Shan		was a Chinese scholar and effective founder of Santiniketan's Cheena Bhavana, the oldest centre of Chinese studies in India. He devoted his life to the cause of Sino-Indian cultural friendship. He was conferred with Desikottama.	
William W. Pearson		taught at Santiniketan and translated Tagore's books into English.	
Stella Kramrisch		Austrian art historian, taught at Kala Bhavana, Santiniketan in 1922–24. A skilled dancer she taught "musical drill" to the children of Santiniketan ashrama. She was conferred Desikottama and Padma Bhusan.	
Vincenc Lesný		Czech Indologist and translator, taught at Santiniketan and has translated Tagore into Czech.	
Xu Beihong		one of the pioneers of Chinese modern art, was visiting professor of Chinese fine arts at Santiniketan in 1939.	
Luther Carrington Goodrich		from Columbia University came as visiting professor of Sinology at Santiniketan in 1953–54.	
Nandalal Bose		was one of the pioneers of modern Indian art. Many critics consider his paintings among India's most important modern paintings. A Padma Vibhushan awardee he has trained a generation of artists at Santiniketan.	
Surendranath Kar		was an artist and architect known for developing an Indian style of architecture. He taught at Kala Bhavana and designed many buildings at Santiniketan	
Guru Kelu Nair		was the first Kathakali teacher at Santiniketan from 1937 to 1941.	
Somnath Hore		sculptor and printmaker, taught at Kala Bhavana. He was recipient of the Padma Bhusan award.	
Jogen Chowdhury		eminent painter and parliamentarian, teaches at Kala Bhavana.	
Shakti Chattopadhyay		the Hungry generation poet, was a visiting professor at Visva Bharati after his retirement from Ananda Bazar Patrika	
Banarsidas Chaturvedi		journalist, writer, parliamentarian and Padma Bhusan award winner played an active role in the setting up and construction of the Hindi Bhavana at Santiniketan in 1939.	
Hazari Prasad Dwivedi		taught Hindi at Visva Bharati and helped in establishing Hindi Bhavana, He was its head for many years. A noted Hindi writer and winner of the Sahitya Akademi Award, he was conferred Padma Bhusan.	
Haricharan Bandopadhayaya		was a scholar best known for his 5-volume Bangiya Sabdakosh (Bengali dictionary), worked at Santiniketan all his life. He was conferred the Desikottama.	
Ujjwal Maulik		Computer Scientist, Fellow of IEEE, USA was a faculty in Computer Science at Visva Bharati University, Santiniketan.	
Sailajaranjan Majumdar		came to Santiniketan to teach chemistry and went on to be principal of Sangit Bhavana. A distinguished exponent and teacher of Rabindra Sangeet, he was conferred Desikottama.	
Sylvain Lévi		was visiting professor at Santiniketan. He was a leading Orientalist.	
Moriz Winternitz		was originating from Austria, he was Jewish. He was an Oriental scholar who was visiting professor at Santniketan in 1923–24.	
Walter Liebenthal		German Indologist, Sinlogist and Buddhist scholar, was visiting professor and fellow before becoming director of the Sino-Indian Institute in 1955–1960 at Santiniketan.	
Santosh Chandra Majumdar		was one of the first five students of Brahmavidyalaya at Santiniketan and was associated with Santiniketan most of his later life.	
Prabhat Kumar Mukhopadhyaya		was associated with Santiniketan almost all his working life, He is best known as the biographer of Rabindranath. He was honoured with Desikottama and Padma Bhusan.	
Amiya Chakravarty		literary critic, academic and Bengali poet, was associated with Visva Bharati from 1924 to 1933. Thereafter, he earned a D Phil from Oxford university and worked in various academic positions in India and abroad. He won the Sahitya Akademi Award and was conferred the Desikottama and Padma Bhusan.	
Kshitimohan Sen		was principal of Vidya Bhavana and vice chancellor for some time. He was a scholar and researcher.	
David McCutchion	1957-1960	was a Coventry born scholar who came to India as a lecturer of English literature at Visva Bharati. He is famous for his pioneering work on the terracotta temples of Bengal.	

== Other Indians ==
- Satyendra Prasanna Sinha, 1st Baron Sinha, of Raipur, had donated for the construction of Singha Sadan with a clock tower and bell. It was in this building that Oxford University conferred its honorary doctorate on the poet.
- Brajendra Nath Seal, philosopher and vice-chancellor of Mysore University, presided over the inauguration of Visva Bharati on 23 December 1921, and presided over the Visva Bharati Society.
- Prasanta Chandra Mahalanobis, founder of the Indian Statistical Institute, framed the constitution of Visva Bharati in 1921, and was general secretary from 1921 to 1932.
- Nabakrushna Choudhuri freedom fighter was at Santiniketan for a short time. He later became chief minister of Odisha.

== See also ==
- List of Vice-Chancellors of Visva-Bharati University
