= Cheena Bhavana =

School part of Visva-Bharati University

- Visva-Bharati University
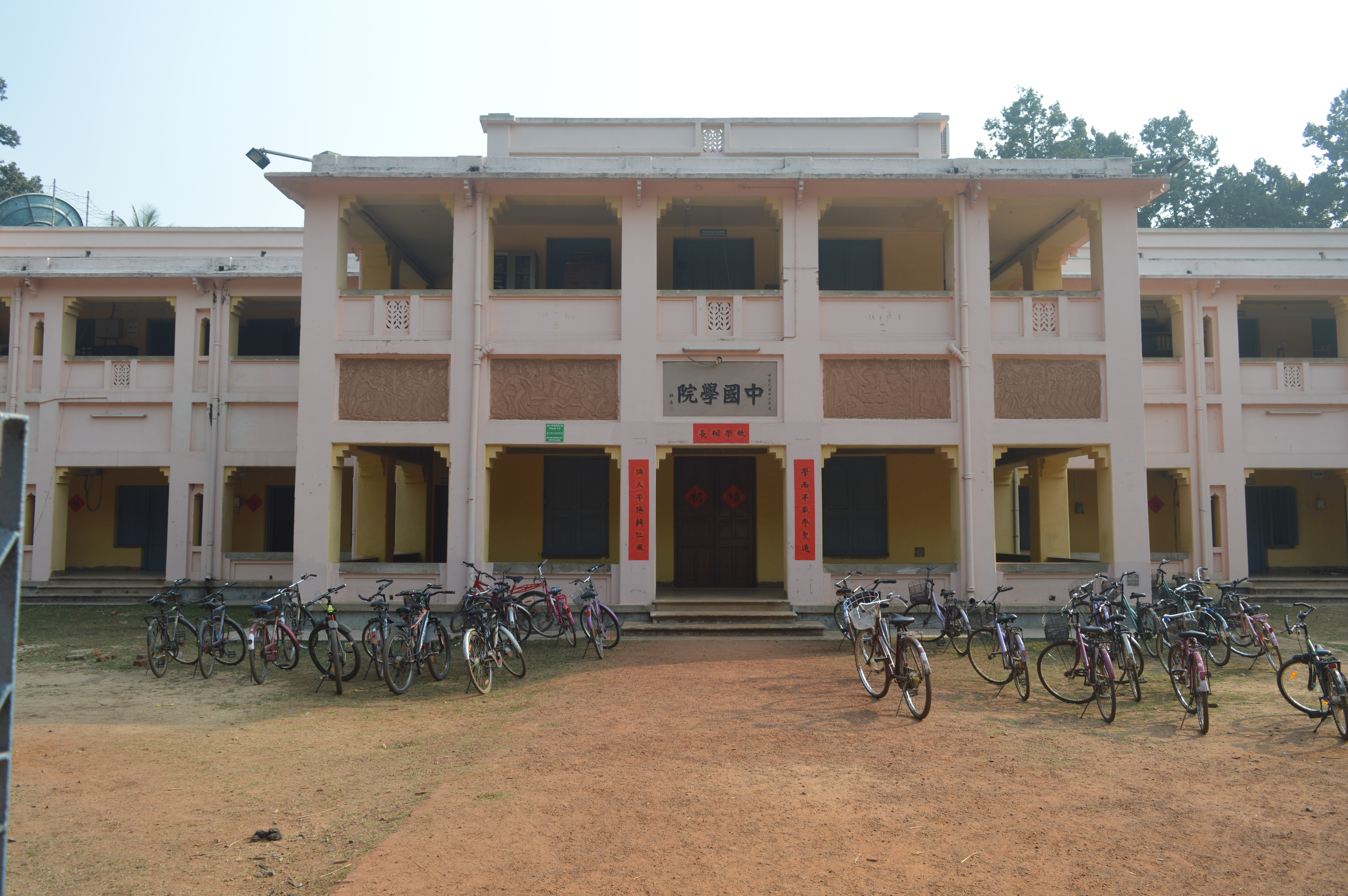
- Cheena Bhavana - Visva-Bharati University
- Location: Santiniketan, West Bengal, India
- Coordinates: 23.67921°N 87.68671°E
- Founder: Rabindranath Tagore, Tan Yun-Shan
- Established: 1937
- Director: Dr. Avijit Banerjee
- Website: Cheena Bhavana

Cheena Bhavana, (Institute of Chinese Language and Culture) of Visva-Bharati University, founded in 1937, is a centre of Sino-Indian cultural studies located at Santiniketan in West Bengal, India. Its reputation as a center promoting historical study and modern relations between the two countries was built by such figures as Rabindranath Tagore and Tan Yun-Shan. The library is known for a major collection of Chinese books and journals, especially Buddhist scriptures and texts.

== The beginning ==
This is, indeed, a great day for me, a day long looked for, when I should be able to redeem, on behalf of our people, an ancient pledge implicit in our past, the pledge to maintain the intercourse of culture and friendship between our people and the people of China, an intercourse whose foundations were laid eighteen hundred years back by our ancestors with infinite patience and sacrifice.

— Rabindranath Tagore,

Cheena Bhavana was a part of Tagore's grand concept of the world making its home in a single nest, Tan Yun-Shan was the person who built and developed Cheena Bhavana. He was born in Hunan province of China and belonged to a distinguished family of scholars. A calligraphist, poet, essayist, author and writer, Tan was also a linguist trained in Chinese classical literature and philosophy. In his personal life he was a devoted Mahayana Buddhist and a Confucian scholar versed in Confucian classics, Laozi (Lao-Tze)’s philosophy, and Chinese metaphysics. He gained the reputation of being able to satisfy all with his sober approach and his politeness left a mark in the minds of those with whom he came in regular contact.

Rabindranath Tagore discovered Tan Yun-Shan in Malaya in 1927, three years after his historic visit to China. Inspired by the poet’s message of peace and understanding, Tan arrived in Santiniketan and immersed himself in cultural dialogue with the intellectual elite of the ashram. At the same time, he engaged himself in Indological studies. India and China had for ages a rich tradition of cultural exchange. The names of Faxian (Fa Hien), Xuangzang (Hiuen Tsang) and Yijing (I-Tsing) were well-known, but there had been a break of a thousand years in such exchanges. The idea struck both the poet and the Chinese scholar that a permanent institute could serve as a nucleus for cultural exchange. Tan Yun-Shan went to China in 1931, to acquaint people there about the ideals of Tagore's Visva Bharati and garner support for cultural cooperation. With a warm response for cultural cooperation, the Sino-Indian Cultural Society was initiated at Nanjing in 1933. He returned to India the next year and a similar society was set up in 1934. The Cheena Bhavana was established in 1937. He spent over 30 years in its service.

== The building ==
At Santiniketan Tan Yun-Shan realised that his work required a separate hall/ building but Visva Bharati, then a private institution, was short of funds. Tan decided to move around to collect money for the purpose and he took on odd jobs to support himself. He went to Singapore, Rangoon and China for the purpose. Tan came back to Santiniketan in 1936 with adequate funds (Rs. 50,000) for his cherished China Hall and 100,000 books (collected with the support of the Sino-Indian Cultural Society). Tagore was thrilled and allotted land in the heart of Santiniketan for construction of Cheena Bhavana. The hall was designed in collaboration with Surendranath Kar and Tang supervised its construction. The building was completed in record time. Nandalal Bose, Benode Behari Mukherjee and others from Kala Bhavana adorned the hall with beautiful frescoes and relief work. Chinese calligraphy written by Lin Sen, the President of China, was placed in the centre-front on the building with similar calligraphy by Tai Chi-Tao at centre-rear. Tan planted trees all around the building. On 14 April 1937, Cheena Bhavana, the first institute of its kind in India, was formally inaugurated by Indira Gandhi. Tan was appointed its first director. However, in view of Visva Bharati’s grim financial situation Tan refused to take a salary. The Chinese government provided him an honorarium. Mahatma Gandhi, in his message to Tagore said: "May the Chinese Hall be a symbol of living contact between China and India". Jugal Kishore Birla donated Rs. 5,000 to start research activities. Fund collection continued.

In 1942, Chiang Kai-shek, the Chinese nationalist leader and supremo, and Madame Chiang, visited Cheena Bhavana. They were pleased with the progress of the institution that had already received financial support from China and announced a further donation of Rs. 50,000. In 1957, during a trip to India, Zhou Enlai, the Chinese premier, visited Santiniketan. He came to Cheena Bhavana and donated Rs. 60,000 for a memorial to Tagore.

== The institution ==
Tagore died in 1941. He had planted the seed that had started germinating. It was left to Tan, almost single-handedly, to make it grow, in spite of barriers and vicissitudes. He made it a ‘monumental edifice’. Even after Visva Bharati became a central university Tan helped to maintain its magnificent stature. Two characteristics that developed in Cheena Bhavana under Tan Yun-Shan are notable. First, it led to the establishment of Chinese studies in other places in India. Second, for a considerable period, teachers for the new institutes were drawn from Cheena Bhavana. It is thought that Cheena Bhavana was more than a mere academic institution and its special achievements are having a permanent value. First, it generated new ideas about Sino-Indian culture that flew out and permeated the environment. Second, it became a sort of a model and functioned as a cradle of Sino-Indian affection. Third, it functioned as a link and bridge between India and China.

== Some linkages with Cheena Bhavana ==
Some important linkages with Cheena Bhavana are given below:

- 1939 – The first Chinese Buddhist Mission to India led by Taixu spent a week at Santiniketan as guests in Cheena Bhavana.
- 1940 – Tai Chi-Tao, Buddhist scholar and admirer of Mahatma Gandhi and Rabindranath Tagore visited Santiniketan
- 1941–1945 – Chin Ke-Mu spent several semesters in Cheena Bhavana and returned to Beijing University as a Professor of Sanskrit.
- 1941–1943 – Karuna Kusalasaya spent two years as research scholar and assisted the Director. He returned to Thailand as professor of Sanskrit at the Buddhist University in Bangkok.
- 1941–1946 – Rev Pannasiri from Ceylon spent five years in research work.
- 1942 – Rev Fa Fang from China studied Indian Buddhism as a research scholar at Cheena Bhavana for three years, studied the Southern School of Buddhism in Ceylon, taught at Santiniketan for two years before going back to China.
- 1942 – Wu Bei-Hui joined Cheena Bhavana, carried out research in Sanskrit and Hindi for ten years and returned to Beijing University as Professor of Sanskrit.
- 1945 – Prabodh Chandra Bagchi joined as Senior Research Fellow and Director of Research under Chinese Government Fellowship. Then he went to Beijing University and finally became vice-chancellor of Visva Bharati University.
- 1945 – Purushottam Vishvanath Bapat joined as senior research fellow and professor.
- 1947 – Sisir Kumar Ghosh joined Cheena Bhavana as research fellow and joint editor of the Sino-Indian Journal. He later became head of the English department.
- 1950–1965? - Jan Yun-hua, a researcher and writer, did his PhD from Cheena Bhavana and joined McMaster University in Canada.
- 1953–1954 - Luther Carrington Goodrich from Columbia University came as visiting professor of Sinology at Santiniketan.
- 1955–1960 - Walter Liebenthal, German Indologist, Sinologist and Buddhist scholar, was director of the Sino-Indian Institute (Cheena Bhavana?).
- 1979-1987 - Tan Cheng, the second son of Tan Yunshan, taught at Cheena Bhavana during these years. He and his wife, Zhu Xuehui, offered their home to many Chinese scholars.
- 2014 – The Chinese President Xi Jinping conferred the Five Principles of Peaceful Coexistence Friendship Award on the Cheena-Bhavana on 19 September 2014 at a function in New Delhi for its contribution to uphold The Five Principles of Peaceful Coexistence, strengthening people to people friendship and promoting world peace and development.

== A Tagore in Cheena Bhavana ==
Amitendranath Tagore, grandson of Abanindranath Tagore, was amongst the earliest students of Cheena Bhavana in 1942–1943. He was also selected for a study trip to China in 1947. He completed his Ph D in Chinese and taught at Cheena Bhavana for some time, went to USA on a scholarship, returned to Santiniketan, and finally joined Oakland University in Michigan, USA.

In an interview published in The Telegraph, in 2012, Amitendranath Tagore provided some interesting insights. First, all five students were provided with a scholarship of Rs. 30, a gift from Madame Chiang Kai-Shek to Prof Tan. Second, Every Wednesday, Prof Tan used to stay mauna (silent). When he spoke in the evening all the students gathered round him, and Mrs. Tan served everybody some Chinese meal, with ingredients from her vegetable garden.

== Courses ==
Cheena Bhavana is the oldest centre for Chinese studies in this sub-continent, and functions as the department of Chinese language and culture of Visva Bharati University. It offers the following Chinese language courses. While the undergraduate syllabus covers Chinese literature (prose and poetry) and a comprehensive introduction to China, the post graduate syllabus goes into more detailed study of Chinese literature, philosophy, politics and Buddhist literature in Chinese. Both the courses lay adequate emphasis on the language and its usage:

- BA (Hons) – 40 seats
- MA – 45 seats
- Ph D

Cheena Bhavana has started a certificate course in Chinese for armed forces personnel at Panagarh military base.

== Library ==
Cheena Bhavana library has a collection of about 44,000 books, along with 4,300 books received as gifts. The library has about 200 users and a daily transaction of 30 books. Renmin Ribao (China's highest circulated newspaper) and 13 China-related journals are available. It has facilities for accessing 120 TV channels directly from China. With its treasure house of rare and valuable books, it is the best of its kind in preserving Chinese books and journals in South Asia.Chiang Kai-shek, the Chinese nationalist leader, had donated rare and precious literature to Cheena Bhavana.Zhou Enlai, Prime Minister of China, presented 12,638 books to Cheena Bhavana library.

The importance and highlights of the library are suitably summarised here: "The Chinese Library in Cheena-Bhavana owes its existence to professor Tan’s herculean efforts. It consists of 100,000 volumes including the Sung Edition (10th Century A. D.) and the reproduction of the CH’ing or the so-called Dragon Edition (1936) of the Buddhist Tripitaka along with many separate volumes of important Buddhist works and a large number of selected Chinese works representing the Chinese classics, history, philosophy and literature. Ten sets of the Shanghai edition of the Chinese Buddhist Tripitaka were presented to the library by the Chinese people of which Professor Tan has presented nine sets to the universities in India. This edition of the Tripitaka contains 1916 different books consisting of 8,416 Fascicles of which most were translated from Sanskrit and the originals are now lost in India. It took about twelve hundred years to translate them into Chinese. The translators numbered more than two hundred, all of them were great scholars, both Indian and Chinese."

== Reviews/ Opinions ==
Cheena Bhavana has featured as a symbol of Sino-Indian friendship in the speeches of India’s national leaders – Rajiv Gandhi in Tsinghua University in 1988, Narasimha Rao in Peking University in 1993, K.R.Narayanan in Fudan University in 1994 and Peking University in 2000, Atal Bihari Vajpayee at Peking University in 2003, and Pratibha Patil at Beijing in 2010.

In 2017, Ma Zhanwu, China’s consul general in Kolkata said in Santiniketan that all school children in China read Rabindranath Tagore as Tagore’s work is part of the Chinese school curriculum. He said that he was happy to know that 117 students were studying Mandarin at Cheena Bhavana.

== See also ==
- Notable people associated with Santiniketan
- India-China relations
