= Dark Energy Spectroscopic Instrument =

Instrument for conducting a spectrographic survey of distant galaxies

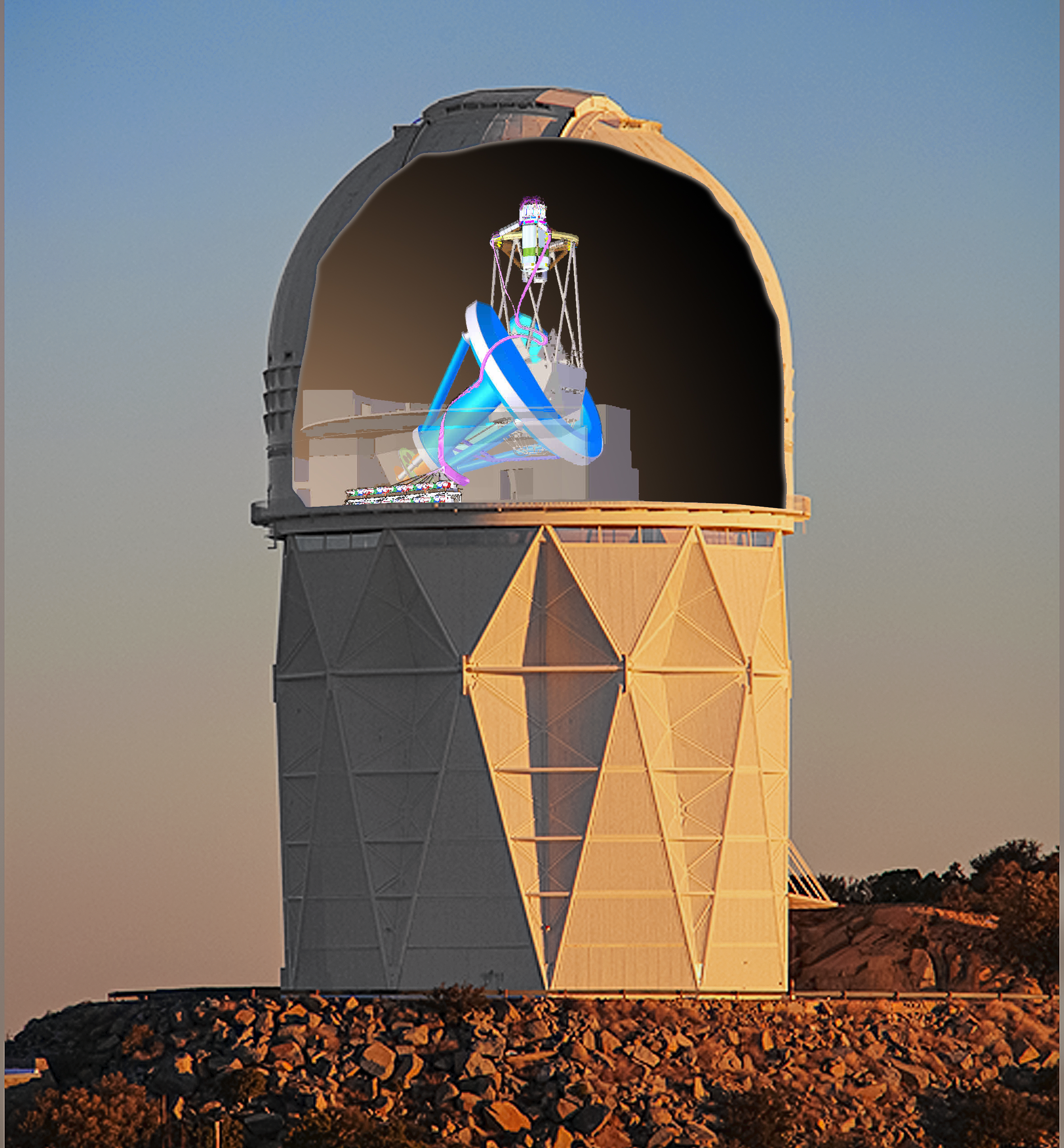
- DESI installed on the Nicholas U. Mayall Telescope at Kitt Peak National Observatory
- Alternative names: DESI
- Location: Kitt Peak, Arizona
- Coordinates: 31°57′51″N 111°36′00″W
- Altitude: 2,100 m (6,900 ft)
- Wavelength: 360 nm (830 THz)–980 nm (310 THz)
- Website: desi.lbl.gov
- Location within the United States
- Related media on Commons

The Dark Energy Spectroscopic Instrument (DESI) is a scientific research instrument for conducting spectrographic astronomical surveys of distant galaxies. Its main components are a focal plane containing 5,000 fiber-positioning robots, and a bank of spectrographs which are fed by the fibers. The instrument enables an experiment to probe the expansion history of the universe and the mysterious physics of dark energy. The main DESI survey started in May 2021. DESI sits at an elevation of 6,880 feet (2,100 m), where it has been retrofitted onto the Mayall Telescope on top of Kitt Peak in the Sonoran Desert, which is located 55 miles (89 km) from Tucson, Arizona, United States.

In March 2025, the DESI collaboration released Data Release 1 (DR1), containing spectra and redshifts for 18.7 million objects observed during the first 13 months of the main survey, making it the largest spectroscopic redshift dataset released at the time.

Analysis of DESI's first three years of cosmological data, published in 2025, strengthened evidence that dark energy may evolve over cosmic time rather than behaving as a constant cosmological constant.

In 2026, DESI completed its five-year primary survey after mapping more than 47 million galaxies and quasars, exceeding its original design goals.

The instrument is operated by the Lawrence Berkeley National Laboratory under funding from the U.S. Department of Energy's Office of Science. Construction of the instrument was principally funded by the U.S. Department of Energy's Office of Science, and by other numerous sources including the U.S. National Science Foundation, the British Science and Technology Facilities Council, France's Alternative Energies and Atomic Energy Commission, Mexico's National Council of Science and Technology, Spain's Ministry of Science and Innovation, by the Gordon and Betty Moore Foundation, by the Heising-Simons Foundation, and by collaborating institutions worldwide.

== Scientific goals ==
An artistic celebration of the Dark Energy Spectroscopic Instrument (DESI) year-one data, showing a slice of the larger 3D map that DESI is constructing during its five-year survey.

The expansion history and large-scale structure of the universe is a key prediction of cosmological models, and DESI observations will permit scientists to probe various aspects of cosmology, including dark energy, alternatives to general relativity, neutrino masses, and the primordial universe. The data from DESI will be used to create three-dimensional maps of the distribution of matter covering an unprecedented volume of the universe with unparalleled detail. This will provide insight into the nature of dark energy and establish whether cosmic acceleration is due to a cosmic-scale modification of General Relativity. DESI will be transformative in the understanding of dark energy and the expansion rate of the universe at early times, one of the greatest mysteries in the understanding of the physical laws.

DESI will measure the expansion history of the universe using the baryon acoustic oscillations (BAO) imprinted in the clustering of galaxies, quasars, and the intergalactic medium. The BAO technique is a robust way to extract cosmological distance information from the clustering of matter and galaxies. It relies only on very large-scale structure and it does so in a manner that enables scientists to separate the acoustic peak of the BAO signature from uncertainties in most systematic errors in the data. BAO was identified in the 2006 Dark Energy Task Force report as one of the key methods for studying dark energy. In May 2014, the High-Energy Physics Advisory Panel, a federal advisory committee, commissioned by the US Department of Energy (DOE) and the National Science Foundation (NSF) endorsed DESI.

== 3D map of the universe ==
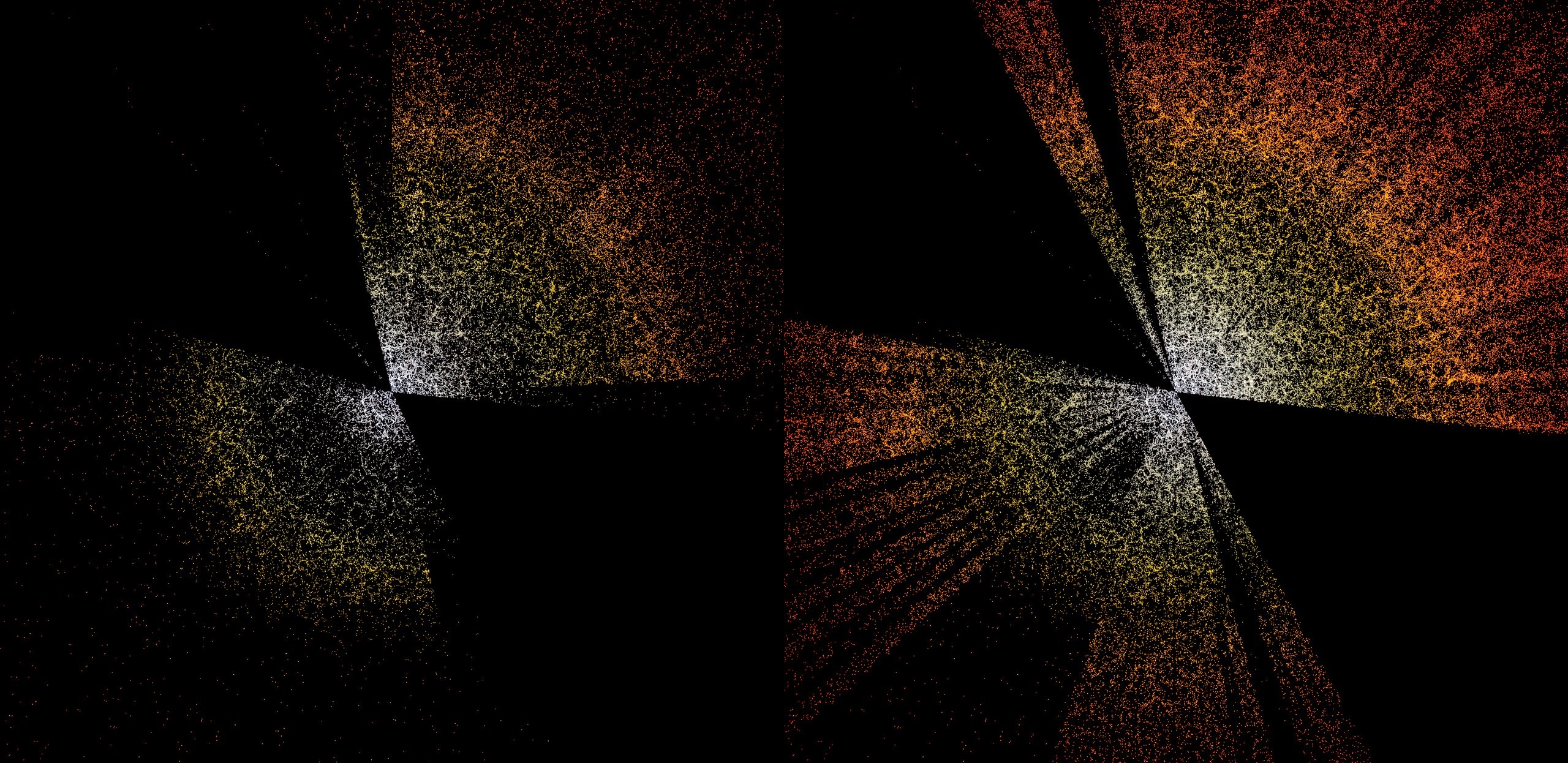
Comparison of the Sloan Digital Sky Survey at left consisting of around 4 million galaxies and quasars taken from 2000 to 2020 and the DESI survey at right consisting of around 7.5 million during its 7 first months starting in 2021 and expected to be completed by 2026 with 47 million.

The baryon acoustic oscillations method requires a three-dimensional map of distant galaxies and quasars created from the angular and redshift information of a large statistical sample of cosmologically distant objects. By obtaining spectra of distant galaxies it is possible to determine their distance, via the measurement of their spectroscopic redshift, and thus create a 3-D map of the universe. The 3-D map of the large-scale structure of the universe also contains more information about dark energy than just the BAO and is sensitive to the mass of the neutrino and parameters that governed the primordial universe. During its five-year survey, which began on May 15, 2021, the DESI experiment is expected to observe 40 million galaxies and quasars.

== Development ==
The DESI instrument implements a new highly multiplexed optical spectrograph on the Mayall Telescope. The new optical corrector design creates a very large, 8.0 square degree field of view on the sky, which combined with the new focal plane instrumentation weighs approximately 10 tonnes. The focal plane accommodates 5,000 small robotic fiber positioners on a 10.4 millimeter pitch. The entire focal plane can be reconfigured for the next exposure in less than two minutes while the telescope slews to the next field. The DESI instrument is capable of taking 5,000 simultaneous spectra over a wavelength range from 360 nm to 980 nm. The DESI project scope included construction, installation, and commissioning of the new wide-field corrector and corrector support structure for the telescope, the focal plane assembly with 5,000 robotic fiber positioners and ten guide/focus/alignment sensors, a 40-meter optical fiber cabling system that brings light from the focal plane to the spectrographs, ten 3-arm spectrographs, an instrument control system, and a data analysis pipeline.

The instrument fabrication was managed by the Lawrence Berkeley National Laboratory and oversees operation of the experiment including a 600-person international scientific collaboration. Cost of construction was $56M from the US Department of Energy's Office of Science plus an additional $19M from other non-federal sources including contributions in-kind. The leadership of DESI currently consists of the director, Dr. Michael E. Levi, collaboration co-spokespersons Prof. Alexie Leauthaud and Prof. Will Percival, project scientists Dr. David J. Schlegel and Dr. Julien Guy, project manager Dr. Patrick Jelinsky, instrument scientists Prof. Klaus Honscheid and Prof. Constance Rockosi. Past collaboration spokespersons have been Prof. Daniel Eisenstein, Prof. Risa Wechsler, Prof. Kyle Dawson, and Dr. Nathalie Palanque-Delabrouille.

The U.S. Department of Energy (DOE) approved CD-0 (Mission Need) on September 18, 2012, approved CD-1 (Alternative Selection and Cost Range) on March 19, 2015, and CD-2 (Performance Baseline) on September 17, 2015. U.S. Congressional approval for the start of DESI as a new Major Item of Equipment was provided in the Fiscal Year 2015 Energy & Water appropriations legislation. Construction on the new instrument started June 22, 2016 with CD-3 (Start Construction) approval and was largely assembled by 2019 with commissioning finishing in March 21, 2020 in advance of the pandemic and marking the formal end of the project (CD-4). DESI was completed under budget by $1.9M and 17 months ahead of schedule. As a consequence, the project received the DOE Project Management Excellence Award for 2020. After a pause for the pandemic and a transition to remote operations, DESI returned to survey operations in December, 2020 with a final checkout and validation phase prior to starting its planned five-year survey. The five-year survey began on May 14, 2021. DESI was shut down for three months in the summer of 2022 due to the Contreras fire which engulfed Kitt Peak. DESI was undamaged and is acquiring scientific data.

== DESI Legacy Imaging Surveys ==
To provide targets for the DESI survey three telescopes surveyed the northern and part of the southern sky in the g, r and z-band. Those surveys were the Beijing-Arizona Sky Survey (BASS), using the Bok 2.3-m telescope, the Dark Energy Camera Legacy Survey (DECaLS), using the Blanco 4m telescope and the Mayall z-band Legacy Survey (MzLS), using the 4-meter Mayall telescope. The area of the surveys is 14,000 square degrees (about one third of the sky) and avoids the Milky Way. These surveys were combined into the DESI Legacy Imaging Surveys, or Legacy Surveys. Colored images of the survey can be viewed in the Legacy Survey Sky Browser. The legacy survey covers 16,000 square degrees of the night sky containing 1.6 billion objects including galaxies and quasars out to 11 billion years ago.

== History ==
DESI received a go-ahead to start R&D for the project in December 2012 with the assignment of the Lawrence Berkeley National Laboratory as the managing laboratory. Dr. Michael Levi, a senior scientist at the Lawrence Berkeley National Laboratory was appointed by the laboratory to be DESI's project director who served in that role starting in 2012 and throughout construction. Henry Heetderks was project manager from 2013 until 2016, Robert Besuner was project manager from 2016 until 2020. Congressional authorization was provided in 2015, and the US Department of Energy's Office of Science approved the start of physical construction in June 2016. First light of the new corrector system was obtained on the night of April 1, 2019, and first-light of the entire instrument was achieved on the night of October 22, 2019. Commissioning ensued after first light and was completed in March 2020, then paused during the pandemic in 2020. DESI started its 5-year main scientific survey on May 14, 2021. DESI is currently operating normally after surviving the Contreras fire in 2022.

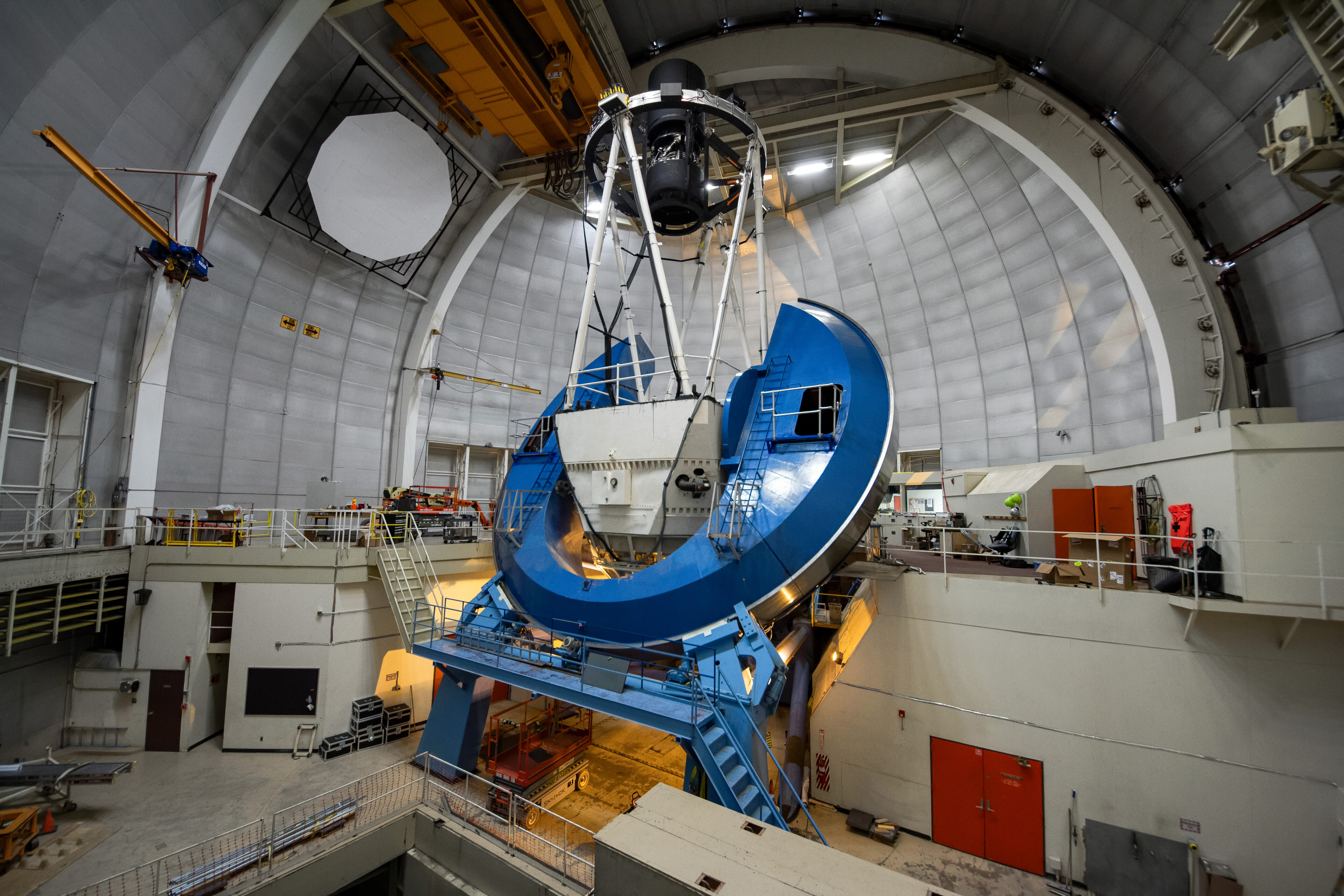
DESI installed on the Nicholas U. Mayall 4-meter Telescope at Kitt Peak National Observatory

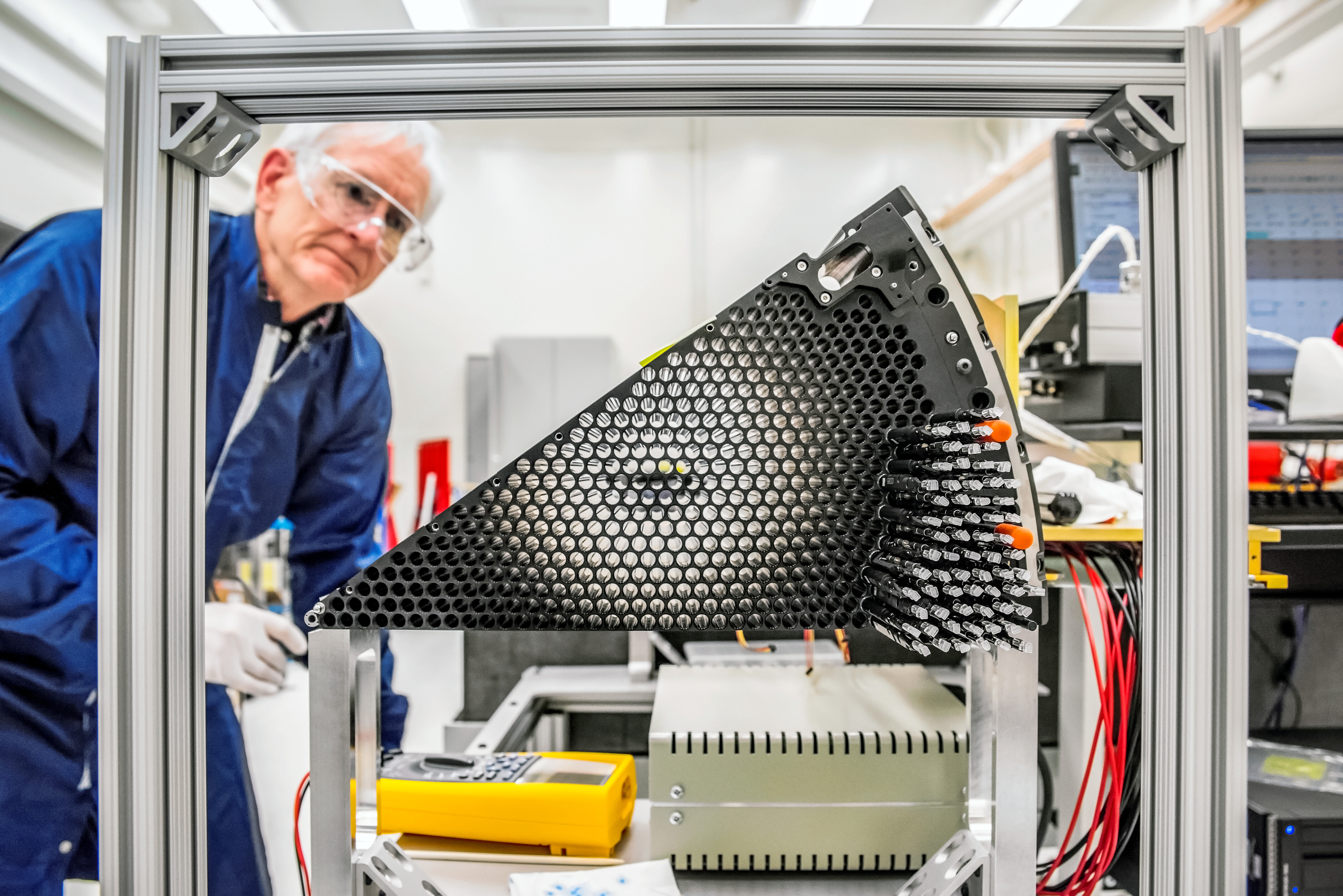
A section of the DESI focal plane

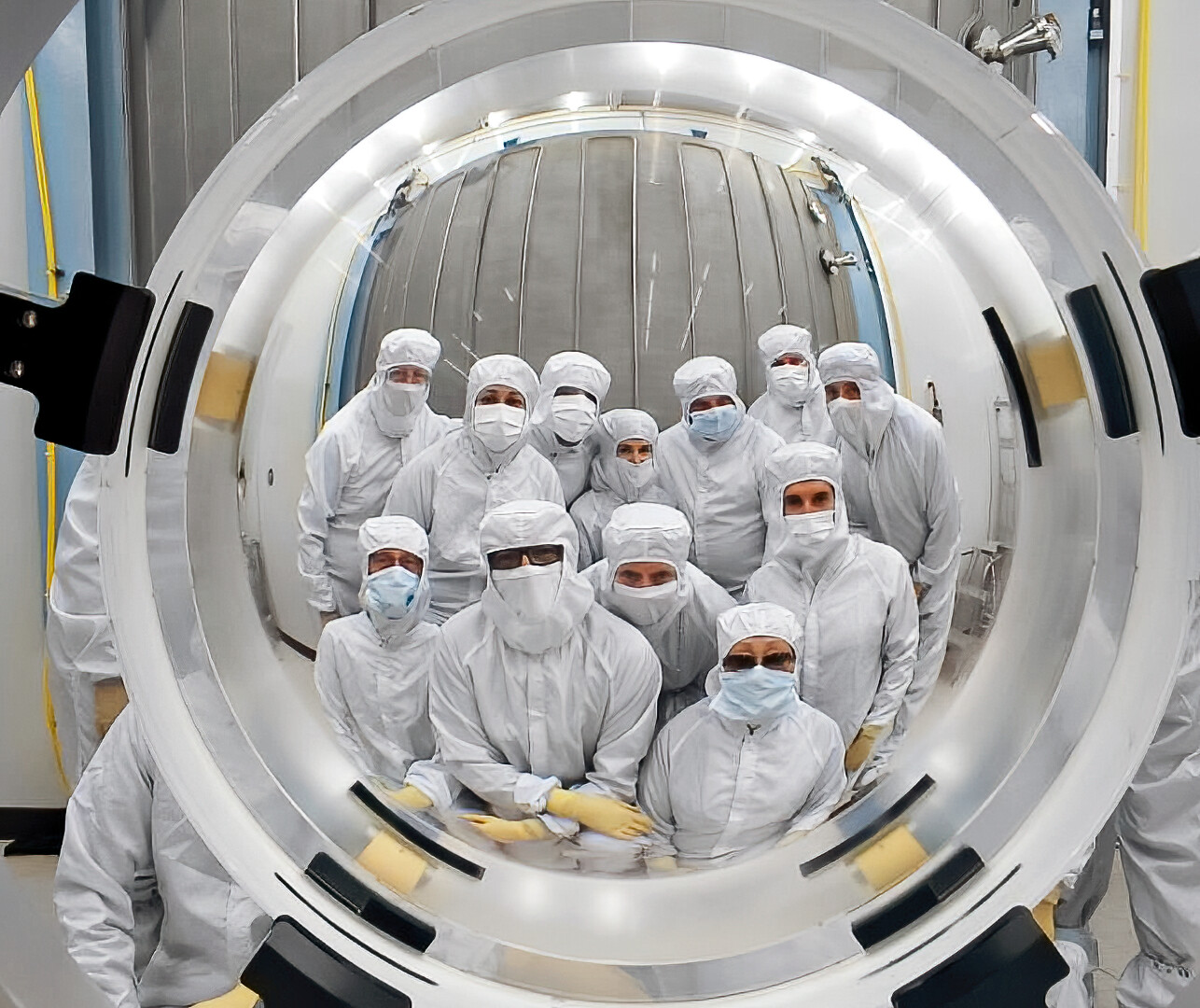
One of four large lenses of the DESI's corrector

== Data releases ==
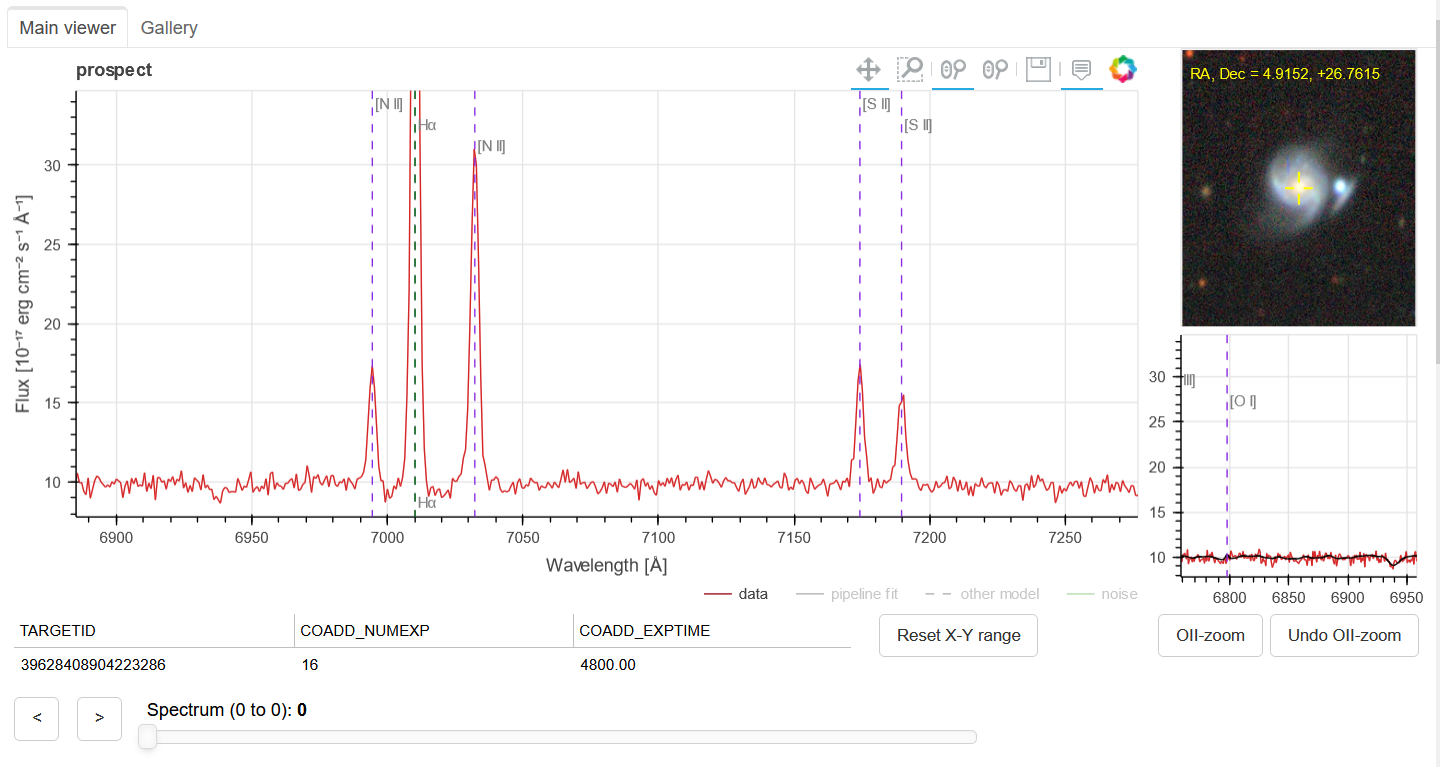
Example spectrum taken by DESI for the Early Data Release. The image shows the spectrum of the galaxy LEDA 1787534.

All of the publicly available data including redshift catalogs, added-value catalogs, and documentation, can be accessed through DESI data portal. Individuals with accounts at the National Energy Research Scientific Computing Center (NERSC) can access the entire public portion of the DESI data. DESI catalogs also exist in a database format. For convenience, a copy of the public databases is also hosted by the NOIRLab Astro Data Lab science platform, and by using the SPectral Analysis and Retrievable Catalog Lab (SPARCL). One easy way to access DESI spectra online is to use the legacy viewer at the DESI Legacy Imaging Surveys. Users have to check the box for DESI spectra and click on an encircled galaxy or star for a link to the DESI Spectral Viewer to show up. The spectrum can be explored in the DESI Spectral Viewer (see External Links under Index| Legacy Surveys).

=== Early data release ===
On 13 June 2023 the DESI Early Data Release (EDR) was announced. The EDR contains spectra of nearly two million galaxies, quasars and stars. One early result of the EDR was announced in February 2023 and described a mass migration of stars into the Andromeda Galaxy. The EDR also revealed very distant quasars and very metal-poor stars. In 2025, a team led by Ragadeepika Pucha of the University of Arizona and the University of Utah reported in The Astrophysical Journal the discovery of the largest number of dwarf galaxies including 2,800 black holes (300 intermediate-mass black holes and 2,500 active black holes) from the EDR.

A thin slice of the map produced by the DESI five-year survey shows galaxies and quasars above and below the plane of the Milky Way. The Universe's large-scale structure is visible in the magnified inset.

=== Scientific Results ===
DESI unveiled its first year of cosmological results in April 2024, delivering the most precise measurements to date of baryon acoustic oscillations and providing evidence consistent with the possibility that dark energy evolves over cosmic time rather than behaving as a constant cosmological constant.

A subsequent announcement in March 2025, based on three years of survey data, strengthened these earlier findings. While the DESI observations alone remained consistent with the Lambda-CDM model, combinations with measurements of the cosmic microwave background, supernovae, and weak lensing indicated that the influence of dark energy may weaken over time.

The largest ever 3D map of the Universe, created by the five-year Dark Energy Spectroscopic Instrument (DESI) survey. Researchers use DESI’s huge 3D map to study dark energy.

The statistical significance of the result ranged from 3.2 to 3.4 sigma depending on the cosmological model and datasets combined, below the conventional 5 sigma threshold typically required for a discovery claim. The physical cause of the possible variation remains unknown.

Data Release 1 (DR1), published on 19 March 2025, contains spectra and redshift measurements for 18.7 million objects, comprising approximately 4 million stars, 13.1 million galaxies, and 1.6 million quasars. The release represented the largest publicly available spectroscopic redshift catalog at the time of publication.

By April 2026, DESI had completed its originally planned five-year survey program, producing a three-dimensional map covering approximately one-third of the sky. The initial survey generated the largest high-resolution three-dimensional map of the universe assembled to that date. Observations continued beyond the primary survey as DESI expanded coverage into additional regions of the sky.

== See also ==
- Dark Energy Survey (DES)
