= Jan Yun-hua =

Chinese language researcher, teacher, and author (1923–2018)

- Born: 15 March 1923; China
- Died: 31 December 2018; Hamilton, Canada
- Occupations: Chinese language researcher, teacher, author
- Spouse: Siu-fung Wong
- Children: Chien, Kang

Jan Yun-hua 冉雲華 (1923-2018), (Ran Yunhua in Pinyin) was a Chinese language researcher, teacher and author. He was associated with McMaster University in Canada. He was best known in Chinese Buddhist studies, more broadly researching Buddhist studies, Chan Studies, Dunhuang Studies, and Daoist Studies.

He was born on 15 March 1923 in China and grew up and spent his early life there. He met Siu-fung Wong, when they were both students. They married and together went through the upheavals of World War II and the Chinese Civil War. After spending their early married life in Hong Kong they settled in Santiniketan in India. He joined the Cheena Bhavana, the Institute of Chinese language and culture, to continue his studies under the guidance of Tan Yun-Shan. After securing his Ph D at the Visva Bharati University, he continued with his research and writing. His sons, Chien and Kang, were born there and started growing up.

His work attracted the attention of the department of religious studies at McMaster University in 1967 and he was invited to join the faculty there. After his retirement in 1988, he continued to work for some time in Taiwan. He died on 31 December 2018 at Shalom village in Hamilton

Among his publications were: Tsung Mi’s Questions Regarding the Confucian Absolute and Chronicle of Buddhism in China 561-960 AD. He had translated numerous Buddhist books.
