= Tan Chung =

Indian academic (born 1929)

- Born: 18 April 1929; Matubahar, Johore, Malaya
- Occupations: Scholar, Sino-Indian relations specialist
- Spouse: Huang I-Shu
- Writing career
- Notable awards: 2010: Padma Bhusan

Tan Chung (born 18 April 1929, in Matubahar, Johor) is an authority on Chinese history, Sino-Indian relations and cultural exchange. He has been a doyen of Chinese cultural studies in India for nearly half a century.

== Early life ==
After initial education in China came to Santiniketan in 1955. On completing his Ph D from Visva Bharati University, taught in NDA, Khadakvasla, then joined Delhi University as professor of Chinese and became head of the department of Chinese and Japanese studies at Jawaharlal Nehru University. His wife, Huang I-Shu, taught Chinese at Delhi University.

== Career ==
Tan Chung taught at Jawaharlal Nehru University (JNU) and the University of Delhi for many years. His father, Tan Yun-Shan (1898-1983), was the founder of Cheena Bhavana at Santiniketan and a key figure driving Nationalist China's interactions with the Indian freedom movement during the 1930s and 1940s. After Tan Chung's retirement from JNU in 1994, he worked as a research professor at Indira Gandhi National Centre for the Arts, New Delhi and currently lives in Chicago, United States. He has been Honorary Director of the ICS/Institute of Chinese Studies, New Delhi.

A conference in his honor, at the occasion of his 80th birthday, was held in New Delhi in December 2008.

== Awards ==
In 2010, he was awarded the Padma Bhushan, the third highest civilian honour by the Govt. of India and the China-India Friendship Award by the Chinese Premier Wen Jiabao in the same year. In June 2013, Yunnan Academy of Social Science conferred upon him the honorary Fellowship of the academy. In December 2013, Visva-Bharati University conferred Deshikhottama (D.Litt. and the highest honor of the university) upon Professor Tan Chung. In August 2018, Sage Published his book on understanding China, China: A 5,000-year Odyssey and has received excellent reviews from leading scholars in the world.
