= Krishna Kripalani =

Indian freedom fighter and author

- Born: 29 September 1907; Karachi, Pakistan
- Died: 27 April 1992 (aged 84); Santiniketan, Bolpur, West Bengal, India
- Occupations: Freedom fighter, author, parliamentarian
- Spouse: Nandita Kriplani
- Writing career
- Notable awards: 1969: Padma Bhushan

Krishna Kripalani (29 September 1907 – 27 April 1992) was an Sindhi Indian freedom fighter, author and parliamentarian. He wrote a number of books on Rabindranath Tagore, Mahatma Gandhi and on Indian literature.

== Early life and education ==
The son of Ramchand B. Kripalani, Krishna was born at Karachi on 29 September 1907. He completed his early education from Karachi and Hyderabad, and graduated from the University of Bombay. He proceeded to London for higher studies. He studied for the Bar at Lincoln's Inn and London School of Economics for history, economics, political science, law and anthropology.

== Independence movement and Santiniketan ==
Back in the country, initially at Karachi in 1931, he started practising law in Lahore. However, he was arrested for participating in the freedom movement which cut short his legal career. At that time, he was interested in learning Bengali. After his release from imprisonment he proceeded to Santiniketan with that objective. Rabindranath Tagore was so impressed with him that he offered him the position of a lecturer in Visva Bharati. Kripalani worked for Visva Bharati from 1933 to 1946.

During his stay at Santiniketan, he met Nandita, daughter of Mira Devi Ganguli, youngest daughter of Rabindranath Tagore and the two decided to marry.

== Later life ==
In 1946, on a personal request from J. B. Kripalani and Jawaharlal Nehru, he joined the Indian National Congress as its general secretary. In subsequent years, he shouldered the responsibility of many other party positions. He was invited to many major international events and delivered erudite lectures on various topics. In 1950, while visiting Japan, he released Rabindranath Tagore: a Biography. Between 1962 and 2011 the book went through 44 editions in 4 languages, and he had authored several books after that.

He was honoured with the Padma Bhusan in 1969. He was a nominated member of the Rajya Sabha from 1974 to 1980. The Sahitya Akademi was established in 1954 and Krishna Kripalani was appointed its first secretary and was there till 1971. Thereafter, he served National Book Trust and Indian Institute of Advance Study in Shimla.

His wife Nandita died childless in 1967. After retirement, he settled in Santiniketan and died on 27 April 1992.

== Works ==
- Rabindranath Tagore – a biography
- Modern Indian literature – a panoramic glimpse
- Gandhi: a life
- Dwarakanath Tagore, a forgotten pioneer: a life
- Rolland and Tagore, a collection of letters and essays, edited jointly with Alex Aronson
