= Martin Kämpchen =

German author, translator, journalist and social worker

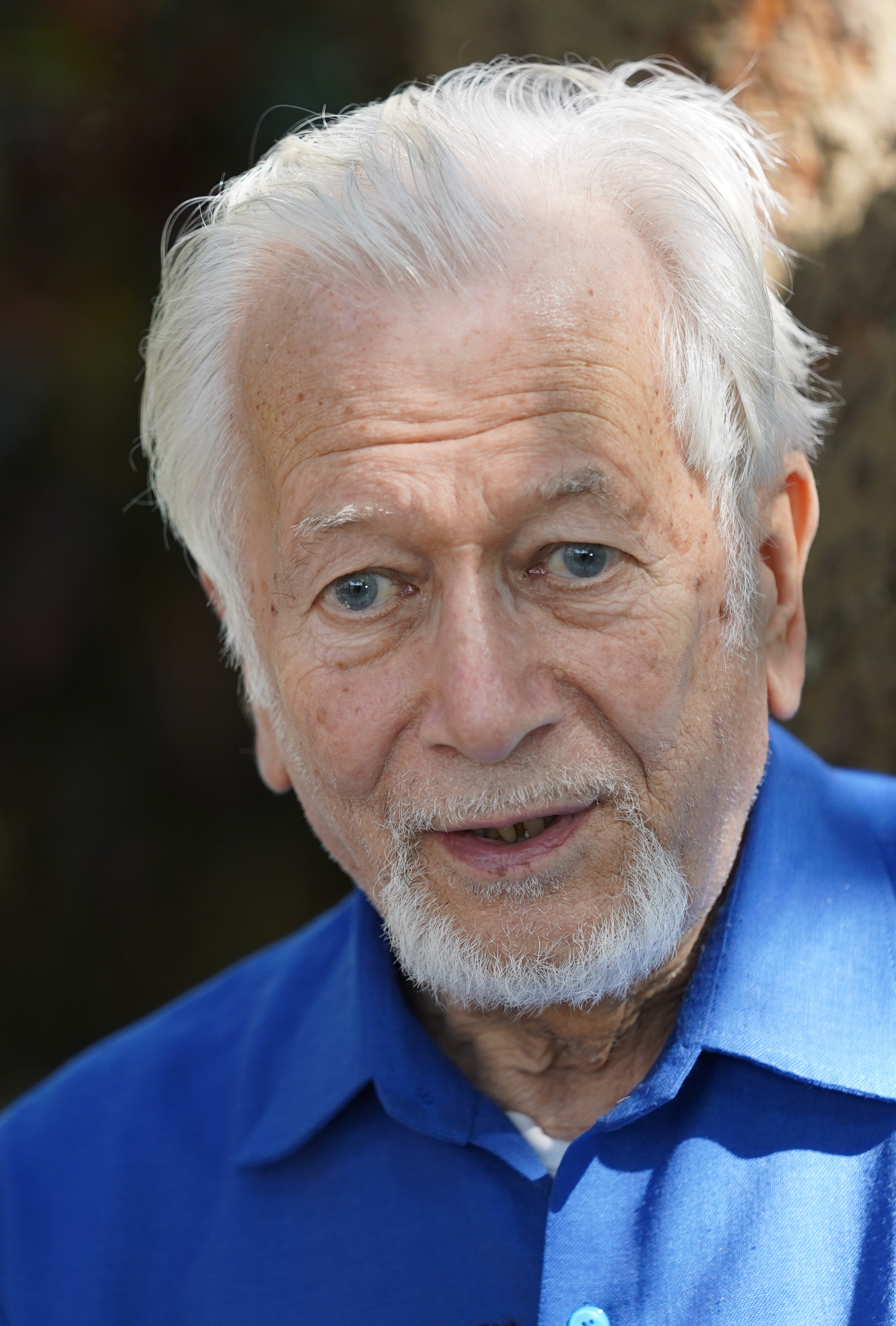
- Born: 9 December 1948 (age 77); Boppard
- Occupations: Author, translator, journalist, social worker

Martin Kämpchen (born 9 December 1948) is an author, translator, journalist and social worker.

== Early life ==
He studied literature in Vienna and French in Paris. He earned his first doctorate in Vienna He worked for three years as a German teacher at the Ramakrishna Mission Institute of Culture at Kolkata. He secured his second Ph D from Visva Bharati University. It was a dissertation on comparative religious study of Sri Ramakrishna, the 19th century Indian mystic-saint and Saint Francis of Assisi, the 11-12th century Italian saint. That brought him to Santiniketan in 1980. He took an instant liking to the place and has never since left it for a long period at a stretch.

== At Santiniketan ==
At Santiniketan, he has learnt Bengali, and has been translating Rabindranath Tagore and Sri Ramakrishna directly from Bengali to German, and Swami Vivekananda from English to German. He lives in Purba Palli but spends time at Ghosaldanga, a tribal village, 8 km from the town. There he has facilitated the establishment of a Santali medium school for the village children. He regularly cycled to Ghoshaldanga and back to Purba Palli. Since 2023, Kämpchen lives predominantly in his German hometown Boppard.

== Translating Tagore into German ==
In his correspondence with William Rothenstein, "Rabindranath later revealed his anxiety about having achieved the Nobel Prize, and with it world fame, with poetic products which were quite inferior to his original Bengali poetry". Kämpchen was also adequately aware of the different mental back-drop of the Bengali and European readers. While the nuances of Tagore's poetry were natural for the Bengali readers, it was much more complex for the European readers. However, what buoyed him was the interest some German publishers, engaged in publishing religious books, had shown in Tagore because in Europe he still feeds on the reputation of being a "mystic" and "sage". After Tagore was awarded the Nobel Prize, the English version of Gitanjali was swiftly translated into several European languages. The German version was published in 1914. Kämpchen had contributed a piece Rabindranath Tagore and Germany: An Overview in the compilation Tagore – At Home in the World edited by Sanjukta Dasgupta and Chinmoy Guha. The introduction says that the article traced the journey of remembering Tagore in Germany through translations.

Kämpchen's translations started with what appeared to be easier poems, but that included some from Gitanjali, which were not easy at all. Santiniketan offered an advantage – there were people ready to assist and support. He studied the translations of Helene Meyer-Franck and Alokeranjan Dasgupta, both of whom had translated Tagore from Bengali to German. There was Ketaki Kushari Dyson, poet, novelist and translator (Bengali to English), whose comment that nobody who is not a poet is able to translate Rabindranath's poems competently had somewhat disturbed Kämpchen. The publication of Selected Poems of Rabindranath Tagore, translated from Bengali to English by William Radice inspired him.

Kämpchen's first publication in German translation was a collection of one hundred poems from Tagore's Sphulinga, Lekhan and Konika. It was followed by a selection of fifty poems, published as a paper-back. The book sold 7,000 copies and created a lot of interest in literary circles and the media. The third volume contained mostly translations from Gitanjali and Sisu. These books were published by publishing houses engaged in publishing religious books. He then came out with a selection of Tagore's love poems, from Insel Verlag. A volume of Selected Works of Rabindranath Tagore was published as part of a series, Winkler World Literature. The compilation had poems, short stories, essays, a bunch of letters and conversations with Albert Einstein. The translations were by several persons and all of Kämpchen's poetry translations were included.

Kämpchen says, "The poet (Rabindranath Tagore) I felt had, finally, arrived in Germany! At long last he was regarded as a figure of world literature on a par with Shakespeare, Tolstoy and Dante."

== Work on Tagore’s visits to Germany ==
Along with his efforts to translate Tagore into German, Kämpchen started working on Tagore's visits to Germany. Tagore had visited Germany thrice and met many people there with whom he carried on correspondence later in life. Rabindra Bhavana archives had material in German, which probably no one had paid any serious heed. Then there were materials scattered across Germany. He spent many years in going through them. When he was working on these, the 50th year of Tagore's death anniversary (1991) was drawing close. Max Müller Bhavan, Kolkata, planned a series of events to mark it. After discussions, they got interested in launching a book on the occasion. A hurriedly produced book Rabindranath Tagore and Germany: A Documentary, edited by Martin Kämpchen was the result. He was awarded the Rabindra Puraskar by the Government of West Bengal in 1992. He later wrote Rabindranath Tagore in Germany – Four Responses to a Cultural Icon, which was more mature and complete. Amongst the many interesting persons Kämpchen met during the period was Alex Aronson, a teacher and author who had written Rabindranath through Western Eyes.

== Other activities ==
Kämpchen is a prolific writer. He has translated the Sri Ramakrishna Kathamrita from Bengali to Germany, Swami Vivekananda's speeches from English to German. Written on Herman Hesse's and Günter Grass' visits and interest in India. In German Kämpchen has published a novel based on his experiences in Ghoshaldanga, has written three books for children based in the Himalaya, on a Santal tribal village and on Kolkata. He has been a free lance contributor to the Frankfurter Allgemeine Zeitung, a German national daily, and other newspapers. Martin Kämpchen was awarded the first Merck Tagore Award in 2012 in recognition of his contribution to Indo-German cultural understanding.

== Books (in English) ==
The Honey-seller and Other Stories. Translated by William Radice. Rupa & Co., Kolkata 1995. ISBN 978-81-7167-293-6

Rabindranath Tagore in Germany. Four Responses To a Cultural Icon. Indian Institute of Advanced Study, Shimla 1999.

My Broken Love. Günter Grass in India and Bangladesh. Compiled and Edited. Viking Penguin Books India, New Delhi 2001.

My dear Master. Correspondence of Helene Meyer-Franck and Heinrich Meyer-Benfey with Rabindranath Tagore. Edited with Prasanta Kumar Paul. Visva-Bharati Publishing Department, 1999; 2nd ed. 2010. ISBN 978-81-7522-229-8

The Hidden Side of the Moon. Musings of a life between India and Europe. Niyogi Books, New Delhi 2014. ISBN 978-93-83098-57-6

Rabindranath Tagore - One Hundred Years of Global Reception. Edited with Imre Bangha. Editorial Advisor Uma Das Gupta. Orient Blackswan, Hyderabad 2014; 2017. ISBN 978-81-250-5568-6

Indo-German Exchanges in Education- Rabindranath Tagore Meets Paul and Edith Geheeb. Oxford University Press, New Delhi 2020. ISBN 978-0-19-012627-8

Don't Let Me Down! Niyogi Books, New Delhi 2022. ISBN 978-93-91125-18-9 (A book for children)

Kites Fly Highest in the Mountains. Niyogi Books, New Delhi 2023. ISBN 978-93-91125-26-4 (A book for children)

We Live Here, You Know. Niyogi Books, New Delhi 2024. ISBN 978-81-19626-32-8 (A book for children)
