= List of vice-chancellors of the Visva-Bharati University =

The vice-chancellor (Upacharyas) is the executive head of Visva-Bharati University.

== Vice-chancellors of Visva-Bharati ==
The vice-chancellors of Visva-Bharati University are as follows.

1. Rathindranath Tagore (1951–1953)
2. Kshitimohan Sen (1953–1954) (acting)
3. Prabodh Chandra Bagchi (1954–1956)
4. Indira Devi Chaudhurani (1956-1956) (acting)
5. Satyendranath Bose (1956–1958)
6. Kshitishchandra Chaudhuri (1958–1959) (acting)
7. Sudhi Ranjan Das (1959–1965)
8. Kalidas Bhattacharya (1966–1970)
9. Pratul Chandra Gupta (1970–1975)
10. Surajit Chandra Sinha (1975–1980)
11. Amlan Dutta (1980–1984)
12. Nemai Sadhan Basu (1984–1989)
13. Ajit Kumar Chakraborty (1989–1990) (acting)
14. Ashim Dasgupta (1990–1991)
15. Sisir Mukhopadhyaya (1991-1991) (acting)
16. Sabyasachi Bhattacharya (1991–1995)
17. Sisir Mukhopadhyay (1995-1995) (acting)
18. R. R. Rao (1995-1995) (acting)
19. Dilip Kumar Sinha (1995–2001)
20. Sujit Kumar Basu (2001–2006)
21. Rajat Kanta Ray (2006–2011)
22. Sushanta Kumar Dattagupta (Sep 2011–Feb 2016)
23. Swapan Kumar Datta (Feb 2016–Jan 2018)
24. Sabuj Koli Sen (Feb 2018–Oct 2018) (acting)
25. Bidyut Chakrabarty (Oct 2018–Nov 2023)
26. Sanjoy Kumar Mallik (Nov 2023–May 2024) (acting)
27. Arabinda Mondal (May 2024–Aug 2024) (acting)
28. Binoy Kumar Soren (Sep 2024–March 2025) (acting)
29. Dr. Probir Kumar Ghosh (March 2025–Incumbent)
