= Ragadeepika Pucha =

- Born: 1993 (age 32–33); Tenali, Andhra Pradesh, India
- Education: Visva-Bharati University (MSc); University of Arizona (PhD)
- Known for: Shape of the universe, Dwarf galaxy, black hole, DESI
- Scientific career
- Fields: Astrophysics
- Workplaces: Max Planck Institute for Solar System Research; University of Arizona; University of Utah
- Thesis: Dwarf Galaxies as Probes of Galaxy Evolution (2023)
- Doctoral advisor: Stéphanie Juneau and Arjun Dey

Ragadeepika Pucha (born c. 1993) is an Indian physicist and astronomer who made important contributions to the understanding of black hole formation and galaxy evolution, particularly of dwarf galaxies. A doctorate in astronomy and astrophysics from the University of Arizona, she is a researcher at the university's Steward Observatory and simultaneously a post-doctoral scientist at the University of Utah. She leads a team of scientists from different parts of the world in the study of galaxy evolution using the Dark Energy Spectroscopic Instrument (DESI) of the U.S. Department of Energy's Office of Science stationed at Tucson. Her breakthrough came in 2022, while a doctoral student and project manager, when her team identified 7.5 million galaxies uncharted before by which the largest 3D map of the universe (at the time) was created. In 2025, her research, reported in The Astrophysical Journal, identified the largest number of dwarf galaxies including 2,800 black holes (300 intermediate-mass black holes and 2,500 active black holes).

== Biography ==
Pucha was born in Tenali, a town in Guntur district of Andhra Pradesh, India. Her father Rajagopal is a retired civil engineer from the Indian Central Government service. Her mother Kanakadurga is a musician and veena (Indian stringed instrument) expert. As her father was stationed in different cities during his service, Pucha attended several schools to complete her secondary education, including those at Andaman, Hyderabad, Ahmedabad, Vijayawada and Lucknow. In 2010, she enrolled in the Visva-Bharati University in West Bengal for integrated master's degree with honours in physics. Her entire university education supported by INSPIRE (Innovation in Science Pursuit for Inspired Research) scholarship (for undergraduate students) from the Department of Science and Technology, Government of India.

Pucha again received the same award three times (as fellowship for research) by which she worked as an intern at the Tata Institute of Fundamental Research (TIFR) in Mumbai, the Aryabhatta Research Institute of Observational Sciences (ARIES) in Nainital, the Physical Research Laboratory (PRL) in Ahmedabad, and the Indian Institute of Astrophysics in Bengaluru. Upon graduation in 2015, she received the International Max Planck Research School (IMPRS) Fellowship and worked as a scientist at the Max Planck Institute for Solar System Research in Göttingen, Germany. In 2016, she got admission for PhD in astronomy and astrophysics at the University of Arizona, and earned her degree under the supervision of Stéphanie Juneau and Arjun Dey in 2023.

== Publications ==
Some important publications of Pucha are:

- Pucha, Ragadeepika; Hiremath, K. M.; Gurumath, Shashanka R. (2016-02-23). "Development of a Code to Analyze the Solar White-Light Images from the Kodaikanal Observatory: Detection of Sunspots, Computation of Heliographic Coordinates and Area". Journal of Astrophysics and Astronomy. 37 (1): 3. doi:10.1007/s12036-016-9370-4.
- Schindler, Jan-Torge; Fan, Xiaohui; McGreer, Ian D.; Yang, Jinyi; Wang, Feige; Green, Richard; Garavito-Camargo, Nicolas; Huang, Yun-Hsin; O’Donnell, Christine; Patej, Anna; Pucha, Ragadeepika; Rees, Jon M.; Spalding, Eckhart (2018-08-20). "The Extremely Luminous Quasar Survey in the Sloan Digital Sky Survey Footprint. II. The North Galactic Cap Sample". The Astrophysical Journal. 863 (2): 144. arXiv:1806.03374. doi:10.3847/1538-4357/aad2dd.
- Pucha, Ragadeepika; Carlin, Jeffrey L.; Willman, Beth; Strader, Jay; Sand, David J.; Bechtol, Keith; Brodie, Jean P.; Crnojević, Denija; Forbes, Duncan A.; Garling, Christopher; Hargis, Jonathan; Peter, Annika H. G.; Romanowsky, Aaron J. (2019-08-01). "Hyper Wide Field Imaging of the Local Group Dwarf Irregular Galaxy IC 1613: An Extended Component of Metal-poor Stars". The Astrophysical Journal. 880 (2): 104. arXiv:1905.02210. doi:10.3847/1538-4357/ab29fb.
- Carlin, Jeffrey L.; Garling, Christopher T.; Peter, Annika H. G.; Crnojević, Denija; Forbes, Duncan A.; Hargis, Jonathan R.; Mutlu-Pakdil, Burçin; Pucha, Ragadeepika; Romanowsky, Aaron J.; Sand, David J.; Spekkens, Kristine; Strader, Jay; Willman, Beth (2019-12-01). "Tidal Destruction in a Low-mass Galaxy Environment: The Discovery of Tidal Tails around DDO 44*". The Astrophysical Journal. 886 (2): 109. arXiv:1906.08260. doi:10.3847/1538-4357/ab4c32.
- Pucha, Ragadeepika; Reddy, Naveen A.; Dey, Arjun; Juneau, Stéphanie; Lee, Kyoung-Soo; Prescott, Moire K. M.; Shivaei, Irene; Hong, Sungryong (2022-10-01). "Lyα Escape from Low-mass, Compact, High-redshift Galaxies". The Astronomical Journal. 164 (4): 159. arXiv:2207.14303. doi:10.3847/1538-3881/ac83a9. hdl:10150/667062.>
- Nidever, David L.; Dey, Arjun; Fasbender, Katie; Juneau, Stéphanie; Meisner, Aaron M.; Wishart, Joseph; Scott, Adam; Matt, Kyle; Nikutta, Robert; Pucha, Ragadeepika (2021-04-01). "Second Data Release of the All-sky NOIRLab Source Catalog". The Astronomical Journal. 161 (4): 192. arXiv:2011.08868. doi:10.3847/1538-3881/abd6e1.
- de los Reyes, Mithi A. C.; Asali, Yasmeen; Wechsler, Risa H.; Geha, Marla; Mao, Yao-Yuan; Kado-Fong, Erin; Pucha, Ragadeepika; Grant, William; Gandhi, Pratik J.; Manwadkar, Viraj; Engelhardt, Anna; Munshi, Ferah; Wang, Yunchong (2025-08-10). "Stellar Mass Calibrations for Local Low-mass Galaxies". The Astrophysical Journal. 989 (1): 91. doi:10.3847/1538-4357/ade4c5.
- Pucha, Ragadeepika; Juneau, S.; Dey, Arjun; Siudek, M.; Mezcua, M.; Moustakas, J.; BenZvi, S.; Hainline, K.; Hviding, R.; Mao, Yao-Yuan; Alexander, D. M.; Alfarsy, R.; Circosta, C.; Guo, Wei-Jian; Manwadkar, V. (2025-03-20). "Tripling the Census of Dwarf AGN Candidates Using DESI Early Data". The Astrophysical Journal. 982 (1): 10. arXiv:2411.00091. doi:10.3847/1538-4357/adb1dd. hdl:2434/1156752.
