= Alex Aronson (author) =

German author and educator

- אלכס ארונסון
- Born: 30 October 1912; Breslau, German Empire
- Died: 10 December 1995; Haifa, Israel
- Occupations: Teacher, author
- Writing career
- Notable awards: Deshikottama (D Litt) from Visva Bharati University

Alex Aronson (Hebrew: אלכס ארונסון; 30 October 1912 — 10 December 1995) was a German-born Israeli author and educator.

== Early life ==
He was born on 30 October 1912 at Breslau, then part of the German Empire (now Wrocław in Poland). As a young man he fled the rise of Hitler, studying comparative literature at Montpellier and Toulouse and then English literature at Cambridge. A German Jew he sought refuge from the impending Holocaust then showing its initial signs in Europe by opting to leave and settle in the Indian village of Santiniketan, in West Bengal, west of Calcutta. On contacting Rabindranath Tagore he was asked to get in touch with Amiya Chakravarty and Charles Freer Andrews, who were in London at that time. Aronson reached Santiniketan in November 1937.

== Santiniketan ==
Santiniketan provided shelter to Aronson during a troubled period the world around. In one of his letters to Martin Kämpchen he wrote, "The hospitality I received there goes beyond all praise. It is something I shall never forget and for which I shall be forever grateful." He plunged into his teaching career, preparing students for the BA examination of the University of Calcutta. He was a voracious reader and tried to understand the Eastern mind. He played the piano and listened to music with Satyajit Ray, then an art student at Visva Bharati. He contributed book reviews and articles for Santiniketan's official journals, Visva Bharati Quarterly and Visva Bharati News. In time, he emerged as one of the most prolific writers from Santiniketan of that period.

With the outbreak of World War II, Aronson suddenly became an "enemy alien" for the British colonial rulers in India. He was sent to an internment camp first at Fort William and then to Ahmednagar. With the repeated intervention of Tagore, he was able to return after two months. However, it was a traumatic experience for him.

Tagore had a vast collection of newspaper clippings that had been collected during his foreign tours. He asked Aronson to put them in order. With many months of dedication and hard work, he classified the newspaper articles and correspondence, and laid the foundations of the archives at Santiniketan. With the wealth of information, he had, Aronson wrote a book Rabindranath Through Western Eyes. It was published in 1943, after Tagore's death. It became an iconic book that has been mentioned and quoted till the present times. Tagore's impact outside India was seen in a totally unromantic, unsentimental and critically sober manner. It obviously did not go down well with the Santiniketan intelligentsia. In 1944, he wrote The Story of a Conscience, a book on Tagore's friend, Romain Rolland. Jointly with Krishna Kripalani he edited Rolland and Tagore, a collection of letters and essays. In 2000, Visva Bharati published Dear Mr. Tagore, a collection of letters from well known writers, scholars and public figures in Europe and America. It was a major archival contribution of Aronson. In 1946, he wrote, Europe looks at India, a study in Cultural Relations. This book on Europe's cultural response to India opened Aronson's horizon beyond Tagore. Aronson taught at the University of Dhaka in East Bengal (now Bangladesh) for two years before immigrating to Palestine after the war.

== Israel ==
After immigrating to British-mandate Palestine, Aronson took up different teaching assignments, most importantly at the Aleph Municipal High School in Tel Aviv, where he taught for many years, having a lasting influence on students such as Dan Miron. After the establishment of Israel and the founding of Tel Aviv University, he joined the English department at this university. In his old age he settled in Haifa. He continued writing – Music and the Novel, two books on Shakespeare, one on twentieth century diaries and three volumes of his autobiography.

== Awards ==
Visva Bharati University conferred on him its highest award, Desikottama (D Litt), in 1993. At the request of the vice-chancellor, Martin Kämpchen went and delivered the Insignia of Desikottama at his home on the slopes of Mountain Carmel, overlooking Haifa.
