= Tan Yun-Shan =

- Born: 10 October 1898; Chaling County, Hunan, China
- Died: 1983; Bodh Gaya, Bihar, India
- Occupations: Scholar, Sino-Indian cultural activist
- Spouse: Chan’ Nai-Wei
- Children: Tan Chung, Tan Chen, Tan Lee, Tan Wen, Tan Yuan, Tan Ajit, Tan Arjun

Tan Yun-Shan was a Chinese scholar and founder of Santiniketan's Cheena Bhavana, the oldest centre of Chinese studies in South Asia. He devoted his life to the cause of Sino-Indian cultural friendship.

== Early life ==
Tan Yun-Shan was born in Chaling County, Hunan province, China on 10 October 1898. He was the youngest child of a Confucian scholar and teacher. He had his early education at home. He lost both his parents early in life. He first went to the county level school and then to the district school. He studied the Confucian classics, ancient and modern Chinese philosophy and literature, the Four Dynastic Histories and select ancient and modern books of poetry and novels. He graduated from Hunan Teachers College at Changsha and then went for post-graduate and advanced studies in both Chinese and western systems. He also had an introduction to Buddhist studies. During this period, he started writing and publishing in newspapers and magazines. He joined some of the same clubs Mao Zedong was involved in at the college they both attended together, including "New Peoples Learning Society" and "New Culture Book Depot".

China was then in deep political turmoil, and as Tan was not a politically oriented person, he decided to leave China and go to Malaya. Tan was largely uninterested in formally joining either the Chinese Nationalist Party nor the Communist Party of that time, or directly getting involved in their complex political struggles, and resolved to move abroad to spread Chinese culture to other countries and other peoples. He taught in various institutions in Singapore, pioneered Chinese literature and wrote in local newspapers. He spent some months in Johore.

In 1927, he met the famous Bengali poet Rabindranath Tagore in Singapore, who invited him to join the teaching staff at Santiniketan.

== Santiniketan ==
=== Setting up Cheena Bhavana ===
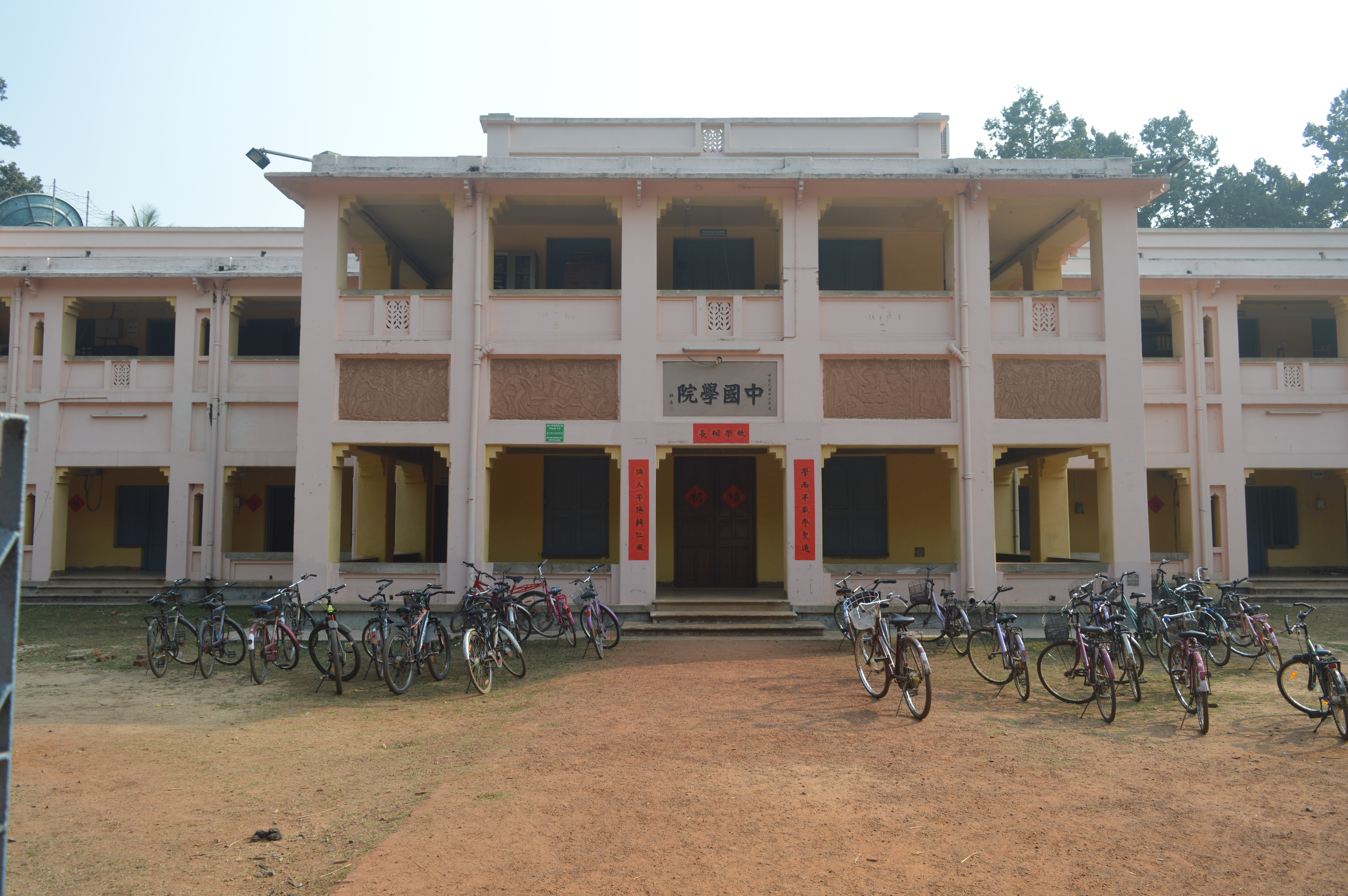
Cheena Bhavana

Tan arrived at Santiniketan in 1928 and joined Visva Bharati as Professor of Chinese Studies. He started Chinese classes with just five students. He himself started learning Sanskrit. He also held discussions with the intellectual fraternity at Santiniketan. He soon realised that his work required a separate hall/ building but Visva Bharati, then a private institution, was short of funds. Tan decided to move around to collect money for the purpose and he took on odd jobs to support himself. He went to Singapore and Rangoon. He accompanied the special envoy of China in his mission to Tibet. The envoy died on the way and so Tan carried his papers and handed them over to the 13th Dalai Lama in Lhasa. He was given a message for Mahatma Gandhi, which he delivered at Sabarmati Ashram, Ahmedabad. He visited the Buddhist pilgrimage centres and after a short stay at Santiniketan, went to China.

Back to China in 1931, he was successful in garnering support for his ideas. The China chapter of the Sino-Indian Cultural Society was established at Nanjing, the capital, and returned to India to establish the India chapter of the society. He went back to China and returned to Santiniketan in 1936 with adequate funds (Rs. 50,000) for his cherished China Hall and 100,000 books (collected with the support of the Sino-Indian Cultural Society). Tagore was thrilled and allotted land in the heart of Santiniketan for construction of Cheena Bhavana. The hall was designed in collaboration with Surendranath Kar and Tan supervised its construction. The building was completed in record time. Nandalal Bose, Benode Behari Mukherjee and others from Kala Bhavana adorned the hall with frescoes and reliefs. Tan planted trees all around the building. On 14 April 1937, Cheena Bhavana, the first institute of its kind in India, was formally inaugurated by Indira Gandhi. Tan was appointed its first director. However, in view of Visva Bharati's grim financial situation Tan refused to take a salary, but the Chinese government provided him an honorarium. Mahatma Gandhi, in his message to Tagore said: "May the Chinese Hall be a symbol of living contact between China and India". Jugal Kishore Birla donated Rs. 5,000 to start research activities. Fund collection continued.

=== Dedicated life ===
With the onset of the Second Sino-Japanese War Tan focussed on the suffering of the Chinese people. Xu Beihong, a leading artist, came to Santiniketan and spent an year as visiting professor of Chinese fine arts. In 1939, at the initiative of Tan, the Sino-Indian Cultural Society organised Jawaharlal Nehru’s visit to China. Tan kept on organising visits of various delegations, important personalities, scholars and students from China to visit Santiniketan, particularly Cheena Bhavana. The Chinese government also responded to Tan's request for a donation. In 1944, Tan collected more donations to add a storey to the Cheena Bhavana. Financial support from the Chinese government continued in various forms. In 1950, the Sino-Indian Cultural Society of China sent a special donation of Rs. 500,000 to Visva Bharati for the construction of a new central library.

In 1942, Chiang Kai-shek and his wife Madame Chiang both visited Cheena Bhavana. They were pleased with the progress of the institution that had already received financial support from China and announced a further donation of Rs. 50,000. Tan also helped in organizing a series of meetings between Chiang and Nehru in India which were of considerable importance to China’s destiny during the war with Japan. Tan had previously helped convey Nehru's support for China in its fight against Japanese aggression, and had also personally written to Chiang to express his own support for the Chinese struggle.

In May 1949, after the establishment of the new People's Republic, Tan decided to bring his family from China back to Santiniketan, uncertain about the future between China and India. There was a "temporary hiatus in cultural exchanges" between the two countries, but it did not last for long. At the same time, Tan’s honorarium from China stopped. The next year, Tan wrote to Mao Zedong regarding efforts to strengthen Sino-Indian friendship as well as resolving the politically delicate Taiwan issue peacefully.

With Visva Bharati becoming a central university in 1951, there was overall development but the ideals of Tagore were not getting due attention. Teaching of Chinese language continued but research in Buddhist texts were neglected, which disturbed Tan. The Chinese government had stopped Tan's honorarium and Tan was persuaded to accept a salary. On the brighter side Cheena Bhavana continued to attract many new scholars. Dr. Luther Carrington Goodrich from Columbia University came as visiting professor of Sinology in 1953–54.

In 1956, Zhou Enlai, the Chinese premier, invited Tan to visit China. Mao Zedong received his friend in the presence of other Chinese leaders. In 1957, during a trip to India, Zhou visited Santiniketan. He came to Cheena Bhavana and donated Rs. 60,000 for a memorial to Tagore.

In 1962, with Sino-India relations deeply strained as a result of border tensions, after Nehru mentioned the Sino-Indian War in his convocation address at Santiniketan, Tan wept openly. Nehru was said to have "softened" and stated that the quarrel between China and India was mostly between their governments, and not their respective peoples. Tan continued his teaching and research work till he retired in 1971.

== Bodh Gaya ==
Tan started working on his new project for the establishment of the World Buddhist Academy at Bodh Gaya. In spite of his advanced age he was once again on the road, collecting money in Hong Kong and Singapore. Funds poured in and the project burgeoned – it was larger than Cheena Bhavana.

In 1983, Tan Yun-Shan died at the age of 85, dying in Bodh Gaya (the seat of Indian Buddhism which had originally drawn him there in the first place).

In her condolence message, Prime Minister Indira Gandhi said, "Gurudeva and my father had affection and regards for him. He identified himself with Santiniketan and contributed immensely to a better understanding between the civilizations of India and China".

== Awards ==
Visva Bharati conferred its highest award, Desikottama, on him in 1979.

The Visva Bharati website writes, "With his remarkably civilised disposition this modest, meticulous and dedicated scholar was universally respected for the tireless and silent contribution in giving shape to Rabindranath's ideal of Visva-Bharati. Tan Yun-Shan will be remembered by the world for his pioneering efforts in re-building the ancient cultural relationship between the civilisations of China and India in modem times."

== Family ==
Tan met Chen’ Nai-Wei at Johore, Malaysia where she was principal of a school and they were married in Singapore in 1927. His wife Chen died in 1980.

- Tan Chung, their eldest son, was born at Matuabahar in Johore state, Malaya, on 18 April 1929. Initially educated in China and came to Santinietan in 1955. After completing his Ph D from Visva Bharati, taught at NDA, Khadakvasla, then joined Delhi University as a professor of Chinese and became head of the Department of Chinese and Japanese studies at Jawaharlal Nehru University. His wife, Huang I-Shu, taught Chinese at Delhi University.
- Tan Cheng, their second son, was born in Changsha, China, on 10 August 1932. He remained in China till he, with his family, came to Santiniketan in 1976. He taught Chinese at Cheena Bhavana from 1979 to 1987, before emigrating to the USA.
- Tan Lee, their third son, was born at Shanghai, China, on 30 November 1934.
- Tan Wen, their eldest daughter, was born at Changsha, on 4 July 1936. In BA (Hons) in Bengali, she topped the class in Santiniketan and in 1964, she completed her Ph D in Bengali, the first Chinese to do so.
- Tan Yuan, their second daughter, was born at Santiniketan, on 5 August 1940. Tagore had named her Chameli.
- Tan Ajit, their fourth son, was born at Santiniketan, on 3 April 1942.
- Tan Arjun, their fifth son, was born at Santiniketan, on 6 August 1943.
- Tan Sidhartha, the oldest grandson of Tan Yunshan and son of Tan Chung, is a neonatal-perinatal pediatrician with over 42 years of experience in the medical field.
- Tan Min, the oldest granddaughter of Tan Yunshan and daughter of Tan Cheng, is the author of "The Last Red Empire," (https://patch.com/california/malibu/last-red-empire-stunning-novel-communist-china-more-nodx) a novel about life in Communist China currently sold at Amazon, Barnes and Noble, and various online bookstores in Europe and North America.
