= Walter Liebenthal =

German sinologist

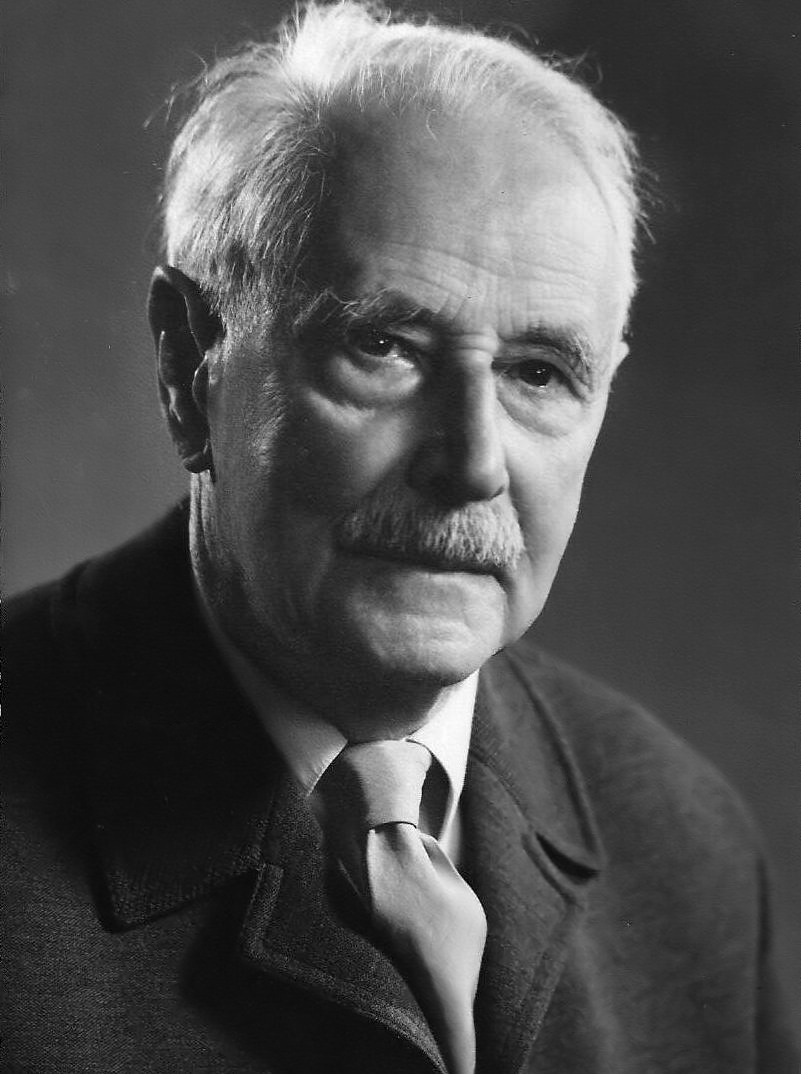
Walter Liebenthal, 1968

Walter Liebenthal (12 June 1886 – 15 November 1982) was a German philosopher and sinologist who specialized in Chinese Buddhism. He translated many philosophical works from Pali, Sanskrit and specially from Chinese into German. Based upon his extensive research in Indian Buddhism and Chinese religion, one of his main conclusions was that early Chinese Buddhism through Ch'an (Zen-) was not a Chinese version of Indian Buddhism, but rather, that it developed from Taoism, a Chinese religion. Indian concepts are present, but at the core it represents a Chinese perspective.

== Biography ==
Walter Liebenthal was born in 1886 in Königsberg, Prussia (now Kaliningrad, Russia), as son of Robert Liebenthal, attorney-at-law, and Grete Becken. He married Charlotte Oenike in 1914 and they had 4 children: Frank, Ludwig, Johanna and Walter.

He had a varied career path. He started to study law, but he soon followed his artistic inclination and became a sculptor in 1907. In 1914, with the outbreak of First World War, he volunteered for the Prussian Army. He was wounded twice and he was eventually made prisoner in France. He spent two years in captivity (1918–1920).

Upon his return to Berlin in 1920, he started several ventures to make a living and sustain his family. Those were the difficult post-war years of the Weimar Republic. With friends he opened a movie theater, then tried to run a chocolate factory, a strawberry farm and eventually he also started to build movie decor. None of these ventures was profitable enough. But his wife was more successful with an embroidery factory for children clothes. She set up a workshop in their house and they could all live on its proceeds. During those years Walter Liebenthal met Paul Dahlke, who had founded the first German Buddhist monastery in Berlin-Frohnau in 1924 and he became deeply interested in Buddhism. He started a systematic study of Pali, Sanskrit, Tibetan and Chinese. Then in 1928, at the age of 42, he began Indological studies at the universities of Berlin, Marburg, Heidelberg, Halle and Breslau. Among his teachers and mentors were Johannes Nobel, Max Walleser and Otto Strauss. In 1933 he obtained his Ph.D. degree from the University of Breslau on the merits of a dissertation on "Satkärya as depicted by his opponents". (see Publications). Upon his graduation, he was not able to get a university position in Germany due to the discriminatory laws of the Hitler regime at the time.

In 1934 he obtained an appointment as a research fellow at the Sino-Indian Institute of Yenching University in Peking, China. Over the next two years he prepared a Chinese-Sanskrit Index to the Kasyapa-parivarta, but unfortunately it was lost during the 1937 occupation of Peking by Japanese forces. In 1937, he joined Peking University as lecturer in Sanskrit and German and followed it to its successive wartime seats in Changsha and Kunming. "On returning to Peking in 1946 he published The Book of Chao which firmly established his reputation as a Sinologist".

In 1952 he left Peking and moved to the Visva-Bharati University of Santiniketan in India, founded by Bengali writer, Rabindranath Tagore, first as a senior research fellow, and later as professor and director of the Department of Sino-Indian Studies until he became emeritus in 1959. On his seventieth birthday, the University of Santiniketan published a Festschrift, with articles from "fellow scholars of Dr.Liebenthal the world over, who warmly responded to the idea of paying him their tribute"

Upon the death of his dear wife Charlotte in 1958, he decided to leave India. He travelled to Europe, gave talks and lectures, was guest lecturer at the Hebrew University in Israel (1959) and later at the Sorbonne, France (1960–61) at the recommendation of his friend Paul Demiéville. Finally in 1962, at the age of 77, he settled in Tübingen (Germany), where he was invited to teach some courses and exercises by the directors of the Indological and East Asian Philological Seminars, Faculty of Philosophy, at the University of Tübingen.

In 1965, upon the recommendation of Ziegler, dean of the Faculty of Philosophy and the support of the Senate of the University of Tübingen, he was named Honorary Professor at the Faculty of Philosophy in his specialty of "Chinese Buddhism". He remained active giving classes, lectures and continuing work "On World Interpretations", his opus magnum until his death in 1982.

"The lengthy and intensive engagement with the religious and philosophical teachers of India and China have led him beyond the reaches of his own specialties to comparative study of the basic themes and thought structure that determine a culture. He has laid down his thoughts on this problem in his writing, "On World-Interpretations" (Santiniketan 1956), which is at the same time a plea for mutual understanding among peoples".

== Professional positions ==
- Sino-Indian Institute, Yenching University of Peking, China, research fellow, 1934–36
- Peking University, China, lecturer in Sanskrit and German, 1937
- Visva-Bharati University, Santiniketan, India, senior research fellow 1952–54, visiting professor of Sino-Indian Studies 1955–59
- Hebrew University, Jerusalem, Israel, visiting professor, 1959
- Institut des Hautes Études Chinoises, Sorbonne, Paris, France, 1960
- University of Tübingen, Germany, honorary professor, 1962

== Publications ==
- "Satkarya in der Darstellung seiner buddhistischen Gegner". 8 vo. 151 pp Kohlhammer, Stuttgart-Berlin 1934
- "Sutra to the Lord of Healing" (Bhaishajya-grun Vaiduryaprabha Tathagata), 32 pp. Ed. by Chou Su-Chia and translated by Walter Liebenthal. Buddhist Scripture Series No.1, Society of Chinese Buddhists, Peiping 1936
- "The Book of Chao". Monumenta Serica, Series XIII 8 vo. 195 pp. Peking 1948
- "Tao-sheng and His Time". Monumenta Nipponica, XI, XII, 34 pp, Tokyo 1955/6, Monograph No.17
- Walter Liebenthal: A Biography of Chu Tao-Sheng, Monumenta Nipponica Vol. 11, No. 3 (Oct., 1955), pp. 284–316
- The World Conception of Chu Tao-Sheng. Monumenta Nipponica, 8 vo. Nbrs.1 & 2, Tokyo 1956
- "On World Interpretations". 8vo. 88 pp. Santiniketan 1956. (appeared serially in the Visvabharati Quarterly XX. 1, 3 & 4; XXI. 1 & 4 during 1954/6
- "Chao Lun: The Treatises of Seng-Chao", 2nd Rev edition, 152 pp. Hong Kong University Press, sold by Oxford University Press ISBN 0-19-643104-2
- "Das Wu-men kuan: Zutritt nur durch die Wand / Wu-men Hui-k'ai". 142 pp. Heidelberg: Lambert Schneider, 1977

Also many articles and book reviews. Among the articles are: "The Problem of a Chinese-Sanskrit Dictionary" (1935–6), " On Chinese-Sanskrit Comparative Indexing" (1935–6), "What is Chinese Buddhism" [in German], "The Problem of Chinese Buddhism", "Existentialism and Buddhism", Yung-chia Cheng-tao-ko or Yung-chia's Song of Experiencing the Tao (1941), Sanskrit Inscriptions from Yünnan I (and the Dates of Foundation of the Main Pagodas in that Province) (1947), "Wang Pi's new interpretation of the I Ching and Lun-yu", T'ang Yung T'ung (1947), Shih Hui-Yuan's Buddhism as set forth in his writings (1950), "The Immortality of the Soul in Chinese Thought. " (1952), "Notes on the Vajrasamadhi" (1956), and "Lord Atman in the Lao-Tzu" (1968). Most appeared in Monumenta Serica, others in Monumenta Nipponica and the Harvard Journal of Asiatic Studies.

== Literature ==
- Liebenthal Festschrift, 294 pp, Santiniketan, Visvabharati Quarterly, Vol V, Numbers 3 & 4, 1957
- University of Tübingen, Pressemitteilung Nr.18, "Prof. Dr. Walter Liebenthal's 80th Birthday", June 3, 1966
- University of Tübingen, article by Prof. Dr. Tilemann Grimm, Attempto 66/67, "Prof. Dr. Walter LIebenthal's 95th Birthday", p. 73, 1980
- Mechthild Leutner, Roberto Liebenthal: "Die Entdeckung des chinesischen Buddhismus. Walter Liebenthal (1886-1982). Ein Forscherleben im Exil", 477 S., Berliner China-Studien 57, Ostasiatisches Seminar der Freien Universität Berlin, Mechthild Leutner (Hrsg.), Lit Verlag Dr. W.Hopf, Berlin, 2021, ISBN 978-3-643-25004-9
