= Gertrude Sinha Hirsch =

Artist and children's art educator (1911–2011)

- Born: Gertrude Hirsch; 15 June 1911; Vienna, Austria
- Died: 5 September 2011 (aged 100); Santiniketan, India
- Citizenship: 1911–1938 Austrian 1938–1962 stateless 1962–2011 Indian
- Education: University of Applied Arts Vienna
- Occupations: Artist, teacher
- Known for: Children's art teacher, lecturer in art, textile artist
- Height: 5 ft 1 in (155 cm)
- Spouse: Kiron Sinha (married 1939–2009)
- Children: 1

Gertrude Sinha (née Hirsch; 15 June 1911 – 5 September 2011) was an Austrian-born artist and children's art educator who spent the majority of her life in India.

== Early life ==
Gertrude Hirsch was born on 15 June 1911 in Vienna, Austria. Her older brother, Leopold, was one year her senior, and the siblings grew up in a close-knit family in the Landstraße district. Her father, Markus Hirsch, was a businessman, while her mother, Margarethe Hirsch (née Rebenwurzel), supported the household through domestic work. As a child, Gertrude was educated in German, Italian, French, and English.

== Art studies in Vienna ==
Hirsch demonstrated a talent for art as a child, and in October 1926 she enrolled in Vienna's Kunstgewerbeschule / University of Applied Arts (now die Angewandte).

Her teachers regarded her as a talented and diligent student. Her transcript states that she had:

"...an exceptional talent for rhythmic creation. [She] had an intense need to engage deeply with the problems of modern creation." (Prof Franz Cižek). "Amazingly industrious, hard-working and full of fantasy—talented." (Prof Viktor Schufinsky). "Special talent in graphics, very favourably predisposed and exceptionally striving." (Prof Dr Josef Hoffmann). "Very serious, very tasteful, she has the strength to complete a given task, distinct sense for line and proportion, good drawing using nature. Tasteful in her use of colour, she is an innovative and sophisticated graphic artist." (Prof Wilhelm Müller-Hofmann).

On 23 June 1936, Hirsch attended her graduation ceremony from the University of Applied Arts. During the ceremony, she was commended for her graphic works and illustrations produced under the direction of Professor Wilhelm Müller-Hofmann.

== Post-graduation ==
During her art studies, Hirsch developed an interest in theosophy and joined a Theosophical Society lodge in Vienna around 1927. There, she began practising meditation and adopted a vegetarian diet.

In August 1936, George Arundale, president of the Theosophical Society, and his wife, Rukmini Devi Arundale, visited Geneva for the organisation's World Congress. Following the Congress, they embarked on an "Eastern Tour" through Europe, commencing in Vienna, where they stayed for four days.

During this visit, Hirsch met Rukmini Devi, who, two years earlier had founded the Annie Besant Memorial School in Madras (now Chennai). Devi was seeking teachers, and Hirsch was offered a position as an art instructor at the school. She travelled to Madras in January 1937.

== Life in Madras ==
Hirsch was employed as an art teacher at the Annie Besant Memorial School in Adyar, Madras, by the Theosophical Society from January 1937 to the early 1940s. While teaching at the school, she met Kiron Sinha, a Bengali artist who had trained at Rabindranath Tagore's Kala Bhavana in Santiniketan, and who was working as an art teacher at Kalakshetra, another institution established by Rukmini Devi. The couple married on 1 June 1939, despite objections from Kiron's father, but with the blessing of Rabindranath Tagore.

In Madras, Hirsch gave educational talks on painting and watercolour techniques on All India Radio as well as the occasional piano recital.

In 1941, Kiron left teaching to work as a full-time independent artist. Hirsch continued teaching in various positions to financially support him, including part-time work at the Training College in T. Nagar, Madras, in 1942.

She also supported her husband artistically, tutoring him in anatomy and in the use of oil paints using notes from her own studies in Vienna. She advised him on perspective, and the couple discussed the work of major European artists. These influences were reflected in Kiron's practice, and he acknowledged her role in his artistic development.

From February to April 1942, Hirsch collaborated with her husband to produce a pair of murals titled "The Rhythm of Life" for the students' common room at the Women's Christian College, Chennai. The murals remain on display.

Their completion coincided with a period of uncertainty in Madras due to fears of a Japanese attack during the Second World War. On 12 April 1942, the Government of Madras advised residents to evacuate; approximately 500,000 people left the city within a week. Dr Elizabeth George, then a teacher at Women's Christian College and later its first Indian principal, recalled:

"Sometimes when I look at these pictures and remember the events of the months when the artists were at work, transforming a blank white wall into a permanent stage, presenting and representing the rhythm of life in full swing, a queer sense of strangeness and mystery hangs over me - for those were days when suspense and fear, uncertainty and insecurity made the College atmosphere almost as tense as the atmosphere in the city and the country at large. But the artists worked on, in those critical weeks of February, March and April, with visible leisureliness except when the hand and the brush could not keep pace with the creative forces at work in them, in executing what the mind conceived or the eye perceived in imagination. Yet they too shared a sense of urgency and they worked for long hours, day after day, week after week, with scanty meals and little rest until they were satisfied that they had made each figure true and beautiful according to the vision in their minds. It was a unique privilege to have been in College during those weeks, for although the finished pictures are now with us always and can be enjoyed at leisure, any day, the drama of the two painters had to be enjoyed while the pictures were still in the process of being created. That drama lives in the memory of those who had the privilege of watching them at work, now perched up on piles of packing cases giving full play to their brushes, now bent low on the floor mixing the paints, now standing together, gazing at the unfinished pictures on the wall and critically comparing them with the outline pictures on the paper spread out on the floor, now lost in thought and seeking inspiration, and occasionally relaxing and resting either on the swing or at the piano."

== Death of her parents ==
On 9 June 1942, Hirsch's parents, who were secular Jews, were deported by train from Vienna to Blagovshchina. On 15 June 1942, they were shot upon arrival. This date coincided with Hirsch's 31st birthday.

== Rajasthan, Lahore, and Santiniketan ==
In 1943, Hirsch obtained a position at Vidya Bhavan in Udaipur, and the couple spent about a year working, painting, and travelling in Rajasthan.

By January 1944, they had moved to Lahore, where Hirsch had taken up a post as lecturer in art in the University of Panjab's Fine Arts Department. The Head of the department was Anna Molka Ahmed, and other members of the department included Esther Kehinkar (teacher), Nazrat Qureshi (demonstrator), and Sheila Prem Nath (demonstrator).

The couple's first and only child, Kamona (nicknamed Bulbul), was born in June 1945 in Mussoorie. This event prompted the family to purchase land in Santiniketan in 1947 with the intention of settling there. For the first two years of Kamona's life, Hirsch and Kiron moved between Lahore and Santiniketan, as Hirsch remained in her position at the university until May 1948, while Kiron began designing and building their house in Santiniketan.

During the tumultuous period of the Partition, Hirsch remained in Lahore and lost many of her possessions, including her Austrian passport and some of Kiron's paintings.

== Move to Shillong ==
In June 1948, the family moved to Shillong, then the capital of Assam (now Meghalaya), where Hirsch secured a government-funded position as Industrial Art Expert to the Government of Assam in the Rural Development Directorate. She worked under Thomas Hayley, Secretary and Director of Rural Development, Cottage Industries and Sericulture and Weaving, and Secretary and Registrar of Co-operative Societies.

Hirsch's work involved travelling to various parts of Assam, where she studied traditional Assamese design from temple carvings and artisans. She collaborated closely with the Assam Co-operative Cottage Industries Association, which was run by Lady Sigrid Emilia Hydari (née Westling), widow of Muhammad Saleh Akbar Hydari, the last British-appointed Governor of Assam. The Association focused on training people in traditional Indian folk art practices, such as preparing vegetable dyes, block printing, spinning, and weaving, in an effort to preserve these crafts. Hirsch worked with the Association to develop designs for weavers and block printers, creating products intended for export.

During their time in Assam, Hirsch and her husband Kiron met the local artist Asu Dev and his wife, Bela, forming a long-lasting friendship. The artists collaborated on several projects, including the design and production of woodblocks.

Hirsch's position in Shillong was disestablished in January 1950 due to funding cuts. By April 1950, the family had returned to Santiniketan.

== Return to Santiniketan ==
After Hirsch and Kiron settled in Santiniketan, they continued to design and carve woodblocks for many years. Hirsch prepared her own vegetable dyes, in addition to using synthetic dyes, to print the woodblocks and produce highly sought-after printed textiles, wall hangings, homewares, and clothing.

In December 1950, the Delhi State Women's Section of Refugee Handicrafts organised an exhibition of hand-printed textiles which included designs Hirsch had produced during her tenure in Assam. The exhibition was opened by Indira Gandhi.

In October 1951, an exhibition of Kiron's paintings and Hirsch's textiles was held at the Institute of Foreign Languages, Davico's, in Connaught Circus, Delhi. The exhibition was inaugurated by Toyberg Frandzen, the Danish Minister to India. In his review, art critic Charles Fabri wrote of Gertrude's textiles:

"They are exquisite, most unusual, admirably executed, and they have been selling on the first day like hot cakes."

It was at this exhibition that Hirsch met Indira Gandhi and became friends with her. Gandhi later became an admirer of Kiron's paintings and Hirsch's hand-printed textiles, purchasing many works for display in public offices and for gifting to foreign visitors and dignitaries. She also inaugurated their exhibition at Freemasons' Hall in December 1952. Reviewing this exhibition, Fabri again praised Hirsch's textiles:

"The hand-printed textiles on view are works of art, and no doubt about it. The blocks are designed and cut by hand by these two admirable artists, Mr and Mrs Sinha, based on folk art and combined into astonishingly original, striking, and attractive patterns. There is marked advance even from last year's work, and the variety of patterns is greater. Nothing like it has been produced anywhere, and Christmas shoppers will lose their hearts the moment they enter this fairyland of prints. The prices are reasonable."

From 1957 to April 1960, Hirsch was affiliated with the Women's Co-operative Industrial Home in Uday Villa, 24 Parganas, Kolkata. The Co-operative operated as a small-scale training centre aimed at revitalising cottage and home industries by developing skills among refugee women from East Bengal. It also served as the design centre of the All India Handicrafts Board and hosted numerous artists and studio potters.

In March 1959, Hirsch collaborated with Californian artist Jane Woolverton—whom she had met in Santiniketan—to hold an exhibition of Hirsch's textile designs alongside Woolverton's paintings at Artistry House on Park Street in Kolkata. One reviewer noted:

"Mrs Sinha's works deserve particular mention as effective examples of printing of woven material. She has adapted exquisite designs from temple reliefs and statues as well as toys and has drawn her inspiration from various folk styles, primitive art and Santal village scenes. For multicoloured designs combination blocks have been used successfully and their application on batik techniques in one piece is of great interest. In her use of a variety of colour shades the principles of colour harmony are carefully observed. A wealth of pictorial suggestions add enrichment to her finished products whose completeness as works of art makes it difficult to think of a happier combination of artist, printer, and dyer."

By 1959, the Sinhas' woodblock prints and textile designs were sufficiently recognised to be featured in the Encyclopedia of World Art. Their works were also sold internationally, including in Sydney by interior designer Marion Hall Best.

During the 1950s, Hirsch managed the household with minimal domestic help. Twice weekly, she walked the 3.5 km from their home in Rattanpally, Santiniketan, to the market near Bolpur Railway Station to buy groceries, carrying them home on her head or with assistance from a local woman she employed. Water was drawn from a well on the family's property, often by Hirsch or her daughter Kamona. The house had no electricity, and Hirsch cooked on a kerosene stove. She had help with cleaning, but ran her textile design studio from home, preparing both vegetable and synthetic dyes in her small kitchen under the light of oil lamps.

== Job in Kurseong ==
In May 1960, Hirsch accepted a position as art mistress at Dowhill School in Kurseong, where she remained for three years.

In July 1962, Hirsch received Indian citizenship.

During this period, Kiron continued to work independently as an artist in Santiniketan, supported financially by Hirsch's teaching positions. With the exception of her tenure in Kurseong, Kiron accompanied his wife to each location and recorded aspects of the local environment and daily life through paintings and sketches.

Hirsch was not only Kiron's wife and principal financial supporter, but also a major artistic influence. Kiron stated that he regarded her as his most significant artistic inspiration and described her as "my inspiration, my muse, my most important teacher and the love of my life".

== Australian tour ==
In late July 1963, Hirsch and her 18-year-old daughter, Kamona, travelled to Australia on the P&O Orient Lines ship SS Oronsay to promote Kiron's artwork through a series of exhibitions. The trip also provided an opportunity for Hirsch to reunite with her only brother, Leopold Hirsch, whom she had not seen for 27 years. Hirsch had emigrated to Adelaide, Australia in 1939. The siblings had maintained regular correspondence, and Hirsch provided Kiron with painting materials for many decades while promoting his work in Australia.

The first exhibition was held from 23 September to 4 October 1963 at the Argus Gallery in Melbourne. J.S. Bloomfield, the minister for education, officially opened the exhibition in the presence of the guest of honour, Jayachamarajendra Wadiyar, the maharajah of Mysore.

The second exhibition was held from 15 to 25 October 1963 at the Dominion Gallery in Sydney.

Hirsch and Kamona returned to India in November 1963. Despite maintaining regular correspondence thereafter, Gertrude and Leo did not meet again.

== Move to Naggar ==
In 1962, Kiron was introduced to Dr M. S. Randhawa, who admired his work, particularly his documentation of local people. Randhawa suggested that Kiron spend time in the Kulu and Kangra valleys to record the landscape and its inhabitants. Towards the end of 1963, the family relocated to Naggar, Himachal Pradesh. By the mid-1960s, Kiron had designed and built a house there. Until the late 1960s, the family spent most summers in Naggar while wintering in Santiniketan. During their time in Naggar, the family developed a friendship with the actress Devika Rani and her Russian painter husband, Svetoslav Roerich.

== Death of Kamona and later years ==
In March 1972, Hirsch and Kiron's only daughter, Kamona, died in an accident in Santiniketan.

In the following years, Kiron's eyesight deteriorated significantly. Until the early 1990s, the couple had limited income and lived in poverty. Their financial difficulties and Kiron's blindness contributed to a reclusive lifestyle. This situation was worsened by a violent burglary on 17 September 1980, in which Hirsch was injured and several paintings were damaged, and another burglary on 25 August 2005, during which at least 18 paintings were stolen.

In their final years, Hirsch and Kiron led private lives, remaining within their compound and relying on local people for food and care.

Hirsch died in Santiniketan on 5 September 2011, a few months after her 100th birthday.
