= Krasso (surname) =

Krasso is a surname. Notable people with the surname include:

- Emmy Lichtwitz Krasso (1895–1974), Austrian-American artist
- Jean-Philippe Krasso (born 1997), German footballer
