= Kiron Sinha =

Indian artist (1916–2009)

- কিরন সিনহা
- Born: 4 March 1916; Khalapara, Netrokona, Bengal Presidency, British India
- Died: 5 December 2009 (aged 93); Santiniketan, West Bengal, India
- Citizenship: Indian
- Education: Diploma in Fine Arts, Kala Bhavana, Santiniketan, 1938
- Occupation: Artist
- Known for: Painting, sculpture, murals, sketching
- Spouse: Gertrude Sinha Hirsch (married 1939)
- Children: 1

Kiron Sinha (Bengali: কিরন সিনহা; 4 March 1916 – 5 December 2009) was an Indian painter and sculptor. He was associated with the Santiniketan School.

== Early life ==
Kiron Chandra Sinha (Bengali: কিরন সিনহা) was born on 4 March 1916 in Khalapara, Netrokona District, Bengal (now in Bangladesh). He was the fourth of five children of Umesh Chandra Sinha Chaudhury, a school teacher, and Niraja Devi, a folk artist.

The family followed Orthodox Hindu traditions. Sinha displayed artistic ability at an early age, encouraged by both his parents. He later regarded his mother as his first art teacher.

When he was about twelve years old, his mother died of cholera. This loss had a significant impact on his life, and in later years he dedicated many of his artworks to her memory. The theme of motherhood subsequently became prominent in his work, with dedications both to his mother and to his wife in her role as a mother.

Sinha completed his matriculation from Baradi High School and College in June 1933.

== Student at Kala Bhavana, Santiniketan ==
One month after matriculation, with the encouragement and support of his father, Sinha was admitted to Kala Bhavana, the art department of Visva Bharati at Santiniketan, to refine his artistic skills and acquire new techniques. During his time there, he studied under artists such as Nandalal Bose, Ramkinkar Baij, Surendranath Kar, and Benode Behari Mukherjee.

In 1933, along with Ramkinkar and other students, Sinha contributed sculptural work to the university buildings Shyamali and Kalabari. He thrived in the environment and later recalled that his work had been commended by Rabindranath Tagore during a 1934 visit to the institution to review students' art.

In 1937, Sinha was awarded a Sino-Indian Cultural Scholarship by Tan Yun-Shan and Nandalal Bose to study Chinese classical painting in Nanjing, China. He enrolled at Sun Yat-sen University as a scholar, travelling with Rabindranath Tagore's signed recommendation, blessings, and a travel allowance. However, within six months of his arrival, the outbreak of the Second Sino-Japanese War forced him to return to India by September that year.

By April 1938, Sinha had completed his studies and was awarded the Visva-Bharati Diploma.

== South India, Rajasthan, Lahore, Santiniketan ==
Upon his return to India in early 1938, Sinha was employed as an art teacher by K. Sankara Menon at Rukmini Devi's institution, the Kalakshetra Foundation. In 1939, he was appointed art master at Vidyodaya Schools, where he designed costumes for school performances and created the school crest that continues to be in use.

During his time at Kalakshetra, Sinha met the Vienna-born artist and art teacher Gertrude Hirsch (15 June 1911 – 5 September 2011), who was then teaching at the Annie Besant Memorial School. They were married in June 1939, despite objections from Sinha's father, but with the blessing of Rabindranath Tagore.

In 1941, Sinha left teaching to work as a full-time independent artist. His paintings from this period included South Indian Restaurant, Collecting Mushrooms, Gallery Tamil Women, Catching Sea Crabs, and Third Class Passengers. From February to April 1942, he collaborated with Gertrude to produce a pair of murals for the Students' Common Room at the Women's Christian College, Chennai. These murals remain in place today.

Whilst Sinha continued to work as an independent artist, Gertrude held various jobs across India to support the family and his artistic pursuits. At each location, Sinha accompanied her, documenting aspects of the environment and everyday life through his art. Sinha described Gertrude not only as his wife and financial supporter but also as his most important artistic influence, referring to her as "my inspiration, my muse, my most important teacher and the love of my life".

In early 1943, the couple travelled and worked in Rajasthan, where Sinha painted Jodhpur Women and Udaipur Women. By January 1944, they were living in Lahore, where Gertrude had taken up a post as Lecturer of Art at the University of the Punjab's Fine Arts Department. During this period, Sinha painted Old Mali and Monsoon Canal.

The couple's only child, Kamona (nicknamed Bulbul), was born in June 1945 in Mussoorie. Following her birth, the family decided to settle permanently and purchased land in Santiniketan in 1947. For the first two years of Kamona's life, the family moved between Lahore and Santiniketan, as Gertrude continued in her post while Sinha oversaw the design and construction of their home in Santiniketan.

In 1946, Sinha was elected an ordinary member of Visva-Bharati.

== Shillong, 1948–1950 ==
From 1949 to 1951, the couple lived in Shillong, Assam (now in Meghalaya), where Gertrude held a government-funded post as Industrial Art Expert under Thomas Hayley, Secretary and Director of Rural Development to the Government of Assam. During this period, they became close friends with the local artist Asu Dev and his wife, Bela. The artists collaborated on various projects, including the design and production of woodblocks.

After Sinha and Gertrude settled in Santiniketan, they continued to design and carve woodblocks for many years. Gertrude used these blocks to create printed textiles such as wall hangings, household items, and garments, which became highly sought after.

== Santiniketan: 1950s and 1960s ==
By June 1951, the family returned to Santiniketan, where they remained for the rest of their lives.

During the 1950s and 1960s, Sinha produced a substantial body of work and held exhibitions in Delhi, Calcutta, Lucknow, and Australia. At one of these exhibitions in the early 1950s, Gertrude met Indira Gandhi, with whom she developed a friendship. Gandhi became an admirer of Sinha's paintings and Gertrude's hand-printed textiles, acquiring several works. These were displayed in public offices and also presented to foreign visitors and dignitaries. She inaugurated Sinha's exhibition at Freemasons' Hall in 1952.

Influenced by the monumental works of his teacher and mentor Ramkinkar Baij, Sinha further developed the use of cement for sculpture, occasionally incorporating coloured oxides. His first work in this medium, Santal Couple with Dog, completed in 1952 in his Santiniketan garden, stands 2.3 metres tall. Over his lifetime, Sinha produced more than 50 large-scale sculptures in his garden.

In the late 1950s, Sinha met the young student A. Ramachandran, whom he mentored and encouraged in the use of oils. They often engaged in discussions on art and contemporary movements, with A. Ramachandran describing Kiron as a "guide" and an "sobering influence". A. Ramachandran sometimes accompanied Sinha on visits to villages in Birbhum where they would paint and sketch the landscapes and depictions of the Santal people in daily life and at work.

In 1957, the painter Shantanu Ukil visited Santiniketan and met Sinha. He was influenced by Sinha's neo-Impressionistic style, bold colour palette, and depictions of the Santal people.

== Naggar: 1960s ==
In 1962, Sinha was introduced to M. S. Randhawa, who admired his work, particularly his depictions of local people. Randhawa suggested that Sinha spend time in the Kulu and Kangra Valleys to document the landscape and inhabitants.

In the mid-1960s, Sinha built a house in Naggar, where the family stayed on several occasions until the late 1960s. During this period, they developed a friendship with the Russian painter Svetoslav Roerich and his wife, Devika Rani. Sinha's years in the Kulu Valley were especially productive, and works from this time were acquired by Randhawa for the Government Museum and Art Gallery, Chandigarh, while others entered the collection of the Birla Academy of Art and Culture, Kolkata.

== Work at Silpa Sadana ==
In September 1968, Sinha was appointed by Visva-Bharati as a designer and teacher at Silpa Sadana, Sriniketan, where he contributed to the development of craft-based art. His work there focused primarily on the design of ceramics and textiles. He collaborated closely with a Japanese ceramicist colleague, who produced thrown vessels based on Sinha's designs, which he later decorated.

== Patron ==
Leo Hirsch, Gertrude's only sibling, emigrated to Adelaide, Australia, in 1939. He and Gertrude corresponded regularly, and Leo supported Sinha for several decades by providing painting materials and promoting his work in Australia.

== Loss of Kamona ==
In March 1972, Sinha and Gertrude's only daughter, Kamona (nicknamed Bulbul), died in an accident. In the following years, Sinha produced a series of paintings reflecting his grief and his vision of Bulbul in the spirit world. These included Bulbul Playing the Mouth Organ in a Tree, Bulbul Passing to the Spirit World, Spirit of Kamona, and Grieving Father.

This loss marked a turning point in his artistic journey. Sinha's subsequent work entered a new phase, exploring Lila, the divine play of Krishna, often depicting Radha and the gopis.

== Later years and death ==
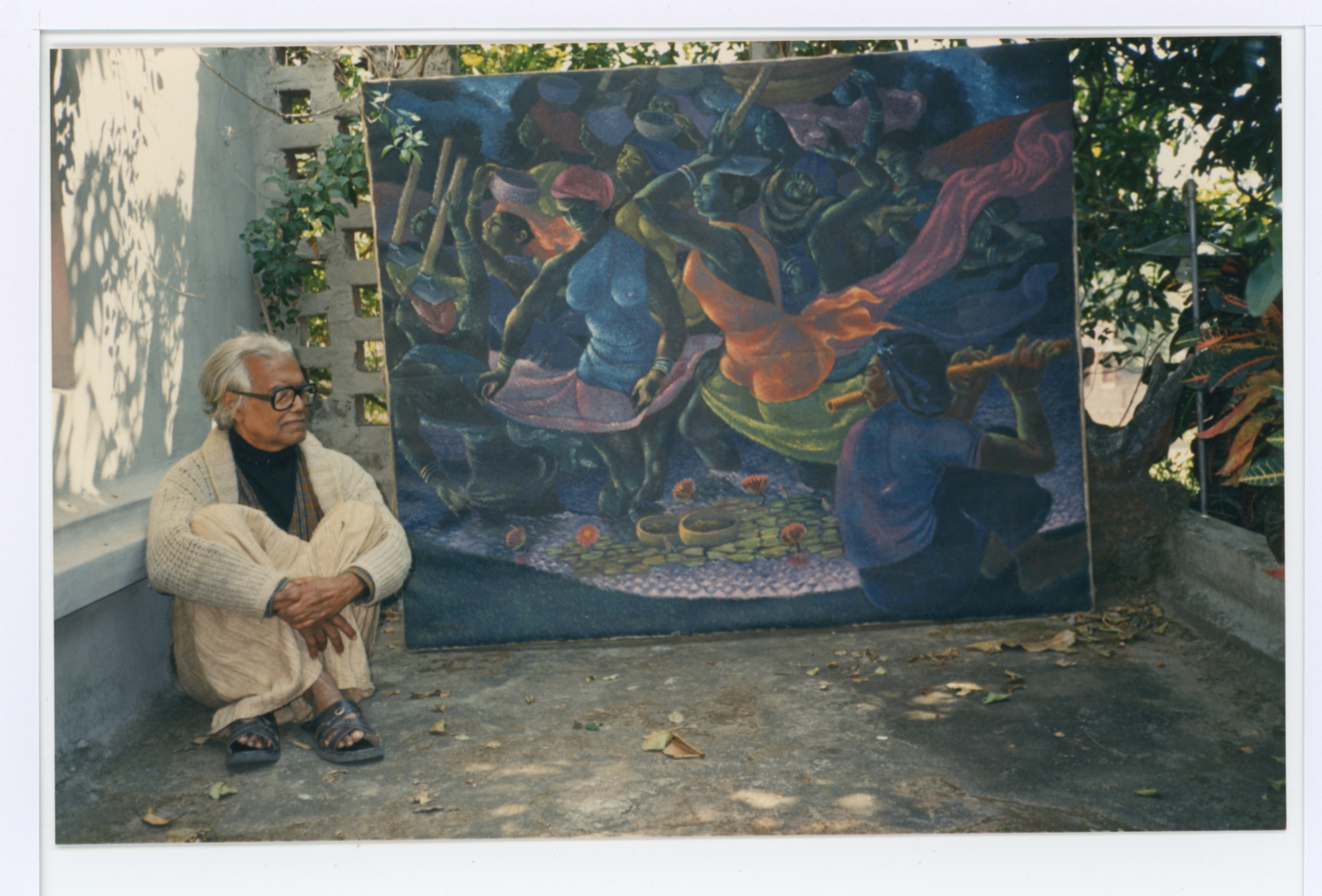
Kiron Sinha, aged 72, in his Santiniketan studio with his painting "Monsoon Melody". Photo by Robert Hirsch, copyright from the Archive of the BulbulArt Collection. Article ID: BAC-10366

Following the tragic loss of their only daughter, Sinha's eyesight began to deteriorate from the mid-1970s. During this period, the couple had little income and lived in relative poverty. Sinha painted on chattis (woven date palm mats) as they were more affordable than canvas. By the late 1980s, he could only perceive light and shade, and by the late 1990s, he was completely blind.

In the early 1980s, he gave up painting and turned to sculpture and cement friezes as a response to his blindness, describing that he could "see" with his hands. Many of these late sculptures were larger than life, featuring Bulbul's face, and were dedicated either to her memory or to Gertrude as her mother.

Their poverty and Sinha's blindness contributed to the couple becoming increasingly reclusive. This was further compounded by a violent burglary on 17 September 1980, in which Gertrude was seriously injured and some paintings were damaged, and another on 25 August 2005, during which at least 18 paintings were stolen.

In their final years, Sinha and Gertrude lived privately within their compound, relying on local people for food and care. Sinha continued to sculpt small hand-sized pieces from cement and oxides almost until his death.

He died in Santiniketan on 5 December 2009.

== Legacy and impact ==
Sinha produced a substantial body of plein-air work in rural West Bengal and other regions of India where the couple lived. These paintings depict the everyday life of village communities in the context of their homes, workplaces, and farms, serving as a visual record of daily life in India during the first half of the 20th century.

His lifelong interest in folk art is evident, with many of his works across decades exploring these themes.

Sinha's works are held in the collections of the Birla Academy of Art and Culture, Delhi Art Gallery, Government Museum and Art Gallery, Chandigarh, and The Prime Ministers' Museum and Library Society. His works are also held at Visva-Bharati University and in private and government collections in Australia, India, the United Kingdom, Spain, the United States, Switzerland, Sweden, Russia, Indonesia, and Germany. Several of these works were presented by the Government of India to other countries.

One sculpture remains on public display in Sriniketan, West Bengal, although Sinha's signature is no longer visible. The three houses he designed and built in Santiniketan and Naggar also remain standing.

== List of exhibitions ==
| Date | Place | Exhibition Title | Comments |
|---|---|---|---|
| January 1944 | Mumbai | Bombay Art Society Annual Exhibition | |
| 17-30 August 1948 | Government Museum, Madras | The first monthly Art Exhibition of the South Indian Society of Painters | Group Exhibition |
| December 1950 | New Delhi | Exhibition of hand printed textiles with designs from folk and tribal art | Opened by Indira Gandhi |
| 21–27 October 1951 | Institute of Foreign Languages, Davidco's, New Delhi | Kiron and Gertrude Sinha: Paintings and Textiles | Opened by Toyberg Frandzen, the Danish Minister to India |
| 15–26 July 1952 | Society of Arts Gallery Institute Building, Adelaide Australia | Contemporary Art Society Adelaide Annual Exhibition | Opened by A. N. Jeffares Group Exhibition. A number of Kiron's works shown. |
| 1–17 July 1952 | Sydney | Contemporary Art Society Fourteenth Annual Interstate Exhibition | Two of Sinha's works were shown. |
| 17–21 December 1952 | Freemason's Hall, New Delhi | Kiron and Gertrude Sinha: Paintings and Textiles | Inaugurated by Indira Gandhi |
| 22–27 October 1953 | No 1 Chowinghee Tce, Kolkata | Kiron and Gertrude Sinha: Paintings and Textiles | |
| 3–9 December 1953 | All India Fine Arts and Crafts Society, New Delhi | Paintings by Kiron Sinha | Inaugurated by E W. Meyer, German Ambassador |
| 16 June – 17 October 1954 | India Pavilion, Central Pavilion (Room 39), Giardini, Venice | Venice Biennale | |
| March 1955 | Jaipur House, New Delhi | Lalit Kala Akademi, First National Exhibition of Art | Inaugurated by Rajendra Prasad |
| 17-15 December 1955 | All India Fine Arts and Crafts Society, New Delhi | | An exhibition of paintings and textiles alongside A. A. Raiba |
| 1956 | New Delhi | | Exhibition opened by Lorraine Rowan Shevlin (wife of Sherman Cooper, the US Ambassador to India). |
| January 1956 | Jaipur House, New Delhi | Lalit Kala Akademi National Exhibition of Art | Opened by Dr Rajendra Prasad, President of the Indian Union |
| 16–18 November 1956 | Bulbul Art Gallery, Santiniketan | | Opened by Visva Bharati, Satyendra Nath Bose |
| 8-16 November 1958 | All India Fine Arts and Craft Society, New Delhi | Saga on the Santals: Exhibition of Kiron Sinha's paintings and textiles by Gertrude Sinha | Opened by Humayun Kabir, Union Minister for Scientific Research and Culture |
| 14 May – 16 July 1959 | Museum Folkwang, Essen, Germany | Moderne Indische Kunst | |
| 4–10 February 1961 | Academy of Fine Arts, Kolkata | Saga on the Santhals | |
| 23 September – 6 October 1963 | Argus Gallery, Melbourne, Australia | Saga on the Santals | Opened by JS Bloomfield, Minister for Education, in the presence of the Maharajah of Mysore, Jayachamarajendra Wadiyar |
| 15–25 October 1963 | Dominion Art Galleries, Sydney, Australia | Saga on the Santals | Opened by Sri G. L. Puri, Indian Trade Commissioner |
| 1–7 October 1964 | All India Fine Arts and Crafts Society, New Delhi | An exhibition of Kulu Paintings | Inaugurated by M. S. Randhawa |
| 1965 | Lucknow | | Opened by Chief Minister Sucheta Kriplani |
| 11-15 December 1966 | Kala Bhavana, Santiniketan | Solo Exhibition | |
| 16-22 January 1967 | Academy of Fine Arts, Kolkata | The Call of the Himalayas | |
| 7-12 November 1968 | Alliance Francaise, Kolkata | | |
| 1973 | Max Mueller Bhavan, Kolkata | | |
| 26 September – 1 October 1989 | Birla Academy of Art and Culture, Kolkata | Artists who Care for Children | One painting of Sinha's was exhibited in this group exhibition |
| 11–13 October 1996 | Devlalikar Kala Veethika, Indore | Hintaal: Retrospective of Kiron Sinha | |
| 19 July - 16 August 2017 | Druck + Galerie, Munich, Germany | Kiron Sinha - Holzschnitte [Woodcuts] | |
| 11 February – 26 March 2023 | Delhi Art Gallery, Janpath, New Delhi | Iconic Masterpieces of Indian Modern Art Edition 2 | |
| 7 November - 2 December 2025 | Gallery Flaneur, Adelaide, Australia | The Art of Connection | |
