= Asu Dev =

Indian artist (1917–1983)

Asu Dev আশু দেব
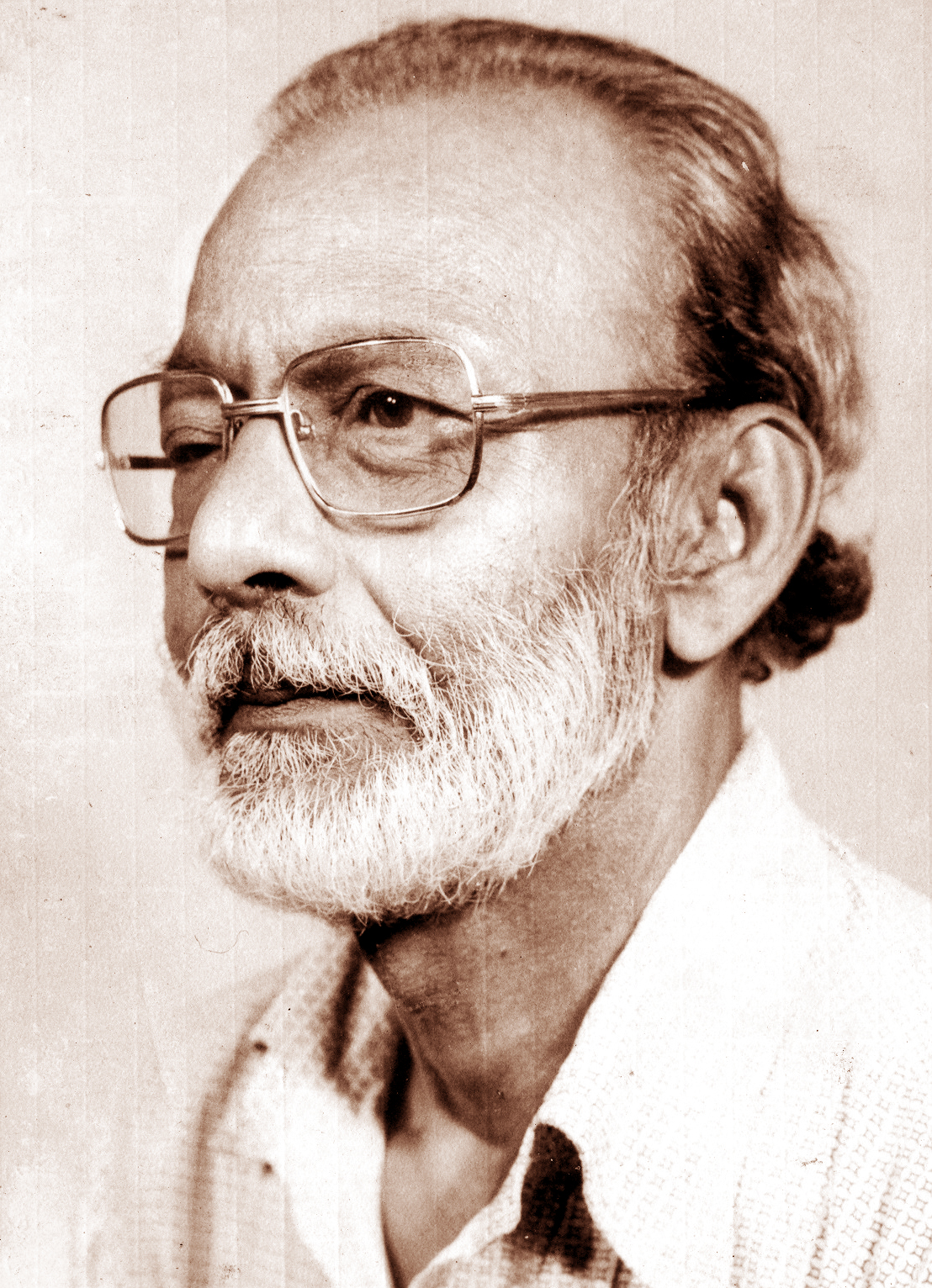
- Born: Ashutosh Deb; 13 December 1917 13 December 1917; Dhubri, Assam, India
- Died: 6 February 1983 (aged 65); Guwahati Assam India
- Education: Cotton Collegiate H.S School, Guwahati
- Known for: Painter, sculptor, art educator
- Notable work: The Wake (1948), Hide and Seek (1964), The Cage (1958), Shadow of Life (1981), Birth of New Rhythm (1981)
- Style: Pointillism
- Movement: Pioneering self taught artist of Assam India
- Spouse: Bela Deb (Palit)
- Children: Anutosh Deb (son)
- Parents: Umesh Chandra Deb (father); Kadambini Deb (mother)
- Elected: Working President Gauhati Artists' Guild 1976-1983
- Memorials: Asudev Art Scholarship
- Website: artofasudev.org

From the signature on his paintings

Asu Dev (আশু দেব), born Ashutosh Deb Dhubri, Assam, India (13 December 1917 – 6 February 1983) was a pioneer artist of Assam. He was a painter, sculptor and an Art Educator. During his lifetime he had worked as a Textile Designer in several Cotton Mills in Jessore and Khulna in Bangladesh, Ahmedabad, Surat, Kolkata, at the Janata College Titabor Assam and Assam Textile Institute Guwahati, Assam and at Weavers Training Centre in Dimapur Nagaland in the later part of his life. His distinguished style of painting, where he had experimented using fine and minute dots often like modern pixels, which was often addressed by art critics as pointillism. Asu Dev was a self taught artist who created his artworks from minute observation of the Nature and the working class, and his innate exposure to Srimanta Sankardeva the 15th–16th century Assamese saint-scholar, poet, playwright, artist and social-religious reformer. The miniature paintings from the Chitra Bhagawata and the traditional folk arts and culture of the region, becoming the prime subjects of his paintings. During his career spanning about fifty years of Artistic career dating to the 1930s, he had created around 180 Art works, mostly paintings, oil on canvas, water colour tempara, textile designs and motifs, illustrations, sketches, drawings and a few sculptures. In 1952, Asu Dev was among the first artists to hold, one man show in Assam.

Asu Dev died on 6 February 1983 in Guwahati Assam India, at the age of 65.

== Early life ==
Asu Dev was born to Kadambini Deb and Umesh Chandra Deb in Dhubri Assam. Umesh Chandra Deb, worked as a :Revenue Shrestadar" (শেরেস্তাদার) in the Office of the Deputy Commissioner Guwahati. Umesh Chandra Deb, was also a research scholar on Srimanta Sankardeva and had published a Bengali publication on Sankardeva in 1327 (Bengali calendar) i.e.1920. Asu Dev was the third son of a family of five brothers and three sisters. Asu Dev studied in the Cotton Collegiate H.S. School in Guwahati, and later took up the profession of textile designer in different Mills in India and Bangladesh. He joined the Assam Textile Institute, Guwahati for some time. Asu Dev's family resided in their ancestral house at Md. Shah Road, Newfield (West) Guwahati 781008 Assam India, till 2003.

== Professional life ==
- Associated as a Teacher of the Gauhati Art School, at Panbazar, Guwahati, Assam, India established by Jibeswar Baruah which was later upgraded to the Government College of Art & Crafts, under the affiliation of the Gauhati University, Guwahati, Assam India.
- Associated with the Gauhati Artists' Guild, a premier Art organisation of North East India since 1976, at Chandmari, Guwahati 781003 Assam India, as a founder member.

== Stage performances ==
Asu Dev had also appeared in stage plays with the local drama groups. His famous plays were Tasher Desh, Mastermosai etc. The performances were staged in Guwahati, Titabor, Tezpur and Shillong.

== Exhibitions ==
=== One Man Shows: 09 ===
1. April 1952: Guwahati, organised by Sarbeswar Chakravarty, inaugurated by Justice Holiram Deka and presided by Dr. B. Barooah at the Kamrup Academy Hall, Guwahati.
2. September 1958: Jointly with wife Mrs. Bela Deb in Shillong, organised by Shillong Rotary Club and inaugurated by Bimala Prasad Chaliha, Chief Minister of Assam at the local Hindustan Standard premises.
3. December 1965: At The State Central Library, Shillong, organised by Indo-Soviet Cultural Society, Assam, and inaugurated by Vishnu Sahay, Governor of Assam and Nagaland at the State Central Library.
4. November 1967: Organised in collaboration with Gauhati Artists’ Guild, and inaugurated by Kamal Narayan Choudhury at the State Art Gallery, Bhagawati Prasad Barua Bhawan, Guwahati, Assam.
5. February 1969: Sivasagar organised by ISCUS – Indo-Soviet Cultural Society, Assam
6. April 1969: Duliajan inaugurated by Chairman, Oil India. Mr. Devkanta Barooah at Club House, Duliajan.
7. December 1977: In collaboration with Gauhati Artists’ Guild, and inaugurated by Kamal Narayan Choudhury at the State Art Gallery, Bhagawati Prasad Barua Bhawan, Guwahati, Assam.
8. May 1979: New Delhi, organised by the House of Soviet Culture In collaboration with All India Fine Arts & Crafts Society.
9. February 1982: Gorky Sadan, Kolkata, organised in collaboration with DRUZHBA & Cultural Department of the USSR Consulate General in Calcutta at Gorky Sadan. Exhibition inaugurated by Purnendu Patri, Film Director & Artist and presided by Artist Debabrata Mukherjee.

=== Group shows: 13 ===
1. December 1952: 17th Annual All India Exhibition of Fine Arts Academy at the Indian Museum, Chowringhee, Kolkata
2. December 1955: Academy of Fine Arts, Kolkata
3. February 1966: Organised by the Indian Progressive Writers Association at District Library, Guwahati.
4. March 1971: Organised by Assam Academy for Cultural Relations at Cotton College Union Hall, Guwahati.
5. June 1973: World Youth Festival (Assam State Youth Festival) in Guwahati
6. April 1975: State Art Gallery, Guwahati, organised by Directorate of Cultural Affairs, Government of Assam.
7. May 1975: State Art Gallery, Guwahati, organised by the Assam Fine Arts & Crafts Society, Guwahati.
8. January 1976: State Art Gallery, Guwahati, organised by the Assam Fine Arts & Crafts Society, Guwahati.
9. August 1976: Rabindra Bhawan, Guwahati, organised by Directorate of Cultural Affairs, Government of Assam.
10. July 1978: State Art Gallery, Guwahati, organised by Gauhati Artists’Guild. Gauhati
11. April 1979: State Art Gallery, Guwahati, organised by Gauhati Artists’Guild. Gauhati
12. September 1980: State Art Gallery, Guwahati, organised by Directorate of Cultural Affairs, Government of Assam.
13. September 1982: State Art Gallery, Guwahati, organised by Assam Progressive Writers, and Artists, Association on the occasion of Third State Conference and inaugurated by Purnendu Patri, Film Director & Artist.

=== Retrospective Exhibitions (post 1983) ===
1983 & 1989: State Art Gallery Guwahati organised by The Directorate of Cultural Affairs, Government of Assam India, and Gauhati Artists' Guild Guwahati in collaboration with Asu Dev's family.

2007: Held at Srimanta Sankardeva Kalakshetra Guwahati, Assam India, in collaboration with Asu Dev's family.

2017: The Centenary Retrospective was held at Gallery 1 & 2 Gauhati Artists Guild, Guwahati, Assam India. Organised by Gauhati Artists' Guild in collaboration with Asudev Art Foundation.

== Collection of Paintings ==
=== Asu Dev's paintings collected by organisations ===
- Asudev Art Foundation (a non-profit trust of Asu Dev's family) Guwahati Assam India
- AAFTAA, Guwahati Assam India
- Assam Oil Division, Assam, India (Paintings collected: 12)
- Assam State Museum, Guwahati, Assam India (Paintings collected: 02)
- Birla Industries, Kolkata, India (Paintings collected: 01)
- Consulates of Chekoslovakia, Bulgaria, Yugoslavia, Romania and Soviet Union in New Delhi, India
- Directorate of Cultural Affairs, Government of Assam, for State Art Gallery, Guwahati Assam India. (Paintings collected: 03)
- Gauhati Artists’ Guild, Guwahati, Assam India (Paintings collected: 01)
- Government of Meghalaya (Paintings collected: ?)
- Gauhati University Library, Guwahati, Assam India (Paintings collected: 01)
- Handique Girls College, Guwahati, Assam India (Paintings collected: 01)
- House of Soviet Culture, New Delhi, India (Paintings collected: 06)
- Oil India Limited, Duliajan, Sibsagar Assam India (Paintings collected: 10)

=== Asu Dev's paintings collected by private collectors ===
Private Collectors in India: Bengaluru, Duliajan, Sibsagar, Guwahati, Kolkata, Mumbai, Dimapur, New Delhi, Shillong, Thiruvananthapuram (Trivandrum)

Private Collectors outside India: Soviet Union, U.K and USA

== Family ==
Asu Dev married Bela Deb (বেলা দেব) (Bela Palit) on 5 June 1951, in Shillong, then Assam. Bela Deb was educated in Patha Bhavana, Kalabhavana and Sangeet Bhavana, Visvabharati Santiniketan West Bengal India and joined the Assam Textile Institute, Guwahati Assam India, as a Textile Designer and retired in the same post in 1991.

Asu Dev's only son, Anutosh Deb, is a Graduate in Applied Arts from the Faculty of Fine Arts, Maharaja Sayajirao University of Baroda, Gujarat India. He served as an Art Educator with Kendriya Vidyalaya Sangathan an Autonomous Organisation under the Ministry of Education, Government of India for over 28 years until his superannuation in January 2024, and is presently residing in Guwahati. In August 2026, Anutosh Deb has published two volumes of “Memoirs: Photography: An Obsession Personified”. These books present an aesthetically rich reflection of Anutosh’s uninterrupted forty-year journey as a photographer. They may be regarded as significant additions to the photographic literature of this region.

Asu Dev's daughter in law, Tulirekha Deb, is a graduate in Fine Arts (Painting) from Kala Bhavana Viswabharati Santiniketan, West Bengal, and is an Art Educator presently working with Royal Global School, Guwahati Assam India. Asu Dev's grand daughter Anurekha Deb, is a Masters in Visual Arts from Shiv Nadar University, Gautam Budh Nagar, Uttar Pradesh, India, after graduating in Painting from the Faculty of Fine Arts, Maharaja Sayajirao University of Baroda, Gujarat India. She has also completed a Post Graduate in Acting and Devising, Drama and Dramatics & Theatre Arts from the Drama School Mumbai.

== Felicitations ==
1982: 25th Rongali Bihu Celebrations, Guwahati Bihu Sanmilani, Latasil, Guwahati Assam India

== Death ==
Asu Dev was hospitalized when he felt some discomfort and complained of chest pain, and was admitted in the Gauhati Nursing Home, Bharalumukh, Guwahati Assam at 9 PM on the night of 5 February 1983. He expired due to a sudden cardiac arrest at 6:35 AM on 6 February 1983. He was cremated as per the Hindu rites at the Bhoothnath Crematorium, Guwahati. His funeral was attended by family members, fellow Artists, students, and well wishers. Asu Dev was 65 at the time of his demise.

== Asu Dev Art Scholarship ==
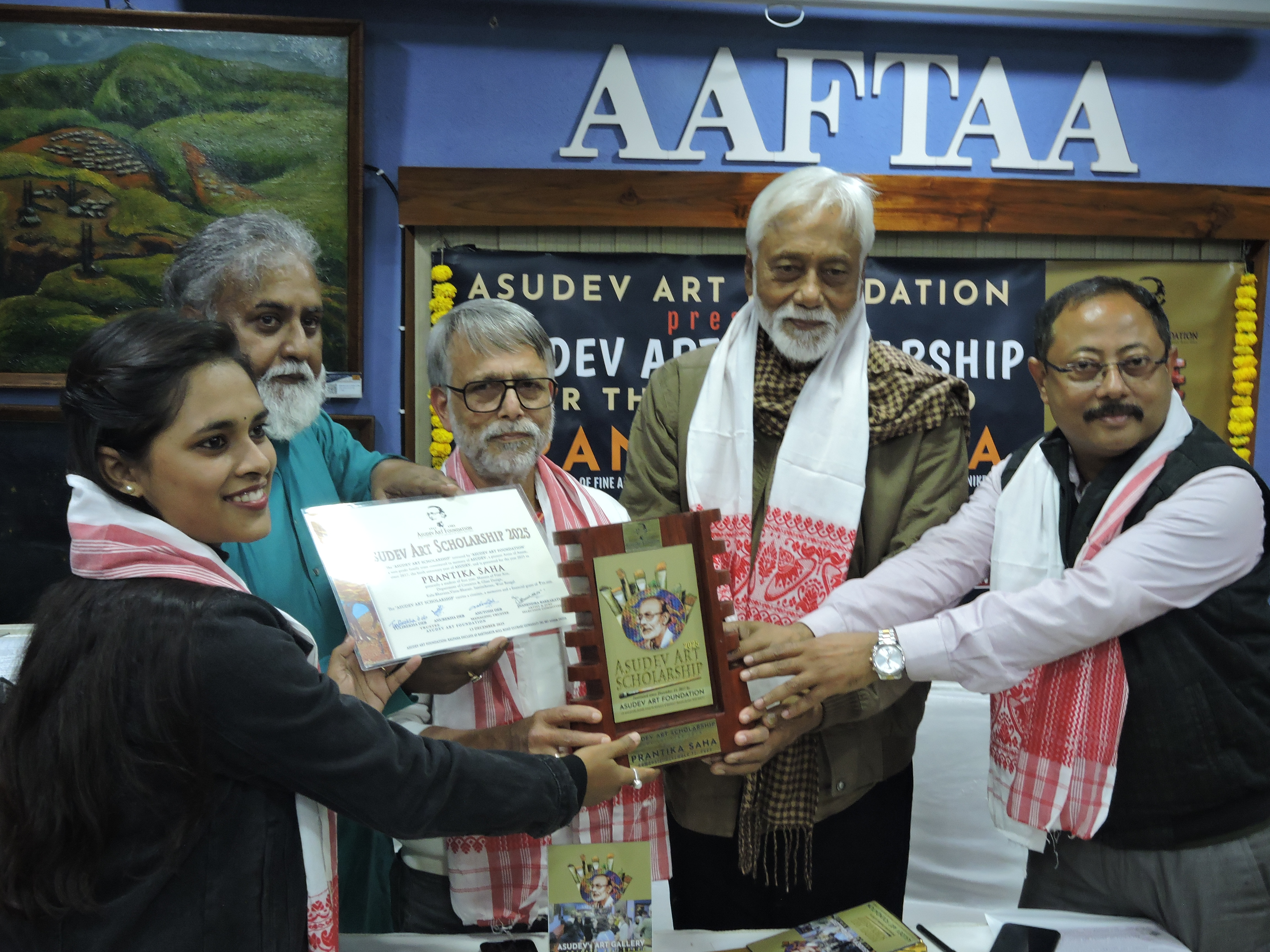
Prantika Saha receiving the Asu Dev Art Scholarship 2025

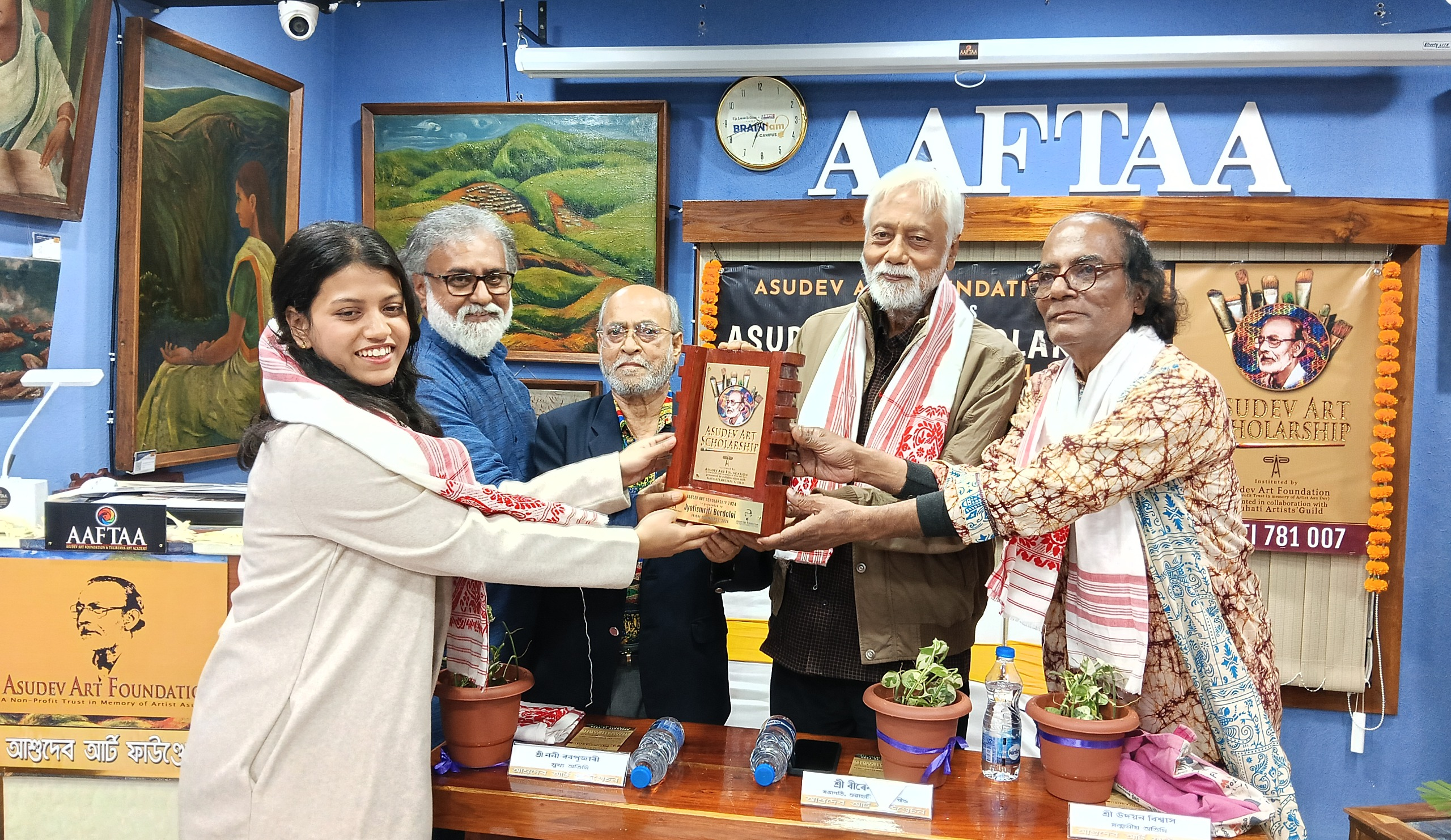
Jyotismriti Bordoloi receiving the Asu Dev Art Scholarship 2024 on 13 December 2024 at Asu Dev Art Foundation, Guwahati Assam India

The Asu Dev Art Scholarship has been initiated by the family members of ASU DEV from the centenary year in 2017, through their non-profit family trust Asudev Art Foundation registered as a family trust in 2016. The annual art scholarship awards one student under 28 years of age, a domicile of Assam, and pursuing Master in Fine Arts in painting, sculpture, graphics, design and applied arts and is enrolled as a regular student in any UGC & Government of India recognized Fine Art College/University in India, outside the State of Assam.

The Asu Dev Art Scholarship carries a memento, a citation/certificate and one time financial grant of ₹50,000 only through family contribution, through the process of application and selection by a constituted jury nominated by the Trustees of the Asu Dev Art Foundation. The period of online application opens on August 15, and closes on September 20, every year. The Asudev Art Scholarship is presented annually on December 13, the birth anniversary of Asu Dev in the premises of AAFTAA, Guwahati.

=== Awardees ===
2025: Prantika Saha

2024: Jyotismriti Bordoloi

2018: Debangona Paul

2017:Seemanta Bhagawati

== Asu Dev Centenary Retrospective 2017 ==
The Asu Dev Centenary Retrospective 2017 was organised by Gauhati Artists' Guild in collaboration with Asu Dev Art Foundation, from 13 December to 27 December 2017 in Gallery 1 & 2 of Gauhati Artists Guild, Guwahati Assam India. The First Asudev Art Scholarship was also presented to Seemanta Bhagawati a final year student of Kala Bhavana Santiniketan pursuing MFA Graphics.

== Gallery ==
Some of Asu Dev's notable works include early water colour tempara with pixel effects:

- The Wake (1948)
- The Cage (1958)
- Harijan (1966)
- Humanity Uprooted (1968)
- Symphony (1973)
- Life Moves on (1973)
- Night Awake (1978)
- The Contenders (1978)
- The Hunt (1978)
- Birth of a New Rhythm (1981)
- Shadow of Life (1981)

The few oil on canvas paintings (featuring bold strokes and dabs) also documented and photographed at Asu Dev Art Foundation include:

- The Birth of a new life (1962)
- Virginity (1964)
- On the way to work (1964)
- The Silent flutter (1965)
- My Comrade (1966)
- A lazy evening on the Brahmaputra (1966)

A permanent gallery has been set up privately by the family for display of Asu Dev's artworks, and is open for public viewing on appointment. The gallery is situated at Kalpana Enclave, House No. 45, Barthakur Mill Road Ulubari Guwahati 781007 Assam, India.
