= Lichtwitz =

Lichtwitz is a surname. Notable people with the surname include:

- Leopold Lichtwitz (1876–1943), German-American internist
- Emmy Lichtwitz Krasso (1895– 1974), Austrian-American artist
