= Franz Cižek =

Czech-Austrian artist (1865-1946)

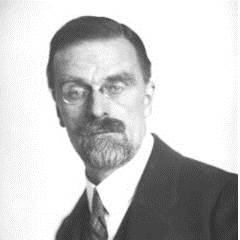
- Cižek around 1910
- Born: František Čížek; 12 June 1865; Litoměřice, Bohemia, Austrian Empire
- Died: 17 December 1946 (aged 81); Vienna, Austria
- Known for: painter, teacher
- Movement: Art education

Franz Cižek (12 June 1865 – 17 December 1946) was a Czech-Austrian genre and portrait painter, and teacher. He was a reformer of art education. He began the Child Art Movement in Vienna, opening the Juvenile Art Class in 1897.

== Life ==
Franz Cižek was born František Čížek on 12 June 1865 in Litoměřice in northern Bohemia, Austrian Empire (now in the Czech Republic). He came to Vienna at the age of 19. He died there on 17 December 1946.

== Career ==
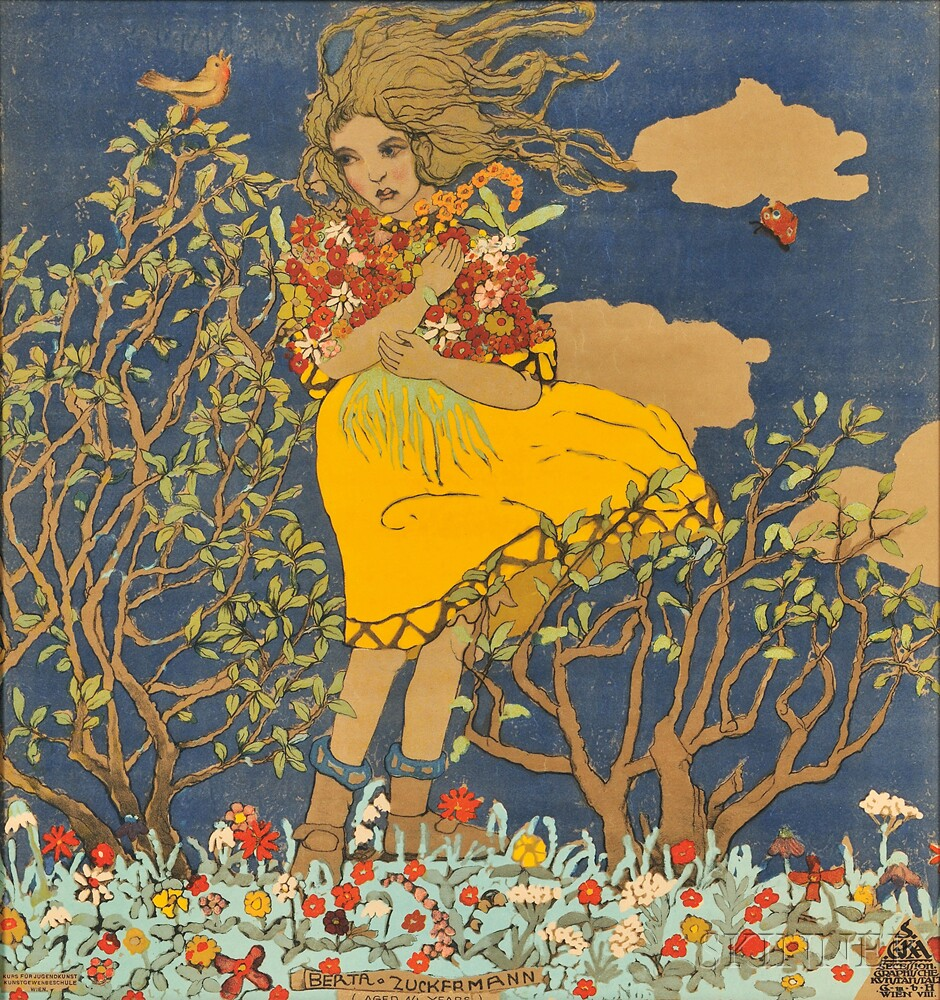
A painting (after Cižek) by one of his students, Berta Zuckermann, age 14

In 1885, Cižek entered the Academy of Fine Arts in Vienna. He was a student of the German painters Franz Rumpler, Josef Mathias von Trenkwald, and Siegmund L'Allemand. While a student, he lived with a family and the children visited him in his room, where he allowed them to use his art supplies and encouraged them to express themselves. He was impressed by their creativity and showed the work to fellow artists at the university, who encouraged him to start an art school for children. The Juvenile Art Classes were free of charge to children of Vienna. The children were interviewed and selected by Cižek. His teaching method had limited structure, and imagination and free expression were encouraged.

In 1904, he was appointed director of the Department of Experimentation and Research at the Vienna School of Applied Arts. Some of his students became teaching assistants for the children's art classes. One assistant was Erika Giovanna Klien, who later emigrated to the United States and employed Cižek's teaching methods at Stuyvesant High School and the Dalton School. Another artist, Emmy Lichtwitz Krasso, was an assistant from 1933 to 1935, and later went to India where she started a children's art movement in the Mumbai schools.

In November 1920, the children's art was exhibited at the British Institute for Industrial Art in Kingsbridge, England, and then toured the country. In 1921 Francesca Wilson, a Birmingham teacher, exhibited the child art in London. This exhibition and those for the Save the Children Fund raised interest in the Child Art Movement. They are also early examples of featuring art in raising funds and awareness for humanitarian causes.

Among those Cižek influenced was a Swiss painter and Bauhaus leader Johannes Itten. Arthur Lismer, a Canadian artist, was also inspired by Cižek and John Dewey to found a Children's Art Centre at the Art Gallery of Toronto in 1933, and at the Montreal Museum of Fine Arts in 1946. At the University of Applied Arts, Cižek taught Gertrude Hirsch who later migrated to India to pursue a life of art education and textile art. Cižek's life was described by Dr. Wilhelm Viola, his former student who became a lecturer at the Royal Drawing Society. Alice Mavrogordato was a former student, who became a recognized abstract painter.
