= Jibeswar Baruah =

Indian sculptor (1906–1964)

- Born: 1906; Amolapatti, Sibsagar district, Assam
- Died: 31 January 1964 (aged 57–58); Guwahati, Assam, India
- Known for: Painting & Sculpture
- Movement: Modernism

Jibeswar Baruah (1906–1964) was an Indian artist. He lived and worked in Guwahati in the Indian state of Assam. He founded the Government College of Art and Crafts, Assam.

== Early life ==
Jibeswar Baruah was born in 1906 in Amolapatti Sibsagar. He was raised in a lower-middle class family.

== Career ==
He was appointed as the drawing teacher at Panbazaar Girls H. E. School, Guwahati. He started an art school within the school. He struggled to make it a fully-fledged art school, given the lack of organized state effort to support such activities.

Subsequently, Baruah started a photographic business. In 1947, Baruah reopened the Art school in a single room in Don Bosco School at Paanbazar.

In 1948, his art school began to receive a recurring grant of Rs. 50.00 per month from the State Government. In 1959, the school's grant was increased to Rs. 300.00 which it shared with Lalit Kala Academy in Lakhtokia. Baruah was the secretary of the state Lalit Kala Academy. Art classes were continued in two of the first floor's three rooms.

After Baruah's demise Lalit Kala Academy separated from the school of art and moved to Santipur into a rented house ghag became known as Government College of Arts and Crafts Assam. The Government College of Art and Crafts was there until 2005. Later it was moved to its own land and building in Basistha.

In 1958, it held its first National exhibition in Delhi. Lalit Kala Academy organized another exhibition at Guwahati, headed by Baruah. The exhibition took place at Ambari cottage emporium. In 1962, Lalit Kala Academy organized another exhibition at Shilong, headed by Baruah as the school secretary. In that exhibition Bhabesh Chandra Sanyal exhibited. Sanyal was then secretary of Delhi Lalit Kala Academi.

He organized an art exhibition at the request of Humayun Kabir, then Minister of Education and Scientific Research, Govt. of India. Exhibits were collected from living artist and art students and included works from teachers and students. Filmmaker Satyajit Ray visited the Tagore exhibition.

== Death ==
He died on 31 January 1964.
