= Cotton Collegiate Government H.S. School =

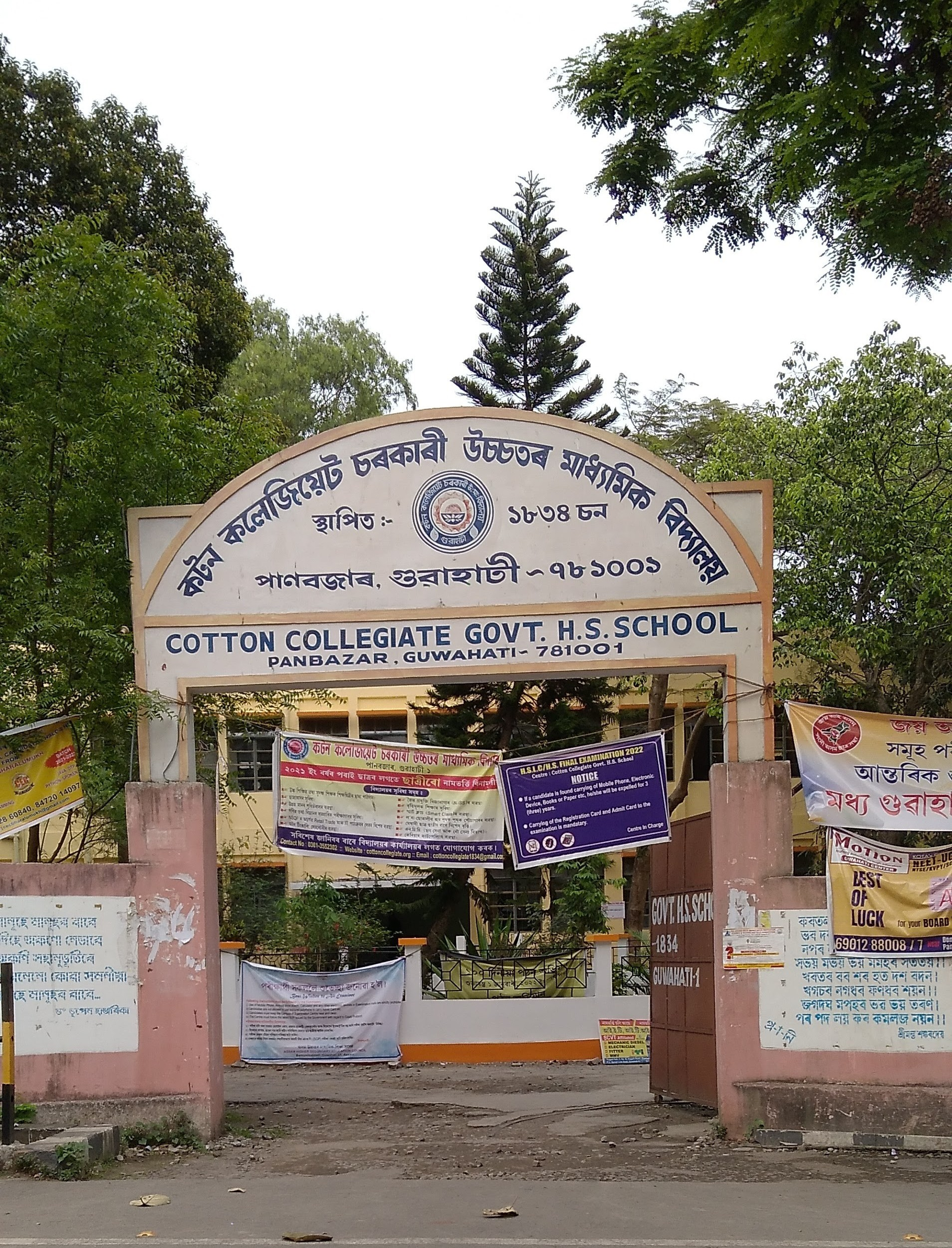
- Entrance Gate of Cotton Collegiate School

Location
- Pan Bazaar, Guwahati, Assam; India; 26°11′18″N 91°44′42″E

Information
- Type: Government
- Established: 1834; 192 years ago
- Founder: Captain Francis Jenkins
- School district: Kamrup Metropolitan district
- Principal: Kumud Chandra Barman (2025-present)
- Affiliation: Board of Secondary Education, Assam Assam Higher Secondary Education Council
- Website: cottoncollegiate.org

Cotton Collegiate Government Higher Secondary School is an institution for high school education located in the heart of Guwahati, Assam, a northeastern state of India. It is the oldest school in the entire North-East India.

== Brief history ==
The school was founded by Captain Francis Jenkins (who was the commissioner of Assam from 1834-1861) in the year of 1834 and Jenkins name the school as 'Guwahati Seminary School' as English medium school. and then the school were officially commenced it's academic session or teaching in the year of 1835 with 58 students. Establishment of this school laid the foundation of secondary education in Assam. The school was renamed as Collegiate School in 1865 and again in 1900s school was renamed as Cotton Collegiate School, known as to this day. Mr Singer was the first headmaster of the school.

== Courses ==
- Class VI(Six) to Class X(Ten) under Board of Secondary Education, Assam (SEBA).
- Two year higher Secondary Course in Arts, Science, Commerce and Vocational stream under Assam Higher Secondary Education Council (AHSEC).

== Facilities ==
=== Co-Curricular & Others ===
- Atal Tinkering Lab
- NSQF compliant vocational subjects of IT/ITeS and Retail from Class IX to XII along with IT and Retail Lab.
- BLISS.
- Tele-Education.
- ICT @ School.
- NCC (ARMY & NAVY)
- Scout & Guide.
- Well equipped library.
- Legal Cell.
- School Magazine-“Pragjyoti”

=== Sports ===
Annual sports are observed as per academic calendar of SEBA and AHSEC. The school encourages and motivates also trains for participating in Indoor and Outdoor Games, Debate and Quiz, Literary and Cultural competitions.

== Notable alumni ==
1. Gopinath Bordoloi
2. Tarun Ram Phukan
3. Hiren Gohain
4. Hiren Bhattacharyya
5. Anundoram Borooah
6. Bhupen Hazarika
7. Samujjal Bhattacharyja
