= Bratovshchina =

Bratovshchina Братовщина
- Selo
- Location within Bashkortostan Location within Russia
- Coordinates: 56°02′N 55°17′E
- Country: Russia
- Region: Bashkortostan
- District: Kaltasinsky District
- Time zone: UTC+5:00

Bratovshchina (Russian: Братовщина) is a rural locality (a selo) in Staroyashevsky Selsoviet, Kaltasinsky District, Bashkortostan, Russia. The population was 51 as of 2010. There are 3 streets.

== Geography ==
Bratovshchina is located 67 km northeast of Kaltasy (the district's administrative centre) by road. Staroyashevo is the nearest rural locality.
