= Government College of Art & Crafts Assam =

Art school in Guwahati, India

Government College Of Arts and Crafts Assam
- Type: Government
- Established: 15 August 1947; 78 years ago
- Founder: Jibeswar Baruah
- Affiliations: Gauhati University
- Principal: Krishna Goswami (in charge)
- Location: Basistha Mandir Rd, Ganesh Nagar, Basishta, Guwahati, Assam 781029, India, google maps, Guwahati, Assam, India; 26°06.04′N 91°47.81′E
- Website: official website

Government College Of Arts and Crafts Assam or GCAC is one of the oldest art colleges in Northeast India. It offers Bachelor Of Fine Arts (Degree) (B.F.A.) to students of Northeast India.

== History ==
The School of Art was started in a single room in the Don Bosco School at Paanbazar in 1947 by Jibeswar Baruah.

In 1979 twenty bighas of land was allocated to the School of Art. Two Assam-type houses constructed at the time are used as a student hostel and for sculptures.

== Alumni ==
- Temsuyanger Longkumer
