= Emmy Lichtwitz Krasso =

Austrian-American painter

Emmy Lichtwitz Krasso (January 19, 1895 – August 6, 1974) was an Austrian-American artist. Her artwork ranged from the Old Master style to Expressionism.

== Career ==
Lichtwitz Krasso attended the Academy of Art for Women from 1911 to 1916 in Vienna, Austria, also known as the Vienna Women's Academy. At the Royal Academy of Fine Arts in Budapest, Hungary, she earned a Master of Fine Arts degree in 1917. She did postgraduate work at the State Textile School, and the State Institute of Graphical Arts at the University of Vienna. At the university in Budapest, she learned all techniques of painting, ending with the Old Master technique.

From 1918 to 1938 she had her own studio in Vienna, where she taught students from 1925 to 1938. Among the lithographs she created shortly after World War I were "Dance of Life" and "Resurrection." Later, she created a series of lithographs entitled "We" showing the connection between "etchers" such as herself and city workers. Among these drawings were "Our Song" and "The Demonstration."

She was an assistant from 1933 to 1935 to Professor Franz Cižek, who founded the Child Art Movement. She was especially influenced by Expressionism, which began in Germany and her native Austria during her childhood.

In 1939 she and her husband, Oscar T. Krasso, fled Austria for Mumbai (Bombay), India. While there, she asked Mohandas Karamchand Gandhi for permission to sketch him in person. At first, he refused, stating he did not seek publicity for himself, but when he heard that she was a refugee from her own country, he allowed her to make life sketches of him for one month. From these drawings she created a 7' by 4 1/2' oil painting of Gandhi in the Old Master style in 1945. The same year, she had a one-man show in Mumbai.

=== Art education ===
In Mumbai, she began a children’s art movement in the schools. Paintings were exchanged between students in India and the United States. Some of these paintings are owned by the Columbia University Library, the Montclair Art Museum, the New York Public Library and Denver Art Museum.

From 1948 to 1951 Lichtwitz Krasso taught at the Parsons School of Design in New York City, introducing puppetry to the school.

In 1952, she received a Bachelor's Degree from New York University and taught in the New York City school system. She developed a system of art education for the non-congenital blind, based on the idea that people who have previously experienced color, form and space, can remember them to a certain degree.

=== Art techniques ===
Lichtwitz Krasso fused Old Master techniques with those of Modern Art. She combined and adapted such Old Master elements as representational figures and applying different layers of paint with Modern Art’s distorted figures and changes in perspective. In the 1950s to the 1970s she worked in collage, often using found objects and creating sculpted or raised surfaces. Most of her later paintings were done with acrylic paint instead of oil. She experimented with acrylic polymer (plastic) media, for its bright clear color and resistance to dampness. She used acrylic polymer to make a kind of modeling paste or by soaking a cloth with this paste and sculpting it, to create a bas-relief effect. Her collages often employed common articles such as shells, nets, paper, and even bicycle chains.

== Legacy ==
Lichtwitz Krasso has a series in the Albertina Museum in Vienna, and her work is in the Museum of Modern Western Art in Moscow for its permanent collection, now the Pushkin State Museum of Fine Arts and the Leningrad Art Museum, and in the Olomouc Museum of Art in the Czech Republic. In the United States, the Jane Voorhees Zimmerli Art Museum of Rutgers University in New Brunswick, New Jersey, has a collection of her original lithographs dating from 1919 to 1922. Lichtwitz Krasso exhibited in group shows in Rome and Vienna, and Philadelphia, USA. She was a member of the Eastern Art Association, the National Art Education Association, and the Artists Equity Association, among others. Her life-size oil painting of Mahatma Gandhi was completed and exhibited in a one-man show in Mumbai, India in 1945.

== Biography ==
Lichtwitz Krasso was born on January 19, 1895 in Troppau, Austrian-Silesia, now Opava in the Czech Republic. She was the daughter of Theodor Lichtwitz and Therese Grun. Her grandfather, Emanuel Lichtwitz was a liguor manufacturer and importer in Opava, and the family had relatives in Bordeaux, France and Vienna, Austria. The Wilhelm Reich Trust Fund has a photograph of Emmy Lichtwitz (pre-1930) with pianist and arranger Erna Gal. After leaving Austria, she and her husband traveled to Russia, and then to India.

She married Oscar Tuk Krasso on October 20, 1930. They came to the United States in 1946 and she was naturalized in 1952. She lived in South Plainfield, New Jersey, and taught art in her home until several years before her death, in Plainfield, New Jersey, on August 6, 1974.

== Bibliography ==
- Who's Who in World Jewry, A Biographical Dictionary of Outstanding Jews, New York (1965)
- Article, Courier-News, New Jersey, Section A, page 17 (September 5, 1979), and article and photograph of the artist with the Gandhi portrait, Courier-News (June 1955)
- Arbeiter-Zeitung (Vienna), Number 32, 1.2, S. 17 (1931)
