= Richard Dobson (disambiguation) =

Richard Dobson is an American singer-songwriter.

Richard Dobson may also refer to:

- Ritchie Neville (born 1979), real name Richard Dobson, English singer
- Richard Dobson (businessman), English businessman
