= House of Worth =

French Fashion house

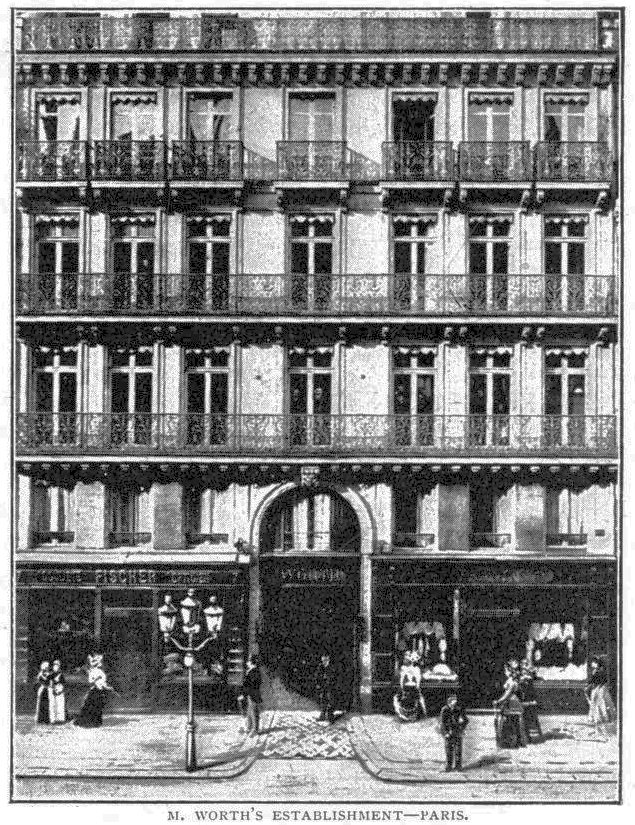
- House of Worth at 7 Rue de la Paix, Paris in 1894
- Industry: Fashion design, Fragrance
- Founded: 1858
- Founder: Charles Frederick Worth
- Headquarters: 7 rue de la Paix, Paris, France
- Number of locations: Paris, London
- Area served: Worldwide
- Website: worthparis.com (archived 16 December 2019)

The House of Worth was a French fashion house that specialized in haute couture, ready-to-wear clothes, and perfumes. It was founded in 1858 by English designer Charles Frederick Worth. It continued to operate under his descendants until 1952 and closed in 1956. Between 2010 and 2013 there was an attempt to relaunch the House of Worth as a fashion brand.

== The Historic House of Worth ==
Charles Frederick Worth opened his own design house in 1858, in partnership with Otto Bobergh, in Paris at 7 Rue de la Paix. Worth previously worked at Swan & Edgar and Lewis & Allenby in London, and at Maison Gagelin in Paris. It was at Gagelin where he first established his reputation as a dressmaker. In the 1850s, his designs for Gagelin won commendations at Universal Expositions in London and Paris.

While Worth was still at Gagelin, the house had supplied the trousseau for the newly married Empress Eugénie. After opening his own house, the Empress appointed him court designer. Her patronage increased his reputation and business success. He dressed leading performers of the day: Sarah Bernhardt, Lillie Langtry, Jenny Lind, and Nellie Melba. Worth also created unique special-event pieces for his best clients, such as masquerade ball costumes and wedding dresses.

Worth was known for preparing several designs for each season, which were then shown by live models. Clients would make their selections and have them made to their own measurements in his work rooms. His designs incorporated elegant fabrics, detailed trimming, and superb fit. Wealthy women in the 19th century had four changes of dress during the day, and many clients would purchase their entire wardrobes from Worth.

In 1871, Worth dissolved his association with Bobergh. His design and promotional talents had made the House of Worth a highly successful international business. Upon Worth's death in 1895, sons Gaston-Lucien (1853–1924) and Jean-Philippe (1856–1926) assumed the business.

In 1924, the House, now operated by grandson Jacques Worth, ventured into the perfume market. The company's first fragrance, developed by perfumer Maurice Blanchet, was Dans la Nuit, and glassmaker René Lalique was commissioned to design the bottle. Les Parfumes Worth was established as a separate business and launched more than 20 fragrances between 1924 and 1947.

The house remained successful under Worth's descendants but faced increasing competition. In 1950, the House of Worth was taken over by the House of Paquin. In 1952, the Worth family influence ended with the retirement of great-grandson Roger. In 1956, the house shut down the couture operations. From 1968, House of Worth was owned by Sidney Massin of Massin Furs in Wigmore Street, London] who put it up for sale in 1987 for £750,000.

After the closure of the Paris couture house, Les Parfums Worth was bought by Société Maurice Blanchet. It was sold in 1992, to David Reimer and became part of International Classic Brands. It was acquired by Lenthéric in 1999 and was then part of Shaneel Enterprises, Ltd.

=== Gallery ===
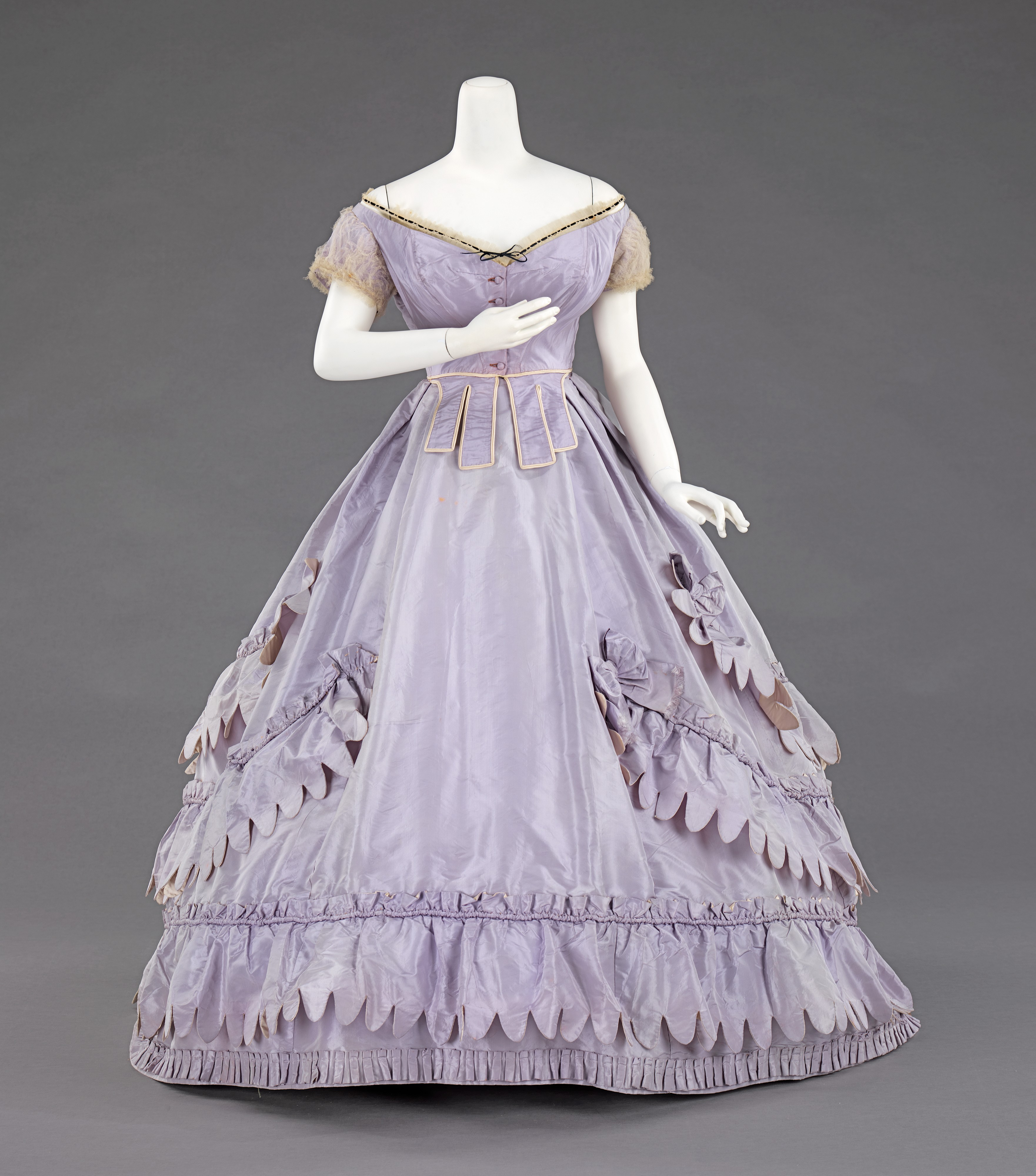
Evening dress designed by Charles Frederick Worth, 1862-1865

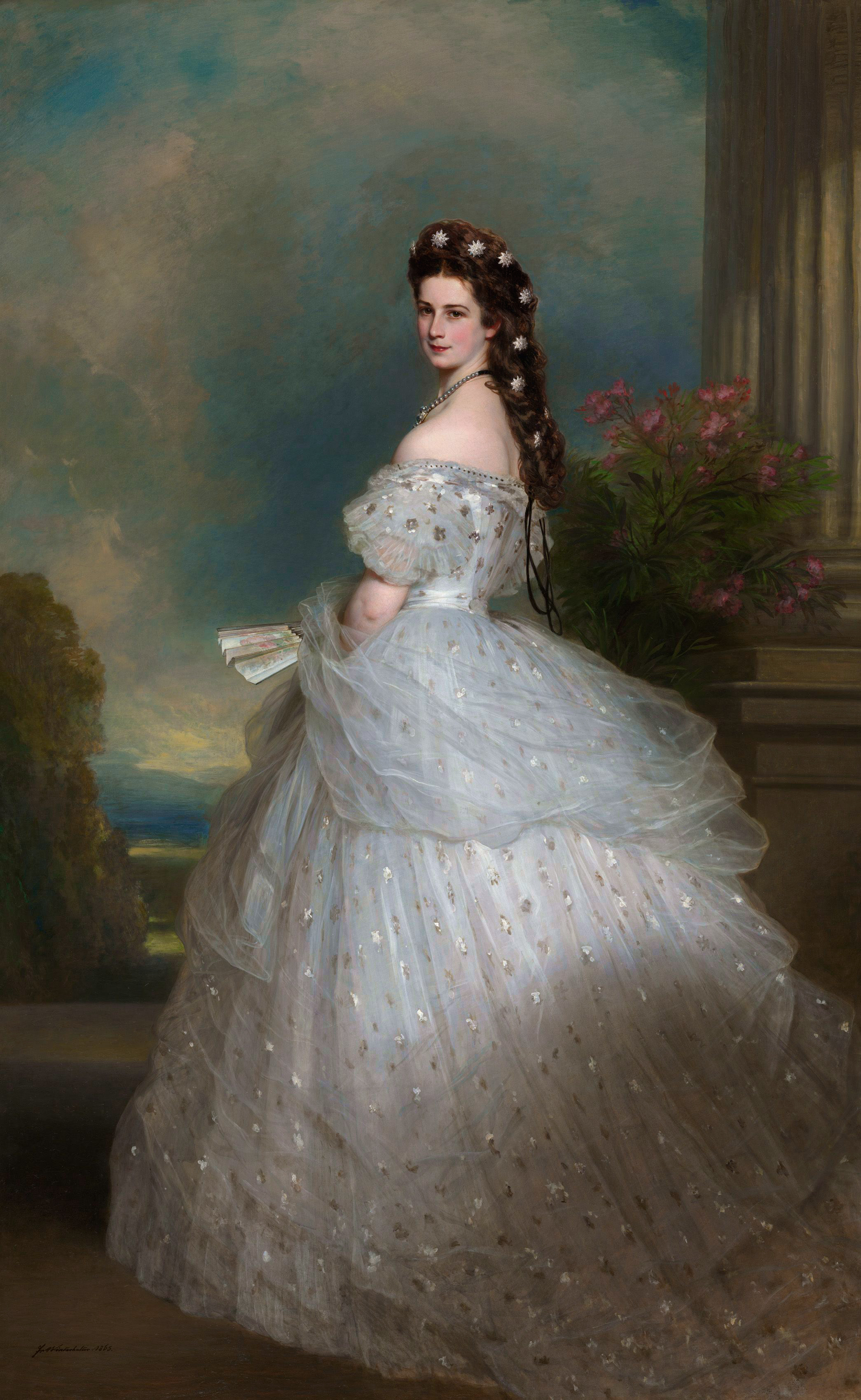
Portrait of Empress Elisabeth of Austria wearing a courtly gala dress designed by Charles Frederick Worth, 1865

Afternoon dress designed by Charles Frederick Worth, ca. 1875

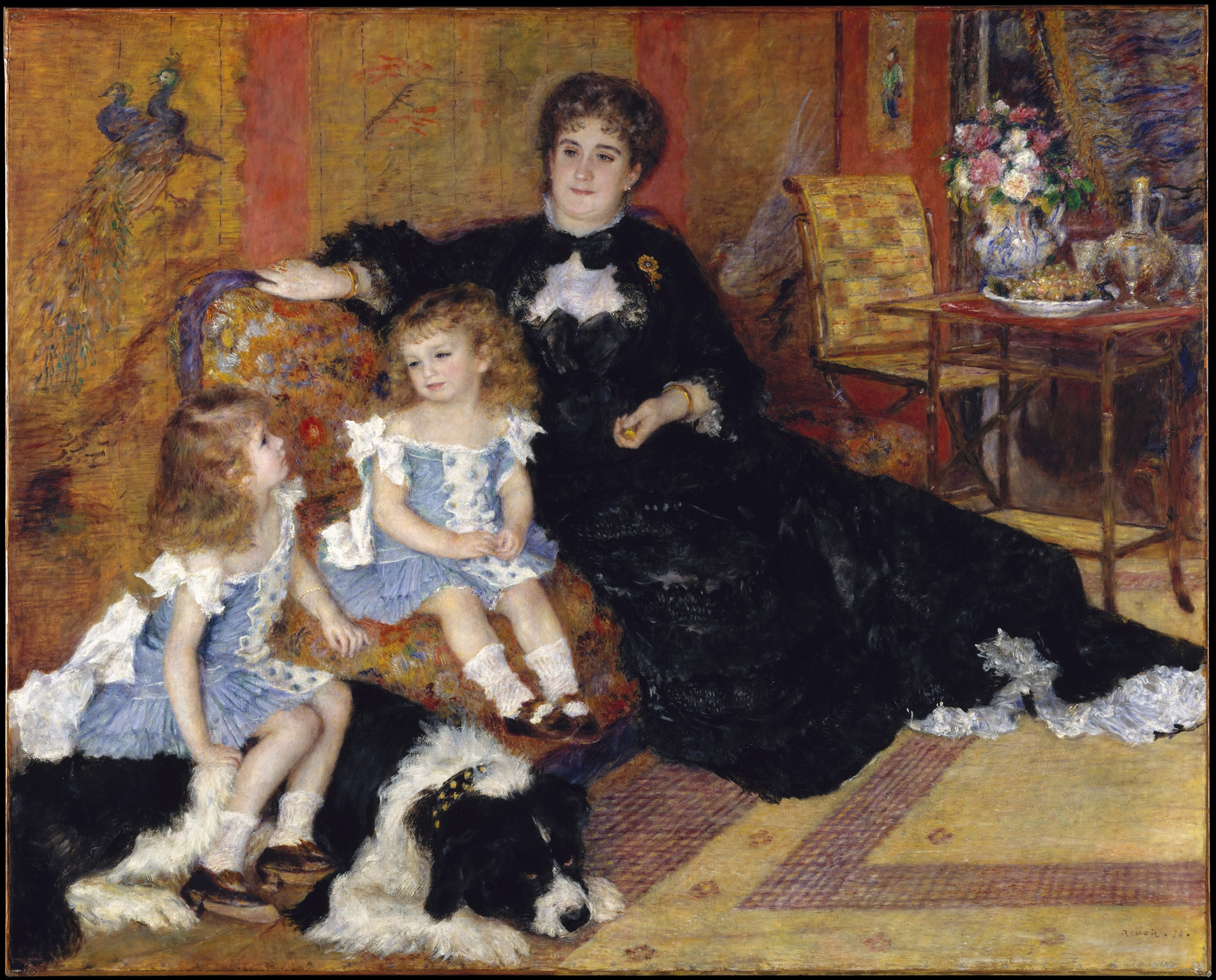
Portrait of Marguerite Charpentier (1848–1904) wearing a black silk day dress in a painting by Renoir, 1878

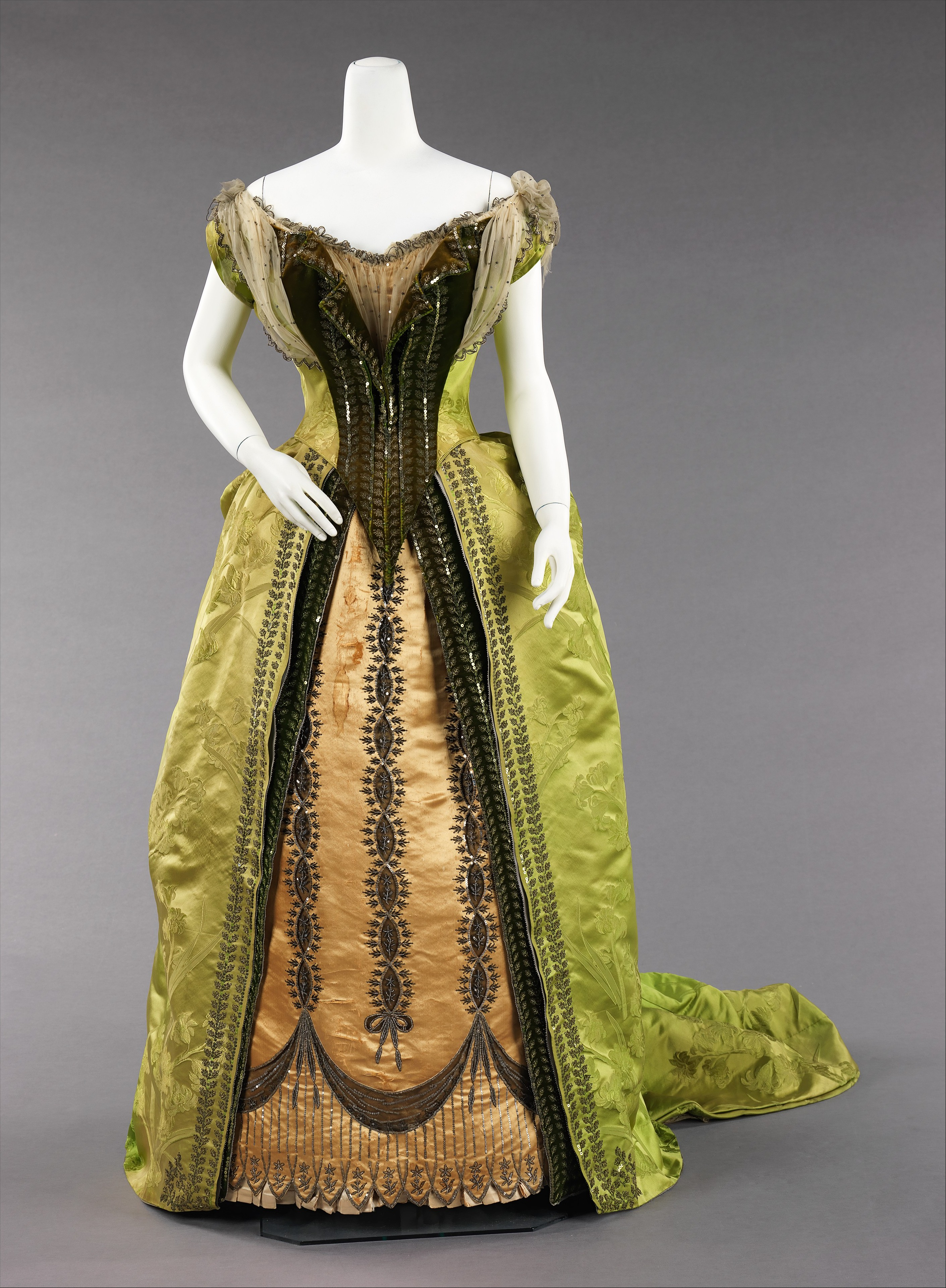
Evening dress designed by Charles Frederick Worth, 1887

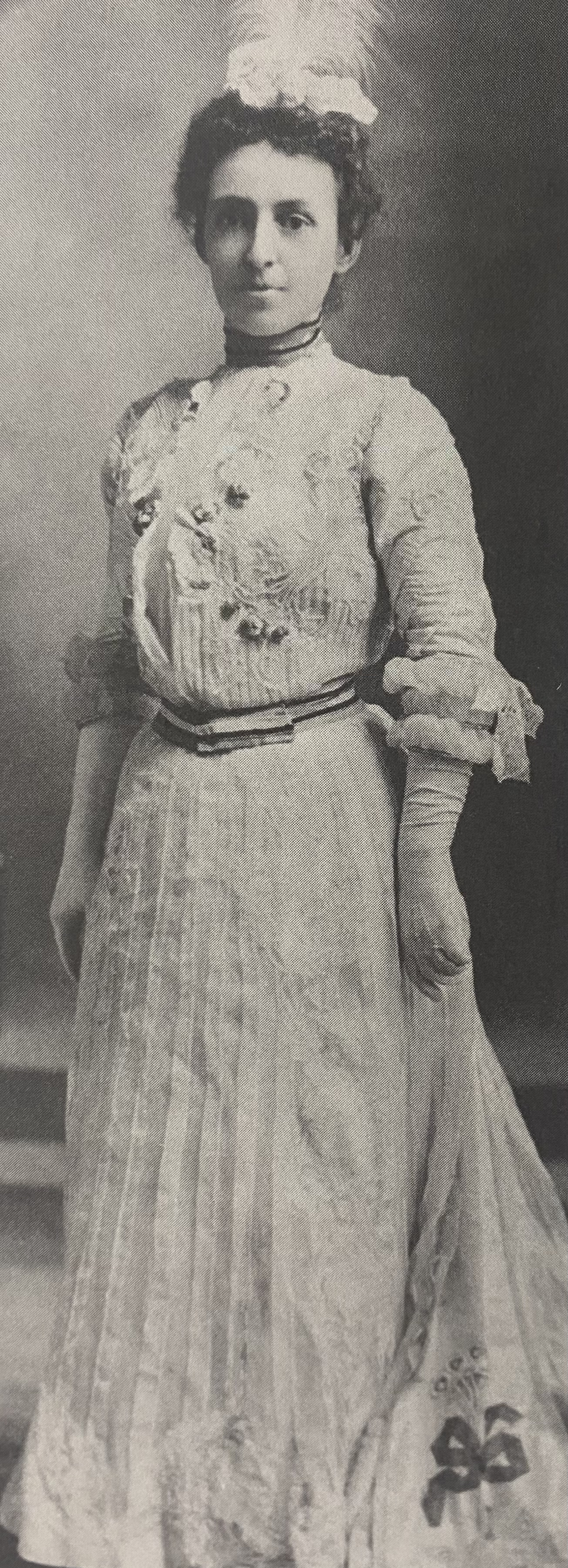
Cora Lily Woodard Aycock wearing a dress by Jean-Philippe Worth, 1901

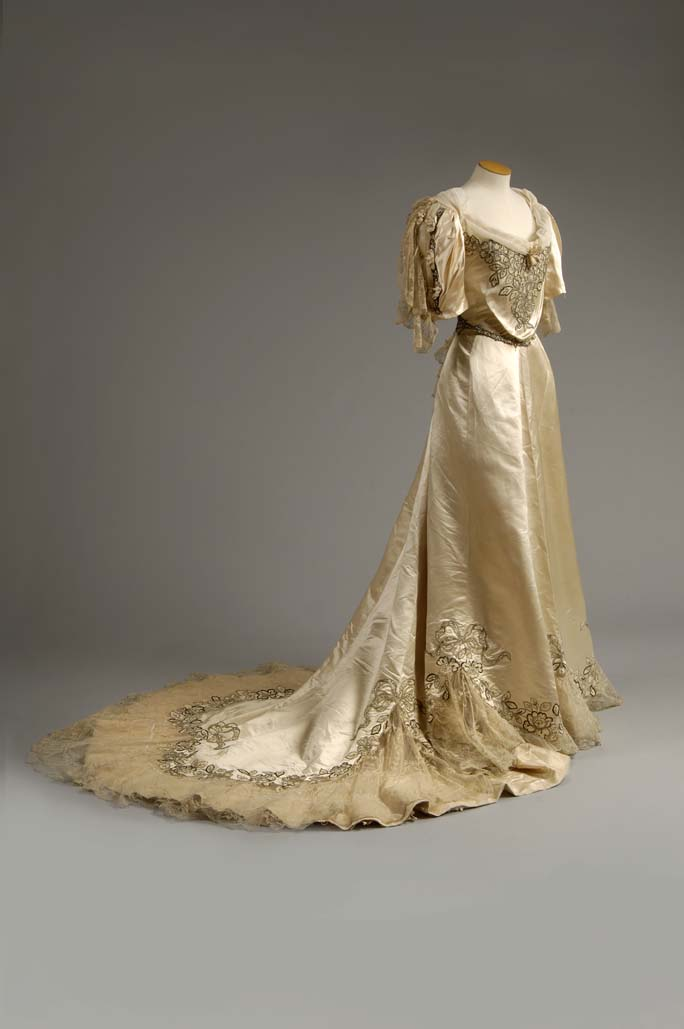
Early 1900s court presentation dress designed by Jean-Philippe Worth

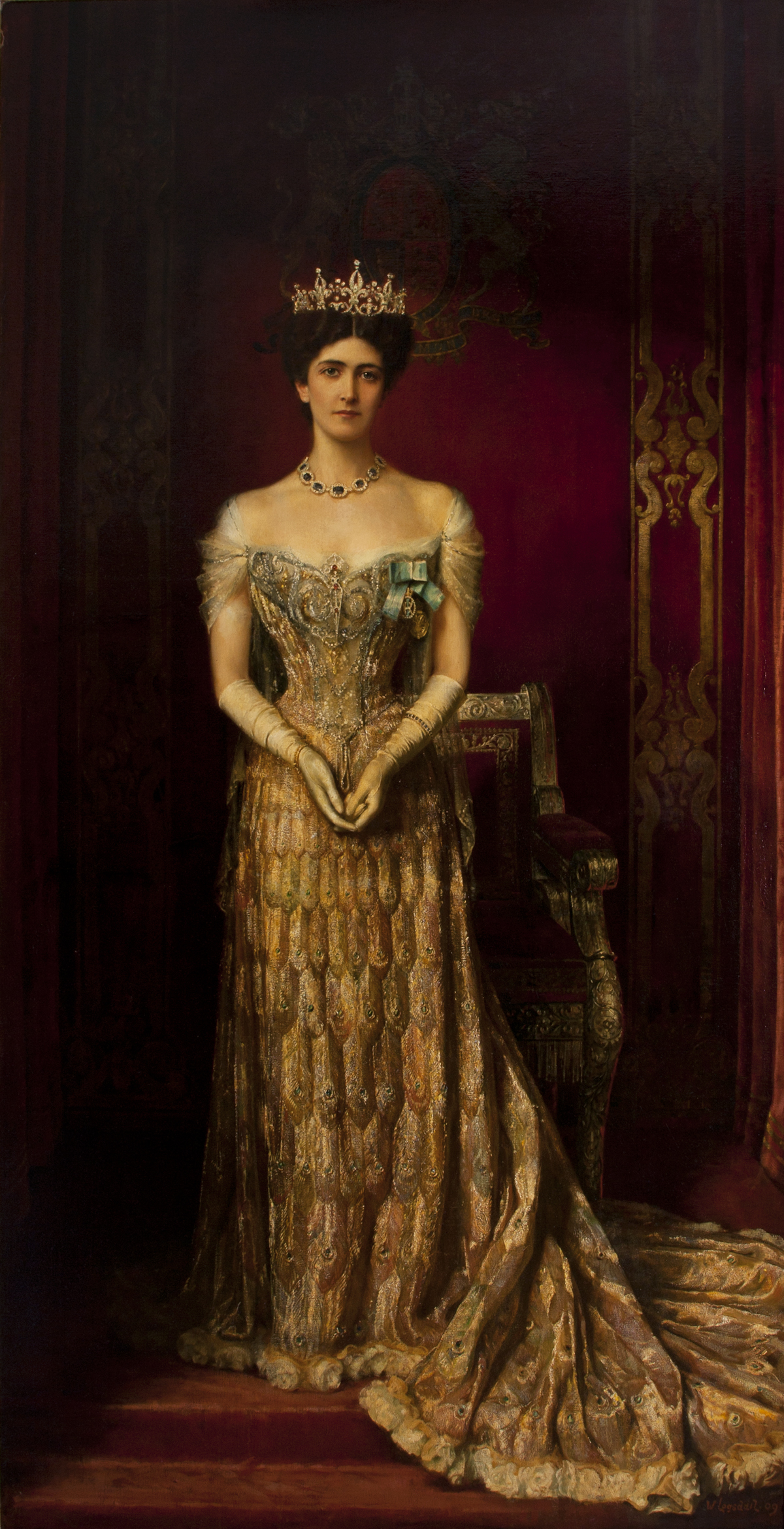
Portrait of Mary Curzon wearing the peacock dress designed by Jean-Philippe Worth for the second Delhi Durbar (1903)

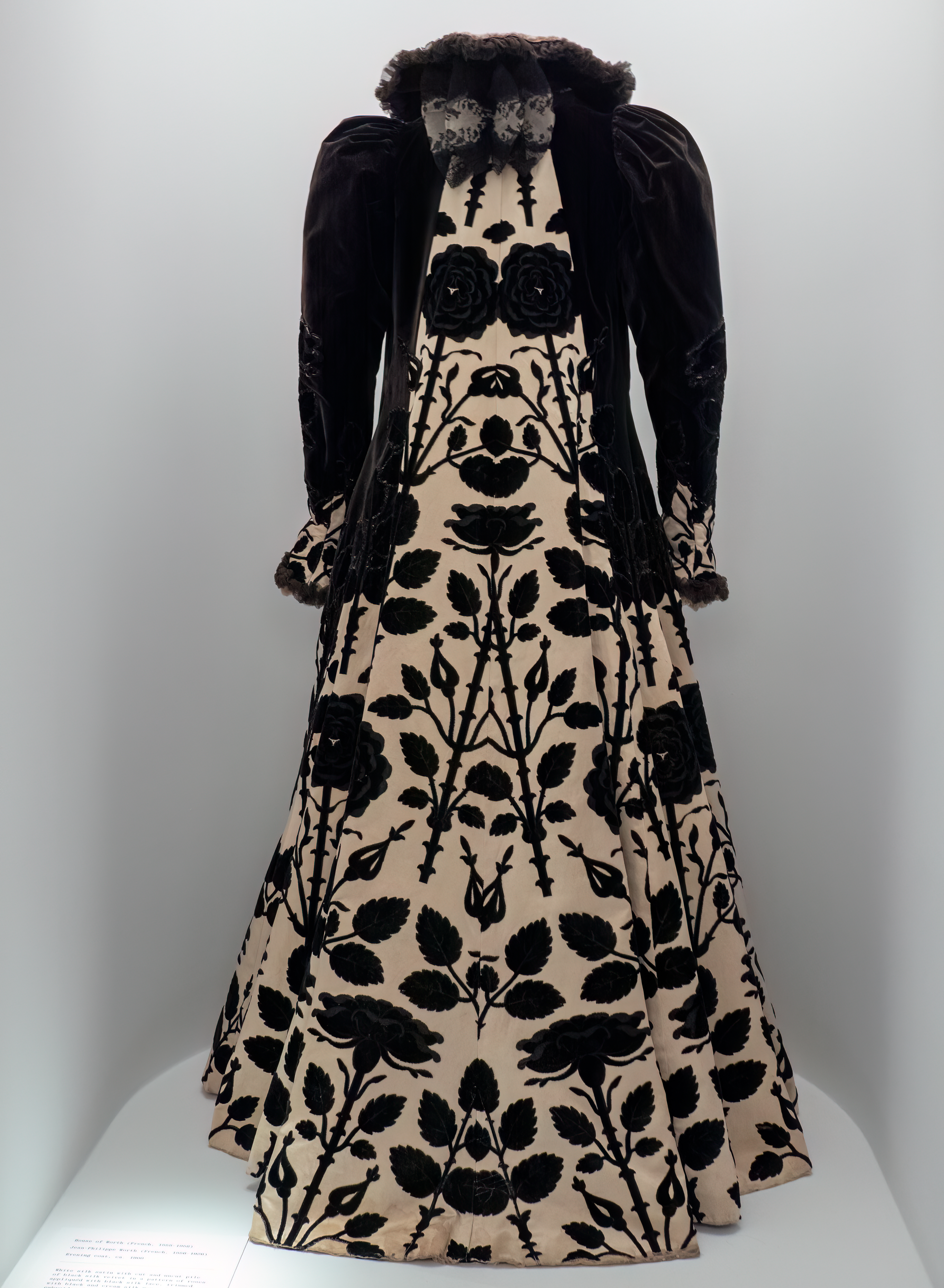
Evening gown ca. 1900 featured in the 2024 Sleeping Beauties: Reawakening Fashion exhibition at the Metropolitan Museum of Art

== Fragrances of the Les Parfumes Worth. 1924 – 1947 ==
- Dans la Nuit (1924) – M. Blanchet/R. Lalique (the bottle)
- Vers le Jour (1925) – M. Blanchet/R. Lalique (the bottle)
- Sans Adieu (1929) – M. Blanchet/R. Lalique (the bottle)
- Je Reviens (1932) – M. Blanchet
- Vers Toi (1934) – M. Blanchet
- Projets (1935)
- Imprudence (1938) – M. Blanchet
- Requête (1944)

== The Revived House of Worth ==
In 1999, the brand House of Worth was revived by entrepreneurs Dilesh and Hitesh Mehta. The fashion and perfume intellectual properties were consolidated from the original firm's various family and corporate descendants into a single corporate entity. Giovanni Bedin became its principal designer. Couture operations were launched for the Spring/Summer 2010 season. The look updated and modernized Edwardian corsets elaborately decorated with lace and feathers. The voluminous crinolines of the nineteenth century were turned into ballerina-like skirts of tulle netting. The short (65 cm) skirts would also be featured in subsequent couture collections. The prêt-à-porter label Courtworth was launched in 2011 in the United States. The last couture collection was presented during the Fall/Winter 2013 season.

The revived house continues to produce perfumes. It reissued Dans la Nuit (2000) and Je Reviens (2005) in reformulated versions. It also introduced new scents Je Reviens Couture (2004), W Superbe, Joyeux Retour, and Courtisan.
