= Gian Singh (artist) =

Indian artist (1883-1953)

- Portrait painting of Gian Singh Naqqash by his son, G.S. Sohan Singh
- Born: 1883; Amritsar, Punjab, British India
- Died: 1953 (aged 69–70); Amritsar, Punjab, India
- Known for: Sikh art
- Notable work: Murals located in the Golden Temple complex
- Style: Mohrakashi naqqashi
- Title: Official naqqash (artist) of the Golden Temple
- Term: 1899 – 1931
- Children: Sunder Singh; Jagat Singh; G.S. Sohan Singh

Gian Singh (1883 – 1953), known as Gian Singh Naqqash, was an Indian artist who specialized in naqqashi (engraving) and mohrakashi (fresco) methods. He was a fresco painter and worked at the Golden Temple for more than 33 years. He is particularly known for painting in the style that is known as the Sikh school of art. He was notable for localizing Sikh art by developing a local Punjabi style that was disassociated from the Pahari style, specifically the Kangra variety, and Persian art styles, which had influenced Punjabi and Sikh art prior. Gian Singh achieved this by incorporating local Punjabi features, dress, and settings in the depicted figuratives. Later-on in his life, he was awarded and recognized by the Shiromani Gurdwara Parbandhak Committee for his artistic efforts.

== Biography ==
=== Early life ===
Gian Singh was born in 1883 in Amritsar, Punjab Province, British India (now Punjab, India). His family had no prior background in art. His father was Charan Singh or Taba Singh, who worked as a comb-maker. As a child, he was a student of Giani Thakur Singh, a Sikh missionary and academic. He studied until the 5th standard. Later-on after finishing primary school, he became the apprentice of Nihal Singh Naqqash, son of Bishan Singh and a third generation descendant of Kehar Singh Naqqash, whom had worked under the patronage of Maharaja Ranjit Singh. He studied drawing and painting under Nihal Singh. He remained a student of Nihal Singh for 14 years until the latter's death in 1905. After Nihal Singh's death, he was instructed by Nihal Singh's brother, Jawahar Singh, another artist who worked at the Golden Temple complex. Jawahar Singh taught him the Kangra school of miniature painting and further advanced his studies in the Sikh school of art. He became indebted in 1911 after loaning money from an Amritsar book publisher, his former employer, to afford to cremate his deceased father.

=== Later life ===
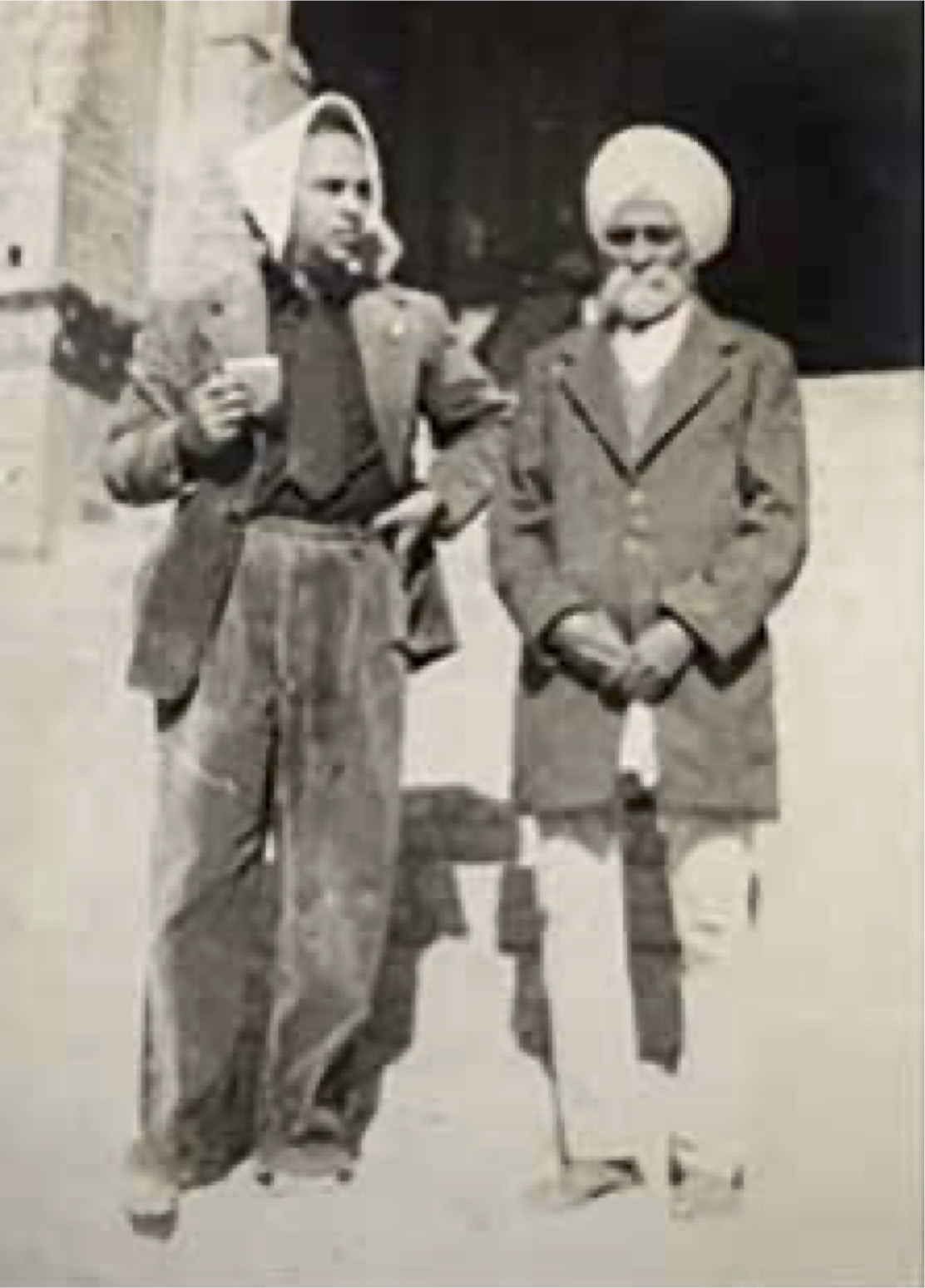
Photograph of Bhai Gian Singh Naqqash (right)

He primarily worked on painting murals at the Golden Temple complex in Amritsar. He served as the official naqqash (engraver) artist of the shrine complex from circa 1899 to 1931. Gian Singh was under the influence of the Akali movement (lehar), and thus depicted khanda symbolism and kirpans in his mural work at the Golden Temple. He chose to paint using a deep, greyish-blue colour (known in Punjabi as surmai) instead of actual black, this reason cited is that he did so to "remain close to the real world". Most of his mural work within the Golden Temple shrine is located near the Har ki Pauri area but most of his wall paintings have been retouched in the years since. It was Gian Singh's idea that the arches of windows located within the shrine would be decorated by paintings.

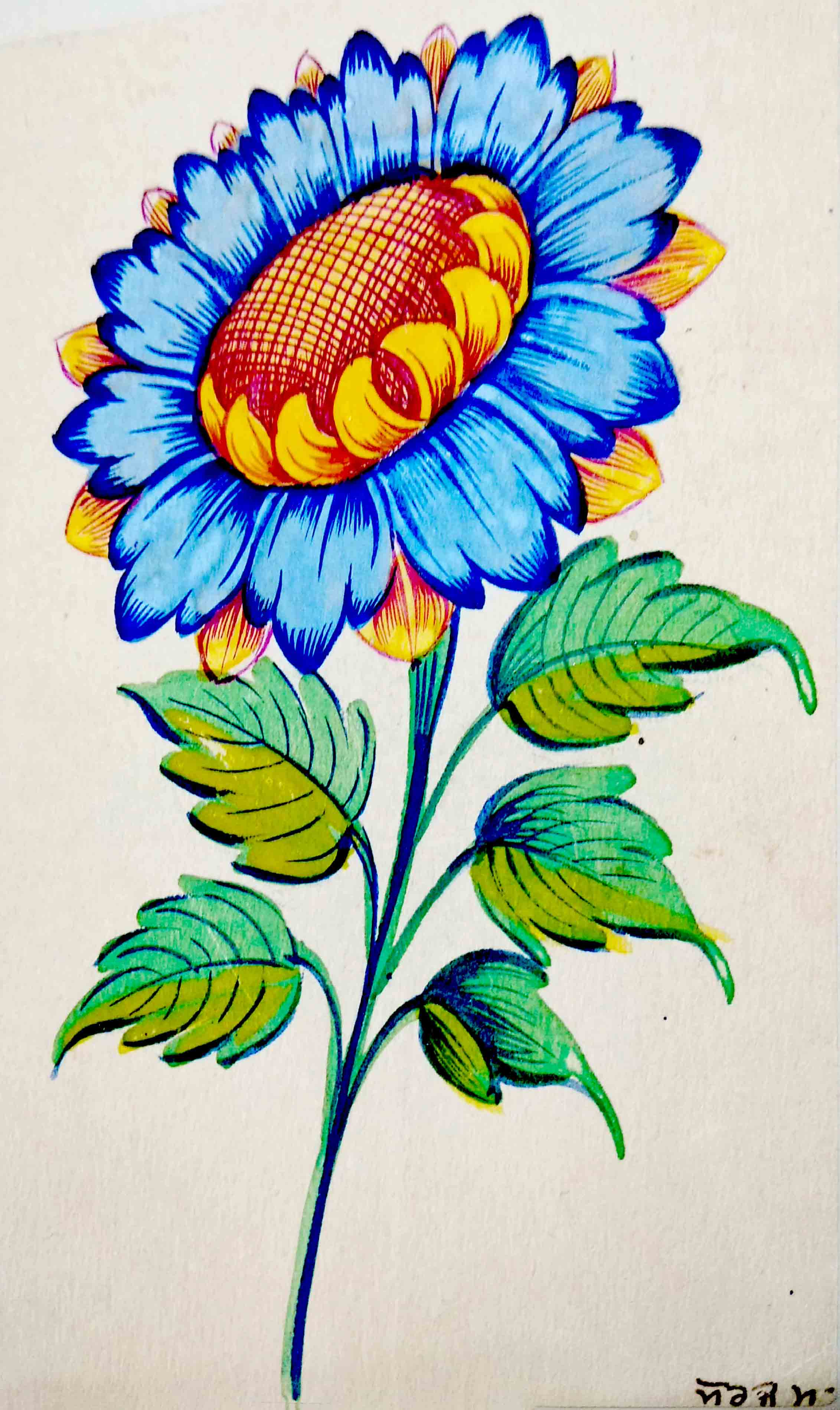
Sunflower in tempera by Gian Singh Naqqash. 6x4 inches, kept in the collection of Art-Heritage, Amritsar.

His commencement of novel motifs on the inner walls, ceiling, and arches of the windows of the first floor serve as valid, extant references of his work. He painted local, seasonal flowers in motif designs as part of the dehin (a variety of pattern category which is a medium of expression of the imaginative study of idealized forms) within a mohrakashi (fresco). He would paint florals, foliage (leaves), creepers, or bushes being surrounded by grapevines or arabesque floral patterns in corners, squares and rectangles, as part of an arrangement. Fine detail was paid attention to even a single petal of a depicted floral design, as these flowers were artistic representations of both season and raga (traditional Indian musical measure, mode, or metre), and thus a systematic pattern is noted. The blooming flowers were depicted within a dehin and arranged by season or raga. The floral work of Gian Singh is a representation of nām rasa.

Another innovation of his is that he painted small depictions of the actual buildings and structures of gurdwaras within his frescoes. Besides the avian designs he introduced, he also ushered in floral designs that were reminiscent of the style of Ustad Mansur of Jahangir's period. He was also responsible for introducing Gurmukhi calligraphic designs sourced from the Ashtapadi of Sukhmani Sahib and the Japji Sahib to the interior arches of windows located on the first floor of the Golden Temple. Gian Singh also possessed talent in in-laid stone artwork, specifically pietra dura, which he implemented at various gurdwaras.

His unique style of incorporating nature, giving a 3D effect to his works, and scribing gurbani verses on gach (plaster), is notable. For example, when he painted foliage such as the leaves of a flower, he would add three-dimensional characteristics and details. On avian (bird) designs, he would go as far as depicting small hairs to the figurines to bring more verisimilitude. Much attention to fine details and highlights were paid attention to by him. Whilst prior artists would simply draw straight lines to create a required shape, Gian Singh improvised by adding more elaborate and finer aspects to bring realism to his artwork. Gian Singh believed that by painting more realistic work, it would bring the viewer closer to the divine.

He used traditional methods of producing paints using natural ingredients and worked with handcrafted brushes. He created his own pigments and brushes. He would grind and burn the pigments himself to produce the necessary colours for his artwork. He would keep various stones in a katori (small bowl), which were burnt with cow-dung overnight. This burning would produce a powder form, which was used for the painting of murals. The pigment colours needed for mural painting in those days were extracted from natural sources and during preparation, further ingredients were added to the concoction, such as leaves, stems, pulses, seeds (such as linseeds), amid others.

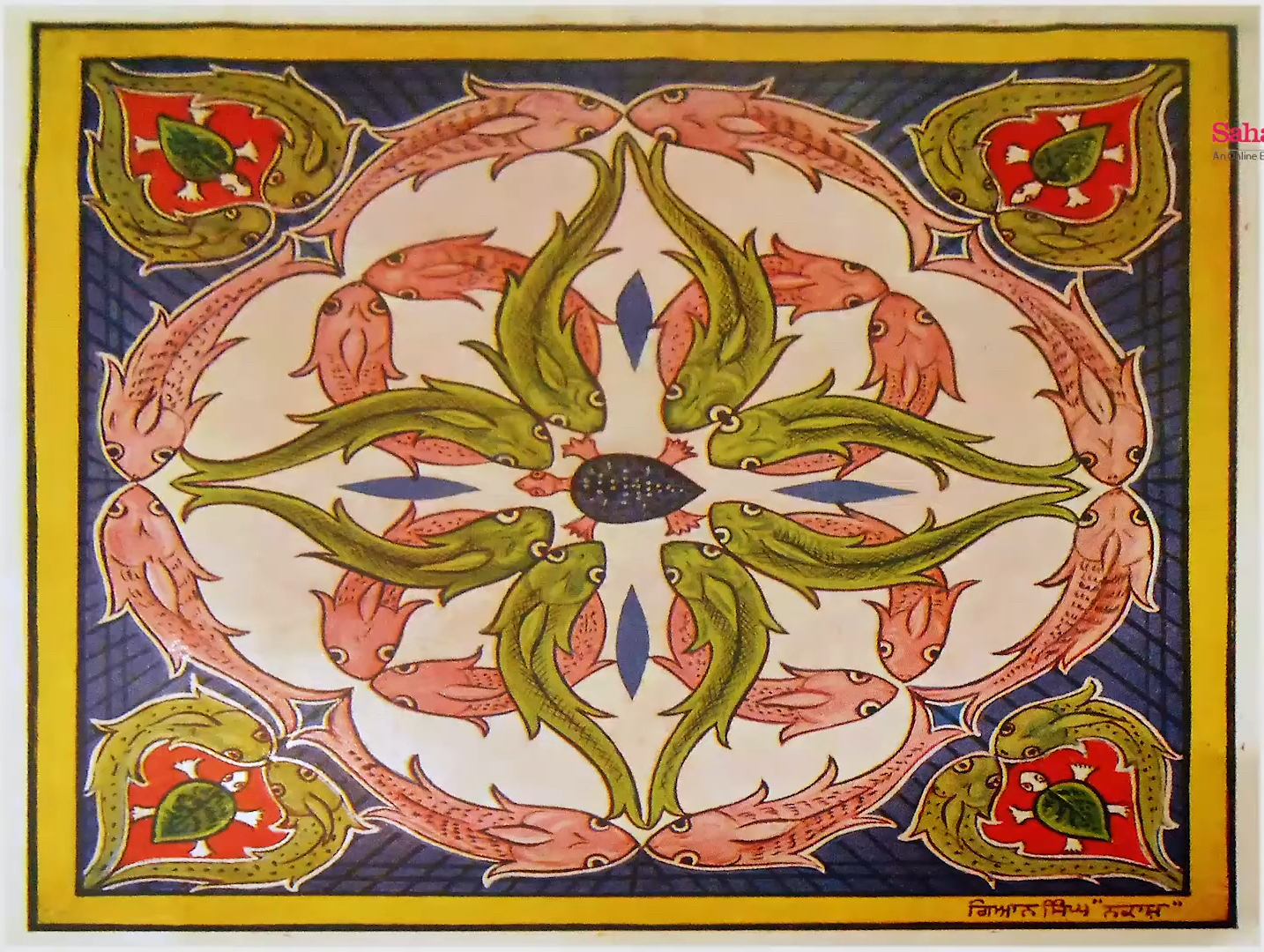
Fresco (mohrakashi dehin design) depicting naturalistic elements of fish and turtles by Gian Singh Naqqash

Painting was a deeply spiritual activity for Gian Singh, as he would recite the name of God, Waheguru, whilst he painted. He would also chant along to gurbani kirtan in the background as he worked within the Golden Temple. Before beginning work on a new mural, he would seek the blessings of Vishwakarma and pay homage to his masters (ustads), Nihal Singh and Jawahar Singh. Whilst former Sikh artists would depict Indic deities on the body of the pedestal, emulating their Mughal and Persian forebears, Gian Singh would replace this with depictions of "grapples" (known as pakṛāṅ in Punjabi) of animals (such as birds), flowers, creepers, and other designs. Formerly, Sikh muralists painted bold designs but Gian Singh took inspiration from the natural world surrounding him which he had observed.

Aside from mural work, he also engaged in gach (stuccowork), jarathari (mosaic work), and tukri (cut-glass work). He was not only skilled in the Sikh school but also the Kangra, Pahari, and Mughal schools of painting.

Apart from being an artist, he was also a prolific writer and wrote many works of literature in Punjabi, Hindi, or Urdu on heritage art and local craft. His literary works were published in Amritsar by Bhai Buta Singh Pratap Singh Pustakawale.

After retiring from his position as an official naqqash artist of the Golden Temple, he delved into framing of pictures and photography.

Gian Singh had three sons. His eldest son Sunder Singh was martyred in the 1919 Jallianwala Bagh massacre, when he was only 17 years. His middle son, Jagat Singh, went on to become an ayurveda expert while his youngest son G.S. Sohan Singh followed Gian Singh's footsteps and became a painter himself. G.S. Sohan Singh began his work as an artist with works of oil on canvas, in-spite of the fact he had been trained in the traditional Sikh art methods.

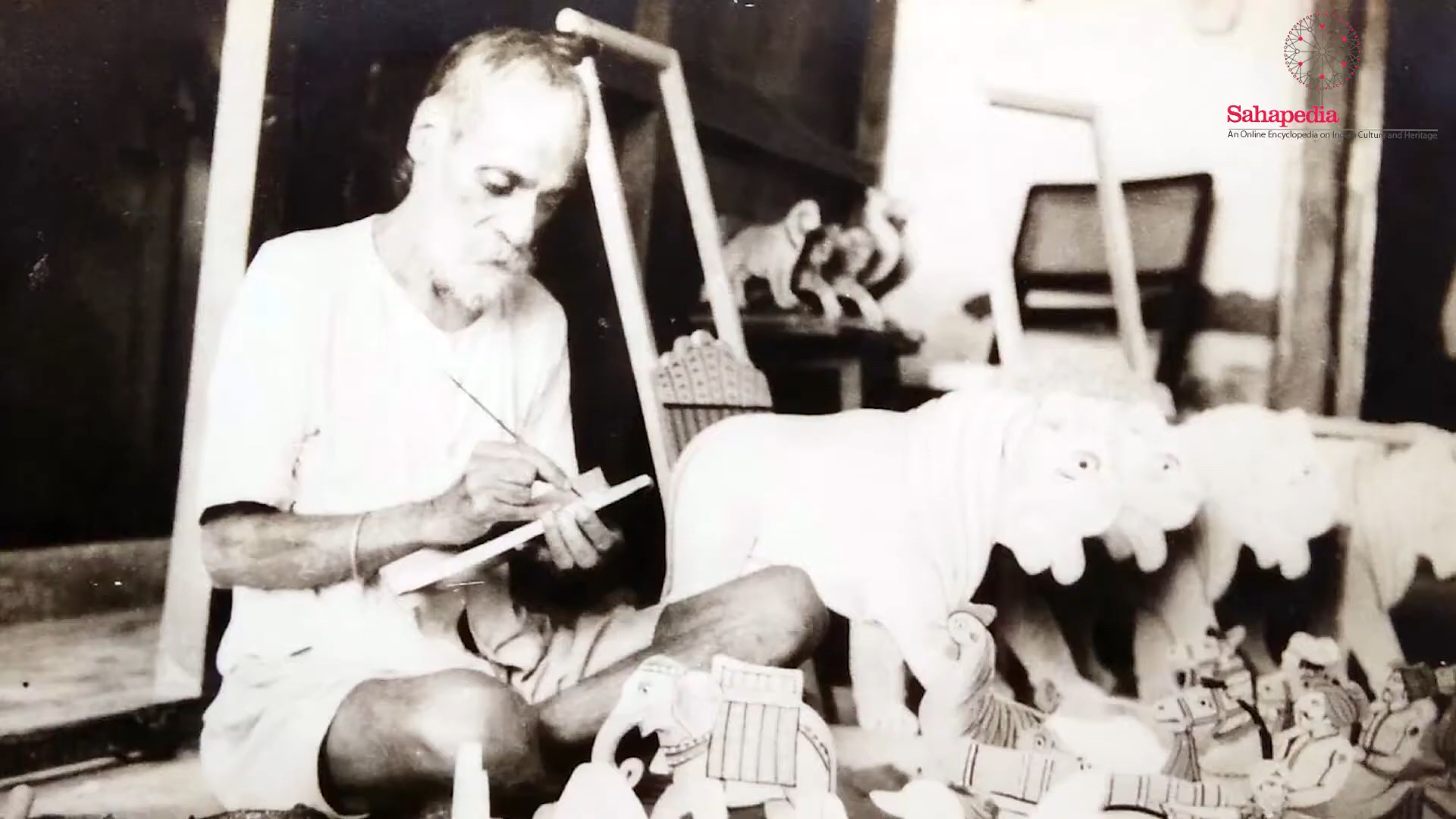
Photograph of Bhai Gian Singh Naqqash painting toys in his later years

In his final years, Gian Singh was in a destitute state and resorted to selling clay and wooden toys he painted himself to earn a livelihood. He also painted banners for theatres during these years. He also went to Pakistan (accompanied by his grandson Surinder Singh) to learn about block printing of paintings from the FW Company at Anarkali Bazaar in Lahore. The block printings of paintings he produced were sold for food. He was skilled in monochrome and tri-colour halftone blocks for the usage for painting religious themes. He also experimentally dabbled in watercolour paintings, oil on canvas paintings, calendar design, book-jacket designs, and additionally worked on newspaper advertisement design. He also engaged in some photography, such as by taking pictures of the Golden Temple shrine complex.

He kept a circle of friends who were also painters, some of whose names included Sobha Singh, Mohinder Singh Randhawa, Mulk Raj Anand, and more. These personalities respected Gian Singh.

Gian Singh was a mentor for his son, Sohan Singh, and trained him. Gian Singh also instructed his grandsons (such as Surinder Singh) on how to grind pigments and how to draw, often using harsh methods to pass on the knowledge.

Gian Singh died in 1953 at the age of 70 in extreme poverty and indebted.

== Legacy ==
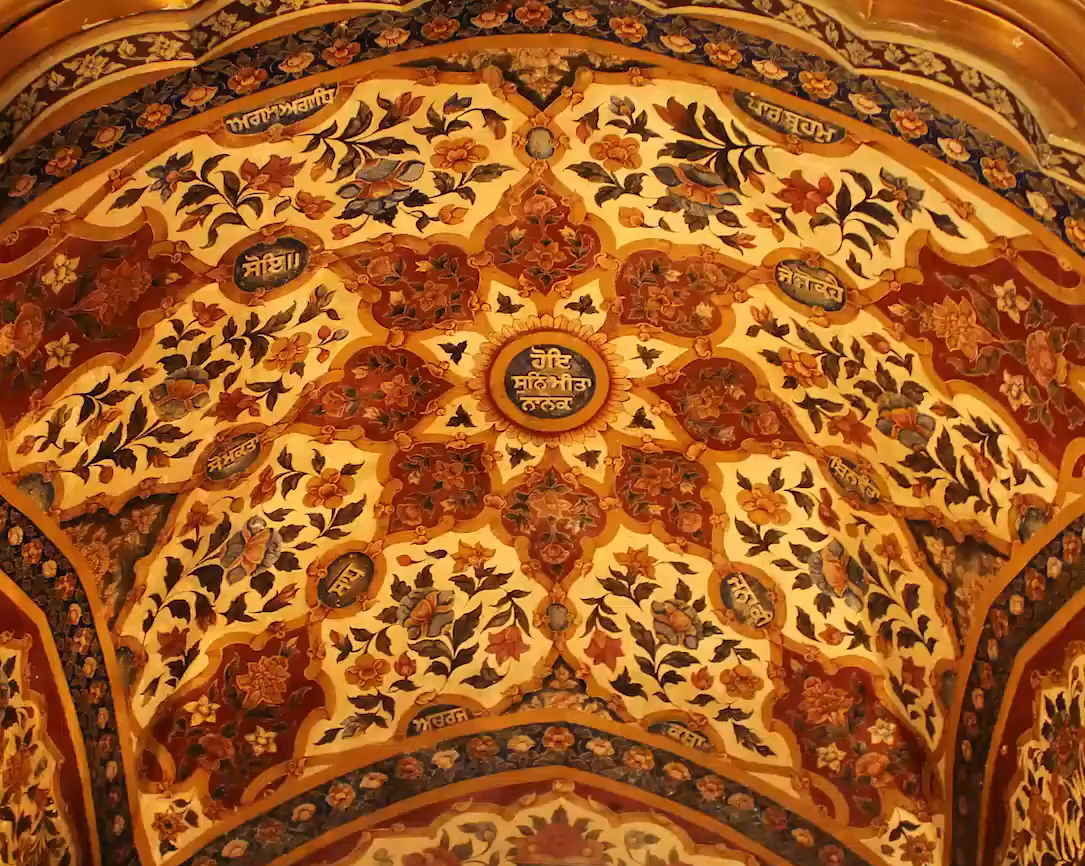
Frescoes containing Gurmukhi calligraphy in tondo with lexemes sourced from Sikh scriptures above the arches of windows located within the Golden Temple shrine in Amritsar, by Gian Singh Naqqash (since retouched and restored by other artists).

Much of his artwork has been destroyed in subsequent decades by kar seva babas and their destructive renovations on Sikh heritage sites, which Gian Singh had expressed worry about before his passing.

His documentation of creating a mural as per the traditional Sikh school can be found within his Naqqashi Darpan work. It has been both subsequently translated and narrated by his grandson, Surinder Singh. Much of the corpus of artwork produced by Gian Singh have been published in Sikh and Punjabi periodicals, such as Preet Lari, Ajit, Veer Bharat, Sher-e-Bharat and other publications.

His descendants are mulling setting up a digital repository of Gian Singh's artwork that will be available to the general masses. They plan to help revive the traditional Sikh school of art through such an endeavor. His artwork remains a subject of study by experts in the field and a panel has been formed for this regard.

"He (Bhai Gian Singh Naqqash) focused all his attention and worked very hard like doing meditation and wonderful naqqashi created by him with his art are like attaining spiritual enlightenment."

— Harinder Singh "Roopi", translated by Davinder Aujla (Mohali)

R. P. Srivastava compared the influence of Bhai Gian Singh on Sikh and Punjabi art to that of Bhai Vir Singh and Dhani Ram Chatrik in Sikh and Punjabi poetry.

Some works by Gian Singh Naqqash are preserved at the Sikh Research Centre of the Khalsa College, Amritsar. He was the only Sikh naqqash artist to leave behind groundbreaking books covering painting, including the naqqashi method.

== Books ==
=== Bibliography ===
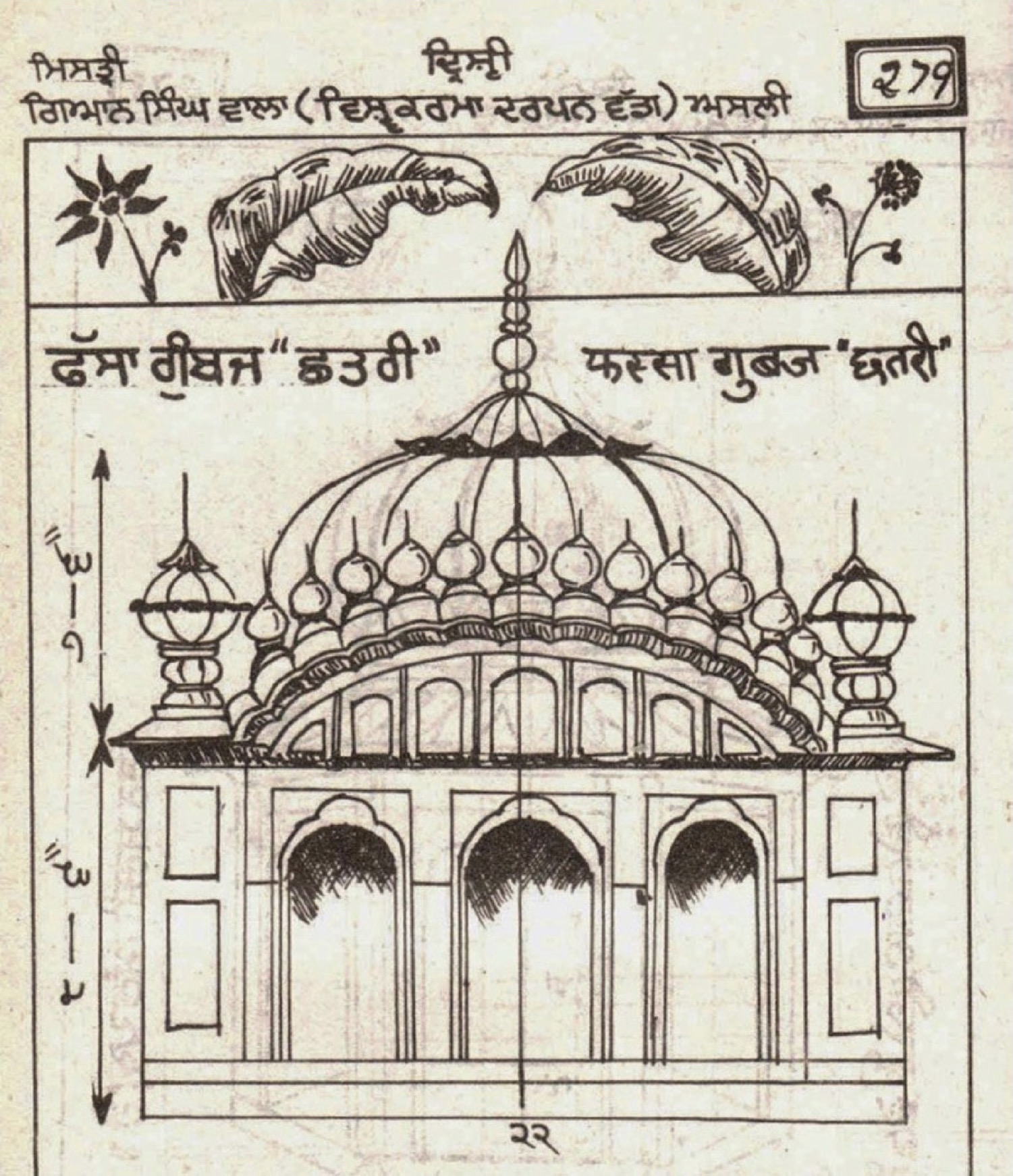
- Architectural sketch depicting a dome design by Gian Singh Naqqash from page 279 of his book, Vishkarma Darpan, ca.1926
  Naqqashi Darpan (1924), covering natural art motifs and designs involving flora, such as flowers, and animals
- Visva Karma Darpan or Vishkarma Darpan (1926), covering decorative, architectural, and furniture designs
- Naqqashi Art Shiksha or Nikashi Art Sikhya (1942), sketches to instruct novices on how to draw
- Taj-i-Zargari (Vol.I in 1920 and Vol.II in 1930), about artwork involving gold and silver ornaments, 1539 designs in-total
- Kasheeda, about executing naqsha artwork on shawls and other fabric types

=== Others ===
- Gian Chitravali: Masterpieces of the Late Bhai Gian Singh Naqqash (written by G. S. Sohan Singh) - 1956

== Honours ==
- Banarsi Siropa - Shiromani Gurdwara Parbandhak Committee (1949)

== Gallery ==
=== Mural (Naqqashi) ===
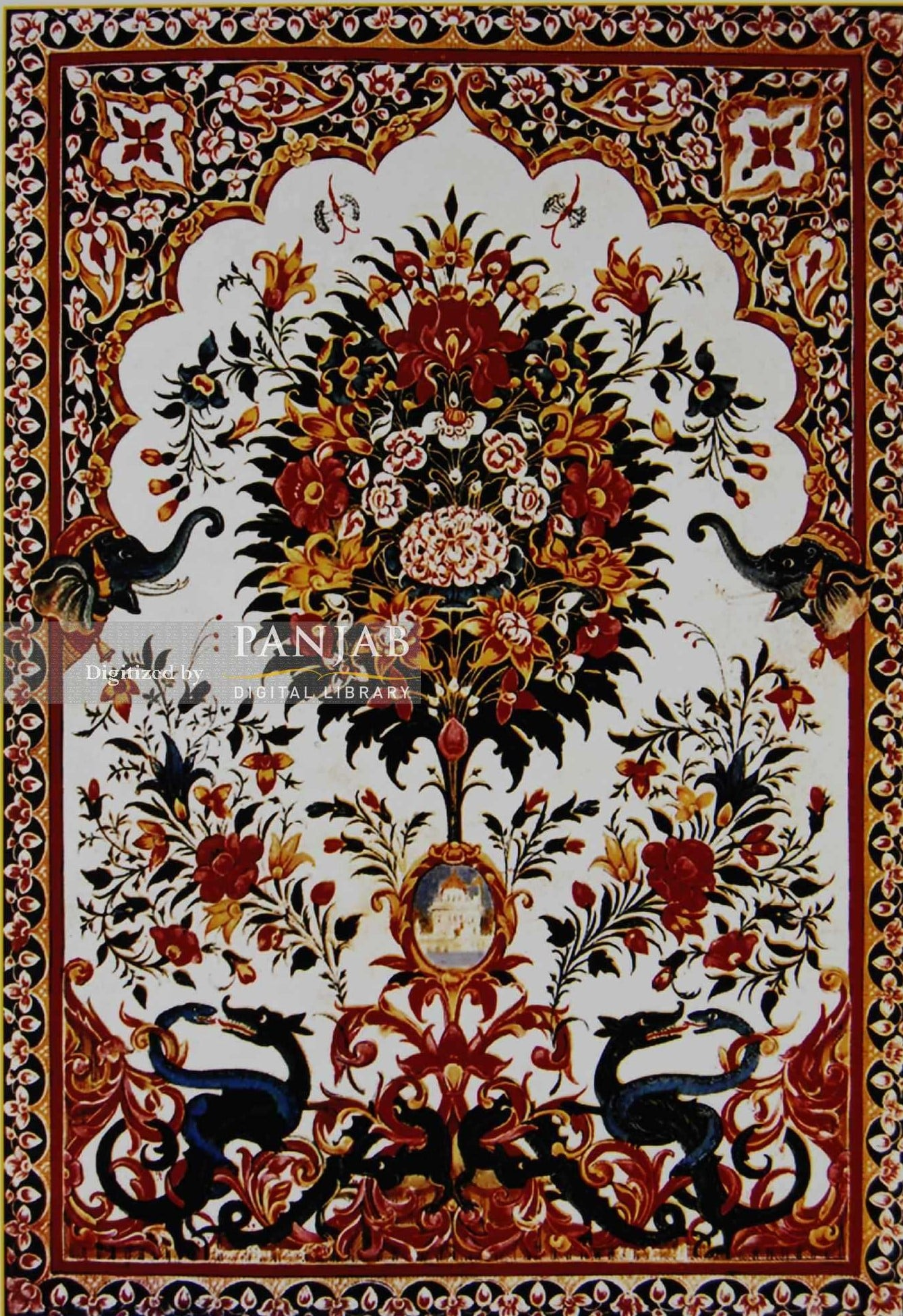
Fresco of floral and animal motifs and the building structure from the walls of original Akal Takht complex, by Gian Singh Naqqash, ca.1942 (destroyed in the mid-1980's)

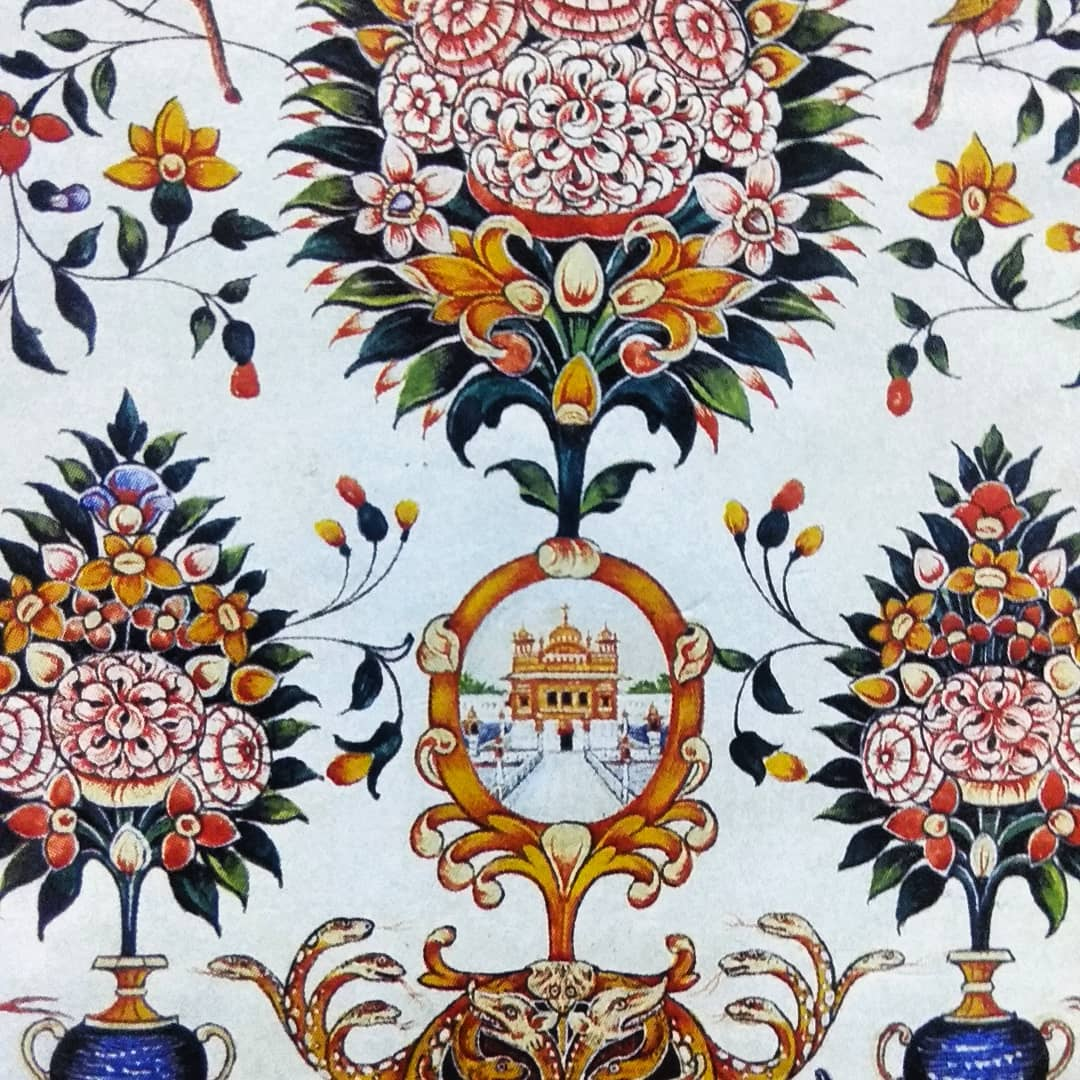
Mural of decorative floral motifs with a representation of the Golden Temple at-centre, by Gian Singh Naqqash

=== Miniatures ===
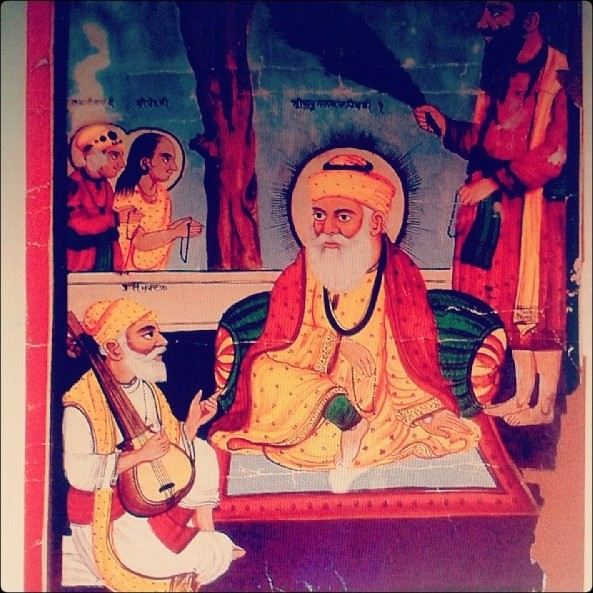
Painting of Guru Nanak seated under a tree in the presence of Bhai Bala, Bhai Mardana, and his two sons (Sri Chand and Lakhmi Das), by Gian Singh Naqqash

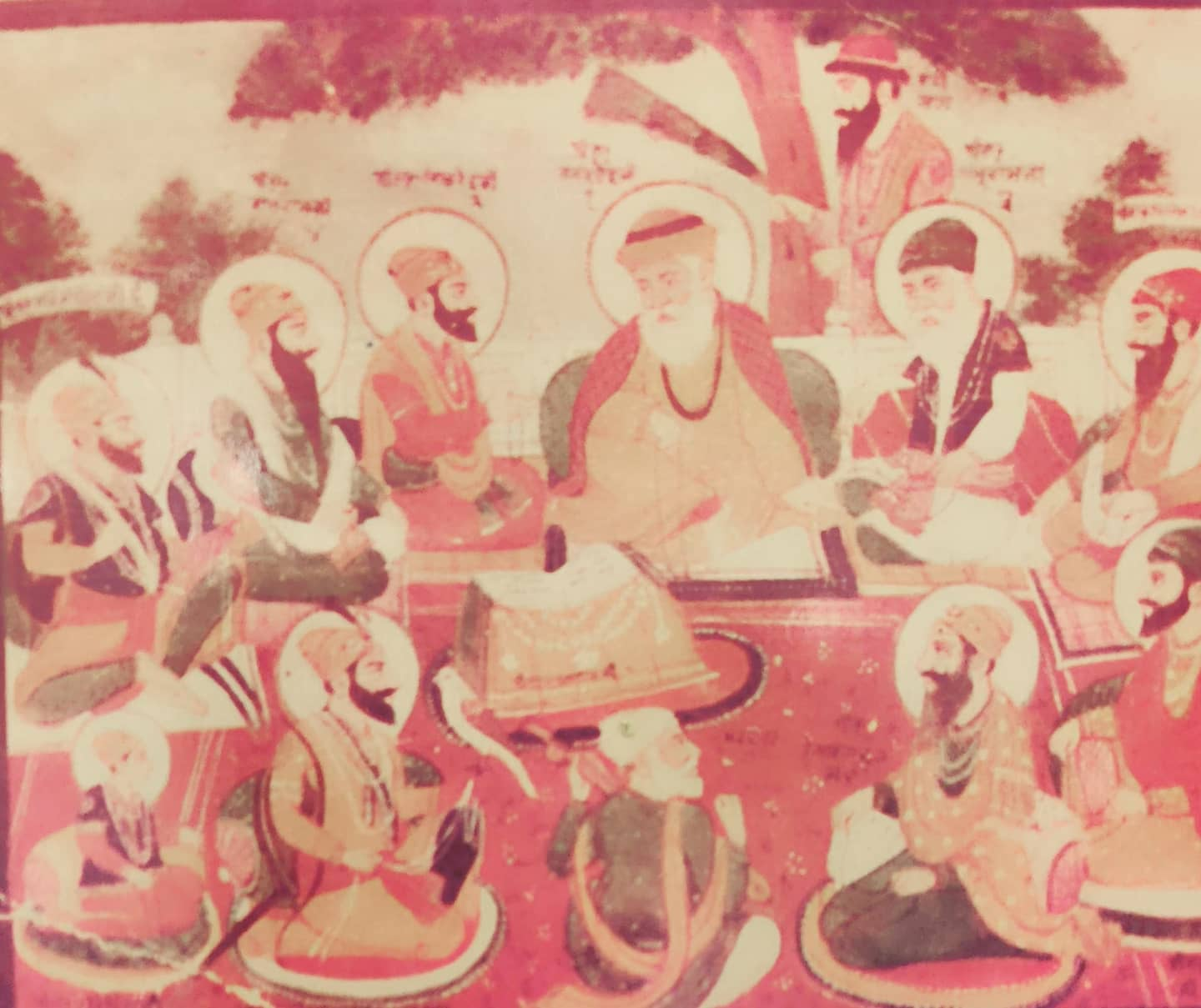
Painting of all the Sikh gurus together by Gian Singh Naqqash

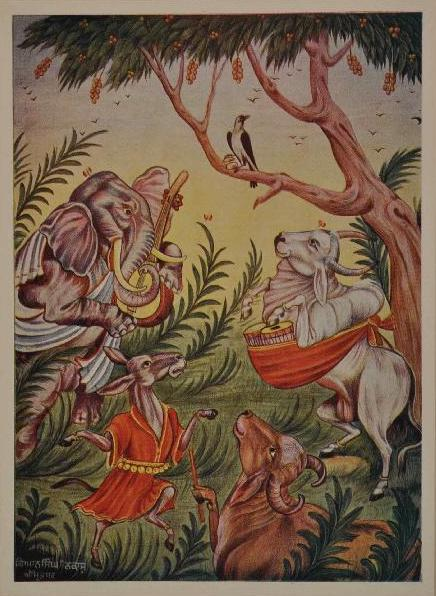
Types of Irreligion

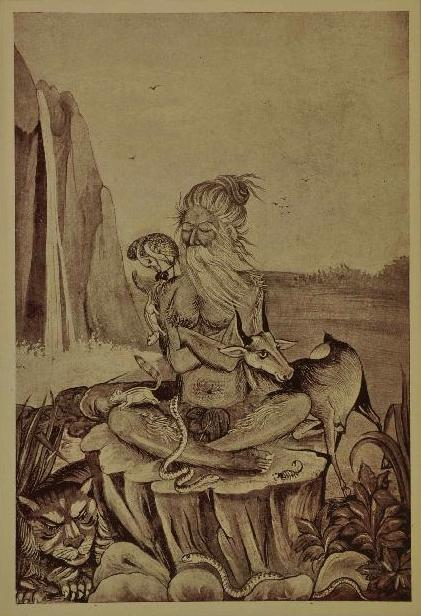
Samadhi

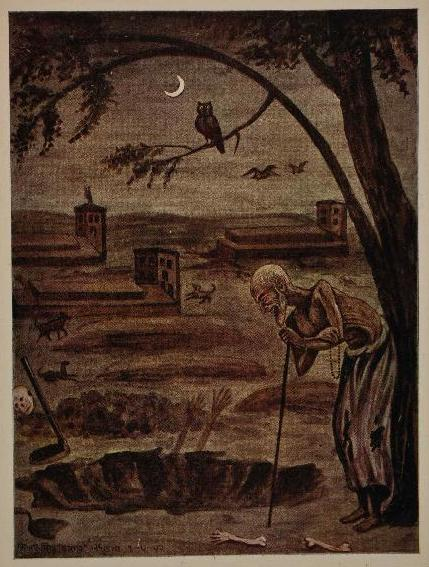
The Inviting Doom

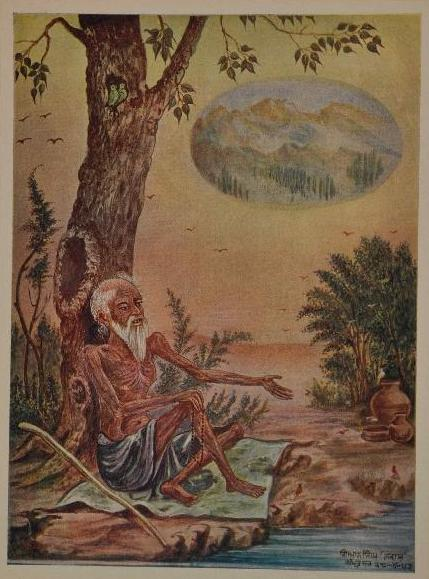
The Effect of Age

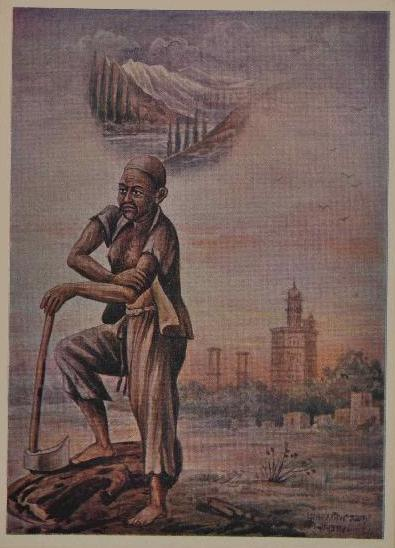
Memories of Homeland

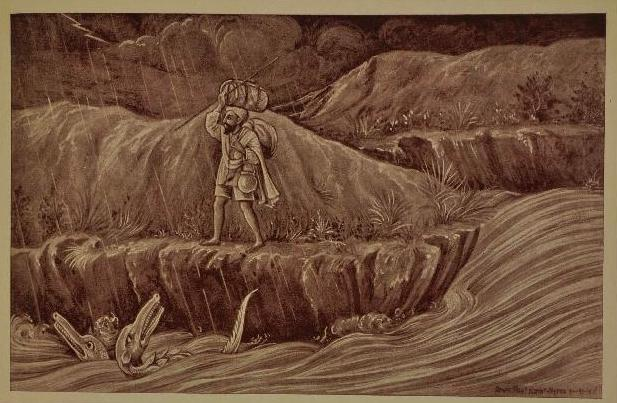
The Pilgrim

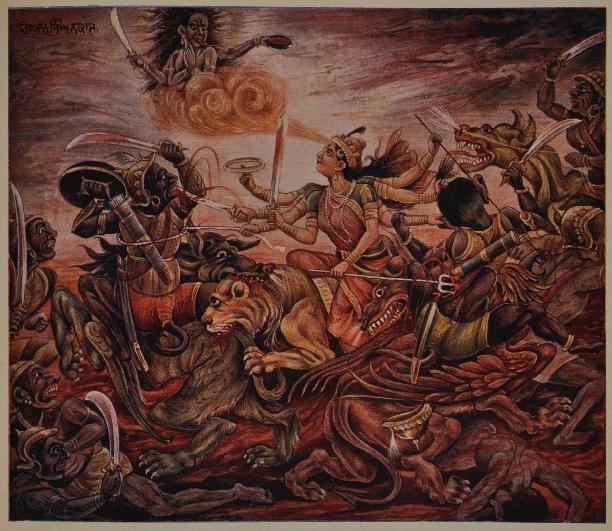
The Eternal Strife

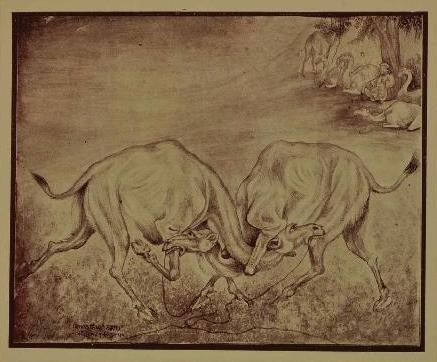
Camel Fight
