= Peacock dress of Lady Curzon =

Dress designed by Jean Philippe Worth

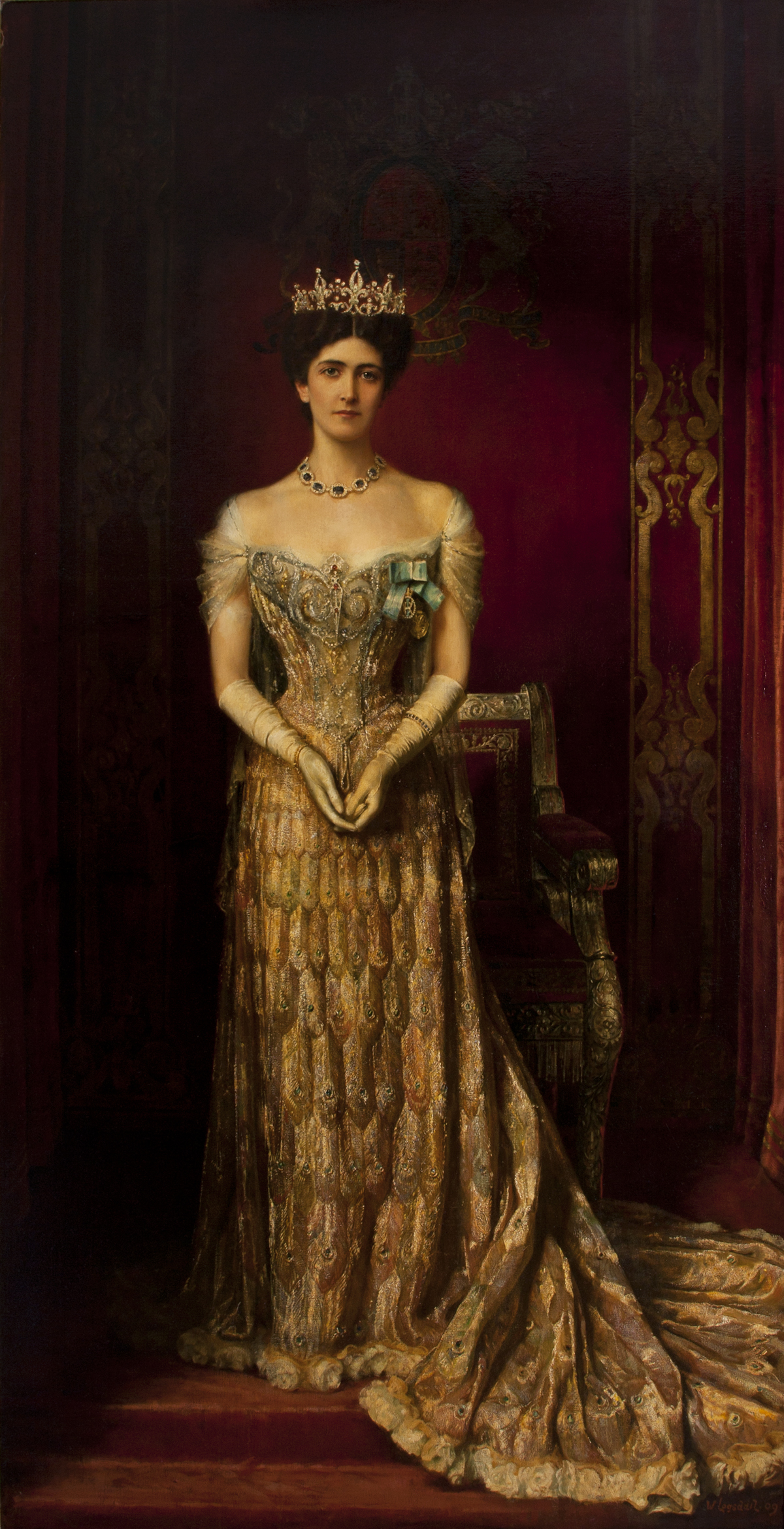
- Lady Curzon depicted in her peacock dress by William Logsdail, 1909
- Designer: Jean-Philippe Worth (design and assembly), Workshop of Kishan Chand, India (embroidery)
- Year: 1903
- Material: Silk taffeta; Indian cotton muslin; lace net, rhinestones, silk
- On display at: Kedleston Hall

The Peacock dress of Lady Curzon is a gown made of gold and silver thread embroidered by the Workshop of Kishan Chand (India), and designed by Jean-Philippe Worth for Mary Curzon, Baroness Curzon of Kedleston to celebrate the 1902 Coronation of King Edward VII and Queen Alexandra at the second Delhi Durbar in 1903. It is today kept at Kedleston Hall, Derbyshire, as part of its collection.

The dress features a design representing the feathers of a peacock, a symbol of great significance in Indian culture and the Hindu religion, on a fabric traditionally worn by Mughal court rulers. Lady Curzon's dress was a reference to the Peacock Throne that originally stood in the Diwan-I-Khas palace, where the ball took place. This dazzling jewelled throne, now lost, was made for Shah Jahan in the early 17th century but was looted during the Persian invasion of Nader Shah in 1739. A replica throne was destroyed in 1857 when the British commandeered the Red Fort as a garrison in the Indian Rebellion of 1857.

The gown was assembled from panels of chiffon that had been embroidered and embellished by skilled craftsmen in the Workshop of Kishan Chand in India, using the zardozi (gold wire weaving) method (the technique takes its name from the densely worked metal thread; zar (gold) and dozi (work)). It was then shipped to Paris, where the House of Worth styled the dress with a long train edged with white chiffon roses. The worked panels were overlapping peacock feathers that had a blue-green beetle wing at the centre. Over time, the metal thread in the dress has tarnished but the beetle wings have not lost their lustre. The gown weighs over 4.5 kilograms (9.9 lb).

The Viceroy, Lord Curzon, organised the second Delhi Durbar in 1903 to celebrate the 1902 coronation of King Edward VII, "the grandest pageant in history", which created a tremendous sensation, and served as a symbol of British rule over India. The dress was featured in a Chicago Tribune article because Lady Curzon was from Chicago. State portraits were ordered from the artist William Logsdail, but Lady Curzon's portrait was completed in 1909 after her death in 1906. The peacock dress is preserved, together with the Logsdail portrait, at Kedleston Hall.

Lady Curzon was instrumental in promoting the use of Indian embroidery in Western fashion, and many of her friends ordered gowns from Worth using such decorations, though they generally used much less metal threadwork which weighed her dress down. Another of her embroidered court dresses, assembled by the House of Worth in 1903, is on display at the Fashion Museum, Bath.

== Gallery ==
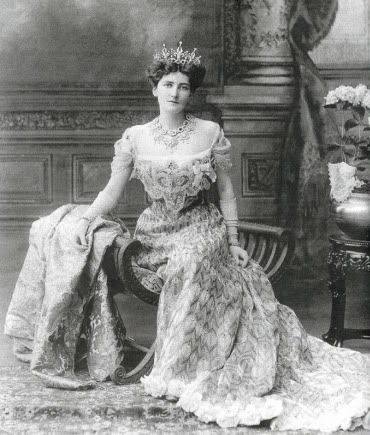
Albert Edward Jeakins, 1903, Lady Curzon wearing the peacock dress.

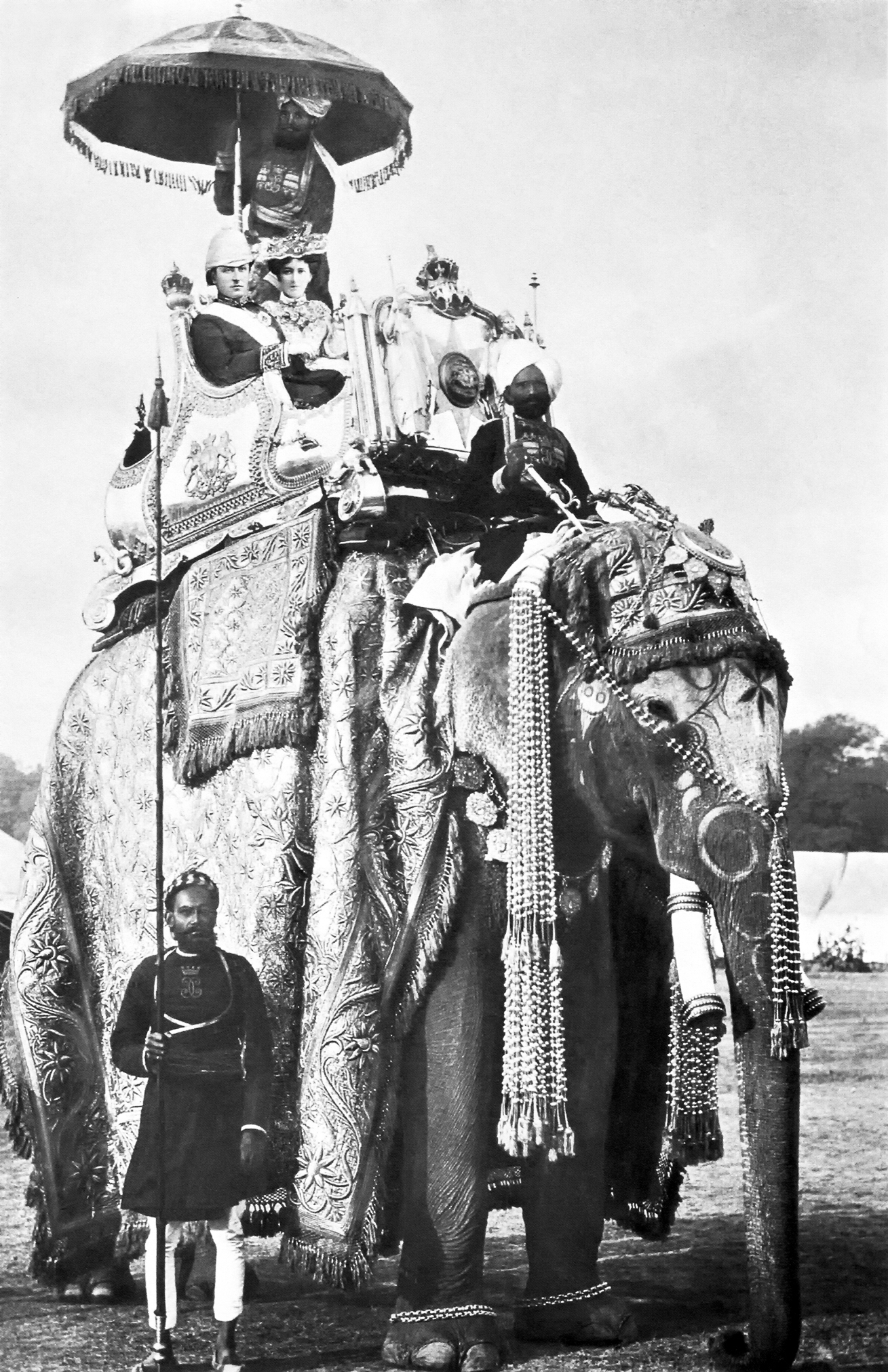
Lord and Lady Curzon arriving at the Delhi Durbar in 1903

== See also ==
- List of individual dresses
