= G. S. Sohan Singh =

Indian artist (1914-1999)

- Photograph of the late G.S. Sohan Singh taken by his son, Satpal Singh 'Danish'
- Born: August 1914; Amritsar, Punjab, British India
- Died: 28 February 1999 (aged 84)
- Organization: G. S. Sohan Singh Artist Memorial Trust
- Known for: Sikh artist
- Children: Surinder Singh (son); Satpal Singh "Danish" (son); Hardeep Singh (grandson)
- Father: Gian Singh Naqqash
- Website: art-heritage.com

G. S. Sohan Singh (August 1914–28 February 1999) was an Indian artist who specialized as an oil-colourist. He was an influential Sikh artist who developed the Sikh school of oil-paintings, realism, and block-making.

== Biography ==
Sohan Singh was born in August 1914 in Amritsar, Punjab Province, British India (now Punjab, India). He was the son of artist Gian Singh Naqqash and an apprentice of Hari Singh. He attended school at Government High School, Amritsar up to the middle standard. He had been instructed in the traditional Sikh school of art by his father, Gian Singh, but instead Sohan Singh opted for working with oil on canvas despite this education. He was also taught the Pahari (particularly the Kangra variety) and Mughal schools of painting. In 1932, he painted a now famous portrait of Banda Singh Bahadur which was a massive success with the public and jump-started his career as an artist. He painted hundreds of portraits of famous Sikh personalities which includes portraits Guru Ram Das, Guru Nanak Dev, Jassa Singh Ramgarhia, and Bhai Kanhaiya. His style of painting was realistic, with focus on landscapes, Indian monuments, portraits, and imaginative subjects.

== Legacy and family ==
He had two sons, named Surinder Singh (born 1938) and Satpal Singh "Danish" (born 1949), the latter of whom is outspoken on the conservation of Sikh art heritage. Surinder Singh was old enough to remember seeing his grandfather, Gian Singh, at work. Surinder Singh learnt about block printing (specifically in monochrome and tri-colour) with his father, Sohan Singh. Surinder Singh would go on to become a successful and accomplished artist and photographer in his own regard. Surinder Singh was also active in preserving the art heritage produced and mastered by his forebearers.

Satpal Singh 'Danish' became an accomplished photographic journalist working for the press, taking pictures of and documenting many historical events, such as Operation Blue Star, Operation Black Thunder, and the Punjab Insurgency. He became a realistic painter like his father, Sohan. Furthermore, he creates poetry in the Punjabi-language and also is an author for Punjabi-language newspaper publications.

Sohan's grandson, Hardeep Singh, is continuing the family legacy and is a painter as well, with an interest also in Gurmukhi calligraphy. Hardeep Singh creates calligraphy in the traditional scriptio continua method of writing Gurmukhi, with the endonym term being larivaar. He also has created his own font set and written literature on Punjabi and Gurmukhi calligraphy.

The G. S. Sohan Singh Artist Memorial Trust is his namesake organization which was founded by his sons and grandson for the purpose of promoting the Sikh school of art.

A granddaughter, Kirandeep Kaur, has authored two Punjabi books, one being on Sohan Singh and his legacy, Darvesh Chitrakar (2015) on G. S. Sohan Singh, and Hastakhar on Bhai Jaswant Singh, a "Hazoori Ragi".

== Books ==
- Gian Chitravali: Masterpieces of the Late Bhai Gian Singh Naqqash (1956)
- Revealing the Art of G.S. Sohan Singh (1971)
- Amritsar – The Sacred City of the Sikhs
- Holy Places of Pilgrimage

== List of paintings ==
| Name of painting | Description | Year of creation | References |
|---|---|---|---|
| Sardar Jassa Singh Ramgarhia | Equestrian depiction of Jassa Singh Ramgarhia in-battle | 1961 | |
| Sant Kartar Singh Bhindran Wale | Seated depiction of Kartar Singh leader of the Damdami Taksal | 1978 | |
