= Dina Portway Dobson-Hinton =

English archaeologist and caver (1885 – 1968)

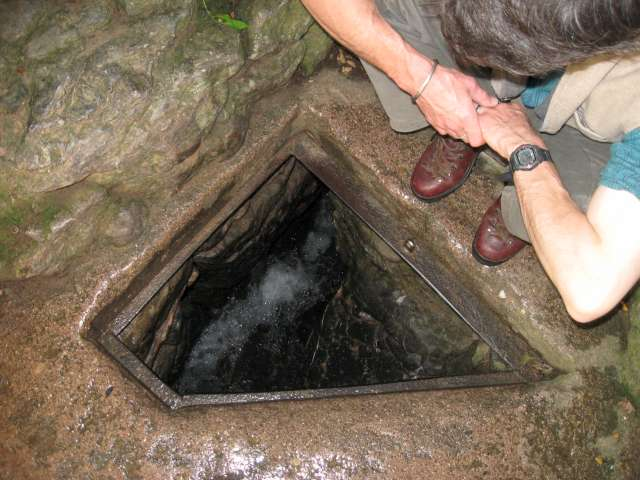
Dina Portway Dobson-Hinton was the first woman to descend the 40-foot pot at Swildon's Hole in the Mendip Hills in 1922

Dina Portway Dobson-Hinton FSA (1885 – 1968) was an English archaeologist and pioneering caver. As well as teaching and writing on prehistory and ancient history, she explored caves in the Mendip Hills and advocated for women in the magistracy.

== Early life and education ==
She was born Dina Portway on 3 March 1885, the eldest of six children of stove manufacturer H. Portway. Educated at Bedford High School, she studied history at Newnham College, Cambridge between 1903 and 1906. Cambridge did not award degrees to women at that time, but she received her Litt.D. from Trinity College Dublin.

Between 1906 and 1910, she taught at the High Schools of Edgbaston and Manchester.

== Caving ==
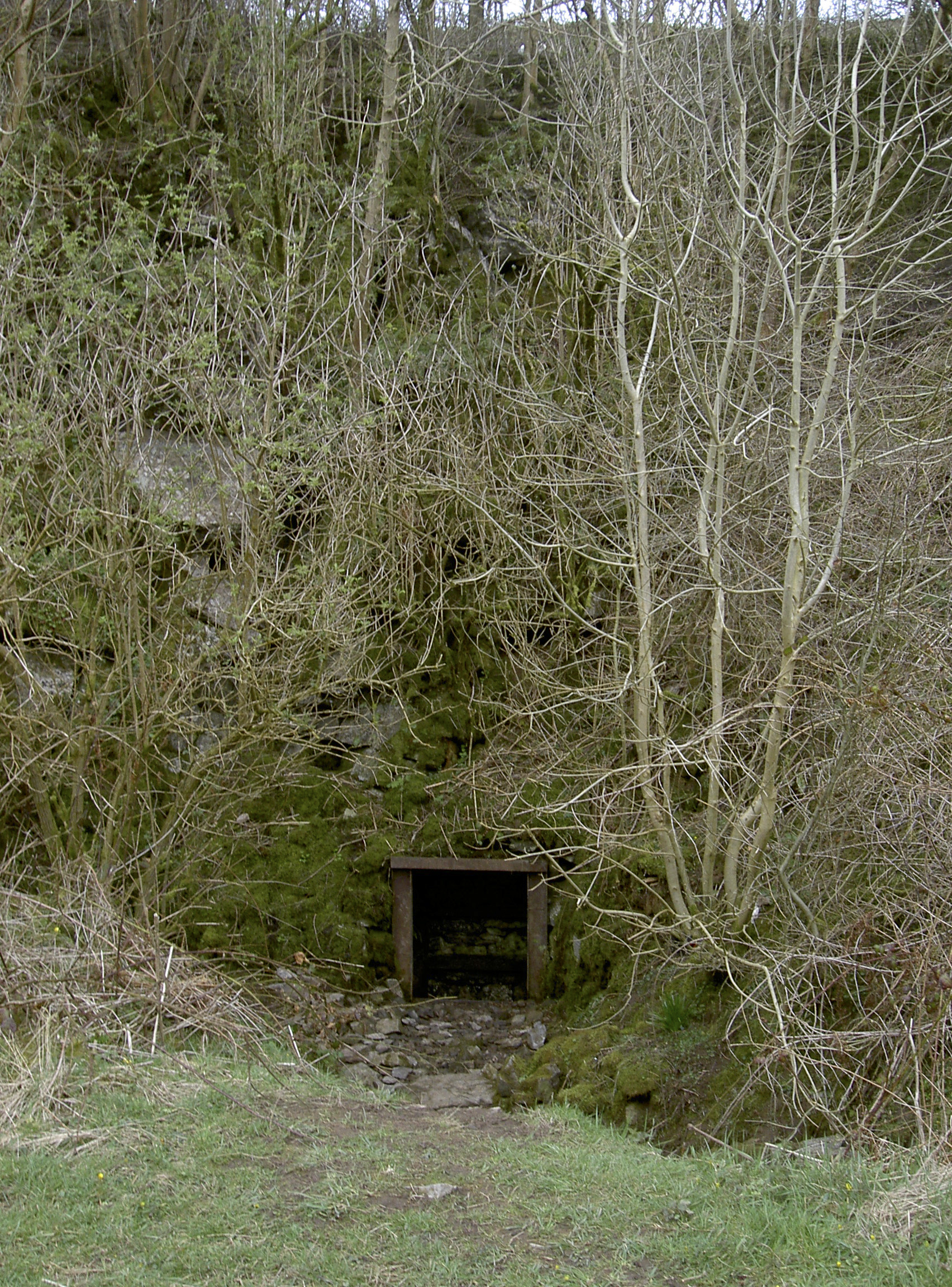
The entrance to Eastwater Cavern

Dobson-Hilton was reported to be the first woman to descend Eastwater Cavern in 1920 and the first woman to descend the forty-foot pot in Swildon's Hole in 1922. She served as President of the Axbridge Archaeological Society and Caving Group.

== Archaeology ==
Dobson-Hinton wrote several works on prehistory and ancient history, her most notable being The Archaeology of Somerset (1931), and she was a prolific contributor to articles and reviews in journals. From 1926 she gave radio talks on prehistoric archaeology. She was elected Fellow of the Society of Antiquaries in 1934.

During World War Two, in advance of the digging of an anti-tank ditch to defend Wells, she excavated the area.

== Women in magistracy ==
Serving as Justice of the Peace for over thirty years (1937 – 1968) and on the Bristol City Council (1938 – 1947). In 1949, Dobson-Hilton toured Egypt, speaking about 'women in the British magistracy and women's institutes.' She was also President of a branch of the Soroptomists Club.

== Radio ==
Dobson-Hilton also became a radio broadcaster and scriptwriter for the BBC. She worked on the Schools radio series How Things Began and for the Home and Light Service.

== Personal life ==
She married, first, John Dobson a Greek professor the University of Bristol (who died in 1947) and second, Martin Hinton, a retired zoo keeper and palaeontologist who was one of the suspects in the Piltdown Man hoax (who died in 1961). She had six children, including prominent businessman Richard Dobson.

One obituary record states, "Her most important work was undoubtedly the inspiring of the younger generation." One of her protégés wrote in the Bristol Archaeological Research Group bulletin that "beginners turned naturally to her for advice. No one ever applied to her in vain."

== Select works ==
- The Archaeology of Somerset (1931)
- A Book of Prehistory (1933)
- A Book of Ancient History (1934)
- Early Man (1950)
- Clothing and Costume (1955)
