= Richard Dobson (businessman) =

English businessman

Sir Richard Portway Dobson (11 February 1914 - 24 October 1993) was an English businessman. He was one of the most prominent businesspeople in post-war Britain. He spent most of his career at British American Tobacco, where he rose to the position of executive chairman. He also served as chairman of British Leyland.

== Life and career ==
=== Early life and career ===
Dobson was born in Bristol, the son of John Frederic Dobson (1875-1947), a professor of Greek at the University of Bristol, and Dr Dina (Portway) Dobson (1885-1968), an archaeologist. He was educated at Clifton College.

Dobson graduated from King's College, Cambridge with an honours degree in Classics. Dobson was persuaded by his father that academic life was financially unrewarding, and as he was keen to see the world, he joined British American Tobacco (BAT), with a reference from his college bursar, John Maynard Keynes. Keynes advised the young Dobson not to take the job unless his ambition was to become company chairman. Dobson worked for BAT in China as a marketer from 1936 to 1940. His time in China was characterised by the destruction of the Second Sino-Japanese War.

During the Second World War Dobson served as a Spitfire pilot in the Middle East, Italy and Burma, rising to the rank of flight lieutenant. Dobson wrote a recollection of his time in China, which was published by Macmillan as China Cycle in 1946.

Dobson returned to BAT after the war, resuming work in China until 1950. He was assigned to manage the Rhodesian subsidiary from 1953 to 1955. He returned to London and was appointed to the board of directors in 1955.

Dobson became deputy chairman from 1962, during which time he became primarily involved with Brown & Williamson, BAT's American tobacco subsidiary. Brown & Williamson held around 20 percent of the United States tobacco market and was regarded as the "jewel in the crown" of the company.

Dobson was appointed as the sole vice-chairman from 1968, during which time he was principally responsible for reorganising BAT's cosmetics businesses, including Yardley, Lenthéric and Germaine Monteil, and helping restore them to profitability.

=== Leadership roles in British industry and later life ===
Dobson was appointed chairman and de facto chief executive of British American Tobacco from 1970. BAT was the largest producer of tobacco products in the world, and the third largest company in Britain as measured by sales.

Dobson was considered one of Britain's ablest company executives. He was profiled in The Times as a modest but intelligent man, described by an acquaintance as able to, "write a thesis with one hand, and wield a sword in the other". Physically he was "a burly pipe smoker with the build of a front-row [rugby] forward".

The historic exclusive trading area agreement with Imperial Tobacco was ended in 1973, which allowed BAT to market its tobacco products in Britain for the first time. BAT aggressively targeted the British cigarette market, initially with its State Express 555 brand.

Growth prospects in tobacco were limited by growing public health concerns, so Dobson continued a BAT policy of diversification that had begun in the early 1960s. He steered BAT into the retail market, acquiring a stake in Horten AG, control of Kohl's, International Stores and Gimbels.

Dobson served as a non-executive director of Exxon Corporation from 1975 until 1984.

Dobson received a knighthood in January 1976.

Dobson retired as chairman of BAT to become chairman of British Leyland from February 1976. He remained involved with BAT, where he held the position of non-executive president. According to Dobson he took on the job as head of one of Britain's most important yet troubled industrial companies out of "a sense of public duty".

Dobson resigned as chairman of British Leyland in 1977 (18 months in office) after a socialist activist recorded him using the term "wog" as a racial epithet at a private dinner. Dobson argued that the comment was taken out of context and conveyed a "totally false impression of his personal and social attitudes and business ethics".

In his later years, Dobson would describe himself, self-effacingly, as a "retired tobacconist and a failed motor manufacturer". He died in 1993.
