= Zardozi =

Type of embroidery using metal wire

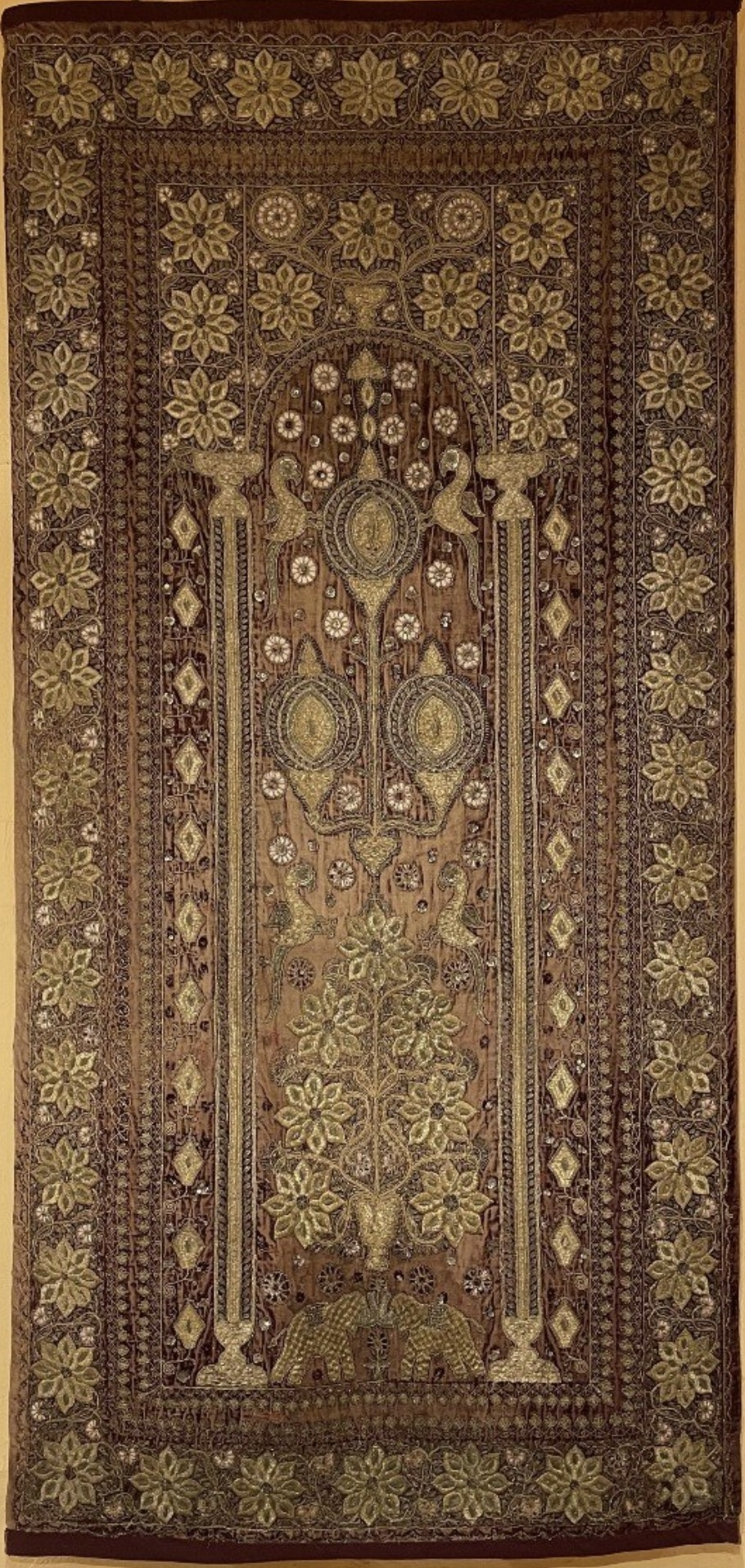
Monumental Indo-Portuguese zardozi velvet panel from Gujarat/Surat, Mughal India, c. 1700–1730. Beatriz de Luna Art Collection, Portugal.

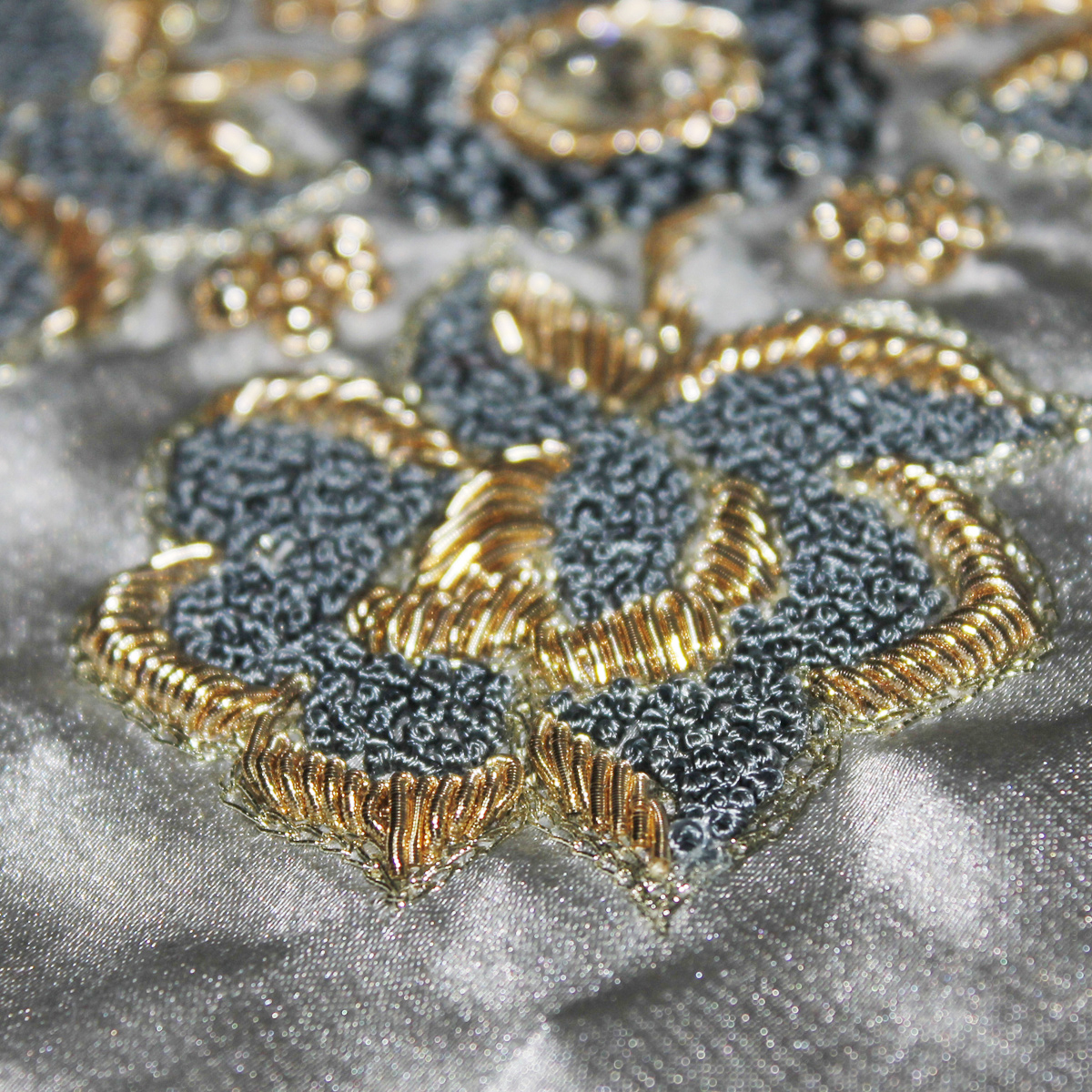
Close-up shoot of zardozi (zardouzi) embroidery

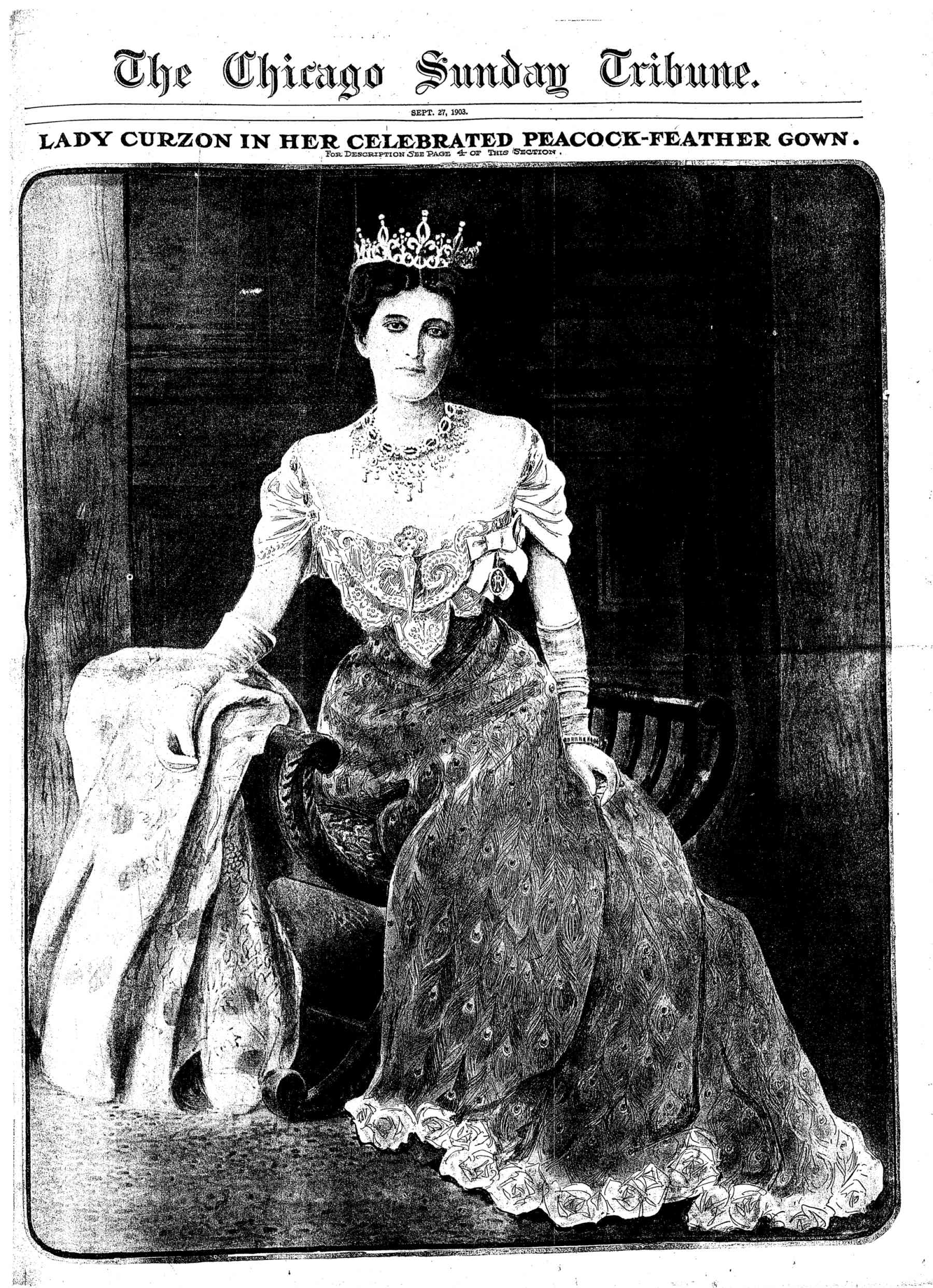
Vicereine Lady Curzon's peacock dress, with a skirt made of Indian zardozi needlework featuring green beetle wings and gold and silver thread, was a sensation at her coronation, making the front page of the Chicago Tribune on 27 September 1903.

Zardozi, or zar-douzi or zarduzi (from Classical Persian زَردوزی zardōzī, literally "gold embroidery"; Modern Persian: زَردوزی, romanized: zarduzi; Hindi: ज़रदोज़ी, Tajik: зардӯзӣ, Urdu: زردوزی, Uzbek: zardoʻzi), is an Iranian, Indian-subcontinent and Central Asian embroidery type. Zardozi comes from two Persian words: zar or zarin meaning 'gold', and dozi meaning 'sewing'. Zardozi is a type of heavy and elaborate metal embroidery on a silk, satin, or velvet fabric base. Zardozi embroidery uses a wide variety of gold and silver embellishments, including flattened wire (badla), coiled and zig-zag wire (salma, nakshi and dabka), flat metallic thread (tilla), cotton thread wrapped with gold strip (kasab) and sequins (sitara). Designs are often created using gold and silver threads and can incorporate pearls, beads, and precious stones. It is used as decoration for a wide range of applications, including clothes, household textiles, and animal trappings. Historically, it was used to adorn the walls of royal tents, scabbards, wall hangings and the paraphernalia of regal elephants and horses.

Initially, the embroidery was done with pure silver wires and real gold leaves. However, today, craftsmen make use of a combination of copper wire, with a golden or silver polish, and silk thread.

== Iran ==
Zardozi is an important handicraft in Persian culture. It is known around the country by names such as zar-douzi (Persian: زردوزی), kam-douzi (Persian: کم‌دوزی), gol-douzi (Persian: گل‌دوزی) and kaman-douzi (Persian: کمان‌دوزی). Nowadays it is more popular in Hormozgan, especially in Bandar-e Lenge, Bandar-e Abbas, and Minab.

Persian zardozi is of three kinds:

- Some people completely sew the basic fabric with Bakhie (Persian: بخیه) in order to produce novel patterns and colors, such as the Baloch's Souzan-douzi (Persian: سوزن‌دوزی), Rasht's Qollab-douzi (Persian: قلاب‌دوزی) and Kerman's Pate-douzi (Persian: پَته‌دوزی).
- Some sew with less density of work on the original fabric. They cross the strings throughout the woof of the fabric and sew them to each other to form a colorfully patterned lattice, such as sekke-douzi (Persian: سکّه‌دوزی) or qollab-douzi (Persian: قلاب‌دوزی) in Isfahan.
- A third way is to sew a variety of patterns on the original fabric with gold and silver strings, such as Dah-Yek-Douzi (Persian: ده‌يک‌دوزی), Naqade-douzi (Persian: نقده‌دوزی), Tafte-douzi (Persian: تافته‌دوزی), Kous-douzi (Persian: خوس‌دوزی) Zari-douzi (Persian: زر‌دوزی) or Golabatoun-douzi (Persian: گلابتون‌دوزی).

== Indian subcontinent ==
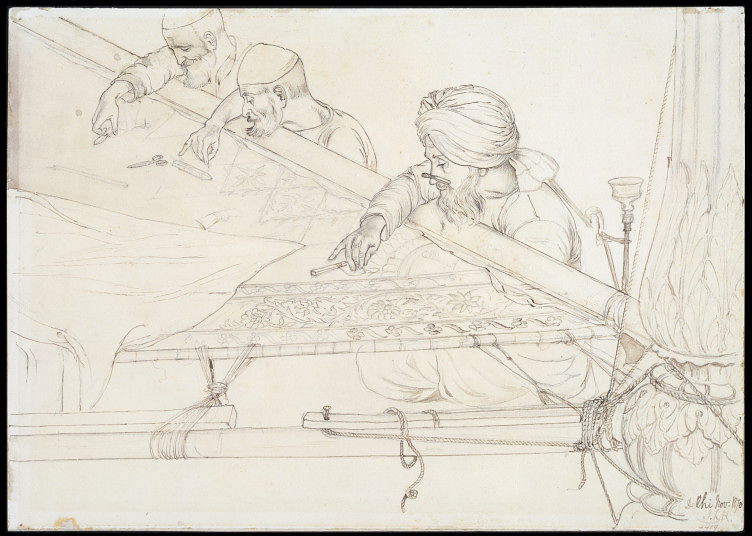
Drawing of Delhi gold embroiderers at work in 1870, by John Lockwood Kipling

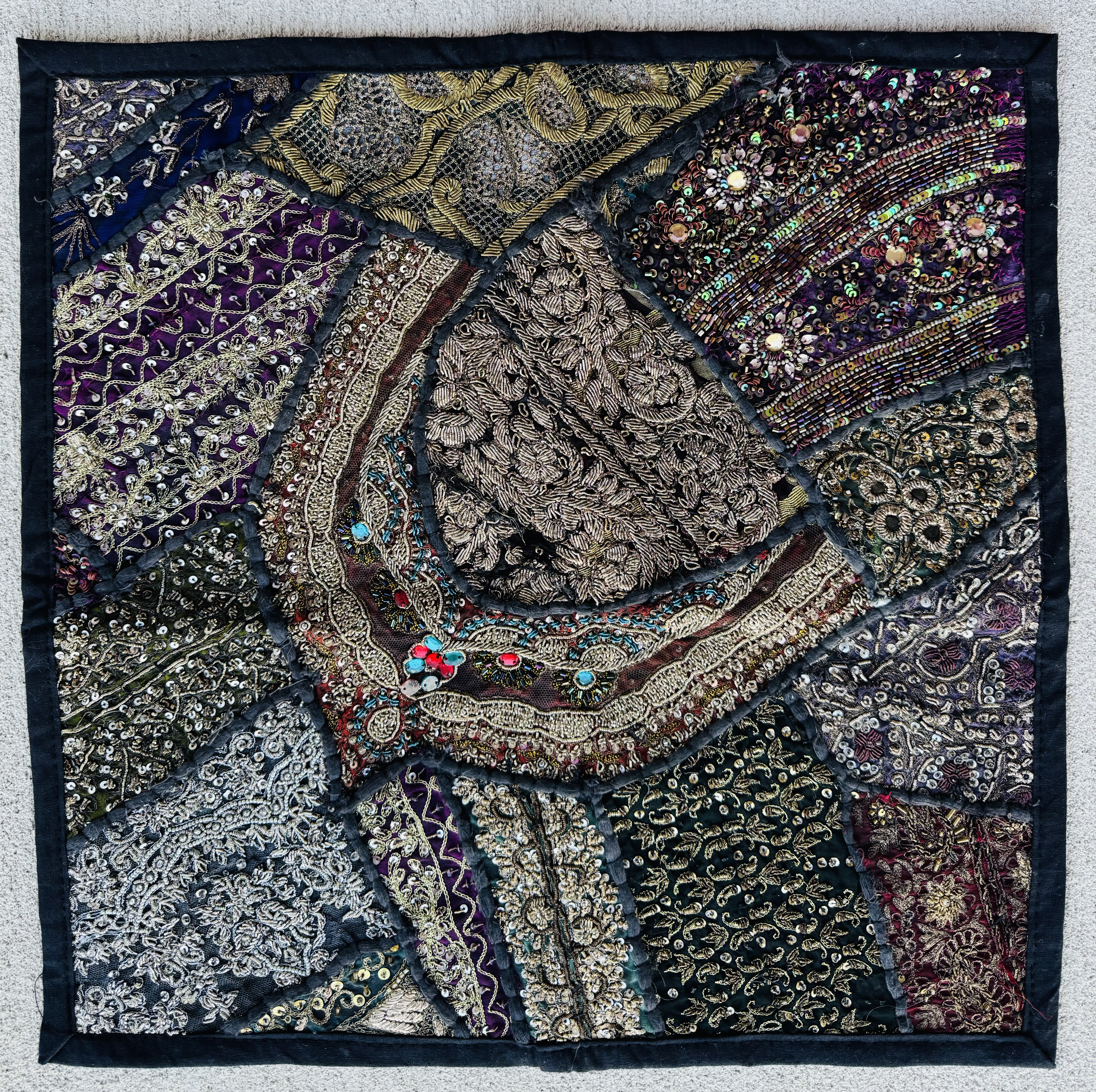
Zari tapestry

As an embroidery, zardozi was first used in the 14th century. It prospered during the 17th century during the reign of the Mughal empire, but later a loss of royal patronage and industrialization led to its decline. The craft is often called "zari" and began to experience a resurgence in popularity following India's independence in 1947. Today, it is one of the most popular embroideries found on the Indian subcontinent.

Zardozi and chikan were historically favored by Mughal elites; products made in these styles symbolized wealth, power and status. The Zardozi production was often associated with a courtly culture and commonly found on handicrafts throughout the country. This craft is practiced throughout India, from major cities like Kolkata, Delhi, Mumbai, to smaller centers such as Agra, Bareilly, and Farrukhabad, and historic regions like Lucknow, Hyderabad, and Bhopal. In 2013, the Geographical Indication Registry (GIR) accorded Geographical Indication (GI) registration to the Lucknow zardozi. With GI status, zardozi artisans, distributors, and retailers in Lucknow and the six surrounding districts of Barabanki, Unnao, Sitapur, Rae Bareli, Hardoi and Amethi can become authorized users of the "Lucknow zardozi" brand and carry a unique mark of authenticity.

Zardozi is a popular embroidery choice across Pakistan especially for wedding or formal wear, with artisans and couture houses alike producing clothing with zardozi work

== Central Asia ==
Zardozi has also been present in Tajikistan and Uzbekistan since ancient times.
