= Lenthéric =

French cosmetics and perfume company

Lenthéric, Inc.
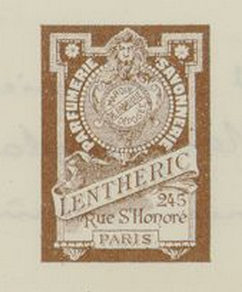
- Company type: Private
- Industry: Cosmetics, perfumes
- Founded: 1875 (salon); 1924 (incorporated)
- Founder: Guillaume Lenthéric
- Products: Perfumes, cosmetics, toilet preparations, hair spray, shampoo
- Owner: Shaneel Enterprises Ltd.

Lenthéric, Inc. is a manufacturer of perfumes, cosmetics, toilet preparations, hair spray, and shampoo.

== Corporate history ==
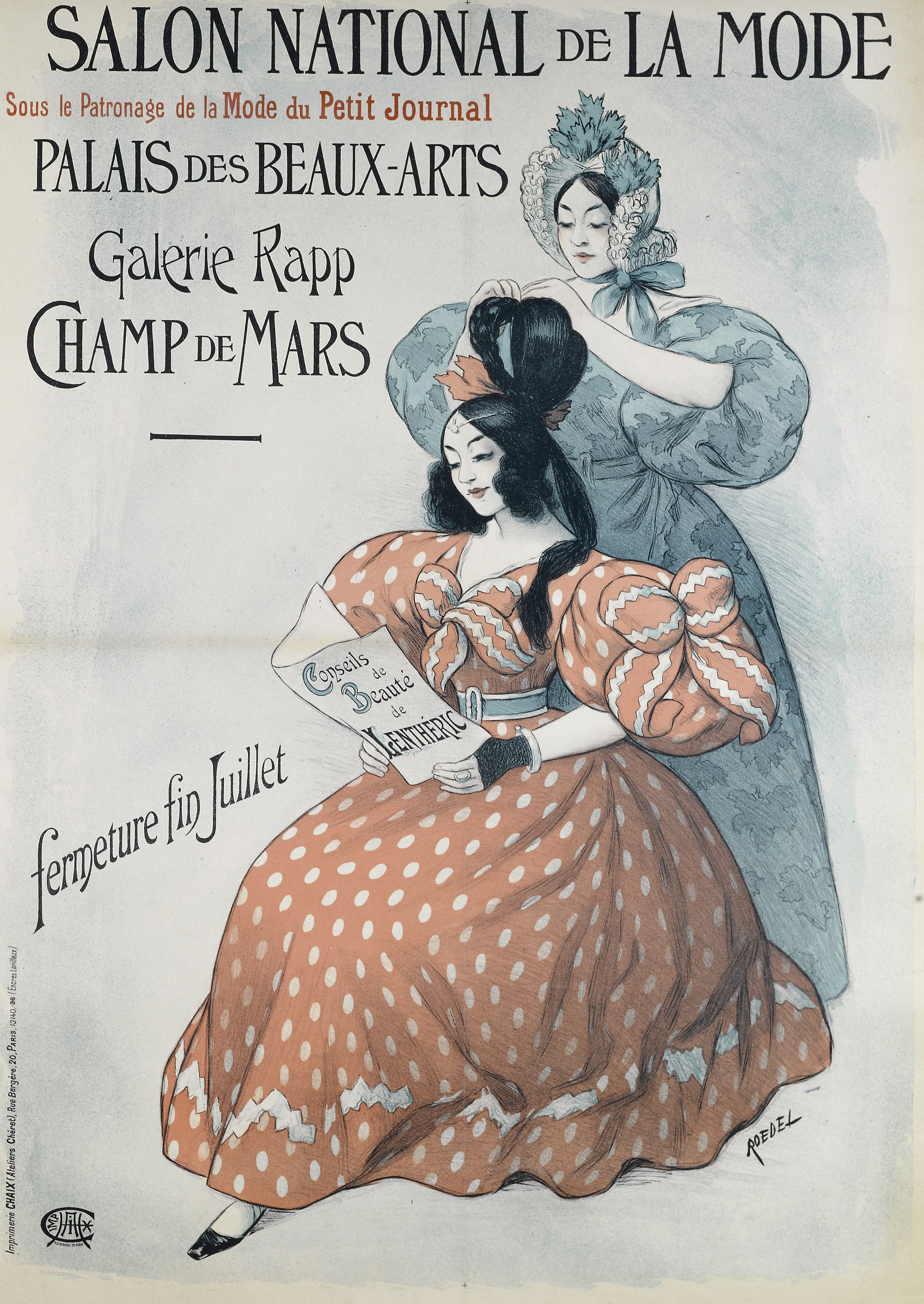
A lithographic poster promoting soins de beauté Lenthéric (Paris, before 1900).

The name of the company was taken from Guillaume Lenthéric, a French distiller and dispenser of perfumes in late 19th-century France. He operated a small salon in 245 rue Saint-Honoré in Paris, France, beginning in 1875. The firm was incorporated in 1924. Lenthéric became a subsidiary of Squibb, and was 90% controlled by the parent company in January 1942.

In 1947, Lenthéric, Inc., experienced a decline in earnings due to higher wages, advertising expenses, and vast returns of merchandise from retail stores, which trimmed inventories. In 1951, the company hoped to increase sales by introducing a new line of makeup called Sheer Beauty. It sold for less than $5. The firm also reduced the price of Debo deodorant from $1.35 to $1.00. This was accomplished by making the product in a plastic squeeze bottle rather than a glass bottle with atomizer.

Squibb had manufacturing plants in Brooklyn, New York and New Brunswick, New Jersey in July 1952. It controlled the Squibb Building at Fifth Avenue and 58th Street in New York City. The Olin Mathieson Chemical Corporation acquired Squibb in the late summer of 1952. Helene Curtis Industries, Inc., of Chicago, Illinois acquired the Lentheric, Inc., division of the Olin Mathieson Chemical Corporation in October 1956.

In 1990, Old Bond Street, 88.5% owned by Wasserstein Perella & Co., purchased Lenthéric and Yardley from SmithKline Beecham. In 1998, Old Bond Street collapsed, and Lenthéric was sold to Shaneel Enterprises Ltd.
