= List of Indian painters =

This is a list of notable painters from, or associated with, India. Please add only those artists that have Wikipedia articles. All others will be removed.

== A ==
- Amrita Sher-Gil
- Anjolie Ela Menon
- Abanindranath Tagore
- Amit Dutt (painter)

== B ==
- Bikash Bhattacharjee
- Bishan Singh
- Benode Bihari Mukherjee

== D ==
- Dinanath Dalal

== G ==
- Ganesh Pyne
- Gian Singh Naqqash
- Gulam Mohammed Sheikh
- Gaganendranath Tagore

== H ==
- M. F. Husain
- Haku Shah
- Hemendranath Majumdar
- Haren Das

== J ==
- Jamini Roy
- Jayant Parikh
- Jeeva

== K ==
- Kapur Singh
- Kehar Singh
- Kishan Singh
- K. G. Subramanyan
- Kaushik Saha

== M ==
- Manjit Bawa
- Manaku
- M. F. Hussain
- Manohar Kaul
- Milind Mulick

== N ==
- Nandalal Bose
- Narayan Shridhar Bendre
- Nainsukh
- Neel Pawan Baruah

== P ==
- Poornima Dayal

== R ==
- Raja Ravi Varma
- Rajesh Pullarwar
- A. Ramachandran
- Ramkinkar Baij
- Ratan Parimoo
- Rabindranath Tagore
- Ramananda Bandhyopadhay

== S ==
- Satish Gujral
- Shanti Dave
- Satyendra Pakhalé
- Sheesh Ram
- Sudip Roy
- Sujata Bajaj
- Sailoz Mookherjea
- Saroj Prakash Bandi
- Subrata Gangopadhay
- Sanatan Dinda
- Shuvaprasanna

== V ==
- Vasudeo Kamath

== Y ==
- Sushila Yawalkar, painter, sculptor and dancer
