= Sikh painting =

Indian pictorial art from Punjab region

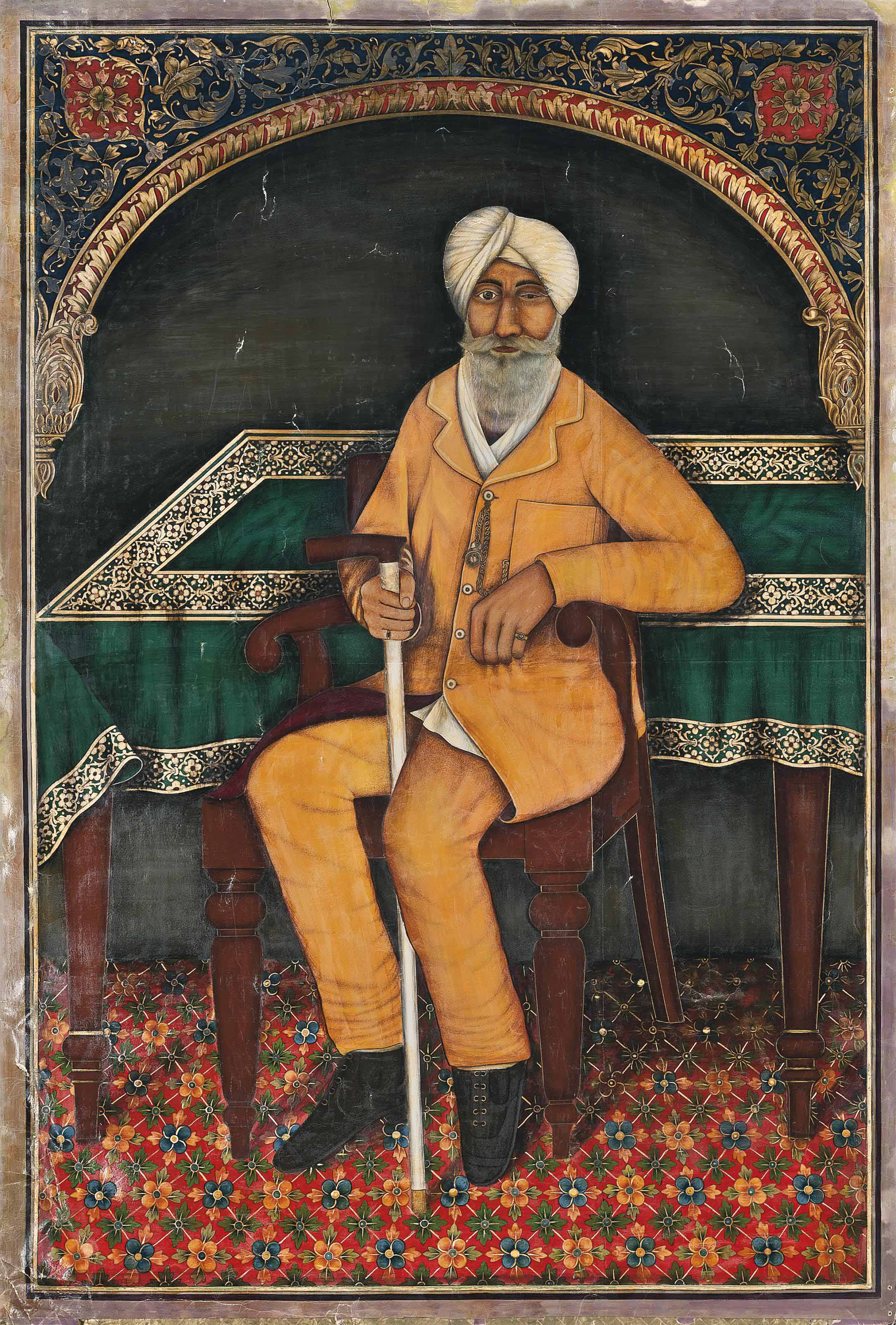
A large portrait of a Sikh nobleman, possibly Maharaja Ranjit Singh, circa 1900.

Sikh painting is a form of Sikh art style spread from Punjab Hills to the Punjab Plains which flourished between the 18th to 19th centuries. Major centres for the art school was Lahore, Amritsar, Patiala, Nabha, Kapurthala and Jind. Artists from surrounding regions migrated to Punjab seeking patronage for varying reasons. Most depicted scenes in Sikh painting are of Sikh gurus, portrait of chiefs of the states and court scenes. In the later period the artists painted popular traders of bazaar, such as cobbler carpenter, blacksmith etc. Considering the geographic boundaries were changing frequently in that period and the artists were generally migrants, there is always an overlap between Pahari styles such as Kangra and Guler with the Sikh style.

== History ==
Sikh painting style was majorly established in the 19th century and the artist of the style were not from Punjab but from surrounding regions. They either came looking for new commission or they were invited by the royal or aristocrats. W. G. Archer writes that at the start of the 19th century, Pahari painters were invited to paint portraits of Sikh rulers, nobility and influential families... Another group of painters migrated from Mughal Empire, after the slow decline of the empire there were no patrons to commission new works. There are records at the Sikh Court of Lahore which has names of several Pahari painters working there.

Main centres where the Sikh paintings flourished were Lahore, Amritsar, Patiala, Nabha, Kapurthala and Jind. Chiefs of these states became the patrons of miniature painting in the 19th century. Similar to the Mughal Empire, they also maintained well-trained group of artists and their atelier. Lahore was already a seat of Mughal Power, thus consisted of a group of calligraphers, architects and craftsman. Thus their state attracted more gifted artists to decorate the palaces with larger life size portraits. However, one of the biggest patrons of the style was Maharaja Ranjit Singh of Amritsar. Nainsukh a famous Pahari artist from the 18th century was associated with the Lahore Court and his descendent later painted several works for the Patiala artists years later. The records at the Sikh Court of Lahore include lists of several Pahari painters working there. Another historic event which brought famous artists of the Kangra court to the court of Maraja Ranjit Singh. when he defeated the Kangra rule Sansar Chand.

The style was discovered by Anand Coomaraswamy, Percy Brown and S. N. Dasgupta, in the middle of the twentieth century, in the streets of Amritsar and Lahore. More scholarship was developed on the subject in the second half of the century.

== Themes ==
The painting style which developed in 19th century was not a prototype of Pahari painting not it was highly influenced by the Mughal style and did not have the properties of the Awadhi style, which developed in Lucknow., it was more of an eclectic style where it had developed its own theme and characteristics inspired from the Sikh culture, although, the colour scheme and ornamentation styles of the earlier influences were retained.

Main themes of the Sikh school of the paintings were the, first religious Ten Sikh Gurus, set of Gurus and saints, Hindu Mythology; court paintings and feudal nature -portraits of chiefs of state and nobility, scenes from the court and portrait of European travellers residing in Amritsar and Lahore; secular paintings - hunting scene, flowers and foliage, farmers; and ethnological studies - scenes from the daily lives of people in bazaar such as workings of a cobbler, carpenter, oil mill maker, nihangs and blacksmiths. Most flourishing period for Sikh style was during the reign of Maharaja Ranjit Singh. He encouraged the artists to draw dignitaries and guests. It should be mentioned that several manuscripts were also developed in this style.

== Notable people ==
- Kehar Singh
- Bishan Singh
- Kishan Singh (fl. 19th century), Sikh painter
- Kapur Singh

== Gallery ==
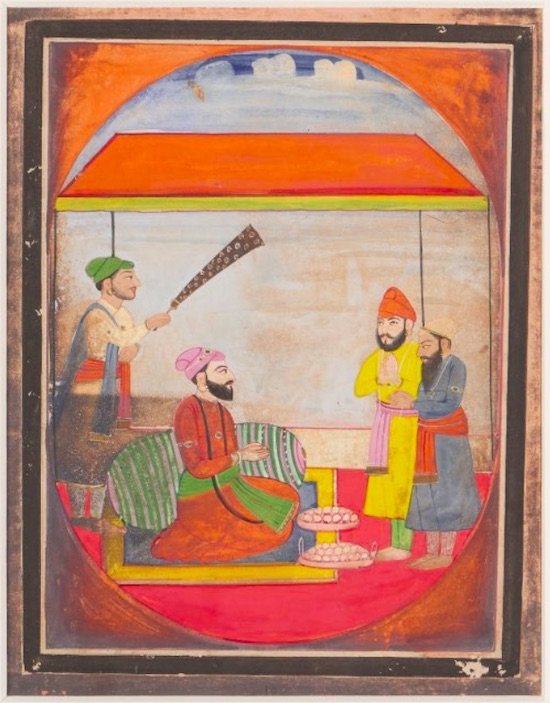
A 19th-century painting depicting Guru Tegh Bahadur

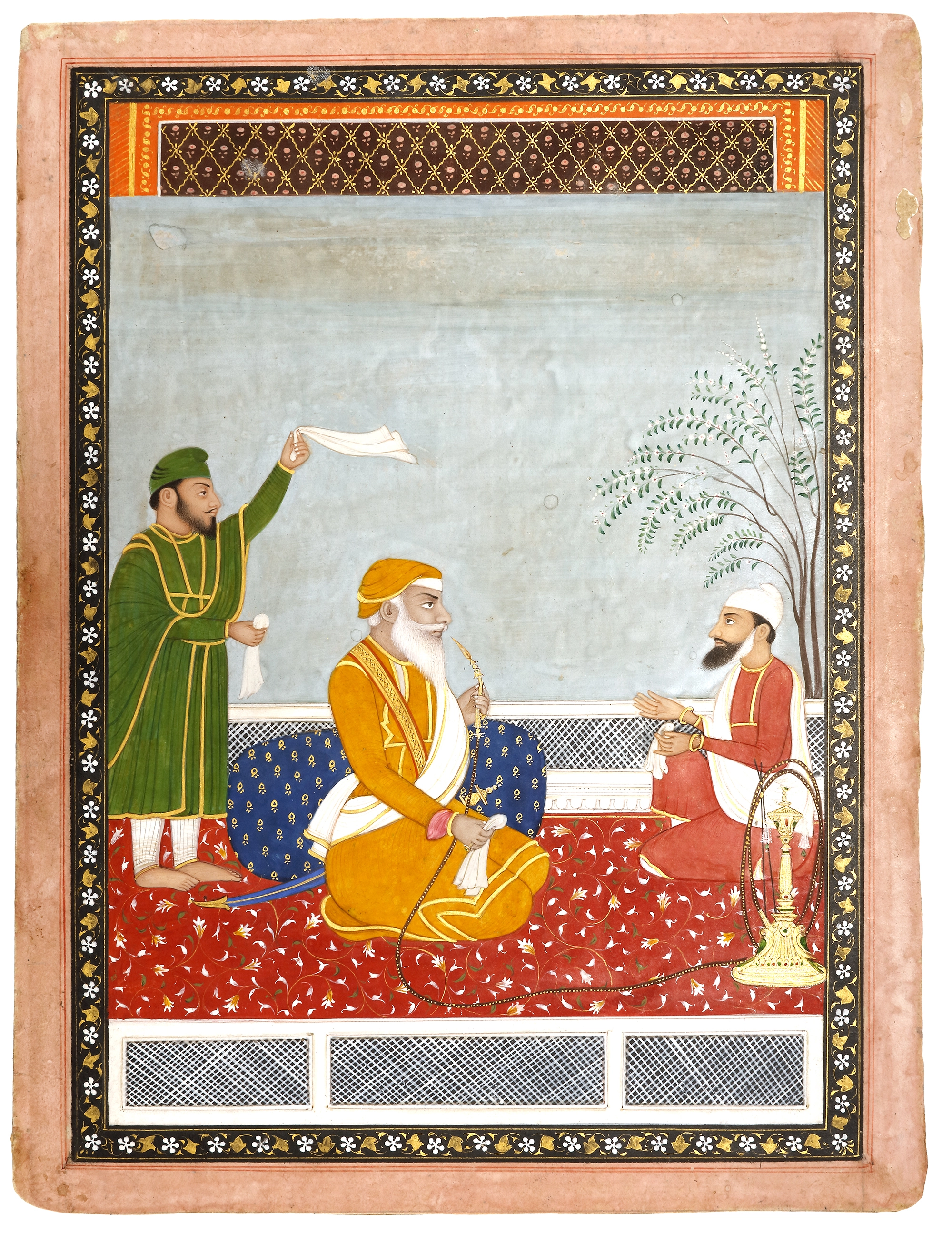
A portrait of Diwan Mokham Chand on a terrace, circa 1840

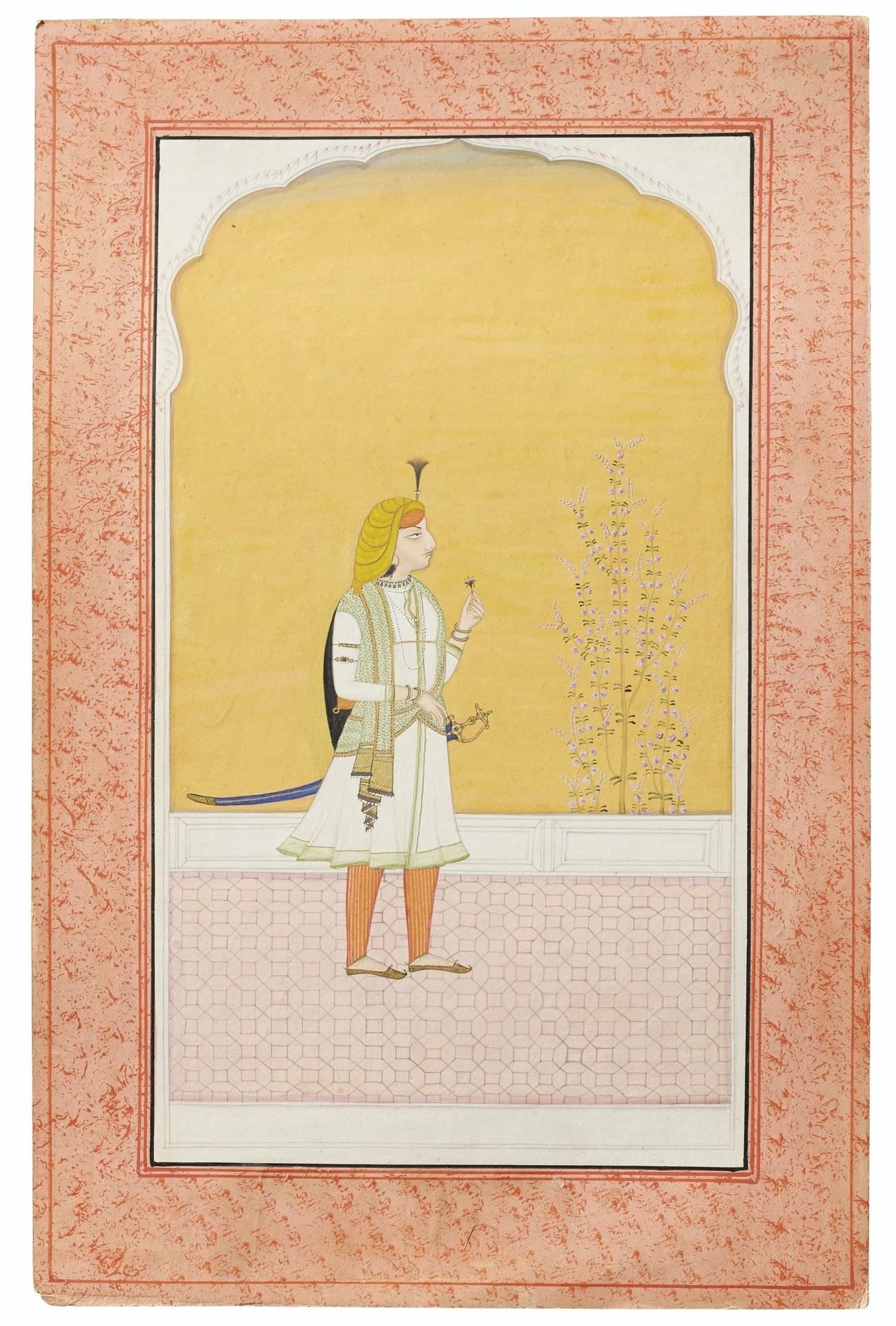
A portrait of Raja Hira Singh - 19th century
