= Kehar Singh (artist) =

Sikh artist (1820–1882)

Baba Kehar Singh Musawar
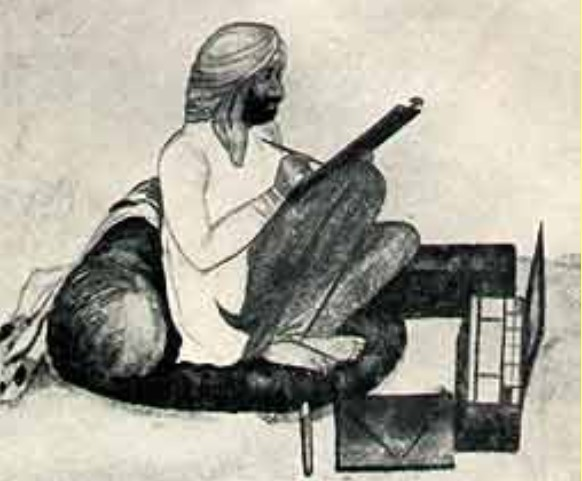
- Self-portrait
- Born: 1820
- Died: 1882 (aged 61–62)
- Style: Sikh School

Kehar Singh (1820–1882) was a Sikh artist who was employed as a court painter by the Sikh states of Lahore and Kapurthala. (Note: His personal name is alternatively spelt as 'Kher' or 'Keher'.) Baba Kehar Singh Musawar was a prominent artist of the Sikh Naqqashi school of art and helped innovate it. The art of frescoes was introduced by the artist Bhai Kehar Singh Musawar under the patronage of Maharaja Ranjit Singh during the era of the Sikh Empire. He was one of the most important of the court painters of Ranjit Singh. Kehar Singh and his family were honoured as Fakhr-e-Qoum ("pride of the nation").

== Family and work ==
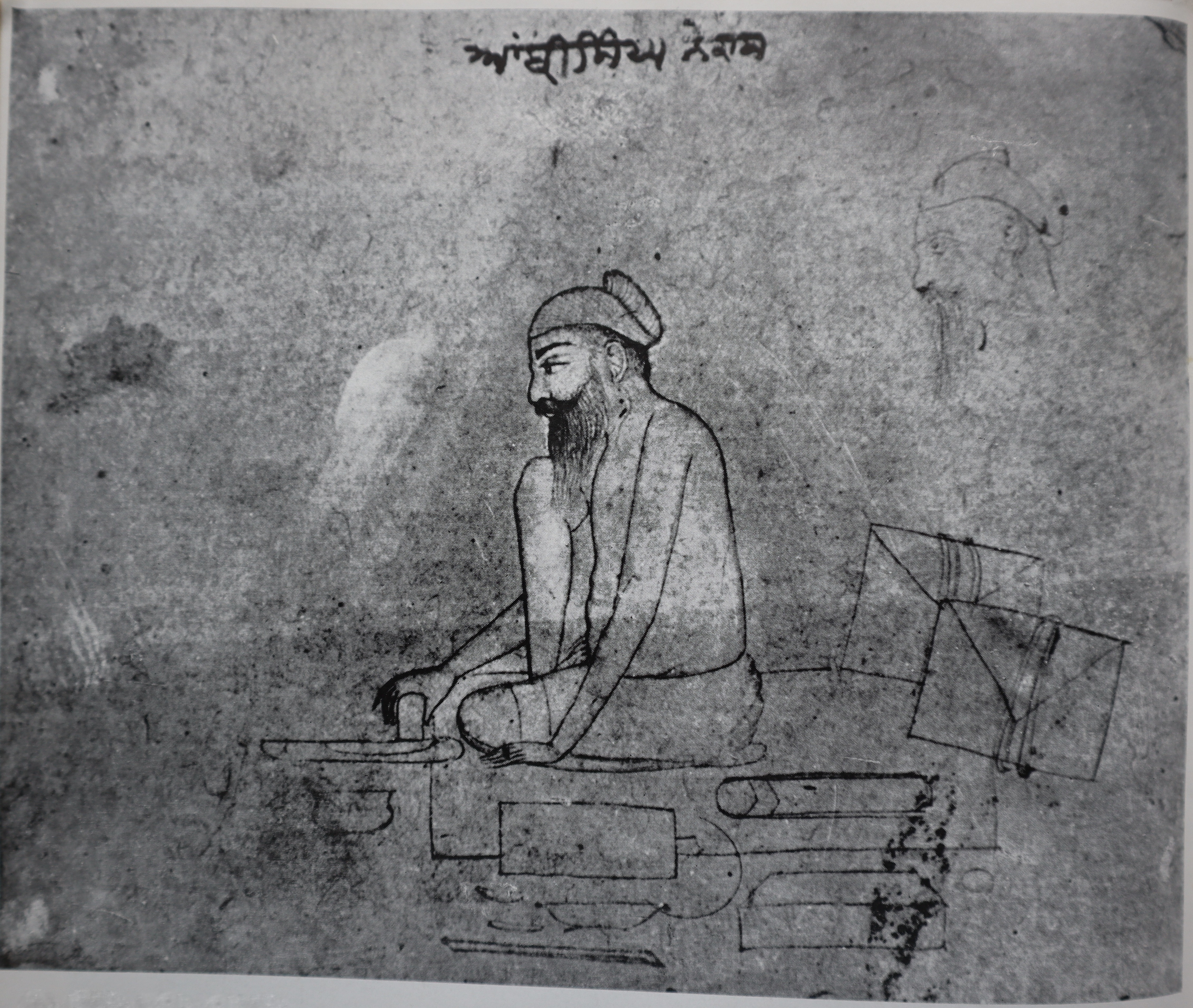
Ambir Singh Naqqash, the father of Kehar Singh, circa 19th century

Kehar Singh was of Ramgarhia origin, specifically belonging to the carpenter (Tarkhan) caste. His family had a background in art. Some of the members of his family worked alongside members of the famous Chughtai family of Lahore, but never at the cost of each-other. Kehar and his family resided at Kucha Tarkhana, Gali Naqqashan, in Amritsar. They would travel from there to other regions to earn a living working as artists. The themes the family painted were Sikh, covering both religious and secular areas.

According to family genealogy narrated by Hakim Gurcharan Singh, a descendant of Kehar Singh (with the information being cross-checked and verified by the artist Hari Singh of Amritsar), it can be known that Kehar Singh was the son of Bhai Ambir Singh and that Kehar had a brother named Ram Singh (with Ram Singh being the father of Ishar Singh). Kehar Singh had a daughter named Ishri who was married to Rood Singh, another naqqashi artist.

According to a tale narrated by K. C. Aryan, Kehar Singh found employment as a court painter of Ranjit Singh after he painted a dead sparrow and convinced a sweeper of the Lahore court to place it on the throne of Ranjit Singh. The feat worked and Kehar Singh was hired as a court painter.

Kehar Singh was responsible for decorating the interiors of Ranjit Singh's Lahori palace with frescoes. After Ranjit Singh witnessed the fine artwork of Kehar Singh, he decided to commission him for beautifying the Golden Temple shrine in Amritsar to embellish it with mural work (such as the domes, walls, and roofs). Kehar Singh also worked at decorating the Akal Takht complex. He also worked on adornment work. Types of structures in Amritsar and Lahore that were decorated by Kehar Singh include havelis and temples (both gurdwaras and mandirs), with him also being active in neighbouring areas of Amritsar and Lahore. Him and his family specialized in mussawir (painters of miniatures). Kehar Singh is credited with establishing a school of naqqashes in Punjab.

The Naqqash artists often were linked to each-other by family bonds, an example being the household of Kehar Singh. Kehar Singh had two nephews named Bishan Singh and Kishan Singh, whom were accomplished artists in their own right. Most of the prominent Sikh artists of 19th and early 20th century Punjab could be traced back to the lineage of Kehar Singh, whether through blood or mentorship. His lineage specialized in murals and other forms of pictorial artwork.

== Style ==
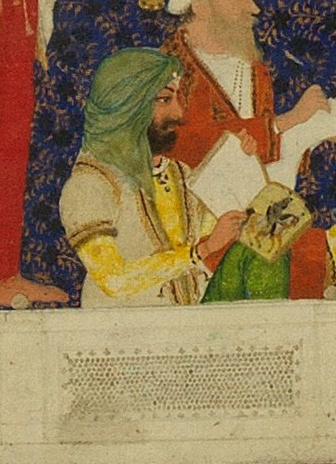
Self-portrait of Kehar Singh painting an equestrian painting of Maharaja Sher Singh of the Sikh Empire, detail from 'Darbar Maharaja Sher Singh' by Kehar Singh, ca.1842–46.

Kehar Singh is distinguishable from other contemporary painters as he painted common-folk going about their daily-lives and occupations, even recording the names of the persons he portrayed, where-as other contemporary painters focused on portraying courtly settings and noble individuals. He was influenced by European-styles of watercolour, print, photography, and oil painting. Kehar Singh was influenced by the breakdown of central Sikh authority and the introduction of European manners of artwork and photography, leading to the rise of the Company School. B. N. Goswamy distinguishes the works of Kehar Singh from that of the Bazaar School, as they are "more serious, more aware of quality". Attention to detail can be seen in the facial expressions of the figures portrayed in his paintings. To suit English tastes, Kehar Singh began producing artwork using translucent wash, which is unalike the opaque watercolor used in traditional Indian painting. As to Kehar Singh's work, there was European influence on the effects of light and shade in his art pieces. He is believed to have been the first to introduce avian (bird) designs to the Sikh frescoes. There are examples of Kehar Singh portraying himself in his paintings, as a form of self-portraiture. One self-portrait depicts him seated on a mat whilst leaned against a bolster, with a board on his lap and a large, open wooden-box with his painting materials before him. Many real-life locations are depicted in his extant paintings, such as the Naulakha Pavilion of the Lahore Fort. When portraying a particular societal grouping, such as an occupation or caste, Kehar Singh portrayed actual living, breathing individuals rather than creating generalized depictions.

== Collection ==
Artwork that was produced by the familial atelier and lineage of Kehar Singh can be found in the collections of the Lahore Museum (Pakistan), Government Museum and Art Gallery (Chandigarh), Victoria and Albert Museum (London), and the Central Sikh Museum (Amritsar, pre-1984). A series of work attributed to Kehar Singh dating to circa 1875 are kept in the collection of the Government Museum and Art Gallery in Chandigarh.

== Gallery ==
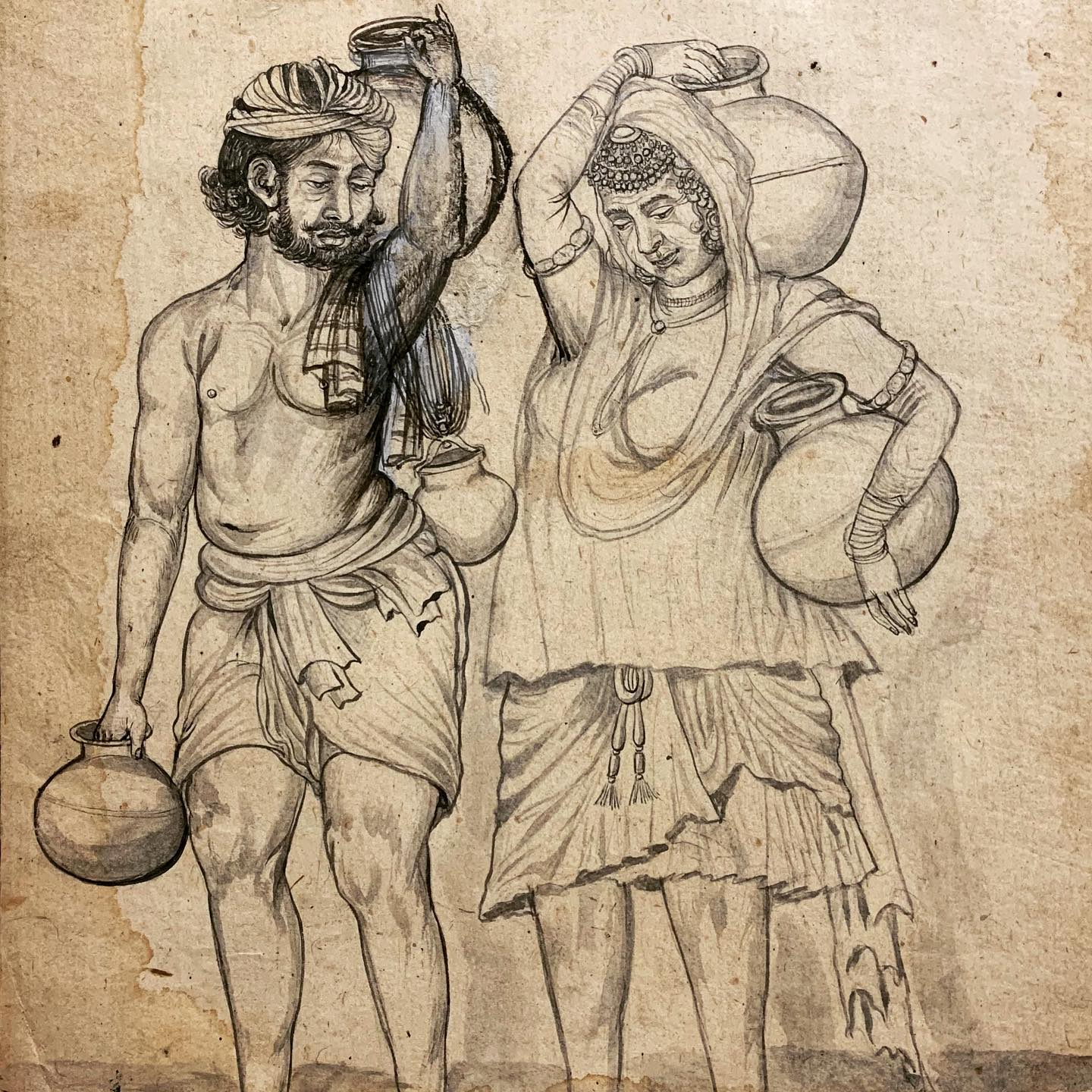
'A Couple Carrying Water Pitchers', by Kehar Singh, Punjab, circa 19th century

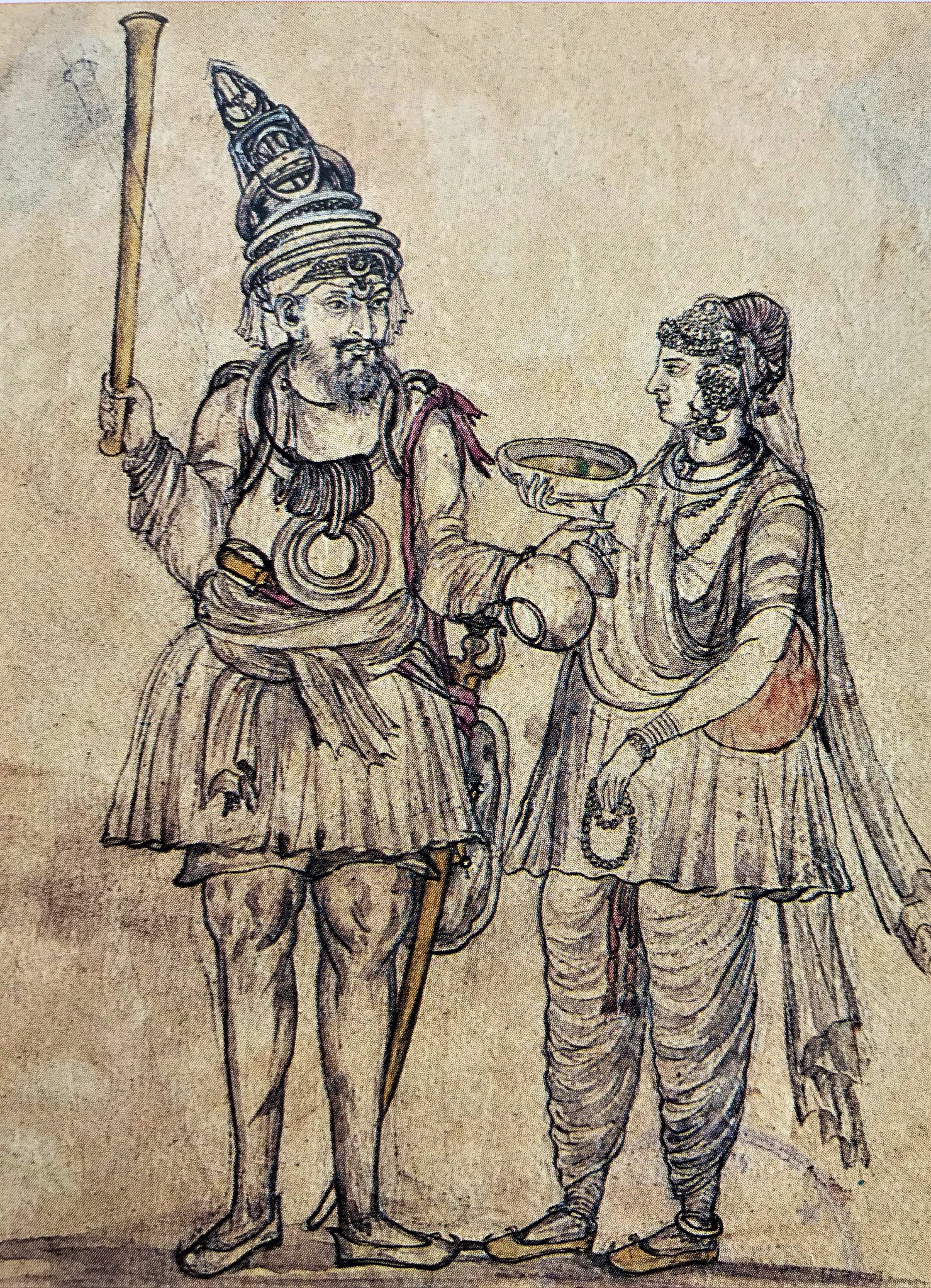
Nihang and Nihangni, by Kehar Singh

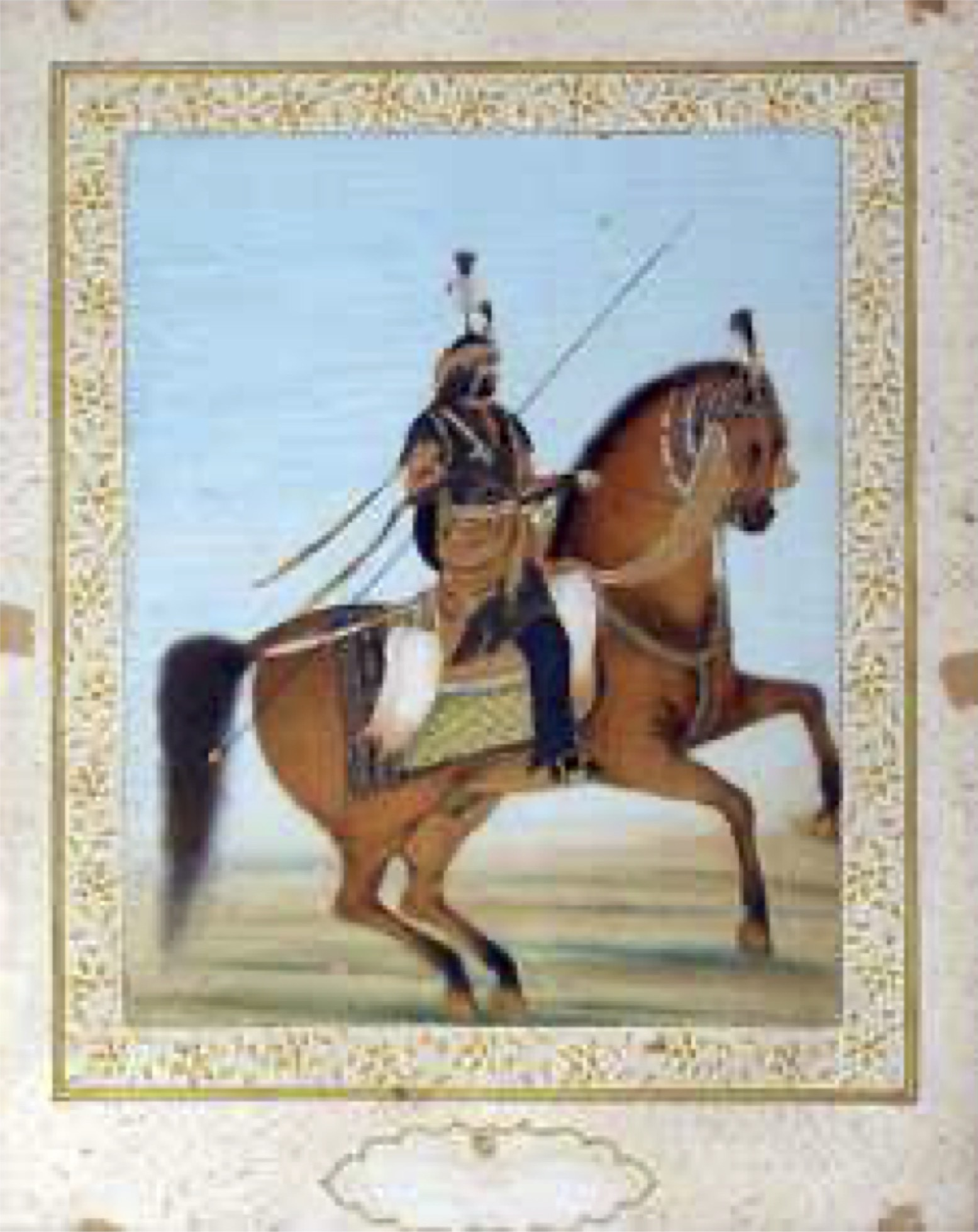
'Maharaja Sher Singh on Horseback' by Keher Singh, ca.1842–46

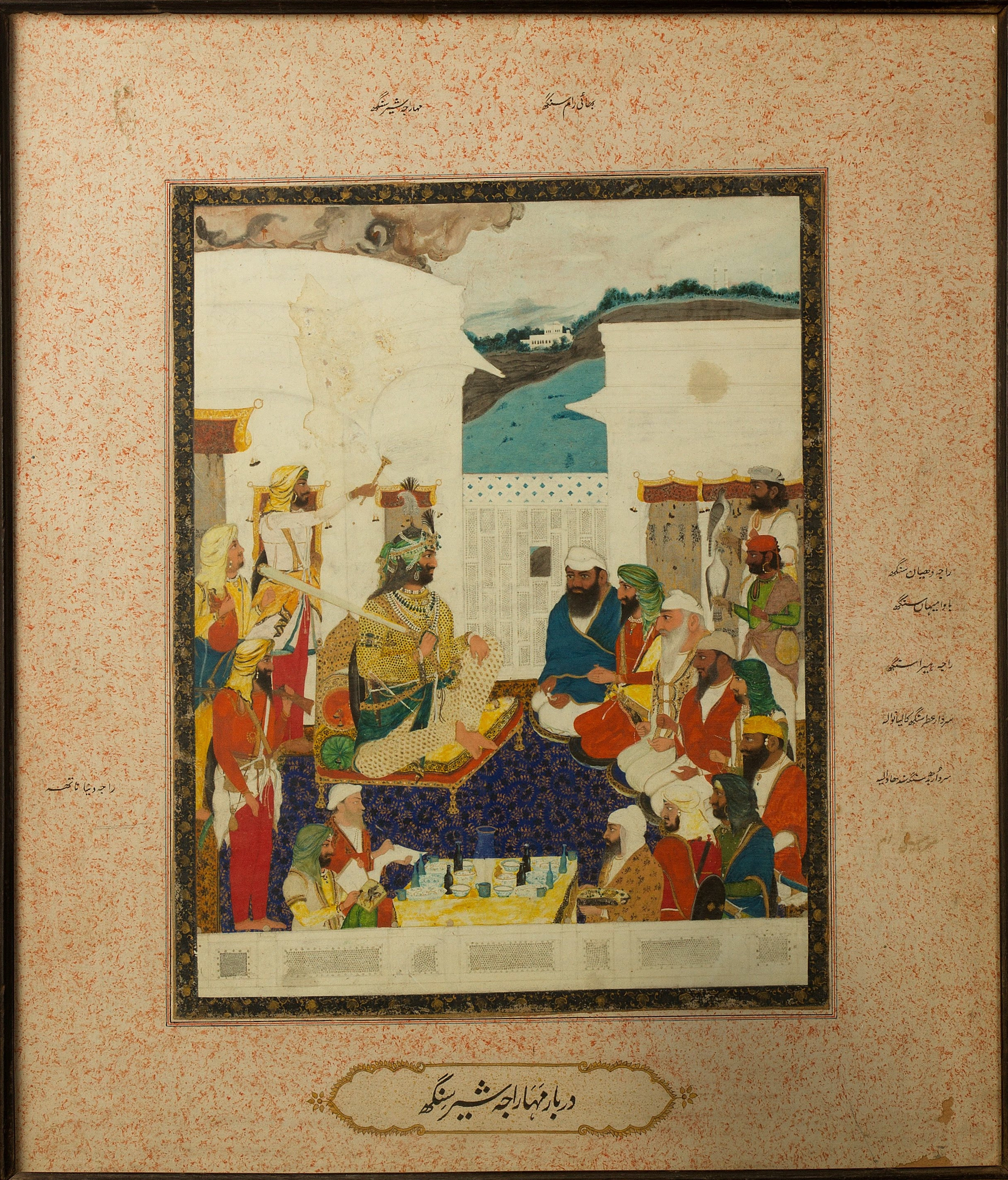
Maharaja Sher Singh & Courtiers in Naulakha Pavilion, Lahore Fort with river Ravi flowing, by Kehar Singh. A self-portrait of the artist at-work can be seen at the bottom of the frame.

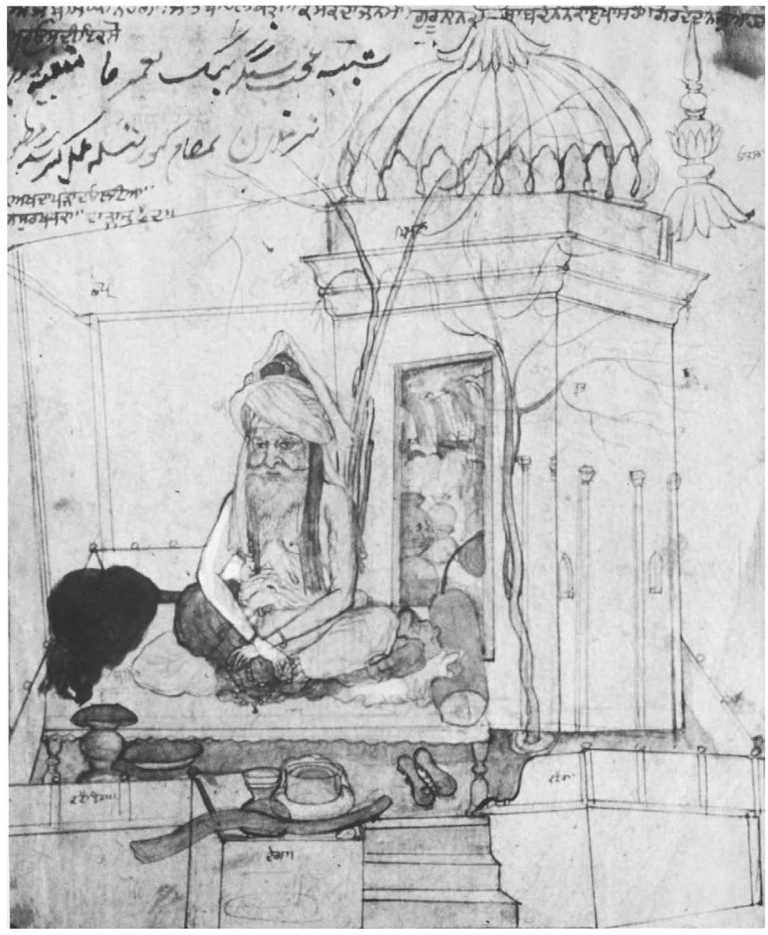
Painting of the Sikh saint Ajab Singh Nihang by Kehar Singh, ca.1850–75

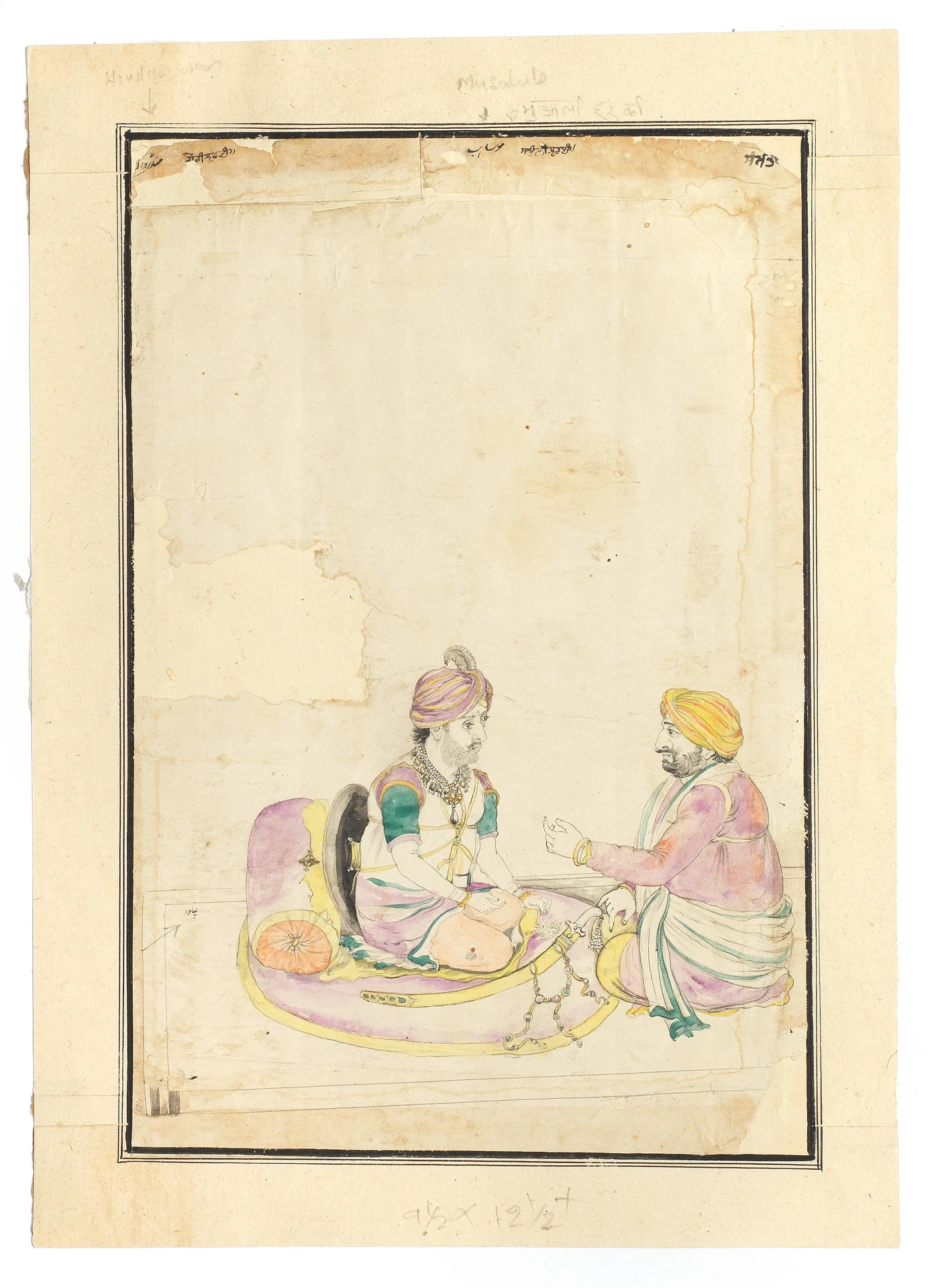
Watercolour sketch of two noblemen of the Punjab seated in discussion, attributed to the artist Kehar Singh, circa 1875

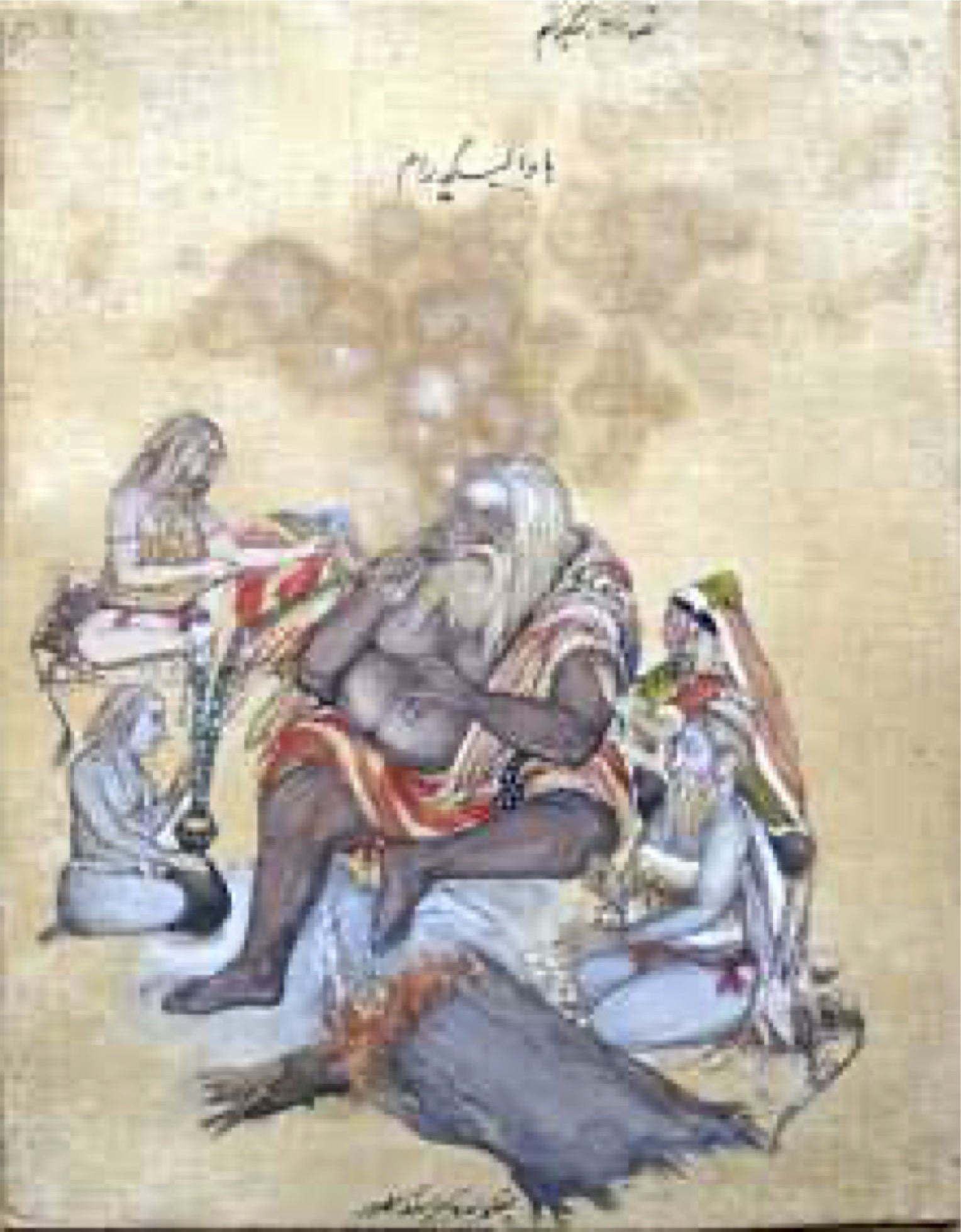
'Bawa Lekh Ram' by Keher Singh, ca.1830–40

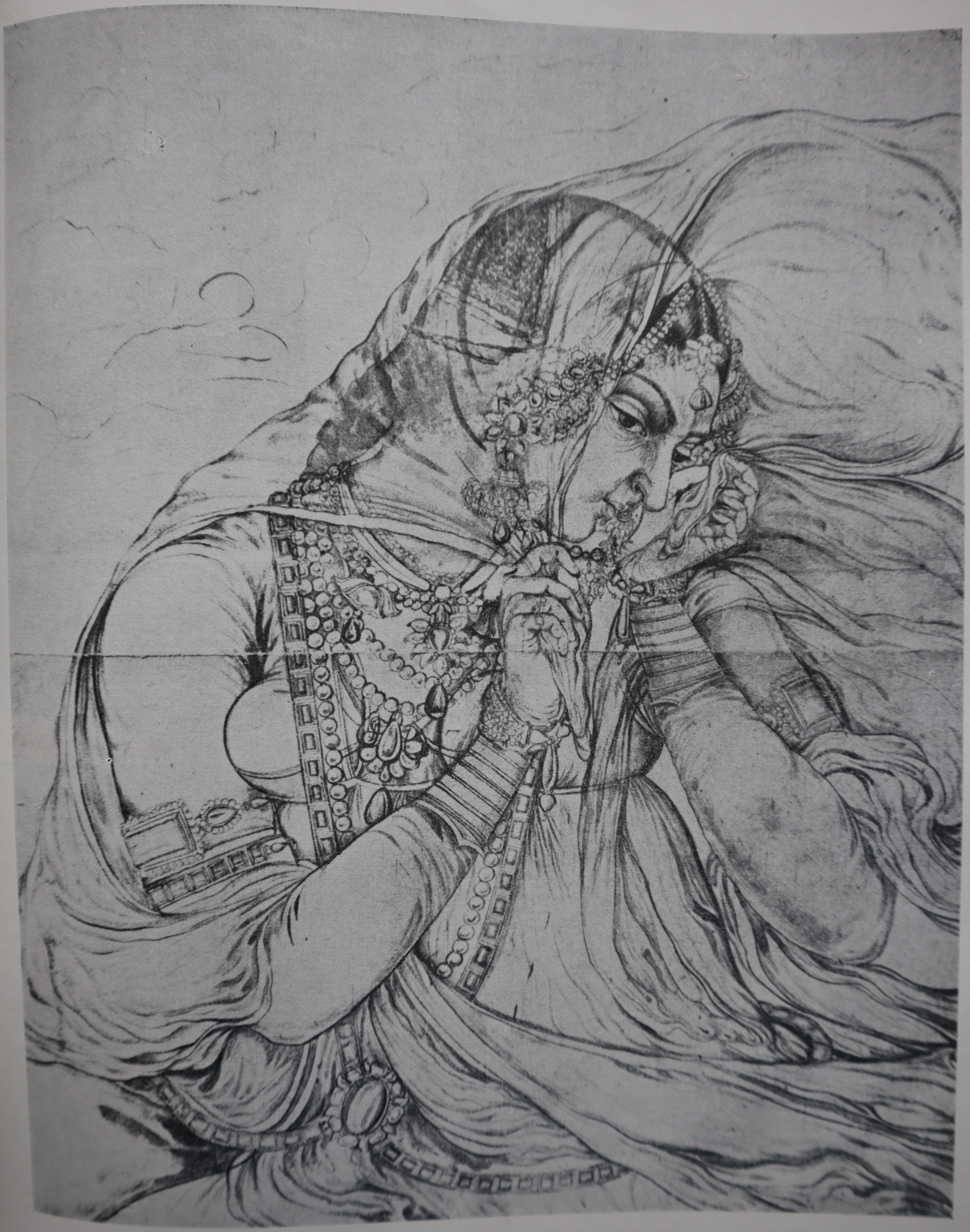
A Sketch of Sardarni Sada Kaur, by Kehar Singh

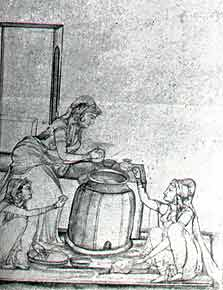
Women cooking in tandoor, by Kehar Singh
