= Amit Dutt (painter) =

Indian painter

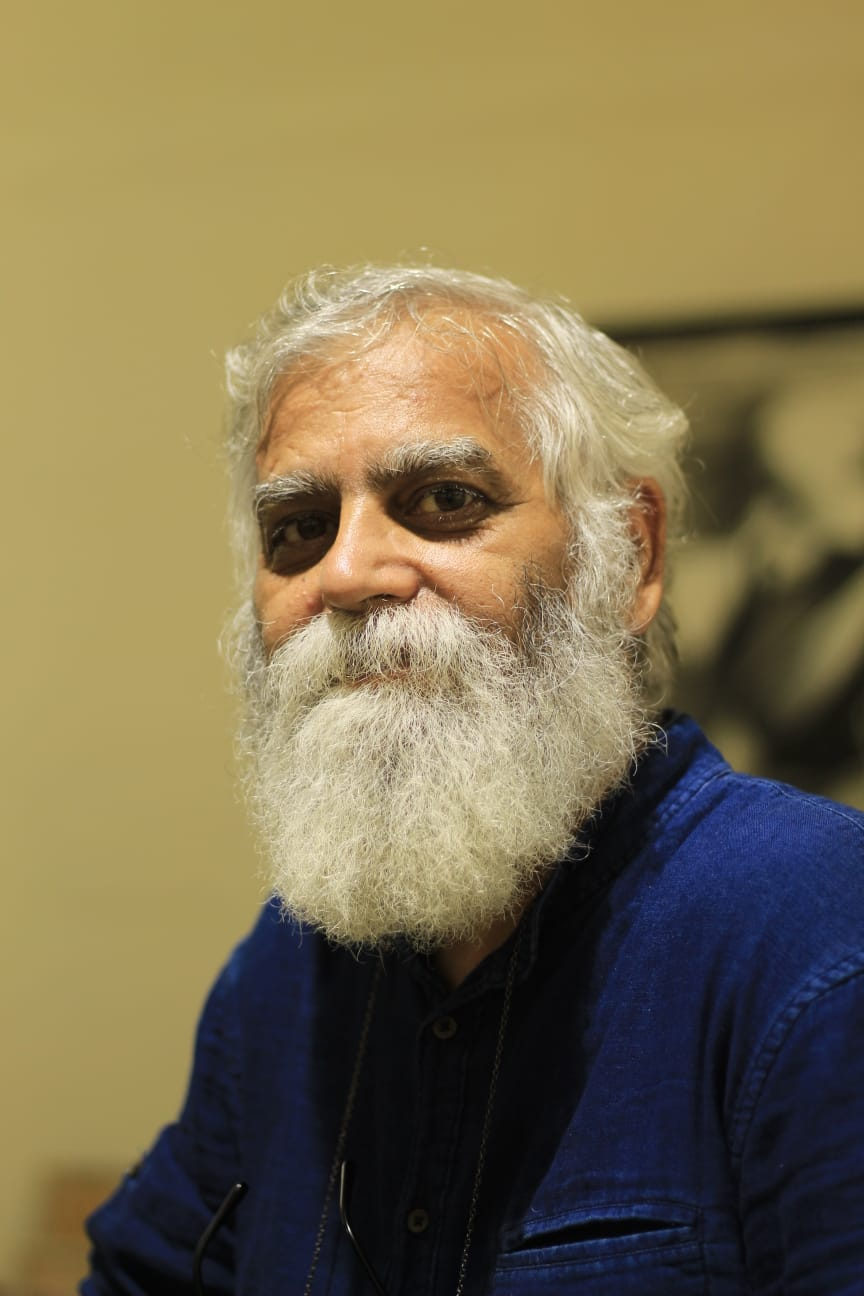
- Education: Shilpa Bharti Institute of Fine Arts and Crafts
- Occupation: Painter
- Known for: Sutra, Mukhaute, Dayre, Serenity, Tranquility, Inner Journey
- Awards: Lalit Kala Akademi; Sahitya Kala Parishad
- Website: artsutra.net

Amit Dutt is an Indian painter from New Delhi, his paintings depict diverse facets of human nature and the social interdependence of man through multiple ties. He has done several national and international exhibitions in both solo and group format. His paintings are in collection of many art collectors in Indian and abroad, including Rashtrapati Niwas Shimla and National Gallery of Modern Art.

He has received many awards for his notable work including Lalit Kala Akademi Award, the highest award honoured by the Government of India for visual arts, and Sahitya Kala Academy Award.

== Career ==
Amit completed 5 years Diploma in Fine Arts from Shilpa Bharti Institute of Fine Art, New Delhi. A course in carpet designing led him to art school. He is a contemporary artist whose most of the works are in acrylic and mixed medium on canvas and paper in the modern art category.

He has participated in many solo and group shows inside and outside the country. His recent international exhibition Identity was organized by Arth International and KL City Art gallery, Kuala Lumpur, Malaysia in 2020.

Amit has also conceptualized an app with the name ArtSutra that helps the viewer to see the artwork on their phone including the crafting of their favorite artwork. The app is available both on android and iOS operating systems.

== Solo exhibitions (selected) ==
- 2017: ‘Lakeeren’ at Lalit Kala Akademi, Rabindra Bhawan, New Delhi
- 2016: ‘Serenity’ at Art Sutra, New Delhi
- 2014: ‘Art Sutra’ at Lalit Kala Akademi, Rabindra Bhawan, New Delhi
- 2013: ‘Art Sutra’ at Gallery Pioneer, New Delhi
- 2012: ‘Tranquility’ at Gallery Pioneer, New Delhi

== International exhibitions (selected) ==
- 2020: ‘Identity’ organised by Arth International and KL City Art Gallery, Kuala Lumpur, Malaysia (Virtual mode)
- 2017: ‘Indian Contemporaries’ in Nizhny Novgorod, Russia

== Awards and honours ==
2017: National Academy Award in the 59th National Exhibition of Art

2005:

- Bombay Art Society All India Award
- AIFACS All India Award
- All India Award by Indian Academy of Fine Arts, Amritsar

2004: Camel All India Art Teachers' Award

1998: Scholarship by ‘Times Eye Research Foundation’

1991: Sahitya Kala Parishad Award in 7th Yuva Mahotsav (Youth Festival)

== Books ==
- Dutt, Amit (1 January 2016). Khayalon Ke Parinde. India: SHILALEKH. p. 112. ISBN 978-8173293887.
