= Poornima Dayal =

Indian painter

- Born: New Delhi
- Education: University of Delhi
- Occupation: Painter
- Website: www.poornimadayal.com

Poornima Dayal (born in New Delhi) is an Indian painter, best known for her abstract art. Her works have been exhibited at the Jehangir Art Gallery in Mumbai, at the Vienna Biennale and a host of international art exhibitions in America, Europe and Asia. A graduate of the University of Delhi, she is the founder of the art forum Art Grooves.
