= Sushila Yawalkar =

Indian painter, sculptor and dancer

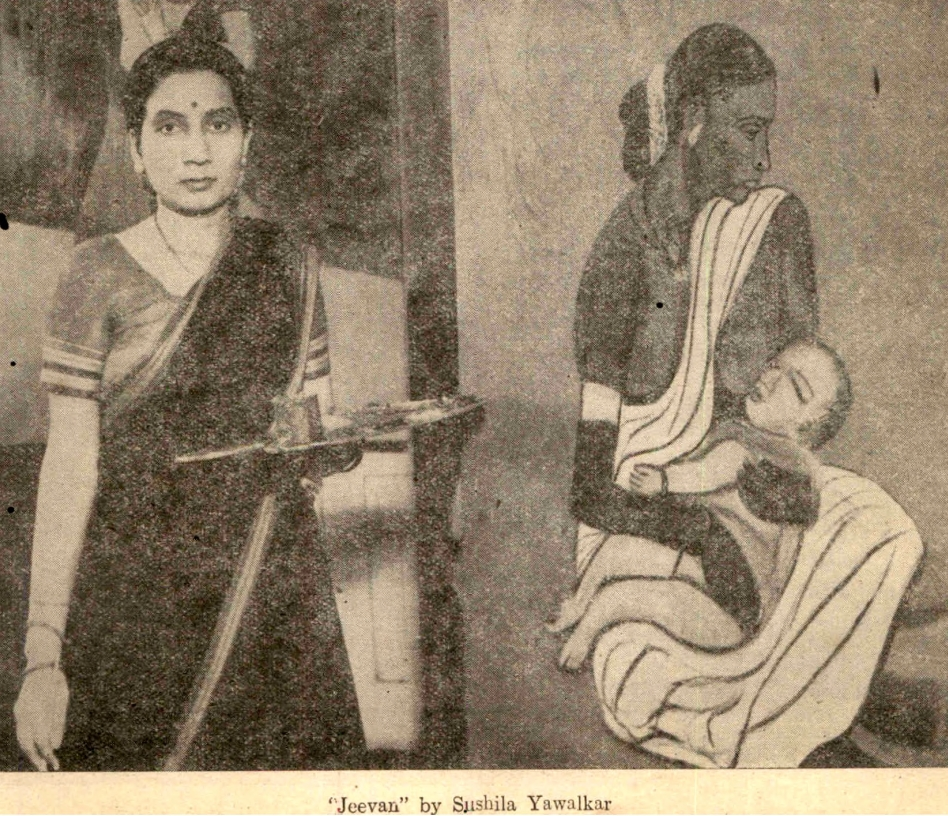
- Yawalkar next to one of her paintings
- Known for: painting, sculpting and dancing
- Spouse: Nagesh Yawalkar

Sushila Yawalkar was an Indian painter, sculptor and dancer.

== Biography ==
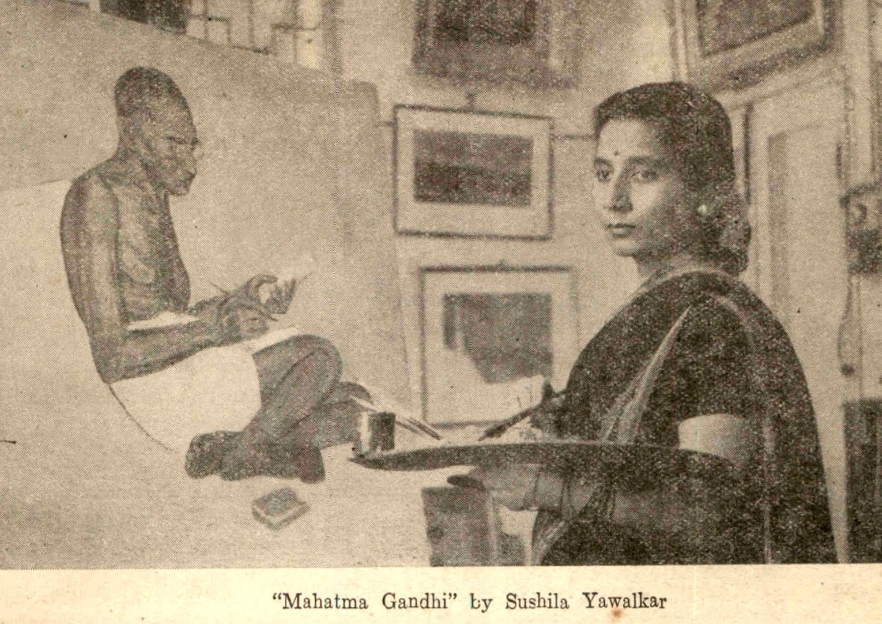
Yawalkar' painting of Mahatma Gandhi in 1948

Yawalker was from Goa in Western India and was married to artist Nagesh Yawalkar.

In 1947, Yawalker was described as an artist with "a lively unspoilt imagination." Her paintings and sculptures were exhibited in a studio exhibition in 1949, then in New Delhi in 1950. She also exhibited her sculptures and paintings at the All Indian Fine Arts and Crafts Society (AIFACS).
