= Vasudeo Kamath =

Indian artist (born 1956)

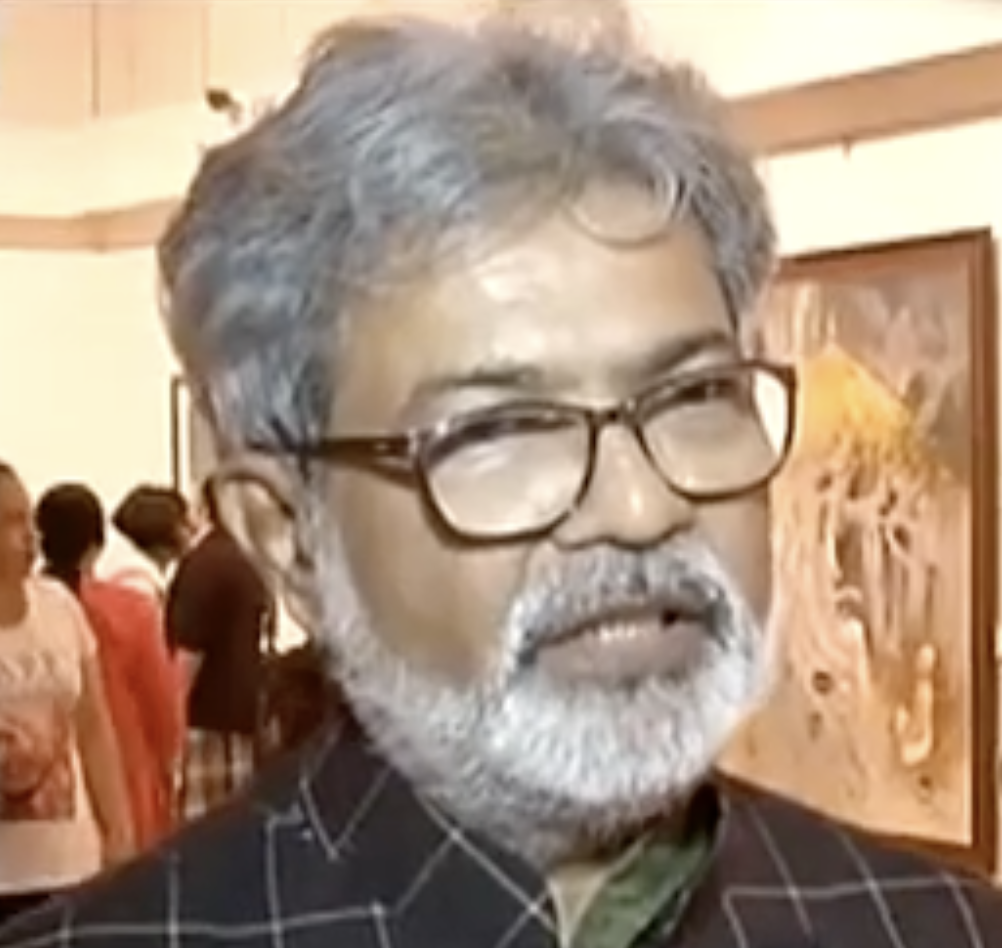
- Kamath in 2018
- Born: 1956 (age 69–70); Karkala, Udupi district, Karnataka
- Occupations: Painter and portrait artist
- Awards: Padma Shri (2025)

Vasudeo Kamath (born 1956) is an Indian painter and portrait artist known for his realistic style and contributions to contemporary Indian art. In 2025, he was awarded the Padma Shri, India's fourth-highest civilian award, by the Government of India for his significant contributions to the field of art.

== Early life and education ==
Kamath was born in 1956 in Karkala, a town in the Udupi district of Karnataka. He pursued his formal education in fine arts at the Sir J. J. School of Art in Mumbai, where he earned his G.D. Art diploma in 1977. During his formative years, he was deeply influenced by the everyday life and spiritual atmosphere of his surroundings, which later became a recurring theme in his work.

== Career and style ==
Kamath is primarily recognized for his mastery of realism. His body of work spans various genres, including portraiture, landscapes, and mythological themes. He often works with oil and watercolors, focusing on the play of light and shadow to create a sense of depth and life in his subjects.

He has been a vocal advocate for traditional realistic art, conducting numerous workshops and demonstrations to make art more accessible to the public. He believes in the importance of foundational skills and "taking art to the masses" rather than keeping it restricted to elite circles.

== Notable works ==
- Ayodhya Ram Temple: Kamath was commissioned to create the artwork for the interior hall of the Ayodhya Ram Temple. His work there involves large-scale depictions of various episodes from the Valmiki Ramayana.
- Ram Lalla Idol: He was one of the renowned artists selected to prepare a model/sketch for the Ram Lalla idol for the Ayodhya temple.
- Portraiture: As a distinguished portrait artist, Kamath has painted several prominent figures, including a portrait of Prime Minister Narendra Modi and Indian actor Amitabh Bachchan.

== Awards and recognition ==
- Padma Shri (2025) — Awarded for his distinguished service in the field of Art.
- He has received various other accolades throughout his career for his contribution to realistic painting and his efforts in art education.
