= Sheesh Ram =

Indian ex-soldier and painter

Sheesh Ram (born 10 October 1949) is an ex-soldier of the Indian Army and a painter specialising in depicting themes like national integration, women empowerment, Indian warfare, terrorist attacks in India and the world. After 40 years of service in the Indian Army he retired in the year 2007. While he was in service and also after retirement he has been creating paintings on various themes like battle scenes, patriotism and soldiers' sacrifices. Many of his paintings have been installed in the Art Gallery of the Army. He had also conducted an exhibition of his paintings in Dubai. He has also designed many medals for the Army. Medals designed by him are still used for conferring Army, Air Force, Navy and Paramilitary honours. In the year 2022, Govt of India honoured Sheesh Ram by conferring the Padma Shri award for his contributions to art.

== Life and work ==
Sheesh Ram was born on 10 October 1949 in Begambagh in Meerut in Uttar Pradesh. His father was an employee of Meerut College. He used to watch NCC activities in the college along with his father. He completed matriculation from Sitabharti School. He then also took art training courses at Sevaram Art School and Chaman School of Art. After matriculation Sheesh Ram joined the Indian Army. All his subsequent education happened while he was in the Army. He retired from Army in 2007 as a Technical Supervisor in the Corps of EME.

== Some notable works ==
The following are some of the notable works of Sheesh Ram. A more complete list is available in the facebook page of Sheesh Ram.

- Oil painting depicting the assassination of Mahatma Gandhi in 1948
- Saluting the soldiers who were martyred while fighting the terrorists at the Taj Hotel, Mumbai in 2008
- The attack on former Prime Minister Indira Gandhi by her own bodyguard in 1984
- The attack on the Indian Parliament House in 2001
- Prime Minister Narendra Modi's visit to Dubai
- Oil painting depicting the Bangladesh liberation war in 1971
- Oil painting depicting the Kargil War in 1999
- Several paintings depicting various battle scenes during different India-Pakistan wars
- Oil painting depicting the tragedy of Kalpana Chawla in 2003

== Padma Shri award ==
- In the year 2022, Govt of India conferred the Padma Shri award, the third highest award in the Padma series of awards, on Sheesh Ram for his distinguished service in the field of art. The award is in recognition of his service as "Retired soldier and 1971 war veteran turned painter from Meerut specialising in depicting episodes of valour during war".

== See also ==
- Padma Shri Award recipients in the year 2022
