= Rajesh Pullarwar =

Indian artist, painter, and printmaker (born 1974)

Rajesh Pullarwar (born 13 December 1974, in Nagpur) is an Indian artist, painter, and printmaker. A graduate of the Sir J. J. School of Art, his works have been displayed at the Nehru Centre in Mumbai, The Pierre in New York City and at the Taj Mahal Palace Hotel in Colaba. He was awarded the Most Promising Artist of the Future Award by the National Gallery of Modern Art, Mumbai in 2005. He is the founder of the International Print Exchange Program.

== Bibliography ==
- Pullarwar, Rajesh (2007). Rajesh Pullarwar. Chatterjee and Lal.
