= Bishan Singh (artist) =

Sikh artist (1836–c.1900)

Baba Bishan Singh
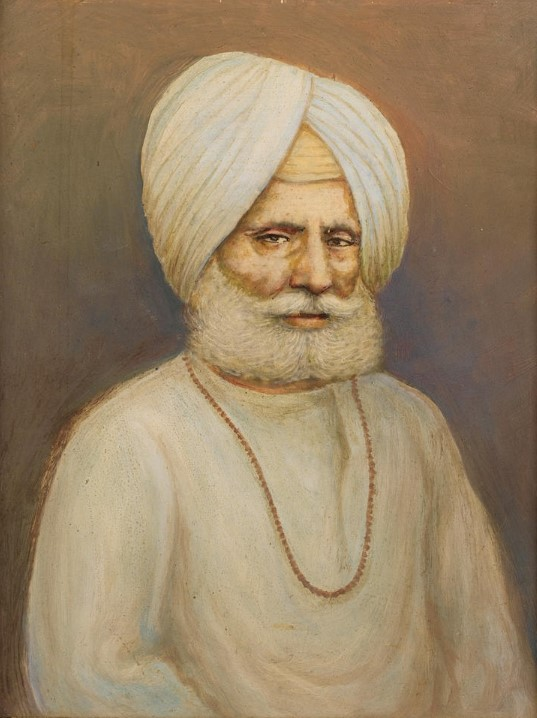
- Self-portrait
- Born: 1836
- Died: circa 1900
- Known for: Painting
- Notable work: The Court of Ranjit Singh (ca.1864)
- Style: Sikh School
- Children: Nihal Singh; Jawahar Singh

Bishan Singh (1836 – ca.1900), also known as Baba Bishan Singh, was a Sikh painter whom achieved high-acclaim during his life. Much of his surviving works depicts scenes from the Sikh Empire and prominent figures of the era. His paintings have sold for large sums at auction.

== Biography ==
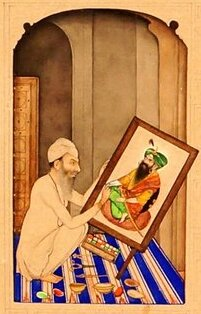
Self-portrait of Bishan Singh, detail from a painting of Sikh Empire-era Amritsar from the 19th century

Bishan Singh was born in 1836 into a Ramgarhia family of artists that flourished in the 19th century who operated in Lahore and Amritsar. He had a brother, whom also was an artist, named Kishan Singh. His family operated in Lahore and Amritsar and were responsible for maintaining murals and motifs decorating the edifices of the Golden Temple complex in Amritsar. It is likely Bishan Singh learnt his trade through this traditional, familial upbringing amongst artists. Bhai Bishan Singh was both the pupil and nephew of Kehar Singh. Many of Bishan Singh's paintings feature scenery and personalities from the period of the Sikh Empire, such as Maharaja Ranjit Singh. His paintings are remarkable for this close attention to detail and accuracy, such as buildings being portrayed exactly as they had existed in real-life in his era and ensuring to paint an extra digit when depicting Dhian Singh. However, Bishan Singh was a devout Sikh, which may have led him to omit important foreign, European figures from Ranjit Singh's court from his paintings, as he may felt it would impair the work.

In 1866, ten of Bishan Singh's works were displayed at the exhibition of arts and crafts held at Lahore. Baden-Powell and Percy Brown levied the following observations and critiques of Bishan Singh's work after viewing them at the exhibition:

... the perspective of the buildings is incorrect but the figure drawing is admirable. The colour is tasteful and rich and likenesses are good and the expression is varied and truthful.

— Baden Henry Baden-Powell, Handbook of the Manufactures and Arts of the Punjab (Lahore; 1872), pages 354–355

Bishan Singh had two sons who became artists, Nihal Singh and Jawahar Singh. Bishan Singh also was the art teacher of his two sons. Bishan Singh had a nephew named Kapur Singh (son of his brother, Kishan Singh), who became a successful artist in his own right.

== Style ==
Bishan Singh's style included vivid greens, yellows, and blues. Meticulous detail was placed upon the depicted scene, especially regarding figures, botany, and architecture. He often depicted tradespeople living their daily lives. Bishan Singh was influenced by the Company School. Furthermore, he came under the influence of the style of realism that had been introduced by the Europeans. Bishan Singh was skilled in arabesque and was responsible for the commencement of fresh and bright brush strokes. Bishan Singh was talented in depicting courtly durbar scenery. However, his self-portrait differs in-style greatly from his durbar painting, with his self-portrait showing strong European and Western influence, where he uses the standard codes of European portraiture. In his self-portrait, the material and mode he utilized was watercolour on cardboard, with him facing and looking directly at the viewer from the front, with his physical characteristics and facial features portrayed as aged and realistic, which is in-line with the Western method of portraiture.

== Legacy ==
Bishan Singh's surviving works have gone on auction numerous times. One of his paintings of the durbar of Maharaja Ranjit Singh sold at a Christie's London auction for US$580,021 in 2022.

One of his paintings was bought decades ago in North London by a taxi driver, who haggled the price down to £40 ($58). The taxi driver, who did not realize or know the true worth of the painting he possessed for all those years, would sell it decades later for £92,250 (US$133,500) at a Roseberys auction. In an October 2025 auction by Sotheby’s London, the painting Maharaja Ranjit Singh in Procession, Riding on an Elephant Through a Bazaar (ca.1860–70) by Bishan Singh was purchased for £952,000 (US$1.3 million) by an unnamed institution, setting a new record for Sikh artwork.

Much of the surviving works of Bishan Singh are in private collections, such as the Toor and Kapany collections.

== Exhibitions ==
- Punjab Exhibition of Arts and Industry (London; 1864)

== Gallery ==
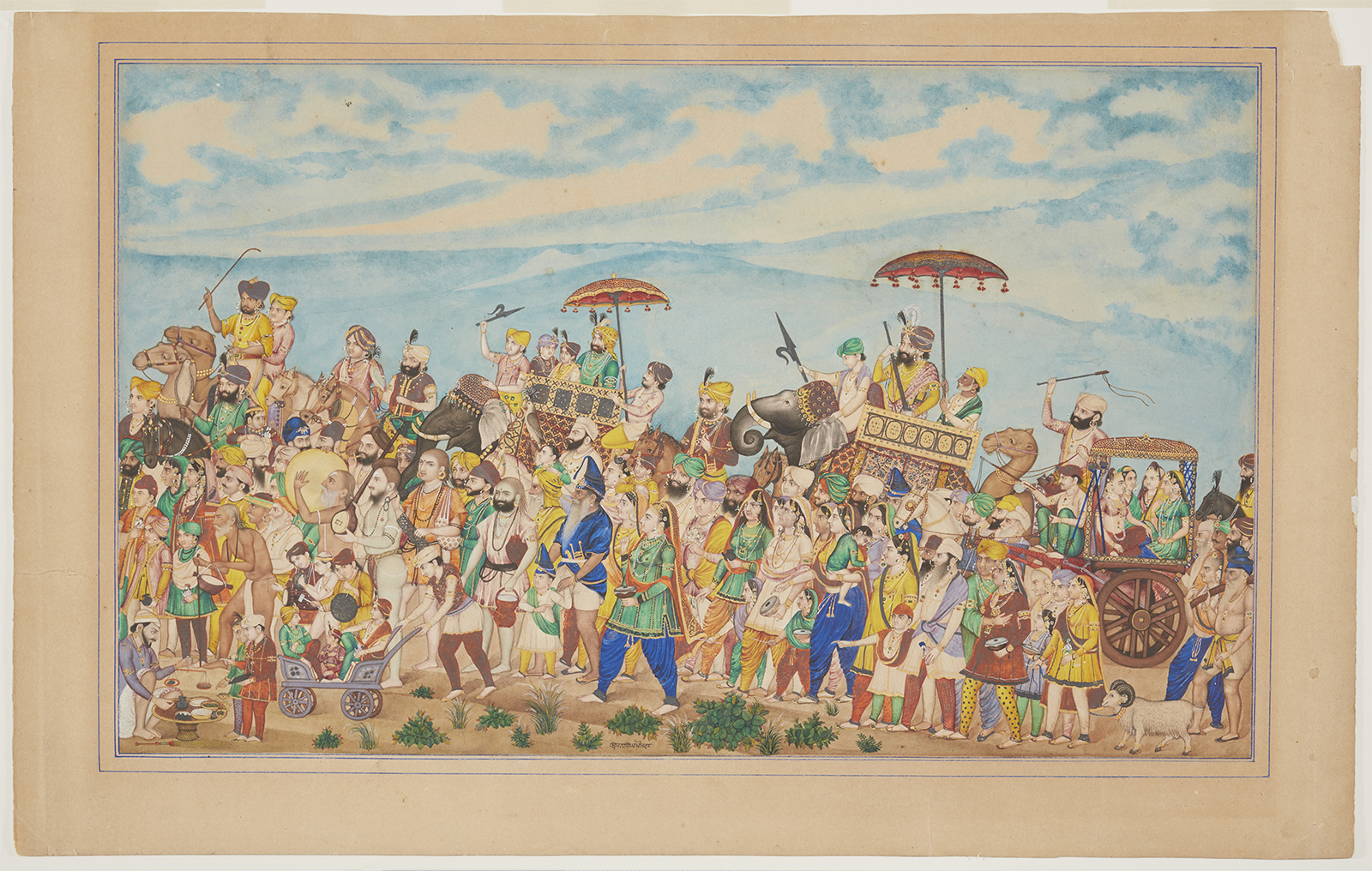
'Royal Procession of Maharaja Sher Singh and His Sons', by Bishan Singh, ca.1870

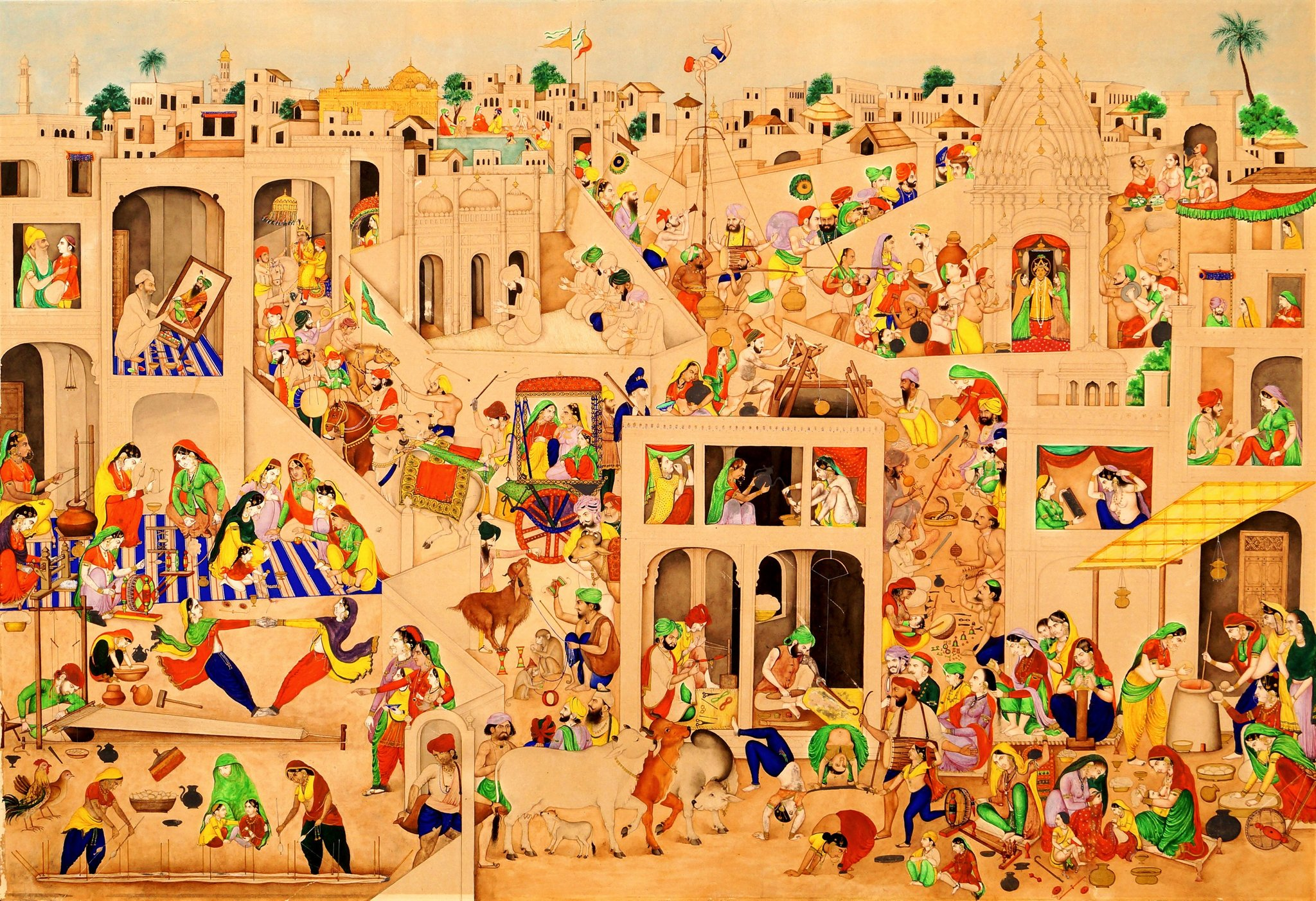
Painting of Sikh Empire-era Amritsar from the 19th century, by Bishan Singh

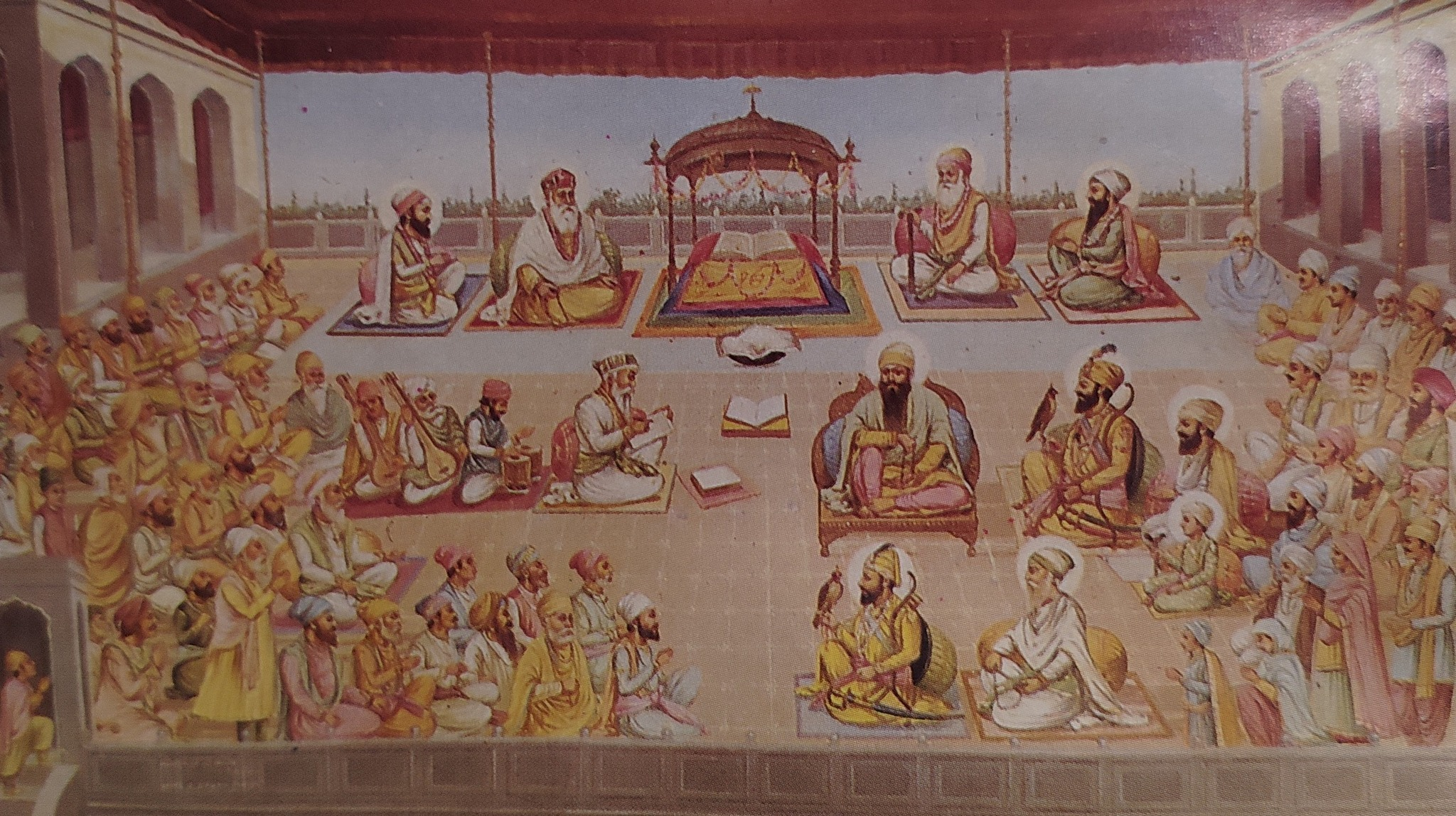
'Guru Prakash', painting of all the Sikh gurus and their followers from Gurdwara Ramsar by Bishan Singh, circa 19th century

Painting of the court of Maharaja Ranjit Singh, by Bishan Singh, ca.1864

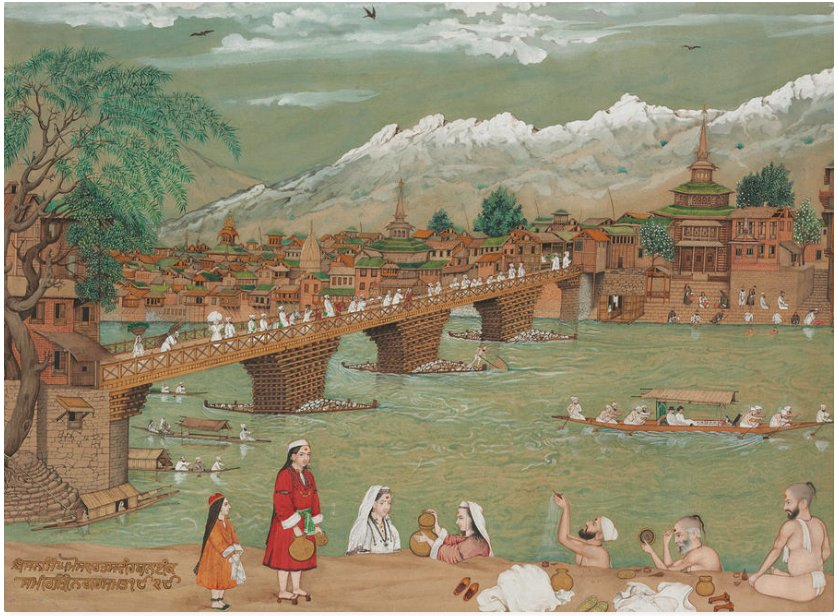
View of Srinagar, by Bishan Singh, 1872

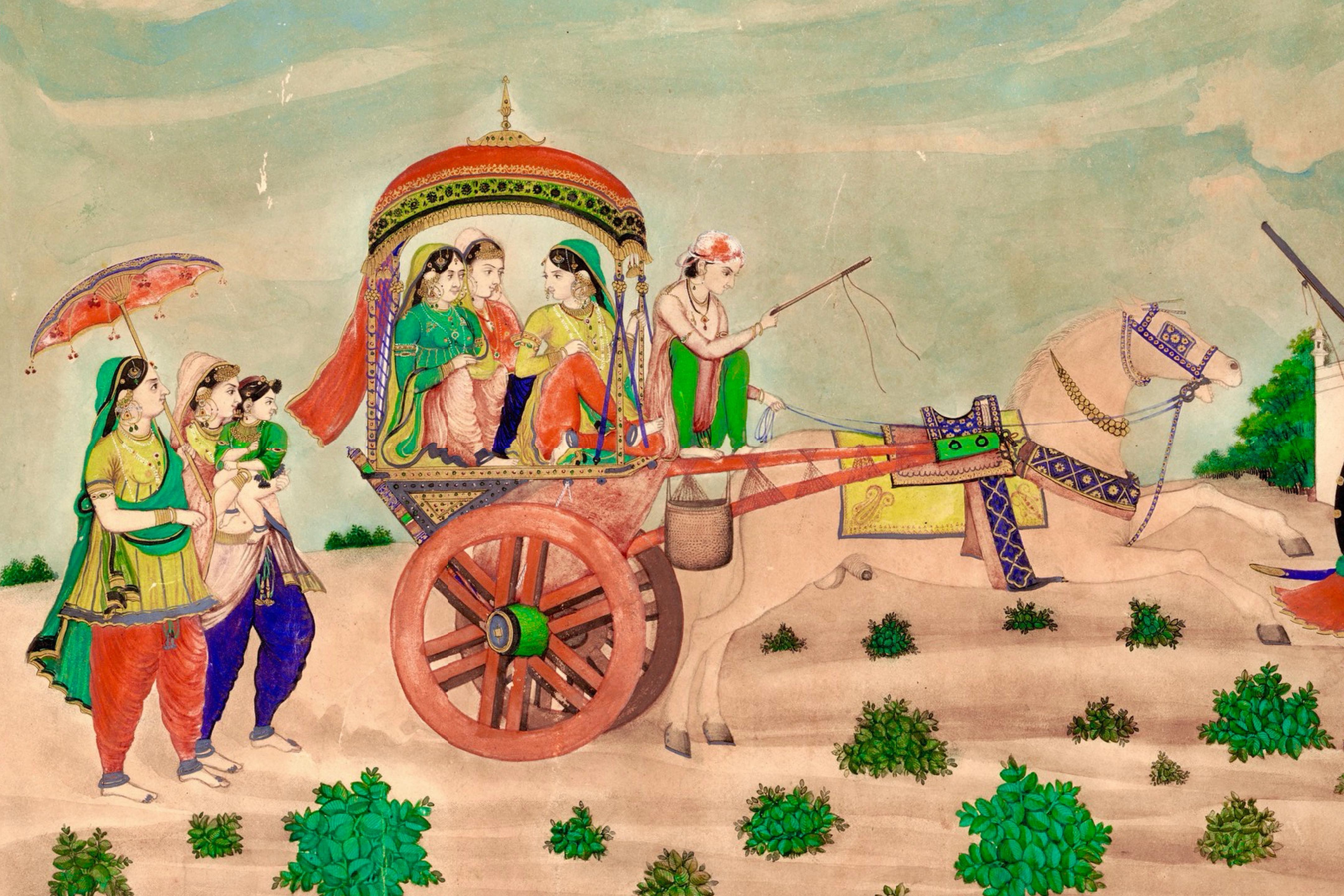
'Ladies Escorted in a Horse-Drawn Carriage', by Bishan Singh, ca.1860's

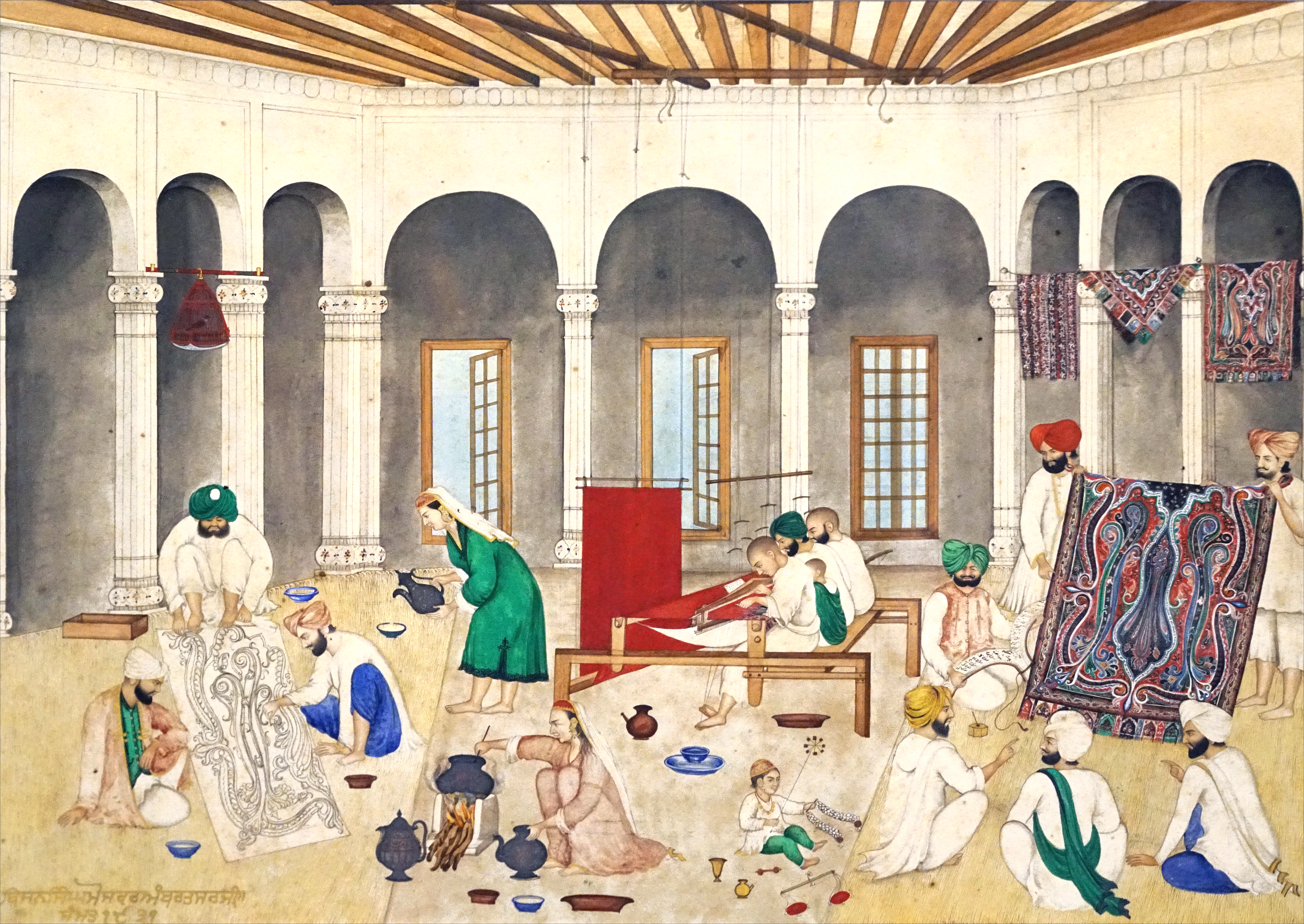
A shawl weaver's shop, by Bishan Singh, likely Amritsar, ca.1874–75
