= Kishan Singh (artist) =

Sikh artist (1836–1895)

Baba Kishan Singh Musawar
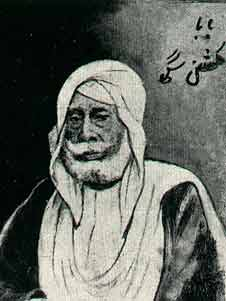
- Born: 1836
- Died: 1895 (aged 58–59)
- Known for: Painting
- Style: Sikh School
- Children: Kapur Singh

Kishan Singh (1836–1895), also known as Kishan Singh of Lahore, was a Sikh painter who specialized in mussawir (painters of miniatures). (Note: His personal name is alternatively spelt as 'Kishen'.) He was born into a Ramgarhia family and was the brother of Bishan Singh. Kishan Singh had been employed as a court painter in the Sikh states of Kapurthala and Patiala. Kishan Singh was employed by royal courts located in Amritsar, Kapurthala, and Lahore. Whilst working in Lahore, Kishan Singh helped facilitate the arrival of other artists.

Kishan Singh was skilled in illustration magnifying designs whereas his brother Bishan Singh was talented in depicting courtly durbar scenery.

Kishan Singh's son, Kapur Singh, became an accomplished artist himself.

== Gallery ==
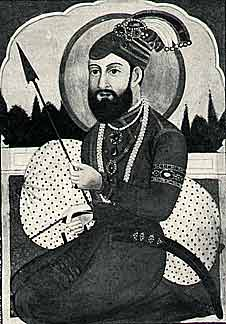
Portrait of Guru Gobind Singh by Kishan Singh
