= Kapur Singh (artist) =

Sikh artist

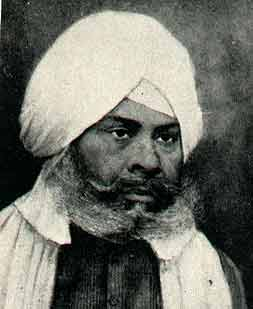
- Style: Sikh School
- Children: Sardul Singh

Kapur Singh (fl. 1860–1890), commonly referred to as Kapur Singh of Amritsar and also as Kapur Singh of Kapurthala, was a Sikh artist who experimented in murals, oil paintings, and works on paper. He was the son of Kishan Singh and nephew of Bishan Singh. He was amongst the most famous Sikh painters of the 19th century. He worked almost entirely in watercolour, focusing on Company paintings depicting normal life in the Punjab. Kapur Singh painted a large number of figure subjects, miniature in size. Kapur Singh would depict everyday life scenes of the local populace, such as different occupational workers in varying crafts and trades.

Kapur Singh closely observed the European painters whilst he was in Kapurthala, and made detailed note of their usage of oil painting procedures. After observing the foreign artists, Kapur Singh would adopt their techniques of oil and watercolour painting and become a master in it himself. However, Kapur also delved in producing miniatures.

Kapur Singh is noted for being the only late-19th century Sikh artist who successfully made the transition toward oil painting in the western style. Much of his surviving work was inscribed in English. His realistic portrayals betray his miniaturist-origins in the attention to detail evident in them. Though many works of his have survived, a fact owing to his popularity of the time, his works were never able to be innovative like that of his father and uncle before him. Percy Brown stated the following regarding Kapur Singh:

In the Punjab, at Lahore and Amritsar, the productions of several Sikh painters found favour at the end of the nineteenth century, their work showing a strange mixture of the East and West. One, Kapur Singh, painted a large number of figure subjects, miniature in size, and showing a very fair knowledge of drawing with considerable action[.]

— Percy Brown, Indian Painting (Calcutta: 1917), p. 56

Kapur Singh had a son named Sardul Singh, whom was an esteemed painter and photographer of Amritsar active around the year 1900.

== Gallery ==
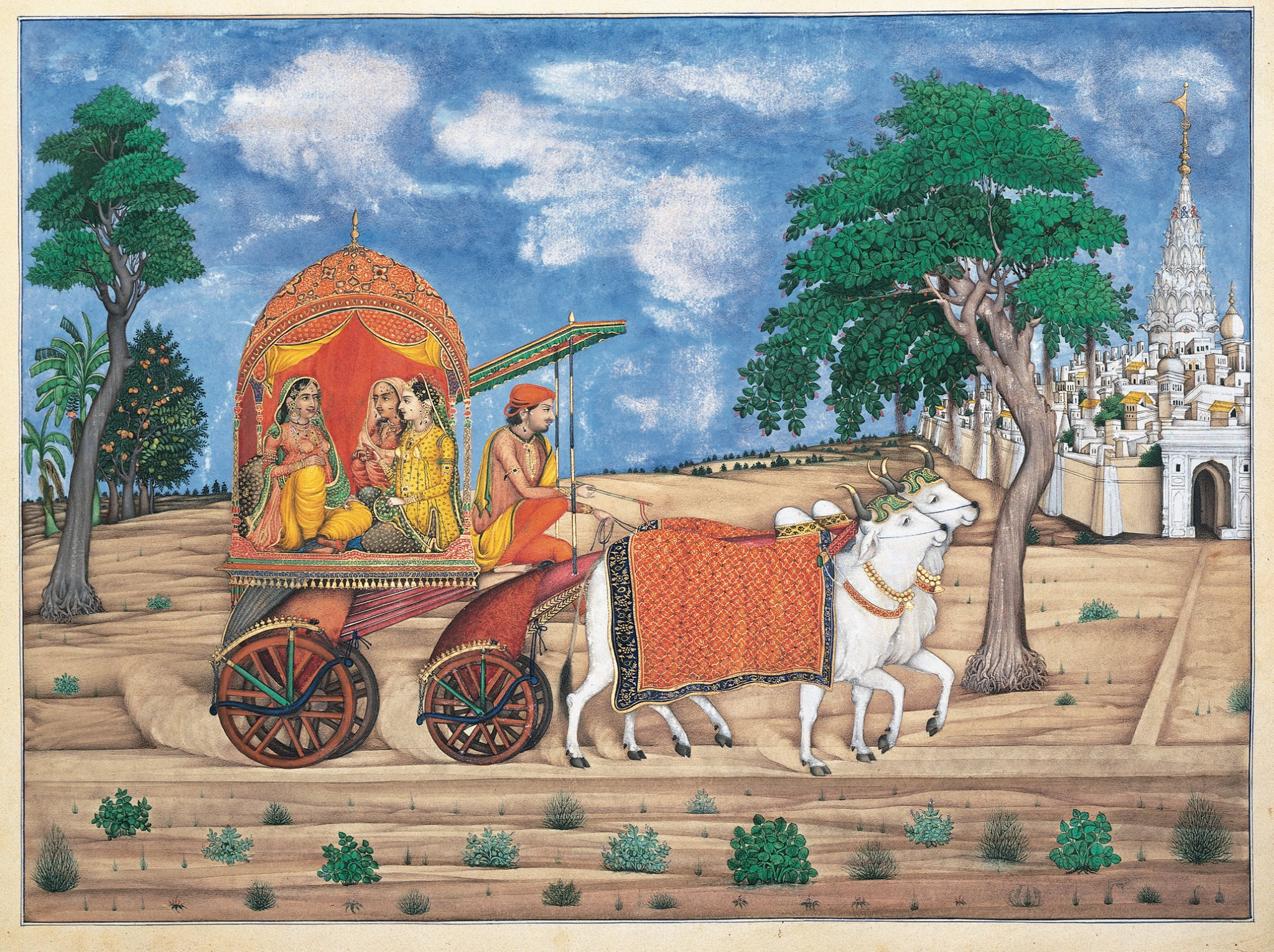
Ladies riding a cart, by Kishan Singh or Kapur Singh, ca.1874

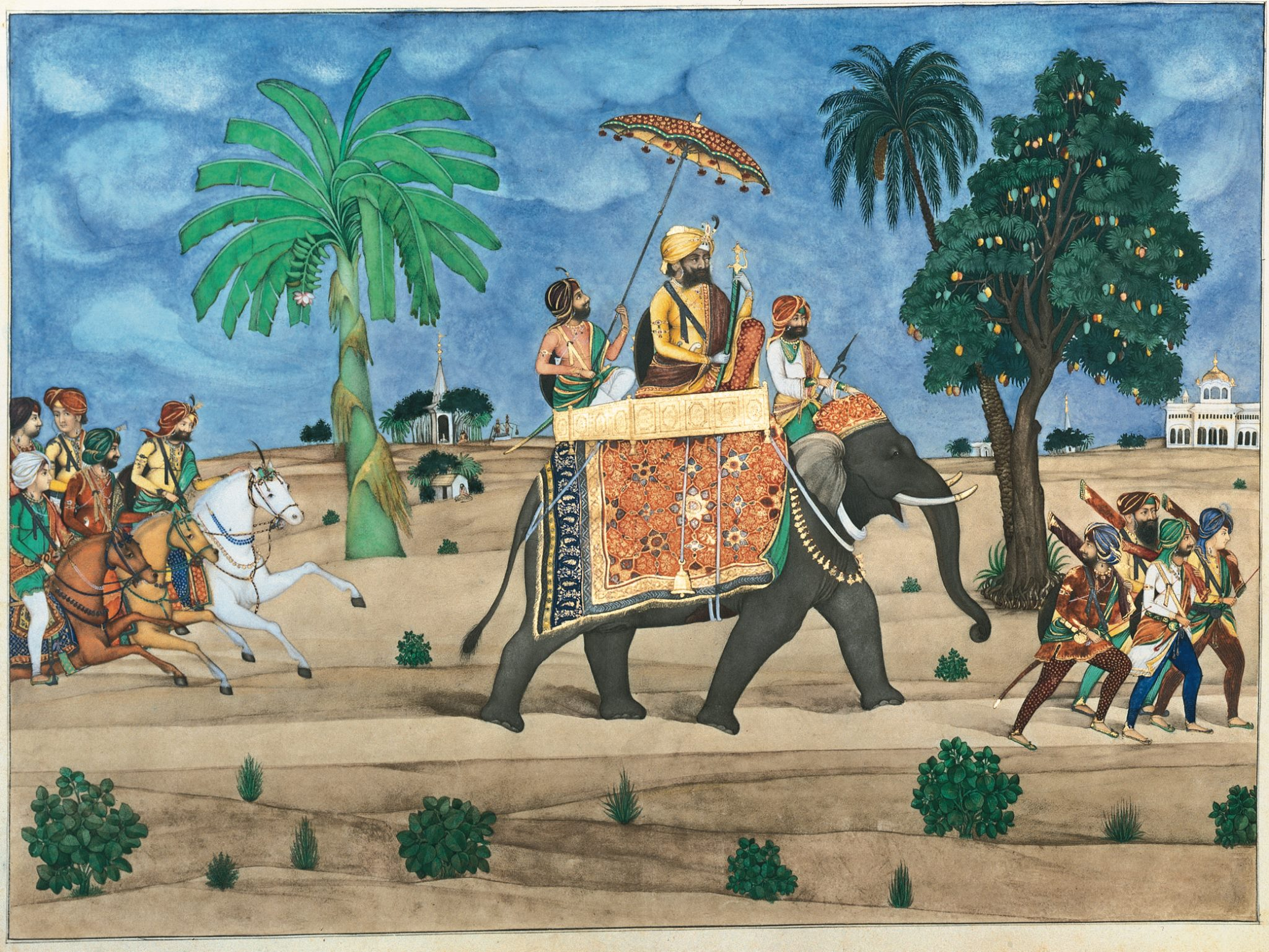
Gulab Singh riding on elephant, Kishan Singh or Kapur Singh, ca.1874

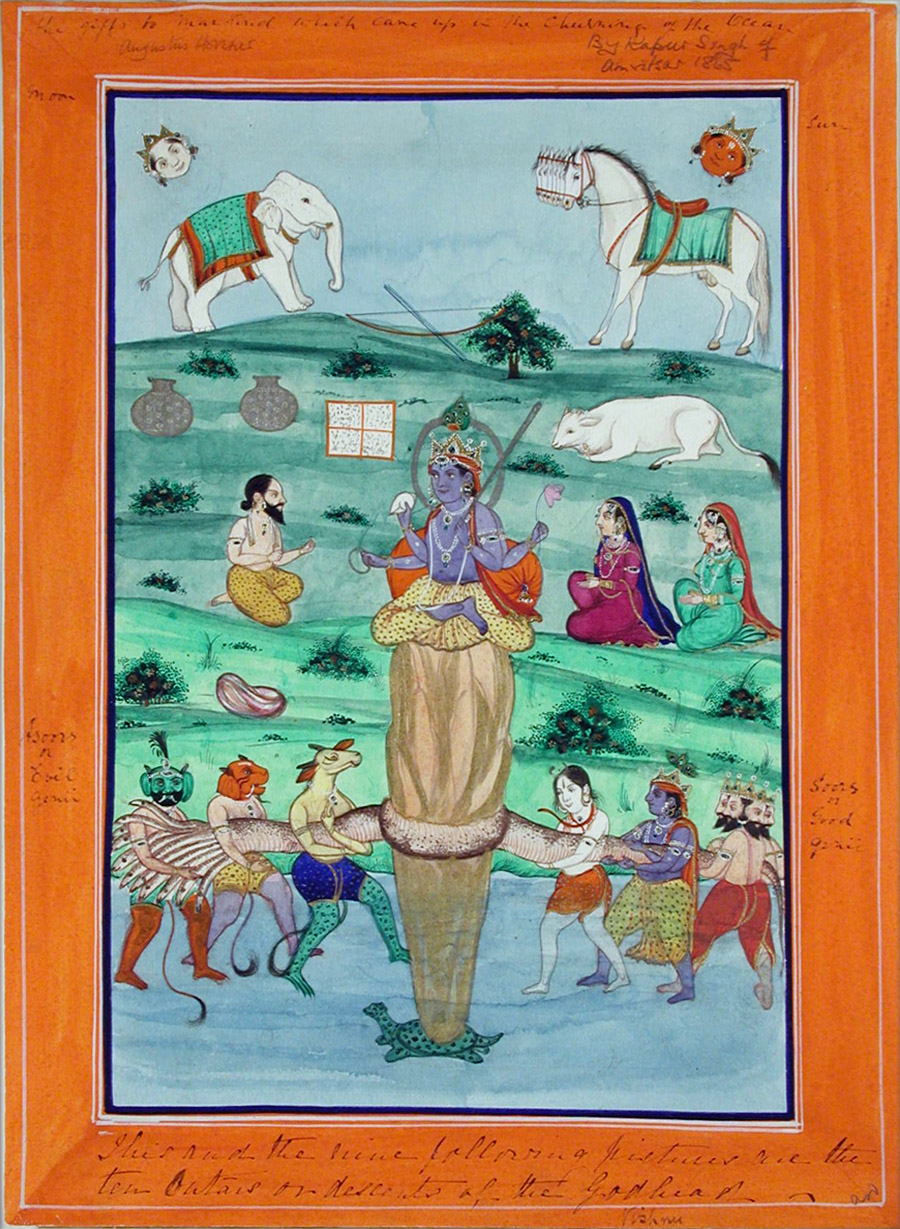
The Tortoise Avatar of Vishnu: Churning of the Milky Ocean, by Kapur Singh, ca.1865

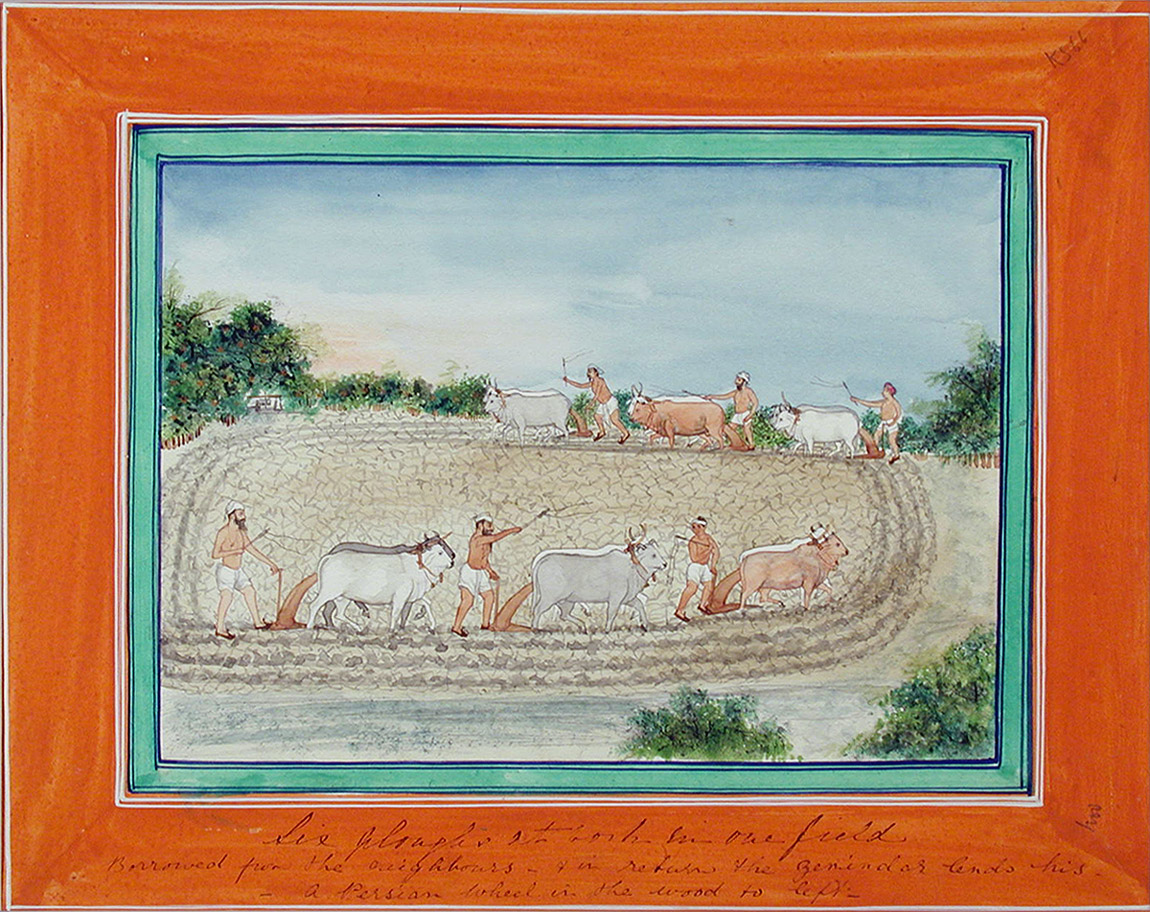
Six ox-ploughs at work in one field, by Kapur Singh, ca.1865

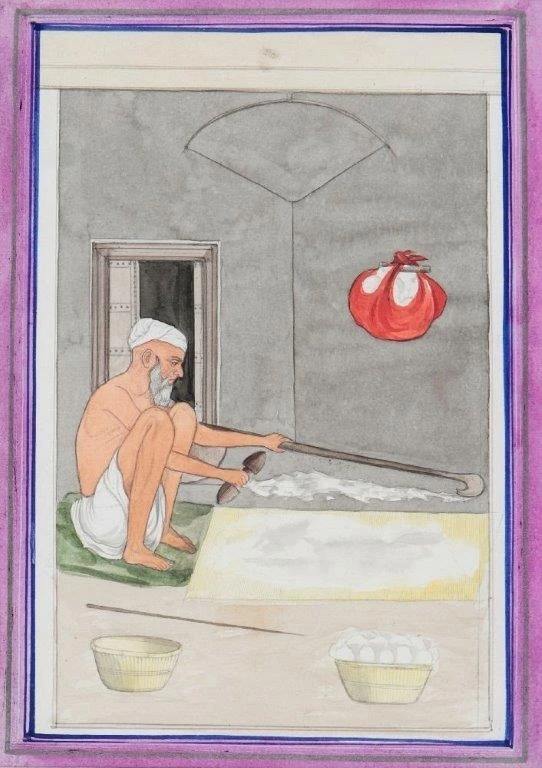
Study of a glassblower, by Kapur Singh, ca.1880

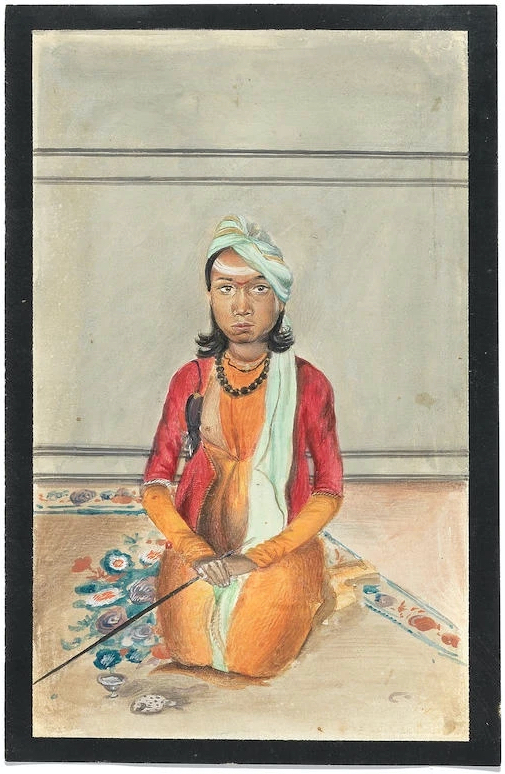
Watercolour of a boy, by Kapur Singh, ca.1866

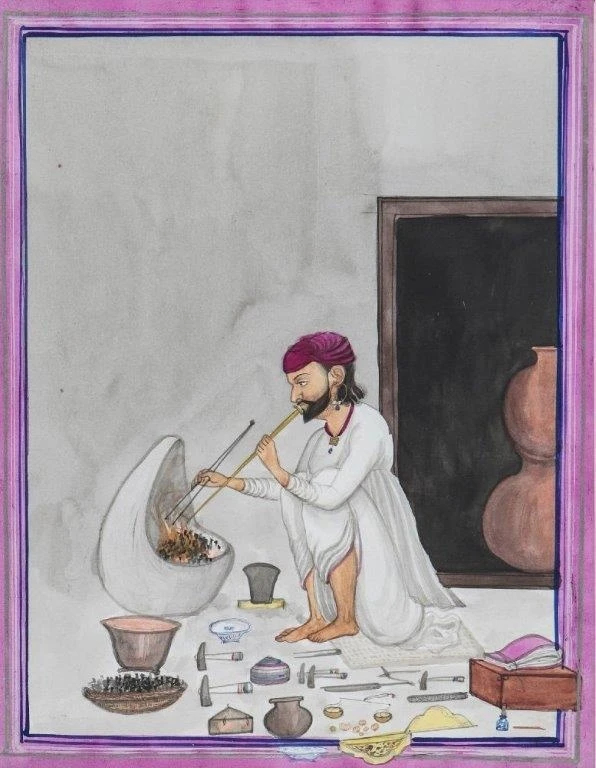
Study of a silversmith or jeweler, by Kapur Singh, ca.1880

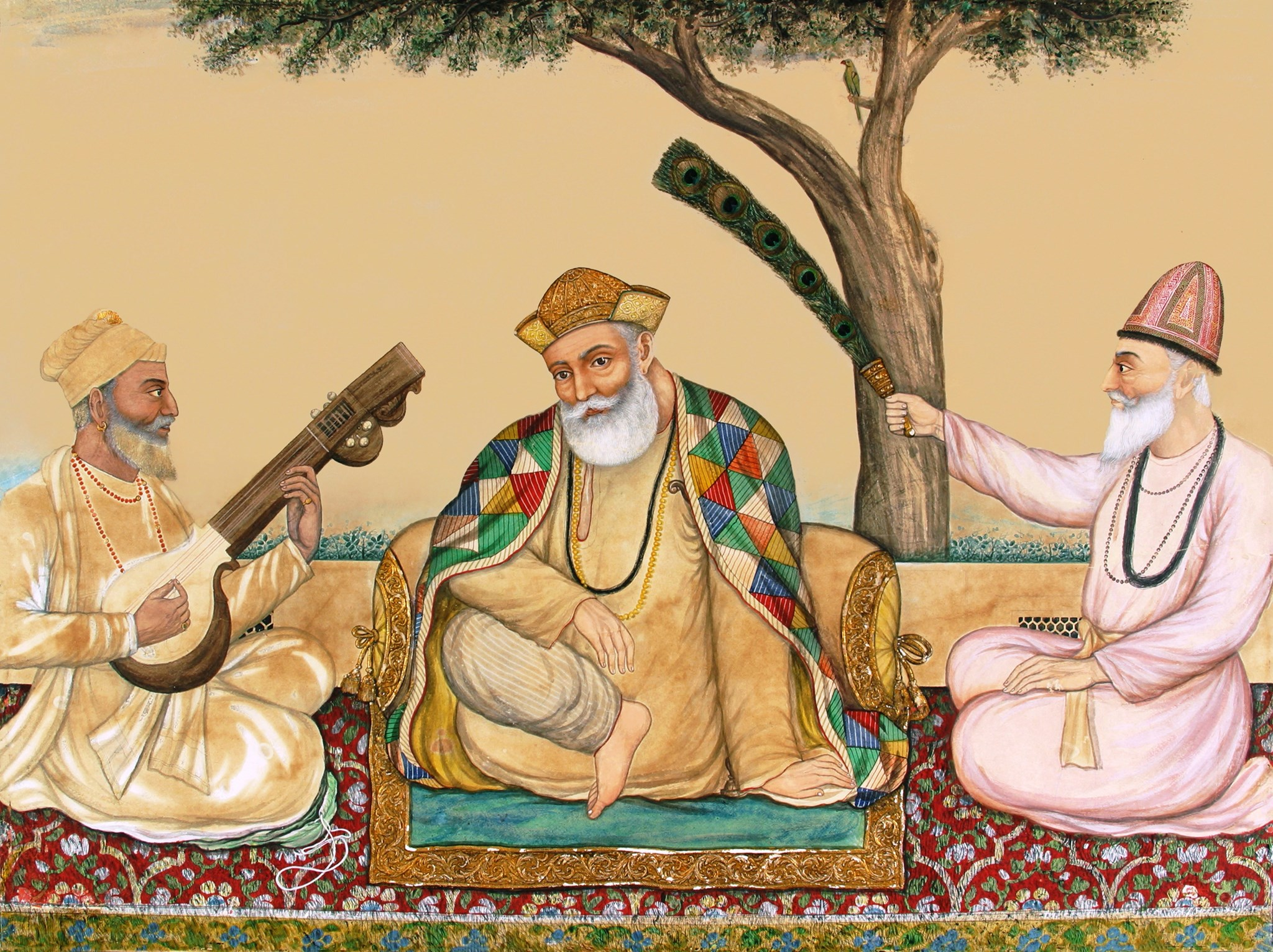
'Guru Nanak', by Kapur Singh

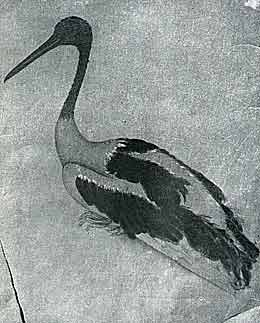
A duck, by Kapur Singh

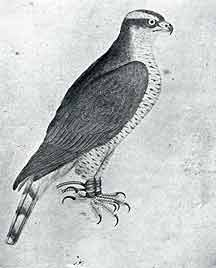
A hawk, by Kapur Singh
