= List of Indian artists =

This is a list of notable artists who were born in India and or have a strong association with India.

First	Middle	Last	Birth	Death	Notes
Nandalal		Bose	1882	1966	
Akbar		Padamsee	1928	2020	painter, printmaker
Sunil		Das	1939	2015	
Manishi		Dey	1909	1966	
Mukul	Chandra	Dey	1895	1989	printmaker
Kalipada		Ghoshal	1906	1995	
T.U.		Subramaniam	1924	1968	pseudonym Maniam
Benode	Behari	Mukherjee	1904	1980	
Annada		Munsi	1905	1985	painter, writer
Manu		Munsi	1924	2009	painter, sculptor
Sobha	Singh	Naqqashi	1901	1986	director, illustrator
Satyajit		Ray	1921	1992	
Jamini		Roy	1887	1972	
Amrita		Sher-Gil	1913	1941	Hungarian-Indian descent
P.M.		Sreenivasan	1919	1983	pseudonym Silpi
S.G.	Thakur	Singh	1899	1976	
Abanindranath		Tagore	1871	1951	
Gaganendranath		Tagore	1867	1938	
Rabindranath		Tagore	1861	1941	pseudonym Bhanusimha
Raja	Ravi	Varma	1848	1906	
Ramkinkar		Baij	1906	1989	painter, sculptor
Sattiraju		Lakshminarayana	1933	2014	pseudonym Bapu
Manjit		Bawa	1941	2008	
Bikash		Bhattacharjee	1940	2006	
Krishna		Reddy	1925	2018	printmaker, sculptor
Nek	Chand	Saini	1924	2015	sculptor
Bijan		Choudhury	1931	2012	
Dhiraj		Choudhury	1936	2018	
Edmund	Thomas	Clint	1976	1983	child prodigy who painted over 25,000 paintings during his life of 6 years 11 months
Prafulla		Dahanukar	1934	2014	
M.R.D.		Dattan	1935	2006	sculptor
Kanu		Desai	1907	1980	director, illustrator
John		Wilkins	1927	1991	
Somalal		Shah	1905	1994	
Sayed	Haider	Raza	1922	2016	
Piraji		Sagara	1931	2014	painter, sculptor
Mohan		Samant	1924	2004	
Francis	Newton	Souza	1924	2002	
Srihari		Bholekar	1941	2018	painter, sculptor, printmaker
Srimati		Y.G.	1926	2007	painter, dancer
Kalpathi	Ganpathi	Subramanyan	1924	2016	
Anil	Kumar	Dutta	1933	2006	painter, writer
Sundaram		Rajam	1919	2010	
B.		Prabha	1933	2001	
Rajan		Krishnan	1933	2001	
Bhupen		Khakkar	1934	2003	
Abdul	Kadar	Khatri	1961	2019	master craftsmen, printmaker
Maqbool	Fida	Husain	1915	2011	director, painter
Satish		Gujral	1925	2020	
Vasudeo	S.	Gaitonde	1924	2001	
Badri		Narayan	1929	2013	illustrator, writer
Rabin		Mondal	1929	2019	
K.K.		Menon	1925	1999	
Srimati	Priyadarshini	Lal	1959	2019	painter, poet
Zarina		Hashmi	1937	2020	printmaker, sculptor
Pilloo		Pochkhanawala	1923	1986	sculptor
Gogi	Saroj	Pal	1945	2024	
Mrinalini		Mukherjee	1949	2015	sculptor
Lalitha		Lajmi	1932	2023	
Latika		Katt	1948	2025	
Pratima		Devi	1893	1969	
Hema		Upadhyay	1972	2015	sculptor
Atasi		Barua	1921	2016	

== Contemporary artists ==
- Dhruvi Acharya (born 1971), visual artist
- Ratnadeep Adivrekar (born 1974)
- Anurag Anand (born 1978), visual artist and writer
- Sekar Ayyanthole (born 1954)
- Bhuri Bai (1968), Bhil artist
- Madhuri Bhaduri (born 1958)
- Dimpy Bhalotia (born 1987), street photographer
- Maya Burman (born 1971)
- Jogen Chowdhury (born 1939)
- Daku, pseudonymous graffiti artist
- Vikash Maharaj (born 1957), artist
- Kurchi Dasgupta (born 1974)
- Shashikant Dhotre (born 1982), drawing, painter, installations
- Gurpreet Singh Dhuri (born 1983)
- Atul Dodiya (born 1959), painter
- Aman Singh Gulati (born 2000), world's first almond artist
- Satyendra Pakhalé (born 1967)
- Manav Gupta (born 1967)
- Shilpa Gupta (born 1976)
- Saba Hasan (born 1962) contemporary artist
- S. Jithesh (born 1974)
- Reena Saini Kallat (born 1973)
- Anish Kapoor (born 1954)
- Mohammed Yusuf Khatri (born 1967), Bagh printer
- Sanjay Khatri (born 1987), ballet dancer
- Bharti Kher (born 1969), painter, sculptor and installation artist
- Nandita Kumar (born 1981), new media artist
- Paris Mohan Kumar
- Madhan (born 1947)
- Paresh Maity (born 1965), painter and sculptor
- Ravi Mandlik (born 1960), painter
- Kailash Chandra Meher (born 1954), painter
- Bhavna Mehta (born 1968), paper-cut artist
- Anjolie Ela Menon (born 1940), painter
- Amitabh Mitra (born 1955)
- Samir Mondal (born 1952), watercolourist
- N.K.P. Muthukoya (born 1941)
- Balan Nambiar (born 1937), sculptor, painter and research scholar
- Satyendra Pakhale (born 1967)
- Gogi Saroj Pal (born 1945)
- Indrani Pal-Chaudhuri (born 1983), photographer, film director
- Aditya Pande (born 1976), painter, sculptor, digital artist
- Jayant Parikh (born 1940)
- Baiju Parthan (born 1956), painter
- Gieve Patel (born 1940)
- Sudarsan Pattnaik (born 1977), sand artist
- Pranava Prakash (born 1979)
- Gargi Raina (born 1961), painter
- Devajyoti Ray (born 1974)
- Sajitha R. Shankar (born 1967)
- Suvigya Sharma (born 1983)
- Ram Chandra Shukla (1925–2016)
- Vibhor Sogani (born 1967)
- Karuna Sukka (born 1980), printmaker
- Vivan Sundaram (born 1943), installation artist
- K.R.Sunil (born 1975)
- Surekha, artist, video and photo installations
- Thukral & Tagra (born 1976, born 1979)
- K. P. Thomas (artist) (born 1951)
- Tom Vattakuzhy (born 1967)

== See also ==
- List of Indian women artists
- List of most expensive Indian artists
