= T. R. Mahalingam =

T. R. Mahalingam is an Indian name and may refer to:

- T. R. Mahalingam (actor) (1923–1978), Indian actor and singer in Tamil cinema
- T. R. Mahalingam (flautist) (1926–1986), Indian classical musician
- Mali (cartoonist) or T. R. Mahalingam, Indian cartoonist
