= Oindrilla Maity Surai =

Indian art curator and critic

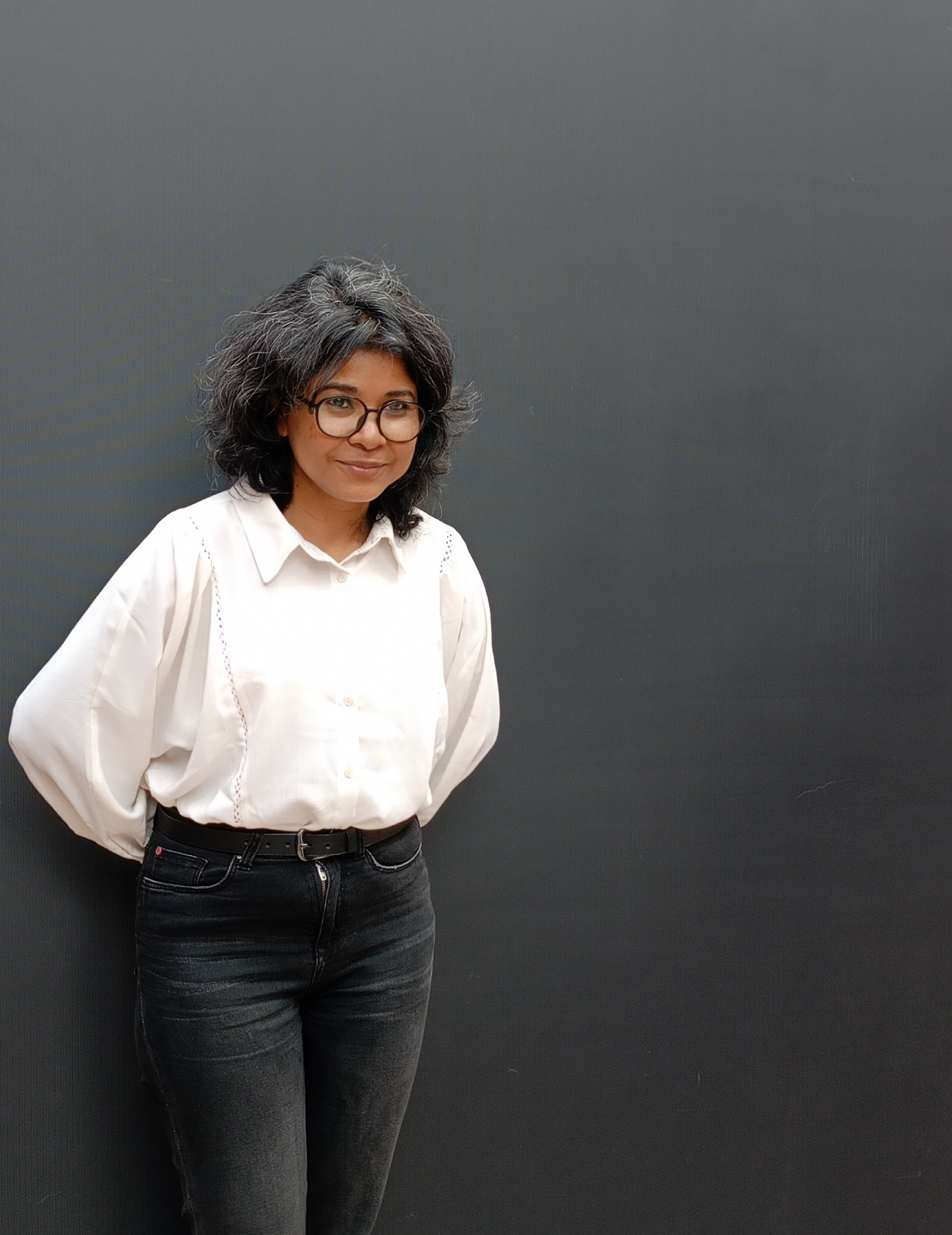
Oindrilla Maity Surai at the venue of Beyond the Edge, Kolkata, in January 2024.

Oindrilla Maity Surai (born 1978) is an Indian independent curator, art critic, and pedagogue based in Kolkata. She has curated exhibitions beyond the paradigms of the commercial gallery. Her major contributions lie in her converting the exhibition spaces as sites of resistance in the post-Covid 19 era, following the country's political conditions and experimenting with the anatomy of what may be termed as the biennale mode (at a rudimentary stage) of exhibition making in the city's public sphere. She has also participated in several community- based art projects as an artist.

== Work ==
=== Curation ===
Oindrilla Maity Surai has curated Erasures and Resistances (January, 2024) for the first edition of Beyond the Edge, Kolkata, the first ever public art exhibition proposed on a biennale model in the city in terms of production of meaning and knowledge, orbiting around research and experimentation. The exhibition featuring artists Gigi Scaria, Ram Rahman, Pushpamala N, Inder Salim Madhuja Mukherjee, Sharmila Samant Anupam Saikia and Saikat Surai among others also included an artists' collective, Panjeri Artists' Union and two plays, Tagore's Tasher Desh staged by Panihati Patrak (an environment activist group) and Atha Hidimba Katha by Birati Samuho (an LGBTQ community), throwing light on a constitutive pluralism that pulsated with a polyphonic tone. The exhibition, which aimed at 're-introducing larger and pressing political and aesthetic concerns relevant to the country today' turned out into a ''...stage for a theatre of resistance.'' Subsequently, it grew into a cultural space where exchanges among artists, scholars and students took place to address issues of the day. The exhibition also hoped to create a disruption of settled practices and generate a new level of spectatorship, away from the populist art practices in the city. Apart from displaying a wide range of exhibits including installations, drawings, plays, performances, and videos, the project is also working on a chapter of archiving oral histories in the locality, spearheaded by Nrisingha Prasad Bhaduri. How Tomorrow Might Be(2021) another exhibition curated by Surai for the second edition of the Behala Art Fest was conceptualized in the context of "the new citizenship thrust, the abrogation of the special status of Kashmir, the plight of migrant workers during the lockdown and the contentious farm laws". She curated Tracing a Human Trail: Metaphors of the Frontiers at Khoj, New Delhi (2010–'11), for the first curatorial residency programme in the country, juried by Geeta Kapur and Anita Dube. Her commercial shows include Whose History? Which Stories? ((2012), Shrine Empire, New Delhi) which explores how "The natural human urge to connect with each other through myths, helps in identifying the patterns of thought. It is also an attempt to trace the patterns, tendencies and future moorings of visual art through its current traits,". Facets of a People was curated for Gallery OED, Kochi, (2009) orbiting around the portrayal of the vast expanse of a collective psyche featured the work of Rajan Krishnan, T. M.Azis among others. Though her earliest curatorial ventures took place in the commercial galleries, Surai has always shown a preponderance of curating exhibitions in the public sphere.

=== Writings ===
Oindrilla Maity Surai writes in Bangla and English. Bangla Boier Drishtijagat O Vidyasagarer Bhavna, an essay on Ishwar Chandra Vidyasagar, was published by Ananda Publishers. Her essay, Socio-Spatial Dialectics and the Right to the City on the practices of Bengali visual artists with a history of the Partition has been brought out by the Partition Studies Quarterly. Among her translational work, An Answer to Today's Crisis: A Leninist View by Slavoj Žižek in Bangla was published by Swaraantar. Very recently, Sangbad Pratidin has featured one of her essays, দুর্গাপুজোর শিল্প-সমারোহ আদৌ কি পাবলিক-আর্ট? on the making of art in the realm of Durga Puja on its digital portal, Robbar.in. Two of her essays, বিজ্ঞাপন শিল্প, উত্তর আধুনিকতা ও অন্নদার 'মুন্সীয়ানা' and ইন্দুবালার খেরোর খাতা featuring in the same digital portal, center around decolonization through modern Indian advertisements and decolnization through epistemic shift, respectively. She has also written on art and culture for children. Maity is a regular contributor to Take on Art magazine.

=== Documentary Film ===
Nona Joler Dinolipi (2025) which archives the beliefs, practices and interviews of the Bakkhali coastal poets' community, Samudra Janala, is Maity's first documentary film, co-directed with Saikat Surai.

== Education ==
Surai graduated in Art History from the Rabindra Bharati University, Kolkata. She has a doctoral degree in Cultural Studies from the Department of Culture Studies, Visva-Bharati, Santiniketan (2022). She has graduated from the Gwangju Biennale International Curatorial Course (2012)

== Awards and grants ==
Surai is the first recipient of the Art ScribesAward (2011) from India for her writings on visual arts and was subsequently invited by the Gwangju Metropolitan City Museum of Art, Gwangju, South Korea for the first research residency under their Asian Curators' Exchange Program. She was also a participant of the first curatorial residency at Khoj International Artists Association, New Delhi, supported by the India Foundation for the Arts, Bengaluru (2010).
