= Maniam (name) =

Maniam is the nickname of Indian illustrator T. U. Subramaniam. It may also refer to the following individuals:

== Given name ==
- Maniam Pachaiappan (born 1968), Malaysian footballer

== Patronym ==
- Aaron Maniam (born 1979), Singaporean poet
- K. S. Maniam (1942–2020), Malaysian writer
- Moorthy Maniam (1969–2005), Malaysian Army personnel
