= Rabin Mondal =

Indian painter (1929–2019)

- Born: Rabindra Nath Mondal; 1929; Howrah, India
- Died: 2 July 2019 (aged 90); Bidhannagar, West Bengal, India

Rabin Mondal, born as Rabindra Nath Mondal, (1929 – 2 July 2019) was an Indian painter from Howrah, West Bengal. He was an Indian artist who was a founding member of the Calcutta Painters. He lived and worked in relative obscurity until retrospective exhibitions of his work in Kolkata, New Delhi and Bombay brought him to India's national attention in 2005.

As a child, Rabin Mondal witnessed the devastating effects of the 1943 Great Bengal Famine and the pre-Partition riots that ravaged the state. These incidents have since translated onto his canvases, mirroring the horror and suffering of the people

== Early life and family ==
Mondal was born in Howrah, an overcrowded urban extension of Calcutta. His family had prospered in business in the late 19th century. Rajendra Narayan Mondal (1792 to 1860), Dewan of Narayanganj in Bengal was an ancestor, and one of his sons Rajendranarayan received the title of Raja. The narrow lane where Rabin's paternal home stands was named after his grandfather Fakirdas Mondal. But the pressures of an extended Bengali household forced the young Rabin to live with not only his brothers and sisters, but also his aunts, uncles, great aunts and uncles, and also his cousins. Though the Mondal family had a highly educated and upper-middle-class background, Howrah was known for its overcrowded slums and impoverished migrant workers who toiled in various grimy industries. It was an environment that caused the young Rabin to take note of the realities of life and its struggles.

Like many Indian artists of his generation, Rabin was deeply affected by the Bengal famine of 1943, the struggle for India's independence, and the subsequent partition of his native Bengal.

In May 1976, Rabin married Bani Mitra, also an artist by profession, and 18 years younger than Rabin. The couple settled down in their Howrah residence but eventually moved to Salt Lake in 1996 when a bunch of artistes formed a co-operative society and was granted a 14-cottah plot by the then finance minister of West Bengal, Ashok Mitra. It was around this time that Bani was diagnosed with cancer. She died in 2000. The couple had no children.

== Education and career ==
Rabin Mondal graduated in commerce from Calcutta University in 1952. His first formal education in art was at the Indian College of Art and Draughtsmanship, Calcutta. He continued his artistic studies at the Asutosh Museum of Indian Art of the University of Calcutta.

In 1964 Rabin and what is now known as the "Group of Eight", (which consisted of Nikhil Biswas, Prokash Karmakar, Bijan Chowdhury, Gopal Sanyal, Bimal Banerjee, Mahim Rudra, Gunbritt Svensson and Mondal himself) formed the Calcutta Painters. This lively group of artists worked to promote modernist art not only in Calcutta, but throughout India, becoming nationally known in the process.

Rabin's Unfinished Work

Mondal worked out of his Howrah studio, churning out a series of "kings" and "queens" painted with oil on canvas. These are perhaps Mondal's best known works, depicting tragic looking figures, seemingly suffering from paranoia and fear, yet ironically termed kings and queens. Some of the highlights of this series were the works Man Acting as King, King Being Appeased, King Making Confession, and King and his Assassin. Mondal also produced a series of "deities", which sometimes seem to merge thematically with his "queens". The artist's deities are generally depicted with radiate crowns, whereas his kings and queens are not. Other favorite subjects of the artist were the brothel and the harem, which he depicted in canvases such as Event in Red Light Area and Orgy.

"Animal" - Acrylic on Board, 1993

Though some of Mondal's best canvases have an obvious cubist influence, stylistically his work has been predominantly expressionist, a reaction to the tormented humanity that surrounded him in Calcutta, and the tragic events of his formative years.

Rabin Mondal's work can be found in the collections of The National Gallery of Modern Art, New Delhi, Osians Art Archive, Mumbai, The Birla Academy of Art and Culture, Kolkata, and the Jane and Kito de Boer Collection, Dubai.
