= Silpi =

Indian artist (1919–1983)

- Born: P.M. Sreenivasan; 1919
- Died: 1983 (aged 63–64)
- Known for: Illustrator

P.M. Sreenivasan (1919-1983), who adopted the name Silpi, was a Tamil illustrator, best known for his detailed renditions of Tamil architecture and sculpture in Ananda Vikatan magazine.

== Life and career ==
Sreenivasan studied art at the Madras School of Art, later the Government College of Fine Arts, Chennai, where he excelled in pen and ink line sketches.

At Ananda Vikatan, Sreenivasan used to cover political and social events, portraying them in his drawings. He was mentored by the magazine's senior artist Mali, who gave him the name Silpi (sculptor), on observing the artist's skill in rendering temple buildings and temple sculpture. A deeply religious person, Silpi developed his skill into a unique specialization over his twenty-two years with Ananda Vikatan. From 1947 to 1960, his drawings of temples of South India appeared every week in Ananda Vikatan under the title Thennattu Selvangal (Treasures of South India).

He was working in Ananda vikatan from 1945 to 1967 as Artist. After leaving Ananda Vikatan, Silpi did illustrations for Bhavan's Journal, Kalai Magal, Thinamani Kathir, Amuthasurabhi, etc. He was a mentor to the illustrator Padmavasan.

Silpi toured temples in every nook and cranny of South India. His drawings of temple sculpture were sketched on location at night, after the devotees had finished their darshan. For his followers, he provided the rare opportunity to view the innermost sanctums of temples. Every detail of the deity's ornaments was rendered accurately. Devotees kept his drawings in their prayer rooms to worship their gods and goddesses.
