= Paris Mohan Kumar =

Indian artist

Paris Mohan Kumar is an UNESCO honored artist and environmental activist from Mahe, Kerala, India.

== Early career ==
Mohan Kumar began his art pursuits in Puducherry, India and later moved to Paris. In 1988, he was listed by UNESCO as one of the 40 greatest artists in the world.
