= Tom Vattakuzhy =

Indian artist (born 1967)

- Born: Tom Vattakuzy; 31 May 1967 (age 59); Muvattupuzha, Eranakulam, Kerala
- Education: Santiniketan in 1991 & Maharaja Sayajirao University of Baroda in 1996
- Occupations: Artist, Painter
- Spouse: Ceena
- Children: Aditya & Atheeth
- Parent(s): Joseph & Mariyakutty
- Awards: Kerala Lalithakala Akademi in 1997

Tom Vattakuzhy (31 May 1967, Kalloorkad, Muvattupuzha, Eranakulam District, Kerala) is an Indian painter, Printmaker, and Illustrator. His works have been cited for their use of light effects.

== Early life and education ==
Tom Vattakuzhy was born into a rural agricultural family at Kalloorkad, showed an artistic inclination at an early phase of his schooling. He completed a diploma course in art at a local art school at Muvattupuzha and then attended art lessons at a couple of art schools before he joined Kerala Kalapeetom in Ernakulam from where he learned about the possibilities of higher education in art. But, his family was not supportive of him to leave the job of a school art teacher which he had already entered into and go for further studies in art. He spent years doing the job, painting portraits and illustrating periodicals until he found a new lease of energy in the tutelage of senior artists like M. V. Devan and Prof. M.V. Krisnan. He Joined Kalabhawan, Santiniketan Visva-Bharati University located at West Bengal in 1991 and completed bachelor's degree in printmaking in 1996 followed by a master's degree at the Faculty of Fine Arts, Maharaja Sayajirao University of Baroda of Baroda in 1998. He came into close contact with doyen artists like K. G. Subramanyan and Somnath Hore during his study at santiniketan, that played a pivotal role in shaping his choices in art and life. He taught art at the various fine art collages, Raja Ravi Varma College of Fine Arts, Mavelikkara & College of Fine Arts Trivandrum in Kerala for about four years and subsequently in Al Khor International School in Qatar for about eight years. Though his job earned him a living and provided for painting; realizing that it stunts his art practice, he left the job in 2010 and returned home to devote more time to his art.

== Life in art ==
Being a village-born boy, Tom's earliest inspirations came from matchbox- pictures, magazine illustrations and the altarpieces of his nearby churches. His Christian upbringing has an influence on his works. It gives his works a humanistic and often ethereal hue. His Early Illustrations for the novels by P. Padmarajan, N.P. Mohammed, C. Radhakrishnan and the like in Mathrubhumi Azhchappathippu, remotely reminiscing the drawings of Shiavax Chavda, were noted for its bold and free-flowing lines. Later on his illustrations which he preferred to call ‘story paintings’ turned to be more painterly reappraising its hitherto conventions and synthesising it with the visual syntax of his paintings. One of his illustrations appeared in a mainstream literary magazine in 2016 with an allusive resonance of The Last Supper (Leonardo da Vinci) ruffled up the feathers of religious sentiments of the Christian Church and uproar was created despite its withdrawal. A Magazine In Kerala Is Facing The Ire Of The Church Even After Issuing An Apology from the newsstands., Tom's Paintings do not subscribe to the tendencies of mere formalistic explorations of aesthetical pleasure, but investigate the possibilities of establishing a connecting thread to the human soul that would invoke a mystic, transcendental visual experience in the viewer. Though he draws subjects for his paintings from the familiar world around him, as art critic Johny M.L points out that; ‘....when we see them within the emblematic narratives that Tom chooses to paint they look ethereal, distanced and divined. Clad in a Renaissance hue, each mundane act of life turns Eucharistic’.

== Awards ==
- 1998 AIFACS All India Fine Arts and Crafts Society Award, New Delhi
- 1997 AIFACS All India Fine Arts and Crafts Society Award, New Delhi
- 1997 Kerala Lalithakala Akademi Award, Govt. of Kerala
- 1996 Highly Commended Certificate, Kerala Lalithakala Akademi, Govt. of Kerala
- 1996 National Scholarship, Ministry of Human Resource Development, New Delhi.
- 1995 Haren Das Award, Academy of Fine Arts, Calcutta
- 1992-1996 Merit Scholarship, Kala Bhavan, Viswa-Bharati University, Santiniketan.
