= M. R. D. Dattan =

Indian artist, (1935 – 2006)

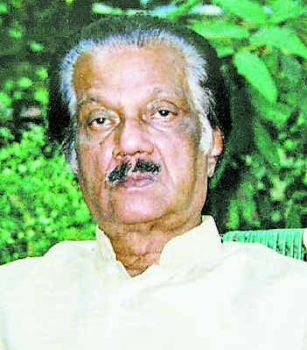

M R D Dattan (7 July 1935 – 1 August 2006) was an artist and sculptor in the state of Kerala, India. Dattan's works include statues of Mahatma Gandhi, Swami Vivekananda and Sree Narayana Guru. He had created more than 200 statues of Sree Narayana Guru alone.

He was the son of Raman (who was the Palace painter of Kochi royal family) and Kavootti. After his studies at Madras School of Art, he returned to Kerala to become the director of Cochin School of Art that his father established.

His other works include statues of C. Kesavan, Vallathol Narayanamenon, Dr. Ambedkar, Panambilli Govindamenon, R. Venkata Raman and "Guruvayur Kesavan". He was also the recipient of the Lalith Kala Akademi fellowship.
