= S. G. Thakur Singh =

Indian artist (1899–1976)

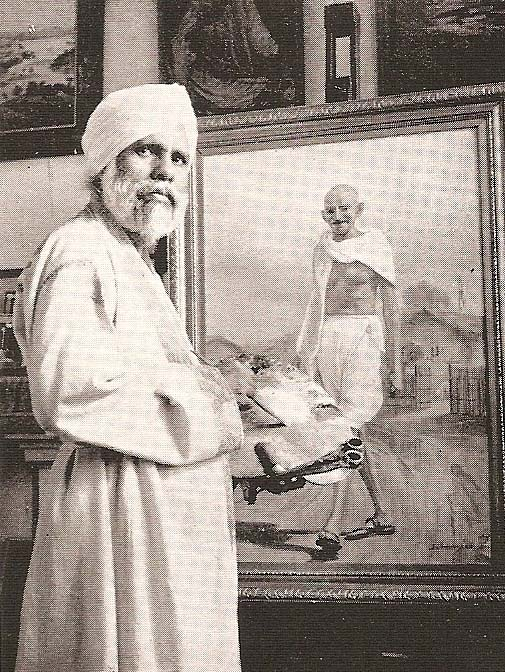
- S.G. Thakur Singh
- Born: 1899
- Died: 1976 (aged 76–77)
- Occupation: Indian artist

Sardar Ganda Thakar Singh (1899–1976), popularly known as S. G. Thakur Singh, artist who painted in oils, pastels and water colour. He is mostly remembered for his works depicting landscapes, portraiture, and still-lifestyle. He worked in the Indian film industries located in Bombay and Calcutta. He was acquainted with members of the Bengal renaissance movement of art, such as Nand Lal Bose and the Tagore brothers. (Note: The Tagore brothers referred to are Abanindranath Tagore and Gaganendranath Tagore.) Although he had been familiar with traditional Sikh methods of art created by his predecessors, he preferred modern methods and was not influenced by the indigenous methods. He was permanently patronized and paid a commission by many Indian royal houses, such as Kota, Udaipur, Bhopal, Kashmir, Dongarpur, Travancore, Nawan Nagar, Bikaner, Patiala, Kapurthala, and several other Indian princely states. Ordhendra Coomar Gangoly was his appreciative critic. He was the founder of the Indian Academy of Fine Arts and the Thakar Singh School of Arts.

== Early life ==
He was born in 1890 into a Ramgarhia family in the tiny farming village of Verka, located near Amritsar, Punjab, India. He received some art training from Mohammed Alam at V. D. J. Technical Institute in Lahore. After this training, he would find success as an artist.

Interviewed at the age of 74, Singh said that when he was seventeen, "I was forced by my guardians to join the Victoria Diamond Hindu Technical Institute, Lahore, to take up an engineering course. I wasted there two years and left it in disgust."When he returned to his village his former teacher, Mohammed Alam, persuaded him to come to Mumbai, where Alam had secured a job as a scene-painter in a Mumbai theatre. While in Mumbai, Singh worked both at odd jobs in the studio and on his own, with Alam guiding him.

"One fine morning" Singh recalls, "I was busy painting a landscape at Chowpati Beach, Mumbai, when a couple suddenly stopped beside me and began admiring my painting which was, by that time, almost complete. The gentlemen, an influential Parsi editor of a Bombay Magazine, goaded me into sending the painting to an exhibition of the Simla Fine Arts Society." There his painting won the first prize of Rs. 500, among the landscapes. I was then only eighteen, and you can well imagine my joy and pride at getting the prize.

Throughout his life he had many patrons. Rabindra Nath Tagore, Dr. Rajendra Prasad and artists and critics have paid tribute to his work.

== Later career ==
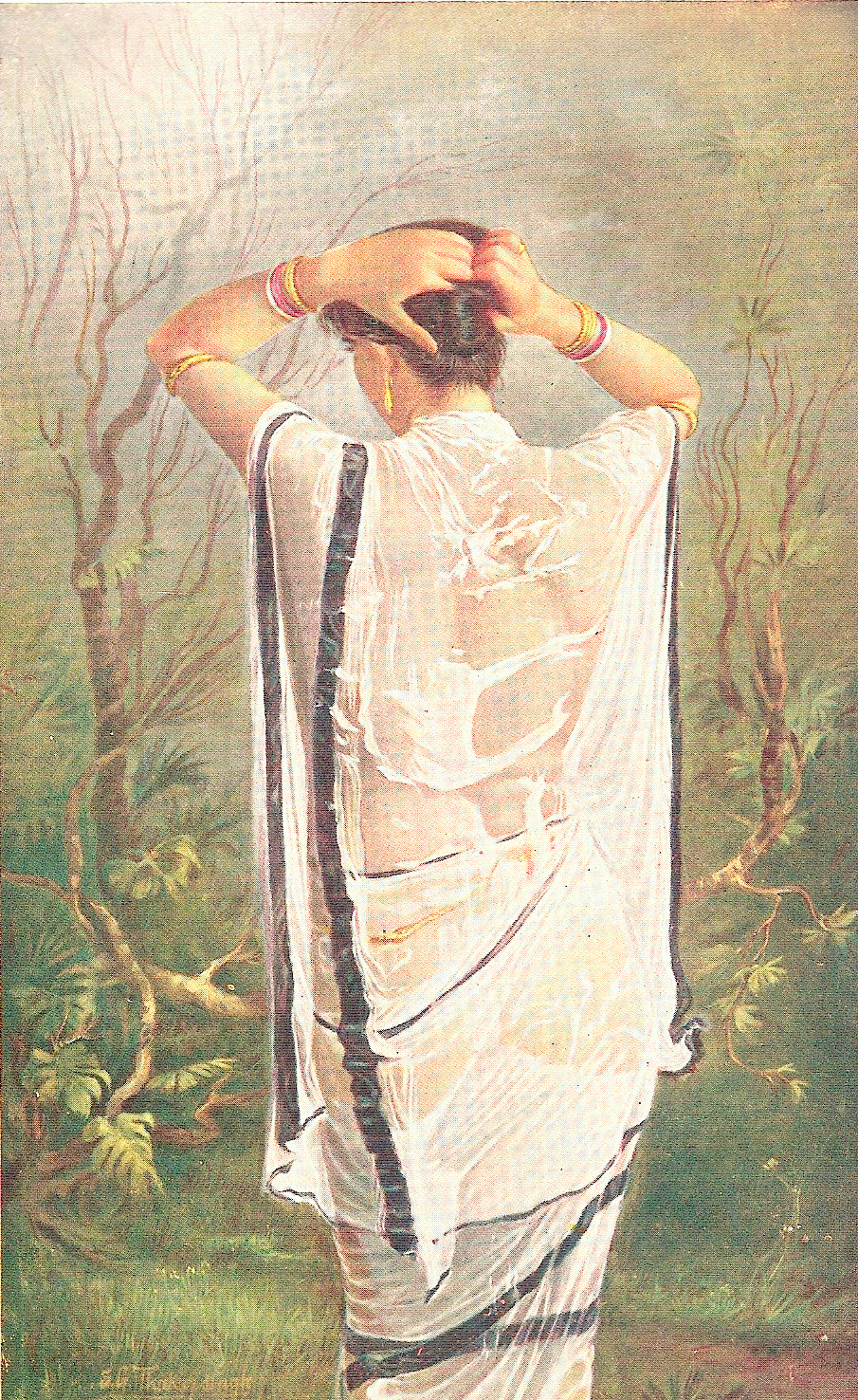
After the Bath, by S. G. Thakur Singh, 1924. Kept in the collection of the former Patiala royal state.

From Mumbai he moved to Kolkata where he lived and worked for several theatrical companies, working initially at Madan Theatre as a scene painter. The Tagores became his patrons, and the public too got to appreciate his work through reproductions in Bengali journals. His seductive paintings of women, such as After the Bath were especially popular. According to Partha Mitter, author of The triumph of modernism: India's artists and the avant-garde, 1922–1947 and the art critic Krishna Chaitanya, Thakur Singh followed the style of the Bengali artist Hemendranath Mazumdar in painting such themes.

With friends, Thakur Singh organised the Punjab Fine Art Society in Kolkata, and the Society's first Exhibition was held in 1926. The Society promoted Thakur Singh's own works, publishing his paintings in The Art of S. G. Thakur Singh and Glimpses of India, the latter book had introductions by Rabindranath and Abanindranath Tagore. Thakur Singh worked specially for the rulers of Indian princely states on commissions, the rulers of Kotah, Udaipur, Bhopal, Kashmir and others being his patrons.

Thakur Singh moved back to Amritsar in 1931, where he founded the Thakur Singh School of Art. Several of its past students are now achieving recognition as artists or as art-teachers and it has been lately recognised by the Industrial Training Department of the Punjab Government to award a diploma of Art & Craft, teacher's course.

He painted in oils, pastels and water colour. He painted nearly ten thousand paintings, and has won many awards. His paintings hang in museums, public buildings and in private collections around the world.

India honoured him in other ways too. He was nominated to the First Punjab Legislative Council in 1952. He was on the Executive Board of the National Academy of Art (Lalit Kala Akademy) and was Chairman of the Decoration Sub Committee at the 61st Session of the Indian National Congress held at Amritsar in 1956. He was invited to the former USSR and Hungary for solo shows in Moscow, Leningrad and Budapest.

He was commissioned to do many portraits, but it is his landscapes which have won for him popular acclaim.

He received award of Padma Shri in 1973.

== Auction Results ==
S G Thakur Singh's works in auction world is rare. Most of it is found in museums and hotels which were palaces at one time.
Auction House	Result Link
Bonhams	https://www.bonhams.com/auction/26636/lot/194/s-g-thakur-singh-india-189099-1976-indian-street-scene/
Sothebys	https://www.sothebys.com/en/buy/auction/2021/modern-contemporary-south-asian-art/untitled-woman-in-courtyard
Bid and Hammer	https://auctions.bidandhammer.com/sg-thakur-singh?productId=2717&catId=58#.YwOwsXbMKUk
Bonhams	https://www.bonhams.com/auctions/25434/lot/216/
Bonhams	https://www.bonhams.com/auction/25545/lot/86/s-g-thakur-singh-india-189099-1976-fishermen-at-dawn-on-madras-beach/
Bonhams	https://www.bonhams.com/auction/27372/lot/104/rajasthan-bedla-prince-of-bedla-by-sg-thakar-singh-1935/
Osians	http://assets.osianama.com/ecatalogue/2008-01-19-Indian-Modern-Contemporary-Art/35/
