= Sajitha R. Shankar =

Indian painter

Sajitha R Shankar (Sajitha Gouwry)
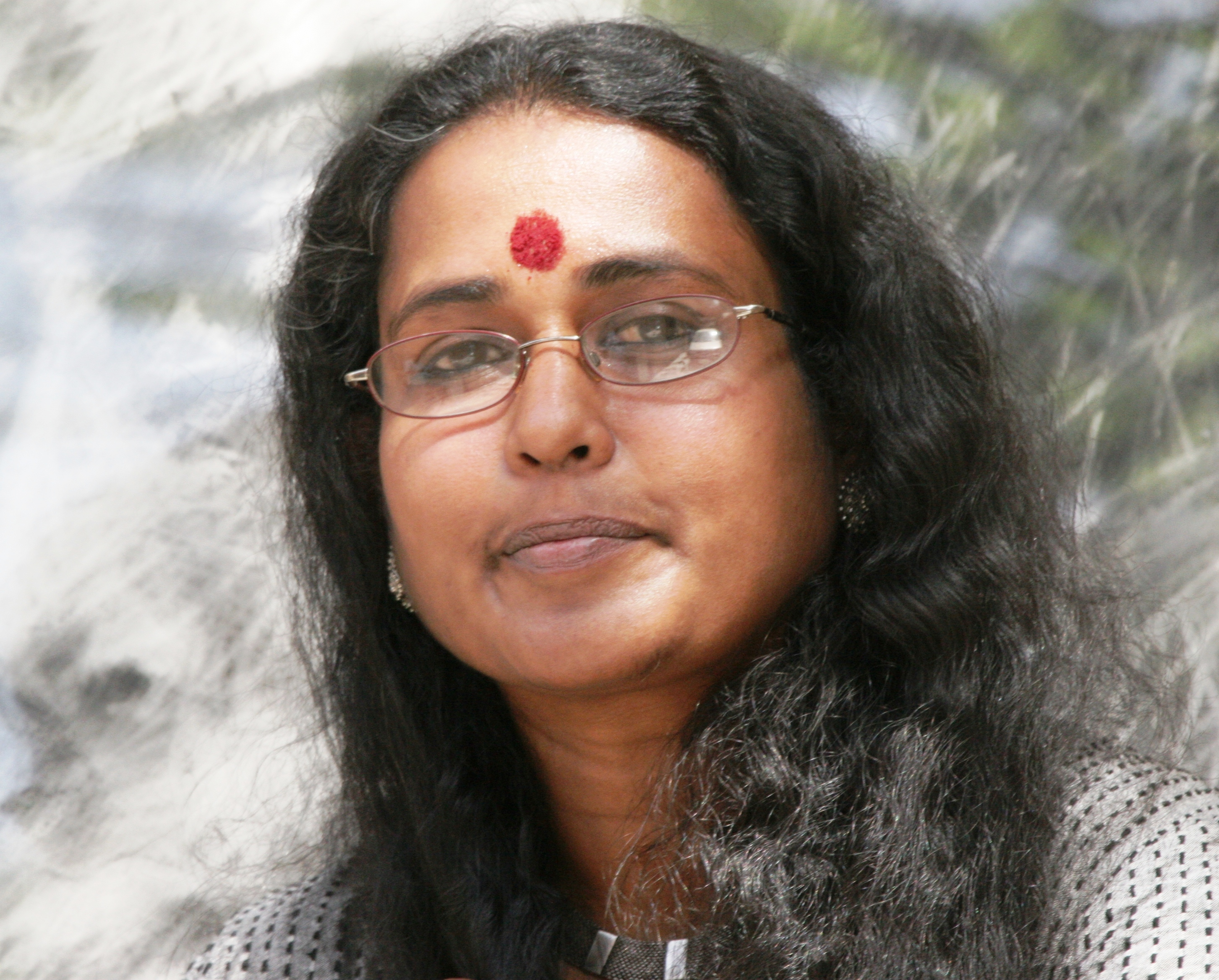
- Shankar in 2011
- Born: Sajitha R Shankar (Sajitha Gouwry); 9 December 1967; Kumaranalloor, Kottayam, Kerala
- Children: Shilpy R Shankar
- Parent(s): P.K. Karunan (late) & C.N. Gowry(late)
- Relatives: Marcus Joseph Dushiyanthan (son-in-law), Zahra Dushiyanthan (Grand Daughter), Sunil Kumar Puthen Parambil Karunan (Brother)
- Awards: Pollock-Krasner Foundation Grant 2017 Charles Wallace Fellowship, Senior Fellowship, Ministry of Culture, India
- Website: sajithashankar.com

Sajitha R. Shankhar (Sajitha Gouwry) (Sajita Āj̳a Śaŋkaj̳a; born 9 December 1967) is an internationally acclaimed contemporary artist from India. Her paintings are featured in numerous public and private collections, including the National Gallery of Modern Art, Bangalore; the National Gallery of Modern Art; the Indira Gandhi National Centre for the Arts; Lalit Kala Akademi, New Delhim; and the Middlesbrough Institute of Modern Art. Her preferred medium is charcoal and acrylic on paper. Her most recent installation is titled Tantric Yoni, a painting made out of turmeric, vermilion powder, rice powder, and burnt husk of paddy. The painting was created for the 2013 One Billion Rising campaign in Kochi.

== Life ==
Sajitha.r.Shankhar was born in 1967 at Kumaranalloor, Kottayam, Kerala. After successfully completing a BFA degree from the Government College of Art & Craft, Thiruvananthapuram, she worked for three years at the Regional Centre Studios of the Lalit Kala Akademi Chennai. Later, from 1989-2004, she lived and worked at Cholamandal Artists' Village. During this period, she traveled to the major art centers in the world, attended workshops, did collaborative work with other artists and writers abroad, and hosted several major art galleries across Asia and Europe. Her first solo exhibition was in 1987, at the age of 20. Sajitha has a daughter named Shilpy R. Shankar.

== As an artist ==
Sajitha was a member of the Lalit Kala Akademi, Kerala, from 2002-2011. She also served as a Governing body member of Vyloppilli Samnkruti Bhavan, Trivandrum, Kerala from 2006-2011. In 2007, she founded the Gowry Art Institute on the banks of the Vamanapuram river in Kallar, with the goal of promoting the work of female artists, as well as to provide an inclusive space for promoting various cultural activities.

== Career ==
Sajitha R. Shankhar has held 22 solo and 50 group art shows of her works in a wide variety of cities in India, as well as others across Europe.

She has also taken part in countless workshops and art camps, as well as organizing many of her own.
