= Sanjay Khatri =

Indian ballet dancer

Sanjay Khatri (born 1987 in New Delhi) is an Indian ballet dancer, recognized as the country's first male ballet dancer to perform internationally.

== Early life ==
Khatri was born in New Delhi in 1987, near the Delhi-Haryana border in India.

At age 19, Khatri enrolled in dance classes at Delhi's National Ballet & Academy Trust of India (NBATI), as the only male dancer. He began teaching ballet to children at the American Embassy School in Delhi and received a scholarship to attend a workshop in Buenos Aires, Argentina. Additionally, he earned scholarships at the Seoul Tanz Station in Seoul, South Korea.

== Career ==
Khatri's career in ballet includes performances with ballet companies such as the Universal Ballet Company and the American Ballet Theatre. In addition to his performances, Khatri has established two ballet schools: the Nijinsky Ballet School in New Delhi and the Central Contemporary Ballet in Mumbai. Khatri has also garnered recognition as the first Indian male ballet dancer and, at the time of publication, India's only male ballet dancer in publications such as Elle, DNA Mumbai, The Times of India, Punjab Kesari, and The Caravan.
