= Ravi Mandlik =

Indian artist

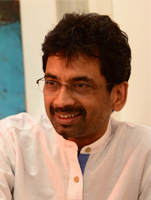
- Born: 20 October 1960 (age 65); Achalpur, Maharashtra, India
- Education: Sir J. J. School of Art
- Known for: Abstract painting
- Movement: Abstract Expressionism

Ravi Mandlik रवि मंडलिक (born 1960, Achalpur, Maharashtra, India) is an Indian artist. He completed his G.D. Art in painting from Sir J. J. School of Art, Mumbai. He was a member of the teaching faculty of L.S. Raheja School of Art, Mumbai and Sir J. J. School of Art, Mumbai, Maharashtra, India.

== Exhibitions ==
- 1999: W/N Millennium Show at London, Brussels, Stockholm, and New York
- 1995: Yokohama Citizens Gallery, Japan
- 2007: The Ueno Royal Museum Tokyo
- 2007: Power of Peace, Bali, organized by Tao art gallery
- 2007: International show organized by Articulate, New York
- 2006: The Indiart Show
- 2002: The Chapel Gallery, Singapore: Maratha Kaleidoscope, Al Diyafa Center, Satwa, Dubai

== Awards ==
- 1999: the Winsor & Newton worldwide millennium painting competition
- 1995-96: the Bendre-Hussain Scholarship awarded from BAS Mumbai
- 1992 : the International awarded of Seychelles Visual Art Biennale from the Seychelles
- 1985 : Govt.award from the Art Society of India
- 1985 : Usha Deshmukh Gold-Medal from Sir J.J. School of Art
- 1984 : Fellowship from Sir J. J. School of Art

== Gallery ==
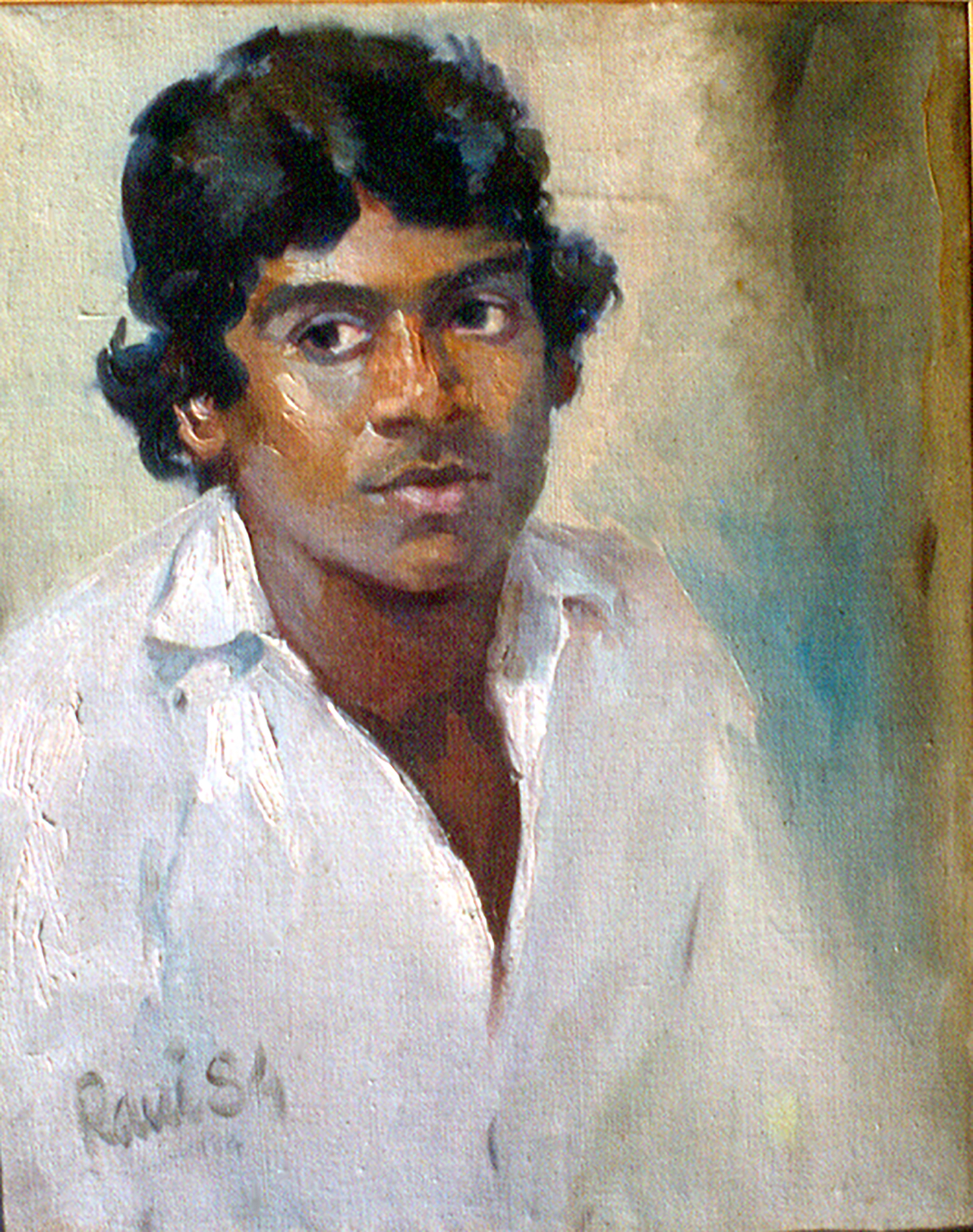
Ravi Mandlik Titled : Portrait by ravi mandlik

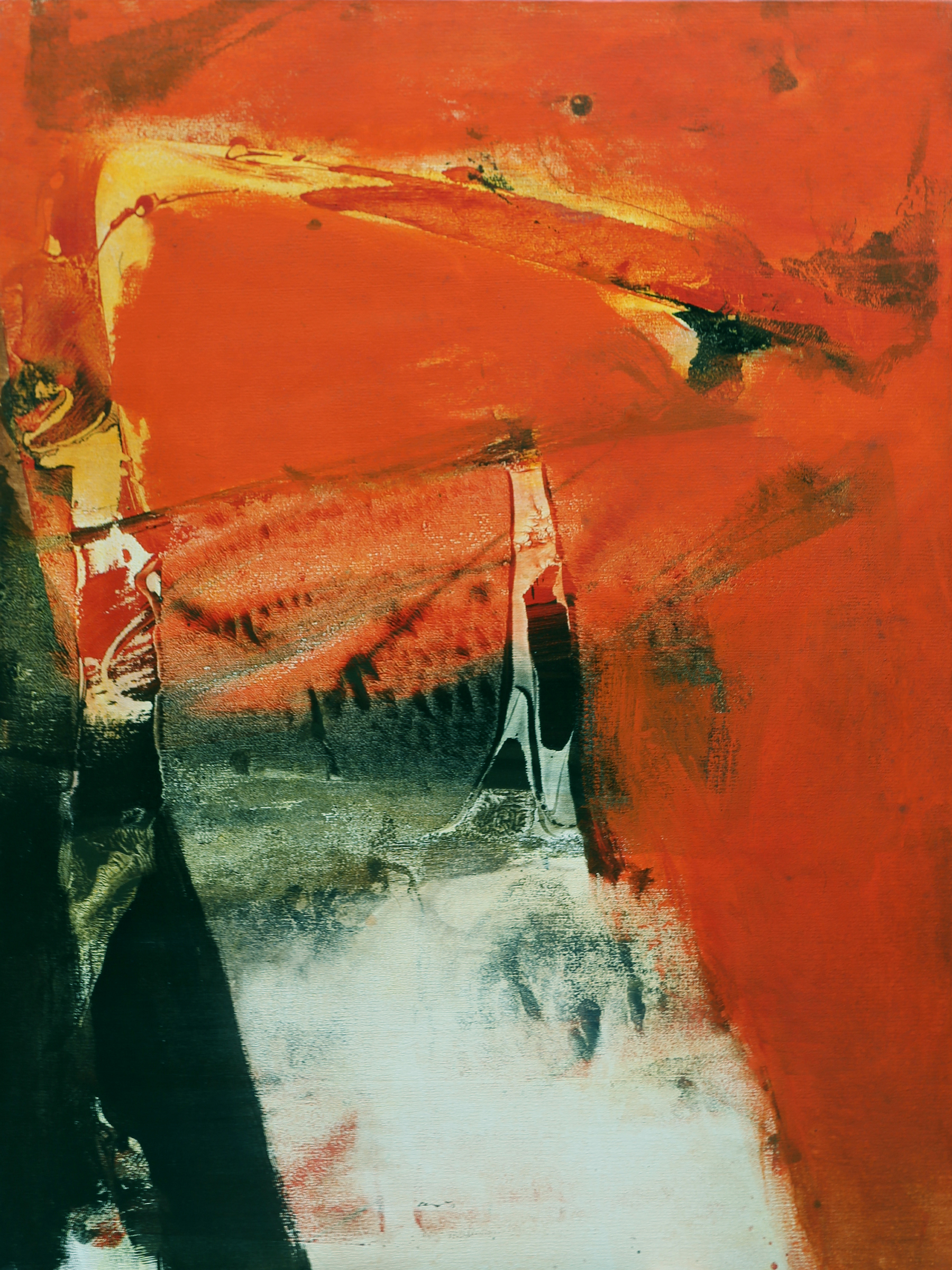
Ravi Mandlik 2013 Titled : Untitled Medium : Acrylic on Canvas Size : 40"x30"inc

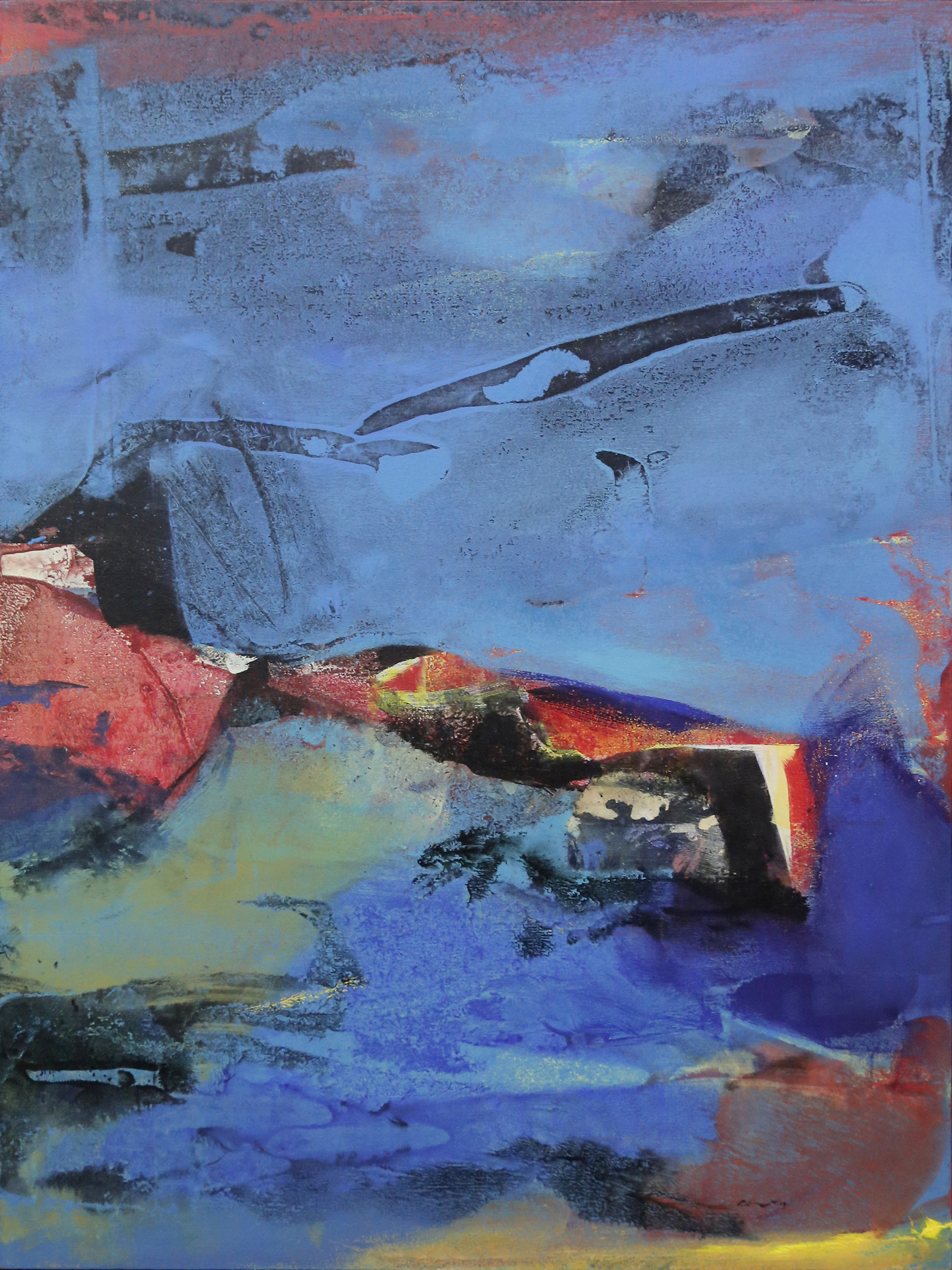
Ravi Mandlik 2014 Titled : Untitled Medium : Acrylic on Canvas Size : 40"x30"inc

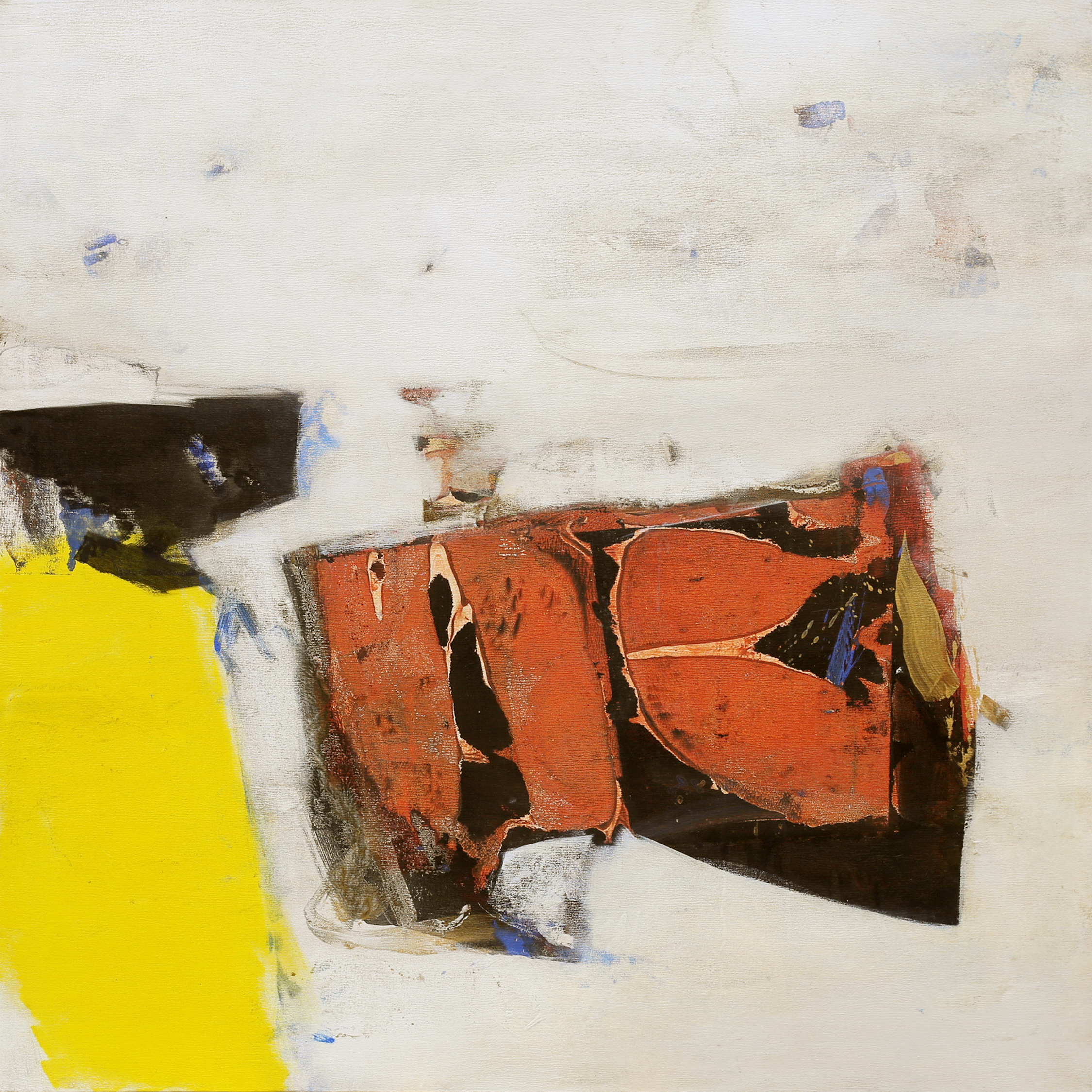
Ravi Mandlik 2013 Titled : Untitled Medium : Acrylic on Canvas Size : 60" x 60"inc

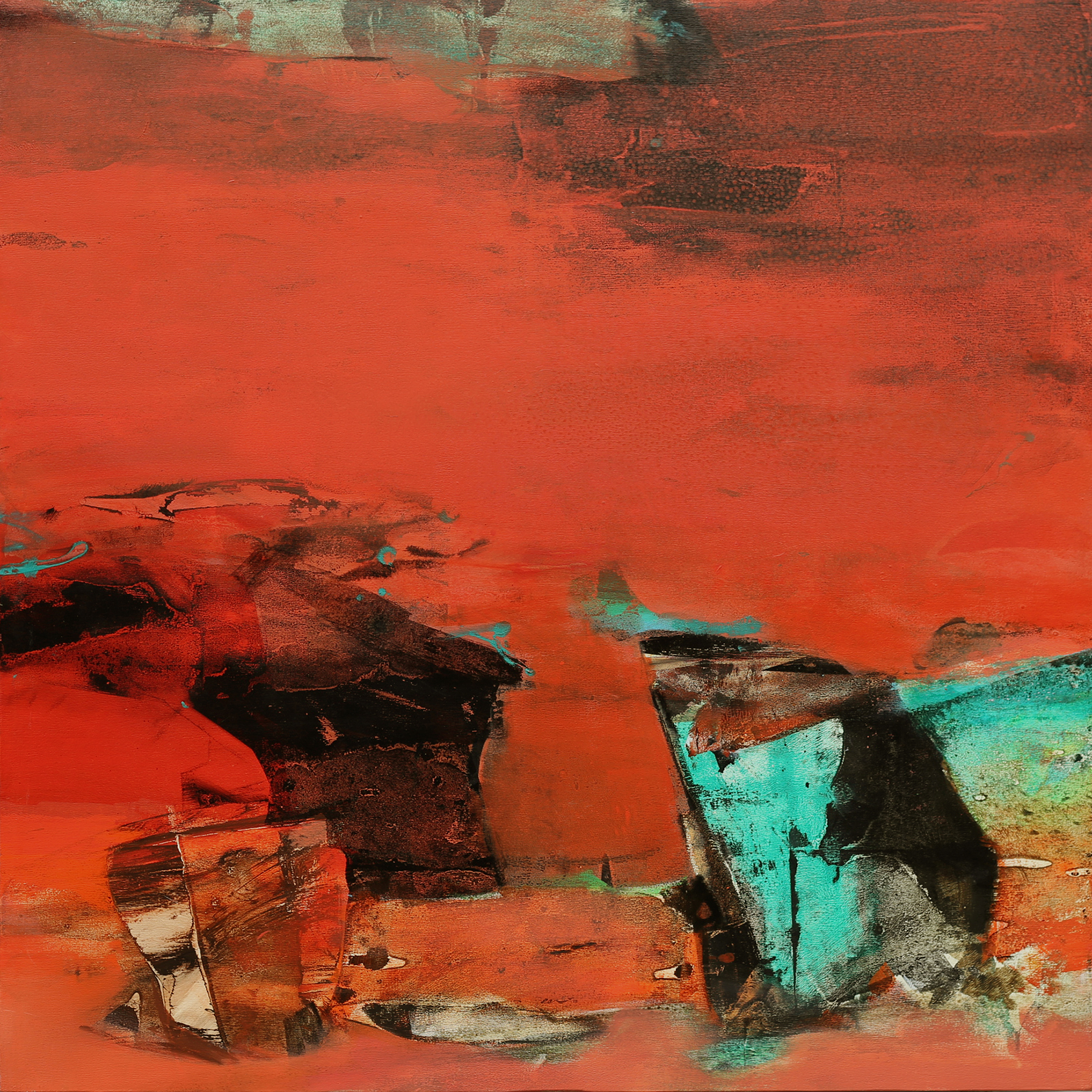
Ravi Mandlik 2013 Titled : Untitled Medium : Acrylic on Canvas Size : 60"x60"inc

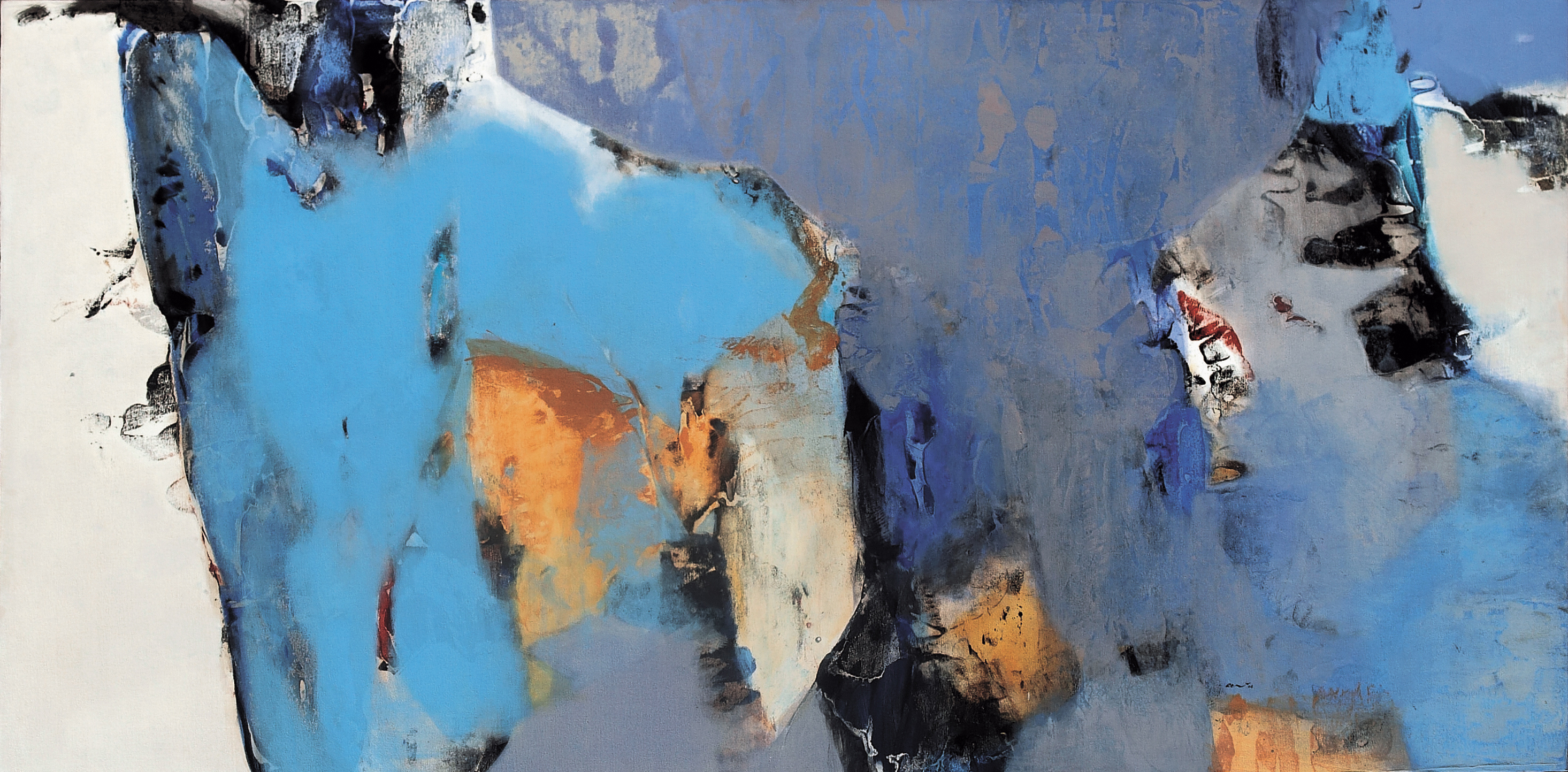
Ravi Mandlik 2006 Titled : Untitled Medium : Acrylic on Canvas Size : 60"x120"inc

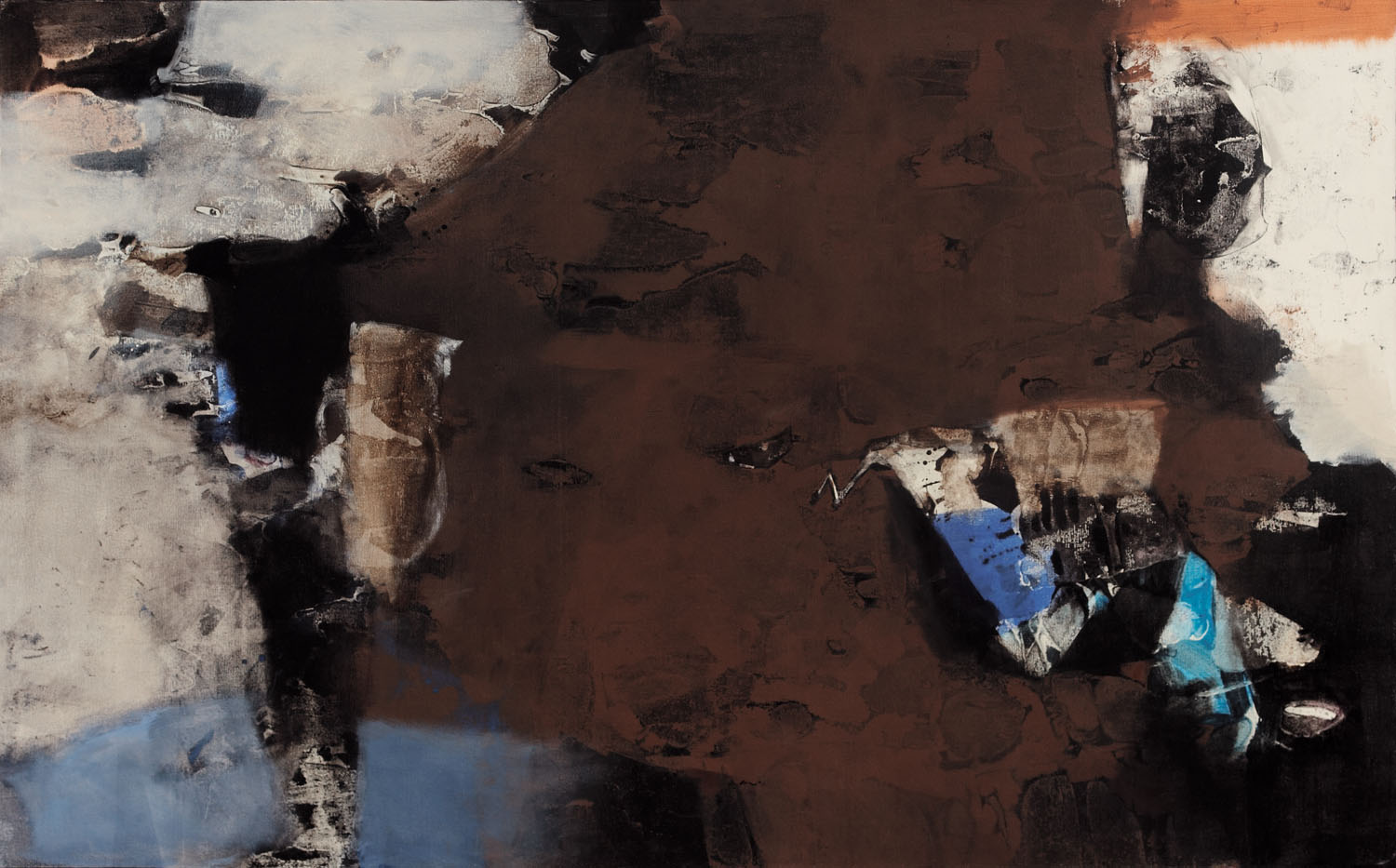
Ravi Mandlik 2013 Titled : Untitled Medium : Acrylic on Canvas Size : 60"x96"inc

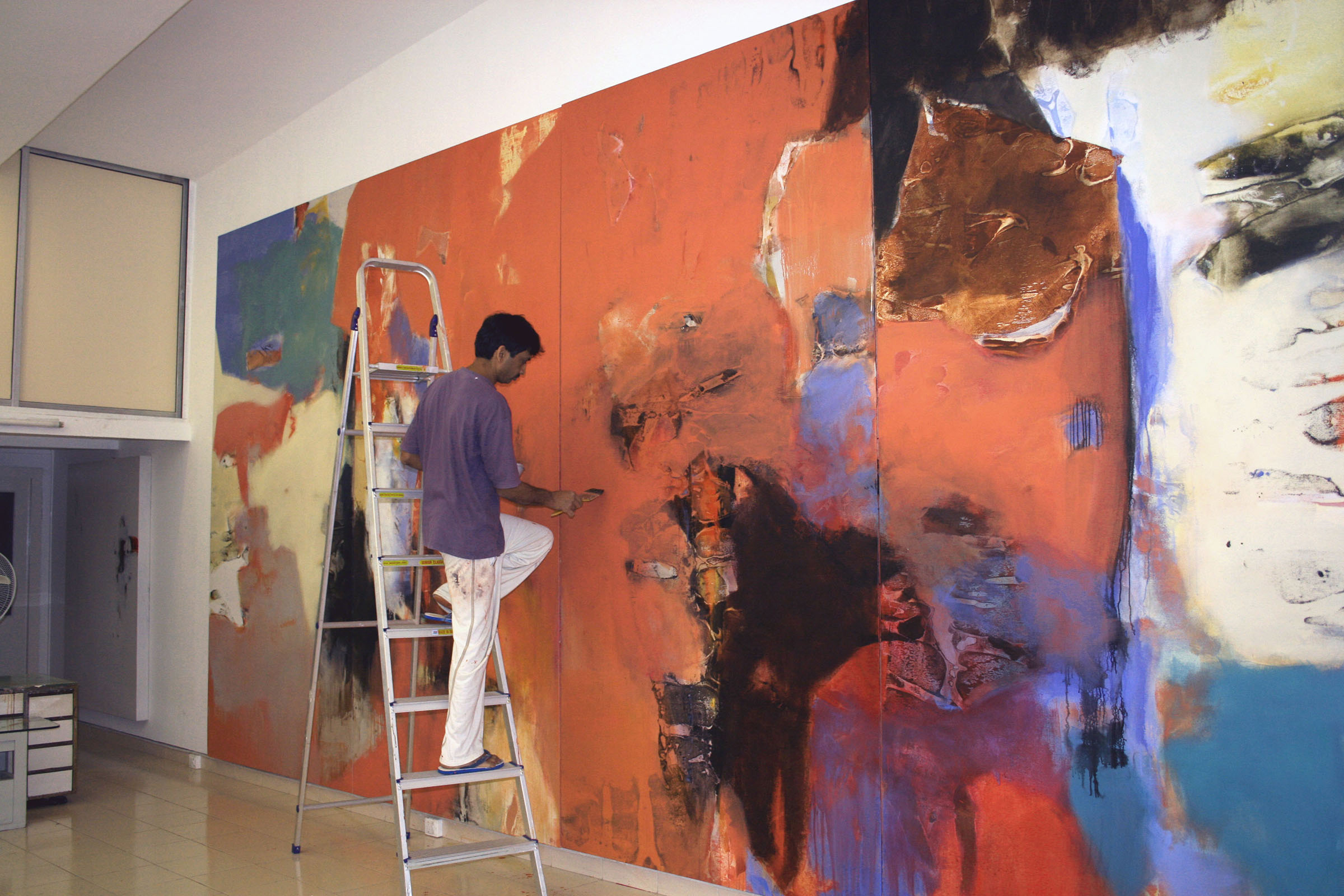
Ravi Mandlik At work in studio

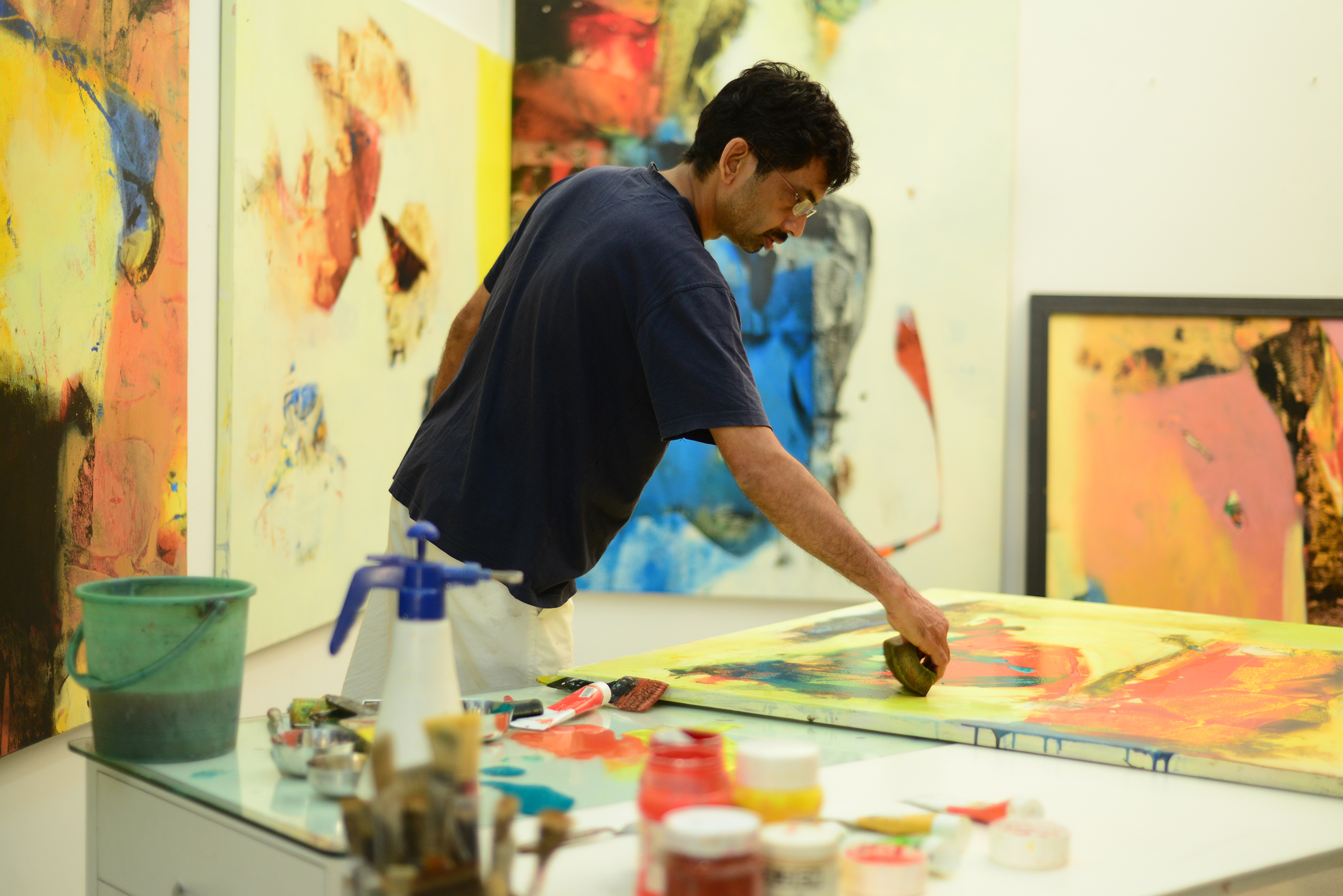
Ravi Mandlik At work in studio
