= Bhavna Mehta =

Indian-American visual artist (b. 1968)

Bhavna Mehta (born 1968) is an Indian-American visual artist specializing in cut paper and embroidery. She has exhibited widely throughout Southern California and lives and works in San Diego, CA.

== Early life ==
Mehta was born in Ahmednagar, India. At age seven she contracted polio, which forced her into a wheelchair. She completed a B.A. in physics from Ahmednagar College in 1987 and a M.S. in electronic science at University of Poona in 1989.

At age 22, Mehta immigrated to the United States. In 1993, she earned a second master's degree, in computer science, from California State University, Northridge. She began working as a software engineer for Nokia in San Diego. She married George Cunningham, another software engineer, in 2000. Laid off in 2006, she was soon hired by Motorola, but was laid off again in 2008.

Having achieved a degree of financial security, she decided in 2008 to try a career as an artist. After exploring various media, she enrolled in a paper-cutting workshop led by paper artist Béatrice Coron at the Penland School of Crafts in North Carolina.

== Solo exhibitions ==
- 2013 A Paper Garden, Noel-Baza Fine Art, San Diego, CA
- 2015 Gush, Oceanside Museum of Art, Oceanside, CA
- 2017 Once Upon a Body, Art Produce, San Diego, CA
- 2018 Leela - Portrait of a Woman in a Green Dress, Timken Museum of Art, San Diego, CA

== Awards ==
- San Diego Art Prize, 2014
- Creative Catalyst Grant, San Diego Foundation, 2015
- Artists Activating Communities Grant, California Arts Council, 2016-2017
