= Y.G. Srimati =

Y.G. Srimati (1926 - 2007) was a musician, dancer and painter born in Mysore, India. From a very young age, she was trained in Indian classical music, dance and painting. Y.G. Srimati became a highly accomplished vocalist and performer of Carnatic music and became a participant of the Indian Independence Movement from Chennai. She was deeply influenced by Mahatma Gandhi and at rallies addressed by him she would perform devotional songs in various Indian languages. She dedicated her art work to nationalist themes, often painting figures from Hindu mythology, her style being influenced by Nandalal Bose of the Bengal School of Art and the frescoes of the Ellora and Ajanta Caves. Her talent was recognized in 1952 during her first solo exhibition at the Government Museum, Madras (now Chennai).

== Personal life ==
Born in 1926 in Mysore then in the Kingdom of Mysore. Srimati grew up in Madras (now Chennai) in a Tamil Brahmin family. Her older brother, Y.G. Doraisami, mentored her in classical dance, singing, instrumental music and painting. Her grandfather was the chief astrologer in the court of the Maharaja of Mysore. The family initials of 'Y.G.' was an honorific title granted by the Maharaja. Her grandfather died when her father was a year old and her family's land was seized. Her father was married off at the age of six and was disinherited. Following which he dedicated himself to the education of his children.

Srimati danced as a child and her first solo performance happened when she was seven. She started to paint when she was in her early teens. Her brother was an art collector and he sponsored various artists.

In 1963, she got a scholarship to the Art Students League of New York, where she met fellow artist, Michael Pellettieri. They later became partners and he even went to contribute some of the paintings made by her to Metropolitan Museum of Art after she died.

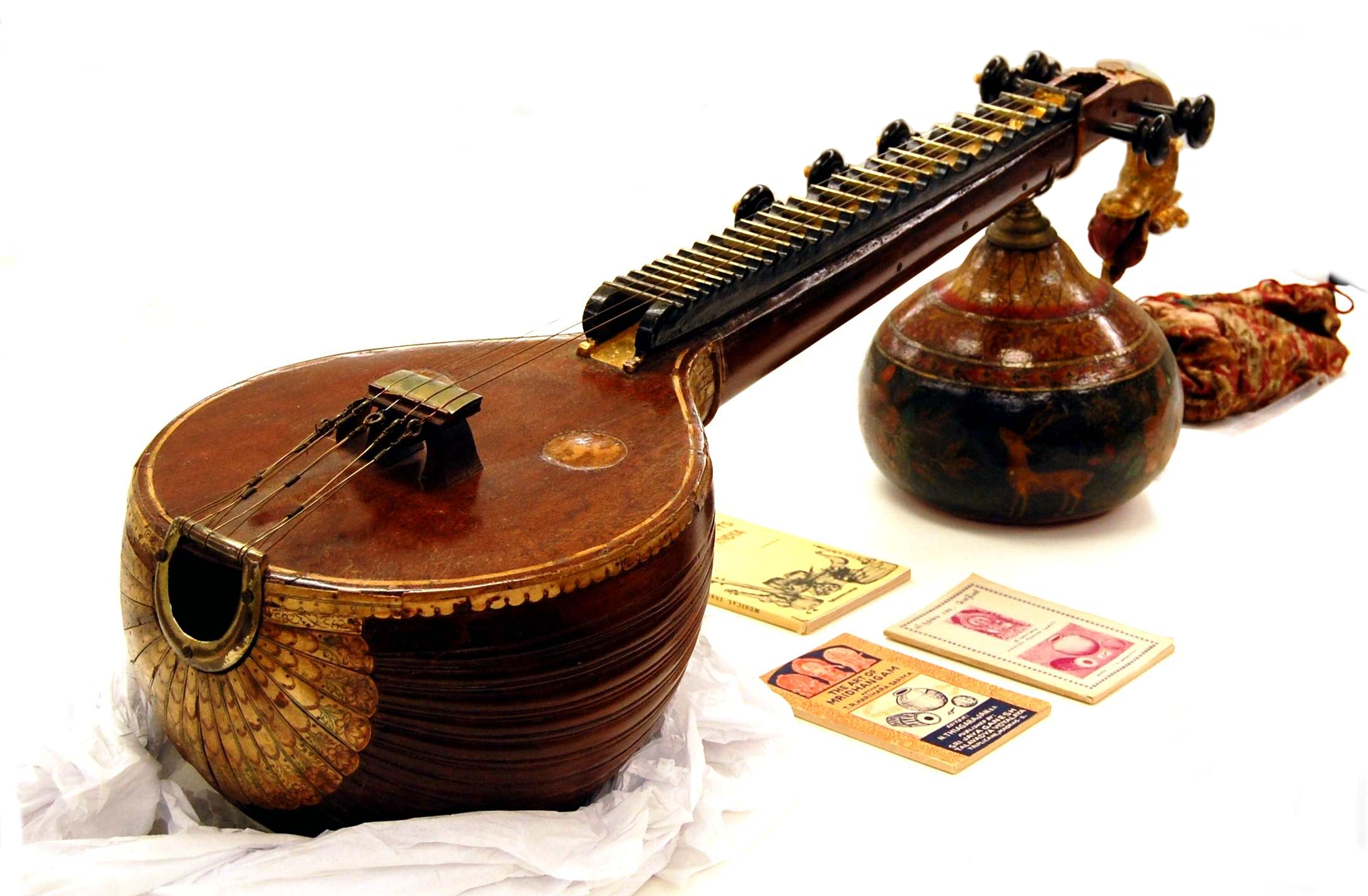
Vina (वीणा) MET midp2009.531 det7

== Career ==
Y.G Srimati’s career started when she received training in four traditional South Indian arts, voice, music, dance and painting. She became devoted towards these arts. She kept her lifelong friendship with Carnatic vocalist M.S. Subbulakshmi. During the Freedom Struggle, Y.G Srimati would often sing devotional songs at gatherings led by M.K Gandhi.

She got the opportunity to go on a tour in India, United States and in the United Kingdom with the classical dancer Ram Gopal.

== Influences and style ==
The theme of Y.G. Srimati's paintings is based on devotion. She did not date or sign her work.

Most of Srimati's work was inspired from mythology and religion. She pursued her musical career even after shifting to New York. And the exhibition also includes one of her Tamburas which was the vestige of her musical career.

Srimati was intrigued by Indian religious epic literature and visions of rural culture. She had this nationalist sentiment which was the subject matter of the conscious expression. The Met Collection featured 25 watercoloured paintings which expressed musical instruments, archival photographs and performance recordings.

The art critic Holland Cotter said :

"Ms. Srimati’s choreographic take on naturalism makes everyday subjects—a woman dressing, a family riding to market—look heroic, and images of deities and saints look approachable human. In the end, she’s a devotional artist, in the religious or spiritual sense: Her 1947-48 painting of the Hindu goddess Saraswati was originally displayed on her family’s home altar."

Being a trained classical dancer, a lot of her artwork was dedicated to the treatment of the physical form. Some of her more popular paintings comprise 'The Bullock Cart' and 'Parashurama'. She died in 2007 in her hometown Chennai, at the age of 81.

The first retrospective exhibition of her work An Artist of Her Time : Y.G. Srimati and the Indian Style opened at the Metropolitan Museum of Art in New York in 2016.

Her work was influenced by ragas, dance positions and mythological tales. When she was 26, she had her first exhibition, inaugurating the Centenary Hall Madras Museum in the year 1952.

=== Other exhibitions and work include ===
- In 1950, profiled in the first major survey publications of painters in the post-Independence India, Present Day Painters of India
- In 1952 The Government Museum, Madras, organized her first solo Exhibition.
- In 1955 All India Fine Arts and Crafts Society, New Delhi, Solo Exhibition.
- 1959 Beryl de Zoete invited her to England. Her time in England entailed concert performances, performances for BBC, teaching and exhibitions.
- 1960 New York publisher George Macy Companies offered her a commission to illustrate the Bhagavad Gita, upon completion of which, she was invited to New York.
- 1964-1969 she attended the Art Students League of New York after being provided with a Board of Control Scholarship to study printmaking.
- In 1961, her work for the deluxe edition of Bhagvad Gita were 15 commissioned paintings.
- 1960s to 1980, she supported herself through teaching, commissions and exhibitions. Her time in America was spent on telling stories about religion and culture in India through the means of watercolours as well as classical music and dance.
- 1967, she was commissioned by the Smithsonian Institution to create an etching for the Geneva Peace Conference. She was a participant of the Vietnam War protests.
