= B. Prabha =

Indian artist

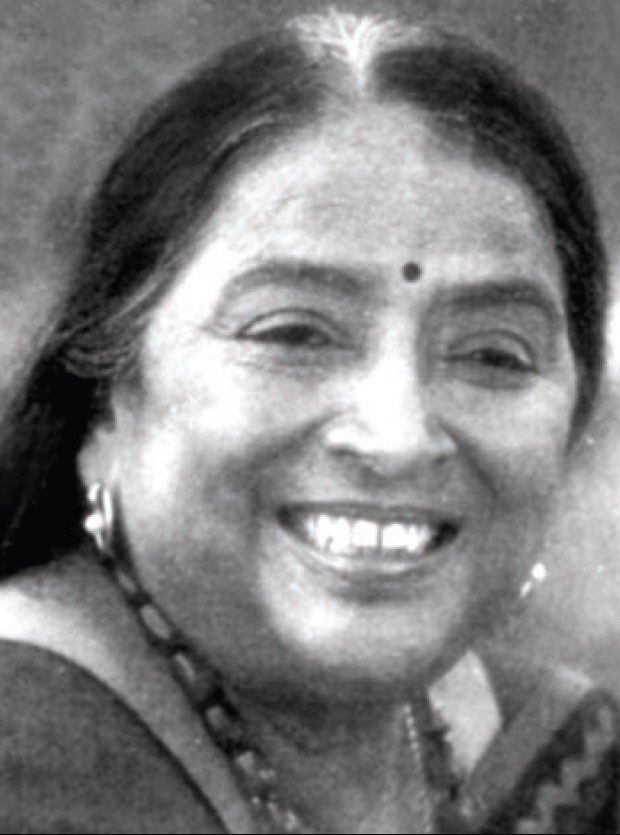
- Born: 1933; Maharashtra, India
- Died: 2001 (aged 67–68); Nagpur, India
- Known for: Painting
- Spouse: B. Vithal (m. 1956–1992)

B. Prabha (1933 – 2001) was a prolific Indian artist who worked primarily in oil on canvas. She is best known for her graceful, elongated figures of pensive rural women, each dominated by a single colour. By the time of her death, her work had been shown in over 50 exhibitions, and had found its way into significant art collections, including India's National Gallery of Modern Art, the TIFR Art Collection and the Air India Art Collection.

Prabha started working at a time when India had few women artists. She was deeply inspired by the work of seminal modernist Amrita Sher-Gil. Much like Sher-Gil, the protagonists of Prabha's works were usually women. She was moved by the plight of rural women, and over time, they became the main theme of her work. In an interview with Youngbuzz India, she said "I have yet to see one happy woman." Her paintings also covered a wide range of subjects from landscapes to social issues like droughts, hunger and homelessness.

== Early life and education ==
Prabha Agge grew up in the small village of Bela, near Nagpur in Maharashtra, India. In her formative years, Prabha was equally interested in music and art. Advised by her elder brother against pursuing two vocations at once, she chose art after completing her schooling. An early inspiration was the pioneering Indian-Hungarian modern artist, Amrita Sher-Gil. Like Sher-Gil, Prabha dreamed of being a renowned artist, taking her paintings to all corners of the world. She studied at the Nagpur School of Art, before moving to Bombay on a scholarship, completing her Diploma in Painting and Mural Painting at the Sir J. J. School of Art in the year 1954-55. It was here that she met her husband, the artist and sculptor, B. Vithal, whom she married in 1956. Badwelgar or B. Prabha thus acquired a new signature. In Bombay, the artist couple struggled to make their way, selling pieces of family jewellery and sometimes depending on the assistance of friends for a place to stay and store their works.

== Career ==
At her first exhibition, held when she was still a student at art school, 3 of Prabha's paintings were acquired by Homi J. Bhabha, eminent nuclear scientist and patron of the arts, for the iconic art collection of the Tata Institute of Fundamental Research. Prabha's signature formal style evolved after her marriage to B. Vithal, when she moved from a modern abstraction to more decorative figuration. The artist couple held their first joint exhibition in 1956, the year they were married.

Prabha's graceful, elongated figures of rural women spotlighted their lives, labour, and the very real contemporary threat of drought, hunger and homelessness. It is significant to note that Prabha, a female artist practicing in an age where women were unapologetically oppressed, used her position and voice as an artist to comment on the same. While her work today might seem like a simple documentation of the figures of rural women, a few decades ago the works were rebellious, and conscious remarks on spirit and the plight of these women. As she famously said, "It is my aim to paint the trauma and tragedy of women."

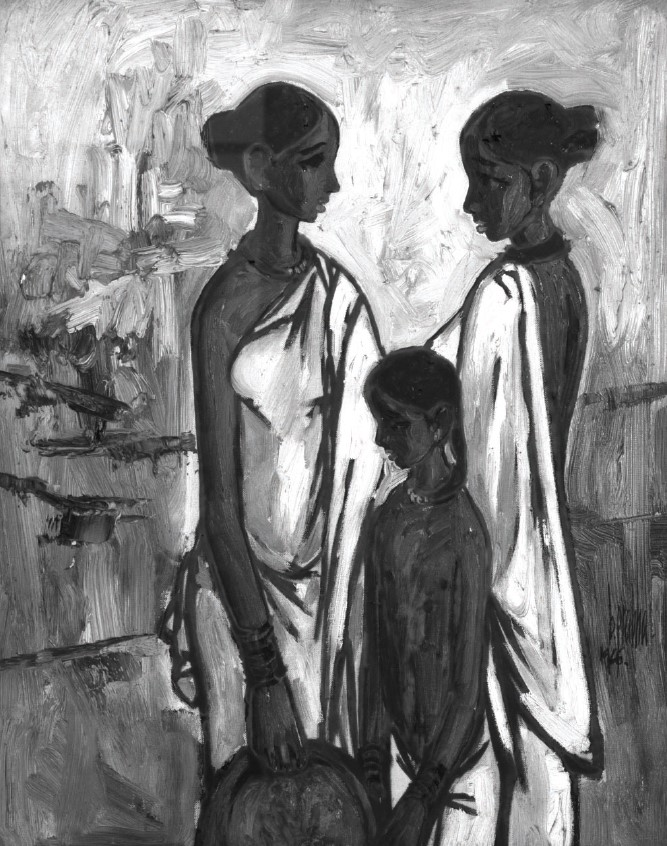
Gossip, Oil on Canvas / B.Prabha / 1970

=== Collections & Commissions ===
==== Air India art collection ====
Air India bought its first set of six paintings for Rs 87.50 in 1956 from B Prabha, then still a young art graduate. Prabha walked into Air India's art department and asked if the company would buy some of her paintings of Indian women. The officials agreed and a new art collection was born. The "Maharajah Collection" as it came to called, expanded to 4000 works over the next six decades and more, becoming one of India's most important art collections. The collection, which started with Prabha, aimed to put a little bit of India, both past and modern present, into the booking offices and spaces of the airline worldwide. Air India also commissioned her a wall mural for the waiting room of their Bangkok booking office.

==== Indian Embassy Tokyo ====
B.Prabha was also commissioned a mural by the Indian Embassy in Tokyo.

==== Tata Institute of Fundamental Research ====
In 1962-63, B. Prabha was part of a small group of acclaimed young artists invited to participate in a competition process to create the single most significant work commissioned by the TIFR - an over 13 foot mural to be executed in the building's central foyer. Whilst the commission was eventually awarded to the artist M.F. Husain, B. Prabha's proposed painting (Black Moon, 1963) in maquette form, continues to be on display nearby.

==== Citi India Corporate Collection ====
At least four of Prabha's works are also part of the Citi India Corporate Collection.

=== Exhibitions ===
Over the years Prabha held more than 50 exhibitions in India and abroad. She held two solo shows at Delhi's Kumar Gallery in 1959 and 1961. Her solo exhibition 'Shradhanjali' in Mumbai in 1993 was dedicated to her late husband B.Vithal. Prabha's work was also part of the group exhibition 'Contemporary Indian Painters' at Jehangir Art Gallery in Mumbai in 1996. She was also a part of the Bombay State Art Exhibition in 1958 where she was awarded the first prize.

Posthumously, Prabha's work has been included in exhibitions such as 'Winter Moderns' at Aicon Gallery, New York, and 'Pot Pourri' at Gallery Beyond, Mumbai, both in 2008.

=== Awards and honors ===
- Awarded the First Prize at the Bombay State Art Exhibition in 1958
- Received All India Fine Arts and Crafts Society (AIFACS) Awards, New Delhi
