= Badri Narayan =

Indian artist (1929–2013)

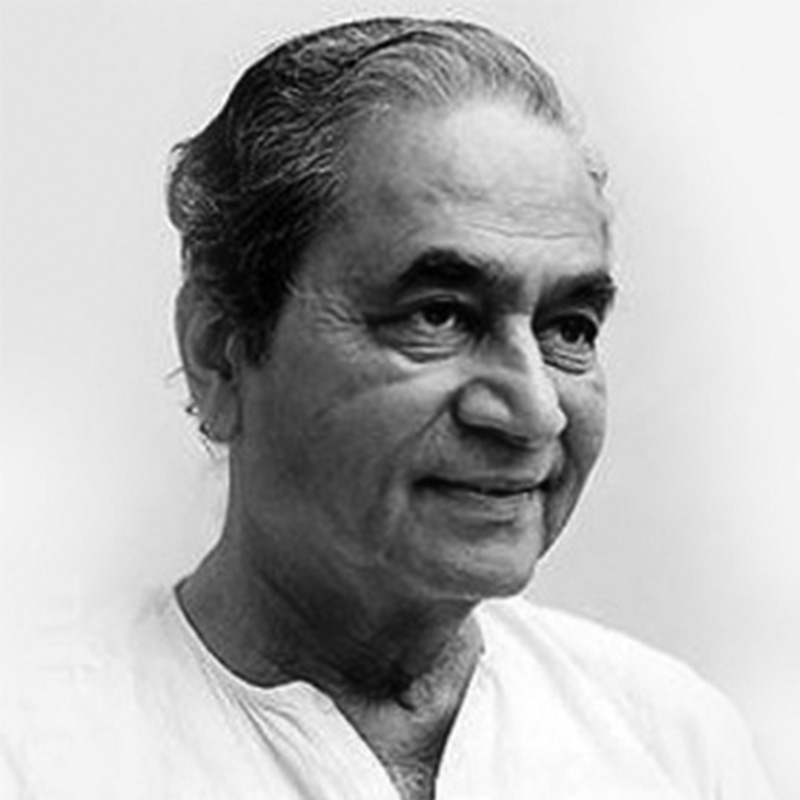
- Born: 22 July 1929; Secunderabad, Andhra Pradesh
- Died: 23 September 2013 (aged 84); Bangalore, Karnataka

Badri Narayan (22 July 1929 – 23 September 2013) was an Indian artist, illustrator, author and story-teller.

== Biography ==
Badri Narayan was born on 22 July 1929 in Secunderabad (now in Telangana). A self-taught artist with no formal training, he began his career in the late 1940s working with ceramic tiles and mosaics, before moving to ink, pastel, and watercolour as his primary mediums. His first public showing was in 1949, followed by a solo show in 1954.

Over a career spanning several decades, Narayan was part of over fifty national and international shows. His works are included in several permanent public collections, such as the National Gallery of Modern Art and National Museum in New Delhi, as well as the Philadelphia Museum of Art's South Asian Collection.

Aside from painting, he was a prolific writer of short stories, verse, and children's tales on subjects such as art, folklore, and mythology, and illustrated numerous books. He was also the subject of a documentary by Mumbai All India Radio.

Narayan died on 23 September 2013 due to frail health, at a hospital in Bangalore.

== Artistic style ==
Narayan’s distinctive pictorial vocabulary drew inspiration from medieval woodcuts, Byzantine portraiture, Ajanta murals, and Pahari miniatures. Working between the literary and visual mediums, his paintings are intimate and narrative-driven, incorporating elements of fantasy and Indic folklore. His simple outlines and two-dimensional stylised representations are featured in notable painting series such as Savitri, Chandi Thakur and the Rani, Six-Tusked Elephant, and Boat.

== Awards and honors ==
- Padma Shri (1987)
- Maharashtra Gourav Puruskar (1990)

== Work ==
=== As Illustrator ===
- The Mahabharata by Shanta Rameshwar Rao; illustrations by Badri Narayan. (1985, Orient Longman)
- The Ramayana by Laxmi Lal, illustrated by Badri Narayan (1988, Orient Longman)
