= Bholekar Srihari =

Srihari Bholekar
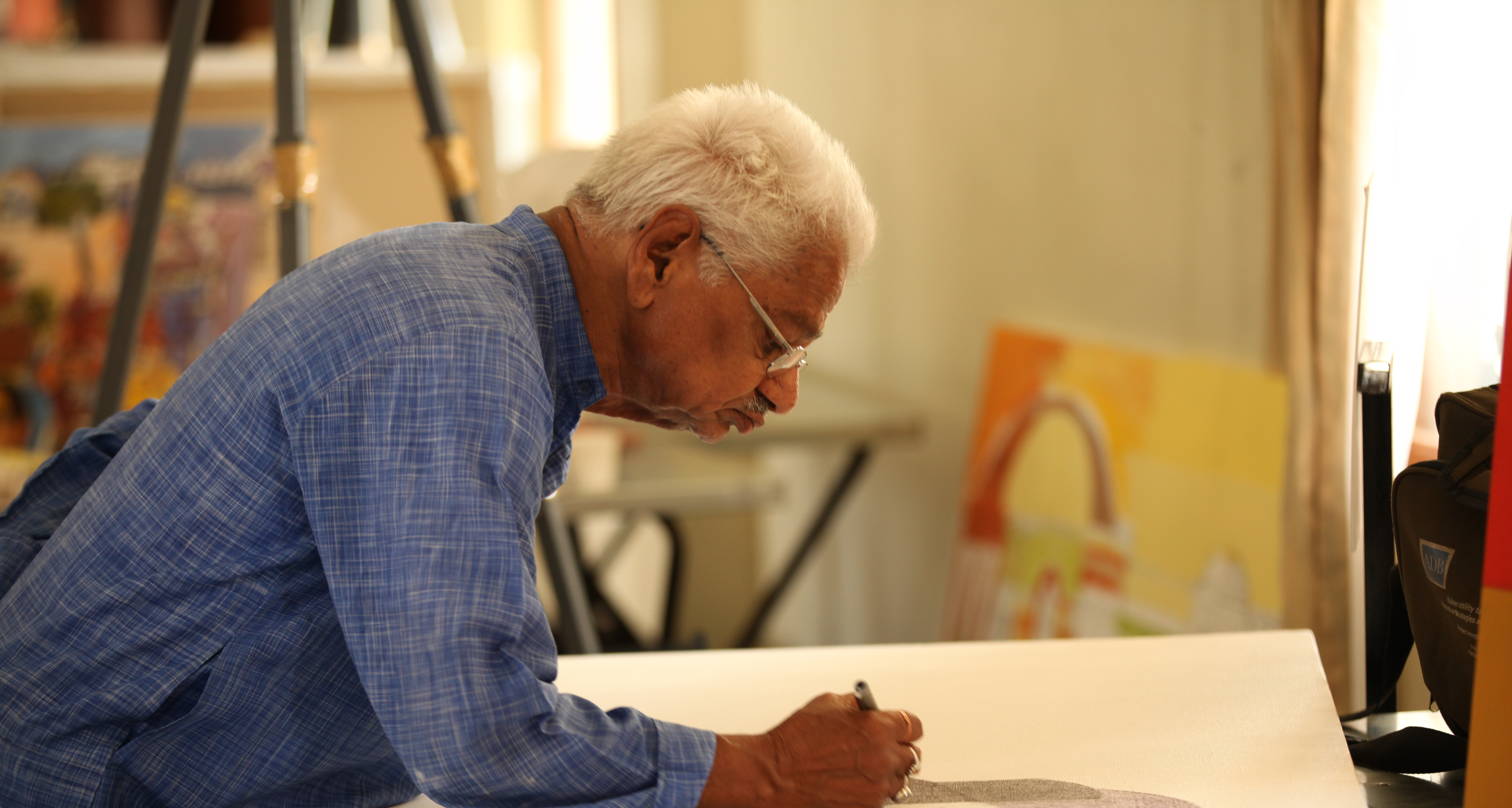
- Srihari Bholekar in 2014
- Born: Srihari Bollakpalli; 1 January 1941; Bollakpalli, Banswada, Telangana, India
- Died: 23 August 2018 (aged 77); Hyderabad, India
- Known for: Painting, sculpture, print-making, murals
- Movement: 1969
- Spouse: Laxmi Bholekar
- Awards: National Award (Lalit Kala Akademi Award)

Ъ Srihari Bholekar (1 January 1941 – 23 August 2018) was a painter, sculptor and printmaker from Telangana, India.

== Early life ==
Bholekar was born in Bollakpalli. He obtained his diploma in drawing and painting from the Sir J.J. School of Art, Mumbai, completed Diploma in Painting in 1961 and since then continued painting, winning several awards, participating several state and national exhibitions, and organising art activities. He was also a graduate from Osmania University.

He participated in several group and one-man shows in Portugal, Italy, Macedonia, Poland, Germany, New Delhi, Chandigarh, Kolkata, Mumbai, Bangalore Chennai, Bhopal, Ahmedabad, Lucknow, Amritsar, Raipur, Baroda and took part in Art Conference National Academy of Fine Arts, International Arts Conference Lalit Kala Academy 3rd Triennale, New Delhi World Telugu Conference and Artiste Conference A.P. State Lalit Kala Academy Hyderabad.

Bholekar came from a small village called Bollakpalli, on the banks of river Manjeera which is 5 kilometers away from Banswada in the Kamareddy district of Telangana State in India. He belonged to the Patlolla family where he was also known as Patlolla Srihari. He got his name Bholekar when it was recorded by Marathi-based institutions where he initially studied. This is due to the practice of the people of Maharashtra of adding the '-Kar' suffix to one's village/community and keeping it as a surname.

As he was born and brought up in Telangana in India he set his paintings of rural life in a modern style. Most of his subjects portray the life of Telangana and its culture, customs, traditions, difficulties, plights, misfortunes and predicaments.

The Art of Bholekar brings the significant emotional, cultural and cognitive evaluations of nature of life.'

Bholekar died on August 23, 2018.

== Career and style ==
He worked as the Chief Artist at Indian Air Force at Begumpet and in 1996 he was honoured with Commendation by A.O.C – in – C.H.Q.T.C Indian Air Force,

Bholekar described his early life, which consisted of living in a small village, as having a strong impact on his later works: “Till 10 years I enjoyed the village life. Art has not developed because of it but its influence is still there. The energy, the process and boldness in my works comes from village atmosphere. I had come through so many situations in early life; not hardships, but I enjoyed my life as a child. My parents did not allow me to go and play in the jungle”.

In 1963, at only 21 years old, Bholekar held Salar Jung Museum's first one-man show, which specialized in mural paintings. The village Bholekar grew up in served as the primary theme of these murals, and art critics began to notice the artist.

Latern on, Bholekar worked in the art industry for 18 years, taking positions such as chief artist of the Begumpet airport, before walking away from it. He told reporters of The Hindu that “I stopped everything and wanted to be a simple man without any artistic attachments ... I have a strong will power. I stopped drinking and smoking at the age of 35 because of willpower. I am born with art instinct and returned to printmaking”.

Bholekar's art encompasses many different media. After making a mark in print media, he gravitated to ink drawings. “Here artists do not interact much with artists of other countries. Their works are simple as they do not experiment. Their subject is same and as a result, they get stagnated. I don’t want to be like that”, “My drawings will continue for some time and then I will shift to another media.”

Commenting on his own style, Bholekar said, “One can enjoy the design sense and interpret the work in one’s own way. My abstract drawing is like music. One need not know the intricacies of laya and raga but its rhythm is appreciated. Likewise, art lovers can enjoy the rhythmic lines and its composition and it is aesthetic too”.

== Awards ==
- 2004 National Award - Govt. of India - Lalit Kala Akademi
- 2005-07 Senior Fellowship Visual Art Graphics, Government of India, Ministry of Culture, New Delhi
- 2003 Honoured as one of the Veteran Artist of India, New Delhi
- 1996 Honoured with Commendation by A.O.C - in – C.H.Q.T.C Indian Air Force
- 1988 Gold Medal All India Exhibition, Maha Koshal Kala Parishath, Raipur
- 1988 Honoured as Eminent Artist by Maharastra Mandal (A.P), Hyderabad
- 1977 Gold Medal All India Exhibition Hyderabad Art Society

== Exhibitions ==
Solo Exhibitions

2000 An Exhibition at Jehangir Art Gallery, Mumbai.

1977 The Graphics Prints Exhibition Organised by Alliance Franchise, Bangalore

1973 Mural Paintings at Kala Bhavan, Hyderabad

1968 Exhibition of Paintings at Kala Bhavan, Hyderabad

1966 Hyderabad Art Society

1965 Ravindra Bharathi

1964 Ajantha Pavilion Public Gardens, Hyderabad

Group Exhibitions

1966, 69, 78, 85, 86 and 2004 National Exhibition of Art, Lalitha Academy (Painting, Sculpture & Graphics), New Delhi

1974, 76, 85, 2004 Academy of Fine Arts, Kolkata

1985 Arts Society of India, Mumbai

Karnataka Chitrakala Parishad, Bangalore

Bombay Art Society, Mumbai
