= Latika Katt =

Indian sculptor (1948–2025)

- Born: 20 February 1948; United Provinces, India
- Died: 25 January 2025 (aged 76); Jaipur, Rajasthan, India
- Education: The Doon School; Banaras Hindu University; Baroda College of Art; Slade School of Fine Art
- Known for: Sculpture
- Spouse: Balbir Singh Katt
- Awards: Lalit Kala Academy Award; Beijing Art Biennale Award

Latika Katt (20 February 1948 – 25 January 2025) was an Indian sculptor who specialized in stone carving, metal casting and bronze sculpting. She won the Beijing Art Biennale Award for her bronze work titled "Makar Sankranti at Dashawmeth Ghat, Varanasi.

== Life and career ==
Latika Katt graduated from The Doon School, an all-boys school in Dehradun. She admitted that being in the minority as a girl in an all-boys school gave her confidence and courage in her later years. She started attending the Baroda College of Art to pursue Bachelor of Fine Arts, Maharaja Sayajirao University of Baroda where she graduated with First Class honours in 1971. She was awarded a scholarship to research at the Slade School of Art, London University, London in 1981.

She first got great recognition in the 1970s for a body of experimental work made from cow dung as she did not have funds for anything else. Her talent was spotted by the politician and Prime Minister Indira Gandhi during an art exhibition, who later encouraged her to take sculpting as a profession. She was a great admirer of Auguste Rodin and used naturalism as her leitmotif. Her interest and association with nature was kindled by her father, a botanist. She taught at Jamia Millia Islamia and Banaras Hindu University for many years starting in 1981 and was the Head of Department of Fine Arts at Jamia Millia Islamia. Claiming to sculpt real people, most of her subjects are her relatives, friends and students.

Katt lived and worked in Delhi and Banaras. She was married to sculptor Balbir Singh Katt, who went missing in 2000. She died on 25 January 2025, at the age of 76.

== Exhibitions ==
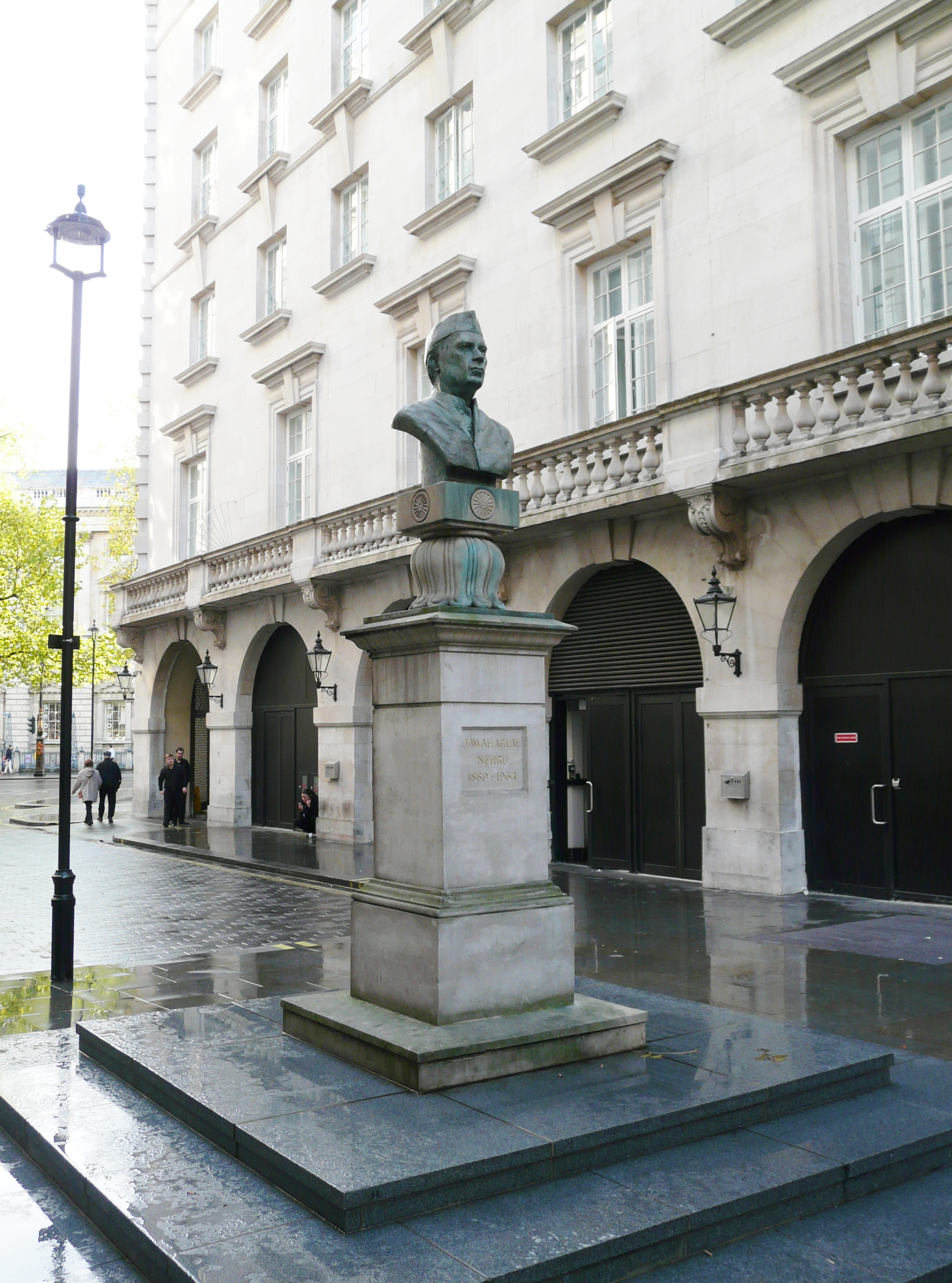
Bust of Jawaharlal Nehru (1991) by Latika Katt, India Place, London WC2. Plinth by Peter Leach Associates.

Some art exhibitions showcasing her works:

- Paris Biennale, Museum of Modern Art, Paris.
- ‘STREE’ Show at Moscow, Leningrad & Tashkent.
- The Self and The World: An Exhibition of Indian Women Artists at the National Gallery of Modern Art (NGMA) in Delhi.
- Chemould Art Gallery and Woodstock Art Gallery, London.
- Molten Landscapes at Cymroza Art Gallery, Mumbai.
- Group Show at Gallerie Alternatives, Gurgaon.
- “Heads”, Sakshi Gallery, Mumbai.
- Ways of Seeing: Women Artists | Women as Muse, DAG, New Delhi, 2021

Solos: Art Heritage, MMB & Kala Mela Lawns in New Delhi, Calcutta Art Gallery Kolkata, Sculptures, Painting and Prints JAG CYAG

== Awards ==
- Gujarat State Lalit Kala Academy, Ahmedabad, 1973.
- All India Fine Arts and Crafts, 1974.
- Society, New Delhi, 1975 and 1976.
- Academy of Fine Arts, Calcutta, 1974.
- Honoured as one of the Five Distinguished Women of Baroda, 1975.
- International Women's Show at Artists Centre, Bombay, 1975.
- A.P. Council of Artists, Hyderabad, 1976.
- National Award, Lalit Kala Academy, New Delhi, 1980.

== Scholarships ==
- National Cultural Scholarships MSU, UGC New Delhi.
- International: British Council Scholarship Slade School of Art, London.

== Sources ==
- Sheth, Pretima. Dictionary of Indian Art & Artist. Mapin publishing.
