= Gargi Raina =

Indian painter

Gargi Raina is an Indian painter who lives and works in Vadodara, Gujarat.

== Early life ==
Gargi's family is originally from Kashmir and later settled in Lahore and then during Partition of India, they moved to Delhi. She was born in New Delhi in 1961 and received a Bachelor of Fine Arts (BFA) degree from The College of Arts, New Delhi in 1985. She further went on to get a Master of Fine Arts (MFA) in Painting from the Faculty of Fine Arts, Maharaja Sayajirao University of Baroda in 1988.

== Career ==
Gargi was awarded the 2002 Residency at Taipei Artists Village in Taiwan. She has also participated in Lo Real Maravilloso: Marvelous Reality, 20 Year Celebration of Gallery Espace at Lalit Kala Akademi, New Delhi, 2009.

She uses gouache and dry pastels on paper and wood, and works in sequences which follow a narrative, linear in the way it reads but elastic in the way that it enables the user to comprehend and examine the artwork.

She says, "I've been working with the idea of stretching time. It's like seeing something in slow motion or looking at one thing and stretching that time, being able to go backwards and forwards and doing it at a very, very slow pace. I think that has been very crucial to a lot of the work that I have been doing recently."

She has conducted several workshops in Gorlesborg, Sweden, the Max Mueller Bhawan in Chennai, the Khoj International Artists Workshop in Modinagar and Srinagar, South Asian Women's Peace Workshop in Lahore, Pakistan organised by Salima Hashmi and workshop at Zenana Mahal in Udaipur Palace in Rajasthan.

She works and lives in Vadodara, Gujarat.

== Exhibitions ==
=== Solo exhibitions ===
1. Constructing the Memory of a Room, Paintings and Installations from 2001–07, Bodhi Art, New Delhi, 2007; Sakshi Gallery, Mumbai, 1999 and 1996; Faculty of Fine Arts, Maharaja Sayajirao University of Baroda, 1996; Gallery 7, Mumbai, 1992.

=== Group exhibitions ===
1. Snow, The Palette Art Gallery, New Delhi, in collaboration with Tao Art Gallery, Mumbai, 2010
2. Zip Files, Tao Art Gallery, Mumbai, 2009
3. Relative Visa, Bodhi Space, Mumbai, 2009
4. Material/Im-mmaterial, Gallery Collection, Bodhi Art, Gurgaon, 2008
5. Mapping Memories–2, Painted Travelogues of Bali and Burma, Gallery Threshold, New Delhi, 2008
6. Angkor: The Silent Centuries, Gallery Threshold, New Delhi, 2005
