= Gogi Saroj Pal =

Indian artist (1945–2024)

- Born: 3 October 1945; Neoli, Hardoi district, United Provinces, British India
- Died: 27 January 2024 (aged 78); Delhi, India
- Known for: Painting
- Spouse: Ved Nayar

Gogi Saroj Pal (3 October 1945 – 27 January 2024) was an Indian artist. She worked in multiple media, including gouache, oil, ceramic and weaving. Her works usually had women as their subject, and many of her paintings had a fantastical element that commented on the female condition. Her early works were more realistic, but over time she moved to simpler, more stylized paintings that had considerable impact.

Pal had a diploma in painting from the Government College of Arts and Crafts, Lucknow, Uttar Pradesh, India. Over the years she has had nearly 30 solo shows and won numerous awards, including the National Award from the Lalit Kala Akademi in 1990. She also participated in a large number of group shows both in India and overseas: Yugoslavia, Germany, France, Cuba and Japan among others.

== Education ==
Pal graduated from the College of Art in Banasthali, Rajasthan, in 1961 after which she obtained a Diploma in Painting from the Government College of Arts and Crafts in Lucknow in 1962–1967. She also pursued a Postgraduate Diploma in painting from the College of Art in Delhi in 1968.

Pal realised early in life that she wanted to become an artist. As her uncle was a famous writer, she had been exposed to the literary world and the arts. Her family was skeptical about her becoming an artist as there were very few artists during that time, and almost no female artists. She knew that to become an artist, she would have to enroll in an art school.

== Career ==
Gogi Saroj Pal first entered the art world as a graphic artist in 1965, when she had the chance to exhibit some thirty works at the Lucknow Information Centre. Around this time, she worked with mediums such as linos, monoprints, lithographs and especially woodcut intaglio due to the shortage of zinc (and hence, the privation of zinc plate) after the Indo-Chinese war. Between 1965–68, her works were shown in a series of shows at the Lalit Kala Akademi, which is also when she made her debut in oil painting. In terms of evolution of style, figurative forms seem to have become important as she composed these figures on the canvas. According to Uma Nair, it was at the Delhi Shilpi Chakra exhibition, in 1968, "that her figuration verged on a more solid and lucid framework."

She began teaching in 1970 as a lecturer at the Women's Polytechnic in New Delhi. She eventually returned to her postgraduate alma mater, College of Art, New Delhi, where she taught for a year in 1975–1976. She also lectured at the art Department of Jamia Millia Islamia University, New Delhi, in 1979–1980 and 1982–1983.

== Personal life ==
Pal married a fellow artist and friend, Ved Nayar, who is a sculptor. In Delhi, she worked as a freelance artist and also taught at art institutions. She suffered from various forms of illnesses, including getting her hip joint replaced. The replacement left her incapacitated as the muscles couldn't cope with the replacement for a long time, leaving her in excruciating pain. In an interview she said that it was her art which helped her get through the pain during that difficult time.

Pal died on 27 January 2024, at the age of 78.

== Commentary on her style ==
According to the authors in the book 'Gogi Saroj Pal: the feminine unbound', Gogi's women appeared to be feminine, sensuous, coquettish but they could equally be bovine, obdurate and slovenly. There was an element of dressing up but not with ornamentation or apparel. The nudity of her feminine figures, 'Nayikas', was fiercely commented on and debated over—was it part of the country's spiritual tradition or was she continuing to be the quintessential rebel? Gogi herself gave no explanations as the work speaks for itself. She was most interested in exploring how myth influences and reflects society.

Art critic Richard Bartholomew would see in them 'lonely people'. In 1990, in an art catalogue, Art writer Shamim Hanfi described her work as having a 'quiet restlessness' that creates 'a feeling of unexpressed sadness'.

In the initial stages of her experimentation with her work and her early works in lithography in 1979, Bartholomew would sense the solitariness of her 'faces, portraits, images, children with legs crossed, arms folded, recumbent figures, groups of people staring quietly, privately, personally into some past or future'.

Of specific interest are 'the suggestive eyes and delicate mouth, the posture, the placement of the hand, the unselfconscious attitude—'all create a sense of intimacy', a trait that would mark her entire career as an artist.

Her work suggested two things to Bartholomew, firstly, that 'humanity is life in Gogi's work; and life is an assortment of human beings, and life is thought', which was prescient of the manner in which she would continue to develop, and second, that hers is a 'poignant world of real people but the reality of the world and of the personae has been made an abstract principle'.

== Artworks ==
=== Being Women ===
According to Seema Bawa :

Gogi Saroj Pal’s Being a Woman series focus on her concern of the place women have in society. In this evocative painting, the women has been rendered in a likeness of Christ’s crucifixion, but without a cross. The outstretched hands, the slight slumping of the head and the way in which the legs seem pinned together are reminiscent of Christ’s torment. ‘There is so much celebration of pain, we are reminded of how much he suffered on our account.’ the artist said, ‘but what of the anguish of women.’ Gogi Saroj Pal finds it ironic that people shed tears on Christ’s suffering, but are unmoved by our overlooking of sorrows of the women in their own surroundings- whether mother, sister, wife, partner, friend or daughter. This painted sisterhood of grief gives this work a powerful poignancy.

=== Tribute to Dr. Rahat Indori ===
Gogi Saroj Pal was one of the 9 select artists who paid their tribute to Dr. Rahat Indori by creating painting inspired by his Ghazals. Gogi Saraoj Pal created painting on the famous ghazal – Jitne Apne The, Sab Paray The. The Ghazal was composed by Aashran Mahajan as part of tribute. Dr. Rahat Indori – Ek Alag Pehchaen – A Tribute by Indie Musicians & Artists.

== Awards and honours ==
- 1978, 1979, 1981 – Group 8 Medals at All India Graphic Prints Exhibition, Chandigarh and New Delhi
- 1980 – Sanskriti Award, New Delhi
- 1981–1982 – Fellowship of Lalit Kala Akademi, Garhi Artists' Studios, New Delhi
- 1986–1988 – Fellowship, Department of Culture, New Delhi
- 1987 – Jury's commendation. certificate in the First International Biennial of Plastic Arts, Algeria
- 1990 – National Award, Lalit Kala Akademi, New Delhi
- 1995 – 12th Cleveland International Drawing Biennial, Middlesbrough, U.K.
