= Piraji Sagara =

Indian painter and sculptor (1931–2014)

Piraji Sagara was an Indian painter and sculptor from Ahmedabad, Gujarat, India.

== Life ==
Piraji Sagara was born on 2 February 1931 in Ahmedabad. He matriculated in 1950. He had a natural talent for art so he joined a drawing course and later served as a drawing teacher. He completed Masters in Drawing in 1957 and in Arts in 1960 from Sir J. J. School of Art, Bombay. His brother Ishwar Sagara was also an artist who learned from him without art education.

He taught art at the School (now Faculty) of Architecture, CEPT University, Ahmedabad from 1963 to his retirement. He continued to work there until his death.

He died on 23 January 2014 in Ahmedabad.

== Works ==
He introduced wood collages. He used coloured board, tin plates, brass plates, nails in sculptures and paintings. He was also inspired by folk traditions of Gujarat. His works are exhibited around the world including São Paulo Biennale, Brazil in 1971; Art Now in India exhibition around Europe 1972–73; Exhibition of Asian Artists by Fukukoma Museum of Art, Tokyo 1979–80. He was invited to the 12th international festival of painters at Cagne Sur-Mer, France.

About the themes of his works, Subhash Shah wrote,

Curious relationship of man with nature, with birds and animals, inherent contradictions in human existence, chaos and turmoil of the worlds we live in and above all, the profound mystery of nature are some of the prime and direct concerns of Piraji's world of thought and imagery. All these themes are given persuasive forms in his work.

== Recognition ==
He received the medal of Kolkata Fine Arts Academy in 1960 and 1961. He was awarded the first prize of Gujarat State Lalit Kala Akademi in 1962. He received the award of Lalit Kala Akademi, New Delhi in 1963. The basement of Faculty of Architecture in the CEPT University was named after him later.
