= N.K.P. Muthukoya =

Indian painter of modern art

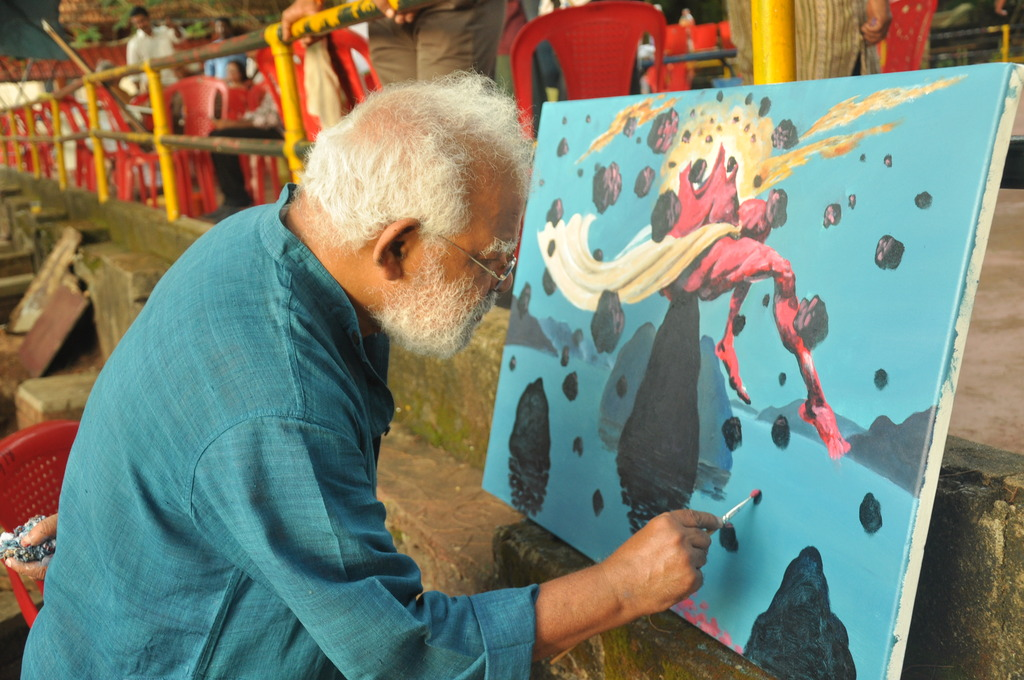
Artist N.K.P. Muthukoya

N.K.P. Muthukoya is an Indian painter of modern art, known for his surrealism paintings .

== Early life ==
He was born in 1941 in Andrott, Lakshadweep. In the 1940s, Muthukoya's family moved from Lakshadweep to Kannur. He studied in Elathur CMC High School. He completed his art studies at Madras School of Art under K. C. S. Paniker. In 1998, he joined the Directorate of Advertising and Visual Publicity as exhibition officer and then voluntarily retired as broadcasting officer.

== Awards and recognition ==
- Kerala Lalit kala Academi Fellowship in 2019.
- Padmini Award by Kerala Lalitha Kala Academy in 2011.
