= Somalal Shah =

Indian painter (1905–1994)

Somalal Shah (14 February 1905 – 1994) was an Indian painter and art teacher. Born in Kapadvanj and educated in Bombay and Calcutta, he spent three decades painting and teaching art in Bhavnagar in Saurashtra, Gujarat.

== Early life ==
Shah was born to a shopkeeper Chunilal and Jekorben on 14 February 1905 in Kapadvanj, Gujarat, India. He studied briefly at Gujarat College in Ahmedabad in 1925 and Kalavant Karkhana in Baroda. He joined Sir J. J. School of Art, Bombay in 1926 but left for Ahmedabad after a year. He studied under Pramod Chattopadyaya from 1926 to 1928. He further studied at Indian Society of Oriental Art, Calcutta established by Abanindranath Tagore where he studied under Kshitindranath Majumdar.

== Career ==
On Ravishankar Raval's advice, he joined Dakshinamurti, an educational institute established by Nanabhai Bhatt, as an arts teacher. Dakshinamurti published a portfolio of fifteen paintings titled Rang Rekha in 1934–35. In Bhavnagar State, the royal family of Bhavnagar became his patron. Dakshinamurti moved out of Bhavnagar in 1939. So Somalal taught briefly at Kumarshala and Gharshala until 1943. He joined Alfred High School in 1944 on request of the royals of Bhavnagar state. He taught arts there for two decades. He retired in 1960 and moved to Ahmedabad.

He died in 1994 in Ahmedabad.

== Style ==
He attempted to use European techniques on Indian subjects. He also worked in styles of Indian miniature paintings and the Bengal revivalist movement. He avoided heavy oil colour strokes and muted sepia tones. As he studied in Culcutta, he was greatly influenced by Nandalal Bose and Abanindranath Tagore. He used a wash technique which later became his signature style. He lived in Saurashtra region of Gujarat for almost three decades where his works depicted the culture and people of the region. He also illustrated the book on the birds of Kutch and Saurashtra. His paintings were natural and realistic with great attention to the details. He was a fond of wash technique of painting.

Jyoti Bhatt and Khodidas Parmar were his students.

== Awards ==
He was awarded the Ranjitram Suvarna Chandrak in 1949. In 1990, he received the Ravishankar Raval State Award for Arts by the Government of Gujarat. In 1988, Ahmedabad Municipal Corporation felicitated him. He was also the recipient of an award from the Gujarat Lalit Kala Akademi.
