= Anil Kumar Dutta =

Anil Kumar Dutta

Anil Kumar Dutta (born 1 Baisakh, 1340 Bangabda [15 April 1933] – 15 Bhadra 1412 [1 September 2006]) was an Indian artist, writer, and educator.

He was the founder-editor of Shilpa O Sahitya, a literary magazine and founder-principal of the Academy of Creative Art.

== Early life and education ==
Anil Kumar Dutta was born in Sahanagar district of south Kolkata to a family hailing from Barisal. He was 4th of 7 brothers born to Jnan Ranjan and Parul Bala Dutta. He lost both his parents within a span of six months when he was 7, his youngest brother was 3. He and his brothers were then raised by their grandmother.

From an early age, he was drawing, painting and writing poetry. He started publishing a handwritten literary magazine that was passed along in the neighbourhood. When in high school, he and his friends started a Baroari Durga Puja and he made the idols for the first Puja there. A special feature of this Puja was that the Pandal was a veritable wall magazine. This in time became the Tarun Sangha Puja of Sahanagar which continues to this day.

After completing the matriculation from Sahanagar High School, he entered Government Art College, Kolkata, but had to discontinue due to financial difficulties.

The following year, he enrolled at the Calcutta Art School (later to be known as Calcutta Art College) and graduated First Class First, winning the gold medal in 1955. His classmates tell the story that he was known amongst the students as Kabi (meaning "poet") and it was widely expected that he would top the class.

He started a business on graphic design in 1956 named D G Press and Publicity Syndicate.

== Artistic ==
Though occupied with his business of graphic designs and commercial art, he continued to work on his main interests, painting portraits and landscapes.

=== Swakalbela ===
In 1979, he started his project Swakalbela (my own time) where he planned to paint portraits of 100 of his contemporaries. These series of portraits were painted directly with brush without any drawing and were completed in 2 or 3 sittings, each lasting between 60 and 90 minutes. He completed 62 portraits. He was also writing a book about the subjects of these portraits.

== Literary ==
In 1977, he started a literary magazine, originally titled Mukto Patra. Later, he started a publishing business, naming that Mukto Patra Publications and renamed the magazine Shilpo O Sahitya. As editor, he was always seeking out new and lesser known poets, authors and artists.

In 1986, he started the annual Shilpo O Sahitya awards for little magazines. All Bengali little magazines published anywhere in the country were encouraged to enter and prizes were awarded in 5 categories, best poem, best short story, best non-fiction, best cover design, best editing.

In 1990, he edited an anthology of poems about Kolkata, Kolkata Kavita, to mark the tercentenary of the city.

== Art education ==
He was a consultant on restoration to the "Academy of Fine Arts" and a member of its executive committee. He recommended that the Academy of Fine Arts start a school on art education. Thus, the "Institute of Visual Arts" was founded, and he was the first principal.

Later, he founded the "Academy of Creative Art", Kolkata in 1991 and was its first principal. The academy offers two programmes, and a one-year certificate programme aimed at young artists and a three-year (deemed to be) degree programme aimed at senior artists and those planning to be art teachers.
