= Mali (cartoonist) =

T. R. Mahalingam, better known by his pen-name Mali, was an illustrator and cartoonist from Tamil Nadu, India, in the pre-independence era. He was the Tamil Press's first caricaturists, according to Chennai historian S. Muthiah in The Hindu. Muthiah has written elsewhere that Mali did as much with his strokes for Vikatan as its celebrated editor Kalki Krishnamurthy did with his words.

Mali published his drawings in the Indian Express in the 1930s, and first made his name at the Free Press Journal 'before being immortalised in the pages of Ananda Vikatan, the first popular Tamil periodical'. He also did cartoons for the Vikatan group's English-language Merry Magazine, where he became the editor in 1935. He is said to have left the editorial nitty-gritty to his assistant editor, while continuing to illustrate such humorous serials as 'Private Joyful in Madras' (The magazine shut down in c. 1935 or 1936).

While it was the writer and poet Subramanya Bharathi who first introduced cartoons to Tamil journalism, it was Ananda Vikatan that made them truly popular. As cartoonist and senior artist at Ananda Vikatan, Mali was thus a key influence on a second generation of cartoonists. Gopulu and Silpi were illustrators he mentored at Vikatan.

According to Tamil film historian Randor Guy, Mali designed the famous logo for Gemini Studios, which depicts cherubic twin buglers.

Mali died in c. 1947, according to an obituary in The Indian Review.
