= Saba Hasan =

Indian artist (born 1962)

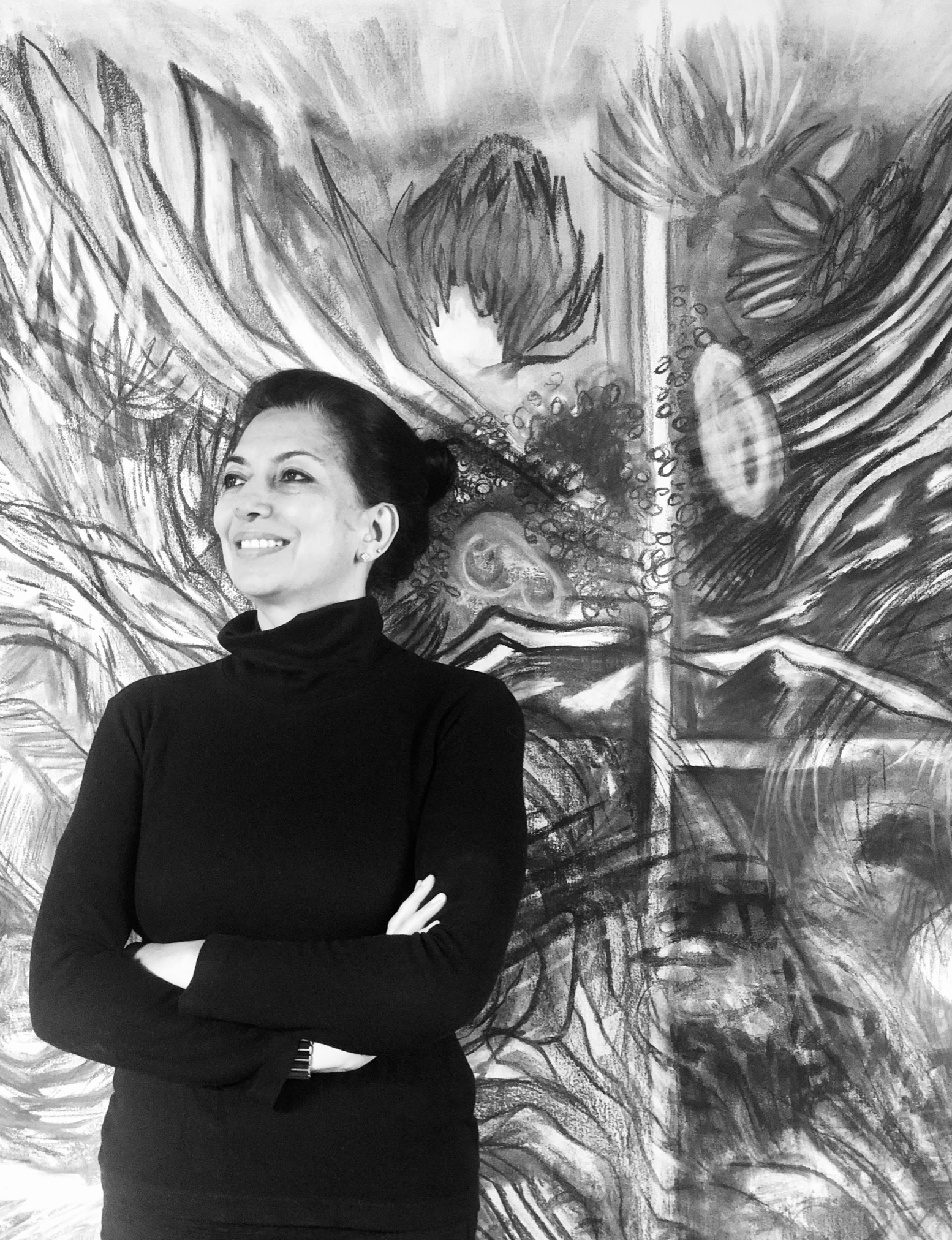
- Hasan in 2020
- Born: New Delhi, India
- Occupation: Artist
- Years active: 1996–present
- Website: www.sabahasan.com

Saba Hasan is an Indian contemporary artist who is based in Goa and New Delhi.

== Education ==
She has a BA (Honours) in Economics from Delhi University, New Delhi and a Masters in Cultural Anthropology from Syracuse University New York. She has also trained in art at the Ceruleum - Ecole d’arts Visuels, Lausanne and art history at the University of Cambridge, UK.

- 1998: Ceruleum: Ecole D’Arts Visuels - Academie, Lausanne, Switzerland
- 1986: Fellowship in Culture Studies, Syracuse University, New York, USA

== Shows and exhibitions ==
An active artist since 1996, Hasan has participated in several art shows, exhibitions, biennale's, photo exhibitions and film festivals. Some of these include: Her work includes painting, photography, book installations, voice works and film. Her works are with collectors in India, UK, Switzerland, Sri Lanka, Japan, Holland, USA, Spain and France.

Saba's most recent show was a solo exhibition of her book sculptures and multimedia works at the Kiran Nadar Museum of Art (KNMA), New Delhi.

Year	Event	Venue
2026	Silver Award: Super Short Film (Death Will Come Like a Shadow)	London Movie Awards, Close-Up Film Centre, London, United Kingdom
2026	Jo ġāyab hai, aur hāzir bhi: Solo Exhibition of Book Sculptures and Multimedia Works	Kiran Nadar Museum of Art (KNMA), New Delhi, India
2024	FICIMAD Festival Internacional de Cine Independiente de Madrid (Official Selection: Micro Movies Category)	mk2 Cine Paz & Sala Cátedra Mayor, Madrid, Spain (Winner: Best Screenplay for 'Death Will Come Like A Shadow')
2023	Cinemistica Festival (Official Selection: Art Film Category)	Corrala de Santiago, Granada, Spain
2023	Amarcort Film Festival (Finalist: Experimental Films)	Amarcort Film Festival, Rimini, Italy
2022	International Experimental Film and Video Festival (Official Selection: Artist Film Category, Catalog 2022)	Bideodromo, Bilbao Arte Fundazio, Bilbao, Spain
2022	Festival of Experimental Videos & Films (Official selection)	Fisura (2022) Centro de Cultura Digital Mexico, Mexico City, Mexico
2022	Posthumous Dialogues With Artist FN Souza (Curator: Sabitha Satchidanandan)	The Museum of Goa (MOG), Pilerne, Goa, India
2021	National Exhibition of Women Artists (Curator: Uma Nair)	National Gallery of Modern Art (NGMA), New Delhi, India
2019	Short film The Saba Bandagi Shah Project	Official selection at the 12the International Documentary and Short Film Festival of Kerala, India
2019	Short film Burnt Books 6	Part of Cinema of Resistance collective at the 12the International Documentary and Short Film Festival of Kerala, India
2018	Short film Twilight On The Lake	Official selection at the Chelsea Film Festival, New York, USA Official selection at Balinale, the Bali International Film Festival, Indonesia
2017	The Universe of Interconnected Experiences	Alliance Française, New Delhi, India
2016	Video and Photography Show	Tenshin Okakura Gallery, Japan Foundation, New Delhi, India
2015	Video project Saba Hasan Reads Her Poems	Kochi-Muziris Biennale, Kochi, India
2014	Video project Haqeeqat/The Truth/La Verite	Exhibition of Celeste Art Prize Finalists at Assab One, Milan, Italy
2013	Song of a Departing Day	La Biennale di Venezia, 55th Venice Biennale, Venice, Italy
2013	The Sketchbook Project	Brooklyn Art Library, New York, USA
2013	Sound program Audio Portraits in Space	Osso Radio Sound Festival, Lisbon, Portugal
2011	Visual Ventures	Emami Chisel Art, Calcutta, India
2010	Contemporary Drawings	Emami Chisel Art, Calcutta, India
2010	Sound Installation	Oscar Kokoschka Akademie, Salzburg, Austria
2008	Ten Creative Forces	Tao Art Gallery, Mumbai, India Navya Art Gallery, New Delhi, India; Time and Space Gallery, Bangalore, India
2007	Art for Freedom	Bonhams Asia House Auction, London, UK
2007	Indifferent History	Cymroza Art Gallery, Mumbai, India
2006	Letters from Baton Rouge	Paris, France
2005	Florence Biennale	Florence, Italy
2004	The Written Word	Apparao Galleries, Chennai, India
1996	Debut Solo Show	India International Centre, New Delhi, India

== Awards and recognition ==
Some of Hasan's awards and accolades include:

- 2026: Silver Award: Super Short Film, London Movie Awards, London, United Kingdom
- 2024: FICIMAD Festival Internacional de Cine Independiente de Madrid, Spain
- 2023: Vienna International Film Awards, Austria
- 2023: Mannheim Arts and Film Festival, Germany
- 2022: Indo-French International Film Festival, Pondicherry, India
- 2022: Pollock-Krasner Foundation Grant, New York, USA
- 2014: MIFA: Moscow International Foto Awards, Moscow, Russia
- 2014: Celeste Contemporary Art Prize Nomination, Milan, Italy
- 2008: RPG Art Residency, Madh Island, India
- 2007: Award for Painting, Raza Foundation, India
- 2006: Residency in Paris, Government of France
- 2002: Residency, George Keyt Foundation, Colombo, Sri Lanka
