= Atasi Barua =

Atasi Barua (4 September 1921 – 26 June 2016) was one of the prominent Indian women painters of the 20th century. Her work has been exhibited in places like Colombo, Tehran, Cairo, Bangkok, Tokyo and the United States, apart from India, Nepal, and Sri Lanka. Her paintings usually contain classical themes while her techniques also show a mix of realism. There are a lot of references to Buddhism that can be found in her art.

== Early life and education ==
Atasi Barua was born on 4 September 1921 the daughter of Sarojbasini Devi and Asit Kumar Haldar in West Bengal. She was the great-grand niece of Rabindranath Tagore who in fact named her. She was born at Shantiniketan. She studied at La Martiniere College in Lucknow.

== Career in art ==
She started painting at an young age, to cope with the early demise of her mother. Her father, who was a well-known painter himself, constantly encouraged and motivated her passion. She trained herself in various techniques and soon become a talented artist.

She was married to Dr. Arabinda Barua, a native of Chittagong and an eminent Buddhist scholar, who did his Bar At Law from England & was nominated to the Bengal Legislative Council in 1937. Dr. Arabinda Barua was Nirodbaran's paternal cousin. Her exposure to Buddhism gave her immense inspiration, which can be seen in her paintings. They revolve around portraying the life of Buddha, the cave paintings of Ajanta, and many other themes.

She won a cash reward at the 11th Annual Exhibition of the Academy of Fine Arts, Kolkata, after which she started getting international attention for her paintings. Her paintings were also held in solo exhibitions in Kolkata, where she was praised by many critics like O. C. Ganguly and Abani C. Banerjee.

She and her husband travelled a lot and attended many conferences in South Asia. She also made portraits of many well-known personalities and scholars that she met, and also got them signed. Some of them are Jamini Roy, Nandalal Bose, B. R. Ambedkar, Ho Chi Minh, O. C. Gangooly, Nabanita Dev Sen and Kalidas Nag.

The majority of her artwork was line drawings. Drawing inspiration from Lord Buddha’s life, she chronicled his life in 12 paintings after she was requested to do so by the Maha Bodhi Society who then published them in a pictorial book. She was also commissioned by the Digambar Jain Temple to do a series of paintings on the 23rd Tirthankara, Parshvanatha.
