= Maniam =

T.U. Subramaniam (Maniam)
- Born: 1924; Mylapore, Chennai, India
- Died: 1968 (aged 43–44)
- Occupation: Illustrator

T.U. Subramaniam (1924-1968), also known as Maniam, was an illustrator for Tamil magazines, known for his reconstructions of the past in illustrations for popular historical fiction.

== Biography ==
Maniam learned to draw at a young age by watching his uncle Lingayyah sketch. He studied at a school in Mylapore, Chennai, and later at School of Arts, Chennai under Devi Prasad Roy Choudhury. While still a student, he was introduced to Kalki Krishnamurthy, the celebrated novelist and editor of Kalki magazine. Impressed by his work, Kalki urged the young artist to leave his studies and work with him. Maniam thus came to work with Kalki. For his guru and guide, he illustrated the serialized novels Sivagamiyin Sapatham set in the Pallava kingdom, and the classic Ponniyin Selvan depicting the Chola age. Maniam's illustrations for the latter classic employed a variety of techniques and mediums, from pen & ink to gouache and watercolour.

Maniam's visualization of the Tamil classical past was much admired in his time, and his depictions of Bharatanatyam postures drew praise from noted classical dancers such as Padma Subrahmanyam.Maniam travelled widely with Kalki to study and sketch the art of Ajanta, Ellora, Hampi, Badami, Mamallapuram and Thanjavur. When Kalki's Parthiban Kanavu (1960) was filmed, Maniam was the obvious choice for art director. He also designed costumes for a few other films.

Maniam died in 1968. His only son T.S. Loganathan, alias Maniam Selvan (1950- ) is a leading illustrator in Tamil magazines.

== Bibliography ==
- Ponniyin Selvan by Kalki Krishnamurthy, illustrated by Maniam. (Reissued by Vikatan with Maniam's original illustrations)
