= Rajan Krishnan =

Contemporary Indian artist

Rajan Krishnan രാജൻ കൃഷ്ണൻ
- Born: Rajan Krishnan; 14 December 1968; Cheruthuruthy, Thrissur, Kerala
- Died: 11 February 2016 (aged 47)
- Education: NSS College, Ottapalam in 1989 & College of Fine Arts Trivandrum in 1990
- Occupations: Artist, Painter
- Spouse: Renu Ramanath
- Parent(s): Krishnan & Narayani
- Awards: Kerala Lalithakala Akademi in 2010

Rajan Krishnan was a modern Indian artist based in Kerala.

== Early life and background ==
Rajan, hailing from Pallikkal - a small village near Cheruthuruthy in the Thrissur district of Kerala - was born as the sixth of seven children of Mandalaparambil Krishnan and Narayani. He received his early education at the Government High School in Cheruthuruthy, and enrolled for BA Economics at NSS College, Ottapalam. However, his passion lay in the visual arts, and thus he dropped out of the Economics course in 1989 and joined the College of Fine Arts, Thiruvananthapuram in 1990. After completing his BFA from the same college in 1994, he went on to pursue an MFA at the M.S. University, Baroda. In 1996, after completing MFA, Rajan returned to his home State, opting to work from there instead of migrating to large metros of India like many of his contemporaries were doing at that time.

== Career ==
For three years, Rajan lived and worked in Thiruvananthapuram - serving as a Guest Lecturer at his alma mater, the College of Fine Arts Trivandrum. In 2000, he relocated to Kochi, participating in group shows and organising exhibitions and art-related events in the city. Finally, in 2004, his first solo show was held at Kashi Art Gallery, founded by the late Anoop Skaria and Dorrie Younger in Fort Kochi.
