= Bijan Choudhury =

Indian painter (1931–2012)

Bijan Choudhury (1931–2012) was a Bengal-born painter known for his activities as part of the Calcutta Painters in India.

Choudhury was born in Faridpur, Bengal (now Bangladesh) in 1931. He moved to Calcutta where he studied at the Government College of Art and Craft, but because of his Marxist beliefs he was expelled before he could graduate. He returned to Bengal and graduated from the Dacca Art College (now the University of Dhaka).

Choudhury was one of the artists that formed the Society of Contemporary Artists in 1960. In 1964 together with Nikhil Biswas, Prakash Karmakar, Rabin Mondal, Jogen Chowdhury and Dharaj Chowdhury he founded the Calcutta Painters to break from the traditions of the Bengal School of Art. In the late '70s he became head of the Indian College of Art and Draftsmanship.

Choudhury died on 16 March 2012. After his death, an exhibition of his paintings was arranged by the Bengal Gallery of Fine Arts at the Bengal Gallery in May 2012.
