= Kochi-Muziris Biennale 2018 =

Kochi-Muziris Biennale 2018 കൊച്ചി-മുസിരിസ് ബിനാലെ 2018
- Genre: International Art Exhibition (Contemporary art)
- Begins: 12 December 2018
- Ends: 29 March 2019
- Locations: Kochi, India
- Founded: 2012
- Attendance: 600,000 (2016-17)
- People: Anita Dube (Curator); Bose Krishnamachari (co-founder and president of KBF)
- Website: www.kochimuzirisbiennale.org

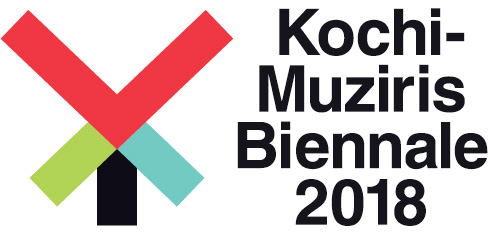
Logo of 4th Kochi-Muziris Biennale of the year 2018

The Kochi-Muziris Biennale 2018 was the fourth edition of the Kochi-Muziris Biennale, an international exhibition of contemporary art held in Kochi, Kerala. Curated by Anita Dube, it commenced on 12 December 2018 and concluded on 29 March 2019. Similar to previous editions, the main venues included Aspinwall House, Pepper House, Kasi Art Café, Cabral Yard, and David Hall. The event was inaugurated by the Chief Minister of Kerala, Pinarayi Vijayan. The Kochi-Muziris Biennale is organised by the Kochi Biennale Foundation with support from the Government of Kerala.

The curatorial theme for this edition was Possibilities for a Non-Alienated Life.

== History ==
In May 2010, Mumbai-based contemporary artists of Kerala origin, Bose Krishnamachari and Riyaz Komu, were approached by the then Minister for Culture of Kerala, M.A. Baby, to initiate an international art project in the state. Subsequently, the Kochi Biennale Foundation was established in 2010.

The first Kochi-Muziris Biennale commenced on 12 December 2012. It featured 88 artists from 30 countries, site-specific works, and a sustained educational programme over a period of three months. Subsequent editions were held in 2014 and 2016.

== Features ==
=== Art room for children ===
An art room was established by the Kochi Biennale Foundation as part of the Art by Children project, aimed at nurturing artistic talent among children.

=== Biennale guided tours ===
In addition to providing a short guide and wall texts, the Kochi Biennale Foundation organised free public tours as well as reserved guided walks.

== List of artists ==
A total of 94 projects by 138 artists from 32 countries were exhibited in the biennale.

Artist	Country
Aernout Mik	Netherlands
Afrah Shafiq	India
Ajay Desai	India
Akram Zaatari	Lebanon
Anjali Monteiro and K. P. Jayasankar	India
Anoli Perera	Sri Lanka
Arunkumar. H. G	India
Anju Dodiya	India
Annu Palakunnathu Matthew	India / United States
Araya Rasdjarmrearnsook	Thailand
Arya krishnan	India
Bapi Das	India
Barthélémy Toguo	Cameroon
Bracha Ettinger	Israel
Brook Andrew	Australia
B. V. Suresh	India
Celia-Yunior	Cuba
Chandan Gomes	India
Chitra Ganesh	India
Chittaprosad	India
Cyrus Kabiru	Kenya
Dennis Muraguri	Kenya
Domenec	Spain
E. B. Itso	Denmark
Edible Archives (artist collective)	India (edible-art collective)
Valie Export	Austria
Goshka Macuga	Poland
Guerrilla Girls	United States
Hassan Khan and Andeel	Egypt
Heri Dono	Indonesia
Ines Doujak and John Barker	Austria / United Kingdom
Jitish Kallat	India
Julie Gough	Australia
Jun Nguyen-Hatsushiba	Japan / Vietnam
Juul Kraijer	Netherlands
K P Krishnakumar	India
Kausik Mukhopadhyay	India
Kibuuka Mukisa Oscar	Uganda
Leandro Feal	Cuba
Lubna Chowdhary	United Kingdom
Madhvi Parekh	India
Marlene Dumas	Netherlands
Martha Rosler	United States
Marzia Farhana	Bangladesh
Mireille Kassar	France / Lebanon
Mochu and Suvani Suri	India
Monica Mayer	Mexico
Mrinalini Mukherjee	India
Nathan Coley	United Kingdom
Nilima Sheikh	India
Oorali	India
The Otolith Group	United Kingdom
Pangrok Sulap	Malaysia
Prabhakar Pachpute	India
Priya Ravish Mehra	India
Probir Gupta	India
Radenko Milak	Bosnia Hercegovina
Rana Hamadeh	Netherlands / Lebanon
Rania Stephan	Lebanon
Rehana Zaman	Pakistan
Rina Banerjee	United States / India
Rula Halawani	Palestine
Santha KV	India
Santu Mofokeng	South Africa
P. R. Satheesh	India
Shambhavi	India
Shilpa Gupta	India
Shirin Neshat	Iran / United States
Shubigi Rao	Singapore
Sister Library	India
Song Dong	China
Sonia Khurana	India
Srinagar Biennale	India
Sue Williamson	South Africa
Sunil Gupta and Charan Singh	India / United Kingdom
Sunil Janah	India
Tabita Rezaire	France French Guiana South Africa
Tania Bruguera	Cuba
Tania Candiani	Mexico
Tejal Shah	India
Temsuyanger Longkumer	India
Thomas Hirschhorn	Switzerland
Vanessa Baird	Norway
Veda Thozhur Kolleri	India
Vicky Roy	India
Vinu VV	India
Vipin Dhanurdharan	India
Vivian Caccuri	Brazil
Subhash Singh Vyam and Durgabai Vyam	India
Walid Raad	Lebanon
William Kentridge	South Africa
Young-Hae Chang Heavy Industries	South Korea
Zanele Muholi	South Africa

== See also ==
- Kochi Muziris Biennale
- Anita Dube
