= Shubigi Rao =

Singaporean contemporary artist and writer

- Born: 1975 (age 50–51); Bombay, Maharashtra, India
- Education: BA English Lit (University of Delhi, 1996); BFA (LASALLE College of the Arts, 2006); MFA (LASALLE College of the Arts, 2008)
- Known for: Installation art, video art, film, drawing, etching, writing, publishing
- Movement: Contemporary art
- Website: https://www.shubigi.com

Shubigi Rao (born 1975) is an Indian-born Singaporean contemporary artist and writer known for her long-term, multidisciplinary projects and installation works that often use books, etchings, drawings, video, and archives. Her interests include archaeology, libraries, neuroscience, histories and lies, literature and violence, and natural history. Rao has exhibited internationally, presenting work at the 59th Venice Biennale in 2022, the 16th Sharjah Biennial in 2025, 10th AsiaPacific Triennial in 2021, 10th Taipei Biennial in 2016, the 3rd Pune Biennale in 2017, the 2nd Singapore Biennale in 2008, as well as the 4th Kochi-Muziris Biennale in 2018.

In 2018, Rao received the Juror's Choice Award at the APB Foundation Signature Art Prize for her work, Written in the Margins (2014–2016), the first instalment of her ongoing 10-year project on the destruction of books and libraries, titled Pulp: A Short Biography of the Banished Book. In 2024 Rao won the Singapore Literature Prize in Creative Nonfiction for her book, 'Pulp III: An Intimate Inventory of the Banished Book', after having previously won the same prize in 2020 for Pulp II: A Visual Bibliography of the Banished Book. The first volume from the Pulp project was also shortlisted for the Singapore Literature Prize in 2018.

Rao curated the fifth edition of South Asia's biggest visual arts event, the Kochi-Muziris Biennale, which was initially planned to take place from December 2020 to April 2021, before being postponed to 2022 due to COVID-19. Alongside Kochi-Muziris Biennale founder and artist Bose Krishnamachari, Rao was featured on the 2019 and 2020 editions of the ArtReview Power 100 list, which charts the most influential individuals working in contemporary art.

In 2022, Rao represented Singapore at the 59th Venice Biennale with the project Pulp III: A Short Biography of The Banished Book, with Ute Meta Bauer as curator for the artistic team.

== Education and personal life ==
Rao was born in 1975 in Mumbai, and grew up in the Himalayas. She is currently based in Singapore. In 1996, Rao obtained her Bachelor of Arts (Honours) in English Literature from the University of Delhi. She would later obtain her Diploma in Fine Arts, Bachelor of Fine Arts (First Class) and Master of Fine Arts (First Class) from LASALLE College of the Arts, Singapore in 2005, 2006, and 2008 respectively.

She previously lectured part-time in Art Theory and was a MFA Dissertation supervisor for the Faculty of Fine Arts at LASALLE College of the Arts.

== Career ==
From 2003 to 2013, Rao assumed the role of a fictitious male scientist named S. Raoul and presented his work at scientific conferences and group art exhibitions. Rao "killed him off" in a 2013 solo show at the Institute of Contemporary Arts Singapore, The Retrospectacle of S. Raoul, which memorialised him after he supposedly tripped over an installation by Rao and died. The exhibition assembled some of Rao's works from the past 10 years that was based around the figure of Raoul. The exhibition was accompanied by the publication, History's Malcontents: The Life And Times of S. Raoul, which served both as a guide to the character of Raoul, and to a selection of Rao’s works beyond the show itself.

In 2014, Rao initiated her currently ongoing 10-year project on the destruction of books and libraries, Pulp: A Short Biography of the Banished Book. In 2016, as an artist-in-residence at the NTU Centre for Contemporary Art Singapore, Rao self-published the first book from her project, also titled Pulp: A Short Biography of the Banished Book. The book was later nominated for the 2018 Singapore Literature Prize. It would also be included in '50 Greatest Works of SingLit', a list of the greatest books of Singaporean literature from the 19th century to the present day.

From June 2016 to May 2017, as an international artist-in-residence at Künstlerhaus Bethanien, Berlin, Rao would develop the first instalment of the Pulp project, Written in the Margins (2014–2016). In 2018, she would receive the Juror's Choice Award at the APB Foundation Signature Art Prize for Written in the Margins. In August 2018 at Objectifs, Singapore, Rao would hold the solo exhibition, The Wood for the Trees, which functioned as a "visual bibliography" of the various texts, individuals, and sites Rao had encountered in the duration of her ongoing Pulp project. Here, she would launch the second volume of her project, titled Pulp II: A Visual Bibliography of the Banished Book.

During the fourth edition of the Kochi-Muziris Biennale from December 2018 to March 2019, Rao was Singapore's sole representative, presenting a video installation that constructed a fictive history of book smugglers in the Indian port city.

In February 2019, Rao exhibited alongside American actress and artist Lucy Liu in a joint exhibition at the National Museum of Singapore, Unhomed Belongings.

In May 2019, it was announced that Rao would curate the fifth edition of the Kochi-Muziris Biennale. Alongside Kochi-Muziris Biennale founder and artist Bose Krishnamachari, Rao was featured on the 2019 edition of the ArtReview Power 100 list, which charts the most influential individuals working in contemporary art. Titled "In our Veins Flow Ink and Fire," its first announced artist list involved 25 participating artists and collectives. She would be featured alongside Krishnamachari on the ArtReview Power 100 list once again in 2020.

In 2024, Rao won the Singapore Literature Prize in Creative Nonfiction for her third volume from the Pulp project, 'Pulp III: An Intimate Inventory of the Banished Book'. She had previously won for her second volume from the project, Pulp II: A Visual Bibliography of the Banished Book. The judging panel, comprising Clarissa Oon, Eddie Tay and Sarah Churchwell, commented: “Probing, exhaustive in its global scope, intellectually ambitious and deeply felt, the second volume in artist-writer Shubigi Rao’s decade-long documentary project on reading, libraries and censorship gets to the heart of what ‘creative non-fiction’ can be. As a book on the value of books, rendered through incisive prose and visual imagery, it provokes the whole question of what a book is, in terms of form. In terms of content, it is replete with insight and wisdom, constantly shifting our expectations of the subject matter and in the process, able to stand with the best in world literature."

Rao represented Singapore with 'Pulp III' at the Singapore Pavilion for the 59th Venice Biennale in 2022, with Ute Meta Bauer serving as curator for the artistic team. Her work was listed as one of the best national pavilions by Artsy, The Arts Newspaper, and Weltkunst among others, and garnered significant media and public attention.

Her solo exhibition in 2022-2023 These Petrified Paths on the destruction of cultural heritage in Armenia and the complicity of oil geopolitics, included a feature film and an exhibition that occupied four floors of the Rockbund Art Museum in Shanghai, China. Curated by X-Zhu Nowell, the exhibition was widely reviewed.

== Art ==
=== S. Raoul ===
As part of her projects from 2003 to 2013, Rao assumed the identity of S. Raoul, a fictional archaeologist, scientist, and theorist, whose interests spanned immortal jellyfish to the risks of brain damage posed by contemporary art. Rao's interests were expressed through the persona of Raoul, which included archaeological studies of contemporary Singapore in works such as The Study of Leftovers, Pseudoscience in Suitcase, and Earth=Unearth.

Originally commissioned for the 2008 Singapore Biennale, The Tuning Fork of the Mind involves a tongue-in-cheek brain scan conducted through a series of steps that revealed the supposedly damaging effects of exposure to contemporary art upon one's brain.

=== Pulp ===
Initiated in 2014, Pulp: A Short Biography of the Banished Book is Rao's current ongoing 10-year film, book, and visual art project, with Rao visiting various collections both public and private, libraries, and archives internationally for research. The project examines the history of book destruction, censorship, and various other forms of repression, conceiving of the book as a symbol of resistance, focusing on instances such as the 1992 shelling of Sarajevo's national library.

The first instalment of the project, Written in the Margins (2014–2016), was presented at the Künstlerhaus Bethanien, Berlin in 2016 and the APB Foundation Signature Art Prize exhibition in Singapore in 2018. This installation featured drawings, books, and an interactive archive of video testimonials from activists and individuals involved in saving or destroying books, such as Firefighters who attempted to save the burning national library of Sarajevo during civil unrest in the 1990s, or smugglers of books and paintings who brought these objects to safety during that period. Three of five planned volumes of books have been published for the project, the first being Pulp: A Short Biography of the Banished Book, the second, Pulp II: A Visual Bibliography of the Banished Book', and the third Pulp III: An Intimate Inventory of the Banished Book.

== Awards ==
In 2024 Rao won the Singapore Literature Prize in Creative Nonfiction for her book, Pulp III: An Intimate Inventory of the Banished Book. In 2020, Rao also won the Singapore Literature Prize (Creative Nonfiction) for her book Pulp II: A Visual Bibliography of the Banished Book. Rao also won the Juror's Choice Award at the APB Foundation Signature Art Prize 2018 for the first instalment of the Pulp project, Written in the Margins (2014–2016). Rao has also been commissioned by Singapore's Land Transport Authority to develop a public artwork for the Stevens interchange on the upcoming Thomson–East Coast MRT line. She has been awarded the Creation Grant (2019, 2013), and the Presentation Grant (2023, 2018, 2013, 2012), from the National Arts Council Singapore, and was awarded the Winston Oh Travel Award in 2005.

== Selected exhibitions and projects ==
Dates	Title	Notes	Location
2005	Print Out	Group exhibition	Singapore Tyler Print Institute, Singapore
2005	500 and Below	Group fundraising exhibition	Plastique Kinetic Worms, Singapore
2005	New Contemporaries: New Art from LASALLE-SIA	Part of the Singapore Art Show	Earl Lu Gallery, Institute of Contemporary Arts Singapore
2005	The Winston Oh Travel Award (Practice)	Group exhibition	Earl Lu Gallery, Institute of Contemporary Arts Singapore
2006	Appetites for Litter: 8th Emerging Artists Show	Group exhibition	Plastique Kinetic Worms, Singapore
2007	Singapore Art Show	Group exhibition	Singapore Art Museum, Singapore
2007	Autobibliophiles: Artists Who Make or Use Books	Group exhibition	Studio Bibliothèque, Hong Kong
2008	The Tuning Fork of the Mind for Wonder, 2nd Singapore Biennale	Group exhibition	2nd Singapore Biennale, Singapore
2009	The Longest Distance: The 10th Anniversary of The Winston Oh Travel Award	Group exhibition	Institute of Contemporary Arts Singapore
2009	Found & Lost	Group exhibition	Osage Gallery, Singapore
2010	Singapore Survey 2010: Beyond LKY	Group exhibition	Valentine Willie Fine Art, Singapore
2010	Etiquette I: On Sitting Down & Shutting Up	Group exhibition	The Substation, Singapore
2011	Etiquette II: On Getting Down & Dirty	Group exhibition	The Substation, Singapore
2012	CON[TEXT]	Group exhibition	NUS Museum, Singapore
2012	Singapore Survey 2012: New Strange Faces	Group exhibition	Valentine Willie Fine Art, Singapore
2012	Still Building: Contemporary Art from Singapore	Group exhibition organised by Valentine Willie Fine Art	Selasar Sunaryo Art Space, Bandung, Indonesia
2012	TADAEX	Group exhibition	The 2nd Tehran Annual Digital Art Exhibition, Iran
2012	Entering the Mind's I	With the Association of Neuroaesthetics, Berlin, Germany	Conference of the Organisation for Human Brain Mapping (OHBM), Beijing, China
2013	re-new 2013 Digital Arts Festival	Performance	Copenhagen, Denmark
2013	Panoramic Imprint	Group exhibition	The Substation, Singapore
2013	OH! Open House: The Happiness Index	Group exhibition	Marina Bay, Singapore
2013	Useful Fictions	Solo exhibition	Grey Projects, Singapore
2013	The Retrospectacle of S. Raoul	Solo exhibition	Earl Lu Gallery, Institute of Contemporary Arts Singapore
2014	The Disappearance	Group exhibition	NTU Centre for Contemporary Art Singapore
2015	Urban:ness	Group exhibition	DUCTAC, Dubai, United Arab Emirates
2015	Shubigi Rao: Exquisite Corpse	Showcase under Curating Lab	NUS Museum, Singapore
2015	Mysterious Objects at Noon	Group exhibition	Objectifs, Singapore
2016	Written in the Margins	As international artist-in-residence	Künstlerhaus Bethanien, Berlin
2016	10th Taipei Biennial	Group exhibition	Taipei Fine Arts Museum, Taiwan
2017	3rd Pune Biennale	Group exhibition	Pune, India
2018	The Wood for the Trees	Solo exhibition	Objectifs, Singapore
2018	4th Kochi-Muziris Biennale	Group exhibition	4th Kochi-Muziris Biennale, Kochi, Kerala, India
2018	APB Foundation Signature Art Prize	Group exhibition organised by Singapore Art Museum	National Museum of Singapore
2019	State of Motion: A Fear of Monsters	Group exhibition	Asian Film Archive, Singapore
2019	Unhomed Belongings	Group exhibition with Lucy Liu	National Museum of Singapore
2023	These Petrified Paths	Solo exhibition	Rockbund Art Museum, Shanghai, China

Some of the information in the table above was obtained from Shubigi Rao's artist CV from 21 February 2016, archived and accessed on 27 July 2023.
