= Guesswho =

- Style: Street art
- Movement: Graffiti
- Website: Guesswho on Instagram

Guesswho (or Guess Who) is an anonymous graffiti artist active since 2012 in Fort Kochi, Kerala, India. Guesswho uses street art as a subversive medium of expression to practice and participate in the creation of an ever-changing culture of a city's visual landscape and experiments through wry commentary on socio-political issues. The artist(s)'s paste-ups and stencils have been sighted in Trivandrum and Bangalore as well. One news paper reported that Guesswho said his work was in part a reaction to the Kochi-Muziris Biennale, which he said restricted which artists were publicly showcased. However, in interview to another newspaper, the artist(s) has commended Kochin Biennalle's role in popularizing art in Indian art space. Guesswho clarifies in another interview that the work should be termed as a 'reaction' to Biennale, not a protest. According to The Hindu, his work has "gone viral" since it was featured on the Internet.
