= Anita Dube =

Indian artist

- Born: 28 November 1958 (age 67); Lucknow, Uttar Pradesh, India
- Education: Delhi University, Maharaja Sayajirao University of Baroda
- Occupation: contemporary artist
- Years active: 1970 – present
- Known for: Mixed media sculpture, installation art, art critic, writer

Anita Dube (born 28 November 1958) is an Indian contemporary visual artist and art critic, whose work has been widely exhibited. She is known for her mixed media sculpture and installation art.

== Early life ==
Dube was born on 28 November 1958 in Lucknow, Uttar Pradesh, India to a family of physicians.

She completed her B A. degree with honors in history from the University of Delhi (now Delhi University) in 1979. She completed her M.F.A. degree in art criticism from Maharaja Sayajirao University of Baroda in 1982.

== Career ==
Dube's training as an art historian at Baroda continues to influence her practice as a visual artist, as do her ties to the short-lived but extremely influential Indian Radical Painters' and Sculptors' Association, a group of predominantly Malayali contemporary artists (with Dube a rare exception) formed by K. P. Krishnakumar in Baroda in 1987 that forged an explicitly radical, socially and politically conscious approach to art making in contrast with the more figurative style of painting associated with an earlier generation of artists and faculty at Baroda. Their political position is most fiercely articulated in the manifesto-statement Dube wrote, titled 'Questions and Dialogue' (1987), reprinted in The Hunger of the Republic: Our Present in Retrospect (2021), part of the India Since the 90s series published by Tulika Books. The earlier generation at Baroda were largely part of the so-called "Baroda School" also sometimes called the "narrative painters," a group that came to prominence in the mid to late 1970s, and included figures such as Bhupen Khakhar, Nalini Malani, Vivan Sundaram, Jogen Chowdhury, Sudhir Patwardhan, Ghulam Mohammed Sheikh and critic Geeta Kapur.

In 1987, the Indian Radical Painters and Sculptors Association, led by Krishnakumar, held an exhibition "Questions and Dialogue" at the Faculty of Fine Arts in Baroda, which was accompanied by posters around campus and a manifesto, written by Dube, denouncing the commodification of art in general, and what they saw as the lack of sincere, effective political and social engagement on the part of the "narrative painters." Dube and her peers at Baroda were committed to a radical project of challenging a retrogressive, bourgeois-centered art industry. This entailed, among other things, a conscious shift in medium: Dube and others focused on inexpensive, industrial materials and found objects in an effort to create works that resisted commodification, connected with working-class audiences, and directed a militant critique at bourgeois notions of art making, display and consumption.

Following the exhibition, the group shifted its activities to Kerala, where another exhibition was held at Kozhikode in February, 1989. Also in 1989, the group staged a demonstration and published a pamphlet excoriating a Sotheby's auction held in Mumbai that year with support from the Times of India — still a novel concept for India's relatively quiet 1980s art market. "The Times of India’s sudden interest in Indian Art and Culture now shows that the Imperialists want to completely poison the people’s mind and life through antihuman projects for artists," it read, adding that the exhibition's invocation of "Timeless" India was the legacy of a "colonialist strategy to see everything as ‘timeless’, and now the Indian ruling classes see their country with the same eyes."

== Controversies ==
On 20 April 2025, Poet Aamir Aziz alleged that his poem ‘Sab Yaad Rakha Jayega’ was used without his 'knowledge, consent, credit or compensation' by Anita Dube. Dube, in a restricted private social media post, stated that she had made an ethical lapse in not crediting him."

== Later work ==
When the Indian Radical Painters and Sculptors Association disbanded in 1989, following the death of KP Krishnakumar, Dube shifted her focus from writing and criticism to making visual art, developing an aesthetic idiom that utilizes found objects and industrial materials, word play and photography in order to offer a sustained analysis and critique of existing social and political conditions in India and beyond. Philippe Vergne, in a 2003 essay, writes that Dube's work "privileges sculptural fragment as a cultural bearer of personal and social memories, history, mythologies and phenomenological experiences."

Dube's language-based sculptural work is particularly notable. She has said that she is “interested in how a word can become architecture”. This interest is evident in a work titled 5 Words (2007), which was included in a 2007-2008 exhibition at the Mattress Factory in Pittsburgh. Consisting of five separate pieces, 5 Words explores the fraught cross-cultural semantics and sculptural possibilities of five value-laden words that begin with the letter W. Another body of work that Dube is known for involves the use of the adhesive-backed, industrially produced ceramic eyes typically affixed to Hindu religious images. An example of this type of work is The Sleep of Reason Creates Monsters (2001), first installed at the Kiasma Museum of Contemporary Art in Helsinki, Finland, makes reference to Francisco Goya’s famous set of aquatint prints, Los Caprichos, produced between 1797 and 1798.

Internationally, her work has been shown at the Mattress Factory, Pittsburgh; the Walker Art Center (Minneapolis), Contemporary Arts Museum (Houston), Museo Rufino Tamayo (Mexico City) and the Havana biennial, among others. Recent solo exhibitions have included shows at Nature Morte (Berlin; 2013); Lakeeren Gallery (Mumbai; 2013); Galerie Dominique Fiat (Paris; 2011); Bose Pacia (New York; 2008), Galerie Almine Rech (Paris; 2007), and Gallery Nature Morte (New Delhi; 2000, 2005). Her work has been included in recent group exhibitions, including shows at the Kiran Nadar Museum of Art (2013), and the Centre Georges Pompidou, Paris (2011). Dube also contributed to the first book in the six volume series India Since the 90s edited by Ashish Rajadhyaksha.

In 1997, Dube cofounded KHOJ, an International Artists' Association in New Delhi. What started as a relatively modest annual workshop has become a major platform for South Asian art within a global context, organizing international workshops, residencies and exhibitions.

Dube is the first female curator of the Kochi-Muziris Biennale.
