= Amar Kutir =

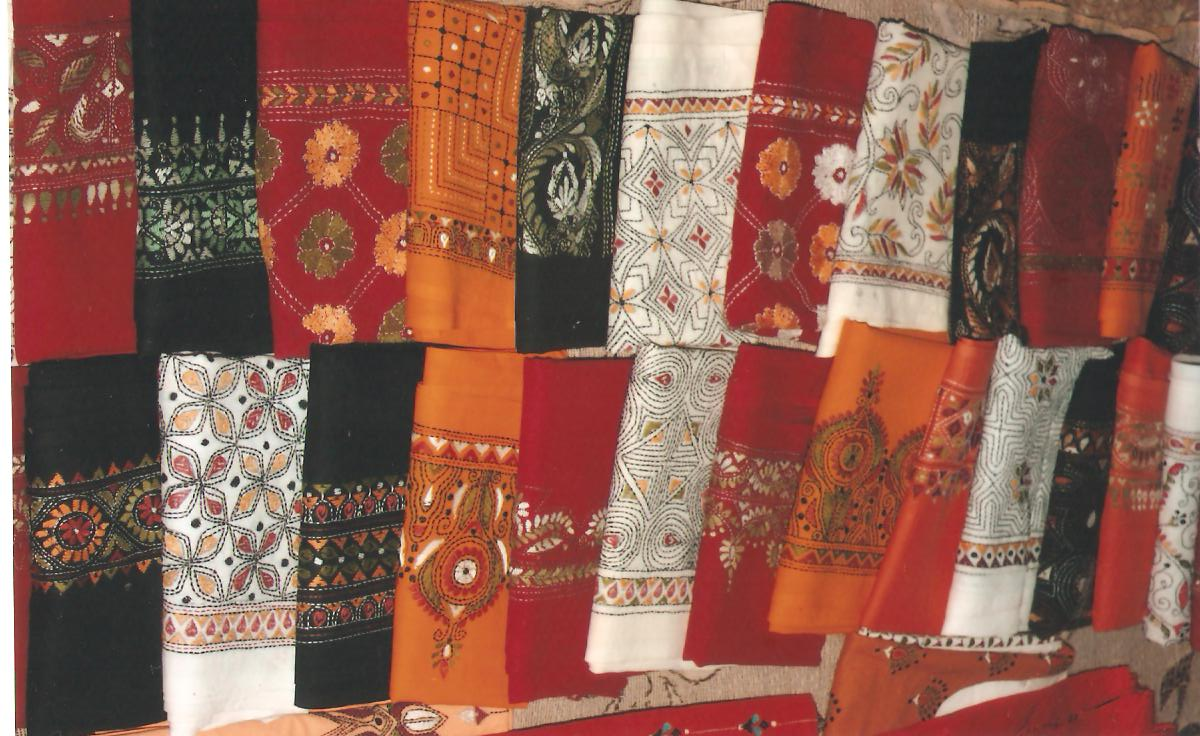
Some Amar Kutir products on display

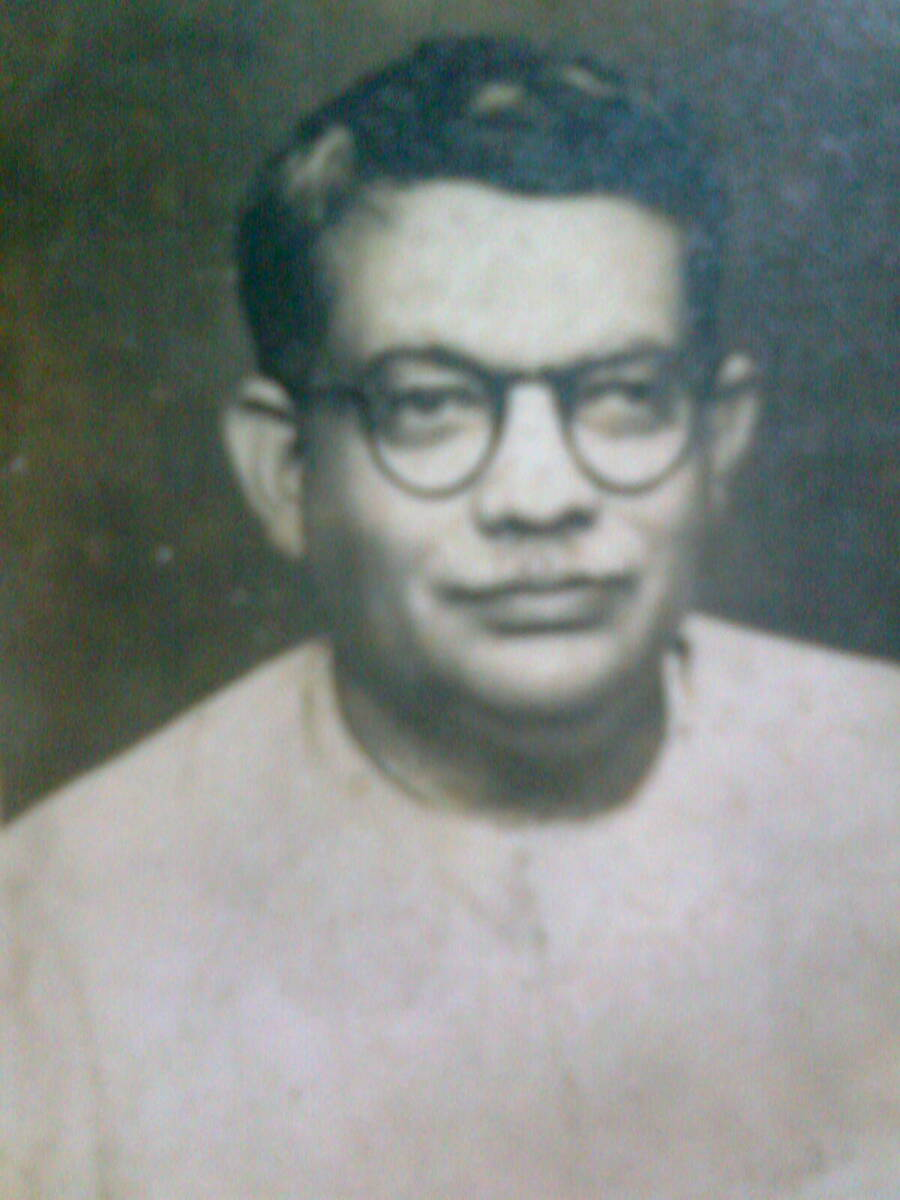
Sushen Mukherjee, the founder of 'Amar Kutir'

Amar Kutir (আমার কুটির) (meaning: my cottage), once a place of refuge for independence movement activists, is a cooperative society for the promotion of arts and crafts. It is located on the banks of the Kopai River, about 15 kilometres (9.3 mi) from Santiniketan in Birbhum district in the Indian state of West Bengal.

== History ==
=== Early years ===
In 1922, on an invitation from Rabindranath Tagore, Mohandas Karamchand Gandhi, just released after imprisonment for political activities, visited Santiniketan. Sushen Mukherjee, a young man, met him there. Mukherjee had been associated with the revolutionary movement for Indian independence for some years. His meeting with Gandhi led to the setting up of Amar Kutir in 1927.

Sushen Mukherjee went through a journey searching for the purpose of life, and perhaps found that life's purpose is "to free yourself from the bondage of foreign rule". Provoked by this self-esteemed ideology and compulsion, he plunged himself into the freedom movement of India.

At this juncture his thought veered round the idea as to how, so many young and youthful boys being involved in freedom movement, would help maintain their day to day living; most of them were fugitives and obviously were out of their families. His idea was to find a haven which would be remote, free of human inhabitant, preferably in the midst of woods to hoodwink cudgels and piercing eyes of ever alert British Police and work on where they could work on sari printing, handloom and leather craft production. He found a place measuring 100 acres (0.40 km^{2}), around the remotest area of Birbhum district in West Bengal, kissing the banks of river Kopai. It happened to be not very far from Bolepur, Shantiniketan, of today. Then he gradually established the rudiments of cottage industry. And he named the place 'Amar Kutir' (my abode).

In 1930, Amar Kutir was raided by the British rulers and Mukherjee was put behind bars for political activities. With Mukherjee behind bars until 1937, the activities of Amar Kutir came to a halt.

=== Mistaken attribution to Tagore ===
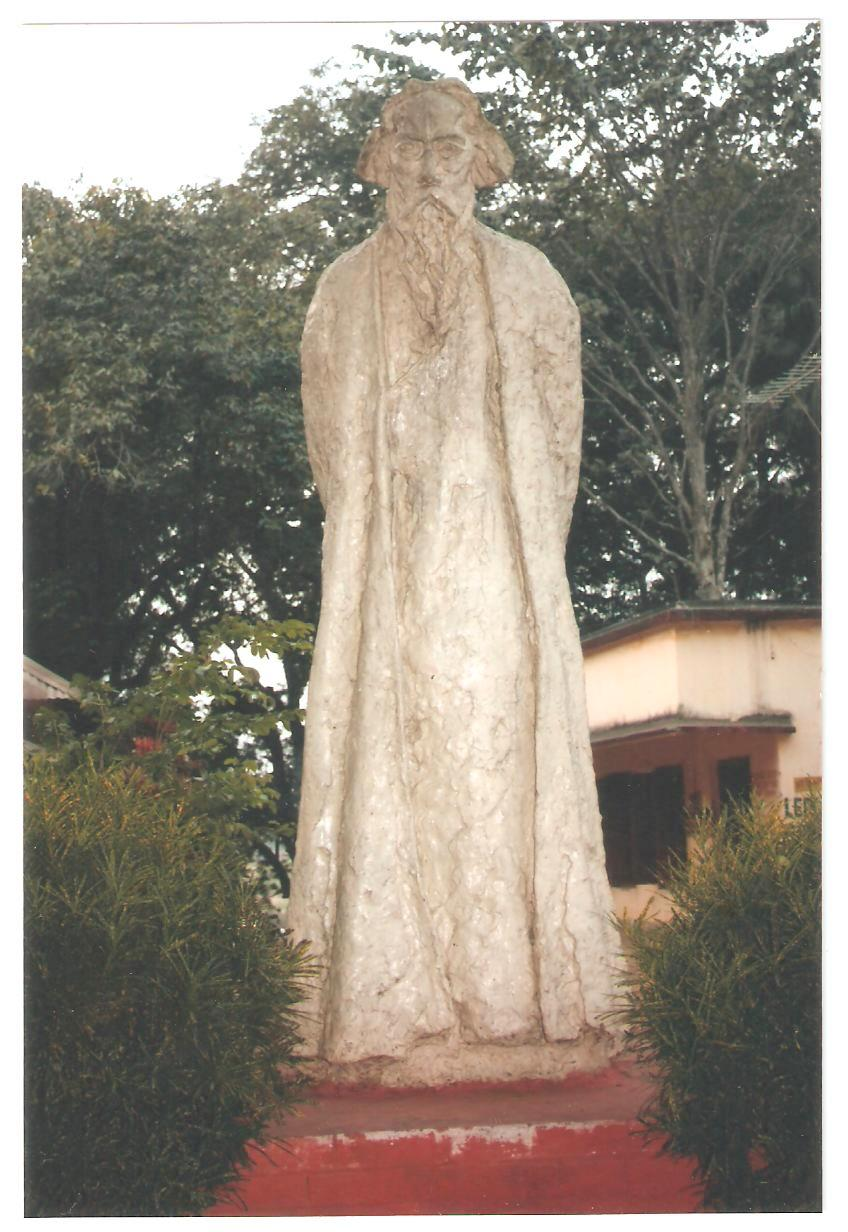
Statue of Rabindranath Tagore by K P Krishnakumar at Amar Kutir

Tagore set up the Institute of Rural Reconstruction at Sriniketan in 1922.

The second but contiguous campus of Visva Bharati was subsequently located around the same place in 1923. It carried on the craft training work started by Silpa Bhavana at Santiniketan. The first cooperative for rural reconstruction was set up at Sriniketan in 1925. Though the above society was situated in the close reach of Rabindranath Tagores's land of Viswa Bharti, never did Tagore ever visit Amar Kutir nor did Amar Kutir receive any attribution from Tagore's land of Shantiniketan.

=== Revolutionaries and Village Craft ===
During his years in prison Mukherjee met several revolutionary leaders, notably Moni Ganguly and Panna Lal Dasgupta. The prisons of British authorities were at that time hot beds of Marxist discussion and training. From 1938 when the British government relaxed its rules and started releasing many of the revolutionaries from prison, they started living and working in Amar Kutir. They were instrumental in organizing night classes and spreading Marxist ideas amongst the rural masses. When the Second World War broke out in 1939, many of the revolutionaries left Amar Kutir and were directly involved in organizing peasant movement in the villages. Many of them were active during the Quit India movement in 1942.

=== Post-independence years ===
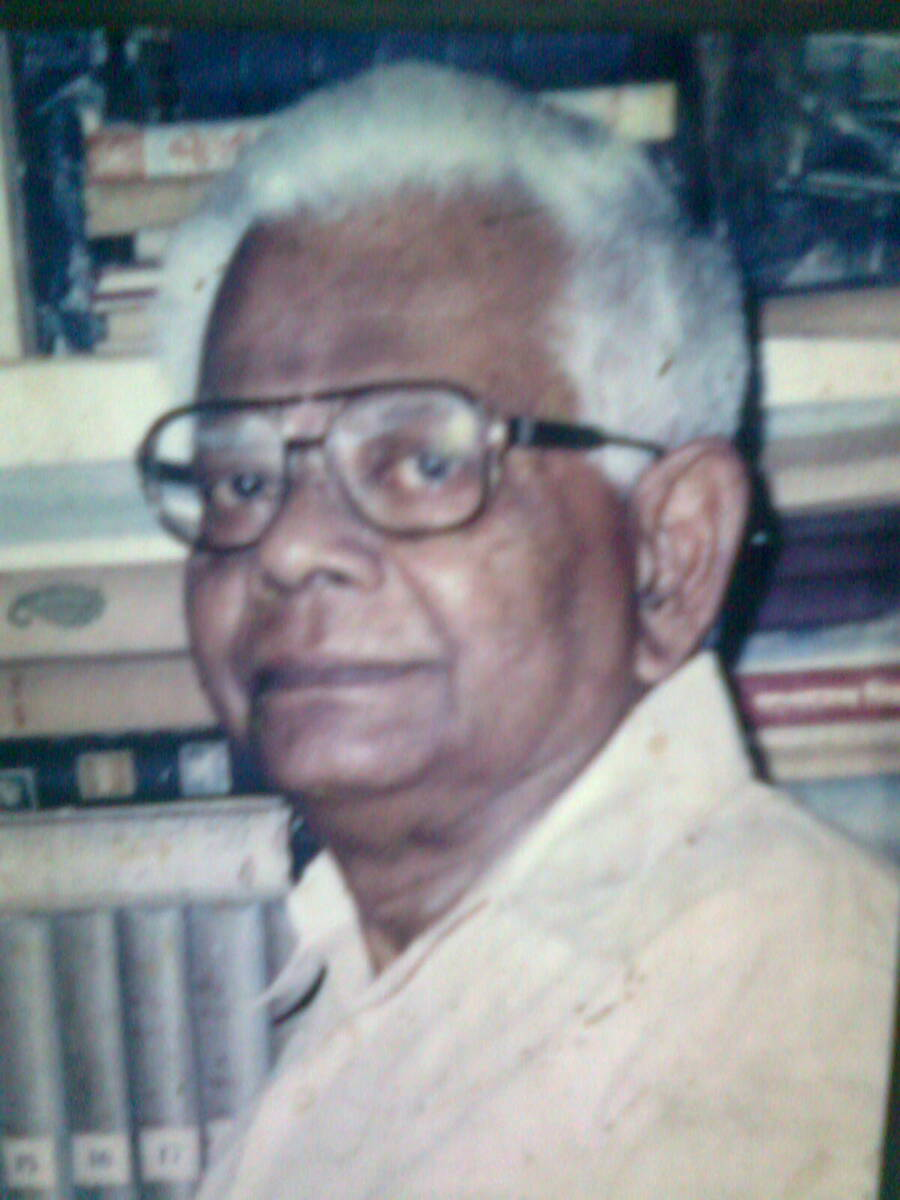
Kamalaksha Bose carried forward the legacy of Sushen Mukherjee at Amar Kutir

After India gained independence from the British, Amar Kutir became a cooperative to rejuvenate and develop rural handicrafts, reflecting the ideals of self–help and sustainable rural development advocated by Tagore. Amar Kutir Society for Rural Development was formally registered in 1978. Sushen Mukherjee adopted two brothers, Kamalaksha Bose and Alok Bose, who continued to run the activities of Amar Kutir after Mukherjee's passing. They ran it from 1955 to 1978/ 1980. Ultimately, they transferred the property to create an autonomous body known as Amar Kutir Society for Rural Development and gifted the property to this society. Thus it became a self-sufficient organisation benefiting the local population.

== Activities ==
Amar Kutir is a cooperative unit that produces leather goods, kantha stitched saris, bamboo crafts and batik. Its leather-craft unit employs mostly women. It has one batik, a needlecraft unit and shola and lac crafts units. Under a Central government scheme, a craft development centre was opened in 1992 at Amar Kutir. In 1993, the Central government set up a hand-block printing training centre at Amar Kutir Complex. Kantha-stitch sarees made here cater to the demands in both national and international markets.

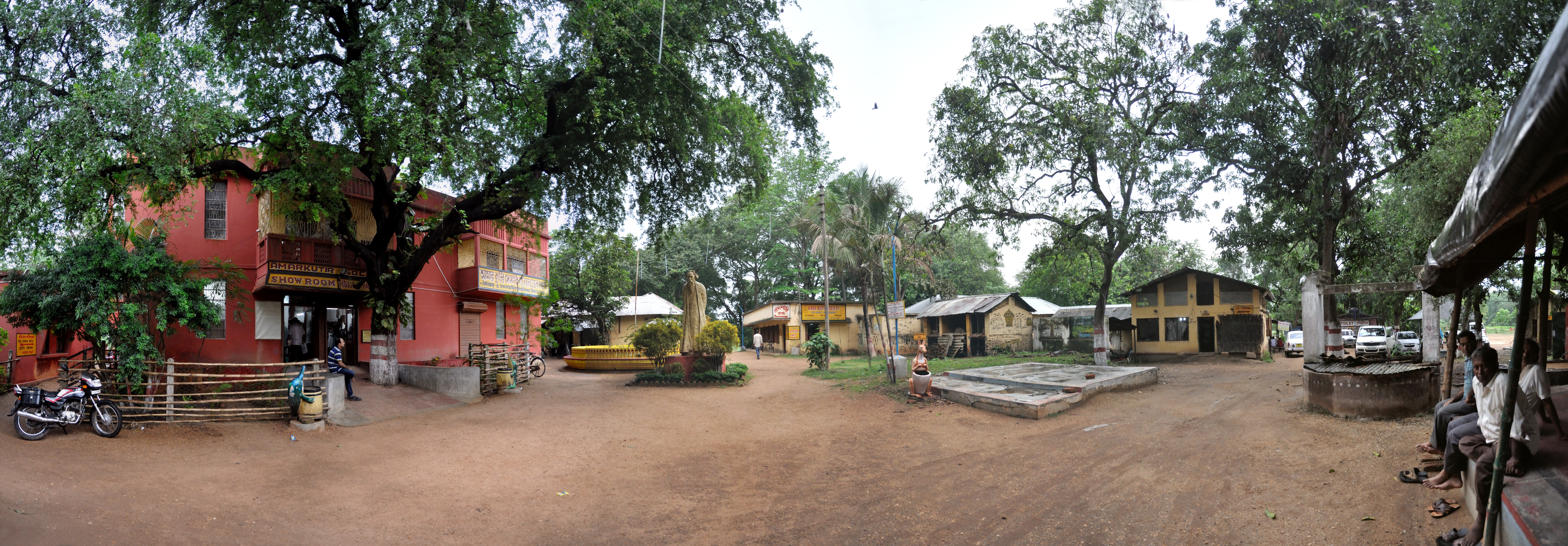
The Amar Kutir complex. Jun. 2014
