= Shilpa Gupta =

Indian artist (born 1976)

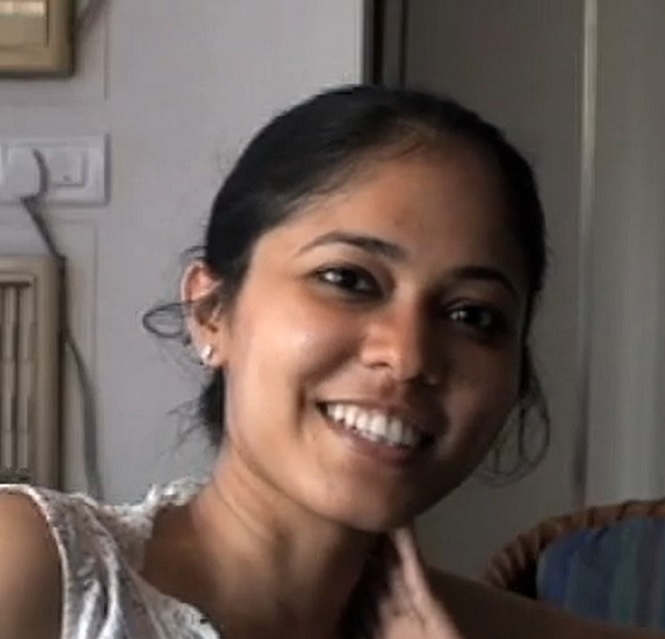
- Gupta in 2012
- Born: 1976 (age 49–50); Mumbai, India
- Known for: Artist
- Website: https://shilpagupta.com/

Shilpa Gupta (born 1976) is a contemporary Indian artist based in Mumbai, India.

== Early life and education ==
Shilpa Gupta was born in 1976 in Mumbai. She pursued her studies in sculpture at the Sir J. J. School of Fine Arts, from 1992 to 1997.

== Work and exhibition ==
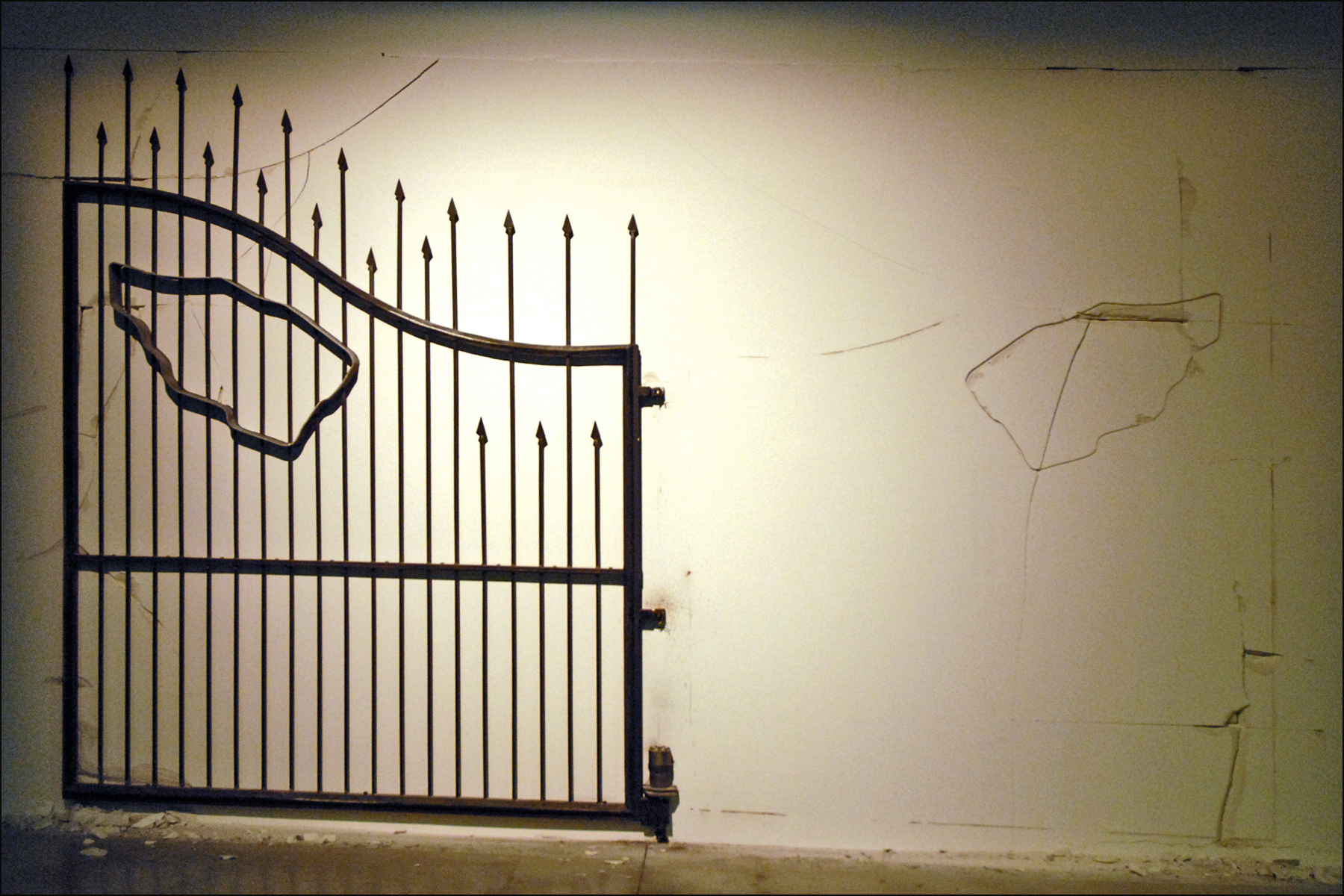
Untitled artwork by Shilpa Gupta (2008-09)

As early as 1995, the artist anonymously mailed ink drawings to a random 300 people whose names she'd collected from her city's public art gallery. She stamped each drawing and sequentially numbered it – with not one but three numbers, one of the drawing itself and one before and one after it.

In an untitled 2001 work, she took a blank canvas on a pilgrimage across India, to forty holy places of different faiths. She asked priests, ascetics, gurus, and silent idols of all types to bless a canvas “such that it will bring peace and happiness wherever it stands. At once, the work is an exploration of the mechanisms of faith and belief and a questioning of the role of the artist in “manifesting collective religious aspirations of society”. The work had several iterations, the final one being, “Blessed Bandwidth”, an internet art work, commissioned by Tate Modern in 2001. The website invited viewers to be blessed online via online pages linked via a cable which the artist carried to various sites of worship. On the website, which upon its launch had gathered several thousands of links, the visitor could download God.exe and images of Holy Waters from different religions, exploring ways in which we define and construct our world. The work asks how is that data stored? What control do we have over our experience of being online?

In her 2001 work “Blame”, she distributed bottles of simulated blood with messages blaming others for aspects they cannot control, such as religion or nationality. She continues to explore this theme in various projects, including "There is No Border Here" (2005), "Someone Else" (2011), and "Altered Inheritances" (2012–14), which highlight issues of identity, boundaries, and personal agency.

Gupta’s started working with sound in 2001 with an interactive work which relayed slurs she had received herself or those she collected. Her explorations of sound have since continued in "Singing Cloud" (2008), consisting of 4000 reversed-function microphones, and "Speaking Wall" (2010), where visitors follow instructions through a headset, transitioning from spectator to performer. For, In Your Tongue I Cannot Fit, (2017–18) corrals the voices of 100 poets who have been imprisoned, and in many cases executed.

Her interactive video projections include "Untitled" (2004), including seven figures, all of whom are the artist, dressed in camouflage and which are controlled by the visitors, and "Shadow 1, 2, and 3" (2006–7), which capture and project real-time silhouettes of visitors.

Her installations extend beyond traditional gallery spaces, with projects like "Someone Else" (2011), featuring books, exhibited in public libraries around the world. Gupta has also created outdoor light installations, such as "I live under your sky too" (2004) and "My East is Your West" (2014), an animated light installation featuring the words "My East is Your West" illuminated in a nonlinear arrangement.

Gupta has participated in Venice Biennale (2019), Kochi Muziris Biennale (2018), Berlin Biennale (2014), Sharjah Biennial (2013), Lyon Biennale (2009), Gwangju Biennale (2008), Yokohama Triennale (2008) and Liverpool Bienniale (2006) amongst others.

Gupta has had solo exhibitions at Hamburger Bahnhof in Berlin, Bikaner House in New Delhi, Contemporary Arts Center in Cincinnati, Centro Botin in Santander, Barbican in London, Amant Art Center in Brooklyn, Ishara Art Foundation in Dubai, Arnolfini in Bristol, OK Centre for Contemporary Art in Linz, Museum voor Moderne Kunst in Arnhem, Voorlinden Museum in Wassenaar, Lalit Kala Akademi in New Delhi amongst others. In 2021 she had a survey show at the Museum of Contemporary Art in Antwerp curated by Nav Haq.

== Awards and recognition ==
In 2025 she was awarded the Possehl Prize for International Art 2025. Gupta is the third artist to win the prize, which is awarded every three years, following Doris Salcedo and Matt Mullican. In 2024, she was awarded the ‘Path Breakers Award’ by Asia Society. In 2019, Gupta was the recipient of the GQ Cultural Provocateur Award; in 2018, she was named India Today's New Media Artist of the Year;

== Bibliography ==
- Sam Bardaouil, Nancy Adajania and Ulya Soley, Shilpa Gupta: What Still Holds, Edited by Sam Bardaouil and Till Fellrath, Silvana Editoriale Milano, 2026
- Monica Juneja, Sabih Ahmed, Nikita Dhawan, Noura Dirani and Felicitas Hommel, Shilpa Gupta: We last met in the mirror, Edited by Noura Dirani, Hatje Cantz Verlag, 2025
- Alexandra Munroe, Nav Haq and Elvira Dyangani Ose, Shilpa Gupta, Phaidon Press, London, 2023
- Sunil Khilnani and Anushka Rajendran, Shilpa Gupta : Drawing in the Dark, Hatje Cantz , Berlin, 2021
- Chris Bayley, Hilary Floe and Urvashi Butalia, Shilpa Gupta: Sun at Night, Barbican Centre and Ridinghouse, London, 2022
- Nancy Adajania, Peter Weibel, Shanay Jhaveri and Quddus Mirza, Shilpa Gupta, Prestel, 2010
- Shaheen Merali, Nancy Adajania, Hans Ulrich Obrist and Julia Peyton-Jones, Shilpa Gupta: Blind Stars, Stars Blind, Kehrer Heidelberg, Berlin, 2009
