= Indian Radical Painters' and Sculptors' Association =

20th-century Indian art collective

The Indian Radical Painters' and Sculptors' Association, also known as the Radical Painters' and Sculptors' Association, the Kerala Radicals, or the Radical Group, was a group of leftist artists that primarily consisted of Keralites working in Baroda. The group informally originated with the 1985 exhibition Seven Young Sculptors before becoming an active collective of artists who worked and exhibited between 1987 and 1989. The group ended with the suicide of sculptor and leader K. P. Krishnakumar. Other notable artists included K. M. Madhusudhanan, CK Rajan, Alex Mathew,Anita Dube,a non-Keralite member and Radha Gomaty.Other women associated at various times were Rajni Madan Salle and Ayesha Abraham

Heavily influenced by Marxist ideology, the artists emphasized interrogating established aesthetic and political norms while expressing the plight of marginalized and oppressed people. They rejected the revivalism associated with nationalist artists like Abanindranath Tagore and the Bengal School, preferring to use cheap alternative materials like cloth and plaster to reflect the lives of the poor in a postcolonial context. They also rejected the art market and the commodification of art, advocating for a radical, socially conscious form of art.

== History of the Group ==
The Association originated in the small, coastal state of Kerala, a site of Marxist activity in the 1970s and 1980s. At the Trivandrum College of Art, Krishnakumar, Mathew and associates protested the declaration of a State of Emergency in 1975. They advocated for the necessity of politics in art, inspired by the emotionalism and anti-realism of German Expressionism. After Mathew and fellow Trivandram alumni K. M. Madhusudhanan began studying in Baroda, Krishnakumar joined them to continue his pursuit of a Marxist, subversive Indian art. In Baroda, Krishnakumar formed The Radical Painters' and Sculptors'Association, leading its first official exhibition, "Questions and Dialogue". The exhibition directly challenged the Narrative/Figurative Movement popularized by the Baroda School, established by the seminal exhibition "A Place for People." This challenge proved highly controversial, and "Questions and Dialogue" became the last time the Association exhibited in Northern India.

Specifically, "Questions and Dialogue" challenged the Baroda School's ideas about drawing on Indian art history as a resource for contemporary artists. Instead, the group offered a more subversive perspective on Indian art history that acknowledges inequalities between regions, castes, and classes. For example, Krishnakumar's sculpture "Vasco de Gama," inspired by his time in Goa, uses contemporary materials like painted plaster to draw parallels between European colonialism and the emergence of capitalism in twentieth-century India, a contrast to the more idealistic perspective of Geeta Kapur's essay in the "A Place of People" catalogue.

In 1989, the group hosted an art workshop and camp in Alapad, a village in Kerala. With local artists and villagers, they worked on paintings and sculptures and held discussions about art and modernity. After the art camp, the group held a series of meetings in which members heavily criticized the direction of the Association and the leadership of Krishnakumar. After conflicts between members turned violent, the group voted to freeze activity for a year and disband. Humiliated and devastated, Krishnakumar took his own life.

== Influences ==
In addition to being heavily influenced by German Expressionism, the group, especially Krishnakumar, also drew inspiration from Western artists like Pablo Picasso and Auguste Rodin. However, the group did not have a unified, singular aesthetic, but instead drew from a wide variety of sources.

== Gallery ==
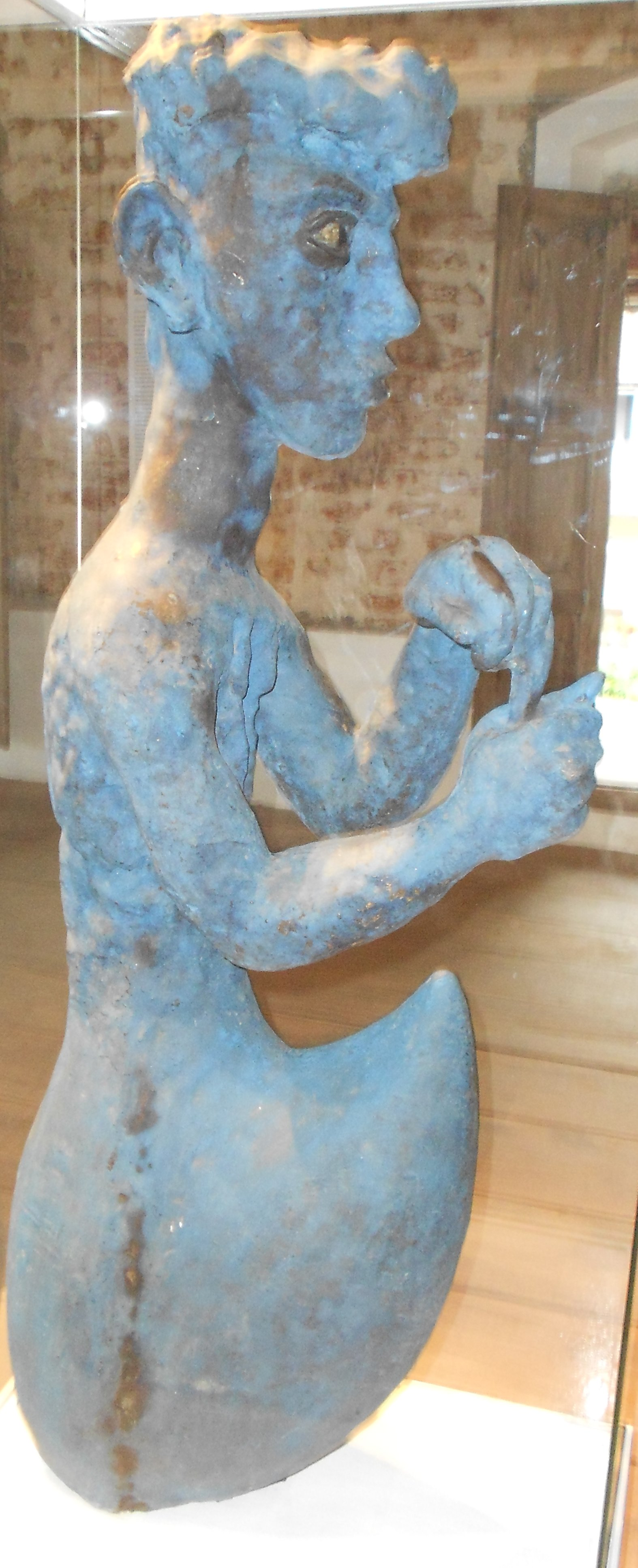
Boatman by K.P. Krishnakumar

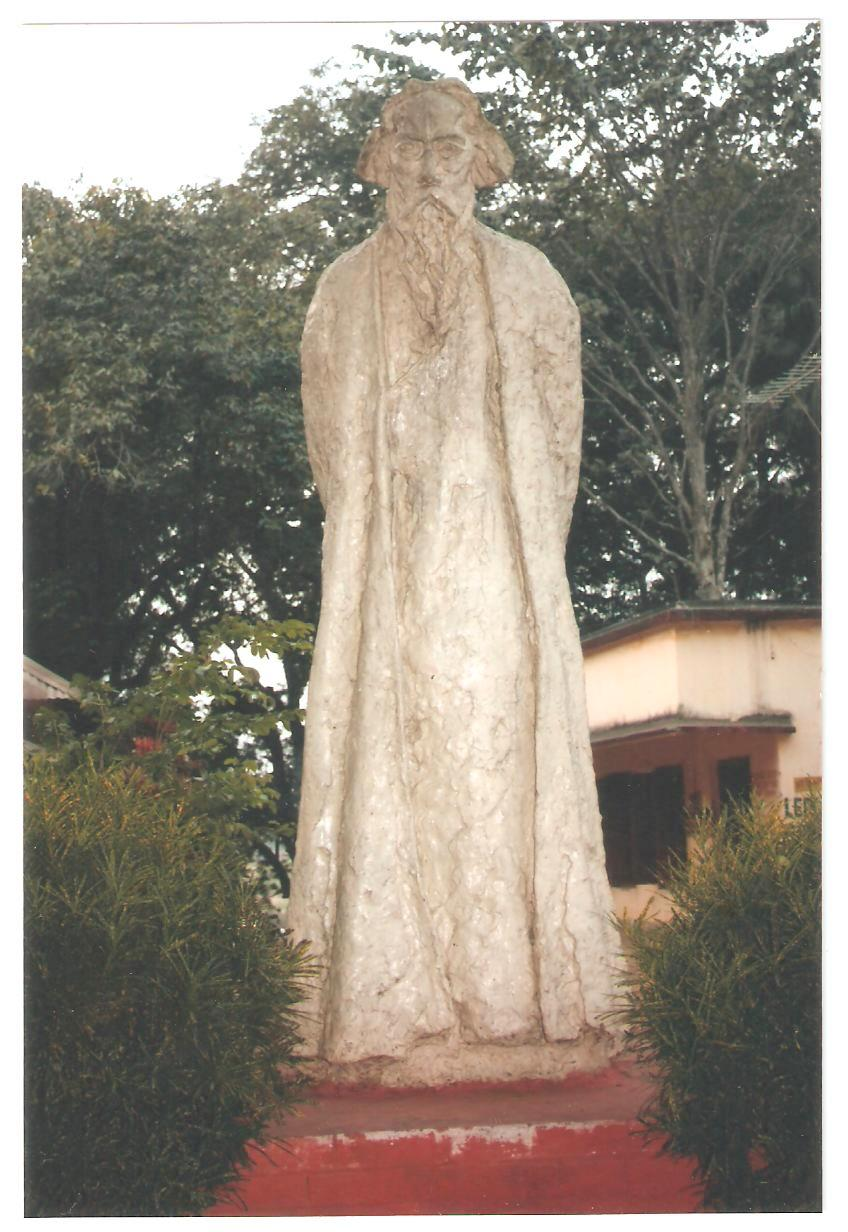
Statue of Rabindranath Tagore by K.P. Krishnakumar

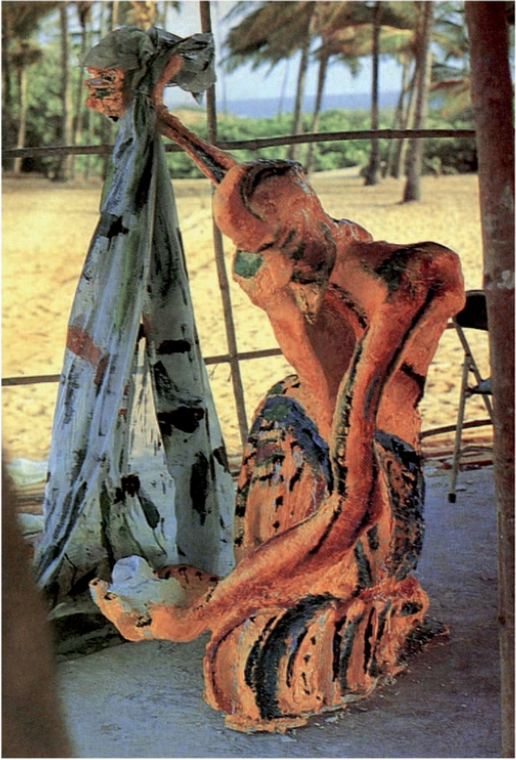
Vasco de Gama by K.P. Krishnakumar

== Exhibitions ==
- Seven Young Sculptors (October 30-November 13, 1985 at the Rabindra Bhavan Galleries, Lalit Kala Akademi, New Delhi, India)

- Questions and Dialogue (March 25–29, 1987 at the Faculty of Fine Arts Gallery, Vadodara, India)

- Alekhya Darshan: Young Sculptors and Painters from India (May 20 - August 20, 1987, Centre d'Art Contemporain, Geneva, Switzerland)

- Artists Against a Reactionary Aesthetic Sensibility (1988, Calicut)
