= Vicky Roy =

Indian photographer

- Born: 1987 (age 38–39); Purulia, West Bengal, India
- Occupation: Photographer
- Notable work: Street Dreams, 2007 HOME.STREET.HOME, 2013 Everyone is Good at Something
- Website: www.vickyroy.com

Vicky Roy (born 1987) is a photographer from Purulia, West Bengal, India.

== Early life ==
At the age of 11, Roy ran away from home to New Delhi He worked as a dishwasher and rag picker at the New Delhi railway station for months until a doctor referred him to the Salaam Balak non-governmental organisation (NGO). In the NGO, Roy met a British photographer who became his inspiration. At the age of 18, the NGO presented a camera to him, and he left after getting an apprenticeship with Anay Mann.

== Career ==
Street Dreams was his first solo photography exhibition in 2007, and was held at the India Habitat Centre in New Delhi. During the 2013 Delhi Photo Festival, the Nazar Foundation released Home Street Home, his first monograph. In 2017, his first solo show was showcased at the Vadehra Art Gallery, titled This Scarred Land: New Mountainscapes. In 2018, he was a part of the Houston FotoFest Biennial and Kochi-Muziris Biennale.

In 2014, he was awarded the MIT Media Fellowship. In 2016, he featured in the Forbes Asia "30 under 30" list. In 2019, he debuted at the Asia Society Texas Center (ASTC) with Scraping the Sky: Photographs by Vicky Roy.
