= Anoli Perera =

- Born: 1962 (age 63–64); Colombo, Sri Lanka
- Occupation: visual artist

Anoli Perera, born in Colombo, Sri Lanka in 1962, is a contemporary visual artist. She incorporates in her work the concept of “bricolage” in which fragments from different written texts, raw materials, objects and painted surfaces are combined to create a textured surface. She is among the 1990s generation of artists who have assumed a new ideological position with reference to the production of contemporary art questioning the social aspects in Sri Lanka in general and art as a medium to question the traditional notions of femininity. She is also the co–founder and one of the directors of the Theertha International Artists Collective, a progressive art initiative based in Colombo. She currently lives and works in Colombo, Sri Lanka and functions as a director of the Millenium Art Contemporary (MiAC), a non-profit company established by another Sri Lankan contemporary artist, Pala Pothupitiya.

== Early life and education ==
Perera has a degree in political science, economics and sociology from the University of Colombo, Sri Lanka. Later, she received a graduate diploma in international affairs.

At the age of 26, she moved to the United States. For three years from 1988 to 1992, she studied art programs at Santa Barbara, California and Princeton, New Jersey. Until 2016, she lived and worked in the province of Rajagiriya in west Sri Lanka, after which she moved to New Delhi.

== Career ==
Anoli Perera has been practising visual art for more than 25 years and has exhibited her art extensively. Some of her solo exhibitions are “The City, Janus–Faced” displayed at Shrine Empire, New Delhi and “Comfort Zones” at Kashi Art café, Kochi. In 2002, she received a Visiting Artist Residency at the University of Wollongong, Australia as well as a residency at the Fukuoka Asian Art Museum, Japan. The same year, she was invited to participate in the Fukuoka Art Triennale. Her work was showcased in art events such as Art Basel (Hong Kong), India Art Fair and Colombo Art Biennale.

=== Style ===
Her works consist mainly of large installations, paintings and sculptures. Recently, she has worked on photo-performances. Her works are composed of feminist expression and craftsmanship, critically viewing women's issues, history, myths and other topics. She describes her work as autobiographical, which defines the materials she selects as indicators of her social context. Currently, she uses clothes, thread, lace and paper as raw materials for her sculptures and installations.
