= Andeel =

Egyptian cartoonist (born 1986)

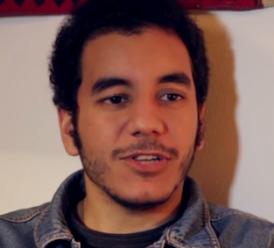
- Born: 1986; Egypt
- Occupation(s): Cartoonist, screenwriter, comedian

Andeel is an Egyptian cartoonist. His work has come into the forefront since the 2011 Egyptian revolution.

== Biography ==
Andeel was born in Kafr al-Sheikh in 1986. Andeel would often visit Cairo with his parents despite not living there. He says he loved Cairo from a young age and decided to move there when he was seventeen years old after he finished high school. His first job was with Al Gael newspaper. A year later, he moved to Al Dostour newspaper where he worked under veteran cartoonist Amr Selim. From there, Andeel moved to another privately owned paper, Al Masry Al Youm, and cofounded its quarterly comics magazine, Tok Tok.

Andeel liked cartoons as a kid. His father showed him the work of Egyptian cartoonist Salah Jaheen, which he says has had a huge impact on his work. Many of the work Andeel was exposed to prior to Jaheen was foreign, so seeing Jaheen’s work about Egypt was a motivating factor to his getting involved in cartooning. Before becoming a prominent cartoonist, however, Andeel tried his luck at script writing and standup comedy.

Most of Andeel's work is based on political satire. His uncle told him that his paternal grandfather was a filmmaker who made a feature film called Horses, which he took to the Berlin Film Festival. Due to racism, it was overlooked for the big prize though it clearly deserved it, and on the boat back to Egypt he threw the only copy of the film overboard and retired from cinema. Knowledge of this outrage compelled Andeel to move to Cairo and become a professional cartoonist at a very early age, as well as making short films (such as “Who Knows?”, a psychedelic film noir set in the wild west), writing TV scripts, designing newspapers, co-founding “Tok Tok” comics magazine, launching “Radhio Kafril Sheikh el Habeeba,” and using Facebook a lot. He is studying for a certificate in social work. In 2012, he got married.
