= Annu Palakunnathu Matthew =

British photographer and academic

Annu Palakunnathu Matthew (born 1964) is a British, Indian and American photographer. Her work has been exhibited at the Rhode Island School of Design Museum; Harvard Art Museums; Guangzhou Biennial of Photography, China; Tang Museum, New York; and The Smithsonian National Museum of Natural History. Matthew is a professor of art (photography) in the University of Rhode Island's Department of Art and Art History.

== Major works and exhibitions ==
- SHELTERED: The Italians who saved the escaped Indian Prisoners of War during World War II
- The Unremembered: Indian Soldiers from the Italian Campaign of World War II
- Open Wound: Stories of Partition
- To Majority Minority
- An Indian From India
- ReGeneration
- Memories of India
- Fabricated Memories
- Bollywood Satirized
- The Virtual Immigrant

== Awards ==
- 2003: John Gutmann Fellowship, The San Francisco Foundation.
- 2007: MacColl Johnson Fellowship in Visual Arts.
- 2009: University of Rhode Island Center for the Humanities Visiting Scholar Grant for the visit of Hasan Elahi, Assistant Professor at the CADRE Laboratory for New Media, School of Art and Design, San Jose State University.
- 2011: University of Rhode Island Center for the Humanities Sabbatical Fellowship for her project “Expanding Re-Generations.”
- 2012: Fulbright Fellowship.
- 2010: Rhode Island State Council of the Arts Fellowship.
- American Institute of Indian Studies Creative Arts fellowship.
- Artist in residence, Yaddo Colony, Saratoga Springs, NY and the MacDowell Colony, Peterborough, NH.
- 2013: Society of Photographic Educators (SPE) Future Focus Project support grant.
- 2013: University of Rhode Island Center for the Humanities Faculty Subvention Grant for her project “Re-Generations-An Open Wound.”
- 2015: Rhode Island State Council on the Arts Fellowship Merit Award in New Genres.
- 2015–2017: Recipient of the Silvia Chandley Professorship in Nonviolence and Peace

== Selected exhibitions ==
Solo:

- Generations, Royal Ontario Museum, Ontario, Canada (2015).
- The Virtual Immigrant, Stockton College, Galloway, NJ (2009).
- The Virtual Immigrant, Tasveer Gallery, Bangalore, India (2009).
- The Virtual Immigrant, Institute of Contemporary Indian Art, Mumbai, India (2011).
- The Virtual Immigrant, Tasveer Gallery, New Delhi, India (2011).
- Re-Generations, Gallery Z20, Rome, Italy (2011).
- Open Wound, University of Rhode Island, Kingston, RI (2014).
- Between Cultures, Lycoming College, PA (2014).
- Bollywood Satirized, Watson Center, Brown University, Providence RI (2014).
- Memória, OÁ Galeria - Arte Contemporânea, Vittoria, Brazil (2014).

Group:

- 37 Still Lives, Design Gallery, National Institute of Design, Ahmedabad, India (2013).
- 40 Artists / 40 Years: Selections from the Light Work Collection, Light Work, Syracuse, Lubin House, NYC (2013).
- A Photograph Is Not An Opinion, Jehangir Art Gallery, Mumbai (2013).
- For Which It Stands, Lodge Gallery, New York, NY (2013).
- Grace, Delhi Photo Festival 2013, India Habitat Center, New Delhi, India (2013).
- Convergence: Contemporary Art from India and the Diaspora, The William Benton Museum of Art, University of Connecticut, Storrs, CT (2013).
- Self, Model, and Self as Other, The Museum of Fine Art, Houston, TX (2013).
- The First 15: Photography from the Meredith S. Moody Residency at Yaddo, Tang Teaching Museum, Saratoga Springs, NY (2013).
- Home Truths: Motherhood, Photography and Loss, Foundling Museum, London, England (2013).
- The Other and Me, Sharjah Art Museum, Sarjah, UAE (2014).
- Conversation XVII: Photographic Memory, Spencer Art Museum, Lawrence, KS (2014).
- Forty Years of Blue Sky, Portland Art Museum, Portland, OR (2014).
- Postdate: Photography and Inherited History in India, San Jose Museum of Art, San Jose, CA (2015).
- Beyond Bollywood Indian-Americans Shape the Nation, Smithsonian National Museum of Natural History, Washington DC (2015).
- Postdate: Photography and Inherited History in India, Ulrich Museum of Art, Wichita, KS (2015).
- Re Present: Photography from South Asia, Kamloops Art Gallery, Kamloops, British Columbia, Canada (2018).
