= K. P. Krishnakumar =

Indian artist (1958–1989)

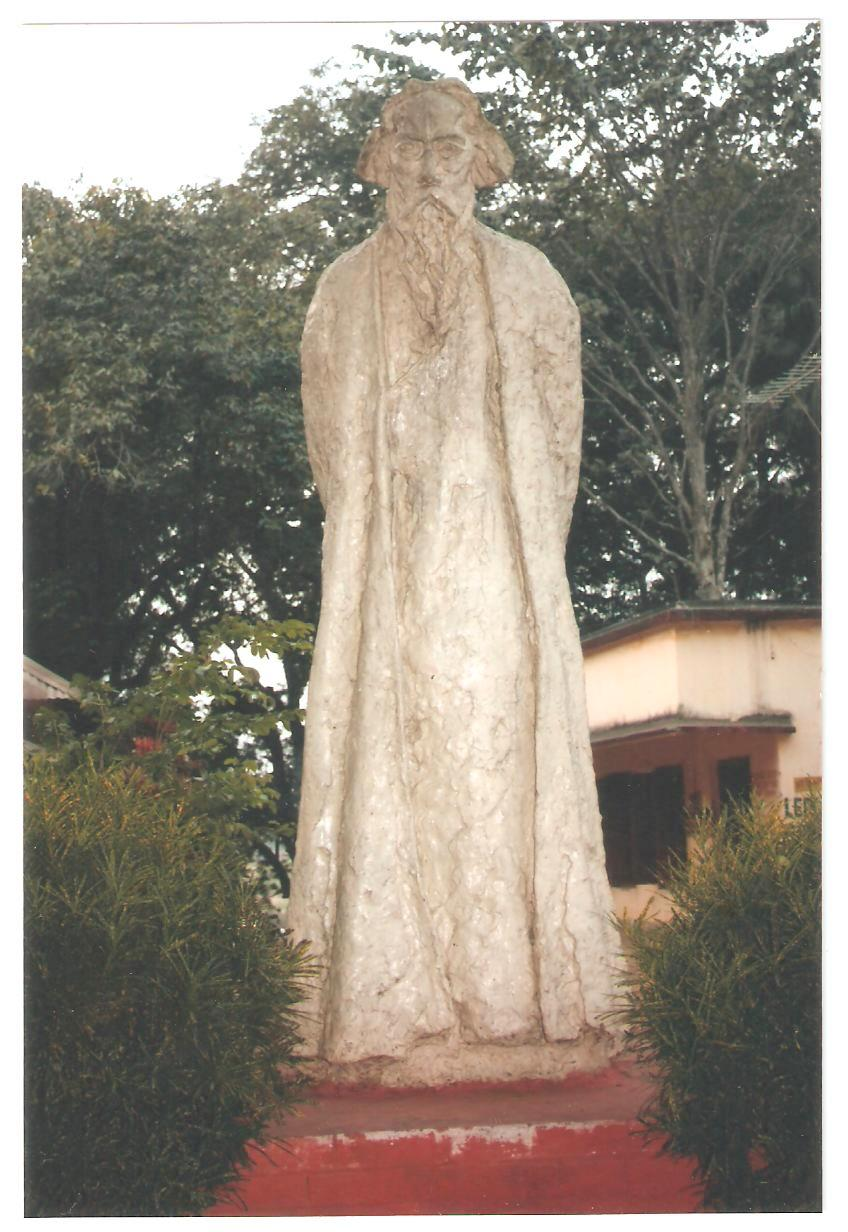
Statue of Rabindranath Tagore by K. P. Krishnakumar at Amar Kutir

K. P. Krishnakumar (1958 – 26 December 1989) was an Indian sculptor and painter.

== Life ==
Krishnakumar was born in Kuttippuram, Kerala. He attended Visva-Bharati University.

Krishnakumar helped to lead the Indian Radical Painters' and Sculptors' Association, which ceased to exist following his death.

He committed suicide on 26 December 1989.

== Art ==
Krishnakumar's oeuvre includes a number of figures of young men, which Jhaveri suggests are self-portraits. Wyma argues that his Vasco da Gama (1985) explores themes of colonialism. He was influenced by Pablo Picasso, Auguste Rodin, and director Jean-Luc Godard.

Krishnakumar was exhibited at the Kochi-Muziris Biennale in 2013.

== Sources ==
- Jhaveri, Shanay (June 2014). "Mutable Bodies: K.P. Krishnakumar and the Radical Association". Afterall: A Journal of Art, Context and Enquiry. 36: 54–63. doi:10.1086/678339. ISSN 1465-4253.
- Wyma, Kathleen Lynne (2007). The Discourse and Practice of Radicalism in Contemporary Indian Art 1960–1990 (PhD thesis). University of British Columbia.
