= Riyas Komu =

Indian Multimedia artist

- റിയാസ് കോമു
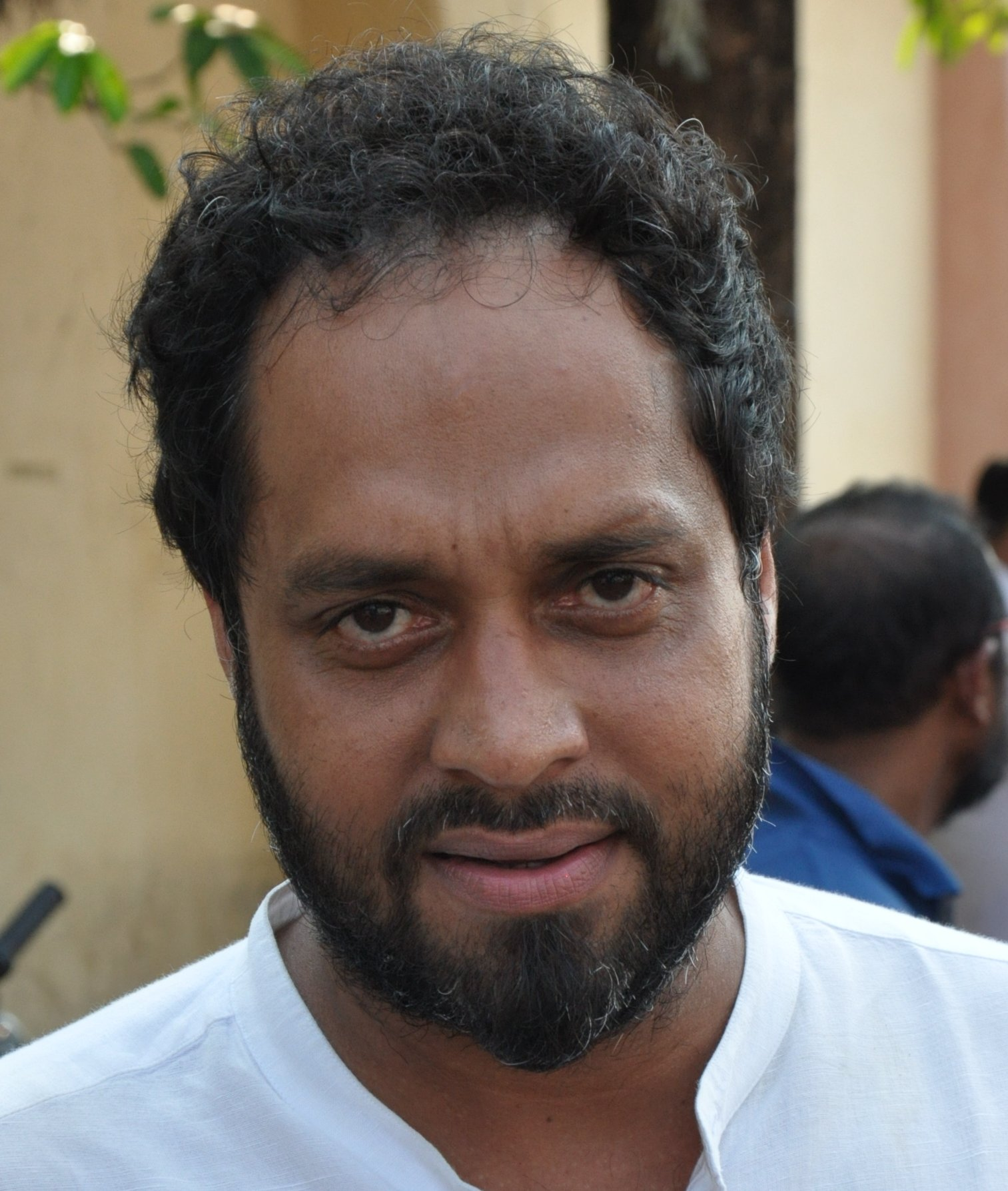
- Born: 1971 (age 55); Thrissur, Kerala, India
- Education: Sir J. J. School of Art, Mumbai
- Occupations: Sculptor; Painter; Curator

Riyas Komu is an Indian multimedia artist and curator based in Mumbai. He has invested his time in art education and developing art infrastructure in India. Komu's works are inspired by social conflicts and political movements and topics like migration and displacement. His hyper-realistic oil portraits of people resemble socialist-realist propaganda art, with one of his portraits titled Why Everybody should Look Like Mao.

In 2007, Komu was one of two artists from India selected for the 52nd Venice Biennale by curator Robert Storr. Later, he went on to represent the Iranian Pavilion at the Venice Biennale in 2015. Komu also participated in the Jogja Biennale, Indonesia, 2011.

== Early life ==
Riyas completed his Bachelors & Masters in Painting from the Sir J. J. School of Art in Mumbai in 1999. He is the Ideator of Kochi- Muziris Biennale and co-founder of Kochi-Muziris Biennale Foundation that established in 2010. He co-curated the first edition of Kochi-Muziris Biennale in 2012 and has been the Director of Programmes of the Kochi Biennale Foundation in the year of 2012, 2014 and 2016 and in this capacity, he has initiated the Students' Biennale, Children's Biennale (later named as ABC, Art by Children), Artists Cinema, Music of Muziris, Video Lab, Let's Talk series & History Now like Talks and Seminars, Pepper House Residency & Exhibition

== Initiatives ==
Riyas been the Advisor and Visual Arts Curator for Serendipity Arts Festival in Goa in 2016 & 2017 and he has done extensive research trips in sub-continent and conceptualized and curated the 'Young Sub-Continent' project in 2016, 17 & 18 in Goa. He also curated the Kondotty Sufi Festival in 2019. In 2016 he started URU Art Harbour, a cultural hub in Mattancherry, Kochi, (Kerala) and curated shows which promote artists from the region focusing on Local Culture, Kerala's history of social action, Human migration and Maritime History. Uru Art Harbour also provides a well-supported artist in residency which includes exhibition and also engages with international artists. Komu co-curated first International Football Film Festival in India at Goa International Film Festival and Trivandrum International Film Festival in 2012. As an artist, he has many solo shows to his credit which includes, Faith Accompli, Mark Him, Related List, Safe to Light, Holy Shiver & Out of Place. Komu's works have been exhibited globally including South Africa, Brazil, France, Germany, UK, Italy, Korea, Indonesia, Pakistan, Bangladesh, Sri Lanka, USA, China, UAE, Belgium, The Netherlands and Iran among others.

== Amphibian Aesthetics ==
In Amphibian Aesthetics, Riyas Komu, as the artistic director, extends the exhibition into a critical and dialogic space where art becomes an act of cultural negotiation. His intervention situates the works within a broader discourse that engages with memory, displacement, and the politics of representation, particularly in the context of Kochi’s layered histories. Through this vision, Komu does not merely assemble Midhun Mohan’s works but activates them—transforming the exhibition into a living archive where suppressed narratives and marginalized spiritual histories are given renewed presence. In alignment with the ethos of Aazhi Archives. Riyas frames Amphibian Aesthetics as a site of resistance and continuity, where artistic practice becomes a medium to question erasure and reimagine belonging. The curatorial approach is one that embraces the amphibian metaphor not just as an aesthetic idea, but as an ethical stance, one that inhabits thresholds, allowing multiple histories, beliefs, and identities to coexist, collide, and speak across time.

== Exhibitions ==
- 2011

Inde, Centre Pompidou, Paris, France
Contemporary Art from India, Helsinki Art Museum – The Tennis Palace, Helsinki, Finland

- 2010

INSIDE INDIA, Palazzo Saluzzo di Paesana, Turin, Italy
Midnight's Children, Studio la Città, Verona, Italy
Beyond Globalization, Beyond Art Space, Beijing, China
Subrato to Cesar by Riyas Komu, Gallery Maskara, Maskara, Mumbai, India (solo)
Safe to Light, Azad Art Gallery, Tehran, Iran (solo)

- 2009

Beyond Globalization, Beyond Art Space, Beijing, China
Arco Art Fair, Madrid, Spain
Threshold: Forging Narratives in South Asian Contemporary Art, Aicon Gallery, New York City
Indian Popular Culture and beyond Alcala' 31, Madrid, Spain
Sakshi Art Gallery, Mumbai, India (solo)

- 2008

Bodhi Berlin, Berlin, Germany (solo)
MARK HIM (Second half), Gallery 88, Kolkata, India (solo)
The Ghost of Souza, inaugural show in Bowery space, Aicon Gallery, New York City
India Crossing, Studio la Città, Verona, Italy
Frontlines: Notations from the Contemporary Indian Urban, Bodhi Berlin, Berlin, Germany

- 2007–2008

India Arte Oggi, Spazio Oberdan, Milan, Italy

- 2007

FRAME/GRID/ROOM/CELL, curated by Gayatri Sinha, Bodhi Art, Mumbai, India
Art Amsterdam, Amsterdam, the Netherlands
I Fear, I believe, I desire, Gallery Espace, New Delhi, India
Other, AICON Gallery, London, UK
Annual show, Sakshi Gallery, Mumbai, India
52 International Art Exhibition, Venice Biennale, Venice, Italy
Think with the Senses – Feel with the Mind. Art in the Present Tense, 52nd International Art Exhibition, Venice Biennale
MARK HIM (First half), The Guild Art Gallery, Mumbai, India (solo)

- 2006

Systematic Citizen, Palette Art Gallery, New Delhi, India (solo)
Faith Accompli, Sakshi Gallery, Mumbai, India (solo)
Bronze, sculpture show, Rabindra Bhavan, New Delhi, India
Art on the beach. Made by Indians, Plage de Pamplonne, Ramatuelle, St. Tropez, France
On Difference #2, Kunstverein, Stuttgart, Germany
Singapore Art Fair, Singapore
Enrico Navarra, Paris, France
Red Earth And The Pouring Rain, Lanxess ABS Gallery, Baroda, India
Viart, New Delhi, India
Strangeness, Anant Art Gallery, Kolkatta, India

- 2005

Span, Sakshi Gallery, Mumbai, India
Endless Terrain, Lalit Kala Academy, Rabindra Bhavan, New Delhi, India
Double-Enders, Jehangir Art Gallery and Museum Art Gallery, Mumbai, India
Present Future, National Gallery of Modern Art, Mumbai, India
Configurations, Anant Art Gallery, New Delhi, India
Are we like this only?, Rabindra Bhavan, New Delhi, India
Whose space is it anyway?, Gallery Espace, New Delhi, India
Mannat Jali, Marine Drive, Mumbai, India
Public Art Project, Gallery Chemould, Mumbai, India
World Social Forum, Porto Alegre, Brazil
KAAM, Aicon Gallery, New York and Palo Alto
The Third Day, Lalit Kala Academy, Rabindra Bhavan, New Delhi presented by Sakshi Gallery, Mumbai, India (solo)
GRASS, photography show, The Guild Art Gallery, Mumbai, India (solo)

- 2004

Group show during VASL Residency, Karachi, Pakistan
Bombay Boys, Palette Art Gallery, New Delhi, India
A New Mediatic Realism, Bayer ABS Gallery, Baroda, India
Generation I, Saffron Art Gallery, Mumbai, India
Mumbai x 17, Kashi Art Gallery, Cochin, India
Anticipations, Jehangir Art Gallery and Museum Art Gallery, Mumbai, India
RED, Palette Art Gallery, New Delhi, India

- 2003

Sarasu, Guild Art Gallery, Mumbai, India (solo)
Unconditional, Sakshi Gallery, Mumbai, India (solo)
Hilights, Sakshi Gallery, Mumbai, India
2D/3D, Visual Art Center, Hong Kong
Ideas and Images, National Gallery of Modern Art, Mumbai, India
Art for Art/Switzerland meets India, Kalaghoda Art Festival, Mumbai, India
Crossing Generations :Diverge, 40 years of Gallery Chemould, National Gallery of Modern Art, Mumbai, India
Sarasu, photography show on Raja Ravi Verma Press, The Guild Art Gallery, Mumbai, India (solo)
UNCONDITIONAL, Sakshi Gallery, Mumbai, India (solo)

- 2002–2003

AMBULANCE, Renaissance Art Gallery, Bangalor, Indiae (solo)
Ambulance, Renaissance Art Gallery, Bangalore, India (solo)

- 2002

Asian Art Festival, Singapore
Harmory Shows (2004–1999), Nehru Center, Mumbai, India
Tribute to Picasso, Guild Art Gallery, Mumbai, India
Ways of Resisting 1992– 2002, Sahmat/ Rabindra Bhavan, New Delhi, India
Creative Space, Sakshi Gallery and India Habitat Center, New Delhi, India
Words and Images, Guild Art Gallery and National Gallery of Modern Art, Mumbai, India
Creative Space, Sakshi Gallery and India Habitat Center, New Delhi, India
Harmory Shows (2004–1999), Nehru Center, Mumbai, India
New Delhi Crosscurrents, Jehangir Art Gallery, Mumbai, India
Engendering Images of Women, Art Gallery, Mumbai, India
Excerpts from my diary, Fine Art Company, Mumbai, India
The Human Factor, Jehangir Art Gallery, Mumbai, India

- 2000

Mumbai Metaphor, Tao Art Gallery, Mumbai, India
Mumbai Metaphor, Tao Art Gallery, Mumbai, India
Exile Longings, Lakeeren Art Gallery, Mumbai, India
Memos of the New Millennium – Artists from the Moulting World, Birla Academy of Art & Culture, Mumbai, India
Ideas and Images, National Gallery of Modern Art, Mumbai, India
Moulting World, Birla Academy of Art & Culture, Mumbai

- 1999

Critics Choice, Ideas and Images, National Gallery of Modern Art, Mumbai, India

- 1998

He used to believe that EMS planted coconut tree in Kerala, installation, Sir J.J. School of Art, Mumbai, India

== Awards ==
- K. K. Hebbar Foundation Society Scholarship 1997 to 1999
- Bombay Art Society Award 1996
- Maharashtra State Art Prize 1995
- 'Critic's Choice' at NGMA 1999
