= Bose Krishnamachari =

Indian painter

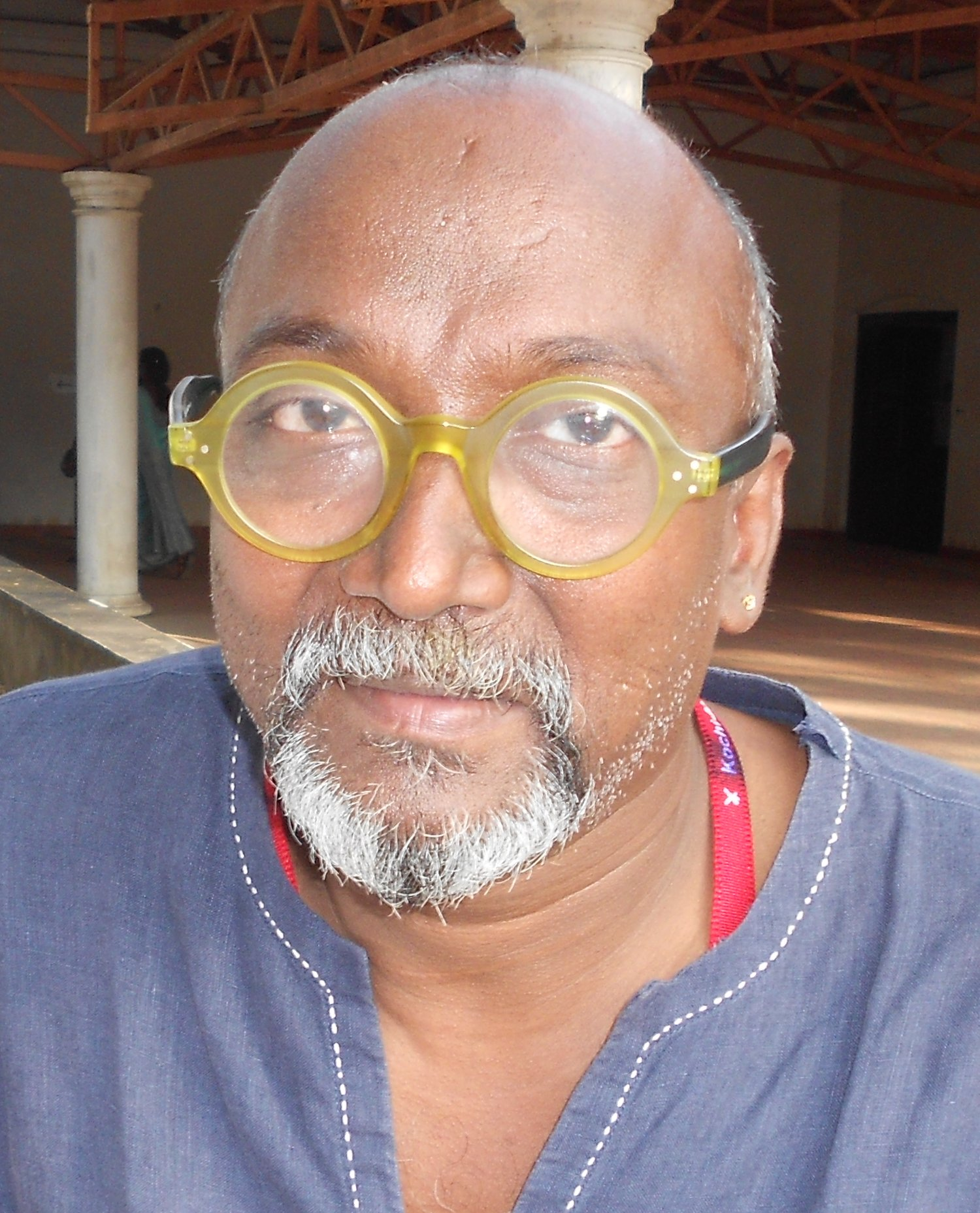
- Born: 1963 (age 63); Angamaly, Ernakulam, Kerala, India
- Education: Sir J. J. School of Art, Mumbai (Bachelor of Fine Arts); Goldsmiths' College, University of London (Master of Fine Arts)
- Occupations: Painter; Curator
- Awards: Kerala Lalithakala Akademi (1985); British Council Travel Award (1993); Mid-America Arts Alliance Award (1996); Charles Wallace India Trust Award (1999–2000); Life Time Fellowship Award- Kerala Lalithakala Akademi

Bose Krishnamachari (born 1963) is an Indian painter and art curator based in Mumbai, India.

== Biography ==
Krishnamachari was born in 1963 in the village of Mangattukara, near Angamaly, Kerala. He attended the Government Higher Secondary School in Puliyanam, before going on to complete a Bachelor of Fine Arts from Sir J. J. School of Art in Mumbai in 1991, and a Master of Fine Arts from Goldsmiths' College, University of London in 2000.

Bose is a founder member and President of the Kochi-Muziris Biennale. He has lived and worked in Mumbai since 1985.

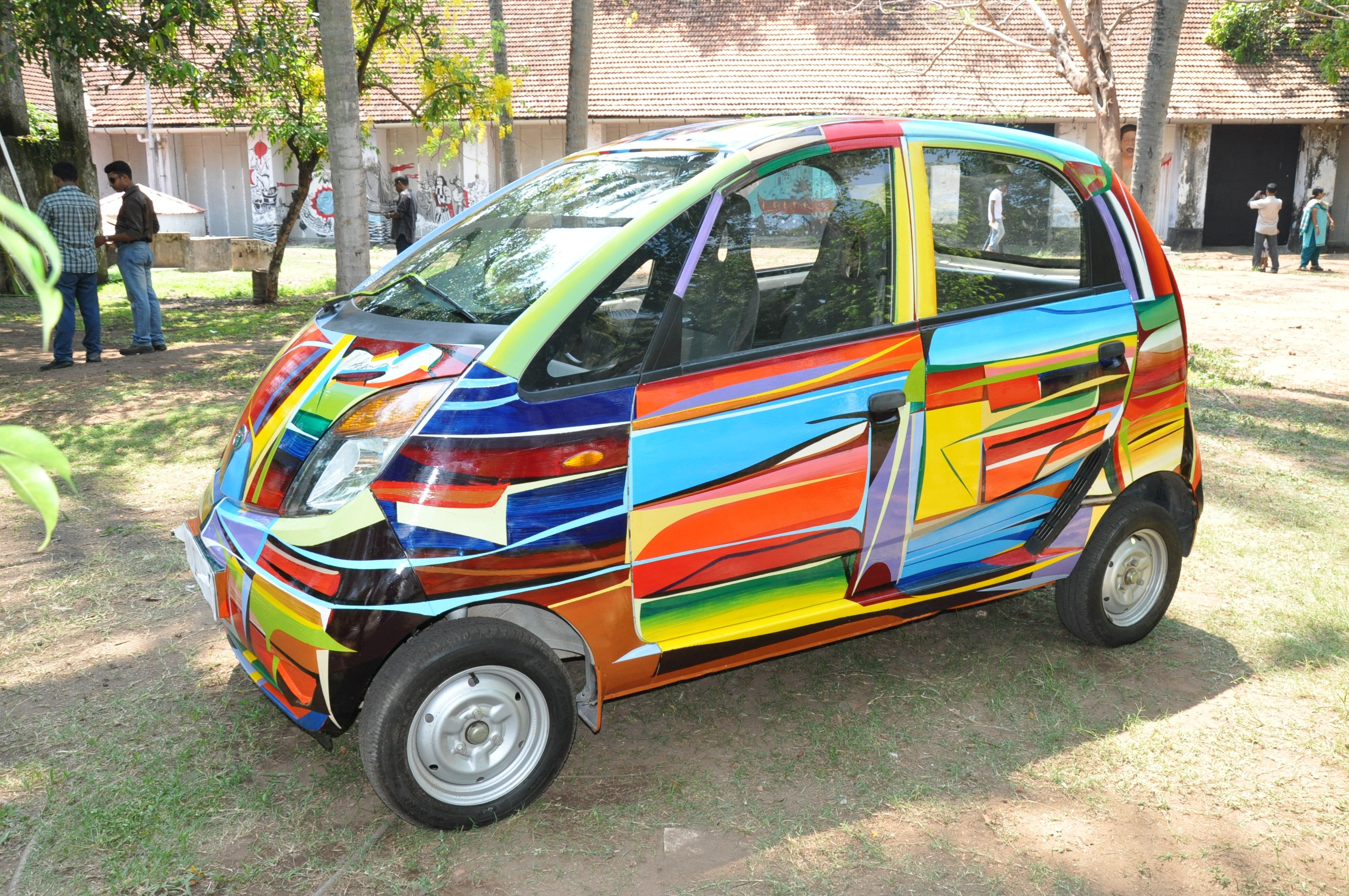
'Maximum Nano', the India's first 'Art Car' by Bose Krishnamachari

== Awards and honours ==
- 1985 Kerala Lalithakala Akademi Award
- 1993 British Council Travel Award
- 1996 Mid-America Arts Alliance Award for Travel and Residency in the United States
- 1999–2000 Charles Wallace India Trust Award
- 2001 First runner up for the Bose Pacia Prize for Modern Art, New York
- 2009 Guest of Honor at ARCO, Madrid, and curated the India Pavilion
- 2023 Included by Art Review magazine in a list of the world's most influential personalities in the field of art.
