= Kochi-Muziris Biennale =

International art exhibition held in Indian city, Kochi

Kochi-Muziris Biennale കൊച്ചി-മുസിരിസ് ദ്വൈവാര്‍ഷിക കലാപ്രദര്‍ശനം
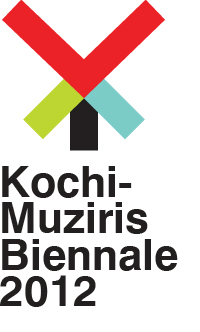
- Logo of the Kochi-Muziris Biennale
- Genre: International Art Exhibition (Contemporary art)
- Begins: 12 December 2025
- Ends: 31 March 2026
- Locations: Kochi, Kerala, India
- Founded: 2012; 14 years ago
- Attendance: 600,000 (2016–17)
- People: Nikhil Chopra (Curator); Bose Krishnamachari (Co-founder & President of KBF)
- Website: www.kochimuzirisbiennale.org

The Kochi-Muziris Biennale is an international exhibition of contemporary art held in the city of Kochi in Kerala, India. It is the largest art exhibition in the country and the biggest contemporary art festival in Asia. The Kochi-Muziris Biennale is an initiative of the Kochi Biennale Foundation with support from the Government of Kerala. The concept of the Kochi-Muziris Biennale was ideated and executed by Venu Vasudevan, IAS, who was the Government of Kerala's cultural secretary. The exhibition is set across Kochi, with shows being held in existing galleries, halls, and site-specific installations in public spaces, heritage buildings and vacant structures.

Indian and international artists exhibit artwork across a variety of mediums, including film, installation, painting, sculpture, new media and performance art. The Kochi-Muziris Biennale tried to invoke the legacy of the modern metropolis of Kochi and its mythical predecessor, the ancient port of Muziris.

Alongside the exhibition, the Biennale offers a program of talks, seminars, screenings, music, workshops and educational activities for schoolchildren and students.

== History ==
In May 2010, Mumbai-based contemporary artists of Kerala origin, Bose Krishnamachari and Riyas Komu, were approached by the then culture minister of Kerala, M. A. Baby, to start an international art project in the state. Acknowledging the lack of an international platform for contemporary art in India, Bose and Riyas proposed the idea of a Biennale (a large scale international exhibition) in Kochi on the lines of the Venice Biennale.

== Kochi Biennale Foundation ==
The Kochi Biennale Foundation (KBF) is a nonprofit charitable trust engaged in promoting art and culture in India, with the Kochi-Muziris Biennale as its primary focus. KBF was founded in 2010 by artists Bose Krishnamachari and Riyas Komu.

== List of Past Biennales ==
- 2012 - WMB (The World is Bound with a Chain of Gold), curated by Bose Krishnamachari and Riyas Komu
- 2014 - Whorled Explorations, curated by Jitish Kallat
- 2016 - Forming in the Pupil of an Eye, curated by Sudarshan Shetty
- 2018 - Possibilities of a Non-Alienated Life, curated by Anita Dube
- 2022 - In Our Veins Flow Ink and Fire, curated by Shubigi Rao
- 2025 - For the Time Being, curated by Nikhil Chopra and HH Art Spaces
- 2027 (scheduled) - to be curated by Kader Attia

== 1st Kochi-Muziris Biennale, 2012 ==
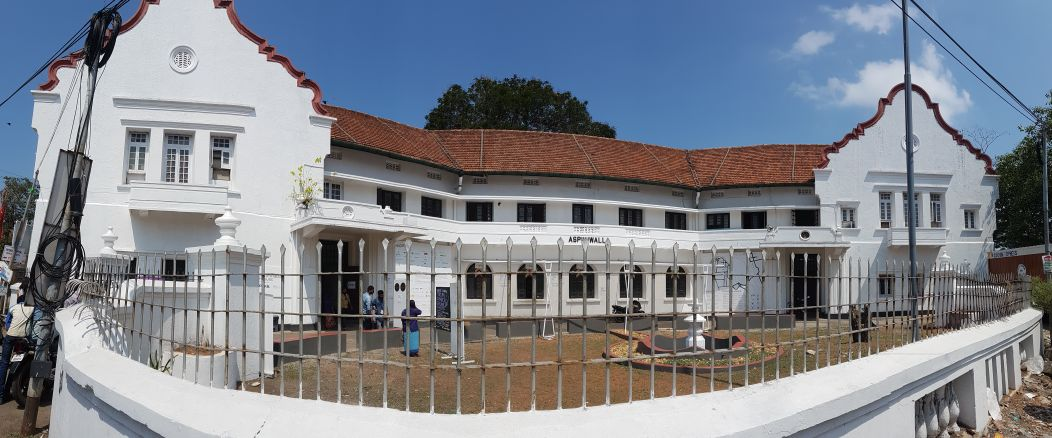
Aspinwall House, one of the main venues of the biennale

The First Kochi-Muziris Biennale began on 12 December 2012. The Biennale hosted 80 artists, with nearly 50 percent foreign artists, site-specific works and an education programme in the three months. The Aspinwall House exhibits the works of 44 artists.

The entry was free until 23 December 2012, which was then replaced by a ticketed entry at ₹50. According to artistic director Bose Krishnamachari, support has come in many forms. Shalini and Sanjay Passi held an ₹25,000-per-head dinner in the capital to raise funds, raising ₹550,000 (US$5,700). Google met with the foundation and has offered help with the website, which received 7.5 million hits in the first month. The Jindals of Jindal Steel and Power Limited, the late Kerala Congress leader T.M. Jacob, R. K. Krishna Kumar of Tata group, Jayanta Matthews of Malayala Manorama and the businessman Shibu Mathai have all donated.

The sites for the Kochi-Muziris Biennale were:

1. Aspinwall House
2. David Hall
3. Pepper House
4. Moidu's Heritage
5. Durbar Hall
6. Cabral Yard
7. Parade Ground
8. Fort Kochi beach
9. Kashi Art Gallery
10. Jew Town Road Godown
11. Rose Street Bungalow
12. Cochin Club
13. Gallery OED
14. David Horvitz

== 2nd Kochi-Muziris Biennale, 2014 ==
The second edition of the biennale cost about ₹17 crore, slightly up from the ₹16.5 crore spent on the first edition. The Kerala government's contribution fell to ₹3 crore from ₹9 crore despite pleas for financial assistance. The organisers relied on sponsorship and online crowd funding to meet the expenses. The number of visitors grew to five lakhs in the second edition, an increase of one lakh from the first edition.

== Partnerships ==
In March 2015, the Kochi Muziris Biennale Foundation partnered with Centre for Public Policy Research, Cochin, for the first Urban Space Dialogue in Kochi to advocate for the need for creating urban spaces in Kochi. The Dialogue featured Nuru Karim, Raj Cherubal, Dhanuraj, Jitish Kallat, Bose Krishnamachary and Riyas Komu.

== 3rd Kochi-Muziris Biennale, 2016 ==
The third edition of the Kochi Muziris Biennale opened on 12 December 2016 and was curated by Sudarshan Shetty. The Biennale was visited by more than six lakh people in its third edition. The exhibition was concurrently staged at 12 venues and featured 97 works as well as 20 events. Sudarshan was declared curator of the 2016 Kochi-Muzirs Biennale by the Minister for Culture, K. C. Joseph, at an event in the state capital, Thiruvananthapuram, on 15 July 2015. He was unanimously chosen as curator by an Artistic Advisory Committee appointed by the Kochi Biennale Foundation for the third edition. The Committee comprised artists Amar Kanwar, Atul Dodiya, Bharti Kher and Jyothi Basu, art critic Ranjit Hoskote, patron Kiran Nadar, gallerist Shireen Gandhy along with KBF trustees Sunil V, Riyas Komu and Bose Krishnamachari.

Sudarshan Shetty's works have been exhibited in solo and group shows in India and abroad, including at the Gwangju Biennale (2000), Tate Modern, London (2001), Fukuoka Asian Art Museum (2001), Centre Pompidou, Paris (2011), Guggenheim Museum, New York (2010) and Kochi-Muziris Biennale (2012).

== 4th Kochi-Muziris Biennale, 2018 ==
The fourth edition of the Kochi-Muziris Biennale opened on 12 December 2018 and was curated by Indian artist Anita Dube.

== 5th Kochi-Muziris Biennale, 2022 ==
In May 2019, it was announced that Singaporean artist and writer Shubigi Rao would curate the fifth edition of the Kochi-Muziris Biennale from December 2020 to April 2021. Rao had previously exhibited at the fourth Kochi-Muziris Biennale in 2018, the sole Singaporean representative. Titled "In our Veins Flow Ink and Fire", the first announced artist list involved 25 participating artists and collectives, featuring names such as Arpita Singh, Decolonizing Architecture Art Residency, Iman Issa, Joan Jonas, Melati Suryodarmo, Samson Young, Slavs and Tatars, Thảo Nguyên Phan and Yinka Shonibare.

Both Kochi-Muziris Biennale founder Bose Krishnamachari and Shubigi Rao would be jointly featured on the 2019 edition of the ArtReview Power 100 list for their work on the Biennale.

"In Our Veins Flow Ink and Fire" finally opened on 23 December 2022 after being postponed twice due to COVID-19 and then again the night before the opening on 11 December 2022 due to "organisational challenges." 53 artists signed an open letter to the Biennale Foundation detailing the organisational shortcomings and exhorting the Board and Advisors to make structural changes later.

== 6th Kochi-Muziris Biennale, 2025 ==
The sixth edition was curated by Nikhil Chopra with HH Art Spaces. It opened on 12 December 2025 with 66 artist projects from more than 25 countries.

== 7th Kochi-Muziris Biennale, scheduled for 2027 ==
7th Kochi-Muziris Biennale is scheduled to open in December 2027, to be curated by Kader Attia.

== Reactions and controversies ==
According to Tate Modern, Kochi-Muziris Biennale was the best biennale they had ever seen. The biennale accrued 150,000 visitors in its first month and 250,000 visitors in its second, averaging a thousand visitors a day (as high as 5,000 daily and 10,000 on weekends, early January). McKinsey and companies have expressed their interest in studying the Biennale to know its economic effects. According to Karthyayani G. Menon, director of Jehangir Art Gallery—Mumbai, Baroda or Kolkata had not been at the forefront of artists—she hoped that the biennale would make a change to that situation.

Many eminent artists in Kerala raised concern over the alleged lack of transparency in the way the funds were spent by the Kochi-Muziris Biennale foundation. Many contemporary artists from the state of Kerala had come out in support of the event, as it could help preserve the image of Kochi.

During the 2016 demonetization of the Indian economy, during the official opening, the government of Kerala promised $1.1 million in funding and support for a permanent venue for the biennale. Chief Minister Pinarayi Vijayan, who is the leader of the Left Democratic Front government and long-time secretary of the Communist Party of India (Marxist) in the state, said that the Biennale matched Kochi's multi-layered history of settlement by Arabs, Chinese, Jews, Portuguese, Dutch, English and different migrant communities from India. Vijayan announced ₹7.5 crore in funding for the Biennale, the highest sum a state government in India had ever given an art event. The government would support a permanent venue for the "mega-prestigious" event.

The fifth edition of the Biennale was mismanaged by the organisers, leading to a last-minute postponement that left visitors stranded. The Biennale has also faced accusations of modern slavery, including non-payment of wages and non-attribution of workers' contributions to artworks.

== Gallery from past editions ==
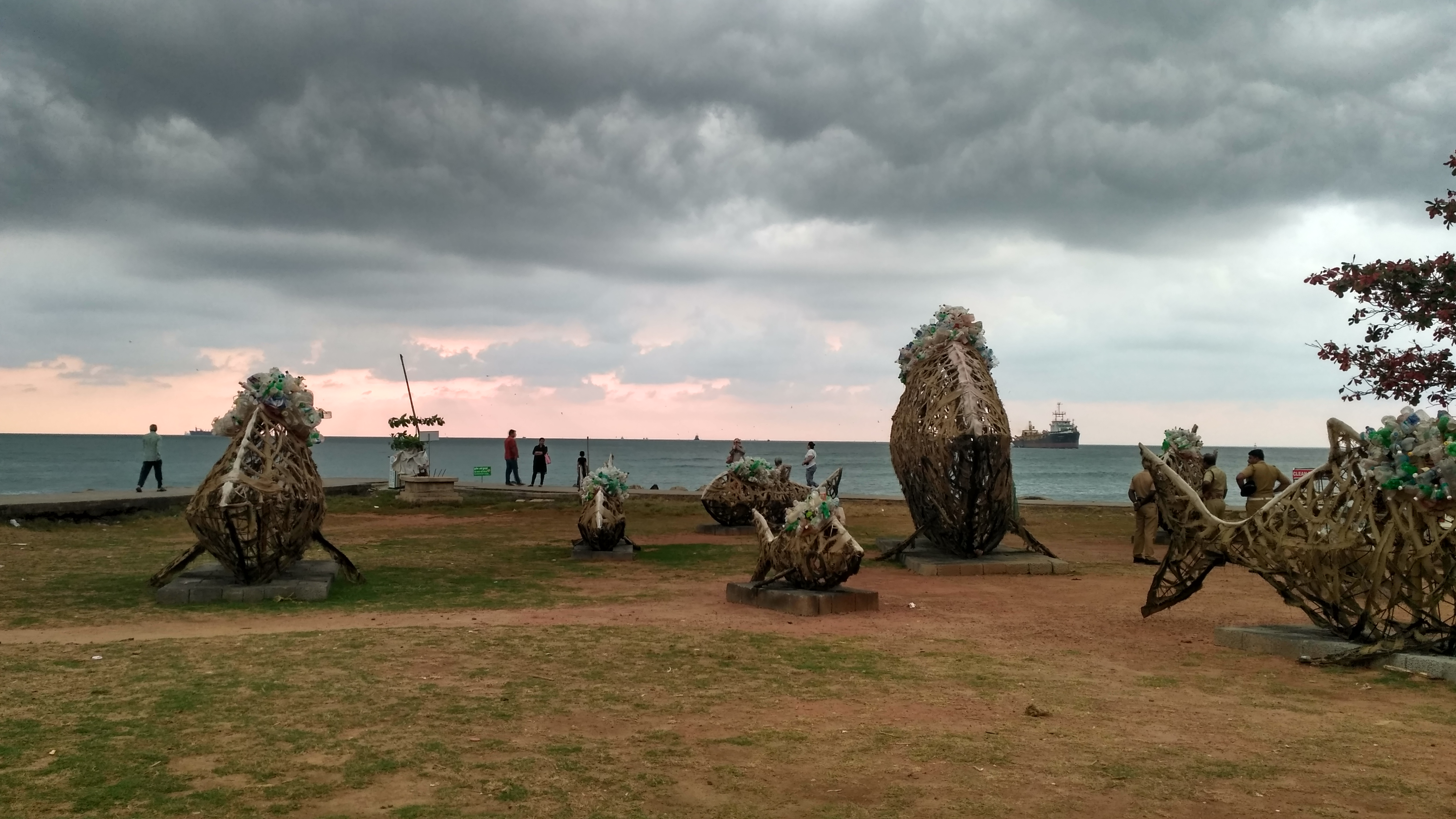
"Fish cemetery" by the Central Marine Fisheries Research Institute

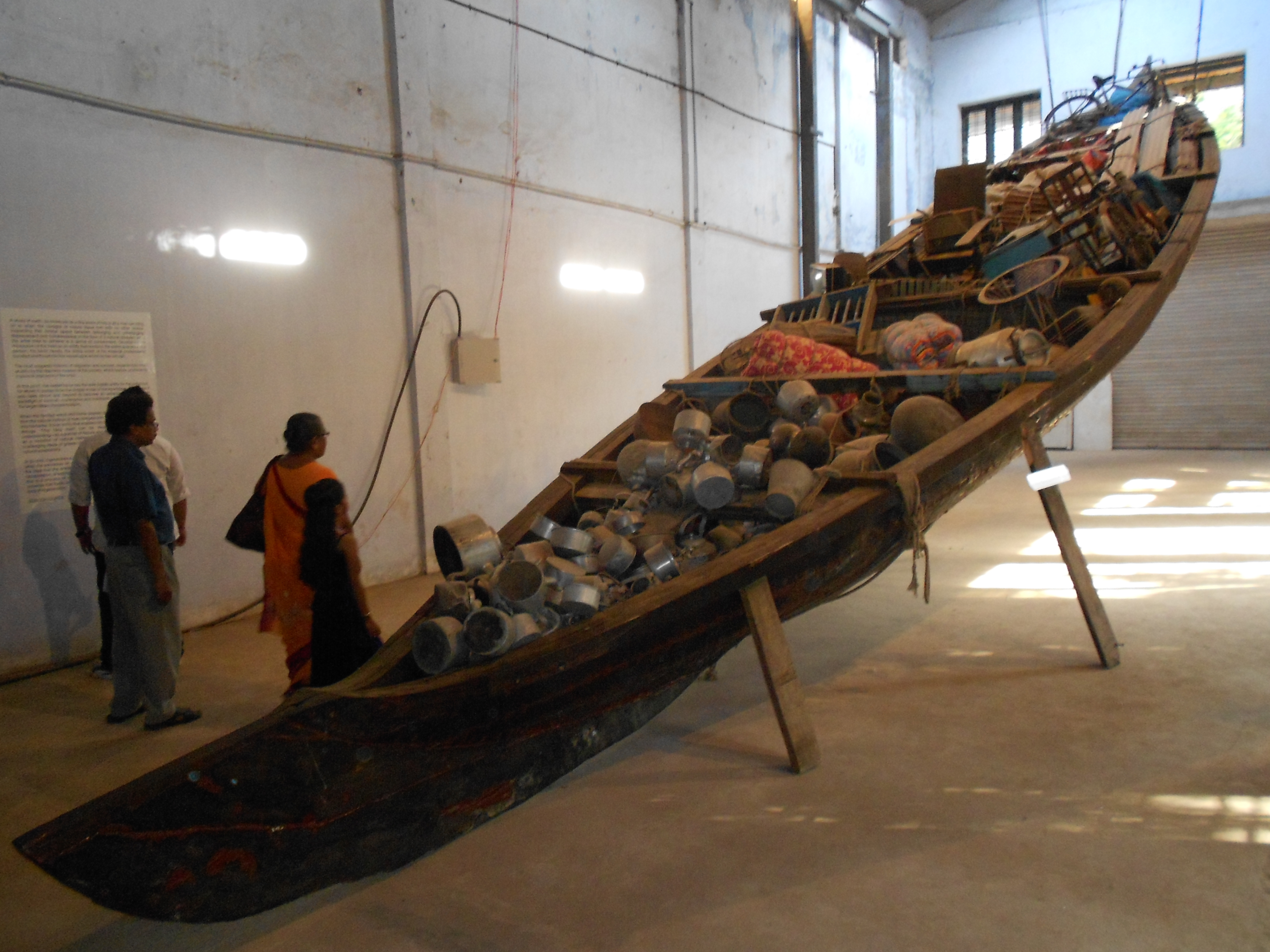
"What does the vessel contain, that the river does not" by Subodh Gupta

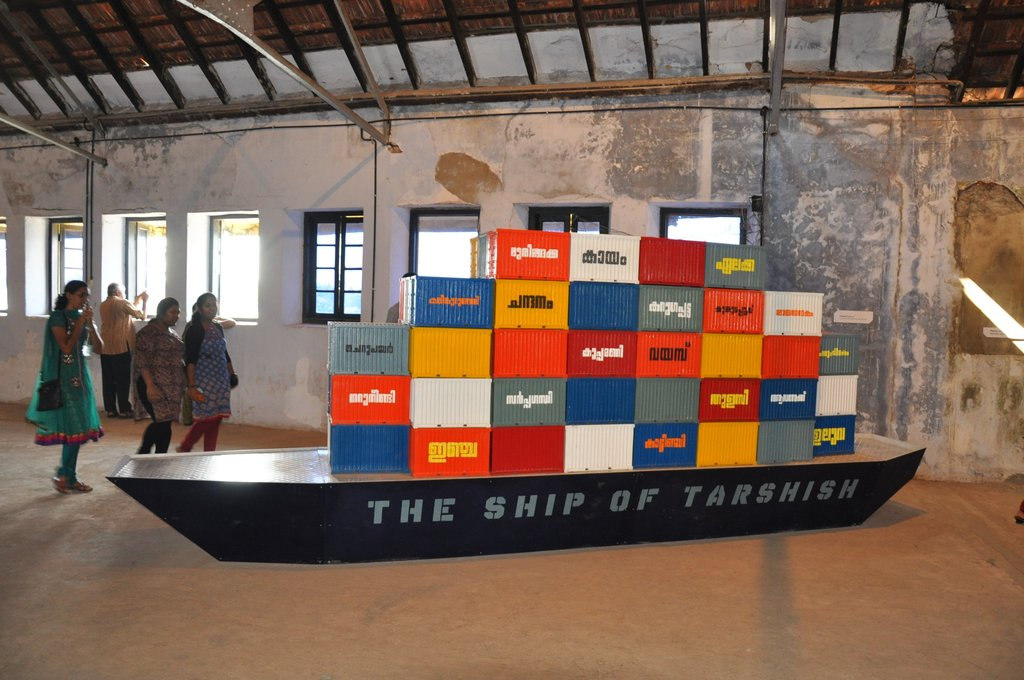
"The ship of Tarshish" by Prasad Raghavan

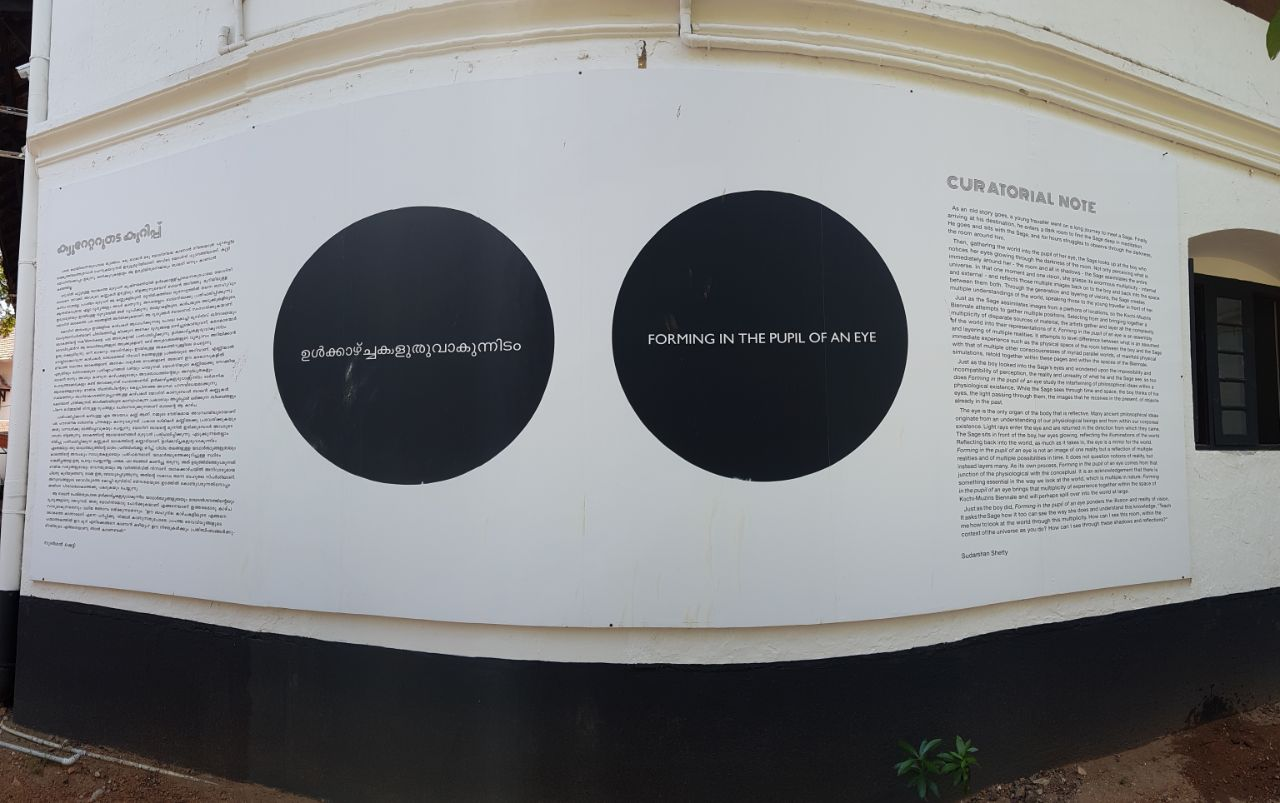
Curatorial note from Sudarshan Shetty

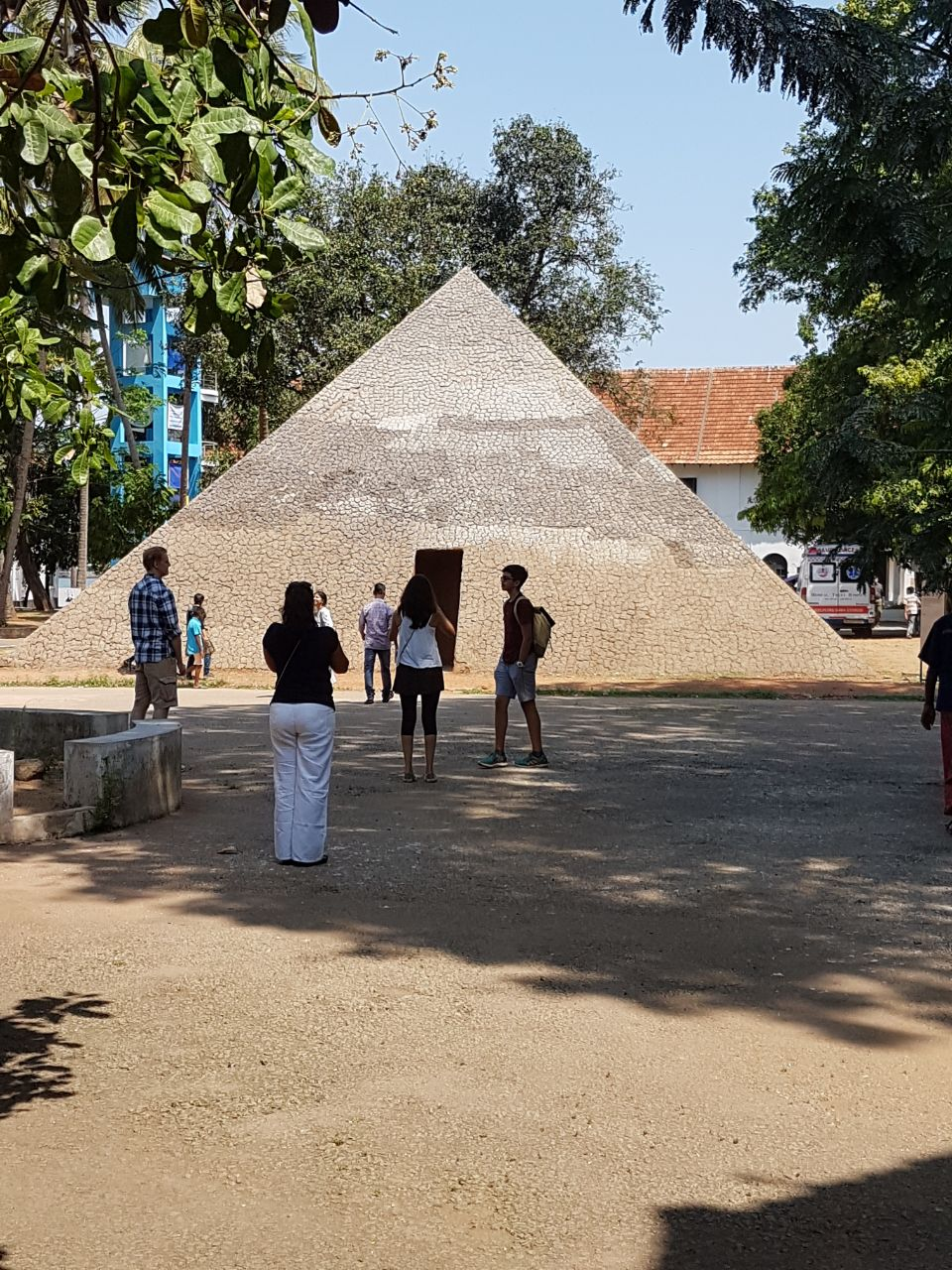
"The Pyramid of Exiled Poets" by Aleš Šteger

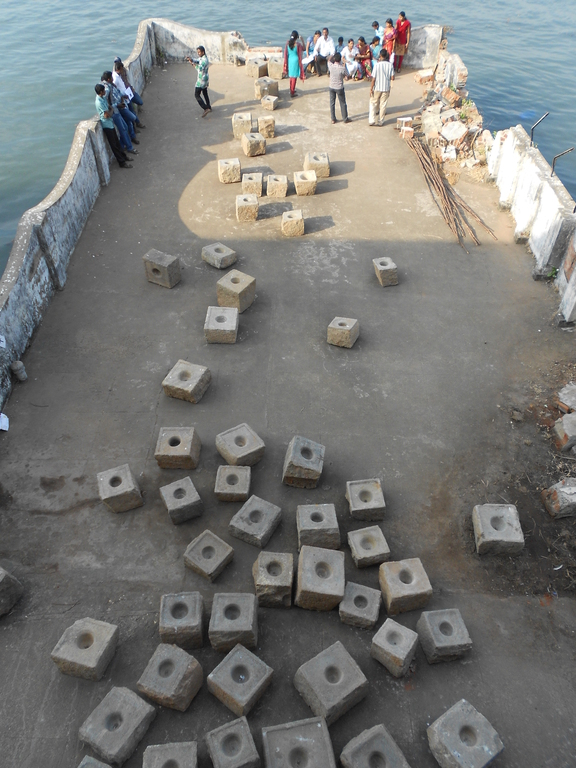
"Stop over" by Sheela Gowda

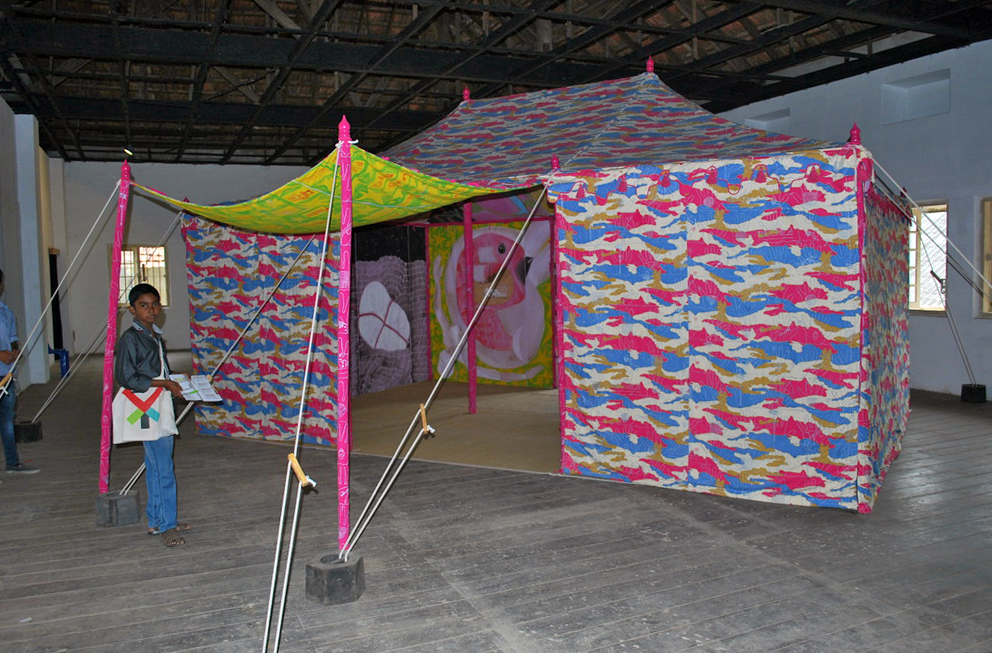
"Pepper Tent" by Francesco Clemente

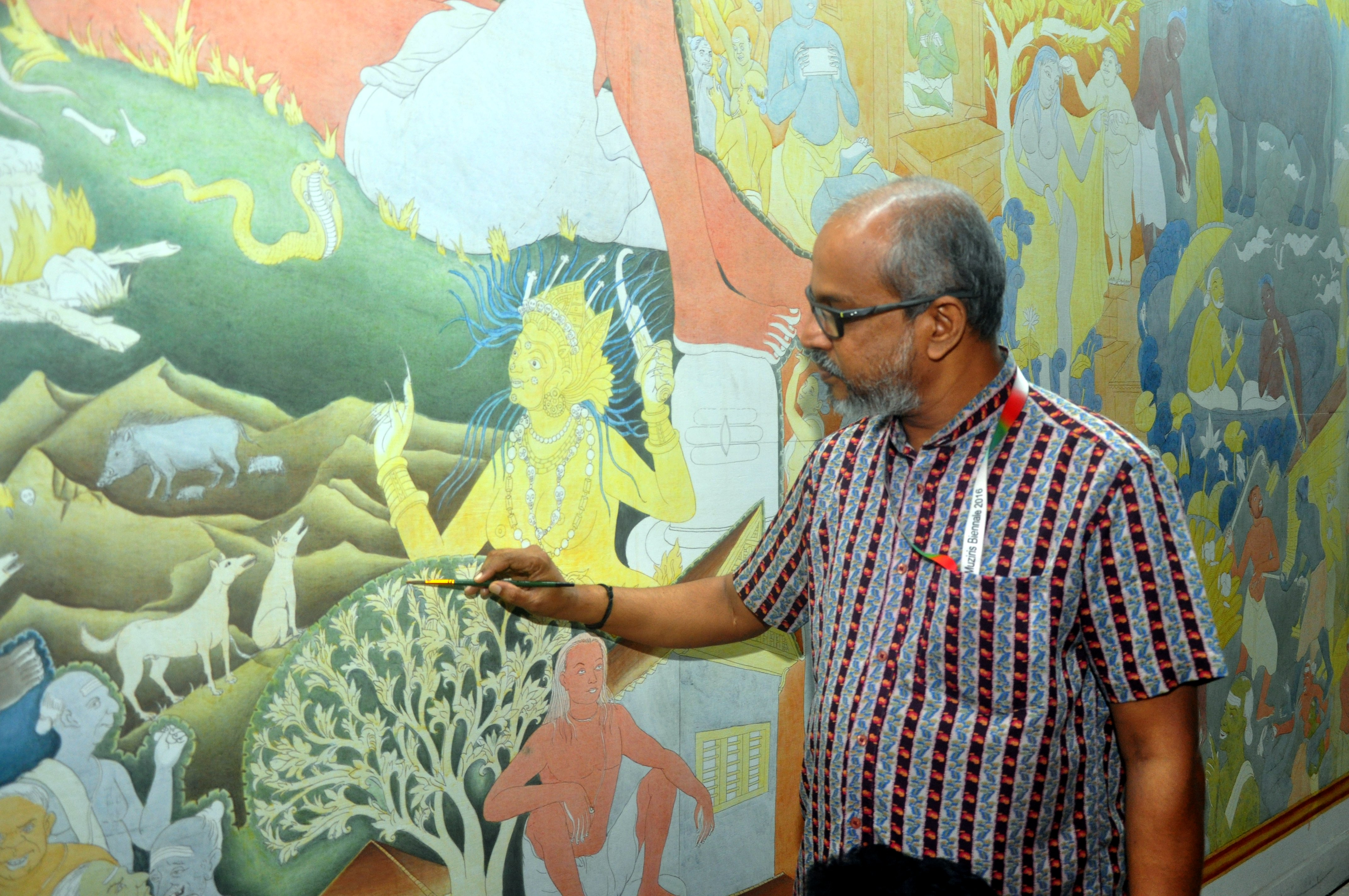
P. K. Sadanandan working on his mural

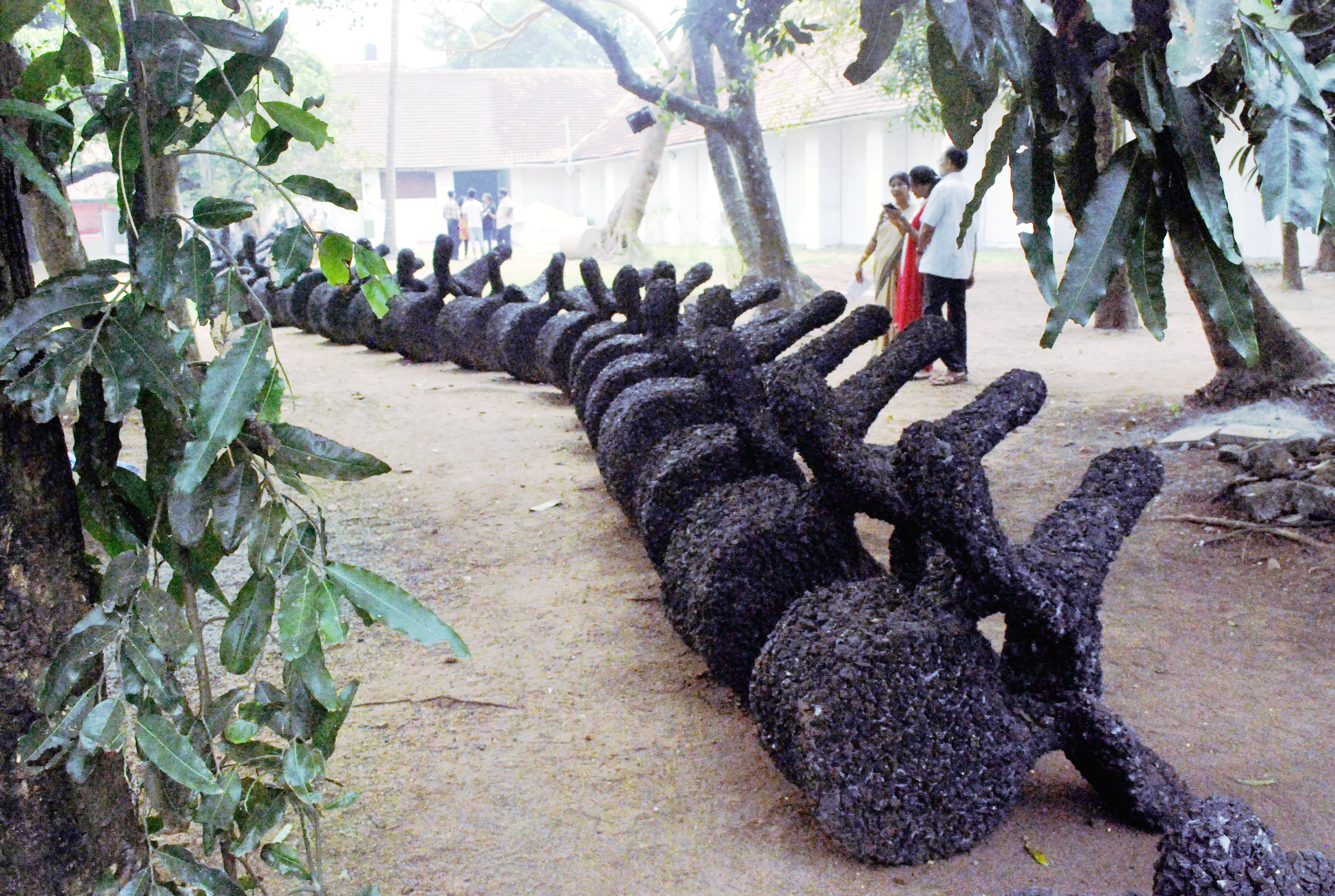
"Backbone" by Shanthamani Muddaiah

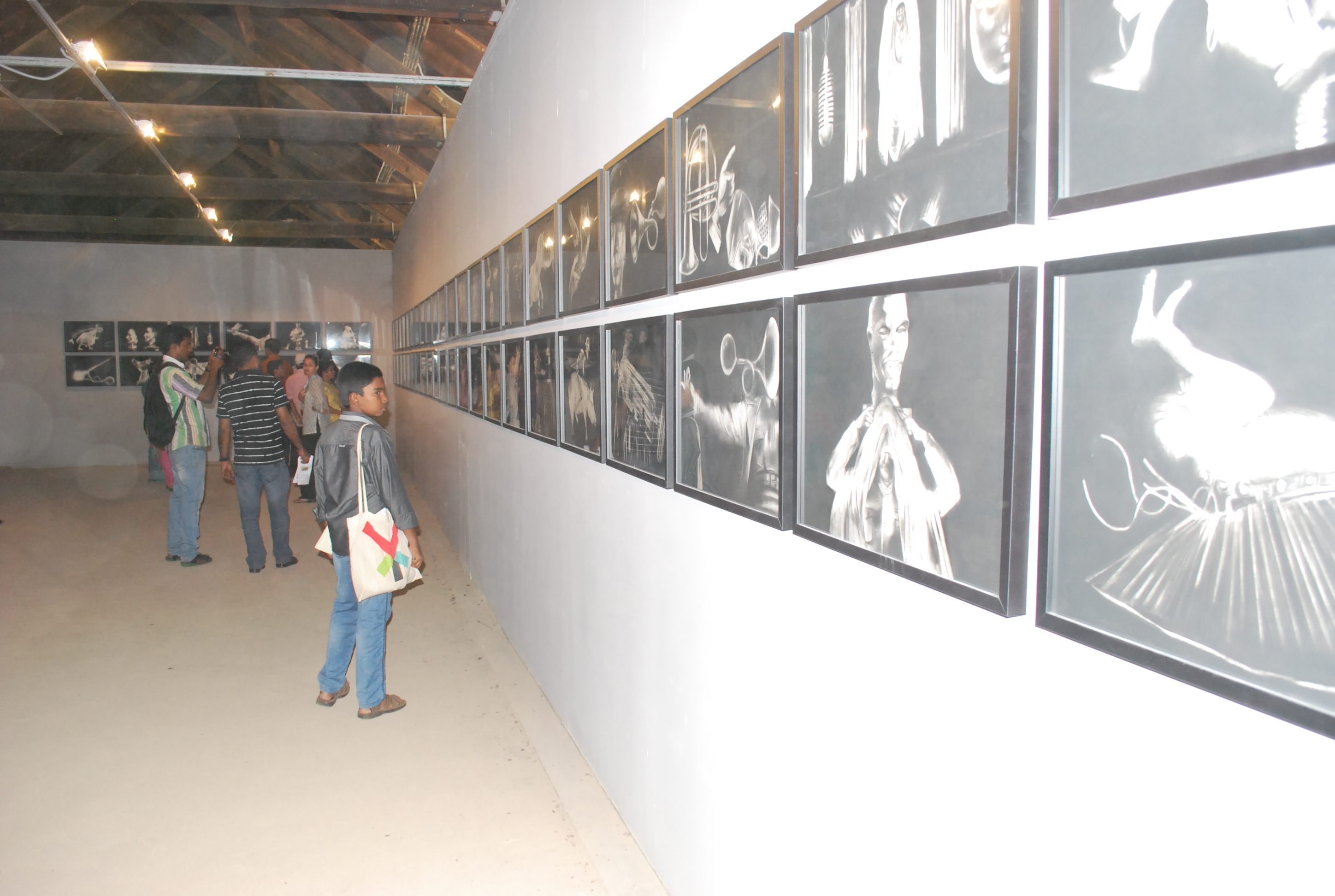
"Logics of disappearance" by K. M. Madhusudhanan

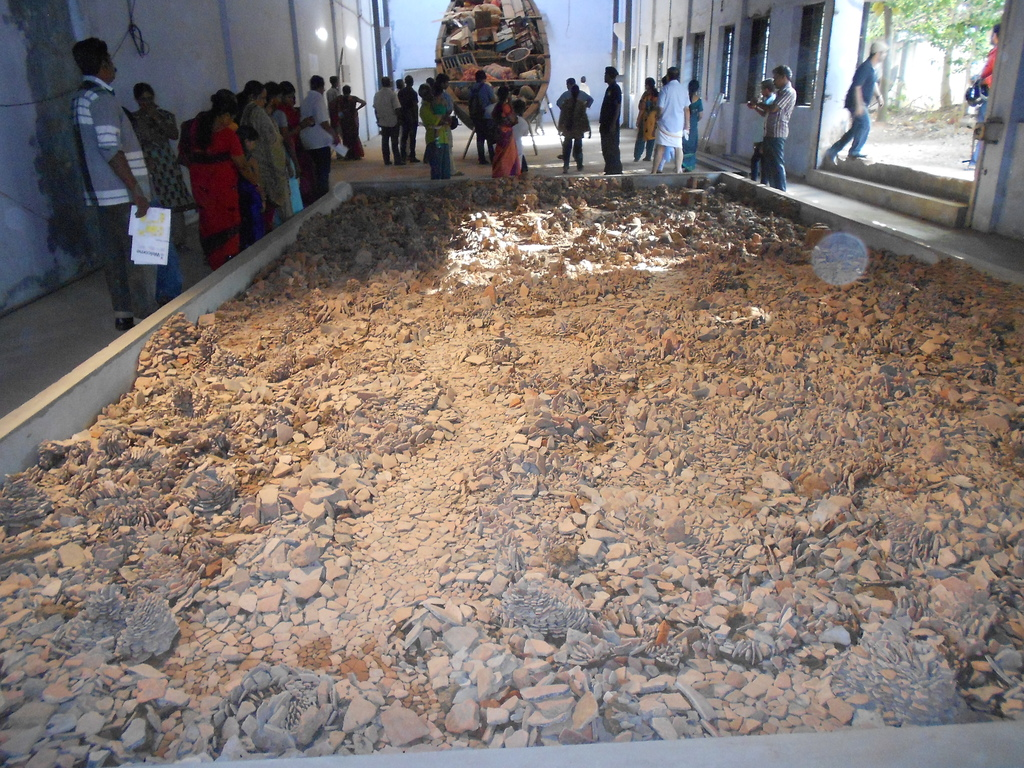
"Black gold" by Vivan Sundaram
