= K. K. Hebbar =

Indian painter and art educator (1911–1996)

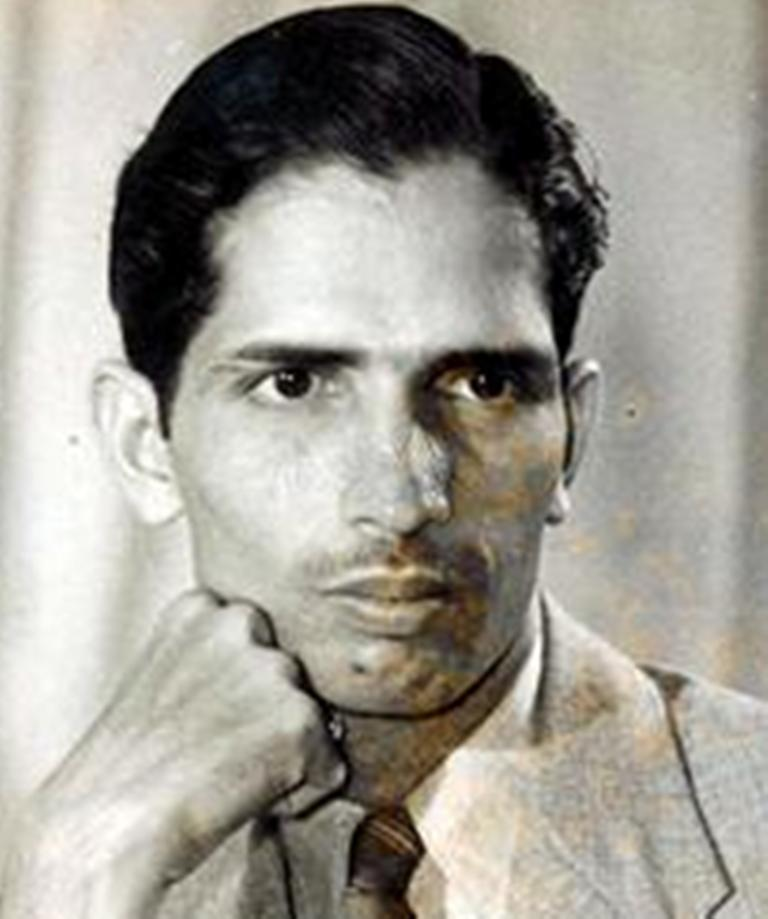
- K K Hebbar in Bombay on 11 December 1945.
- Born: Kattingeri Krishna Hebbar; 15 June 1911; Kattingeri, near Udupi, Karnataka, British Raj
- Died: 26 March 1996 (aged 84); Mumbai, Maharashtra, India
- Spouse: Shusheela Hebbar (m. 1935)
- Children: 3
- Awards: Padma Bhushan (1989); Fellowship of the Lalit Kala Akademi (1976); Padma Shri (1961)

Kattingeri Krishna Hebbar (15 June 1911 – 26 March 1996) was an Indian painter and art educator. He is well known for his paintings that captured the social life of the common people in India. Inspired by traditional Indian art, he combined the Western art techniques with his paintings to create a unique style of his own. Painting for Hebbar was about being true to the original self and this is what he tried to achieve in his works. In addition to his paintings, he is also known for his rhythmic line drawings and illustrations.

Hebbar was awarded the Padma Shri (1961) and Padma Bhushan (1989) by the Government of India for his contributions in the field of art.

== Early life and education ==
Hebbar was born on 15 June 1911 in Kattingeri near Udupi, Karnataka in a Tulu-speaking family. He was educated up to the age of five at the local mission school. His father had retired when he was eleven years old. As the family was poor, they made toys, sold them and also made a living from farming. At the age of fourteen, Hebbar got a job at the same school that he had attended. While teaching the play Shakuntala with the help of images, the officer who came to inspect the school noticed Hebbar's artistic talents and encouraged him to take up art education. The latter offered him help and said that if he did not do so, he would suspend him.

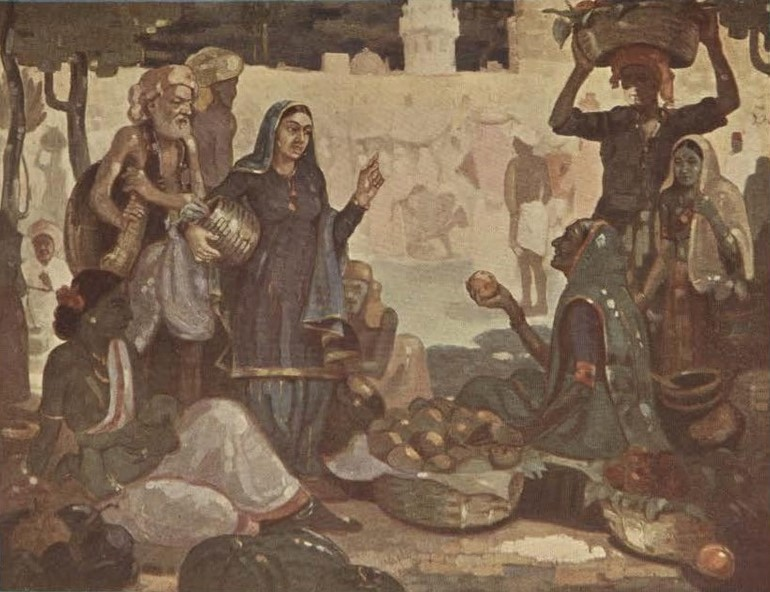
An Indian Bazaar - Painting executed by K. K. Hebbar for the Govt. Diploma examination in 1938.

After matriculation at the age of twenty one, he started his art education at Chamarajendra Technical Institute in Mysore. But after a brief period, Hebbar dropped out of school, tired of the monotonous and arid climate there, and started working for a photographer in Udupi. After seeing Hebbar's work, the photographer advised him to visit Bombay and study art.

Hebbar arrived in Mumbai in 1933 and began his studies at Nutan Kala Mandir, an art school established by G. S. Dandavatimath. He worked on retouching and enlargement work at the Koparde Studio located in front of the Chhatrapati Shivaji Terminus. Subsequently, Hebbar joined Sir J. J. School of Art and graduated in 1938 with G. D. in Art. In the year that followed, he completed a specialization in mural painting under the mentorship and encouragement of C. R. Gerrard, then director of the School of Art.

== Career ==
Hebbar worked as an art teacher at the Sir J. J. School of Art from 1940 to 1945 and continued to develop his art. Within a short span of six years, he reached the level of well known Bombay artists. Gerrard had later said,"A combination of being a good teacher as well as a good practicing artist is uncommon and Hebbar has combined these rare qualities." After that, Hebbar remained in constant touch with art institutes at different levels and emphasized on the importance of discipline in education. He also presided at several important positions which included the role of chairman at the Artists' Centre, Mumbai (1953-73) and at the Lalit Kala Akademi, Delhi (1980-84).

=== Influences ===
During the initial days of his career, Hebbar was influenced by the two-dimensional color scheme and line quality of the Indian miniature style. He drew inspiration from various sources including the writings of art historian Ananda Coomaraswamy, art of Jain manuscripts, Rajput and Mughal miniatures, and the murals at the Ajanta Caves. When he met Amrita Sher-Gil in 1939, he was fascinated to see the confluence of Western art techniques with traditional Indian art in her paintings. In 1946, he saw dark brown figures in white clothes on the green fields of Kerala during a study tour in South India. He was reminded of the paintings of Paul Gauguin during his stay in Brittany. After returning to Bombay, he painted a series based on the memories of this tour. Hebbar then traveled to Europe in 1949-50 where he got the opportunity to study Western art. He took a painting course at the Académie Julian in Paris for twenty weeks.

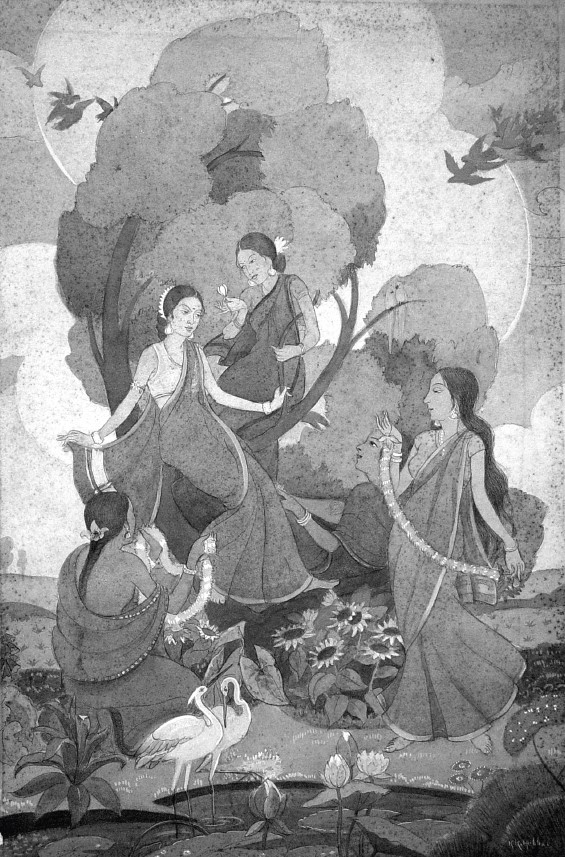
One of the early paintings (1945) by K. K. Hebbar inspired by the style of Indian miniature paintings

However, after returning from the trip abroad he said,"I was in a somewhat restless and confused state of mind. I've now decided that I'll restart painting from where I'd left off, combining the western elements as and when required." After returning to India, he stayed in Mahabaleshwar for a year due to difficult personal situation. Here he began to develop his style differently and more openly as an artist, wherein he combined different elements with his paintings.

Moreover, Hebbar was also well versed in music and dance. He himself had learned Kathak from Pandit Sunder Prasad for two years. He even performed once at the Royal Opera House in Mumbai. This knowledge about dance influenced a lot of his work, including the well known line art based drawings that he had created. In his 1961 book The Singing Line, various fluid creations of his line art can be seen.

=== Style ===
Gradually, his style of painting became free and a personality began to emerge. His paintings appeared to have evolved in stages. In the early days, his paintings were somewhat realistic. By the year 1959, Hebbar discovered a linear rhythm and he began to search for his own personality in the lives of ordinary people. Variety is found in these lines and in the pictures drawn by applying the colors directly from the tube. These lines do not give realistic details. They rearrange to express specific emotions through the natural formation of human or other shapes. Such a rhythm is seen in all his paintings. In order to achieve a certain visual effect in the pictures, he used color in a special way. In his paintings, it seems that a different expression of color is achieved by adding one layer of color over another, enhancing the imagery of his work. On the creations of Hebbar, art critic Rudolf Von Leyden had said:

Mr. Hebbar and his contemporaries in India have no easy life. Their artistic pilgrimage through arid valleys without clear vistas of their target that makes sincere efforts like those of Mr. Hebbar doubly welcome and refreshing.

The events and objects that he studied from real life were organized in unusual compositions. His approach was inclined towards a decorative depiction of the subject rather an evocative one. He focused on reducing the form and color to the simplest level possible. With a textural aspect to his colors, he combined the classical and representational forms of image making in his paintings. Overall, the fluidity, grace and rhythm of the miniature paintings was seen in his line art as well.

=== Themes ===
Hebber was brought up in a village where people celebrated traditional festivals and performed rich folk dances. Thereby, his early paintings depicted the association with rural life and the environment in South Kanara. People toiling in the farms, rural men and women engaged in dancing, villagers performing prayers on the occasion of the festival - such subjects were a common feature in his artworks. His early artworks were called his Kerala phase because of his depiction of the landscapes of the regions of Malabar and Tulu Nadu.

"Art can be addressed to the artistic sensibility of the viewer. An artist, being a part of human society, wants his works to be communicative, though not in a sense of telling a story, teaching a moral or describing nature's grandeur. If a work of art displays technical perfection and also expresses a certain mood, thought or idea, communication becomes more meaningful."

— K. K. Hebbar, India Modern: Narratives From 20th Century Indian Art

Later, he started experimenting with other themes. His paintings from the post-1970 period seem to reveal the reality of life. He was constantly aware of what was happening in the world around him, and his reaction is reflected in his pictures. He was more interested in man and his society as well as nature. As a result, his pictures emerged from various events in daily life. The horrors of the floods in Bangladesh, accidents, the horrors of the Gulf Wars etc. were some of the burning issues that he painted with uneasiness. He was also intrigued by the ever-expanding scientific discoveries that led to the creation of paintings such as Rocket and Birth of a Moon. During the last years, he painted on the subject of energy, where he tried to portray the five classical elements that influenced the formation of the Earth.

== Work ==
Some of the notable paintings of Hebbar are Hill station (1931), Karla Caves, Maidenhood, Beggars (1955), Cock Fight, Hungry Soul (1952), Folk Rhythm (1962), Storm (1969), Homage to Indian Music (1971), Full Moon (1972) among many others.

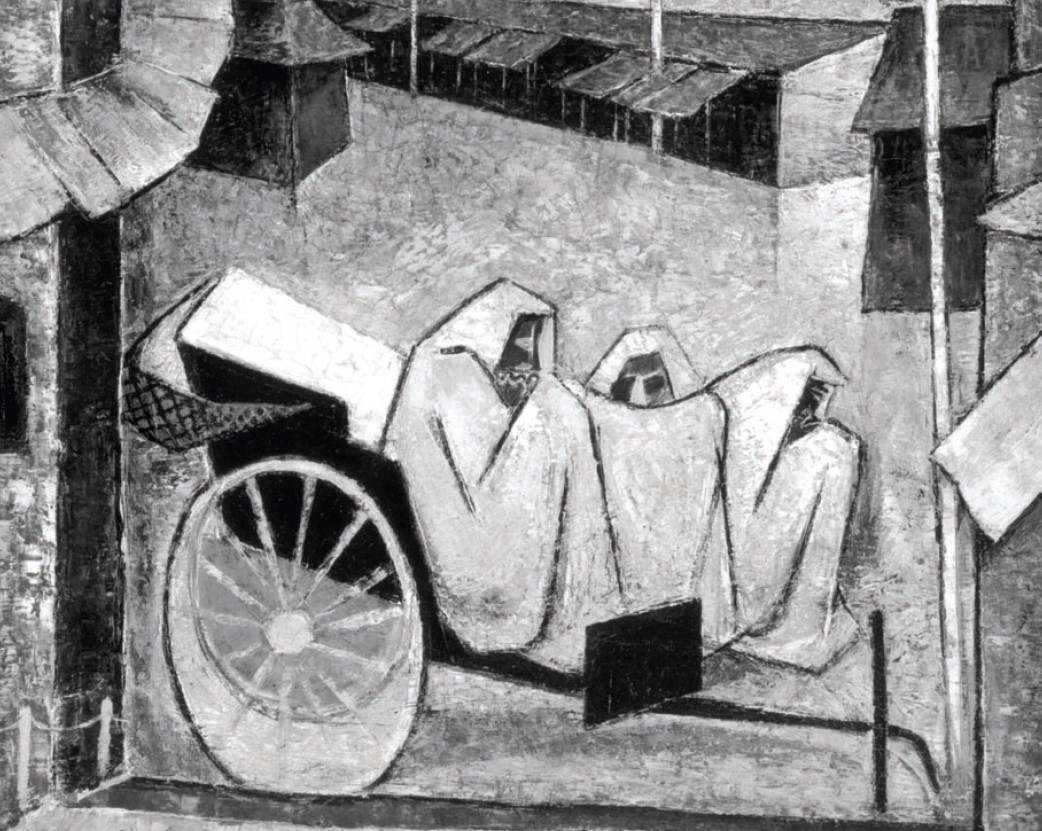
Hill station (1931) by K. K. Hebbar

Hebbar was commissioned by the Government of India to create paintings based on the achievements of Indian Army during the Italian campaign. His portraits of John F. Kennedy and Jawaharlal Nehru as well as fifty one line drawings on Cilappatikaram were published in The Illustrated Weekly of India. His artworks are in the short film Tulsidas produced by the Films Division of India where he has unfolded the entire biography of Tulsidas effectively, mainly through drawings.

=== Major exhibitions ===
Hebbar's paintings were exhibited in several exhibitions at home and abroad. His painting Women Bathing was showcased at the international exhibition organized by UNESCO at the Musée d'Art Moderne de Paris in 1946. After the Bombay Progressive Artists' Group, the Bombay Group followed which included artists like Hebbar, Laxman Pai, D. G. Kulkarni, Mohan Samant, Baburao Sadwelkar and Shiavax Chavda to name a few. This group organized six major exhibitions from 1957 to 1962 which was well received by the art community. Hebbar gained international recognition at the Art Now in India exhibitions in 1965 which were held in London and Brussels. He also participated in various international art exhibitions like the Salon de Mai (1951), Venice Biennale (1955), São Paulo Art Biennial (1959) and Tokyo Biennale (1970). A retrospective of his works was held in 1971 at the Rabindra Bhavan in Delhi.

=== Public collections ===
Hebber's portrait of Abul Kalam Azad is housed in the Parliament House, New Delhi. Other public collections in India include the National Gallery of Modern Art, Government Museum and Art Gallery, Chandigarh, Venkatappa Art Gallery, Bangalore, Government Museum, Bangalore, Academy of Fine Arts, Kolkata, Tata Institute of Fundamental Research, Mumbai, Birla Academy of Fine Arts, and Delhi Art Gallery to name a few. Overseas, Hebbar's paintings are present in museums of Russia, Poland, Czechoslovakia, Commonwealth Collection in Australia and the Staten Island Museum in the United States.

=== Awards and recognition ===
Hebbar won many awards throughout his lifetime including India's fourth and third highest civilian awards, the Padma Shri (1961) and the Padma Bhushan (1989) respectively. His other awards include Gold Medal of the Academy of Fine Arts, Kolkata (1941), Gold Medal of the Bombay Art Society (1947), the Bombay State Art Exhibition Award (1956), the Lalit Kala Akademi Award (thrice, from 1956-58), an honorary D. Litt from University of Mysore (1976), Fellowship of Lalit Kala Akademi (1976), Soviet Land Nehru Award (1983), Maharashtra Shasan Gaurav Puraskar (1990) and Varnashilpi Venkatappa Award by Government of Karnataka (1994).

== Personal life ==
Hebbar married Shusheela in 1935 and had one son, Ranna and two daughters, Rekha and Rajani. Rekha Rao is a contemporary painter whereas Rajani Prasanna is an art historian.

== Death and legacy ==
Hebbar died on 26 March 1996 in Mumbai after a two-year prolonged illness. The K. K. Hebbar Foundation has been established in his name which provides scholarships to six students each year, honors veteran painters, and organizes art workshops. Three-day birth centenary celebrations of Hebbar were held at his birthplace Kattingeri in September 2011. A retrospective of his works was exhibited at the National Gallery of Modern Art, New Delhi in the end of 2011. The show was curated by his daughters Rekha & Rajani which also included documentary screenings.

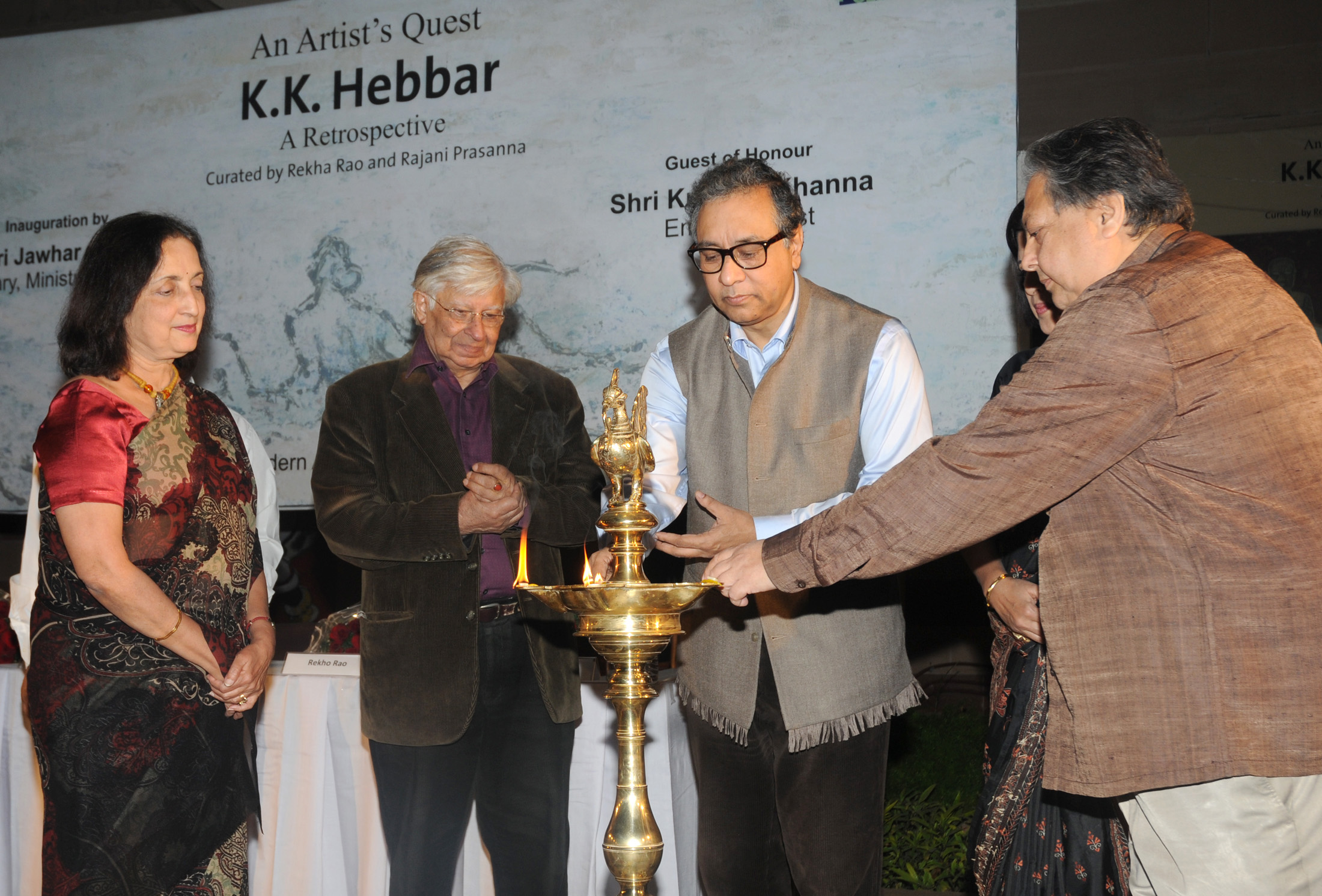
Inauguration of K. K. Hebbar's retrospective at NGMA, New Delhi in 2011 with (left to right) Rekha Rao, Krishen Khanna and Jawhar Sircar, then Secretary of Ministry of Culture.

A three-day festival as a tribute to Hebbar was organized in 2012, with talks and documentary screenings. The Hebbar Gallery and Art Centre (HGAC) was established in 2016 to promote the teaching pedagogy of Hebbar and enable cross-disciplinary engagement with artists and other cultural practitioners in and around the region of South Canara. Celebration of his 110th birth anniversary took place in 2021 with programmes on his life and works.
