= Baburao Sadwelkar =

Indian painter and art writer (1928–2000)

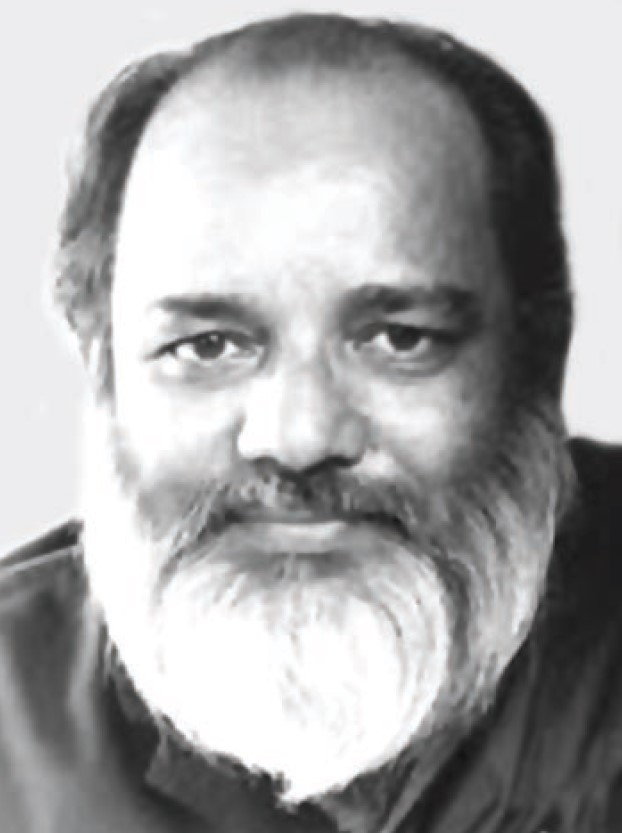
- Born: 28 June 1928; Sawantwadi, Bombay Presidency
- Died: 23 November 2000 (aged 72); Mumbai, Maharashtra, India
- Education: Sir J. J. School of Art, Mumbai
- Known for: Painting

Baburao Sadwelkar (28 June 1928 – 23 November 2000) was an Indian painter, art writer, educator and administrator. He is known for his portraits, landscape and abstract paintings in the impressionist style. As an art educator, he brought a modern outlook to art education at the Sir J. J. School of Art after learning about the American art education model under a Fulbright Scholarship in 1962–63. Sadwelkar was also passionate about the art tradition of Maharashtra and the art history of the Sir J. J. School of Art. From 1975 to 1986, he served as the Director of Art for Maharashtra State where the preservation and propagation of this artistic tradition prospered under his guidance. He wrote extensively about the art and artists from the state and which are considered as important art publications.

Sadwelkar's paintings receive less attention in today's art world. After being appointed as the state's art director, he spent a lot of time in administrative work which affected his artistic output. However, his paintings showcase mastery of drawing, great knowledge of colour and a modern approach towards the subject.

== Early life and education ==
Sadwelkar was born on 28 June 1928 in Sawantwadi, Bombay Presidency (now in Maharashtra). He was the eldest child among seven daughters and three sons of his parents, Narayan and Saraswati. His schooling till 1942 was completed at New High School in Kolhapur. After that, he passed his matriculation examination from Rajaram High School, Kolhapur in 1947. Growing up in the artistic atmosphere of Kolhapur increased his fascination with painting. However, his family forced him to pursue science after schooling. Due to his interest in painting, he became restless thereafter. In 1948, he got an opportunity to see a demonstration by renowned Bombay artist S. L. Haldankar at the Rajaram Art Society in Kolhapur. This was when Sadwelkar decided to study painting. His father was against it but his mother mortgaged her jewellery and sent him to Mumbai for art education.

== Career ==
=== Painting ===
The influence of Kolhapur's art tradition on Sadwelkar began to wane shortly after his arrival in Mumbai. Initially he studied at the Haldankar's Fine Art Institute and appeared for the exams of the Sir J. J. School of Art. Working hard to earn a living on the side, he got admitted to the fourth year of the school in 1950 and gained reputation as a smart student in a short time. When he was a student at the School of Art, the teachers who taught there were accomplished in academic realism, Indian revivalism and modern art streams. At this time, the Bombay Progressive Artists' Group was also formed which gained recognition for their experimental and rebellious art. Gradually, Sadwelkar's inclination towards modern art informed his landscapes, portraits and compositions. In 1952, he graduated from the School of Art with a G. D. in Art.

Sadwelkar received a fellowship from the School of Art in 1952–53. During this time, he was influenced by the painter Paul Klee and the philosopher J. Krishnamurti. He became interested in understanding the various art forms and art movements of the western world and tried to paint in that style. At the end of the fellowship, Sadwelkar and his contemporary painters like V. S. Gaitonde, Mohan Samant, Ambadas Khobragade, Tyeb Mehta and many other young painters were struggling artists. Everyone gathered at the Artists’ Center in Mumbai and discussed about their work. In 1956, he formed the Bombay Group along with K. H. Ara, K. K. Hebbar, Shiavax Chavda, Laxman Pai, D. G. Kulkarni, Mohan Samant and Harkishan Lall. He organized several group exhibitions on behalf of the group until it was dissolved 1962.

=== Art educator ===
Kala Ghoda, Mumbai (1954) a painting by Baburao Sadwelkar

At the end of 1953, Sadwelkar was appointed as a teacher at the Sir J. J. School of Art. Along with the modern thinker and educator Shankar Palsikar, he started changing the style of art education in the school. Sadwelkar taught the mural decoration class which included a systematic study of fresco, tempera, mosaic and terracotta medium. While teaching at the School of Art, he was awarded the Fulbright Scholarship in 1962–63, under which he studied the nuances of American art education at the Rhode Island School of Design in the United States.

After returning from the US, he began to apply the new teaching methods he had learned there. But in the atmosphere of Sir J. J. School of Art, it did not become very popular. He insisted that the artist should pursue other arts as well. He insisted on trying hard to put one's opinions & thoughts into practice and expressed contempt for those who did not. This led to differences with his contemporaries and many teachers of that time. Subsequently, he resigned as professor in 1971. From 1971 to 1974, he was a visiting faculty at the IDC School of Design and continued his life as a professional painter after that.

=== Administration ===
Sadwelkar was appointed as the Director of Arts for Maharashtra State in 1975. His plans and efforts were directed towards preserving the art tradition of Maharashtra and making progress in the field of art education. However, in some cases, these plans did not work out. The apathy of the society and the government in this regard bothered him. Considering this fact, he was determined to create awareness about the painting-sculptural vision, traditional and folk arts in Maharashtra. He introduced ingenious and important schemes which provided impetus to the work of preservation and promotion of the state's art tradition.

The preservation, conservation and exhibition of artworks created by the students and archived in the collections of the School of Art from 1885 to 1975, started under Sadwelkar's guidance. He started the practice of displaying paintings of notable artists from the past in State Art Exhibitions organized by the Directorate of Art so as to pay homage to them. The exhibition Art and Traditions of Maharashtra was held in Delhi on the occasion of Maharashtra Day in 1981, which was a resounding success. Further, he also urged the Government of Maharashtra to release calendars based on murals at Wai, Pinguli's pictorial tradition as well as painters and sculptors from Maharashtra. As a part of this initiative, the government calendars featured research essays and editorials that uplifted its status. His work was recognized nationally and internationally. Among them, the 1977 calendar Art of Painting in Maharashtra received the National Award for Best Concept and Design.

Due to the acceptance of the post of Director of Arts, Sadwelkar's painting routine gradually came to a standstill. It took him a long time to cope with the administrative work and the fierce opposition from some colleagues. But his work on preservation, study, promotion and writing about visual arts never stopped. This also inspired some of the next generation of artists to do this kind of work. He retired from the post of art director in 1986. Later, he was selected to the Board of Trustees, Prince of Wales Museum, Bombay in 1990–91 and was also the member of the general council at the Lalit Kala Akademi, New Delhi.

=== Art writing ===
From the year 1955, Sadwelkar wrote extensively about art in Marathi and English. The concept of the Sir J. J. School of Art's annual magazine Roopbheda was conceived by him and he edited the first edition published in 1956, followed by 1959, 1960 and 1968. His writings on art, artists and art criticism were published in magazines like Mauj, Satyakatha, Abhiruchi, Navbharat, Marg and also in dailies like Maharashtra Times, Loksatta and Navshakti. He wrote a number of entries for the Marathi Vishwakosh and worked as its consultant editor from 1977. He also gave lectures on All India Radio and participated in discussions on Doordarshan. In the year 1988, the Bombay Art Society completed its 100 years of existence. Sadwelkar organized a centennial exhibition in 1989 that showcased the transformation that took place in the field of visual arts during this time period. The Story of Hundred Years is an important book published on this occasion.

Sadwelkar's closeness with the Bombay School of artists continued to be feature in his writings. Publisher H. V. Mote planned to bring out Vishrabdha Sharda – Khand Teen (Part 3), a book on correspondence letters of Indian artists. Dinkar Kowshik wrote a preface for this book. Although, after realizing that the preamble was somewhat tilting towards the Bengal school, Mote decided to add some new parts and handed over the responsibility Sadwelkar. The latter corresponded with Kowshik without hesitation and wrote a chapter titled Kalapravah in Maharashtra – Bombay School along with an introduction to the artists. The additional content provided by him increased the usefulness of this book. When Sadwelkar was a trustee of Jehangir Art Gallery, he published a book Contemporary Indian Painters 1996, Associated with Jehangir Art Gallery, in 1996, as a fundraiser. In the same year, his book Vartaman Chitrasutra (Contemporary Principles of Art) was published. However, his dream of exhibiting the works of the Bombay School together remained unfulfilled. From time to time he wrote articles expressing his grief and sorrow in this regard.

== Work ==
=== Style ===
Sadwelkar painted a variety of subjects in different styles. He was most inspired by the Impressionist painters. Bright colours, vigorous handling, freedom of invention and experimental use of distortion were the features of his artworks. He painted many artistic and quality portraits by placing models in front of him. In these portraits, along with the personality of the sitter, he experimented with composition and colour. His portraits were praised by Rudolf von Leyden, Walter Langhammer and Emmanuel Schlesinger, the trio of influential artists and art critics of the contemporary art world at that time. In his depictions of nature, he found a unique blend of Mumbai's environment, namely buildings, squares, trees, trams, buses and crowds. Thereby, he exhibited a series of paintings on Images of the City. The strong use of white color along with water colours is a feature of his landscapes. He was influenced by the early landscapes of S. H. Raza and A. A. Almelkar. In the later phase, he mostly painted modernist paintings that showcased various subjects and themes.

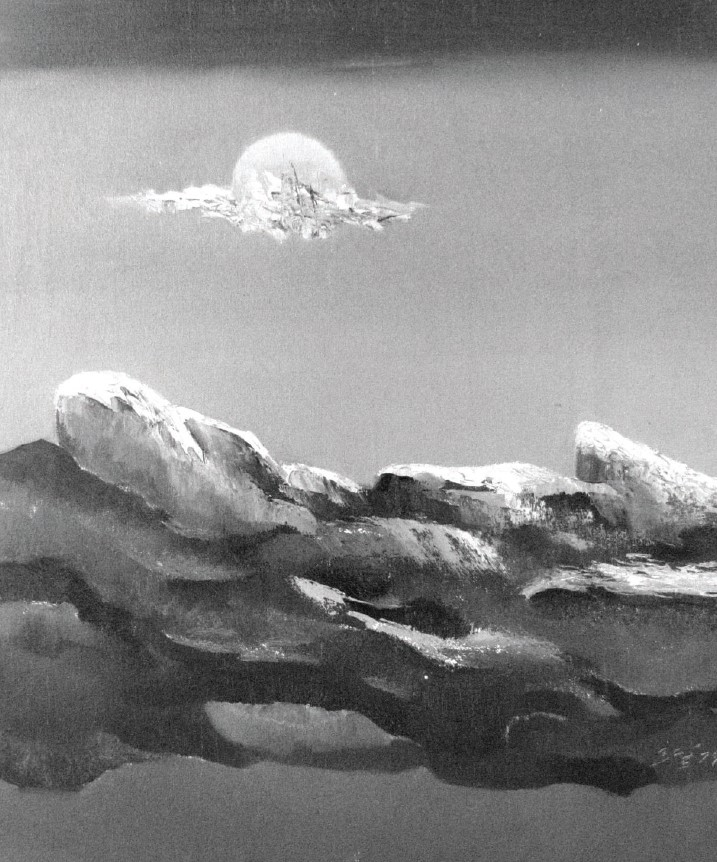
Moonscape (1980), oil on canvas by Baburao Sadwelkar

In his paintings, Sadwelkar experimented with a range of illustrations and distortions, from poetic images to abstract paintings. Some of his notable abstract paintings include One World (1957), Lunatic (1959), The Earth – I (1962), Image of the City (1963), The Cosmic City II (1974), Flight of the Lunar Rock (1974) and Floating Cities (1981), to name a few. After this he became interested in the scientific discoveries of the time and he painted pictures on these subjects. For example, the effect of space missions in various countries of the world can be seen in Sadwelkar's series titled Space Exploration. He also painted the series Mountains in 1986. Apart from this, Sadwelkar also created commercial murals for National Defence Academy, Pune; Bal Bhavan, Mumbai; Asia '72 Industries Fair, New Delhi; and Hurst-Euless-Bedford School in Texas, USA.

=== Exhibitions ===
In addition to exhibitions with the Bombay Group, Sadwelkar held seven one-man shows of his artworks between 1955 and 1974. His international exhibition participation include the 27th Venice Biennale in 1954; Asian Artist Exhibition, Tokyo in 1958; the Second Biennale de Paris in 1961; and the São Paulo Art Biennial in 1965 & 1971. The works of Sadwelkar are housed in the collections of Dr. Bhau Daji Lad Museum, Mumbai; National Gallery of Modern Art, New Delhi; Tata Institute of Fundamental Research, Mumbai; and Government Museum and Art Gallery, Chandigarh among many others.

=== Awards and recognition ===
Sadwelkar won numerous awards for his paintings. At the first State Art Exhibition in 1956, he received 2nd prize for his portrait Bobby. At the Bombay Art Society exhibitions, his portraits Tara and Devi won awards in 1954 and 1955, respectively. This was followed by a silver medal in 1956 for his painting Escape 2001 A.D., Gold Medal in 1958 for a portrait titled Dadaji and another gold medal for the painting Cosmic Station in 1959. After his paintings won first prize at the 1961 State Art Exhibition, he decided to retire from competitive exhibitions.

== Personal life ==
In 1956, Sadwelkar married Vijoo Bhise, a mural student that he taught at the Sir J. J. School of Art. The couple had two sons, Neil and Sheil, and one daughter, Neeta. Sheil Sadwelkar was an artist and designer, known for his artworks made with black ballpoint pen. Neil Sadwelkar is a film editor and technology consultant to film-makers.

After the death of his wife in 1990, Sadwelkar became somewhat lonely. In 1999, he initiated the Vijoo Sadwelkar Award in memory of his wife, an accomplished artist herself. Sadwelkar gave out this award to women artists at the grass-roots level who deserved recognition as well as required support to propel their art career further.

Ravindra Mestry, son of Baburao Painter, was Sadwelkar's classmate in Kolhapur and their friendship lasted for the rest of their lives.

== Death and legacy ==
One of the editions of Viju Sadwelkar Award ceremony was scheduled on 24 November 2000. However, he died on 23 November 2000. The book Maharashtratil Kalavanta – Adarniya ani Smaraniya (Maharashtra Artists – Respected and Memorable), which he had compiled before his death, was published in 2007.
