= Shiavax Chavda =

Indian artist (1914–1990)

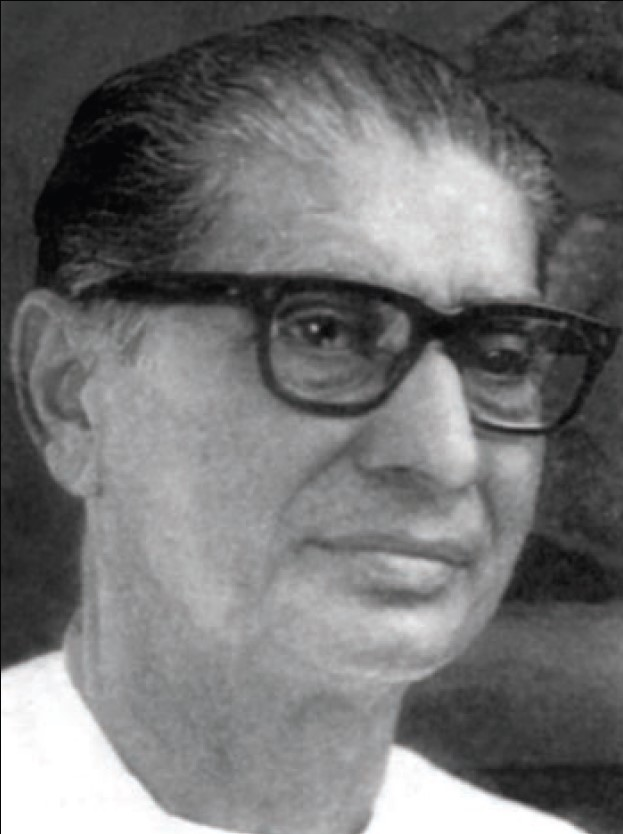
- Born: 11 December 1914; Navsari, Gujarat
- Died: 18 August 1990 (aged 75); Mumbai, Maharashtra
- Education: Sir J. J. School of Art (1930-35); Slade School of Fine Art (1936-38)
- Known for: Painting; illustration; mural
- Spouse: Khurshid Vajifdar
- Children: 2
- Awards: Fellow of Lalit Kala Akademi (1986)
- Website: www.shiavaxchavda.com

Shiavax Dhanjibhoy Chavda (18 June 1914 – 18 August 1990) was an Indian painter, illustrator and muralist. Known for his dynamic line drawings and paintings, Chavda's work mainly showcased the dancers and musicians from India and Southeast Asia.

== Early life and education ==
Chavda was born in a middle class Parsi family on 18 June 1914 in Navsari, Gujarat. His father Dhanjibhoy was a trader and his mother's name was Hillamai. He completed his school education in Navsari and joined the Sir J. J. School of Art in Mumbai.

After passing the art diploma examination in 1935, he was awarded the Sir Ratan Tata Scholarship in 1936 for further studies and secured admission in Slade School of Fine Art in London. Under the guidance of eminent teachers such as Randolph Schwabe combined with self-study, he completed the three-year course in two years itself, graduating with a fine arts diploma in 1938. A few months later, he also trained at the Académie de la Grande Chaumière in Paris.

During his stay in Europe, Chavda mastered the techniques of murals, lithography, painting restoration, as well as theater stage design with the Russian artist Vladimir Polunin. After his return to India in 1939, he studied Indian classical music and took elementary lessons in Indian classical dance. He was also briefly associated with the Bombay Progressive Artists' Group and worked as an art director with a well-known film unit.

== Career ==
Initially, Chavda painted in Victorian realistic style. During his travels across India, he studied the rural and tribal life, animals, as well as the architecture of Ajanta & Ellora, Khajuraho, Sanchi etc., and drew numerous sketches and pen-ink drawings. He used to visit the zoo and sketch various animals, their movements and postures. He also made many sketches and colorful pictures of cock as a subject. Additionally, he studied the folk art, folk dance and architecture of Indonesian islands like Java, Sumatra and Bali through sketches and subsequently developed his own style.

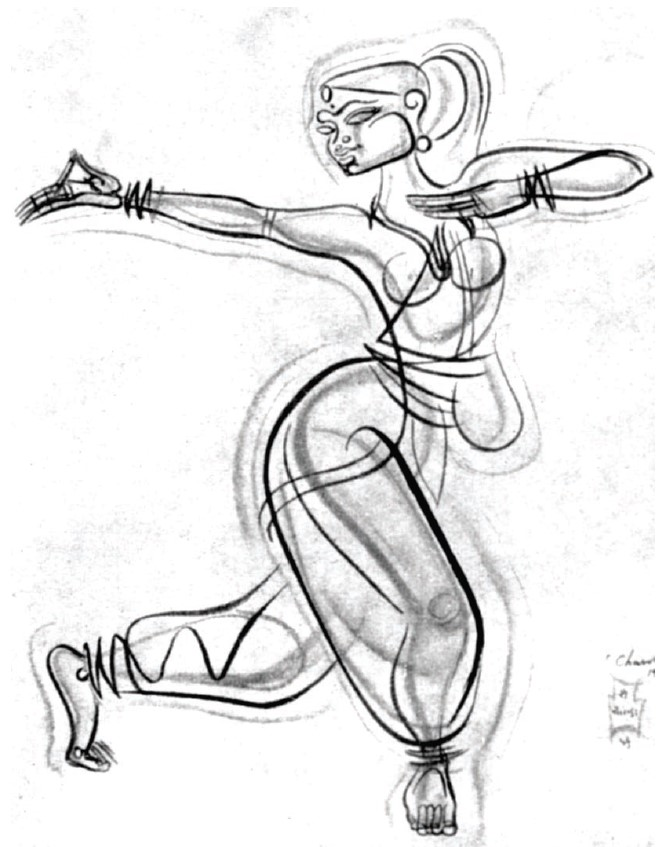
Sketch of a Bharatanatyam dancer by Shiavax Chavda

=== Style ===
Chavda was fascinated by the dynamic movements of individuals and groups of people engaged in their chores, dancers in various forms, and musicians showcasing their style and rhythm. He usually painted on canvas in impasto style, applying the paint with a painting knife. The characteristic of Chavda's artworks were the rhythmic lines, which he used to capture the motion and movements in the picture by sketching them quickly. In his paintings, he brought life to the image by using vivid colors while maintaining the predominance of sketched lines. Describing his approach to art, Chavda said:

Correctness of colour does not matter. I even distort the figures to give them character and create designs with them. I find no pleasure in actually reproducing life as I see and paint realistically; where is creative imagination otherwise?

Gradually, Chavda started to portray his subjects in an abstract style using the same colours and textures that were applied in his early artworks.

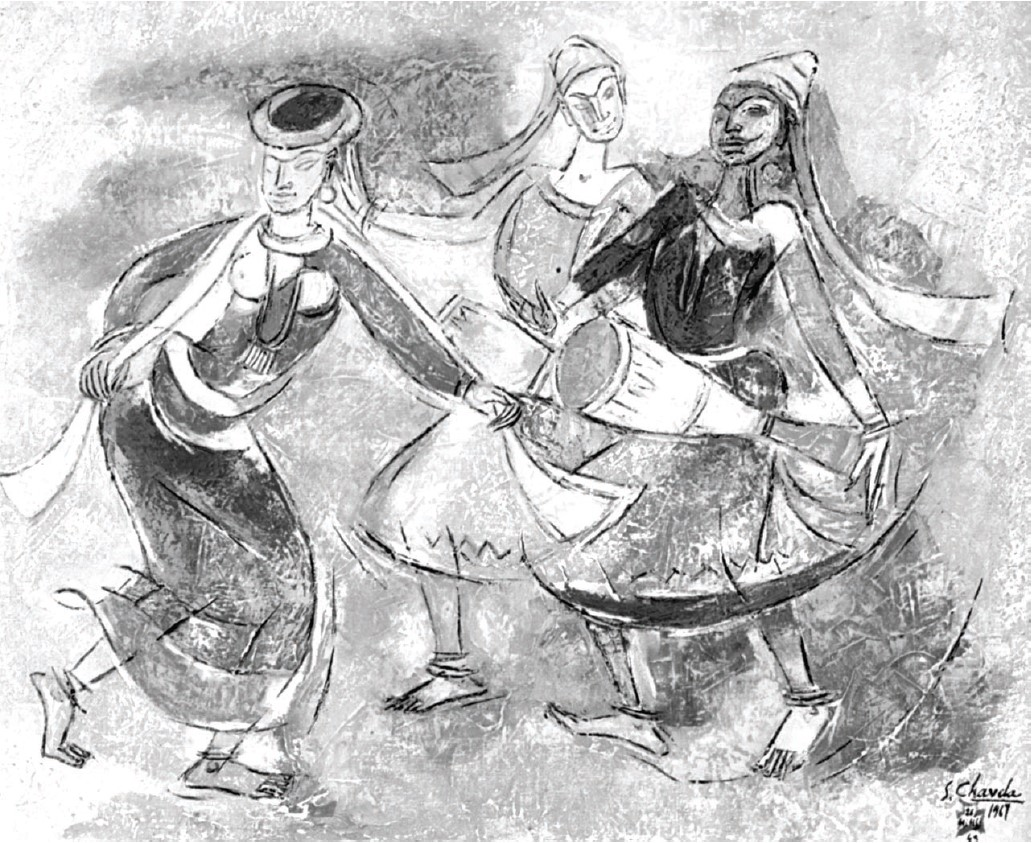
Folk dancers (1967) by Shiavax Chavda

=== Themes ===
The subject matter was expressed by Chavda by systematically laying out the basic elements of a drawing like lines, shapes, rhythm etc. He created colorful drawings and sketches based on Indian dance forms such as Bharatanatyam and Odissi as well as ballet dance forms of Europe. He also used yantra from Tantric art as images or symbols in his artworks. In 1949, Henry Heras had requested Chavda to create paintings on Christ-theme. The latter painted Biblical pictures such as Cross Maidan and Death of Pope Pius XII in Expressionist style which were exhibited in Rome during the Jubilaeum maximum.

=== Reception ===
In an article for The Modern Review, Prof. O. C. Gangoly wrote that Chavda successfully extracted the lessons from modern European art. He did not confine himself to Western modernistic techniques but also drew valuable lessons from the traditions of old Indian sculptures, which was demonstrated in his studies of the sculptures of Ambarnath. Another article for The Contemporary Review by A. S. Raman described Chavda as the master of mood and movement. Raman writes that he could capture a given moment with uncanny accuracy and spontaneity. Further, the writer mentions that the studied casualness of his line was deceptive, for there was a good deal of concentration and preparation behind it. "He painted the Indian scene with the sardonic precision and detachment of an observer, rather than with the passion and abandon of one involved in it", quotes Raman. He also suspected that Chavda secretly prayed at the shrine of Henri de Toulouse-Lautrec.

== Work ==
Notable paintings of Chavda include Calico Printers, Mother's love, Worship in Kulu, Rangoli, Toddy Sellers, Daily Work, Booking Office and In the Balcony among others. He had created murals for the Mumbai offices of Air India, Burmah Oil, Reliance Group and the buildings of People's Insurance Company, National Centre for the Performing Arts (NCPA). He also painted commissioned portraits for various government and private organizations. Chavda was invited by the Assam government to portray the diversity of tribal life in Assam. Additionally, he had provided line drawings for Balwant Gargi's book titled Folk Theater of India. Furthermore, he was associated with K. K. Hebbar for some time at the Bombay Art Society, and sought to change the old way of thinking in the society and to bring a modern approach to it.

=== Major exhibitions ===
Chavda's first solo exhibition was held in 1945 at the Princes' Room of the Taj Mahal Palace Hotel in Mumbai. This was followed by a one-man exhibition in 1946 at the Silverfish Club and another in 1947 at the Princes' Room of the Taj Hotel which was inaugurated on 15 January 1947. The latter show included a series of paintings made during his visit to Kullu Valley in 1943 and other set of artworks created during his stay in the remote villages of Gujarat in 1946. In May 1951, India had participated in Salon de Mai for the first time. Chavda was among the thirteen artists from India who had exhibited in the Indian section of this event. Chavda was also a part the Bombay Group which included artists like Hebbar, Laxman Pai, D. G. Kulkarni, Mohan Samant, and Baburao Sadwelkar to name a few. This group organized six major exhibitions from 1957 to 1962 which was well received by the art community.

=== Public collections ===
The artworks of Chavda are housed in the collections of several local and foreign collectors, museums and art galleries such as Baroda Museum & Picture Gallery, National Gallery of Modern Art, Tata Institute of Fundamental Research, Jehangir Nicholson Art Foundation, Tate and Victoria and Albert Museum to name a few.

=== Awards and nominations ===
Chavda was elected as the Fellow of Lalit Kala Akademi in 1986. He was also adjudged as the 'Artist of the Year' by the Government of Maharashtra in 1990.

== Personal life ==
In 1947, Shiavax married Khurshid Vajifdar, an expert in Indian classical dance and sister of Shirin Vajifdar. They had two children – a daughter named Jeroo who is an Odissi dancer and a son named Pervez who is an architect.

== Death and legacy ==
Chavda died on 18 August 1990 in Mumbai at the age of 75. A retrospective of his works was held at Jehangir Art Gallery in 1993 and 2017. Another retrospective was organized at the Nehru Centre Art Gallery in 2018.
