= Shiavax =

Shiavax is a given name. Notable people with the given name include:

- Shiavax Chavda (1914–1990), Indian painter
- Shiavax Jal Vazifdar (born 1956), Indian lawyer
