= K. Venkatappa =

Indian painter, sculptor and musician (1886-1965)

- K. Venkatappa
- Born: 28 June 1886; Mysore, Mysore Kingdom, British India
- Died: 1965 (aged 78–79); Bangalore, Karnataka, India
- Education: Government College of Art & Craft
- Known for: Painter, sculptor and an exponent of veena
- Memorials: Venkatappa Art Gallery

K. Venkatappa (28 June 1886 – 1965) was a pioneer painter, sculptor and an exponent of veena. He was born into a family of court painters in the princely state of Mysore, present day Karnataka. He was a pupil of Abanindranath Tagore. He was best known for his watercolors, with sensible realism. His Ootacamund watercolors reflect his independent vision.

In 1974, The Government of Karnataka established a dedicated art gallery in Bengaluru in Venkatappa's name called the Venkatappa Art Gallery also referred to as the VAG. At VAG his watercolors and plaster bas reliefs are displayed alongside other spaces meant for use by other artists as gallery spaces.

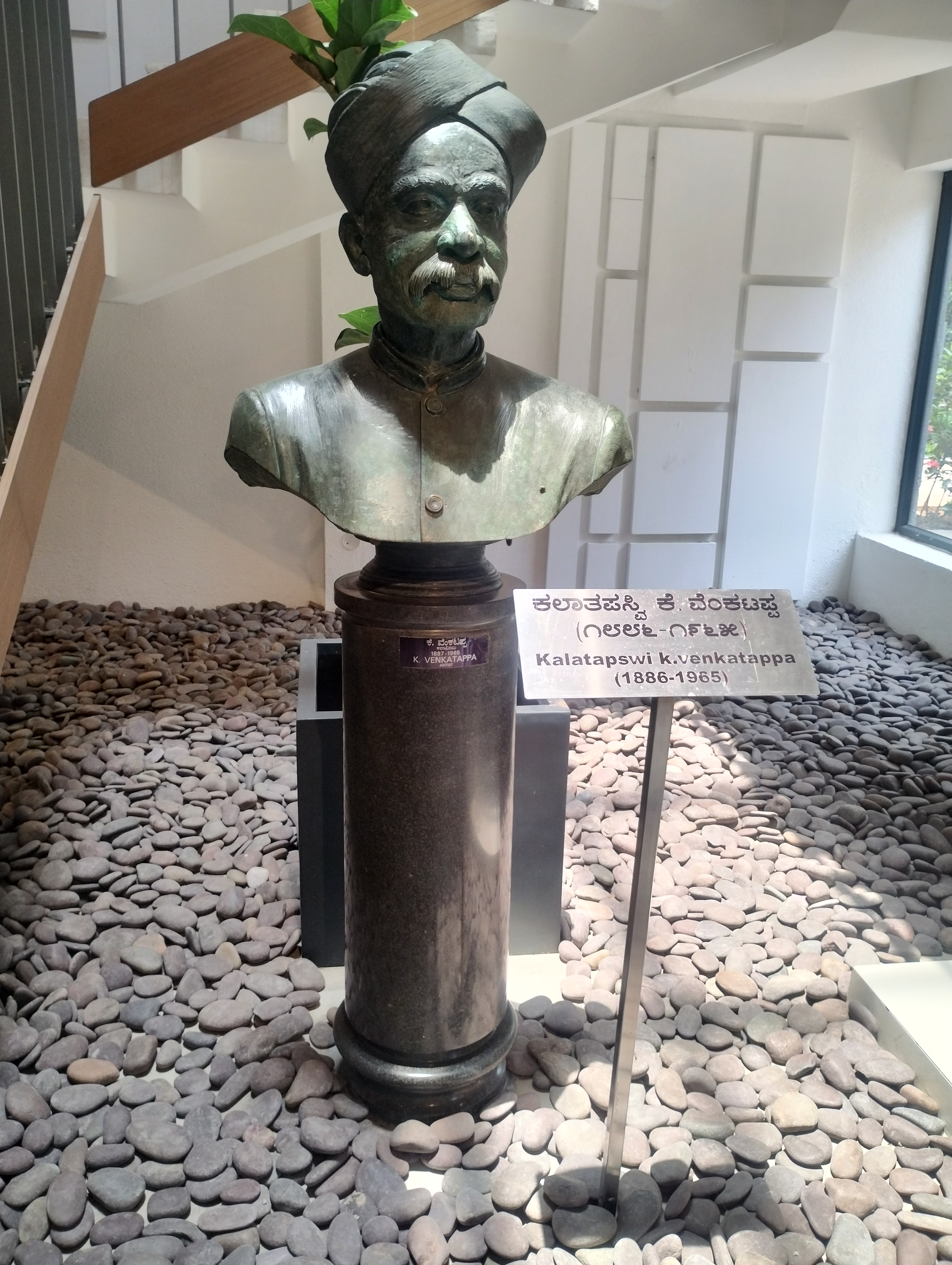
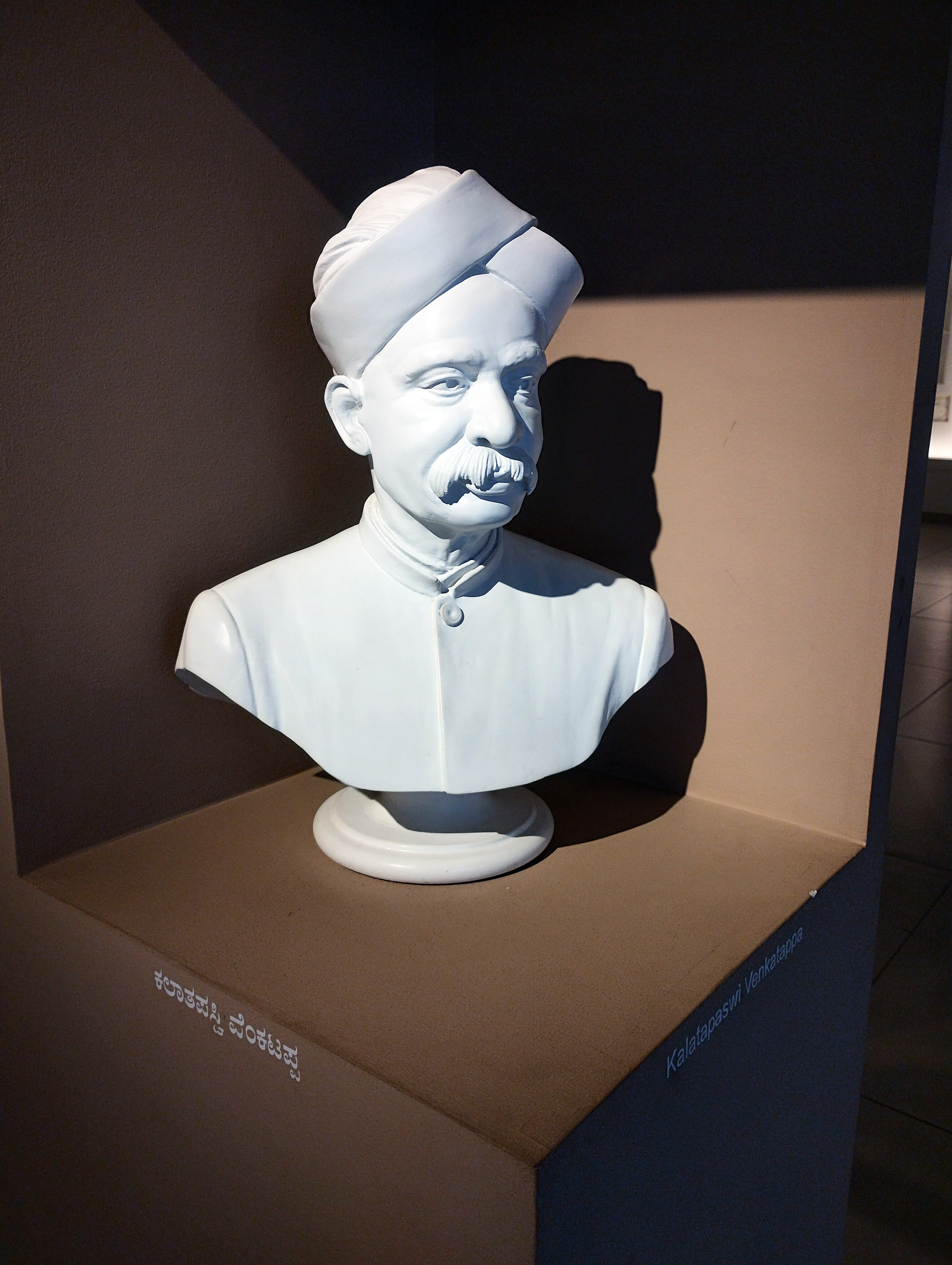
Sculptures of K. Venkatappa at Venkatappa Art Gallery, Bengaluru (2026)

== Early life ==
Venkatappa was born in a family of Chitrakara, who were the court painters of the Mysore Kingdom and artisans under the Vijayanagara kings. From an early age he was taught into the art of painting and assisted his father in the palace of Krishna Raja Wadiyar IV. The Maharaja appreciated his talents and encouraged him to study further in the Government School of Art, Calcutta, which he attended from 1909 to 1916. There, he studied under Abanindranath Tagore with students such as Nandalal Bose, and was met with appreciation.

== As an early artist ==
Venkatappa's paintings were predominantly watercolor, in contrast to a popular movement in the Mysore court to oils during his time, following Ravi Varma. Venkatappa was an eccentric, distancing himself from Tagore and his other students by retiring to the court, but also resisting his position as a simple court artisan by rejecting commissions that constrained his style and did not match his expected compensation; rejecting salaried positions tying him to the palace or other institutions and painting in a modern style. He "made a self-conscious attempt to assume the position of a distracted genius, indifferent to the mundane world of praise and profit." This, along with his study of veena – in whose pursuit he largely abandoned painting, kept him at a distance from the art world until his discovery by James Cousins and a sale of art to the Mysore Yuvaraja in 1924.

Along with Nandalal Bose and others, Venkatappa helped Lady Herringham to copy Ajanta frescoes.

== Watercolors ==
In 1926, Venkatappa began producing landscapes of Ooty, producing a second round of landscapes of Kodaikanal in 1934. His Ooty watercolors are said to be the finest examples of watercolor painting. Mahatma Gandhi visited Mysore and happen to see the paintings of Venkatappa, and was thrilled by sensitiveness captured in the paintings. He later wrote in his journal Young India:

Even a layman could not but be struck with Venkatappa's minute attention to detail, and mastery of line and colour. His pictures of dawn, morning and twilight with their wonderful cloud effects produce an atmosphere of peacefulness and repose that the artist has assimilated by his long and intensive studies of nature.

== Later art ==
Also in 1926, shortly after his first watercolors, Venkatappa decided to start a painting school in Bangalore, and refused to sell his work thereon. However, he was quickly retained again by the Mysore court, gaining a contract to produce a series of bas reliefs for the Mysore Palace, then undergoing an extensive modernisation. His first bas relief, Departure of Shakuntala, was much lauded and Venkatappa was let a studio in the palace. Venkatappa delayed the completion of this series of reliefs past 1940, when the new Maharaja (who ascended following the death of his father), dispensed of his services and ordered him to vacate the palace. The bas reliefs would eventually end up at the Modern Art Gallery founded in his name by Karnakata State. He then unsuccessfully filed suit against the palace for compensation for his labour. Venkatappa had a history of litigiousness, particularly unwilling to allow for the reproduction of his art in the press. In Mysore Modern, Nair argues "the courtroom had long been the stage on which Venkatappa had striven to establish his artistic genius." Critical and short with his few students, Venkatappa did no new work after this until his death in 1965. However, even with his limited output, Venkatappa's unique placement as a skilled Indian artist working in Mysore, early Indian national art and modernism give him his relevance.

== Gallery ==
Artworks of K. Venkatappa
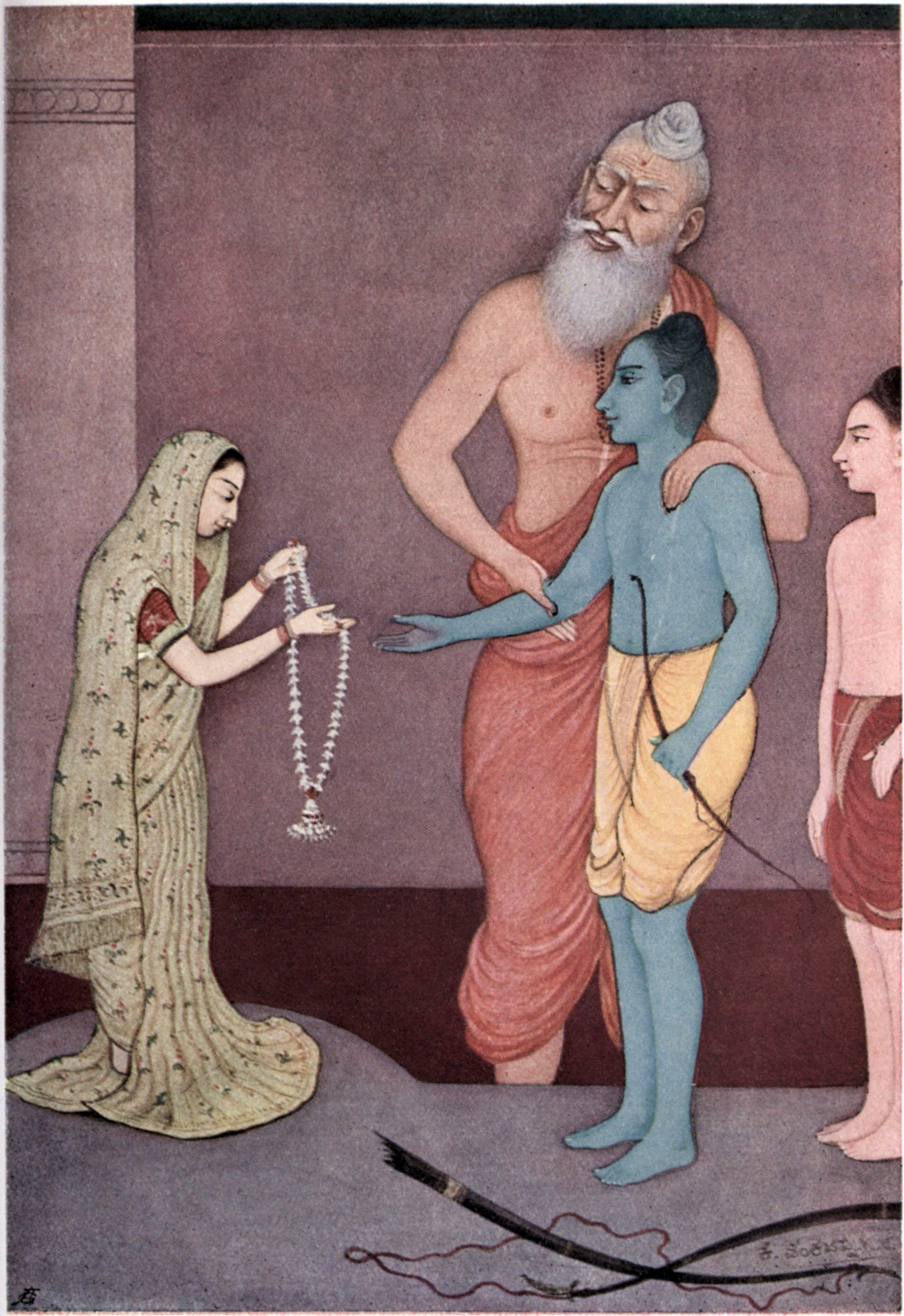
Rama's Marriage

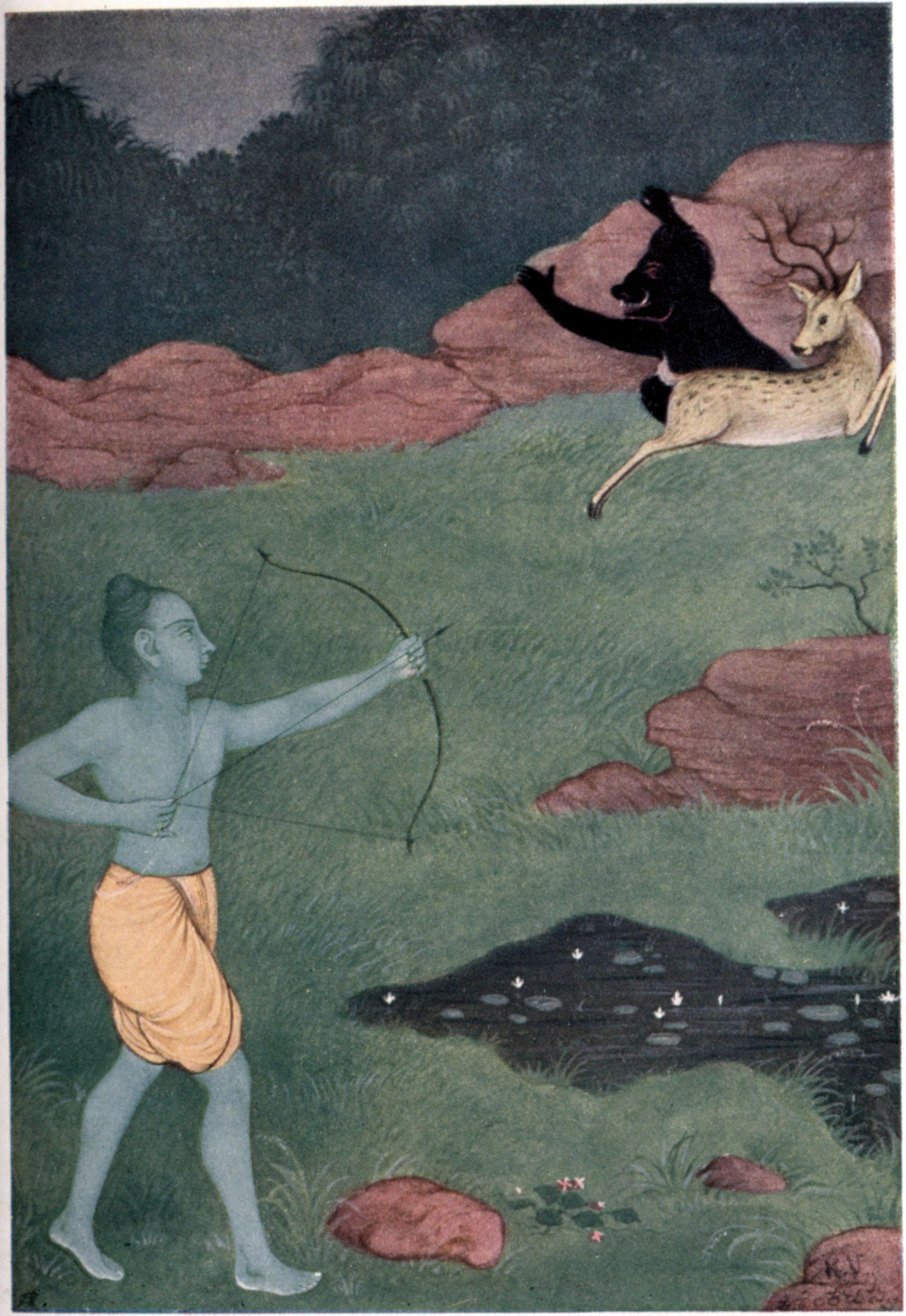
The death of Maricha

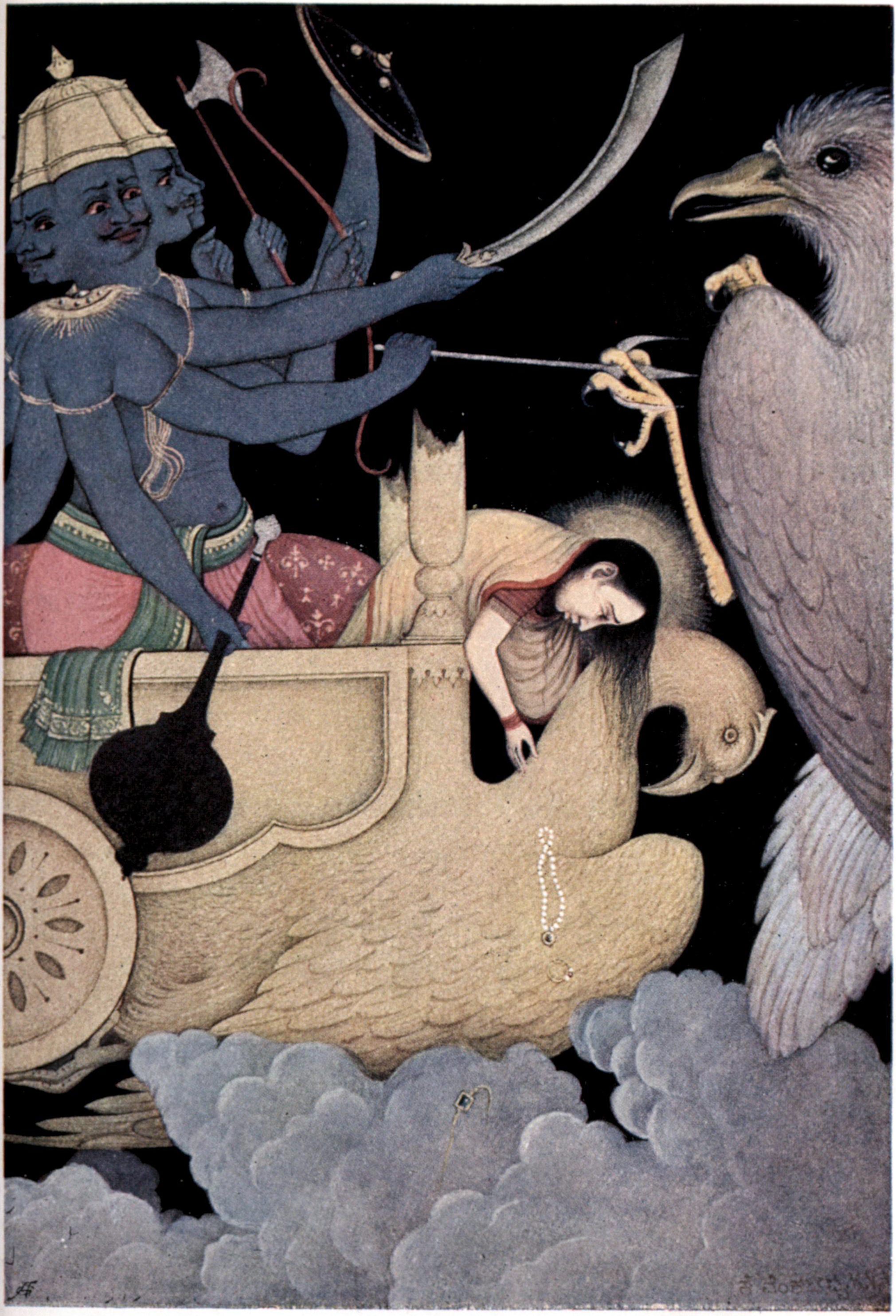
Ravana fighting with Jatayu

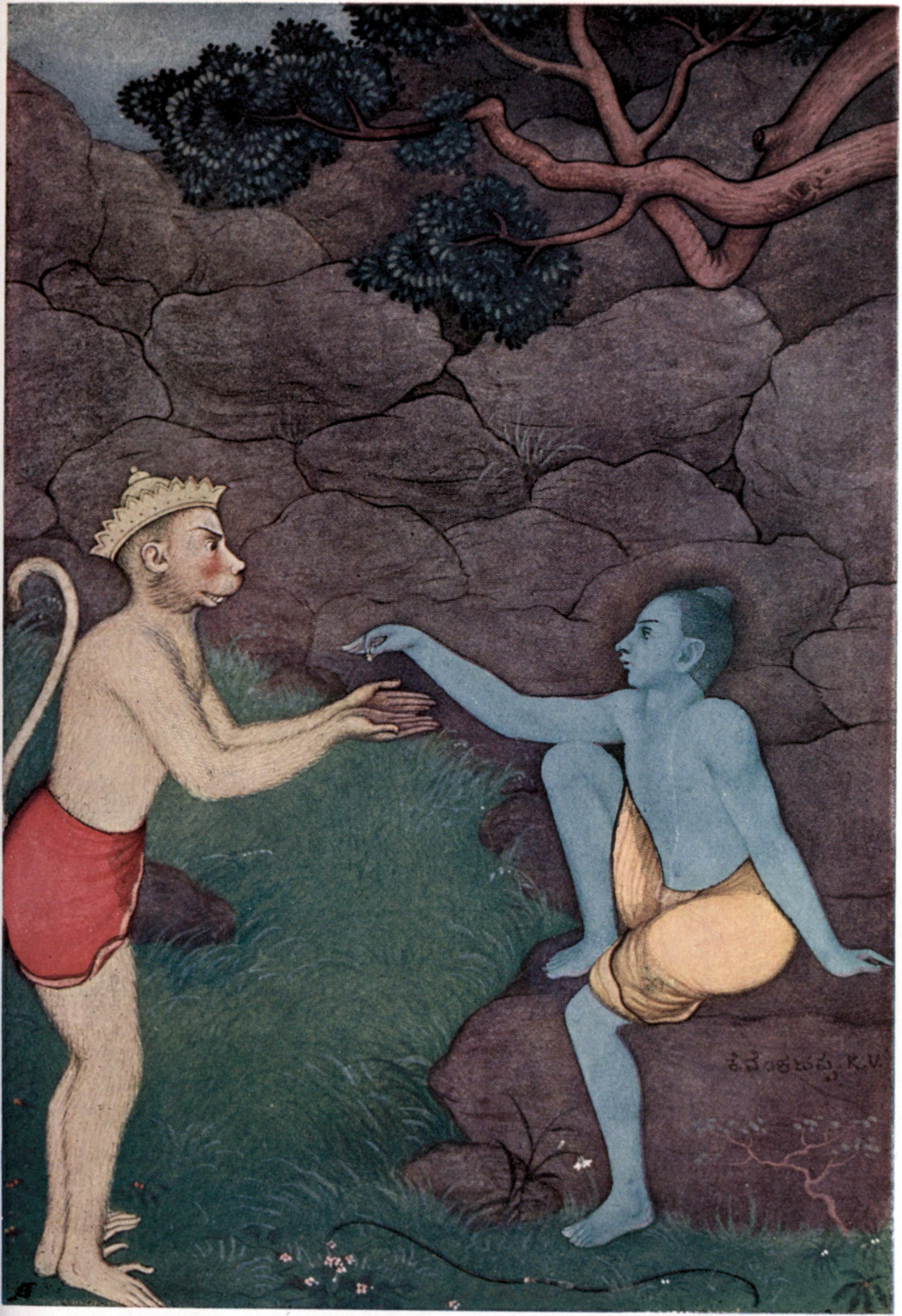
Rama sending his signet ring to Sita

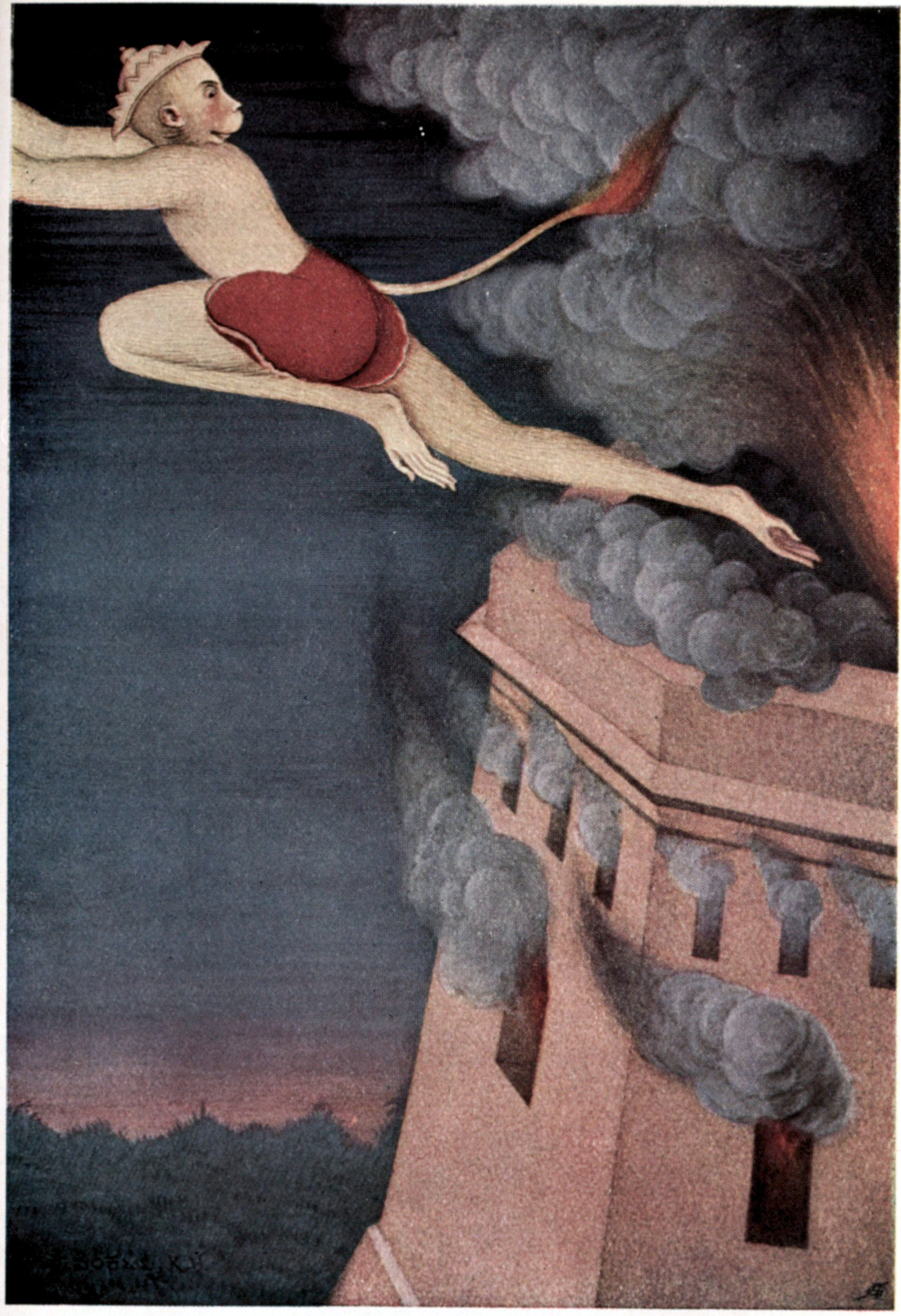
Burning of Lanka
