= Venkatappa Art Gallery =

- Venkatappa Art Gallery logo

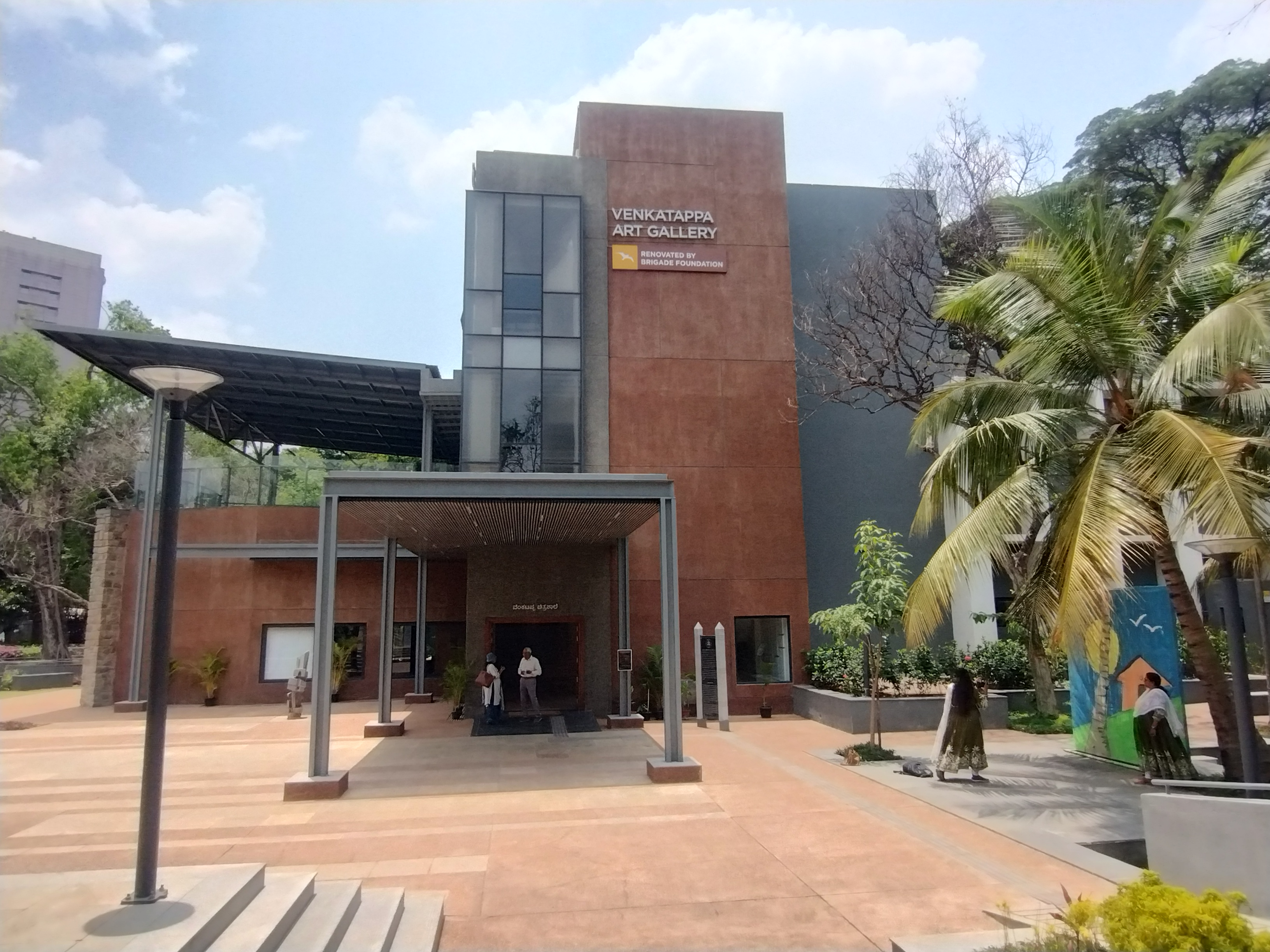
- Venkatappa Art Gallery in 2026

- Map of Karnataka showing location of Venkatappa Art Gallery
- Established: 1975
- Location: Kasturba Road, Bengaluru
- Coordinates: 12.974154°N 77.596148°E
- Type: Art gallery/museum
- Collections: Artworks created by K. Venkatappa
- Public transit access: MG Road metro station
- Website: www.venkatappaartgallery.com

Venkatappa Art Gallery (VAG) is situated in Bangalore, India, in the vicinity of Cubbon Park and next to the Bangalore Museum as well as the Visvesvaraya Industrial and Technological Museum. This art gallery showcases the artworks of artist K. Venkatappa. It attracts artists and art lovers from all over Karnataka.

== History ==
The Government of Mysore had decided in 1966 that a gallery/museum was needed that could hold the paintings, musical instruments and plaster of paris bas reliefs which formed the collection of Karnataka's most famous artist, K. Venkatappa (1886–1965), a pupil of Abanindranath Tagore.

Venkatappa Art Gallery came into being with the foundation stone being laid by the then Chief Minister S.Nijalingappa on 24 November 1967. It took a long time to complete. Artists who were frustrated with the delays went on an innovative protest on the footpath in front of Bible Society demanding the gallery space be finished in 1971. Artists included G.S Shenoy, Bhaskar Rao, Ramesh Rao, Acharya and Punam Chattaya. The building was finally completed in 1975.

It was intended to function both as a museum holding the works of K. Venkatappa as well as becoming a space for artists from all over Karnataka to use for their arts practice. VAG is commonly mistaken for the Bangalore Museum as they both stand next to each other and yet they are very different. VAG continues to be a space that accesses the contemporary holdings within it a museum as well as a gallery, something quite rare in the history of the structure of museums.

The modernist building was built by the Karnataka Public Works Department in the lines of an artificial island with a beautiful moat with a lotus pond surrounding it. This was used recently as the scene for a painting protest undertaken by VAG Forum in memory of K.Venkatappa protesting the hand over of Karnataka's cultural commons to private parties.

The plan for the museum/gallery was for five floors but only three floors have been built and the whole building has been air-conditioned.

It also houses the collections of KK Hebbar and the sculptor Rajaram. KK Hebbar, an internationally acclaimed painter from Karnataka, donated his collection to Venkatappa Art Gallery in 1993. The Government of Karnataka also bought some of his works.

The KK Hebbar Gallery wing was set up in 1993–94 with the help of Chiranjiv Singh who was the former Indian ambassador to UNESCO and artist SG Vasudev who coordinated the donation. They were helped by art historian Marishamachar. The gallery space was renovated in 2004-5 by Rekha Rao, artist and daughter of KK Hebbar, at a cost of 16 lakhs. They changed the flooring and installed a new lighting system.

== Media gallery ==
Venkatappa Art Gallery in 2026
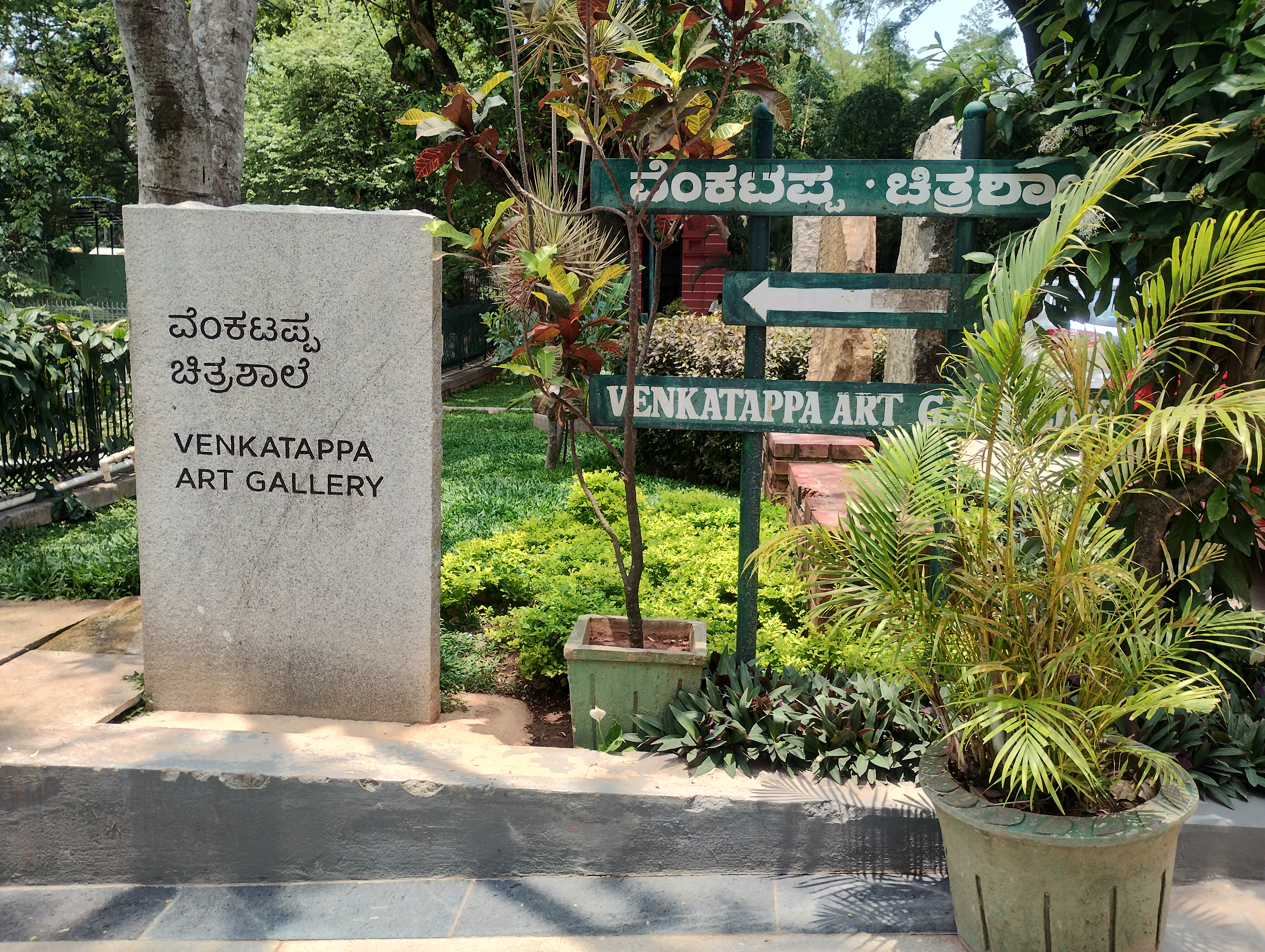

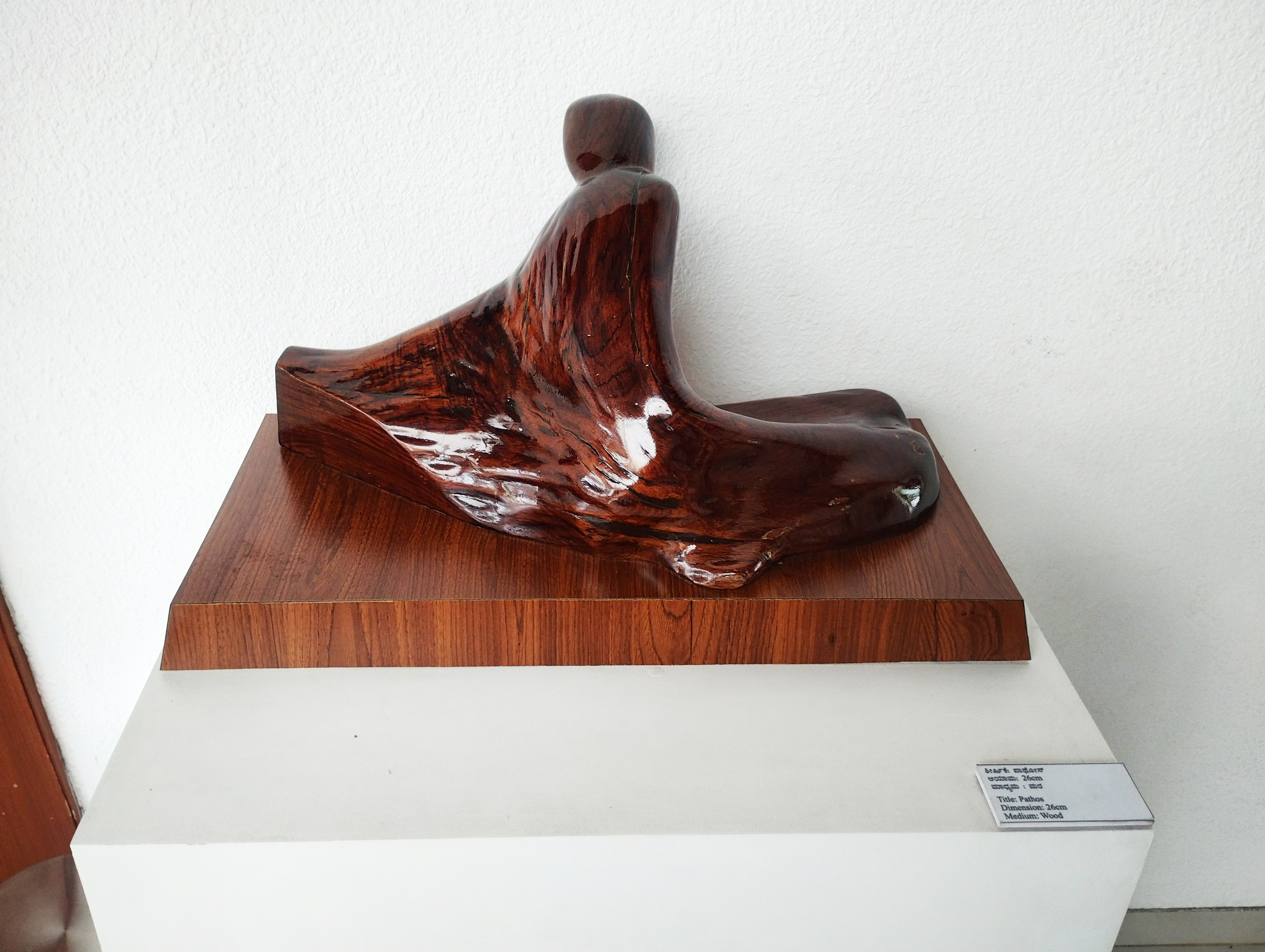

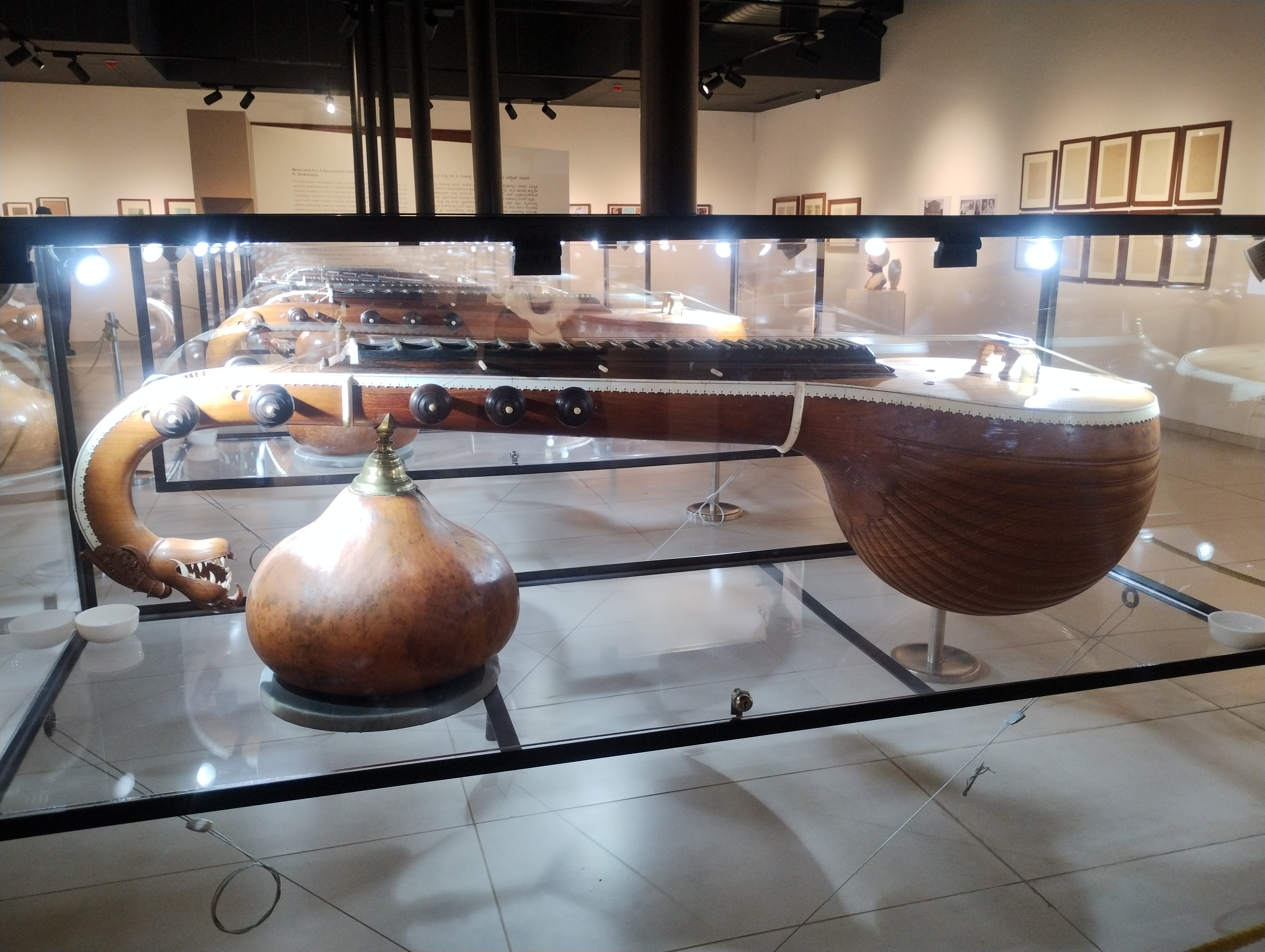

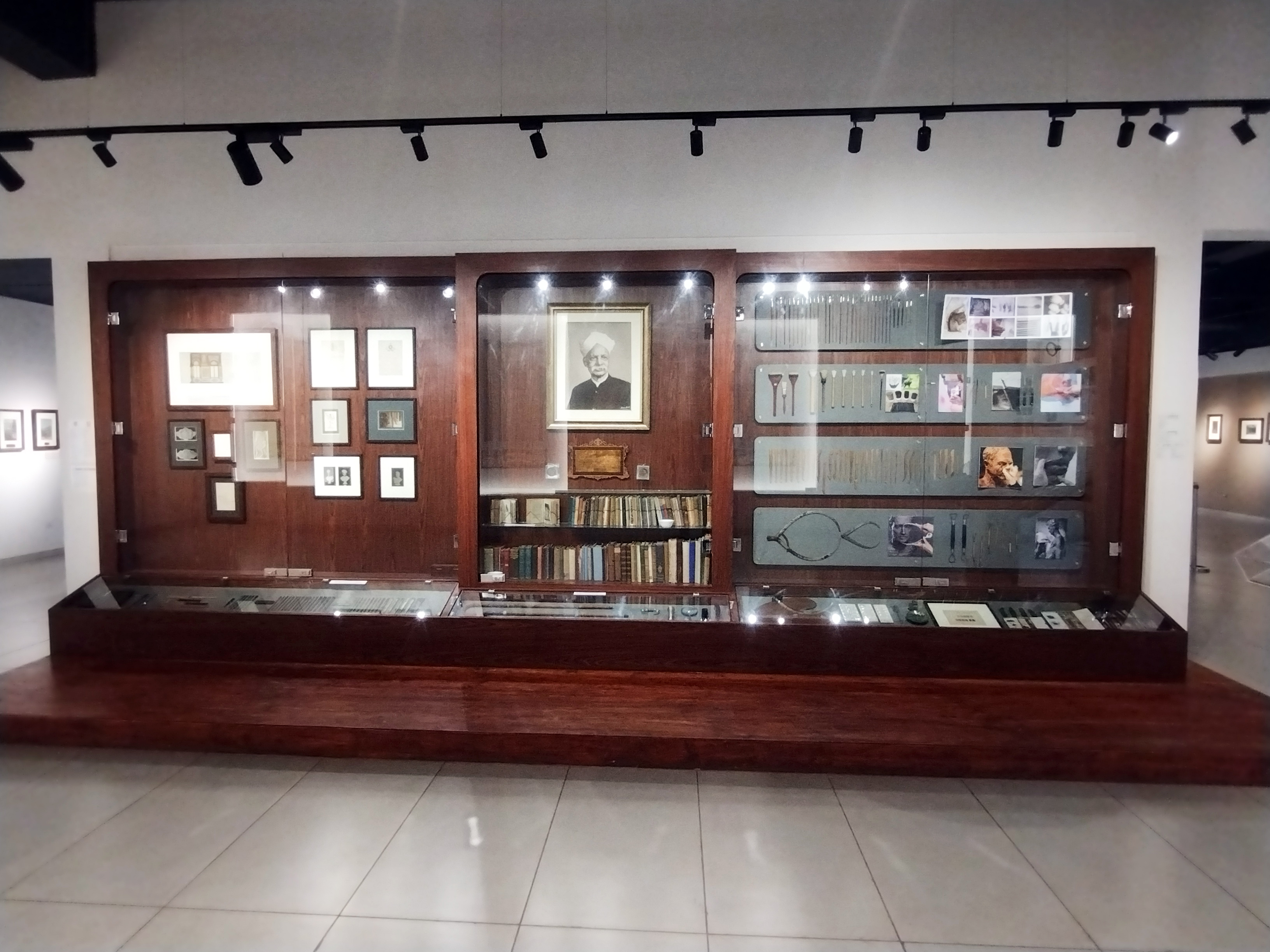

== Contemporary art ==
Contemporary artists like Pushpamala N, Sheela Gowda started off their careers with solo shows at VAG. The gallery has hosted umpteen number of group shows by students and practising artists. Eight Kala Melas, organised by Lalit Kala Academy, beginning in 1980 and through the next three decades have had great outreach and participation here at the gallery. VAG has also been the place which hosted the International live Art Festival, CoLab, India Foundation for the Arts Public art presentations and the Ananya Drishya talks by artists which have been open and free for the public.

Venkatappa Art Gallery also played host to the seventh Khoj International Artists’ Residency in Bangalore in December 2003. This brought together artists from both Bangalore and the rest of the world to enable a working together, opening up the space for new conversations, for new dialogues, new partnerships to form. This also was another important step in bringing together artists and art practitioners from the north and south of India into a collective arts conversation.

‘Silence of Furies and Sorrows – Pages of a Burning City’, was a group show with C.F. John, Raghavendra Rao, Nandakishore, Ravisankar Rao, Amrish, Shantamani, Tripura Kashyap, and Ramesh Chandra exhibited in the Venkatappa Art Gallery. This show came about as response to what was a troubling series of communal riots that rocked Bangalore in 1994.

== Controversy ==
The tourism department identified Venkatappa Art Gallery as one of the tourist sites up for ‘adoption’ around 2014–15. An MoU was signed in July 2015 between the departments of museums and archaeology and tourism and the Tasveer Foundation, which will see the complete transfer of management, curation, renovation to the private foundation. This was done without involving the larger community of artists who stake a claim to VAG as a space that has nurtured them and continues to be a space where younger artists can experiment with their practice. The controversy is further fuelled by the fact that the director of the Tasveer Foundation, Abhishek Poddar, was also a member of the Karnataka Tourism Vision Group, which recommended and set in place the process for ‘adoption’.
