= Pushpamala N. =

Visual artist (born 1956)

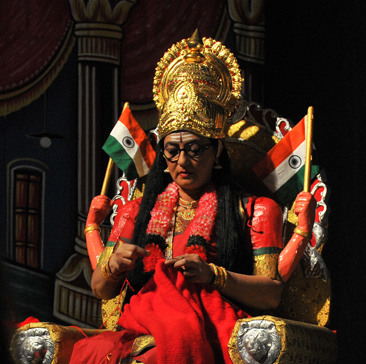
- Pushpamala N. during Khoj Live, 2012
- Born: 1956; Bengaluru, India
- Known for: Photography
- Website: pushpamala.com

Pushpamala N. (born 1956) is a photo and visual artist based in Bangalore, India.

Born in Bangalore, Pushpamala formally trained as a sculptor and eventually shifted to photography to explore her interest in narrative figuration. Pushpamala has been referred to as "the most entertaining artist-iconoclast of contemporary Indian art ". Her work has been described as performance photography, as she frequently uses herself as a model in her own work. " She is known for her strongly feminist work and for her rejection of authenticity and embracing of multiple realities. As one of the pioneers of conceptual art in India and a leading figure in the feminist experiments in subject, material and language, her inventive work in sculpture, conceptual photography, video and performance have had a deep influence on art practice in India."

== Early life and education ==
Pushpamala N. was born in Bangalore, Karnataka. She finished her bachelor's degree in Economics, English and Psychology from Bangalore University in 1977, where she studied under Balan Nambiar, an Indian artist based in Bangalore. She then studied sculpture at the Faculty of Fine Arts, Maharaja Sayajirao University of Baroda, from where she completed her bachelor's degree in 1982 and Masters in 1985. At Baroda, artists like sculptor Raghav Kaneria, Bhupen Khakhar and K.G. Subramanyan were some of her early influences.

== Work ==
Trained as a sculptor, Pushpamala N's first solo exhibition was at the Venkatappa Art Gallery, Bangalore in 1983. She used terracotta and paper mache as medium in her early works and participated in the landmark exhibition, 'Seven Young Sculptors' curated by Vivan Sundaram, exhibited in New Delhi in 1985. The demolition of Babri Masjid and the communal violence that ensued in its aftermath, especially the Bombay riots in 1992–93 heavily inspired her landmark show, 'Excavations' that was exhibited in Gallery Chemould, Mumbai, India in 1994. 'Excavations' was a conceptual shift from her earlier works as she moved from figurative sculptures to assemblages of objects made of cheap materials and thrown away papers. The project tried to look at contemporary history as an archaeological site. She explains her shift in the medium, "In my early sculptures, mainly in terracotta, I was interested in creating an indigenous language based on an essential idea of "Indianness", using poor materials and folk art references. A new language had to be used to express the sharp disjunctures and fragmentations in the tumultuous realities around us".

By later part of the 1990s, Pushpamala N. left sculpture altogether and shifted to photographic works. Often created as series, the artist refers to these photographic works as 'photo-romances'. She acknowledges that it was Bhupen Khakhar, painter and her friend who inspired her for this kind of photo performances. Using her own body to perform the various roles in these series, her 'photo-romances' borrow from popular culture, mythology and historical references interspersed with wit and humour to offer a critique of the contemporary society. "Phantom Lady or Kismet, a photo romance," presented as a solo exhibition at Gallery Chemould in 1998, the artist created a series of noir-thriller photographs of herself alternately as a gangster's moll and a masked adventurer.

She continued with these photo-romance series with 'Sunhere Sapne' (Golden dreams) that was realized during the 1998 Khoj international workshop at Modinagar, Delhi where she tried to capture the fantasy of an average middle-class housewife, dressed in the urban uniform of housecoat and petticoat, and her alter ego, a girl in a golden frock with a bouffant hairdo. She followed it with other photo-romance series like 'Dard-e-Dil'(The Anguished Heart) in 2002, a narrative photo sequence set in Chawri Bazaar, Delhi; and 'Bombay Photo Studio' a project that she undertook from 2000 to 2003. In 2004, her project 'Native women of South India', a collaborative project of performance photography realized with British Photographer Clare Arni, looks at photography as an ethnographic tool and deconstructs the popular images of the 'native' woman.

Extending the performative aspect of the photo to video films, she made 'Paris Autumn', a work of fiction in the style of a gothic thriller, narrating the story of the artist's stay in Paris in 2005. The 35-minute film of black and white still photographs opened in Galerie Zurcher, Paris, France and has been premiered at different venues across the world. Her last film, 'Rashtriy Kheer and Desi Salad', an eleven-minute film made in 2007, was about using material from her mother's and mother-in-law's recipe books and is an ironic look at the Indian family post-independence.

Pushpamala N.'s work has often been compared to American artist Cindy Sherman's.

== Prizes ==
She is the recipient of many honours, including a National Film Award (1984); a gold medal at the Sixth Triennale, India (1986); a Charles Wallace Trust Fellowship (1992–93); a Senior Fellowship at the Indian Ministry of Human Resource Development (1995–97) and an Arts Collaboration Grant from the India Foundation for the Arts (2000).

== Selected exhibitions ==
2019

The Body Politic – photographs, video, and sculpture, Nature Morte Gallery, New Delhi, India

2015

Khamoshi ki Daastan- Vadehra Art Gallery, New Delhi, India

2013

Poses and Views- A Group Exhibition, Nature Morte Gallery, Berlin, Germany

2012

The Return of the Phantom Lady (Sinful City), The Oberoi, Gurgaon, India

Avega- The Passion, Nature Morte Gallery, New Delhi, India

2010

Spiral Jetty- A group show with Abishek Hazra, Josh PS, Jeffrey Schiff, Anita Dube, Pushpamala N., and Seher

2008

Paris Autumn – video and photo installation, Bose Pacia Gallery, New York City;

2007

Indian Photo and Media Art: A Journey of Discovery, Fluss, Vienna, Austria

Post Object, Doris McCarthy Gallery, University of Toronto, Canada

Private/ Corporate IV, DaimlerChrysler Contemporary, Berlin, Germany

House of Mirrors, Grosvenor Vadehra Gallery, London

2006

India Express, Helsinki City Art Museum, Finland

Paris Autumn, Galerie Zurcher, Paris

Native Women of South India, Bose Pacia Gallery, New York

Another Asia, Noorderlicht Photofestival 2006, Netherlands

2005

Yokohama Triennale, Open Circle, Japan

Fiction, Love, Shanghai, China

2004

Edge of Desire, Art Gallery of Western Australia, Perth, Australia

2003

City Park, Projects Art Centre, Dublin, Ireland

Phantom Lady and Sunhere Sapne, Walsh Gallery, Chicago

The Anguished Heart, Gallery Nature Morte and Gallery Chemould, British Council, Delhi

2001

Century City, Tate Modern, London
