= Varnashilpi Venkatappa Award =

Painting award in Karnataka, India

Varnashilpi Venkatappa Award is an award conferred annually by the Government of Karnataka, India, for excellence in painting.

MJ Kamalakshi (Art) got the award in 2025. Noted sculptor G.L.N. Simha Varnashilpi Venkatappa award for 2022–23.
