= Mohan Samant =

Indian painter and musician

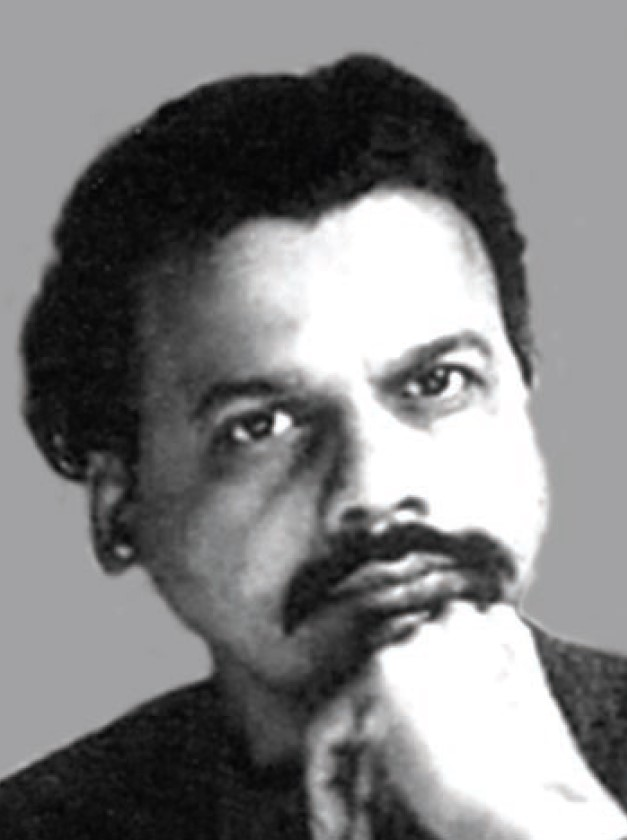
- Born: Manmohan Balkrishna Samant; 1924; Bombay Presidency, British Raj
- Died: 2004 (aged 79–80); New York City, U.S.
- Education: Sir J. J. School of Art, Mumbai
- Known for: Painting

Mohan Samant (1924–2004) was an early Indian modernist painter and member of the Progressive Artists Group. He was also a lifelong player of the sarangi, an Indian bowed string instrument.

== Early years ==
Samant was born Manmohan Balkrishna Samant into a middle-class Brahmin family in Goregaon, a suburb of Mumbai (then Bombay), India, in 1924. The fourth child of eight, he grew up in a cultured environment. Samant's father, Balkrishna Ramchandra Samant, was a headmaster and his mother a homemaker. His younger sister, Vasudha Patil, an accomplished novelist, has written that their parents encouraged the family's interest in music, art, theater, movies, travel, and writing, and Samant displayed an early proficiency in and dedication to both music and the visual arts.

== Career ==
Samant received his diploma from the Sir J.J. School of Art in 1952, where he studied under S.B. (Shankar Balwant) Palsikar. In 1954 he was awarded the Governor's Prize and the silver medal for water colors at the Bombay Art Society Annual Exhibition.

In 1952, Samant joined the Progressive Artists' Group and exhibited with them in several shows, including the 1953 exhibition, Progressive Artists' Group: Gaitonde, Raiba, Ara, Hazarnis, Khanna, Husain, Samant, Gade, at the Jehangir Art Gallery, Mumbai. He also participated in the Bombay Group, a successor to the Bombay PAG. According to artist Baburao Sadwelkar, the Bombay Group, which included Samant as well as Hebbar, Ara, Chavda, Kulkarni, Laxman Pai, Har Krishnan Lall, and Sadwelkar, had "six big exhibitions [between 1957 and 1964], which were received extremely well." Samant did not mention the Bombay Group in interviews or recorded conversations, but a review from The Times of India confirms that he had works in their November 1956 exhibition.

In 1956, Samant was awarded the gold medal at the Bombay Art Society's group exhibition, another at the Calcutta Art Society show, and the Lalit Kala Akademi All India Award. That same year, he took part in the seminal exhibition, Eight Painters: Bendre, Gaitonde, Gujral, Husain, Khanna, Kulkarni, Kumar, Samant, curated by Thomas Keehn, and in the Venice Biennale. Samant spent 1957–58 in Rome on a scholarship awarded by the Italian government. In February 1959, a Rockefeller Fellowship took him to New York City, where he would remain until 1964.

Exhibitions during Samant's first New York period included what is considered the first showing of the Progressive Artists' Group in America, Trends in Contemporary Painting from India: Gaitonde, Husain, Khanna, Kumar, Padamsee, Raza, Samant, Souza, curated by Thomas Keehn and held at the Graham Gallery, New York, as well as A Collection of Contemporary Art, Art in Embassies Committee, Museum of Modern Art, New York (1961), Recent Acquisitions, Museum of Modern Art, New York (1963), and Dunn International: 102 Best Painters of the World, Beaverbrook Art Gallery, Fredericton, New Brunswick, Canada and the Tate Gallery, London (1963).

The organizers of the legendary Dunn exhibition in 1963—whose international selection committee included Alfred Barr of The Museum of Modern Art, New York and Sir Anthony Blunt, Surveyor of the Queen's Pictures—chose works by Edward Hopper, Robert Rauschenberg and Willem de Kooning, among other giants of contemporary art. Samant was one of only two newcomers included in the exhibition, and was singled out for special recognition in the Time article on the show. He was profiled again in the magazine a year later. Samant spent 1965–68 in Mumbai. In 1968, like S.H. Raza and F.N. Souza before him, he left India permanently. He settled in New York, where he continued to work and exhibit internationally. In 2000, Samant received the Asian American Heritage Award for lifetime achievement in the arts. In January 2004, not long after a retrospective in India, Samant died in New York.

== Art ==
Samant participated in the seminal international exhibitions of twentieth-century Indian modernism. Ranjit Hoskote, internationally renowned Indian poet and art critic, wrote in 2008 that Mohan Samant was "the missing link in the evolutionary narrative of contemporary art in India." As observed by Jeffrey Wechsler in his essay on Mohan Samant and his place in twentieth-century modernism, "Samant's practice was the antithesis of a signature style. Throughout his career, he delved into divergent materials and techniques and constantly shifted imagery. While some of his processes and forms can be perceived on a regular basis over long periods of time, there was no hewing to a given image, endlessly repeated." He stated that "I find that stagnation in style and the search for the same forms cause an artist to suffer an immense amount of laboriousness in his work. Samant's art is, instead, determinedly far-reaching and inquisitive, and is inspired by the whole history of human visual creativity. Samant stated straightforwardly that his sources derived from five thousand years of art from varied civilizations. These included the cave paintings of Lascaux, Egyptian wall paintings and hieroglyphs, Indian miniatures and murals, Precolumbian ceramics, African sculpture, and the modernism of Pablo Picasso, Henri Matisse, and Paul Klee."

== Personal life ==
In 1971, Samant married Jillian Saunders (born Australia), a performer on the viola da gamba and recorder.

At his spacious loft, he hosted performances by visiting Indian musicians. He also performed for friends and accompanied singers. A dedicated musician as well as artist, he practiced sarangi for three hours every morning. Afternoons were dedicated to painting. Samant and Jillian spent many Sundays at MoMA and the Metropolitan Museum of Art, where Samant would visit current exhibitions. At the Met, he would usually end up in the African or Egyptian galleries, which he found major sources of inspiration.

== Exhibitions and archives ==
From his first showing until 1953, Samant took part in exhibitions around the world, held in galleries and museums in Canada, the United States, England, India and Japan. His work is in public collections including Museum of Modern Art the Hirshhorn Museum and Smithsonian American Art Museum and the National Gallery of Modern Art
