= D. G. Kulkarni =

Indian painter (1921–1992)

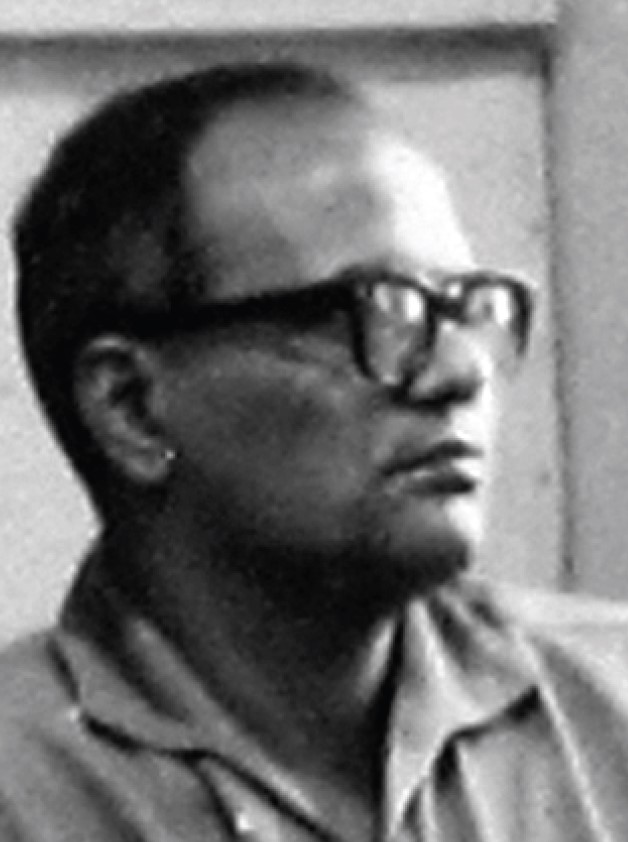
- Born: 28 December 1921
- Died: 16 November 1992 (aged 70)
- Known for: Painting

D. G. "Dattatray Gundo" Kulkarni (1921–1992), known as Dizi, was an Indian painter, cartoonist and sculptor.

Considered "one of the most interesting Modernist artists in India", he remained independent throughout his career apart from brief affiliations with the Progressive Artists’ Group and the Bombay Group.

As a student at the Sir Jamsetjee Jeejebhoy School of Art and in the early years of his career, D. G. worked as a part-time illustrator and cartoonist to support his passion for painting. It was at this time that he acquired the sobriquet Dizi.

Dizi's versatility as an artist is reflected in the three distinct media he explored – drawings, paintings and sculpture. His work reflects an honesty of expression rather than a desire for external approval. His closest friends and contemporaries in the art world, V. S. Gaitonde and S. B. Palsikar, shared this philosophy that their artistic integrity must never be compromised.

Dizi received the Lalit Kala Akademi Award in 1967 and the Maharashtra Gaurav Puraskar in 1990.

== Style ==
Nina Rege, assistant director, Nehru Centre Art Gallery, states: "Dizi was not only a master painter, but also a master sculptor, caricaturist and a poet. Generally, an artist becomes famous because of his style. But when his style and his personality mirror each other, he is a different artist altogether, Dizi was one such artist. He was different. A contemporary of the Progressive group of artists. Yet he was a rebel with his own independent style."

Jehangir Sabavala reminisced: "It wasn’t as an illustrator or as a cartoonist that he ever came into his own. Unquestionably, his inclination was towards a more serious aspect of art, which, obviously in his case, first led him to painting. In his earlier days, the palette was bright, more colourful, gayer, lighter, which he eschewed as he grew into a more mature man and painter. He left it behind in favour of a more sombre representation where, I think, the lighter, more lyrical colour was put aside and he went into deeper and more restricted tones. Also, mass, form and volume became very important to him. He simplified the paintings, and they became, in a way, monumental. The legacy left behind is of one who worked seriously and for the purpose of the work itself and did not worry whether he should sell or be famous or these other tawdry aspects of the profession."

Artist Prabhakar Kolte observes: "You cannot read his paintings as you would a contemporary artist’s. You have to make a concerted effort to read them by forgetting your own language and script since you have to understand the graphic mood of his lines which were not meant to be tools of expression but ends in themselves."

Professor V. M. Sholapurkar, Founder Dean of CAVA (Chamarajendra Academy Of Visual Arts) comments: "Viewing Dizi’s paintings bestows an illuminating glimpse of the world he chose to inhabit. His work may not be acceptable to all but it is an authentic documentation of what the art world considers a vigorous, sensitive, independent and iconoclastic mind. If one were to see Dizi’s works, untitled and unsigned, it would be difficult to tell that they were all by the same artist. His ceaseless quest for new forms and style; constant experimentation; lack of stereotypes; perfection in drawing and composition and an instinctive understanding of colours stamp him as an enduring and fascinating master artist."

Art historian and former Honorary Director of the National Gallery of Modern Art, Mumbai, Dr. Saryu Doshi concludes: "The life and works of Dizi provide insightful glimpses into the art scene of his times and serve as a valuable documentation of uncharted areas in Mumbai’s art history."

== Early life ==
Dizi was born in Shedbal village, Karnataka in 1921 to a family of impoverished landowners. He was a lonely child who exhibited a raw intensity and eagerness to learn and create. A teacher in the village school recognized his potential and invited him to share his library. Words and images became poems in the child's mind and the pen that inked the poems gradually began to transform words into lines drawn from his visual memory that were his to move and compose at will.

== Career ==
=== Mumbai, 1939-1971 ===
==== A cartoonist's wit, an artist's sensitivity ====
Dizi came to Mumbai in 1939 and began his studies in drawing and painting at the Sir J. J. School of Art. As he absorbed the cadence of life in the city, he was engulfed by the surging tide of nationalism and participated in the Quit India movement in 1942. His patriotic fervour earned him a prison sentence, serious injuries and a lifelong limp. On his release, he returned to his studies and completed his diploma. Poverty did not concern him; his wealth was in the hours spent painting and with kindred spirits K. H. Ara, V. S. Gaitonde, M. F. Husain, S. B. Palsikar, S. H. Raza and F. N. Souza.

"During this unsettled and self-supporting student’s life, I let myself flow with the country’s social and political current. I came across men, and political apes alike, who drove me to find my own values. These encounters made me realize that creativity, expressed through art, is more dynamic and satisfying than any social, political or individual existence. Life is exciting, exhilarating, intoxicating, but with its full measure of pain." – Dizi

In 1951, Dizi married Alaka. An artist herself – a sitarist – she understood with sensitivity that the man and the artist in Dizi were two distinct, yet inseparable entities. Together, Alaka and Dizi traveled through the villages and towns of India, studying ancient cave and temple sculptures and contemplating the folklore of generations. The landscapes Dizi traversed and the traditions he encountered were his inspiration. His sketchbook was an extension of himself and the impressions he drew were extensions of his imagination, stroked with confidence and conviction.

"My journey is a kaleidoscope of verdant foliage, sunbaked earth tones, the crimson, saffron and indigo swirl of turban, loincloth and sari. The rippling contours and primal energy of horses and cattle – fleeting, yet powerful impressions, a subconscious harvest." – Dizi

His work affirms the freedom of expression that was his birthright; his drawings and cartoons mirror the moments and experiences he made his own.

==== The labyrinth Of colours ====
While cartoons provided income and sustenance, Dizi yearned to transcend pure drawing and explore the realm of colour. His early paintings of faces and figures were experiments in proportion, characterized by a strong cursive line and spontaneous brushwork. Portrayed in ochre, green and rust, enlivened by white and a generous measure of red they feature almond-shaped eyes below a straight brow, elongated fingers and feet.

Richard R. Brettell's essay on ‘Rest’ (1945) in the Robert Lehman Collection of the Metropolitan Museum of Art, New York, states: "Although the picture is firmly rooted in the tradition of Indian painting in the vibrancy of its palette and the exaggeration of the eyes of the figures as repositories of special significance, elements of the composition also reflect DIZI’s professional training as a modern artist in what was then the leading professional art school in India’s largest city. The fluid lines, interpenetrating forms, and studied informality of the image suggest that he was familiar with the work of such Western Modernists as Picasso, Matisse and Dufy."

The primitive yielded to the sentimental and refined. ‘Sitar Player’, a portrait of Alaka reflects the miniature tradition as does another work titled ‘Prayer’. These paintings are composed with delicate precision in the Indian decorative style. They represent Dizi's investigation into the relationship between color and line, giving him an intuitive feeling for space and form and an instinctive sense of the use and application of appropriate colour pigments.

The momentum of executing these newly discovered concepts was broken by an acute shortage of funds. Despite this bitter reality, Dizi could neither bring himself to succumb to a complacent, static aesthetic for the sake of patronage nor surrender the free-flowing stream of creative growth that was his sole possession. In these desperate times, Emily Meeker, an American art enthusiast residing in Mumbai, introduced Dizi's work to Mumbai's expatriate community and asked if he would consent to teach her and a group of her friends to paint. An art class was organized at the Meeker residence, offering Dizi a measure of economic respite.

==== Experiment to conviction ====
"I don’t follow any school... consciously reject mannerisms, and I take almost all the pictorial values from Indian masters and Western artists." – Dizi, 1959

Dizi belonged to a new generation of artists who sought to express themselves in a modern initiative that knew no inhibitions. They broke free of the traditions imposed by academicism and innovated while continuing to respect the aesthetic grace of Indian art forms and the richness of myth. Cézanne, Dubuffet, Kandinsky, Klee, Matisse, Picabia and Picasso inspired their quest for a contemporary approach to visual interpretation and expression.

The solitude Dizi had deliberately imposed on himself since childhood had nurtured an understanding of the human predicament. His source of inspiration was his inner universe, the mind space between the curtain and backdrop of life's theatre.

"Emotions are transitory. I try to capture the sensation of an ecstatic moment on the canvas I am working on but this is a futile exercise. The dark landscapes of my childhood impose themselves on my palette and I paint grotesque, disproportionate figures on multi-dimensional planes, abstract reflections of a troubled past. I pause, lay down my brush and write to expel the turmoil that prevents me from painting what I had intended to. It takes a concerted effort and Alaka’s unstinting support to bring myself back to brighter hues and a serenity of spirit that prompts me to create a series of translucent watercolors. Even as I work on these, my mind is journeying beyond." – Dizi

==== Symbolism and significance ====
When Alaka and Dizi married, they decided they would not have a child as their lives were too unconventional to accept this responsibility. Perhaps it was this that prompted Dizi to muse: "I find myself exploring adolescence, sensuality, womanhood, the concept of mother and child, of burgeoning life. I paint symbols of fertility with a need that borders on desperation. It is almost as though I anticipate and experience fatherhood through the layers of pigment that bring the images born of primeval desire in my mind to life."

In this quest for perpetuity, he found himself reaching out to the familiar reassurance of myth and philosophy and painted a series projecting the origins of life and symbols of the mystic Indian inheritance.

The cartoonist in Dizi enabled him to infuse dramatic and literary content into his paintings. The Clown Series, exhibited in 1963, envisioned a world of fantasy and caprice in which myth and illusion are interspersed with harsh, inescapable reality. The theme of these paintings mutates subtly and imperceptibly between the whimsical antics of the circus ring and the mysterious and magical impact of symbols. Embarking on this creative adventure, Dizi painted in tumultuous colours.

"The clowns parade on the screen of my mind. Their spontaneous, merry capers momentarily dispel the barren emptiness of disappointment and the anguish of experience. Masked and garbed in blithe dots, lines and patches they simulate the pattern and parody of human existence." – Dizi

Art critic Dr. Charles Louis Fabri's review of the exhibition stated: "D. G. Kulkarni’s talent is too obvious to be missed. He is interesting, original... a fine draughtsman who refuses to give up representation for abstraction. The clown is shown in many shapes and his motley dress forms the justification for the many colours."

Influenced by Paul Klee's work and thoughts on art, an element of surreal fantasy and a focus on the concept of metamorphosis evolved in Dizi's work in the wake of the clown theme.

"Klee’s words resonate as my brush caresses canvas. I mix and manipulate paint to lure powerful images from invisible realms of mystic introspection. Pigments are intensified and muted to evoke emotions from subliminal depths, illustrate evolution, expose nature’s stark reality and uninhibitedly bare its lyrical and gruesome aspects in a spectrum of vivid, glowing colors. I feel I have transcended the barriers of attitude and approach in this work that is symbolic evidence of my inner growth." – Dizi

==== Man and woman – the eternal theme ====
Dizi's work explores the relationship between man and woman; the aspects of sexuality, love, tenderness, violence, ambiguity, celebration and spirituality that are the core of this equation.

Life urged Dizi to reinvent himself, to equate joyous triumphs and despairing frustrations, to define uncharted paths of visual exploration and discovery while adhering stubbornly and determinedly to his beliefs and convictions.

=== Belagavi, Karnataka 1971–1977 ===
==== Philosopher and individualist ====
In 1971, Dizi and Alaka returned to their roots in rural Karnataka, moving from Mumbai to live on a farm in the Belagavi district. Here, Dizi rediscovered nature and the palette of his youth, but the man he had become chose to strip away the bright, vibrant colors that had appealed to him until now. His brush mixed deeper and more restricted tones and his compositions became more complex.

The Dizi of this period was a different person. As the monsoon rain washed away the parched red dust, obscuring the brown, green and blue of earth, tree and sky, he chose to see only the various shades of grey engendered by cloud shadows.

In 1974, deliberately avoiding even a vestige of colour, he created the Grey Series, restricting himself to painting pure form in grey, white and black. Professor V. M. Sholapurkar comments: "Dizi let his imagination wander at will in a monochromatic world of plants, insects, birds and nascent beings in which subconscious imagery emerged from conscious observation. He painted phallic symbols, eggs and embryos with a bold confidence. These sombre paintings exhibit a sophisticated, restrained elegance. Bird Whistle features delicately stroked diagonals balanced by an aerodynamic horizontal; assorted symbols cluster amid dark masses in Dampness and Abode of Butterflies depicts the fragility of life struggling with the elements."

Dizi felt the need to leave behind the colour pigments he had ground, mixed and applied to paper and canvas and to experience the character of stone by sculpting it into the archetypal images he visualized emerging from the landscape before him. Sculpture offered him a means of penetrating life's core to produce simple yet powerful forms.

"It is the three-dimensional effect of the sculpture and the raw feel of the medium that is thrilling. The colour in paintings is illusory. In sculpture there is more reality. Above all, I love the challenge in the toughness, the roughness, the pure texture of stone." – Dizi

Professor V. M. Sholapurkar writes: "We do not know what primordial instincts brought Dizi finally to stone for the culmination of his vision... his superb linear drawings contain subconscious suggestions of the voluptuousness of form that could only find fulfilment in stone of varied hues and tactile possibilities."

Noted art critic Dnyaneshwar Nadkarni remarked: "Translating his ideas into stone the artist gives them an inevitability of form and substance. Dizi’s carving technique has many definitions and expertise. The contours, the placement of motifs, the total shape – everything is so appropriate... the general sweep of the bigger works... the blending of grace and weight."

=== Mumbai, 1977-1992 ===
==== An artist's legacy ====
"We have all chosen a journey that, while fraught with uncertainty, gives our creative nature the courage to endure in the promise of inner fulfilment." – Dizi

Line and form continued to fascinate Dizi as he strove for deeper levels of interpretation. He reflected on mass, form and volume, the interpenetration of lines and shapes. Colors awakened in his mind, urging rediscovery after his pilgrimage in grey and his palette began to respond to their insistent call. The later compositions he painted were more thoughtful and assured. Forms and colors adjust themselves in these works, emerging, overlapping, disappearing.

Dizi's journey as an artist began with the inexpressible thrill of discovering the magical intrigue of line as pen and ink brought it indelibly alive. As he turned seventy, the artist in him reverted to the cartoonist in a moment of nostalgia creating the sentimental portraits of his friends and fellow artists.

The portraits depict Husain striding barefoot on a city road with his canvases; Souza painting buxom nudes; Hebbar sketching to capture an instant of inspiration; Gaitonde seated, lost in contemplative reflection; Palsikar, garbed in sacred thread and red silk dhoti, engaging in ritual and Ara posing with a child.

Art critic Niyatee Shinde observed: "As is typical of his nature, his modesty and witty temperament, he has on display portraits of his contemporaries like F. N. Souza, Gaitonde etc. What one finds more than amusing is the dexterity with which he has captured the subtle distinctions that ideally characterize these fellow painters. These unpretentious images from his witty world open up a playful world that also interestingly revives the nostalgic. Simple fluid lines and an equally unencumbered palette make for pleasing visuals.",

Artist Suhas Bahulkar recounts: "He struggled throughout his life to live as an artist. As his life progressed, the fragile yet resolute finesse of his initial line drawings was translated into powerful colour schemes on canvas. These, in time, were to be replaced by the stones he would carve into equally massive forms chiselled to perfection with intricate, decorative lines to make his artistry come full circle."

Dizi always remained true to the values he had imposed on himself and expressed his true self when he painted. His creativity was never restrained or curbed by external incentives.

"I know the ropes but never handled them, never wanted to. I found the strings but never pulled them. It is mechanical. But I found the line, the thrilling line and I followed the adventure. I found myself and my peace. In the melody of lines I swim. To the rhythm of line I dance the cosmic dance." – Dizi

Dizi died in Mumbai on 16 November 1992.

== Awards ==
1956 Bombay State Award, Mumbai

1967 Lalit Kala Akademi Award, New Delhi

1972 Maharashtra State Award, Mumbai

1990 Maharashtra Gaurav Puraskar, Mumbai

== Selected solo and group exhibitions ==
1946 Group Exhibition, Bombay Art Society, Mumbai

1948 Solo Exhibition, Mumbai

1950 Solo Exhibition, Mumbai

1958 Group Exhibition, Bombay Art Society, Mumbai

1959 Solo Exhibition, Jehangir Art Gallery, Mumbai

1961 Solo Exhibition, Jehangir Art Gallery, Mumbai

1963 Solo Exhibition, Clown Series, Roopa Art Gallery, Mumbai

1964 AIFACS, New Delhi

1965 Taj Art Gallery, Mumbai

1966 Academy of Fine Arts, Kolkata

1976 Solo Exhibition, Grey Series, Jehangir Art Gallery, Mumbai

1978 Solo Exhibition, Jehangir Art Gallery, Mumbai

1981 Solo Exhibition, Jehangir Art Gallery, Mumbai

1983 Solo Exhibition, Jehangir Art Gallery, Mumbai

1985 Solo Exhibition, Jehangir Art Gallery, Mumbai

1987 Solo Exhibition, Jehangir Art Gallery, Mumbai

1991 Solo Exhibition, Jehangir Art Gallery, Mumbai

== Retrospective exhibitions ==
1993 Memorial Exhibition, Jehangir Art Gallery, Mumbai

2000 Millennium Show ‘A Century of Art from Maharashtra’, Nehru Centre, Mumbai

2001 Nehru Centre Pays Tribute to D. G. Kulkarni (DIZI) ‘The Indian Master Painter, Sculptor & Cartoonist’, Nehru Centre Art Gallery, Mumbai

== Works in notable institutions and collections ==
National Gallery of Modern Art, Mumbai

The Metropolitan Museum of Art, Robert Lehman Collection, New York

Dizi Kulkarni Foundation
