= Jehangir Art Gallery =

Art gallery in Mumbai, India

Coordinates: 18.9274559°N 72.831703°E

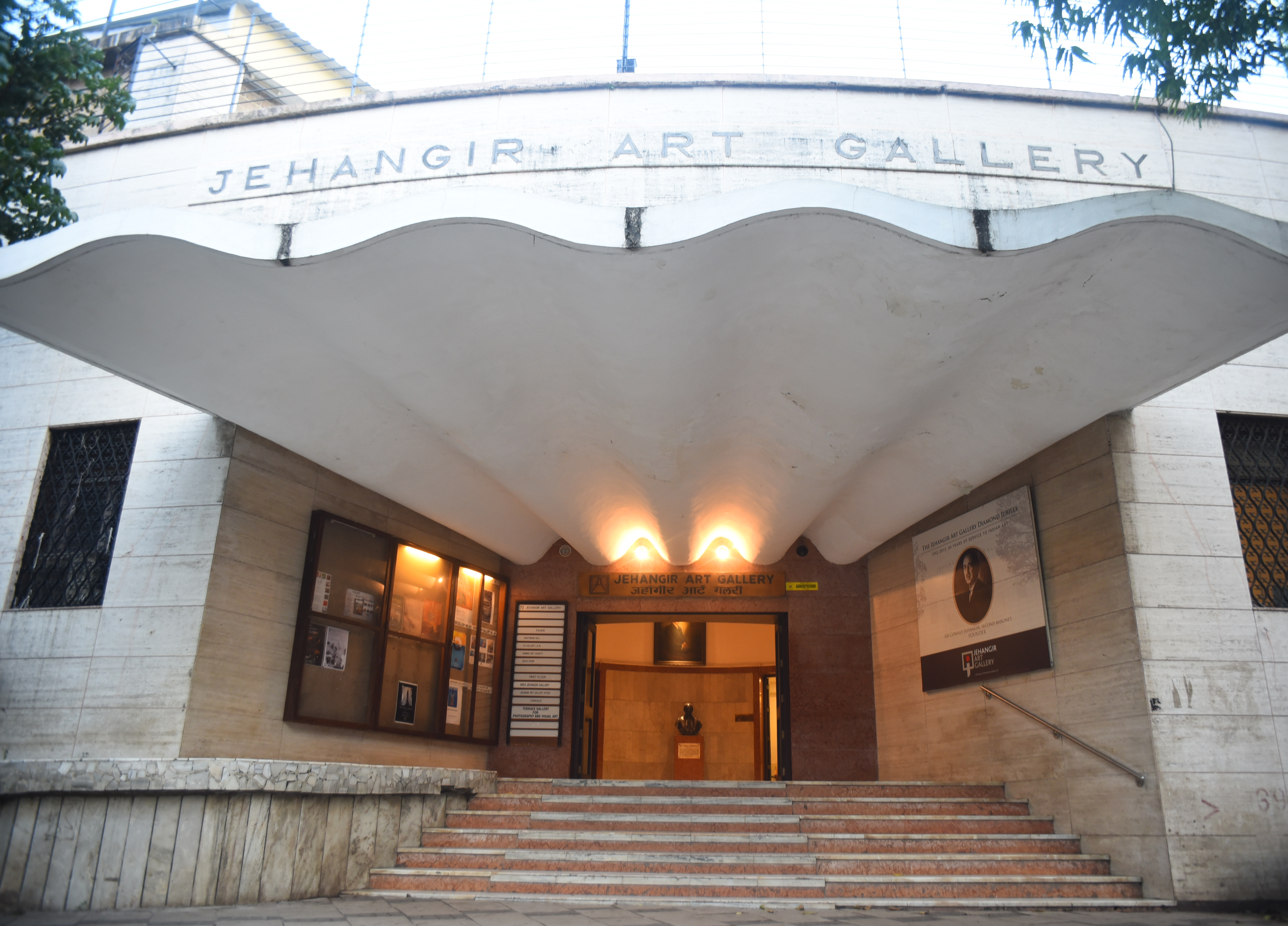
- Established: 1952
- Location: Mumbai, India
- Type: Art Gallery
- Website: https://jehangirartgallery.com/

Jehangir Art Gallery is an art gallery in Mumbai (India). It was founded by Sir Cowasji Jehangir at the urging of K. K. Hebbar and Homi J. Bhabha. It was built in 1952. Managed by the Committee of Management, the entire cost of this mansion was donated by Cowasji Jehangir. This gallery is situated at Kala Ghoda, behind the Chhatrapati Shivaji Maharaj Vastu Sangrahalaya, in South Mumbai near the Gateway of India, and has four exhibition halls. The gallery was designed by G.M. Bhuta for G.M. Bhuta & Associates. The gallery closed for 11 months as a part of the COVID-19 lockdown in India and was partially re-opened on 16 February 2021. It has since been fully re-opened.

== History ==
The gallery was inaugurated on 21 January 1952, by then Chief Minister of Bombay State, B. G. Kher and dedicated it to the memory of Sir Cowasji's late son, Jehangir. A mammoth institution in itself, its history is linked with the renaissance of Indian art. The complex was also home to the popular cafe of Samovar, which was reminiscent of the 1970s socialist culture. It also houses Natesans, the country's oldest licensed antique dealers. Entry is free of charge.

== Architecture ==
The building has been designed by Durga Bajpai and is one of the early concrete structures in the city. The gallery has been turned inwards due to a combined function of an auditorium and an art gallery. Although the concept of an introvert art gallery could be questioned today, the Jehangir is an example of an early modernist notion of the inward looking art galleries in the city. Moreover, the function of the auditorium left no scope for the gallery to be open to the street. The play with concrete can be easily seen with a large wavy cantilevered entrance which embraces the street. The otherwise bland facade is articulated with relief stone cladding.

== In popular culture ==
The art gallery and the Samovar restaurant were featured in the 1975 Bollywood film Chhoti Si Baat. The art gallery is visible in the 1987 Tamil film Nayakan.
