= Kekoo Gandhy =

Indian art gallery owner (1920–2012)

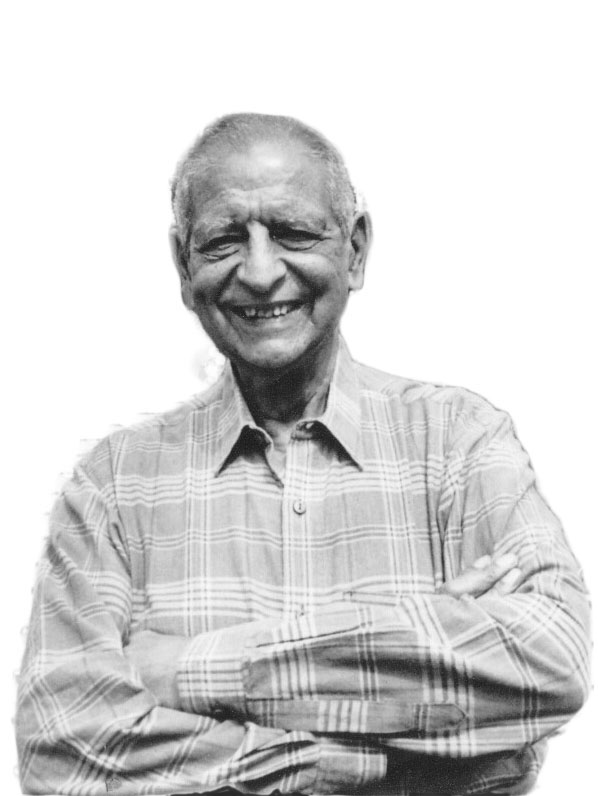
- Born: Kaikhushru Minochair Gandhy; 2 February 1920; Bombay, Bombay Presidency, British India (present-day Mumbai)
- Died: 10 November 2012 (aged 92); Mumbai, Maharashtra, India
- Occupations: Gallerist, gallery chemould (established 1963), art collector and art connoisseur
- Spouse: Khorshed Adenwalla (m. 1944)
- Children: Rashna, Adil, Behroze, Shireen Gandhy
- Awards: Padma Shri in 2008
- Website: gallerychemould.com

Kekoo Gandhy (2 February 1920 – 10 November 2012) was an Indian art gallerist, art collector and art connoisseur, who pioneered the promotion of Indian modern art from the 1940s. He established Chemould Frames, a frame manufacturing business in 1941, soon he started displaying works of young modern artists K. H. Ara, S. H. Raza, K. K. Hebbar and M. F. Husain in his showroom windows. This led to gradual rise of modern art movement and post-colonial art in India. Eventually Gallery Chemould, India's first commercial art gallery, was opened in 1963 on the first floor of the Jehangir Art Gallery.

He was awarded the Padma Shri by Government of India in 2008.

== Life and career ==
Kaikhushru (Kekoo) Minocher Gandhy was born in Bombay on 2 February 1920 to Minocher Gandhy and Roshan Gandhy (née Roshan Batliwalla). Kekoo was educated at Bombay's Cathedral and John Connon School, from which he matriculated aged 17, gaining a place at Pembroke College, Cambridge. But after spending summer 1939 in India, Kekoo Gandhy could not return to Cambridge due to the outbreak of World War II. In 1940, Kekoo was appointed Honorary Secretary of the Bombay Art Society, the first Indian to hold the position.

In 1941, Kekoo and his brother Russy Gandhy set up the Chemical Moulding Manufacturing Company, later abbreviated to Chemould, to manufacture frames for paintings. Kekoo displayed Bombay Progressive Artists' Group paintings in Chemould's Bombay shop, which grew out of a godown on Princess Street; the Bombay Progressives made their first sales through this shop. Gallery/shop managers included Roshan Kalapesi and poet Nissim Ezekiel.

Kekoo's knack for spotting promising young talent led to exhibitions that helped establish the reputations of MF Husain, Tyeb Mehta, Ram Kumar, SH Raza, Bhupen Khakhar, Nalini Malani, Atul Dodiya, Anju Dodiya, Jitish Kallat, Reena Saini Kallat, KH Ara, Bal Chhabda, Krishen Khanna, Jehangir Sabavala, Gaitonde, KK Hebbar, Vivan Sundaram, and Jivya Soma Mashe. Immediately after his successful first Husain exhibition, in 1951, Kekoo Gandhy collaborated with industrialist and collector Cowasji Jehangir and the nuclear scientist Homi Bhabha to establish the Jehangir Art Gallery in Bombay, a first for modern art. Kekoo established Gallery Chemould in 1963 on the first floor of the Jehangir Art Gallery, holding exhibitions there until 2007, when it moved to its new premises on Prescott Road.

Starting in the 1970s, Kekoo Gandhy was instrumental in developing the former Sir Cowasji Jehangir Public Hall in Bombay into the present National Gallery of Modern Art, Mumbai. At various times Kekoo also actively supported the Lalit Kala Akademi (National Academy of Fine Arts) and Triennale India 1968.

As part of his commitment to the social sphere, Kekoo Gandhy sheltered activists in his home during the Indian Emergency (26 June 1975 – 21 March 1977). And during the Hindu fundamentalist Bombay riots (December 1992 – January 1993) he was active in the mohalla (neighbourhood) committees that worked for inter-religious solidarity. After working with him for a few years, in 1988, his daughter Shireen Gandhy took over the running of Gallery Chemould. Shireen's child, Atyaan Jungalwala, and Sunaina Kewalramani established a new location in 2022 named Chemould CoLab.

For his work in the Arts, Kekoo Gandhy was awarded the Padma Shri in 2008 by Government of India. He died on 10 November 2012, at his home at Bandra bandstand in Mumbai, after a brief illness due to pancreatic cancer. He was survived by four children, Rashna, Adil, Behroze, and Shireen. His daughter Shireen Gandhy, continues to head Chemould (now Chemould Prescott Road).

In December 2013, part of Kekoo and Khorshed Gandhy's personal collection of art was sold at Christie's first auction in India. The sale included works by Gaitonde, Ram Kumar, Raza, Tyeb Mehta, MF Husain, Jamini Roy, Ganesh Pyne, and Pochkhanawala.

Kekoo Gandhy appears thinly disguised as Parsi gallery owner 'Kekoo Mody' in Salman Rushdie's The Moor's last sigh (1995).

== Bibliography ==
- "Kekoo Gandhy, The beginnings of the art movement". India-Seminar, 528.
