= Rummana Hussain =

Indian conceptual and performance artist (1952–1999)

- Born: 1952; Bengaluru, Karnataka
- Died: 5 July 1999 (aged 46–47)
- Other name: Rummana Habibullah
- Occupations: Conceptual, visual, and performance artist
- Spouse: Ishaat Hussain
- Children: 1
- Parent(s): Enaith Habibullah, Hamida Habibullah
- Relatives: Wajahat Habibullah (brother)

Rummana Hussain (1952–1999) was an Indian conceptual, visual, and performance artist best known for her multi-media and installation-based work exploring "female subjectivity trapped in discourses of family, religion, nationalism, and welfare."

Hussain's work has been displayed in museums, and galleries worldwide, including Tate Modern (London), National Gallery of Modern Art (Mumbai), Smart Museum, (Chicago), Barbican Centre (London), Kiran Nadar Museum of Art (Mumbai), Fowler Museum (Los Angeles), Museum Abteiberg (Germany), Ackland Art Museum (North Carolina), Gallery of Mississauga (Canada), Asia Society (New York), Museum of Contemporary Art (Mexico), Tamayo Museum (Mexico), Queens Museum (New York), Vancouver Art Gallery (Canada), Rose Art Museum, (Massachusetts), Institute of Arab and Islamic Art (New York) and Talwar Gallery (New York) which represents the estate of the artist. Her work is part of the Queensland Art Gallery's permanent collection.

== Biography ==
Hussain was born in Bengaluru, India to a prominent Muslim family with aristocratic ancestry. Her paternal family, the Habibullahs, were taluqdars (also known as landed gentry) from Awadh's Barabanki district. Her father, Major General Enaith Bahadur Habibullah, was the first commandant of the National Defence Academy (Khadakwasla, Pune) and her mother, Hamida Habibullah, was a politician and social worker. She had two siblings: Wajahat Habibullah, a former Indian Administrative Service (IAS) officer and politician, and Nazli Siddiqui, a medical professional.

From 1972 to 1974, Hussain studied fine arts at the Ravensbourne College of Art and Design, United Kingdom.

=== 1980–1990: Introduction to the contemporary Indian art scene and explorations in figuration ===
After completing her graduation, Hussain returned to India and married Ishaat Hussain, an Indian businessman and former interim chairman of Tata Consultancy Services (TCS). Between 1983 and 1985, she lived in Kolkata, and worked with Paritosh Sen at his studio.

In the early 1985, after her husband was transferred to Bihar for work, Hussain moved to Delhi and joined Garhi Studios, a multi-disciplinary art space supported by the state-run Lalit Kala Akademi. During her four years at Garhi, she connected with other contemporary Indian artists, including painter Manjit Bawa, sculptor and textile artist Mrinalini Mukherjee, and mixed-media artist Navjot Altaf. At the time, contemporary Indian art scene veered towards the overarching trend of figuration that was principally ushered in by the "Baroda school" of painters, many of whom, including Gulam Mohammed Sheikh, Sudhir Patwardhan and Bhupen Khakhar, were affiliated with the Faculty of Fine Arts at the Maharaja Sayajirao University of Baroda, but traveled to or lived in Mumbai. Inspired by the scene, Hussain began developing her own figurative painterly practice in alignment with her social and aesthetic concerns.

Owing to The Emergency, a 21-month period between 1975 and 1977 when civil liberations were suspended by Indian Prime Minister Indira Gandhi, Hussain, like many of her fellow artists, felt necessary to use figuration as a medium to "convey and interrogate issues central to the human condition, namely violence, corruption, ritualism and exploitation." She also believed that a "semi-sculptural, figurative form" would ensure that the art was accessible to all classes, and consequently achieve greater "receptiveness."

Mukherjee and Altaf offered critiques on Hussain's neoexpressionist figurations, with the former apparently openly reprimanding her for her "bad paintings." Hussain's preoccupation with German playwright Bertolt Brecht and Dutch-Flemish painter Pieter Bruegel directly manifested in her practice, and in her painting When Evil Doing Comes Like Falling Rain, Nobody Calls Out Stop (c.1989–90) that portrays hell and human suffering through a "fiery mountain of human heads and figures with bat-like wings flying over a congested, chaotic landscape."

Similar to the works of fellow painters Nalini Malani, Nilima Sheikh and Arpita Singh, her use of "myth, metaphor and allegory contrasted with stark modern-day reality to convey social messages." However, unlike these artists, she struggled to find the "exact visual language" to best express her concerns. In Big Fish Eat Little Fish-1 (1989), meant to be a "glaringly obvious criticism of Indian capitalist and caste structures," she painted two obscure figures rowing a small boat trying to cross "a murky, treacherous sea" while a "gargantuan fish consumes its smaller brethren." Similar preoccupations are observed in The Angel and Colaba (1990) that depicts a "shadowy, aquatic landscape" mirroring the fishing docks in Colaba, Mumbai, packed with "fishermen hauling carts of produce" as domestic animals and "gaunt, scantily clad figures" occupy the neighbouring street. Across the skies and "seemingly away from the grim situation below," a "bronzed angel with glowing, fuchsia wings" is seen carrying a "darkened figure of a woman."

=== Early 1990s: Transition to installation-based work and activism with SAHMAT ===
After the 1989 murder of activist, poet and playwright Safdar Hashmi in Sahibabad, Uttar Pradesh, a group of more than sixty artists, curators, and writers, including Hussain, Manjit Bawa, Atul Dodiya, Subodh Gupta, Zarina Hashmi, Ram Rahman, Geeta Kapur, M. K. Raina, Vivan Sundaram, Bharti Kher, Pushpamala N., Nalini Malani, Nilima Sheikh, and Bhisham Sahni, formed the Safdar Hashmi Memorial Trust (SAHMAT) to promote "secularism and pluralism" in India through the arts. They staged "activist exhibitions," and mobilized "protest performances" across the country; their most notable campaigns included Artists Against Communalism (1991), a series of artist-led performances held in several cities, under which, SEHMAT mounted a touring exhibition Images and words: Artists Against Communalism (1992) comprising paintings, photographs, poems and statements from eminent artists. Hussain, who was living in Mumbai at the time, became one of SAHMAT's key local coordinators.

The late 1980s and early 1990s were marked by widespread communal violence and social unrest in India, culminating in the demolition of the 16th-century Babri Masjid in Ayodhya by Vishva Hindu Parishad and allied organisations. According to Rahman: "It was the most shocking thing that had happened at a national level in our lives. It really shattered our idea of ourselves, as a modern nation and a culture. And as artists who had a stake in that culture, it attacked every cultural mooring that we had." The demolition followed months-long communal riots across several cities leading to the deaths of 2,000–3,000 people; Mumbai was among the "worst affected" cities recording an estimated 900 deaths over six weeks. As the riots reached Mumbai, Hussain, fearing for her life and the safety of her family, removed the nameplate from outside her home, and sought refuge in a nearby hotel with her husband and young daughter. "It shocked her," Rahman recalled, "It was an invasion into her protected, personal space. Suddenly she felt as if her Muslim identity was being thrust upon her."

A few weeks later, in January 1993, Hussain participated in an interdisciplinary, seventeen-hour performance organized by SAHMAT, featuring Sufi-Bhakti music that originated during the eighth- and twelfth- century reform movements to promote "tolerance, spirituality and harmony between religions." The title of the Delhi-based event, "Anhad Garje (transl: the silence reverberates)" was inspired by the medieval poetry of Sufi saint Kabir. The following month, writing for The Independent, Hussain said: "It's necessary to emerge from our insular shells, to come together and try and develop symbols of secularism...a coming together of artists and viewers is a form of public participation, one that emphasizes the commonality of all." During the event, Hussain, accompanied by Sundaram and Altaf, created "a cosmic river in the sky" on the roof of the tented venue, and inscribed poetry and calligraphy on the walls.

==== Fragments/Multiples (1994) ====
After returning from Anhad Garje, Hussain began working with terracotta pots to create "sensuous new installations" for Fragments/Multiples (1994), her first solo exhibition at Mumbai's Chemould Prescott Road, which memorialized the Babri Masjid, and "traced the ripple effects set off by its destruction across other sectors of human interaction than the politics of the Stale." In Dissected Projection (c.1993), six broken fragments from a terracotta pot, meant to represent the "shards" from the Babri Masjid, were placed on a mirror-topped rectangular box. Looming over the box was a "black, bisected pot" that "protrudes like a pregnant belly from the wall." A beam of light projected on this wall showed the "distorted shadows of the two domes, halved and shattered," serving as "ephemeral yet material reminders of the violent anti-Muslim pogroms, in particular, the riots in Bombay (December 1992–January 1993)." A transparent box sat at the foot of the installation, containing loose rubble to represent "the whole being splintered and abstracted," forcing the viewer to reckon with the destruction of Babri Masjid, and the subsequent "disintegration of the collective imagination of India." Many of her canvas- and paper-based pieces from the exhibition also incorporated the recurrent motif of the Masjid's dome. In Behind a Thin Film (1993), Hussain used indigo and earth pigment, as well as layered Xerox prints, to juxtapose the Tower of Babel with the "Hindu mob standing atop the Babri Masjid."

Hussain's other installations for the exhibition, including Conflux, Resonance, and Fragment from Splitting (all c.1993), also used everyday materials, such as broken terracotta pots, wood, mirrors, gheru (a red-ochre clay pigment), and neel (an indigo pigment used as a clothes-whitener), as recurring motifs of oppression. The "sombre palette" of "earth-red, cobalt blue, and indigo coalesce", according to Bharati Chaturvedi of The Indian Express, further "drives home the understanding between the woman and nature as a feminine force, as well as the politics of housekeeping." In an installation featuring indigo-pigmented fabric-pieces hung on a clothesline, Hussain drew a parallel between the manifestations of oppression in the colonial past (British exploitation of Indian indigo-growers) and the "free" present (unpaid housework being traditionally performed by women and girls) to showcase that "labour is always physical and violence first hurts the most vulnerable."

The iconography of the vagina occupies a specific centrality in Hussain's exhibited work; she uses it repeatedly, "as fissure, as source, as wound." In Tunnel Echoes (1994), she groups together five different versions of the vaginal form: "a pencil drawing; an ink drawing on paper, an etching; the zinc plate from which the etching was pulled; and a gypsum board bearing the solid image." Love over Reason and Yoni (both c.1993) combine "evocations of the female body" with "visions of scarred landscapes," using charcoal, neel, terracotta, and gherua on paper, to mirror "the violent intrusion of history into the realm of the personal, the intimate, and the sexual."

"Many of the smaller works, physically ravaged on paper and moved out of their framed paintings-on-wall format by the precariously poised, mirrored, illuminated and now mobile sculptures seemed to indicate that, for Rummana, the female body was fundamentally implicated in the communal violence of the past year, that she was personally physically incapacitated by this condition, and that her desire for movement for maneuverability is to be addressed graphically. As an atheist and a liberal, she felt she had been physically attacked earlier by the parliamentary verdict on Shah Bano; and then, with the destruction of the Masjid, she was individuated but solely as a target: an amalgam of invented religious and class identities flavoured by a neo-liberal patriarchy. The graphic foregrounding of the female body mapped onto the metaphors of the terracotta dome: a new grid for what is no longer a game, a new and hopefully open-ended frontier for re-integration."

— Ashish Rajadhyaksha in the original exhibition catalogue for Fragments/Multiples 1994

Besides Chemould, Fragments/Multiples was also showcased at the Jehangir Art Gallery, Mumbai and later travelled to the Little Theatre Group (LTG) Gallery, New Delhi. Altaf praised the "conceptual and symbolic elements" of the exhibition, which, according to her, "borrowed from feminist concerns regarding the language that a work of art produces." Writing for The Times of India, Indian poet and art critic Ranjit Hoskote said the exhibition "represents the response of a woman artist who found herself, on grounds of religion, suddenly exposed to an irrational assault engineered by cold ideological machinations." He commended Hussain for articulating "the connections between oppression premised on ethnicity and oppression premised on gender" through her installations.

=== Late 1990s: Performance art and continued success ===
==== Living on the Margins (1995) ====
In 1995, Altaf and her daughter Sasha, as well as Nancy Adajania, Shireen Gandhy, and Shakuntala Kulkarni amongst others, were invited to participate in Living on the Margins (1995), Hussain's inaugural performance art piece, at the National Centre for Performing Arts (NCPA), Mumbai. On the day of the performance, she slowly walked around the open courtyard with her feet adorned with ghungroos, her outstretched hands holding a halved papaya, and her mouth wide open "in a soundless primeval scream." After thirty minutes, exhausted from having subjected herself to "various forms of physical stress," she invited the audience to splatter gheru and indigo powder onto the floor as a participatory gesture. Jyoti Dhar writing for the Art Asia Pacific journal said that Hussain "seemed perfectly in her element" during the performance and "at ease with the form of her work." Some audience members later admitted to having never witnessed "anything like this in India," as they watched the artist with a "mixture of rapture and bewilderment," unable to ascertain what she will do next. Sasha Altaf, describing the impact of this "experimental, ephemeral work" on Hussain's cultural peers, noted that the performance "explored the public and the private, the self and the other," as Hussain questioned her identity as well as "discovered the feminine." She said: "Hussain boldly put her body at the center of this piece, which touched upon wider social issues, such as the rise of women participating in and being victims of violence, as well as on specific private issues, such as Hussain's recent discovery that one of her domestic staff had ovarian cancer and another had contracted AIDS. The latter could no longer close her mouth due to the high level of infection-driven ulceration, is believed to have directly influenced Hussain's performance."

==== Home/Nation (1996) ====
In 1996, Hussain was awarded the Senior Fellowship in Visual Arts by Ministry of Human Resource Development, India. She continued to advocate for labor rights, environmental issues and riot relief. She was one of the first artists to voice support for M.F. Hussain in 1996, and protest against his persecution. After his paintings, created in the 1970s, were printed in Vichar Mimansa, a monthly Hindi magazine, as part of an article entitled "M.F. Husain: A Painter or Butcher," eight criminal complaints were filed against him for allegedly hurting the religious sentiments of Hindus. Soon after, Hussain (Rummana) travelled to Ayodhya with photographer Ram Rahman to document the "residues of violence and the architectural remains" of the Babri Masjid. In her next exhibition Home/Nation (1996) at Chemould, she combined "various features and media in an assemblage of semitheatrical elements" to explore the "overlaps of femininity and community, and domestic and public spaces, and to the kindred repetitiveness of Sufi chants and kitchen chores." The seminal installation, creating a partially immersive environment, conflated the two terms–home and nation–to "indicate the growing contradiction buried in the promise of belonging." In one corner of the room stood a pile of boxes labelled "Bind," "Bangles," "Peel" and "Ayodhya," while a video of Living on the Margins (1995) played. Architectural imagery mounted on wooden panels was placed beside rows of monochrome images depicting "hands cutting vegetables, rolling chapatis and scrubbing vessels." Another wall featured "images of open mouths and whitened, halved papayas" interspersed with "arched doorways from Mughal monuments." The installation also displayed several "unusual found objects, including menstrual pads, bangles and news clippings, hung in plastic folders." In the comprehensive 2013 exhibition catalog The Sahmat Collective: Art and Activism in India Since 1989, Indian artist Vivan Sundaram wrote: "[Hussain] used a range of materials in a very fluid manner and was able to integrate the emotional, personal register into the social and historical, and 'Home/Nation' is about that." According to Art Asia Pacific's Jyoti Dhar, Hussain stood out not only for her "exploration of conceptual art," but her "use of objects evocative of the intimate, the domestic and the feminine." Dhar said that in retrospect, Home/Nation is an "almost hesitant collection of components in comparison with the installation that was to follow."

==== The Tomb of Begum Hazrat Mahal (1997) ====
In 1997, as part of group exhibition "Telling Tales" at the British Council in Bath, United Kingdom, Hussain mounted The Tomb of Begum Hazrat Mahal, a multi-media installation featuring a "floor piece and four wall-pieces, one of which was a collection of traditional Hindu and Muslim funerary objects, including aromatic bundles of incense and strings of dried roses (scent serving both to mask the smell of putrefaction, and to stimulate memory)." The installation "wonderfully and effortlessly evokes the principles of gestalt psychology" to resurrect the regent of Awadh (1857–1858), a Joan of Arc-type figure, who participated in the Indian Rebellion of 1857-58 against the East India Company after her husband Nawab of Awadh Wajid Ali Shah was 'defeated' and exiled by the British to Kolkata. She briefly regained control of Lucknow during the period of resistance, before the British captured both Lucknow and Awadh, forcing her to retreat and seek asylum in Nepal. The backdrop of Hussain's eponymous installation is set against the Urdu narration of the life of the "forgotten" Indian revolutionary, detailing "the estrangement from her husband, her defense of the Hindus and Muslims of Lucknow and her eventual flight from her home." A monochrome archival imagery of "palaces, swords and paintings" is juxtaposed with Hussain's performance, where she positions Hazrat Mahal as her fictional ancestor and mirrors the gestures from the frequently-reproduced drawing of the regent. Indian art historian Geeta Kapur said that "with this playful fiction," Hussain aimed to "cross the threshold of the female as potential insurgent into an outright feminist." Commenting on the other elements of the exhibition, Kapur said that Hussain "replaced the feminine in the field of the fetish" to create a room-size mausoleum for the Begum. What appears to be calligraphic text on the walls of the exhibition is revealed to be a "poetic arrangement" of found iron tools and implements," arranged with "extraordinary ingenuity and precision to offer, what would be, a hard won prayer—of the wounded; a prayer that is more real for being inscribed in a mock alphabet." Layers of dark drapes hang from the ceiling on one end of the room, "bound together at the base to form overlapping triangles," with the other end displaying sculptures of "halved, whitened papayas" lying on a "bed of bleached, raw rice." These "fertility metaphors" are accompanied by "tokens, secret wishes, and mannat (prayer)" in the form of taveez (a religious amulet believed to provide protection and grace to the wearer) and other "unclassified votive objects."

During this time, Hussain was an artist-in-residence at Artspace Studios in Bristol, United Kingdom.

==== Is It What You Think? (1998) ====
While visiting New York for her cancer treatment, Hussain connected with art historian Moira Roth and artist Jamelie Hassan; the trio spent their time commiserating about performance art, activism and feminist theory, which would reflect in Hussain's later work. Having explored the "implications of being a Muslim woman," she "fearlessly toyed with existing notions of sexual representation, exposing and mocking these ideas as constructed fantasies." In her performance Is It What You Think? (1998), deemed "provocative yet frightened, voyeuristic yet secretive," Hussain "brought into focus her positions on gender, religion, revolution and death by purposely blurring them." She sat on a chair wearing black lace undergarments, and a parandhi (a long, artificial plait), revealing her mastectomy scars and her prosthesis beneath a black chador. Projected across her torso are images of Iranian hijabi women wielding guns, as Hussain slowly reads the text of Is It What You Think? from a cloth-covered book meant to emulate the Holy Quran. Writing for Art India in 1999, Kapur said: "Perhaps I hang too much on Rummana Hussain's frail body, but she risks herself in a way that." She considers Hussain's "exhibitionist" performance to be an "ironical rendering of a questionnaire" posed to a Muslim woman who is often "the object of religious injunctions […] of urban ethnography." According to Kapur, Hussain, through her performance, "decided, at considerable cost to her hitherto comfortable status, to read history through elective affinities, and to join her lament to the lament of her covered sisters who may, indeed, exceed their 'freer' counterparts in living out the contradictions of present-day liberal society, and achieving in the process a tendentious claim on what Veena Das calls 'the truth of the victim'."

"Where does she belong? Is she behind a veil? Have you defined her? Does she go into her shell? Have you pushed her? What does the press say? Do social conditions alter her behavior? Does she wash herself? Is it a prerequisite? Where does she wash? Does she have breasts? Or has she had a mastectomy? Does she have kinky sex? Does she cover her body and wear transparent clothes? Have you defined her? Has she fought battles? Have they been forgotten? Has she joined a revolution? Which movement has she joined? Has she fought for her rights? How do you interpret that? Do you think that she believes in the jihad? Did you read it in today's newspaper? Is this a love song? Did she fight the colonisers? Did she die for it? Or does she sit behind her veil? Is she educated? Or did you deprive her of that description? Did her father permit her? Does she live behind closed doors? Does she clean, sweep and cook for her family? Does that sound familiar? Is she like you? Can you imagine that? Have you slotted her? Is she the other? Does she follow the preachers? Have you defined her? Does she have any options? Are her beliefs an escape? Or a security? Or a habit? Or a choice? Do you find her mysterious? Do you want to focus on her? Do you want to crack the secret? Could she be you? Do sounds have any association? Do you connect them with her? Does she read the red book? Is she me? Are your associations a fantasy? What language does she speak? Does she listen to you? Has she heard your descriptions of her? Has it made her insecure? Is she you? Would you accept that? Have you forced her into a corner? Is that why she opposes you? Or has she retreated into her shell? Have you defined her, slotted her? Where can she go? Does she resort to her faith? What are her options? Does she chant her prayers? Have you identified her? Has she a lover? Do his fingers touch her body? Does she force them up? Is she ecstatic? Do you believe her? Does she believe you? Does she have soft breasts? Or has she had a mastectomy? Has she been mutilated? Can she bear the pain? Are your words like scissors? Does she carry a knife? Does she chop vegetables? Does she laugh? Does she feel threatened? Is she afraid of ethnic cleansing? Does she threaten you? Does her privacy offend you? Are you confused between resistance and war? Do you think that she has radical views? Do you think she can articulate them? Do you think her voice has been stifled? Is that fact or fiction? Have you defined her? Is she the other? Do you pity her? Is that your construct? Is it a predicament?"

— As recited by Hussain during her performance Is It What You Think? (1998)

In 1998, Hussain was invited to be an artist-in-residence at Art in General in New York City, where she began working on her next performance In Between (1998) created as part of her exhibition entitled "In Order to Join". By this time, her cancer had spread. Rahman, who was also residing in New York, described her as "resilient, attending a Halloween party despite having to be carried up and down the stairs, yet also scared of facing death so soon." In her performance video, Hussain was seen dressed in black, wearing a parandhi and ghungroos, while slowly traversing across the Queensboro Bridge. For the exhibition, the video is accompanied by images that present "poignant glimpses" of an intravenous line attached to her arm at Memorial Sloan Kettering Cancer Center, where she was being treated, as well as Mumbai Central railway station, an Indian vendor at the New York subway station, and the "mundane and repetitive action of vegetables being rapidly chopped in a friend's kitchen in Queens."

Less than a year later, Hussain will succumb to her illness, while as her final work, A Space for Healing (1999), was being installed at the Gallery of Modern Art, Australia for the third Asia Pacific Triennial of Contemporary Art. A Space for Healing was meant to serve as a "resting place for herself and her nation," reflect a "kind of silence and a sense of acceptance" of all that came before, and serve as a "vantage point from which to gaze at what lies beyond." In a red-lit room, Hussain laid out an array of stretchers to resemble prayer mats and create "the symbiotic feeling of both a mosque and a hospital." Surrounding the perimeter are blackened, rusted iron tools disguised in Arab-Persian calligraphy, and gold and vermillion paint. A "deep humming sound" resonated throughout the installation, "possibly tantamount to the eternal sound of the universe." In the artistic statement that accompanies her final work, Hussain "summed up her own role as both an agent and a keeper of collective and individual history": "Each one of us becomes a witness to the constant changing environment, to the spiritual and physically ephemeral nature of the world and to the cycle of life."

In 2019, Rummana’s work was selected for the 58th Venice Biennale’s India Pavilion. Her art was also shown as part of a group exhibition, The Imaginary Institution of India at The Barbican in 2024.

== Symbolism ==
According to art curator and scholar Swapnaa Tamhane, Hussain made a distinctive shift from allegorical and figurative paintings to multi-media works in an urgent response to the politics of the day. Being a secular Muslim from a cosmopolitan family with deep political influence, she suddenly found herself being isolated by a discriminating society. Despite her association with conceptual art, however, Hussain's work remains grounded in the physical using, rather than ignoring, the "sensuousness" of the various materials that make up her installations. Critics often reference this emphasis on materiality in the discussion of the social, specifically feminist, concerns of much of Hussain's oeuvre which acknowledges female corporeality as its starting point. Several of her video and performance-based pieces, for example, center on her own body–a tactic that positions her work at a unique juncture between the political and personal, the public and private. Art historian Geeta Kapur said that Hussain "makes [female and religious identity] matter in a conscious and dialectical way […] she not only pitches her identity for display, she [also] constructs a public space for debate." Her work both establishes an effective relationship with the viewer, and challenges him or her to act.

Around 1993–1994, Hussain began to question her use of materials like paint and canvas, and intentionally gravitated towards "domestic" materials found in the home used by the "unaccounted for, unrepresented labour force of domestic [women] servants," such as washing detergents, chopping knives, cloth, or food. Her performances, Living on the Margins (1995), Textured Terrain (1997), Is it what you think? (1998), and In Between (1998), all contain materials that continue from one performance into the other. Hussain's repetition or imagery and recycling of materials presented in non-hierarchical modes of display became part of a language she used to articulate the process of understanding her own identity and position. She often wore ghungroos, and parandhis, physically embodying a certain sense of movement and the fleeting quality of sound. She often donned a burqa or chador, traditional Islamic garments that she otherwise never wore in her daily life as a "modern, educated, cosmopolitan Muslim," to interrogate their symbolism, presence, signification, shape, and meaning.

== Personal life ==
Hussain was married to Ishaat Hussain, an Indian businessman and former interim chairman of Tata Consultancy Services (TCS). They had a daughter, Shazmeen, who was married to Indian filmmaker Shaad Ali in 2006; the couple divorced in 2011. Hussain has one grandchild from Shazmeen's second marriage to Rustom Lawyer.

In 1995, at the age 43, she was diagnosed with breast cancer, following which she underwent a mastectomy in Mumbai, and flew back-and-forth to the United States to receive further treatment. Hussain was 47 at the time of her death on 5 July 1999.
