= L.N. Tallur =

Indian conceptual artist

- Born: 1971 (age 54–55); Udupi, Karnataka, India
- Education: Chamarajendra Academy of Visual Arts, Maharaja Sayajirao University, Leeds Metropolitan University
- Known for: Conceptual art
- Awards: The Skoda Prize
- Website: tallur.com

Laxmi Narayan Tallur (/təˈlʊər/ TUH-LOOR, Kannada: [ತಲ್ಲೂರು]; born 1971), professionally known as L.N. Tallur, is an Indian conceptual artist best known for sculptural, site-specific art installations and interactive media. He is represented by Chemould Prescott Road in Mumbai, Nature Morte in New Delhi and Arario Gallery in Seoul.

== Early life and education ==
Tallur was born in Koteshwara, a coastal town located in the Kundapur taluk of Karnataka's Udupi district. His father worked with the Sales Tax Department and traveled often.

After completing a BFA in painting from Chamarajendra Academy of Visual Arts, Mysuru in 1996, he received the Karnataka Lalit Kala Akademi Scholarship to pursue an MFA in museology from the from Maharaja Sayajirao University, Baroda. During this time, he was also awarded the National Scholarship by Ministry of Human Resource Development (MHRD), Government of India. In 2001-02, Tallur received the Commonwealth Scholarship to study Contemporary Fine Art Practice at Leeds Metropolitan University, United Kingdom.

== Career ==
Tallur's early work, such as Unicode (2011), Obituary (2013) and Milled History (2014), is characterised by a recurring theme of value—monetary or otherwise—as a historical gauge of intersocietal and interpersonal relationships. Unicode features a Chola-era bronze of Nataraja obscured by a concrete lump embedded with coins. The sculpture, named after the universal coding protocol used across all computing devices, is a commentary on "the homogenising potential of globalisation and the elevation of money to the status of God."

In Obituary, we see a palanquin bearing a wooden log, into which a number of coins have been hammered. The viewers can add more coins to increase the value of the sculpture. However, with incense smoke engulfing the palanquin, the sculpture is reminiscent of both an altar and a funeral pyre, gently reminding us of the transient nature of wealth. To create Milled History, Tallur digitally scanned a wooden copy of a termite-ravaged temple figurine and then milled a replica from teakwood sandstone. The sculpture embodies conventional markers of age, making pointed references to the value we usually attribute to such signs of wear and tear.

== Exhibitions ==
=== Selected solo exhibitions ===
- Neti-Neti;Glitch in the Code Nature Morte, New Delhi, India (2024)
- Data Mining Chhatrapati Shivaji Maharaj Vastu Sangrahalaya, Mumbai, India (2024)
- Vidi Vini Vici Linden Museum, Stuttgart, Germany (2023)
- V+Mana Kempegowda International Airport, Bengaluru, India (2023)
- Chirag-e-AI Museum of Art & Photography (MAP), Bengaluru, India (2022)
- Interference Fringe Grounds For Sculpture, New Jersey, United States of America (2019)
- Coinage UPM Circle, Manipal, India (2018)
- Smoke Out Chemould Prescott Road, Mumbai, India (2017)
- The Threshold Arario Gallery, Seoul, South Korea (2015)
- UKAI (Cormorant Fish Hunting) Nature Morte, New Delhi (2014)
- Balancing Act SCAD Museum of Art, Georgia, United States of America (2013)
- New Yorked Jack Shainman Gallery, New York, United States of America (2013)
- Montessori: Lessons in Economics Nature Morte, Berlin, Germany (2012)
- Password Nature Morte, New Delhi, India (2012)
- Quintessential Dr. Bhau Daji Lad Museum, Mumbai, India (2011)
- Chromatophobia—The Fear of Money (Part 2) Nature Morte, New Delhi (2011)
- Chromatophobia—The Fear of Money (Part 1) Arario Gallery, South Korea (2011)
- Chromatophobia—The Fear of Money (Part 1) Arario Gallery, Beijing, China (2011)
- PLACEBO Chemould Prescott Road, Mumbai, India (2009)
- Antimatter Arario New York, New York, United States of America (2008)
- Bon Appetite Arario Seoul, Korea (2007)
- Past Modern, Interactive Art Objects Bose Pacia Modern, New York, United States of America (2000)
- Past Modern Interactive Art Objects Gallery Chemould, Mumbai, India (1999)

=== Selected group exhibitions ===
==== 2024 ====
- Move Sound Image Ground Seoul, South Korea
- Money Talks: Art, Society & Power Ashmolean Museum, Oxford, United Kingdom
- My World Singer Laren Museum, Laren, Netherlands

==== 2023 ====
- Find X Frida Art House, Pune, India
- Things are Vanishing before us Gallery Dotwalk, Bikaner House, Delhi, India
- Part 2 - Futuring | CheMoulding: Framing Future Archives Chemould Prescott Road, Mumbai, India
- Multiple Realities - Voices in Contemporary Indian Ceramics Clayarch Gimhae Museum, South Korea
- A Demonstration of Ornamentation Nature Morte, New Delhi, India
- Pop South Asia: Artistic Explorations in the Popular Kiran Nadar Museum of Art, Delhi, India

==== 2022 ====
- Kiaf Seoul Arario Gallery, Seoul, South Korea
- Frieze-Seoul Arario Gallery, Seoul, South Korea and Nature Morte, New Delhi, India
- Pop South Asia: Artistic Explorations in the Popular Sharjah Art Foundation, Sharjah, United Arab Emirates
- Earth Chronicles 1X1 Art Gallery, Dubai, United Arab Emirates
- Modus Operandi III: Together Alone Chemould Prescott Road Mumbai, India
- Manicured Techniques Nature Morte, New Delhi, India

==== 2021 ====
- Reimagining the Object Chemold Prescott Road, Mumbai, India
- On | Site Bikaner House, New Delhi with Chemould Prescott Road, Mumbai, India and Nature Morte, New Delhi, India
- Markers of Time & Space Nature Morte, New Delhi, India

==== 2020 ====
- The Idea of the Acrobat Bikaner House, New Delhi, India
- Erasure Birla Academy of Art & Culture, Kolkata, India
- Game of Chance Center for Arts, Goa, India
- Out-site / Insight Chemould Prescott Road, Mumbai, India

==== 2018 ====
- Modus Operandi Chemould Prescott road, Mumbai, India

==== 2017 ====
- India and the World: History in Nine Stories, Chhatrapati Shivaji Maharaj Vastu Sangrahalaya, Mumbai and National Museum, New Delhi, India
- Contemporary Art Acquisitions Dr. Bhau Daji Lad Museum, Mumbai, India
- Sub-Plots: Laughing in the Vernacular National Gallery of Modern Art, Mumbai, India
- Art in Counting House 21C Durham Museum Hotel, United States of America
- Persevering Traditions Sakshi Gallery, Mumbai, India and Art DistrictXIII, New Delhi, India

==== 2016 ====
- The Dream Must Turn Speculative Nature Morte, Mumbai, India

==== 2015 ====
- Constructs / Constructions Kiran Nadar Museum of Art, New Delhi, India
- After Midnight: Indian Moderns and Contemporary Indian Art Queens Museum, New York, United States of America
- Encounters Art Basel, Hong Kong, China

==== 2014 ====
- Mise En Scène, The School, Kinderhook, New York, United States of America
- Beyond the Classical: Imagining the Ideal Across Time The National Academy Museum, New York, United States of America
- By Destiny Arario Museum, Jeju island, South Korea
- Universal Studios, Seoul: An Exhibition of Works by Foreign Artists Seoul Art Museum, South Korea
- The Armory Show, representing Jack Shainman Gallery, New York, United States of America
- India Art Fair, representing Nature Morte Gallery New Delhi, India

== Awards ==
- D Devaraj Urs Award, Chitrakala Samman Awards, Chitrakala Parishat, Bengaluru, India (2024)
- The SKODA Prize Delhi, India (2012)
- Sanskriti Award, Sanskriti Foundation, Delhi, India (2003)
- Emerging Artist Award, Bose Pacia Modern, New York, United States of America (1999)
- Inlaks Fine Art Award, Inlaks Foundation, Delhi, India (1997)

== Personal life ==
Tallur splits his time between his family home in Karnataka, India and Daegu, South Korea, where his wife is from.

== See also ==
- Tallur
