= Anusha Yadav =

Indian photographer

Anusha Yadav (born 1975) is an Indian photographer, acclaimed editorial designer, and the founder of the pioneering online archive Indian Memory Project. Her interdisciplinary work spans photography, design, paper arts and historical archiving, and is widely recognized for its originality, cultural depth, and narrative power.

== Photography ==
Yadav is noted for her photographic series Portrait of a city (2010), where she documented different nationalities residing in one city of Salzburg (Austria), Home: An irrevocable condition (2013), Transfixed (2020) and in particular - Impersonations (2017), in which she reimagines herself as iconic women from history and popular culture, including Bettie Page, Mata Hari, and Mehr-un-Nissa. The series has garnered critical attention for its exploration of identity, femininity, and performative memory.

== Indian Memory Project ==
In 2010, she founded Indian Memory Project — the world's first narrative-based online archive that uses personal photographs and family histories to trace the sociocultural fabric of South Asia and the Indian subcontinent. The project has been globally recognized for redefining the role of public memory and personal history in historical discourse.

== The Photograph is Proof ==
The Photograph is Proof is a research-based archival photography project by Yadav that examines how photography has been used as evidence in India's criminal and political history. Drawing from rarely seen forensic archives, police records, and media imagery, the project questions the authority and narrative power of the photographic image.

Sparked by her discovery of Indian Art Studio—Mumbai's oldest police photography studio—Yadav explored landmark cases like the Alipore Bomb Case (1908), the Nanavati-Ahuja murder trial (1959), and the Amherst Street murder (1868), highlighting photography's role or absence in shaping public perception and state control.

The series was exhibited at the Format International Photography Festival (UK, 2015) and Chemould Prescott Road (Mumbai, 2017), and has been praised for its critical inquiry into the intersection of memory, myth, and visual evidence.

== Editorial Design ==
As an award-winning book designer, she has crafted high-profile publications for institutions such as the United Nations Development Programme (UNDP), Apeejay Surrendra Group, and Welspun World. She has also designed landmark monographs for contemporary Indian artists including Vivan Sundaram, Anant Joshi, and Mithu Sen, as well as galleries such as Chemould Prescott Road.

== Collections ==
Her works are included in several private collections and the collection of the Museum of Fine Arts, Houston.
