= Chemould Prescott Road =

Coordinates: 18.9359°N 72.8323°E

- Former name: Gallery Chemould
- Location: 3rd Floor, Queen's Mansion, Prescott Road, Fort, Mumbai
- Type: Contemporary Art Gallery
- Founders: Kekoo & Khorshed Gandhy
- Website: www.gallerychemould.com

Chemould Prescott Road (originally Gallery Chemould), is the first contemporary art gallery in Mumbai, India.

== Gallery ==
Chemould Prescott Road was founded by Kekoo Gandhy and Khorshed Gandhy in 1963. Based in Mumbai (Bombay), in 2007 the gallery moved from the first floor of the Jehangir Art Gallery to Prescott Road.

== Artists ==
Chemould has been instrumental in establishing the reputations of many now well-known Indian modern artists. MF Husain, Tyeb Mehta, and SH Raza, who emerged on the first wave of India's modernist and contemporary art movements, first exhibited with Chemould. Under the directorship of their daughter Shireen Gandhy since 1988, Chemould Prescott Road has expanded its roster of artists to represent those working in experimental work, and its exhibition program spans younger, mid-career, and senior artists. Chemould also hosted the first solo exhibition of the late Bhupen Khakhar, Ram Kumar, Nalini Malani, Atul Dodiya, Anju Dodiya, Jitish Kallat, Reena Saini Kallat, KH Ara, Bal Chhabda, Krishen Khanna, Jehangir Sabavala, Gaitonde, KK Hebbar, Vivan Sundaram, and Jivya Soma Mashe all exhibited with Chemould. Targeting the young collector and the millennial, Shireen Gandhy conceptualized Modus Operandi in 2018.

Their current roster has 30 artists which also include artists like Aditi Singh, Anant Joshi, Anju Dodiya, Atul Dodiya, Archana Hande, Bhuvanesh Gowda, Bijoy Jain, Desmond Lazaro, Dhruvi Acharya, Gigi Scaria, Jitish Kallat, Lavanya Mani, Madhavi Subrahmanian, Meera Devidayal, Mehlli Gobhai, Mithu Sen, N S Harsha, Nilima Sheikh, Pushpamala N, Rashid Rana, Reena Kallat, Ritesh Meshram, Sheetal Gattani, Shakuntala Kulkarni, Shilpa Gupta, Tallur L N, Tanuja Rane, Varunika Saraf, Vivan Sundaram, and Yardena Kurulkar.

== Kekee Manzil: The House of Art ==
A film on the life of its founders Kekoo Gandhy and his wife Khorshed Gandhy, Kekee Manzil: The House of Art, was made by Behroze Gandhy, their second daughter. Kekee Manzil is the name of a villa/bungalow/mansion, built in 1921, and named after Kekoo Gandhy, by his father, at the end of Bandra's Bandstand Promenade, right next to Shah Rukh Khan's Mannat bungalow.

== Citizen Gallery: The Gandhys of Chemould and the birth of modern art in Bombay ==
This book documenting details about the Gallery Chemould and the extraordinary Gandhy family traces the history of modern art in India. Written by author Jerry Pinto, the book was released in December 2022.

== Chemould CoLab ==
The gallery has an extension in Colaba, Mumbai. It's been conceptualised by Kekoo & Khorshed's granddaughter Atyaan Jungalwala, along with Sunaina Rajan and is extension program that supports new artists
