= Shaad Ali =

Indian film director and screenwriter

Shaad Ali Sehgal
- Born: 14 March 1975 (age 51); Kanpur, Uttar Pradesh, India
- Spouses: Shazmeen Hussain (m. 2006; div. 2011) Aarti Patkar (m. 2013)
- Children: Imaan Shaad
- Parents: Muzaffar Ali (father); Subhashini Ali (mother)
- Family: Swaminathan Ali Family and Sehgal Family

Shaad Ali is an Indian film director and screenwriter who works in Hindi films.

== Early life and education ==
Ali was born to Muzaffar Ali and Subhashini Ali (née Sahgal), an Indian politician and member of the Communist Party of India (Marxist). He is thus the grandson of Azad Hind Fauj commander Lakshmi Sahgal and Colonel Prem Sahgal. He studied at the Welham Boys' School and the Lawrence School, Sanawar.

His paternal grandfather, Raja Syed Sajid Husain Ali, was the former ruling prince of the principality of Kotwara in Awadh of pre-independence India. Ali is the nephew of environmental educator Kartikeya Sarabhai and the Indian classical dancer Mallika Sarabhai.

== Career ==
Shaad Ali started his career as an assistant director to Mani Ratnam, and assisted him on the film Dil Se.. (1998).

He made his directorial debut under Yash Raj Films and Madras Talkies, with Saathiya (2002), starring Vivek Oberoi and Rani Mukerji. The film was a remake of Mani Ratnam's Tamil film Alai Payuthey (2000). Saathiya's script was written by Ratnam. The film did well and established Ali in the industry.

His second film was Bunty Aur Babli (2005) which for the first time brought together real-life father and son Amitabh Bachchan and Abhishek Bachchan alongside Rani Mukerji. The film was one of the biggest hits of the year.

Ali's third film, released on 15 June 2007 and titled Jhoom Barabar Jhoom, stars Abhishek Bachchan, Preity Zinta, Bobby Deol and Lara Dutta in lead roles.

His fourth directorial venture was Kill Dil which was released on 14 November 2014. The movie received average reviews from critics and lukewarm response at the Box office.

He then directed the movie Ok Jaanu which released on 13 January 2017. It is a remake of Mani Ratnam's Tamil movie O Kadhal Kanmani. This film reunited him with composer A. R. Rahman after Saathiya (2002), after Rahman turned down Bunty Aur Babli citing a busy schedule.

His next movie was Soorma, a biographical sports drama film based on the life of hockey player Sandeep Singh, releasied on 13 July 2018.

== Personal life ==
Ali married Shazmeen Hussain, daughter of conceptual artist Rummana Hussain and businessman Ishaat Hussain, in 2006. The couple divorced in 2011 [9][10]. He briefly dated Pooja Shetty, daughter of Adlabs founder Manmohan Shetty. In 2013, he married stylist Aarti Patkar. On 31 December 2013, he had a son named Imaan Shaad.

== Filmography ==
Year	Title	Director	Assistant Director
1998	Dil Se..		Yes
2002	Saathiya	Yes	
2005	Bunty Aur Babli	Yes	
2007	Jhoom Barabar Jhoom	Yes	
2007	Guru		Yes
2010	Raavan		Yes
2010	Raavanan		Yes
2014	Kill Dil	Yes	
2017	Ok Jaanu	Yes	
2018	Soorma	Yes	
2022	Mister Mummy	Yes	

=== Web series ===
- Pawan & Pooja (2020)
- Call My Agent: Bollywood (2021)
- Bloody Brothers (2022)
