= Varunika Saraf =

Indian contemporary painter

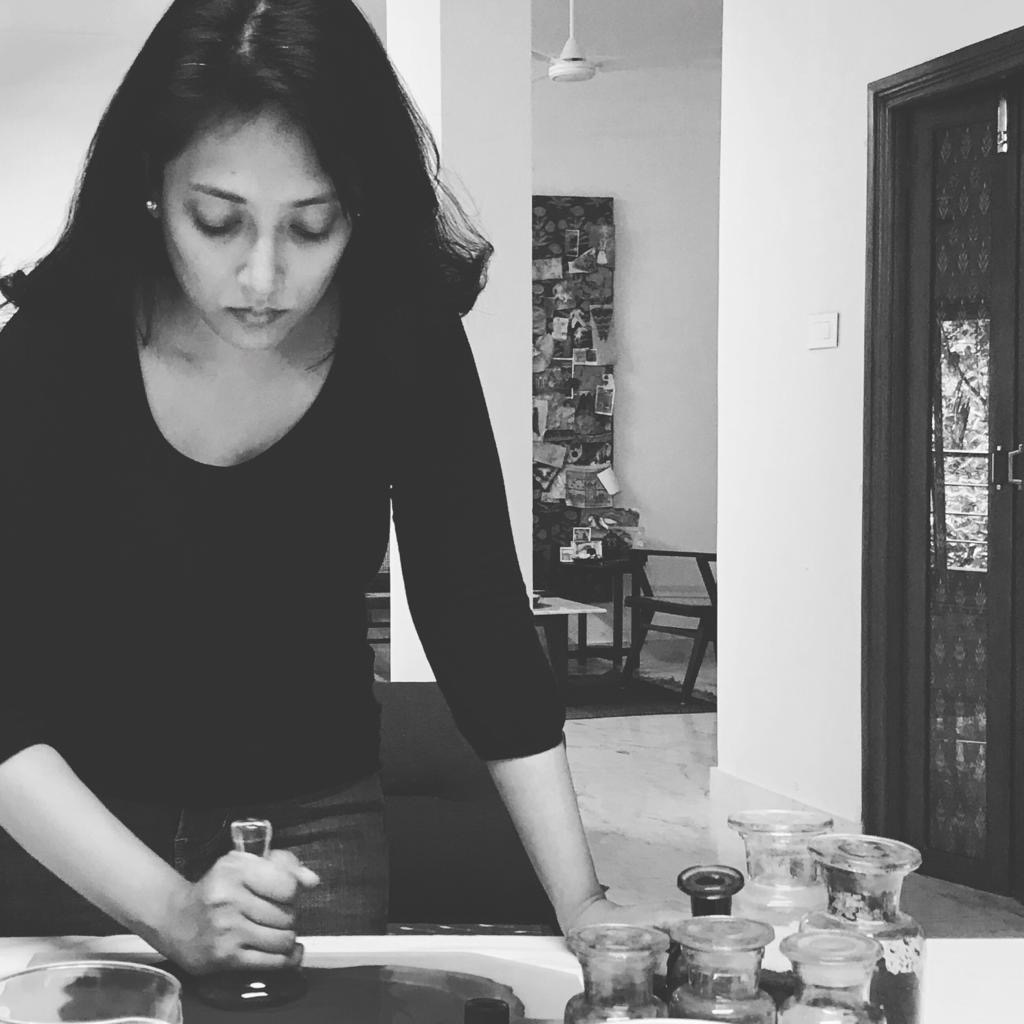
- Varunika Saraf in her studio
- Born: 1981 (age 44–45); Nagpur, Maharashtra, India
- Education: Jawaharlal Nehru Architecture and Fine Arts University
- Known for: Painting Embroidery Miniature Art
- Notable work: We, the People: Tracing the country’s history through embroidery
- Website: varunikasaraf.com

Varunika Saraf (born 19 December 1981, in Nagpur, Maharashtra) and now based in Hyderabad is an Indian contemporary painter who seeks to bare the reality of violence often drawing attention historical and political realities and injustices in India.

== Art practice ==
Saraf's main material is Wasli, an ancient Indian paper for detailed painting and hand-ground pigments made in her studio. The artist employs color as a form of abstraction to attract viewers to the complex details within often massive scale paintings. She also uses miniature art, embroidery,

== Exhibitions ==
Saraf is represented by Chemould Prescott Road, Mumbai where she had a solo exhibition in 2021. Her work has been presented at Art Basel (Basel and Hong Kong), Art Dubai and India Art Fair. She has been a part of several solo and group exhibitions in India and abroad.

== Public collections ==
Varunika Saraf's works are a part of the collections at KNMA, New Delhi; Chemould Prescott Road, Mumbai; Kasturbhai Lalbhai Museum and Sarmaya Foundation.

== Awards and Honors ==
Saraf received an Mention from the Sharjah Biennial Prize jury for her series ‘We, The People’ which was a part of the Sharjah Biennale 15 Thinking Historically in the Present. She was also awarded the Asia Society Gamechanger Award (Asia Arts Future Award), 2023, Kashi Award for Visual Arts (KAVA2), 2006 and Shri. SL Parasher Gold Medal, University of Hyderabad, 2006.
