= List of archives in India =

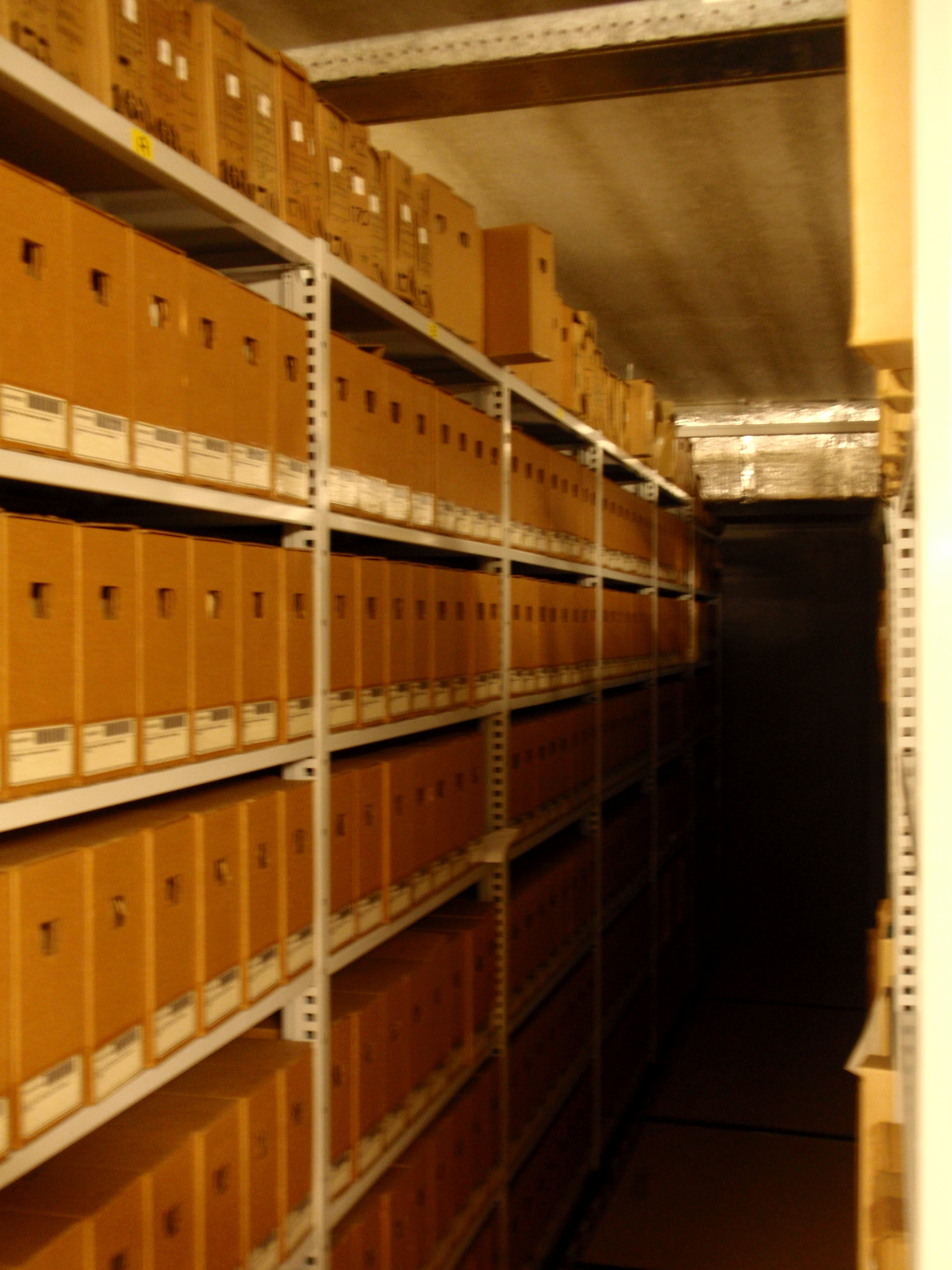
Archives

This is a list of archives which were held in India, which collect and store historical documents, photographs, shashtras and all the other media.

== National archives ==
- National Archives of India - established in Kolkata as the "Imperial Record Department" in 1891.
- National Film Archive of India
- National Mission for Manuscripts - established in New Delhi in 2003.

== State archives ==
- Assam State Archives
- Uttar Pradesh State Archives- established at Lucknow in 1975.
- Bihar state archives - established in Patna in 1912 as the Civil secretariat record room.
- Delhi archives - established in New Delhi in 1972.
- Goa state archives - established in Panaji on 25 February 1595 by Diogo do Couto and was called "Torre do Tombo do Estado da India". The oldest record is from the year 1498.
- Haryana state archives
- Himachal Pradesh state archives - established in 1979.
- Karnataka state archives - established in Bangalore in 1972.
- Kerala state archives - established in Thiruvanandapuram in 1962.
- Madhya Pradesh state archives - "The new State of Madhya Pradesh came into existence on 1st November 1956. It was carved out of the parts of old Madhya Pradesh (Central Provinces & Berar) the erstwhile States of Gwalior, Indore, Bhopal, Rewa and Madhya Bharat State."
- Maharashtra state archives - in Mumbai, Pune, Kolhapur and Vidarbha.
- Manipur state archives - established in Imphal in 1982
- Mizoram state archives - established in Aizawl in 1979.
- Nagaland state archives - established Kohima in 2012.
- Odisha state archives
- Punjab state archives - known as the Punjab State Archives, Patiala
- Rajasthan state archives - is established in Bikaner.
- Tamil Nadu Archives previously known as Madras Record Office - established in 1909 at Madras.
- West Bengal state archives
- Sikkim state archives

== Other archives ==
- Archives of Indian Labour - established in Noida in 1998.
- Bhandarkar Oriental Research Institute
- Gandhi Research Foundation, Gandhi Teerth, Jalgaon
- Indian Memory Project, Mumbai - established in 2010
- St Kuriakose Elias Chavara Archives and Research Centre Mannanam - established in Mannanam, Kottayam, Kerala as the "Church and Historical Archives"
- Cooch Behar Archive - established in 2013 at Cooch Behar District, West Bengal
- Sarmaya Arts Foundation
- Kalakriti Archives

== See also ==
- List of museums in India
- Open access in India
