= Shakuntala Kulkarni =

Indian contemporary artist

- Born: Karnataka
- Education: Sir JJ School of Art
- Known for: Sculpture, Painting Video Performance Art
- Notable work: 'Of Bodies, Armor, and Cages', 2012
- Website: www.shakuntalakulkarni.com

Shakuntala Kulkarni (born in Karnataka, 1950) is an Indian contemporary artist whose work highlights the plight of urban women and their spaces.

== Career ==
Trained at Sir JJ School of Art, MSU Baroda & SantiNiketan, Shakuntala Kulkarni explores sculpture, performance, new media and textiles. Working across mediums like glass, acrylic, cane and using video and photography to create installations, her most well known body of work is '‘Of Bodies, Armor, and Cages' created in 2012. This work has also been created as limited edition headgear for raising funds.

Her recent solo exhibition, 'Quieter than Silence' was shown at Chemould Prescott Road in 2023.

== Exhibitions ==
Her work has been shown at the Indian Pavilion at Venice Biennale, Art Unlimited at Art Basel, Dhaka Art Summit, Art Dubai, NGV Triennial and India Art Fair. She has been a part of several other solo and group exhibitions in India and abroad.

== Collaborations ==
Her recent collaboration with Dior for their recent ATW collection featured installations from her notable work -'Of Bodies, Armour and Cages'

== Public collections ==
Shakuntala Kulkarni's works are a part of the collections at KNMA, New Delhi; Jehangir Nicholson Art Foundation in Mumbai, Chemould Prescott Road, Mumbai and Sarmaya Foundation, Mumbai

== Books ==
Her art work is a part of the Art for Baby book
