= Tamil Nadu Archives and Historical Research =

- Location within Chennai

General information
- Type: Government Buildings
- Architectural style: Indo-Saracenic
- Location: No. 51, Gandhi Irwin Road, Egmore, Chennai, Tamil Nadu 600 008, Chennai, India
- Coordinates: 13.0764°N 80.2604°E
- Current tenants: Department of Archives & Historical Research
- Completed: 1909
- Cost: ₹2.25 lakh
- Owner: Government of Tamil Nadu

Design and construction
- Main contractor: P. Loganatha Mudaliar

Website
- tamilnaduarchives.tn.gov.in

The Tamil Nadu Archives and Historical Research, formerly known as the Madras Record Office is the official archival facility that holds the government records of the state of Tamil Nadu, India. With its origins dating back to a record keeping facility set up at the council room of Fort St George in 1672, it is one of the oldest and largest document repositories in Southern India. Documents stored and archived in TNA are invaluable to researchers working on post-independence Tamil Nadu or British-era Madras Presidency. In addition to British India records, TNA also houses a substantial collection of Dutch East India Company records from the late-seventeenth and eighteenth centuries and volumes relating to various southern Princely States.

The Tamil Nadu Archives and Historical Research has an up-to-date publication facility for publication of records from time to time. The archives are also tasked with the publication of the official district gazetteers of the state of Tamil Nadu.

== History ==
=== Record keeping in Madras ===
In 1672 William Langhorne the Governor of Madras presidency insisted on keeping records on all government transactions and its preservation for future. These records were initially stored in council room at Fort St. George which is the present day Secretariat-Assembly complex. His successor Streynsham Master also continued this tradition of record keeping. Due to increasing volume of records storage of records were scattered across various departments. It was in 1805 Lord William Bentinck, then Governor of Madras presidency ordered the centralization of all Secretariat records which were scattered in the various Departments of the Secretariat and appointed a Record Keeper and supporting staff to index, look after and to issue records promptly on requisition from various departments for reference. Muthiah, the principal native servant in the Political and Military Department, was appointed Record Keeper.

In 1823 the records were moved into several rooms on the first floor of the Secretariat. Later on, the office was shifted to the "Pillar-godown", and in 1888 it moved to the ground floor of the Secretariat building. Due to the increasing number of records in 1909 the government decided to establish an independent record department.

=== Construction ===
When a new location was being considered for relocating the records office, one of the suggested location was the government bungalow called Grassmere. There was a debate among the officials if Grassmere should be used to house the Medical and Sanitation Department who were also eyeing the same property for its own office. But the sewage farm next door (now the Mayor Radhakrishnan Stadium) had several officials questioning the wisdom of this move. This debate lasted for two years before it was decided that the building was more suited for the archives. P. Loganatha Mudaliar was given the contract to rebuild Grassmere to make it suitable for its new function as the archives. It cost ₹225,000 for the reconstruction of Grassmere to make it suitable for the new Archives building. An additional ₹125,000 was spent on stacks and furniture. This Indo-Saracenic building was built with open spaces for future expansion and constructed to provide maximum protection to the records. The construction was completed and opened for operation in October 1909. The administrative block and six record stacks were constructed in 1909. The seventh stack was added in 1929 and the eighth and ninth were added in 1938. Further additions to the building such as the present Stationery section and Preservation Section were made in 1978 and 1994, respectively. In 1999 a new building for housing the Archival Library was constructed.

=== Curator of records ===
The head of Madras Record Office is designated as curator. Upon its completion C M Schmidt, the Registrar of the Secretariat, was put in temporary charge till Prof Henry Dodwell of Presidency College and Teachers’ College was appointed the first Curator in April 1911.

To improve the administration and research capabilities of the Tamil Nadu Archives, the Madras Government in the year 1930 appointed Percy Macqueen, the Collector of Ramnad, on special duty for two years to examine its Revenue records. Although not an academic, Macqueen's tenure fostered significant growth in historical research at the institution. He notably improved access for scholars by creating essential research aids, such as guides and indexes, while also facilitating better working conditions and guidance for researchers.

== See also ==
- Architecture of Chennai
- Heritage structures in Chennai
- List of archives in India
