= B. V. K. Sastry =

Indian writer

Bangalore Venkatasubbiah Krishna Sastry (30 July 1916 – 22 September 2003) was a linquist, Indian writer and music critic. He was born in Nanjangud in the State of Karnataka on 30 July 1916. He earned a diploma in painting from Chamarajendra Technical Institute in 1938. He died on 22 September 2003.

He worked as a professor of Hindu studies at Hindu University of America in Orlando. He also worked as a linguist at the Yoga-Samskrutham University in Florida.

One of his first writings was Pracheena Chitrakale which was published in Prabuddha Karnataka in 1941.

Among the artists whose work he reviewed was Lata Mangeshkar, one of India’s most renowned playback singers. Such was Shastri’s standing as a critic that his assessments were highly regarded by leading musicians of his time. It is said that Lata Mangeshkar herself valued his opinions and was keen to hear his critiques and observations on her performances, reflecting the respect he commanded among India’s foremost musical artists.

== Awards ==
- Padmashree awarded (Could not receive it due to health issues)

Akashvani Annual Award (1976)

- Karnataka State Rajyotsava Award (1985)
- Karnataka Lalita Kala Academy Award (1986)
- The Music Academy's T.T.K. Award (1986)
- Karnataka Sangeeta Nrutya Academy Award (1988)
- Sangeet Natak Akademi Award Overall contribution (1999–2000)
