= Artes Mundi =

International biennial contemporary art exhibition and prize

Coordinates: 51°28′52″N 3°10′44″W

- Description: Prize for international contemporary visual artists whose work engages with social reality and lived experience
- Country: Wales
- Presented by: Artes Mundi
- Reward: £40,000
- First award: 2003
- Website: www.artesmundi.org

Artes Mundi (Latin: arts of the world) is an international arts organisation based in Cardiff, Wales. Established in 2002, it is committed to supporting international contemporary visual artists whose work engages with social reality and lived experience. The Artes Mundi exhibition and prize takes place biennially, running a sustained programme of outreach and learning projects alongside the public exhibition and prize giving.

== Background ==
Founded in 2002, Artes Mundi was established as an initiative by Welsh artist and cultural entrepreneur William Wilkins with the support of the Welsh Assembly Government, the City of Cardiff, Arts Council Wales and BBC Cymru. Its founding premise was to bring exceptional international art to Wales centred on the Artes Mundi Prize with the associated exhibition taking place in Cardiff every two years. The name of the organisation, Latin for “arts of the world”, was conceived as a reflection of the focus on artists whose work engages with social realities, part of its core mission.

Since 2003, the Artes Mundi art prize has been held every two years at the National Museum Cardiff. Since 2014/15, the prize and exhibition has expanded into other venues The prize is the biggest art prize in the United Kingdom with £40,000 for each year's winner. Though the exhibition takes place in Cardiff, the focus is on international artists.

=== Funding and Partners ===
Artes Mundi is a non-profit registered charity publicly funded as a portfolio organisation of Arts Council Wales and also receives support from Cardiff City Council. The majority of other funds are raised via the Welsh government, trusts, foundations, cultural agencies, sponsorship, donations and individuals.

The Bagri Foundation will be the Presenting Partner for Artes Mundi 10 (2023) and Artes Mundi 11 (2025). This collaboration will be the Foundation's first major partnership within the UK outside of London.

=== Personnel ===
Its founding artistic director and CEO was Tessa Jackson. In 2010, Ben Borthwick was appointed artistic director and CEO, after Jackson left. In 2013, the director became Karen MacKinnon. In 2019, Nigel Prince was announced the new Director.

== Prize winners ==
- 2004 (Artes Mundi 1), Xu Bing (China)
- 2006 (Artes Mundi 2), Eija-Liisa Ahtila (Finland)
- 2008 (Artes Mundi 3), N. S. Harsha (India)
- 2010 (Artes Mundi 4), Yael Bartana (Israel)
- 2012 (Artes Mundi 5), Teresa Margolles (Mexico).
- 2015 (Artes Mundi 6), Theaster Gates (USA), who declared he would share his £40,000 prize with the other nominees.
- 2017 (Artes Mundi 7), John Akomfrah (UK)
- 2019 (Artes Mundi 8), Apichatpong Weerasethakul (Thailand)
- 2021 (Artes Mundi 9), All six shortlisted artists were awarded the Artes Mundi 9 prize, Firelei Báez (Dominican Republic), Dineo Seshee Bopape (South Africa), Meiro Koizumi (Japan), Beatriz Santiago Muñoz (Puerto Rico), Prabhakar Pachpute (India), Carrie Mae Weems (USA), each receiving £10,000.
- 2024 (Artes Mundi 10), Taloi Havini (Papua New Guinea)

== See also ==
- List of European art awards
