= Anju Dodiya =

Indian artist

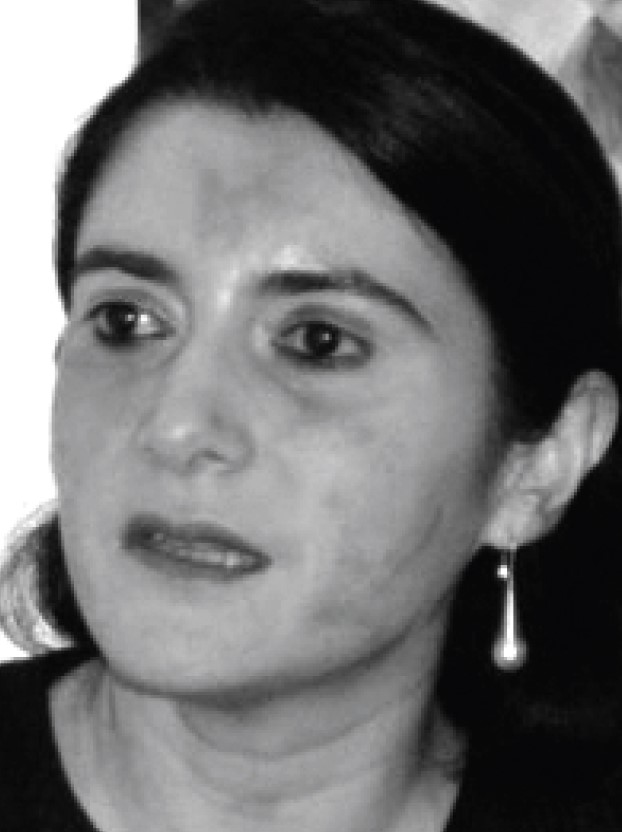
- Born: 7 April 1964 (age 62); Mumbai, Maharashtra
- Education: Sir J. J. School of Art, Mumbai
- Known for: Painting
- Style: Abstract
- Spouse: Atul Dodiya
- Children: Biraaj Dodiya

Anju Dodiya (born 7 April 1964) is an Indian contemporary painter. She lives and works in Mumbai. Her paintings feature autobiographical and human relationships, with 'women' usually at the center.

Her works are frequently a juxtaposition of watercolor and charcoal as a medium.

== Life and education ==
Anju Dodia was born in Mumbai, Maharashtra. She has graduated from Sir J. J. School of Art in 1986 with a BFA in Painting. She is the wife of Atul Dodiya, who is also a notable contemporary Indian painter. Their daughter Biraaj is also an artist.

== Career ==
=== Style ===
In the early days, her art was mostly in the abstract style. However, with a constant interest in the human mind and psychoanalysis, her inclination towards anthropomorphic imagery has continued to feature in her works. Dodiya is influenced by Renaissance painters like Giotto, the films of Ingmar Bergman, Japanese ukiyo-e prints and the poetry of Sylvia Plath. She has also been inspired by medieval devotional poetry, Gujarati folklore and myths from around the world. The combined effect of all these influences is reflected in her unique style of painting.

=== Themes ===
A subtle commentary on contemporary events, sociology, economics and culture have been major themes of her artworks. Newspaper headlines, photographs of fashion models, films are the reference material for her paintings. The details in her paintings show the outward appearance of reality with layered symbolism. She has also used cloth as a medium of painting in different ways.

== Work ==
=== Major exhibitions ===
Dodiya's works have been exhibited in the Frieze international art fair, Art Basel at Basel and Hong Kong, the India Art Fair, and the Delhi Contemporary Art Week in New Delhi. She has been a part of several other solo and group exhibitions in India and abroad.

=== Public collections ===
In India, Dodiya's works are a part of the collections at NGMA, New Delhi; KNMA, New Delhi; Vadhera Art Gallery, New Delhi; Chemould Prescott Road, Mumbai; NGMA, Mumbai and JNAF, Mumbai. Whereas, her creations present abroad are in the Art Institute of Chicago, Chicago and Burger Collection, Hong Kong to name a few.

=== Awards and nominations ===
Dodiya has received the Reliance India Art Exhibition Award for Harmony in 1999, the Young Achiever Award for Indo-American Society in 2001 and the Zee Existence Award in 2007. She has been nominated twice for the Sotheby's Prize for Contemporary Art, in 1998 and 2000.

== Bibliography ==
- Dodiya, Anju (2021). Breathing On Mirrors.
- Dodiya, Anju (2012). Room for Erasures.
