= Jitish Kallat =

Indian artist

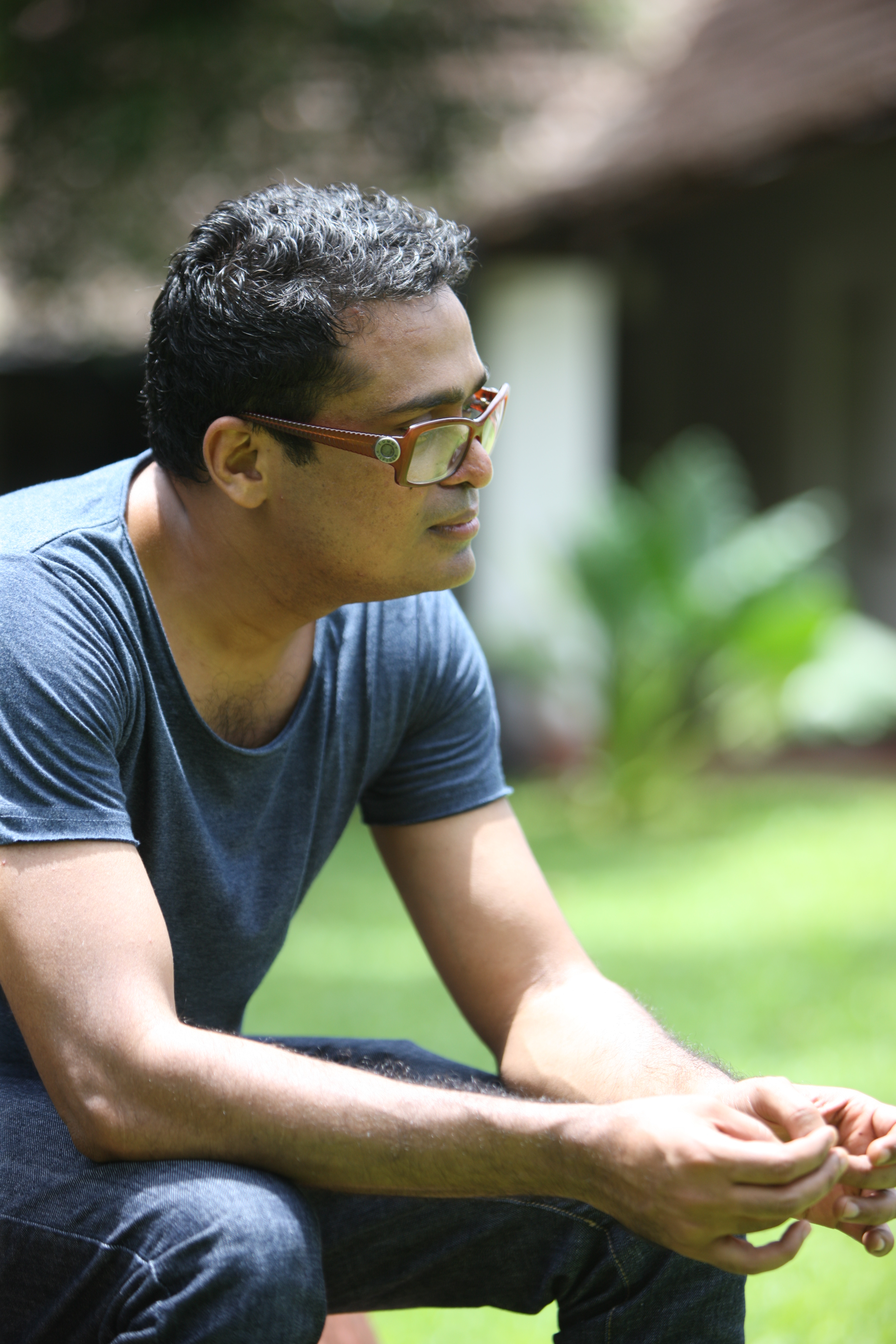
- Jitsh Kallat at the Experimenter Curator's Hub 2015
- Born: 14 July 1974 (age 52); Mumbai, India
- Occupation: Artist
- Website: https://jitishkallat.com/

Jitish Kallat (born 1974, Mumbai) is an Indian contemporary artist. He lives and works in Mumbai, India. Kallat's work includes painting, photography, collages, sculpture, installations and multimedia works. He was the Artistic Director of the second edition of the Kochi-Muziris Biennale, held in Kochi in 2014. Kallat is currently represented by Nature Morte, New Delhi, Chemould Prescott Road, Mumbai, ARNDT, Berlin and Galerie Daniel Templon in France and Belgium. He also sits on the Board of Trustees of the India Foundation for the Arts. He is married to the artist Reena Saini Kallat.

== Education ==
Jitish Kallat was born in 1974 in Mumbai, India. In 1996 he received his Bachelor of Fine Arts degree in painting from the Sir JJ School of Art in Mumbai.

== Career ==
Having received his BFA in painting in 1996, Kallat had his debut solo exhibition titled "PTO" at Chemould Prescott Road. His large-format paintings and drawings already had in them the themes that would recur throughout his work until today. With the self at the centre of an unfolding narrative, these paintings were connected to ideas of time, death, cycles of life, references to the celestial, and familial ancestry. It was only in the next three or four years that an image of the city, otherwise seen at the margins of his paintings, began to take centre stage. In those days Kallat referred to the city street as his university, often carrying within it pointers to the perennial themes of life that have remained a subtext to his work that have taken form in diverse media. "Other indigenous painters before him had flirted with international styles such as Pop (most notably Jyothi Bhatt and Bhupen Khakhar ) and the mix and match of Postmodernism (namely Gulammohammed Sheikh and Atul Dodiya), but no one had turned the textures and surfaces of urban India into the fracture of painting quite so successfully," noted artist, gallerist, and co-director of Nature Morte, Peter Nagy in an essay titled "Jitish Kallat: 21st Century Boy". "Parts of Kallat's canvases appear as if they had been left outdoors during the monsoon season, other sections seem blistered and scorched by the unrelenting sun. The works usually appear much older than they actually are, aged as soon as they are born, not unlike all manner of objects and people through the subcontinent. The distressed and tortured surfaces create a field in which to submerge images while the images themselves are processed and mutilated in a variety of ways. All of which combine to create works that both participate intimately with the artist's mise en scene and comment upon the unique idiosyncrasies of his home. Degradation, bastardisation, the destruction and retrieval of culture and history became Kallat's subjects through the astute handling of both subject matter and technique."

Kallat’s work has also developed in response to museum collections in the case of projects such as "Field Notes, (Tomorrow was here yesterday) (2011)" at the Dr Bhau Daji Lad Museum, Mumbai, for which he was shortlisted for The Skoda Prize in 2012, or "Circa," at the Ian Potter Museum in Melbourne. Both these projects had several of his recurring preoccupations find their form and structure in conversation with the museum viewed both as an infrastructure of signs but equally a field of stimuli and meaning.

Often works which begin with a private narrative or an autobiographical impulse might be materialized in a form where the self remains invisible within the space of the artwork and could often be traced back by observing several bodies of work alongside each other. The theme of time, for instance, could be rendered as date in works such as Public Notice 3, where two historical moments are overlaid like a palimpsest or in works such as Epilogue, every moon that his father saw in his lifetime becomes a labyrinth of fullness and emptiness with the image of the moon morphing with the form of a meal.

Kallat is known for working with a variety of media, including painting, large-scale sculpture installations, photography, and video art. He employs a bold and vivid visual language that references both Asian and European artistic traditions, along with popular advertising imagery that fuels urban consumerism. Kallat regularly exploits images and materials chanced upon around Mumbai's sprawling metropolis, affording his works an inherent spontaneity and a handcrafted aesthetic. He unites these various media through themes that endure within Kallat's work, such as the relationship between the individual and the masses. He references his own personal experiences and those of Mumbai's other inhabitants. His work speaks of both the self and the collective, fluctuating between intimacy and monumentality, and characterized by contrasting themes of pain, hope and survival.

Kallat's paintings address the problem of painting in an age dominated by mass media, writes art dealer and collector, Amrita Jhaveri, in A Guide to 101 Modern & Contemporary Indian Artists. "Using images from newspapers and magazines, advertising billboards, wallpaper and graffiti, his works are richly layered and replete with metaphor. Kallat has reinvented the painted surface to mimic the appearance of a television still or a computer monitor, complete with its surface striations and auras."

== Work ==
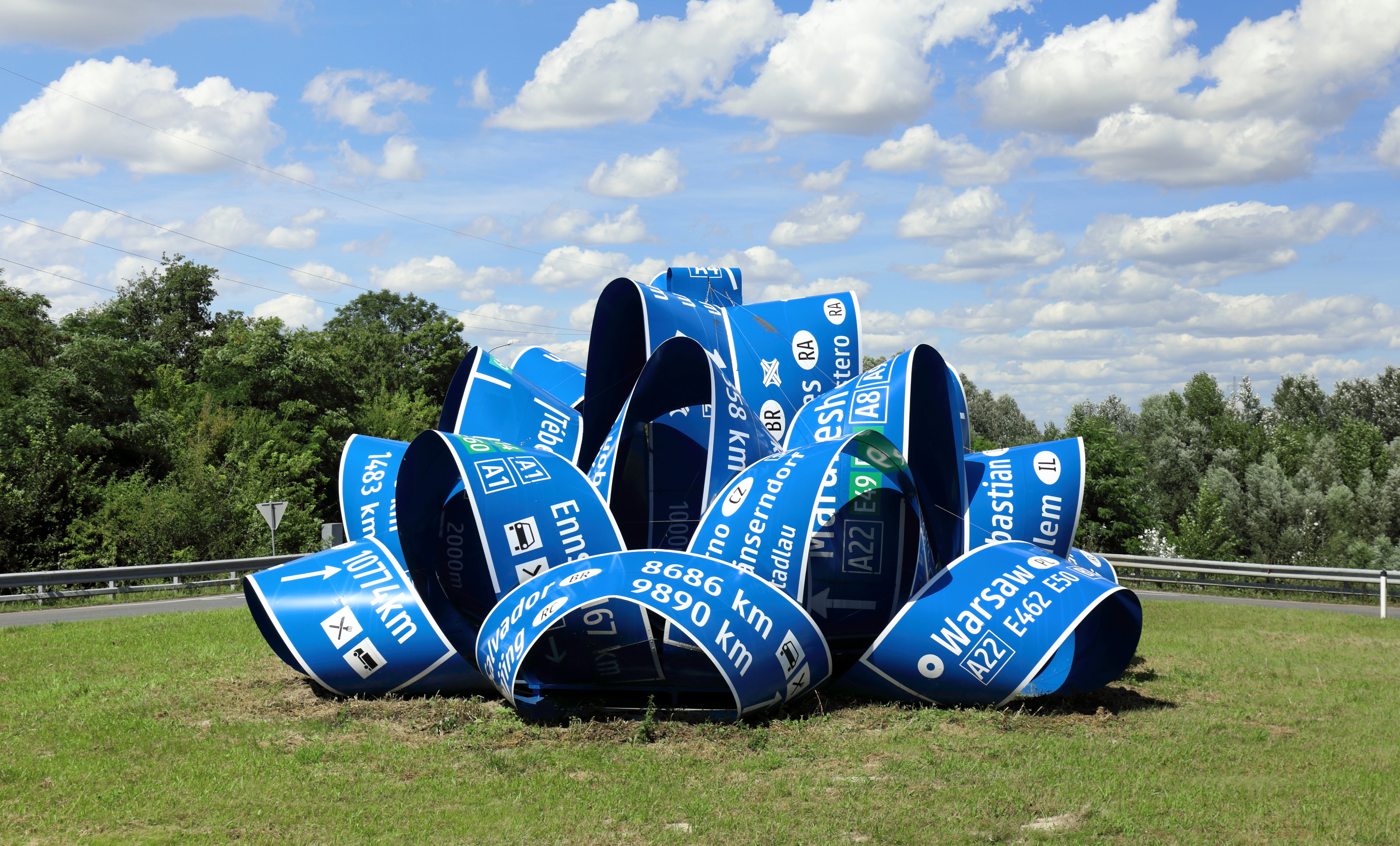
Artwork „Here After Here After Here“ in Stockerau, Austria

Much of Kallat’s work has been based on his encounters with the multi-sensory environment of Bombay/Mumbai, as well as the economic, political and historical events that have contributed to its making, wrote art historian Chaitanya Sambrani. "His practice as painter has frequently highlighted a concern he shares with the founders of Indian modernism in visual and literary art. Kallat has couched his references to the “underdog” in a hyper-pop language in order to signal the ironies that attend the lives of migrant workers and menial labourers in India’s megacities: people met on “second class” train compartments, people whose labour continues to keep afloat the nation’s aspirations. In his installation and video practice, he has often revisited archival texts and museum displays with a view to probing the production and dissemination of knowledge."

In her essay, "The Mumbai Syndrome," Patricia Ellis vouches for Kallat's engagement with painting as a subversively radical activity. "His approach has little to do with representation, abstraction, or formalism, but rather a total mimesis of concept," His paintings are "not localised images constrained within borders, complications of space and perception, or even platitudes of self-defined invention. They're conceived as liminal gaps: peripheral mediations, metaphysical platforms of interconnection."

Public Notice

For the first in what would be termed as his Public Notice series, Kallat revisited the famous speech made by Prime Minister Pandit Jawaharlal Nehru before the stroke of midnight on 14 August 1947, to commemorate India's Independence against the British. Often recalled as the "Tryst with Destiny" speech, the historic address spoke of India's awakening into freedom after centuries of colonialism. Kallat hand-rendered the iconic text using rubber adhesive on five large acrylic mirrors before setting them aflame, thereby incinerating the words and producing mangled reflections that changed in relation to the viewer's position against the burnt glass. The 2003 piece was a political statement Kallat was making against the carnage of the Godhra Riots in February 2002. "The words are cremated... much as the content of the speech itself was distorted by the way the nation has conducted itself in the last six decades," Kallat has said about the work.

Public Notice 2

Created in 2007, Kallat's Public Notice 2 is a large-scale display of letters formed out of 4,479 pieces of fibreglass bones installed on shelves against a background of saturated turmeric yellow reproducing the 1000-word speech given by Mahatma Gandhi on 11 March 1930 at the Sabarmati Ashram by the banks of the River Sabarmati in Ahmedabad a day before he along with 78 of his followers began the historic Dandi March to protest against the British-imposed tax on salt during which the virtues of Non-Violence were repeatedly insisted on by Gandhi. "The act of rehearsing a text from modern history and meditating on its relevance today is charged with a revisionary historicism: Kallat simultaneously places the text within its particular historical moment and reinvigorates it for present purposes," art historian Chaitanya Sambrani wrote in an essay titled Of Bones and Salt: Jitish Kallat's Public Notice 2. "The first activity, that of historical situation, locates the text securely in the past; the second asks us to reconsider it so as to glean an insight into present exigences and possibilities for the future." The work, according to Sambrani, represents "evidence of the past, scientifically gathered, enumerated, classified and sorted into significant units."

Public Notice 3

In 2010 the artist installed his large-scale site-specific LED installation, Public Notice 3, at the Art Institute of Chicago. This installation was Kallat's first major exhibition at a US institution. The artwork links two disparate yet connected historical events, the First World Parliaments of Religions, held in September 1893, and the much later terrorist attacks on the World Trade Center and the Pentagon, in September 2001. Kallat's 2004 piece Detergent could be seen as the prototype for Public Notice 3, a text-based work in which Swami Vivekananda's speech was rendered in the same way as in Public Notice. According to Madhuvanti Ghose, "Finally, Kallat's Detergent came 'home' when as Public Notice 3 it opened on September 11, 2010, at the Art Institute of Chicago. Swami Vivekananda's evocative words calling for universal toleration and the end of bigotry and religious fanaticism were presented on the Woman's Board Grand Staircase, a space approximating the stages of the two temporary halls in which he originally spoke: the Hall of Columbus, where his opening address had been delivered; and the Hall of Washington-an area now largely occupied by the museum's Ryerson Library-where Vivekananda spoke on other occasions during the World's Parliament of Religions."
