= Percy Macqueen =

British colonial administrator, folklorist (1883–1970)

Percy MacQueen
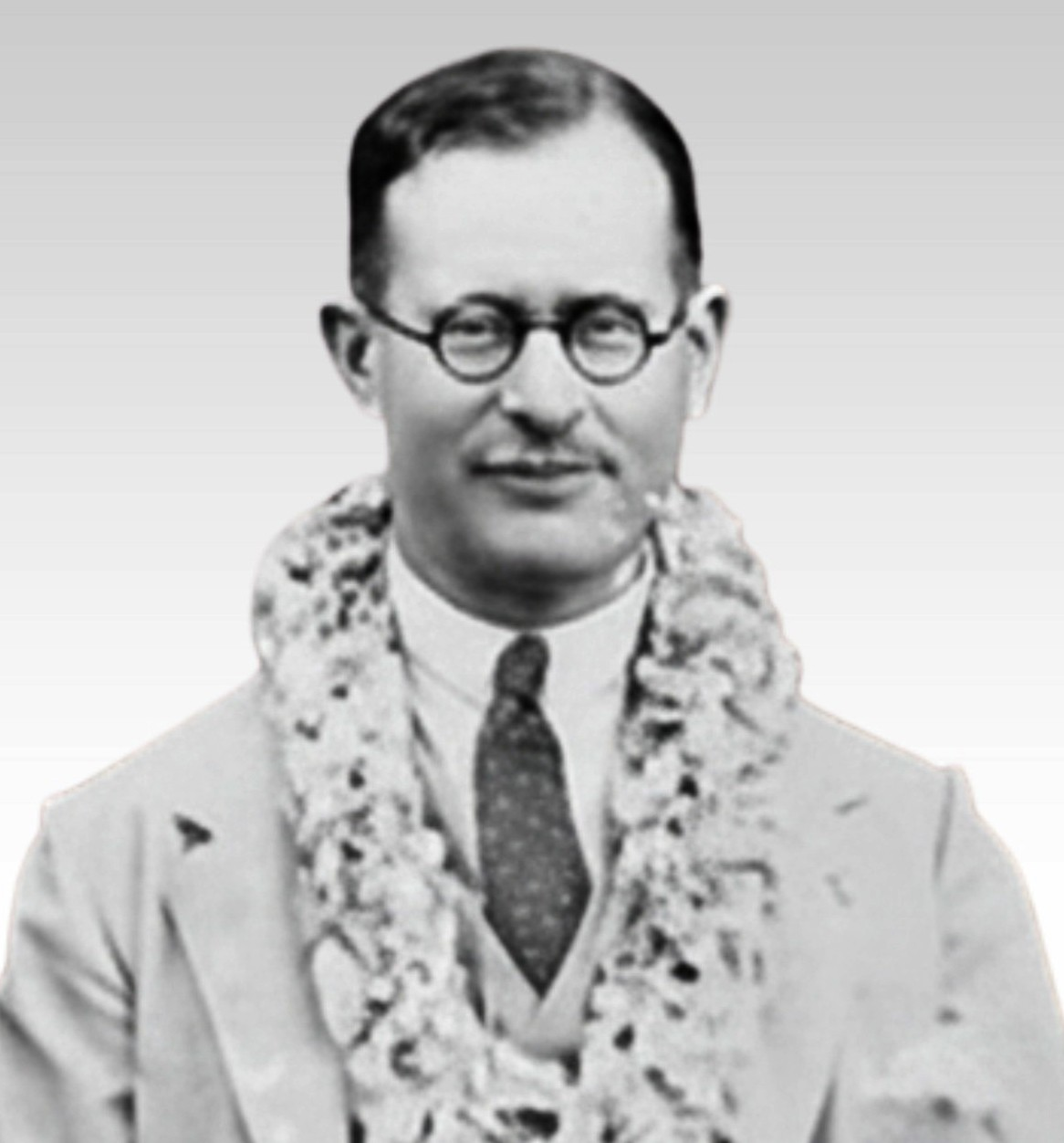
- Born: 13 November 1883
- Died: 8 March 1970 (aged 86)
- Education: Selwyn College, Cambridge
- Occupations: Colonial administrator, folklorist, linguist, poet
- Known for: Documenting South Indian folklore, publishing spoken Tamil grammar
- Parent: A. MacQueen

Percy MacQueen (13 November 1883 – 8 March 1970) was a British colonial administrator, folklorist, and poet who served in the Madras Presidency of British India. Spending nearly four decades in South India, MacQueen is noted for his extensive documentation of colloquial Tamil and his preservation of the region's oral traditions, including those in the Malayalam and Badaga languages.

== Early life and education ==
Percy MacQueen was born in 1883 to A. MacQueen. He received his higher education at Selwyn College, Cambridge. While comprehensive details regarding his academic focus remain sparse, surviving biographical accounts suggest he was a scholar of mathematics during his time at the university.

== Administrative career ==
MacQueen spent thirty-eight years living and working in South India as an administrator in the Indian Civil Service. He served as the District Collector across several major administrative centers in the Madras Presidency, including Madras, Trichy, and Tirunelveli.

He is particularly associated with the Nilgiris district, where he served as Collector for two distinct terms: from 1936 to 1938, and again from 1938 to 1940. During this time, he resided in the hill station of Ootacamund (Ooty), the summer capital of the Presidency. Beyond his roles as a district magistrate and revenue officer, MacQueen also served as a curator at the Tamil Nadu State Archives.

== Folklore and linguistic contributions ==
Unlike many of his colonial contemporaries who focused solely on classical texts, MacQueen developed a deep interest in the everyday, spoken forms of South Indian languages and the oral traditions of the common people.

=== Folklore collections ===
MacQueen extensively documented the folk songs, ballads, and folktales of the Tamil, Malayalam, and Badaga-speaking populations. He interacted directly with local informants, often compensating working-class singers with a few annas to record their traditional art forms.

His collection encompassed a wide variety of subjects, including famine, local goddesses, caste dynamics, philosophical musings on the impermanence of life, and tales of social bandits. Notably, he collected material related to contemporary political events, translating oral war propaganda songs that referenced Adolf Hitler, Napoleon, and Germany during the World War II era.

Among his most significant acquisitions was a copy of the Kovalan Kathai, a localized ballad rooted in the ancient Tamil epic Silappatikaram. MacQueen obtained this manuscript from Palakkad in the South Malabar region with the assistance of Rao Bahadur Chinnasami Pillai, the municipal chairman of the town, noting its immense value in understanding early Tamil customs.

=== Philology and grammar ===
In 1943, MacQueen published a grammar of spoken Tamil in Ootacamund. Priced affordably at 1 rupee and 12 annas, the work was a rarity; very few administrators had attempted to formalize the grammar of the colloquial language rather than its classical, literary counterpart (Centamil).

His private collections, which he meticulously organized, contained numerous handwritten documents on Tamil grammar, clippings, copies of older missionary grammars, and early 19th-century conversation manuals originally designed to train British civil servants.

=== Archival donations ===
Although he did not publish his folklore collections during his lifetime, MacQueen ensured their preservation through institutional donations. In 1946, he donated a portion of his vernacular song collection to the University of Madras. Later, between 1957 and 1961, he bequeathed a massive, three-part manuscript collection of Tamil, Malayalam, and Badaga folk poetry to the Cambridge University Library, which included around thirty-five annotated and translated children's songs.

== Literary works ==
In addition to his linguistic research, MacQueen was a published poet and historian. Three known collections of his poetry were printed during his lifetime:

- Toda Land (1939) – A 12-page poem reflecting his time in the Nilgiris (home to the indigenous Toda people).
- Seven Short Poems (1940)
- A Farewell to India and Other South Indian Verse (1957)
- The Elements of Public Administration (1935)

He also authored The Pudukottai: A Portrait, a historical and photographic account of the princely Pudukkottai State and its rulers.

== Legacy ==
For many years, MacQueen was largely overlooked in standard historical rosters of twentieth-century British folklorists, primarily because his primary folklore collections remained unpublished manuscripts. However, modern scholars of Tamil literature and South Asian folklore recognize him as a significant figure who bridged the gap between colonial administration and genuine, ground-level ethnography, distinct for his focus on non-elite informants and colloquial grammar.
