= Reena Saini Kallat =

Indian artist

- Born: 1973 (age 52–53); New Delhi, India
- Known for: Visual arts, installation art, Contemporary Art
- Spouse: Jitish Kallat
- Website: www.reenakallat.com

Reena Saini Kallat (born 1973) is an Indian visual artist. She lives and works in Mumbai.

== Early life ==
Reena Saini Kallat was born in 1973 in Delhi, India. She graduated from Sir Jamsetjee Jeejebhoy School of Art in 1996 with a B.F.A. in painting.

== Career ==
Saini Kallat's work has been the subject of many exhibitions in venues all over the world, including the Museum of Modern Art (MOMA), New York; the Migros Museum of Contemporary Art, Zurich; Tate Modern, London; the Astrup Fearnley Museum of Modern Art, Oslo; the Museum Arnhem, Netherlands; the Art Gallery of New South Wales, Sydney; and the National Museum of Modern and Contemporary Art, Seoul.

=== Selected Solo Exhibitions ===
- Orchard of Home-grown Secrets, Gallery Chemould, Mumbai and Pundole Art Gallery, Mumbai (1998)
- Skin, Gallery Chemould, Mumbai and Art Inc. Gallery, New Delhi (2000)
- Seven Faces of Dust, Chicago Radio, Mumbai (2002)
- The Battlefield Is The Mind, Sakshi Gallery, Bangalore (2002)
- Black Flute, Gallery Chemould, Mumbai 2004
- Black Flute (And Other Stories), Nature Morte, New Delhi (2005)
- Rainbow of Refuse, Bodhi Art Gallery, Mumbai (2006)
- Subject to Change without Notice, Walsh Gallery, Chicago (2008)
- Silt of Seasons, Chemould Prescott Road, Mumbai (2008)
- Drift, Primo Marella Gallery, Milan (2009)
- Labyrinth of Absences, Nature Morte, New Delhi (2011)
- Anatomy of forking paths, Art Houz, Art Chennai (2014)
- ZegnArt Public project with Dr. Bhau Daji Lad Museum, Mumbai (2013)
- Falling Fables, part of Maximum India at the Kennedy Centre, Washington 2011
- Offsite, Public Art Project, Vancouver Art Gallery (2015)
- Porous Passages, Nature Morte, New Delhi
- Hyphenated Lives, Chemould Prescott Road, Mumbai
- Blind Spots, Chemould Prescott Road, Mumbai
- Shifting Ecotones, Moca London, London (2019)
- Common Ground, Compton Verney, Warwickshire (2022)
- Leaking Lines, Firstsite, Colchester (2022)
- Deep Rivers Run Quiet, Kunstmuseum Thun, Switzerland (2023)
- Fluid Geographies, Outdoor Project for the 75th anniversary of Geoffrey Bawa’s Estate at Lunuganga, Bentota, Sri Lanka (2023)

=== Selected Group Exhibitions ===
- Varsha '95, Y. B. Chavan Gallery, Mumbai (1995)
- Monsoon Show, Jehangir Art Gallery, Mumbai (1996)
- Fresh Work, Birla Academy of Art and Culture, Mumbai (1997)
- Essays in Time, Kinetic Sculptures, Nehru Centre, Mumbai (1998)
- Edge of the Century, Academy of Fine Arts and Literature, New Delhi (1999)
- AOM- Art on the move, New Delhi (2001)
- Big River 2, CCA7 Gallery, Port of Spain, Trinidad (2001)
- Crossing Borders, Gallery Windkracht 13, Den Helder, Holland (2002)
- Reclaim Our Freedom, Pundole Art Gallery, Mumbai (2002)
- Crosscurrents, Jehangir Art Gallery, Mumbai (2002)
- Contemporary Art from India, Oslo, Norway (2003)
- Indians + Cowboys, Gallery 4A, Sydney (2003)
- Tiranga, India Habitat Centre, New Delhi (2003)
- Hard Copy, Gallery 88, Calcutta (2003)
- Crossing generations: diVERGE, National Gallery of Modern Art, Mumbai (2003)
- Zoom! Art in Contemporary India, The Culturgest Museum, Lisbon, Portugal (2004)
- Contemporary Art from India, Thomas Erben Gallery, New York (2004)
- Indian Paintings of the New Millennium, Thomas J. Walsh Art Gallery, Fairfield University, USA (2005)
- Span, Sakshi Gallery, Mumbai (2005)
- Mom and Pop Art, Walsh Gallery, Chicago (2005)
- India Express – Art and Popular Culture, Art Museum Tennis palace, (2006)
- Hungry God- Indian Contemporary Art, Arario Gallery, Beijing and Busan MoMA (2006)
- Lille 3000 (Maximum City-Mumbai), Lille, France (2006)
- Modern Indian Works on Paper, Arthur Ross Gallery, Philadelphia and the Georgia Museum of Art, USA (2006)
- Thermocline of Art- New Asian Waves, Center for Art and Media Karlsruhe, Germany (2007)
- New Narratives: Contemporary Art From India, Chicago Cultural Centre (2007)
- India Now: Contemporary Indian Art between Continuity and Transformation, curated by Daniela Palazzoli, Spazio Oberdan, Milan (2007)
- Urban Manners, at Hangar Bicocca, Milan (2007)
- Soft Power: Asian Attitude, Shanghai Zendai Museum of Modern Art, Shanghai (2007)
- Incheon Women Artists' Biennale, Incheon, South Korea (2007)
- Excavation: Memory/Myth/Membrane, Museum Gallery, Mumbai (2008)
- Three Points of view, Galerie Mirchandani + Steinrucke, Mumbai (2008)
- 3rd Nanjing Triennale, China (2008)
- India Moderna, IVAM Museum, Valencia, Spain (2008)
- Chalo! India: A New Era of Indian Art, Mori Art Museum, Japan (2008)
- Indian Narratives in the 21st Century: Between Memory and History, Casa Asia, Madrid and Barcelona (2009)
- Low Blow: And Other Species of Confusion, Stux gallery, New York (2009)
- INDIA XIANZAI: Contemporary Indian Art, Museum of Contemporary Art Shanghai (2009)
- Ventosul Biennale, Curitiba, Brazil (2009)
- View Points and Viewing points – Asian Art Biennale, National Taiwan Museum of Fine Arts (2009)
- Urban Manners 2, Contemporary Artists from India, SESC Pompeia, São Paulo (2010)
- The Empire Strikes Back, Saatchi Gallery, London (2010)
- In Transition: New Art from India, Vancouver International Sculpture Biennale, Vancouver (2010)
- Roundabout, Tel Aviv Museum of Art, Israel (2011)
- Pandemonium: Art in a Time of Creativity Fever, Goteborg International Biennale for Contemporary Art, (2011)
- Maximum India, The John F. Kennedy Center for the Performing Arts, Washington (2011)
- Samtidigt, Helsinki City Art Museum, Finland] (2011)
- India: Art Now, Arken Museum of Modern Art, Copenhagen, Denmark (2012)
- JJ's 90s – The Time of Change, Mumbai Sir J.J. School of Art, Mumbai] (2013)
- The Eye and The Mind: New Interventions in Indian Art, Minsheng Art Museum, Beijing
- Aperture, Indian Summer Festival, Old Canadian Pacific Railway Station, Vancouver
- The Eye and The Mind: New Interventions in Indian Art, China Art Museum, Shanghai
- One and one make eleven (Contemporary Art From India), Kunsthaus Langenthal, Switzerland (2015)
- The Eye and The Mind: New Interventions in Indian Art, Guangdong Museum of Art, Guangzhou, China (2015)
- [en]counters 2015, Spaces in Transition, CST Terminus, Mumbai (2015)
- Kalaghoda Art Festival, Mumbai (2015)
- Insecurities: tracing Displacement and Shelter, organized by Sean Anderson and Ariele Dionne-Krosnick, The Museum of Modern Art, New York (2015)
- Hybridizing Earth, Discussing Multitude, 10th Busan Biennale, curated by Cheagab Yun, Kiswire Suyeong factory, Busan, South Korea (2016)
- Conceiving Space, Colombo Art Biennial, curated by Alnoor Mitha, Sri Lanka (2016)
- Make a Change, curated by Torun Ekstrand, Cultural Ronneby, Sweden (2016)
- Tabiyat: Medicine and Healing in India, curated by Ratan Vaswani, CSMVS (Chhatrapati Shivaji Maharaj Vastu Sangrahalaya), Mumbai (2016)
- The Eye and The Mind: New Interventions in Indian Art, NGMA- Jaipur House, New Delhi(2016)
- I don't want to be there when it happens, curated by Eugenio Viola Perth Institute of Contemporary Arts, Australia (2017)
- Memories of Partition, Manchester Museum, UK (2017)
- India Re-worlded: Seventy years of Investigating a Nation, curated by Arshiya Lokhandwala, Gallery Odyssey, Mumbai (2017)
- On the Horizon the Shadow Speaks another story, curated by November Paynter, Museum of Contemporary Art, Toronto (2017)
- Sculpture Park at Madhavendra Palace, Nahargarh Fort, Jaipur (2017)
- Make a Change, curated by Torun Ekstrand, Norrtalje Museum + Konsthall, Sweden (2017)
- Borders: Us and Them, curated by Qian Lin, NYU Shanghai Art Gallery, China (2017)
- Transforming Vision: 21st century art from the Pizzuti Collection, Pizzuti Collection, Columbus, Ohio (2017)
- Connecting Threads: Textiles in Contemporary Practice, curated by Tasneem Mehta and Puja Vaish, Bhau Daji Lad Museum, Mumbai (2018)
- Animals: Art, Science, Nature, Society, curated by Jeffrey Shaw, CityU Exhibition Gallery, Hong Kong (2018)
- Untold Stories Manifesto, curated by Valentina Levy, 2nd edition of Something Else OFF Biennale Cairo, Egypt (2018)
- Sculpture Park at Madhavendra Palace, curated by Peter Nagy, Nahargarh Fort, Jaipur (2018)
- Vision Exchange: Perspectives from India to Canada, curated by Catherine Crowston and Jonathan Shaughnessy, Art Gallery of Alberta (2018)
- Fearless: Contemporary South Asian Art, curated by Natalie Seiz, Art Gallery of New South Wales, Sydney (2018)
- Tate Exchange – Building an Art Biennale, curated by Sunil Maghnani and Ed D’Souza, Tate Modern London (2018)
- Facing India, curated by Dr. Uta Ruhkamp, Kunstmuseum Wolfsburg, Germany (2018)
- Asymmetrical Objects, curated by Tasneem Zakaria Mehta, Dr. Bhau Daji Lad Museum, Mumbai (2018)
- Sensorium: The End is Only the Beginning, Sunaparanta, Goa (2018)
- 2020 Horniman Circle Gardens, Mumbai, India (2018)
- When Home Won't Let You Stay: Migration through Contemporary Art, curated by Eva Respini and Ruth Erickson, The Institute of Contemporary Art, Boston (2019)
- Tomorrow's Tigers, commissioned Rugs, Royal Academy of Art, London (2019)
- Open Borders, 14th Curitiba International Biennial, curated by Adolfo Montejo Navas and Tereza de Arruda, Museum Oscar Niemeyer, Brazil (2019)
- Continental Shift: Contemporary Art and South Asia, curated by Rodney James, Bunjil Place Gallery, Victoria, Australia (2019)
- The Construction of the Possible, curated by the team at Wifredo Lam Centre for Contemporary Art, 13TH Havana Biennial, Cuba (2019)
- Vision Exchange: Perspectives from India to Canada, curated by Catherine Crowston and Jonathan Shaughnessy, Winnipeg Art Gallery, Canada (2019)
- Alteration/Activation/Abstraction, curated by Betty Seid, Sundaram Tagore Gallery, New York (2019)
- Vision Exchange: Perspectives from India to Canada, curated by Catherine Crowston and Jonathan Shaughnessy, National Gallery of Canada (2019)
- Making Art: Materials & Technology, Piramal Museum of Art, Mumbai (2019)
- Distilled Blueprints, curated by Veerangana Solanki, Alembic group, Baroda (2019)
- The Idea of the Acrobat, Bikaner House, New Delhi (2020)
- Potential Worlds 1: Planetary Memories, curated by Heike Munder and Suad Garayeva-Maleki, Migros Museum of Contemporary Art, Zurich (2020)
- Displaced: Contemporary Artists Confront The Global Refugee Crisis, curated by Irene Hofmann and Brandee Caoba, SITE Santa Fe, New Mexico (2020)
- Unflattening, The National Museum of Modern and Contemporary Art, Korea (2020)
- TRILOGY: After Hope, Asian Art Museum of San Francisco, CA (2020)
- Escape Routes, curated by Apinan Poshyananda, Bangkok Art Biennale (2020)
- Visions from India: 21st Century Art from the Pizzuti Collection, Curated by Catherine Walworth, Columbia Museum of Art, South Carolina (2020)
- When Home Won’t Let You Stay: Migration through Contemporary Art curated by Eva Respini and Ruth Erickson, The Minneapolis Institute of Art, USA (2020)
- Vision Exchange: Perspectives from India to Canada, Curated by Catherine Crowston and Jonathan Shaughnessy, The McKenzie Art Gallery in Regina, Saskatchewan, Canada (2020)
- 3rd International Biennial of Asuncion Paraguay Curatorial team: Dannys Montes de Oca, Bettina Brizuela, Damian Cabrera and Omar Estrada, Paraguay (2020)
- Women artists from Asia: Dancing Queen, Arario Gallery Cheonan (2020)
- Holding Space, South South Veza, Online Viewing Rooms (OVR's) by 50+ galleries (2021)
- After Hope: Videos of Resistance, Lee Gallery, South Carolina, USA (2021)
- Tree Story curated by Charlotte Day, MUMA Melbourne (2021)
- When Home Won’t Let You Stay: Migration through Contemporary Art, curated by Eva Respini and Ruth Erickson, Cantor Arts Centre at Stanford University (2021)
- Making Worlds, Sydney Modern Project, Art Gallery of New South Wales, Sydney (2022)
- Tomorrow’s Tigers, Sotheby's, UK (2022)
- Yet, With Love curated by Seolhui Lee, Podo Museum, South Korea (2022)
- Inner life of things: Around Anatomies and Armatures curated by Roobina Karode, Kiran Nadar Museum of Art, Noida (2022)
- Legal Alien curated by Meera Menezes, Bikaner House, New Delhi (2022)
- Back to the Roots – Reena Kallat & Melanie Siegel, curated by Julia Berghoff, Kunstverein Reutlingen, Germany (2023)
- What POWER does to us – About privileges, risks and opportunities, Vögele Kultur Zentrum, Switzerland (2023)
- No But Where Are You Really From?, Public Art Project supported by The Gallery and Artichoke Trust, UK (2023)
- Between Borders, Museum Arnhem, Netherlands (2023)
- RHIZOME Tracing Ecocultural Identities, Chhatrapati Shivaji Maharaj Vastu Sangrahalaya, Mumbai (2023)
- After Hope: Videos of Resistance, Peabody Essex Museum, USA (2023)
- Thinking Historically in the Present Sharjah Biennial, United Arab Emirates (2023)
- Aesthetic Responses, The Culture Story, Singapore (2024)

=== Artist residencies ===
In 2002 Kallat was an artist-in-residence in the Laurentian mountains of Quebec at the Boreal Art and Nature Centre in Canada. In 2011 she was awarded an IASPIS residency to work and study in Gothenburg, Sweden.

== Awards ==
Saini Kallat has been the recipient of a number of awards, including:

- Gladstone Solomon Award (1995)
- Bombay Art Society Merit Certificate (1996)
- Second Prize Government Award, Sir Jamsetjee Jeejebhoy School of Art (1996)
- Harmony Award (2005)
- YFLO ZOYA Young Women Achievers Awards 2010–11, Delhi (2011)
- ZegnArt Public Award in collaboration with Dr. Bhaudaji Lad Museum, Mumbai (2012)
- Zee: Indian Women Awards in Arts & Culture category, Delhi (2016)
- Artist Of The Year: Hello Fame of Awards (2019)

== Public Collections ==
- Art Gallery of New South Wales, Sydney
- Arario Corporation Collection, South Korea
- Burger Collection, Hongkong
- Bhau Daji Lad Museum, Mumbai
- Chau Chak Wing Museum, the University of Sydney
- Devi Art Foundation, New Delhi
- Fondazione Golinelli, Italy
- JSW Foundation, Mumbai
- Kiran Nadar Museum of Art, New Delhi
- Manchester Museum, UK
- Musee de Beaux Arts, Ottawa
- National Taiwan Museum of Fine Arts, Taichung
- National Gallery of Modern Art, New Delhi
- Nita Mukesh Ambani Cultural Centre (NMACC), Mumbai
- Norrtalje Konsthall, Sweden
- Pizzuti Collection, Ohio
- Sharjah Art Foundation, UAE
- ir H.N. Reliance Foundation Hospital and Research Centre, Mumbai
- Tiroche DeLeon Collection, Israel
- Vancouver Art Gallery, Canada
