= Indian Memory Project =

The Indian Memory Project is an online archive that aims to trace the history of the Indian subcontinent using images and narratives offered by families and individuals in several countries. It was founded in February 2010 by Indian photographer Anusha Yadav. The ongoing project attempts to convey in a unified way the history of the subcontinent, its experiences, humanity, choices and its circumstances that have made the region and its people who they are. It is also intended to promote greater tolerance, understanding, and capacity for learning among the citizens of India, its neighbouring countries and the world.

The project employs photographs, contextualised narratives and letters found in personal archives, highlighting themes such as social transformation, new professions, partition, education, war, marriage, religion and culture, and the impact they had on families living during these times. With personal images serving as evidence, each post on the archive reveals information about people, families and ancestors, cultures, lifestyles, traditions, choices, circumstances and thereby consequences. Indian Memory Project has received images from families and people based in Canada, USA, Ireland, Bangladesh, Pakistan, India, United Kingdom. Currently the oldest photograph is from 1860.

The project received an honorary mention in the Digital Communities category at the 2013 Prix Ars Electronica, Austria.
