= Chamarajendra Academy of Visual Arts =

Visual Arts school in Mysore, India

Coordinates: 12.310779°N 76.682534°E

Chamarajendra Academy of Visual Arts (CAVA) is a visual art school in Mysore, in the state of Karnataka in India. The academy is affiliated to the University of Mysore and offers courses in drawing, painting, sculpture, graphics, applied arts, photography and photo-journalism and art history. CAVA awards degrees in Bachelor of Fine Arts (BFA) and Master of Fine Arts (MFA).

== History ==
CAVA was started by the Maharaja of Mysore Krishnaraja Wodeyar IV in 1906 as the Chamarajendra Technical Institute. The foundation stone of the building, dedicated to Maharaja Chamarajendra Wodeyar, was laid by George V of the United Kingdom. It was built at a cost of Rs. 2.5 lakhs, and completed in 1913. It is an elaborately composed structure which runs along the road. It has a rectangular facade, which is composed of pedimented dormers and gables. The institute is close to the city's railway station, on Sayyaji Rao road, a busy road with several commercial establishments.

In 1981 the Karnataka state government renamed the Chamarajendra Technical Institute as CAVA. Following the suggestions of a committee headed by the prominent Russian painter, Svetoslav Roerich, CAVA was established on the lines of the J.J. School of Arts in Mumbai. University of Mysore provided affiliation for the courses offered at CAVA, while CAVA itself was under the administration of the Department of Kannada and Culture. In 2003, the Minister of State for Kannada and Culture requested the University of Mysore to take over and completely integrate CAVA. In September 2004, there was opposition from students, who felt that CAVA would have less funds if displaced from its semi-autonomous administration under the Department of Kannada and Culture.

== Present ==
CAVA offers a five-year course in several disciplines leading to a BFA degree. The disciplines include painting, graphics, sculpture, applied art, photography and photo-journalism and history of art. Commencing from the academic year 2002-03, CAVA offers post-graduate MFA courses in painting, graphics and sculpture. Admission to the post-graduate courses is based on an eligibility test, and only those who have completed a BFA are eligible to take the test. CAVA organizes tours, seminars, and exhibitions of works executed by its students and leading artists. Student art works are also exhibited during Dasara festivities.

The Chamarajendra Technical Institute building complex is vast. It is considered to be one of the heritage buildings of Mysore, possessing neoclassical features. It shows the period architecture that evolved in Mysore under the patronage of the erstwhile Wodeyar dynasty. Today it houses the Mysore Central Library, Chamarajendra Academy for Visual Arts (CAVA) and the Kitchen Stable in Mounted Horse Company. The Chamarajendra Technical Institute building is co-located with the Cauvery Arts & Crafts Emporium, which is an all-year exhibition of local handicrafts available for purchase. By the end of 2005, the walls of these buildings had deteriorated and had developed cracks. In April 2006, The City Development Plan for Mysore, under Jawaharlal Nehru National Urban Renewal Mission (JNNURM), Annexure 5, estimated Rs 160 lakhs for the cost of repair.

== Other details ==
A unique art tradition on wood inlay is preserved at CAVA. The craft was slowly starting to fade away by the start of the century. However, in 1913, the art form had a revival when Alderson, the superintendent of the Chamarajendra Technical Institute, experimented with introducing ivory in wood inlay works. Later a noted sculptor and wood-carver, Parameshwara, introduced mythological and Persian motifs.

== Notable alumni ==
- B. V. K. Sastry, writer and music critic, completed diploma in painting in 1938
- M.S. Nanjunda Rao, founder secretary of the Karnataka Chitrakala Parishat, completed diploma in painting in 1952
- P.R.Thippeswamy, artist, folklorist and writer, former chairman of Karnataka Lalitha Kala Academy, completed diploma in painting in 1952
- N. S. Harsha, contemporary artist, received his BFA in painting in 1992

== See also ==
- List of Heritage Buildings in Mysore
- List of educational institutions in Mysore
