= The Skoda Prize =

Indian contemporary art prize

THE ŠKODA PRIZE, also known as The Škoda Prize for Indian Contemporary Art, was one of the prestigious contemporary art awards in the Indian art scene to recognize an Indian artist under 45 years of age. Announced on May 26, 2010, a total reward of Rs 1 million was awarded to artist Mithu Sen by internationally known artist Anish Kapoor after two rounds of long list and short list selection. Since 2011, the awards would also be succeeded by a book publication titled "THE ŠKODA PRIZE twenty 2011-12" featuring top twenty selected artists from the Indian contemporary scene. The winner in 2011 was Navin Thomas

The prize is sponsored by British Council, Pro Helvetia and Skoda among others. Its jury over the two years consisted of reputed artists from the Indian contemporary scene like Kiran Nadar, Vivan Sundaram and advisers to the jury includes art writer and critic Girish Shahane. In 2011, artist Jitish Kallat featured in the shortlist for THE ŠKODA PRIZE. The prize was cancelled in August 2013 as it was announced that ŠKODA would not be renewing its three-year contract to sponsor the prize.

== Winner entries ==
=== 2010 ===
The first artist to be awarded in 2010 was Mithu Sen

=== 2011 ===
The winner in 2011 was Navin Thomas

=== 2012 ===
L N Tallur won The Skoda Prize in 2012 for his exhibition named Quintessential held at Dr. Bhau Daji Lad Museum.
