= N. S. Harsha =

Indian contemporary artist from Mysore (born 1969)

- Born: 1969 (age 56–57); Mysore, India
- Education: Chamarajendra Academy of Visual Arts, Maharaja Sayajirao University
- Known for: Painting, sculpture, installation

N. S. Harsha (born 1969) is an Indian contemporary artist from Mysore. He works in many media including painting, sculpture, site-specific installation, and public works.

A major retrospective of the artist took place at the Mori Art Museum, Tokyo, in 2017.

== Early life ==
Harsha earned a BFA in painting from Chamarajendra Academy of Visual Arts, Mysore in 1992 and an MFA in painting from Maharaja Sayajirao University, Baroda in 1995.

== Work ==
His works "depict daily experiences in Mysore, southern India, where he is based, but also reflect wider cultural, political and economic globalization issues" and explore the "absurdity of the real world, representation and abstraction, and repeating images". His practice has been inspired by Indian popular and miniature painting.

== Collections ==
- Kiran Nadar Museum of Art.
- Queensland Art Gallery of Modern Art (QAGOMA)Brisbane Australia
- M HKA Antwerp, Belgium
- Mori Art Museum, Japan
- NGMA National Gallery of Modern Art, Delhi, India
- M+, Hong Kong
- National Museum of Cardiff, UK

== Exhibitions ==
=== Solo exhibitions ===
- Maison Hermes Tokyo (2008)
- INIVA, London (2009)
- DAAD, as part of the DAAD Artists-in-Berlin Program (2012–2013)
- Dallas Museum of Art (2015–2016)
- Mori Art Museum (2017)

=== Group exhibitions ===
- Asia Pacific Triennial of Contemporary Arts, Queensland Art Gallery, Brisbane, Australia (1999)
- Fukuoka Asian Art Triennial (2002)
- Singapore Binenale (2006)
- Indian Highway. Traveled to the Serpentine Gallery, London (2008), Astrup Fearnley Museum of Modern Art, Oslo (2009), Herning Art Museum, Denmark (2010), Musée d'Art Contemporain, Lyon (2011) and MAXXI, Rome (2011–12).
- Bienal de São Paulo (2010)
- the Yokohama Triennial (2011)
- Asian Art Museum, San Francisco (2012)
- Adelaide International Biennial (2012)
- Dojima Biennial, Osaka (2013)
- Moscow Bienniale of Contemporary Art (2013)
- Kochi-Muziris Biennale, India (2014)
- Biennale of Sydney (2018)

== Awards ==
- Vasudev Arnawaz Award (1992)
- Sanskriti Award (2003)
- Artes Mundi Prize (2008)
- DAAD Scholarship in (2012)
