= Mithu Sen =

Indian artist (born 1971)

- Born: 1971 (age 54–55); West Bengal, India
- Education: Visva-Bharati University
- Occupation: Conceptual artist

Mithu Sen is an Indian conceptual artist. Born in West Bengal in 1971.

== Early life and education ==
Sen was born in 1971 in West Bengal and obtained Bachelor's and master's degrees in painting from Kala Bhavan at Visva-Bharati University in Santiniketan, West Bengal. Sen moved from West Bengal to New Delhi in 1997, finding herself having to communicate in English or Hindi instead of her mother tongue, Bengali. Later, she completed a post-graduate program (visiting) at the Glasgow School of Art in the United Kingdom on the Charles Wallace India Trust Award for 2000–2001.

Sen's Bengali poetry has been published in collected volumes, as well as in magazines and journals since she was a young adult.

== Work ==
Sen's conceptual practice with a varied set of surfaces, materials, and processes that emerge in the wake of her regular negotiations with her milieu. Her work often deals with the complexities of the body in its physical, basal, erotic and sexless forms. A lot of her works deal with the self as a matrix of identities and myths – questioning societal norms, fixed beliefs, and categorisations.

Sen's material art work, which she calls "byproducts" of her larger process, contrast scale, imagery and genre to problematize existing notions of hospitality, sexuality, communication, and contract. Known for her often erotically and emotionally charged imagery, Sen's work blurs the line between distance and intimacy, often explored through what she calls "radical hospitality".

Using the virtual and the real forms of social relation and individual experience, both spontaneous and premeditated, Sen creates work fundamentally as a performer. Many of her performance-based works challenge the notion of language as a proprietary means of communication, attempting to outsmart linguistic hegemonies and codes of propriety by creating an abstract body of gibberish text she calls "non-language". Non-language, whose use creates moments of what Sen calls "lingual anarchy" employs glitch, noise, sonic affect in its spontaneous creation. Before turning to the aporias of non-communicative language, Sen was a practicing poet in Bengali. In ‘I am Ol Chiki’, Mithu Sen brings the Ol Chiki script into the landscape of a Santal village in a reclamation, a reassertion of cultural identity in a world where linguistic invisibility has become a silent form of erasure.

Sen's recent works extend from the promise of language and community to the legality of contract, opening up questions caught between law and living.

== Career and exhibitions ==
Sen was the first artist to be awarded The Skoda Prize in 2010 for Indian contemporary art. In 2015, she also won the Prudential Eye Award for the Best Emerging Artist Using Drawing.

Her selected exhibitions and projects include:

=== Solo exhibitions ===
- 'UnMYthU | Byproducts of twenty years of performance', Chemould, Mumbai, 2018
- Mit i sny (Myth and Dreams), City Gallery Arsenal, Poznan, Poland 2018.
- A ° V o i d, Galerie Krinzinger, Vienna, 2014
- Border Unseen, Eli and Edythe Broad Art Museum, Michigan USA, 2014
- Devoid, Gallery Nathalie Obadia, Paris 2012
- In House Adoption, Gallery Steph and Nature morte, Singapore 2012
- In Transit, Espace Louis Vuitton, Taipei, Taiwan, 2011
- Black Candy (iforgotmypenisathome) Chemould, Mumbai, 2010; SAA, JNU, New Delhi 2010; Max Mueller Bhavan, New Delhi, 2011
- Nothing lost in Translation, Nature Morte, Berlin 2010
- I Dig, I Look Down at Albion Gallery, London, in 2008
- Half Full – Part I at Bose Pacia, New York, in 2007
- It's Good to be Queen at Bose Pacia Artist Space, New York, in 2006
- I Hate Pink, Lakeeren Art Gallery, Mumbai, 2003
- Unbelongings, Machintosh Gallery, Glasgow, Scotland, 2001

=== Solo Performances / Projects ===
- (Un)mansplaining, Venice, 2019
- Lunch is Cancelled, Shalini Passi Art Foundation, India Art Fair, New Delhi, 2019
- 100 (Un)Silent Ways, Speaker's Forum, India Art Fair, New Delhi, 2019
- UNhome in City IF Angels, 18th Streets Art Center Los Angeles, USA, 2017
- Mis(s)Guide, PEM (Peebody Essex Museum) Salem, USA, 2016
- Aphasia, Solomon R. Guggenheim Museum & Asia Society Museum, New York, 2016
- Tongue that won't stop wounding, After Midnight, Queens Museum, New York City
- I have only one language; it is not mine, Kochi-Muziris Biennale, Kochi, 2014.
- Shop Lifting, Art Chennai, Chennai, 2014.
- I am a Poet, Word. Sound. Power, Performance at Khoj Studio, Delhi, 2014.

=== Selected group exhibitions ===
- Documenta 26, Kassel, Germany
- APT9-9@th Asia Pacific Triennale of Contemporary art, Queensland Art Gallery, Gallery of Modern Art, Australia 2018
- Contemporary Photographic and New Media Art, FotoFest International 2018 Biennial, U.S. 2018
- Facing India, : Kunstmuseum Wolfsburg, Germany 2018
- Delirium // Equilibrium, Kiran Nadar Museum of Art, New Delhi 2018
- I replace you, Kathmandu Triennale, Kathmandu, Nepal 2017
- Drawing Now, Albertina Museum, Vienna 2015
- Drawing the Bottom Line, S.M.A.K museum, Gent, Belgium 2015
- Canson Grand Prix award show, Palais De Tokyo, Paris 2015
- After Midnight | Queens Museum, New York 2015
- Kochi-Muziris Biennale, Kochi 2014
- Poems declined, Dhaka Art Summit 2014, Dhaka, Bangladesh 2014
- The Body in Indian Art, Centre for Fine Arts, Bozar Museum, Brussels.2013
- Word. Sound. Power. I am a Poet, Performance at Tate Modern Project Space, London .2013
- I chew I bite, The Unknown, Mediations Biennale, Poznań, Poland 2011
- Spheres 4, Gallery Continua, Le Moulin 2011
- Generation in transition, New art from India, Zachęta National Gallery of Art, Warsaw and CAC in Vilnius, Lithuania 2011
- Abstract Cabinet, Eastside project space, Birmingham. 2009
- Emotional Drawing, SOMA, Seoul, South Korea 2009
- Emotional Drawing, Museum of Modern Art, Tokyo 2008
- Comme des bêtes, Lausanne Museum, Berne, Switzerland 2008
- Horn Please, Kunst Museum, Berne, Switzerland 2007
- "Private / Corporate 4," Daimler Chrysler Collection, Berlin 2007

== Personal life ==
Sen lives and works in New Delhi. She is an enthusiastic traveller.
