= Ishaat Hussain =

Indian businessman

- Born: 2 September 1947 (age 78)
- Education: The Doon School; St. Stephen's College, Delhi
- Occupations: Chairman, Voltas; Director, Tata Steel, Tata Sky; Executive director, Tata Sons
- Board member of: Tata Sons, Tata Steel
- Spouse(s): Rummana Hussain (m. ?? ; died 1999)
- Children: 1

Ishaat Hussain is an Indian businessman and the former director of Tata Sons and Tata Steel, and chairman of Tata Sky. He was also chairman of the Tata Group, Voltas. Between November 2016 and September 2017, he was the interim chairman of Tata Consultancy Services, following the removal of Cyrus Mistry. He joined the Tata Group in 1981 and retired in September 2017.

In the media, he has often been called the "Wise Man of Bombay House".

== Education ==
Hussain went to The Doon School in Dehradun, and then obtained a bachelor's degree in economics from St. Stephen's College, Delhi. He then attended the advance management programme at the Harvard Business School.

== Career ==
After graduation, Hussain worked as a chartered accountant for seven years, before joining the Tata Group in 1981 In 1999, he joined the board of Tata Sons. He became chairman of Voltas in 2000, and was appointed to the board, and was the finance director, of Tata Sons. In November 2016, he was appointed interim chairman of Tata Consultancy Services, after Cyrus Mistry was removed, following the much publicised feud with the board of Tata Sons.

== Personal life ==
Ishaat was married to the conceptual artist Rummana Hussain until her death in 1999.
