= Jehangir Sabavala =

Indian artist (1922-2011)

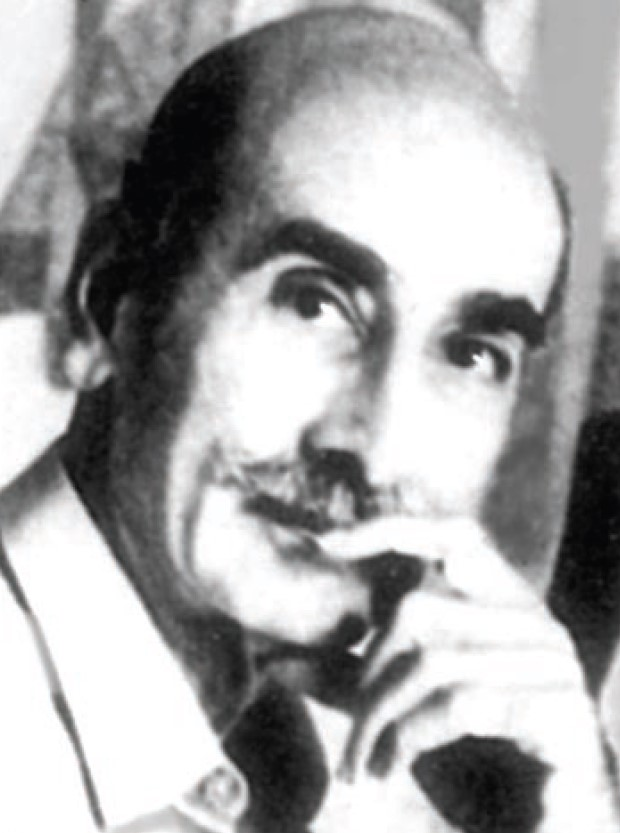
- Born: 23 August 1922; Bombay Presidency, British India
- Died: 2 September 2011 (aged 89); Mumbai, Maharashtra, India
- Education: Sir J. J. School of Art, Mumbai
- Known for: Painting
- Awards: Padma Shri (1977)

Signature
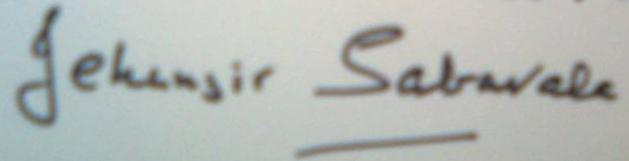

Jehangir Sabavala (23 August 1922 – 2 September 2011) was an Indian painter.

== Early life and education ==
Jehangir Ardeshir Sabavala was born to an affluent Parsi family in Bombay (now Mumbai), India. His mother belonged to the aristocratic Cowasjee Jehangir family. He studied at Cathedral and John Connon School, Elphinstone College, and earned a diploma from Mumbai's Sir J. J. School of Art in 1944. Thereafter he went to Europe and studied at the Heatherley School of Fine Art, London, (1945–1947), and in Academie Andre Lhote, Paris (1948–1951), the Académie Julian (1953–54), and finally at the Académie de la Grande Chaumière in 1957.

== Career ==
From 1951, he held 31 major solo exhibitions across the subcontinent, and in Europe. In addition, he participated in more than 150 group exhibitions all over the world. His work is in several important private and public collections, such as the National Gallery of Modern Art, New Delhi, Birla Academy of Fine Arts, Calcutta, Parliament House, New Delhi, The Punjab Government Museum, Chandigarh, Air India Mumbai, Tata Institute of Fundamental Research, Mumbai, and The National Gallery of South Australia, Adelaide.

Sabavala did not allow archives of his 12 scrapbooks on materials from the early 1940s to the 2000 online. Arun Khopkar's film on Sabavala's life and art, Colours of Absence, won the National Award in 1994. In 2010, another film about his life was made, The Inheritance of Light: Jehangir Sabavala. His last solo exhibition, Ricorso, was held at the Sakshi Gallery, Mumbai, in 2008.

In 2010, one of his serene landscapes, called Casuarina Line, fetched Rs 17 million at a Saffronart auction.

His painting Vespers 1 was sold for £253,650 (Rs. 21 million) at a Bonhams sale in London.

== Awards ==
- Padma Shri by the Government of India - 1977
- Lalit Kala Ratna, the Fellowship of Lalit Kala Akademi, India's National Academy of Arts, by the President of India - 2007

== Books on the Artist ==
- Dilip Chitre, The Reasoning Vision: Jehangir Sabavala's Painterly Universe. (Tata McGraw Hill, Mumbai 1980) ISBN 978-0-07-096622-2
- Ranjit Hoskote, Pilgrim, Exile, Sorcerer: The Painterly Evolution of Jehangir Sabavala. (Eminence Designs, Mumbai 1998) ISBN 81-900602-2-8
- Ranjit Hoskote, The Crucible of Painting: The Art of Jehangir Sabavala. (Eminence Designs/ National Gallery of Modern Art, Mumbai 2005) ISBN 81-902170-9-7
