= Atul Dodiya =

Indian artist (born 1959)

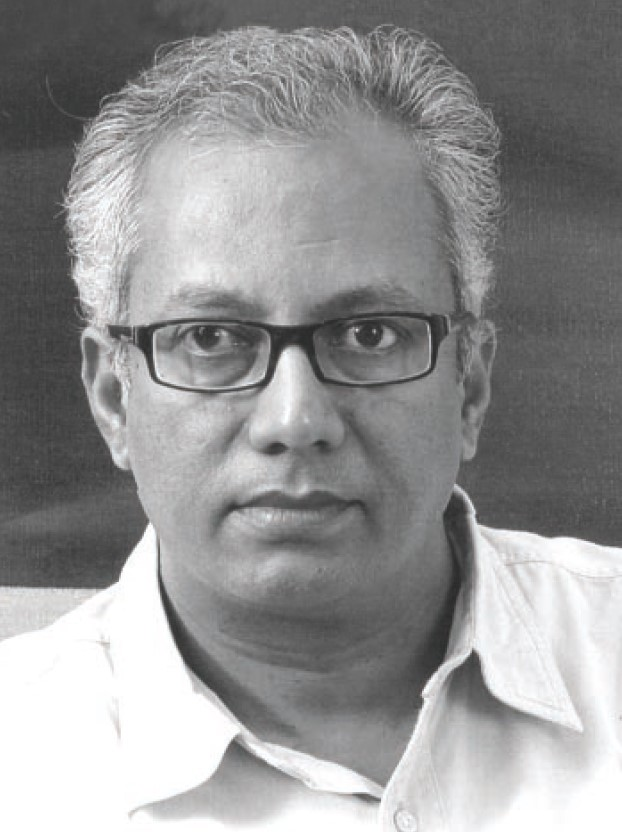
- Born: 20 January 1959 (age 67); Mumbai, Maharashtra, India
- Education: Sir J. J. School of Art; École des Beaux-Arts
- Occupation: Artist
- Spouse: Anju Dodiya
- Awards: Government of Maharashtra Gold Medal

Atul Dodiya (born 20 January 1959, in Ghatkopar, Mumbai, India) is an Indian artist.

== Education ==
Atul began exhibiting and selling his work in the early 1980s following his graduation from Sir J. J. School of Art in Mumbai where he received a Bachelor of Fine Arts degree. He furthered his academic training at the École des Beaux-Arts in Paris from 1991 to 1992 subsequent to a scholarship awarded by the French government.

== Career ==
Atul has had several solo shows in India and exhibited at 'Reflections and Images' Vadehra Art Gallery, New Delhi and Mumbai, 1993 and 'Trends and Images' CIMA, Calcutta, 1993. Outside India, he has exhibited at Gallery Lund, Amsterdam in 1993, participated in 'The Richness of the Spirit' Kuwait and Rome in 1986–89, 'India - Contemporary Art' World Trade Center, Amsterdam 1989, 'Exposition Collective' Cite Internationale Des Arts, Paris 1992.

Atul Dodiya represented as one of the artists at India Pavilion, Venice Biennale 2019, showcasing an installation titled "Broken Branches" made in 2002 inspired by the philosophy of Mahatma Gandhi. He was given the Sanskriti Award, New Delhi in 1995. One of his painting, an oil and acrylic work on canvas dedicated to former Team India captain Rahul Dravid named "The Wall" fetched Rs 57.6 lakh in auction.

Atul Dodiya is married to fellow painter Anju Dodiya and lives and works in Mumbai.

== Solo exhibitions ==
- 2010 Malevich Matters and Other Shutters, Vadehra Art Gallery, New Delhi
- 2008 Pale Ancestors, Bodhi Art, Mumbai
- 2007 Vadehra Art Gallery, New Delhi Museum Gallery, Mumbai Chemould Prescott, Mumbai
- 2006 Sumukha Gallery, Bangalore Singapore; Tyler Print Institute, Singapore; Bodhi Art, New Delhi, Mumbai, New York
- 2005 Faculty of Fine Arts, Vadodara; Bose Pacia, New York
- 2004 Faculty of Fine Arts, Vadodara
- 2003 Bose Pacia, New York
- 2002 Walsh Gallery, Chicago; Sakshi Gallery, Bombay; Reina Sofia Museum, Madrid
- 2001 The Fine Art Resource, Berlin; The Japan Foundation Asia Center, Tokyo; Gallery Chemould, Bombay
- 1999 Vadehra Art Gallery, New Delhi; Gallery Chemould, Bombay
- 1997 Cima Gallery, Calcutta
- 1989 91, 95,97, Gallery Chemould, Bombay

== Awards ==
- 2008 - Raza Award, Raza Foundation
- 1999 - Civitella Ranieri Foundation Fellowship, Italy
- 1999 - Sotheby's Prize
- 1995 - Sanskriti Award
- 1982 - Government of Maharashtra Gold Medal
