= Kiran Nadar Museum of Art =

Modern and Contemporary Art Museum in New Delhi

Kiran Nadar Museum of Art (KNMA)
- Established: 1 January 2010; 16 years ago
- Type: Modern and Contemporary Art Museum
- Founder: Kiran Nadar
- Director: Manuel Rabaté - CEO
- Curator: Roobina Karode - Artistic Director
- Website: www.knma.org

The Kiran Nadar Museum of Art (KNMA) is a private modern and contemporary art museum located in New Delhi. Established in 2010, it is India's first private museum dedicated to modern and contemporary art.

== History ==
The museum sponsored by the Shiv Nadar Foundation started out as a gallery created in the premises of HCL Technologies in Noida. They opened its doors to the public in January 2010 with an exhibition titled Open Doors. The exhibition comprises extraordinary works of well-known artist Kiran Nadar over the last two decades, signifying the relevant moment in the 20th century art.

After a year, the Kiran Nadar Museum of Art moved into South Court Mall at Saket District Centre, inaugurated with the exhibition Time unfolded where artworks of 50 artists were displayed. In 2019, David Adjaye was selected to design a new 93,124.3 m^{2} (1,002,382 sq ft) building for the Kiran Nadar Museum of Art near Indira Gandhi International Airport, containing 11 galleries for temporary exhibitions and rotating displays of the collection.

== Collection ==
The core collection holds historically important works acquired from various sources including celebrated artists, painters like Raja Ravi Varma and M. F. Husain to contemporary blue-chip artists like Anish Kapoor, as well as emerging artists. Other artists include A. Ramachandran, Arpita Singh, F. N. Souza, Jamini Roy, Jogen Chowdhury, Krishen Khanna, Manjit Bawa, N. S. Harsha, Ram Kumar, Rameshwar Broota, S. H. Raza, Subodh Gupta, Tyeb Mehta, and V. S. Gaitonde. Two of the most significant paintings acquired by Kiran Nadar which is currently a part of the museum's permanent collection is Syed Haider Raza's seminal work called Saurashtra. This fetched a record of 16.42 crore ($3,486,965) at Christie's in London in 2010. The second one was in 2015, where she bid 26.41 crore for the monumental 8 ft x 4 ft oil painting Birth (1955) by F.N Souza, a painting considered one of his best.

From July 16th to August 21st, 2026, The KNMA will present The Meeting Ground: Scenes from the KNMA Collection, an institutional exhibition presented at Christie's King Street, London, as part of Christie's summer exhibition series, extending the museum's international programme and showcasing South Asian art to a wider audience.
