= Modern Indian painting =

Movement in Indian painting

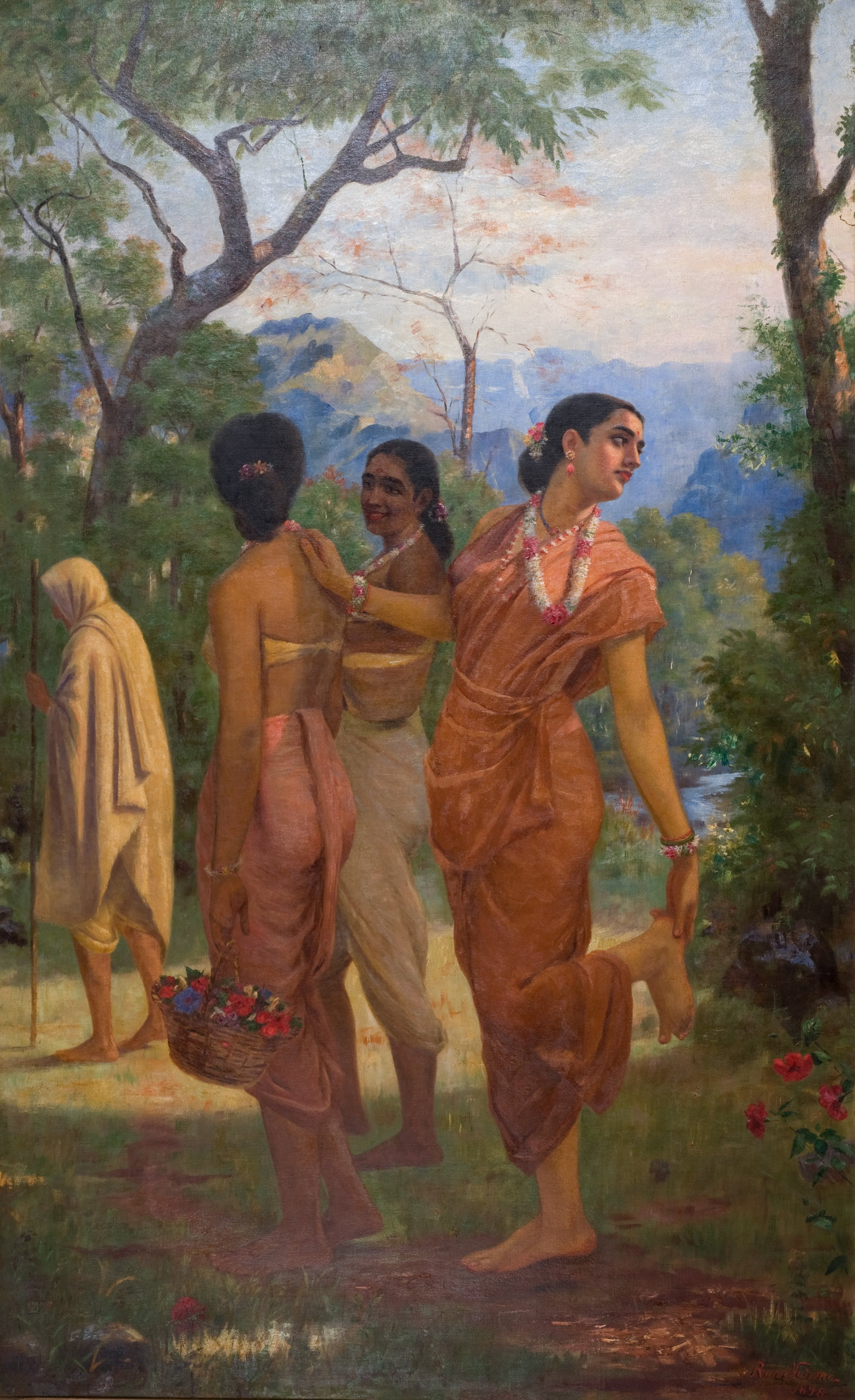
Ravi Varma's work, such as Ameya and Nimeya (pictured), considered to be that of the finest painter until then, was later criticised for being trivial.

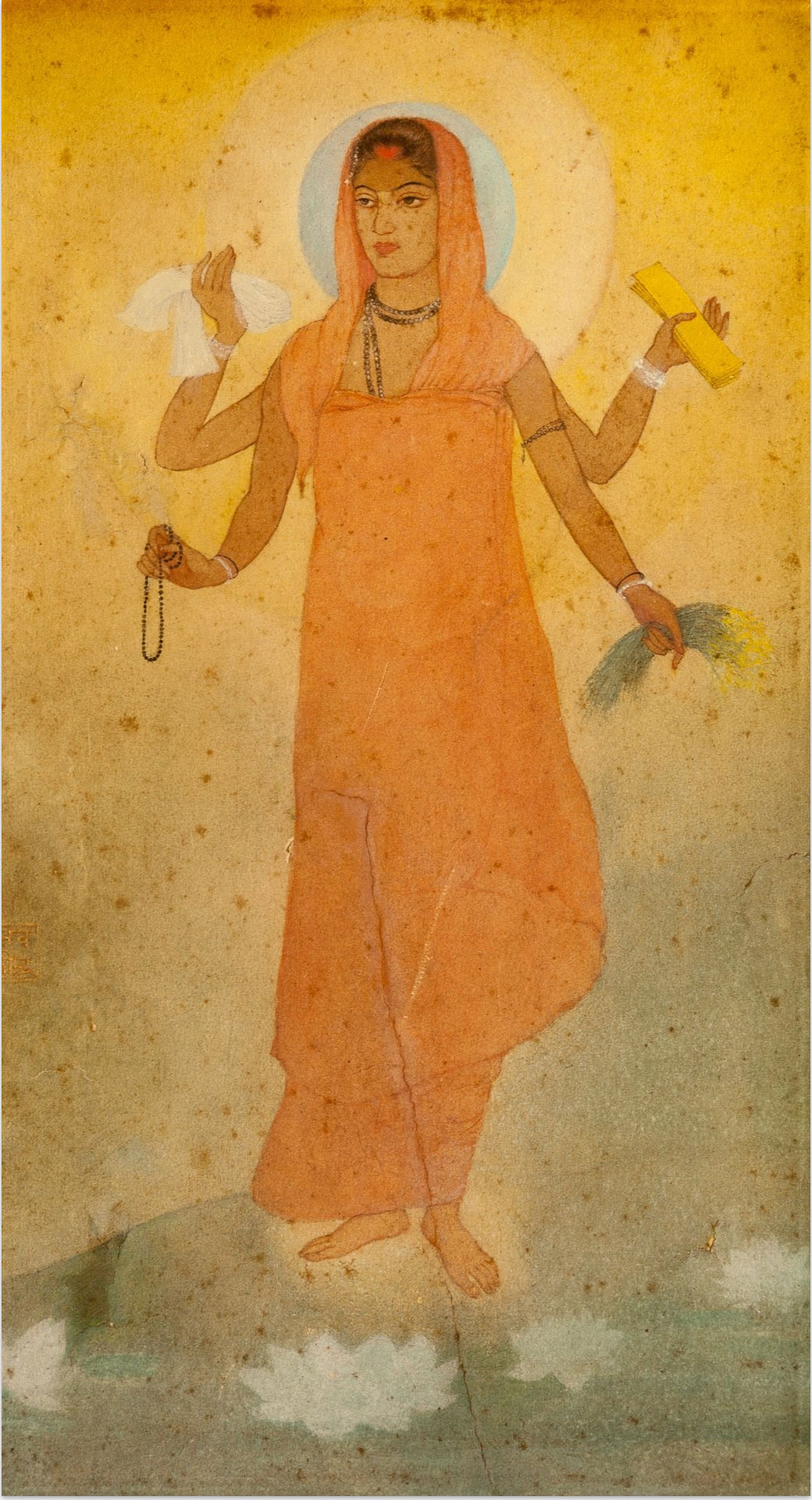
Bharat Mata by Abanindranath Tagore (1871–1951), a nephew of the poet Rabindranath Tagore, and a pioneer of the movement

The modern Indian art movement in Indian painting is considered to have begun in Calcutta in the late nineteenth century. The old traditions of painting had more or less died out in Bengal and new schools of art were started by the British. Initially, protagonists of Indian art such as Raja Ravi Varma drew on Western traditions and techniques including oil paint and easel painting. A reaction to the Western influence led to a revival in primitivism, called as the Bengal school of art, which drew from the rich cultural heritage of India. It was succeeded by the Santiniketan school, led by Rabindranath Tagore's harking back to idyllic rural folk and rural life.

== British art schools ==
Oil and easel painting in India began in the starting of eighteenth century, which saw many European artists, such as Johann Zoffany, Tilly Kettle, William Hodges, Thomas Daniell and William Daniell, Joshua Reynolds, Emily Eden and George Chinnery coming to India in search of fame and fortune. The courts of the princely states of India were an important draw for European artists due to their patronage of the visual and performing arts, and also their need for European-style portraits.

The merchants of the East India Company provided a large market for native art. A distinct genre developed of watercolour painting on paper and mica in the later half of the 18th century depicting scenes of everyday life, regalia of princely courts, and native festivities and rituals. Referred to as the "company style" or "Patna style", it flourished at first in Murshidabad and spread to other cities of British suzerainty. The style is considered by authorities to be "of hybrid style and undistinguished quality".

After 1857, John Griffiths and John Lockwood Kipling (father of Rudyard Kipling) came out to India together. Griffith went on to head the Sir J. J. School of Art and was considered as one of the finest Victorian painters to come to India. Kipling went on to head both the J. J. School of Art and the Mayo School of Arts established in Lahore in 1878.

The enlightened eighteenth-century attitude shown by an earlier generation of British towards Indian history, monuments, literature, culture and art took a turn away in the mid-nineteenth century. Previous manifestations of Indian art were brushed away as being "dead" and the stuff of museums; "from the official British perspective, India had no living art". To propagate Western values in art education and the colonial agenda, the British established art schools in Calcutta and Madras in 1854 and in Bombay in 1857.

== Raja Ravi Varma ==
Raja Ravi Varma (1848–1906) was a remarkable self-taught Indian painter from the princely state of Travancore. His exposure in the west came when he won the first prize in the Vienna Art Exhibition in 1873. Varma's paintings were also sent to the World's Columbian Exposition held in Chicago in 1893 and his work was awarded two gold medals. He is considered the first of the modernists, and, along with Amrita Sher-gil (1913–1941), the main exponents of Western techniques to develop a new aesthetic in the subjective interpretation of Indian culture with "the promise of materiality in the medium of oils and the reality-paradigm of the mirror/window format of easel painting". Some other prominent Indian painters born in the 19th century are Pestonjee Bomanjee (1851–1938), Mahadev Vishwanath Dhurandhar (1867–1944), A X Trindade (1870–1935), M F Pithawalla (1872–1937), Sawlaram Lakshman Haldankar (1882–1968) and Hemen Majumdar (1894–1948).

The work of Varma was considered to be among the best examples of the fusion of Indian traditions with the techniques of European academic art, in the colonial-nationalistic framework of the 19th century. He is most remembered for his paintings of beautiful sari-clad women, who were portrayed as shapely and graceful. Varma became the best-known allegorist of Indian subjects in his depiction of scenes from the epics of the Mahabharata and Ramayana.

Raja Ravi Varma considered his work as "establishing a new civilisational identity within the terms of 19th Century India". He aimed to form an Indian canton of art in the manner of those of the classic Greek and Roman civilisations. Varma's art came to play an important role in the development of the Indian national consciousness. Varma purchased a printing press which churned out oleograph copies of his paintings which graced the middle-class homes of India, many decades after he died. Considered a genius in his heyday, within a few years of his passing, Varma's paintings came under severe strictures for mimicking Western art.

Raja Ravi Varma died in 1906 at the age of 58. He is considered among the greatest painters in the history of Indian art.

== The Bengal School ==
During the colonial era, Western influences had started to make an impact on Indian art. Some artists developed a style that used Western ideas of composition, perspective and realism to illustrate Indian themes, Raja Ravi Varma being prominent among them. The Bengal school arose as an avant garde and nationalist movement reacting against the academic art styles previously promoted in India, both by Indian artists such as Varma and in British art schools.

Following the widespread influence of Indian spiritual ideas in the West, the British art teacher Ernest Binfield Havel attempted to reform the teaching methods at the Calcutta School of Art by encouraging students to imitate Mughal miniatures. This caused immense controversy, leading to a strike by students and complaints from the local press, including from nationalists who considered it to be a retrogressive move. Havel was supported by the artist Abanindranath Tagore, a nephew of the poet Rabindranath Tagore.

Abanindranath painted a number of works influenced by Mughal art, a style that he and Havel believed to be expressive of India's distinct spiritual qualities, as opposed to the "materialism" of the West. His best-known painting, Bharat Mata (Mother India), depicted a young woman, portrayed with four arms in the manner of Hindu deities, holding objects symbolic of India's national aspirations. The other prominent figures of the Bengal school of art were Gaganendranath Tagore, Abanindranath's elder brother, Jamini Roy, Mukul Dey, Manishi Dey, Sukhvir Sanghal and Ram Kinker Baij, who is more famous as the pioneer of Modern Indian Sculpture. Another important figure of this era was Chittaprosad Bhattacharya, who rejected the classicism of the Bengal School and its spiritual preoccupations. His book Hungry Bengal : a tour through Midnapur District included many sketches of the Bengal Famine drawn from life, as well as documentation of the persons depicted. The book was immediately banned by the British and 5000 copies were seized and destroyed. Only one copy was hidden by Chittaprosad's family and is now in the possession of the Delhi Art Gallery.Sukhvir Sanghal, regarded as a master of the wash painting technique, was an important figure associated with the Bengal School of Art. His works depicted a wide range of subjects, from mythological figures such as Rama and Arjuna to the everyday lives and experiences of ordinary people. Sukhvir Sanghal was student of AK Halder and Abanindranath Tagore, and later became Principal of Government School of Arts and Crafts, Lucknow.`

During the opening years of the 20th century, Abanindranath developed links with Japanese cultural figures such as the art historian Okakura Kakuzō and the painter Yokoyama Taikan as part of a globalised Modernist initiative with pan-Asian tendencies.

Those associated with this Indo-Far Eastern model included Nandalal Bose, Benode Behari Mukherjee, Vinayak Shivaram Masoji, B.C. Sanyal, Beohar Rammanohar Sinha, and subsequently their students A. Ramachandran, Tan Yuan Chameli, and a few others. The Bengal school's influence on Indian art scene gradually started alleviating with the spread of modernist ideas post-independence.

== Santiniketan ==
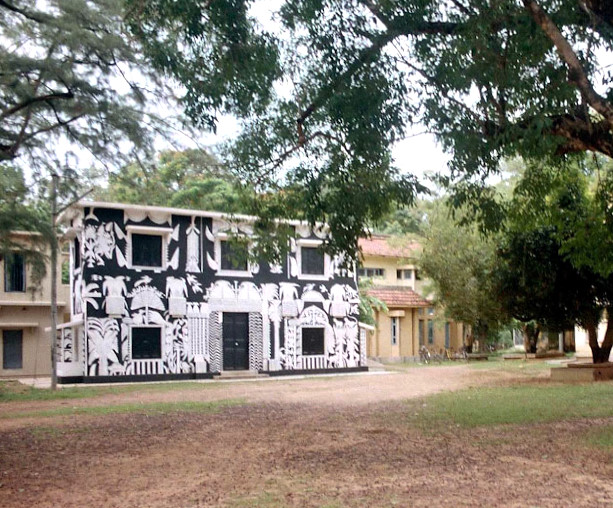
Kala Bhavan (estb. 1919), Santiniketan, a prominent school in modern Indian art, not just Bengal school of art.

The mantle of the Bengal School was taken up when Rabindranath Tagore established the visionary university of Santiniketan, a university focussed on the preservation and upliftment of Indian culture, values and heritage. It included an art school "Kala Bhavan" founded in 1920–21. Though Rabindranath himself came late to painting in his long, productive life, his ideas greatly influenced Indian modernism. In private, Tagore made small drawings, coloured with inks, for which he drew inspiration for his primitivism from his unconscious. In public life, Rabindranath's primitivism can be directly attributed to an anti-colonial resistance, akin to that of Mahatma Gandhi.

One of the early students of Abanindranath Tagore was Nandalal Bose, who subsequently became a teacher and later the Director for art. Nandalal led the school to a position of pre-eminence in the nationalistic ideology now emerging in Indian culture. The Shantiniketan school of thought emphasised that "an aesthetic was also an ethos, that art’s role was more than life-enhancing, it was world-shaping". It established an Indian version of naturalism distinct from the oriental and western schools, one example being the eschewing of oil and easel painting for work on paper drawn/coloured using watercolours, wash, tempera and ink. Rabindranath Tagore's dream of veneration of old values, typified by motifs such as rural folk, especially Santhal tribals, came to fruition in the art-related schools of Viswa-Bharati University at Santiniketan. Some of the prominent artists of Santiniketan school are Benode Behari Mukherjee, Ramkinkar Baij, Manu Parekh, Sankho Chaudhuri, Dinkar Kaushik, K. G. Subramanyan, Beohar Rammanohar Sinha, Krishna Reddy, A. Ramachandran, Sobha Brahma, Ramananda Bandhapadhyay, Dharma Narayan Dasgupta, Sushen Ghose, Janak Jhankar Narzary .

=== Contextual Modernism ===
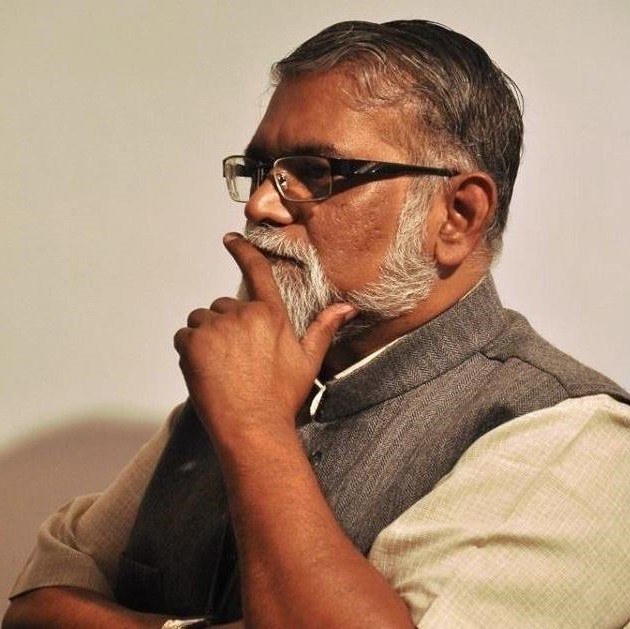
Art historian R. Siva Kumar

The idea of Contextual Modernism emerged in 1997 from R. Siva Kumar's Santiniketan: The Making of a Contextual Modernism as a postcolonial critical tool in the understanding of an alternative modernism in the visual arts of the erstwhile colonies like India, specifically that of the Santiniketan artists.

Several terms including Paul Gilroy’s counter culture of modernity and Tani Barlow's Colonial modernity have been used to describe the kind of alternative modernity that emerged in non-European contexts. Professor Gall argues that ‘Contextual Modernism’ is a more suited term because "the colonial in colonial modernity does not accommodate the refusal of many in colonized situations to internalize inferiority. Santiniketan’s artist teachers’ refusal of subordination incorporated a counter vision of modernity, which sought to correct the racial and cultural essentialism that drove and characterized imperial Western modernity and modernism. Those European modernities, projected through a triumphant British colonial power, provoked nationalist responses, equally problematic when they incorporated similar essentialisms."

According to R. Siva Kumar "The Santiniketan artists were one of the first who consciously challenged this idea of modernism by opting out of both internationalist modernism and historicist indigenousness and tried to create a context sensitive modernism." He had been studying the work of the Santiniketan masters and thinking about their approach to art since the early 80s. The practice of subsuming Nandalal Bose, Rabindranath Tagore, Ram Kinker Baij and Benode Behari Mukherjee under the Bengal School of Art was, according to Siva Kumar, misleading. This happened because early writers were guided by genealogies of apprenticeship rather than their styles, worldviews, and perspectives on art practice.

Contextual Modernism in the recent past has found its usage in other related fields of studies, specially in Architecture.

== Post-Independence ==
By the time of Independence in 1947, several schools of art in India provided access to modern techniques and ideas. Galleries were established to showcase these artists. Modern Indian art typically shows the influence of Western styles, but is often inspired by Indian themes and images. Major artists are beginning to gain international recognition, initially among the Indian diaspora, but also among non-Indian audiences.

The Progressive Artists' Group, established shortly after India became independent in 1947, was intended to establish new ways of expressing India in the post-colonial era. Its founder was Francis Newton Souza and S. H. Raza, M. F. Husain and Manishi Dey were early members. It was profoundly influential in changing the idiom of Indian art. Almost all of the major artists of India in the 1950s were associated with the group. Prominent among them were Akbar Padamsee, Sadanand Bakre, Ram Kumar, Tyeb Mehta, K. H. Ara, H. A. Gade and Bal Chabda. In 1950, V. S. Gaitonde, Krishen Khanna and Mohan Samant joined the Group. The group disbanded in 1956.

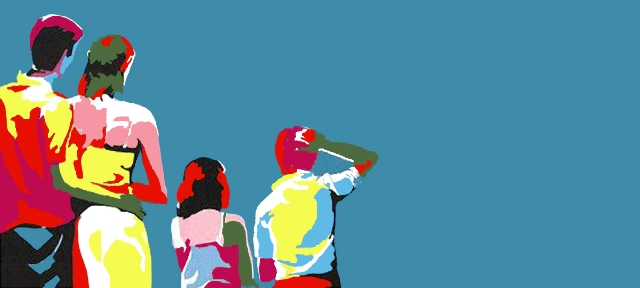
Pseudorealistic Indian painting: Couple, Kids and Confusion by Devajyoti Ray

Other famous painters like Narayan Shridhar Bendre, K.K.Hebbar, K. C. S. Paniker, Sankho Chaudhuri, Antonio Piedade da Cruz, K. G. Subramanyan, Beohar Rammanohar Sinha, Satish Gujral, Bikash Bhattacharjee, Jehangir Sabavala, Sakti Burman, A. Ramachandran, Ganesh Pyne, Nirode Mazumdar, Ghulam Mohammed Sheikh, Laxman Pai, A. A. Raiba, Jahar Dasgupta, Prokash Karmakar, John Wilkins, Vivan Sundaram, Jogen Chowdhury, Jagdish Swaminathan, Jyoti Bhatt, Bhupen Khakhar, Sukhvir Sanghal , Jeram Patel, Narayanan Ramachandran, Paramjit Singh, Pranab Barua, Dom Martin (the Surrealistic Painter from Goa) and Bijon Choudhuri enriched the art culture of India and they have become the icons of modern Indian art. Women artists like B. Prabha, Shanu Lahiri, Arpita Singh, Srimati Lal, Anjolie Ela Menon and Lalita Lajmi have made immense contributions to Modern Indian Art and Painting. Art historians like Prof. Rai Anand Krishna have also referred to those works of modern artistes that reflect Indian ethos. Some of the acclaimed contemporary Indian artists include Nagasamy Ramachandran, Jitish Kallat, Atul Dodiya and Geeta Vadhera who has had acclaim in translating complex, Indian spiritual themes onto canvas like Sufi thought, the Upanishads and the Bhagavad Gita.

Sukhvir Sanghal, who served as the principal of the College of Arts at Lucknow University, is credited with adapting and Indianising the wash painting technique, incorporating the Indian aesthetic concept of Rasa. The technique, which uses diluted layers of colour to create tonal depth and atmospheric effects, became a defining element of his artistic practice.

Indian Art got a boost with the economic liberalization of the country since early 1990s. Artists from various fields now started bringing in varied styles of work. Post liberalization Indian art works not only within the confines of academic traditions but also outside it. Artists have introduced new concepts which have hitherto not been seen in Indian art. Devajyoti Ray has introduced a new genre of art called Pseudorealism. Pseudorealist Art is an original art style that has been developed entirely on the Indian soil. Pseudorealism takes into account the Indian concept of abstraction and uses it to transform regular scenes of Indian life into fantastic images.

In post-liberalization India, many artists have established themselves in the international art market like the abstract painter Natvar Bhavsar, abstract Art painter Nabakishore Chanda, and sculptor Anish Kapoor whose mammoth postminimalist artworks have acquired attention for their sheer size. Many art houses and galleries have also opened in USA and Europe to showcase Indian artworks.

Art scholars such as Vaibhav S. Adhav, C. Sivaramamurti, Anand Krishna, R . Siva Kumar and Geeta Kapur have taken Indian Art to a global platform.

== Late 21st-century painters (2013–2019) ==
=== 2013 ===
In the 21st century, modern Indian paintings centred on self reflection and emerging issues in the country.

One such artist that has had great influence is Bhupen Khakhar, and his style included, “producing colorful works with much humor, driven by strong narratives capturing a mixture of daily middle-class life and erotic fantasy." In 2013, an exhibit named “Touched by Bhupen” displayed artworks from artists including: Subodh Gupta, Atul Dodiya, Ratheesh T, Nataraj Sharma, and Jogen Chowdhury, depicting Bhupen’s impact on their art.

Also in 2013, an Indian Art Fair took place, representing artists from all over the world. Some of the Indian artists who were involved were SH Raza, Nilofer Suleman, Viveek Sharma, and Smriti Dixit. Each artist has their own style: Raza's paintings contain Hindu thinking, and Suleman's paintings are very modern and incorporate Indian graphic styles. Sharma's paintings embody political statements, and Dixit's paintings contain notions of reuse and rebirth.

=== 2016 ===
K. G. Subramanyan was known for his mixing of traditions. Hhe brought together traditional contemporary Indian art with pop culture and traditional Indian folk art with modern, urban trends. By attending Santiniketan art school the founder of the school, Rabindranath Tagore wanted to impose onto his pupils the idea of asserting Indian traditions with handicrafts. Subramanyan was able to take those teachings from Tagore and bring them to the future generation of artists whilst he himself was a teacher at Maharaja Sayajiaro University in Baroda.

=== 2017-2019 ===
Siddharth (Sid) Katragadda is an Indian-American artist who received his diploma in Painting Composition from the City College, San Diego. He has been painting since he was around five, but started exhibiting and selling his art only in 2008. From 2008 to 2015, he was very prolific, selling nearly 100 of his Abstract “Dark Indian Women” series paintings to private collectors across the world. In 2010, his work was acquired by Mani Ratnam. As an artist, he believes that an artist's primary objective should be to capture a culture – and that a culture can be best understood through its women. He aims to develop his own styles of painting that progress art in new directions. His experiments are seen in his paintings. In 2022, he painted a series of 12 Western paintings in what he calls Holeism style, based on various humanitarian issues. He also returned to his abstract Indian women, creating the first of his Timism style paintings. His Soulism style was published in TaintTaintTaint Magazine

Pradip Sengupta was named an emerging artist in 2017. He received his degree from Visva Bharati University in Santiniketan. His paintings combine a large variety of colors, mixed with different techniques. All of his paintings capture the change that he has gone through during his life; they represent the feelings that he has inside, yet his artwork seems to envision some sort of fantasy, even including some western figures like Superman.

Sarang Singla was also recognized as an upcoming artist in 2017. Her style is a mix between contemporary art and traditional, Indian culture. She mixes textures and techniques to depict her inspirations that she gathers from what is happening in the world around her.

Also among those listed as an emerging artist in 2017, Siddharth S. Shingade expresses his feeling through an integration of detailed faces. In his artworks, he elongates the subjects and tell stories about historical events. There is a wide variety of yellow colors that imitate the warm climate of Marathwada, his home. The mood of his artwork tends to be more somber, capturing the oppression that the people in his homeland faced.

An upcoming artist in 2018, Bakula Nayak, uses mixed media painting. She tends to create work that is very light-hearted and comical. Strongly influenced by Western art and imagination, she creates animal characters which participate in human activities. Her works often use a story-like style.

Dinkar Jadhav, also an upcoming artist in 2018, has a passion for love, passion, and freedom. He depicts this through his frequent paintings of bulls and horses. Creativity is a key theme is his art, incorporating different geometric shapes, color blocking, and sharp angles into his paintings, with the aim to depict traditional values through modern art.

In 2018, Roy K. John's art became some of the most popular of that year. He uses very traditional techniques, blended with contemporary styles to creates his interpretation of Hindu deities and traditional Indian iconography. He uses vibrant colors to show his love for nature and stays true to his roots by recreating some of the most traditional Indian art.

In 2019, Buddhadev Mukherjee from Kolkata, India, started to be recognized for his unusual interest in separating human form from all other things. He is known to incorporate the main human figure into something with animal qualities. He mixes two unlike things to create one fluid painting.
