= Abalal Rahiman =

Indian painter (1860–1931)

Abalal Rahiman (1860 – 28 December 1931) was a celebrated painter of Kolhapur (Maharashtra). He was the first art-school trained artist of the region. After 1888, he served as the court painter of the Kolhapur State, and remained under the patronage of Chhatrapati Shahu Maharaj till the latter's death. During the time he was active as a painter (starting 1890), Rahiman created over 20,000 paintings, and is known for his realist-style portraits and landscapes executed in watercolour.

== Early life and career ==
Rahiman was born into a family skilled in illumination of Quranic manuscripts. He received a scholarship to study at the Sir J.J School of Art in Bombay from the Maharaja of Kolhapur upon the recommendation of the local British Resident.

At the J.J School of Art, he trained under John Griffiths. He was a promising student, and his teachers expected his art-career to grow in the direction of Pestonji Bomanji. In 1888, Rahiman was also awarded the inaugural Viceroy's Gold Medal.

A personal setback (his mother's death, followed by tensions with his step-mother) forced him to live a secluded life on the outskirts of Kolhapur. Occasionally, he participated in shows by the Bombay Art Society.

During his lifetime, Rahiman did not receive much patronage outside of the Kolhapur Court and did not have a steady income. After the death of his patron (Shahu Maharaj) in 1922, Rahiman's income stream declined further, leading him to live in poverty. Unable to afford large canvases, he resorted to painting on scrap papers and produced miniatures; the financial strain and depression in the aftermath of his patron's death caused him to destroy many of his works.

Abalal Rahiman's works remain part of many important collections including the Kolhapur Palace collection, National Gallery of Modern Art, Chhatrapati Shivaji Maharaj Vastu Sangrahalaya, DAG, Zapurza Museum of Art and Culture and also in private collections.

== Influence and legacy ==
Abalal Rahiman was a mentor to prominent artists like Baburao Painter and S.Fatelal, founder of the Prabhat Film Company and his career inspired the work of painters such as M.K Parandekar and M.V Dhurandhar. Rahiman's work has been considered instrumental in establishing the 'Kolhapur School of European Naturalism'.
