= Richard Bartholomew =

Indian artist and writer (1926 – 1985)

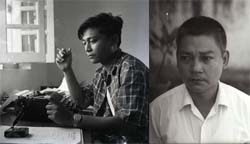
- Born: Ko Thein Pe; 29 November 1926; Tavoy, Burma, British India
- Died: 11 January 1985 (aged 58); New Delhi, India
- Citizenship: India
- Occupation: Art critic
- Spouse: Rati Batra
- Children: Pablo; Robin
- Website: www.bartholomew.tv

Richard Lawrence Bartholomew (29 November 1926 – 11 January 1985) was an Indian art critic, photographer, painter, poet, and writer.

== Early life ==
Richard Bartholomew fled from Tavoy (Dawei), Burma (Myanmar), where he was born, during the Second World War. To escape the Japanese capture of Burma and the imminent persecution on account of their Christian names, Bartholomew fled with his family, walking the General Stilwell Road from Mandalay to Ledo in upper Assam, India. His schooling at St. Paul's School in Rangoon (Yangon) was interrupted because of the Japanese invasion and Bartholomew finished high school at Delhi's Cambridge School. He received his bachelor's and master's degree from St. Stephen's College, Delhi in 1950. While at St. Stephens, he met Rati Batra, his future wife, who was herself a refugee from Pakistan who came to India during the Partition in 1947. Bartholomew lived in India as a stateless citizen until 1967 when he gained Indian citizenship, thereby closing all possibilities of returning to Burma which had become a dictatorship from the early–1960s.

== Photographer, painter, poet ==
Bartholomew pursued a career not only as an art critic but also as a writer, poet, painter, and curator. Solo shows of his work were held in Delhi and Bombay in the 1950s. Between then and the 1970s, he documented life around him through photography. Though he rarely exhibited his photographic work during his lifetime, his pictures intimately portrayed his family and his circle of artist friends and associates and his travels in India and the US.

== Art critic and writer ==
Bartholomew was a pioneering art critic in that he was one of the first to initiate dialogues with painters. He fostered a sense of community within the artists and communicated their ideals to the public who were not entirely receptive or convinced of the daring, artistic exploration of India's Progressive Art Movement.

Through numerous reviews published from the early–1950s until the late–1970s in publications like The Indian Express, The Times of India, and Thought, Bartholomew documented the artistic trajectories of painters such as Francis Newton Souza, Tyeb Mehta, Manishi Dey, Biren De, Ram Kumar, Krishen Khanna, Akbar Padamsee, SH Raza, Sailoz Mookherjea, Bhupen Khakkar, Satish Gujral; sculptors like Ramkinkar Baij, Dhanraj Bhagat, Chintamoni Kar, Somnath Hore, Sankho Chaudhuri; graphic artists including Kanwal Krishna, Devayani Krishna, Krishna Reddy, Jagmohan Chopra, Jyoti Bhatt as well as renowned photographers Raghu Rai and TS Satyan.

Besides a series of articles on Indian and Tibetan art, Bartholomew also co-authored, Husain, a monograph on M.F. Husain which was published by Harry Abrams, New York in 1972. In 1974, he published a monograph on Krishna Reddy. He also wrote poems and short stories which were published in magazines including Thought and Illustrated Weekly.

== Gallerist and curator ==
Bartholomew was the Gallery Director of Kunika-Chemould, New Delhi's first contemporary art gallery. Subsequently, from 1966–1973, he worked with the Tibet House, New Delhi as their curator and development officer where he catalogued the Dalai Lama's collection of religious artefacts and travelled with them to the US and Japan. He was also the recipient of the Asian Cultural Council's John D. Rockefeller 3rd Award in 1970. He was appointed Commissioner of the Silver Jubilee of Indian Independence exhibition held in Washington DC in 1973 and travelled to UK in 1982 as a British Council Visitor and as Commissioner of the Festival of India Exhibition held in Britain in 1982, during which he co-curated the exhibition Contemporary Indian Art at the Royal Academy of Arts with Geeta Kapur and Akbar Padamsee. Bartholomew served as the Secretary of the Lalit Kala Akademi from 1977 to 1985.

Barely 58, Bartholomew died in 1985. He is survived by his wife Rati Bartholomew and his two sons Pablo and Robin.

== Works ==
=== Art criticism ===
- R. Bartholomew and S. Kapur: Husain. Harry N Abrams, New York, 1971, co-authored by Shiv Kapur
- Krishna Reddy Krishna Reddy. Contemporary Indian Art Series, Lalit Kala Akademi, India, 1974
- R. Bartholomew and P. Bartholomew: Richard Bartholomew - The Art Critic. An insider's account of the birth of Modern Indian Art. issuu Publishing, 2014.

=== Poetry ===
- The Story of Siddhartha's Release. (Writers Workshop, India, 1972)
- Poems. (Writers Workshop, India, 1973)
- The Cycle (sonnets). (Writers Workshop, 1986)

=== Photography ===
- A Critic's Eye. (PHOTOINK, New Delhi, Chatterjee & Lal, Mumbai & Sepia International, New York, 2009)
