= Beohar Rammanohar Sinha =

Indian painter (1929–2007)

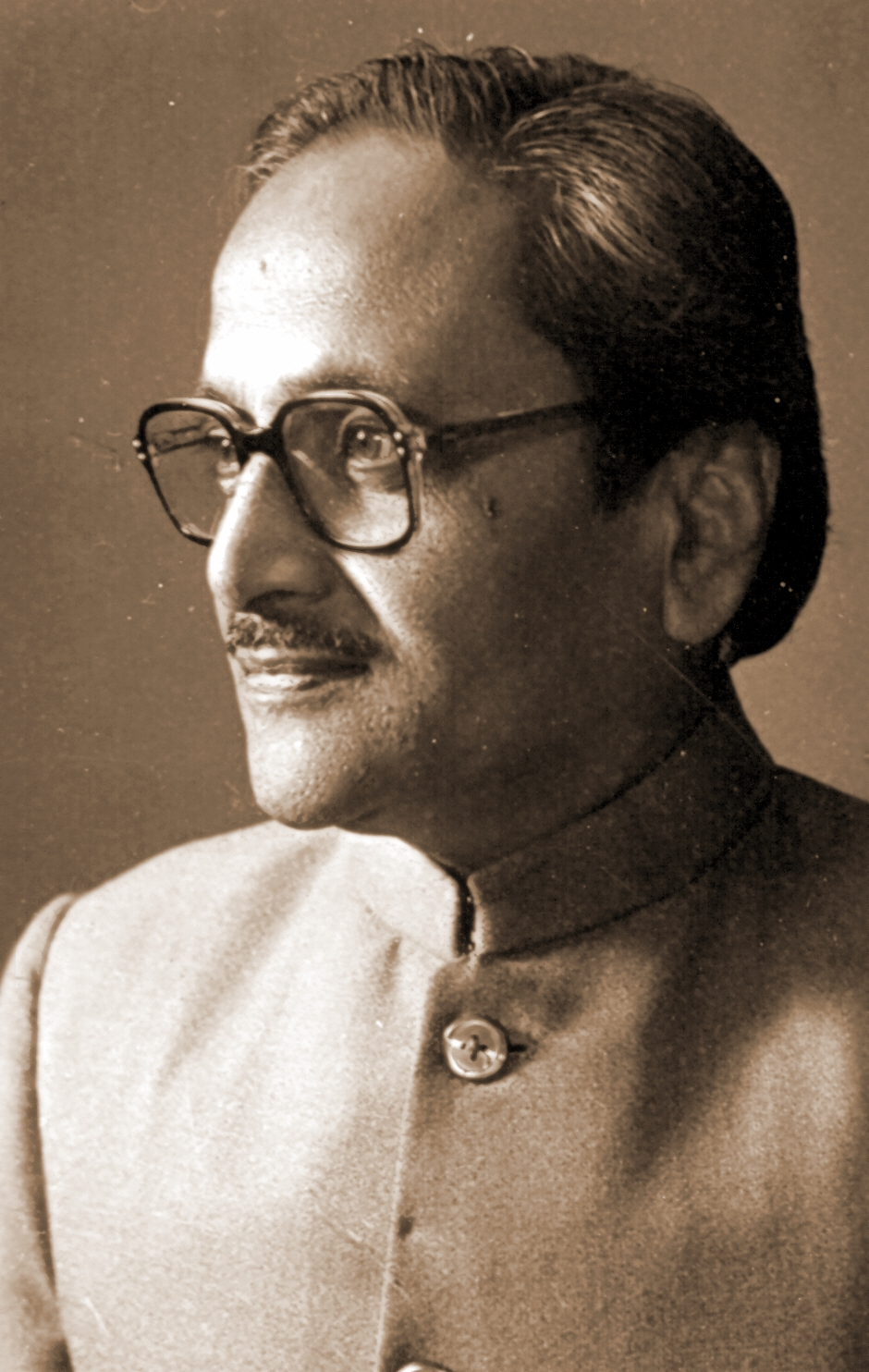
- Born: 15 June 1929; Jabalpur, Central Provinces, British India
- Died: 25 October 2007 (aged 78); Indore, Madhya Pradesh, India
- Education: Shantiniketan
- Known for: Painting (Revivalism, Contextual Modernism, Minimalism)
- Notable work: Constitution of India

Beohar Rammanohar Sinha (15 June 1929 – 25 October 2007) was an Indian artist who is very well known for illuminating the original final manuscript of Constitution of India, including the complete Preamble-page, which was brought to fruition in 1949 as one of the most beautiful Constitutions in the world in addition to being the most comprehensive one. He is also known as a cultural ambassador of India who disseminated Indian art in the Far East, and brought Oriental Art to India. His works are housed in numerous prestigious public and private collections throughout the world and his murals still adorn the walls and gigantic dome of Jabalpur's historic Shaheed-Smarak or Martyrs'-Memorial Auditorium even after more than half a century, though now demanding conservation. By way of a registered Will, he bequeathed his entire creative legacy and collection of works of art to his son Dr Anupam Sinha who has since relocated from Canada to India.

Rammanohar always signed his artworks in the cursive Devanagari-script, either in short Ram or in full Rammanohar, but rarely scribed his surname. Most of his later paintings bear a unique red seal with his surname Sinha, primarily in Devanagari-script but also sometimes in the Pinyin-script, in addition to his said signatures in ink.

== Childhood ==
Rammanohar was born on 15 June 1929 in a Kayastha family in the then Jubbulpore, the largest and most important city of British India's Central Provinces. He was the youngest of the three sons of renowned Gandhian Beohar Rajendra Sinha - an acclaimed scholar, historian, theologian, littérateur, Hindi-activist, Ramayana-authority and, to a lesser extent, a journalist and a politician - who happily embraced numerous terms as political-prisoner while leading the Indian independence movement as a part of Satyagrah.

During Rammanohar's childhood, their residence BeoharNiwas-Palace in Jubbulpore's Satya-Kua locality used to be abuzz with nationalistic activities and was frequented by Mahatma Gandhi, Rajendra Prasad, Vallabhbhai Patel, Maithili Sharan Gupt, Jawaharlal Nehru, Kaka Kalelkar, Makhanlal Chaturvedi, Khan Abdul Ghaffar Khan, Vinoba Bhave, some of whom would stay for days. The seeds of nationalism, philanthropy and simplicity consequently got imbibed in him.

== Foundations ==
As a part of his schooling in the then Jubbulpore, Rammanohar initially attended Anglican Christ Church Boys Senior Secondary School for a short while, but did not find the convent milieu conducive to his temperament and his family's nationalistic ideologies. He, therefore, switched very soon to the nationalist Pt Lajja Shankar Jha Model School Jabalpur and also spent some time studying in the Hitkarini Sabha School.

On various Hindu festivals, Rammanohar used to assist his mother, RajRani Devi, in drawing a wide variety of folkloristic motifs for her Pujas. To her teenager son, in addition to allowing an extra share in the sumptuous prasad, she also used to recite captivating narratives and melodious hymns that often incorporated conventional explanations as well as diverse interpretations of those motifs. This laid his foundations in visual arts.

Even after the death of Rabindranath Tagore in 1941, Rammanohar's father Beohar Rajendra Simha continued visiting Shantiniketan to meet his friends Banarsidas Chaturvedi, Hazari Prasad Dwivedi, Kshitimohan Sen and others. On one such visit in 1946, Rammanohar accompanied him, but decided to stay back, sharing K. G. Subramanyan's room in the hostel.

Rammanohar carried out his graduation in fine arts in Kala Bhavana at the nationalist Visva-Bharati University, Shantiniketan, from 1946 to 1950. He was the favorite disciple of one of the pioneers of modern Indian art and a key figure of contextual modernism, Nandalal Bose. In unison, he was also trained and mentored by Ramkinkar Baij and Benode Behari Mukherjee. As a part of his postgraduation during 1951 to 1953, along with gaining expertise in Fresco-secco under Nandalal Bose, he chose to specialize in Zen painting under Yu Wan-shan who founded the Huafan University in Taiwan – the only institution outside India that uses Lion Capital of Ashoka as its logo. This was Rammanohar's first brush with the Oriental art with which he stayed despite the opportunity of relocating to Slade School of Fine Art in London on his senior Krishna Reddy's behest.

== Nationalistic early artwork ==
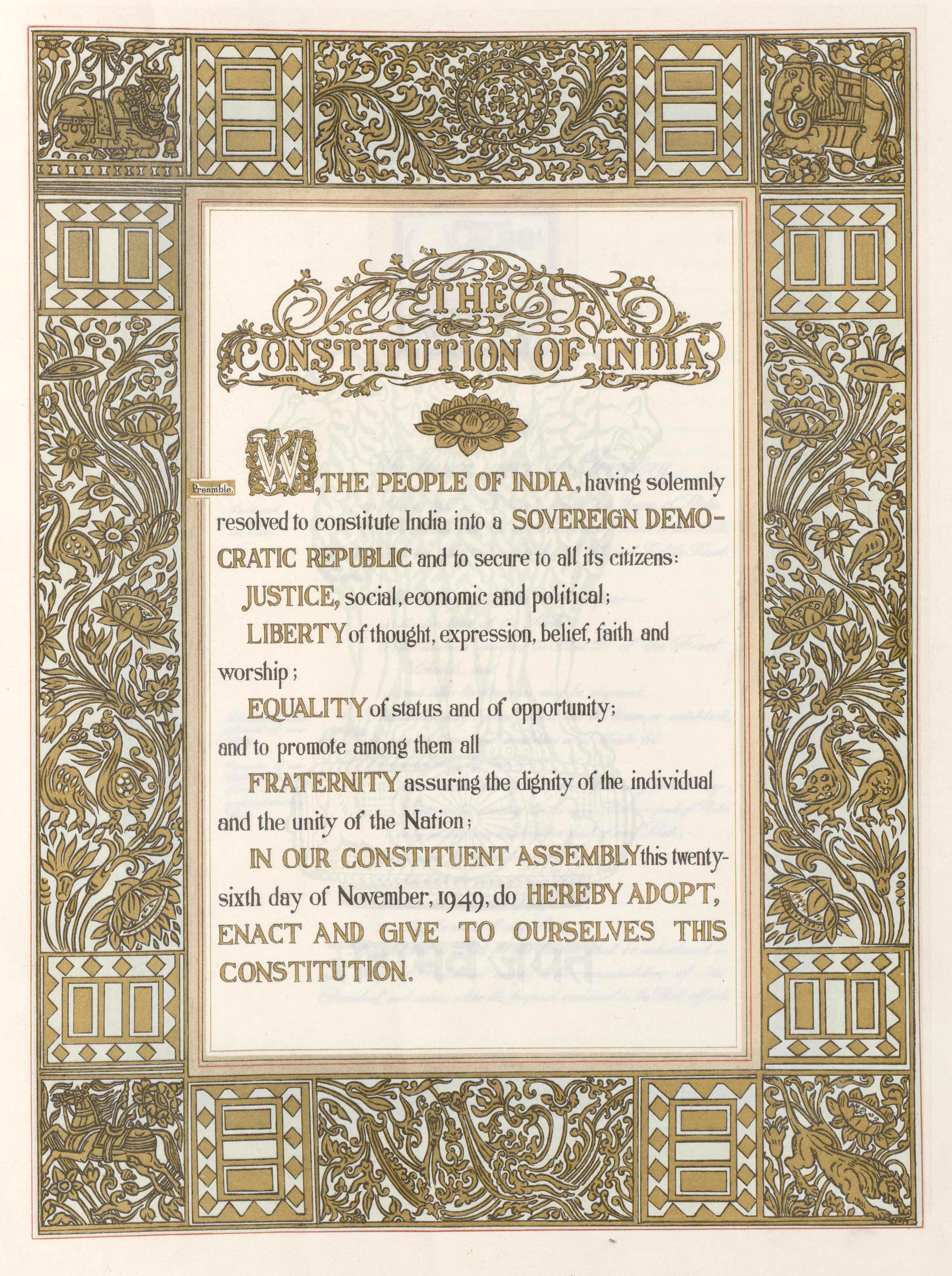
Indian Constitution's Preamble, illustrated-calligraphed by Rammanohar

Rammanohar's most famous works include the illustrations on the pages of the original calligraphic manuscript of Constitution of India, including the complete Preamble-page, which were endorsed in 1949 by Nandalal Bose without any alteration whatsoever.

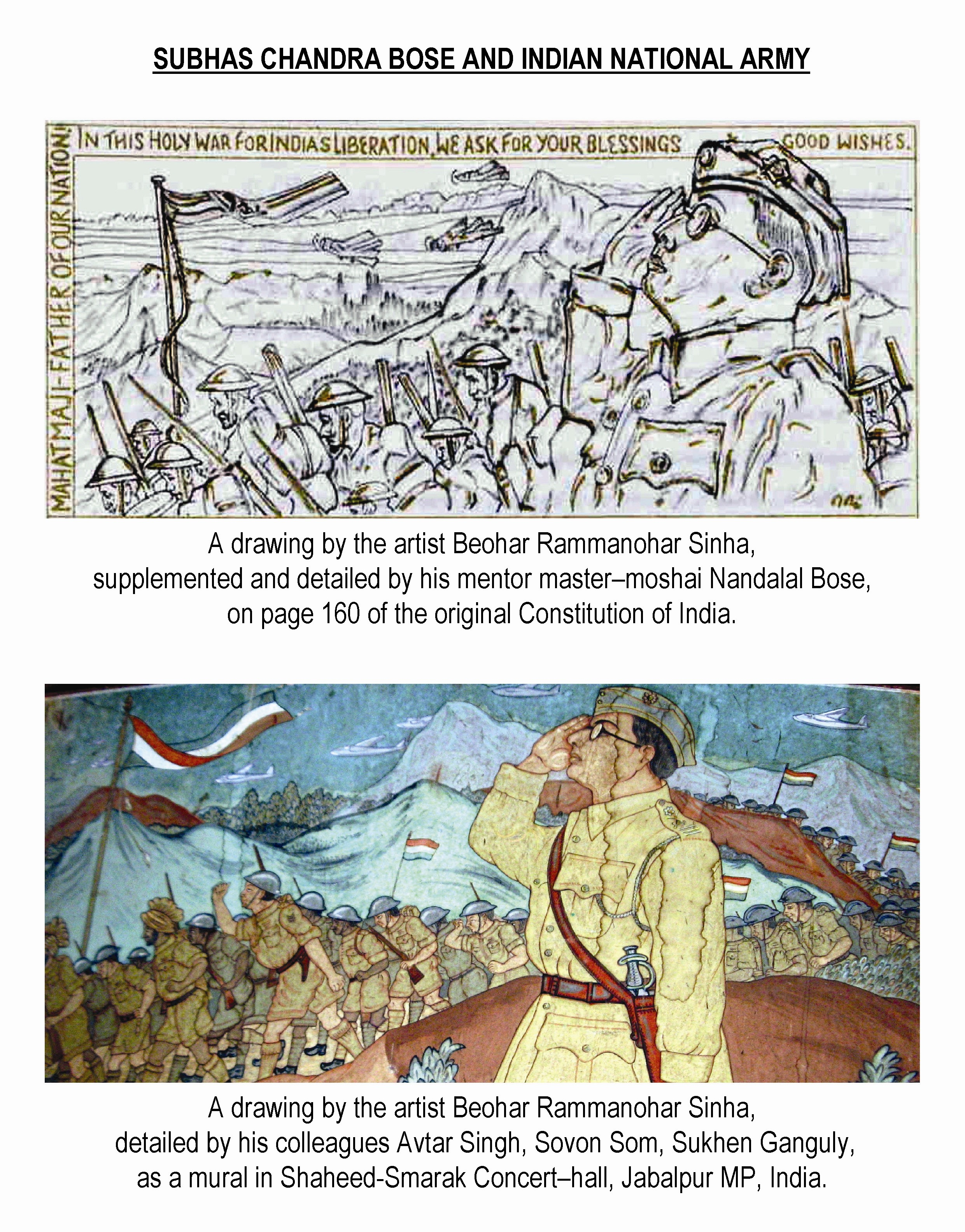
Subhas Chandra Bose leading the Azad Hind Fauj (Indian National Army)

Rammanohar took the Herculean-challenge and made exploratory trips to such places as Ajanta, Ellora, Bagh, Badami, Sanchi, Sarnath and Mahabalipuram. He used such summary motifs as Padm, Nandi, Airavata, Vyaghra, Ashwa, Hans and Mayur to convey essence of Indian Constitution pictorially.

Rammanohar initially refused to subscribe his signatures on his artworks in Indian Constitution but his mentor Nandalal Bose, who shouldered the responsibility of the overall project, saw things from historic perspectives and, therefore, strongly insisted that Rammanohar sign at least some of the pages "so that future generations are able to recognize, remember and celebrate the artist who ornamented the Constitution of India." In fact, in addition to all the embellishments, most of the basic sketches, line-drawings (pictured) and designs for final illumination of the original manuscript of Constitution of India were executed by Rammanohar, who was the senior-most and favorite disciple of Nandalal Bose. On the original manuscript of Constitution of India, Rammanohar's artworks on page 1 (Harappan seal), 102 (Lanka), 104 (Vikramaditya and his coin/seal), 105 (Nalanda seal), 106 (Kalinga archer), 113 (Nataraja and Swastika), 160 (Subhas Chandra Bose), 167 (Landscape), 181 (Maritime Expedition motif), 231-232 (borders) bear testimony to his saintly refusal to sign his artworks as a mark of his altruistic contribution to the Nation.

In the nationalistic style typical of the revivalist Bengal School of Art, Rammanohar executed a myriad of fresco-secco in 1952–53 on the walls and the dome of Shaheed-Smarak or Martyrs'-Memorial Concert Hall in Jabalpur, depicting various episodes and landmarks in India's struggle for independence starting from 1654 CE and ending with the unfurling of Indian tricolour on Independence Day in 1947 CE. These were the leftover-drawings that were to be included in the Constitution, but could not be. Of particular significance are the one depicting the Quit India Movement (pictured) which has also been published in Encyclopædia Britannica and the one on Rani Durgavati, which has been credited with the very first unambiguous painting of the valiant warrior queen of the Gondwana-fiefdom of Garha-Mandla who dared to challenge Akbar's mighty army in order to safeguard her country's independence.

Likewise, Rammanohar also executed Fresco-secco mural depicting the birth of Gautama Buddha on the walls of Kala Bhavana hostel building in Visva-Bharati University, Shantiniketan.

In preparation for the 59th annual congregation of national leaders in Kalyani, West Bengal in 1954, Rammanohar and his team illuminated the entire venue, especially the gateway and the stage, with panels and posters on nationalistic themes using locally procured biodegradable material, natural earth colours and Khadi. Rammanohar received widespread acclaim for these artworks.

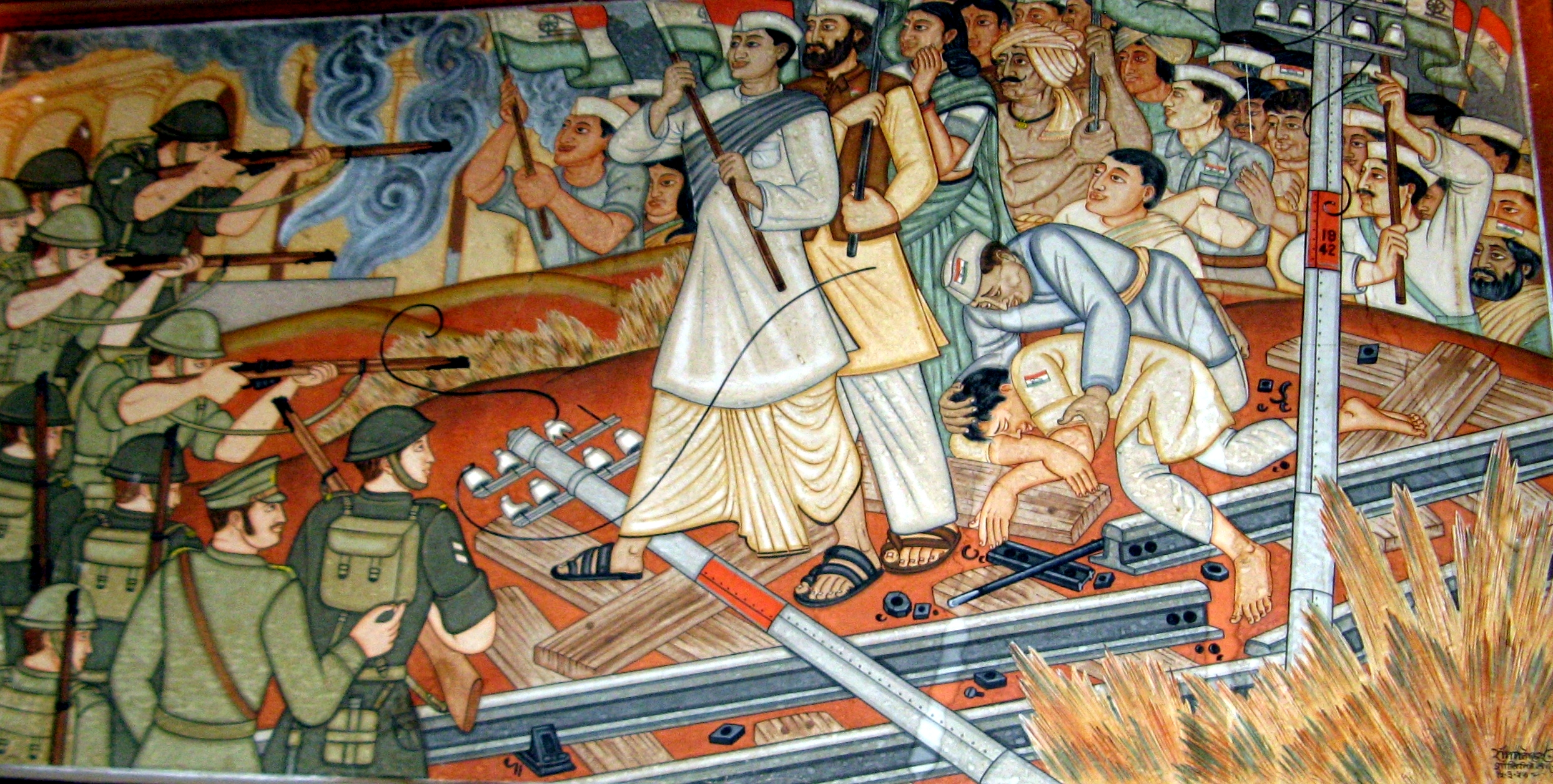
Quit India Movement: A fresco in Martyrs'-Memorial Concert Hall in Jabalpur

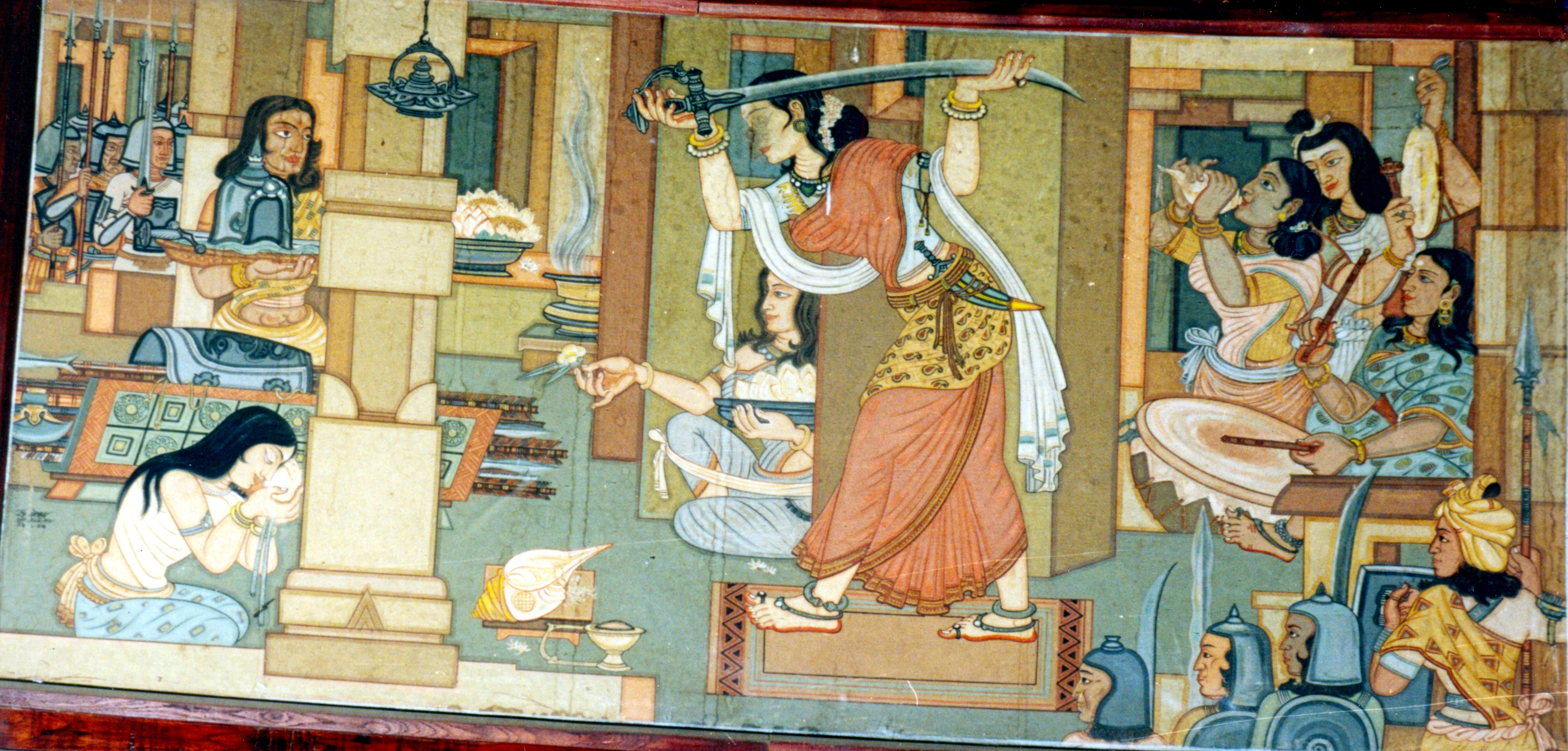
Rani Durgavati gearing up to challenge Akbar's army: A fresco in Martyrs'-Memorial Concert Hall in Jabalpur

== Cultural diplomacy ==
As a scholar and cultural emissary, the Indian government sent Rammanohar to the Far East between 1957 and 1959 to "establish a direct cross-cultural and inter-civilization bridge". While in China, Rammanohar worked with great maestros Qi Baishi, Li Keran, Chen Banding, Pan Tianshou, Wu Jingding, Wu Zuoren, Li Kuchan, Fu Baoshi, Yu Fei'an, executed numerous artworks jointly that include the famous painting Meishan Bridge pictured drying in the background, and interacted with a few political top brass after Phase-I of the Chinese Hundred Flowers Campaign. In unison with Rahul Sankrityayan, Rammanohar's creative initiative in cultural diplomacy has been credited with easing tensions substantially over the disputed Sino-Indian border for a few years.

Rammanohar also spread Indian art overseas while personally mastering all three far-eastern schools of painting Kung-pi, Shui-mo and Xie-yi, as well as the lacquer-work. As such, classic Indian influences are clearly evident in some of the artworks of Ye Qianyu, Shi Lu and many other renowned far-eastern painters. Rammanohar has, thus, occasionally been referred-to as the Huen Tsang of India.

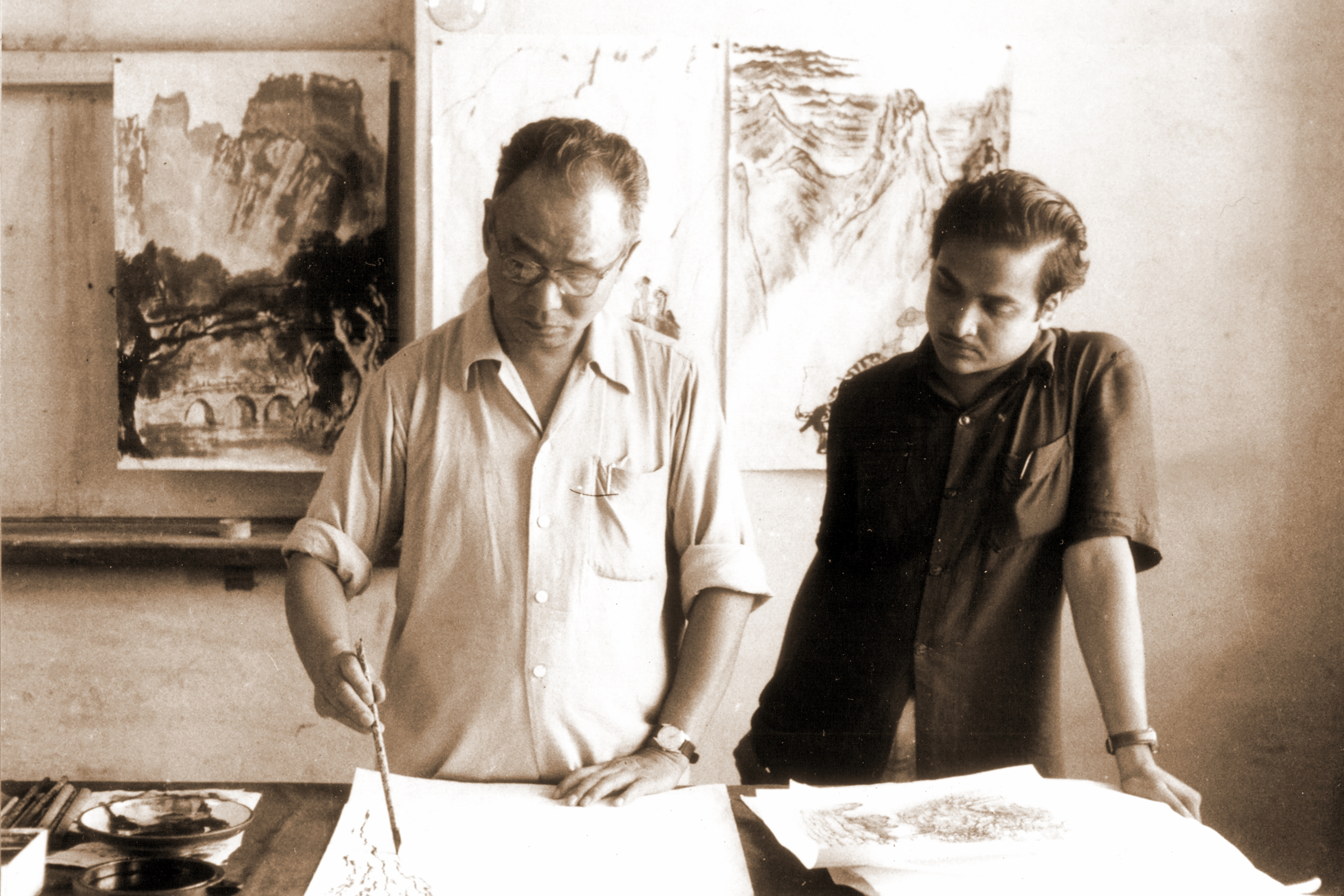
Chinese maestro Li Keran visiting Rammanohar's studio in Peking c.1957

== Interaction with contemporaries ==
Of his Indian contemporaries, he was particularly close to S. H. Raza, B. C. Sanyal, K. G. Subramanyan and Narayan Shridhar Bendre. Raza visited Rammanohar's studio in India and he also visited Raza's studio in 1997 during his sojourn in Europe. Likewise, Jagdish Swaminathan in 1987 and M. F. Husain in 1986 visited Rammanohar's studio, in addition to visiting his exhibitions in India and Europe. Modern painter Akbar Padamsee was so inspired by his art-genre that he not only acknowledged it but also expressed his keen desire to learn it from Rammanohar. With Rammanohar, some of these artists even exchanged paintings as gifts. As such, in addition to artworks of the above, his diverse collection also included paintings of Kattingeri Krishna Hebbar, Abdulrahim Apabhai Almelkar, Gopal Ghose, Manjit Bawa, Jeram Patel, Jyoti Bhatt, Jogen Chowdhury, Manohar Akre, Ram Kumar in addition to those of the Santiniketan art maestros, that he gave away. Other artists, sculptors and printmakers who visited Rammanohar's studio from time to time included Surendranath Kar, Avtar Singh Panwar, Kripal Singh Shekhawat, Balbir Singh Katt, Ghulam Mohammed Sheikh, Chinmay Mehta, Somnath Hore, Sukhen Ganguly, Sovon Som, Jadunath Supakar, Biswarup Bose. Even litterateurs like Nirmal Verma and Ashok Vajpeyi visited his studio-cum-residence.

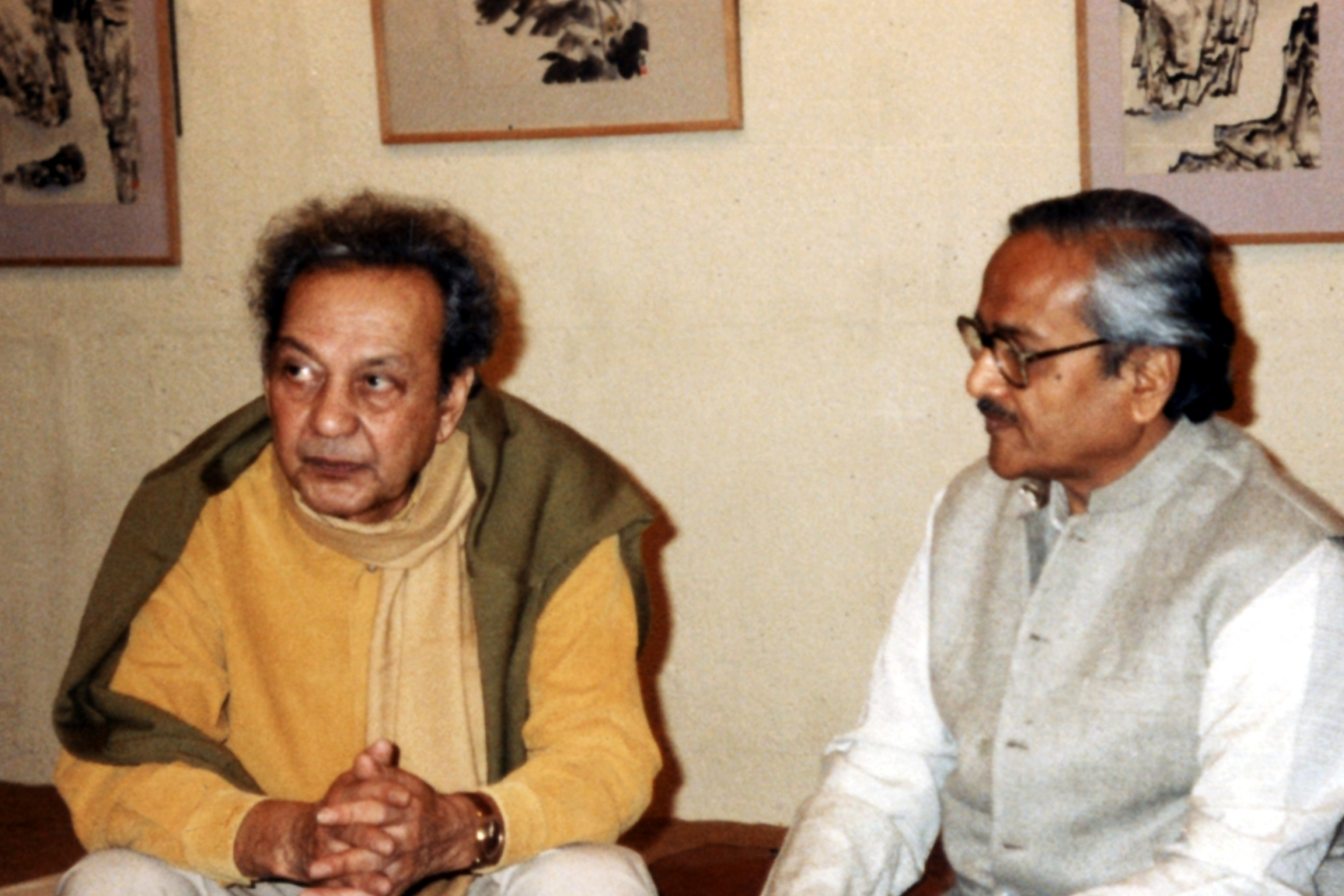
Padma-Vibhushan S.H. Raza visiting Rammanohar

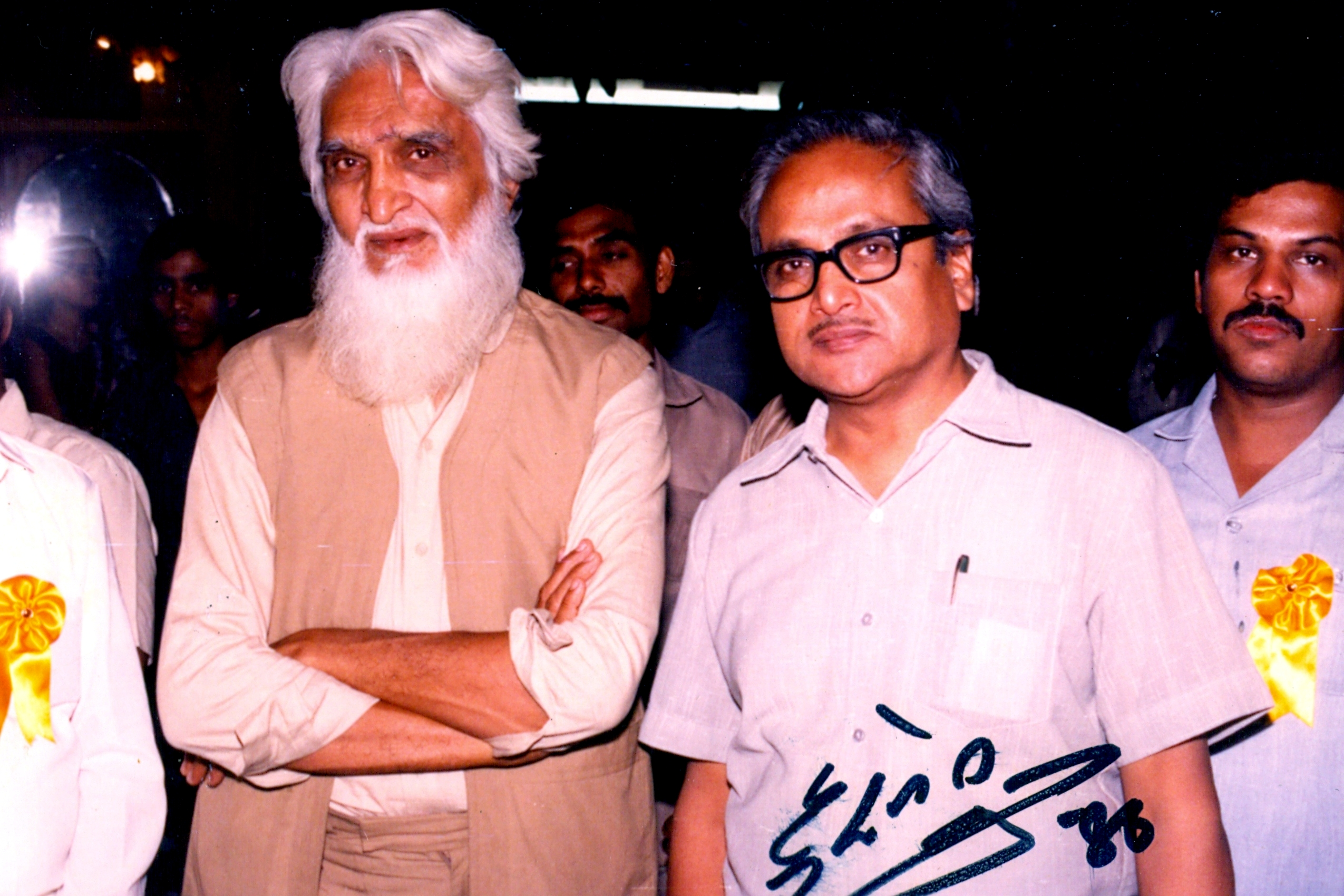
Padma-Vibhushan M.F. Husain with Rammanohar

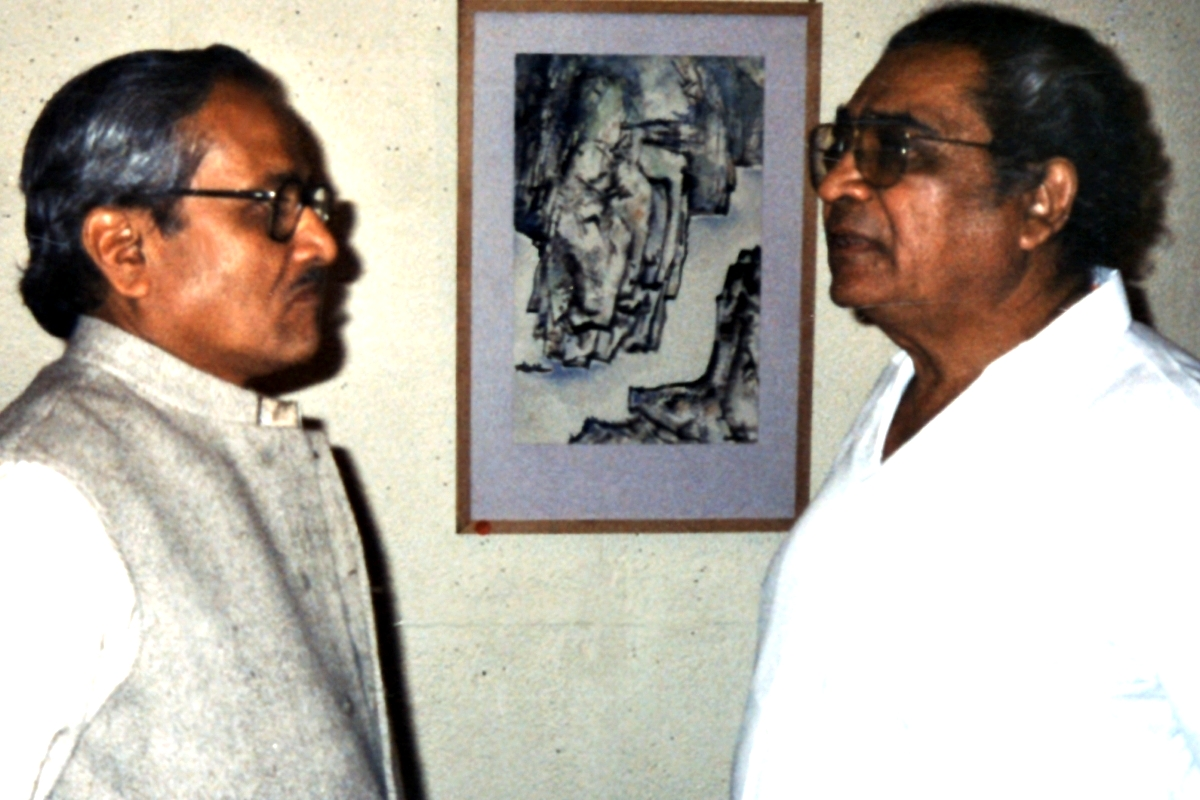
Padma-Bhushan Akbar Padamsee with Rammanohar

== International collections ==
- The British Museum, London, UK.
- The British Empire and Commonwealth Museum, Bristol, UK.
- The Victoria and Albert Museum, London, UK.
- The Organization for Industrial, Spiritual and Cultural Advancement International, Tokyo, Japan.
- Tate Britain at Millbank, London, UK.
- The Imperial Commonwealth Institute, London, UK.
- The University of Saskatchewan, Canada.
- The University of Birmingham Barber Institute of Fine Arts, Birmingham, UK.
- University of Reading, UK.
- AAFC, Federal Government of Canada.
- Air India Art Collection, Mumbai, India.
- The Observer, Mumbai, India.
- Lalit Kala Akademi, New Delhi, India.
- India Tourism Development Corporation, New Delhi, India.
- The Rashtrapati Bhavan (Presidential Palace), New Delhi, India.
- China Central Academy of Fine Arts, Beijing, People's Republic of China.
- The Kala Bhavana Collections at Visva-Bharati University, Santiniketan, India.
- The Roopankar Museum Bharat Bhavan, Bhopal, India.
- The Indira Kala Sangeet University, Khairagarh, India.
- The Rani Durgavati Museum, Jabalpur, India.
- The Martyr's Memorial Permanent Art Collection, Jabalpur, India.
- Government Kalaniketan Institute of Fine Arts, Jabalpur, India.

== Worldwide auctions ==
Rammanohar's paintings have been auctioned alongside those of Hebbar, Husain, Raza, Souza, Gaitonde, Subramanyan, Pyne and others in New York and London by Sotheby's.

== Selected honors and awards ==
- KalaShri title award for exemplary contributions in the field of fine arts, New Delhi, India, 2001.
- Award of Honor for demonstrating the highest order of active concern for humanitarian services and social welfare, Lions International, 1997.
- Veteran Artist Award, AIFACS, New Delhi, India, 1993.
- Shikhar Samman for excellence, outstanding creativity and long time dedication to arts, Bhopal, India, 1991.
- Special Award, AIFACS, New Delhi, India, 1953.
- Special Award, Bombay Province, British India, 1944.

There were media reports about his name having been recommended for the highest civilian honor Padma Vibhushan for 2007–08, but he passed-away before the final list could be drawn-up in New Delhi.

A campaign for bestowal of India's highest civilian award upon him was initiated by Parliamentarian (later Chief Minister) Bhupinder Singh Hooda (04–01–1999), Parliamentarian Jayashree Banerjee (12–12–2001) and Vice Chancellor Justice Gulab Gupta (04–11–2003). For conferment posthumously, it has since been supported by Assembly Speaker Ishwardas Rohani (10–11–2009), Parliamentarian Rakesh Singh (11–11–2009), Legislator Lakhan Ghanghoriya (15–11–2009), Bar Council Chairman Rameshwar Neekhra (19–11–2009), Union Minister of Science and Technology (13–12–2016), MP Artists' Forum (20–12–2016), Governor of West Bengal (27–12–2016), Legislator Ajay Vishnoi (25–10–2017), ex Cabinet Minister and ex Parliamentarian Jayashree Banerjee (15–04–2025), and many others.

== Selected exhibitions ==
Rammanohar's artworks have been exhibited in several countries. Though the list is not exhaustive, some of his exhibitions are listed below.

- Samanvai Art Gallery, Jaipur, India, 2013.
- Sansruti Retrospective Show, Bharat Bhavan, Bhopal, India, 2012.
- Image of India, Art Pilgrim, London, UK, 2005.
- Hiroshima Never Again, Arpana Art Gallery, New Delhi, India, 2005.
- Remembering Bhopal, Varalakshami Art Gallery, New Delhi, India, 2004.
- Indian Old and Contemporary Paintings, Aryan Art Gallery, New Delhi, India, 2003.
- Visual Art Gallery at India Habitat Centre, New Delhi, India, 2002, 1999.
- Art Alive Gallery, New Delhi, India, 2001.
- Gallerie Ganesha, New Delhi, India, 1999, 1997, 1994.
- Art in Cinema, Arushi Arts, New Delhi, India, 1999.
- Beatrice Royal Contemporary Art Gallery, Southampton, UK, 1999, 1998.
- The Williamson Art Gallery, Bidston, UK, 1997.
- TheBhavan UK Centre, London, UK, 1997.
- The Westminster Academy, London, UK, 1997.
- The Nehru Centre International Art Gallery, London, UK, 1997.
- Jellys LegdChick Art Gallery, Reading-Berkshire, UK, 1996, 1995.
- Indian National Exhibition of Art, Lalit Kala Akademi, Chennai (Madras), India, 1993.
- The Jehangir Art Gallery, Mumbai (Bombay), India, 1993.
- The All India Fine Arts and Crafts Society (AIFACS), New Delhi, India, 1993, 1991, 1990, 1953.
- The Birla Academy of Arts, Kolkata (Calcutta), India, 1992.
- The India International Centre, New Delhi, India, 1992.
- The Bharat Bhavan, Bhopal, India, 1992, 1991.
- The Taj Art Gallery, Mumbai (Bombay), 1992.
- Madhya Pradesh Kala Parishad, Jabalpur: 1991, 1990, 1986, 1968, 1966, 1965; Bhopal: 1978, 1973; Raipur: 1967, 1964, 1963; Gwalior: 1964.
- Lalit Kala Akademi, New Delhi, India, 1987, 1978, 1974, 1969.
- The Visva-Bharati University, Shantiniketan, India, 1987, 1972, 1960, 1959, 1951.
- The China Academy of Art, Shanghai, People's Republic of China, 1958.
- The Sichuan Fine Arts Institute (SFAI), Chongqing (Chungking), People's Republic of China, 1958.
- The China Central Academy of Fine Arts, Beijing (Peking), People's Republic of China, 1957.
