= Fresco-secco =

Wall painting technique

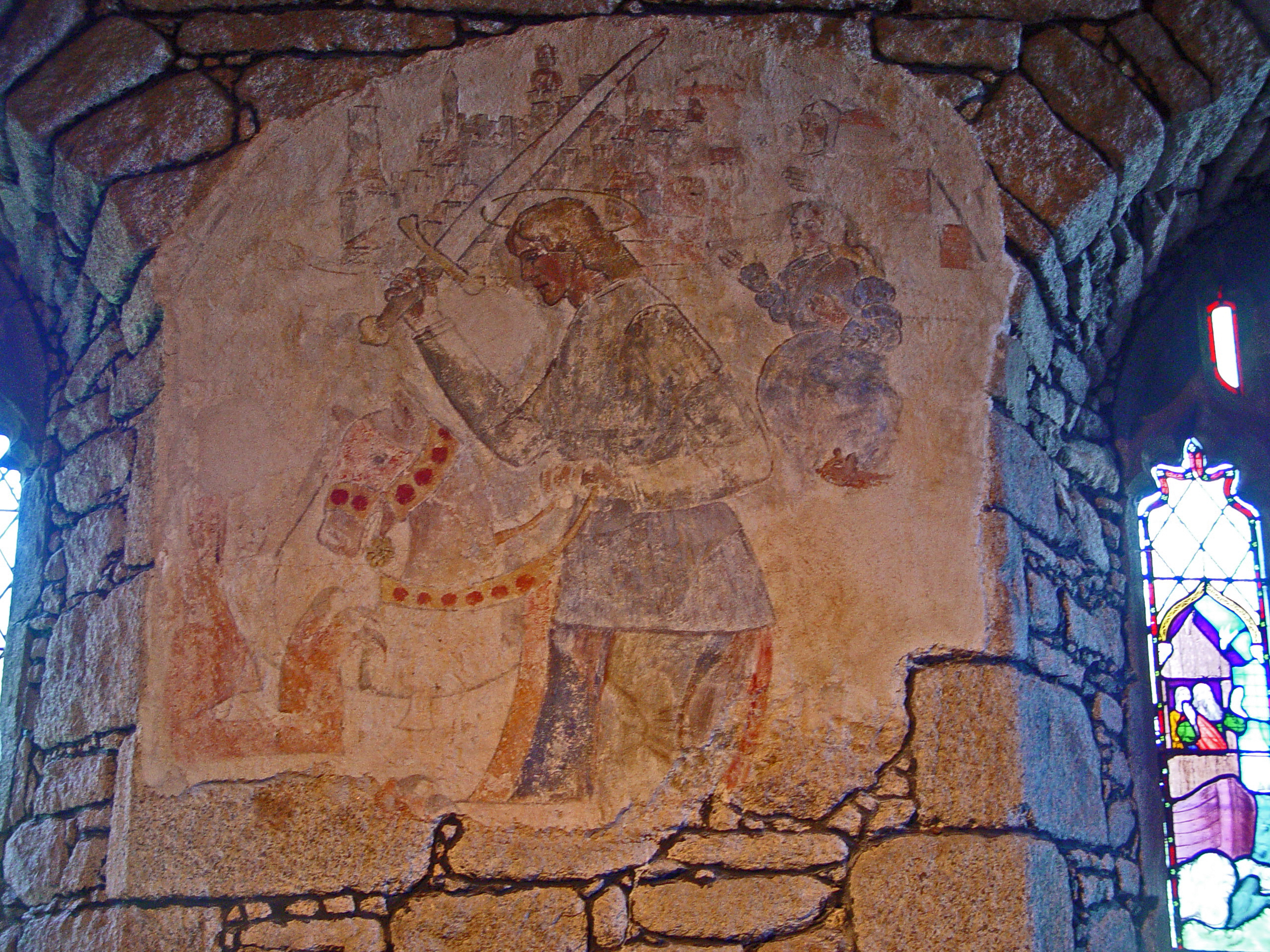
A Fresco-secco wall painting in St Just in Penwith Parish Church, Cornwall, UK. The painting was created in the 15th century and depicts Saint George fighting the dragon.

Fresco secco (or a secco or fresco finto) is a wall painting technique where pigments mixed with an organic binder or lime (or both) are applied onto dry plaster. The paints used, for example, can be casein paint, tempera, oil paint, or silicate mineral paint. If the pigments are mixed with lime water or lime milk and applied to a dry plaster the technique is called lime secco painting. The secco technique contrasts with the fresco technique, where the painting is executed on a layer of wet plaster.

Because the pigments do not become part of the wall, as in buon fresco, fresco secco paintings are less durable. The colors may flake off the painting as time goes by, but this technique has the advantages of a longer working time and retouchability. In Italy, the fresco technique was reintroduced around 1300 and led to an increase in the general quality of mural painting. This technological change coincided with the realistic turn in Western art and the changing liturgical use of murals.

The treatise Silparatna by Kumaradeva (8th century) gives an account of the fresco-secco painting technology in detail. According to this text, a picture should be painted with appropriate colours, along with proper forms and sentiments (rasas), and moods and actions (bhavas). White, yellow, red, black and terre verte are pointed out in the text as pure colors. Different shades were also prepared from these original colors. Five types of brushes with various shapes and sizes (flat, long, medium, etc.) made of animal hair and grass fibre are also recommended. Specialist painters and decorators still use this technique to great effect in the world of interior design (e.g., faux marble).

== Notable fresco-secco artists ==
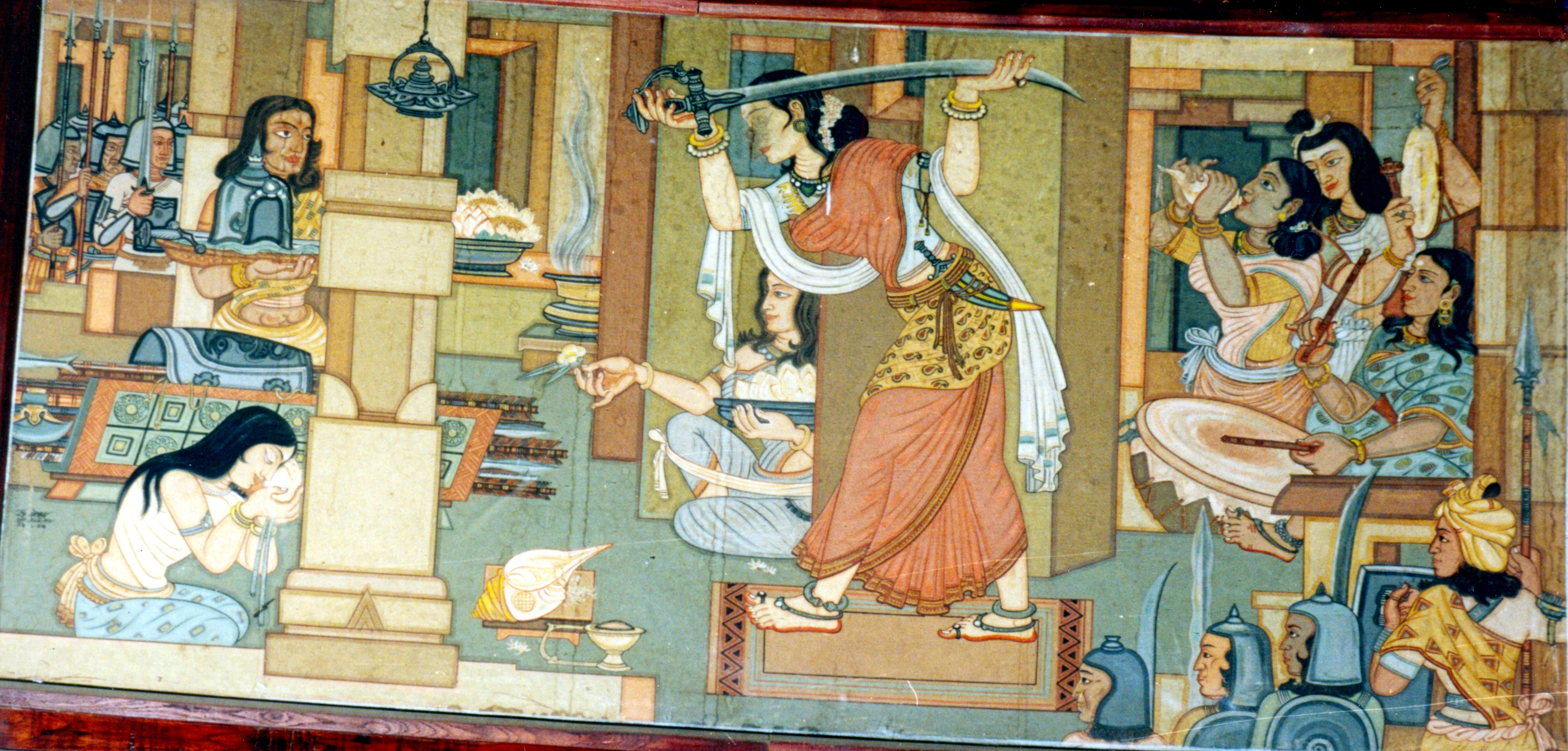
A fresco-secco by Beohar Rammanohar Sinha on the walls of Shaheed-Smarak in Jabalpur (India)

- Giotto
- Albertus Pictor
- June McEwan, a Scottish artist who recreates historic Scottish interiors
- Beohar Rammanohar Sinha, an artist from India whose frescoes of daily life, family themes, and feasting ornament the walls and gigantic dome of an auditorium
- Rudolph F. Zallinger, whose Age of Mammals, a 60-by-5-foot (18.3 by 1.5 m) mural painted from 1961 to 1967 on the south wall of the Yale Peabody Museum of Natural History, is painted in this style

== See also ==
- Art movement
- Creativity techniques
- List of art media
- List of art movements
- List of most expensive paintings
- List of most expensive sculptures
- List of art techniques
- List of sculptors
