= Elaine Breiger =

American painter

- Born: 1933 (age 92–93); Springfield, Massachusetts, U.S.
- Education: Art Students League of New York; Cooper Union
- Known for: Painting printmaking

Elaine Breiger (born 1933) is an American painter and printmaker.

Born in Springfield, Massachusetts, Breiger studied at the Art Students League of New York and the Cooper Union, and worked with Krishna Reddy. She was also a member of The Society of American Artists. She has exhibited widely, and received grants during her career from the New York State Council on the Arts and the National Endowment for the Arts, in 1974 and 1979 respectively. The Brooklyn Museum, the DeCordova Museum, the Honolulu Academy of Art, and the Library of Congress are among the institutions holding examples of her work.
