= Kumaradeva =

Indian sculptor

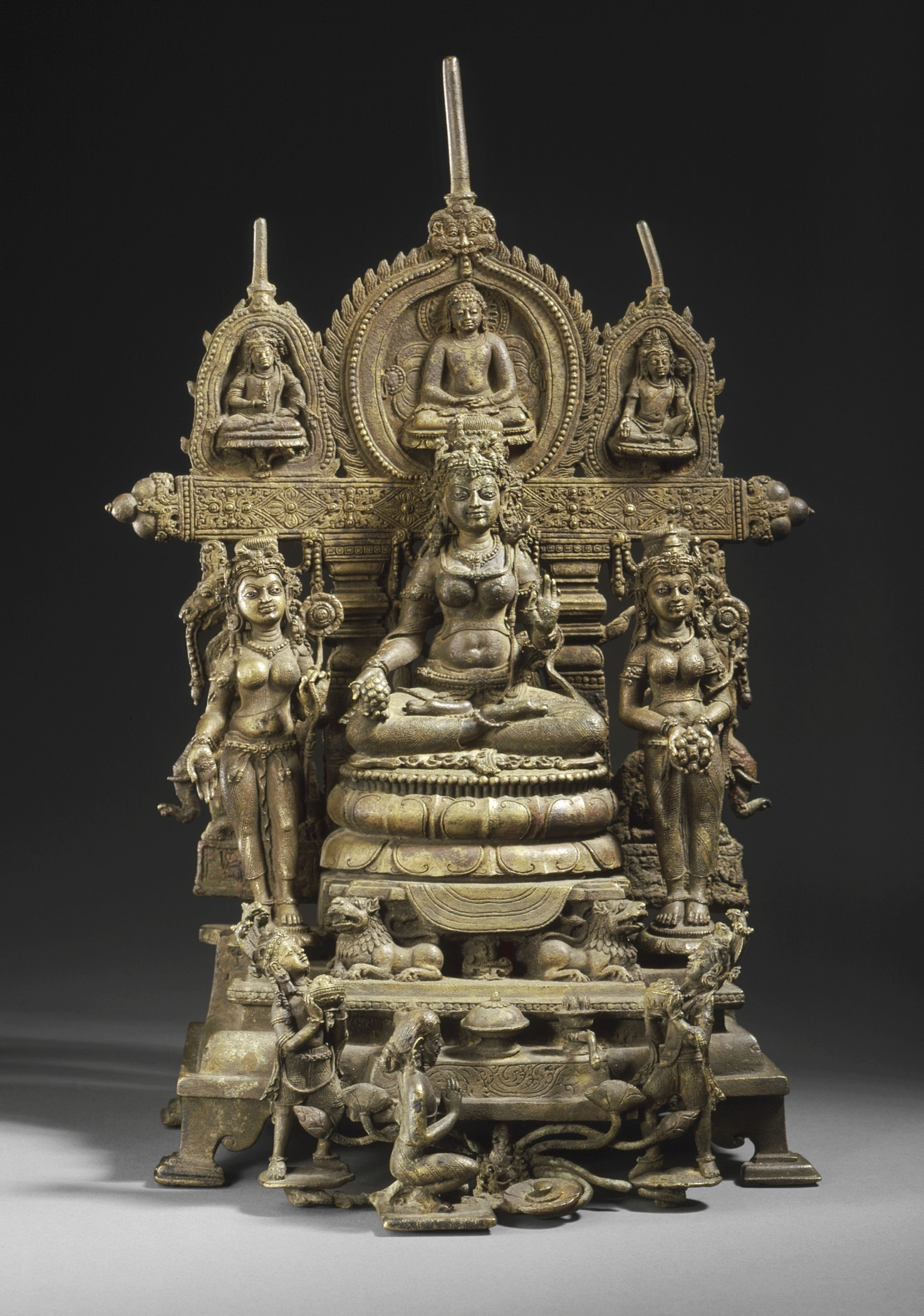
The Buddhist Goddess Shyama Tara (Green Tara) attended by Sita Tara (White Tara) and Bhrikuti. This sculpture, dating to the 8th century, originates from Sirpur, Madhya Pradesh, India. It is attributed to the Kumaradeva. The central figure, Green Tara (Shyama Tara), symbolizes compassion and protection, while White Tara (Sita Tara) represents longevity and healing. Bhrikuti (Yellow Tara) is often considered a fierce manifestation of Tara.

Kumaradeva was an Indian sculptor from the 8th century. His works include The Buddhist Goddess Shyama Tara (Green Tara) Attended by Sita Tara (White Tara) and Bhrikuti He is also the author of the treatise Silparatna, which provides an account of fresco-secco painting techniques in detail. According to this text, a picture should be painted with appropriate colours along with proper forms and sentiments (rasas), and moods and actions (bhavas).
