= Geeta Vadhera =

Indian artist

- Education: College of Art, Delhi
- Website: https://geetavadhera.in/

Geeta Vadhera is an Indian artist. She has exhibited her oil paintings across Italy, Germany, France, Singapore and many cities across India. She has published a book of concrete poetry titled Ansh.

== Early life ==
Geeta Vadhera was born in India to a mother who was an artist. She studied for a Bachelor of Arts at the College of Art, Delhi and undertook further research in France and Germany.

== Career ==
Geeta has shown her artworks in Asia, Australia and Europe.She has had a total of 35 solo exhibitions of her works across the world. In 1986, she showed her paintings at the Orchard Point Gallery in Singapore and the following year at the Funan Centre. In 1988, she exhibited 24 paintings at the Arts Festival Fringe. In 2011, she exhibited her paintings at Jumeirah Emirates Tower at Dubai. Her art has been inspired by the Sufi poetry of Bulleh Shah and the Isha Upanishad.

Geeta's works on Concrete Poetry, the poetry inherent in the Devnagri script, has been stored in the international archives of Concrete Poetry in Germany.

Geeta has her studio in Whitefield, Bangalore, India. She published a book of poetry written in Hindi, entitled Ansh (A Part of Me) and also has written books about art for children. In 2021, she addressed the Horasis event discussing art after the COVID-19 pandemic in India.

== Awards and recognition ==
Geeta received the Bharat Nirman super achiever award in 1995.

== See also ==
Modern Indian painting
