= Jagmohan Chopra =

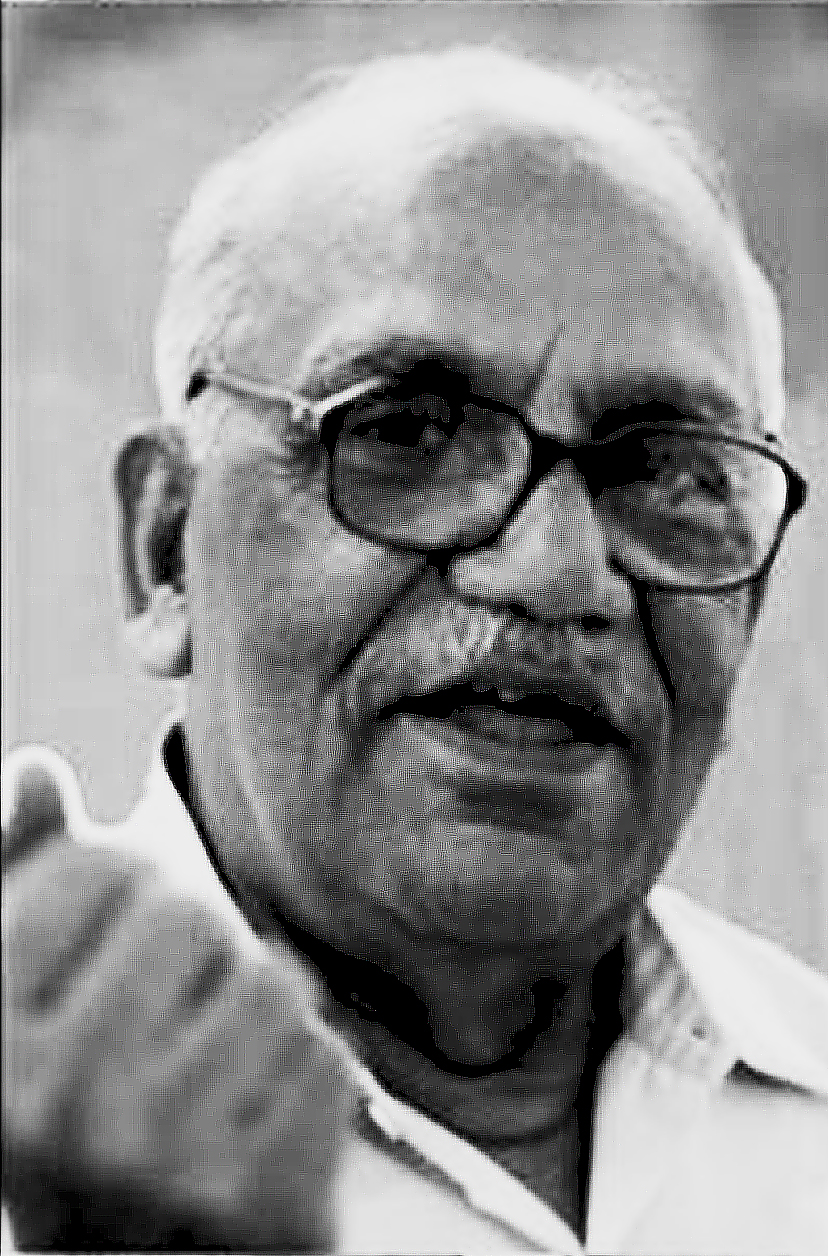
- Born: 1935; Lahore, Punjab, British India
- Died: 2013 (aged 77–78); Delhi, India
- Education: School of art (Art Department) of Delhi Polytechnic
- Known for: Principal, Government College of Arts, Chandigarh
- Movement: Group 8
- Awards: Kala Ratna

Shri Jagmohan Chopra (1935–2013) was an Indian printmaker, painter and photographer who promoted printmaking in India. His contribution in this regard has been honoured by awarding him Kala Ratna in 1988. He was chairman and later on President of AIFACS. His contributed to developing the activities of the Society in Delhi and Panchkula.

== Education and career ==
Jagmohan Chopra was a student of the School of Art (Art Department) of Delhi Polytechnic, which became the independent College of Art in the year 1964. After completing his National Diploma he was appointed as a lecturer in the College of Art, New Delhi. In the year 1976, he became Principal of the Government College of Arts, Chandigarh, and transformed that college into a successful learning centre of art.

== Career ==
Shri Jagmohan Chopra was a well-known printmaker, painter and photographer who promoted printmaking in India. His contribution in this regard has been honored by awarding him 'Kala Ratna" in 1988. He was a life member of the Society. He was chairman and later on President of AIFACS. He experimented with the process of intaglio on a cardboard plate by creating surfaces of different levels and textures. This process helped print-makers to experiment creatively. Zinc plates were either not available or very expensive to afford for emerging younger artists. He established an etching press at his residence at Pusa Campus for graduated students and some senior artists. There he formed Group 8 – an association of working artists devoted to print making in order to promote print making. It gave successful results and print making was at its peak in the country. He had knowledge in various diverse subjects like homeopathy, palmistry, cooking, and photography. He took a keen interest in photography and added special sections in the all India exhibition of prints. He was a product of an art college at a time of economic troubles but was determined to go ahead and put whatever meager resources he could manage to establish his etching studio and for photography. He did not pursue the commercial side of the art profession and stayed true to his principles.
