= Manishi Dey =

Indian painter of the Bengal School of Art (1909-1966)

- মনীষী দে
- Manishi Dey, Bombay, 1952
- Born: Bijoy Chandra Dey; 22 September 1909; Dhaka, British India
- Died: 31 January 1966; Kolkata, India
- Known for: Painting, Drawing

Manishi Dey (22 September 1909 – 31 January 1966) was an Indian painter of the Bengal School of Art. Manishi Dey was the younger brother of Mukul Dey, a pioneering Indian artist and dry point etcher. Their two sisters, Annapura and Rani, were accomplished in arts and crafts as well.

== Early life and education ==
He was born in Dhaka, Bengal Presidency. Originally named Bijoy Chandra, Manishi was the fifth child, and third son, of Purnashashi Devi and Kula Chandra Dey. In 1917, at the age of eight years, Manishi Dey's father died and he was sent to the Santiniketan school Patha Bhavana, which was founded by the Nobel Prize-winning poet Rabindranath Tagore. He seemed to dislike the preparatory conventions of Santiniketan and became mutinous. His education changed favourably when he came in contact with Abanindranath Tagore’s Bengal School of Art, the nephew of Rabindranath Tagore. He became one of the most versatile students of Abanindranath, whose other close students also included Nandalal Bose, Asit Kumar Haldar, Sarada Ukil, Mukul Dey, K. Venkatappa and Jamini Roy. These were the leading artists that spread the form and spirit of the neo-Bengal school throughout India.

The political and religious developments in the Indian subcontinent were a major influence during the life of Manishi Dey. Just shortly before his birth, Bengal was partitioned into an Eastern and Western part, known as the Partition of Bengal (1905). The area was divided a second time in 1947, known as the Partition of Bengal (1947). It was only after the death of Manishi Dey that Bengal became an independent country in 1971 after the Bangladesh Liberation War. These political changes during the colonization and decolonization of India were a major influence on the education of Dey. Abanindranath Tagore promoted traditional Indian culture in his teachings, which built the foundation for the artistic works of Manishi Dey throughout his life.

== 1928–1947: Monochrome Period ==
One of the major sources of Manishi Dey's inspirations were his travels as he traversed tirelessly throughout the Indian subcontinent in search of varied and newer visual idioms. His voyages helped him becoming a finished artist in 'Indian Painting' and the water colour 'Wash' technique, an art style he used masterfully in his works.

In 1928, Manishi Dey's brother Mukul decided to settle in Santiniketan and to become the first Indian principal of Government School of Arts in Calcutta, a position he held until 1943. Almost in stark contrast to his steady brother Mukul, the year 1928 marked the start of series of exhibitions all over India. At just 19 years of age, Manishi Dey held his first solo show 1928 in Calcutta where his brother was establishing himself. Many exhibitions followed, including in Nagpur (1928), Madras (1929), Bangalore (1930), Ceylon (1930), Bombay (1932), Shrinagar (1932), Arah (1934), Benares (1934), Nainital (1936), Bombay (1937), Pune (1939), Kolhapur (1940), Baroda (1942), Gwalior (1944), Delhi (1947). In 1946, his works were exhibited by the All India Fine Arts and Crafts Society (AIFACS) in New Delhi, jointly with other leading Indian artists such as Amrita Sher-Gil and Sailoz Mookherjea.

Manishi Dey interacted closely with artists like M. F. Husain, F.N. Souza, S.H. Raza, Sailoz Mookherjea and Shantanu Ukil in New Delhi during the late-1940s and early-1950s. He later became a member of the Bombay Progressive Artists' Group (PAG), which was founded in 1947. PAG was one of the most influential forces on modern Indian painting, even though it was disbanded within a decade in 1956. The association with the group helped Dey to embrace cubist art and a variety of other media. Dey became thus one of the major contributors and transformers of Modern Indian painting.

His broad interests can also be seen in a collaboration with Curuppumullage Jinarajadasa, the Sri Lankan theosophist and philosopher. In 1930, Manishi Dey illustrated the title of a booklet with lecture notes by Jinarajadasa.

== 1948–1966: Red and Orange Period ==
At the end of World War II, buoyed by the newly established Indian Independence, Manishi Dey's works changed radically and got a new freshness and vitality that lacked in his early years. A main influence was the Bombay Progressive Artists Group, which enabled him to exchange with numerous leading artists of his time. In 1949 he painted a series of twenty-two moving images of non-Muslim refugees from Pakistan that captured the agony and pain of their flight. During the following years, he continued exhibitions, including in Bombay (1950), Allahabad (1953), Bangalore (1957), Ootacamund (1959), Madras (1960) and Trivandrum (1961). Through his wide prominence, he became one of the leading artists to promote traditional Indian Cultural Heritage.

In an article in 1953, he encouraged young artists to follow their traditional cultural roots. His paintings were well received and highly regarded by fellow artists and critics in the decade prior to his untimely death. The Bangalore writer and scholar Venkataramiah Sitaramiah praised his works highly and termed the phase his "red and orange" period. Two prominent paintings by Manishi Dey from this period are "Daughter of the Soil" from 1956 and "Bengal Women".

One of the foremost proponents of the artists of the Progressive Art Movement was Richard Bartholomew, a writer, art critic, poet, painter, photographer, who was also a one-time secretary of the Lalit Kala Academy. Bartholomew published critical writings for more than three decades about Indian art, and he was deeply integrated in the art movement at the time of India's transition into independence. Bartholomew's writings helped artists such as FN Souza, SH Raza, MF Husain and Manishi Dey to break free from the Bengal School of Art and establish a new Indian avant-garde. The books "A Critic's Eye" and "The Art Critic" publish a selection of his writings and photographs from the 1950s up to the 80s, giving an insider's account of the untold story of Modern Indian Art.

Leading figures of the PAG went into exile abroad during the 1950s, often pushed out by Hindu extremism. Manishi Dey meanwhile remained in India, especially Bombay and Delhi, until his death in 1966.

== Legacy ==
He died in Kolkata at the height of his career at 56 years of age. The works of Manishi Dey have been exhibited for many years in various Indian Museums and Galleries, such as the National Gallery of Modern Art NGMA in Mumbai, the State Lalit Kala Akademi in Luknow, Uttar Pradesh, the Delhi Art Gallery, the Allahabad Museum, the Salarjung Museum, Hyderabad, Kala Bhavan in Santiniketan and in the Samdani Art Foundation in Dhaka, one of the largest collections of Bangladeshi and Indian art worldwide.

His works receive a renewed international interest since the end of the 20th Century and were exhibited in London and New York.

Since the early 21st Century, Manishi Dey's works are also included at major international auction houses, such as Bonhams and Christie's, as well as at numerous high-profile Indian auction houses.

In 2015, an auction of Christie's in New York promoted the Progressive Artists Group as the "most influential group of Indian art ever created". The result was sales totalling more than US$8M, above the high estimate. This showed the strong interest in Modern Indian Art. With a hammer price of more than US$4M, the painting "Birth" by F.N. Souza realised the highest price ever for a work by an Indian artist.
