= Pablo Bartholomew =

Indian photographer (born 1955)

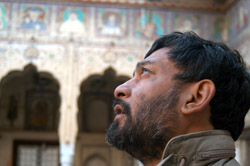
- Born: 18 December 1955 (age 70); New Delhi, India
- Education: Modern School
- Occupation: Photojournalism
- Father: Richard Bartholomew
- Awards: World Press Photo of the Year (1985)
- Honours: Padma Shri; Ordre des Arts et des Lettres
- Website: www.pablobartholomew.com

Pablo Bartholomew (born 1955) is an Indian photojournalist and an independent photographer based in New Delhi, India. He is noted for his photography, as an educator running photography workshops, and as manager of MediaWeb, a software company specialising in photo database services and server-based digital archiving systems.

He was awarded the Padma Shri by the Government of India in 2013. In 2014, he received the Ordre des Arts et des Lettres.

== Early life and education ==
The older of two siblings, Bartholomew was born on 18 December 1955 in New Delhi, India. His father, Richard Bartholomew (1926–1985) was a Burmese refugee who settled in the Indian capital and who came to be one of the country's leading art critics, as well as a painter, poet, and photographer. His mother, Rati Batra, a Partition refugee, was a well-known theatre activist and one of the founding members of Yatrik, a theatre company established in 1964.

Bartholomew studied at Modern School, where his father taught English. He abandoned his schooling in Class Nine, adopting the camera instead. In his early teens he photographed his family, friends, people, and cities. He participated in the city’s emerging theatre scene and even produced, in the ’70s, a series of events called “Thru Pablo’s Eyes” which was based on rock music accompanied with slide and film projection and live performers. In 1975, he was awarded First Prize by World Press Photo for his series on morphine addicts in India titled Time is the Mercy of Eternity. To make ends meet, and to finance his photo documentary projects, he worked in advertising and as a stills photographer, most notably on the sets of Satyajit Ray's Shatranj ke Khilari (1977) and Richard Attenborough's Gandhi (1982). In the latter, he is specifically credited as a stillsman for the second unit.

== Photojournalism ==
From 1984 until 2000, Bartholomew was represented by the French-American news photo agency, Gamma Liaison during which time he primarily covered conflicts and developments in the South Asian region. His photographs were published in New York Times, Newsweek, Time, Business Week, National Geographic, GEO, Der Spiegel, Figaro, Paris Match, The Telegraph, The Sunday Times Magazine, The Guardian, and Observer Magazine, among others.

He covered the Bhopal disaster, the funeral of Indira Gandhi and aftermath of her assassination—the Hindu-Sikh riots, the rise of the Khalistani movement, the political career of Rajiv Gandhi, the funeral of Mother Teresa, the cyclones in Bangladesh, the Nellie conflict in Assam, and the demolition of the Babri Masjid, which almost got him killed; among many other news stories.

He was awarded the World Press Photo of the Year in 1985 for his now iconic image of a half-buried child victim of the Bhopal disaster.

== Photography career ==
Bartholomew had his first photography lessons at home, in his father’s darkroom. “When we went to our summerhouse, I would be with him in the darkroom, looking at the images emerging in the developing tray. That was pure magic. He didn't teach me anything specific about photography. What I took from him was the need to be a more sophisticated man—a Renaissance man, like him—whom I'm not,” said Bartholomew in an interview with photography website, Invisible Photographer Asia. During his teenage years, he started photographing his family and friends and life on the streets, including the worlds of the marginalised rag pickers, sex workers, beggars, and eunuchs. He first exhibited photographs from this body of work at Art Heritage Gallery, New Delhi, in 1979, and at the Jehangir Art Gallery, Bombay, in 1980. In July 2007, Outside In: A Tale of Three Cities, a retrospective revisiting of the same archive of photographs from his teenage diary, shot in Bombay, Delhi, and Calcutta, was shown at Rencontres d’Arles. In 2008, the show travelled to the National Museum, New Delhi, the National Gallery of Modern Art, Mumbai, Bodhi Art, New York, and in 2009, to Bodhi Berlin. The display of the series at Chobimela VII in Dhaka in January 2013 marked its 12th showing.

He has held a number of fellowships, including one from the Asian Cultural Council, New York (1987), to photograph Indian immigrants in the USA, and one from the Institute of Comparative Studies in Human Culture, Norway (1995), to photograph the Naga tribes in India. Between 2001 and 2003 he ran a photography workshop for emerging photographers in India with the support of the World Press Photo Foundation in Amsterdam. Among his photo essays are "The Chinese in Calcutta," "The Indians in America," and "The Naga Tribes of Northeast India".

== Awards ==
- World Press Photo award for his series on morphine addicts in India (1976)
- World Press Photo of the Year (1985) for the Bhopal Gas Tragedy, where he shot an iconic picture of a little girl being buried.
- Padma Shri Award 2014
- Ordre des Arts et des Lettres, 2014

== Photo Exhibitions and shows ==
Bartholomew's earliest solo exhibitions, in New Delhi in 1980 and Bombay in 1981, dealt with the marginal worlds he inhabited at that time. In 2005 he exhibited at Month of Photography in Tokyo. In 2007 he exhibited at the Rencontres d’Arles photography festival in France, and Newark Museum's Indian Photography and Video Festival.
