= Sailoz Mookherjea =

Indian painter (1906–1960)

- Born: 1906; Calcutta, Bengal Presidency, British India
- Died: 1960 (aged 54); India
- Known for: Painting

Sailoz Mookherjea (1906–1960) was an Indian painter. He was one of the early modernists in Indian art, known for his ability to simplify forms, use vigorous lines, and create dynamic movement in his works. Mookherjea was included in the 1979 list of Nine Masters of the Archaeological Survey of India.

Mookherjea's work was deeply inspired by the people and environments around him. In 1978, India Post released a stamp featuring his painting titled The Mosque.

== Career ==
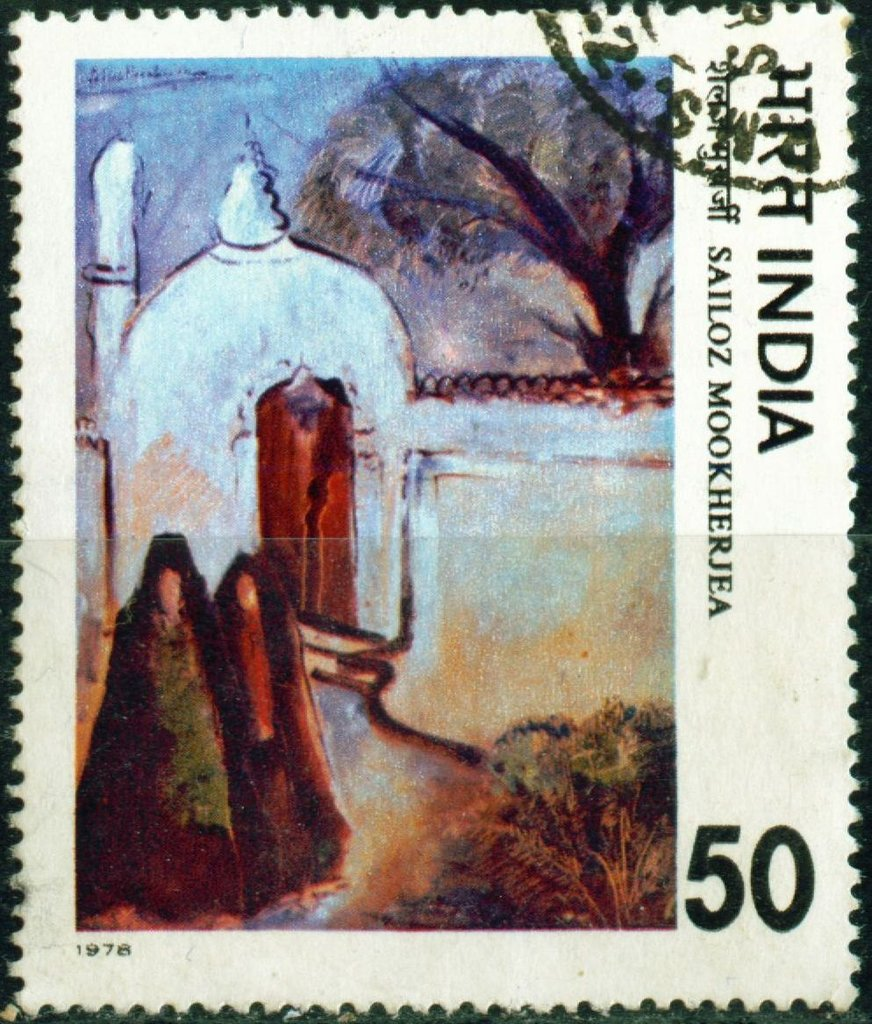
Sailoz Mookherjee Painting Postage stamp, 1978

Sailoz Mookherjea's simplification of form and vibrant use of color were influenced by his time in Europe and inspiration from the works of Henri Matisse. However, his primary influences were folk art and the Basohli miniatures. Mookherjea focused on themes of oneness with nature and rural serenity. His bold lines and powerful color techniques defined his artistic style.

During his time in New Delhi in the 1940s and 1950s, he frequently interacted with other painters from the Bengal school of art, particularly Manishi Dey and Shantanu Ukil.

Mookherjea was highly regarded by both artists, such as Jagdish Swaminathan, and critics like Richard Bartholomew, who made the following remarks about him:

- "There should have been a monument dedicated to Sailoz in the middle of Connaught Place instead of an ugly fountain."
- "There is not a single work of Amrita Sher-Gil which can stand before his painting Washing Day."
- "The reason he has not gotten the recognition is that he lacks pretentiousness."
- For after Amrita Sher-Gil, he has been our most significant painter."
