= Nagasamy Ramachandran =

Indian artist

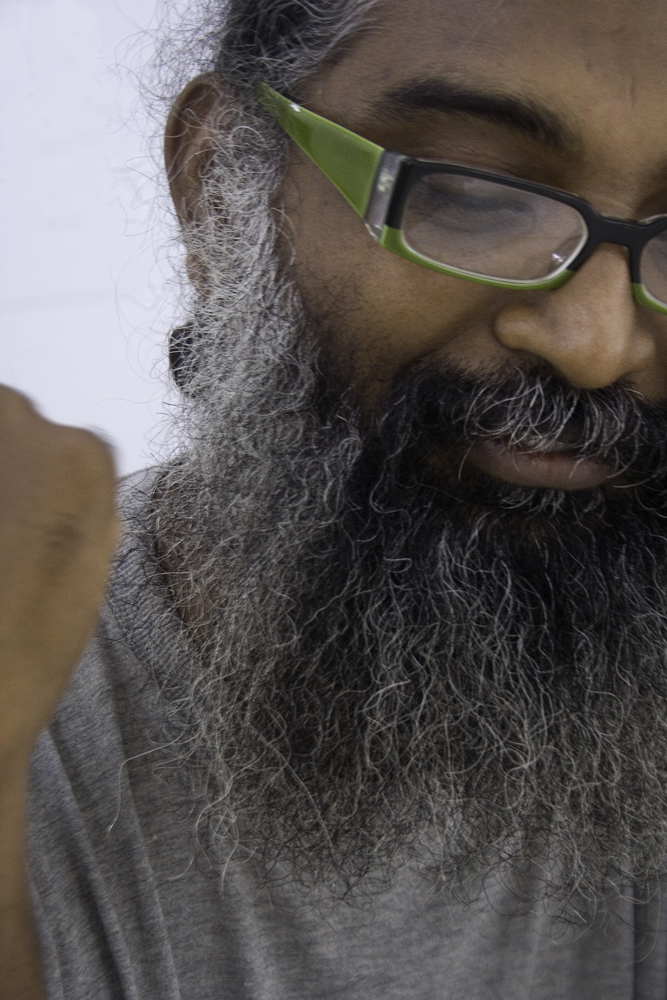
- Ramachandran in 2010
- Born: Ramachandran; 16 May 1975 (age 51); Paramakudi, Tamil Nadu, India
- Citizenship: Indian
- Education: Master of Fine Arts (Painting and Printmaking)
- Alma mater: Government College of Arts and Crafts, Egmore, Chennai.
- Occupation: Contemporary artist
- Writing career
- Language: Tamil, Hindi, English
- Subjects: (Painting and printmaking)
- Notable awards: The Charles Wallace India Trust Award, Visiting Artist Award-Edinburgh printmakers studio, National Award Lalit Kala Academi,

Nagasamy Ramachandran (born 1975) is a contemporary artist born in Paramakudi, Madurai, Tamil Nadu, Received his bachelor's degree (distinction) and master's degree in painting and printmaking from the Government College of Fine Arts, Chennai, University of Madras in 1999. To enhance his technical skill he undertook a course on Care of museum objects at Chennai Museum in 2005. He went to Edinburgh on a Visiting Artist Scholar to Scotland to learn Photo-polymer Etching at Edinburg printmakers in 2006. In 2008 he went to Edinburg College of Arts on Charles Wallace India Trust Award, to learn Glass making a special course BA (hons.). Other than these international credits he has received important national and state awards.

== Awards and honours ==
2011 Audi Ritz icon Award, Chennai. 2008-09 Charles Wallace India trust Award. Visiting Scholar to UK.Charles Wallace India Trust Award 2008 National Academy Award for 50th National exhibition of Art, Lalit Kala Akademi. 2006 Edinburgh Printmakers Visiting Artist Award, Scotland. 2002–2003 Junior Fellowship – Indian Department of Tourism & Culture. 2000-2001 Lalit Kala Akademi - Scholarship for Young Artist, India. 2000 Ovia Nunkalai Kuzhu, one man show Grant, Tamil Nadu, India. 1998 Tamil Nadu Ovia Nunkalai Kuzhu award, Chennai.India 1995 All India Crafts & Folk Festival South Zone Cultural center, at Government Museum Campus, Chennai. 1992 Certificate of merit from Government Museum, Madurai.

== Camps and workshops participated ==
2008 'mansoon artists’ camp organized by apparao gallery, chochin. 2007 All India artists’ camp organized by Lalit Kala Akademi, Lonavla. 2006 Edinburgh mela- intercontinental art camp, Edinburgh printmakers. Scotland 2003 Interactive camp with Traditional papier-Mâché Artist and contemporary Artist organized by Silparamam- and Lalit Kala Akademi, Hyderabad. 2003 Traditional Kerala Mural painting workshop organised by N.F.S.C & G.C.A.C. Chennai. 2002 Traditional & Folk painters camp, for children book Illustration organized by N.B.T& Dastkari Haat Samiti. 2000 Workshop in Print making conducted by Mr. Paul Coldwell at L.K.A. Chennai. 1997 Young artist advanced lithography camp at Lalit Kala Akademi, Chennai. 1995 All India Crafts & Folk Festival South Zone Cultural Centre, Thanjavur at Government Museum Campus, Chennai. 1991 Workshop conducted by Tamil Nadu Ovia Nunkalai Kuzhu- Kodaikanal. 1989–1991 Workshop at Government museum, Madurai.

== Sources ==
- thehindu.com
- https://web.archive.org/web/20110105114112/http://epaper.financialexpress.com/FE/FE/2011/01/02/index.shtml
- http://www.apparaogalleries.com/index.php apparao art gallery
- http://www.bindu-art.at/system/norm_layout.php?domain=1&new_lang=8 http://www.bindu-art.at/system/norm_layout.php?domain=1&new_lang=8
- http://www.eca.ac.uk/index.php?id=1132
- thehindu.com
- http://artconcerns.net/2007feb1/html/delhi_sketchbook.htm
