= All India Fine Arts and Crafts Society =

The All India Fine Arts and Crafts Society (AIFACS) is an independent arts organisation in India, founded in Delhi in 1928. In the decade after Indian independence, many of its functions were transferred to three national academies: Lalit Kala Akademi, Sangeet Natak Akademi and Sahitya Akademi for the fields of visual arts, theatre arts and literature.

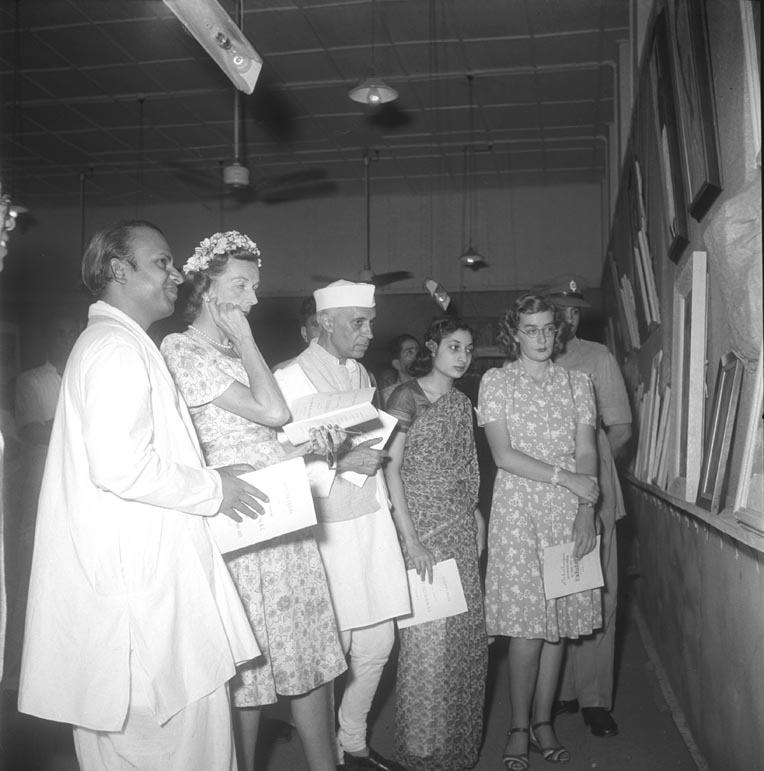
The Prime Minister Shri Jawaharlal Nehru's and Her Excellency Countess Mountbatten of Burma at the All India Fine Arts and Crafts Society's (AIFACS) Annual exhibition on 1948

AIFACS organises art exhibitions and makes awards to artists across the country. Among the most prominent artists exhibited in the 1940s were Amrita Sher-Gil, Sailoz Mookherjea and Manishi Dey. Many other followed in the long history of the AIFACS. The AIFACS Hall is located on Rafi Marg and was contracted by Sir Sobha Singh.

Its most prestigious awards include the Kala Shree, Kala Vibhushan and Kala Ratna, inaugurated in 1988. Twelve awards are given in each of these grades every three years. The highest award is the Kala Samrat.

The Society also published a newsletter several times a year, and older editions are posted on the society's website since 2010.
