= Zapurza Museum of Art & Culture =

Museum in Pune district, India

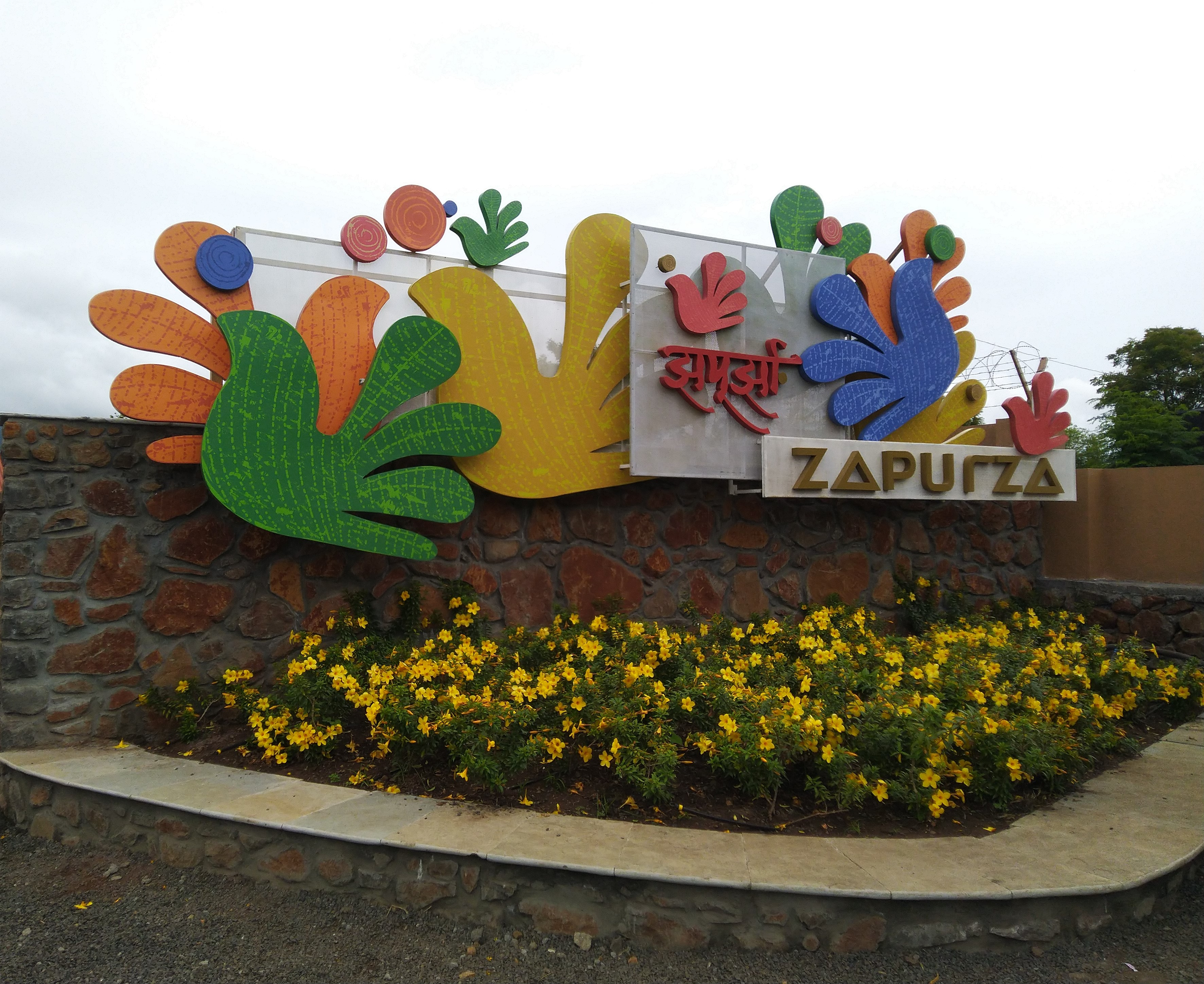
- Established: 19 May 2022
- Location: Pune district, Maharashtra, India
- Coordinates: 18.41712°N 73.73722°E
- Type: Art museum
- Website: zapurza.org

Zapurza Museum of Art & Culture is a museum in Kudje village, 25 kilometers from the city of Pune in Maharashtra, India. it opened to the public in May 2022. The museum was inaugurated by musician Hariprasad Chaurasia. The museum depicts an extensive collection of family heirloom of Maharashtra coupled with a collection of Indian painters and historic artifacts.

== History ==
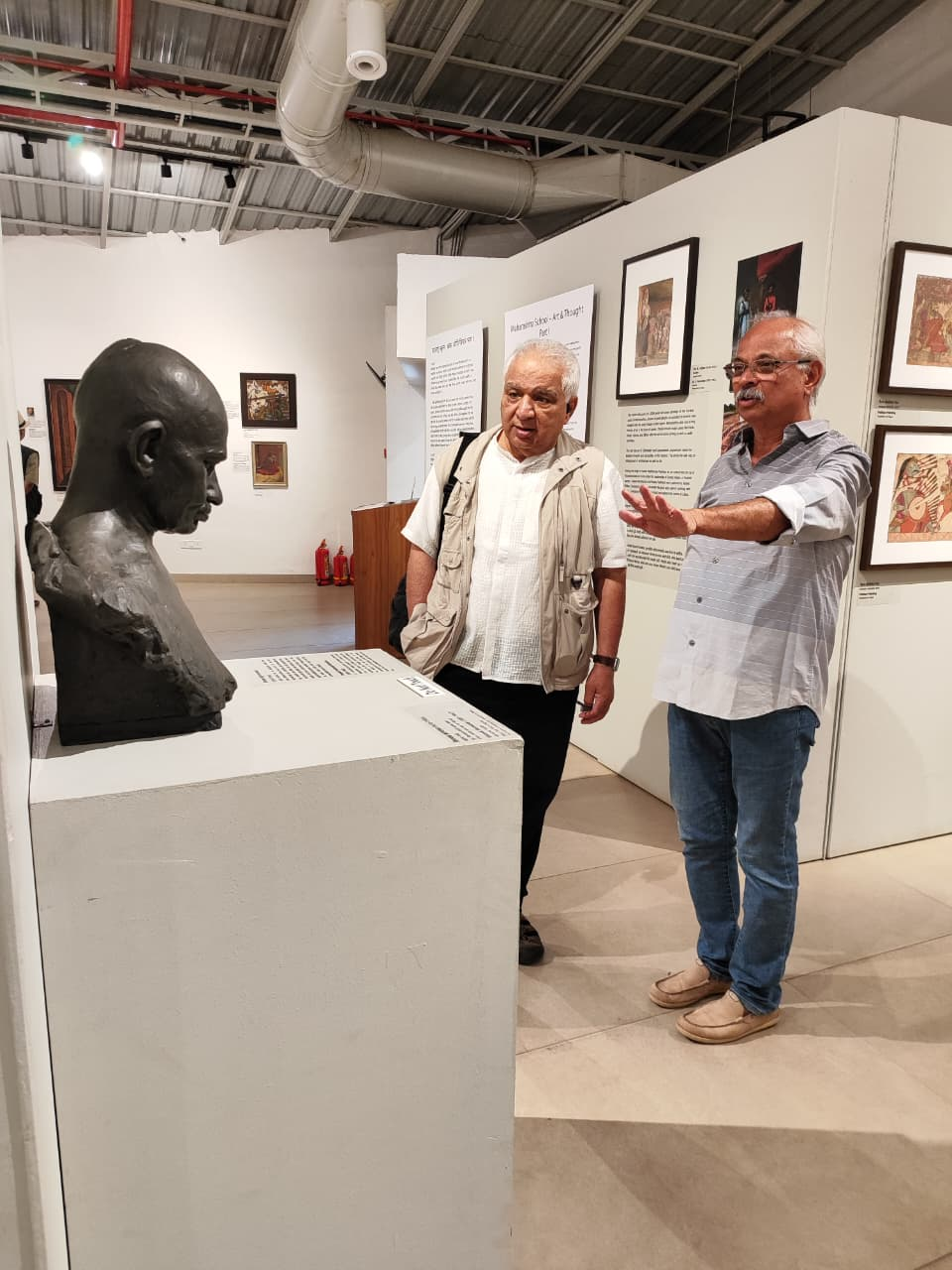
Ajit Gadgil, Founder, Zapurza Museum explaining the art.

The museum showcases the private collection of Ajit Gadgil, assembled over a span of 25 years. A sixth-generation jeweller from Pune, Gadgil often encountered customers who came to pawn family heirlooms. Appreciating the exceptional craftsmanship and historical value of these pieces, he could not bring himself to melt them down and instead began preserving the most remarkable items.

In addition to jewellery, people frequently brought paithani sarees woven with real gold zari. Typically, the process of extracting the gold involved burning the saree, but Gadgil chose not to destroy these valuable textiles and added them to his growing collection.

Over time, his interest expanded beyond jewellery to include sculptures, paintings, artefacts, textiles, lamps, prints, and silverware. Today, the collection comprises around 1,500 artifacts. Since the museum has limited display space, only about 30–35% of the collection can be exhibited at any given time, with items rotated periodically so that all pieces are eventually showcased.

== Architecture ==
The concept behind the museum was to display the tradition and culture of Maharashtra, the museum is designed by Shirish Beri, from Kolhapur along with the Dilip Joshi. The museum is situated overlooking the Khadakwasla Lake with Sinhagad Fort in the backdrop. It covers an area of 7.5- 8 acres. The campus includes ten galleries, 195 seater auditorium, amphitheater by the lake, multiple studios for various activities and a café.

During an interview Raju Sutar the museum curator said that the idea behind the museum was to make it welcoming and open to all, in contrast to an intimidating grand facade generally portrayed by the museums. The colour pallette of the museum is composed of earthy tones, by using traditional materials such as Stonemasonry, pitched roof with terracotta tiles.
