= Pestonji Bomanji =

Indian painter (1851–1938)

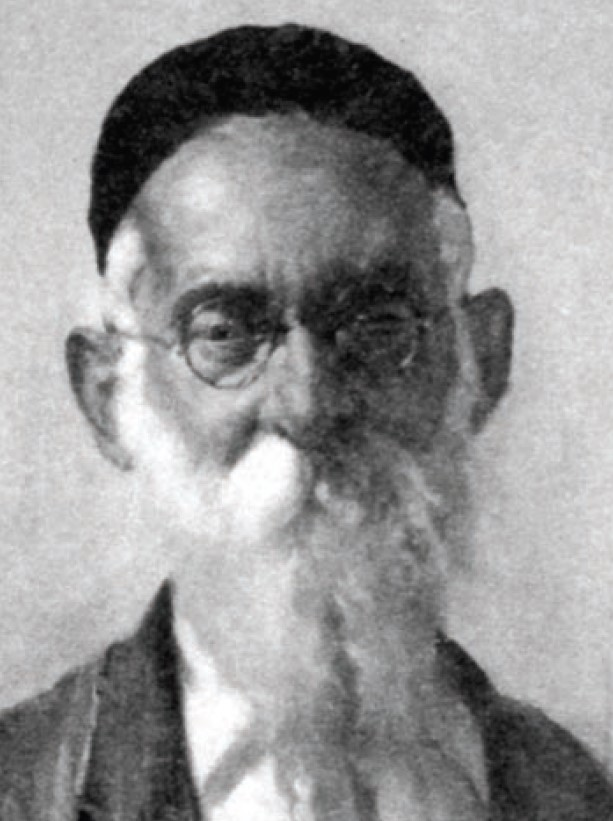
- Born: 1851
- Died: 1938 (aged 86–87)
- Education: Sir J. J. School of Art, Mumbai
- Known for: Painting

Pestonji Bomanji also known as Pestonjee Bomanjee (1851–1938) was a painter trained in the academic realist style of the Bombay School of Art.

== Biography ==
Bomanji was educated at Elphinstone High School, Bombay. He joined the newly opened J. J. School of Art, Mumbai when he was only thirteen, and studied under the principal John Griffiths. Initially, he wanted to be a sculptor and trained under John Lockwood Kipling. In 1872, Griffiths appointed him as a draughtsman on the team sent by the School to copy the paintings at the Ajanta Caves. He headed the team in 1880. In 1894, he became one of the first Indian teachers at the J.J. School and later also served briefly as its first Indian vice-principal.

A brief apprenticeship under the painter Valentine Cameron Prinsep in 1877 drew him towards portraiture. He established a successful practice portraying members of the wealthy Parsi community to which he belonged. His approach was realistic and unglamourized. Described as 'realistic and warty' by the Times of India, his portraits and other paintings were also compared to the work of Dutch realists.

Bomanji's Parsi heritage is reflected in the depictions of daily and religious life seen in works such as Feeding the Parrot and The Parsi Fire Ceremony. He exhibited at shows around the country. His Parsi Tiger Slayer was deemed the best work by a 'native artist' at the 1889 exhibition of the Bombay Art Society. Notably, his frequent portrayal of real Parsi women in his portraits highlights their prominent visibility within his work. This emphasis underscores the progressive role Parsi women played, as they were among the earliest from any Indian community to participate actively in public life and social reform movements. He won the Governor's Gold Medal at Chennai, Pune and Kolkata, as well as a cash prize of Rs 500 at the 1883 International Exhibition at Kolkata for his Parsi Lady Sewing.

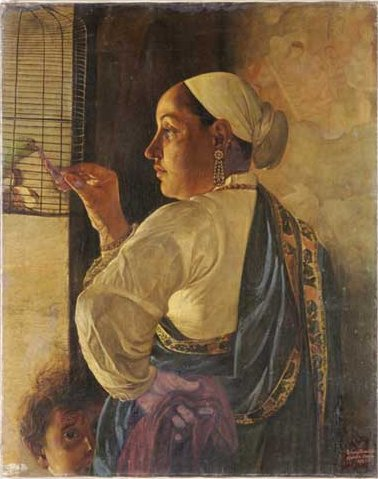
Feeding the Parrot by Pestonji Bomanji

Pestonji Bomanji's son Eruchshaw Pestonji was also an academic painter whose works are in the collection of the National Gallery of Modern Art, New Delhi.
