= Krishna Reddy (artist) =

Indian master-printmaker and sculptor (1925-2018)

- Born: 15 July 1925; Nandanoor, Chittoor district, Madras Presidency, British India
- Died: 22 August 2018 (aged 93); New York, U.S.
- Other names: N. Krishna Reddy
- Education: Slade School of Fine Arts
- Alma mater: Kala Bhavana
- Known for: Printmaking, Sculpture
- Spouse: Judy Blum Reddy

Krishna Reddy (15 July 1925 – 22 August 2018) was an Indian master printmaker, sculptor, and teacher. He was considered a master intaglio printer and known for viscosity printing.

== Early life and education ==
Krishna Reddy was born on 15 July 1925, in a small village called Nandanoor, near Chittoor, Andhra Pradesh, in India. His father was an agricultural worker, who also painted murals in temples.

Reddy studied at Visva-Bharati University's Kala Bhavana (Institute of Fine Arts) with Nandalal Bose, from 1941 to 1946, and graduated with a degree in fine arts. From 1947 to 1949, he was head of the art section at Kalakshetra Foundation and was also teaching art at the Montessori Teachers' Training Centre in Madras. It was at this time that he took interest in sculpture and painting.

In 1949, he moved to London, and continued his sculpture studies with Henry Moore at the University of London's Slade School of Fine Arts. In 1950, Reddy moved to Paris and met artist Constantin Brâncuși. Through Brâncuși, he was introduced to cafe discussions on art and met many famous artists during studio visits. During his time in Paris he studied sculpture under Ossip Zadkine and engraving under Stanley William Hayter.

In 1957, he traveled to Academia Di Belle Arti Di Brera (Brera Academy) in Milan to study under Marino Marini. In 2016 he was one of the subjects of the exhibition Workshop and Legacy: Stanley William Hayter, Krishna Reddy, Zarina Hashmi at the Metropolitan Museum of Art. His work may be found in the permanent collection of the National Gallery of Art in Washington, DC.

== Career ==
=== Printmaking ===
Reddy was considered a master in intaglio printmaking and after 1965 was an associate director at Hayter's Atelier 17. Atelier 17, a thriving artist workshop was founded in 1927 by Hayter and was originally located in Paris; however between 1939 and 1940 the workshop moved to New York City and in 1950 back to Paris. Atelier 17 has always been a meeting place to experiment with their art practices for both European and American artists including Joan Miró, Pablo Picasso, Alberto Giacometti, Juan Cárdenas, Constantin Brâncuși, and Zarina Hashmi.

Reddy's technique and style distinguished him as an important printmaker. Reddy's prints are abstract, created with subtle grid-like designs on plates with intricate texturisations. The myriad complex colours that he introduced in prints are marked by a contemplative approach to the infinite mysteries of nature. While working at Atelier 17, Reddy was instrumental in developing a new printing process to produce multi-coloured prints from a single printing matrix by exploiting the viscosity and tackiness of the inks, subsequently named viscosity printing. Reddy would later teach the viscosity etching technique at Robert Blackburn's Printmaking Workshop in New York.

Reddy received the Padma Shri award in 1972, in recognition of his distinguished contributions to art.

=== Teaching ===
Reddy was a guest professor and lecturer at many universities in the United States including Maryland Institute College of Art, Pratt Institute, Ruskin College School of Fine Art and Drawing, University of Texas and many more.

Among Reddy's pupils are the artists Kathleen Mary Spagnolo and Elaine Breiger.

Reddy died on 22 August 2018 in New York, at the age of 93.
