= John Griffiths (artist) =

Welsh artist (1837–1918)

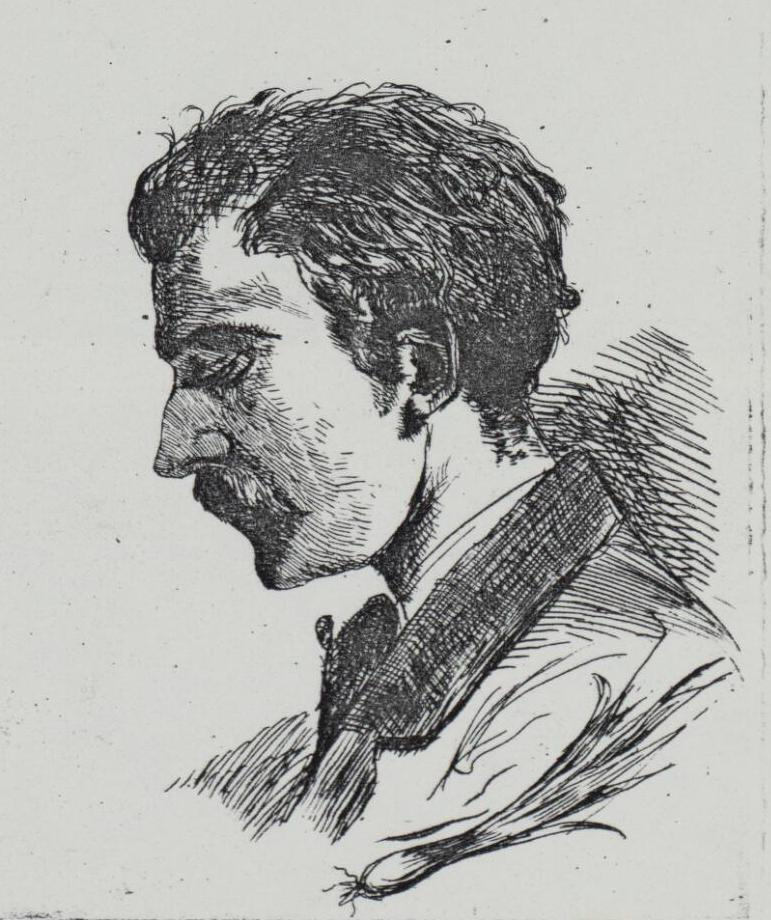
- A portrait from the Welsh Portrait Collection at the National Library of Wales.
- Born: 29 November 1837; Llanfair Caereinion, Wales
- Died: 1 December 1918 (aged 81)
- Education: Royal College of Art
- Known for: Painter, teacher
- Movement: Orientalist

John Griffiths (29 November 1837 – 1 December 1918) was a Welsh artist who worked in India, noted for his Orientalist works.

== Life and career ==
He was born in Llanfair Caereinion, Montgomeryshire, on 29 November 1837, son of Evan Griffiths and his wife Mary Evans of Machynlleth; on his father's death, his mother became housekeeper to Sir James Clark, physician to Queen Victoria. The boy was brought up by his uncle Richard Griffiths, of Neuadd Uchaf farm, Llanfair. Noting his artistic leanings, Sir James had him trained at what is now the Royal College of Art. He then worked at the South Kensington museum, now the V&A, and was engaged in decorating its buildings. He became a professor of art and moved to Bombay in 1865 as the principal of the Sir Jamsetjee Jeejebhoy School of Art in Bombay. His chief associate and friend there, was John Lockwood Kipling, father of Rudyard Kipling (Griffiths was a godfather to Rudyard). It was under Griffiths's superintendence that much of the decoration of the new public buildings of Bombay was designed. Griffiths undertook many commissions, including work on the Victoria Terminus and the High Court. After his decade in Bombay, Griffiths was appointed Principal of the Mayo School of Art and Curator of the Museum in Lahore, now in Pakistan.

One of his major works was the copying of paintings in the Buddhist temples at Ajanta which were published in two large folio volumes "The paintings in the Buddhist Cave Temples at Ajanta".

He retired in 1895, and moved to Manafon, Montgomeryshire and later to Norton, Sherborne, Dorset where he lived until his death on 1 December 1918. He was married in Bombay to Linette Rebecca Beddome Davis and had two daughters, Helen Margaret Griffiths, and Gladys Linette Myfanwy Griffiths.

== See also ==
- List of Orientalist artists
- Orientalism
