= Artistic depictions of the Partition of India =

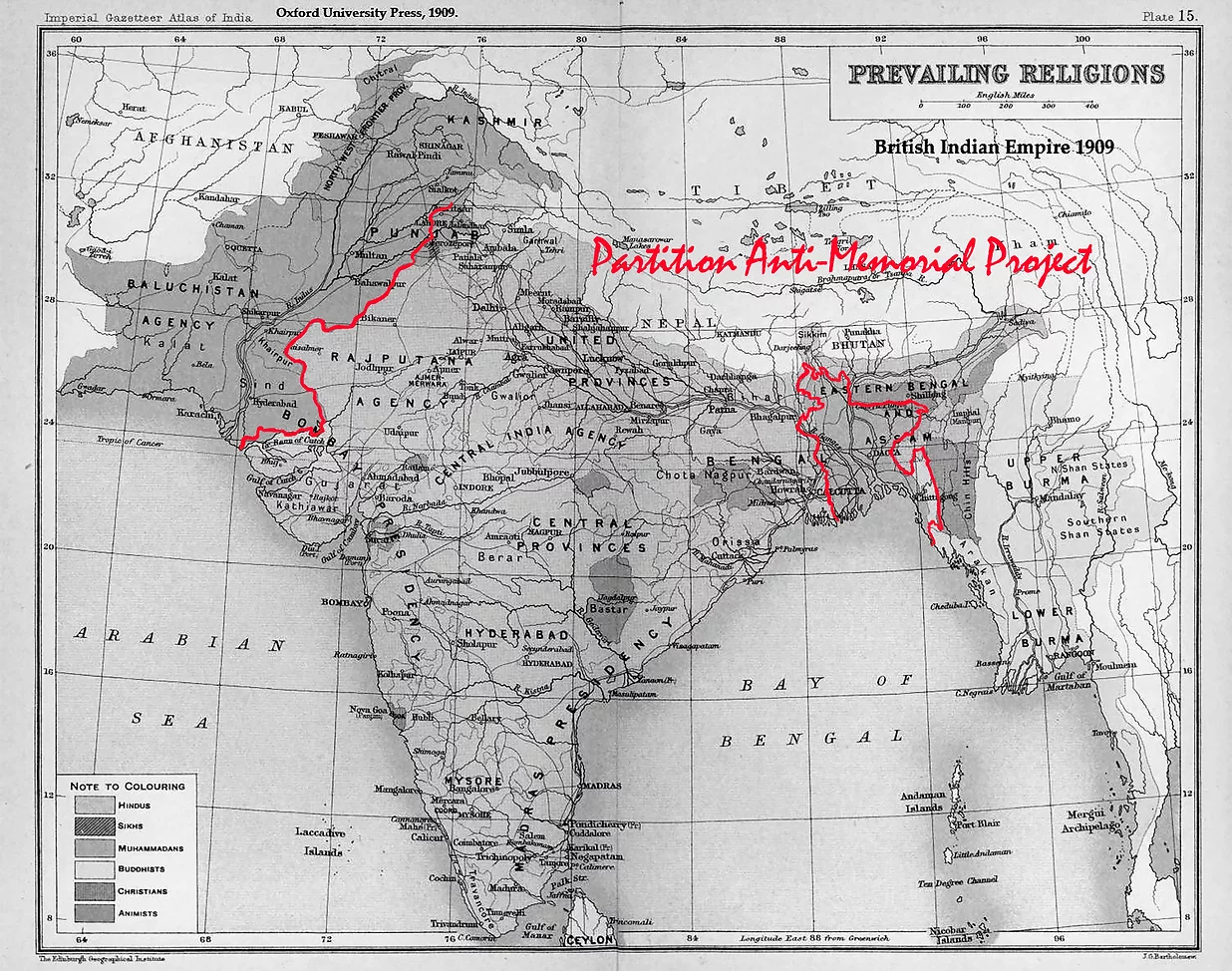
The Partition Anti-Memorial Project by Pritika Chowdhry commemorates the Partition of India.

The Partition of India and the associated bloody riots inspired many creative minds in the republics of India, Pakistan, and Bangladesh to create literary/cinematic depictions of this event. While some creations depicted the massacres during the refugee migration, others concentrated on the aftermath of the partition in terms of difficulties faced by the refugees in both side of the border. Even now, more than 60 years after the partition, works of fiction and films are made that relate to the events of partition. W.H. Auden in his poem "Partition" showed the dilemmas of Cyril John Radcliffe, 1st Viscount Radcliffe, responsible for deciding which parts of India went where.

Literature describing the human cost of independence and partition comprises Khushwant Singh's Train to Pakistan (1956), several short stories such as Toba Tek Singh (1955) by Saadat Hassan Manto, Urdu poems such as Subh-e-Azadi (Freedom's Dawn, 1947) by Faiz Ahmad Faiz, Bhisham Sahni's Tamas (1974), Manohar Malgonkar's A Bend in the Ganges (1965), and Bapsi Sidhwa's Ice-Candy Man (1988), among others. Salman Rushdie's novel Midnight's Children (1980), which won the Booker Prize and the Booker of Bookers, weaved its narrative based on the children born with magical abilities on midnight of 14 August 1947. Freedom at Midnight (1975) is a non-fiction work by Larry Collins and Dominique Lapierre that chronicled the events surrounding the first Independence Day celebrations in 1947. There is a paucity of films related to the independence and partition. Early films relating to the circumstances of the independence, partition and the aftermath include Nemai Ghosh's Chinnamul (1950), Dharmputra (1961), Ritwik Ghatak's Meghe Dhaka Tara (1960), Komal Gandhar (1961), Subarnarekha (1962); later films include Garm Hava (1973) and Tamas (1987). From the late 1990s onwards, more films on this theme were made, including several mainstream films, such as Earth (1998), Train to Pakistan (1998) (based on the aforementioned book), Hey Ram (2000), Gadar: Ek Prem Katha (2001), Pinjar (2003), Partition (2007) and Madrasapattinam (2010),. The biopics Gandhi (1982), Jinnah (1998) and Sardar (1993) also feature independence and partition as significant events in their screenplay.

Some of the books and films are discussed here. However, the list is far from being exhaustive.

== Fiction ==
=== Ordered by date of publication ===
- Hyder, Qurratulain, Aag Ka Darya (River of Fire) (1959). Translated into English by the author in 1998. Reprint 2019 by New Directions. "River of Fire tells a completist and syncretistic version of 2,500 years of history in modern-day India, Pakistan, and Bangladesh—beginning with the Nanda Dynasty on the brink of defeat by the founder of the Mauryan Empire (323 to 185 BCE), and ending in post-Partition despair."
- Rushdie, Salman, Midnight's Children (1980). New York: Knopf, 1981; ISBN 0-394-51470-X.
- Manto, Saadat Hasan, Kingdom's End and Other Stories (1987). Penguin Books India. ISBN 0-14-011774-1. The majority of stories by this Punjabi writer revolve around the end of the Raj, Partition and communalism.
- Sahni, Bhisham, Tamas (1987). Penguin Books India. ISBN 0-14-011477-7
- Sidhwa, Bapsi, Ice-Candy Man (1989) ISBN 0-14-011767-9 later published as Cracking India (1991). ISBN 0-915943-56-5
- Singh, Khushwant, Train to Pakistan (1990). Grove Press; ISBN 0-8021-3221-9
- Lahiri, Jhumpa, Interpreter of Maladies (1999). Mariner Books/Houghton Mifflin. ISBN 0-395-92720-X
- Baldwin, Shauna Singh, What the Body Remembers (2001). Anchor: ISBN 0-385-49605-2
- Mistry, Rohinton, A Fine Balance (2001). Random House ISBN 1-4000-3065-X (though this book is set in 1975 Partition plays a dominant role in the narrative)

=== Hoshyarpur to Lahore ===
Entitled Hoshyar Pur say Lahore tak in Urdu, it is a true story based on a train journey from Indian city of Hoshiarpur to Lahore in Pakistan. It is written by a Police officer who traveled in this train.

=== This is Not That Dawn (Jhoota Sach) ===
Reviving life in Lahore as it was before 1947, the book opens with characters like Tara, who wanted an education above marriage; Puri, whose ideology and principles often came in the way of his impoverished circumstances; Asad, who was ready to sacrifice his love for the sake of communal harmony. Published in English translation for the first time, Yashpal's novel is a tale of human suffering.

=== Ali Pur Ka Aeeli ===
Ali Pur Ka Aeeli in Urdu is an autobiography of Mumtaz Mufti that includes his narration on the account of bringing his family from Batala to Lahore on a truck.

=== Khaak aur Khoon ===
Khak aur Khoon is a historical novel by Naseem Hijazi that describes the sacrifices of Muslims of the sub-continent during the time of partition in 1947.

When a portion of the Muslims from the various regions of India were trying to get to Pakistan, some faced attacks from Hindu and Sikh groups, during their journeys, that involved snatching of money, and jewellery of their wives and daughters.

=== The Broken Mirror ===
The Broken Mirror, a Hindi novel by Krishna Baldev Vaid, portrays the psychological and sociological transformations in a West Punjabi village in the phase leading up to the Partition, with emphasis on commensal taboos and hardened community boundaries.

=== Half a Village (Aadha Gaon) ===
Half a Village, a Hindi novel by Rahi Masoom Reza, represents the experiences of subaltern Indian Muslims in village Gangauli, and their distinctive take on the vacuity of 'high politics'.

=== The Weary Generations ===
The Weary Generations, an Urdu novel by Abdullah Hussein, tracks the prehistory of the partition through the experiences of the main character, Naeem, a veteran of the First World War who faces up to the futility and meaningless of the partition.

=== Basti ===
Basti by Intizar Hussain is an Urdu novel that focuses on the partition as memory, through the lens of protagonist Zakir, a historian who seeks to come to terms with this memory in the context of the happenings in 1971 in Pakistan leading up to the formation of Bangladesh.

=== The Dark Dancer ===
The Dark Dancer is a novel by Balachandra Rajan that portrays the experiences of an Indian educated abroad who returns home to face the horror of the Partition.

=== A Bend in the Ganges ===
A Bend in the Ganges is a novel by Manohar Malgonkar that features some of the graphic violence that occurred during the partition.

=== Sunlight on a Broken Column ===
Sunlight on a Broken Column is a novel by Attia Hosain which depicts the experiences of the protagonist, Laila, a young woman from a taluqdari family of Oudh, in the years leading up to the partition.

=== Pinjar ===
Pinjar is a Punjabi novel written by Amrita Pritam which is the story of a Hindu Girl who was kidnapped by a Muslim young man who married her. At the time of partition that girl again got chance to go to her family and re-unite which she refuses as she starts loving her husband. A film based on the novel was released in 2003 while the TV series adapted from the novel was broadcast on TVOne Pakistan in 2018.

=== Bano ===
Bano is an Urdu novel by Razia Butt which is the story of a Muslim family in Ludhyiana (located in undivided Punjab) and two lovers Hassan and Bano who got separated during partition. The heart breaking story of the partition of India further continues after the independence of Pakistan. Later, the novel was also adapted into a TV series which broadcast on Hum TV (Pakistan) in 2010.

=== Kingdom's End and Other Stories ===
Kingdom's End and Other Stories (1987) is a collection of stories written by Saadat Hasan Manto, published by Penguin Books India (ISBN 0-14-011774-1). The majority of stories by this Urdu writer from Punjab revolve around the end of the Raj, Partition and communalism. His stories include Thanda Gosht, Khol Do, Toba Tek Singh, Iss Manjdhar Mein, Mozalle, Babu Gopi Nath etc. Some of his characters became legendary. An online translation of Toba Tek Singh is available. "Toba Tek Singh" was the basis for Ken McMullen's 1987 film Partition.

=== Raavi Paar and Other Stories ===
Raavi Paar and Other Stories (2000) is a collection of stories by Sampooran Singh Gulzar that deal with the partition of India and Pakistan. The book was published by HarperCollins Publishers India ISBN 81-7223-275-6.

=== Sacred Games ===
While Vikram Chandra's 2006 novel Sacred Games is not about partition, it does contain a long and graphic chapter describing the main character's mother's flight as a young Sikh girl from what would become Pakistani Punjab, during which her beloved older sister was abducted.

=== Train to Pakistan ===
This saga by Khushwant Singh was first published in 1956. Singh's version of the Partition is a social one, providing human accounts in a diverse, detailed character base where each person has unique points of view, pointing out that everyone is equally at fault and that placing blame was irrelevant. Interwoven with this point are the subtle questions of morality which Singh asks through his characters, such as whether or not the bad needs to be recognized to promote the good, and what constitutes a good deed. It was adapted into a Hindi film by the same name by Pamela Rooks in 1998.

Train to Pakistan (1990). Grove Press; ISBN 0-8021-3221-9.

=== Tamas ===
Penned by Bhisham Sahni and the winner of the Sahitya Akademi Award in 1975, Tamas depicted riots in a small town at the time of the partition of India in 1947, which Sahni witnessed at Rawalpindi. The novel was later adapted into a TV series by the same name for Doordarshan, and later a one-off four-hour feature film. Tamas – Rajkamal Prakashan Pvt. Ltd.. ISBN 978-81-267-1539-8.

=== Midnight's Children ===
Salman Rushdie wrote this famous surrealistic fiction full of satirical references to the event of partition and independence. The "midnight" alluded to in the title is the moment at which partition and independence became official. It was later adapted into a film by the same name by Deepa Mehta.

Midnight's Children (1980). New York: Knopf, 1981; ISBN 0-394-51470-X.

=== Purbo-Paschim ===
Purbo-Paschim (East and the West) is an epic Bengali saga by Sunil Gangopadhyay. The narrative deals with a particular family that had to migrate from East Pakistan to West Bengal, and their fight against the tide. The story stretches from a pre-independence period to early 1980s and reflects the socio-economical changes that this region went through during this long period of time.

=== A Fine Balance ===
Written by Rohinton Mistry, the story is set in 1975. However, the Partition plays a dominant role in the narrative.

A Fine Balance (2001). Random House ISBN 1-4000-3065-X

=== Ice-Candy Man ===
Bapsi Sidhwa's 1989 novel Ice-Candy Man, written in the backdrop of the riots in Lahore, was re-released in 1991 as Cracking India. Later the story was made into a film, called Earth by Deepa Mehta.

=== Interpreter of Maladies ===
Jhumpa Lahiri was awarded the 2000 Pulitzer Prize for Fiction for Interpreter of Maladies, a collection of short stories some of which involved the aftermath of the partition.

Interpreter of Maladies (1999). Mariner Books/Houghton Mifflin. ISBN 0-395-92720-X

=== Kitne Pakistan ===
Kitne Pakistan (How Many Pakistan?) 2000 Hindi novel by Kamleshwar, noted 20th-century Hindi writer, a pioneer of the Nayi Kahani i ("New Story") movement of the 1950s, deals with historical context on the based on the rise of communalism, the violence and bloodshed in aftermath of partition of India in 1947 and examines the nature and futility of divisive politics and religion.

=== Azadi ===
Semi-autobiographical novel by Chaman Nahal.

Azadi (Freedom). New Delhi, Arnold-Heinemann, and Boston, Houghton Mifflin, 1975; London, Deutsch, 1977 ISBN 9780395194010.

=== The Shadow Lines ===
The Shadow Lines is a novel by Amitav Ghosh. It is a non-linear narrative that covers several crucial periods in the history of India, Bangladesh, and Pakistan. It explored the themes of violence, memory, loss, and of the 'grand narratives' propagated by those in power, as opposed to the more individual and personal 'little narratives' seen through its central characters, Thamma, Tridib, and the unnamed narrator.

=== Aangan ===
Aangan is an Urdu-language award winning novel by Khadija Mastoor. Aangan means Courtyard, thus as the name represents it deals with the events of life inside the house walls at the time of partition and depicts the stories of its characters Chammi, Aaliya, Tehmina and Salma from Aaliya's perspective. The novel was also adapted into a TV series with the same name by Hum TV (Pakistan).

== Plays ==
Drawing the Line is a 2013 play by Howard Brenton, centred on Cyril Radcliffe and his part in the partition of India in 1947. It premiered from 3 December 2013 to 11 January 2014, in a production directed by Howard Davies at London's Hampstead Theatre.

== Feature films ==
=== Films ordered by release date ===
- Meghe Dhaka Tara, directed by Ritwik Ghatak (1960)
- Garam Hawa, directed by M. S. Sathyu (1973)
- Partition, directed by Ken McMullen, adapted from Saadat Hasan Manto's story Toba Tek Singh, by Tariq Ali (1978)
- Earth, directed by Deepa Mehta (1998)
- Jinnah, directed by Jamil Dehlavi (1998)
- Hey Ram directed by Kamal Haasan (2000)
- Gadar: Ek Prem Katha, directed by Anil Sharma (2001)
- Kaalapaani, directed by Priyadarshan (1996)
- Partition, directed by Vic Sarin (2007)

=== Garam Hawa ===
Directed by M. S. Sathyu, Garam Hawa (1973) was Balraj Sahni's last major role.

=== Meghe Dhaka Tara (The Cloud-Capped Star) ===
Directed by Ritwik Ghatak, Meghe Dhaka Tara (1960), never explicitly mentions the Partition, but takes place in a refugee camp in the outskirts of Calcutta, and concerns an impoverished genteel Hindu bhadralok family and the problems they face because of Partition.

=== Komal Gandhar (E Flat) ===
Directed by Ritwik Ghatak Komal Gandhar (1961), the protagonists suffer from the same anguish: the separation from their home, on the other side of the border.

=== Dharmputra ===
It was first Hindi film to depict the partition of India, and Hindu fundamentalism, Dharmputra (1961) directed by Yash Chopra, two years after he made his debut with Dhool Ka Phool (1959), steeped in Nehruvian secularism, wherein a Muslim brings up an 'illegitimate' Hindu child and featured classic song, Tu Hindu banega na Musalman banega, insaan ki aulaad hai, insaan banega, the theme was reverse in this film as herein a Hindu family brings an illegitimate Muslim child, who grows up to become a Hindu fundamentalist. The film was critically acclaimed, and won the 9th National Film Award for Best Feature Film in Hindi., however its release saw near riots at the theatre, discouraging other Hindi film directors from approaching the theme for another decade, although subtly.

=== Earth ===
Directed by Deepa Mehta, Earth (1998), an India/Canada co-production, is a thoughtful examination of a circle of friends and acquaintances affected by the Partition. A scoundrel uses communal violence as an excuse for retaliation against a romantic rival. The film is based on Bapsi Sidhwa's Cracking India; Sidhwa co-wrote the screenplay with Mehta. Contains brutal scenes of communal carnage.

=== Hey Ram ===
Kamal Haasan wrote, directed, and starred in Hey Ram (2000) film about the Partition and the assassination of Gandhi. The story follows the life of a south Indian Brahmin man caught up in the madness surrounding the direct action day in Calcutta and the subsequent events culminating in the assassination of Gandhi. It portrays the greatness of M.K. Gandhi in a telling way and also shows how even educated men acted mad out of grief and rage during the partition. The screenplay touches on many things that are common to the modern nations of India and Pakistan, starting from the Indus valley civilisation.

=== Gadar: Ek Prem Katha ===
Directed by Anil Sharma, Gadar: Ek Prem Katha (2001), is an Indian movie about the Partition; notable for shocking scenes of riot and massacre of Hindus and Sikhs being killed in the famous scene of train full of dead bodies of Hindu and Sikh people escaping from Pakistan. The train was marked by Pakistani mobs by writing "Ajadi Ka Tohfa," that translates as "Gift of Independence" on it. In the movie the trains that came from Pakistan had another sentence written on them, which translates as "Indians! learn cutting from us." It was a major hit.

=== Khamosh Paani (Silent Waters) ===
Directed by Sabiha Sumar, Khamosh Pani (Silent Waters) (2003), depicts the partition ironically and shows the situation of Jihadis in 1979 Pakistan.

=== Pinjar ===
Pinjar was a 2003 film, adapted from the novel by same name by Amrita Pritam, and had Urmila Matondkar in the role of the protagonist, Puro.

=== Partition ===
Directed by Vic Sarin Partition, is a Canada/UK/South Africa co-production. A retired Sikh military officer (played by Jimi Mistry) helps and falls in love with a Muslim teenaged girl (played by Kristin Kreuk).

=== Tamas ===
Based on author, Bhisham Sahni's acclaimed Hindi novel, Tamas (1987) depicted the makings of riots in a small Indian town, and its aftermath, first shown adapted into a TV series by Govind Nihalani for Doordarshan, and later shown as a one-off four-hour feature film.

=== Gandhi ===
Richard Attenborough's film on Gandhi's life has several scenes dealing with the lead up to partition, the violence, and Gandhi's reaction. The movie won 8 Academy Awards

=== Jinnah ===
Jamil Dehlavi's film on Jinnah's life has several scenes dealing with the lead up to partition, the violence, and Jinnah's reaction.

=== The Sky Below ===
A feature-length award-winning documentary by Sarah Singh which explores the history and current climate on both sides of the Indo-Pakistani divide (2007).

== Art ==
The early members of the Bombay Progressive Artist's Group cite the Partition of India as a key reason for its founding in December 1947. Those members included F. N. Souza, M. F. Husain, S. H. Raza, S. K. Bakre, H. A. Gade, and K. H. Ara, who went on to become some of the most important and influential Indian artists of the 20th century.

Contemporary Indian artists that have made significant artworks about the Partition are Nalini Malani, Anjolie Ela Menon, Satish Gujral, Nilima Sheikh, Arpita Singh, Krishen Khanna, Pran Nath Mago, S. L. Parasher, Arpana Caur, Tayeba Begum Lipi, Mahbubur Rahman, Promotesh D Pulak, and Pritika Chowdhry.

Project Dastaan is a peace-building initiative that reconnects displaced refugees of the 1947 Partition of India, Pakistan and Bangladesh with their childhood communities and villages through virtual reality digital experiences.

The Partition Museum is a public museum located in the town hall in Amritsar, India. The museum aims to become the central repository of stories, materials, and documents related to the post-partition riots that followed the division of British India into two independent countries: India and Pakistan. The museum was inaugurated on 25 August 2017.

The 1947 Partition Archive is a non-profit non-governmental organization dedicated to institutionalizing the people's history of Partition through documenting, preserving and sharing eye witness accounts from all ethnic, religious and economic communities affected by the Partition of British India in 1947.

== Advertisements ==
The 2013 Google India advertisement Reunion (about the Partition of India) has had a strong impact in both India and Pakistan, leading to hope for the easing of travel restrictions between the two countries. It went viral and was viewed more than 1.6 million times before officially debuting on television on 15 November 2013.

== Television ==
- "Demons of the Punjab", the sixth episode of the eleventh series of the BBC science-fiction series Doctor Who in 2018 deals with how series companion Yasmin Khan learns about her family heritage and how it was affected by the sectarian violence unleashed by the Partition.
- Lajwanti by Rajinder singh Bedi was a daily soap on Zee TV.
- Dastaan by Samira Fazal was a series on Hum TV that follows the story of Bano and her trials and tribulations in migrating from India to Pakistan
- The Disney+ and Marvel Cinematic Universe television series Ms. Marvel (2022) depicts a historical fiction version of a Muslim family, the maternal grandmother and maternal great-grandparents of Kamala Khan fleeing to Pakistan during the partition. However, Khan's great-grandmother, Aisha, who is from an alternate dimension, is killed by her former ally and fellow inhabitant of the alternate dimension, while her grandmother and great-grandfather manage to make it to Pakistan alive.
- Kyun Utthe Dil Chhod Aaye was a daily soap on Sony TV. Set in 1947 Lahore, the show is a period drama that revolves around three young girls Amrit, Vashma and Radha.
- Freedom at Midnight (2024), a historical drama series produced by SonyLIV depicts events leading to the partition.

== See also ==
- The 1947 Partition Archive
- Opposition to the partition of India

== General and cited sources ==
- Roy, Pinaki (July–December 2010). "Hearts Divided: Anglo-Indian Writers and the Partition". Exploring History 1.1: 54–61. ISSN 2230-8490.
- Roy, Pinaki, and Ashim kumar Sarkar, eds. (2016). The Broken Pens: The (Indian) Partition in Literature and Films. Jaipur: Aadi Publications. ISBN 978-93-82630-75-3.
