= Krishen Khanna =

Indian artist (born 1925)

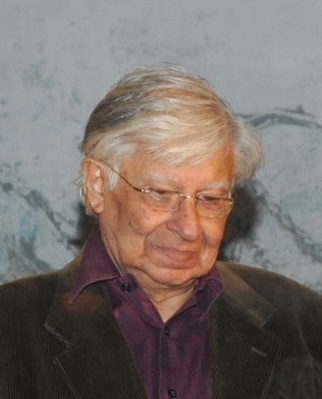
- Khanna in 2011
- Born: 5 July 1925 (age 101); Lyallpur, Punjab Province (now in Pakistan)
- Education: Government College, Lahore
- Known for: Painting
- Notable work: News of Gandhiji's Death; Truckwallahs series Bandwallahs series
- Movement: Bombay Progressive Artists' Group
- Awards: Padma Bhushan (2011); Padma Shri (1990)

Krishen Khanna (born 5 July 1925) is an Indian painter known for his abstracted figurative artworks depicting street scenes of the country. He is a self-taught artist whose paintings showcase Indian idioms and human values. Notable works by Khanna include the Truckwallahs and Bandwallahs series as well as his paintings on Christian themes.

Khanna attended Imperial Service College in England and the Government College, Lahore. He then worked at Grindlay's Bank in Mumbai and became a member of the Progressive Artists' Group. Khanna quit his banking job in 1961 to pursue art full-time. Khanna is a recipient of the Rockefeller Fellowship in 1962, the Padma Shri in 1990, and the Padma Bhushan in 2011. He lives and works in New Delhi.

== Early life and education ==
Khanna was born on 5 July 1925 in Lyallpur (now Faisalabad, Pakistan). When he was two years old, his family moved to Lahore. His early studies began at the Sacred Heart High School in the city. His father Kahan Chand Khanna was a teacher in an intermediate college. In 1930, his father traveled to England to pursue his doctorate. On his return to Lahore, he brought copies of Leonardo da Vinci's Self Portrait and The Last Supper. Young Krishen was delighted to see these creations which left a lasting impression of art on him.

Khanna's family moved to Multan in 1936. He received the Rudyard Kipling Scholarship in 1938 at the age of 13 and travelled from Bombay to Britain on RMS Strathmore. Through this scholarship he was admitted to the Imperial Service College in England where he studied art for the first time. During the Second World War in 1942, Krishna Khanna passed the examination from Oxford and Cambridge School of Certificate with a subject in arts. In 1944, the Khanna family moved to Lahore from where he completed his B. A. honours in English literature from the Government College. The year 1946 was an important moment in his life when he enrolled in Sheikh Ahmed's studio to study drawing and also started working in Kapoor Art Works. Here, he learned the technique of painting as well as printing. Khanna earned Rs 350 every month in this job. With his first salary he had bought a work by Prannath Mago and thus began his life as an artist. In the same year, he participated in the annual exhibition of Punjab Art Society wherein his work Dead Tree was highly appreciated.

The years that followed were quite challenging. There was chaos in the country due to communal riots. It became clear for the Khanna family that it would not be possible to stay in Lahore under those circumstances. On 12 August 1947, the family of five members came to India in a car leaving their home behind and migrated to Shimla.

== Career ==
In India, a settled life for Khanna began in 1948 when he was appointed as an officer in Grindlay's Bank, Mumbai. This job was a sigh of relief for his family as it helped them to sustain themselves. During his time in Mumbai, Khanna met S. B. Palsikar who soon became his close friend. During the exhibition at Bombay Art Gallery, Khanna met F. N. Souza which turned into a lasting friendship. This was followed by close acquaintance with the remaining members of the Progressive Artists' Group – M. F. Husain, H. A. Gade, S. H. Raza, K. H. Ara, and Sadanand Bakre. His work News of Gandhi's Death was displayed in the Golden Jubilee Exhibition of the Bombay Art Society at the Cowasji Jehangir Hall, which was highly praised. This painting depicted Hindus and Muslims reading a newspaper story of Mahatma Gandhi's assassination standing around a traffic island in Delhi. The famous art critic of the time, Rudolf von Leyden wrote extensively about this work by Khanna and said that he would become one of the best artists of India. In this way his life got back on track, but the pressure of the job continued to be there.

Khanna's first painting was sold in the late 1940s for Rs 225 to Dr. Homi Bhabha who was then collecting works for the Tata Institute of Fundamental Research. Titled Spring Nude, the painting was sold by M. F. Husain with whom Khanna had left the painting before the latter had departed from Mumbai. In 1953, Khanna was transferred to Madras. Here he composed works of the Musician series, inspired by Carnatic music and Bharatanatyam. In 1955, Khanna held his first solo show in Madras. He worked at the bank till 1961 when he resigned to devote himself to art full time. He was awarded the Rockefeller Fellowship in 1962 and was an artist-in-residence at the American University in Washington in 1963–64. For a few years, Khanna was a lecturer on art at the Jawaharlal Nehru University in New Delhi. In 1968, he was appointed the honorary director of the Triennial cell at the Lalit Kala Akademi. Here, he was of the opinion that art is not a horse race and the awards should be awarded based on the quality of the body of work, as the work is what establishes the artist.

One of his paintings titled The Last Supper, was sold for $1.13 million (Rs. 10.22 Cr) at AstaGuru's auction in Mumbai.

=== Style ===
The early phase of Khanna's artistic style is known for its figurative works which depicted the life and inhabitants of southern India. Subsequently, his works evolved into poetic abstraction, similar to that of Rothko's expressionism. He later returned to figurative painting, that were rooted in portrayal of social realities derived from photographs. The portrayal of good and evil along with the emotion of pity in his painting placed him close to his expressionist contemporaries. While moulding his art in new dimensions using oil colours, he also used acrylic colours and made drawings with ink, pencil etc. When Khanna lived in Washington, D.C. and New York City (1964–65), he experimented with pure abstraction and different methods of painting. His interest in Japanese ink-painting techniques is reflected in his work titled Vijay (Victory, 1965). He had come across this technique during his visit to Japan under the Rockefeller Fellowship.

=== Themes ===
Khanna's early themes were inspired from the life style of the fisher folk – their brown southern complexion glowing in sunlight and the moods of the sea. Later, his compositions took a more sombre turn and moved towards introspection. In the early 1960s, his landscapes gradually merged into abstract paintings based on the Japanese sumi-e technique. These abstract creations acquired surreal undertones after his visit to the Indo-Pakistani war of 1965 battlefields. His canvases started featuring people again and violence became his theme. The sensuous nudes and draped female figures appeared to be creatures of passion or the victims of a violent assault. There was a deliberate ambiguity in the treatment of his theme.

“All great art has to be local. When I say local, I mean an artist has to draw from the things near to him so that a certain impression comes through in his paintings. At the same time, great art transcends the ordinary moment and strives to a moment in infinity”

— Krishen Khanna, India Modern: Narratives From 20th Century Indian Art

The transition to social and ironical themes in Khanna's paintings came about in the late 1960s when he started to portray the culture of the middle-classe people. Vegetable and fruit sellers on city pavements, storytellers ringed by street urchins, people at leisure in neighbourhood cafes and dhabas, bandwallahs in their crimson red uniforms with shining braids and buttons, celebrations of festivals and processions. In 1974, he painted the Truck series. In this series, the truck is depicted as a symbol of the world moving towards a catastrophe with the overpowering technology and a steadily decaying moral & social context.

Khanna was also influenced by the stories of New Testament and the humanity of Jesus, thus depicted him mainly as an ordinary human being in his paintings. He painted a series in a style different from the post-Renaissance European painting, which were known to mask the agony and passion of the subject matter. In 1980, thirteen paintings of this series were exhibited in Delhi.

=== Reception ===
On 7 June 1964, The Illustrated Weekly of India called him a non-objective painter of note and quoted,"His is a comparatively sophisticated, self-conscious manipulation of tones and textures."

In the 15 October 1973 edition of Indian and Foreign Review, Indian artist and author J. Swaminathan wrote,"...What is most important in Krishen's painting is not the subject matter but the formal element. It is in fact the formal organization which goes to make his figures meaningful in art."

On 11 December 1973, The Times of India published,"...Krishen Khanna's canvases are a statement of the human predicament. It matters little whether they relate directly to the Indian scene...in the final analysis they are a biting comment on the visible increase of violence in the world and its grim tolerance and acceptance of death."

== Work ==
Some of Khanna's well known paintings include News of Gandhiji's Death (1950), Truckwallahs (1970s) and Bandwallahs (1980s) series, The Last Supper (1979), La Pieta (1988), and A Far Afternoon (2014) to name a few. These artworks are examples of the richness of the world, whose colour-behavior, paint brushing, dynamism of lines, skill of arrangement and sensibility of subjects have a deep impact on the viewer.

Khanna had illustrated the book As They Saw India (1971) written by his father, K. C. Khanna. The book encapsulates the views of Megasthenes, Faxian, Xuanzang and Al-Biruni, on how they perceived and described India in their documentation.

Khanna's oil painting The Game depicting a conference was installed in the boardroom of Larsen & Toubro's Mumbai office.

The lobby of ITC Maurya Hotel in New Delhi features a mural created by Khanna, titled The Great Procession. Spanning across a three-thousand-square-foot ceiling, the mural was painted over a period of more than two years. It depicts a yatra and incorporates the Buddhist Indian life and philosophy.

=== Major exhibitions ===
Khanna has held more than forty one-man shows of his works in India and abroad, along with participating in many international exhibitions. He brought international recognition to Indian art by participating in the Tokyo Biennial in 1957, the São Paulo Biennial in 1961 and the Venice Biennial in 1962.

Khanna's first exhibition in England was held at Leicester Galleries in 1960 where his works included Sun in my garden and Pandemonium in a hedge. The review of this exhibition mentioned that "the rhythmical foliated pattern and sense of colour in these works showcase that something of the Mughal painting tradition is here being brought up to date." His second exhibition at the same venue was held in 1962.

About 120 of his works were displayed in his retrospective exhibition (23 January to 5 February 2010) organized by Saffron Art in the galleries of Lalit Kala Akademi located at Rabindra Bhavan, New Delhi.

=== Public collections ===
Khanna's works are part of the collections at the National Gallery of Modern Art, Museum of Modern Art, Jehangir Nicholson Art Foundation and Bharat Bhavan among many others.

=== Awards and recognition ===
In 1965, Khanna received the national award by Lalit Kala Akademi Award, New Delhi, and a fellowship of the Council of Economics and Cultural Affairs, New York. He has received the Lalit Kala Ratna from the President of India in 2004, the Padma Shri in 1990 and the Padma Bhushan in 2011.

Khanna campaigned for several years to promote peace and goodwill between India and Pakistan. For his efforts in promoting peace, he was awarded with a lifetime achievement award by the Government of India in 2003.

== In popular culture ==
=== Books ===
Gone Away: An Indian Journey (1960), a memoir by Dom Moraes, consists details about the author's meeting with Krishen among other painters.

The cover of the book The Modernity of Tradition (1967) features an adapted version of the painting Boy with Two Bulls by Khanna.

The Invincible Traveller (1980) is a collection of short stories which features a narrative account and sketches by Khanna. Titled A Rajasthan Diary, he has penned down his experience of traveling for about a fortnight in Rajasthan through dated diary entries.

Socialite Evenings (1989) written by Shobhaa De finds a mention of a painting by Delhi painter Krishen Khanna.

Khanna was a mentor and promoted the art of Radhika Chand, an Indian artist with Down syndrome. This has been covered in the book Climb Every Mountain – Radhika's Story (1997), written by Indeera Chand.

Beside the Shadblow Tree: A Memoir of James Laughlin (1999) contains an excerpt where the author describes a painting party hosted by Khanna and the experience of getting involved in the same.

The book City of Sin and Splendor: Writings on Lahore (2005) contains a memoir written by Khanna, titled I Went Back. He reminisces about the memories of Lahore as a former resident and the time when he went back to the city during the First International Biennale of Art in 1988.

Krishen Khanna: The Embrace of Love (2005) is a retrospective book which reflects on about six-decades of his artistic output until then.

Krishen Khanna: Images in My Time (2007) is a biographical book which incorporates essays on different themes and colour plates of paintings by Khanna. The works discussed in the volume are based on life in India and Christian themes, including The Raising of Lazarus and The Last Supper.

Incarnations: A History of India in Fifty Lives (2016) by Sunil Khilnani features interview excerpts with Khanna in the chapters dedicated to Amrita Sher-Gil and M. F. Husain.

=== Documentaries ===
Khanna had painted a portrait of Salman Rushdie's mother in the 1940s which was rejected by latter's father. Later, Khanna had permitted M. F. Husain to paint over the rejected portrait. On 11 September 1995, Salman Rushdie and the Lost Portrait was a documentary broadcast on BBC Two wherein Khanna, Husain and Rushdie came together to discuss the story behind the portrait. Rushdie wrote about this discussion with the two artists in his book Joseph Anton: A Memoir (2012) which provides detailed information about the conversation they had on the lost portrait.

A Far Afternoon – A painted saga by Krishen Khanna (2015) is a feature documentary directed by Sruti Harihara Subramanian and produced by Piramal Art Foundation. It traces the journey of Khanna as an artist.

== Personal life ==
In 1950, Krishen Khanna married Renuka Chatterjee. They had one son and two daughters.
