= Ram Kumar (artist) =

Artist (1924–2018)

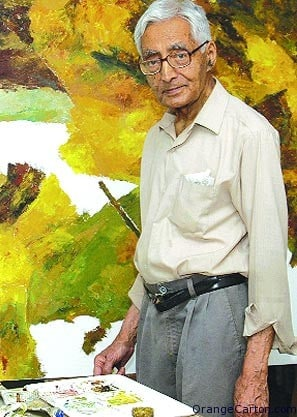
- Born: 23 September 1924; Shimla, Punjab, British India (now Shimla, Himachal Pradesh, India)
- Died: 14 April 2018 (aged 93); New Delhi, India
- Education: Sharada Ukil School of Art, New Delhi (1945)
- Known for: Painting
- Awards: Fellowship of the Lalit Kala Akademi, 2011 Padma Bhushan, 2010; Lifetime Achievement Award, Government of Delhi Officers Arts et Letter, 2003; Kalidas Samman, 1986; Premchand Puraskar, 1972; Padmashree, 1972 J. D. Rockefeller III Fellowship, New York, 1970

Ram Kumar (23 September 1924 – 14 April 2018) was an Indian artist and writer who has been described as one of India's foremost abstract painters. He was associated with the Progressive artists' group along with greats like M.F. Hussain, Tyeb Mehta, S.H. Raza. He is said to be one of the first Indian artists to give up figurativism for abstract art. His art commands high prices in the domestic and international market. His work "The Vagabond" fetched $1.1 million at Christie's, setting another world record for the artist. He is also one of the few Indian Modernist masters accomplished in writing as well as painting.

== Early life and education ==
Ram Kumar Verma was born in Shimla, the capital of the Indian state of Himachal Pradesh in a large middle-class family of eight brothers and sisters. His father was a government employee from Patiala in Punjab, India who worked in the Civil and Administrative Division in the British Government. While pursuing M.A. in economics from St. Stephen's College, Delhi, he chanced upon an art exhibition in 1945. One evening, after "loitering" around Connaught Place with his friends from St Stephen's College, he landed up at an art exhibition.

I saw paintings like that for the first time and it made me so intrigued that I returned several times".

Ram Kumar took classes at the Sharda Ukil School of Art under Sailoz Mukherjee and gave up employment at a bank in 1948 to pursue art. Sailoz Mukherjee was a painter from Shantiniketan School who introduced him to still life painting with live models. While a student there, he met Raza at an exhibition. Raza and Ram became good friends. He convinced his father to pay for a one-way ticket to Paris and studied further there under Andre Lhote and Fernand Léger. In Paris, the pacificist peace movement attracted him and he joined the French Communist Party. Seeking inspiration in the Social Realists such as Kathe and Fourgenon. He was befriended by S.H. Raza and MF Hussain who are two major artists.

== Career ==
Ram Kumar painted abstract landscapes, usually in oil or acrylic. He was also associated with the Progressive artists' group.

Ram Kumar has participated in various exhibitions in and out of India, including the 1958 Venice Biennale and the Festival of India shows in the then USSR and Japan in 1987 and 1988. One of Ram Kumar's latest solo exhibitions was in 2008 in Delhi. Ram Kumar also wrote in Hindi and eight collections of his works have been published, as well as two novels and a travelogue.

The human condition is the main concern of the painter manifested in his early works by the alienated individual within the city. Later the city, specifically Varanasi with its dilapidated, crammed houses, conveys a sense of hopelessness. Increasingly abstract works done in sweeping strokes of paint evoke both exultation of natural spaces and more recently an incipient violence within human habitation.

As the interest in Indian art has grown, paintings by Ram Kumar are getting increasing recognition in the art market.

Ram Kumar received the Padma Shri in 1972 and the Padma Bhushan, India's third highest civilian honour, in 2010. Lal Bhi Udhaas Ho Sakta Hai (Even Red Can be Sad), a 2015 documentary feature directed by Amit Dutta and produced by the Government of India's Films Division charts the various works of Kumar.

== Personal life ==
Ram Kumar was also the older brother of the famous Hindi writer, Nirmal Verma and younger brother of Colonel, Raj Kumar Verma. He lived and worked in Delhi until his death in 2018.

== Awards and honours ==
- John D. Rockefeller III Fellowship, New York, 1970
- Padmashree, Government of India, 1972
- Premchand Puraskar, Government of Uttar Pradesh, 1972
- Kalidas Samman, Government of Madhya Pradesh, 1986
- Officers Arts et Letters, Government of France, 2003
- Lifetime Achievement Award, Government of Delhi, 2010
- Padma Bhushan, Government of India, 2010
- Fellowship of the Lalit Kala Akademi, 2011
