= K. H. Ara =

Indian painter (1914–1985)

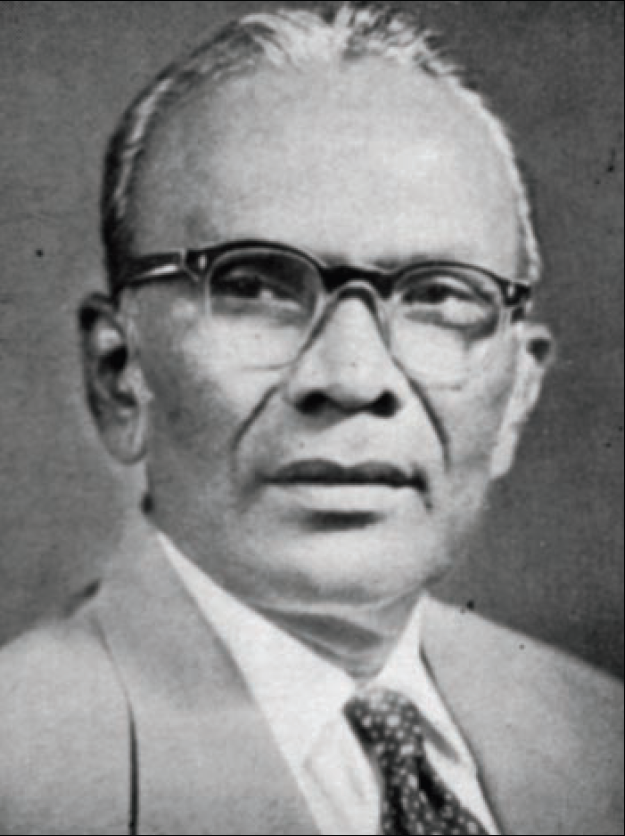
- Born: 16 April 1914; Bolarum, Secunderabad
- Died: 30 June 1985 (aged 71); Mumbai, Maharashtra
- Education: Sir J. J. School of Art, Mumbai
- Known for: Painting
- Notable work: Two Jugs
- Movement: Progressive Artists' Group

Krishnaji Howlaji Ara (16 April 1914 – 30 June 1985) was an Indian painter and is seen as the first contemporary Indian painter to meticulously use the female nude as a subject. He was a part of the Progressive Artists' Group in Bombay and was a founder of the Artists' Centre in Mumbai. Opinions about Ara's works remain divided with his critics accusing them of lacking perfection and not referenced from life. In 2017, curator Qaroon Thapar 22 works of Ara in an exhibition in Mumbai called "Privately Ara".

== Early life ==
Ara was born in Bolarum, Secunderabad in April 1914, the son of a chauffeur. His mother died when he was three and his father remarried. He ran away from home to Mumbai when he was seven. The city remained his home until his death in 1985. In Mumbai he earned a living by cleaning cars and later found employment with an English family as a houseboy. While employed he nevertheless found time to engage with his passion for painting and it soon caught the attention of first Rudy von Leyden, an art critic from the Times of India, and then Walter Langhammer, the Editor of the Illustrated Weekly of India. Langhammer was so impressed by Ara's skill that had him enrolled at the J.J. School of Art.

Ara participated in the Salt Satyagraha during the Civil Disobedience Movement and was jailed for five months. He later found employment with a Japanese firm as a car cleaner. Later, on India's independence he created a large canvas depicting an Independence Day procession of a multitude of Indian people in exuberant celebrations.

== Career as an artist ==
Ara hosted his first solo show at the Chetana Restaurant in Bombay in 1942 which was a runaway success. He joined the Progressive Artists' Group which included M F Hussain, H A Gade, S H Raza, F N Souza and Sadanand Bakre in 1948. The group set up the Artists' Centre at Kala Ghoda, behind the Prince of Wales Museum. He held several shows with the group but with Souza, Raza, Gade and Bakre leaving India, the group became undone. From 1948 to 1955, Ara held several solo and group shows in Mumbai, Ahmedabad, Baroda and Calcutta and later had solo exhibitions across Eastern Europe, Japan, Germany and Russia. In 1963 he exhibited his "Black Nude" series in Mumbai and was part of the inaugural show at the Pundole Art Gallery. The Kumar Gallery, New Delhi acquired his works between 1955 and 1960.

== Artistic style ==
Ara began his career doing landscapes and paintings on socio-historical themes but he is best known for his still life and nude paintings. Ara was the first contemporary Indian painter to focus on the female nude as a subject while staying within the limits of naturalism. Several of his works deal with still life and human figure studies. While he initially used watercolours and gouaches, where his use of the impasto effect often made them resemble oil paintings, he later moved on to the use of oil paints. Here his successful execution of thin pigmentation recalled his initial work with water colors as seen in the painting "Woman with Flowers". Ara work reflected a deep influence of French modern artists, specially Paul Cezanne.

== Awards ==
Ara won the Governor's Award for painting in 1944 and a Gold Medal from the Bombay Art Society for his canvas "Two Jugs" in 1952. He also won the Windsor and Newton cash price, Bombay.

== Criticism ==
Some of his critics have accused his paintings of being poorly executed and not referenced from life. The wrongly depicted female genitalia in some of his nudes have also drawn criticism with some viewers claiming that his paintings of groups of vases have greater voluptuousness than his nude forms.

== Family and later life ==
Ara remained a lifelong bachelor and asexual as a person according to his adopted daughter Ruxana Pathan. Later in his career, Ara exhibited less and began to spend greater time at the Artists' Centre, where he often helped struggling artists from his personal funds. He lived in penury in the last decades of his life, far removed from the success he had enjoyed in the 1950s and 60s. Unlike Souza, Raza and Husain, his paintings have failed to emulate their renown or prices. Ara was part of the managing committee of the Bombay Art Society and later became a Fellow of Lalit Kala Akademi. He died in Mumbai in 1985.
