= Lalit Kala Akademi Fellowship =

- Award for individual contributions to Fine Arts
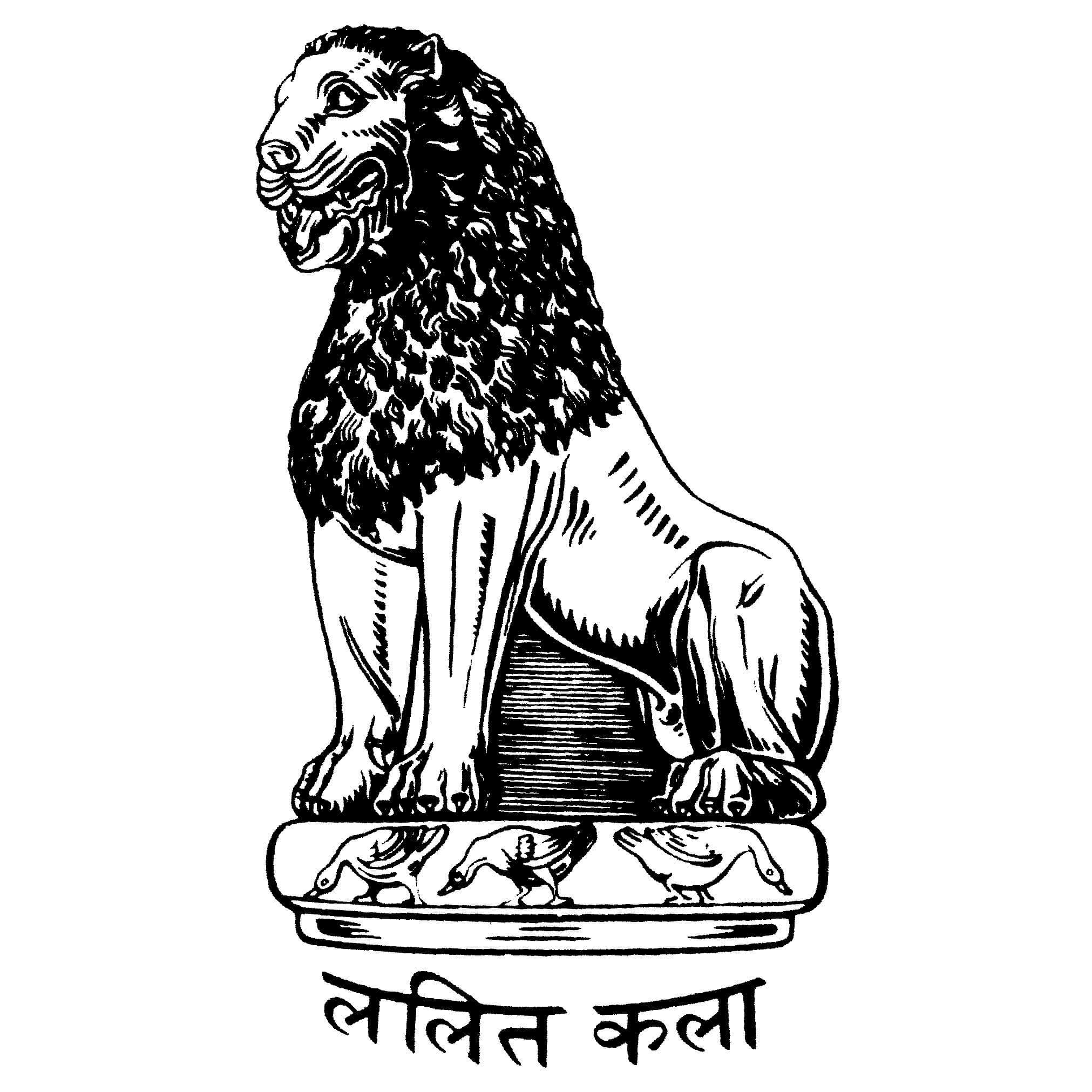
- Awarded for: Honour for the fine arts in India
- Sponsored by: Lalit Kala Akademi
- First award: 1955
- Final award: 2021

Highlights
- First winner: Jamini Roy
- Last winner: Himmat Shah; Jyoti Bhatt; Shyam Sharma
- Website: lalitkala.gov.in

The Lalit Kala Akademi Fellowship, also known as Lalit Kala Akademi Ratna (Sanskrit ratna, "gem") is an honor for the fine arts in India. It is awarded to eminent artists for their lifetime achievements in the field of visual arts by the Lalit Kala Akademi, India's National Academy of Art. It is regarded as the highest recognition and honour that can be bestowed on an artist in the country as the academy is a national body of the Government of India.

The ‘Fellow,’ carries a purse-money of Rs.25,000/-, a citation and a plaque. The Fellow is honored with a portfolio about their major art works. The first elected fellow was Jamini Roy in 1955. Most recent fellowship was awarded for the year 2021 to Himmat Shah, Jyoti Bhatt and Shyam Sharma on 9 April 2022.

== List of Fellows ==
List of Lalit Kala Akademi Fellows
Year	Image	Recipient
1955		Jamini Roy
1956		Nandalal Bose
1962		D. P. Roy Choudhury
1962		K. Venkatappa
1963	–	O. C. Ganguly
1964		Vinayak Pandurang Karmarkar
1964		S. L. Haldankar
1964	–	Rai Kishan Dass
1965	–	G. Venkatachalam
1965	–	C. Sivaramamurti
1970		Benode Behari Mukherjee
1970		Ravishankar Raval
1974		N. S. Bendre
1974		Mulk Raj Anand
1976		Ramkinkar Baij
1976	–	Kanwal Krishna
1976		K. K. Hebbar
1976	–	K. C. S. Paniker
1978		M. F. Husain
1978	–	Dhanraj Bhagat
1980	–	B. C. Sanyal
1980	–	Karl Jamshed Khandalavala
1980		V. R. Amberkar
1980	–	P. T. Reddy
1982		K. S. Kulkarni
1982	–	S. Dhanapal
1982	–	Sankho Chaudhuri
1982	–	Prodosh Dasgupta
1982		M. S. Randhawa
1984		K. H. Ara
1984		S. H. Raza
1985		K. G. Subramanyan
1985	–	K. Sreenivasulu
1986		Shiavax Chavda
1986	–	Paritosh Sen
1987		Mukul Dey
1987		Svetoslav Roerich
1988	–	Ram Gopal Vijayvargiya
1988	–	Ranbir Singh Bisht
1990	–	Bimal Das Gupta
1990	–	Radha Mohan
1993	–	A. S. Raman
1993		Amarnath Sehgal
1995		Kapila Vatsyayan
1995	–	Anand Dev
2002		A. Ramachandran
2003		Bikash Bhattacharjee
2004		Keshav Malik
2004		Akbar Padamsee
2006	–	Biren De
2007	–	Jeram Patel
2011		Ram Kumar
2014		Arpita Singh
2021	–	Himmat Shah
2021	–	Jyoti Bhatt
2021		Shyam Sharma

== See also ==
- List of Sangeet Natak Akademi fellows
- List of Sahitya Akademi fellows
