= V. R. Amberkar =

Indian painter and art critic

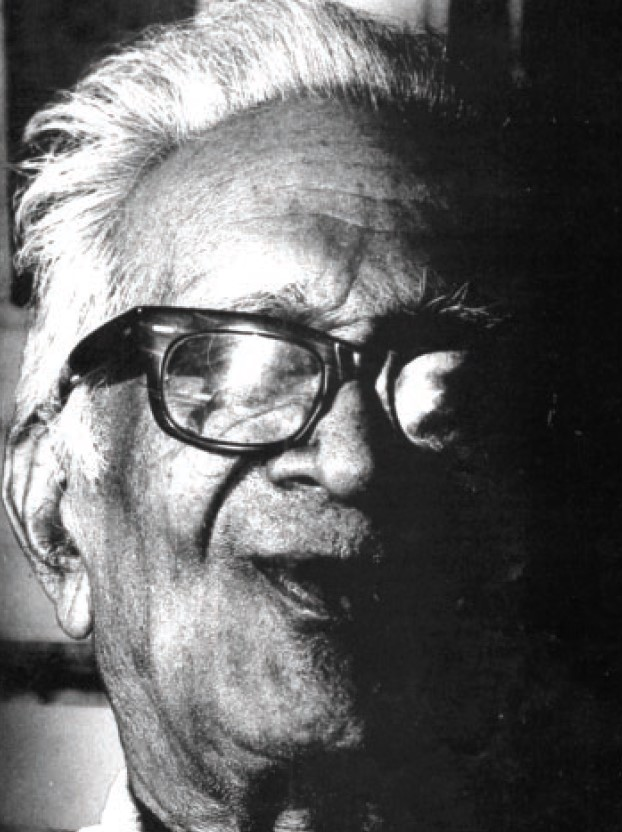
- Born: 21 July 1907; Bombay Presidency
- Died: 2 December 1988 (aged 81)
- Known for: Painting; art education; art criticism
- Awards: Fellowship of Lalit Kala Akademi (1980)

Vasant Raghunath Amberkar (21 July 1907 – 2 December 1988) was an Indian painter, art educator and art critic. V. R. Amberkar played an important role in the development of art education and its propagation in India.

== Early life and education ==
Vasant was born on 21 July 1907 in Bombay to Lakshmibai and Raghunath Amberkar. He completed his initial schooling from Colaba and later from Alibag. His father was a renowned doctor. After leaving the navy, he moved to Alibaug and started his own business there. As he was fond of literature, music, and drama, he gave his son the freedom to study subjects of his interest without forcing him to become a doctor.

Amberkar utilised this liberty given by his father to full effect. In 1931, he passed his Intermediate Arts Examination form the University of Bombay. He then graduated from Wilson College, Mumbai in 1933 with a B.A. in English followed by a M.A. in 1935. Given his mastery and creativity in English, he received multiple jobs from various British companies. Amberkar was the director of the publicity consulting firm Raymond-Renolds in 1946.

== Career ==
=== Painting ===
At the recommendation of Archibald Müller, Amberkar took art lessons at S. L. Haldankar's Art Institute, where he studied from 1933 to 1939. Meanwhile, he completed a four-year correspondence course in art education taught by Percy Bradshaw of the Press Art School in London. This gave him a new perspective on looking at art. His views pertaining to the basic principles of art were etched in his mind which directly influenced his career. After this, Amberkar had opened a studio named the Industrial Art Studio in Fort area of Mumbai where other painters, singers, musicians, writers, and theatre artists also worked.

Despite mastering realistic painting, his drive for experimentation gradually led to his paintings featuring heavy brushstrokes, few colours and a composition that avoided unnecessary details. Mid 1930s was the time when a modern outlook towards visual art started to take root in the art scene of Bombay. There was a greater flexibility in the arrangement of subjects, be it a landscape or a portrait. Like other painters of that time, Amberkar deliberately broke the existing trend of the past. Subsequently, the new trend was strengthened by the paintings of S. H. Raza, M. F. Husain and Akbar Padamsee to name a few.

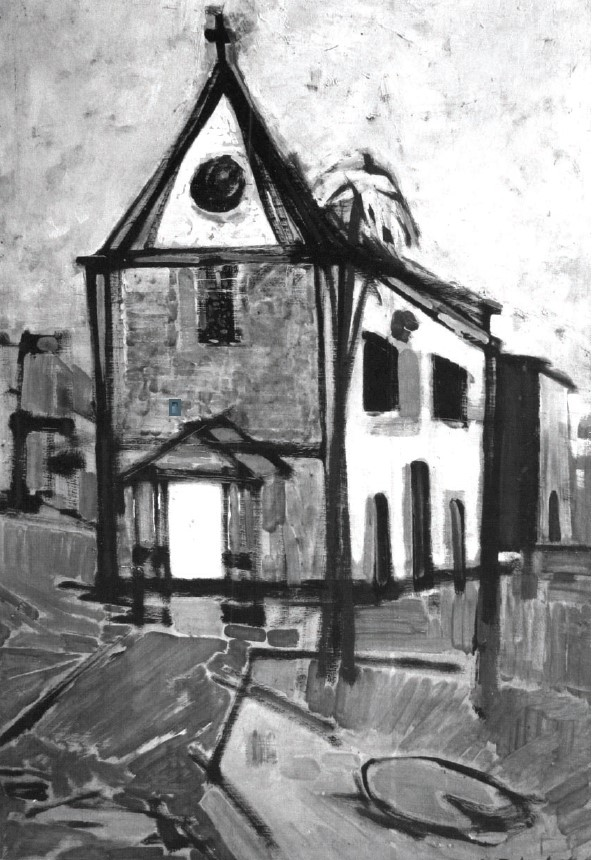
The Church (1960) by V. R. Amberkar

Amberkar's paintings show various influences, ranging from realistic to expressionist styles. In his landscape paintings, shape and space are explored through composition rather than realism. Both, The Dress (a human figure painting) and The Church (an architectural painting), are made with bold black lines and filled with colour. Some of his paintings also leaned towards abstraction. However, his contributions in the field of art education are considered more important than his outing with experimental paintings.

=== Art education ===
At the suggestion of his teacher S. L. Haldankar, Amberkar got involved in the work of Art Society of India and became its secretary. He uplifted the society through many activities and subsequently became its president in 1935. Amberkar was the part of a Bombay Government Committee in 1946 which had to survey and make recommendations about changes in art education. Around this time, he also worked with Lakshman Shastri Joshi on the board of Marathi Vishwakosh at Wai. When Hansa Mehta, influenced by Amberkar's ideas on art education, decided to reorganize the art department at Maharaja Sayajirao University of Baroda, she entrusted Amberkar with the responsibility of selecting an art curriculum and teachers for it. Under this course, Amberkar introduced the subjects of art history and aesthetics for the first time and taught these to the students there.

At the request of Madhav Satwalekar, the then Director of Arts of Maharashtra, he designed a new curriculum for art education in the state. The Directorate of Arts, Maharashtra, successfully implemented this course under his guidance by conducting summer camps for the teachers of all art colleges. After witnessing the success in Baroda and Mumbai, Amberkar was invited to define the contours of art education in Goa and Thiruvananthapuram. He insisted that art history, art criticism and aesthetics should be included in the curricula of all these places. He believed that the art world and artists in India would become more profound through this and continuously strived for their further propagation.

=== Other work on arts ===
Amberkar had represented the Bombay Government in the All India Conference on Arts, which led to the establishment of the National Academy of Arts in India, known as the Lalit Kala Akademi. Later, as a committee member and joint secretary of Lalit Kala Akademi, he suggested holding a regular World Triennale Exhibition at the academy. Amberkar was on the jury panel of the third edition of this triennale in 1975.

As Amberkar was well versed in the field of art, he received several invitations to deliver lectures and seminars. He mesmerised the audience with his eloquence in English. Some of his lectures covered in press include India and Modern Movements in Art, An Approach to Art, Co-relation of Arts, What is good art, and Great Works of Art and What Makes Them Great. He also wrote exhibition reviews in Marathi and English for newspapers and magazines. Additionally, he gave talks related to contemporary art on the Bombay station of the All India Radio.

== Awards ==
In 1946, Amberkar won a prize for his paintings at the annual exhibition of the Art Society of India. For his contributions in the field of art, he was awarded the Fellowship of Lalit Kala Akademi in 1980.

== Personal life ==
Amberkar married Neera Medhekar in June 1934.

== Death and legacy ==
Amberkar died on 2 December 1988. On his birth centenary in 2007, Amberkar's paintings were exhibited in the Master Strokes VI exhibition at the Jehangir Art Gallery.
