= Rajendra N Patil =

Indian cultural figure

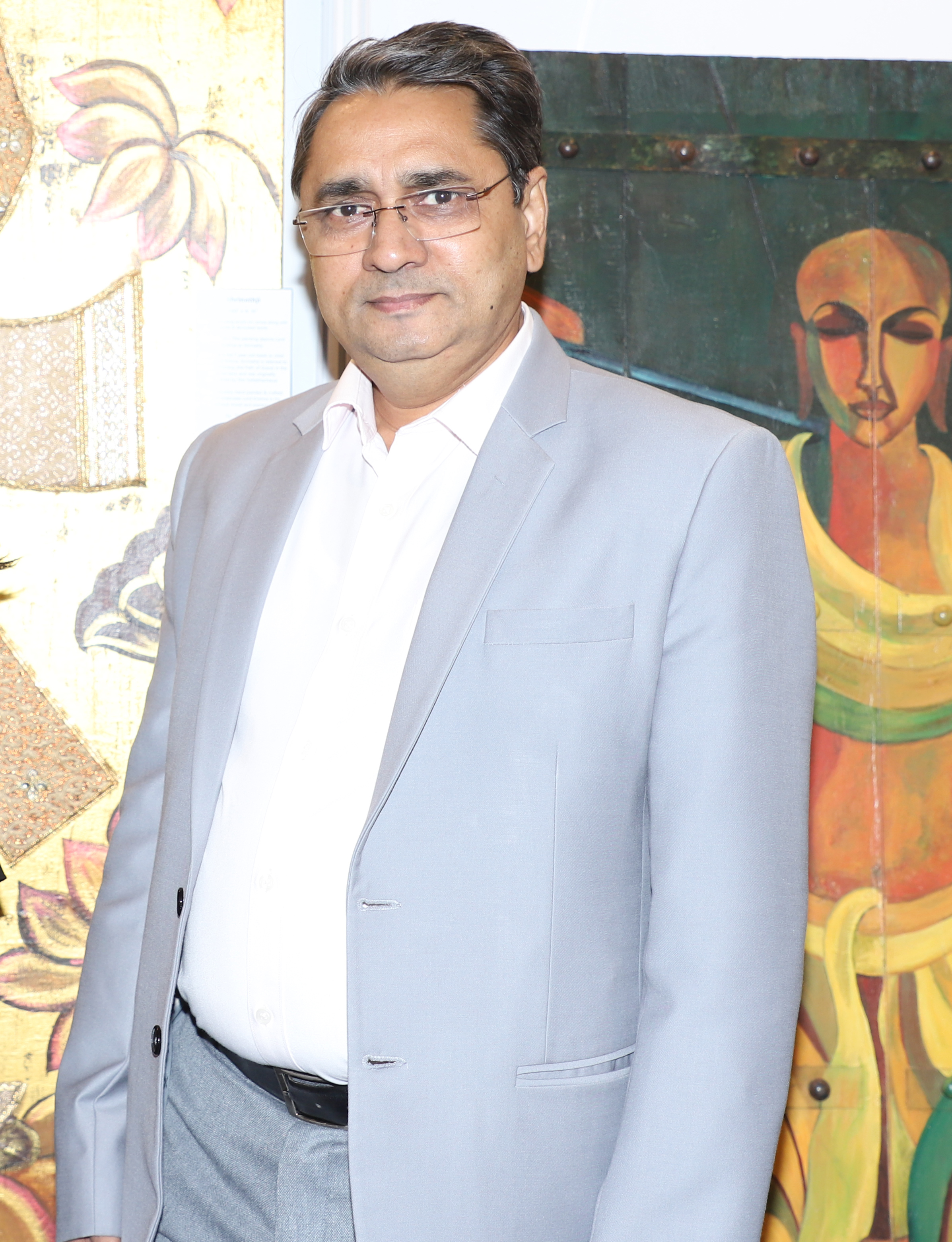
Rajendra Patil, President, The Bombay Art Society, Editor & Publisher, Indian Contemporary Art Journal, Founder Director, India Art Festival

Rajendra N Patil (born 1968) is an Indian art writer, editor, publisher, and art fair organizer. Apart from Founder Director of India Art Festival, a contemporary Indian art fair, he serves as the President of the Bombay Art Society, a venerable art institution with a rich legacy dating back to its establishment in 1888. In 2019, he was honored as a retail business icon by Mid-day, a well-known English newspaper published from Mumbai.

== Education ==
Born in Chopda, Rajendra Patil pursued his education in Chopda (Dist: Jalgaon). He obtained a B.Sc. in Electronics from the University of Pune and a B.Tech in Power Electronics from the Watumull Institute of Electronics Engineering and Computer Technology in 1994. Later, out of passion for arts, he pursued studies in ancient Indian culture and earned an MA degree from the University of Mumbai.

== Career ==
As Art Writer

Rajendra Patil embarked on his journey as an art writer in the mid-nineties, contributing to various publications such as Mumbai Sakal, Tarun Bharat, Lok Prabha, Maharashtra Times, Nandan from Kalabhavan, Santiniketan, Metropolis, Every Tuesday, Art India, Creative Mind, and Art & Deal, among others. He has authored catalogue essays for numerous artists and engaged in insightful conversations with luminaries in the art world. These conversations featuring in various art publications include notable figures such as Laxman Shreshta, Bose Krishnamachari, Samir Mondal, Riyas Komu, T. V. Santhosh, Prabhakar Kolte, Chittrovanu Mazumdar, G.R. Iranna, Atul Dodiya, Sunil Gawade, Prafulla Dahanukar, Sunil Padwal, Suhas Bahulkar, Vasudeo Kamat, and Ravi Mandlik.

== As editor and publisher ==
Patil was invited to serve as the editor of the Bombay Art Society's Art Journal from 2003 to 2008, the oldest art publication in India first published in 1910. He revitalized the society's art journal, which had faced numerous interruptions since its inception in 1910. In 2008, Patil initiated the Indian Contemporary Art Journal, a new quarterly art magazine published from Mumbai. As an editor, he has been invited to speak at various prestigious events, including the "ArtNext" seminar organized at Lalit Kala Academi in New Delhi (2012), the Gulbarga Visual Art College (2011), the State Art Exhibition at Jehangir Art Gallery (2005), and the Kokrajhar Music & Fine Art College in Assam (2004).

== As art fair organiser ==
Alongside Prafulla Dahanukar and Dr. Saryu Doshi, Rajendra Patil played a pivotal role in founding India Art Festival(IAF), a regional art fair, in 2011. Originating in Mumbai, this regional Indian art fair rapidly gained prominence, captivating artists, art enthusiasts, collectors, and art galleries from across India. Over time, the art festival has evolved into a nationwide event with editions now being held in major Indian cities such as New Delhi and Bengaluru in addition to Mumbai.
