= Bikash Bhattacharjee =

Indian artist (1940–2006)

- Bikash Bhattacharjee
- Born: 21 June 1940; Kolkata
- Died: 18 December 2006 (aged 66); Kolkata
- Education: Indian College of Art and Draftsmanship
- Known for: Painting
- Notable work: Fantasy Show; Doll Series; Cupboard; The Visitor; The Trap
- Movement: Realism, surrealism
- Awards: Padma Shri (1988); National Award, (1971)

Bikash Bhattacharjee (21 June 1940 – 18 December 2006) was an Indian painter from Kolkata, West Bengal. Influenced by the politically active atmosphere of Kolkata, his works depicted middle-class Bengali life, political turmoil, and social themes in photo-realist and surrealist styles. His famous 'Doll' series (1971) was a response to the violence following the Naxalite movement. He received the Lalit Kala Akademi National Award in 1971, the Banga Ratna in 1987, and was awarded the Padma Shri by the Government of India in 1988.

== Early life ==
Bhattacharjee was born in Kolkata 1940. At a very early age he lost his father. The consequent struggle for survival left him with a deep sense of insecurity as well as an empathy for the under-privileged, who often feature in his works.

In 1963, he graduated with a Diploma in Fine Arts from Indian College of Art and Draftsmanship.

Bikash lived in Kolkata all his life.

== Teaching career ==
Bhattacharjee taught at Indian College of Art and Draftsmanship from 1968 to 1972. He taught at the Government College of Art & Craft, Kolkata from 1973 to 1982. In 1964, he became a member of the Society of Contemporary Artists.

== Painting career ==
His first solo exhibition was at Kolkata in 1965. His paintings were exhibited outside India; he had shows in 1969 at Paris; between 1970 and 72 in Yugoslavia, Czechoslovakia, Romania and Hungary; in London in 1982; and in New York in 1985.

He achieved commercial success early in life with his Doll Series in the 1960s, which was later followed by the Durga Series. In the 1980s, Bhttacharjee painted illustrations for a novel on the life of Ram Kinker Baij, a great artist of the past. The novel, written by Bengali novelist Samaresh Basu, was never completed because of the death of the author, but Bhttacharjee's works for the book were some of his best.

Bhttacharjee often painted in a realistic style. He painted portraits of Tagore, Satyajit Ray, and Samaresh Basu. His portrait of Indira Gandhi, with a blurred and white face, was painted after her murder. He produced a series of works about the Naxal movement and a group of paintings of prostitutes.

Bikash had inspired a host of painters in India including Sanjay Bhattacharya, a realistic painter from Bengal.

== Style ==
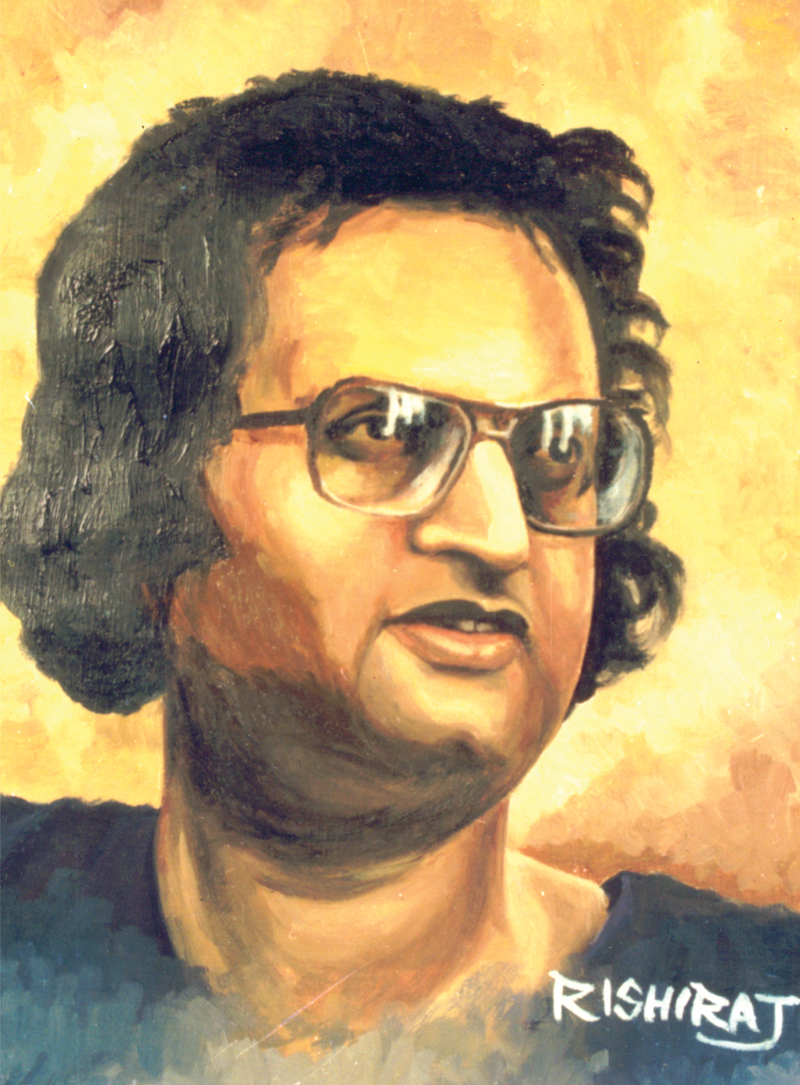
2010 portrait of Bikash Bhattacharjee

Bikash Bhattacharya is credited with bringing realism back to Indian art at a time when artists in India were leaning more towards distortion of figures and abstraction.

Besides painting the city and its people that he knew so well, Bhattacharjee was an accomplished portrait painter. Realism was Bhattacharjee's forte; his oil paintings could depict the exact quality of drapery or the skin tone of a woman. He achieved mastery in capturing the quality of light.

Bhattacharjee achieved an enigmatic quality in his paintings that works on many levels from the visual to the subconscious. Subject matter included depictions of the female form, and people of all ages and situations—old men and women, children, domestic help. He had the ability to create an authentic milieu as a background to the characters to heighten the drama.

Bikash had been deeply influenced by the surrealists, and stated that Salvador Dalí was his favourite painter.

== Personal life ==
In 2000, Bhattacharjee suffered a paralytic stroke that left him paralysed and unable to paint. He died in a Kolkata nursing home on 18 December 2006 following a prolonged illness. He was survived by his wife Parbati, a son, and a daughter.

== Galleries ==
His paintings can be found in the following galleries:

- National Gallery of Modern Art, New Delhi
- Lalit Kala Akademi, New Delhi
- Ministry of Education, New Delhi
- Chandigarh University Museum, Chandigarh
- Bharat Bhavan, Bhopal

== Awards and honours ==
- Academy of Fine Arts Award, Calcutta (1962)
- National Award, Lalit Kala Akademi, New Delhi (1971)
- Birla Academy of Art and Culture, Calcutta, National Award, Lalit Kala Akademi, New Delhi (1972)
- Banga Ratna (1987)
- Padma Shri (1988)
- Shiromani Purashkar (1989)
- Nivedita Purashkar, Ramkrishna Vivekananda Ashram (1990)
- Lalit Kala Akademi Fellowship (2003)
