= Bombay Progressive Artists' Group =

Group of modern artists based in Bombay

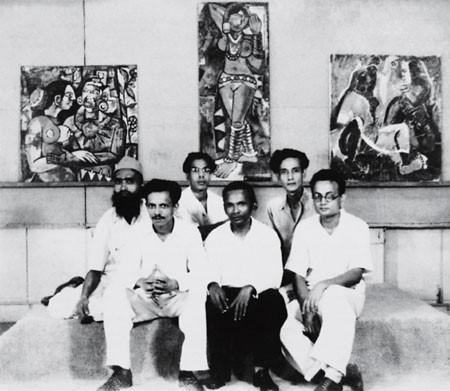
Bombay Progressive Artists Group

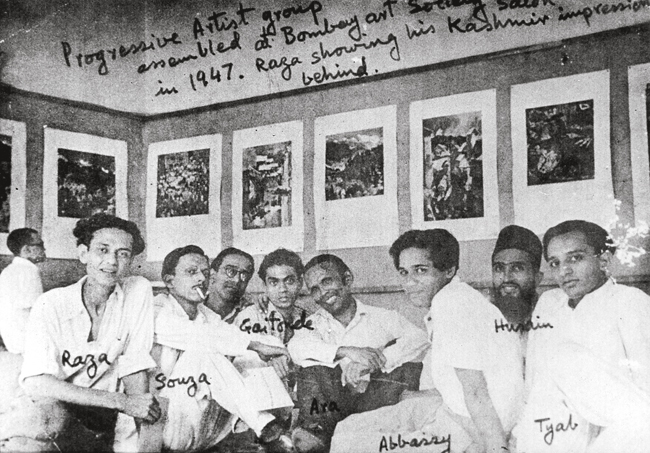
Bombay Progressive Artists Group, 1947

The Progressive Artists' Group (PAG), was a group of modern artists, mainly based in Bombay, from its formation in 1947. Though it lacked any particular style, there might be said to have been a move towards a synthesis of influences from Indian art history together with styles prevalent in Europe and North America during the first half of the 20th century, including Post-Impressionism, Cubism and Expressionism.

== History ==
The Progressive Artists' Group (PAG) was formed by six founder members, F. N. Souza, S. H. Raza, M. F. Husain, K. H. Ara, H. A. Gade, and S. K. Bakre (the only sculptor in the group). Others, who later got associated with the group included Ram Kumar, Akbar Padamsee and Tyeb Mehta.

The group wished to break with the revivalist nationalism established by the Bengal school of art and to encourage an Indian avant-garde, engaged at an international level. The Group was formed just months after the 14 August 1947 "Partition of India" and Pakistan that resulted in religious rioting and death of tens of thousands of people displaced by the new borders. The founders of the Progressive Artists Group often cite "the partition" as impetus for their desire for new standards in visual arts in India, starting with their new style of art. Their intention was to "paint with absolute freedom for content and technique, almost anarchic, save that we are governed by one or two sound elemental and eternal laws, of aesthetic order, plastic co-ordination and colour composition."

The original PAG disintegrated by 1950 with the departure of F. N. Souza, S. H. Raza, two important founders of PAG from India; Later S K Bakre also left the group and went to UK. The artists such as Vasudeo S. Gaitonde, Krishen Khanna and Mohan Samant continue the activities of the group with three original PAG members M F Husain, H A Gade and K H Ara in India for few more years. Bhanu Athaiya (the only woman artist associated with PAG), Krishen Khanna, and Mohan Samant too got associated with the group.

The Progressive Artists Group held three exhibitions all together. The first was held in 1948 at the Bombay Art Society’s Salon on Rampart Row, Kalaghoda, Bombay, India; the Bombay Art Society’s salon was later recognized as Artists Centre. The second show was held in Kolkata in 1950; by the time two of group’s main founders Raza and Souza had left India for Paris and UK respectively. The third and the last show was held with three founder members of PAG in which Krishen Khanna, Bhanu Athaiya, V S Gaitonde, A A Raiba also participated in 1953. The group was ultimately disbanded in 1956.

European Modernism was the most distinctive influence on the group, but its members worked in dramatically different styles, from the Expressionism of Souza to the pure abstraction of Gaitonde. Specific Indian imagery and landscapes were also adopted, particularly by Mehta and Husain. Through the incorporation and mixture of new, abstract styles with traditional Indian art elements and Media, the PAG is one of the most influential art movements in India until today.

In 2015, F.N. Souza's painting "Birth" set a new record for Indian art with a hammer price above US$4 Million, which shows the worldwide appeal of the group.

== See also ==
- Baroda Group
- Calcutta Group
- Madras Art Movement

== Sources ==
- Partha Mitter, Indian Art (Oxford History of Art), Oxford University Press (2001), ISBN 0-19-284221-8
