= K. S. Kulkarni =

Indian painter (1918–1994)

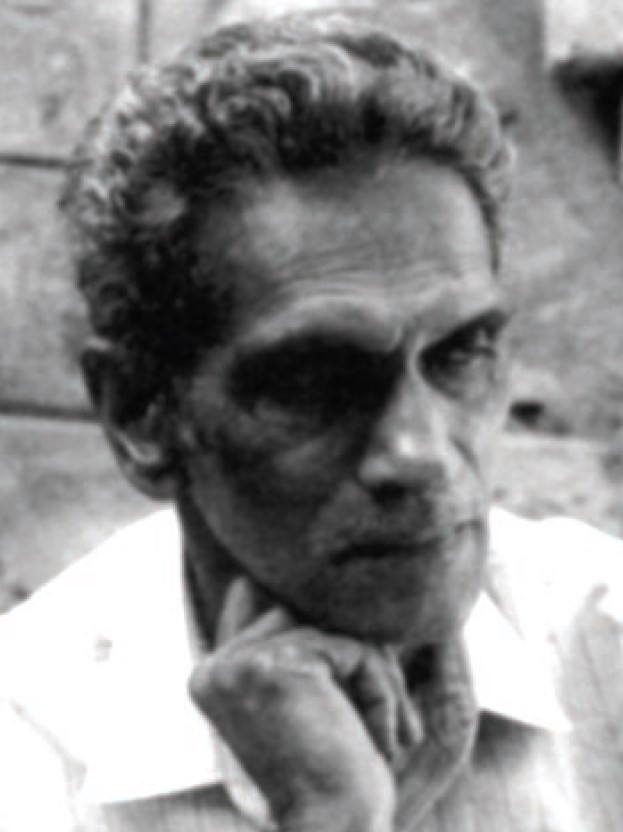
- Born: 7 April 1916; Belgaum, India
- Died: 7 October 1994 (aged 78)
- Education: Sir J. J. School of Art, Mumbai
- Occupation: Painter
- Awards: Fellow of Lalit Kala Akademi (1982)

Krishna Shamrao Kulkarni (7 April 1916 – 7 October 1994) was an Indian painter and an educator. His work was part of the painting event in the art competition at the 1948 Summer Olympics. He was the founder-president of the avant-garde artist movement, the Delhi Shilpi Chakra.

Kulkarni created paintings that were at the confluence of tradition & modern art values and influenced by styles he witnessed during his travels abroad. His ideas, technical skills and teaching has influenced the work of many contemporary painters who have trained in the art institutes of Delhi and Varanasi.

== Early life and education ==
Kulkarni was born on 7 April 1916 in Belgaum, Karnataka. Being interested in painting since childhood, he wanted to pursue arts at the Bombay school. However, after the death of his father, he struggled to earn a livelihood and pay for school. To make ends meet, Kulkarni worked as a painter of signboards and movie banners in the early 1930s. He then attended Sir J. J. School of Art from 1935 to 1940 in Mumbai and earned a G. D. Art in Painting. Subsequently, in the year 1942 he completed a two-year post-graduate course in murals from the same institute. Shortly after, he received a research scholarship for 1941 to 1943 from Tata Trusts to study Indian painting. Kulkarni was also associated with the Quit India Movement in 1942.

== Career ==
After completing his education, Kulkarni was offered a job as a designer at a textile mill in Delhi. Even though he wasn't formally trained for this job, he decided to accept it due to the financial conditions of the family. Gradually, he acquired the necessary skills in a short period of time which impressed the mill owner. After his year-long probation, he was made a permanent employee with a salary of Rs. 350 per month. However, he was bugged by the transfers in his job and the imposing nature of the mill owner. He thought that this work wasn't useful for him, which is why he left this job in 1945.

In the same year, Kulkarni decided to teach students and joined the art department of Delhi Polytechnic. Alongside his role as a teacher, he was one of the founders of the Triveni Kala Sangam. He also became the founder-president of Delhi Shilpi Chakra - an artists' group which was established in 1949 to encourage and inspire young progressive thinkers in the Delhi area. This was the time when Kulkarni gained recognition not only as an institution builder but also for his kind nature as a teacher and an artist.

=== Travels abroad ===
Throughout his lifetime, Kulkarni traveled abroad frequently. In 1949, he became the first Indian artist to participate in the International Arts Program, USA, sponsored by the Rockefeller Foundation. Further, he traveled to Mexico, Guatemala, Peru, and Brazil where he learned and studied their art. He was also invited by the governments of the USA, USSR, Germany, Poland, Mexico, South Korea, Netherlands and the UK as a guest artist.

=== Academic roles ===
- 1945-1962: Professor in the art department of Delhi Polytechnic, New Delhi
- 1961-1963: Visiting professor at the School of Planning and Architecture, New Delhi
- 1972-1978: Dean, Faculty of Music and Fine Arts at Banaras Hindu University, Varanasi
- 1969-1972: Visiting professor in Department of Painting and Asian Studies at Skidmore College, New York
- 1987-1991: Visiting professor at College of Art, Delhi

=== Leadership positions ===
- 1948: Founding member of Triveni Kala Sangam and served as the art director from 1949 to 1968
- 1948-1952: Secretary of All India Fine Arts and Crafts Society (AIFACS), Delhi
- 1949: Founder-president of Delhi Shilpi Chakra
- 1973-1978: Vice-chairman of Lalit Kala Akademi, New Delhi
- 1972-1978: Chairman of Lalit Kala Akademi, Uttar Pradesh

== Work ==
The range of works created by Kulkarni include numerous sketches, oil and acrylic paintings, sculptures in terracotta, wood as well as ceramic. His works were usually experimental and shifted from the expected artistic output of that time. His notable creations are 'Three Sisters', 'Mother and Child' and 'Village Maiden' to name a few. During the year 1979, Kulkarni went partially blind and lost his ability to recognize people for some time. He convinced a doctor in Texas to perform delicate eye surgery in exchange for paintings. Even though the surgery was a success, a cataract continued to hamper his vision, causing difficulty performing his work.

=== Style ===
Kulkarni worked between figuration and abstraction which led to a constant evolution of his style over the course of his career. During his travels abroad, he absorbed the life there and refined a style authentic to his origins at home. He did not follow orthodox styles and embraced the bold, deliberate lines of modernism. His depiction of human figures combined the classical figures of the Ajanta murals, the Chola bronzes along with a touch of modernism. In his later works, the stylistic influence of Pablo Picasso's Cubism is markedly visible that merge with the forms of traditional Indian folk and tribal art.

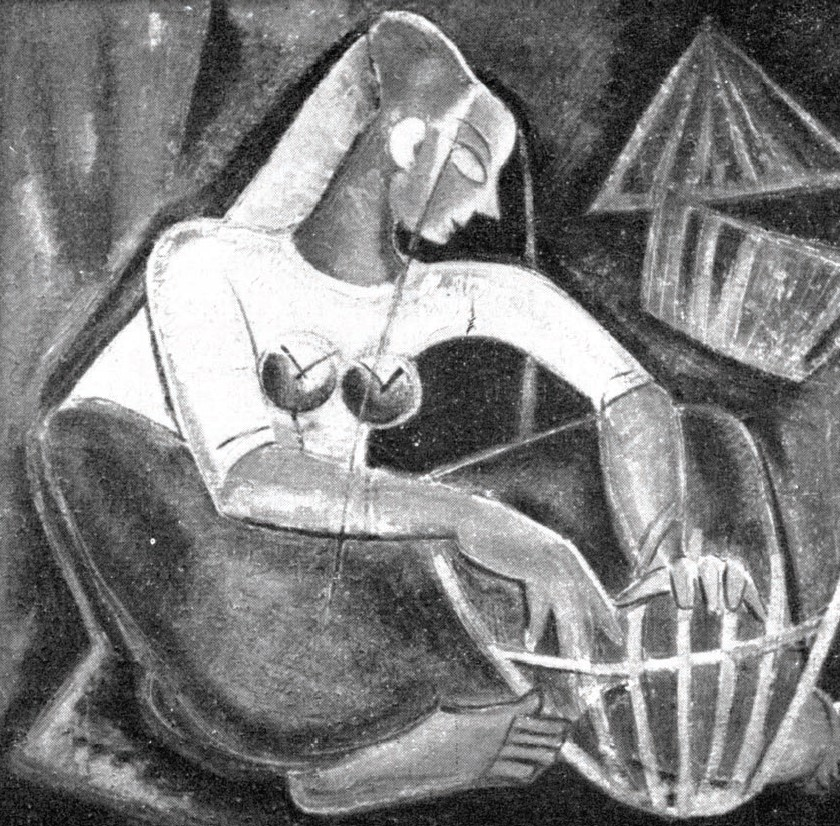
Basket Maker by K. S. Kulkarni

=== Themes ===
In the works of Kulkarni, the themes mainly revolved around the daily life, with rural scenes being the subject of a large number of his works. They were portrayed with empathy but not with a sentimental tone.

=== Reception ===
In summarizing Kulkarni's art towards the end of his life, J. Swaminathan wrote: "A superb draftsman, Kulkarni is also a master colorist. The fantastic vibrancy he achieves by the soft, light strokes of his brush casts an aura of light through and around the boldly and vigorously delineated forms; the swift strokes build up planes of color which transform perspective space into aesthetic space, set up an orchestration which engulfs and entices the viewer into the unfathomable depths of a world created within the four corners of the canvas. His range is wide, and the eye moves with unanticipated delight from orange to amber to veridian in the unique harmonies he creates with the deft and sure touch of a master impresario. Rarely using the impasto, shunning the temptation of grafted textures, he is able to impart a rare clarity and simplicity to his images through the sheer manipulation of tonalities. His canvases have a freshness which does not brook over painting; the surface of the canvas can be felt through each maiden stroke of the brush."

=== Major exhibitions ===
- 1945 - First solo exhibition at All India Fine Arts & Crafts Society (AIFACS), Delhi
- 1959 - Participated in São Paulo Art Biennial, Brazil
- 1986 - A retrospective exhibition by Birla Academy of Art and Culture, Calcutta
- 2021 - Home and Away, Aicon Gallery, New York

=== Public collections ===
- National Gallery of Modern Art, New Delhi
- Delhi Art Gallery, New Delhi
- Kumar Gallery, New Delhi

=== Awards and honours ===
- 1947 - Bronze medal at the International Exhibition in London
- 1955, 1962 & 1965 - National Award by Lalit Kala Akademi, New Delhi
- 1982 - Fellow of Lalit Kala Akademi
- 1985 - Appointed National Emeritus Professor by the Government of India for outstanding contribution to art
- 1986 - Parishad Samman by Sahitya Kala Parishad, New Delhi

== Death and legacy ==
Kulkarni died on 7 October 1994.

According to his will, K. S. Kulkarni Trust and annual scholarship programs were established to encourage young artists.

In 1988, K. S. Kulkarni, a monograph on the artist, was published by Lalit Kala Akademi, New Delhi. Kulkarni, a film on the life of the artist was produced by Vanessa H. Smith, which premiered in 1996. In 2000, another documentary titled K. S. Kulkarni: Saintly Great Master by Chandramani Kohli was released.
