= Biren De =

Indian painter (1926–2011)

- Born: 8 October 1926; Bengal Presidency, British India
- Died: 12 March 2011 (aged 84); New Delhi, India
- Occupation: Painter
- Known for: Modern art Tantric designs
- Awards: Lalit Kala Akademi National Award (1958,1964); Padma Shri (1992); Fellow of Lalit Kala Akademi (2006)

Biren De (1926–2011) was an Indian painter of modern art, known for his paintings with tantric influences. His paintings were characterized by symmetrical patterns of geometry and the presence of tantric symbols such as mandala, phallus and vagina, reportedly representing masculine and feminine energies of the universe. The Government of India awarded him the fourth highest civilian honour of the Padma Shri in 1992.

== Biography ==
Biren De was born in Faridpur, in the Bengal Presidency (now Bangladesh) on 8 October 1926. He relocated to Kolkata along with his family and joined the Government College of Art & Craft, Kolkata in 1944 for his graduate studies but did not accept the graduate diploma, citing a rift with the then college principal. He moved to New Delhi in 1949 when he was commissioned for a mural at the University of Delhi. His first overseas exhibition was held at Salon de Mai, Paris, in 1951. Returning to India, he joined the College of Art, Delhi, in 1952, as a member of their faculty and stayed at the job till 1963.

During his tenure at the College of Art, he spent one year in New York, on a Fulbright Scholarship. It was after this period, his paintings started to depict tantric symbols. In 1966, his works were exhibited at the Kumar's Gallery, New Delhi and Hayward Gallery, London. His works have since been displayed at several places including National Gallery of Modern Art, New Delhi, Berlin State Museum and the National Gallery, Prague, Royal Academy of Arts, London, Tokyo festival of India of 1988, and at the biennales in Venice, Tokyo, São Paulo, Mainichi and Sydney.

De received the Lalit Kala Akademi National Award in 1958 which he received a second time in 1964. The Government of India included him in the Republic Day honours list for the civilian award of the Padma Shri in 1992. He was elected as the Fellow of Lalit Kala Akademi in 2006. He died on 12 March 2011, at the age of 84.

== Exhibitions ==
List of selected exhibitions:

- Salon de Mai, Paris - 1951
- Freemasons Hall, New Delhi. - 1952
- All India Fine Arts and Crafts Society (AIFACS) - 1953, 54 and 56
- Lalit Kala Akademi, New Delhi - 1953 and 64
- Mainichi Biennale, Tokyo - 1959 and 61
- Contemporary Art from India, Museum Folkwang, Essen - 1960
- São Paulo Biennale, Brazil - 1961
- Venice Biennale, Italy - 1962
- Ten Contemporary Indian Painters, Cambridge–MIT Institute - 1965
- Hayward Gallery, London - 1966
- Pittsburgh International Show, USA - 1967
- International Triennale India, New Delhi - 1968, 71, 75, 78 and 82
- Contemporary Indian Painting exhibition, Washington DC - 1971
- Contemporary Indian Painting exhibition, Pasadena - 1971
- Contemporary Indian Painting exhibition, - Toronto 1971
- Chanakya Gallery, New Delhi - 1971
- Contemporary Indian Art, USSR - 1972
- Contemporary Indian Art, Greece - 1972
- 25 Years of Indian Art, New Delhi - 1972
- 25 Years of Indian Art, Bombay - 1972
- 25 Years of Indian Art, Madras - 1972
- Sydney Biennale, Australia - 1973
- Contemporary Indian Painting, Washington DC - 1973
- Contemporary Indian Painting, Los Angeles - 1973
- Contemporary Indian Painting, Toronto - 1973
- Gallery Chemould, Bombay - 1973
- Gallery Chemould, Bombay - 1974
- Indian Painting Today, Belgium - 1973
- Indian Painting Today, Yugoslavia - 1973
- Indian Painting Today, Bulgaria - 1973
- Indian Painting Today, Belgium - 1974
- Indian Painting Today, Yugoslavia - 1974
- Indian Painting Today, Bulgaria - 1974

== See also ==
- Tantra
