= Tamas (film) =

1988 Indian television film

- Based on: Tamas by Bhisham Sahni
- Screenplay by: Govind Nihalani
- Directed by: Govind Nihalani
- Starring: Om Puri; Deepa Sahi; Bhisham Sahni; Surekha Sikri
- Narrated by: Bhisham Sahni
- Music by: Vanraj Bhatia
- Country of origin: India
- Original language: Hindi

Production
- Producers: Lalit M. Bijlani; Govind Nihalani; Freni Variava
- Cinematography: V. K. Murthy; Govind Nihalani
- Editor: Sutanu Gupta
- Running time: 298 minutes

Original release
- Release: 1988

Tamas (lit. Darkness) is a 1988 period television film written and directed by Govind Nihalani. It is based on the Hindi novel of the same name by Bhisham Sahni (1974), which won the author the Sahitya Akademi Award in 1975. Set in the backdrop of riot-stricken Pakistan at the time of the partition of India in 1947, the film deals with the plight of emigrant Sikh and Hindu families to India as a consequence of the partition. It was first shown on India's national broadcaster Doordarshan as a mini-series and later as a one-off four-hour-long feature film. At the 35th National Film Awards, it won three awards including the Nargis Dutt Award for Best Feature Film on National Integration. In August 2013, it was shown on History TV18 as a series.

== Plot ==
Nathu, a Chamar, is finishing his work in his shop when the thekedar walks in and asks him to kill a pig for the Veterinary doctor who needs it for medical purposes. Nathu declines saying he has never killed a pig before and doesn't have the necessary skill for it, offering instead to tan the hide if required provided the people from the piggery kill it. Thekedar insists and gives Nathu 5 rupees and leaves the shop saying by morning the jamadar will come to take the carcass.

Early next morning Bakshiji and a few members of the political party go to a Muslim mohalla to clean drains as propaganda, singing patriotic songs. They're received at the mohalla warmly and are joined in by the residents in cleaning the drains. Later they are confronted by an old Muslim and asked to leave for their own good. Soon stones fly at the party members from neighboring houses and they flee the scene. Party members then discover that someone has thrown a pig carcass at the steps of a mosque.

Fearing unrest in the community, Bakshiji and Hayat Baksh, the spokesman of the Muslim League, visit the Deputy Commissioner Richard at his house and urge him to take preemptive measures to bring the situation under control. Richard declines the suggestions of Bakshiji and Hayat Baksh to deploy police or impose a curfew and instead tells the party members to urge their respective communities to maintain peace and order.

Nathu having seen the pig carcass at the mosque and having witnessed slight unrest in the town, wonders whether it was the same pig he had killed last night. While returning home in the evening he sees the thekedar in the street. Nathu tries to approach him but the thekedar rushes off hurriedly. Now sure that it was the same pig, Nathu feels terribly guilty and goes home and confesses it all to his pregnant wife Kammo. Outside at a distance they see burning houses and Nathu blames himself for the erupting communal violence.

Sensing danger, Nathu decides to leave the city with his wife and mother. They start off on foot, Nathu carrying his old crippled mother on his back. During the travel Nathu's mother dies and has to be burned in the forest without proper funeral rites which further devastates the conscience-stricken Nathu who in his naivety holds himself responsible for the holocaust.

In a nearby village Harnam Singh and his wife Banto are the only Sikh family. They too are planning to go to their daughter Jasbir's house in a Sikh village. They travel on foot all night and the next morning reach a village and knock a door seeking shelter. The house belongs to a Muslim, Ehsan Ali, who has been a friend of Harnam Singh since long. Harnam Singh and Banto hide at the house during the day, but at night are discovered by Ehsan's son and are asked to leave immediately. On their way the next morning they meet Nathu and his wife in the forest and they all go together to a gurudwara where Jasbir and several other Sikhs have taken shelter.

At the gurudwara Teja Singh, the leader of the Sikh council, informs the Sikhs that Muslims are continually collecting arms and Sikhs should do the same. Later that night a junior granthi comes to the gurudwara and informs Teja Singh that the Muslims know that the Sikhs are out numbered and not sufficiently armed, so they're demanding 2 lakh rupees for truce. Teja Singh and the Sikh council deem the amount too much and send the granthi and Nathu to negotiate with the Muslims. Teja Singh and the council members watch from the terrace of the gurudwara as Nathu and the granthi are approached by the Muslim mob, surrounded and attacked. Sikhs enraged by this take up arms and go out to fight shouting Sikh slogans. Back at the gurudwara Jasbir leads the Sikh women to a collective suicide by jumping into a well, some with their children in their arms.

Richard is later shown addressing prominent figures of the city where he informs the gathering about the relief measures taken by the government and proposes the leaders to form an Aman Committee to send out a message of peace. Bakshiji and Hayat Baksh are made vice presidents of Aman Committee. At the conclusion of the meeting the thekedar is seen shouting communal harmony slogans.

Harnam Singh, Banto, and Kammo are at the refugee camp. Harnam Singh requests a government employee to help find Nathu who hasn't been seen since he went with the junior granthi for negotiating with the Muslims. The employee suggests they inquire at the hospital tent where he might've been admitted had he been found in the city. Kammo looks through the dead bodies lying in a row on the ground and identifying Nathu's dead body among them, she collapses, crying. She goes into labor immediately and is taken into the hospital tent by nurses. Harnam Singh and Banto sitting outside the tent hear the newborn's cries from inside the tent mixed with slogans of "Allahu Akbar" and "Har Har Mahadev" coming from a distance.

== Cast ==
- Om Puri as Nathu
- Deepa Sahi as Karmo
- Uttara Baokar as Jasbir
- Amrish Puri as Sardar Teja Singh
- A.K. Hangal as Bakshi ji
- Manohar Singh as Hayat Baksh
- Bhisham Sahni as Harnam Singh
- Dina Pathak as Banto
- K. K. Raina as Mirdad
- Iftekhar as Ehsan Ali
- Surekha Sikri as Rajo
- Pankaj Kapur as Thekedaar
- Saeed Jaffrey as Karim Khan
- Barry John as Richard
- Karen Smith as Liza
- K.K. Raina as Socialist Comrade
- Surendra Pal as Shah Nawaz
- Virendra Saxena as Jarnail
- Pinchoo Kapoor as Dilawar
- Akash Khurana as Dr. Kapoor
- Harish Patel as Karada

== Production ==
=== Development ===
The film was based on the namesake Hindi novel by Bhisham Sahni, who himself was an immigrant from Pakistan. The novel was published in 1974 and won the Sahitya Akademi Award the following year. While working as a second-unit director in Richard Attenborough's biographical film Gandhi, Nihalani came across the book while visiting a book store in Delhi. He was drawn towards it by the title Tamas (lit. Darkness). After going through a few pages, he came to know that it was about the partition. Being a refugee himself who had come to India after the partition, he claimed that he desperately wanted to make a film based on the event. Though he had read books that focus on the event like Jhootha Sach, which he felt was "huge" and "intimidating", it was not until he read Tamas he had the courage to make a film based on the event. Sahni who had seen Nihalani's Aakrosh was confident that the latter could make a film based on his novel.

=== Casting and filming ===
Bhisham Sahni gave an introduction to the film in addition to being cast in a pivotal role opposite Dina Pathak. Subsequently, Nihalani hand-picked Amrish Puri, A. K. Hangal, Om Puri, Pankaj Kapur stating that almost all of these were young at the time of partition and had known very well about the event. Deepa Sahi, Surekha Sikri and Barry John were signed up for other important roles. Om Puri who was cast in the lead role, was asked to lose weight and grow a beard for his character. There was a scene in the film where he had to kill a pig.

Nihalani originally wanted to shoot the film in Punjab, Pakistan, but owing to terrorist attacks the film was shot in Mumbai. Nihalani stated that he had a tough time to find the producers until he met Lalit Bijlani of Blaze Films, who immediately agreed upon to produce the film despite Nihalani warning him of the controversies that the story had.

== Release ==
The film was aired as a six-part television series through Doordarshan and became extremely popular from its very first episode. Upon release, the film stirred a lot of controversies as it was set in the backdrop of religious violence. The Hyderabad office of Doordarshan was attacked. Nihalani received threats from unknown people and was placed under police protection for a period of eight weeks. On 21 January 1988, the Bombay High Court issued a stay to prevent further screening of the series after hearing a petition from the city-based businessman Javed Siddiqui who in his plea stated that the serial "would poison the minds of the people". Two days later, however, the court overruled the stay in favour of the series stating that it treated the "fundamentalists" in both communities equally. The court further added "The message is loud and clear [...] directed as it is against the sickness of communalism, the extremists stand exposed when realisation dawns on both communities who ultimately unite as brothers." The series was later released in theatres as a one-off four-hour-long feature film. In August 2013, the film was re-telecast as an eight-part series by History TV18 as a part of the Independence Day celebrations.

== Awards ==
Award	Ceremony	Category	Nominee	Outcome
National Film Awards	1988	Nargis Dutt Award for Best Feature Film on National Integration	Govind Nihalani	Won
National Film Awards	1988	Best Supporting Actress	Surekha Sikri	Won
National Film Awards	1988	Best Music Direction	Vanraj Bhatia	Won

== See also ==
- Artistic depictions of the Partition of India
