= Celebration (Tyeb Mehta) =

Triptych by Tyeb Mehta

- Artist: Tyeb Mehta
- Year: b.1925
- Medium: Acrylic on canvas
- Dimensions: 240.0 cm × 510.0 cm (94.5 in × 202.5 in)
- Location: Private collection

Celebration is a triptych painting by Tyeb Mehta. It sold at Christie's for 15 million Indian rupees (US$300,000) in 2002, the highest price a contemporary Indian piece of art has ever sold for in a public auction.
