= Avadhanam Sita Raman =

Indian writer and journalist

- Born: 9 April 1919; Proddatur, Kadapa district, Andhra Pradesh, India
- Died: 24 June 2001 (aged 82); Chennai, Tamil Nadu, India
- Occupations: Journalist, writer
- Awards: Padma Shri (2001); Fellow of Lalit Kala Akademi (1993)

Avadhanam Sita Raman (9 April 1919 – 24 June 2001) was an Indian writer and journalist and a former editor of the Illustrated Weekly of India. Born on 9 April 1919 at Proddatur in Kadapa district in the South Indian state of Andhra Pradesh, he secured his master's degree in economics from the Andhra University College of Arts and Commerce, Waltair. He started his career in 1936 as a writer and journalist with freelance contributions to English and Telugu publications such as Triveni, a literary and cultural quarterly. Later, in 1943, he joined the Hindustan Times in the capacity of a sub editor, moved on to publications such as The Statesman and The Times of India before joining the Illustrated Weekly of India in 1953, and rose to the rank of Editor, the first Indian editor of the weekly. He also worked as an art consultant to The Studio, an arts magazine published from London. At the end of the seventies, he joined Swarajya, a Madras-based weekly magazine.

A former dean of the Faculty of Art at the Tamil University, Thanjavur, Raman was elected as the Fellow of Lalit Kala Akademi in 1993. He was also honored by the Government of India, in 2001, with the fourth highest Indian civilian award of Padma Shri. He died on 24 June 2001.

== See also ==
- Illustrated Weekly of India
- The Studio (magazine)
- Tamil University
- Swarajya (magazine)
