= Jeram Patel =

Indian artist

Jeram Patel (20 June 1930 — 18 January 2016) born in Sojitra, Gujarat, was an Indian artist. He was known for using blowtorches on woodwork medium in a method that he learned in Japan and then pioneered in India. Jeram was part of a group of an artists called Group 1890. Patel was known as an abstractionist. He received National Award from the Lalit Kala Akademi in 1957, 1963, 1973, and 1984.

== Early life and education ==
Patel studied at JJ School of Art, Mumbai and studied Typography and Publicity Design at Central School of Art and Crafts, London. Eventually, he also taught as a faculty member at MS University, Baroda. He worked as graphic design consultant with National Institute of Design, Ahmedabad in 1962.

== Exhibitions ==
He has had 37 Solo exhibitions in India and abroad as of 2006.

- The dark loam: between memory and membrane hosted at KNMA in October 2016
- India's Indigenous Modernism with other artists

== Death ==
He died at an age of 86 in 2016 at a hospital in Vadodara where he was admitted for 15 days following a severe cold and congestion.
