= Indian and Foreign Review =

The Indian and Foreign Review was an official publication of the Government of India published by the Ministry of Information and Broadcasting, between 1963 and 1988. It replaced March of India.

== See also ==
- The Gazette of India
