= Bombay Art Society =

- Formation: 1888; 138 years ago
- Type: Art Organisation
- Purpose: Art Promotion
- Location: Bandra Reclamation, Bandra West, Mumbai
- Coordinates: 19.051725°N 72.832775°E
- Website: www.bombayartsociety.org

The Bombay Art Society is a non-profit art organization based in Mumbai (Bombay). The institution was founded in 1888 for encouraging and promoting art. Most of the renowned artists on India's art scene have been associated with the Bombay Art Society in some way.

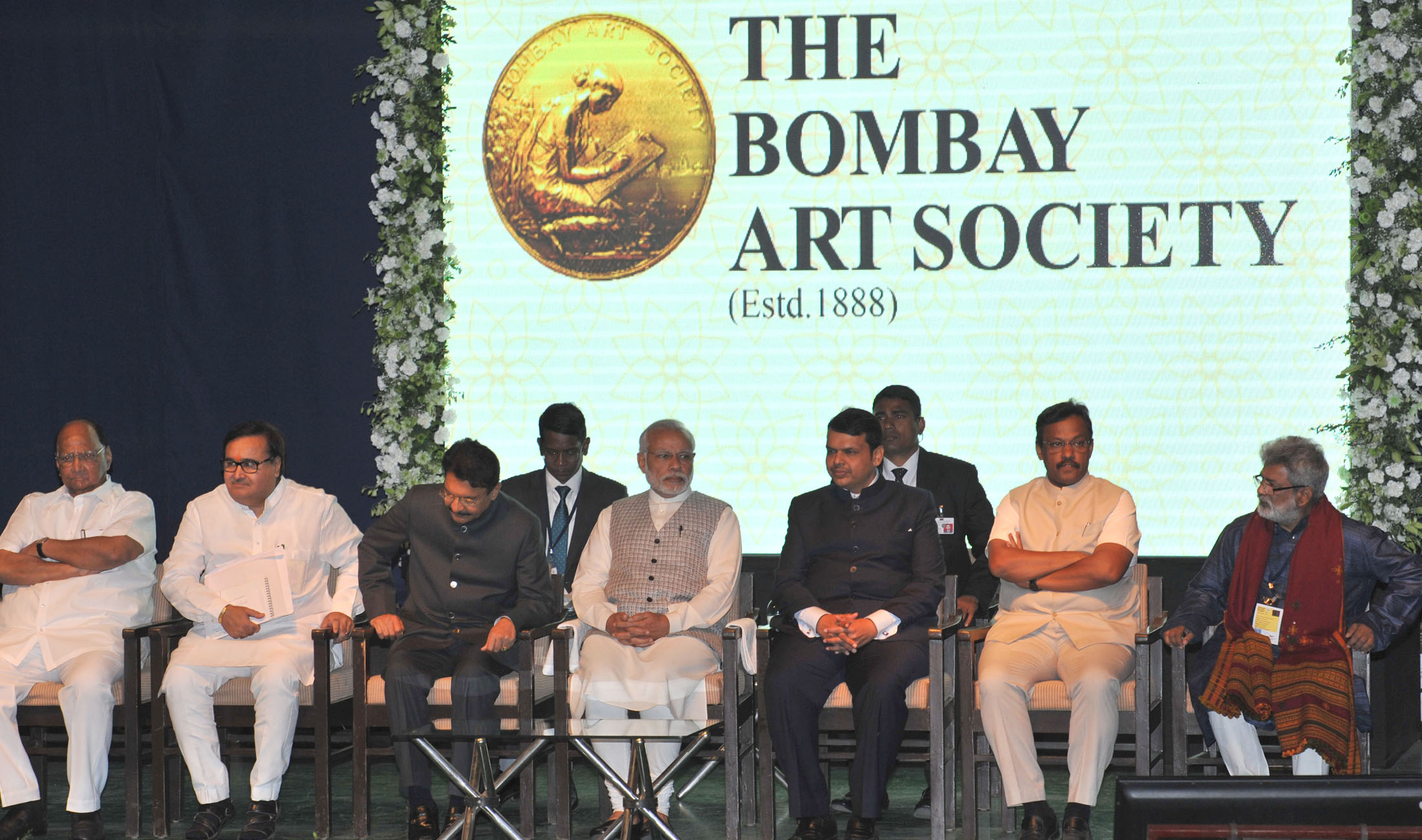
The Prime Minister, Shri Narendra Modi at the Bombay Art Society, in Mumbai on February 13, 2016. The Governor of Maharashtra, Shri C. Vidyasagar Rao and the Chief Minister of Maharashtra, Shri Devendra Fadnavis and others are also seen.

== History ==
For some five or six years after the foundation of the Society in 1888, the Exhibits of the European Artists preponderated over those of the Indian Artists as shown by the catalogues of the Annual Exhibitions. This was natural as The Sir J.J. School of Art was then in its first stages of development, but in course of time as taste for the acquisition of art as a profession was developed under able Principals of the School of Art, like Messrs. Terry, and Griffiths, and by the publicity given to Indian Artists by the Bombay Art Society, the School of Art produced a band of Indian Artists. The number of works by Indian Artists exhibited in subsequent years at the Society's Annual Exhibition later considerably increased, while under British Rule.

== Advancements ==
The society has operated in the Jehangir Art Gallery since 1952, which is also the regular venue for the Society's Annual Exhibitions. During the Society's Centenary year in 1990 veteran artist and the then president of the Society K. K. Hebbar and the committee took the initiative for the complex. The then Chief Minister of Maharashtra Shri Sharad Pawar through has given a piece of land in Bandra, Mumbai for the Society's complex which is now ready.

The Bombay Art Society's Art Complex houses three Exhibition Galleries, Auditorium and Art Books Library. The Art Galleries are rented on weekly basis at affordable charges to Artists and Art Institutions for Exhibitions.

A number of awards and medals are given by the society. The Bendre-Husain Scholarship for encouraging and supporting emerging artists, instituted in 1989/1990, was donated by artist M.F. Husain. Recipients of the Roopadhar award for lifetime achievement include Sadanand Bakre (2004) and Tyeb Mehta (2007).

== Architecture and design ==
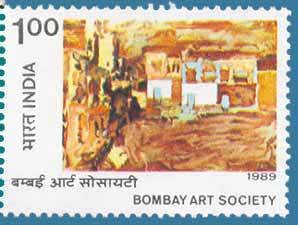
Indian Postage Stamp depicting Bombay Art Society, 1989

The building designed on the lines of Cubist sculptures and resembling European expressionist architecture, house three galleries.

== Managing committee 2021-2026 ==
- Rajendra N Patil - President
- Manoj Joshi - Vice-President
- Prof. Narendra Vichare - Chairman
- Chandrajit Yadav - Secretary
- Ajinkya Chaulkar - Joint Secretary
- Surendra Jagtap - Treasurer
- Prof. Anil Naik
- Ajinkya Chaulkar
- Vikrant Manjrekar
- Ganpat Bhadke
- Madhavi Gangan
- Shrikant Kadam
- Vielas Salunkke
- Anil Abhange
