= S. H. Raza =

Indian painter

Sayed Haider Raza LH
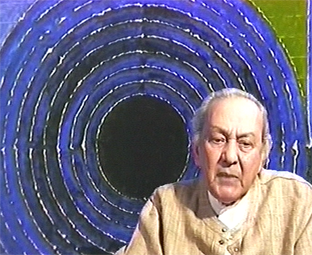
- Born: 22 February 1922; Kakkaiya, Mandla, Central Provinces and Berar (now in Madhya Pradesh, India)
- Died: 23 July 2016 (aged 94); Delhi, India
- Education: • Chitrakala Mahavidyalaya, Nagpur • Sir J. J. School of Art
- Movement: Bombay Progressive Artists' Group
- Awards: Padma Vibhushan (2013); Padma Bhushan (2007); Fellow of Lalit Kala Academy (1984); Padma Shri (1981); Commandeur de la Legion d'honneur (2015)
- Website: therazafoundation.org

Sayed Haider Raza LH (22 February 1922 – 23 July 2016) was an Indian painter who lived and worked in France for most of his career. He moved to France in 1950, marrying the French artist Janine Mongillat in 1959. Following her death from cancer in 2002, Raza returned to India in 2010, where he would live until his death six years later.

Having maintained strong ties with India throughout his career, Raza was an acclaimed for his art both there and in France. He was awarded the Padma Shri in 1981, Fellowship of the Lalit Kala Academi in 1984, Padma Bhushan in 2007, and Padma Vibhushan in 2013. He was conferred with the Commandeur de la Légion d'honneur (Legion of Honour) on 14 July 2015.

His seminal work Saurashtra sold for ₹16.42 crore ($3,486,965) at a Christie's auction in 2010.

== Early life and education ==
Sayed Haider Raza was born in Kakkaiya, Mandla district, Madhya Pradesh, to Sayed Mohammed Razi, the Deputy Forest Ranger of the district, and Tahira Begum. It was here that he spent his early years, completed primary education, and took to drawing at the age of 12. He moved to Damoh (also in Madhya Pradesh) at 13; where he completed his high school education from Government High School, Damoh.

After high school, he studied further at the Nagpur School of Art, Nagpur (1939–43), and Sir J. J. School of Art, Mumbai (1943–47), before moving to France in October 1950 to study at the École Nationale supérieure des Beaux-Arts (ENSB-A), Paris (1950-1953) on a Government of France scholarship. After his studies, he traveled across Europe, and continued to live and exhibit his work in Paris. He was later awarded the Prix de la critique in Paris in 1956, becoming the first non-French artist to receive the honor.

== Art career ==
=== Early career ===
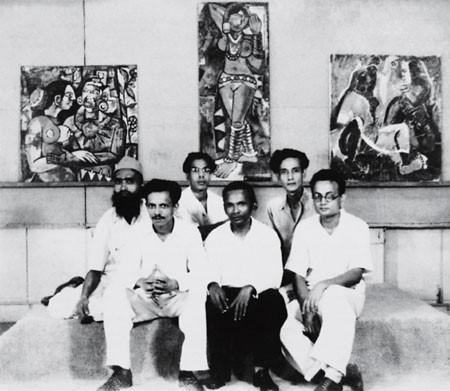
The Bombay Progressive Artists group

Sayed Haider Raza had his first solo show when he was 24 in 1946 at Bombay Art Society Salon, and was awarded the Silver Medal of the society.

His work evolved from painting expressionistic landscapes to abstract ones. From his fluent watercolours of landscapes and townscapes executed in the early 1940s, he moved toward a more expressive language, painting landscapes of the mind.

Raza carefully crafted his career to become an inspiration to two generations of artists. The year of 1947 proved to be a very important year for him. First, his mother died. Then, he co-founded the revolutionary Bombay Progressive Artists' Group (PAG) (1947–1956) along with K. H. Ara and F. N. Souza. This group set out to break free from the influences of European realism in Indian art and bring Indian inner vision (Antar gyan) into the art. The group had its first show in 1948. A revolutionary amount of art was created by the people in this group from 1940 to 1990. Raza's father died the same year his mother had died in Mandla. The majority of his four brothers and sister, migrated to Pakistan, after the partition of India. In the early years, the group continued its close rapport. Krishen Khanna speaks of the first exhibition Raza, Akbar Padamsee and F. N. Souza mounted together at the Gallery Cruz in Paris. "Souza and Padamsee painted in a quasi-modern fashion. Raza, however, made a throwback to the Mughal period, creating jewel-like watercolours, with the pigment rubbed in with a shell. He was vastly successful and acquired by important collectors."

Once in France, he continued to experiment with currents of Western Modernism, moving from Expressionist modes towards greater abstraction and eventually incorporating elements of Tantrism from Indian scriptures. Whereas his fellow contemporaries dealt with more figural subjects, Raza chose to focus on landscapes in the 1940s and 50s, inspired in part by a move to France. In 1956, he was awarded the prestigious Prix de la Critique, this was a monumental award to the art scene in India.

In 1962, he became a visiting lecturer at the University of California, Berkeley. Raza was initially enamored of the bucolic countryside of rural France. Eglise is part of a series which captures the rolling terrain and quaint village architecture of this region. Showing a tumultuous church engulfed by an inky blue night sky, Raza uses gestural brushstrokes and a heavily impasto-ed application of paint, stylistic devices which hint at his later 1970s abstractions.

=== The "Bindu" and beyond ===
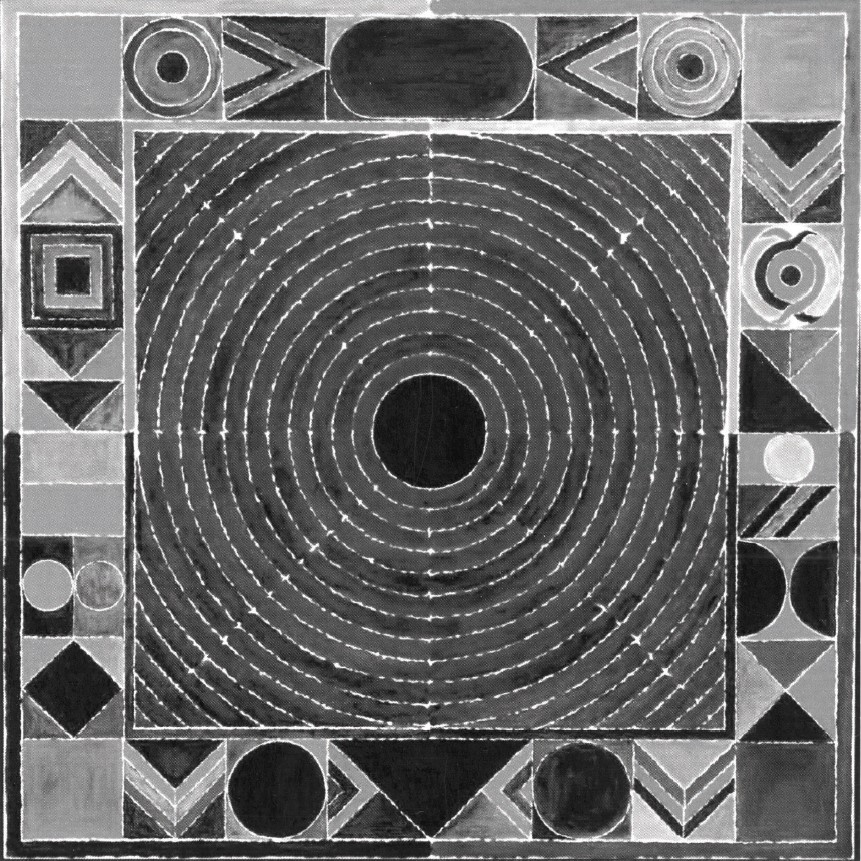
Black Sun based on Bindu by S. H. Raza

By the 1970s Raza had grown increasingly unhappy and restless with his own work and wanted to find a new direction and deeper authenticity in his work, and move away from what he called the 'plastic art'. His trips to India, especially to caves of Ajanta - Ellora, followed by those to Varanasi, Gujarat and Rajasthan, made him realize his role and study Indian culture more closely, the result was "Bindu", which signified his rebirth as a painter. The Bindu came forth in 1980, and took his work deeper and brought in, his new-found Indian vision and Indian ethnography. One of the reasons he attributes to the origin of the "Bindu", have been his elementary school teacher, who on finding him lacking adequate concentration, drew a dot on the blackboard and asked him to concentrate on it. The "Bindu" is related to Indian philosophy of being the point of all creation. The reason this interested Raza so much is because he was looking for new inspiration for his art and this created a new point of creation for himself.

After the introduction of "BUNDU" (a point or the source of energy), he added newer dimensions to his thematic oeuvre in the following decades, with the inclusion of themes around the Tribhuj (Triangle), which bolstered Indian concepts of space and time, as well as that of "prakriti-purusha" (the cosmic substance and the energy or the spirit respectively), his transformation from an expressionist to a master of abstraction and profundity, was complete. His multiple works of art with the bindu is what truly tied him to his Indian roots and culture. This art created a sense of pride for his culture. The bindu is now widely regarded as a trademark for Raza and he said in 2010 that "It's the centre of my life".

"My work is my own inner experience and involvement with the mysteries of nature and form which is expressed in colour, line, space and light".
- S. H. Raza

Raza abandoned the expressionistic landscape for a geometric abstraction and the "Bindu". Raza perceived the Bindu as the center of creation and existence progressing towards forms and color as well as energy, sound, space and time.

His work took another leap in 2000, when he began to express his increasingly deepened insights and thoughts on Indian spiritual, and created works around the Kundalini, Nagas, and the Mahabharat.

== Public contributions ==
For the promotion of art among Indian youth, he established the Raza Foundation in India which gives the Annual Raza Foundation Award to young artists in India. The Raza Foundation in France, based in the artist village of Gorbio, runs the Estate of Sayed Haider Raza.

== Later years and death ==
In 2011, a few years after the death of his wife, S.H. Raza decided to move back from France to New Delhi, where he continued to work several hours a day up until his death on 22 July 2016, at the age of 94. His last wish, to be laid to rest in his hometown Mandla beside his father's grave, was fulfilled. He was buried in Mandla city's cemetery.

== Awards ==
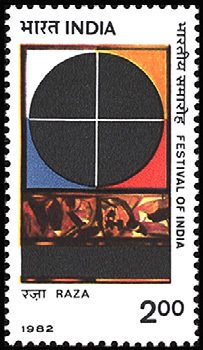
Raza Painting on Indian Postage stamp, 1982

- 1946: Silver Medal, Bombay Art Society, Mumbai
- 1948: Gold Medal, Bombay Art Society, Mumbai
- 1956: Prix de la critique, Paris
- 1981: Padma Shri; the Government of India
- 1984: Fellowship of the Lalit Kala Akademi, New Delhi
- 1992–1993: Kalidas Samman, Government of Madhya Pradesh
- 2004: Lalit Kala Ratna Puraskar, Lalit Kala Academy, New Delhi
- 2007: Padma Bhushan; the Government of India
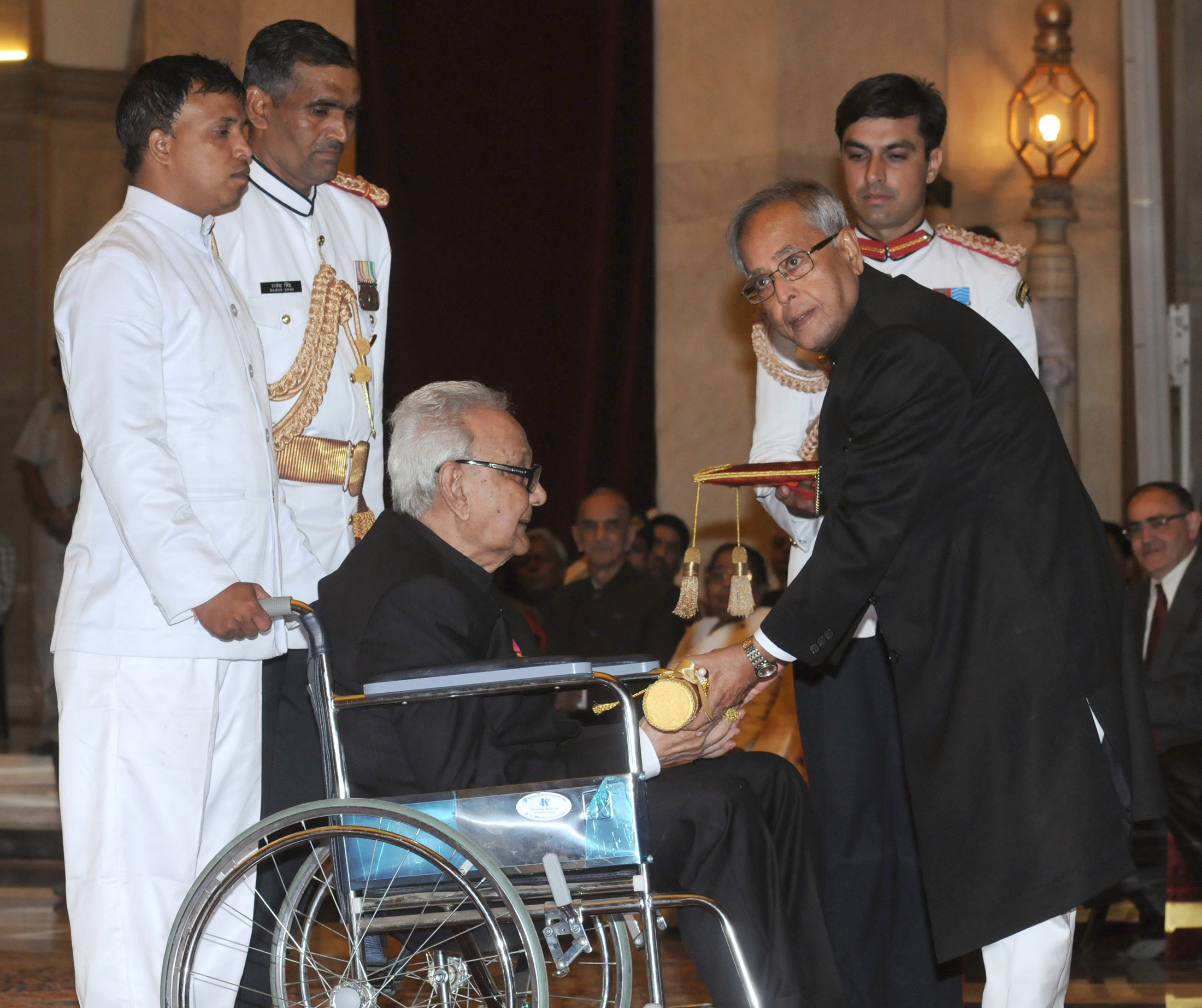
  Raza receiving Padma Vibhushan from then President Pranab Mukherjee in 2013
- 2013: Padma Vibhushan; the Government of India
- 2013: one of the greatest living global Indian legends ... NDTV INDIA
- 2014: D. Litt (Honoris Causa), Indira Kala Sangit Vishwavidyalaya, Khairagarh, Chhattisgarh
- 2015: Commandeur de la Légion d’Honneur (the Legion of Honour); Republic of France
- 2015: D. Litt (Honoris Causa), Shiv Nadar University, Greater Noida, Uttar Pradesh

== Solo exhibitions ==
- 2016; Nirantar, Delhi, Mumbai and Kolkata
- 2015: Galerie Lara Vincy, Paris, "Raza: Paintings"
- 2015: Akar Prakar, Kolkata, "Aarambh – Raza at 93"
- 2015: Art Musings, Mumbai, "Aarambh @ 93: Solo Show of SH Raza"
- 2014: Grosvenor Vadehra, London, "SH Raza – Pyaas"
- 2014: Sovereign FZE, Dubai, "Raza: Paysage, Select Works 1950s – 1970s"
- 2014: Vadehra Art Gallery, New Delhi, "SH Raza - Parikrama – Around Gandhi"
- 2013: Akar Prakar, Kolkata, "Shabd- bindu – A show of recent works by SH Raza & poetry by Ashok Vajpeyi"
- 2013: Vadehra Art Gallery, New Delhi, "Antardhwani"
- 2012: ICIA, The Art Trust, Mumbai, "SH Raza – Solo Show"
- 2012: Art Musings, Mumbai, "SH Raza: Vistaar"
- 2012: Grosvenor Gallery, London, "Bindu Vistaar"
- 2011: Vadehra Art Gallery & Lalit Kala Akademi, New Delhi, "SH Raza, Punaraagman"
- 2010: Flora Jansem Gallery, Raza Ceramiques, Paris
- 2010: Galerie Patrice Trigano, Paris, "Sayed Haider Raza, Œuvres 1950-2001"
- 2010: Akar Prakar Art Gallery, Kolkata, Ahmadabad, Jaipur, Delhi, INDIA in 2010
- 2010: Vadehra Art Gallery, New Delhi, "Recent Works – SH Raza"
- 2008: Art Alive Art Gallery, Delhi, India in 2008
- Exhibition Magnificent Seven at Art Alive Gallery
- 2007: Ayran Art Gallery, Mumbai, New Delhi, Hong Kong, "SH Raza - Celebrating 85 Years of living Legend"
- 2007: RL Fine ARTS, New York, "SH Raza: Master of Colors – Selected Works"
- 2007: The Arts Trust at the ICIA, Mumbai, "SH Raza- Solo Show"
- 2007: National Gallery of Modern Art, New Delhi, "Swati – S.H. Raza"
- 2006: TAO Art Gallery, Mumbai, "Rang Ras – S.H. Raza"
- 2006: RL Fine Arts, New York, SH Raza: Selected Works
- 2006: Vadehra Art Gallery, New Delhi, "Raza"
- 2006: Hong Kong, Aryan Art Gallery, "Raza: Metamorphosis"
- 2005: Aryan Art Gallery, New Delhi, "Raza – Recent Works"
- 2005: Saffronart & Berkeley Square Gallery, London & New York, "SH Raza: Summer 2005"
- 2004: Art Musings, Mumbai, "SH Raza"
- 2003: Berlin, The Fine Art Resource, "SH Raza: Paintings from 1996 to 2003"
- 2001: Delhi Art Gallery, New Delhi, "Mindscapes: The Sacred Search: a select collection of works from 1951- 2002 by Raza"
- 1999: Gallery 54, New York, "Raza"
- 1997: Roopankar Museum of Fine Arts, Bharat Bhavan, Bhopal
- 1997: Jehangir Art Gallery Mumbai
- 1997: National Gallery of Modern Art, New Delhi.
- 1997: Vadhera Art Gallery & Chemould Gallery, Bhopal, Mumbai & New Delhi, "Raza: Avartan 1991-1996"
- 1994: The Art Rental Corporate, Group Michael Ferrier, Échirolles, Grenoble
- 1992: Jehangir Nicholson Museum, National Centre for Performing Arts, Mumbai
- 1992: Courses Arts Lalouvesc, France
- 1991: Gallery Eterso, Cannes, "Bindu ou la quête de l'essentiel", 28 June – 17 August
- 1991: Palais de Carnolès, Musée des Beaux-Arts, Menton, "Raza: Rétrospective 1952-1991"
- 1991: Chemould Gallery, Bombay, "Raza Anthology 1980-1990"
- 1988: Chemould Gallery, Bombay; Koloritten Galleri, Stavanger, Norway
- 1987: The Head of the artist, Grenoble
- 1985: Galerie Pierre Parat, Paris
- 1984: Chemould Gallery, Bombay
- 1982: Gallery Loeb, Bern, Switzerland; Gallery JY Noblet, Grenoble
- 1980: Galleriet, Oslo
- 1976: Mumbai, Gallery Chemould at the Jehangir Art Gallery, Raza, 26 February – 1 March 1976.
- 1975: Sanremo, Galleria Matuzia, Raza, 4 – 31 October 1975.
- 1969: Paris, Galerie Lara Vincy, Raza: Peintures Recentes, 27 November 1969 – 5 January 1970.
- 1968: Bombay, Gallery Chemould, Raza, 15 – 27 April 1968.
- 1968: Toronto, Gallery Dresdnere, Raza – Recent Oil Paintings, 25 October – 9 November 1968.
- 1968: Cologne, Dom Galerie, Sayed Haider Raza, 26 March – 4 May 1968.
- 1967: Paris, Galerie Lara Vincy, 1967.
- 1966: Düsseldorf, Tecta Galerie, Raza – Paris: 25 Oil Paintings from 1962- 1966, 6 October – 10 November 1966.
- 1963 Cologne, Dom Galerie, Raza, June – July 1963.
- 1964: Paris, Galerie Lara Vincy, Raza: Peintures récentes, 18 November 1964 – 10 January 1965.
- 1962: Galerie Dresdnere, Montreal
- 1962: Galerie Lara Vincy, Paris, Raza, 15 July 1962.
- 1961: Paris, Galerie Lara Vincy, Raza, 19 April- 18 May 1961.
- 1960: Montreal, Galerie Dresdnere, Autumn 1960.
- 1959: Montreal, Galerie Dresdnere, Raza: Peintures et Gouaches, 5th – 19th MAY 1959.
- 1958: Galerie Lara Vincy, Paris, "Raza - Prix de la Critique 1956. Peintures et gouaches" (April–May)
- 1956: Galerie Saint-Placide, Paris, "Raza"
- 1950: Charles Petrat's Institute of foreign Languages, Mumbai (September)
- 1950: The IFL International Centre, Bombay, "SH Raza: Farewell Exhibition of Paintings" (September)
- 1948: Exhibition Hall, New Delhi, "Raza: 100 paintings of Kashmir", organised by Rudolf Von Leyden, (September)
- 1947: Bombay Art Society, "Raza's Watercolour Landscapes", (November)
- 1946: First solo exhibition at the Bombay Art Society Salon

== Selected Biennales ==
- 1956: Venice Biennale, Italy.
- 1957: Biennale 57, Pavillon de Marsan, Paris, France.
- 1958: Bienal de São Paulo, Brazil.
- 1958: Biennale, Brussels, Belgium.
- 1958: Biennale of Young Contemporary Painters, Bruges, Belgium.
- 1958: Venice Biennale, Italy.
- 1961: Biennale of Tokyo, Japan.
- 1962: Salon Comparaisons, Paris, France.
- 1963: Biennale du Maroc, Rabat, Morocco.
- 1964: Biennale de Menton, France.
- 1966: Biennale de Menton, France.
- 1966: Salon Comparaisons, Paris.
- 1968: Biennale de Menton, France.
- 1972: Biennale de Menton, France.
- 1976: Biennale de Menton, France.
- 1978: Biennale de Menton, France.
- 1986: Bienal de la Habana, Havana,
