= Sadanand Bakre =

Indian painter and sculptor (1920–1987)

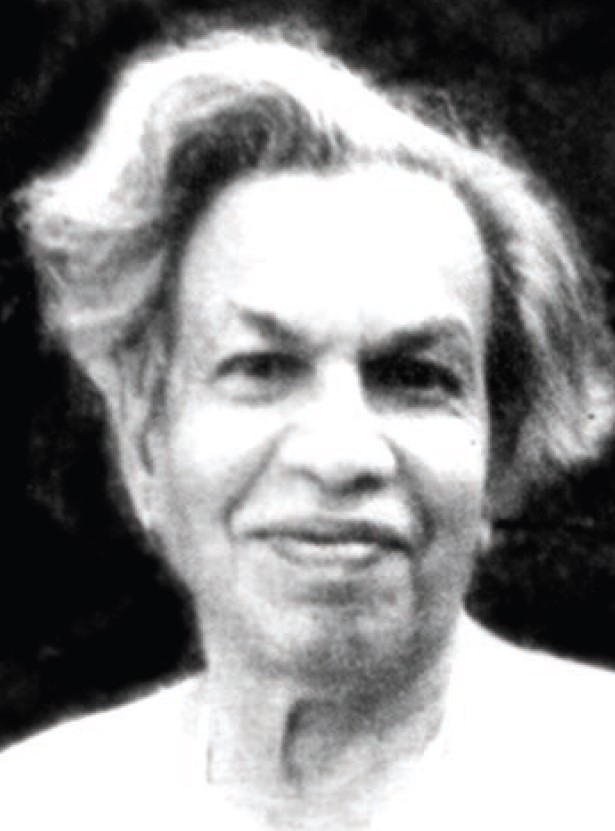
- Born: 10 November 1920; Vadodara, Gujarat
- Died: 18 December 2007 (aged 87); Ratnagiri, Maharashtra
- Known for: Painting; Sculpture
- Movement: Progressive Artists' Group

Sadanand Bakre (S. K. Bakre) (10 November 1920 – 18 December 2007) was an Indian painter and sculptor.

Bakre was born in Baroda, and was one of the founders of the Bombay Progressive Artists' Group, the pioneers of modern art in India. In 1951, he went to Britain, where he soon gave up sculpture and concentrated on painting. He had a one-man exhibition at the Commonwealth Institute (1951), another at Gallery One (1959), and four at the Nicholas Treadwell Gallery (1969–1975).

Bakre returned to India in 1975. In his later years he became a recluse, but he received a lifetime achievement award from the Bombay Art Society in 2004. He died from a heart attack in Murud-Harnai in the Ratnagiri district in 2007.

== Sources ==
- Saffronart
- Ask Art
