= H. A. Gade =

Indian artist (1917–2001)

- Born: 19 August 1917; Amravati, India
- Died: 16 December 2001 (aged 84)
- Occupation: Artist
- Website: http://artisthagade.com/

Hari Ambadas Gade (19 August 1917 – 16 December 2001) was an Indian artist. He is remembered as one of independent India's pioneering abstract expressionist painters.

== Early life and education ==
Gade was born in 1917 at Talegaon Dashasar Village of District Amravati in Maharashtra, India. He studied science at the University of Nagpur where he enrolled in 1939 with the Nagpur School of Art. He taught at Jabalpur's Spencer Training College for five years before completing a Diploma and then a Masters in Art during 1949-50. He later enrolled for a year at the Central Institute of Education, New Delhi in 1958.

== Artistic career ==
Gade began his career doing watercolour landscapes before moving on to oil canvases. As a Progressive Artist, his works reflect a break from the colonial values and styles that had conditioned art education in colonial India. At least one critic has noted that "In [Gade's] works, color is of importance, form is only incidental." Some of Gade works reflect the artist's affectation by the slums and poverty of the Bombay of the 1950s. He did however continue to produce a prodigious and diverse set of landscapes covering themes from Kerala and the Indian monsoons to the arid landscape of Rajasthan's Udaipur.

Gade had an interest in science and mathematics and he read several works by Roger Fry on painting techniques and aesthetics. His works reflect his scientific inclination in their geometrically structured landscapes which are also evocative of the cubists. Some of his notable works include Kashmir, Going to the Temple, Donkeys, Civilization and Omkareshwar. Gade's paintings employ both the palette knife and the paintbrush and he has been referred to as a "painters' painter" on account his innate appreciation of the visual impact of colours.

Gade was one of the six founding members of the Progressive Artists' Group and remained its part until its dissolution in 1956. His works have been exhibited at various venues both in India and abroad including at The Moderns, the inaugural exhibition at the National Gallery of Modern Art, Mumbai. Some of the venues abroad include the Stanford University exhibition (1948), Basel (1951, 1956) and the Venice Biennale (1954). In the late 1950s, he founded the Bombay Group of Artists which had K. K. Hebbar and Bal Chhabda among its members.

== Awards ==
Gade won the Bombay Art Society's gold medal in 1956. He was also feted at the Maharashtra State Art Exhibition and at the Saigon Biennale of 1962.

== Death and legacy ==
Gade died in 2001. Several of his works are with the National Gallery of Modern Art and Lalit Kala Akademi, New Delhi and the Tata Institute of Fundamental Research, Mumbai. Several art galleries across Europe also have his works in their possession.
