= Indian painting =

Indian painting
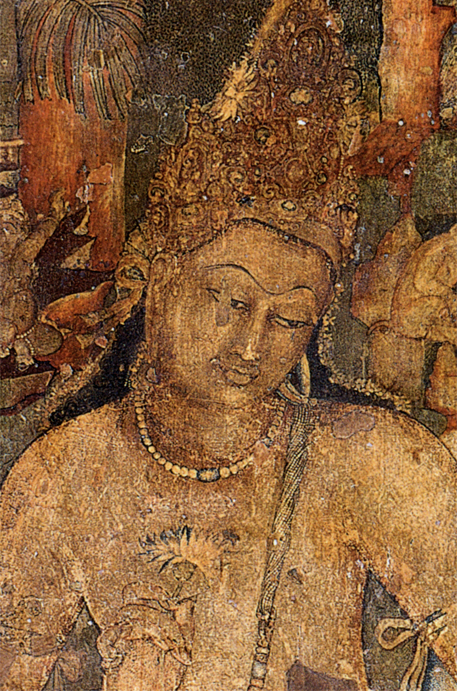
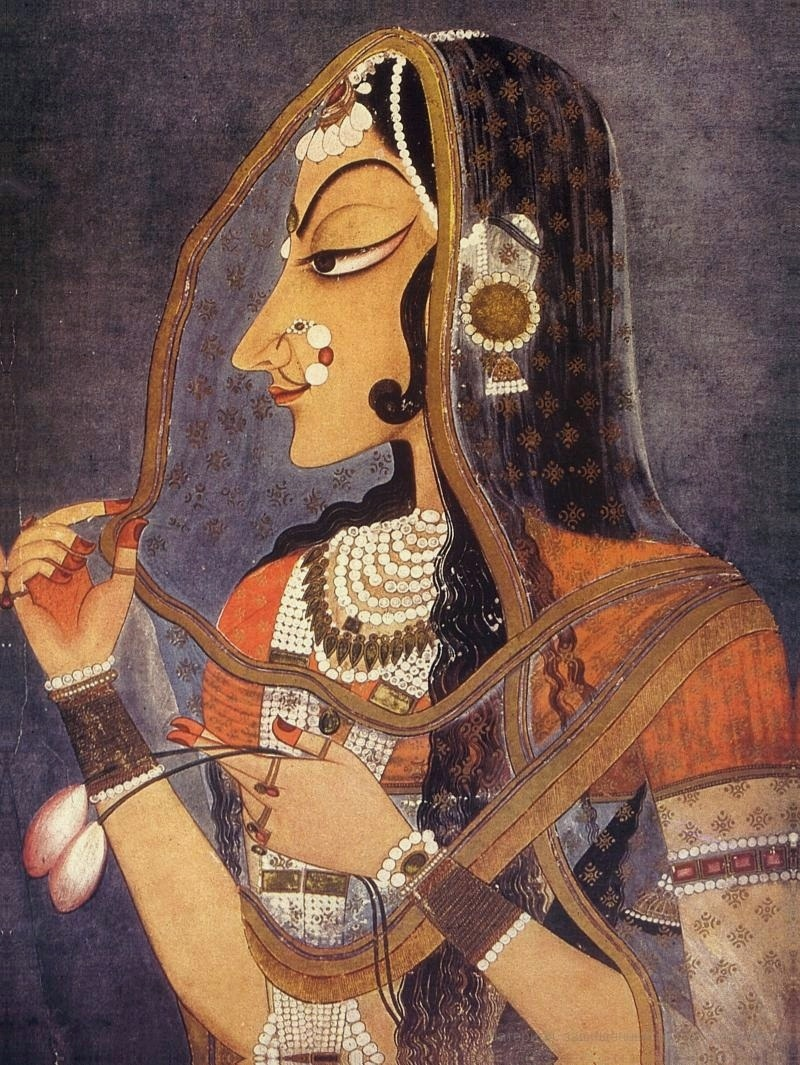
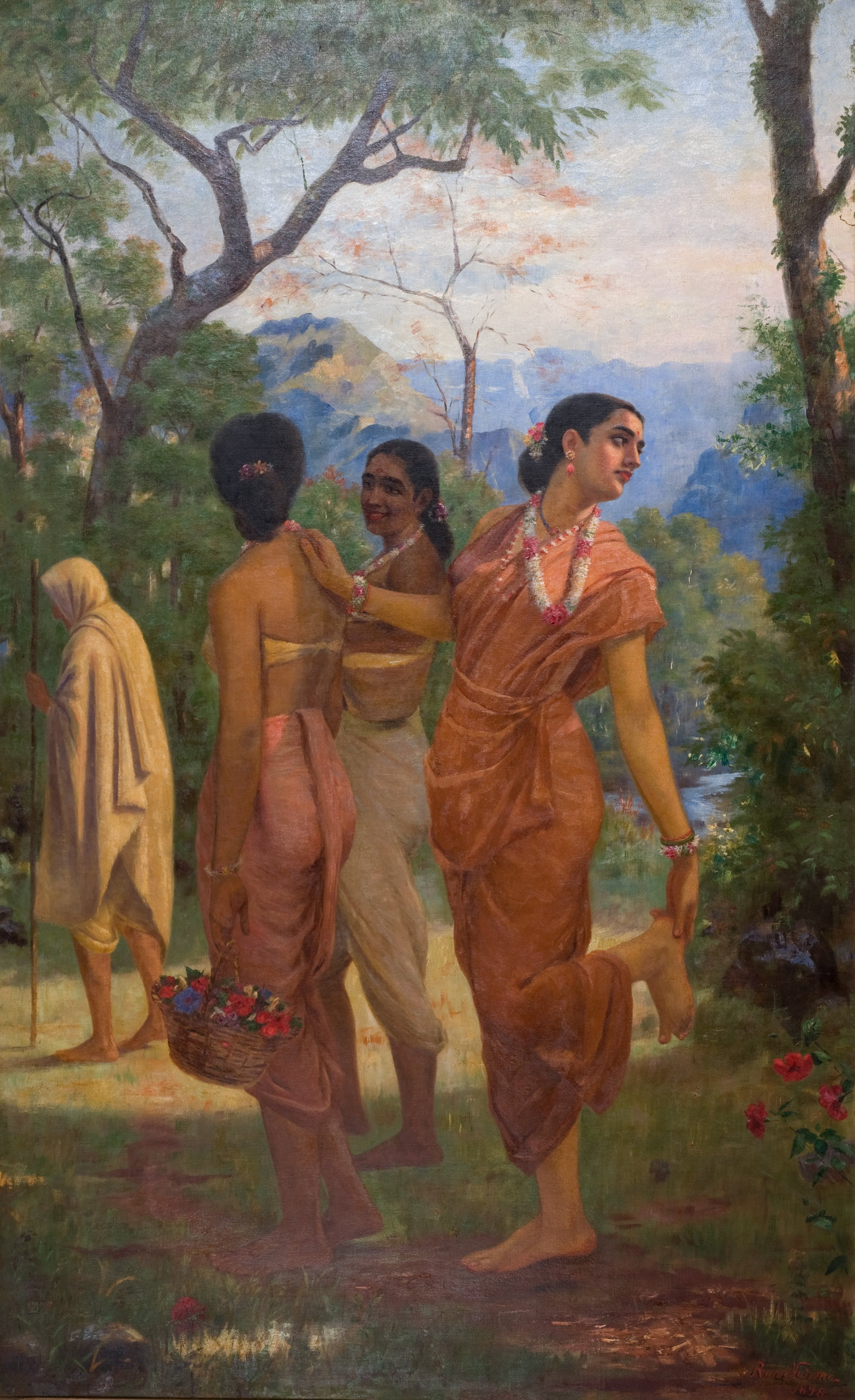
Clockwise from upper left: Ajanta fresco (450), Radha Bani thani (ca. 18th century), Gita Govinda series (1825), Shakuntala (1870)

Indian painting has a very long tradition and history in Indian art. The earliest Indian paintings were the rock paintings of prehistoric times, such as the petroglyphs found in places like the Bhimbetka rock shelters. Some of the Stone Age rock paintings found among the Bhimbetka rock shelters are approximately 10,000 years old. Because of the climatic conditions in the Indian subcontinent, very few early examples survive today.

India's ancient Hindu and Buddhist literature has many mentions of palaces and other buildings decorated with paintings (chitra), but the paintings of the Ajanta Caves are the most significant of the few ones which survive. Smaller scale painting in manuscripts was probably also practised in this period, though the earliest survivals are from the medieval period. A new style emerged in the Mughal era as a fusion of the Persian miniature with older Indian traditions, and from the 17th century its style was diffused across Indian princely courts of all religions, each developing a local style. Company paintings were made for British clients under the British Raj, which from the 19th century also introduced art schools along Western lines. This led to modern Indian painting, which is increasingly returning to its Indian roots.

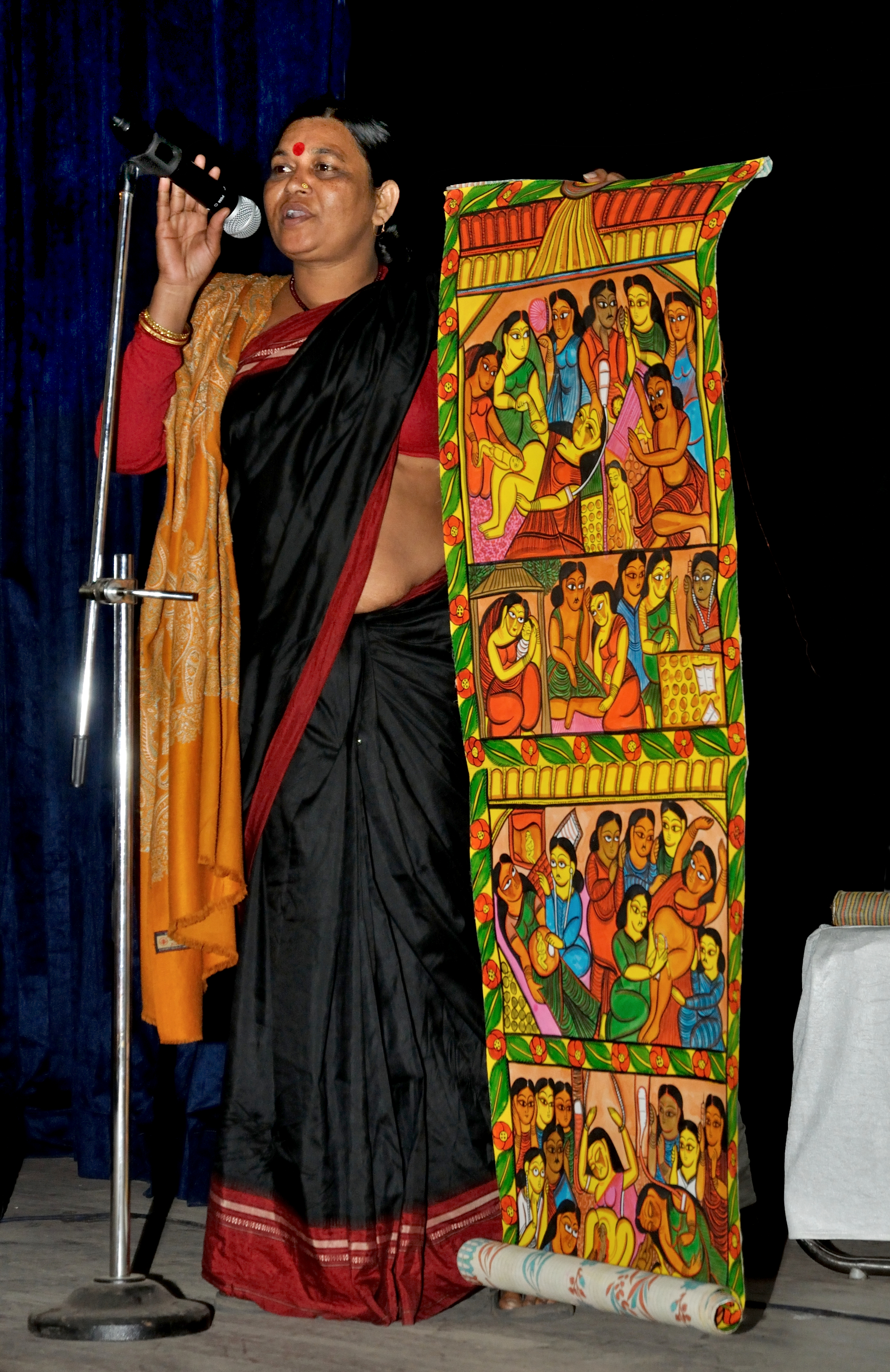
Performance of Patua Sangeet by a Patua, with a pattachitra scroll to illustrate, Kolkata

Indian paintings can be broadly classified as murals, miniatures and paintings on cloth. Murals are large works executed on the walls of solid structures, as in the Ajanta Caves and the Kailashnath temple. Miniature paintings are executed on a very small scale for books or albums on perishable material such as paper and cloth. Traces of murals, in fresco-like techniques, survive in a number of sites with Indian rock-cut architecture, going back at least 2,000 years, but the 1st and 5th-century remains at the Ajanta Caves are much the most significant.

Paintings on cloth were often produced in a more popular context, often as folk art, used for example by travelling reciters of epic poetry, such as the Bhopas of Rajasthan and Chitrakathi elsewhere, and bought as souvenirs of pilgrimages. Very few survivals are older than about 200 years, but it is clear the traditions are much older. Some regional traditions are still producing works.

== Overview of the main genres ==
It seems clear that miniature painting, often illustrating manuscripts, has a very long history, but Jain miniatures from about the 12th century, mostly from West India, and slightly earlier Buddhist ones from the Pala Empire in the east are the oldest to survive. Similar Hindu illustrations survive from about the 15th century in the west, and 16th century in East India, by which time the Mughal miniature under Akbar was also sometimes illustrating translations into Persian of the Hindu epics and other subjects.

The great period of Mughal court painting begins with the return of Humayun from exile in Persia in 1555 and bringing Persian artists with him. It ends during the reign of Aurangzeb who rather disapproved of painting for religious reasons, and disbanded the large imperial workshop, by perhaps 1670. The artists dispersed to smaller princely courts, both Muslim and Hindu, and the "post-Mughal" style developed in many local variants. These included different Rajasthani schools of painting like the Bundi, Kishangarh, Jaipur, Marwar and Mewar. The Ragamala paintings also belong to this school, as does the later Company painting produced for British clients from the mid-18th century.

Modern Indian art has seen the rise of the Bengal School of art in 1930s followed by many forms of experimentations in European and Indian styles. The important artists of Bengal School of Art include Abanindranath Tagore, Nandlal Bose, Rabindranath Tagore, Asit Kumar Haldar, Sukhvir Sanghal.It emerged as a powerful movement that sought to revive traditional Indian artistic practices and forge a unique national identity.

In the aftermath of India's independence, many new genres of art developed by important artists like Jamini Roy, M. F. Husain, Francis Newton Souza, and Vasudeo S. Gaitonde. With the progress of the economy the forms and styles of art also underwent many changes. In the 1990s, Indian economy was liberalised and integrated to the world economy leading to the free flow of cultural information within and without. Artists include Subodh Gupta, Atul Dodiya, Devajyoti Ray, Bose Krishnamachari and Jitish Kallat whose works went for auction in international markets. Bharti Dayal has chosen to handle the traditional Mithila painting in most contemporary way and created her own style through the exercises of her own imagination, they appear fresh and unusual.

== History of Indian painting ==
=== Prehistoric rock art ===
The pre-historic paintings were generally executed on rocks and these rock engravings were called petroglyphs. These paintings generally depict animals like bison, bear, tigers etc. The oldest Indian paintings are rock art in caves which are around 30,000 years old, such as the Bhimbetka cave paintings. The earliest discovery of prehistoric rock paintings in India was made in 1867–1868 by the archaeologist Archibald Carlleyle in Uttar Pradesh.

=== Literature ===
There are many important dedicated Indian treatises on painting, traditionally called chitra. Some of these are chapters within a larger encyclopedia-like texts. They date between the 4th and 13th-century CE. These include:

- Chitrasutras, chapters 35–43 within the Hindu text Vishnudharmottara Purana (the standard, and oft referred to text in the Indian tradition)
- Chitralaksana of Nagnajit (a classic on classical painting, 5th-century CE or earlier making it the oldest known text on Indian painting; but the Sanskrit version has been lost, only version available is in Tibet and it states that it is a translation of a Sanskrit text)
- Samarangana Sutradhara (mostly architecture treatise, contains a large section on paintings)
- Aparajitaprccha (mostly architecture treatise, contains a large section on paintings)
- Manasollasa (an encyclopedia, contains chapters on paintings)
- Abhilashitartha chinatamani
- Sivatatva ratnakara
- Chitra Kaladruma
- Silpa ratna
- Narada silpa
- Sarasvati silpa
- Prajapati silpa
- Kasyapa silpa

These and other texts on painting discuss the Indian ideas, theory and practice of painting, its relationship to other arts, methods of preparing the canvas or wall, recipes to make color pigments and other topics.

=== Murals ===
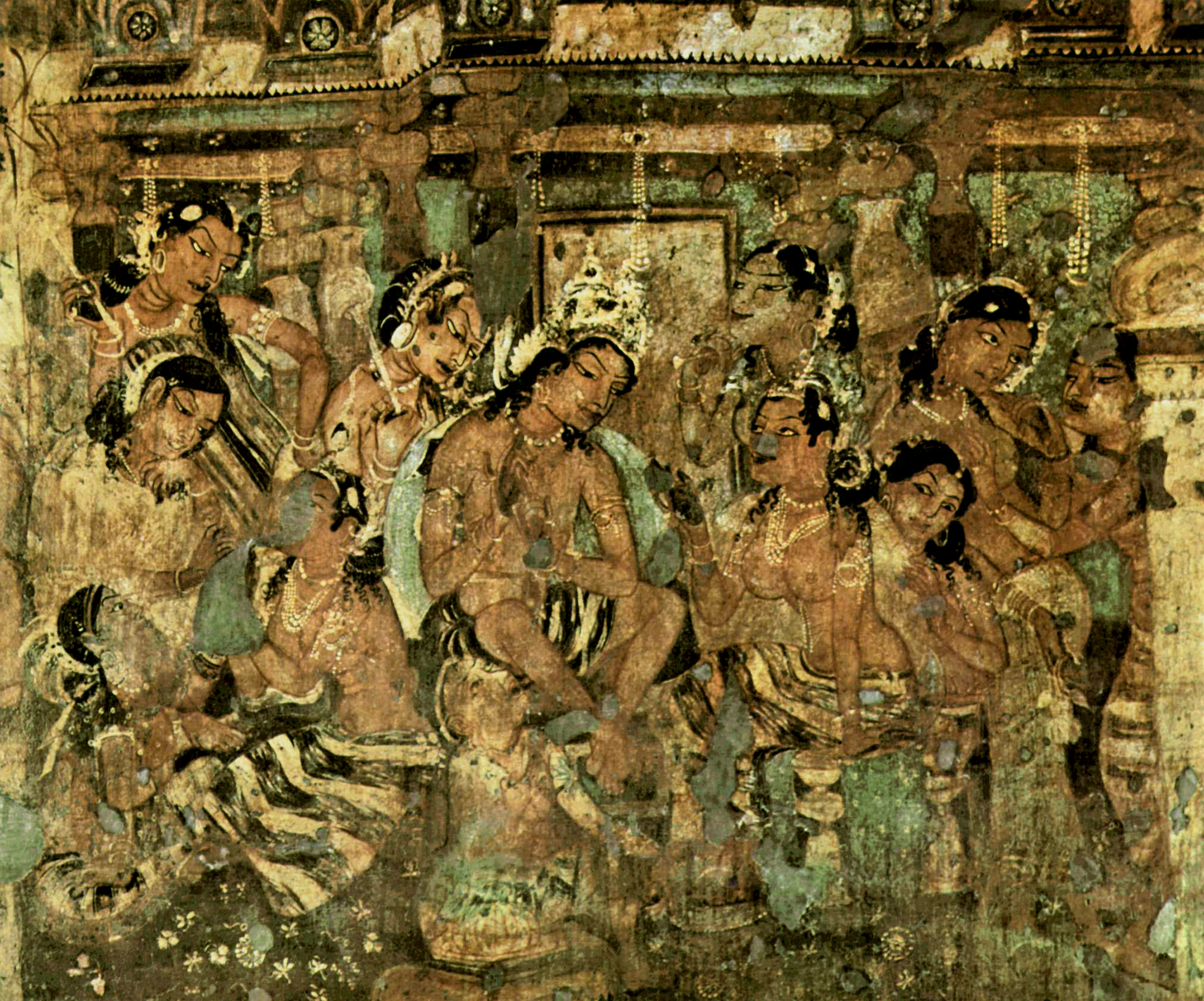
A mural painting depicting a scene from Mahajanaka Jataka, Cave 1, Ajanta

The history of Indian murals starts in ancient and early medieval times, from the 2nd century BC to 8th – 10th century AD. There are known more than 20 locations around India containing murals from this period, mainly natural caves and rock-cut chambers. These include the caves of Ajanta, Bagh, Sittanavasal, Armamalai Cave (Tamil Nadu), Kailasanatha temple in Ellora Caves, Ramgarh and Sitabinji.

Murals from this period depict mainly religious themes of Buddhist, Jain and Hindu religions. There are though also locations where paintings were secular. This includes the oldest known painted cave and theatre in Chhattisgarh – the Jogimara and Sitabenga Caves – dated to between the 3rd to 1st century BCE.

=== Pre-11th-century miniature paintings ===
Early survivals of portable Indian paintings are all miniatures from texts (the great majority) or painted objects such as boxes. Despite considerable evidence that larger paintings on cloth (known as pata) existed, and indeed surviving texts discussing how to make them, not a single medieval Indian painting on cloth is known to survive, unless some Buddhist ones have been taken as Tibetan, or from Central Asia. Some of the images recovered there by Sir Aurel Stein are Indian paintings, most being Buddhist and some with Hindu deities such as Ganesha and Shiva. According to Blurton, such early paintings did not survive largely because of the deleterious climate of India, as well as due to the "added problem of Muslim iconoclasm" in the centuries that followed.

The pattern of large scale wall painting which had dominated the scene, witnessed the advent of miniature paintings during the 11th and 12th centuries. This new style figured first in the form of illustrations etched on palm-leaf manuscripts.

==== Eastern India ====
In eastern India, the principal centres of artistic and intellectual activities of the Buddhist religion were Nalanda, Odantapuri, Vikramshila and Somarpura situated in the Pala kingdom (Bengal and Bihar). Miniature painting from this region survives from the 10th century. These miniatures, depicting Buddhist divinities and scenes from the life of Buddha were painted on the leaves (about 2.25 by 3 inches) of the palm-leaf manuscripts as well as their wooden covers. Most common Buddhist illustrated manuscripts include the texts Astasahasrika Prajnaparamita, Pancharaksa, Karandavyuha and Kalachakra Tantra. The earliest extant miniatures are found in a manuscript of the Astasahasrika Prajnaparamita dated in the sixth regnal year of Mahipala (c. 993), presently the possession of The Asiatic Society, Kolkata. This style disappeared from India in the late 12th century.

The influence of eastern Indian paintings can be seen in various Buddhist temples in Bagan, Myanmar particularly Abeyadana temple which was named after Queen consort of Myanmar, Abeyadana who herself had Indian roots and Gubyaukgyi Temple. The influences of eastern Indian paintings can also be clearly observed in Tibetan Thangka paintings.

==== Western India ====
Surviving illustrated manuscripts from Western India, mainly Gujarat, begin around the 11th century, but are mostly from the 13th onwards. Initially surviving examples are all Jain. By the 15th century they were becoming increasingly lavish, with much use of gold.

The manuscript text most frequently illustrated is the Kalpa Sūtra, containing the biographies of the Tirthankaras, notably Parshvanatha and Mahavira. The illustrations are square-ish panels set in the text, with "wiry drawing" and "brilliant, even jewel-like colour". The figures are always seen in three-quarters view, with distinctive "long pointed noses and protruding eyes". There is a convention whereby the more distant side of the face protrudes, so that both eyes are seen.

=== Shadanga of Indian painting ===
Ancient texts defined six important aspects of painting. These 'Six Limbs' have been translated as follows:

- Rupabheda: The knowledge of appearances
- Pramanam: Correct perception, proportion, measure and structure
- Bhava: Action of feelings on forms
- Lavanya Yojanam: Infusion of grace, artistic representation
- Sadrisyam: Similitude
- Varnikabhanga: Artistic manner of using the brush and colours (Tagore)

The subsequent development of painting by the Buddhists indicates that these ' Six Limbs ' were put into practice by Indian artists, and are the basic principles on which their art was founded.

=== Early Modern period (1526―1857 CE) ===
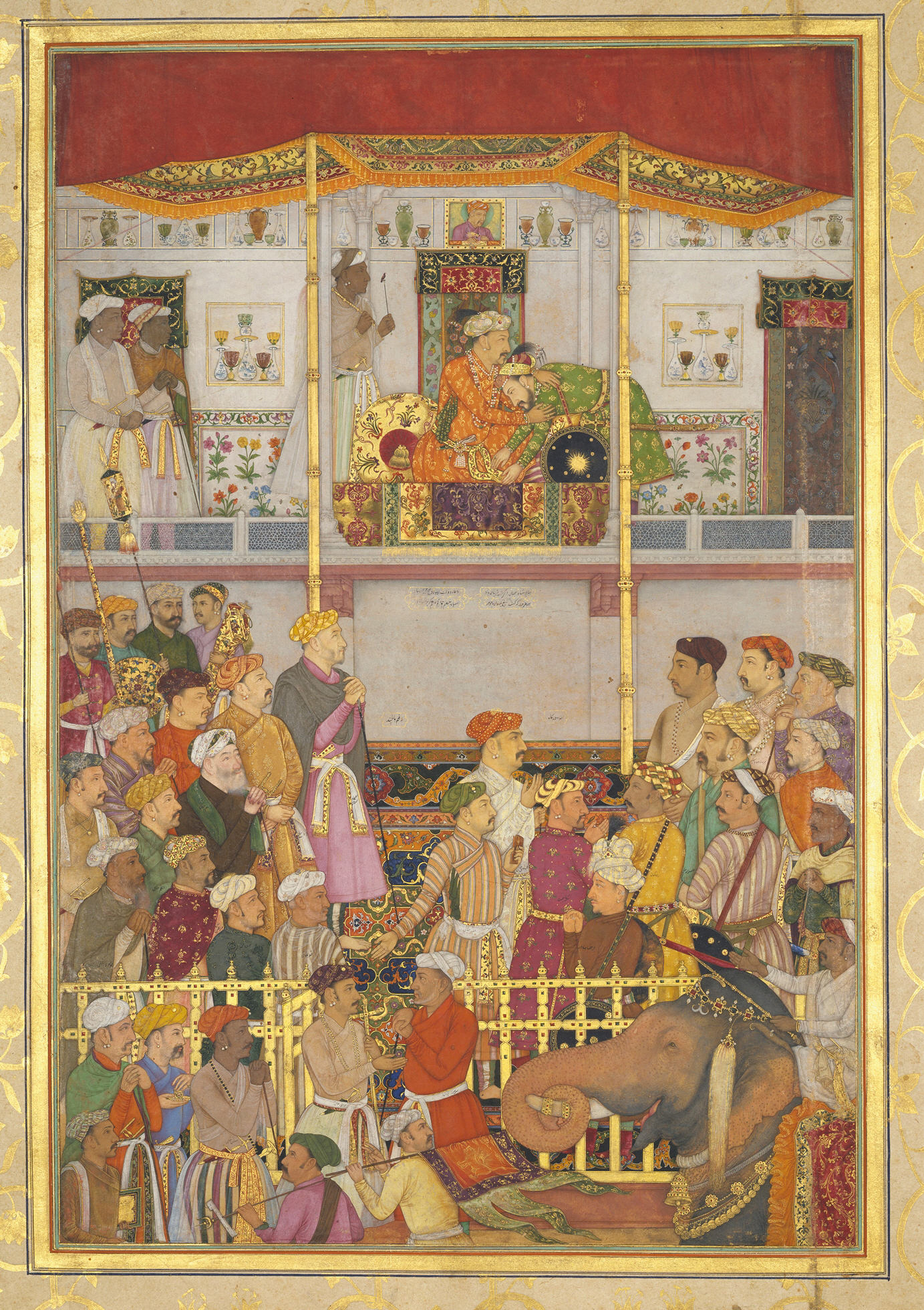
Jahangir Receives Prince Khurram at Ajmer on His Return from the Mewar Campaign, Balchand, c. 1635

==== Mughal painting ====
Mughal painting is a style of Indian painting, generally confined to illustrations on the book and done in miniatures, and which emerged, developed and took shape during the period of the Mughal Empire between the 16th and 19th centuries. The Mughal style was heavily influenced by Persian miniatures, and in turn influenced several Indian styles, including the Rajput, Pahari and Deccan styles of painting.

Mughal paintings were a unique blend of Indian, Persian and Islamic styles. Because the Mughal kings wanted visual records of their deeds as hunters and conquerors, their artists accompanied them on military expeditions or missions of state, or recorded their prowess as animal slayers, or depicted them in the great dynastic ceremonies of marriages.

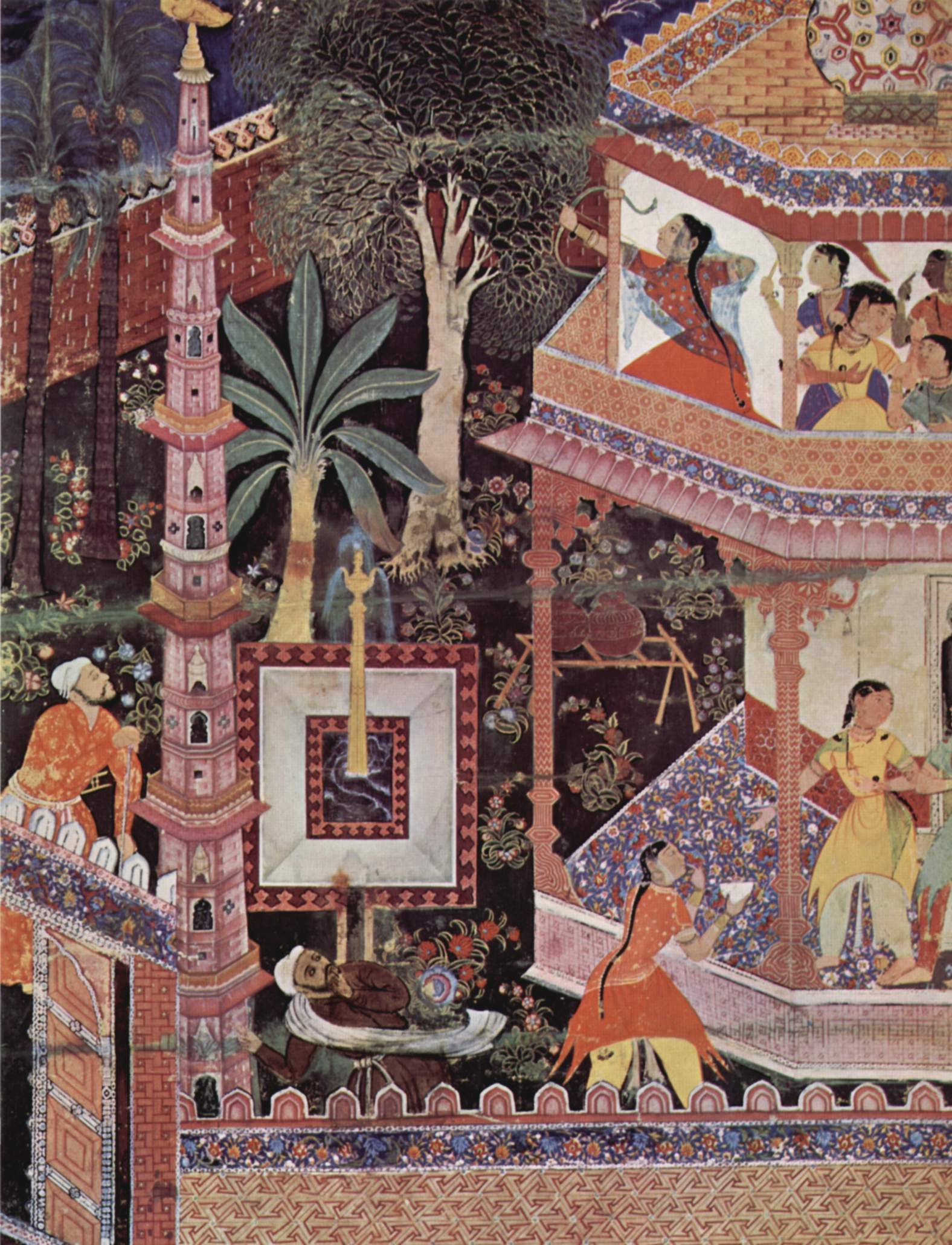
A folio from the Hamzanama

Akbar's reign (1556–1605) ushered in a new era in Indian miniature painting. After he had consolidated his political power, he built a new capital at Fatehpur Sikri where he collected artists from India and Persia. He was the first monarch who established in India an atelier under the supervision of two Persian master artists, Mir Sayyed Ali and Abdus Samad. Earlier, both of them had served under the patronage of Humayun in Kabul and accompanied him to India when he regained his throne in 1555. More than a hundred painters were employed, most of whom were from Gujarat, Gwalior and Kashmir, who gave a birth to a new school of painting, popularly known as the Mughal School of miniature Paintings.

Tuti-Nama was an early Mughal work from the mid 16th Century, and the similarities particularly in the female figures to the indigenous western India school is clearly visible. While some consider this to be a transition phase where the stylistic features of indigenous & Persian schools combined, other considered this to be a work of artists who were trained in western India school and who worked in Akbar's atelier to produce art for the Mughal palette, maybe under supervision of Persian masters.

Another early production by that school of miniature painting was the Akbar Hamzanama manuscript, which according to the court historian Badayuni was started in 1567 and completed in 1582. The Hamzanama, an epic Persian account of Amir Hamza, an uncle of the Prophet, were illustrated by Mir Sayyid Ali. The paintings of the Akbar Hamzanama are of large size, 20 x 27", and were painted on cloth. They are in the Persian safavi style. Brilliant red, blue and green colours predominate; the pink, eroded rocks and the vegetation, planes and blossoming plum and peach trees are reminiscent of Persia. The Hamza Nama is very different in style to the Tuti Nama. This difference was either due to a different set of artists who were trained in the Persian style or due to a conscious change in style through experimentation, either ways, mughal painting quickly evolved into more fluid and naturalistic style different from the stiffness in figures seen in earlier paintings. Nevertheless, links to the western India schools were still there on close inspection, particularly in the representation of the female figure.

After him, Jahangir encouraged artists to paint portraits and durbar scenes. His most talented portrait painters were Ustad Mansur, Abul Hasan and Bishandas.

Shah Jahan (1627–1658) continued the patronage of painting. Some of the famous artists of the period were Mohammad Faqirullah Khan, Mir Hashim, Muhammad Nadir, Bichitr, Chitarman, Anupchhatar, Manohar and Honhar.

Aurangzeb had no taste for fine arts, probably due to his Islamic conservatism. Due to lack of patronage artists migrated to the Deccan and the Hindu courts of Rajputana, greatly influencing the styles in these centres.

==== Deccan painting ====
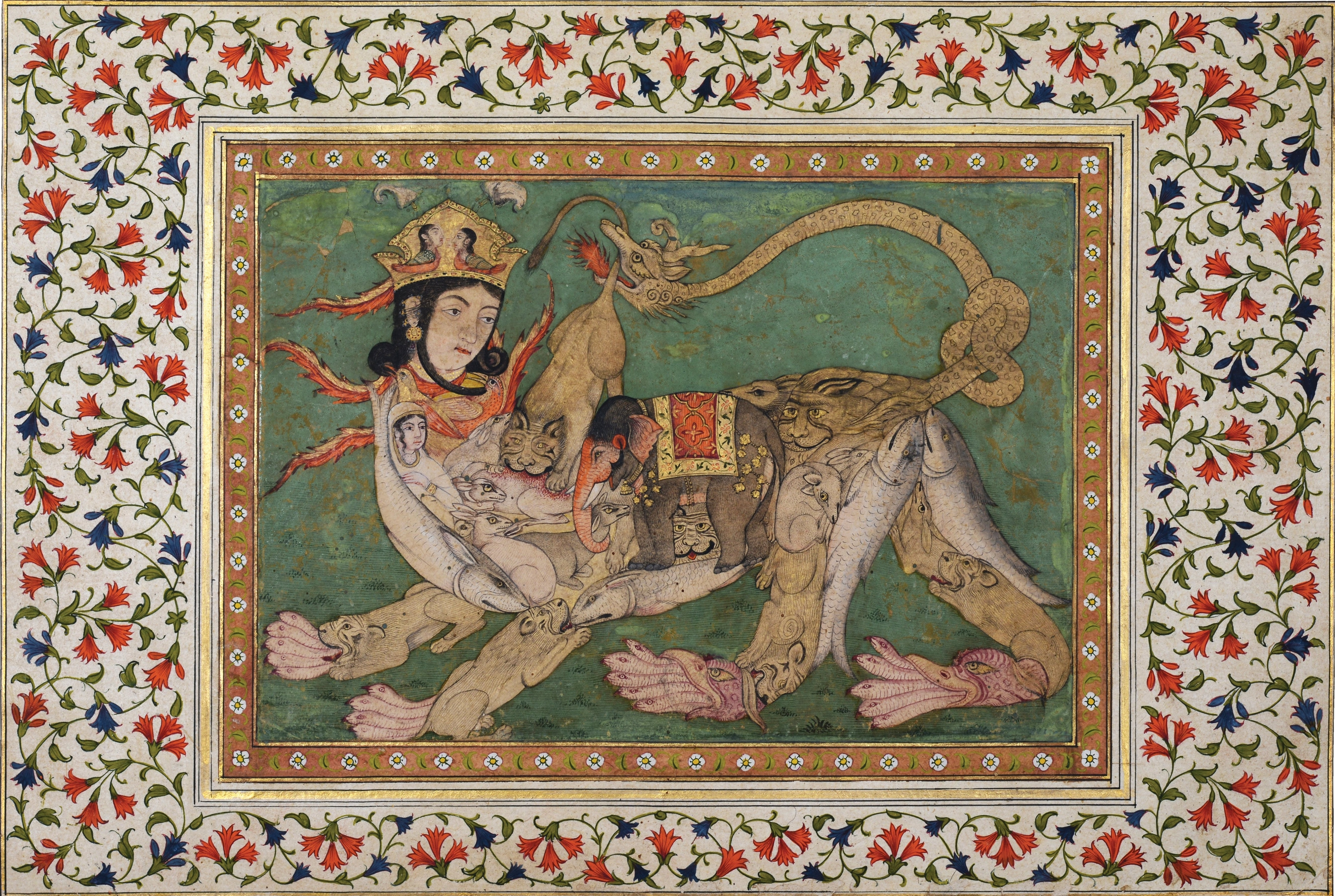
Composite Buraq, National Museum, New Delhi, Hyderabad, 1770–75

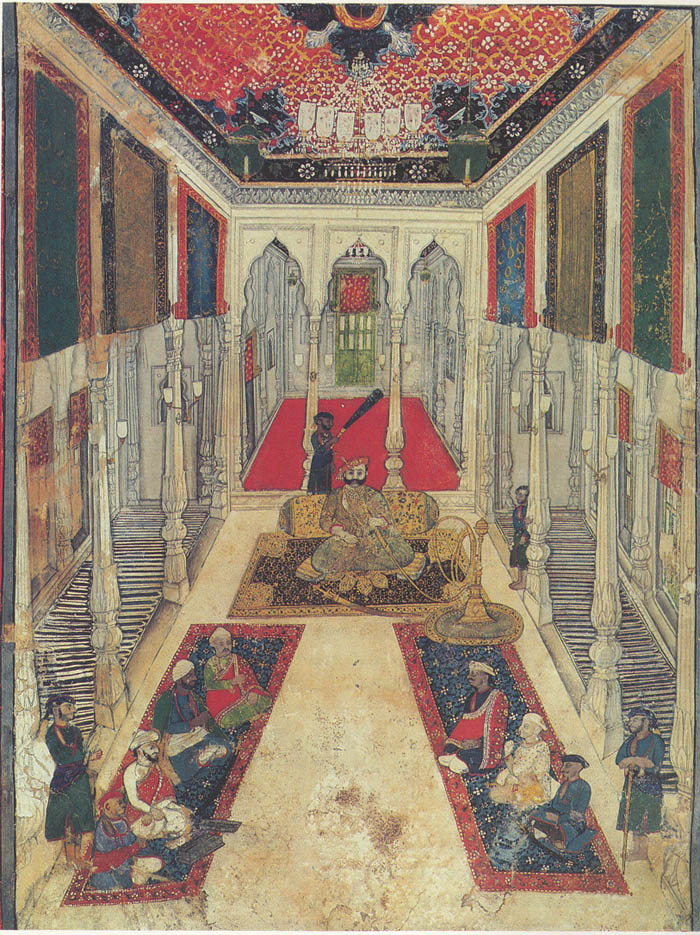
A Maratha Darbar c.1820

Deccan painting was produced in the Deccan region of Central India, in the various Muslim capitals of the Deccan sultanates that emerged from the break-up of the Bahmani Sultanate by 1520. These were Bijapur, Golkonda, Ahmadnagar, Bidar, and Berar. The main period was between the late 16th century and the mid-17th, with something of a revival in the mid-18th century, by then centred on Hyderabad.

Compared to the early Mughal painting evolving at the same time to the north, Deccan painting exceeds in "the brilliance of their colour, the sophistication and artistry of their composition, and a general air of decadent luxury". Other differences include painting faces, not very expertly modelled, in three-quarter view, rather than mostly in profile in the Mughal style, and "tall women with small heads" wearing saris. There are many royal portraits, although they lack the precise likenesses of their Mughal equivalents. Buildings are depicted as "totally flat screen-like panels".

Ragamala paintings, sets illustrating (by evoking their moods) the various raga musical forms, appear to have been an innovation of the Deccan. Beside the usual portraits and illustrations to literary works, there are sometimes illustrated chronicles, such as the Tuzuk-i-Asafiya. A Deccan speciality (also sometimes found in other media, such as ivory) is the "composite animal", a large animal made up of many smaller images of other animals.

==== Rajput painting ====
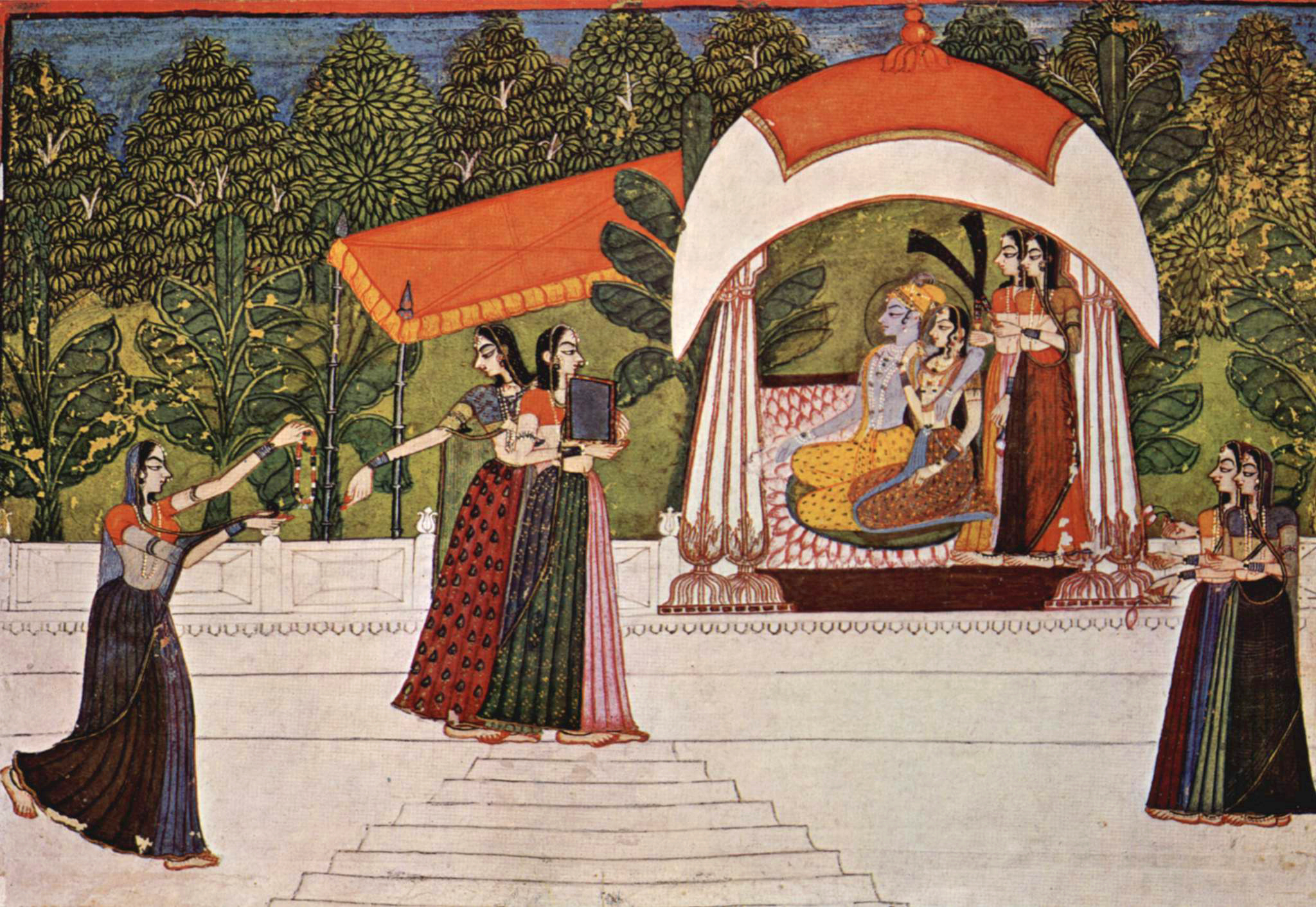
An 18th-century Rajput painting by Nihâl Chand

The early Mewar and Malwa schools, sometimes also collectively known as Western India school, developed around this period, and are stylistically similar and linked to the style of depiction in 14th–15th century texts from Gujarat. The similar large eyes, stiff figures, protruding hips and breasts are a linking feature. The Kulhadar group of paintings is considered one of the finest works executed belonging to the western India school. Executed in early 16th century, this group paintings were characterized by the men wearing a conical cap (Kulha) on which turbans were worn. The Kulhadar group of paintings consisted of Chaurapanchasika – "Fifty Verses of the Thief" by Bilhan, the Gita Govinda, the Bhagavata Purana and Ragamala.

Driven by the Islamic conquests, the mid- to late 16th century saw central Asian influence starting to creep into Indian artistic representation. The use of gold foil and ultramarine blue derived from imported lapiz lazuli were two such Persian influences which were adopted into Indian painting. Manuscripts of Laur Chanda at the National Museum are an example of such influence.

Several different styles of Rajput painting developed from the late 16th century onwards in the Hindu royal courts of Rajputana. Each Rajput kingdom evolved a distinct style, but with certain common features. Rajput paintings depict a number of themes, events of epics like the Ramayana and the Mahabharata, Krishna's life, beautiful landscapes, and humans. Many miniatures were individual album pieces, but there are also illustrated books, and there was at the same time some mural painting on the walls of palaces, forts, and havelis. This especially so in the Shekhawati region, where Marwari businessmen, mainly active in the large cities, competed to have brightly painted exteriors of the houses they maintained in their home region.

Rajput painting consists of four principal groupings:

- The Mewar school that contains the Chavand, Nathdwara, Devgarh, Udaipur and Sawar styles of painting
- The Marwar school comprising the Kishangarh, Bikaner style of painting from Bikaner, Jodhpur, Nagaur, Pali and Ghanerao styles
- The Hadoti school with the Kota, Bundi and Jhalawar styles and
- The Dhundar school of Amber, Jaipur, Shekhawati painting and Uniara styles of painting

Pahari painting is the northernmost extension of the Rajput style, but usually treated separately.

==== Pahari painting ====
The Pahari style, also referred to as the Punjab Hills style, developed and flourished during 17th to 19th centuries stretching from Jammu to Almora and Garhwal, in the sub-Himalayan India, through Himachal Pradesh. The Pahari paintings can be grouped into two groups- Jammu or Dogra school; and Basholi and Kangra school. Each created stark variations within the genre, ranging from bold intense Basohli painting, originating from Basohli in Jammu and Kashmir, to the delicate and lyrical Kangra paintings, which became synonymous to the style before other schools of paintings developed.

==== Malwa and Jaunpur ====
A new trend in manuscript illustration was set by a manuscript of the Nimatnama painted at Mandu, during the reign of Nasir Shah (1500–1510). This represent a synthesis of the indigenous and the patronized Persian style, though it was the latter which dominated the Mandu manuscripts. There was another style of painting known as Lodi Khuladar that flourished in the Sultanate's dominion of North India extending from Delhi to Jaunpur.

==== Mysore painting ====
Mysore painting is an important form of classical South Indian painting that originated in the town of Mysore in Karnataka. These paintings are known for their elegance, muted colours and attention to detail. The themes for most of these paintings are Hindu Gods and Goddesses and scenes from Hindu mythology. In modern times, these paintings have become a much sought-after souvenir during festive occasions in South India.

The process of making a Mysore painting involves many stages. The first stage involves the making of the preliminary sketch of the image on the base. The base consists of cartridge paper pasted on a wooden base. A paste made of zinc oxide and arabic gum is made called "gesso paste". With the help of a thin brush all the jewellery and parts of throne or the arch which have some relief are painted over to give a slightly raised effect of carving. This is allowed to dry. On this thin gold foil is pasted. The rest of the drawing is then painted using watercolours. Only muted colours are used.

==== Tanjore painting ====
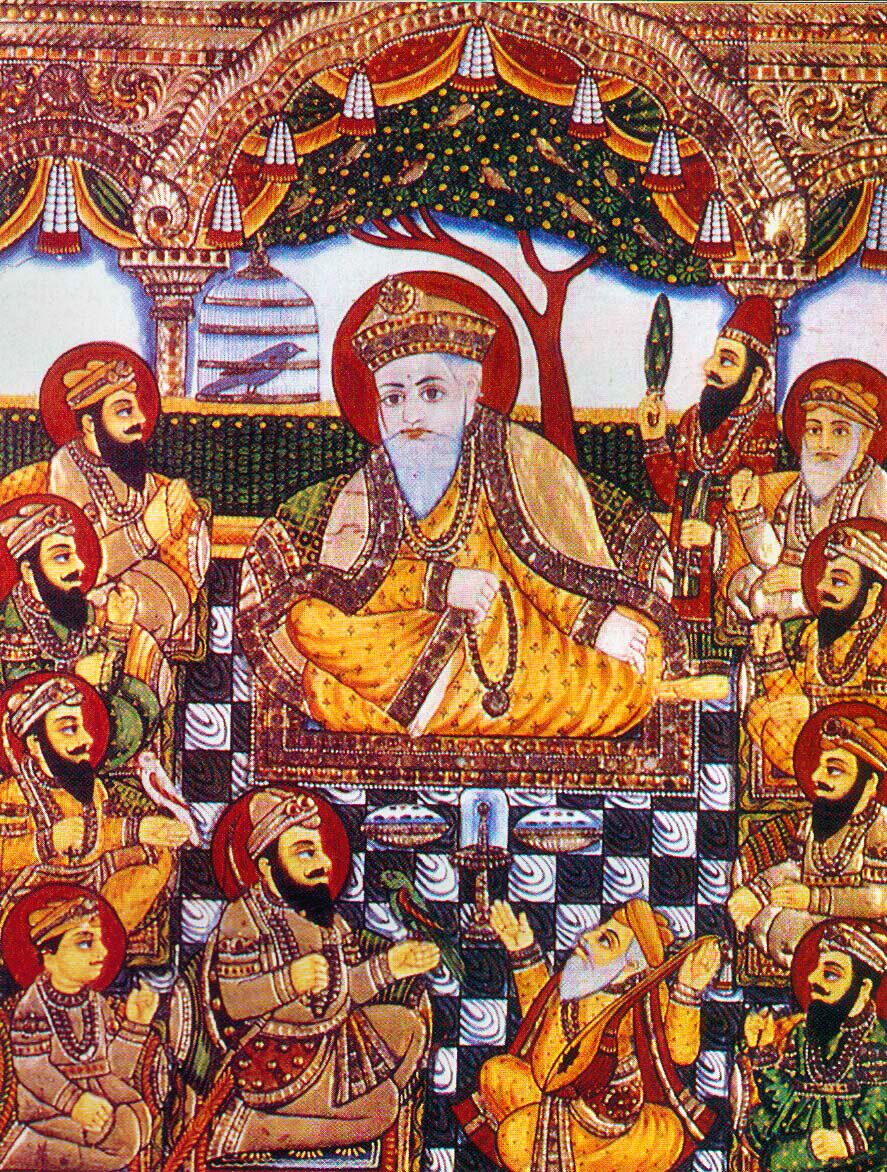
Tanjore style painting depicting the ten Sikh Gurus with Bhai Bala and Bhai Mardana

Tanjore painting is an important form of classical South Indian painting native to the town of Tanjore in Tamil Nadu. The art form dates back to the early 9th century, a period dominated by the Chola rulers, who encouraged art and literature. These paintings are known for their elegance, rich colours, and attention to detail. The themes for most of these paintings are Hindu Gods and Goddesses and scenes from Hindu mythology. In modern times, these paintings have become a much sought-after souvenir during festive occasions in South India.

The process of making a Tanjore painting involves many stages. The first stage involves the making of the preliminary sketch of the image on the base. The base consists of a cloth pasted over a wooden base. Then chalk powder or zinc oxide is mixed with water-soluble adhesive and apply it on the base. To make the base smoother, a mild abrasive is sometimes used. After the drawing is made, decoration of the jewelry and the apparels in the image is done with semi-precious stones. Laces or threads are also used to decorate the jewelry. On top of this, the gold foils are pasted. Finally, dyes are used to add colours to the figures in the paintings.

==== Pattachitra ====
Pattachitra refers to the Classical painting of Odisha and West Bengal, in the eastern region of India.'Patta' in Sanskrit means 'Vastra' or 'clothing' and 'chitra' means paintings.

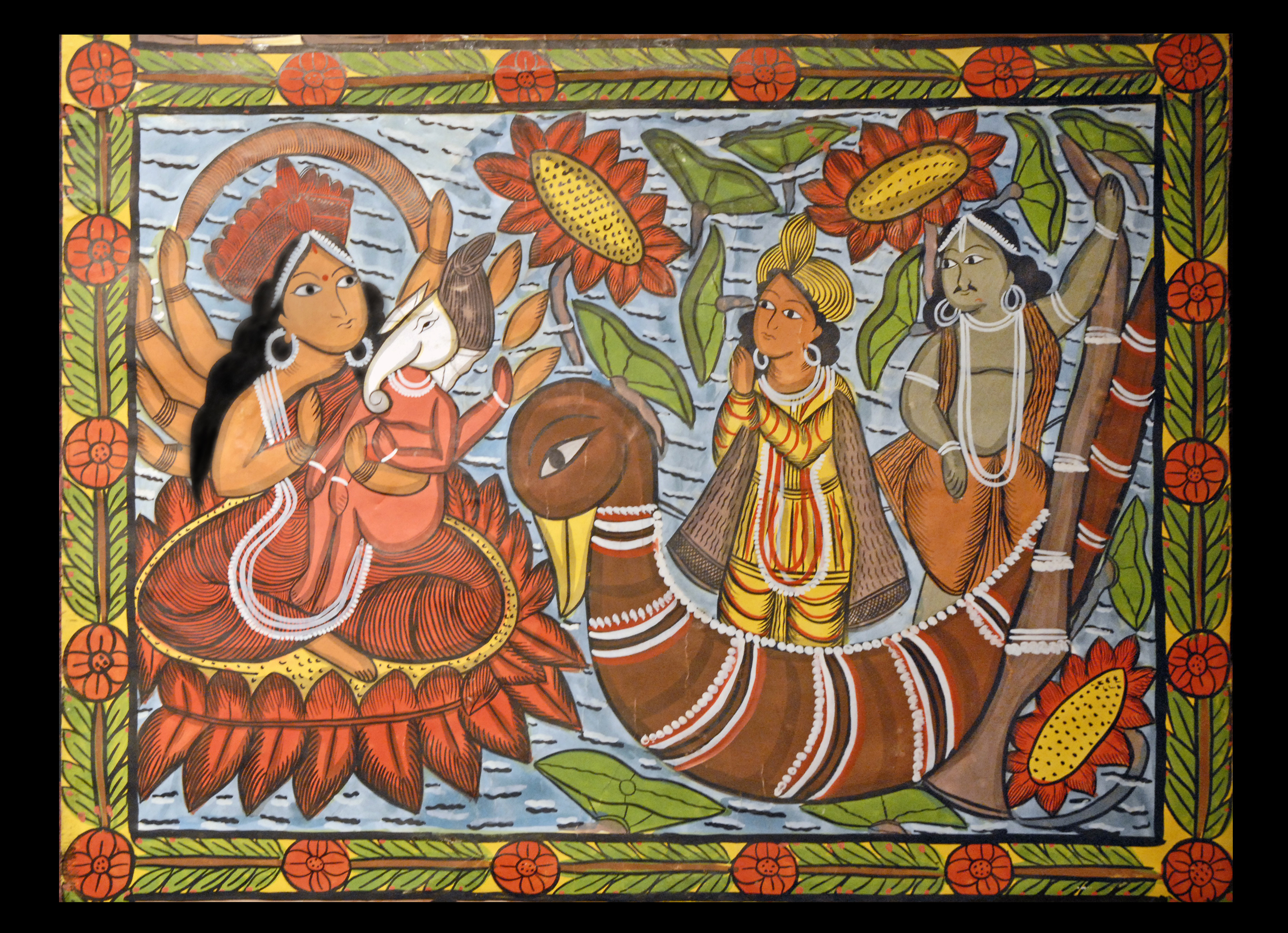
Patachitra of Naya village

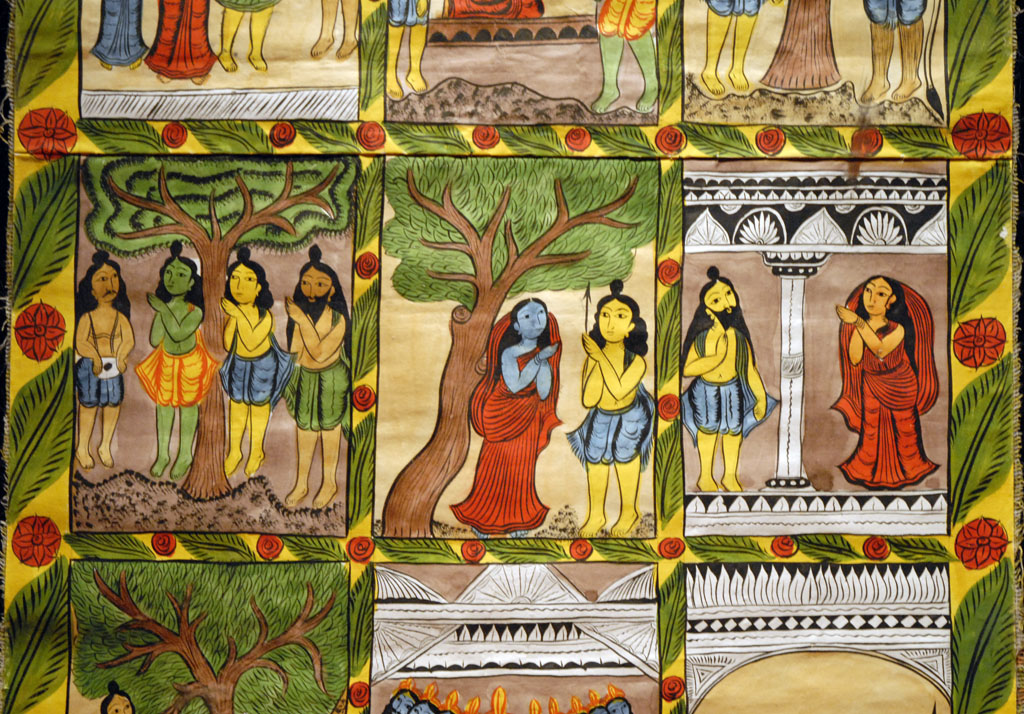
Patachitra of Naya village

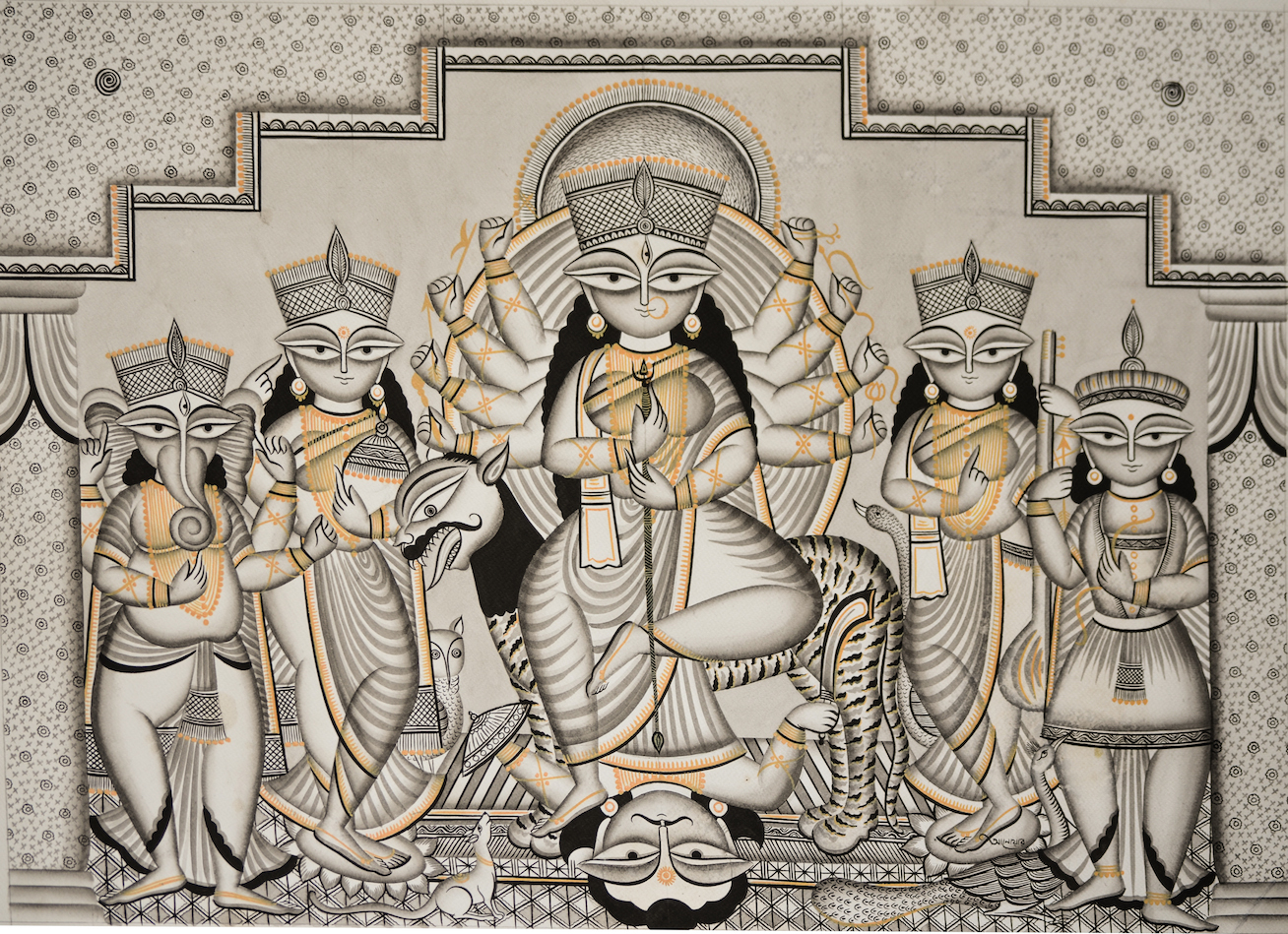
Goddess Durga and her family in Medinipur Patachitra

The Bengal Patachitra

The Bengal Patachitra refers to the painting of West Bengal. It is a traditional and mythological heritage of West Bengal. The Bengal Patachitra is divided into some different aspects like Durga Pat, Chalchitra, Tribal Patachitra, Medinipur Patachitra, and Kalighat Patachitra. The subject matter of Bengal Patachitra is mostly mythological, religious stories, folk lore and social. The Kalighat Patachitra, the last tradition of Bengal Patachitra is developed by Jamini Roy. The artist of the Bengal Patachitra is called Patua.

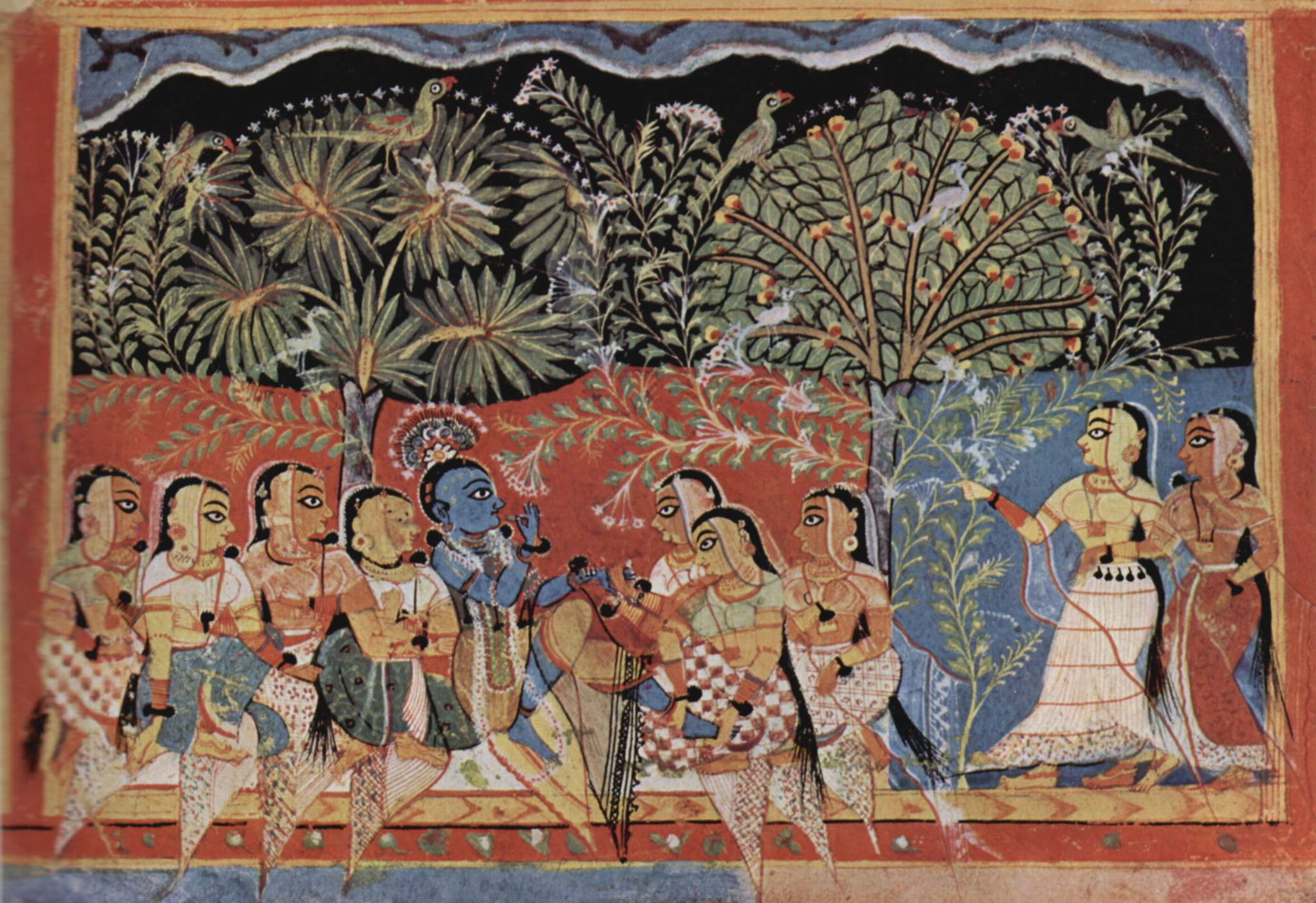
Gita Govinda depicted in Pattachitra

The tradition of Orisha Pattachitra is closely linked with the worship of Lord Jagannath. Apart from the fragmentary evidence of paintings on the caves of Khandagiri and Udayagiri and Sitabhinji murals of the Sixth century A.D., the earliest indigenous paintings from Odisha are the Pattachitra done by the Chitrakars (the painters are called Chitrakars). The theme of Oriya painting centres round the Vaishnava sect. Since beginning of Pattachitra culture Lord Jagannath who was an incarnation of Lord Krishna was the major source of inspiration. The subject matter of Patta Chitra is mostly mythological, religious stories and folk lore. Themes are chiefly on Lord Jagannath and Radha-Krishna, different "Vesas" of Jagannath, Balabhadra and Subhadra, temple activities, the ten incarnations of Vishnu basing on the 'Gita Govinda' of Jayadev, Kama Kujara Naba Gunjara, Ramayana, Mahabharata. The individual paintings of gods and goddesses are also being painted. The painters use vegetable and mineral colours without going for factory made poster colours. They prepare their own colours. White colour is made from the conch-shells by powdering, boiling and filtering in a very hazardous process. It requires a lot of patience. But this process gives brilliance and permanence to the hue. 'Hingula', a mineral colour, is used for red. 'Haritala', king of stone ingredients for yellow, 'Ramaraja' a sort of indigo for blue are being used. Pure lamp-black or black prepared from the burning of cocoanut shells are used. The brushes that are used by these 'Chitrakaras' are also indigenous and are made of hair of domestic animals. A bunch of hair tied to the end of a bamboo stick make the brush. It is really a matter of wonder as to how these painters bring out lines of such precision and finish with the help of these crude brushes. That old tradition of Oriya painting still survives to-day in the skilled hands of Chitrakaras (traditional painters) in Puri, Raghurajpur, Paralakhemundi, Chikiti and Sonepur.

==== Assam painting ====
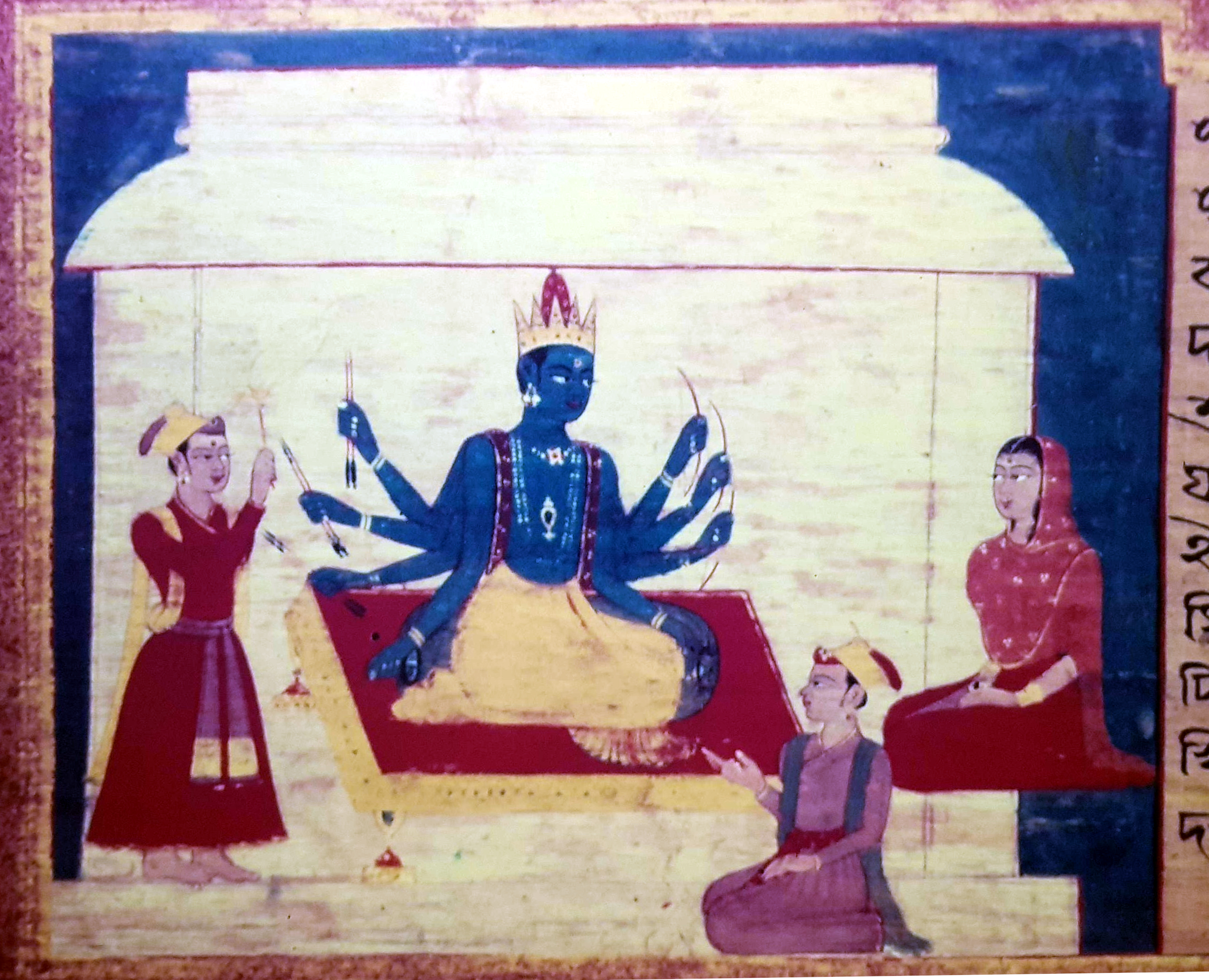
Illustrated Assamese manuscript

Painting of Assam led to its growth in response to Neo-Vaisnavism movement starting in the 15th century and even received royal patronage under various erstwhile royal classes. Manuscript painting of Assam continued to flourish till the decay of the Ahom kingdom.

==== Other regional styles ====
Madhubani painting is a style of painting, practiced in the Mithila region of Bihar state. Themes revolve around Hindu Gods and mythology, along with scenes from the royal court and social events like weddings. Generally no space is left empty; the gaps are filled by paintings of flowers, animals, birds, and even geometric designs.In this paintings, artists use leaves, herbs, and flowers to make the colour which is used to draw the paintings.

=== British Colonial period ===
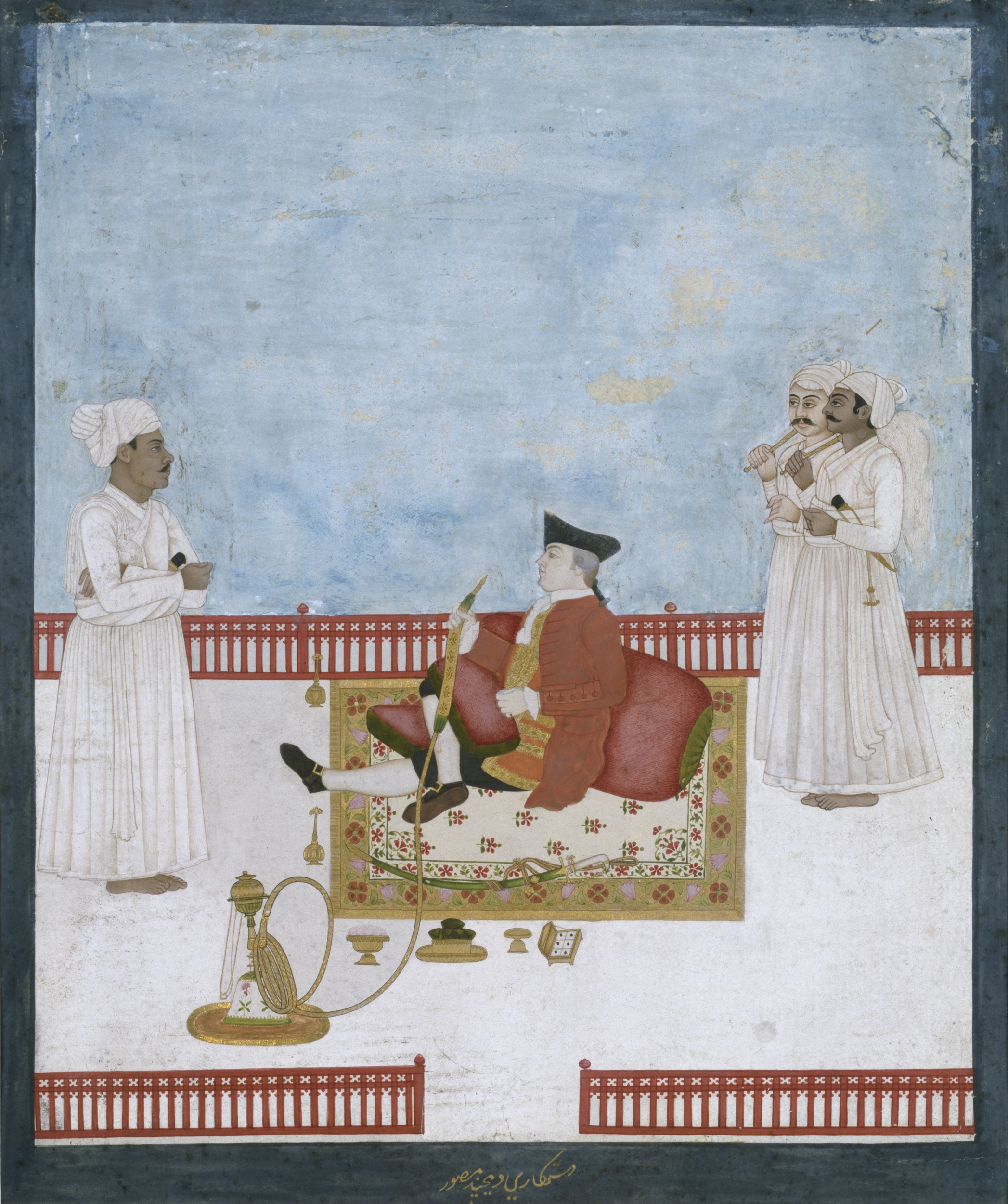
Company painting by Dip Chand depicting an official of the East India Company

==== Company style ====
As company rule in India began in the 18th century, a great number of Europeans migrated to India. The Company style is a term for a hybrid Indo-European style of paintings made in India by Indian and European artists, many of whom worked for European patrons in the British East India Company or other foreign Companies in the 18th and 19th centuries. The style blended traditional elements from Rajput and Mughal painting with a more Western treatment of perspective, volume and recession.

==== Early Modern Indian painting ====
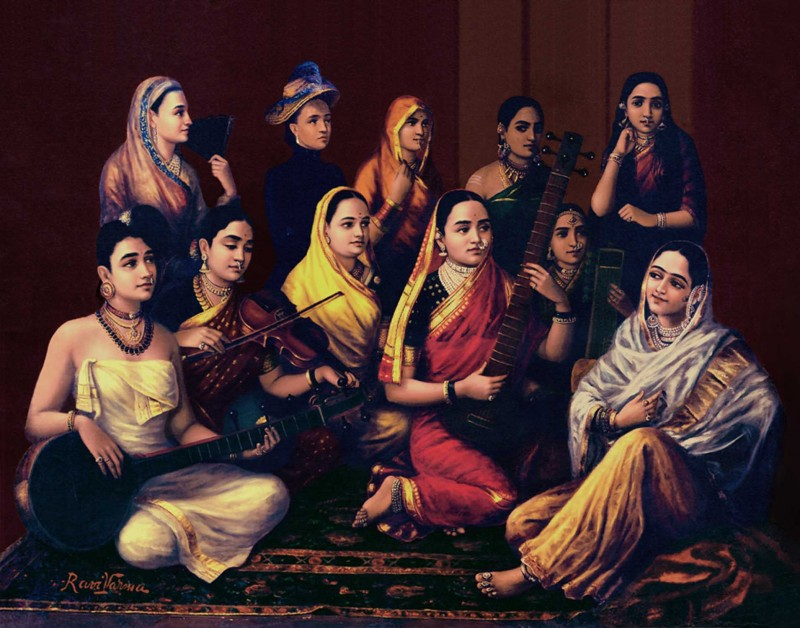
Galaxy of Musicians by Raja Ravi Varma, oil on canvas

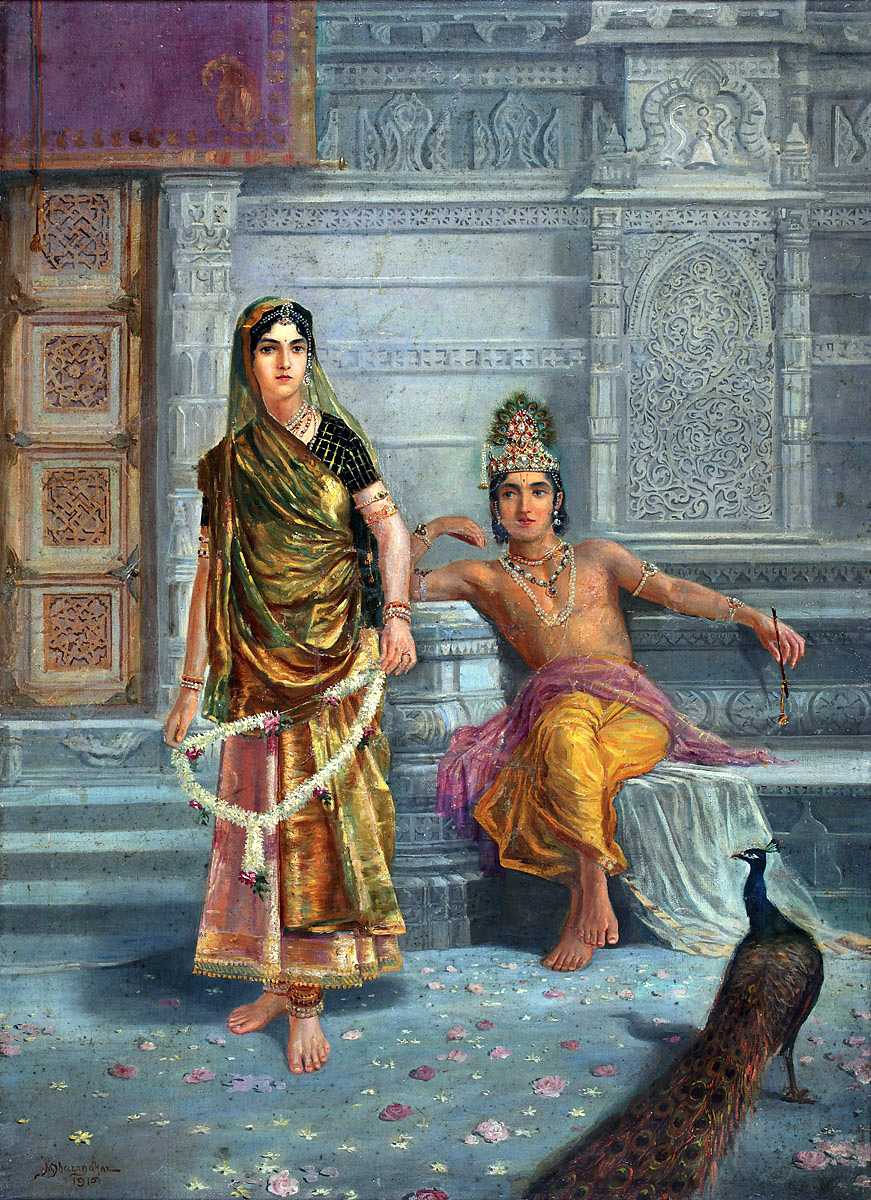
Radha and Krishna by M. V. Dhurandhar, oil on canvas

At the start of the 18th century, oil and easel painting began in India, which saw many European artists, such as Zoffany, Kettle, Hodges, Thomas and William Daniell, Joshua Reynolds, Emily Eden and George Chinnery coming out to India in search of fame and fortune. The courts of the princely states of India were an important draw for European artists due to their patronage of the visual and performing arts. For Indian artists, this Western influence, largely a result of colonialism, was viewed as "a means for self-improvement", and these Western academic artists who visited India provided the model. They did not, however, provide the training. According to R. Siva Kumar, "This task, which fell on the various art schools established in the 1850s, gave an institutional framework to the Westernization of Indian art".

The earliest formal art schools in India, namely the Government College of Fine Arts in Madras (1850), Government College of Art & Craft in Calcutta (1854) and Sir J. J. School of Art in Bombay (1857), were established.

Raja Ravi Varma was a pioneer of modern Indian painting. He drew on Western traditions and techniques including oil paint and easel painting, with his subjects being purely Indian, such as Hindu deities and episodes from the epics and Puranas. Some other prominent Indian painters born in the 19th century are Mahadev Vishwanath Dhurandhar (1867–1944), A X Trindade (1870–1935), M F Pithawalla (1872–1937), Sawlaram Lakshman Haldankar (1882–1968) , Hemen Majumdar (1894–1948) and Sukhvir Sanghal (1914-2006).

Sukhvir Sanghal was regarded as a pioneer of wash painting in India and was known for popularising the technique. His paintings explored themes including Indian culture, spirituality and philosophy, employing the wash technique as a principal medium of expression. His three-volume Evolution of Art and Artist examined the philosophical, psychological and technical aspects of art and included an interpretation of the nine rasas in terms of their psychological causes.

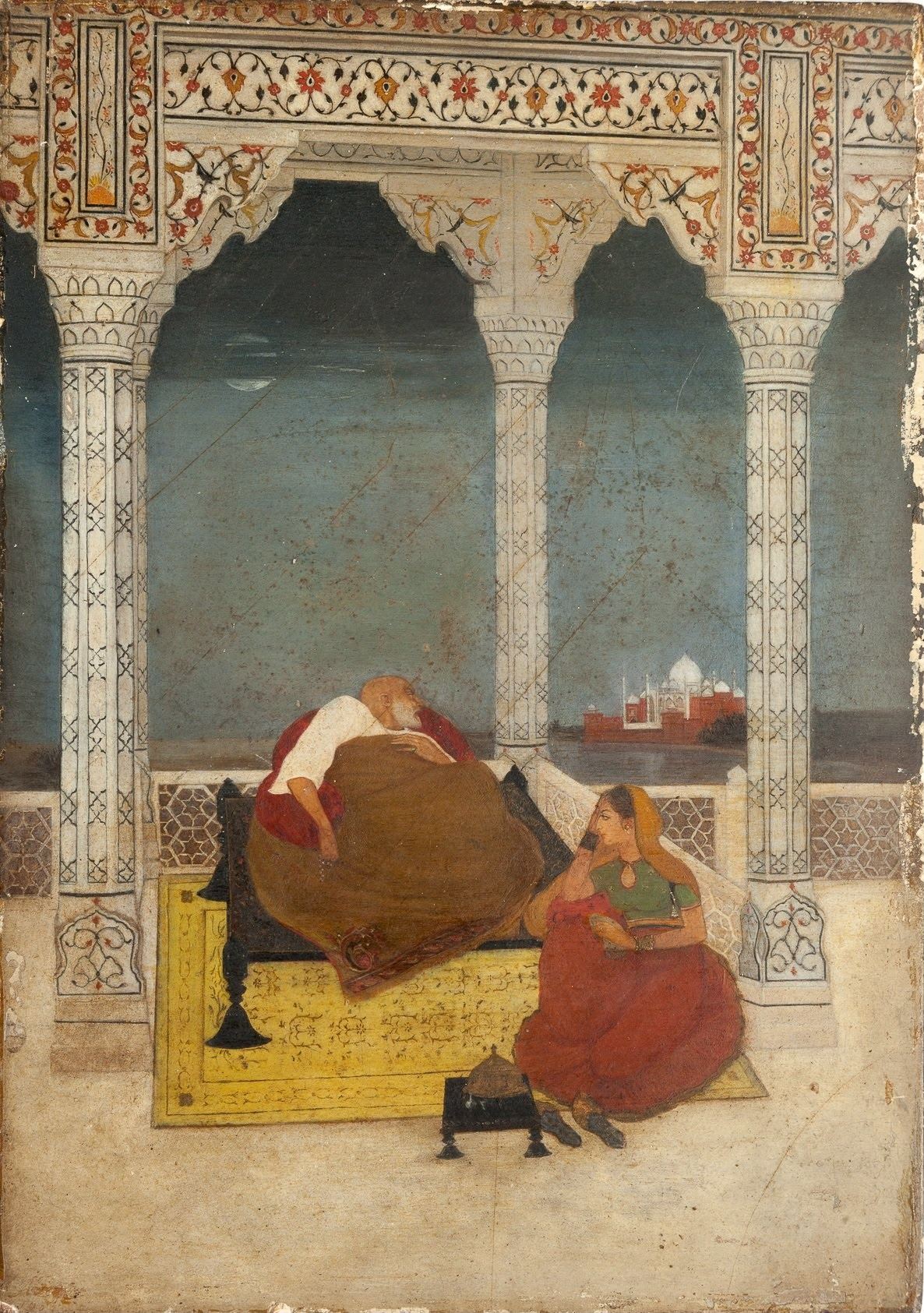
The Passing of Shah Jahan by Abanindranath Tagore

In the 19th century, according to R. Siva Kumar, "selective Westernization for self-improvement gave way to a nationalist cultural counter-stance around the turn of the century – universally, the first step toward a political resistance toward colonial rule". In practice, this materialized as an assimilation of "diverse Asian elements", expanding tradition more than reviving it. Leading artist of the time, Abanindranath Tagore (1871–1951), utilized both the Western-influenced realism and Asian elements which brought him "close to early modernism".

A reaction to the Western influence led to a revival in historic and more nationalistic Indian art, called as the Bengal school of art, which drew from the rich cultural heritage of India.

==== Bengal school ====
The Bengal School of Art was an influential style of art that flourished in India during the British Raj in the early 20th century. It was associated with Indian nationalism, but was also promoted and supported by many British arts administrators.

The Bengal school arose as an avant garde and nationalist movement reacting against the academic art styles previously promoted in India, both by Indian artists such as Ravi Varma and in British art schools. Following the widespread influence of Indian spiritual ideas in the West, the British art teacher Ernest Binfield Havel attempted to reform the teaching methods at the Calcutta School of Art by encouraging students to imitate Mughal miniatures. This caused immense controversy, leading to a strike by students and complaints from the local press, including from nationalists who considered it to be a retrogressive move. Havel was supported by the artist Abanindranath Tagore, a nephew of the poet and artist Rabindranath Tagore. Abanindranath painted a number of works influenced by the Ajanta painting style, a style that he and Havel believed to be expressive of India's distinct spiritual qualities, as opposed to the "materialism" of the West. His best-known painting, Bharat Mata (Mother India), depicted a young woman, portrayed with four arms in the manner of Hindu deities, holding objects symbolic of India's national aspirations.

Tagore later attempted to develop links with Far-Eastern artists as part of an aspiration to construct a pan-Asianist model of art. Those associated with this Indo-Far Eastern model included Nandalal Bose, Mukul Dey, Kalipada Ghoshal, Benode Behari Mukherjee, Vinayak Shivaram Masoji, B.C. Sanyal, Beohar Rammanohar Sinha, and subsequently their students A. Ramachandran, Tan Yuan Chameli, Ramananda Bandopadhyay and a few others.

Sukhvir Sanghal was associated with the Bengal School tradition and studied under Abanindranath Tagore and Asit Kumar Haldar. His artistic training within this tradition informed his later work and teaching. He subsequently served as principal of the Government School of Arts and Crafts in Lucknow, where he contributed to the continuation of the Bengal School's artistic and pedagogical traditions.

The Bengal school's influence on Indian art scene gradually started alleviating with the spread of modernist ideas post-independence.K. G. Subramanyan's role in this movement is significant.

==== Contextual Modernism ====
The term Contextual Modernism that Siva Kumar used in the catalogue of the exhibition has emerged as a postcolonial critical tool in the understanding of the art the Santiniketan artists had practised.

Several terms including Paul Gilroy's counter culture of modernity and Tani Barlow's Colonial modernity have been used to describe the kind of alternative modernity that emerged in non-European contexts. Professor Gall argues that 'Contextual Modernism' is a more suited term because "the colonial in colonial modernity does not accommodate the refusal of many in colonised situations to internalise inferiority. Santiniketan’s artist teachers' refusal of subordination incorporated a counter vision of modernity, which sought to correct the racial and cultural essentialism that drove and characterised imperial Western modernity and modernism. Those European modernities, projected through a triumphant British colonial power, provoked nationalist responses, equally problematic when they incorporated similar essentialisms".

According to R. Siva Kumar "The Santiniketan artists were one of the first who consciously challenged this idea of modernism by opting out of both internationalist modernism and historicist indigenousness and tried to create a context sensitive modernism." He had been studying the work of the Santiniketan masters and thinking about their approach to art since the early 80s. The practice of subsuming Nandalal Bose, Rabindranath Tagore, Ram Kinker Baij and Benode Behari Mukherjee under the Bengal School of Art was, according to Siva Kumar, misleading. This happened because early writers were guided by genealogies of apprenticeship rather than their styles, worldviews, and perspectives on art practice.

The literary critic Ranjit Hoskote while reviewing the works of contemporary artist Atul Dodiya writes, "The exposure to Santinketan, through a literary detour, opened Dodiya’s eyes to the historical circumstances of what the art historian R Siva Kumar has called a "contextual modernism" developed in eastern India in the 1930s and '40s during the turbulent decades of the global Depression, the Gandhian liberation struggle, the Tagorean cultural renaissance and World War II."

Contextual Modernism in the recent past has found its usage in other related fields of studies, specially in Architecture.

=== Post-Independence (1947–present) ===
During the colonial era, Western influences started to make an impact on Indian art. Some artists developed a style that used Western ideas of composition, perspective and realism to illustrate Indian themes. Others, like Jamini Roy, consciously drew inspiration from folk art. Bharti Dayal has chosen to handle the traditional Mithila Painting in most contemporary way and uses both realism as well abstractionism in her work with a lot of fantasy mixed in to both .Her work has an impeccable sense of balance, harmony and grace.

By the time of Independence in 1947, several schools of art in India provided access to modern techniques and ideas. Galleries were established to showcase these artists. Modern Indian art typically shows the influence of Western styles, but is often inspired by Indian themes and images. Major artists are beginning to gain international recognition, initially among the Indian diaspora, but also among non-Indian audiences.

The Progressive Artists' Group, established shortly after India became independent in 1947, was intended to establish new ways of expressing India in the post-colonial era. The founders were six eminent artists – K. H. Ara, S. K. Bakre, H. A. Gade, M.F. Husain, S.H. Raza and F. N. Souza, though the group was dissolved in 1956, it was profoundly influential in changing the idiom of Indian art. Almost all India's major artists in the 1950s were associated with the group. Some of those who are well-known today are Bal Chabda, Manishi Dey, V. S. Gaitonde, Krishen Khanna, Ram Kumar, Tyeb Mehta, Beohar Rammanohar Sinha and Akbar Padamsee. Other famous painters like Jahar Dasgupta, Prokash Karmakar, John Wilkins, and Bijon Choudhuri enriched the art culture of India. They have become the icon of modern Indian art. Art historians like Prof. Rai Anand Krishna have also referred to those works of modern artistes that reflect Indian ethos.

Also, the increase in the discourse about Indian art, in English as well as vernacular Indian languages, appropriated the way art was perceived in the art schools. Critical approach became rigorous, critics like Geeta Kapur, R. Siva Kumar, contributed to re-thinking contemporary art practice in India. Their voices represented Indian art not only in India but across the world. The critics also had an important role as curators of important exhibitions, re-defining modernism and Indian-art.

Indian Art got a boost with the economic liberalization of the country since the early 1990s. Artists from various fields now started bringing in varied styles of work. Post-liberalization Indian art thus works not only within the confines of academic traditions but also outside it. In this phase, artists have introduced even newer concepts which have hitherto not been seen in Indian art. Devajyoti Ray has introduced a new genre of art called Pseudorealism. Pseudorealist Art is an original art style that has been developed entirely on the Indian soil. Pseudorealism takes into account the Indian concept of abstraction and uses it to transform regular scenes of Indian life into a fantastic images.

== Vernacular Indian painting ==
Vernacular art is an art alive (contemporary art), based on the past (the myths, the traditions and the religion) and made by defined groups. Vernacular art is based on the collective memory of this group.

Examples of vernacular Indian painting:

Tribal painting:

- Bhil painting or Pithora Painting
- Warli painting
- Gond painting
- Santhal painting
- Saora painting
- Kurumba painting

Rural painting:

- Pattachitra painting
- Madhubani painting
- Bhojpuri painting
- Manjusha painting
- Kalamkari painting
- Kolam painting
- Kalam painting
- Mandana painting

== Gallery ==
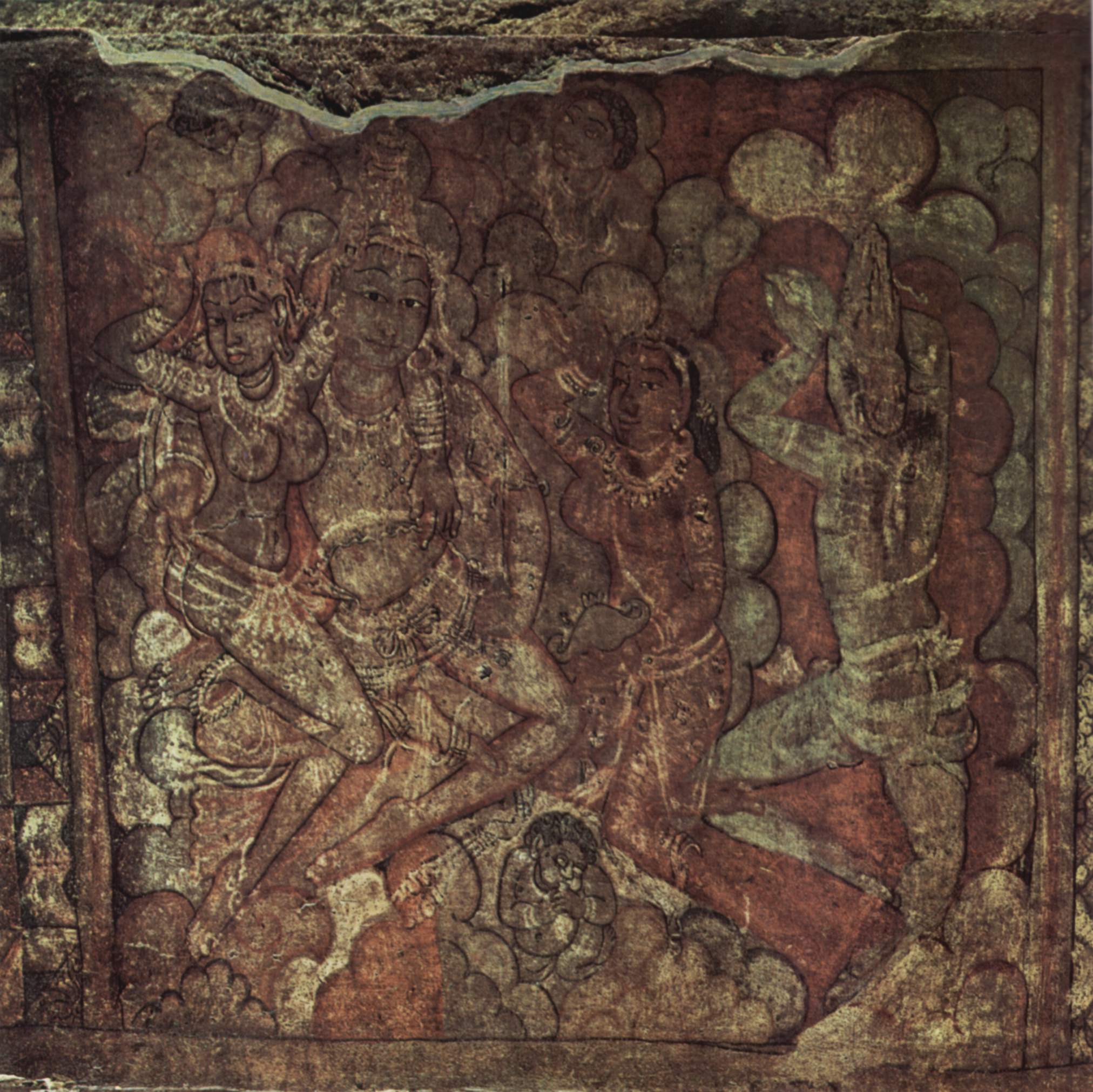

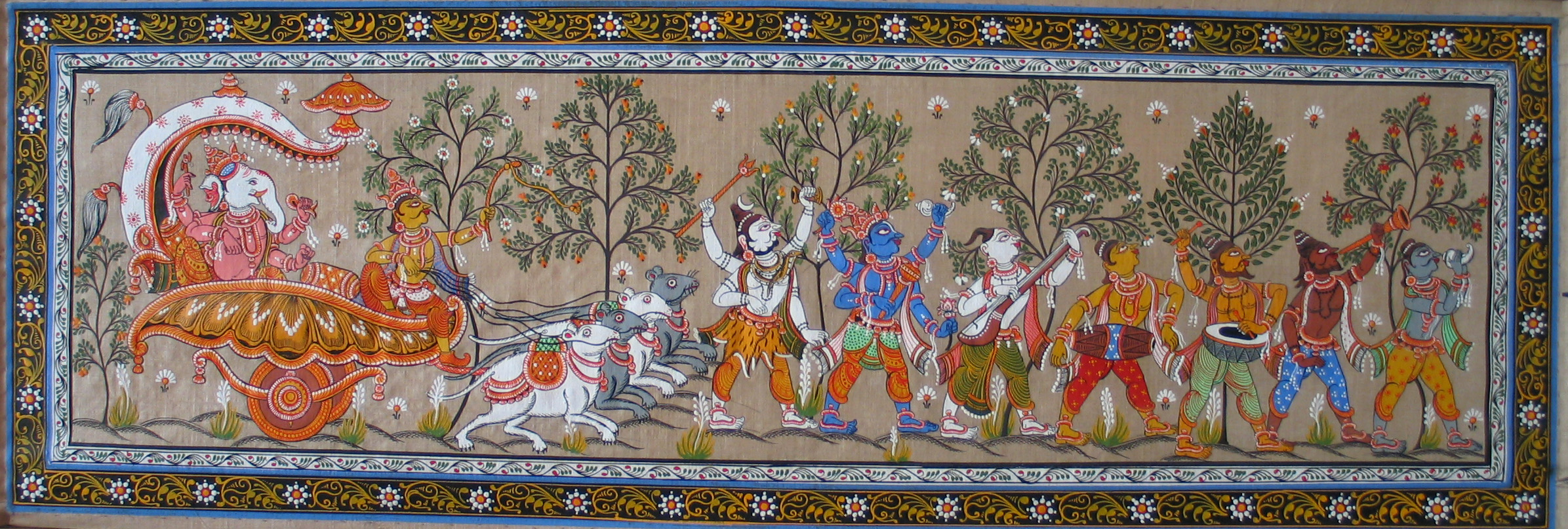

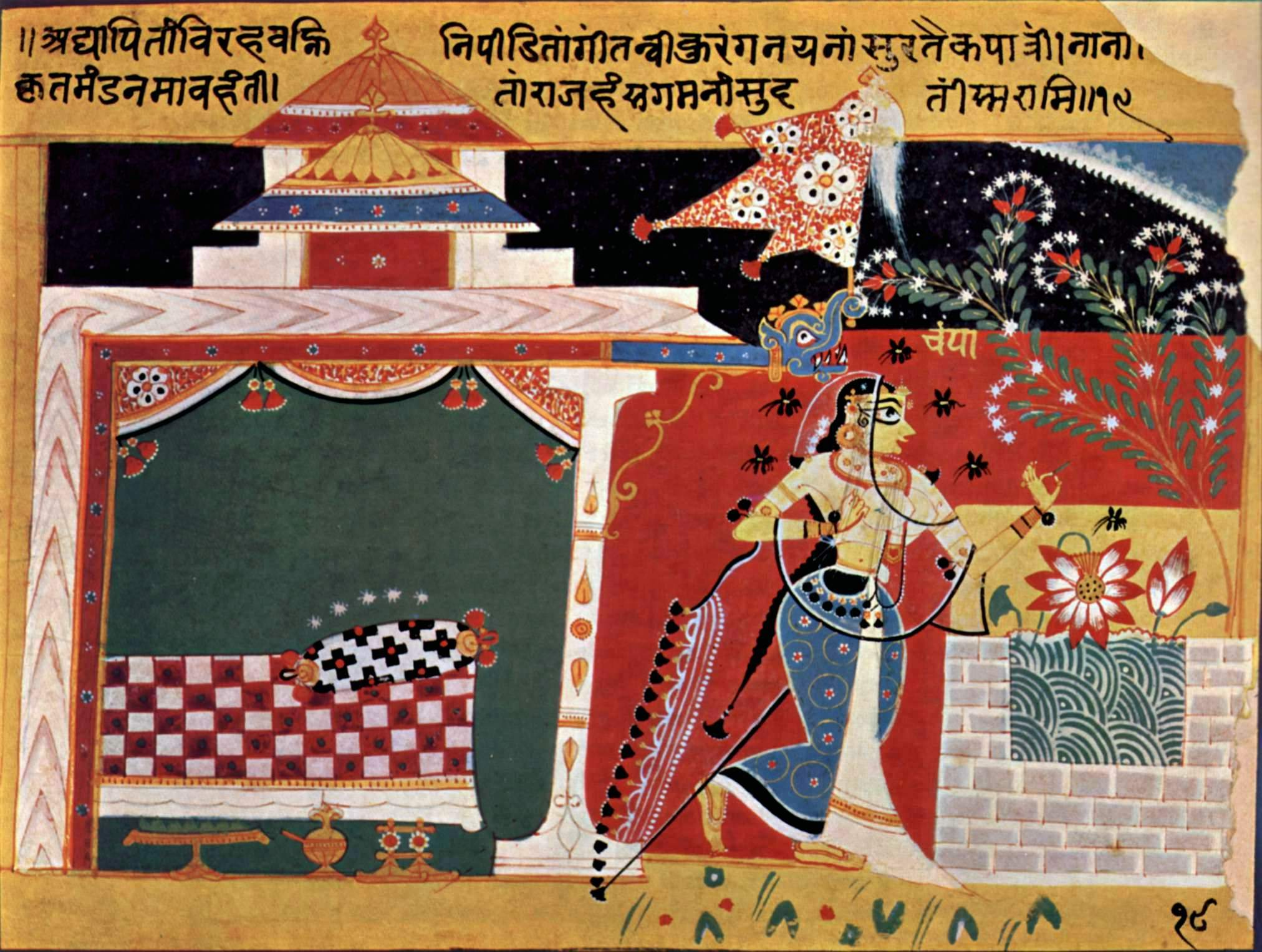

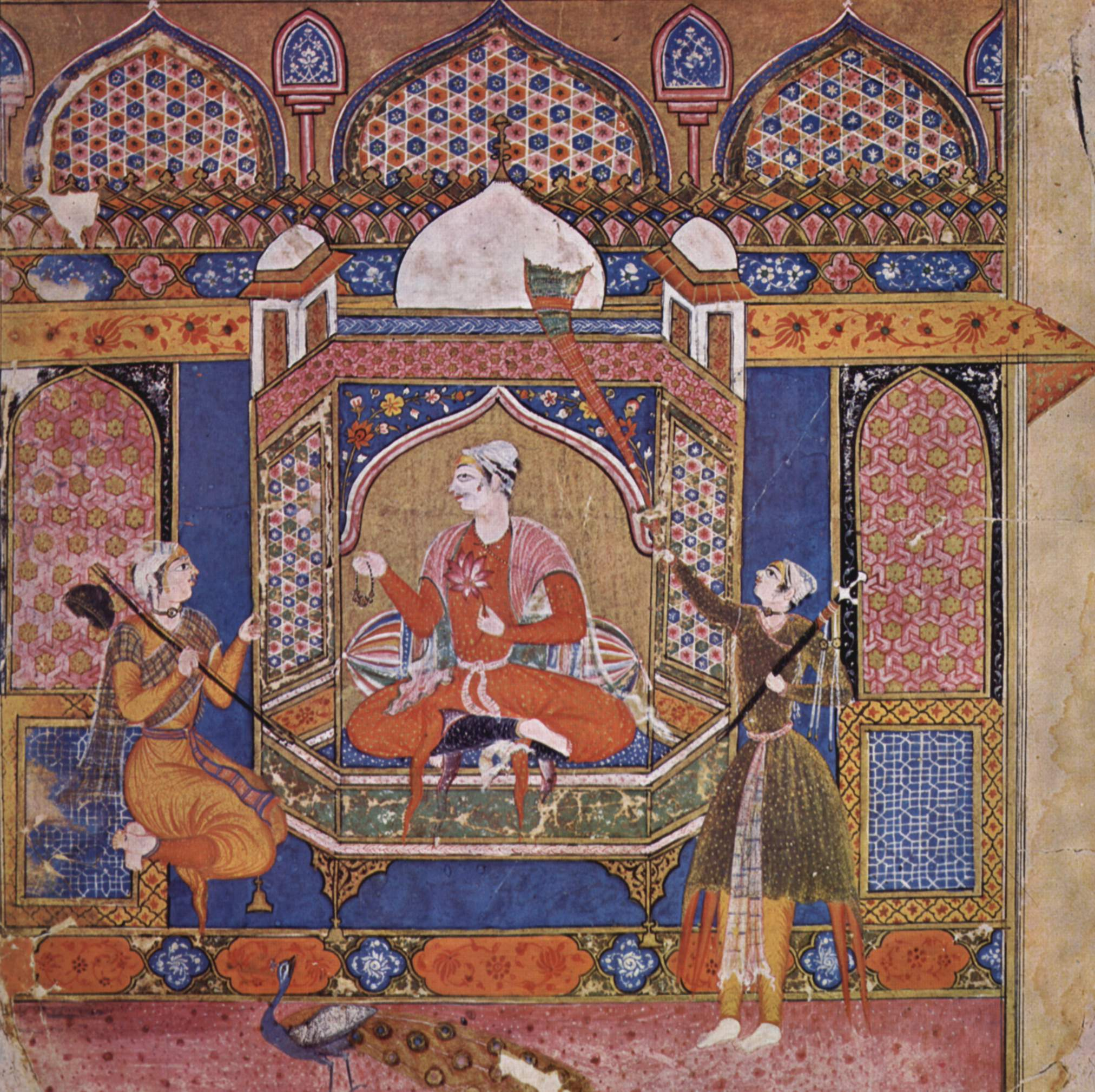

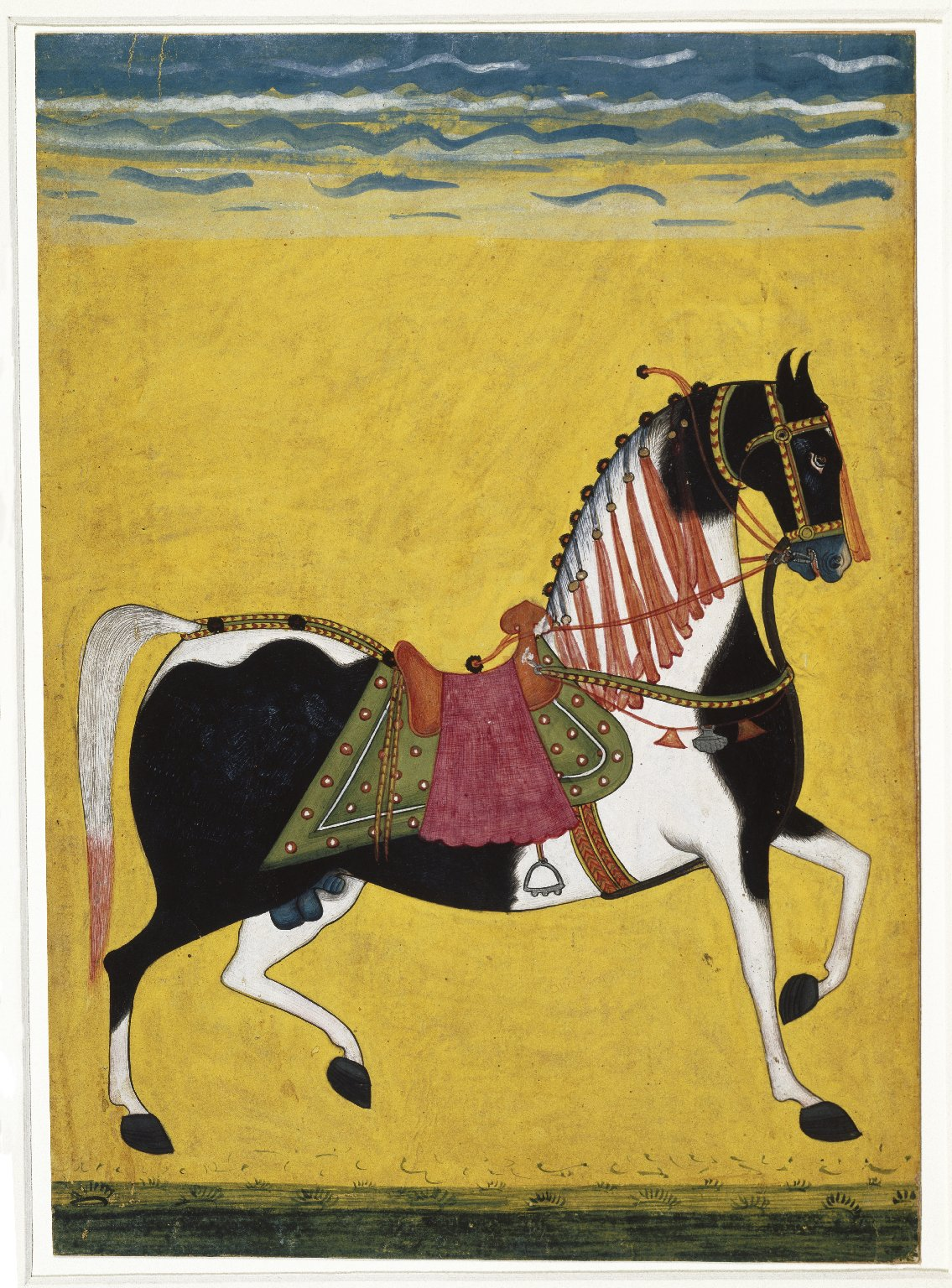

== Some notable Indian paintings ==
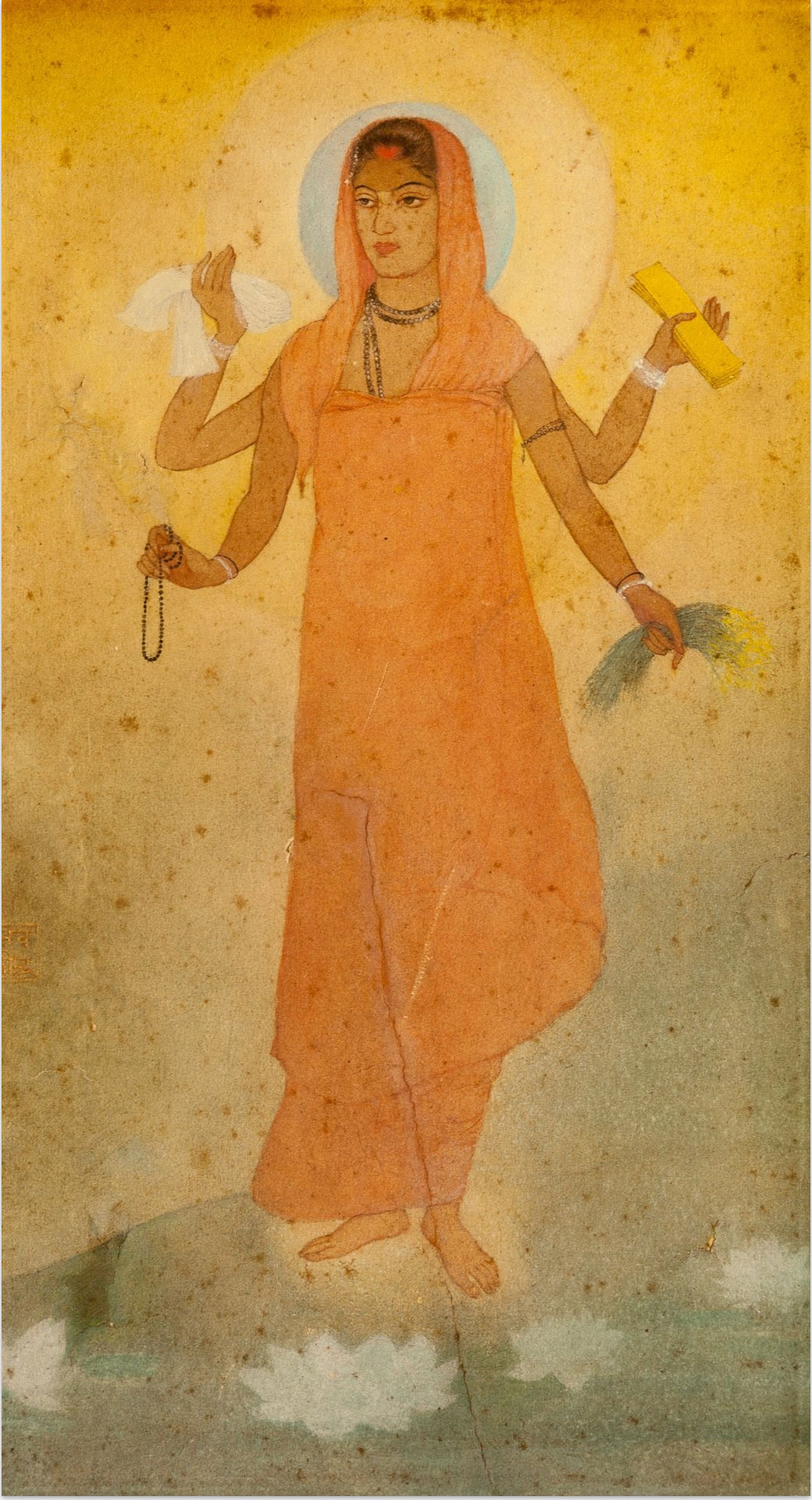
Bharat Mata by Abanindranath Tagore (1871–1951), a personification of India

- Hemen Majumdar's Lady with the Lamp
- Rabindranath Tagore's Self portrait
- Abanindranath Tagore's Bharat Mata
- Aman Singh Gulati's Almond Portraits series
- Raja Ravi Varma's Shakuntala
- Ramkinkar Baij's Jakkha O Jakkhi
- Bikash Bhattacharjee's Doll-series
- Geeta Vadhera's Jogia Dhoop series
- MF Hussain's Horses-series
- Jamini Roy's Jesus
- John Wilkins's Gossip
- Rakesh Vijay Persian and Mogul styles
- Jainul Abedin's Series on Bengal Famine
- Sunil Das's Bull series
- Devajyoti Ray's In Despair
- Tyeb Mehta's Mahisasur
- B. G. Sharma's Krishna miniatures

== See also ==
- Warli painting
- History of painting
- Eastern art history
- Cave paintings in India
- The Last Harvest: Paintings of Rabindranath Tagore
- Rabindra Chitravali
