= Realism =

Realism, Realistic, or Realists may refer to:

== In the arts ==
- Realism (arts), the general attempt to depict subjects truthfully in different forms of the arts

Arts movements related to realism include:

- Aesthetic Realism
- American Realism
- Classical Realism
- Literary realism, a movement from the mid-19th to the early 20th century
- Magical realism, a genre of fiction and art that blurs the line between speculation and reality
- Neorealism (art) (including Italian neorealism and Indian neorealism)
- New realism, a movement founded in 1960
- Realism (art movement), 19th-century painting group
- Realistic Manifesto
- Theatrical realism, one of the many types of theatre such as Naturalism
- Vienna School of Fantastic Realism, an art movement
- Social realism
- Socialist realism, an art style developed in the Soviet Union

== In philosophy ==
- Philosophical realism

Realist approaches in philosophy include:

- Aesthetic realism (metaphysics)
- Agential realism
- Aristotelian realism
- Australian realism
- Austrian realism
- Christian realism
- Common sense realism
- Conceptualist realism
- Constructive realism
- Cornell realism
- Critical realism (disambiguation)
- Dialectical realism
- Empirical realism
- Entity realism
- Epistemic/ontic structural realism
- Epistemological realism
- Hermeneutic realism
- Internal/pragmatic realism
- Local realism
- Logical realism
- Manifest realism
- Metaphysical realism
- Modal realism
- Model-dependent realism
- Moderate realism
- Moral realism
- Mystical realism
- Naïve realism
- New realism (philosophy)
- Peircean realism
- Perspectival realism
- Platonic realism
- Pluralistic realism
- Quasi-realism
- Rational realism
- Realistic monism
- Realistic rationalism
- Referential realism
- Relational realism
- Representational realism
- Romantic realism
- Scientific realism
  - Musgrave's scientific realism
- Scotistic realism
- Semantic realism (epistemology)
- Semantic realism (philosophy of science)
- Semi-realism
- Set-theoretic realism
- Speculative realism
- Spiritual realism
- Subtle realism
- Theological critical realism
- Transcendental realism
- Truth-value link realism

== In the social sciences ==
Realist approaches in the social sciences include:

- Ethnographic realism, either a descriptive word, i.e. of or relating to the first-hand participant-observation practices of ethnographers, or a writing style or genre that narrates in a similar fashion
- Legal realism, the view that jurisprudence should emulate the methods of natural science, i.e., rely on empirical evidence
  - New legal realism
- Realism (international relations), the view that world politics is driven by competitive self-interest
  - Classical realism (international relations)
  - Neorealism (international relations)
- Structural realism, in international relations
- Subtle realism, in social science research methodology

== Media ==
- Realistic (album), by Ivy
- Realism (Steril album), by Steril
- Realism (The Magnetic Fields album), an album by The Magnetic Fields
- The Realist (American magazine), a satirical magazine
- The Realist (British magazine), a magazine dedicated to scientific humanism

== Politics ==
- Czech Realist Party, former political party in Austria-Hungary
- Realists (political party), conservative political party in the Czech Republic

== Other uses ==
- Realistic (brand), a brand of home audio electronics produced by RadioShack

== See also ==
- Anti-realism
- Classical realism (disambiguation)
- Critical realism (disambiguation)
- Depressive realism
- Digitalism
- Idealism (disambiguation)
- Irrealism (disambiguation)
- Neorealism (disambiguation)
- Pseudorealism
- Raëlism
- Reality
- Real (disambiguation)
