= Parshuram Gangavane =

Indian folk artist (born 1955)

Parshuram Atmaram Gangavane (born c. 1955) is an Indian puppeteer and folk artist from the Sindhudurg district of Maharashtra. He is a practitioner of Chitrakathi, a traditional folk art that combines storytelling with visual illustrations and music. In 2021, Gangavane was awarded the Padma Shri, India's fourth-highest civilian honor, for his efforts in preserving and promoting the 500-year-old art form.

== Background and early life ==
Gangavane belongs to the Thakar tribal community and resides in Pinguli, a village in the Kudal taluka. Historically, his ancestors served as spies for Chhatrapati Shivaji Maharaj, using their traveling performances as a cover to gather intelligence and relay messages to the Maratha ruler.

Growing up, Gangavane learned the arts of Chitrakathi, string puppetry (Kalsutri Bahulya), and leather shadow puppetry (Charmachitraya) from his father and grandfather. Due to the lack of financial viability in folk art during his youth, he worked as a circular-saw operator at a local sawmill and later as a grass-cutter at a government farm to support his family.

== Preservation of Chitrakathi ==
In the 1970s, realizing that the Chitrakathi tradition was nearing extinction, Gangavane dedicated himself to its revival. He converted a portion of his family's ancestral cowshed into a museum and art gallery called the "Thakar Adivasi Kala Aangan." The museum houses a collection of centuries-old paintings, puppets, and traditional musical instruments.

Chitrakathi involves narrating stories from epics like the Ramayana, Mahabharata, and the life of Chhatrapati Shivaji Maharaj using handmade paper paintings. These paintings are traditionally made using natural colors derived from stones, leaves, and minerals. Gangavane's performances are accompanied by traditional instruments, including the veena, chipri (cymbals), and huduk (a small drum).

Gangavane conducts workshops and training sessions for younger generations to ensure the survival of the craft. His sons, Chetan and Eknath, have also joined him in performing and managing the cultural center.

== Awards and recognition ==
In January 2021, the Government of India conferred the Padma Shri on Gangavane for his contributions to the arts. He has also received several state-level awards, including the Dr. Babasaheb Ambedkar Dalit Mitra Award and the Ahilyabai Holkar Award.
