= List of most expensive Indian artists =

This collection groups together the artists of India most valued by auction houses, critics and private collectors. On average, their paintings sell for over $500,000.

This list is not exhaustive.

== List of paintings ==
Painting	Artist	Price	Year	References
Untitled	Vasudeo S. Gaitonde	$4.4 million	2015	
Saurashtra	S H Raza	$3.49 million	2010	
Self-Portrait	Amrita Sher-Gil	$2.92 million	2015	
La Terre	S H Raza	$2.54 million	2008	

== Artists ==
- S H Raza (born 22 February 1922 - 23 July 2016) was a famous Indian artist who lived and worked in France since 1950, but maintained strong ties with India. His works were mainly abstracts in oil or acrylic, with a very rich use of color. Raza became India's most expensive modern artist on 10 June 2010, when the painting titled Saurashtra sold for $3,486,965 at a Christie's auction.
- Tyeb Mehta lived from 25 July 1925 to 2 July 2009. In 2002, one of his paintings sold at a Christie's auction for Rs 8 crore, which was not only the highest sum for an Indian painting at an international auction at that time, but also triggered the subsequent great Indian art boom.
- John Wilkins (1927–1991), was an Indian artist whose works have been rated in the league of the greatest by art critics. His paintings are valued highly, and many are in the collections of select art collectors, business houses and Government institutions. Some of his most famous works include Gossip, Sneha- village belle and Market Seller.
- Vasudeo S. Gaitonde (1924–2001) had a reputation as India's foremost abstract artist. An untitled abstract by Gaitonde sold for Rs 92 lakh at an Osians auction, the highest amount paid for a contemporary Indian painting at the time. Gaitonde died in 2002. In 2013, one of Gaitonde's untitled painting sold for ₹237 million (US$2.5 million), set a record for an Indian artist at Christie's debut auction in India.
- Amrita Sher-Gil (January 30, 1913 – December 5, 1941) was an eminent Indian painter, today considered an important women painter of 20th-century India, whose legacy stands on a par with that of the Masters of the Bengal Renaissance. Her painting Village Scene fetched Rs 6.9 crore at Osians auction in March 2006.
- Subodh Gupta (born 1964) is an artist based in New Delhi; he was born in Khagaul, Patna. His sculpture of brass and stainless steel utensils was sold for $80,000 in April 2010.
- Maqbool Fida Husain (born 17 September 1915, Pandharpur, Maharashtra), popularly known as MF Husain, started his career as a billboard-painter. As of 2011, his paintings average at least 2 million dollars at an auction or private sale. After some controversy regarding his paintings in his home country, he was on a self-imposed exile from 2006. In January 2010 he was offered citizenship of Qatar, which he accepted.
- Sudarsan Pattnaik is world-renowned sand artist http://indianexpress.com/article/india/india-others/sudarshan-pattnaik-wins-at-world-cup-of-sand-sculpting/
