= Irrealism =

Irrealism has two main meanings:

- Irrealism (philosophy) in philosophy; the common name for a position first advanced by Nelson Goodman in Ways of Worldmaking.
- Irrealism (the arts) in the arts and critical theory refers to both a style that features an estrangement from our generally accepted sense of reality, and a critical theory that interprets other works in this manner.

== See also ==
- Realism (disambiguation)
