= Classical realism =

Classical realism may refer to:

- Classical Realism, an artistic movement in the late-20th and early 21st century
- Classical realism (international relations), a theory established in the post-World War II era

== See also ==
- Realism (disambiguation)
