= Neorealism =

Neorealism may refer to:

- Neorealism (art)
  - Italian neorealism (film)
  - Indian neorealism or parallel cinema
  - Nouveau réalisme [LIT: New Realism] (1960s France)
- Neorealism (international relations)
- New realism (philosophy)

== See also ==
- Realism (disambiguation)
