= M F Pithawalla =

Indian painter (1872–1937)

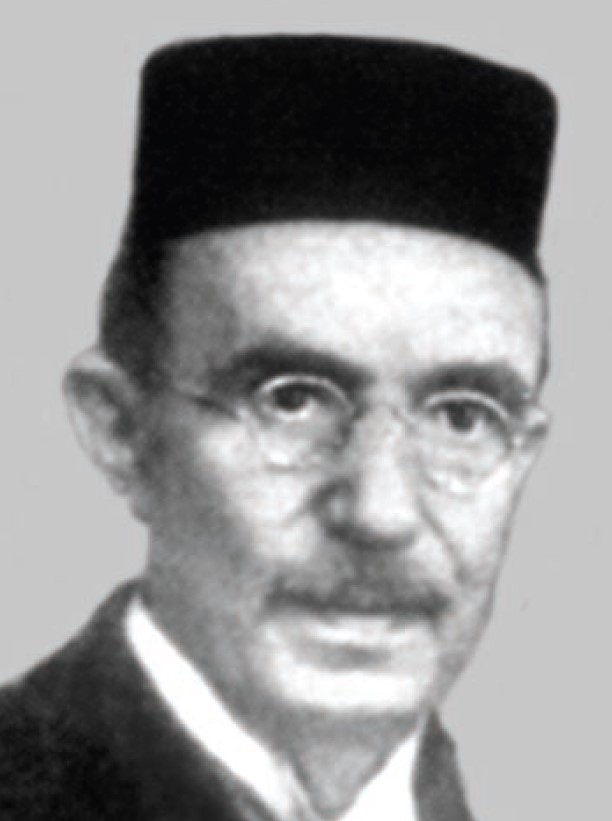
- Born: 1872; Pitha, Surat, British Raj
- Died: 1937 (aged 64–65)
- Known for: Painting

Manchershaw Fakirjee Pithawalla (1872–1937) was an important painter of the Bombay School in the early 20th century.

== Early life ==
M. F. Pithawalla was born in Pitha, Surat. He moved to Bombay following his father's death in 1888. He was discovered and trained by John Griffiths, the principal of Sir Jamsetjee Jeejebhoy School of Art.

== Career ==
His first showing at the Bombay Fine Arts exhibition won him a silver medal. Thereafter, he began exhibiting widely at shows in Simla, Bombay, Darjeeling, Madras and Pune. Pithawalla was a regular prize winner at exhibitions of art societies across India. He was the only artist to win three successive prizes at the Bombay Art Society, including a gold medal in 1908.

In 1911, Pithawalla left for Europe, visiting Italy, Paris and London. He had a one-man show at the Dore Gallery in London in October, 1911. Later, his portrait of Sir Jamsetjee Jeejebhoy was displayed in an exhibition of "Modern Indian Art" at the New Burlington Galleries in London in 1934. His talent for portraiture drew praise in London. The art critic Sir George Birdwood wrote an article in his appreciation and commented on his copies of Velasquez and Rembrandt paintings, "When slightly aged, it will be hard to distinguish them from the originals."

Pithawala's portraits document the ethos and hierarchy of the colonial establishment in India. He depicted members of the aristocracy and bourgeoisie, ladies and gentlemen of high standing – lawyers, landlords, elite merchants and their wives. He is also remembered for the album he was commissioned to make for Queen Mary on her Indian visit in 1905, containing watercolours of women from different Indian communities.

Pithawala served a 30-year term as a committee member of the Bombay Art Society and as vice-president of the Art Society of India.

== Exhibitions ==
- 1894 Bombay Fine Art Exhb., Bombay
- 1902 Exhb., Simla Fine Art Society, Simla
- 1907, 09, 39 Annual Exhb. Bombay Art Society, Bombay
- 1911 Solo exhb., Dore Gallery, London. Exhb. New Burlington Gallery, London. Exhb., Royal Society of Portrait Painting, London
- 1912 Exhb. inaugurated by Her Excellency Lady Clarke, Hall of Elphinstone High School, Bombay
- 2004 Manifestations II, organised by Delhi Art Gallery, Jehangir Art Gallery, Mumbai and Delhi Art Gallery, New Delhi

== Collections ==
- National Gallery of Modern Art, New Delhi
- Prince of Wales Museum, Mumbai
- Victoria and Albert Museum, London
- Gallery Chemould, Mumbai
- Jane and Kito de Boer, Dubai

== Awards ==
- 1894 awarded silver medal and cash prize of Rs. 70, Bombay Fine Art Exhb., Bombay
- 1907 gold medal, annual exhb., Bombay Art Society, Bombay
- 1908 gold medal, annual exhb., Bombay Art Society, Bombay
- 1909 gold medal, annual rxhb., Bombay Art Society, Bombay
- 1894–1911 awarded 24 gold and silver medals and 45 cash prizes
