= John Wilkins (Indian artist) =

Indian painter

John Wilkins (20 June 1927 at Kolar Gold Fields – 1991) was an Indian painter.

== Biography ==
Wilkins was one of the leading painters from India which include Tyeb Mehta, S.H. Raza, M.F. Husain, Francis Newton Souza, Akbar Padamsee and Manjit Bawa. His talent expressed itself in his works, in many styles, mediums and techniques – brush, sketch, commercial, fine art and portrait painting.

He was commissioned by corporations and individuals for designs, paintings, portraits and illustrations. He started his career by painting billboards and then went on to be art director with different advertising agencies before quitting to concentrate on his painting.

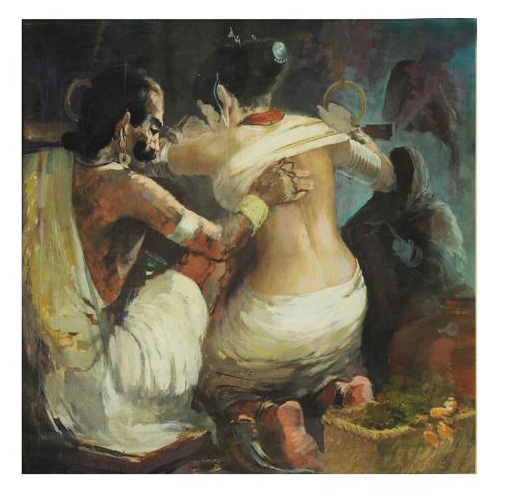
Masseur by John Wilkins

His personal life was turbulent. Married to his art, he hated to be disturbed at his work. While working for the Advertising Agency - Graphic Arts Industries in Bangalore he broke the nose of an executive who disturbed his work. In the late 1970s he left his home and family to work at his art as a recluse in Coimbatore and later in New Delhi. Some of his paintings are unsigned and some not completed.

Most of his paintings are held by private collectors, a few corporates and also government departments like the British High Commission and the Singapore High Commission. He had few exhibitions of his work, the last in New Delhi in 1982. In February 2010 an offer of $2.5 million for one of his paintings by a member of one of the Royal families from the Middle East was refused by an art collector in India.

He died in 1991 in Trichy, Tamil Nadu, and was buried there at St. Christopher's Church.

== See also ==
- List of most expensive Indian artists
