= Critical realism =

Critical realism may refer to:

- Critical realism (philosophy of perception), a perspective that states that some sense-data are accurate to external objects
- Critical realism (philosophy of the social sciences), philosophical approach associated with Roy Bhaskar
- Theological critical realism, a term used in the religion–science interface community
- Social realism, particularly applied to art
