= Constructive realism =

Branch of the philosophy of science

Constructive realism is a branch of philosophy, specifically the philosophy of science. It was developed in the late 1950s by Jane Loevinger and elaborated in the 1980s by Friedrich Wallner in Vienna.

== Overview ==
In his "A New Vision of Science" (1998), Wallner describes it as follows:

Traditional convictions regarding science (such as universalism, necessity and eternal validity) are currently in doubt. Relativism seems to destroy scientific claims to rationality. This paper shows a way to keep the traditional convictions of scientific knowledge while acknowledging relativism. With reference to the practicing scientist, we replace descriptivism with constructivism; we modify relative validity with the claim to understanding; and, we offer methodological strategies for acquiring understanding. These strategies we call strangification, which means taking a scientific proposition system out of its context and putting it in another context. We can thus see the implicit presuppositions of the given proposition system by means of the problems arising out of the application of this procedure. Such a change in the understanding of science holds important consequences.

Within the philosophy of measurement, Jane Loevinger described the relation between a construct (scientific model or construction of reality) and the reality itself. Now referred to as "construct realism", recognized chiefly in philosophy of measurement (psychometrics), Loevinger's view is expressed in the following quote in the context of real human traits (cognitive and/or behavioral patterns that tend to occur together):

A dictionary (122) definition of construct is: "Something constructed; specif., Psychol., an intellectual synthesis." In the present paper both construct and trait are used in their general or dictionary meanings. Connotations of depth, level, or locus are specifically disclaimed. Traits exist in people; constructs (here usually about traits) exist in the minds and magazines of psychologists. People have constructs too, but that is outside the present scope. Construct connotes construction and artifice; yet what is at issue is validity with respect to exactly what the psychologist does not construct: the validity of the test as a measure of traits which exist prior to and independently of the psychologist's act of measuring. It is true that psychologists never know traits directly but only through the glass of their constructs, but the data to be judged are manifestations of traits, not manifestations of constructs. Cronbach and Meehl and their colleagues on the APA committee appear reluctant to assign reality to constructs or traits. Considering traits as real is, in the present view, a working stance and not a philosophical tenet." [Italics added] That the distinction made here between traits and constructs is free of metaphysical implications is seen by comparing it to the familiar distinction between parameter and statistic. The parameter is what we aim to estimate; the corresponding statistic represents our current best estimate of it. Just so, the trait is what we aim to understand, and the corresponding construct represents our current best understanding of it. The distinction between trait and construct can be dispensed with no better than the distinction between parameter and statistic.

== See also ==
- Social constructionism
