= Devajyoti Ray =

Indian painter and installation artist

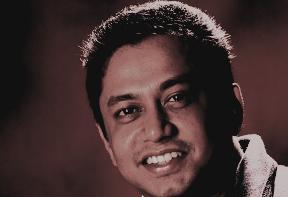
- Born: India
- Known for: Visual art and installation art
- Movement: Pseudorealism

Devajyoti Ray is an Indian painter and installation artist whose works attained significance in the post-liberalization phase of the Indian economy. His works have been exhibited internationally and have been acquired by many art academies. Devajyoti Ray is primarily known for his particular genre of work called Pseudorealism, which involves the use of offbeat colours and abstract shapes to arrive at an imagery which looks as comprehensible as real. Devajyoti Ray lives and works in Delhi, Mumbai, Bangalore and Kolkata.

== Life ==
Partly trained under Indian collagist Balraj Panesar, Ray has developed a style of his own which has often been described as Pseudorealism. It was noted as an original Indian Art form, that has since been written about widely in the art media.
