= Pseudorealism =

Art movement

Pseudorealism, also spelled pseudo-realism, is a term used in a variety of discourses connoting artistic and dramatic techniques, or work of art, film and literature perceived as superficial, not-real, or non-realistic. By definition, the term is highly subjective.

== Synopsis ==
The term pseudo-realism has been used to describe a certain type of cultural commodities such as film productions and TV programmes which portray everyday life in excessively realistic detail in order to achieve greater impact on viewers.

== Examples ==
Following the great shift towards expressionism in painting, André Bazin used the word pseudoreal in reference to mechanical means which freed the plastic arts from the drive toward 'unachievable likeness'. Meanwhile, photorealistic CGI animation and 3D computer graphics used today have become indistinguishable from cine-photography. In that regard, the special effects augmenting feature film through photographic deception of the eye have gained an entirely different dimension. Computer generated imagery and 3D animation are used not only to bolster reality based images but also to create imaginary worlds.

We understand the CGI feature film to be an image of pseudorealism in Bazin’s terms – a fundamental deception of the eye. Of course the cinema itself in whatever incarnation involves a deception of the eye, that of the ‘persistence of vision’ effect. Though things appear to exist and have causal properties, they are the product of man-made parameters. — David Surman, "CGI Animation: Pseudorealism, Perception and Possible Worlds"

Christopher Hitchens equates pseudo-realism with Socialist realism of the Stalinist era as exposed by Orwell. Others invoke the old pseudo-real traditions of Indian film with no negative characters.

Another example of this type of art are the works of Devajyoti Ray.

== See also ==
- Neorealism
- Cinephilia
- Film theory
