= Chitrakathi =

Visual art form for storytelling

The Chitrakathi is the name of an occupational caste whose traditional livelihood was to narrate stories aided with pictures sojourning various places.

== History ==
The term Chitrakathi is the conjunction of two words: chitra meaning picture and katha meaning story. With this application, a Chitrakathi is the one who narrates stories with a visual aid. Thereby, one can imagine the rich tradition behind this art. In tribal life, there is a long-standing tradition of Chitrakathi's paintings. Wall paintings of Saora, Bhil, Gond and Warli are extremely popular in India and abroad. It's an almost extinct art form practiced by the Thakar tribal community of Maharashtra. Chitrakathi artists are a community of migrating story tellers found all over Maharashra and some parts of Andhra Pradesh and Karnataka. They made a series of single sheets of paintings. All paintings belonging to one story were kept in a bundle called pothi. The Theme of Chitrakathi paintings include stories on local versions of Ramayana and Mahabharata and mythical themes. Use of brownish tones of stone colors gives a remarkable effect. Figures in paintings were generally stylized. These traditional art forms were lost in the villages of Maharashtra but the Greatest king of all times, Chhatrapati Shivaji Maharaj who were a lover of art, showed this talent to the world. These stories were conserved during attacks in temples but after the times were better Maharaj revived them and honoured this beautiful artform.

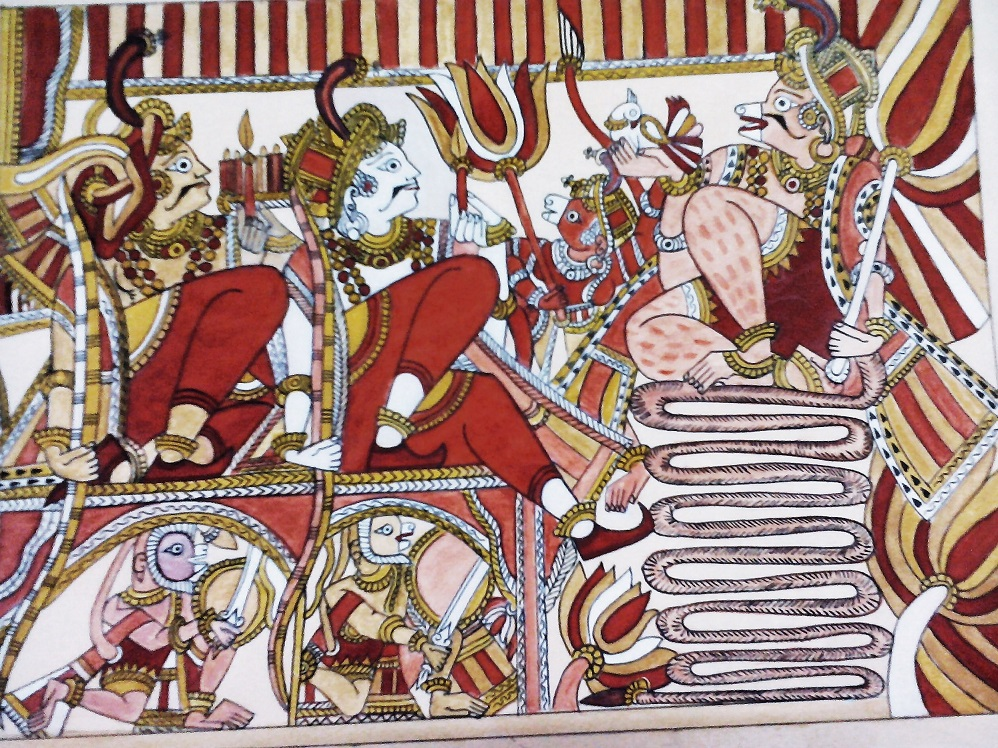
Chitrakathi Painting by Indira Sheshadri

== Origins ==
"Chitra" means picture and "katha" means story and the exponent called Chitrakathi is the person who narrates the story with the aid of some visual support. They sing the tale while showing it visually using pictures. This mostly depicts the gods and royals. "Broadly speaking, Chitrakatha is identified in three forms, Leather shadow puppets, Stringed wooden puppets and Picture stories. The latter only, now, is identified as 'Chitrakathi.

Artists use the term "Pothi" to set of pictures which contains 30 to 50 pages arranged in chronological order. These pages are unbound like pages of Ramayana and Mahabharata previously one artist used to keep 40 to 50 Pothis but today fortunately 15 to 20 Pothis are in good condition. Some pothis date back to 300 years whereas some 50 to 60 years old. The art of story telling may become extinct in less than a decade and half unless effective steps are taken by the government to preserve it.

== Artists and awards ==
Some prominent Chitrakathi artists are Jayashree Patankar, Alaka Bhandiwad, Indira Seshadri, Meenakshi Madan, Rajasri Manikandan, V Shanmughapriya, Shobha Rajagopalan, S Suresh and Vaishnavi Srikanth.
