= I F P =

Multi-domain Creative festival in Asia

IFP
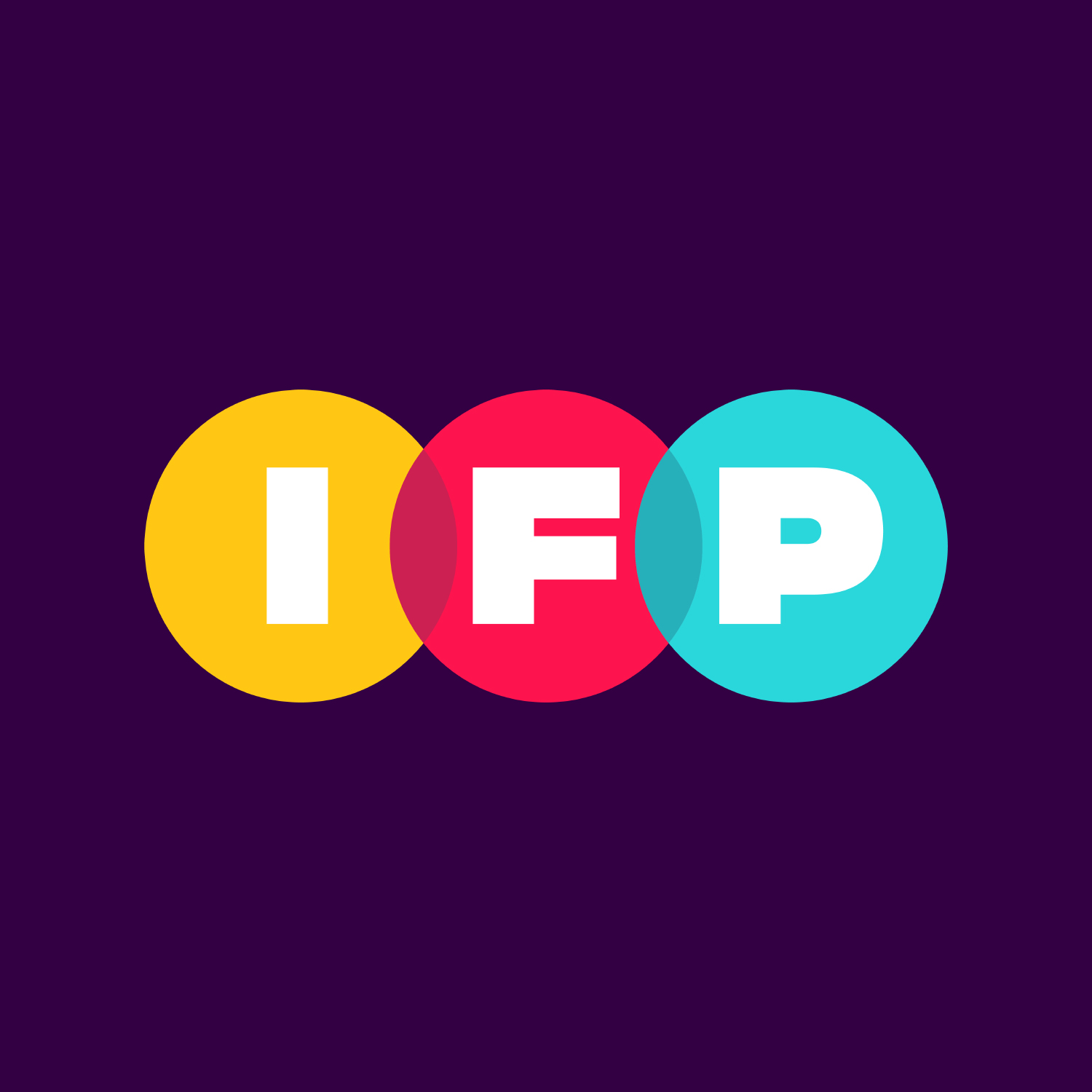
- Genre: Multi-disciplinary Creative Festival
- Locations: Mumbai, India
- Years active: 15
- Founded: 2011
- Founder: Ritam Bhatnagar
- Next event: August to October 2025
- Attendance: 2024: 64,328
- Website: ifp.world

IFP (formerly India Film Project) is a multi-disciplinary creative and cultural festival held annually in Mumbai, India. The event is renowned for its six 50 Hour time-bound challenges and a subsequent two-day multi-stage festival.

The festival's hallmark is its 50 Hour challenges, attracting participants from over 42 countries. These challenges include the 50 Hour Filmmaking Challenge, 50 Hour Music Challenge, 50 Hour Design Challenge, 50 Hour Photography Challenge, 50 Hour Writing Challenge, and 50 Hour Performing Arts Challenge. The 50 Hour Filmmaking Challenge, launched in 2011, is the oldest and flagship competition. In 2024, the challenges drew over 53,000 participants worldwide.

Following the completion of the challenges, the festival culminates in a two-day event in Mumbai. This gathering features prominent figures across various domains, including film, music, literature, digital media, audio & podcasting, design & visual art, photography, performing arts, advertising, gaming, technology, and culture, who engage with audiences through interactive sessions.

== History ==
IFP was started by Ritam Bhatnagar in 2011 as the Ahmedabad Film Project, a filmmaking competition for local filmmakers. In 2013 it was renamed the India Film Project, admitting entrants from other countries from 2014. The 14th edition held in October 2024 received entries from over 550 cities and 43 countries. In 2022, the festival was renamed as 'IFP' owing to festival expanding horizons from films to other creative domains such as digital, literature & writing, OTT, storytelling, visual art, performing arts, audio and podcasting, photography, gaming, tech and culture.

=== Season 1 ===
The first Ahmedabad Film Project in 2011 received 86 entries from 18 cities. Filmmaker Sanjay Gadhvi was the jury member. More than 600 filmmakers participated in the event. The theme for the filmmaking competition was 'Small things in life'. As founder Ritam says, "The motive of beginning this festival was to attract people towards filmmaking, considered a niche hobby back then". "The festival was meant to be a one-time activity, but the response was too good to make it an annual happening" he adds.

=== Season 2 ===
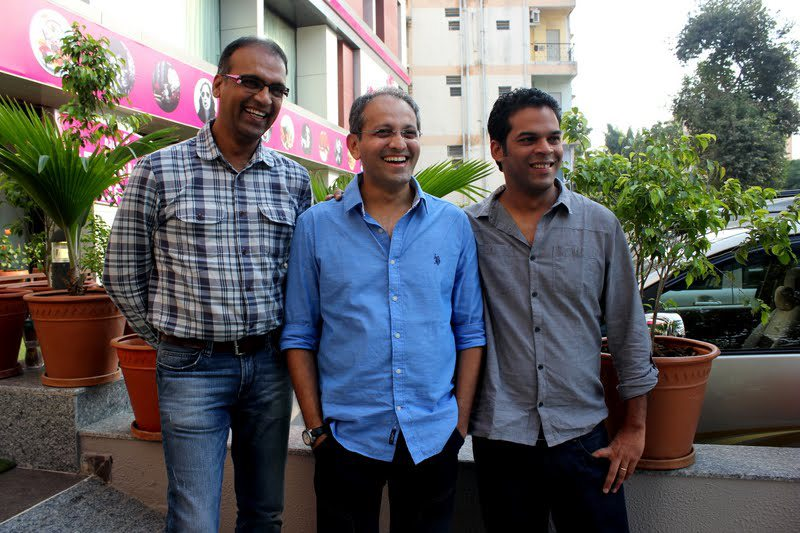
IFP 2012 Jury Members Vikramaditya Motwane, Komal Nahta and Rajesh Mapuskar

The 2012 Edition saw more than 1200 filmmakers, 120 teams from 24 cities across India, competing against each other to win the title of Best Film. Well-known Filmmakers like Shoojit Sircar, Vikramaditya Motwane, Rajesh Mapuskar and Komal Nahta were part of the jury. The theme 'Ingredients of Good Living' caught well with the filmmakers with some of the best films coming out of the competition.

=== Season 3 ===
The 2013 Edition of India Film Project saw as many as 4200+ filmmakers from 40 cities across India and neighbouring countries. The film project went online by allowing participants to shoot films from their own cities and uploading online. The project extended their filmmaking hours from 48 hours to 50 hours. The project kicked off on 20 September 2014. Versatile and award-winning filmmakers like Tigmanshu Dhulia, Nikhil Advani and Bejoy Nambiar served as the jury members. For the first time in India, an online film festival was a part of 2013 edition in association with NFDC, which allowed everyone to watch their favourite films online on their computer screen. The winning films of 2013 edition received amazing response such that they were selected for Jaipur International Film Festival for special screening.

=== Season 4 ===
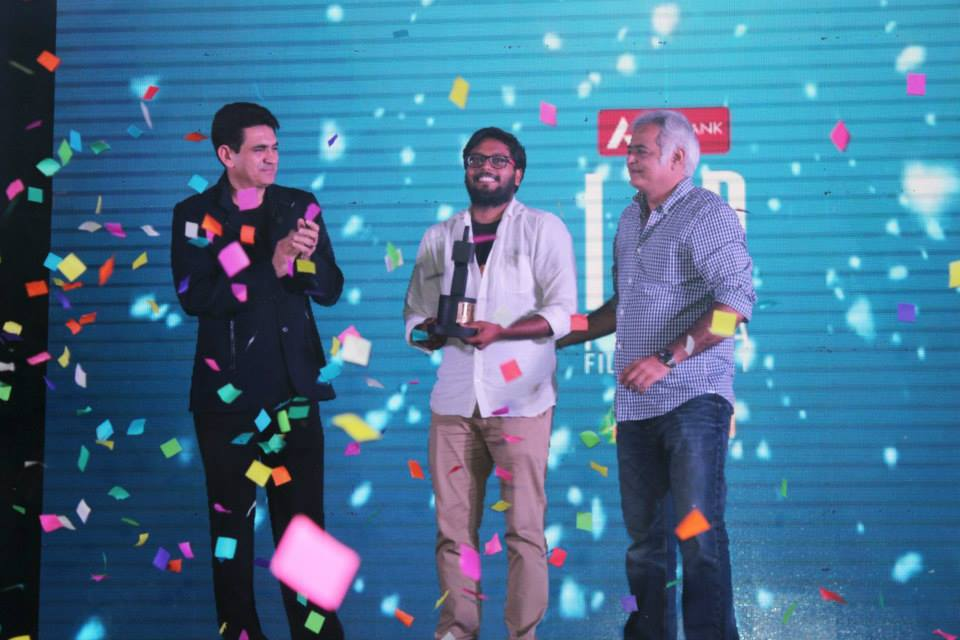
IFP 2014 winner along with Jury Hansal Mehta and Omung Kumar

The 2014 edition of IFP was announced on 28 May. The festival claimed to reach out to filmmakers from smaller towns and other countries through previous year's winning film screenings. The official trailer of 2014 edition was revealed on 4 June, which featured a military theme. The trailer was shot with extensive use of VFX and sent out the message 'Shoot before you get shot'.

The jury for 2014 edition was announced in First week of August. The jury consisted of Indian cinema's Shyam Benegal and filmmakers Hansal Mehta, Omung Kumar and Umesh Shukla.

More than 8500 filmmakers participated in the edition from 85 cities across the world, mostly India, Singapore, Nepal, Pakistan, Indonesia, Dubai, USA and UK. Almost 500 films were made in the challenge over the 50 hours beginning on 12 September 2014.

=== Season 5 ===
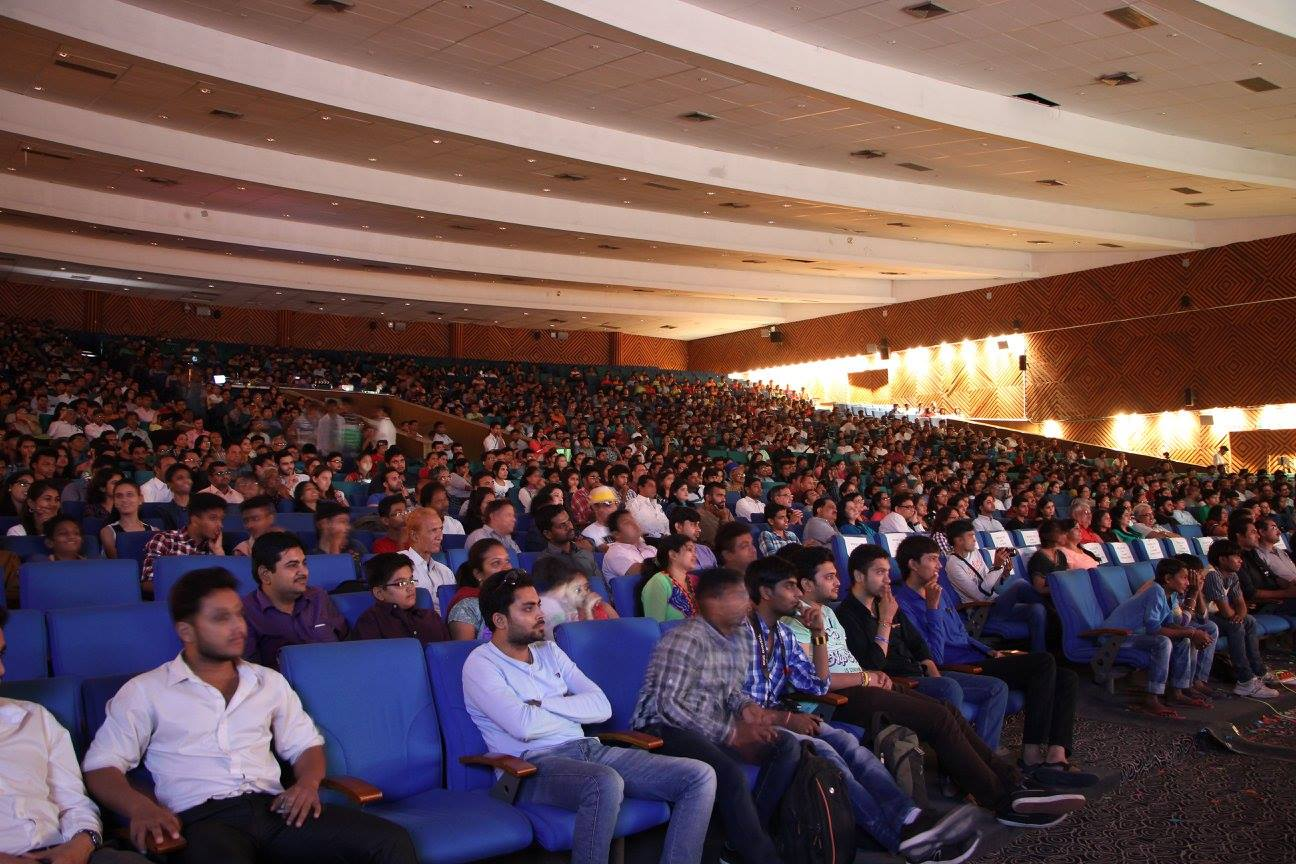
Audiences at the fifth edition of IFP

The 2015 edition of IFP took the wings off festival to make it truly international. More than 14000 filmmakers are said to participate in this edition from 18 countries. The fifth season was announced on 15 May 2015 and the trailer was released on 15 June. The 2015 trailer was shot using a technique called visual illusion and garnered huge popularity amongst participants.

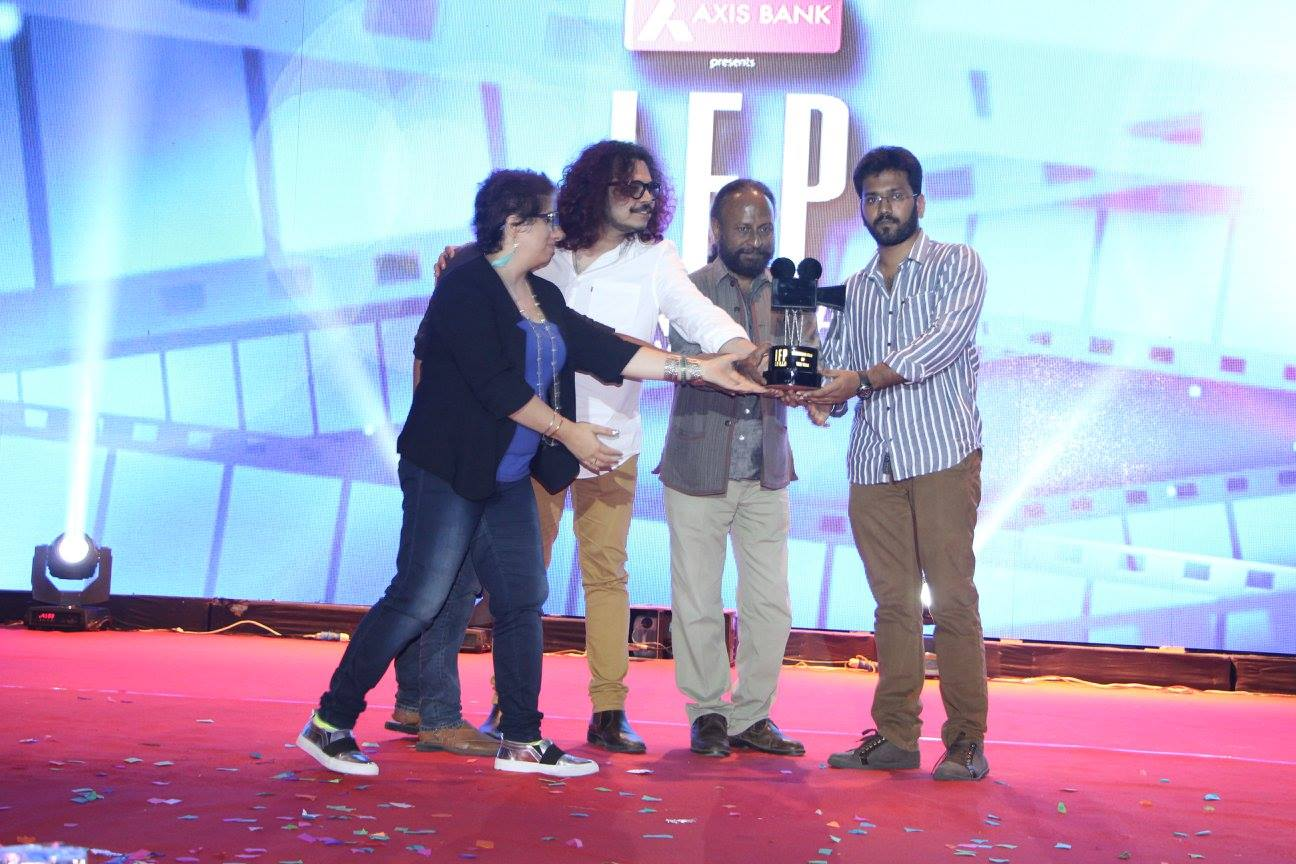
IFP 2015 Winner Vijay Velukutty receiving trophy from Jury Ketan Mehta, Guneet Monga and Raja Sen.

The festival lined up some very prominent faces of Bollywood who came forward as jury members. Two times National award winners Ketan Mehta and Onir along with film critic Raja Sen took up the mammoth task of judging 700+ films. The festival also saw its first female jury member Guneet Monga who was much appraised by the festival fans.

The festival saw participation from south Indian states such as Telangana, AP, Karnataka and Tamil Nadu. Apart from India, participation was seen from USA, UK, Germany, Singapore, Dubai, Australia, Sri Lanka, Bhutan, Pakistan, Malaysia and other countries. The filmmaking hours started on 18 September and ended on 20 September.

=== Season 6 ===
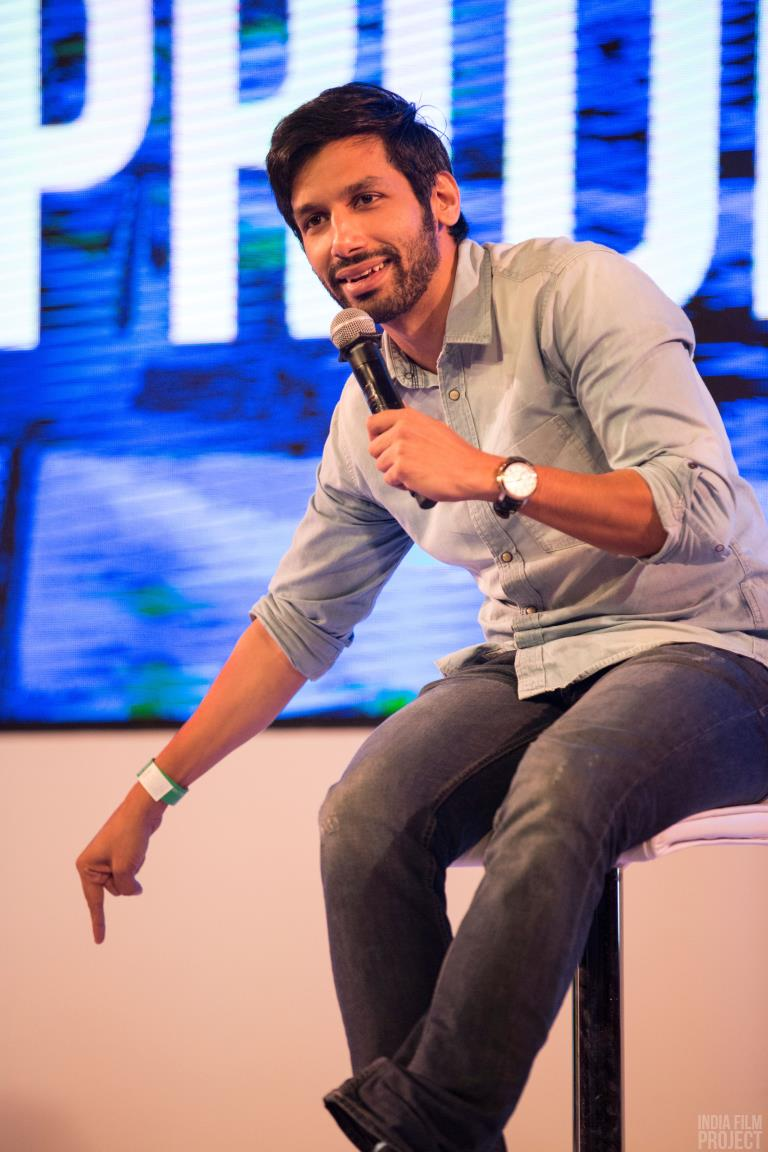
Kanan Gill engages with audience

IFP 2016 was the festival's first edition to be held outside Ahmedabad. The festival officially moved to Mumbai as its new home ground. The 50-hour filmmaking competition saw more than 23,600 filmmakers who took part and made 1,220 films over the weekend. The theme announced was 'Top of the World'. The jury for the festival was Madhur Bhandarkar, Nagesh Kukunoor, Sriram Raghavan and southern super director Vetrimaaran. A good number of teams also participated from China, Dubai, US, and 16 more countries.

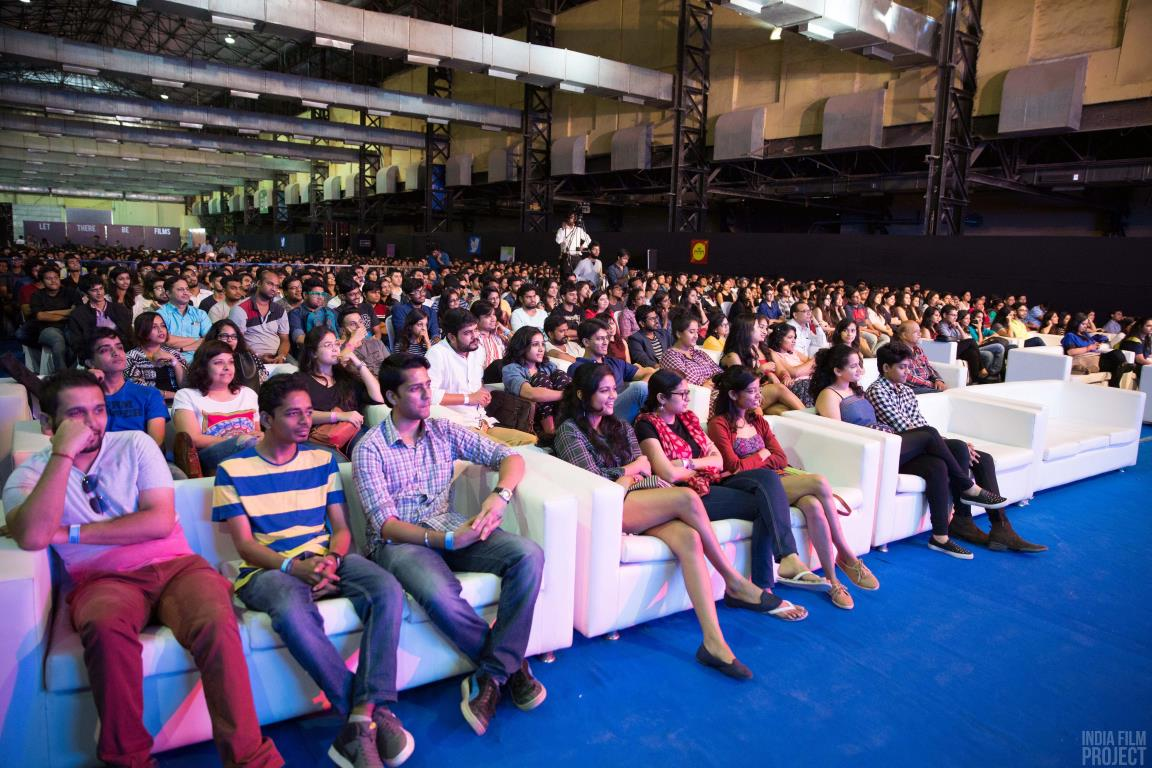
More than 8,000 film enthusiasts at IFP 2016

The grand finale held on 1 October at Mumbai.

Kanan Gill lead a conversation on 'How not to make a film' where he took the audience view of content creation. East India Comedy was represented by Sorabh Pant, Angad Singh and Azeem Banatwala, seen conversing with Raja Sen about importance of giving offence. Nikhil Taneja from Y-Films along with Anupama Chopra, Nidhi Bisht and Sameer Saxena from The Viral Fever conversed about the anatomy of making and distributing a web-series, a rather new form of content for youngsters. Karan Talwar and Anisha Rickshawalli joined Raja Sen in discussing about Split Personality on screen. Apart from conversations, the day also included a workshop on short storytelling and short filmmaking conducted by Terribly Tiny Tales and a screening of popular web films by Pocket Films.

The evening also saw Sumeet Vyas, Nidhi Singh of Permanent Roommates fame, Naveen Kasturia, Maanvi Gagroo and Amol Parashar from The Viral Fever. The event was hosted by RJ Megha, Malishka RJ and Rishi Kapoor. The event was attended by over 8,000 film enthusiasts from around the country.

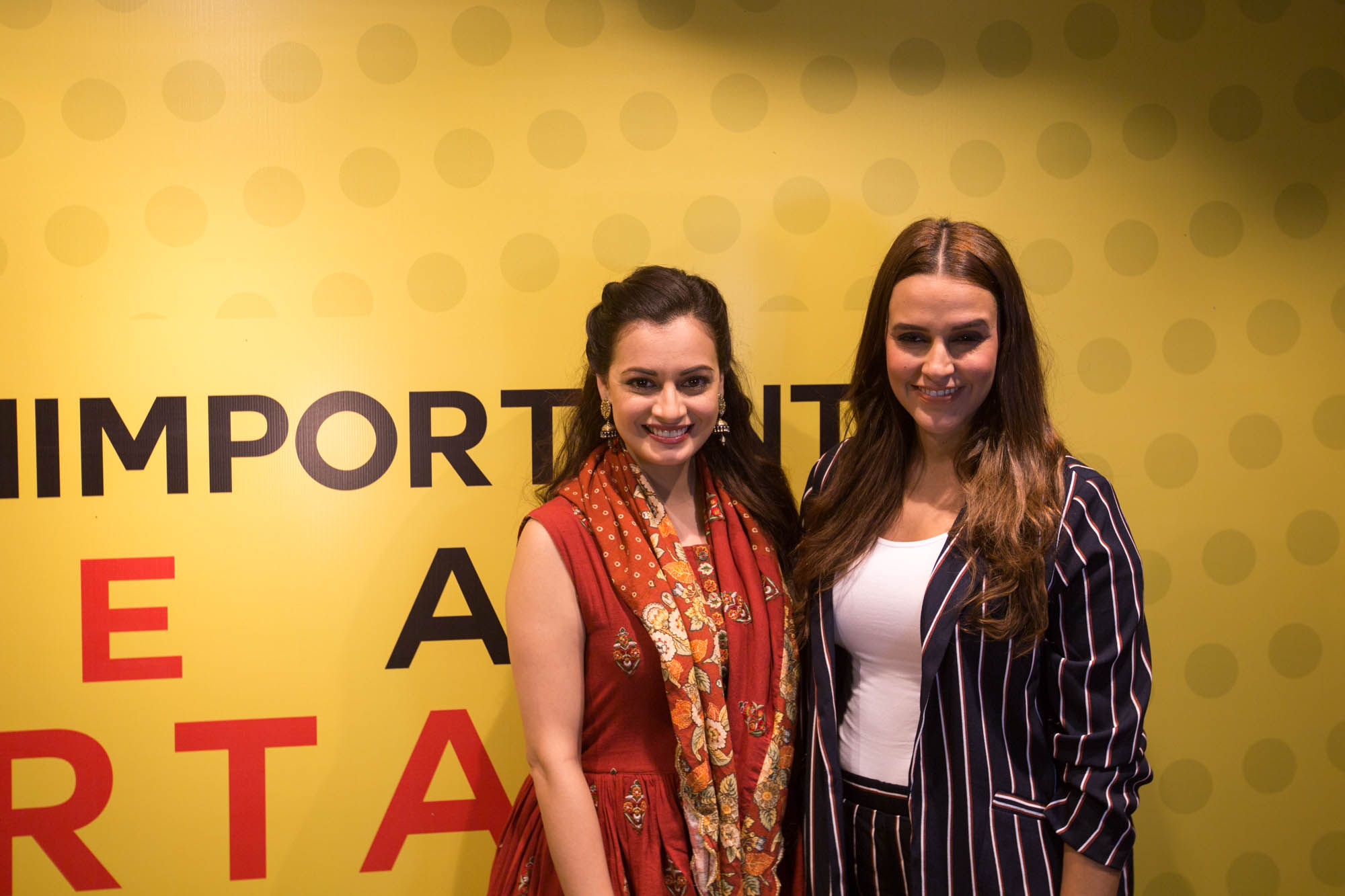
Neha Dhupia and Dia Mirza at IFP Season 7

=== Season 7 ===
The 2017 festival was held at Nehru Center in Mumbai on 30 September and 1 October. More than 29,000 filmmakers from 18 countries participated in the 50-hour challenge, creating over 1,503 films, each of them 4 to 6 minutes, on the theme 'Everything is connected' over a weekend. The jury for the seventh edition of the festival was Ram Madhvani, Aniruddha Roy Chowdhury and Vipul Amrutlal Shah.

The 'Best of Digital' awards for YouTube videos were introduced with 5,512 nominations in 7 categories. Two other challenges added to festival were a Short scriptwriting challenge that was executed in association with Terribly Tiny Tales and a Poster Design challenge in association with The Souled Store.

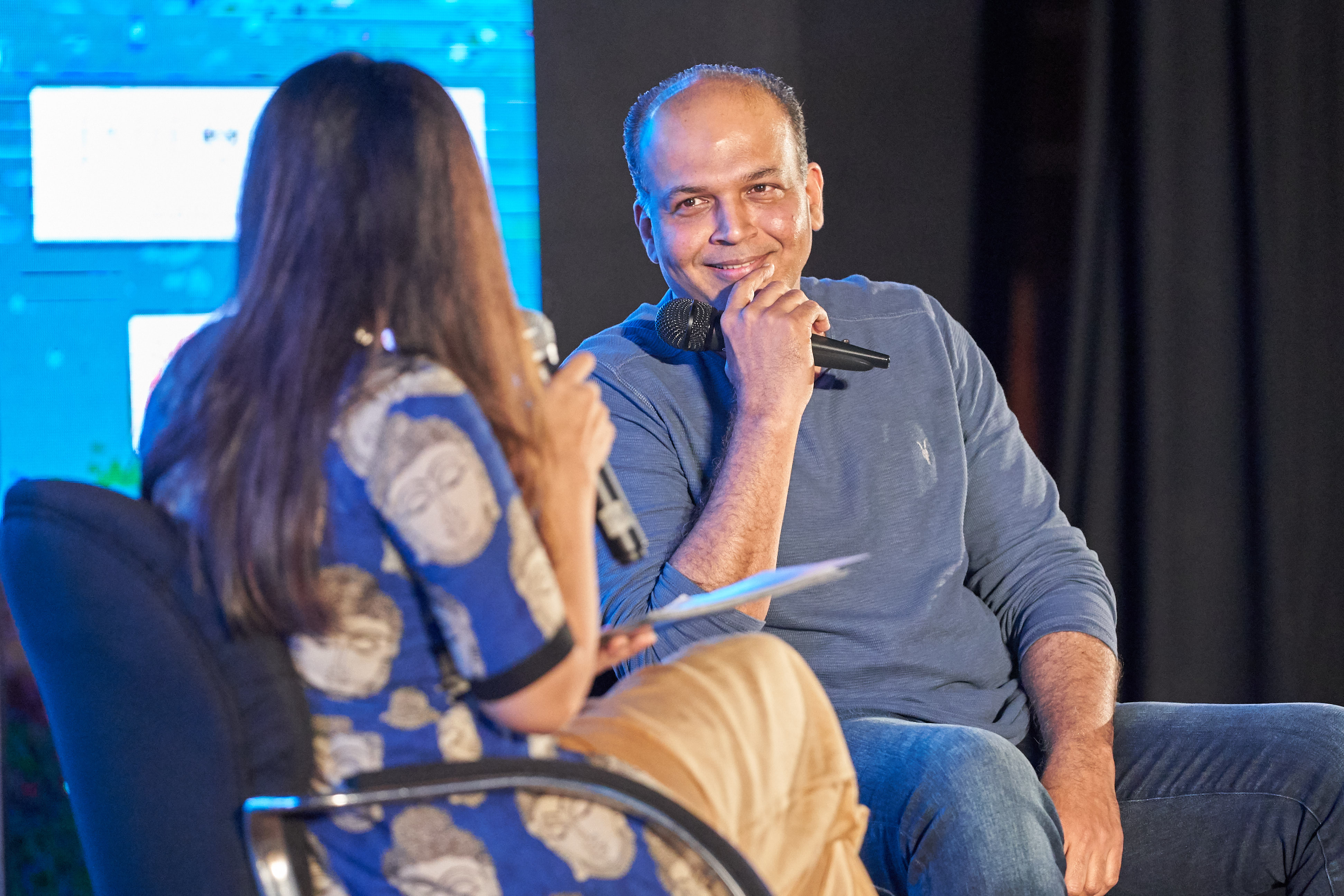
Ashutosh Gowariker in conversation with RJ Megha

The festival had 16,000 visitors attending conversations, workshops and screenings. The Viral Fever's new web-series called Inmates had its premiere at the festival, five days before its official launch.

The festival saw the likes of Ashutosh Gowariker, Devdutt Pattanaik, Nikkhil Advani, Irshad Kamil, Prajakta Koli, Nidhi Bisht, Neha Dhupia, Dia Mirza, Kunal Kapoor, Baradwaj Rangan, Kunal Kohli, Harsh Beniwal, Prahlad Kakkar, Siddharth Mahadevan, Vasan Bala and over 80 other speakers.

Cinthol, Maruti Suzuki, Hotstar, Nokia and Gujarat Tourism were the main sponsors of the event.

=== Season 8 ===
IFP Season 8 saw over 32,000 filmmakers participating and producing 1,550 short films in a duration of 50 hours. The eighth season saw participation from over 300 cities and 30 countries, with teams coming in from USA, UK, Ireland, Australia, Singapore, Dubai, Germany, China, France and more. This was the first time that IFP declared separate theme for each of its categories, namely Professional, Amateur and Mobile. The jury for the 50 Hour Filmmaking Challenge were Sudhir Mishra, Milan Luthria and RS Prasanna.

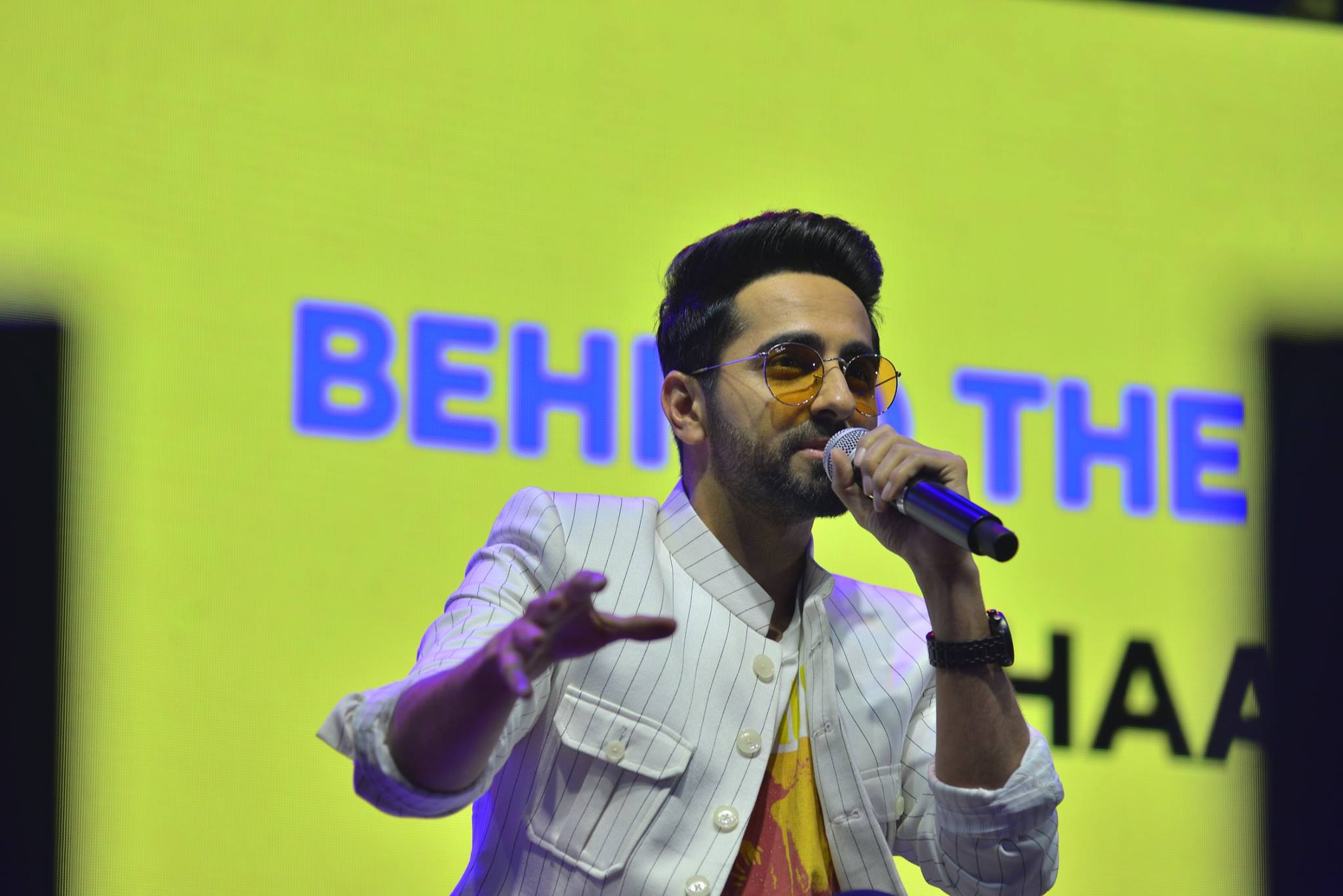
Ayushmann Khurrana at IFP Season 8

The two-day festival in Mumbai was spread across four stages, talking about creation, collaboration and celebration of content. Over 16,000 visitors attended the two-day festival, consisting of engaging conversations, screenings, workshops and Ask me Anythings. The festival saw presence of Alexander Payne, Ayushmann Khurana, Bhumi Pednekar, Kartik Aaryan, Vicky Kaushal, Ashwin Sanghi, Vidya Vox, Shankar Tucker, Bhuvan Bam, Prajakta Koli, Hansal Mehta, Ashwini Iyer Tiwary, Benny Dayal, Kunal Roy Kapoor, Anupama Chopra, Mithila Palkar, Dhruv Sehgal, Rajeev Masand, Vikramaditya Motwane, Bejoy Nambiar, Sona Mohapatra, Mallika Dua, Kaneez Surka, Ashish Chanchlani and over 70 more artists. The Viral Fever's upcoming series Hostel Daze and Dice Media's What the Folks Season 2 were premiered at the festival.

The festival also saw three challenges: Poster Design Challenge for designers, Short Scriptwriting Challenge for writers and Voice Your Words Challenge for Storytellers.

Datsun, Lifebuoy, IMDb, Johnnie Walker and Gujarat Tourism were the main sponsors of the season 8.

=== Season 9 ===
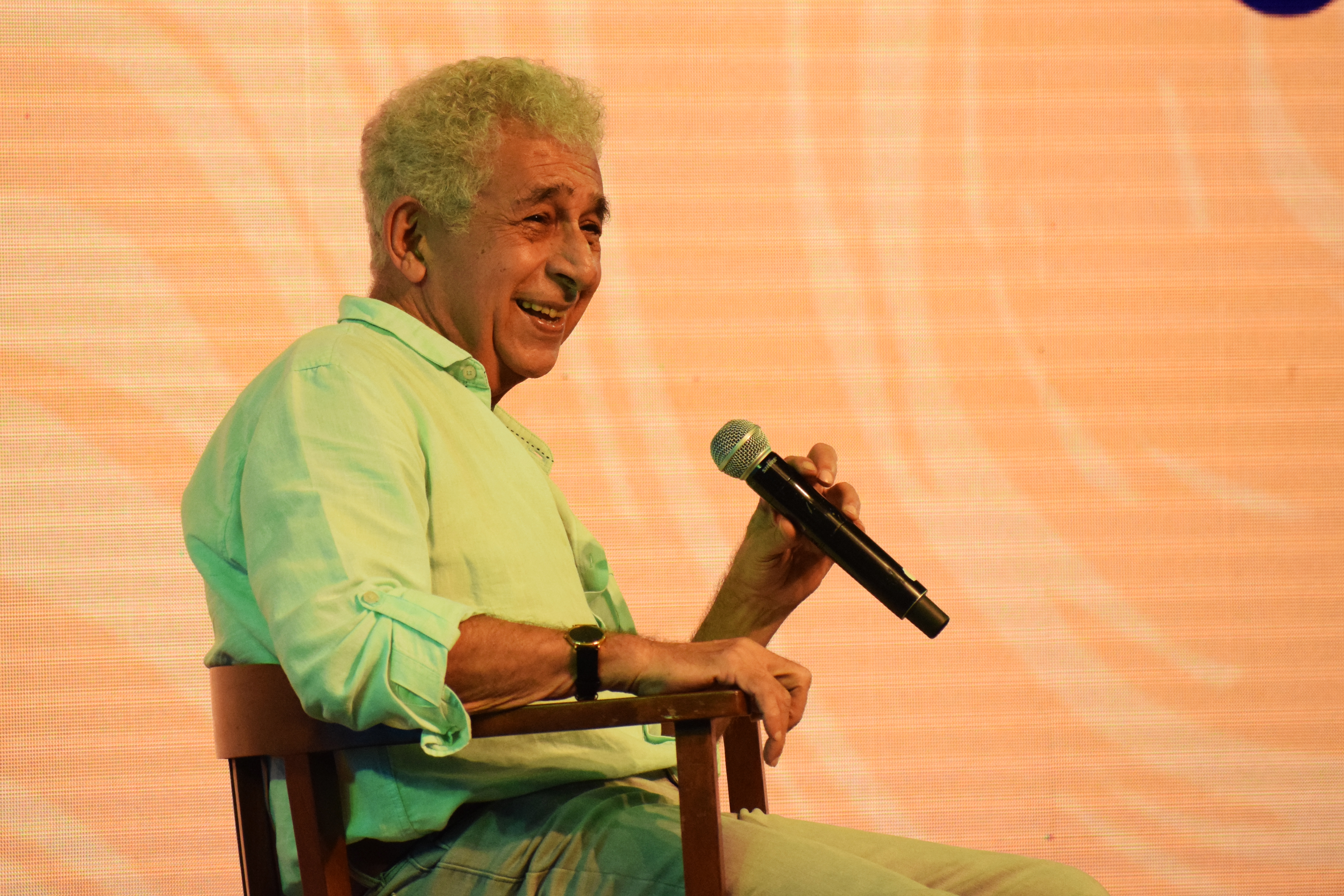
Naseeruddin Shah at IFP Season 9

IFP Season 9, held in September–October timelines, saw over 36,000 filmmakers participating and producing 1,710 short films in a duration of 50 hours. The participation came from 320 cities and 18 countries, with teams from USA, UK, Australia, Turkey, Dubai, Singapore and many more. The jury for the Challenge were Abhishek Chaubey, Anjani Menon, Pan Nalin and Pradeep Sarkar.

The two-day festival was moved to Mehboob Studios at Bandra, Mumbai at a fairly large venue to accommodate the growing community. Over 17,000 creators from 58 cities travelled down to attend the festival, which was spread across 4 stages, with interesting conversations, workshops and screenings. The festival saw presence of Naseeruddin Shah, Javed Akhtar, Manoj Bajpayee, Rajkummar Rao, Divya Dutta, Swara Bhaskar, Ishaan Khatter, Radhika Madan, Jim Sarbh, Devdutt Pattanaik, Vikramaditya Motwane, Prajakta Koli, Zakir Khan, Abish Mathew, Ashish Shakya, Aparshakti Khurrana, Gulshan Devaiah, Anupama Chopra, Anand Gandhi, Kusha Kapila, Jordindian, Be Younick, Beer Biceps, Gaurav Taneja, Kaneez Surka, Gaurav Gera, Ritviz, Naezy Mikey McCleary, Ahsaas Channa, Anand Tiwari, Yahya Bootwala, Amandeep Singh, Kubbra Sait and over 80 more artists. The workshops on post-production, cinematic lighting, pitching, visual effects, use of gimbal, creativity, visual storytelling, self care and many other sessions were introduced to reach out to relevant audiences. The poster of Divya Dutta and Swara Bhaskar's upcoming film Sheer Qorma was launched at the festival amidst much fanfare. Mikhil Musale's upcoming film Made in China starring Rajkumar Rao also launched its teaser at the festival.

The festival also saw participation across Scriptwriting Challenge, Storytelling Challenge and Design Challenge. The winning stories from Storytelling Challenge were later converted in to audiobooks. The winning posters from the Design Challenge are being merchandised and sold to larger audiences across India.

Signature, Myntra, Exide, Adobe, Nikon, DJI, Kingston and Gujarat Tourism were the principal sponsors of the season 9.

=== Season 10 ===
IFP Season 10 saw over 53,000 unique creators participate across challenges and over 27,000 creators attend the 4 day virtual festival. Festival Director Ritam Bhatnagar quoted "Season 10 was nothing short of a miracle. To pull off a festival with over 65,000 unique creators in challenges and virtual festival amidst times when most festivals were getting cancelled has been our feat in itself". The participation came from 343 cities and 23 countries.

The 50 Hour Filmmaking saw approximately 38,000 filmmakers participate and create 1804 short films over a weekend. The festival also introduced a 50 Hour Music Challenge, one of its kind which saw 1,200 original tracks made by 11,000 participating musicians from across 7 countries. The festival saw surge in participation across Scriptwriting, Storytelling and Design Challenge.

The organisers announced a 4-day virtual festival that saw over 27,000 attendees across 3 stages. Some of the people on IFP's stage in 2020 were Nawazuddin Siddiqui, Maiteryi Ramakrishnan, Bhumi Pednekar, Mira Nair, Shabana Azmi, Pankaj Tripathi, Adil Hussain, Kirti Kulhari, Gajraj Rao, Shweta Tripathi, Vikrant Massey, Resul Pookutty, Mumbiker Nikhil, Beyounick, Rasika Dugal, Ratna Pathak Shah, Kabir Akhtar, Karthik Subbaraj, David Jones, Guneet Monga, Madhu Trehan, Kusha Kapila, Mohd. Zeeshan Ayyub, Dolly Singh, Sumeet Vyas, Amol Parashar, Maanvi Gagroo, Jaideep Ahlawat, Jim Sarbh, Pulkit Samrat, Kriti Kharbanda, Priya Malik and over 140 artists on the stage. The festival also saw workshops on cinematography, pre-production, music production, illustrations, doodling, sound design and many more by GoPro, Sennheiser, Spotify, Celtx, XP Pen, etc.

OnePlus, Bumble, Tata Sky, Acer, Fujifilm, MUBI were the main sponsors for the season 10.

=== Season 11 ===
Amidst the covid chaos, the organisers decided to continue season 11 as a virtual festival. The season saw over 65,000 unique creators participate across the 5 creative challenges and over 29,000 creators attend the 4 day virtual festival, held from 21 to 24 October 2021. The festival saw participation from over 417 cities and 31 unique countries, making it one of the most widely spread participation.

Flagship 50 Hour Filmmaking Challenge saw 32,300 filmmakers creating 1,527 short films from 24 to 26 Sep 2021. The 50 Hour Music Challenge in its second edition saw over 11,600 musicians from over 11 countries creating 1,087 tracks across Pop, Hip Hop, Folk Fusion, Electronic and Rock genres.

The 7 Day Storytelling, Writing and Design challenges were further bifurcated to include poetry, short stories, digital illustrations and digital collages respectively.

The 4 day virtual festival diversified to also include conversations about game development, photography, technology, advertising and performing arts. Spread across 4 stages, festival saw some of the culture shaping artists on stage including Taapsee Pannu, Vicky Kaushal, Emraan Hashmi, R Madhavan, Vir Das, Shoojit Sircar, Vikram Motwane, Prateek Kuhad, Ritviz, Bhuvan Bam, Anuja Chauhan, Amish Tripathi, Emma Donoghue, Tom Perrotta, Asif Kapadia, Ranveer Allahbadia, Saloni Gaur, Sayani Gupta, Ankur Tewari, Anuv Jain, Ayush Mehra, Brodha V, Dar Gai, Guneet Monga, Hanif Kureshi, Kausar Munir, Shalmali Kholgade, Swanand Kirkire, Lifafa, MC Altaf, Prateek vats, Seema Pahwa and over 150 others.

The festival was sponsored by Vivo, Signature, DSP Mutual Fund, Fujifilm, Intel, DishTV, Sennheiser, MUBI and Punjab Tourism and saw support from partners like Ableton, Audient, First Draft, FL Studio, Pantone, Filmfare, TVF and many more.

=== Season 12 ===
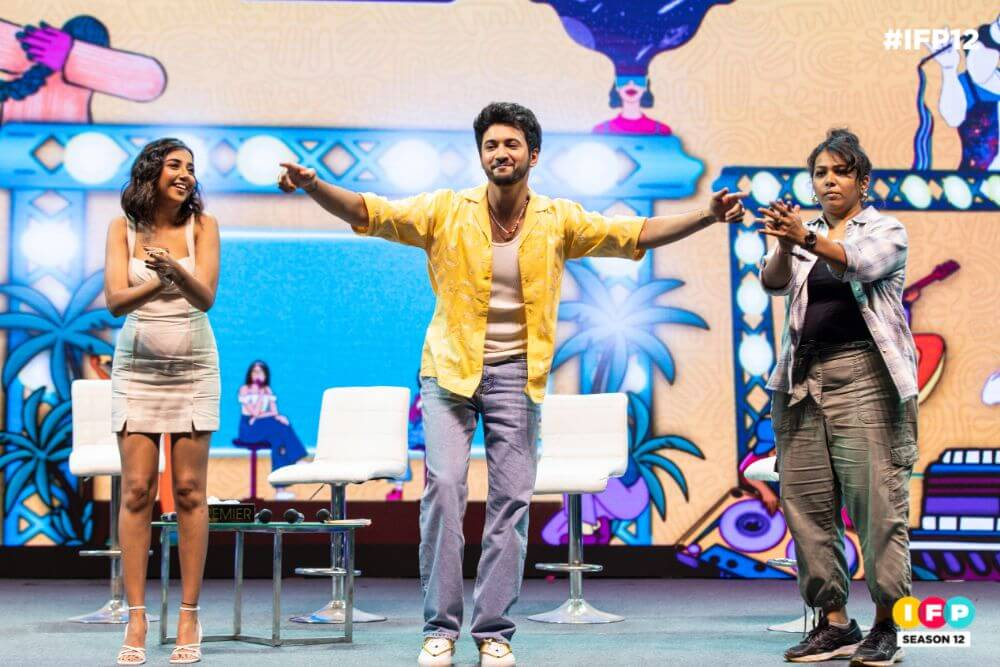
Rohit Saraf & Prajakta Koli at IFP Season 12

The festival came back with its on-ground run after two years virtually. The season saw over 56,500 creators participate across 7 creative challenges, with two additional challenges being introduced - the 50 Hour Photography Challenge and 7 Day Standup Challenge. The 2 day festival was attended by over 13,750 creators at Mumbai, held on October 7 and 8, 2022. The participation came from 378 cities and 39 countries.

The 2 day festival expanded to culture space with inclusion of politics and gaming, and saw people like Tom Schulman, Shashi Tharoor, Javed Akhtar, Vijay Varma, Ashwiny Iyer Tiwari, Rohit Saraf, R Balki, Gauri Shinde, Prajakta Koli, Ankur Warikoo, Dr. Siddharth Warrier, Anand Gandhi, Kabir Khan, Makarand Deshpande, Leeza Mangaldas, Sonam Nair, Yashraj Mukhate, Richie Mehta, Raj Shamani and over 150 others.

The festival was sponsored by Mountain Dew, DSP Mutual Fund, Intel, Boat, QuillBot, Sennheiser, Croma & MP Tourism.

=== Season 13 ===
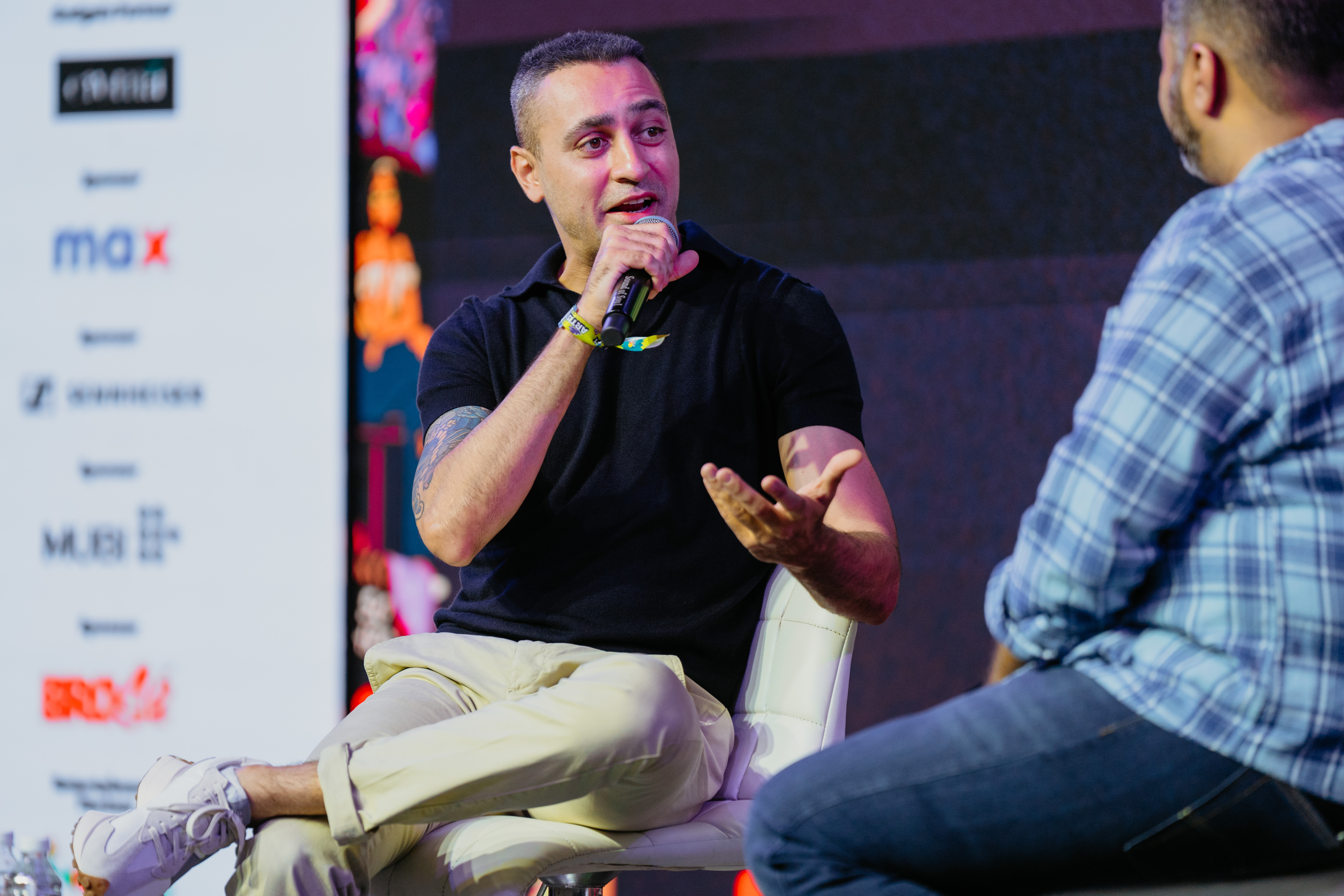
Imran Khan making a public comeback at IFP after almost a decade

The 2023 edition saw over 47,800 creative minds come together to participate in the 50 Hour challenges. The two day festival saw creators like Nawazuddin Siddiqui, Imran Khan, Aditya Roy Kapur, Konkona Sen Sharma, Richa Chadha, Ali Fazal, Vikramaditya Motwane, Kunal Kemmu, Pratik Gandhi, Anna Ben, Vir Das, Rohan Joshi, Raghav Juyal, Nimrat Kaur, Sheeba Chadha, Shefali Shah, Sonakshi Sinha, Arivu, Hanumankind, Prabhdeep, Vishnu Kaushal amongst 172 personalities who climbed the stage.

IFP Season 13 was sponsored by Hero Motocorp, DSP Mutual Fund, Meesho & Sennheiser.

=== Season 14 ===
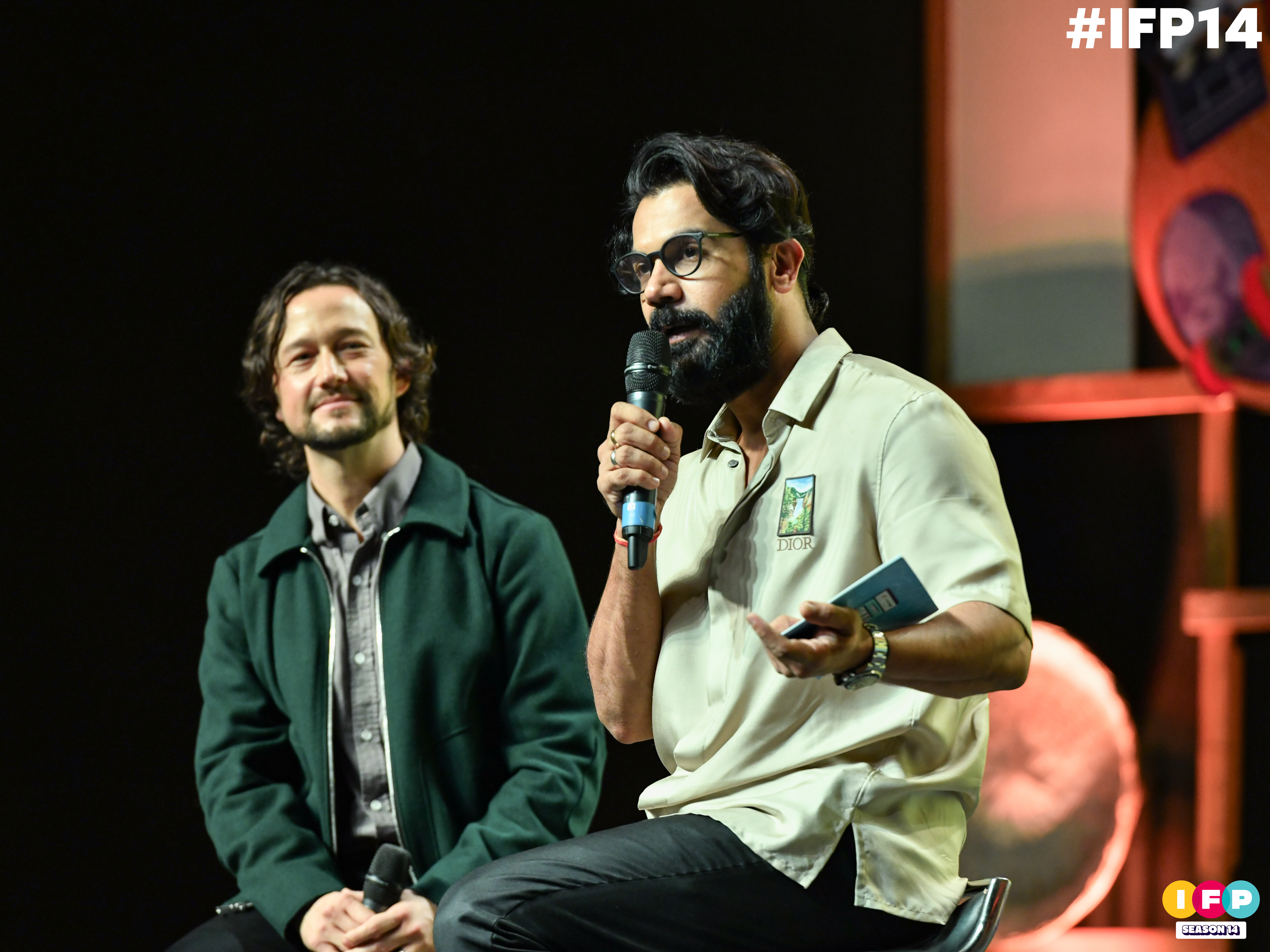
Joseph Gordon Levitt in conversation with Rajkummar Rao

IFP Season 14 introduced new elements, including the Mono Act category under the Performing Arts Challenge and the transformation of its 7-day challenges into 50-hour formats. The two-day festival, held on October 12–13, 2024, in Mumbai, attracted an audience of over 15,310 attendees.

A key highlight of the season was the attendance of renowned Hollywood actor and filmmaker Joseph Gordon-Levitt, who made his first visit to India to participate as a speaker. The event featured sessions from prominent personalities, including Naseeruddin Shah, Vidhu Vinod Chopra, Ram Madhvani, Prasoon Pandey, Taapsee Pannu, Kabir Khan, Shoojit Sircar, Aditi Rao Hydari, Kartik Aaryan, Sharvari, Ranveer Brar, Rob, Devdutt Pattanaik, Vikas Swarup, Chaitanya Tamhane, Mansi Ugale, Mayank Shekhar, Sasha Jairam, Avanti Nagral, and Yashraj, among others.

In collaboration with Intel, IFP achieved a Guinness World Record for "The most number of AI-generated images uploaded to a bespoke website in one hour." The 14th season was supported by major sponsors, including Intel, ITC Bingo, Royal Stag, Jameson, and Sennheiser.

=== Season 15 (2025) ===
In 2025, IFP marked its fifteenth season with its annual 50 Hour Creative Challenges followed by the IFP Festival. The Season 15 festival was held on 29–30 November 2025 at Mehboob Studios, Mumbai, featuring sessions, workshops, discussions and live performances across multiple creative domains under the festival theme of Creativity × Culture.

As part of Season 15, IFP conducted a series of time-bound challenges across categories including filmmaking, music, photography, writing, design and performing arts, scheduled between September and October 2025. The 50 Hour Filmmaking Challenge ran from 10–12 October 2025.

For Season 15, IFP listed AllEvents as its Event Marketing Partner.

== Labs ==
=== Web Writers' Lab ===
In 2018, IFP started an exclusive lab for writers in web domain along with Pocket Aces. The lab saw over 1200 applications and 10 selected writers underwent a seven-day residential program at Mumbai. The lab was mentored by leading writers from Indian web content ecosystem including Dhruv Sehgal.

In 2020, the second season of lab took place in middle of pandemic, receiving more than 2000 applications for a 5-day virtual residency program.

=== Podcast Lab ===
In 2021, IFP partnered with Spotify and Anchor to create India's first lab for podcasters, a 25 week long program to mentor and handhold aspiring podcasters for producing their first season. The lab saw over 1200 applicants and 200 podcasters from 63 cities were selected as a part of first batch after a thorough interview process. The lab included mentors like Anupama Chopra, Varun Duggirala, Mantra, Chhavi Sachdev, Kedar Nimkar, Mayank Shekhar, Joshua Thomas and many more.

== 50 Hour Challenges ==
=== 50 Hour Filmmaking Challenge ===
Started in 2011, 50 Hour Filmmaking Challenge is IFP's flagship challenge that has seen over 1.85 Lakh filmmakers participate in last 11 years. The challenge is one of the largest filmmaking challenge in the world, with participation from all 5 continents. Participants can choose to participate across Professional, Amateur or Mobile category depending on their experience and equipment usage. In 2015, the challenge was made open to films made in all languages. The winning films from the challenge were broadcast on MTV India in IFP's official show called IFP Shorts.

	Theme	Films	Participants	Cities	Countries	Jury
2011	Small things in life	86	620	14	1	Sanjay Gadhvi, Ashish Kakkad
2012	Ingredients of good living	121	1,510	22	1	Shoojit Sircar, Vikramaditya Motwane, Komal Nahta, Rajesh Mapuskar
2013	India can change	322	4,270	44	3	Tigmanshu Dhulia, Nikhil Advani, Bejoy Nambiar
2014	Progress has many meanings	619	10,600	122	11	Shyam Benegal, Hansal Mehta, Omung Kumar, Umesh Shukla
2015	There is a twist in the end	700+	14,400	184	18	Ketan Mehta, Onir, Raja Sen, Guneet Monga
2016	Top of the world	1,220	23,600	242	20	Madhur Bhandarkar, Sriram Raghavan, Nagesh Kukunoor, Vetrimaaran
2017	Everything is connected	1,503	29,000	262	18	Ram Madhvani, Aniruddha Roy Chowdhury, Vipul Amrutlal Shah
2018	Professional Category - A story of Change Amateur Category - Experience Change Mobile Category - Precaution is better than Cure	1,550	32,000	300	30	Sudhir Mishra, Milan Luthria, RS Prasanna
2019	Professional Category - A Tale of Passion Amateur Category - Your Reason to Road Mobile Category - What's Stopping You?	1,710	36,000	320	18	Abhishek Chaubey, Anjali Menon, Pan Nalin, Pradeep Sarkar
2020	Professional Category - Brave New World Amateur Category - Almost Famous Mobile Category - Stop at Nothing	1,804	38,000	334	22	Ashwiny Iyer Tiwari, Raj Nidimoru and Krishna DK, Subhashish Bhutiani
2021	Professional Category - You are more than your Name Amateur Category - How Money makes you Feel Mobile Category - Language of Joy	1,527	32,300	347	18	Navdeep Singh, Leena Yadav, Shakun Batra
2022	Professional Category - No Fear is Small Amateur Category - The Best Advice Mobile Category - No Fear is Small	1,715	34,100	341	21	Alankrita Shrivastava, Jeo Baby, Rima Das, Selvaraghavan
2023	Professional Category - Invest for Good Amateur Category - We are our choices Mobile Category - There is always a Plan-B	1,325	25,478	386	25	Anvitaa Dutt, Gautham V Menon, Habib Faisal, Nandini Reddy, Rahul Dholakia
2024	Professional Category - Feel like a Queen Amateur Category - A Happy Discovery Mobile Vertical Category - Building Something Together Mobile Horizontal Category - The Missing Piece in the Puzzle	1,418	31,267	367	31	Amit Sharma, Devashish Makhija, Kabir Khan, Lijo Jose Pellisery, Sooni Taraporevala

=== 50 Hour Music Challenge ===
Added in 2020, the concept according to organisers was derived from already existing rule of creating original music in the 50 Hour Filmmaking Challenge. The challenge has 5 genres that participants can choose from, namely Pop, Rock, Hip Hip, Folk Fusion and Electronic. The musicians are required to create original piece of music in just 50 hours on a given theme, which is later judged by pre-jury and jury.

Year	Theme	Tracks	Participants	Cities	Countries	Jury
2020	A song about growing up and how things change	1208	11,341	204	7	Dualist Inquiry, Lisa Mishra, Naezy, Raman Negi, Vasu Dixit
2021	Write a Song about little things in life that make you happy	1087	11,622	252	11	Ashwin Gopakumar, Brodha V, Lifafa, Nirali Kartik, Nitin Malik
2022	Dreams that keep you awake	1,212	10,104	215	12	OAFF, Raja Kumari, Rajan Batra, Shalmali Kholgade, Sneha Khanwalkar
2023	Create an Anthem of a city you love	1,018	11,238	289	10	Amit Kilam, KaamBhari, Rashmeet Kaur, SickFlip, Swanand Kirkire
2024	A song about giving in to your desire at the moment without worrying about any consequences	1,058	10,131	307	13	Arivu, Darbuka Siva, Shor Police, Sushin Shyam, Tech Panda & Kenzani

=== 50 Hour Design Challenge ===
Running since 2017, the challenge was initially launched as a poster design challenge, inviting designers to recreate movie posters on a given theme within 7 days. In 2020, an additional category of Fan Art was added to the challenge. Owing to huge participation in 2020 and continuous demand for adding even more categories, Digital Illustrations and Digital Collage were additionally added in 2021. In 2022, a UI/UX category was also added on popular demand, and 'Brand book' category in 2023.

In 2024, the challenge was re-packaged to 50 Hour Design Challenge and a new category called 'AI Art' was added.

Year	Theme	Participants	Jury
2017	Minimal Poster	628	Raj Khatri
2018	Minimal Poster	871	Raj Khatri
2019	Contemporary Modern Day poster for Old Films made between 1970 and 1999	1286	Raj Khatri
2020	Fan Art - Rebel (Choose a respectful and recognizable or fictional Rebellious figure) Poster Art - Crossover Poster between any two movies, two shows, two books or two music album.	1871	Aaron Pinto, Raj Khatri, Vimal Chandran
2021	Poster and Cover Art - Incorporate a relevant Brand in Movie Poster / Book Cover / Music Album Art Fan Art - What if your favourite Creators/Public figure/Sportsman had a Different Job/Profession Digital Illustration - Alternate History Digital Collage - What’s your Idea of India	1928	Mehek Malhotra, Santanu Hazarika
2022	Poster & Cover Art - Create a spin-off movie/series/book poster of your favorite side character. Give it a title and a tagline Fan Art - Time Travel - Re-imagine your favourite creators, artists, sports personalities, politicians and scientists from history in today's time. Digital Illustration - Imagine a New year party in 3000s Digital Doodle - Doodle the spirit of your town, village or city UI/UX - A Recipe App	1816	Mounica Tata, Prasad Bhat, Saptarshi Prakash, Srishti Gupta Roy
2023	Poster and Cover Art - Convert a movie poster into a book cover or music album art. Fan Art - Re-create any iconic pop-culture moment in the last decade of your favourite public figure Digital Illustration - Re-create your Happy Place with you in it Brand Book - Create a brand for your favourite Creators Clothing line UI/UX - A disaster management app that helps you cope up with any ongoing disaster, based on your location it prepares you and gives you a checklist to do if you get stuck in a disaster.	2278	D. Udaya Kumar, Gopi Prasannaa, Jayesh Joshi, Jayesh Sachdev, Rahul Saini
2024	Poster and Cover Art - A Poster out of Any News of 2024 - If a Movie was Made on it Fan Art - A Portrait of a Famous Personality using Typography Digital Illustration - Celebrating 'Love for Indian Cinema Brand Book - A Brand Book for a Device that Translates what Animals are Saying into Human Language UI Design - Elderly Care Support App AI Art - Exploring the world inside a Child’s Dreams Doodle - Moments of Friendship	2481	Chaaya Prabhat, Maanvi Kapur, Munz TDT, Rob, Sabari Venu, Shreeya Malpani, Varun Gupta

=== 50 Hour Writing Challenge ===
Introduced in 2017, the challenge has been participated by over 11,000 writers in last 6 years. Initially, the challenge saw only short scriptwriting as an accepted format. However, owing to challenge's popularity amongst writers across the world, a short story category was later added in 2021 and Think Piece category in 2022.

In 2024, the challenge was re-packaged to 50 Hour Writing Challenge and a new category called 'Mini Series' was added.

Year	Theme	Participants	Jury
2017	Over the Edge	971	NA
2018	Modern Day Love	1219	NA
2019	Old School Love in time of Technology	1483	Apurva Asrani, Bhavani Iyer, Saiwyn Quadras
2020	Whatever it takes	1961	Atika Chohan, Hitesh Kewalya, Niren Bhatt
2021	Ticket to Anywhere	1578	Gazal Dhaliwal, Hardik Mehta, Mahesh Narayanan
2022	Scriptwriting - From the Antagonist’s perspective Short Story - Hero with a Thousand Faces Think Piece - Conflict	1891	Anuja Chauhan, Aleesha Matharu, Janice Pariat, Kanika Dhillon
2023	Scriptwriting - White Lies Short Story - There Is Always A Way Think Piece - Conspiracy Theory	2041	Advaita Kala, Madhu Trehan, Tanushree Podder
2024	Short Story - Moment of Clarity Short Script - I woke up in a fictional world Think Piece - Is Originality Dead? Mini Series - The Sun Rose in the West	2112	Abbas Tyrewala, Anand Neelakantan, Hemanth Rao, Ira Mukhoty, Sandeep Modi, Urmi Juvekar, Yashica Dutt

=== 50 Hour Performing Arts Challenge ===
Previously known as 7 Day Storytelling challenge, it was brought to light in 2018 with spoken word as its only category. In 2021, poetry was added since organisers felt both were active form of performing arts expressions. In last 5 years, over 7,100 performers have participated actively from over 19 countries with major participation coming in English and Hindi languages.

In 2024, the challenge was re-packaged to 50 Hour Performing Arts Challenge and a new category called 'Mono Acting' was added.

Year	Theme	Participants	Jury
2018	A short film called my life	628	NA
2019	Not So Superhero	867	Jidnya Sujata, Yahya Bootwala, Amandeep Singh
2020	What's your Utopia	1038	Hussain Haidry, Priya Malik
2021	They Say I'm Different	1103	Akhil Katyal, Aranya Johar
2022	That Moment	1141	Arundhati Subramaniam, Mehak Mirza Prabhu, Nidhi Narwal
2023	Spoken Word - What If? Why Not? Poetry - Trip to the Moon	1011	Azhar Iqbal, Rakesh Tiwari, Swastika Rajput, Sonnet Monda
2024	Spoken Word - I Built My Own World Poetry - The universe that Looks Upon Me Mono Act - A Birthday Wish For Someone Who Is No More	818	Dolly Thakore, Lillete Dubey, Manoj Shah, Puneet Sharma, Simar Singh

=== 50 Hour Photography Challenge ===
This challenge was introduced in 2022, to enable photographers to participate in a time-bound manner. The debut challenge year saw over 1,000+ participating photographers from 4 countries.

In 2024, the challenge format was changed to one new theme every ten hours

Year	Theme	Participants	Jury
2022	Old Everything	1118	Arjun Mark, Avani Rai, Radhakrishnan Chakyat
2023	Joy of Missing Out	1219	Harpreet Bachher, Tarun Chouhan
2024	Prompt 1 - Million dollar reaction Prompt 2: Humans are Machines Prompt 3: Fashion on the streets Prompt 4: Life at 3 AM Prompt 5: Odd one out	1184	Sasha Jairam, Subrata Biswas

=== 7 Day Standup Challenge ===
Seeing the national standup scene grown exponentially, and yet lack of platforms for comics that could catapult them nationally, the challenge was introduced as a community voted initiative. The debut challenge year saw over 800 comics from 14 year olds to 62 years olds, participate.

This challenge was dis-continued from 2024.

Year	Theme	Participants	Jury
2022	Modern problems require modern solutions	816	Aditi Mittal, Neeti Palta
2023	Unpopular Opinion	717	Appurv Gupta, Raunaq Rajani

== See also ==
- All India Bakchod
- East India Comedy
- The Viral Fever
