= G. R. Iranna =

Indian contemporary artist (born 1970)

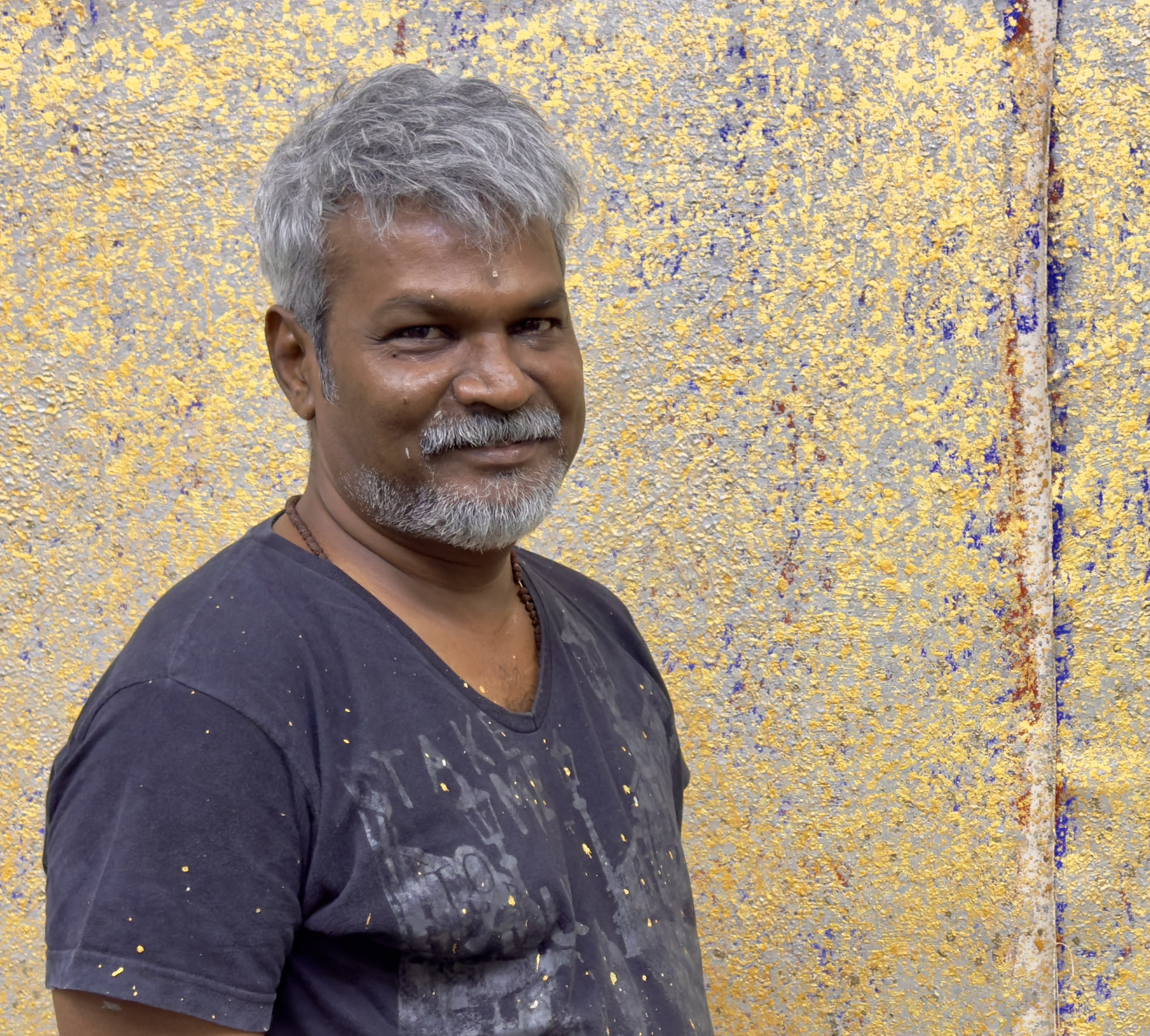
- G. R. Iranna
- Born: 1970 (age 55–56); Sindagi, Karnataka, India
- Education: College of Visual Art, Kalaburagi; College of Art, Delhi
- Known for: Painting, sculpture, installation art

G. R. Iranna (born 1970) is an Indian contemporary artist working in painting, sculpture and installation art. His work has addressed themes including social conflict, memory, violence, mortality and impermanence, and he has used materials including ash and found objects in his practice.

In 2016, the National Gallery of Modern Art, Bengaluru, presented a retrospective of his work, And the Last Shall Be the First: G. R. Iranna, Works 1995–2015. In 2019, he was one of the artists represented in the India Pavilion at the 58th Venice Biennale.

== Background and career ==
Iranna was born in 1970 in Sindagi, Karnataka, and spent part of his childhood in a gurukul. He later studied at the College of Visual Art in Kalaburagi and completed postgraduate studies at the College of Art, Delhi.

Iranna initially worked primarily as a painter and later expanded his practice to sculpture and installation. In a 2007 interview with The Times of India, he described a shift from work based largely on personal memories and experiences towards broader social concerns, including the effects of violence and conflict on ordinary people.

Ash became a recurring material in Iranna's work. His 2017 solo exhibition Ether Is All That Is at Gallery Espace, New Delhi, included paintings and installations using ash to examine ideas of mortality, fragility and the transitory nature of life. The exhibition was also covered by Artforum.

The same period included Garbh, a large ash-based installation shown at the Kochi-Muziris Biennale. The Indian Express described the work as combining the form of an egg, suggesting the beginning of life, with ash, representing its end.

In 2016, Iranna's retrospective at the National Gallery of Modern Art, Bengaluru, brought together paintings, sculptures and installations from approximately two decades of his practice. The exhibition was curated by Ranjit Hoskote.

For the India Pavilion at the 2019 Venice Biennale, Iranna presented Naavu, an installation made from hundreds of wooden padukas associated with the history of the Dandi March. The work addressed collective action and the individuals who participated in the movement alongside Mahatma Gandhi.

In 2021, his exhibition Budi (Ash) at Gallery Espace continued his use of ash, trees and natural forms as metaphors for mortality and historical memory.

Iranna received the National Academy Award from the Lalit Kala Akademi in 1997.

== Publications ==
Iranna's work is the subject of The Dancer on the Horse: Reflections on the Art of Iranna GR by art critic and curator Ranjit Hoskote, published by Mapin Publishing in 2007.
