= Amba Sanyal =

Indian actor

- Born: 1945 (age 80–81); Delhi, British Raj
- Occupations: Theater artist, costume designer
- Parents: B. C. Sanyal (father); Snehalata Sanyal (mother)

Amba Sanyal (born 1945) is an Indian theater artist and costume designer. She is a recipient of the Sangeet Natak Akademi Award in 2008 for Costume design.

== Early life and education ==
She was born in Delhi as the daughter of B. C. Sanyal, noted painter, sculptor and Art teacher and Snehalata Sanyal, danseuse and actress. She studied at the Delhi College of Art (University of Delhi), Shantiniketan (Visva-Bharati University), Ecole des Beaux Arts at Paris.

== Career ==
She has acted in dramas by Habib Tanvir, Ebrahim Alkazi, Amal Allana and Sheila Bhatia. She has designed costumes for many National School of Drama productions including Romeo and Juliet in Technicolour directed by Roysten Abel. In 2013, she appeared in National Film Award-winning Ship of Theseus directed by Anand Gandhi. In 2016, she appeared in Kahaani 2 directed by Sujoy Ghosh.

== Personal life ==
Her husband K.T. Ravindran, is a noted architect and dean of School of Planning and Architecture, Delhi.

== Works ==
- A series on Saris of India (Three books about Saris of Madhya Pradesh, West Bengal, and Bihar)

== Awards ==
- 2008 Sangeet Natak Akademi Award, given by the Sangeet Natak Akademi, India's National Academy of Music, Dance & Drama.
