= Anupam Sud =

Artist

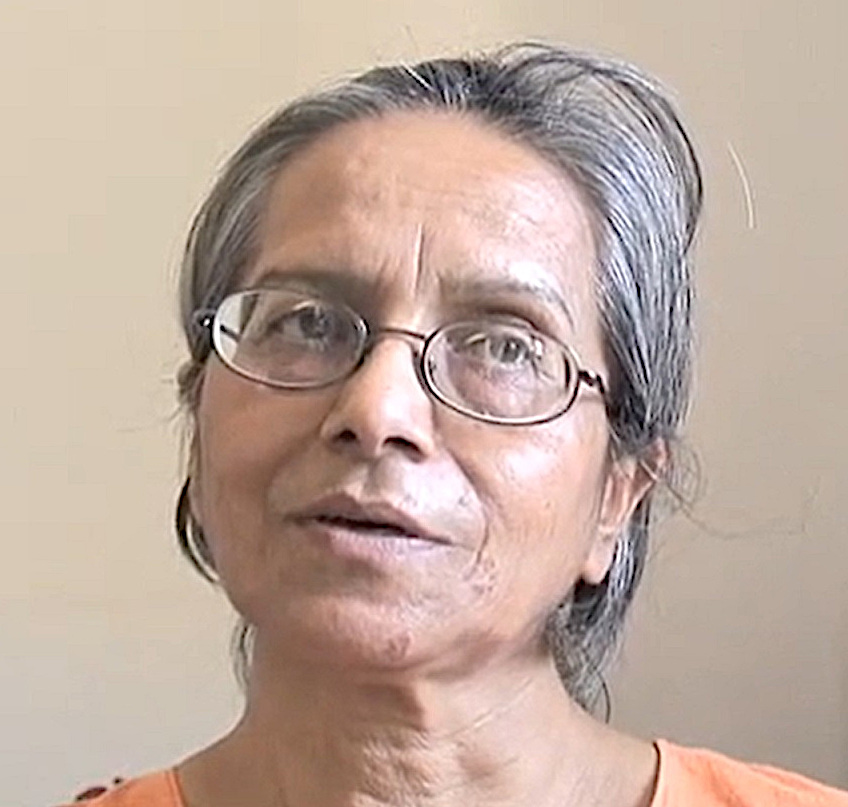
- Sud in 2012
- Born: Anupam Sud; 1944; Hoshiarpur, Punjab, India
- Known for: artist, printmaker,

Anupam Sud (born 1944) is an artist who lives and works in Mandi, a small community on the outskirts of New Delhi. She was born in Punjab, though she spent much of her youth in the former British summer capital of Simla in Himachal Pradesh. Coming from a conservative family, her choice of an academic career and artistic pursuits over an arranged marriage was both brave and rare.

== Biography ==
Sud studied at the College of Art, Delhi from 1962 to 1967, during the same decade that Somnath Hore was retooling and revitalizing the college's printmaking department. Anupam was the youngest member of "Group 8", an association of artists at the college that was founded by Anupam's teacher Jagmohan Chopra, and was dedicated to furthering an awareness of printmaking in India.

Sud later studied printmaking at the Slade School of Fine Art, University College, London, from 1971 through 1972. It was after her return from Slade that Anupam Sud developed an intense interest in exploring clothed and unclothed human figures through the medium of etching. Anupam found inspiration in both male and female sexuality and identities. Overt takes on social issues are seldom found in Sud's art, and her figures are often self-absorbed and brooding. However, through symbolism and metaphor Sud engages with socially relevant themes, and moody depictions of interrelations between the sexes are a favorite topic in her work. Sud's etchings are made with the use of zinc plates, a difficult medium that requires both patience and precision.

One of Sud's best known bodies of work, the "Dialogue Series", expresses human communication between people of various sexes through a mood of mature, silent, acceptance. The "Dialogue Series" emphasizes human togetherness as intimate and non-verbal. In one of the works from the same series, a couple of seated in front of a dilapidated house, separated by barbed wire. There does not appear to be much intimacy between them. Set amongst crumbling stone facades, the people are embodiments of changing values.

Sud's work is in the collections of The National Gallery of Modern Art, New Delhi, The Victoria and Albert Museum, London, The Peabody Museum, U.S.A., and the Glenbarra Art Museum, Japan.

== Influences ==
Anupam has often acknowledged her father's love for bodybuilding, Punjabi theatre, detective stories, her mother's appreciation for classical music and reading of the Upanishads as her major influences. She developed her skills as an artist under the mentorship of Somnath Hore in Delhi.

== Awards ==
She has won numerous national and international Awards from Lalit Kala Academy, President's Gold Medal, Kala Ratna, Sahitya Kala Parishad, Egyptian International Print Biennale, B. C. Sanyal award and more.
