= M.A.D. (Indian TV programme) =

- Genre: Arts & craft Music; Children; Education
- Country of origin: India
- Original language: Hindi
- No. of series: 7
- No. of episodes: 70

Production
- Running time: 30 minutes
- Production company: Miditech

Original release
- Network: Pogo TV
- Release: 2005 – 2010

M.A.D., which stands for "music, art, and dance", is an Indian educational children's television series. It was produced by Miditech, and aired on Pogo TV. It began in 2005 and ran for seven seasons. It is a Do it yourself show. The main host and director of the show is Rob (Harun Robert). He shows how to make different easy and difficult but cool art. He is also followed by some co-anchors in every season. The series came to an end in 2010. After the success of the show, Rob started a YouTube Channel "Mad Stuff with Rob" based on the show.

== Cast ==
Along with Rob, who is the artist and main host, some other co-anchors were introduced in different seasons to perform dance and play music.

=== Season 1 ===
- Rob - He is the main anchor who makes art in 'Make It Easy' and two other unnamed sections. He also makes The Big Picture.
- Candy - She is the main female host in the first season. She tells facts and sometimes performs a dance in In Motion.
- Palak and Abhas - They both are child anchors, who learn arts from Rob in the second art section and then try them and show them to Rob at the end of the show. They also tell facts and perform a dance in 'In Motion'.

=== Season 2 ===
- Rob
- Palak and Abhas
- Deepti - She is the main female anchor in season 2. She does the same as that of Candy in season 1.
- Sid - He is a guitarist and the main member of the band shown in the season. He only plays music in 'In Stereo' section and sometimes tells thoughts.

=== Season 3 ===
- Rob
- Sid
- Chinu (Shilarna Vaze) - She is the main female anchor of season 3, which contains the most number of episodes of all the seasons. She does all the works of Candy, Deepti, Palak, and Abhas.

=== Seasons 4 and 5 ===
- Rob
- Rumana - She is the main female anchor of the last two seasons of the show. She tells facts and is an extremely good dancer. Her original talent can only be seen in 'In Motion'.

== Format ==
The show does not have the simple format that of other art and craft shows, as it not only let kids learn multiple arts but also shows them cool dance, melodious music, and interesting facts, and let them meet some talented people. Each episode of every season except Season 5 is based on a theme and all of the dance, music, and art are shown in that episode are related to that theme. It also helps children to learn about that theme. The themes are mainly water, space, camera, light, etc. In every episode, three art are shown made in two unnamed sections and in the section 'Make It Easy'. 'The Big Picture' and one of 'In Motion', 'In Stereo', 'In Action' (mostly 'In Motion') are also necessarily shown in every episode. The total sections are following-

- Make It Easy- In this section, easy-to-make artworks are taught to children. Some guest children also visit Rob in these sections and learn from him and sometimes even make that artwork with him.

Note: It ran for every season.

- Unnamed Art Section- In this section Rob shows some DIY that are neither too tough nor too easy.

Note: Palak and Abhas used to learn these arts from Rob and then make them themselves and show it to Rob. This section was removed from the last season of the show.

- Unnamed Art Section (2)- In this section, Rob shows a bit more complicated DIY. He is not accompanied by anyone in this section.

Note: This section was also removed from the last season.

- The Big Picture- In this section, Rob along with a team makes an incredible and extreme art, which is mostly a big 3D craft made outside the sets of the show or in some outside location.

Note: It ran for every season.

- In Motion- In this section, either the female anchor or kids and other anchors perform a dance based on the theme of the episode.

Note: It ran for every season but not in every episode.

- In Stereo- In this section, either Sid or the band or any guest musician plays a piece of melodious music related to the theme of the episode.

Note: It was removed from the last two seasons.

- In Action- In this section, Rob performs some different actions like flying a kite in the International Kite Festival- Uttarayan of Gujarat.

Note: It is shown very few times and in only season 2. Note: Mainly anyone of the above three sections was included in a single episode.

- Studio - In this section, a guest is introduced, who is well accomplished in some activity related to the theme. Sometimes Rob learns a few things from the guest.

Some of the main guests are Himanshu Agrawal, an origami artist, Ashley Lobo, an Indian Choreographer), etc.

- Gallery - At the end of almost every episode, Rob visits the gallery where he reads fanmail and artworks sent by the viewers. Also in each of the episodes except seasons 1 and 2, the gallery wall appears full of drawings during the ending credits.
- Facts- In the first two seasons, a different section was shown for the main anchors to tell facts. However, in other seasons facts were told without any particular section.
- Animate - In this section, some animations are either funny or informative.

Note: It was introduced in season 4 and ran for two seasons.

Sections only introduced in Season 5: Season 5 was a completely different season from others as it wasn't based on any theme.

- Draw It Now! - In this section, Rob shows some cool drawings which can be made in five simple steps including- making a rough shape, completing the sketch, making an outline using a marker, erasing the pencil outline, colouring it.
- Challenge Rob! - In this section, Rumana gives Rob a challenge to make some cool art for her using only the things that she has provided.
- Small Picture - Similar to that of 'The Big Picture', a small picture is made in this section. Some examples of the small picture are buildings made up of staple pins and an island made from vegetables.

== Home media ==
Excel Video released VCD and DVD sets of the complete series in November 2009.
