= Rameshwar Broota =

Indian artist (born 1941)

- Born: 1941 (age 84–85); Delhi, British India
- Education: College of Art, Delhi
- Occupation: Artist
- Spouse(s): Shobha Broota (separated); Vasundhara Tewari Broota
- Children: 2

Rameshwar Broota (born 1941, New Delhi) is an Indian visual artist. His work revolves around sustained exploration of the body and its vulnerabilities. He is known for his unique Scratch technique.

== Early life ==
Broota was born in 1941 in Delhi an art-oriented family. He graduated in fine arts from the Delhi College of Art in 1964. His parents were singers and his brothers were visual artists.

=== Personal life ===
Rameshwar Broota was married to Shobha Broota, an artist, and they have two daughters Pooja and Sakshi. His daughter Pooja Iranna is also a visual artist. After separating from Shobha, he married Vasundhara Tewari Broota, who is also an artist.

== Exhibitions ==
- Man Series, Digital Exhibition, September 2020
- Scripted in Time, Vadehra Art Gallery, February 2018
- Visions of Integrity: Interrogating the male body, Kiran Nadar Museum of Art, January 2015
- Scripted in Time II, February 2019

== Collections ==
- Kiran Nadar Museum of Art
- Museum Kunstpalast
- National Gallery of Modern Art

== Awards and recognition ==
- Ranked second in Hurun India Art List 2020.
