= Shobha Broota =

Indian artist (born 1943)

- Born: 22 January 1943 (age 83); Delhi, British India
- Education: College of Art, Delhi
- Occupations: Artist, art teacher
- Years active: 1964–present
- Spouse: Rameshwar Broota (separated)
- Children: 2

Shobha Broota is an Indian artist from Delhi. She received the award from All India Fine Arts and Crafts Society, award from the Sahitya Kala Parishad, Art Educationist Award from New Delhi Municipal Council and scholarship and fellowship from the Ministry of Culture, Government of India.

== Biography ==
Shobha Broota was born on January 22, 1943, into an artistic family in Delhi. At the age of 5, she started learning Indian classical music and at the age of 19 she completed Sangeet Visharad degree in Hindustani classical vocals. She is also a sitarist.

Later she completed Diploma in Fine Arts from College of Art, Delhi in 1964.

=== Personal life ===
Shobha was married to Rameshwar Broota, and they have two daughters Pooja and Sakshi. Her former husband Rameshwar Broota and her daughter Pooja Iranna are also artists.

== Artistic career and exhibitions ==
Shobha Broota started her artistic career by drawing portraits and figurative works, moved to wood etchings in In the 1970s-80s, and later to minimalistic abstract oil & acrylic paintings. She has incorporated hand-woven fabric and threads into her abstract works to form patterns.

Shobha Broota done her first solo exhibition in Delhi in 1965. Her 2021 exhibition Sutra at Bikaner House was a major showcase of her significant works created over four decades. An exhibition in Delhi Art Gallery in 2025, titled Painting Infinity displayed nearly 100 works of her including portraits, abstracts, etchings, woven canvases and ink impressions.

In addition to more than 21 solo exhibitions in various venues across India, Shobha Broota has also done solo exhibitions at SCHOO Gallery in Amsterdam, Rebecca Hossack Gallery in London, Edith Cowan University, Perth, Australia and Aicon Gallery, Palo Alto, California, USA. She was also been invited by the Guyanese government to paint the portrait of the former president Cheddi Jagan.

== Contributions ==
Shobha Broota has co-authored a book titled Vesture of Being with art critic, writer and Poet Keshav Malik.

After completing her diploma in fine arts from the College of Art, Delhi, in 1964, she was appointed as a teacher in the art department there. She later worked as an art educator at Triveni Kala Sangam, New Delhi.

== Awards and honors ==
Shobha Broota received many awards, including the award from All India Fine Arts and Crafts Society, award from the Sahitya Kala Parishad, Art Educationist Award from New Delhi Municipal Council (NDMC) and scholarship and fellowship from the Ministry of Culture, Government of India.
