= B. C. Sanyal =

Indian artist (1902 – 2003)

- Born: 22 April 1902; Dibrugarh, Assam, British Raj
- Died: 9 January 2003 (aged 101); New Delhi, India
- Other name: Bhabesh Chandra Sanyal
- Education: Government College of Art & Craft, Kolkata
- Occupations: Painter, sculptor and art teacher
- Known for: Sculptures and paintings
- Children: Amba Sanyal

Bhabesh Chandra Sanyal commonly known as B. C. Sanyal (22 April 1902 – 9 August 2003), the doyen of modernism in Indian art, was an Indian painter and sculptor and an art teacher to three generations of artists. During his lifetime he not just saw the partition of the Indian subcontinent three times, 1905, 1947 and 1971, but also witnessed 20th century Indian art in all its phases. His notable paintings include The flying scarecrow, Cow herd, Despair and Way to peace, which depicts Mahatma Gandhi with a Hindu and a Muslim child.

He was awarded the Padma Bhushan in 1984, and India's highest award in visual arts, the Lalit Kala Akademi Fellowship for lifetime achievement by Lalit Kala Akademi, India's National Academy of Fine Arts in 1980.

== Early life and education ==
Born in 1902 in Dibrugarh in a Bengali Family, he witnessed the Partition of Bengal in 1905, while still a child. Though tragedy struck early, when he lost his father at six-year, and was brought up by his mother, who had penchant for making dolls, which shaped the sculptor in him.

He later studied at Government College of Art & Craft (GCAC), Calcutta, where he was a student of teachers like Percy Brown and J.P. Ganguly.

== Career ==
In 1920, he joined the Serampore College of Art, where he spent the following six years practising and teaching painting and sculpture. During this period he has neither subscribed to the Bengal school nor sided with the Victorian academism, but evolved his own individualistic style, which got him noticed

The turning point in his career however came in 1929, when he was commissioned by Punjabi firm, Krishna Plaster Works to go to Lahore to make a bust of recently martyred leader, Lala Lajpat Rai, ahead of Lahore Session of Indian National Congress. He stayed back as other commissions followed, and soon became vice-principal of the Mayo School of Arts, Lahore (now known as National College of Arts), which was earlier started by Lockwood Kipling (father of author Rudyard Kipling). Here two of his students Satish Gujral and Krishen Khanna went on to become prominent modernists of the post-independence period. He remained at Mayo till 1936, when he was forced to resign as the British Raj viewed him as a "trouble-maker".

Subsequently, he set up the Lahore College of Art in 1937, a studio-cum-school, initially at the premises of the Forman Christian College, at the invitation of its first Indian principal, Dr. S.K. Dutta. The school was later formally inaugurated in a basement at the Dayal Singh Mansions, with an exhibition of prominent artists from Lahore, of the period. He continued to freelanced and taught here, till 1947.

After the partition of India, Sanyal and his wife Snelata, a ghazal singer and theatre person, moved to Delhi, where he stayed for the rest of his life. Here he set up base in the 26, Gole Market. This "refugee studio" soon became a hub for artists and students in Delhi, and later gallery 26. Soon it gave rise to the Delhi Shilpi Chakra (Delhi Sculptor Circle), which he founded along with a number of artist-friends (Dinkar Kowshik, K.S Kulkarni, Jaya Appasamy, Shankar Pillai, Kanwal Krishna, P.N Mago, etc.) had an important influence on the contemporary art in the North India. He showed at the Salon de Mai, Paris in 1949, and also participated in the Venice Biennale (1953); in the same year he joined as Professor and Head of the Department of Art, Delhi Polytechnic, Kashmiri Gate, (1953–1960), now upgraded to the College of Art.

He also remained part of the All India Fine Arts and Crafts Society (AIFACS), and secretary of the Lalit Kala Akademi (LKA), India's National Academy of the Arts (1960–69) and later served as its vice-chairman. It was during his tenure at the LKA, strong foundation for the national body was laid and it also held its first triennial, now a permanent fixture.

As an artist working with watercolours and oil paintings, his themes revolved around archetypal human struggles, deeply focussed on the economically deprived. A number of his works are now part of the collection of National Gallery of Modern Art, New Delhi. His sculpture, The Veiled Figure, broke new grounds in sculpture as he portrayed the memory of his mother.

He also acted in a film Dance of the Wind (1997). He set up a cottage at Andretta, at foothills of Dhauladhar range in Himachal Pradesh, where he came close to Norah Richards. Till late in his age he remained engaged in setting up the Andretta artists' resort and Nora Centre for the Arts at Andretta, near Palampur in Kangra Valley, Himachal Pradesh., and to collect funds for his project, he continued to exhibit and sell his works. He remained active till the end, and at 101 ventured into lithograph with considerable success at Atlier print shop in Delhi.

The Government of India, issued a special postage stamp to commemorate his birth centenary in 2000, while IGNCA, New Delhi in part of its celebrations, of his 100th birthday held a function on 22 April 2001, where an exhibition of tributes by over 170 artistes in various media was opened and a DVD on him along with Elizabeth Brunner, in Great Masters series was released

He died on 9 January 2003, in Nizamuddin East, New Delhi, after a brief illness at the age of 102, he was survived by his wife Snehlata and daughter Amba Sanyal, costume designer, while her husband KT Ravindran, is a noted architect and dean of Delhi's School of Planning and Architecture. Amba Sanyal later received the 2008 Sangeet Natak Akademi Award for Costume Designing (theatre).

== Selected artworks ==
Some of Sanyal's notable paintings and sculptures include:

- The Despair
- Vertical Woman (Sculpture)
- The Flying Scarecrow

== Awards and recognition ==
He was awarded the Lalit Kala Akademi Fellowship for lifetime achievement by Lalit Kala Akademi, India's National Academy of Fine Arts in 1980, Padma Bhushan award in 1984 by Government of India, the honorary citizenship of Baltimore, USA in 1989, Visva Bharati University's Gagan Abani Puraskar in 1993 and the Government of Assam's Sankar Dev award in 1999.

== Legacy ==
The B.C Sanyal Award has been instituted by the Delhi College of Art, New Delhi and confers awards on artists for their contribution to the field. Recipients of this award include:

- Anupam Sud
- Gogi Saroj Pal
- Seema Kohli
- Vasundhara Tewari Broota

== Bibliography ==
- The Vertical Woman: Reminiscences of B.C. Sanyal. National Gallery of Modern Art, 1998.
