= Gopi Gajwani =

Painter, photographer, designer and cartoonist from India

Gopi Gajwani (born 1938 in Sind, India) is a painter, photographer, designer, and cartoonist from New Delhi, India. He graduated from the Delhi School of Art in 1959 with a degree in Graphic Designing.

== Career ==
Gajwani did his graduation in arts from Delhi College of Arts. He was a designer at the American Centre for twenty-nine years, creating posters for plays, films, dances, and workshops, both home-grown and foreign. He contributed cartoons and caricatures to the magazine Span and other publications, besides working as an illustrator. Gajwani designed several coffee table books, some with his own photographs. He also worked as a filmmaker, making experimental short films from 1973 to 2014. His short films, including Time (1973) and The End (1974) were shown in Lalit Kala Akademi's Art in Cinema programme

As a painter, Gajwani had numerous one-man shows at the Shridharani Art Gallery in New Delhi. He also participated in over a hundred group shows in New Delhi and Mumbai, as well as countries outside India.
