= Seema Kohli =

Indian contemporary artist

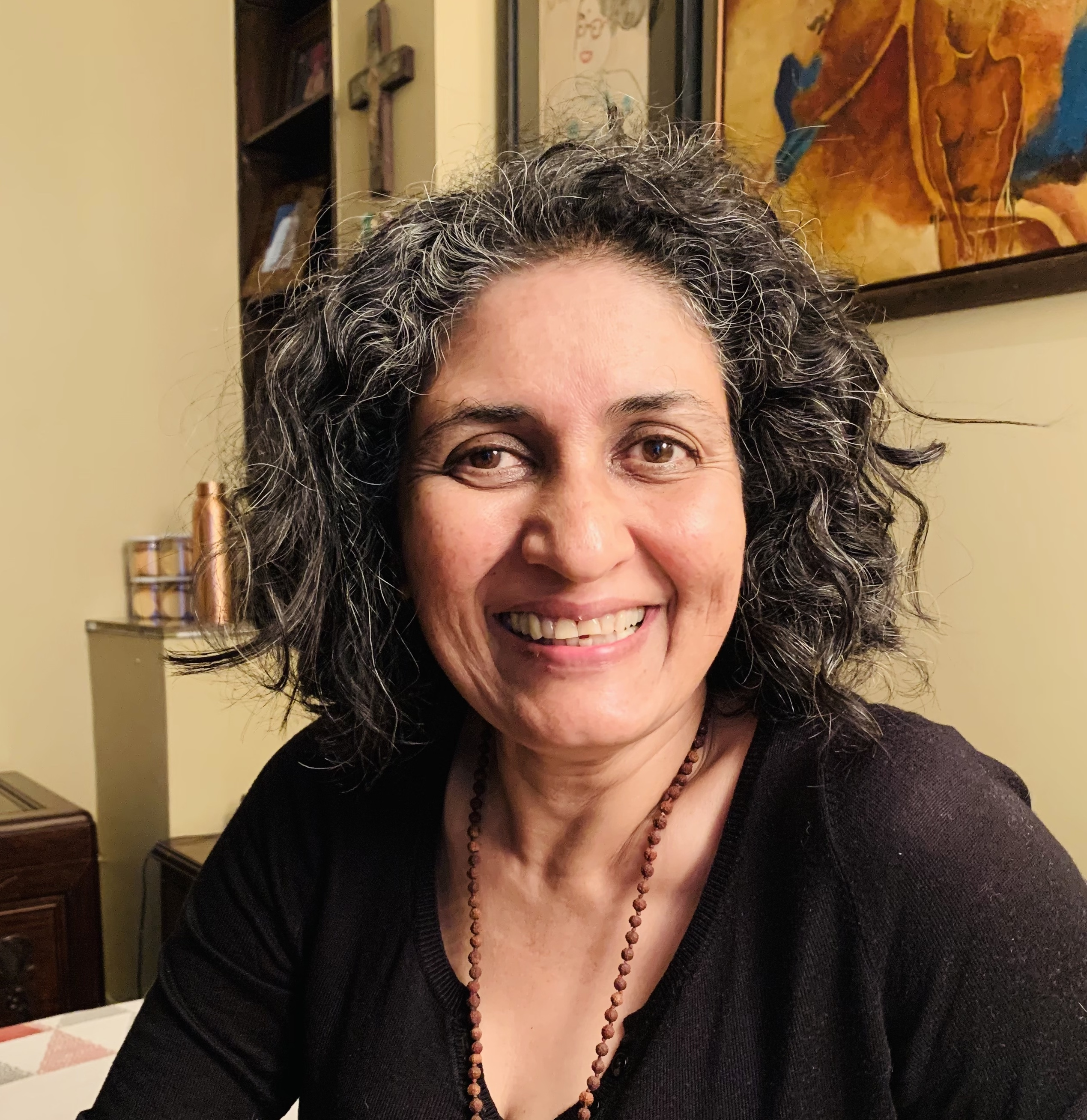
- Born: Delhi, India
- Education: Miranda House, Delhi University South Delhi Polytechnic|South Delhi Polytechnic, Delhi University
- Parents: Krishnan Dev Kohli (father); Uma Kohli (mother)
- Website: www.seemakohli.com

Seema Kohli is a multidisciplinary artist working through the imagination of mythical and fantastical worlds from an eco-feminist eye. Engaging with visual and performative media, Kohli explores the themes of beauty and sensuality echoed in philosophy and spirituality studies across civilisations. Her work primarily celebrates the cosmic feminine and its relationship to forces of creation and destruction. There is a focused engagement with the concept of Hiranayagarbha or The Golden Womb; she attempts to create new artistic identities by reshaping belongings, bringing the past and the present into a dialogue through a process of decay, hybridisation and transformation.

== Early life and career ==
Seema Kohli was born in 1960 in Delhi, India. She graduated from Miranda House, University of Delhi.

Kohli received a gold medal at the Florence Biennale in 2009 for her film Swayamsiddha – Myth, Mind, and Movement.

In 2016, she created a large-scale installation at the Kala Ghoda Arts Festival using 1,000 coloured cutting chai glasses and 700 glass holders.

In 2019, the Museum of Sacred Art (MOSA) hosted a six-month exhibition of Kohli's works at Radhadesh in Durbuy, Belgium.

Her exhibition Cut From The Same Cloth was showcased at Bikaner House, New Delhi, from 28 July to 4 August 2023. The exhibition was presented by Gallerie NVYA.

== Selected exhibitions ==
Her work has been shown at the Kochi-Muziris Biennale, Florence Biennale, Birth Rights Collective, Venice Biennale of Art, National Gallery of Modern Art, Arco, Art Basel, Jaipur Literature Festival, Jehangir Art Gallery, and India Art Fair, as well as the Habiart Foundation.

- "Samsara and Metamorphosis: The Mythical World of Seema Kohli", a solo show at the Pacific Art League, USA
- "Bodies of Sky, Bodies of Earth", a solo show at Shridharani Gallery, Triveni Kala Sangam, 2026
- "With Her Hair Running Wild", a solo show at Gallerie Nvya at Triveni, Triveni Kala Sangam, 2026
- "Where Earth Writes Upon the Sky", a solo show at Lalit Kala Akademi, Chennai, 2025
- "Kaal Netra- Sacred Matrices: Seema Kohli's Living Mythic Matrices", a solo show at the National Gallery of Modern Art, Bengaluru, 2025
- 'Khula Aasman', a solo show at Partition Museum and Seema Kohli Studio, Delhi, 2025.
- 'When the Moon is Nine Months Full', a solo show at Tao Art Gallery, Mumbai, 2024.
- 'Between Realms and Dreams- Along Reality's Edge', a solo show at Bihar Museum, Patna, Bihar, 2024
- 'I tell you: Suns Exist', Archer Art Gallery, Ahmedabad, Gujarat 2023
- "World Within World", Hong Kong Visual Arts Centre, Hong Kong 2023
- "Cut From The Same Cloth", a solo show at Bikaner House, New Delhi 2023
- Jaipur Literature Festival 2023
- Tat Tvam Asi, a solo exhibition at Cromwell Place Galleries, London by SA Fine Art, 2022
- The Feminine in the Divine, a solo exhibition at South Asian Art Gallery, Boston, 2021
- Hiranyagarbha series shown in Yatra Nariyasathu, a group show at the NGMA, Delhi, curated by Uma Nair, 2021
- A Tapestry of Time, a group show at the Tao Art Gallery, Mumbai, 2020

== Bibliography ==
Kohli's artist book, A Storm in My Teacup, was shown at ART HERITAGE at IAF and is now in the collection of Kiran Nadar Museum of Art.

== Awards and recognition ==
Year	Award	Ref.
2017	B. C. Sanyal Award	
2014	Female Empowerment Outstanding Achievement Award by Molecule Communication, Mumbai	
2007	Lalit Kala Akademi National Award for Women	
