= Vasundhara Tewari Broota =

Indian painter (born 1955)

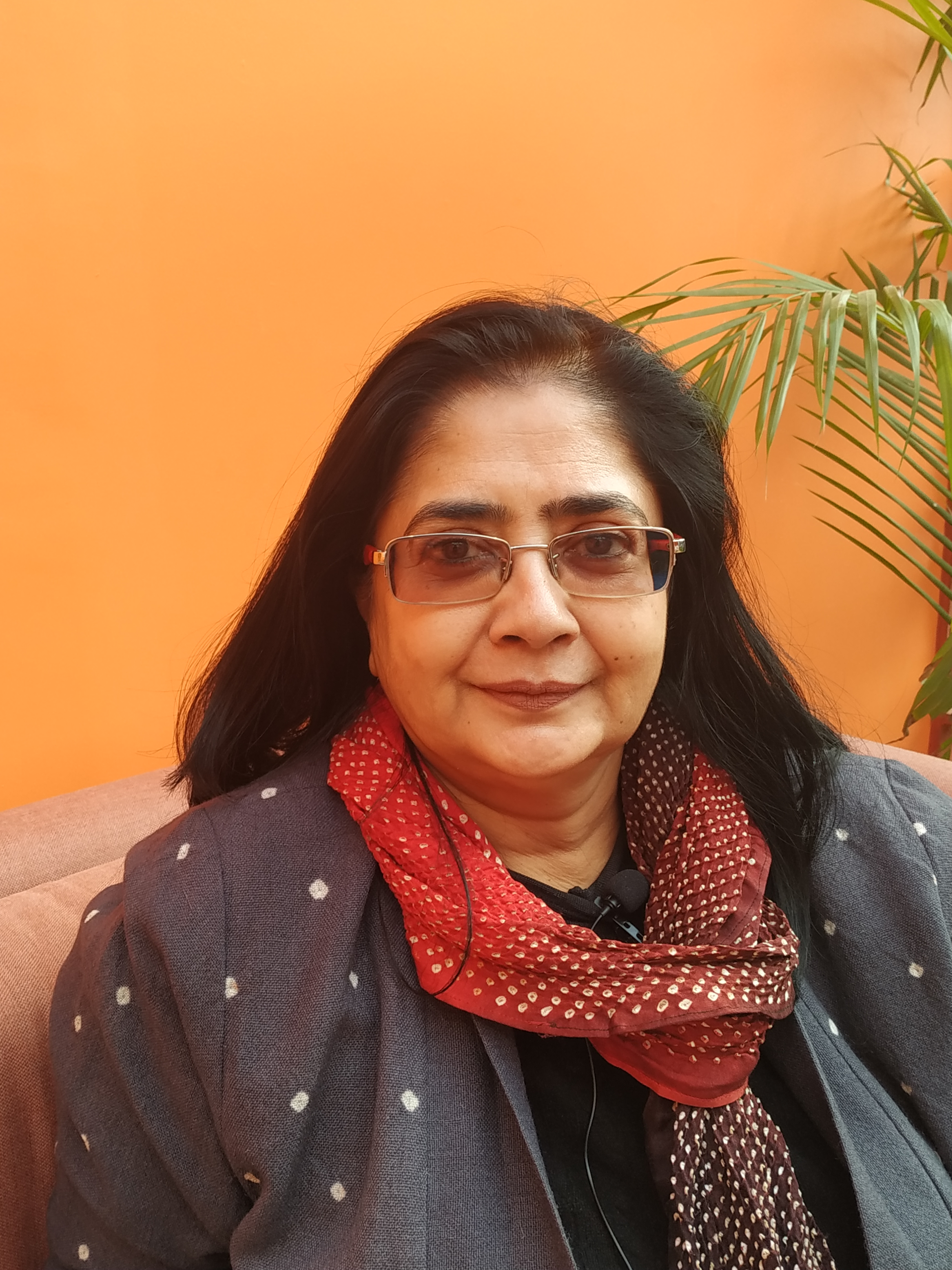
- Vasundhara Tewari Broota
- Born: 1955 (age 70–71)
- Known for: Visual Art

Vasundhara Tewari Broota (born 1955) is an Indian painter who does figurative paintings based on the perception of a woman and the psycho-political existence of the female body, traditional landscapes, still life with exquisite meaning. She worked on a cultural scholarship awarded by the Department of Culture, Government of India during 1982-84. She, Jatin Das and other 298 artists had donated art work for 2018 Kerala floods through an exhibition cum sale held in The National Gallery of Modern Art.

== Early life ==
Tewari was born in Kolkata in 1955 and moved to New Delhi when she was fifteen. She graduated in literature from the University of Delhi and studied art at Triveni Kala Sangam, New Delhi. At Triveni Kala Sangam, she trained under painter and artist Rameshwar Broota who is also her husband.

== Exhibitions and work ==
- First solo show in Shridharani Gallery, Delhi, 1980.
- Group exhibition with other 20 artists organized by Raza foundation in memory of painter S. H. Raza and to celebrate his 97th birth anniversary, February 2019
- Individual Palettes, Group Exhibition, March 2019
- Woman Speak/Child Song, January 2007

== Awards ==
Tewari has won multiple awards including a silver medal at 1st International Biennale Algiers, Sanskriti Award, annual awards at All India Fine Arts and Crafts society, Sahitya Kala Parishad and B. C. Sanyal award.

== Reception ==
Navneet Mendiratta at Business Standard remarked about her work, "Tewari is one of the few artists who likes to explore the potential of figurative painting, particularly the psycho-political existence of the female body. What makes her work stand out is the inherent feminism that translates into women empowerment."

== Personal life ==
Tewari married Indian painter Rameshwar Broota in 1995 and lives and works in New Delhi.
