= Vimal Chandran =

Indian visual artist

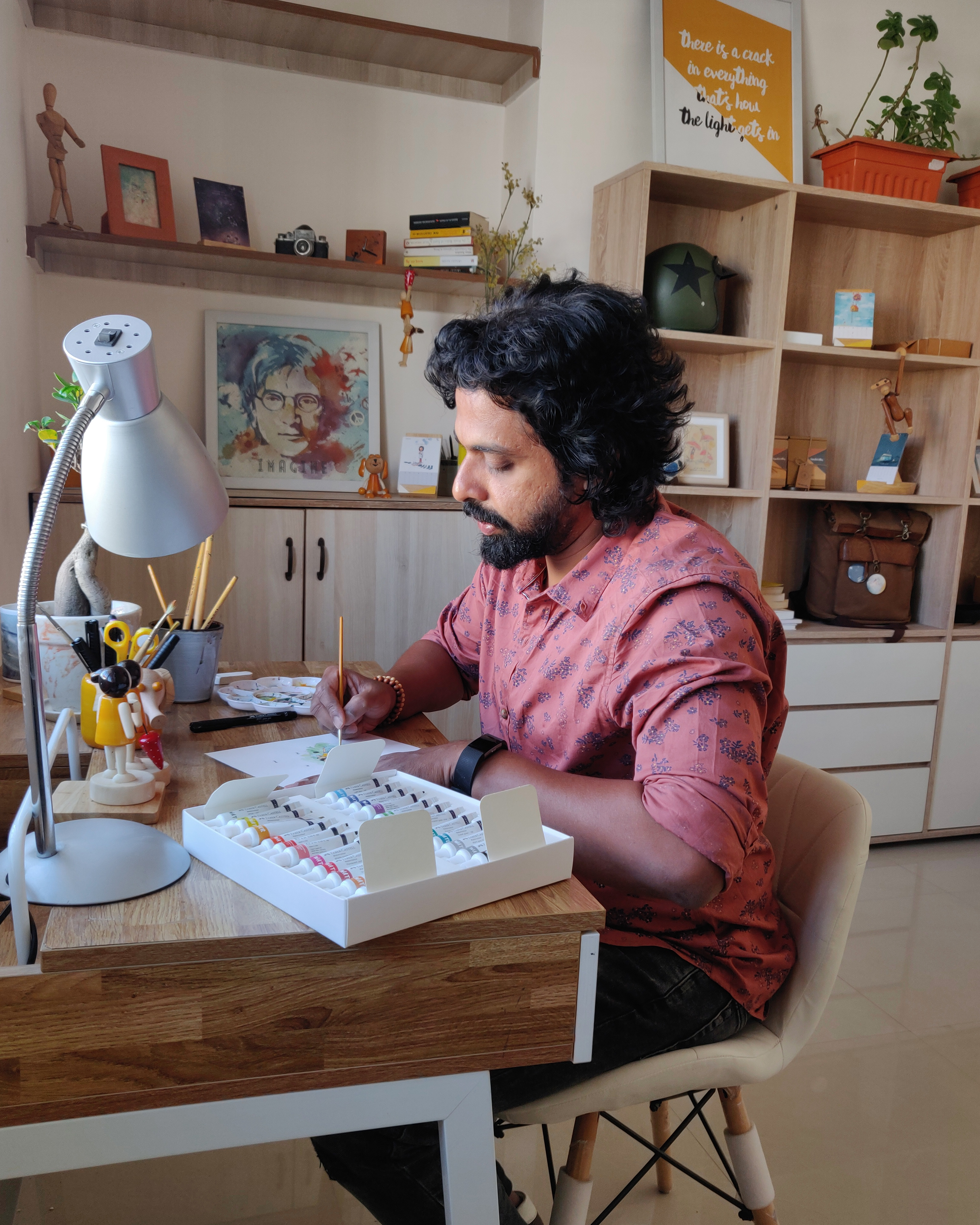
- Born: Palakkad, India
- Known for: Photography, Illustrations, films

Vimal Chandran is an Indian visual artist who works with illustration, photography and films.

== Early life and career ==
Vimal grew up in the town called Palakkad in Kerala. He started painting at the age of four. Vimal completed his B. Tech from Kerala and is a self taught artist. Vimal came to Bangalore to work as a software engineer and eventually quit his corporate job to do art full time. He started exploring digital art from 2008 and his works often reflect vibrant culture of his native place, showing the amalgamation of folklore and myths with science fiction.

== Exhibitions and works ==
- I have seen the labyrinth and it looks like a straight line, solo exhibition at Thalam, Domlur.
- Escape Velocity, solo exhibition at Durbar Hall, Kochi.
- To Italy for Italy, an art and photography project with Lamborghini India
- Unposted Letters , a digital illustration series'
- Folk Sci-Fi, An Indo-futurism digital art series where Indian folklores are reinterpreted in a science fiction environment.

His other works include Monsoon Records, a Photography, art and film project based on the monsoon life of Kerala in collaboration with Avial Band and his work for Port Muziris, Marriott.
