= Harun Robert =

Indian artist and TV personality

- Born: 28 December 1978 (age 47); Delhi, India
- Education: College of Art, Delhi; National Institute of Design, Ahmedabad
- Occupations: Artist; TV personality; YouTuber

Harun Robert (born 28 December 1978), known professionally as Rob, is an Indian professional artist, YouTuber, and TV personality. He was the host and creative director of popular Do it yourself (DIY) TV show M.A.D., which aired on Pogo.

He is currently active on YouTube and Instagram with his channel Mad Stuff With Rob and "artguyrob" respectively and also on Disney India's new show Imagine That. He used to outcast his talent in terms of creative do-it-yourself ideas to make the young children build an imaginative career.

== Career ==
Rob is a trained animation filmmaker and used to work in a studio in Mumbai designing animated content for children's channels. He is an alumnus of the National Institute of Design, Ahmedabad and College of Art, Delhi. He approached to design the production of M.A.D., which he later started hosting and directing. He hosted the show until 2014. He also hosted an interactive magic show called Magicskool for the channel from 2011. He then partnered with Sony Music to create a YouTube channel called MadStuffWithRob. He also hosts workshops for children and is a Graffiti artist. In 2015, he also starred in a version of the music album 'DJ Waley Babu' along with Indian rapper Badshah. In 2017, he painted the Jog Flyover in Andheri, Mumbai, as part of Viacom18's Chakachak Mumbai project, and became the brand ambassador for Windmill, India's first international festival for children. On 4 February 2018, he launched another channel "Rob in the Hood" on YouTube to feature his vlogs. In 2020, Rob collaborated with Disney India to make a new show titled Imagine That, in which he demonstrates the techniques used to make fun artistic items using the materials of daily use and provides useful tips.
