= Aranya Johar =

Indian poet and feminist (born 1998)

- Born: September 7, 1998 (age 28)
- Occupation: Poet

Aranya Johar (born September 7, 1998) is an Indian poet. She uses social media to address issues like gender equality, mental health and body positivity. She uses slam poetry to confront beauty standards. Aranya's first released piece, “A Brown Girls’s Guide to Gender” became a viral sensation and hit 1 million views within two days of its upload. She integrated spoken word in Bollywood for the first time through her collaboration with Akshay Kumar for the movie ‘Padman’. Aranya was a speaker at TEDxICTMumbai in April 2017. She has been invited and praised by various poets and foundations.

== Early life and education ==
Aranya was born on 7 September 1998 and is raised in Mumbai. She did her schooling from Lilavati Podar High School. She uses slam poetry to express her ideas. Slam poets use spoken words to perform, express identity and connect with their audience.

== Career ==
Aranya started writing down poems on misogyny issues from her teenage. Aranya performed for the first time in front of an audience when she was 12 years old. “A group used to conduct open- mic sessions at a local resto-bar, and the performer would get a cocktail shot after their performance.” She admitted that she lied about her age to get in and her mother would accompany her. She was diagnosed with Attention Deficit Disorder (ADD) when she was in Class VII. So she uses the medium to create awareness about mental health. She researches on mental condition and writes about it. During one of her performances, when she was a teen, she remembers moving a 47-year-old man to tears. The lines that made the man cry were, “As you stare at that vein kissing that knife/ think of all the things you’ll miss if you end this life/ If I were you I’d wait for the scars to fade/ if I were you I’d put down that blade.”

Aranya along with her 17-year-old friend Prachee Mashru are the force behind More Than Mics, an organization set to curate creative platforms for performance arts (poetry, music, comedy etc.). Mashru attends a school in Vile Parle (W) but they got to know each other online and bonded over their love for Canadian rapper Drake.

Aranya is also the curator of Blind Poetry Sessions, a series of poetry nights. Unlike other gigs, the Blind Poetry night takes place in a dark room, and the poets are anonymous. She is also the co-curator of another poetry event in the city, titled Throwback Thursday, wherein she asks poets to read out their first work as well as their most recent writing. She also supported and presented a poem for Gender equality, Know your rights by Vivel in association with Aaj tak and India Today. Aranya's video, 'To Bleed Without Violence' was a collaborative piece with WASH United which hit 7 million views over the weekend of the upload. She has also recited her poem for young enthusiasts of Harvard Model United Nations in 2017 at Hyderabad International Convocation Centre.

Aranya Johar has been featured on Rolling Stone and Harper Bazaar in 2017. She also performed at the SRCC Youth Conference on 22 September 2017. She has also been featured in the May edition of Teen Vogue. She has performed at the event of We The Women in association with UN Women on 9th and 10 December 2017.

She became a part of Goalkeepers New York city 2018. She spoke at Goalkeepers in New York alongside names like Ed Sheeran, Melinda Gates, Bill Gates, Stephen Fry and many more organized by the Gates Foundation and #ProjectEveryone. She has also been a part of SHEROES Summit 2018.

=== Works ===
- “A Brown Girl’s Guide to Gender” (First performed on 6 March 2017 at Tuning Fork)
- “A Brown Girl’s Guide to Beauty” (published on 7 July 2017 and was presented by Shaadi.com)
- “A Brown Girl’s Guide” – A Better Tomorrow (published by Rise by TLC on 1 January 2018)
- “To Bleed Without Violence” (published by Dasra India on 28 June 2017)
- “BleedingRani” – with Akshay Kumar (Published on 1 February 2018 by Peeping Moon)
- “To India: With Love” (Published on 29 September 2017)
- “Women Will” (Published on 29 March 2018)
- “Buy Now or Panic Later” (Published on 9 April 2017 by Airline poetry movement).

== Recognition ==
She was recognized as one of the BBC's 100 women of 2019.
