= College of Art, Delhi =

College affiliated to the University of Delhi

College of Art
- Lalita Kalā Mahāvidyālaya
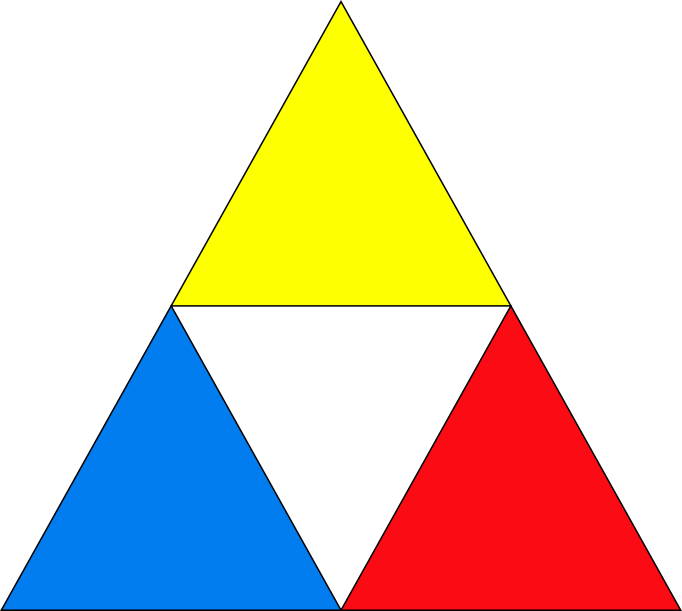
- College of Art
- Established: 1942; 84 years ago
- Academic affiliations: Delhi College of Engineering (1942-1972); Delhi University (since 1972)
- Principal: Sanjeev Kumar
- Undergraduates: 1,400
- Location: 20-22 Tilak Marg, Bhagwan Das Lane, Mandi House, New Delhi, Delhi, 110001, India; 28°37′22.83″N 77°14′18.15″E
- Campus: Urban
- Website: colart.delhi.gov.in
- Location of College of Art in Delhi

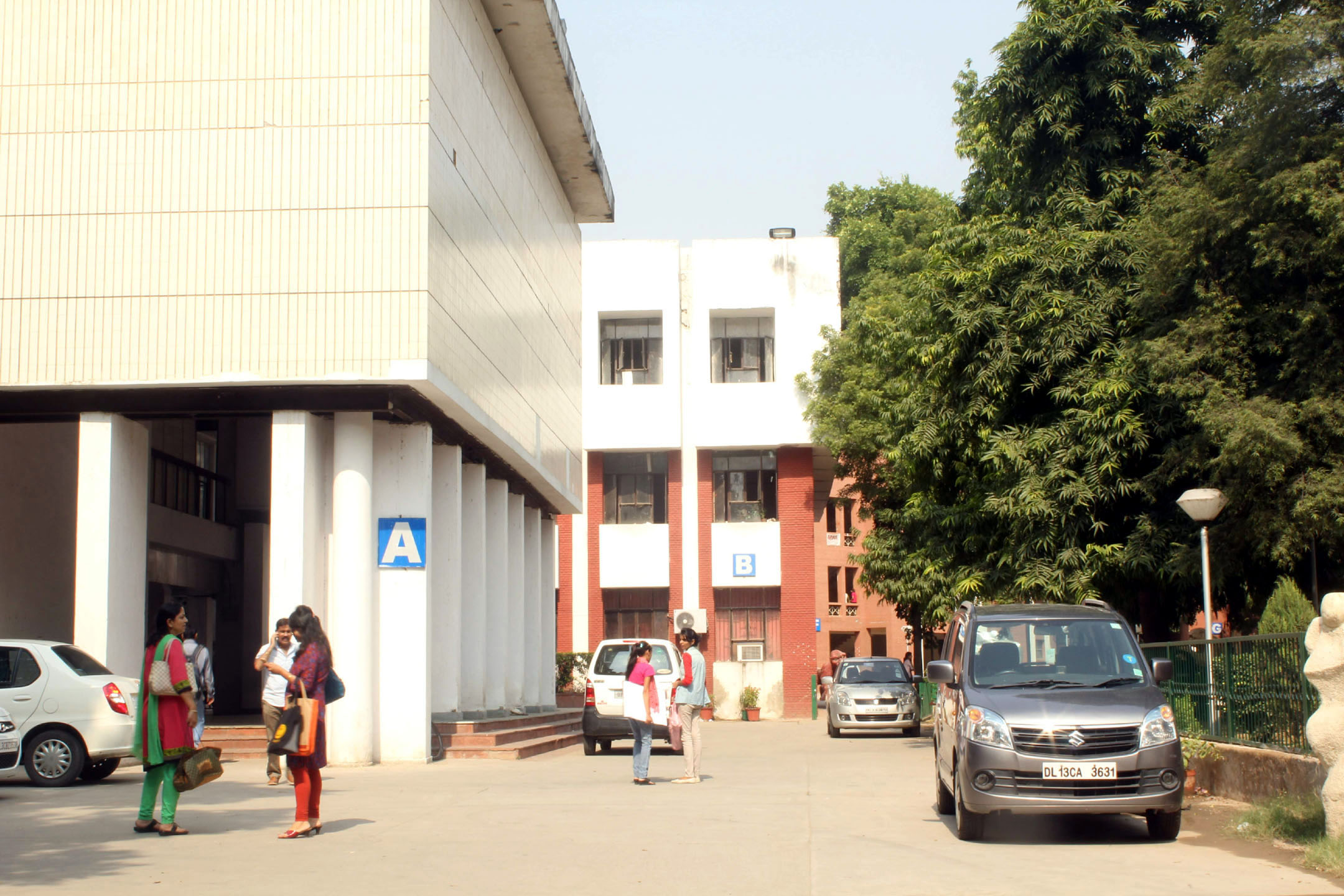
Main Building of College of Art

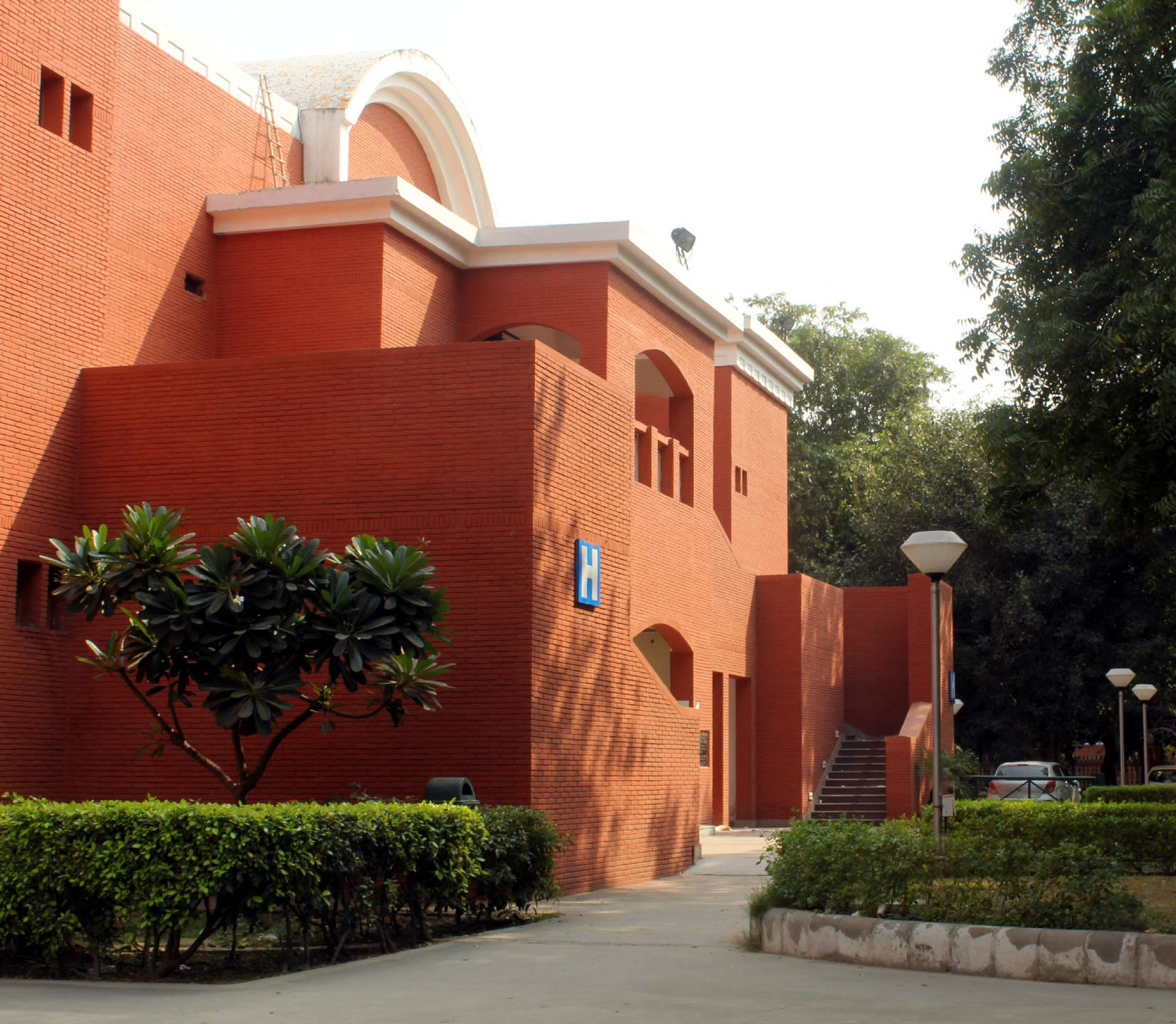
New buildings and an auditorium, designed by Satish Gujral

College of Art, Delhi (ISO: Lalita Kalā Mahāvidyālaya, Dillī) is an art college for advanced training in visual arts established in 1942 under the arts department of the Delhi College of Engineering (now Delhi Technological University). One of the oldest art colleges of India, it is run by the Government of NCT Delhi, and has been affiliated to Delhi University since 1972. It is situated on Tilak Marg, near the Supreme Court of India.

== History ==
College of Art was established in 1942 on Tilak Marg, New Delhi, where it offered three courses, later expanding to six courses, namely painting, sculpture, applied art, printmaking, visual communication and artistry.

The college is affiliated to the University of Delhi since 1972.

== Courses offered ==
The college offers courses both at graduate, post-graduate and Ph.d levels; It offers courses in most mediums of Visual Art, both Creative and Applied Art. This includes Master of Fine Art (MFA, a post graduation course of two year in duration) in Applied Art, Printmaking, Sculpture, Visual Communication and Bachelor of Fine Art (BFA, an undergraduate course with 4 years duration) in Applied Art, Art History, Printmaking, Sculpture, Visual Communication.college of Art statrted the Ph.d Deegre since 2023 in (Painting, Applied Art, Printmaking, Sculpture and Visual Communication). It imparts training in art techniques with emphasis on studio practicals, outdoor practicals, prescribed theory subjects and research in selected fields.

== Overview ==
The Annual Art Exhibition of the college, put by students is held every year during the month of March, which is the only time students are allowed to stay back over night inside the college premises. Hindustan Times and Times of India always cover these exhibition.

== Campus ==
The campus provides facilities like a library, multimedia rooms, computer-controlled looms and digital classrooms to the students, who are instructed with a structured curriculum primarily emphasising on practical training and industrial interaction rather than theoretical knowledge.

In 2008, the college added an auditorium, designed by architect as-well-as an artist Satish Gujral to its campus.

== Notable alumni ==
- Shekhar Gurera (1986–90)
- Gogi Saroj Pal
- Harun Robert
- Pradeep Sarkar (1975–79)
- Rameshwar Broota
- Shobha Broota
- Jai Jharotia
- Anupam sud
- Anandamoy Banerjee
- Paresh Maity
- Hem Raj
- Prof (Dr) Sanjeev Kumar
- Harun Robert
- Gopi Gajwani
- Dhiraj Choudhury
