= Gopi Kukde =

Indian advertising executive

Gopi Kukde is a veteran of the Indian advertising industry. His most innovative and successful creations is the Onida Devil.

He is a Gold medalist from Sir J.J. Institute of Applied Art for his college campaign for the film Meera, by Gulzar. His career marked his association with leading ad agencies like Chaitra, Clarion and Everest, and JWT. In 1982, he founded the Advertising Avenues, with two others Gautam Rakshit and Ashok Roy. Campaigns he has contributed to include Asian Paints, Glaxo, Stanrose Fabrics, Centaur Hotel, and the Hawkins pressure cooker. At Avenues, he worked on UFO Jeans, Skypak Couriers, Paan Pasand and Onida"Neighbours envy owners pride". He has produced and directed ad-films for Avenues for various brands.

He has had a long association with the Mumbai based organization CAG - Communication Arts Guild of which he was also the President. He is today one of the committee members of that guild. After 16 years of experience in different agencies, Kukde took a 10-year sabbatical to work on what he enjoys the most - ceramics. He has a studio in Mumbai called Useless Ceramics.
