= Sir J. J. Institute of Applied Art =

School of applied art in Mumbai, India

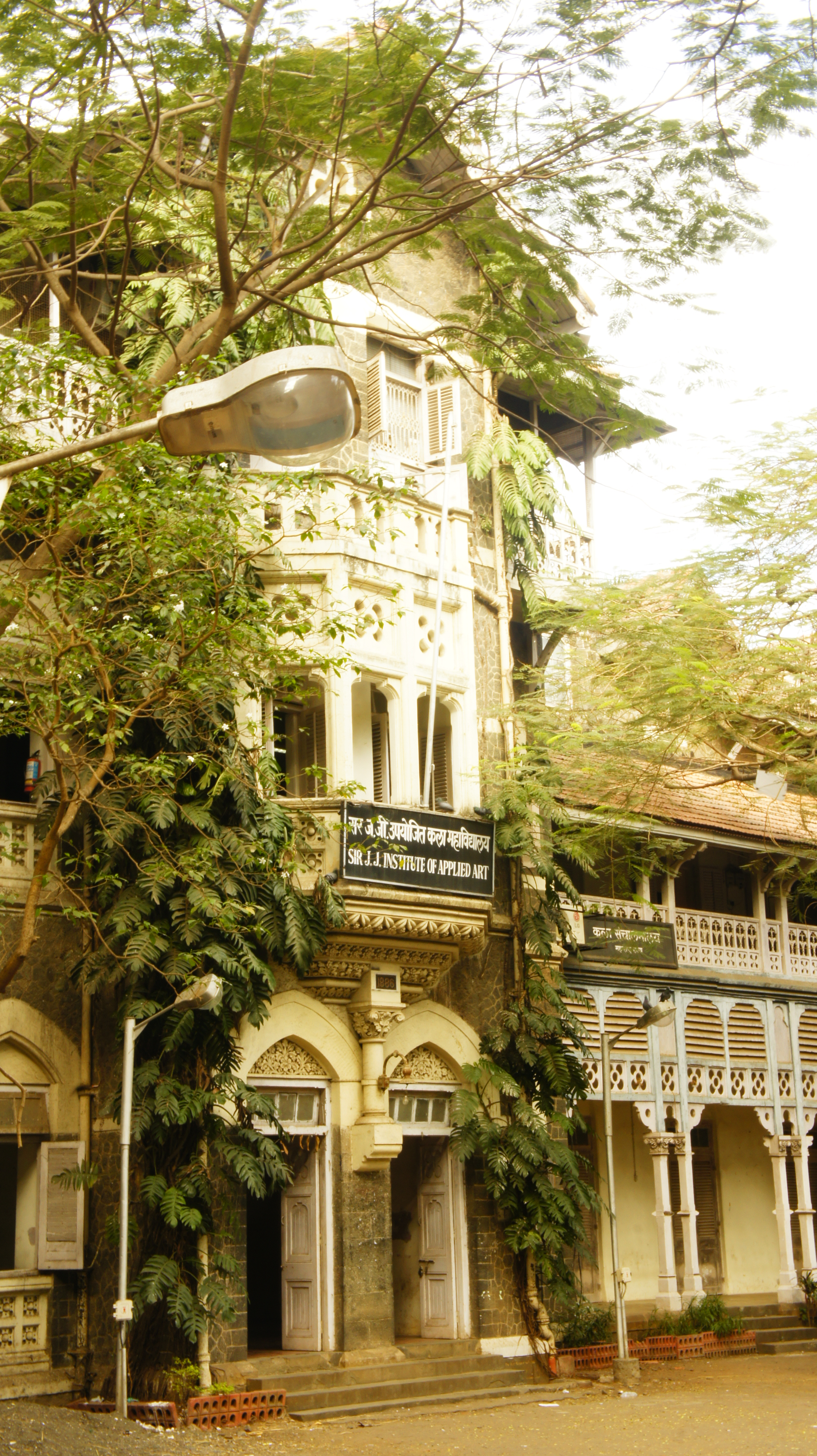
- Established: 1958; 68 years ago
- Location: Dr. D. N. Road, Fort, Mumbai - 400 001; 18.94288°N 72.83327°E
- Campus: Urban
- Website: sirjjsaad.edu.in

Sir J. J. Institute of Applied Art is an Indian applied art institution based in Mumbai. It is a state government college that was started through its sister school, the Sir J. J. School of Art. The "Sir J. J." in the name stands for Sir Jamsetjee Jeejebhoy, a Parsi philanthropist, whose name is linked to numerous historical institutions of Mumbai, such as the Sir J. J. Hospital. The institute is well known for its legacy on Indian design and advertising, as well as its historic campus.

In 1958, Sir J. J. School of Art was divided, with the Departments of Architecture and Applied Art becoming the Sir J. J. College of Architecture and Sir J. J. Institute of Applied Art R Respectively.

== History ==
=== Commercial Art Section ===
The Institute of Applied Art's history first began with the founding of its sister school, the Sir J. J. School of Art, in 1857. Sir J. J. Institute of Applied Art started operations in the premises of the School of Art in 1935, and was awarded an independent institute status in 1961.

In 1946, Sir JJ School of Art started a new department, the Commercial Art Section, or CAS. The objective of this division was to impart all of the necessary training in art with an eye on students being able to exploit this training for commercial purposes.

During the Second World War the school was threatened with closure. At the time the school was run by the British Bombay government and its funding came directly from the government. In preparation for the looming war many committees were set up to review excess government expenditure and divert money to defense needs. The scrutiny of one such "Thomas Committee" fell on the Sir J. J. School of Art. The committee recommended that the school be shut down, claiming that it only contributed to furthering personal talents of artists and was of no use to society in general.

The director of the J. J. School of Art set out to rectify the situation. In 1935, Mr. Soloman was the dean of J.J. In 1946, J. J. School of Art started a new department, the Commercial Art Section, or CAS. The objective of this division was to impart all of the necessary training in art with an eye on students being able to exploit this training for commercial purposes. A direct contribution of this section was to aid the war preparations of the government by designing propaganda and public awareness posters. This exercise was a huge success. Therefore, the government decided not to shut down the Sir J. J. School of Art. The students trained at the CAS soon found that they were in considerable demand from the commercial industries of Mumbai (then Bombay) to design publicity material. Also, the fledgling advertising industry lapped up talent from the CAS, creating a set of people who would end up being counted among the founders of Indian advertising.

The CAS became popular among applicants to the Sir J. J. School of Art, as it offered a direct means of earning a livelihood to skilled artists who had completed the course. Soon, this once-small section of the school began receiving more student applications than the main part of the institute. At this time India had gained independence. The government, which still ran the school, separated the CAS from the rest of the school and created the Sir J. J. Institute of Applied Art. Professor V. N. Adarkar was named the institutes first principal and later went on to become its first dean.

=== Later history ===
Over the years, Sir J. J. Institute of Applied Art has been involved with several projects on social awareness that include "Know the Five-Year Plan" in the 1950s, "Our Himalayas" during the 1963 Sino-Indian War, and the "International Tourist Fair — Bombay" in 1965.

== Present ==
The current course leads to successful students receiving a Bachelor of Fine Arts (BFA) in Applied Art from the University of Mumbai. The total duration of this course is four years, with the first year referred to as a "Foundation" year, and the later three being referred to as "Specialization" years. A student chooses their area of major specialization from amongst areas such as Illustration, Photography, Typography, Exhibition Design Display and Stagecraft or Computer Graphics.

The Sir J. J. Institute of Applied Art provides more than half of the Indian advertising industry's top art talent. There is a widely held belief among past professors of the institute, as well as art educators, that it would be best for the future health of the institution if the state government grants autonomy to the institute. This would clear the way to a much-needed revamp of the quality of teaching and infrastructure and bring modern day requirements to the school.

The campus is located in South Mumbai (opposite CSMT station) and houses the Sir J. J. Institute of Applied Art, the Sir J. J. School of Art, Sir J. J. College of Architecture, and the Government Institute of Printing Technology. The campus contains many trees that are more than a century old, and houses numerous heritage buildings.

=== The Kipling connection ===
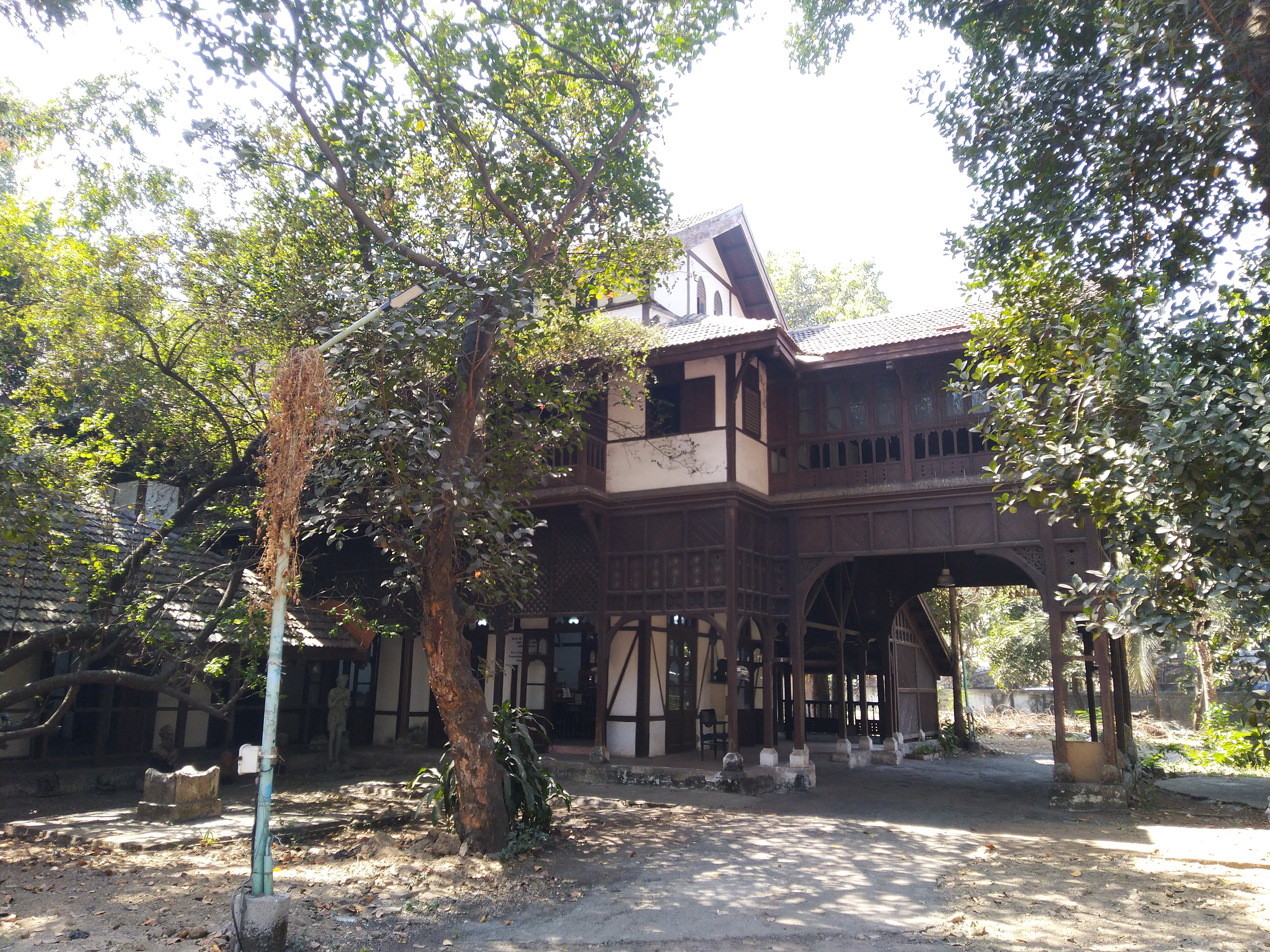
The Kipling Bungalow

Famed writer Rudyard Kipling was born on the campus in 1865, in a later-demolished bungalow, during the deanship of his father John Lockwood Kipling. Adjacent to this building's former site, the Kipling Bungalow was built in 1882 after Rudyard was sent to England.

A plaque at the entrance of this house is engraved with the words, "Rudyard Kipling, son of Lockwood Kipling, first dean of Sir JJ School of Art, was born here on December 30, 1865." A bust of Rudyard Kipling exists at the entrance to the bungalow.

A physical restoration of the building was completed by early 2019.

== Notable alumni ==
- Arun Kolatkar, poet
- Prabhakar Barwe, painter
- Prof. R. K. Joshi, calligrapher and type designer
- Nana Patekar, actor and filmmaker
- Rajiv Rao, advertiser
- Raj Thackeray, politician and social worker
- Uddhav Thackeray, 19th Chief Minister of Maharashtra
- Gopi Kukde, advertiser
- Akbar Padamsee, artist
- Brendan Pereira, creative director and designer
- Sunil Padwal, painter
- Kunal Vijaykar, actor and youtuber
- Shivkar Bapuji Talpade, aircraft constructor
- Gitanjali Rao, actress and filmmaker
