= Sir J. J. School of Art =

Art institution in Mumbai, India

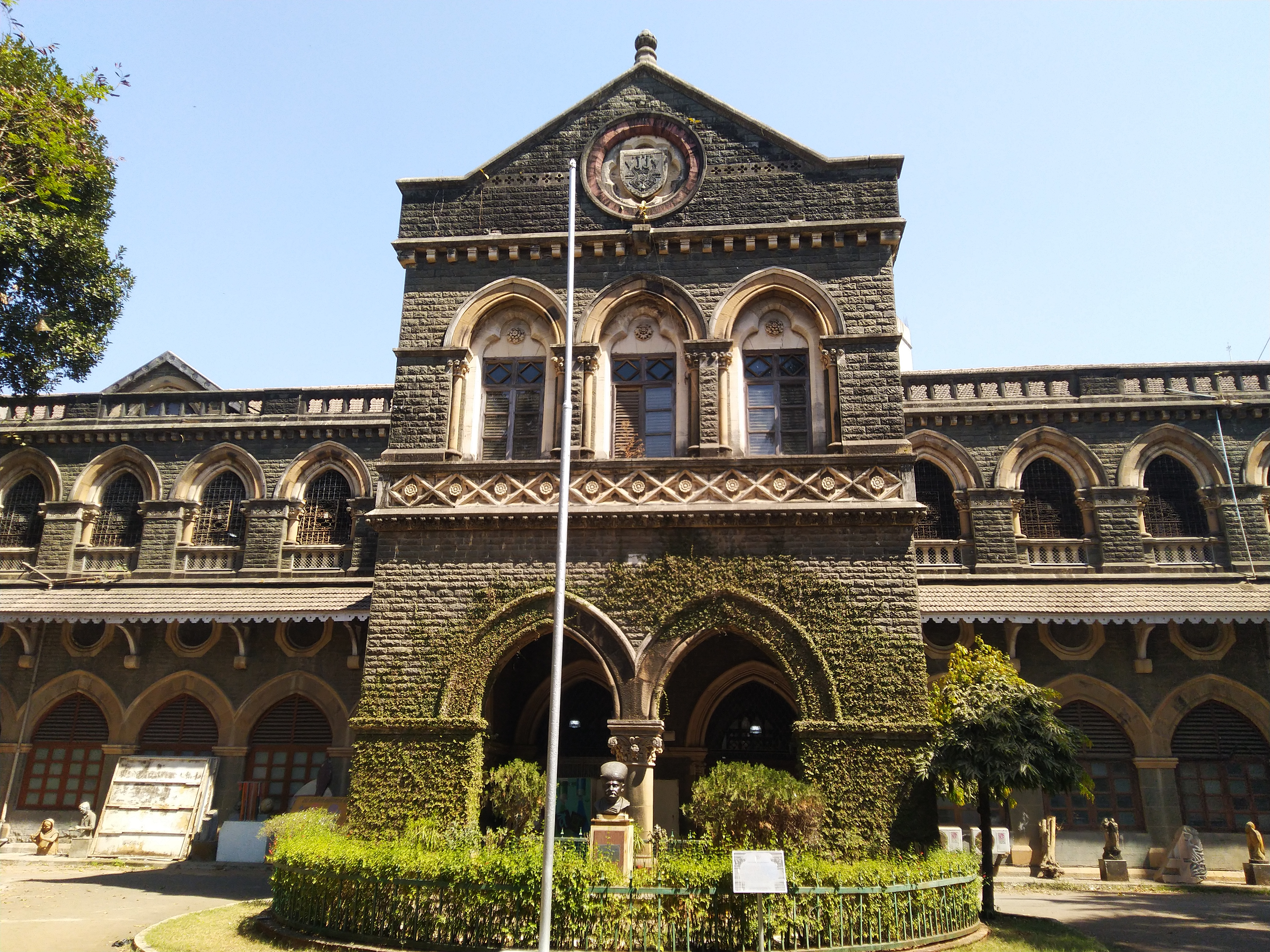
- Type: Public art school
- Established: March 1857; 169 years ago
- Accreditation: AICTE
- Affiliations: University of Mumbai
- Dean: Vishwanath D. Sabale
- Location: 78, Dr. D. N. Road, Fort, Mumbai - 400 001; 18.94505°N 72.83352°E
- Campus: Urban
- Website: sirjjsaad.edu.in

The Sir Jamsetjee Jeejeebhoy School of Art (Sir J. J. School of Art) is the oldest art institution in Mumbai, India, and is deemed to be a university. The school grants bachelor's (B.F.A) degrees in Painting, ceramic, Metal work, Interior decoration, Textile design and Sculpture as well as master's degrees (M.F.A.) in Portraiture, Creative Painting, Murals, Sculpture, and Printmaking.

== History ==
=== Early history ===
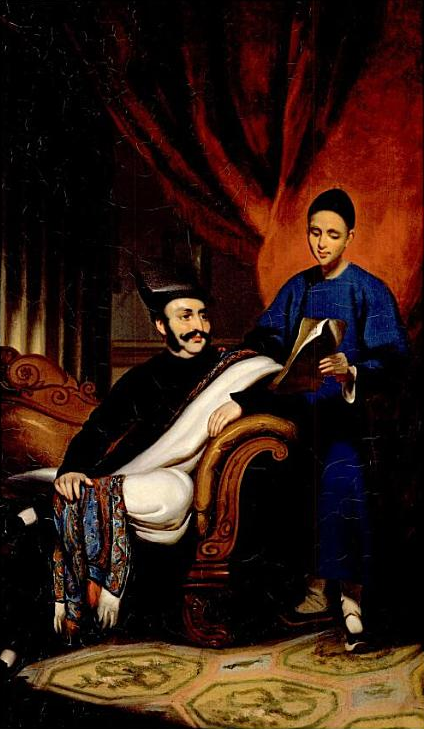
Sir Jamsetjee Jeejebhoy and his Chinese secretary (1783–1859); portrait at the Sir J. J. School of Art

The School founded in March 1857, was named after Sir Jamsetjee Jeejebhoy, a businessman and philanthropist who donated Rs. 100,000 for its endowment. Operations were managed by a committee headed by the Chief Justice of Bombay. The School's first class was in drawing, and began on 2 March 1857. Classes were held at the Elphinstone Institution. John Griffiths became Principal of the School in 1865. He later became famous for copying the murals in the Ajanta Caves temple complex, a project which lasted from 1872 to 1891, and which the School's students assisted in.

In 1866, management of the school was taken over by the Government of India. Also in 1866, Lockwood Kipling, who had become a professor of the School in 1865, established three ateliers for (i) Decorative Paintings, (ii) Modelling; and (iii) Ornamental Wrought Iron Work, and became its first dean. He was the father of the author Rudyard Kipling, who was born on the School's campus. In 1878, the school moved to its own building, where it is currently situated. The building was designed by architect George Twigge Molecey, in neo Gothic architecture. The School campus, including the Kipling House, better known as the Dean's Bungalow, is classified as Grade II heritage structure by the Government of Maharashtra, and underwent a restoration in 2002-2006, and again in 2008.

Drawing instruction as a subject was introduced in 1879 and a programme for training drawing teachers was started in 1893. In 1891, the Lord Reay Art Workshops (now known as the Department of Art-Crafts) were established.

=== 1900s ===
The School had an important tradition in architecture. In 1900, the School offered its first course in architecture, taught by John Begg, later Consulting Architect of Bombay and of the Government of India. A complete 4-year programme was established in 1908 under Begg's assistant George Wittet. In 1917, architect Claude Batley became a visiting professor; he was Principal of the School from 1923 to 1943, and is commemorated in the Claude Batley Architectural Gallery for architectural exhibitions, opened in 1996.

In 1896, the Draughtsman's classes, the nucleus of the Department of Architecture, were added. This Department was later organised for a 3 years Diploma Course which was duly recognised by the R.I.B.A. Board.

In 1910, the Sir George Clarke Studies and Laboratories were built for the advanced study of crafts, pottery being the first craft taken up for study. In 1929, the head of the School was renamed "Director", and in 1935, the Department of Commercial Art was also started.

In 1937 M.R. Acharekar was appointed deputy director and continued his tenure till 1939. Shri. V. S. Adurkar was the first Indian head of the school, succeeding Claude Batley as Director in 1943.

=== Post-independence ===
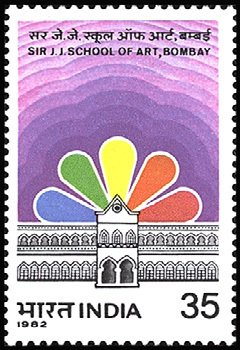
125th Anniv Sir J J School of Art Bombay Stamp of India - 1982

In 1958, the school was divided, with the Departments of Architecture and Applied Art becoming the Sir J. J. College of Architecture and Sir J.J. Institute of Applied Art respectively.

In 1981, the school became affiliated with the University of Mumbai. In 2023, the school was accorded the status of a deemed university by the University Grants Commission

== List of alumni ==
- António Xavier Trindade
- Angela Trindade
- A. R. Hye (1919–2008)
- A.A. Raiba (1922–2016)
- Akbar Padamsee (1928–2020), painter
- Abid Surti (born 1935)
- Amol Palekar (born 1944), actor
- Antonio Piedade da Cruz (1895–1982), painter and sculptor
- Arun Kolatkar (1932–2004)
- Atul Dodiya (born 1959)
- B. V. Doshi (1927–2023), architect
- Bhanu Athaiya (1929--2020), costume designer
- Brendan Pereira (1928--2024), advertiser
- Dadasaheb Phalke (1870–1944), film director
- Divita Rai Miss Universe India 2022
- Francis Newton Souza (1924–2002), painter
- Govind Solegaonkar (1912–1986), painter
- Homai Vyarawalla (1913–2012), photojournalist
- James Ferreira (born 1956), fashion designer
- Jatin Das (born 1941), painter
- Jitish Kallat (born 1974)
- Justin Samarasekera (1916–2003), architect
- K. K. Hebbar (1911–1996)
- K. K. Menon (1925-1999)
- Kalidas Shrestha (1923–2016)
- Laxman Pai (1926–2021), painter
- M. F. Hussain (1915–2011), painter
- M. V. Dhurandhar (1867–1944), painter, vice-principal of the school
- Nadhiya (born 1966), actor
- Nana Patekar (born 1951), actor and filmmaker
- Nitin Chandrakant Desai(1965--2023), art director and production designer
- Pralhad Anant Dhond (1908–2001), Dean of Sir J. J. School of Art from 1958
- Pramila Dandavate (1928–2001), socialist leader and Member of Parliament, Lok Sabha
- R. D. Raval (1928–1980)
- R.Verman (1947–2019)
- Raj Thackeray (born 1968), president of Maharashtra Navnirman Sena
- Ram V. Sutar (1925–2025), sculptor
- Ratnadeep Adivrekar (born 1974), artist
- Reena Saini Kallat (born 1973), painter
- Riyas Komu (born 1971), artist
- Syed Haider Raza (1922–2016), painter
- Sadanand Bakre (1920–1987), painter
- Saryu Doshi (born 1932), art historian and Padma Shri awardee
- Shashi Bikram Shah (born 1940), Nepali artist
- Shivkar Bapuji Talpade (1864–1916)
- Tyeb Mehta (1925–2009), painter
- Uday Shankar (1900–1977), dancer
- V. S. Gaitonde (1924–2001), painter
- Waman Thakre (born 1932), photographer and Padma Shri awardee
