= Sunil Padwal =

Indian artist

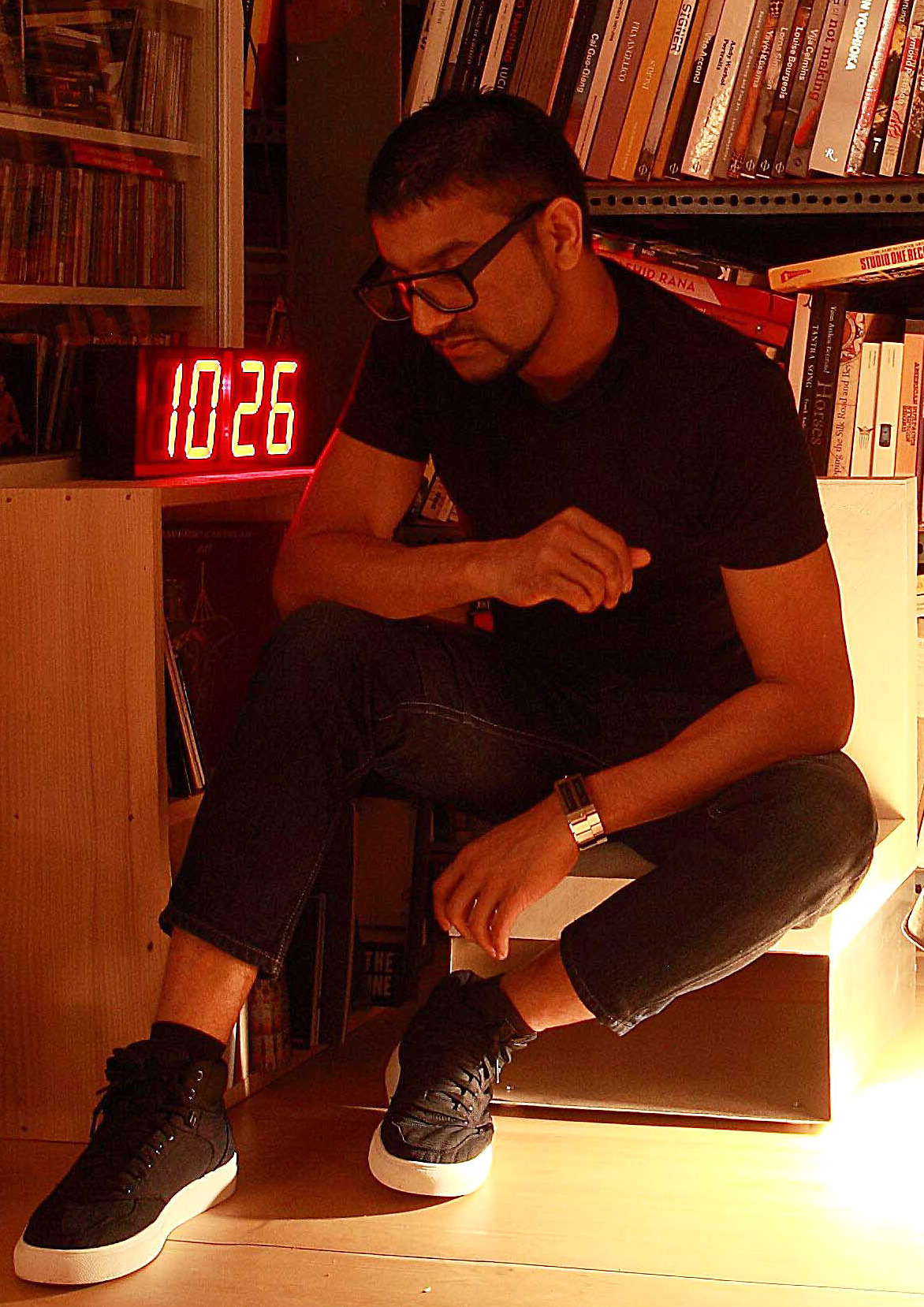
- Sunil Padwal in his studio (2012)
- Born: Sunil Chandrakant Padwal; 1968 (age 57–58); Mumbai, India
- Known for: visual art, installation art, painting

Sunil Padwal (born 1968) is an Indian painter based in Mumbai, India.

== Background ==
Sunil was born in Maharashtra, India. He did BFA foundation from Sir J. J. School of Art, Mumbai in 1986 and Bachelor of Fine Arts from Sir J. J. Institute of Applied Art, Mumbai in 1989.

He works on line drawings, paintings, sculptures and installations. He lives and works in Mumbai

== Work ==
Sunil Padwal, is known for his anguished protagonist. His line drawing series is a culmination of memory, confused metropolis, changing cityscape, and various turpitudes of modern-day society. Padwal seeks inspiration from different aspects of everyday life, including work in progress, pollution everywhere, fast changing skyline, noisy traffic, humans and animals stuck in today's concrete jungle.

MYOPIA an exhibition in Mumbai in 2008 explored issues relating to the Mumbai terror attack, with images of war and terror. It contained images of the female form and art installations. India Today commented that his "recent works almost feels like they are a reflection of the mood of the country at the moment."

== Awards ==
- Communication Artist Guild Award (CAG – 1990)
- Emerging Artist of The Year Award (The Harmony Show III– 1998), Nehru Centre, Mumbai
- Society Young Achievers Award (Fine Art – 2004).
