= AICAR =

AICAR may refer to:

- Asian Institute of Communication and Research, better known as AICAR Business School, Matheran, India
- Acadesine
- AICA ribonucleotide
- Inosine monophosphate synthase, an enzyme
