= Communication Arts Guild =

Indian advertising organization

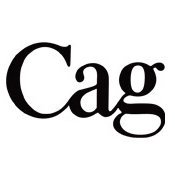
- The Registered Logo of Cag
- Abbreviation: Cag
- Established: 1948
- Type: Indian Communication Arts
- Legal status: Active
- Headquarters: 1/4, Malhotra House, Walchand Hirachand Marg, Fort, Mumbai, India

Communication Arts Guild or CAG is an organisation dedicated to the Indian advertising industry. Located in Mumbai, this is the only organisation which has the complete record of the growth of Indian Advertising since Independence.

== History ==
CAG was founded in 1948. It created its own Constitution, in 1950, registered under the Indian Societies Registration Act XXI of 1860. The vision was to create a networking platform within the fraternity of Visual Communication Industry.

== Cag awards ==
CAG distributes a number of awards, including: the Cub Trophies for communication arts and design students; scholarships for pre-final year Art students; the Guru of the Year award; and the CAG Hall of Fame. Hall of Fame members include:

- 1980–1981 – P.N.Sharma, S.Das Gupta and Umesh Rao
- 1981–1982 – Waghulkar
- 1982–1983 – Kishore Parekh and Victor Fernandes
- 1983–1984 – Mitter Bedi and Hasan Taj
- 1984–1985 – Nagendra Parmar and R.R.Prabhu
- 1985–1986 – Kersy Katrak
- 1986–1987 – Frank Simoes
- 1987–1988 – Alyque Padamsee
- 1988–1989 – Arun Kolatkar
- 1989–1990 – R K Joshi
- 1990–1991 – Vilas Bhende
- 1991–1992 – Sylvester DaCunha
- 1992–1993 – Ivan Arthur
- 1993–1994 – Brendan Pereira
- 1994–1995 – Mohammad Khan
- 1995–1996 – Ravi Paranjpe
- 1996–1997 – Ram Mohan
- 1997–1998 – Avinash Godbole
- 1998–1999 – Ravi Gupta
- 1999–2000 – Gerson da Cunha
- 2000–2001 – Sudarshan Dheer
- 2001–2002 – S.A.Sabir
- 2002–2003 – Panna Jain
- 2003–2004 – Arun Kale
- 2004–2005 – Samir Khanzode
- 2005–2006 – Kamlesh Pandey
- 2006–2007 – Viru Hiremath
- 2007–2008 – Piyush Pandey
- 2008–2009 – Sheila Syed
- 2009–2010 – Bhai Patki
- 2010–2011 – Roby D'Silva
- 2011–2012 – Sagar Gadve

== Cag Shield Cricket Tournament ==
The Cag Shield is a cordial play of short matches between different agencies within the advertising fraternity. Cag developed a connection with individual designers by the awards and workshops or seminars but they wanted to grow bigger. To get agencies' interaction, with each other and Cag, they started this sporty tradition and is continuing even today. This brings the agencies to interact and open up to each other in a group activity apart from advertising.

== Cag Annuals ==
First published in 1950, Cag Annuals were design magazines published yearly. They showcased advertising works in that particular year and also mentioned the Cag winners, Hall of Fame and Young Cags of that year. They also had the photographic record of the events in that year, especially the award show.
