= Pralhad Anant Dhond =

Indian artist (1908–2001)

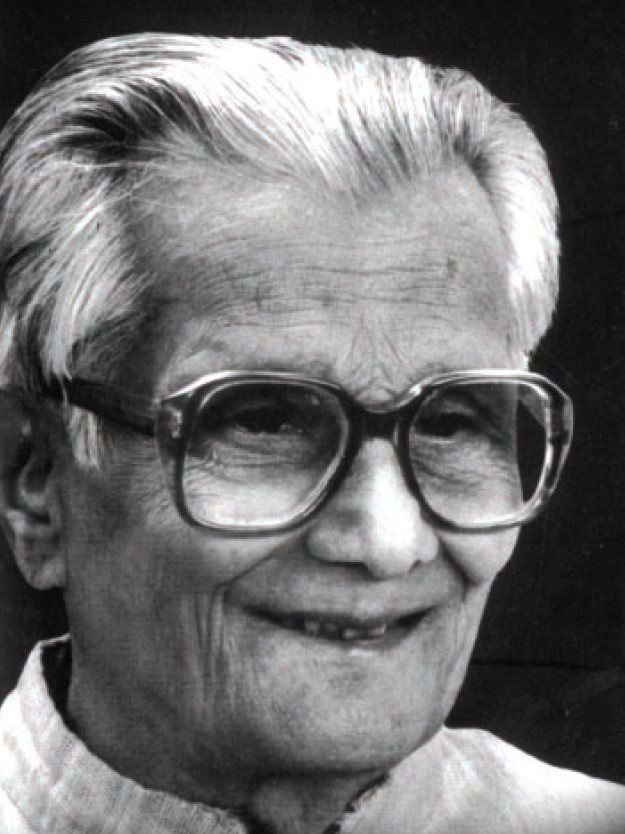
- Born: Pralhad Anant Dhond; 1908; Ratnagiri, Bombay Presidency, British India
- Died: 2001 (aged 92–93); Mumbai
- Education: Sir J. J. School of Art
- Known for: Painting

Pralhad Anant Dhond (1908–2001) was an Indian painter and art educator.

== Early life background ==
Dhond was born in 1908 in Ratnagiri. After finishing his schooling in Malvan, he moved to Mumbai where he studied at Sir J. J. School of Art in years 1930–1934. He then pursued The Art Teachers Examination in 1935, soon followed by a master's degree in art in 1937.

== Career ==
He was the Head of Teacher's Training Department for 20 years. From year 1958 he was Dean of Sir J. J. School of Art, Mumbai. He retired as the Director of Art Maharashtra State in 1969 His paintings were exhibited in San Francisco, Berlin, Munich, South Africa, Kabul, Ankara, China and Russia. In India through the All India Fine Arts and Crafts Society, Delhi, Bhau Daji Lad Museum, Lalit Kala Akademi, Vidhan Bhavan, Bombay, Nagpur Central Museum, Nagpur, Baroda Museum, Baroda. A strong believer in artistic tradition, Dhond, always considered the landscape of Ratnagiri in Maharashtra, where he grew up, as the most formative influence on his artistic sensibility. Dhond chose the medium of watercolour for his transparent yet fascinating depiction of various moods of nature and was known as one of the leading water-colourists of India. He constantly worked and travelled to enrich his work. At the age of 92, he visited the Kerala backwaters and had almost completed his series on God's own country at the time of his death. His work consists of 7,000 landscapes, spanning over seven decades. He says about his work "I always say it takes me five minutes and 70 years to complete a painting. It is only after devoting a lifetime to water colours that I have mastered the medium".

He recalls his journey as an artist in his autobiography 'Raapan'. It has an important place in the history of art. The oral history was narrated to and written by Sambhaji Kadam. To celebrate Dhond's 111th birth anniversary an exhibition of his paintings was organized in 2019 in Mumbai at Jehangir Art gallery.
