= Waman Thakre =

Indian photographer (1932–2016)

- Born: 24 April 1932; Ramtek, Nagpur district, Maharashtra, India
- Died: 6 December 2016 (aged 84); Bhopal, India
- Occupation: Photographer
- Awards: Padma Shri; Shikhar Award

Waman Thakre (24 April 1932 – 6 December 2016) was an Indian photographer and deputy director at the Directorate of Panchayat and Social Service of the Government of Madhya Pradesh. He is a Fellow of the Royal Photographic Society and the Photographic Society of America and is a recipient of the Shikhar Award of the MP State government. The Government of India awarded him the fourth highest civilian honour of the Padma Shri, in 2007, for his contributions to Arts.

== Biography ==
Waman Thakre was born in a Marathi family on 24 April 1932 at Ramtek, a village in Nagpur district of the Western Indian state of Maharashtra and did his schooling at Samarth Vidyalaya, Ramtek and New Era High School, Nagpur. His college education was Chitrakala Mahavidyalaya, Nagpur and Sir Jamsetjee Jeejebhoy School of Art, Mumbai and after graduating in commercial art and photography, he started his career as an artist under state government service. He rose in ranks at government service and was a deputy director at the Directorate of Panchayat and Social Service of the Government of Madhya Pradesh at the time of his superannuation.

Thakre has conducted several exhibitions in India and abroad and holds several rare photographs in his collection; one of the photographs, a portrait of Rani Lakshmi Bai he displayed at World Photography Day exhibition at Bhopal in 2010, invited controversy as to the authenticity of the work. He is the advisor of Photolovers, an Indore-based photographic organization, and is involved with promotion of photography in the state. The Government of Madhya Pradesh awarded him Shikhar Award in 1988 and he received the fourth highest Indian civilian award of the Padma Shri in 2007.

Thakre lives in Bhopal, in Madhya Pradesh.

Thakre died on 6 December 2016, at the age of 84.

== See also ==
- Sir Jamsetjee Jeejebhoy School of Art
