= R. D. Raval =

Indian artist

R.D. Raval (1928 in Sardoi, Gujarat, India – October 1980) was an Indian artist. He should be distinguished from an earlier artist, Ravishankar Raval (1892–1977), who painted in a completely different style.

Raval's stylized figures and elegantly simple lines made his pictures accessible. His art is in several collections, including India's National Gallery of Modern Art in New Delhi, (which made prints of his "Nandi" for sale to the public); and the Lalit Kala Akademi.

Raval studied at the Sir J. J. School of Art in Bombay, and won awards from a number of institutions, including the Bombay Art Society, Lalit Kala Akademi, and Academy of Fine Arts of Calcutta.

He had a number of exhibitions of his work, mainly in Bombay, New Delhi and Calcutta; he participated in one exhibition in Stamford. He had several exhibitions at the Jehangir Art Gallery in Bombay, an institution that has supported a number of eminent Indian artists.
