= AICAR Business School =

Coordinates: 19°2′52″N 73°19′13″E

- Type: Private business school
- Established: 2002
- Location: Neral, Raigad, Maharashtra, India
- Campus: Rural, 33 acres (0.13 km^{2})
- Website: www.aicar.net

The Asian Institute of Communication and Research, better known as AICAR Business School or simply AICAR, is a management institute located in Matheran, about 90 minutes from Mumbai in India. AICAR is a residential institute.

== History ==
AICAR Business School was established in 2002 by the co-founder and Chairman of Chaitra Leo Burnett, Mr. Walter Saldanha. It was inaugurated by Mr. Kerry Rubie, Vice Chairman, Leo Burnett Worldwide. Ivan Arthur, former national creative director of JWT India is a trustee and visiting faculty at the institute. In 2007 the institute entered into an alliance with Aptech Limited, a retail and corporate training firm headquartered in Mumbai.

== Programmes ==
AICAR offers a two-year full-time residential PGDM programme approved by the All India Council of Technical Education, New Delhi.

The course includes specializations in Communications, Marketing, Financial Services, Banking Insurance and Finance, Aviation Business and Human Resource Management. AICAR offers Management Development Programmes (MDPs) which are both general and industry specific on courses and qualifications, across a range of sectors, with all courses marked by external examiners to an ISO 9001 quality standard. The institute also offers on site training for corporate companies along with access to business management classes on campus designed for working executives.

== Location ==
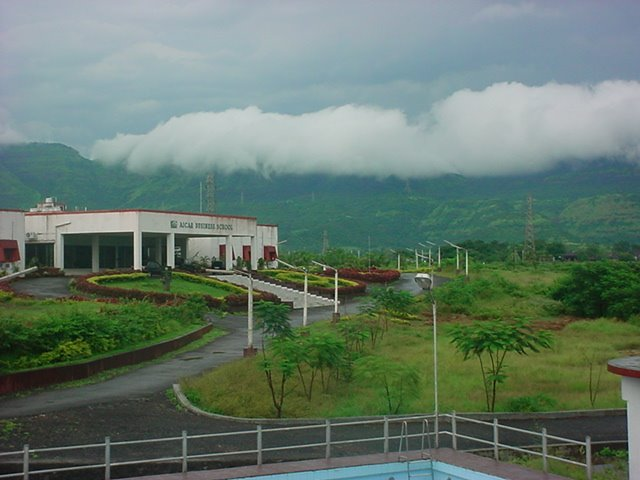
AICAR Campus

The school is located at Neral, Maharashtra, in the foothills of Matheran, near Karjat, beside the Ulhas River.

Situated 1.5 km from the Neral Railway Station and 1.5 hours by train or car from Mumbai, it has easy access to the Mumbai metropolis and Pune.

== Board of Governors ==
- Walter Saldanha (Chairman), Chairman and Managing Director of Chaitra Holdings Pvt. Ltd.
- Ivan Arthur (Vice Chairman), former National Creative Director of Hindustan Thompson Associates, now known as JWT
- Ninad Karpe, CEO and MD, Aptech
- Dr. Pramod Khera, Managing Trustee
- Subodh Sapra, former president, Polyester Sector, Reliance Industries
- Homi Ayrton, Chartered Accountant
- Ravi Dighe, Executive Vice President of Aptech, and Managing Trustee
- T. Ravishankar, Executive Vice President of Aptech
- R. Krishnan, Executive Vice President of Aptech

The Director is Dr. S. Kutty.
