= James Ferreira =

- Born: 25 July 1956 (age 70)
- Education: Sir J.J. School of Art, Mumbai
- Occupation: Fashion designer
- Label: James Ferreira

James Ferreira (born James Christopher Joseph Ferreira; 25 July 1956) is an Indian fashion designer and founder of the ‘James Ferreira’ designer label.

He started his design career in 1976 and currently his label retails in all major boutiques across India. Early Bollywood stars, to current International celebrities like Freida Pinto, have worn the designer's creations.

The designer lives and works out of the 47-G Bungalow at Khotachiwadi, which is one of the last surviving Heritage villages of Bombay. Ferreira is also an active member of the URBZ group that works towards preserving heritage districts and areas within metros. He has been vociferously opposing the take over bid of Khotachiwadi by businesspeople from Bombay and mobilizing support for the cause.

== Early life ==
James Ferreira was born in 1956, to Owen and Thelma Ferreira in Bombay. Father Owen Ferreira was a hockey olympian and his maternal ancestor was a Portuguese ambassador to India.

Ferreira illustrated clothes and stylized figures through his school life, which manifested into a career choice after reading an article illustrating the works of designer Pierre Cardin in 1964. He pursued a foundation course in commercial art at the Sir J.J. School of Art (1974–75) and further completed a tailoring course at the Sheroo Coopers academy of tailoring (1976–78) in Mumbai.

== Career ==
After completing his education in 1976, he began his career designing for Purple Pussycat in 1976. It was one of the earliest designer wear boutiques in Bombay catering to the expats and socialites. He then went on to work with various textile houses, boutiques and private clients, and worked as a designer under the British designer Zandra Rhodes in 1982.

In 1992 continuing with his position as the Creative Head at the Boutiques Bada Saab and First Lady, he established a production unit and a studio for his namesake label ‘James Ferreira’.

In 2006 he debuted at the Lakme India Fashion week and subsequently in 2011 he collaborated with Veryta Foundation run by Stefano Pilati, design director Yves Saint Laurent and Filippo Binaghi, of Lorma SLR, Como, Italy to showcase a collection at the AW’11 Wills India Fashion Week.

In May 2013 he launched a collection of Diamond Jewelry in collaboration with Gehna Jewelers.
