= Ivan Arthur =

- Occupations: Instrumentalist, creative director
- Instrument: Mandolin

Ivan Arthur is former national creative director of JWT India, one of the leading advertising agencies in the world. He spent 38 years in advertising before retiring in 2002. He is also a trustee of Asian Institute of Communication and Research, better known as AICAR Business School near Matheran.

== Career ==
He started his career as a recording artist. Playing the mandolin for Bollywood movies, even played for music composer Salil Chowdhury. Later he joined weekly magazine Tide as reporter and sub-editor. Few years later he joined Studio One as a copywriter. In 1964 he joined JWT (then HTA) as a copywriter, one of the leading advertising agencies in the world. Arthur has been part of the 10-member global team that put together the Thompson Total Branding Protocol.

Ivan Arthur has been the brain behind many award-winning advertisements for Air India, Sunsilk, Clinic, Hamdard, Bombay Dyeing, Handyplast, Reader's Digest, Haryana Breweries and Philips.

In 2002, he joined as trustee of Asian Institute of Communication and Research, better known as AICAR Business School in Matheran, which founded in 2002, by was co-founder and Chairman of Chaitra Leo Burnett, Walter Saldanha.

Ivan Arthur also written few books, Pavement Prayers, a biography of Goa's industrialist - Mr PJ Menezes -entitled Once More Upon a Time, Official Souvenir of Pope John Paul II's visit to India and Brands under fire, which he co-wrote with Kurien Matthews, former director, TBWA/India.

He has now retired and lives in Goa.

== Achievements ==
Ivan Arthur has been also inducted into the Communication Arts Guild (CAG) Hall of Fame. He has also addressed several national and international advertising groups across the world.
