= Ratnadeep Adivrekar =

Indian artist

- Born: 13 November 1974 (age 51); Mumbai, India
- Education: Sir J. J. School of Art
- Known for: Painting

Ratnadeep Gopal Adivrerkar (born 13 November 1974, in Mumbai) is a contemporary artist from India. He has had several important solo exhibitions including one at NUS Museum, Singapore, Galerie Sylvia Bernhardt, Germany and Pavillon du Centanarie/Arcelor Mittal, Luxembourg. In 2013, Ratnadeep exhibited at the prestigious Deutsche Oper Berlin a series of works titled 'The Golden Ear- A Tribute to Wagner', based on German Composer Richard Wagner and mainly his epic opera "Der Ring des Nibelungen" (Ring of Nibelungs). The work revolves around Ratnadeep's philosophical interpretation with connection to especially to Indo-Global mythological context with contemporary times. He has participated in many group exhibitions like 'Sarang', Seoul, Korea; Pictures of Asia, Larasati, Singapore; 'Indian contemporary art', Chelsea College of Arts, UK; Uneo Royal Museum, Japan; Ao~rta Project, BBK Kunst Forum, Düsseldorf and Ausstellungshalle Innenhafen, Duisburg, Germany. He has received a number of awards and scholarships. Ratnadeep lives and works in Mumbai, India and Berlin, Germany.

== Early life and education ==
Ratnadeep Adivrekar was born in 1974 in Mumbai, India. He is the son of artist Gopal S. Adivrekar. He received his Bachelor of Fine Arts in painting with first class in 1997 from one of the oldest and renowned institute in Mumbai Sir Jamsetjee Jeejebhoy School of Art.

== Work ==
Ratnadeep's artistic multiplicity, and his resistance to any form of categorisation, can be seen as the consistent theme in his work. In Ratnadeep's works the original source or elements from photographic motifs are patched together in new constellations of allegories thus the paintings have a sort of leaping structure of narratives within narratives. Ratnadeep creates works that have an open-ended narrative and evoke the idea of exploring eternal subjects like existence, death, understanding different facets of philosophy. His work refers directly to the enigma of metamorphosis and his imagery whispers to the subconscious coaxing it to the surface. Making us aware of Ratnadeep's beliefs, the richness of his symbolism but yet mysterious eluding the logically understandable things and combine to make new resonances. He plays with the associational nature of thinking and how often a deliberate act of misunderstanding that can become poetry on canvas. Crowd scenes have become a constant feature in his work in recent years, the systematic-chaos or chaotic-system of crowds from processions and rallies to battles and concerts. The high-octane energy and movement of large gatherings is a reminder, perhaps, of the potential of the crowd or organised mass.

Ratnadeep's works invite the spectator to consider. His task is to reintroduce their significance into a tension with form – but without allowing the images he uses to fall into utter nostalgia. His work is to help the spectator re-evaluate the power of the static image, its ability to make reference to our histories and its power to reinvoke our thoughts and our participation through small acts of attention. ^{6}From Proverbial In(ter)vention Catalogue 2009

== Exhibitions ==
=== Solo exhibitions ===
- 2017 – '8 Stories', Galerie Mukadam, Berlin, Germany
- 2014 – 'Parallax Views', Tao Art Gallery, Mumbai
- 2013 – 'The Golden Ear- A Tribute to Wagner', Seminarhaus Bayreuth, Deutsche Oper, Berlin & Kameha, Frankfurt
- 2013 – 'Infinite Range of Responses to Time', Galerie Sogan & Art, Singapore
- 2011 – Discourse of prismatic truths at Pavillon du Centanarie/Arcelor Mittal, Luxembourg.
- 2010 – Allegories of talking road at Galerie Sylvia Bernhardt, Germany.
- 2010 – Crimson Art Gallery, Bangalore.
- 2009 – Proverbial In(ter)vention, NUS Museum, Singapore.
- 2004 – Refraction of ideas, Artists Centre, Mumbai.
- 2000 – Souvenirs from journeys within solo exhibition at Kala Academy, Panaji.
- 1999 – Exhibition at Jehangir Art Gallery, Mumbai.
- 1998 – Memoirs of the unreal city and findings through journeys. Chavan Art Gallery, Mumbai.

== Awards ==
- 2017 – 'MVUVM Award' for Achievement in Field of Art.
- 2003 – The Harmony Emerging Artist Award presented by the Reliance Art Foundation.
- 2002 – The Bendre Husain Scholarship.
- 2002 – Maharashtra State Art Award, Jehangir Art Gallery, Mumbai.
- 2001 – National Scholarship by Lalit Kala Akademi, New Delhi.
- 1999 – The Governors Prize at the Exhibition of The Bombay Art Society.
- 1996 – Best Painting Award at The Art Society of India Exhibition.
- 1994,96 – Merit Certificate the Exhibition of The Bombay Art Society.
