= Walter Saldanha =

Indian businessman (1931–2024)

Walter Saldanha (31 October 1931 – 28 December 2024) was an Indian businessman and co-founder, with Brendan Pereira, of Chaitra Advertising Private Limited (now Leo Burnett). He was latterly the Chairman-Cum-Managing Director of Chaitra Holdings Private Limited. In 2001, he founded the Asian Institute of Communication and Research, better known as AICAR Business School.

== Life and career ==
Saldanha started his career as a typist in 1947, a few months short of his 16th birthday. In 1951 he joined the advertising agency J Walter Thompson (JWT India) as secretary to a senior account executive. He worked with JWT in various roles, he was also instrumental in setting up JWT operations in Sri Lanka. In 1972, he and Creative Director Brendan Pereira, left Aiyar Advertising and Marketing Ltd, to set up their own advertising agency, Chaitra Advertising. By 1983 Chaitra Advertising was among the top 10 advertising agencies in India. In the late 1990s Chaitra Advertising was acquired by Leo Burnett, one of the leading advertising agencies in the world. In 2001 he set up the Asian Institute of Communication & Research, better known as AICAR Business School. He was also a member of the board of directors for Aptech Limited.

Saldanha was also the Hon. Treasurer of the Society for Eradication of Leprosy, he was also a Trustee of the Sangeet Abhinay Academy, an organisation devoted to the development of musical talent and the Shanti Avedna Sadan (a home for terminally ill cancer patients). He was also Chairman of Slum Rehabilitation Society.

Saldahna died on 28 December 2024, at the age of 93.

== Awards ==
In 2000, Saldanha was awarded for his outstanding contribution to advertising by the Advertising Agencies Association of India (AAAI).
