= Rajiv Rao =

India Creative Director

- Born: India
- Occupations: National Creative Director, Ogilvy & Mather
- Website: www.ogilvy.com

Rajiv Rao is National Creative Director of Ogilvy & Mather, responsible for the ZooZoo and Pug Advertising Campaigns of Vodafone. He also did many other creative campaigns. He had won several medals at Cannes, One Show, Clio, Ad fest, CA, Media Spikes and London International Awards for his Creative work. He worked on Vodafone/Orange in India has won ‘Campaign of the year’, 4 times in a row. The World Brand Congress also conferred Mr. Rajiv Rao with the Creative Person of the year award in 2009. He had also been invited to be a part of the jury at the London International Awards and Ad fest Asia Pacific. According to Economic Times India, he has been in the list of top Creative Directors of the country for the last 5 years.

== Early life and education ==
He attended Sir J.J.Institute of Applied Arts in Mumbai He completed Applied Arts which is for advertising but he didn’t have clear plans at that time. He had seen a lot of ads and was fascinated to see the world of advertising.

== Career ==
Finally he joined an advertising agency after he finished studies. He started working in advertising field and figured that it’s a fun job and he would say that working really made him realise that advertising was the right thing for him. After his 6 years journey in advertising industry, he finally landed in Ogilvy India in 1999 as a creative group head.

== Awards and honors ==
Year of award or honor	Name of award or honor	Awarding organization
2002	Clio awards 2002	Clio awards
