= Govind Solegaonkar =

Indian artist (1912–1986)

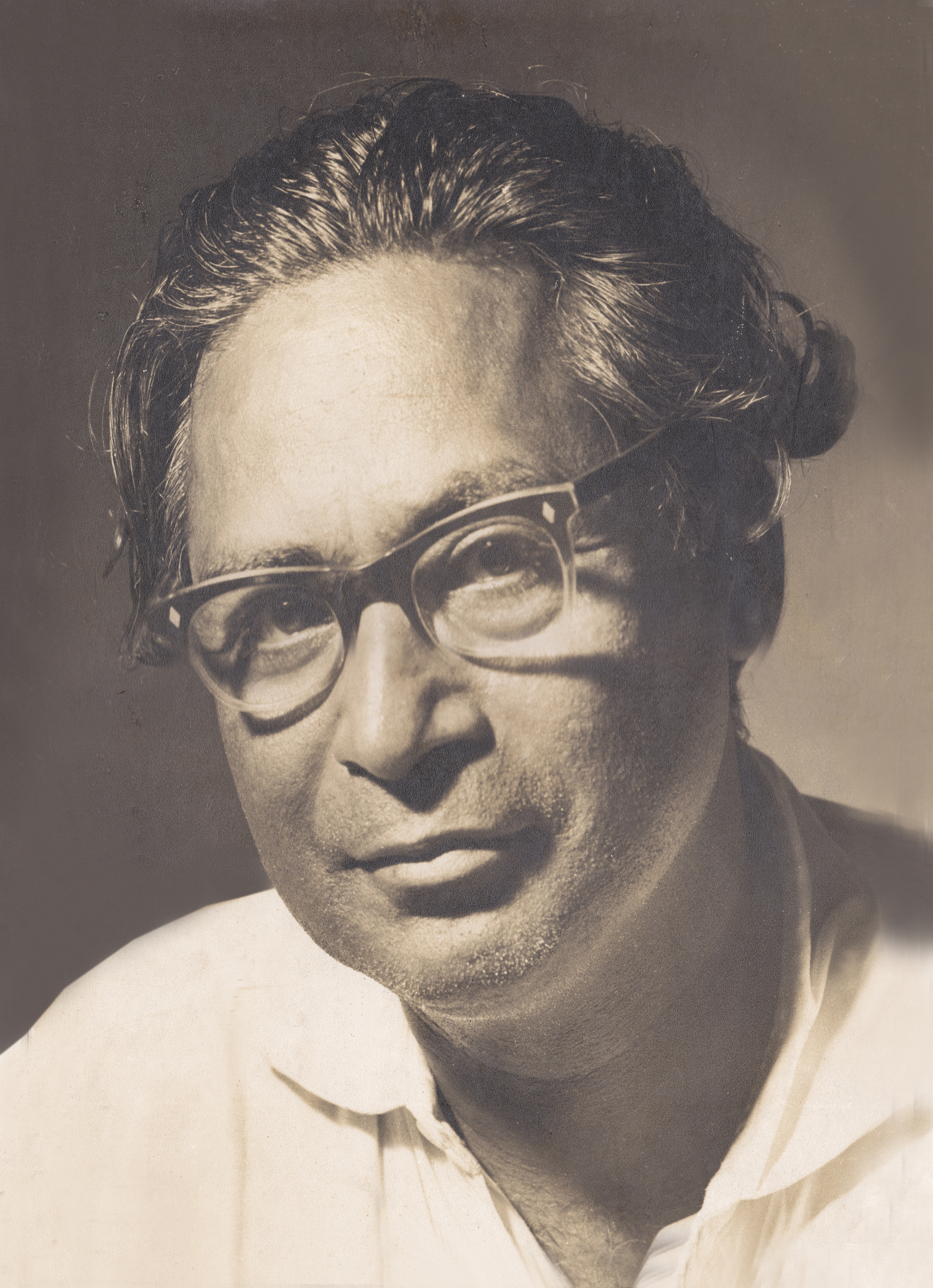

Govind Madhav Solegaonkar (1912–1986) was an Indian artist who created works on murals, portraits, landscapes and abstract paintings.

== Early life ==
Govind Solegaonkar was born in 1912 at Sehore in British India. He was introduced to art at a very early age, receiving his initial lessons at home from his father who was a student of Sir J.J. School and was part of Ajanta copying team from J.J. School. While schooling, G. M. Solegaonkar simultaneously took training in drawing, painting at "Devlalikar Institute" in Indore. Devlalikar too was a past student of Sir J.J. School of Art. Thus, the academic influence of J.J. School started molding G. M. Solegaonkar much before he himself joined the school.

In 1928 an important incident took place which exerted an indirect influence of Revivalists Movement on his mind. ’’Pravasi Vanga Sahitya Sammelan" was held in Indore. On this occasion, an exhibition of the paintings from all over India was held. G.M. Solegaonkar participated in it and was felicitated with silver medal at the hands of Lady Dobson, member of London Royal Academy. The program of the Parishad included among other items the lectures by Dr. Cousins, on Indian Art. In his lectures, he gave references from Havell's book, "The Ideals of Indian Art". The lectures inspired him arousing curiosity about the qualities of Indian Art and its philosophical background; which he pursued all through.

He had excelled in Elementary & Intermediate Drawing examinations. During this period he started painting portraits. The British soldiers at Mhow Cantonment wanted to send their small portraits to their beloved and were very happy to get their miniature portraits done by G.M. Solegaonkar.

He joined Sir J.J. School of Art - Mumbai, in 1930, for Diploma in painting & completed it in 1933 in first class, winning many awards. He was appointed a Fellow at Sir J.J. School of Art – Mumbai for 1935–1936 in Mural Department.

== Career ==
While a student his award-winning painting "Love Pilgrimage" was exhibited in an exhibition at the Burlington Gallery, London.

In 1935, he won the Gold medal of Bombay Art Society for his painting ‘Mahiyari’ Presently the painting is with Chhatrapati Shivaji Maharaj Vastu Sangrahalaya - Mumbai (then Prince of Wales Museum). The same was on display in recent exhibition organised as tribute to G. Solomon, Dean Sir J.J. School of Art. (http://www.csmvs.in/about-us/press-room/press-release/210-pravaha.html)

For next twenty years, he continued to receive many awards, prizes and trophies from Simla Fine Art Society, Art Society of India, Bombay Art Society and in various Art exhibitions in India. During an exhibition at Fine art Society, Simla. His poster painting 'Ajanta Frescos' was awarded a special prize by the publicity department of Indian Railways.

Post independence, a planning committee was formed to draw detailed plan to decorate the Parliament House of India, with paintings of eminent artists depicting great moments in the history of this country. G. M. Solegaonkar was selected to create a panel painting. His mural titled Bhojshala continues to be displayed at the Indian Parliament House.

He held his solo exhibitions in Jehangir Art Gallery in 1954, 1957 and 1958.

G. M. Solegaonkar visited Europe in 1958 particularly England, Belgium, Holland. He spent about two years there, studying the paintings and sculptures by visiting various galleries and exhibitions. His work during this period contained numerous paintings in his own style and predominantly with various Indian subjects. He held many exhibitions in Europe, with three of them being held in Belgium.

On return from Europe visit, he served Art Society of India as President in 1962.

He held his exhibitions in Jehangir Art Gallery in 1962 and in Taj Art Gallery in 1970.

He spent years researching the master key and technique deployed in paintings at Ajanta and Bagh Caves . As he could see that this invaluable cultural heritage was showing signs of getting ravaged by onslaught of time, he had a strong desire to make this treasure available for the future generations. With this background he had planned a detailed scheme, of having a replica of Ajanta Caves. The scheme would provide training to the art-students as well as patronage to painters. He had commenced corresponding with Government authorities. The then Education Minister Madhukarrao Chaudhary and Defense Minister Yashwantrao Chavan were favorably inclined towards the scheme and had indicated their consent. Unfortunately, due to paucity of funds with Maharashtra Government, this scheme could not see the light of the day.

In July 1971, an exhibition of 40 of his paintings was held in India House, London.

He continued to wield his brush and pallet till the day he died on 5 January 1986.

Subsequently, his works have been auctioned by several art auction houses such as Christie's and SaffronArt.

== Style ==
The following paragraph taken from his diary, sets the tone for his art journey:

"India had art of long standing. The artistic value need not necessarily depend upon fulfilling the standards set by the latest fashion or theory or values current in Europe.

Artistic activity decreased alongside changes in freedom and culture. England introduced European art ideals, methods, and values to India. European culture brought concepts such as individual and collective freedom, which contributed to general progress.

Let us not be servile imitators of the dead past or living present of Europe. Let us find out whether we have anything to give – contribute. Let us free ourselves from the false notion that is holding on to Indian technique, period or school. This is the way to express the soul of India in art forms."

Similarly following quote from his diary defines his approach to technique and style:

"Mastery over technique gives discipline to the artist. The discipline, the control of the material which the mastery over the technique gives is very precious.....

Mere technique is not art. The artist must learn and then forget the technique."

Throughout his life he experimented with different styles. He tried various types of subjects from figurative compositions in Indian decorative style, genre, portraits, still-life, outdoor scenes - landscapes, abstract as well as non-objective paintings. All of these showed a continuous handling of color and forms with new experiments.

Style in The Early Period

He started with portraits, even before formal training in J. J. School of Art. He was successful in bringing perfect likeness and his portraits were known for his masterly treatment in realistic rendering. In J.J. School, he was introduced to the painting style based on academic realism. All the same, there was a deep influence of the great frescoes of Ajanta and especially Bagh Caves on his mind from very early age when he was in Indore. Influenced by Havell's book & Dean Gladston Solomon he ardently followed Bombay Revivalism and his work represented the Indian art. The fascination about Indian art and its decorative style was combined with the academic training of Bombay School.

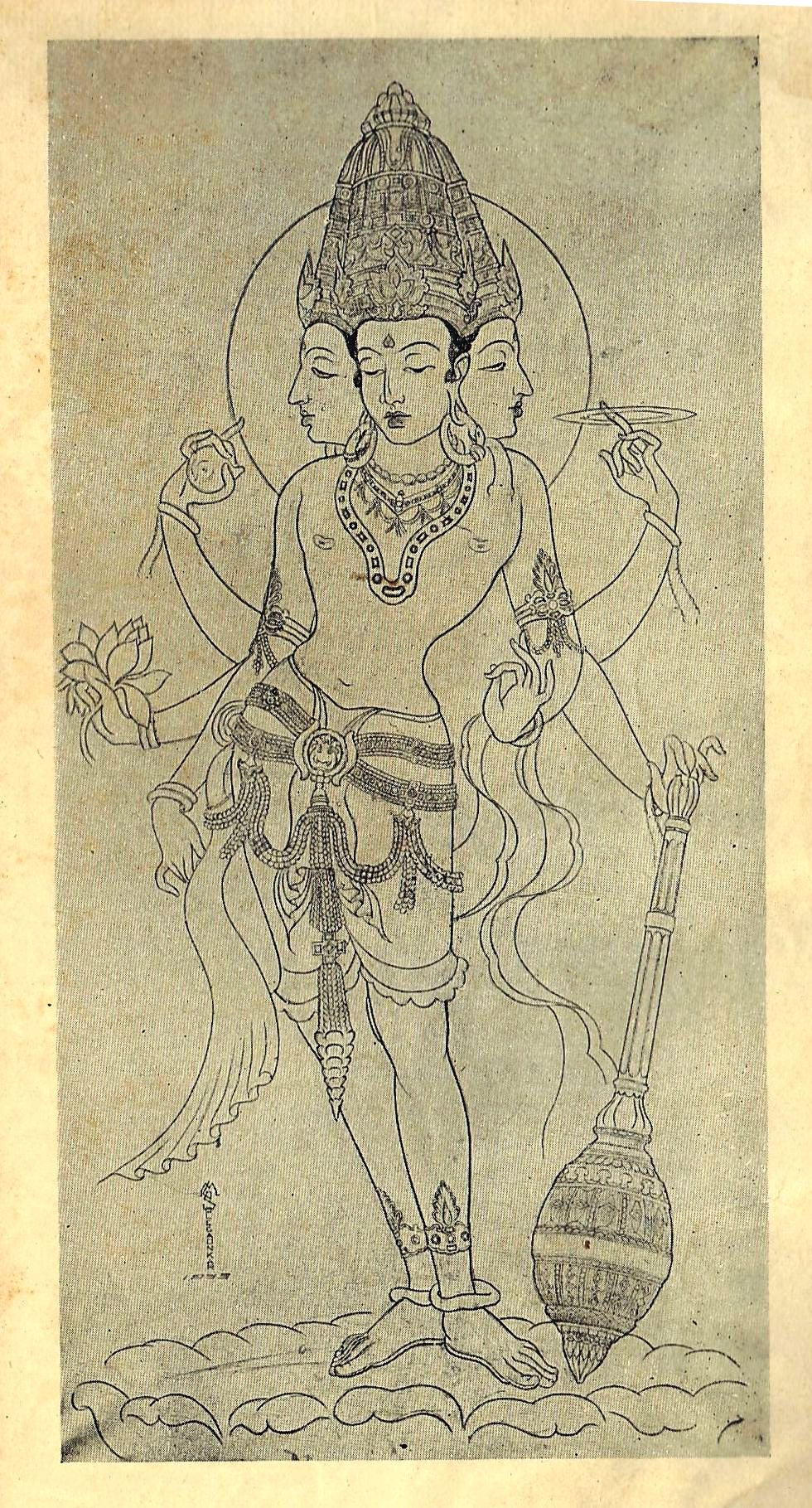

Iconographic paintings - ' Dattatreya', 'Trimurti', 'Samudra Manthan'

These paintings illustrate his mastery over line acquired by his study of Frescos Art. These were an example of wall decoration on traditional lines.

He experimented illusionistic paintings in the academic style and made compositions in Indian decorative style. His work in the early period of his career was earmarked as replete with Iconographic paintings making subtle use of different styles. He belonged to the transition period. He was known to be the first modern artist from J.J. School of Art.

Given below are the illustrations of expert use of different styles as seen in some of his prize winning work during the early period –

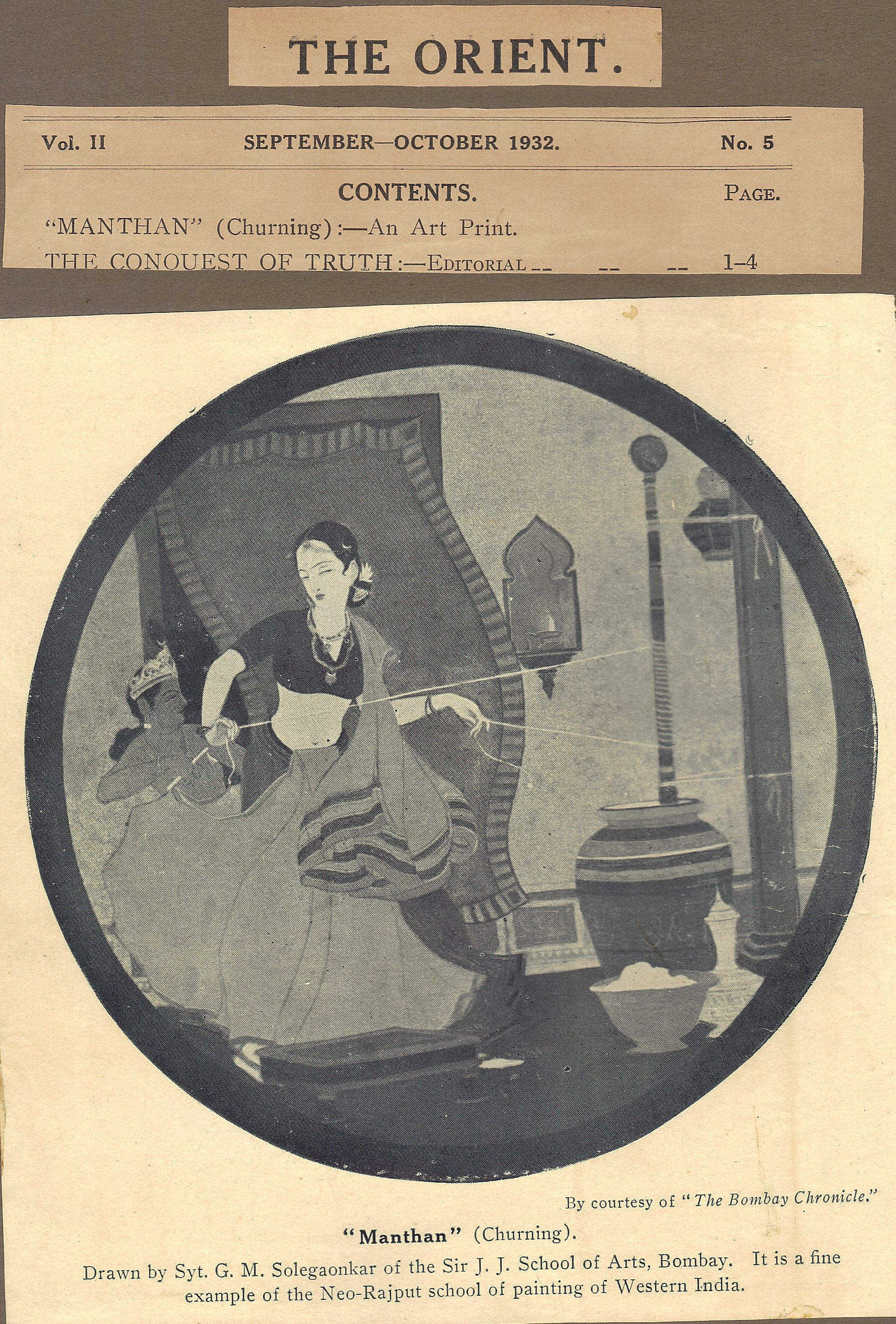

‘Dadhi Manthan’ (Churning) - In the art world this work was distinctively noticed then for its theme. It depicted artistically the rhythmic movement of churning and included minute details such as the flowing movement of a background curtain etc. The color combination showed traces of Neo Rajput style.

‘Love Pilgrimage’ was a large decorative panel of the divine couple - Shiva & his consort Uma and captured their lilting movement. This painting using hastmudra – hand gestures influenced by Ajanta frescos was considered an example of obsession with the Indian decorative style and ingenious mannerism. It recorded a new enterprise in decorative line and color and won the ‘Nizam silver medal’ for best work by student of any art school in India in Simla Fine Art exhibition. This painting was much appreciated for its line work reminding iconography of ancient Indian Art on the backdrop of Ancient Buddhist Art. It was eventually selected for the exhibition of Modern Indian Art arranged by the Indian Society of London at the New Burlington Galleries (1934).

Chandra Aradhana’ had semblance of Mughal style.

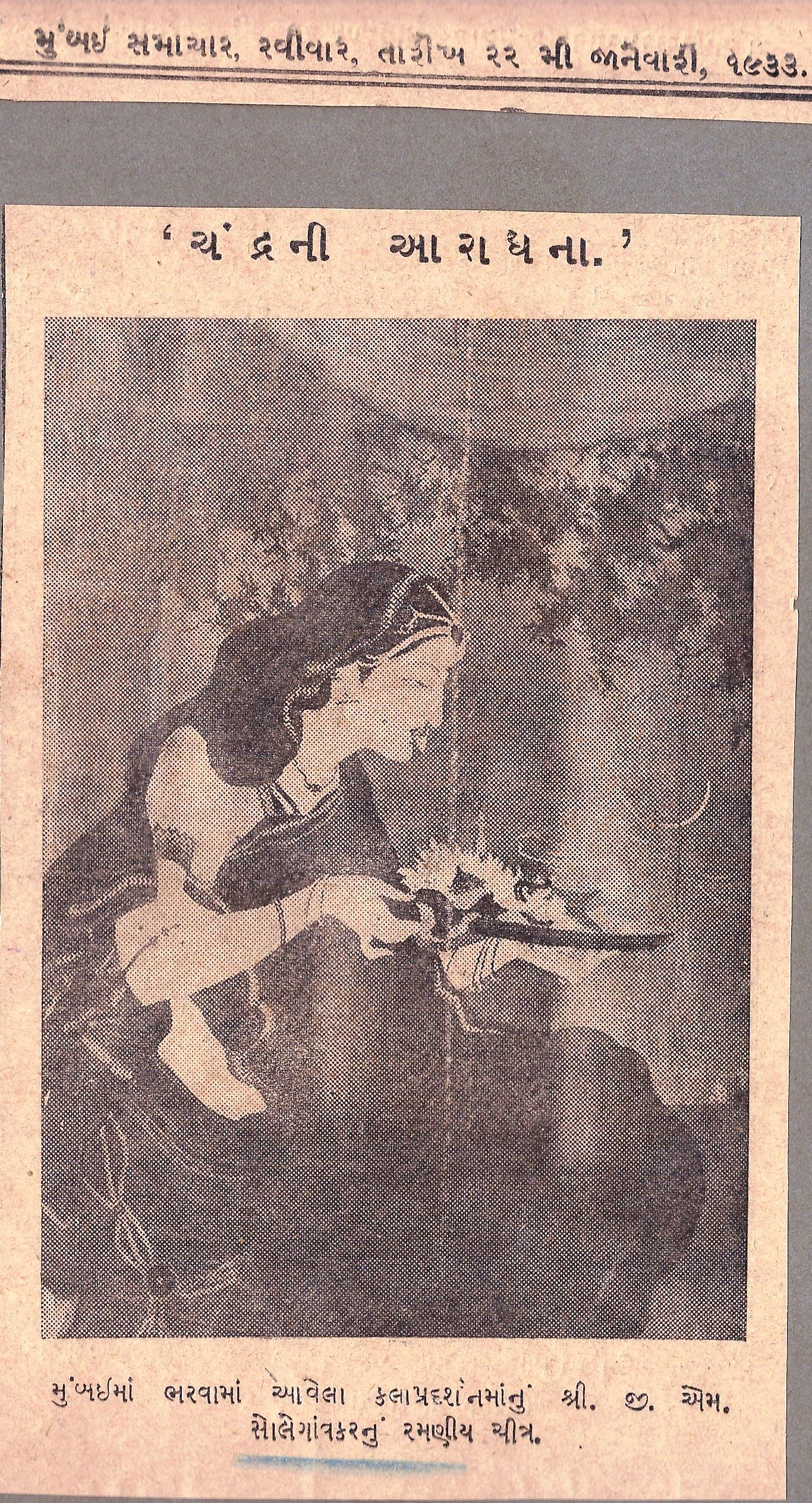

Mahiyari (1935 - Gold medal winning painting) This painting noted for its originality was a strikingly successful attempt to present a truly Indian subject using western style of painting. It was the first time that an effort was made to use Cubism which was an emerging French school of painting then. The play of light and shadow on Mahiyari's multi coloured costume and on the sunlit buildings, use of western proportionality, colour scheme in Rajput style made this an aesthetic and striking art work. Critic Karl Khandalawala has noted - 'This painting presented an excellent illustration of how certain principles of Modern French Art can with great advantage be employed by the Indian artist without losing his individuality or becoming an imitator.'

This artist was not tied down to the rigid principles of reality, which was the chief factor of the paintings of the Bombay school. After realistic phase, he tried to use bold impressionistic strokes. He simplified the forms by omitting unnecessary details - thus deviating from the traditional style executed with microscopic details. He used broad, bold and confident brush-strokes in the paintings. His handling showed rapidity, boldness and precision. For this purpose sometimes he used even flat tones and simplified forms. Through all his work he continued experimenting with feeling of space, arrangement of forms, aspects of light & color eventually to create a good design while keeping the effect of space intact. His efforts are revealed in his line, in individual figures or in the overall design. The experiments with space involved the use of unusual views and levels. By training and as his core strength he was a muralist. In the paintings or line art, irrespective of size or color, distinctive features of mural paintings can be noticed. His work exhibits mastery over line and its spontaneity created a sense of volume in his drawing. His paintings show a powerful color-sense and a decorative quality.

== Abstract Paintings ==
In his work there is integration between the past and the present. His work displays vital interest in Present - modern trends of the contemporary world, sustained with deeply rooted understanding of the past heritage - inspirations from Frescos of Ajanta & Bagh. He reformed his original style taking cognizance of new references and new directions. Thus started his foray into abstract paintings.

Exposure to modern works of art from the west left impressionistic influences with novel modes in his work. He achieved effects of vast space and good design through interesting arrangement of simplified forms and color orchestration. With his urge for innovation, he continued experimenting in treatment of form & arrangements.

His approach to abstract art was deep rooted in a stylized realism. He adopted specialties of modern paintings to create visual art. His work was marked with his perspective, fine sense of pattern and geometrical rhythm.Landscapes

Fascinated by the beauty of nature, he tried to explore it through his landscapes throughout his life. His landscapes showed a new view to reveal the beauty of nature. Most of his landscapes show the panoramic view revealing the vast space. His landscapes show simplified forms and sure, bold brush-strokes together with pleasant color-schemes derived from natural pigments. He chiefly experimented in aspects of light, space and color. Though his training emphasized on academic realism, his technique of landscape painting showed the influence of the Impressionism and Post-impressionism. Color

His approach to color was scientific and his color-scheme shows strength and vitality. Limited palette and skillful use of greys derived from different colors was the result of inspiration from the ancient muralists of India. Particularly the cave paintings of Bagh provided inspiration for his experiments in tempera colors. He prepared his own colors from the pigments. It is for this reason his color scheme had become a distinguishing feature of his art work. He used water colors in opaque manner (gouache technique) like the Indian miniature painters. He used indigenous earth colors for chromatic luminosity.

== Paintings ==
Some paintings by Mr Solegaonkar:

Paintings by Mr G. M. Solegaonkar

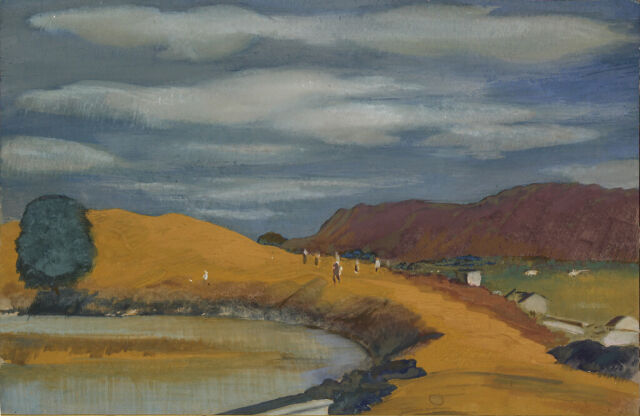

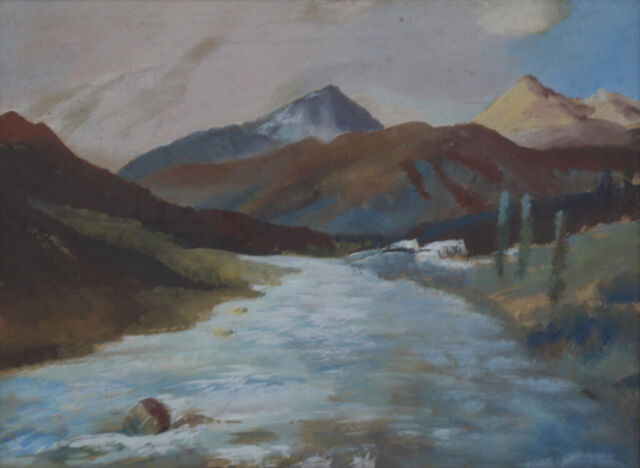

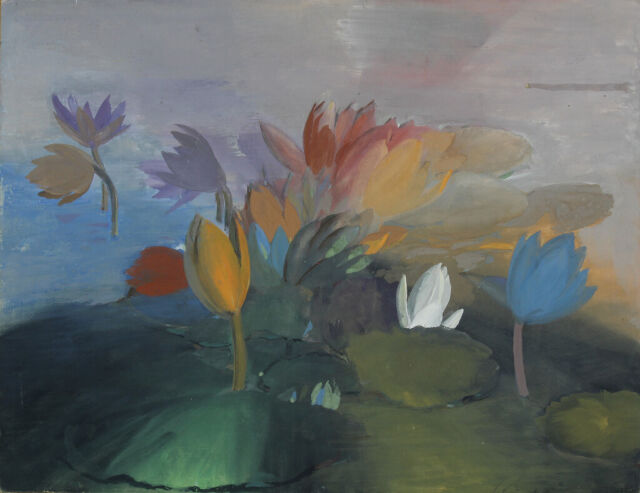

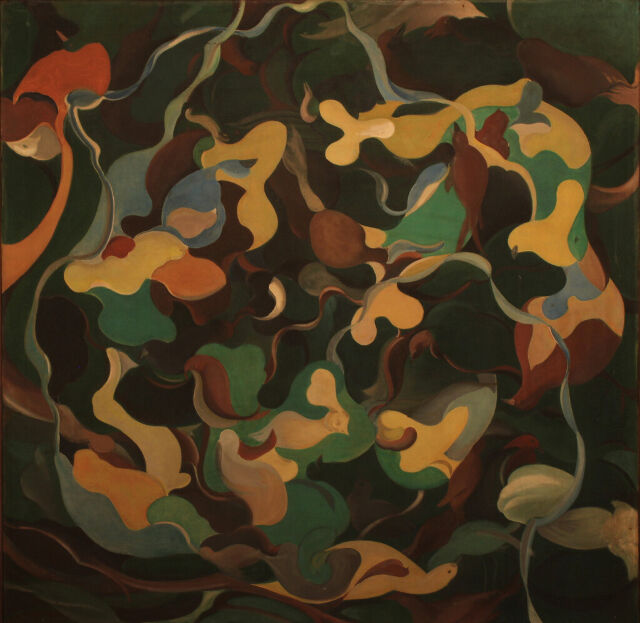

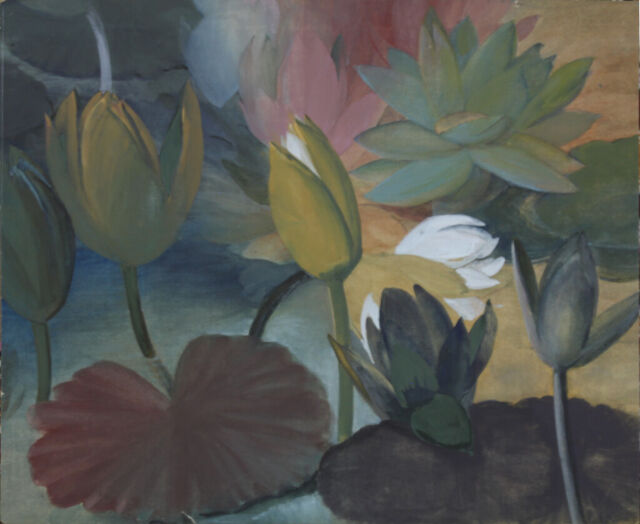

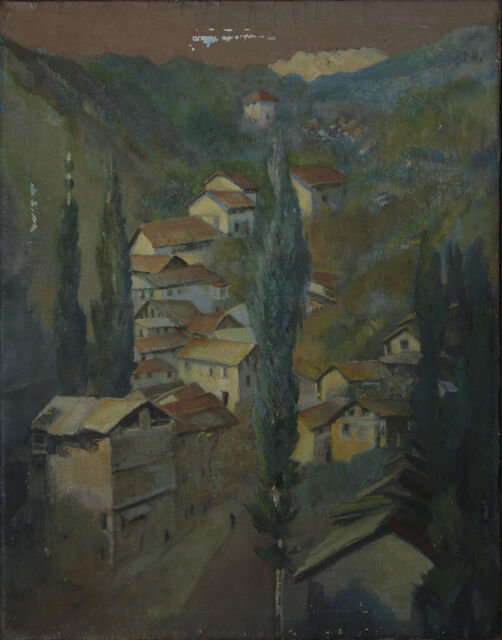

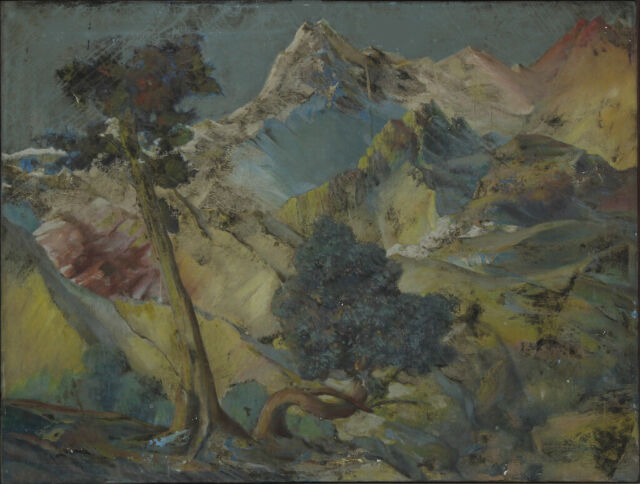

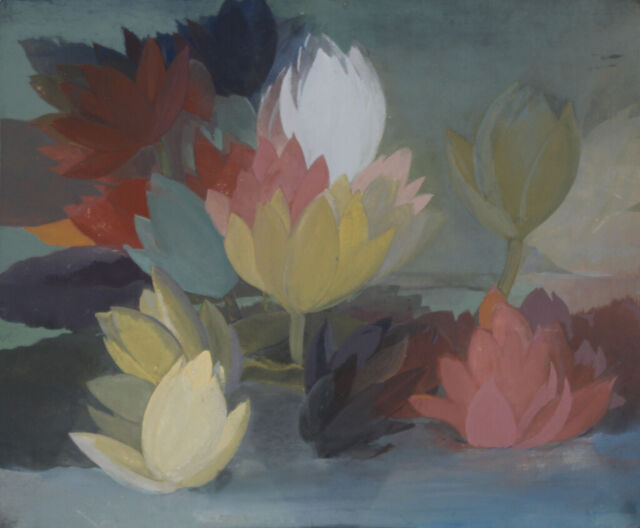

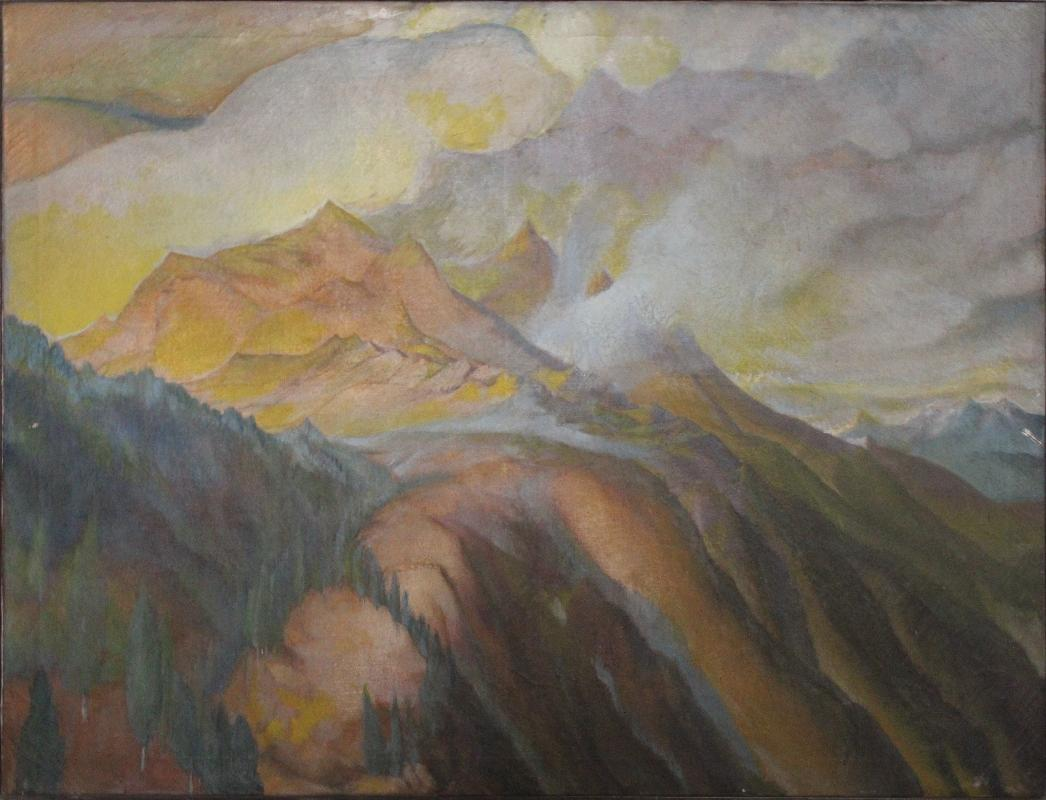

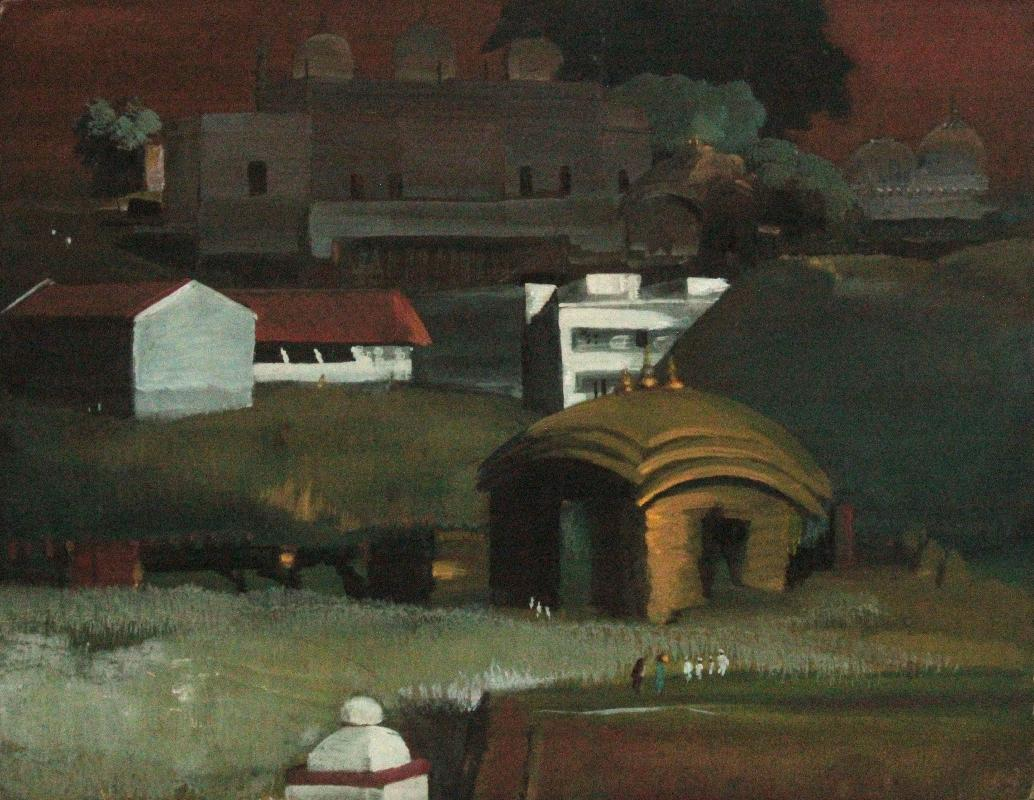

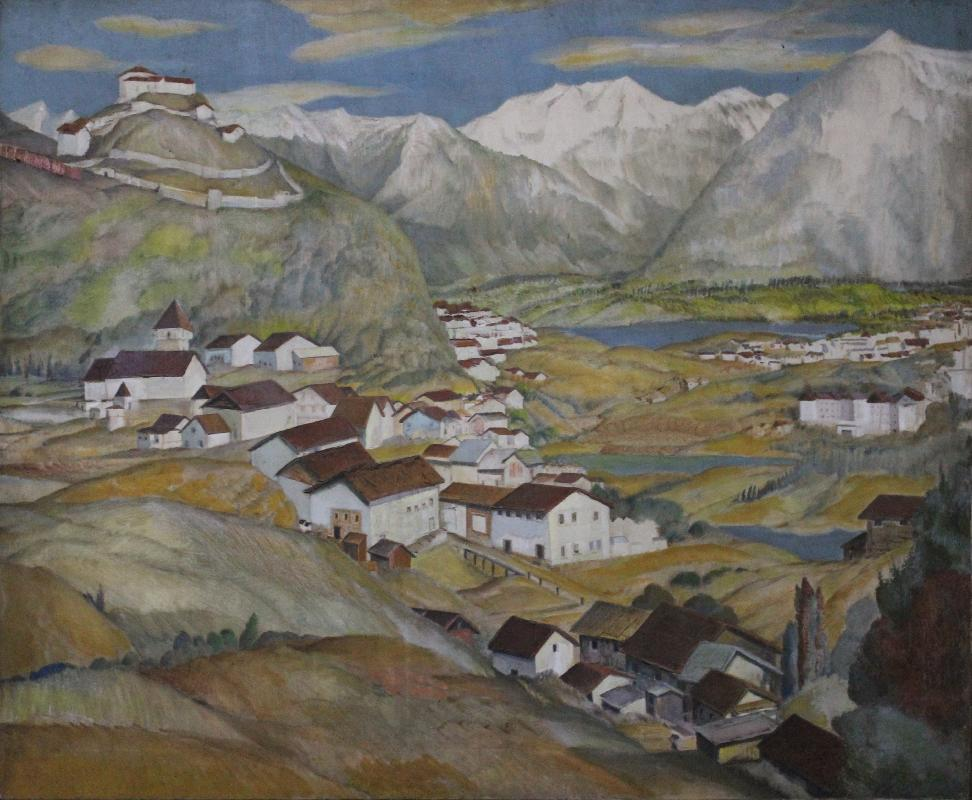

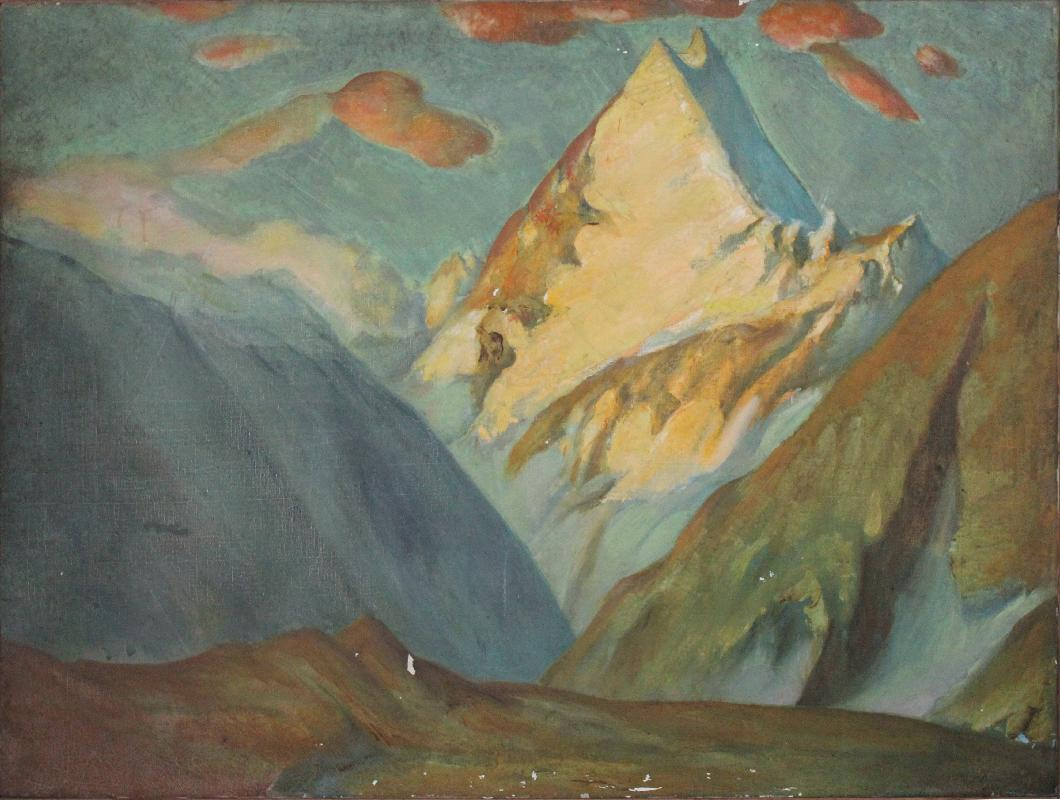

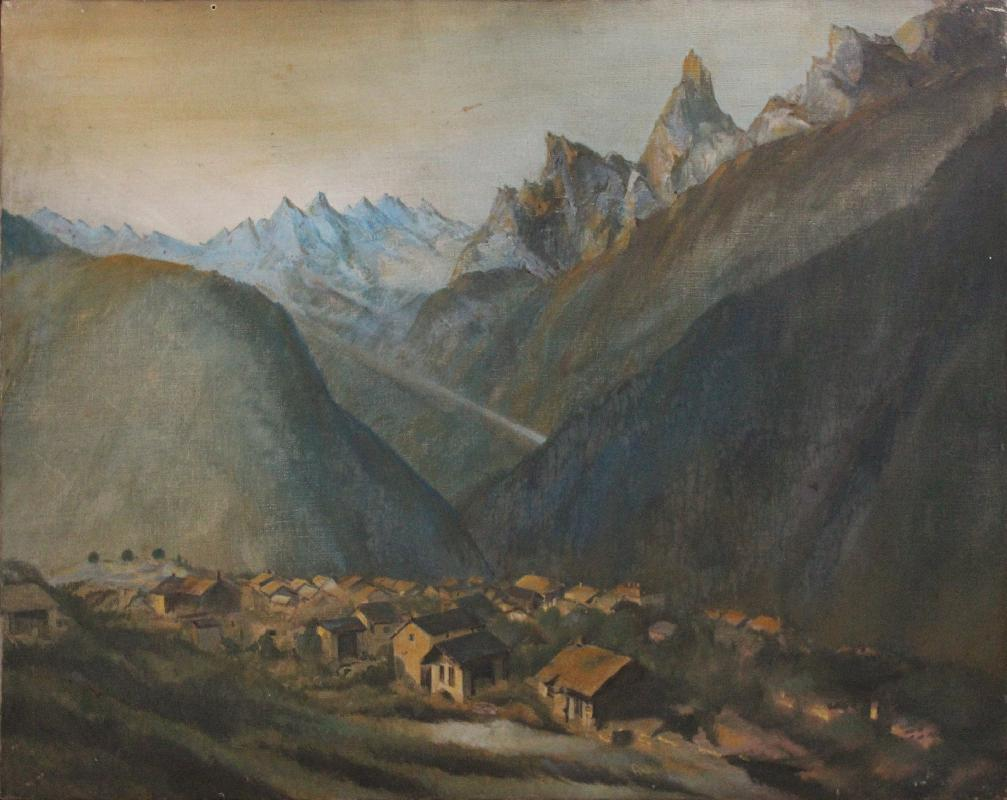

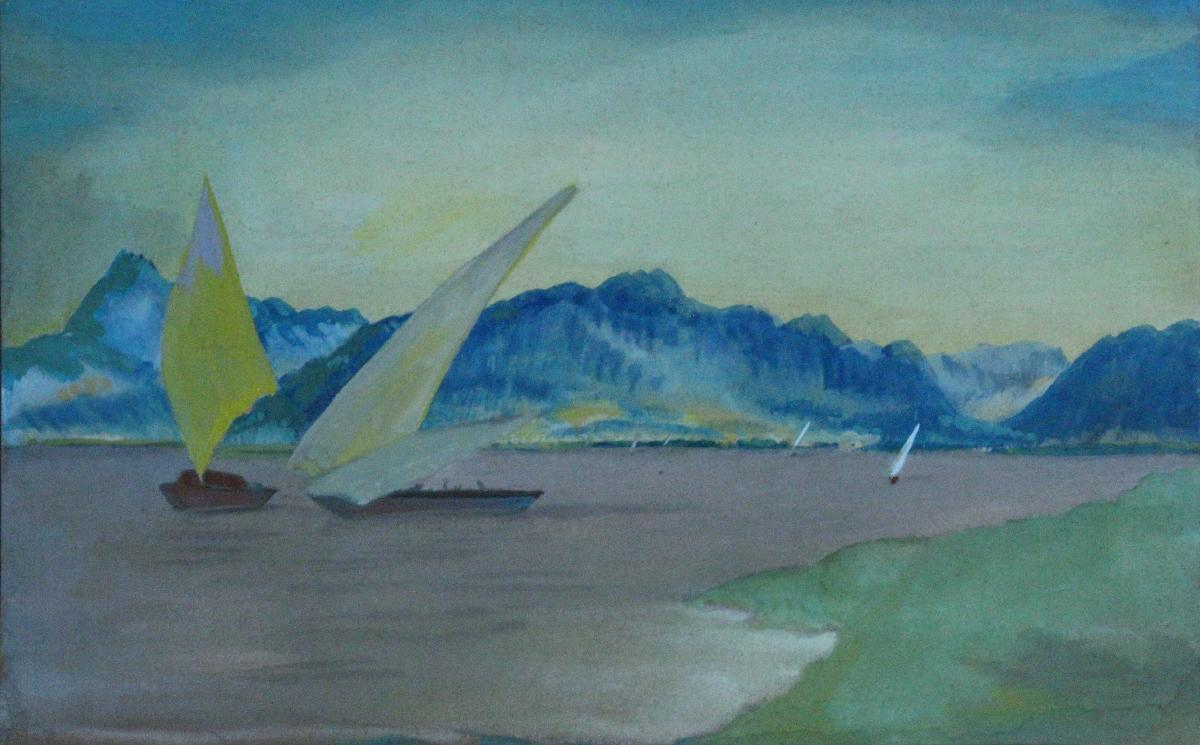

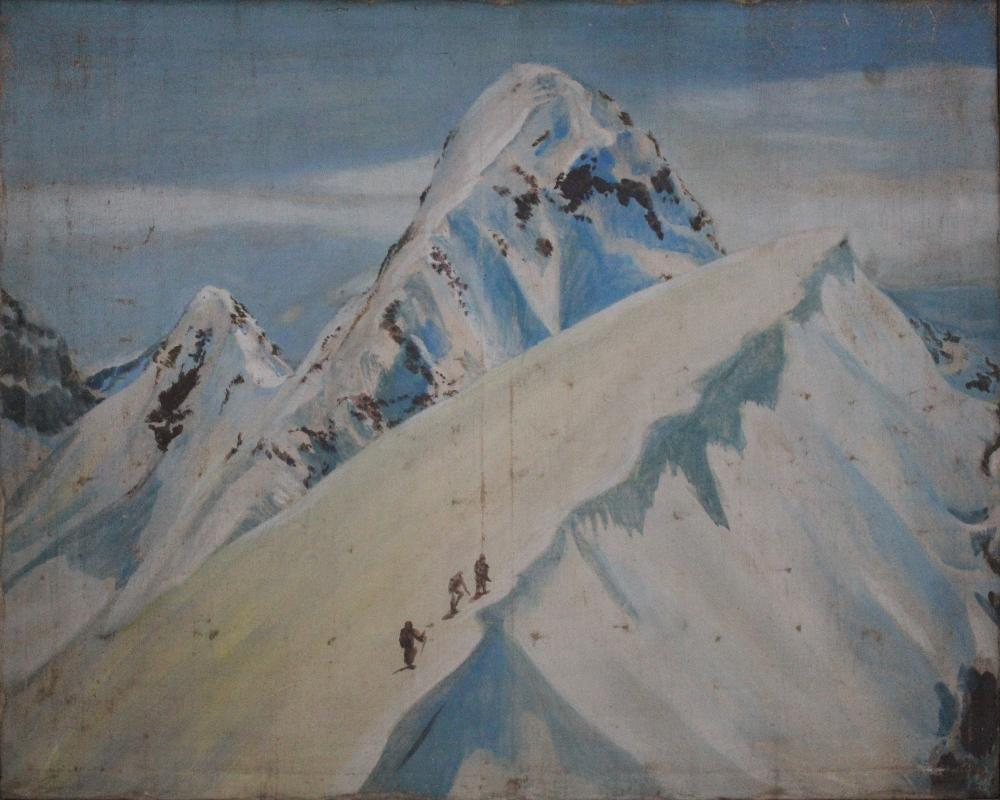

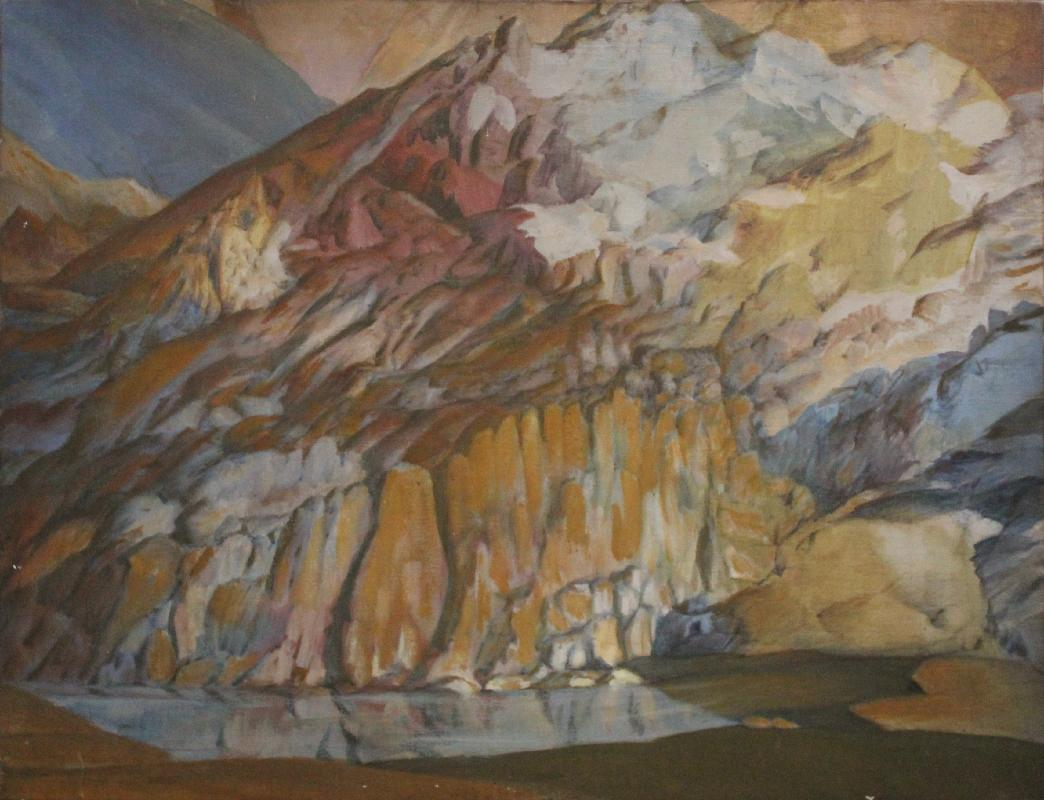

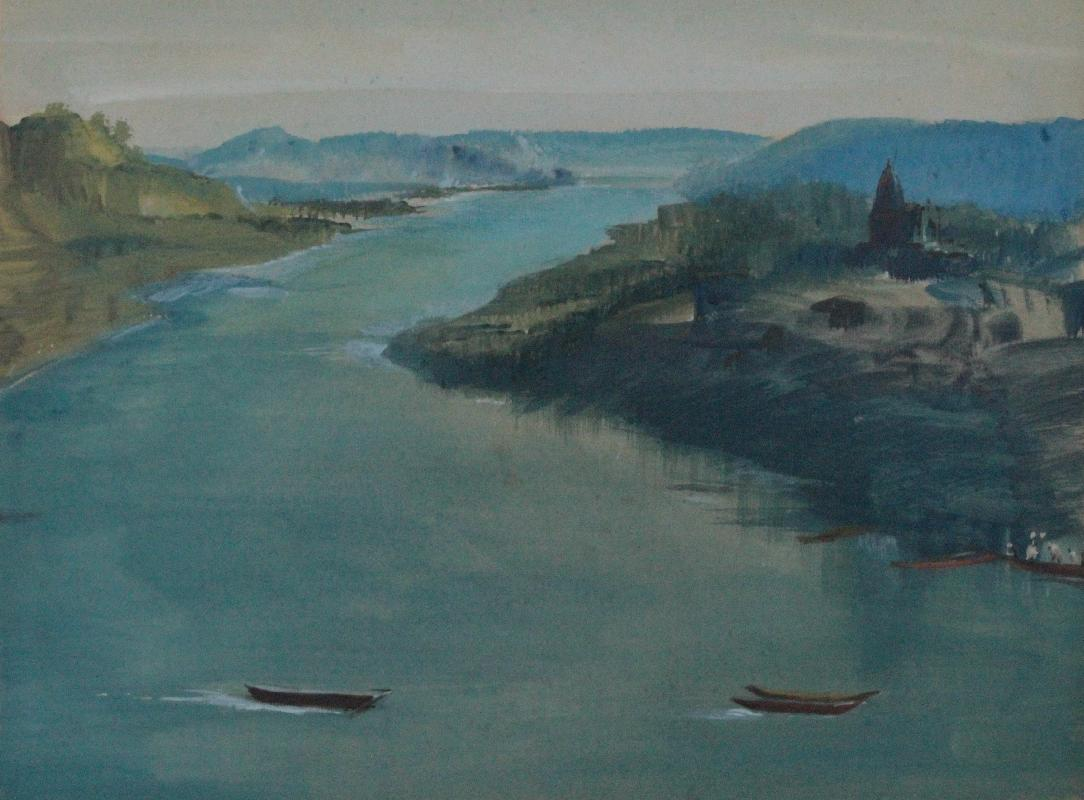

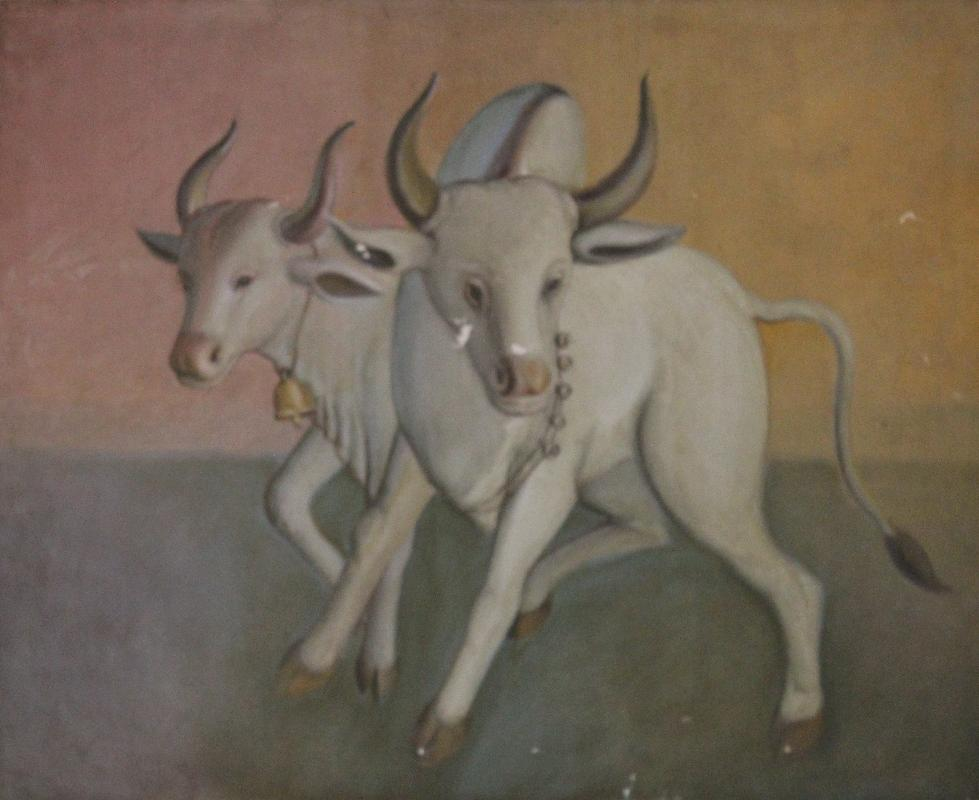

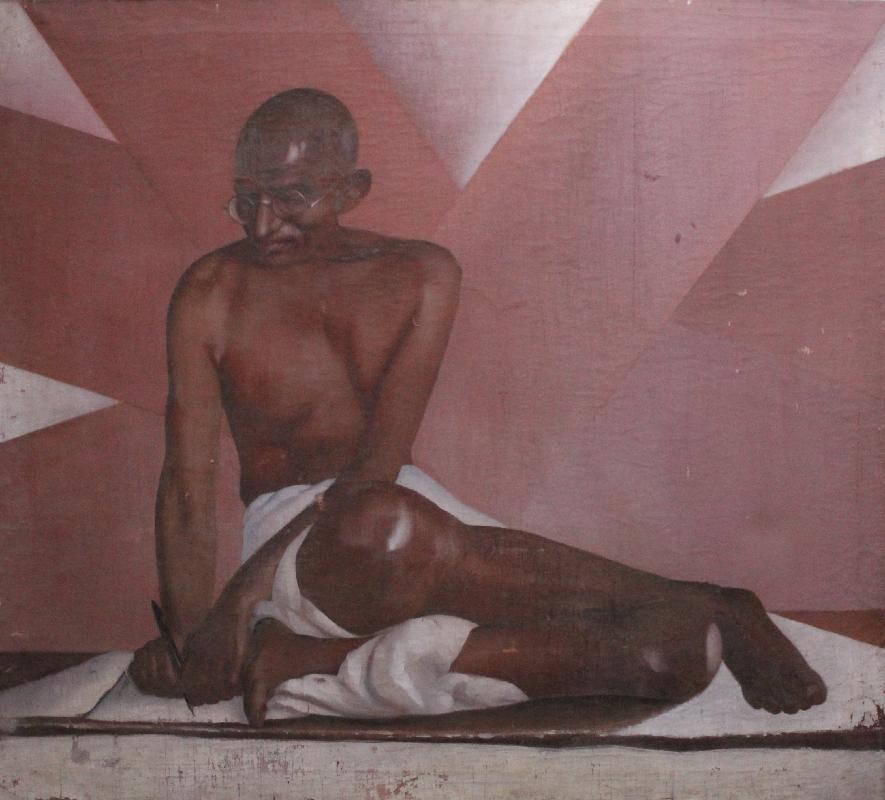

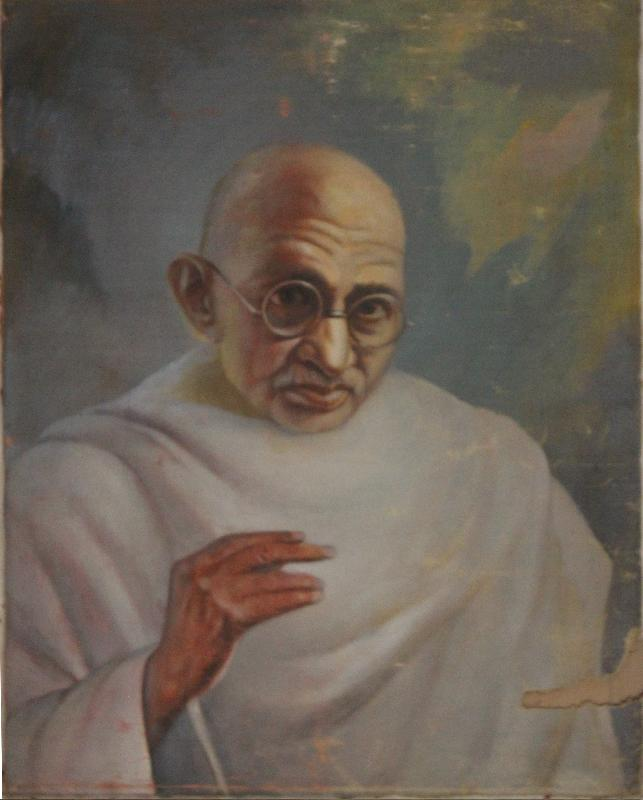

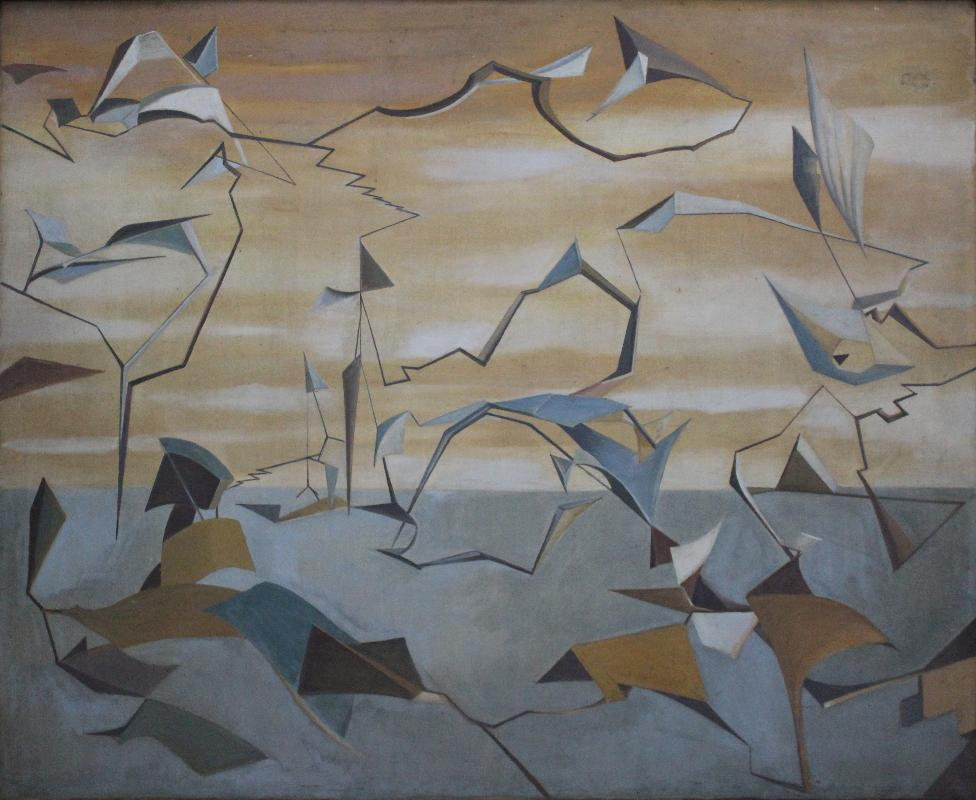

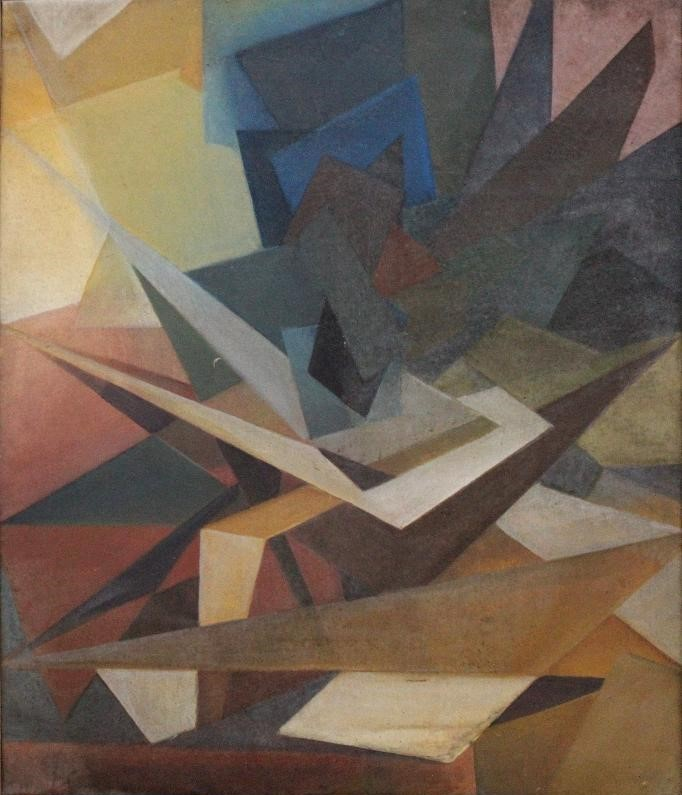

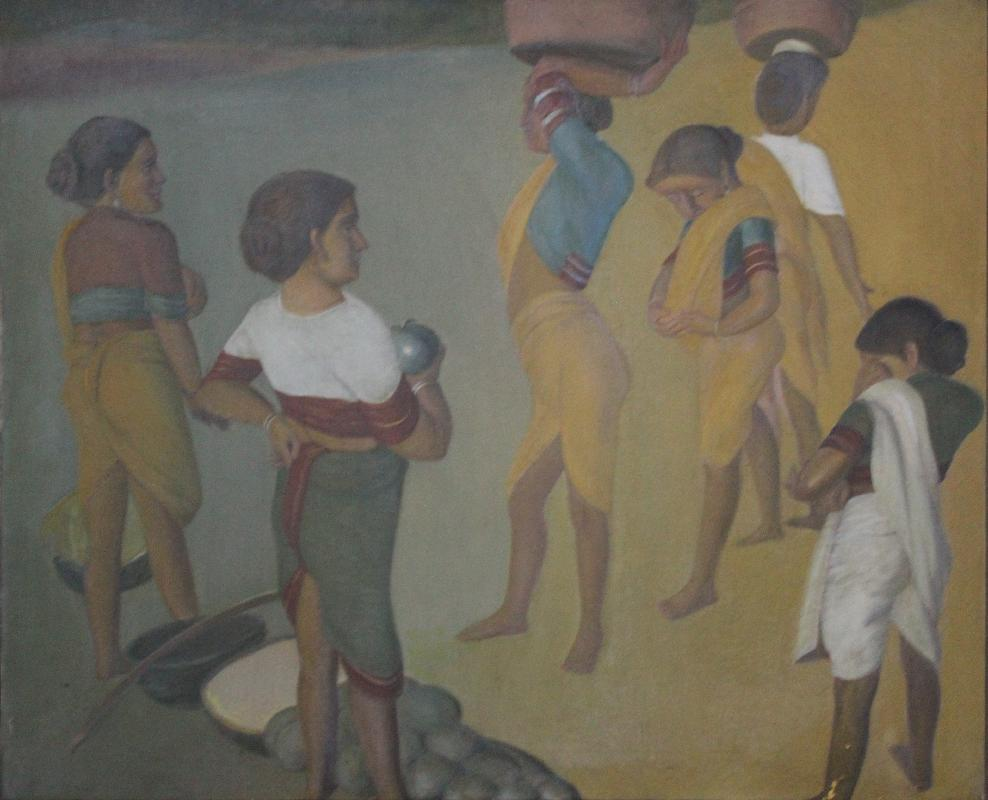

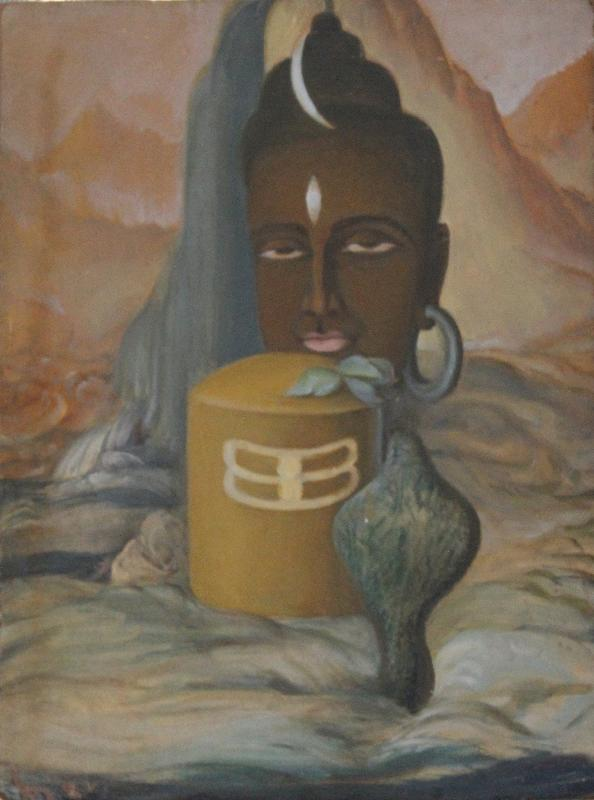

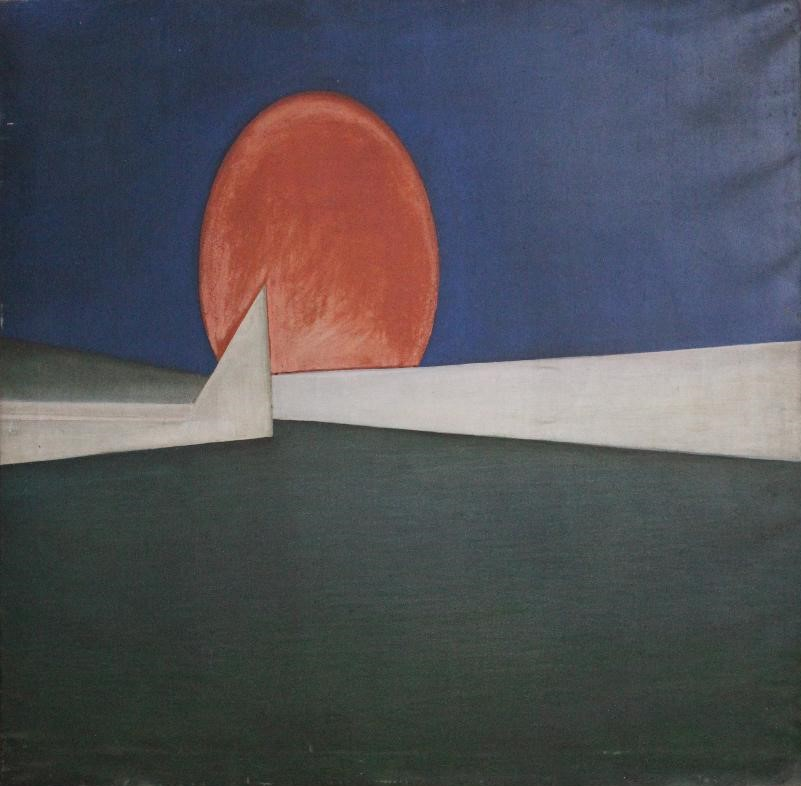

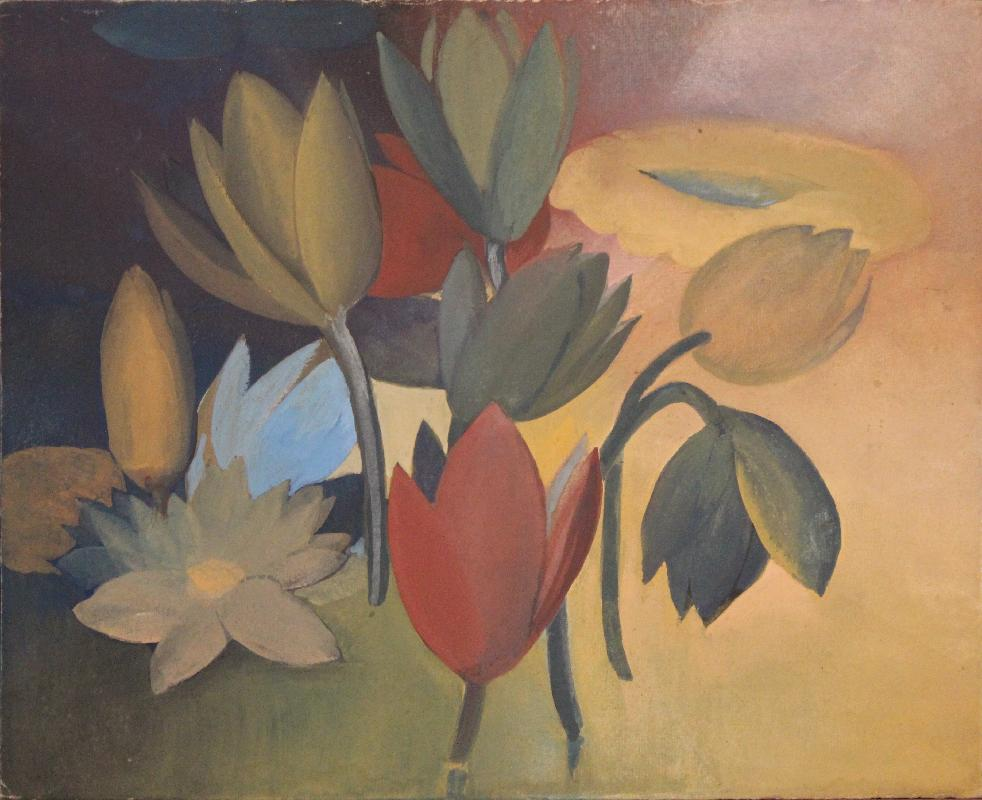

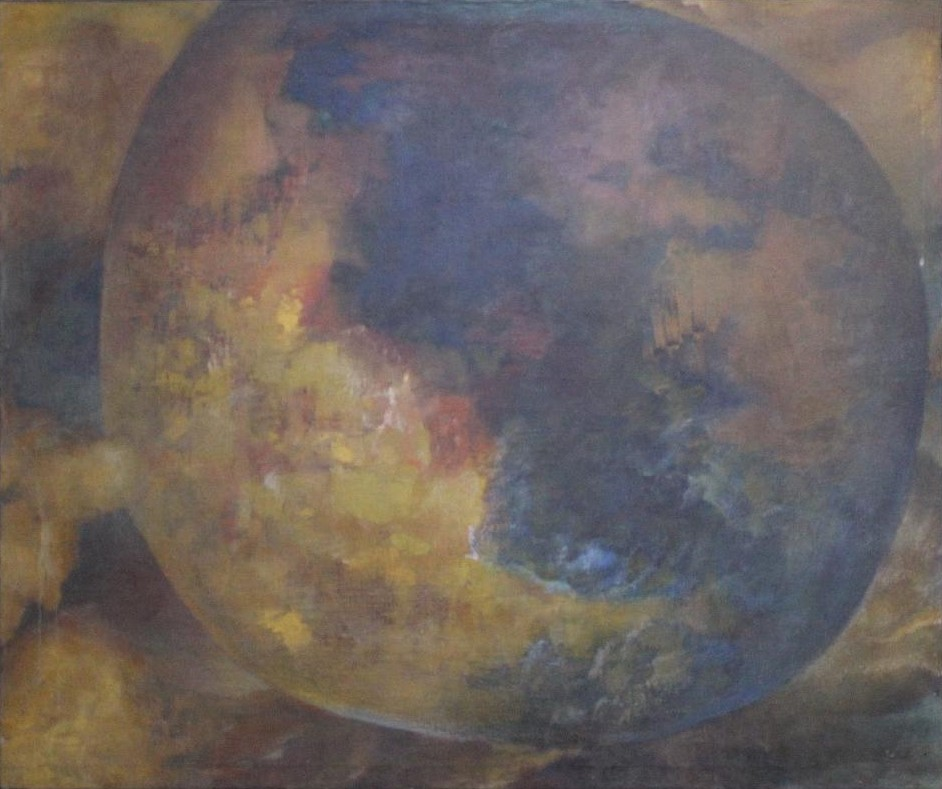

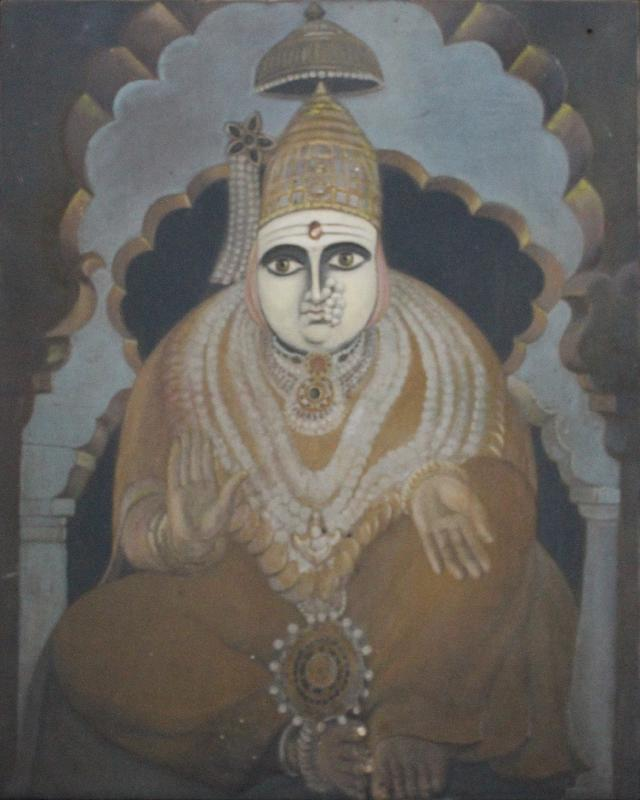

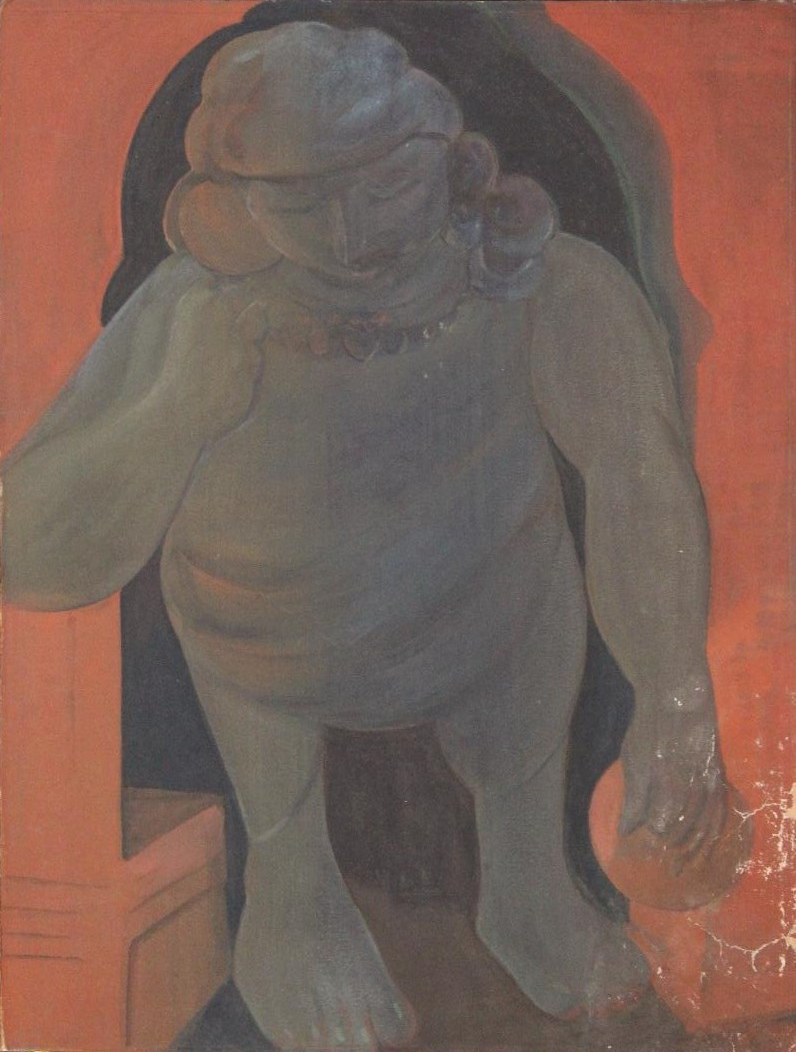

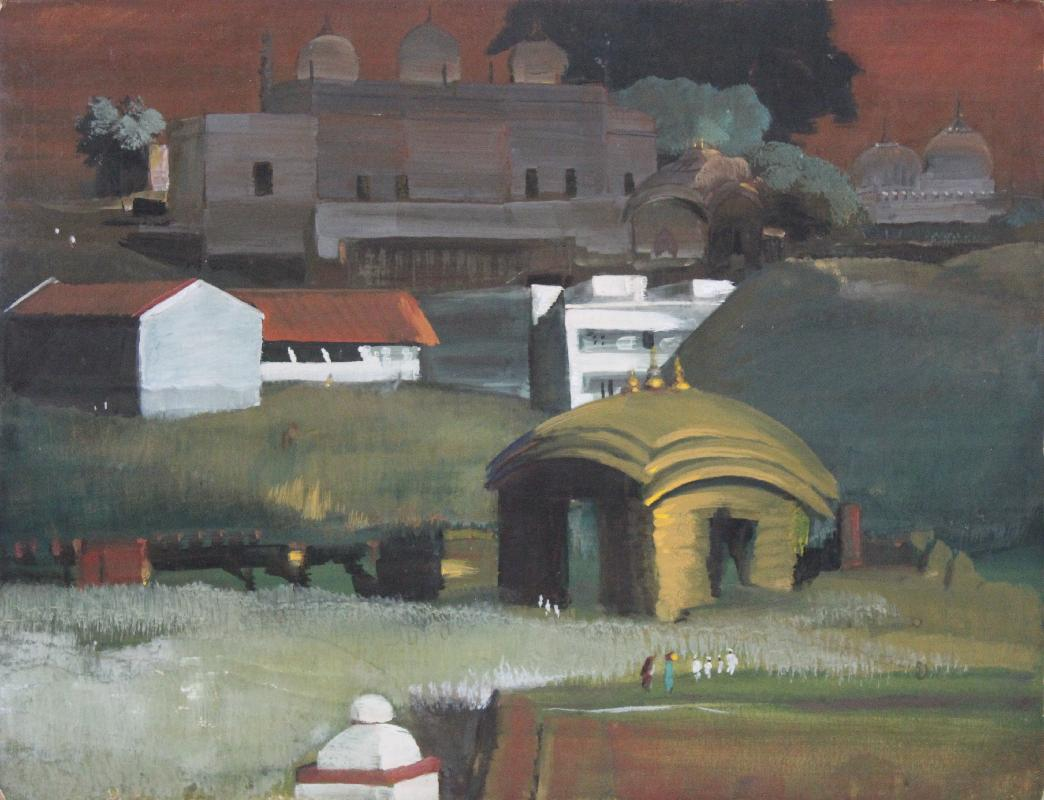

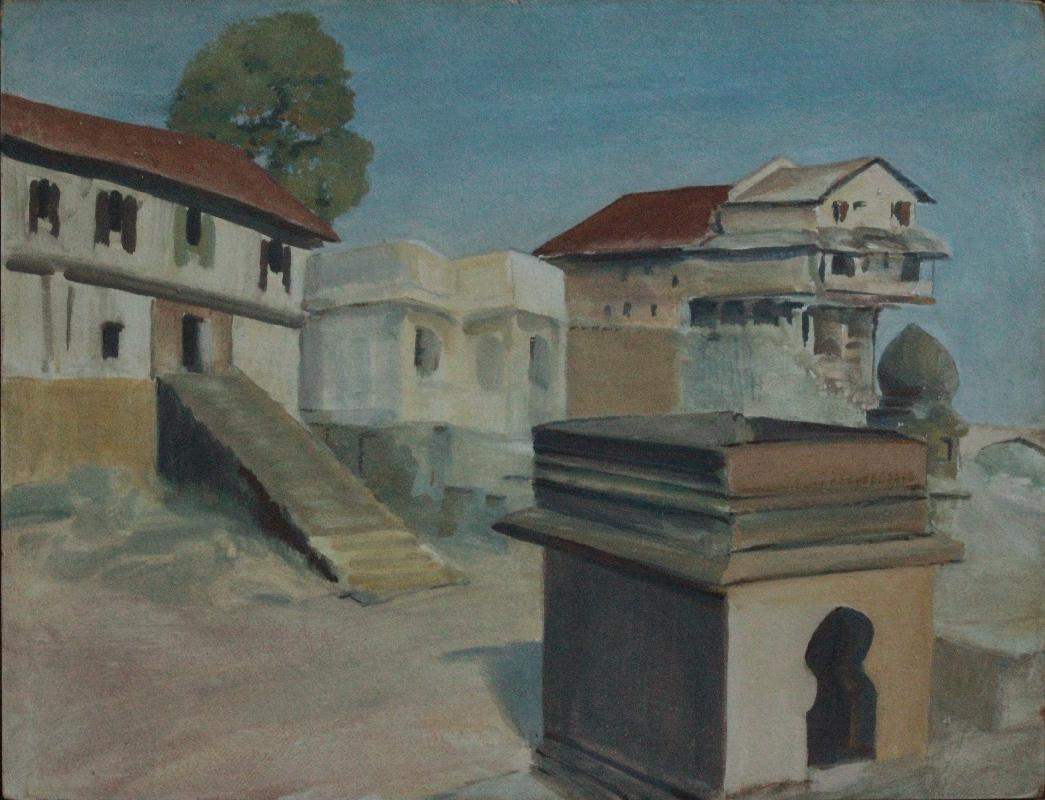

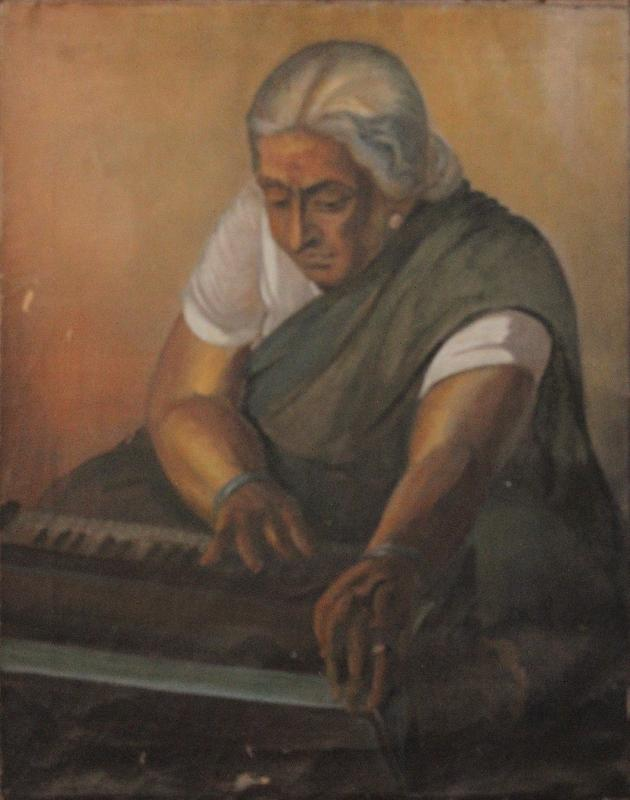

== Awards ==
Govind Solegaonkar was the recipient of many awards including:

- Topiwala Prize 1934 This prize was for the best composition on Indian History or Mythology
- The Miss Dolly Cursetji First Prize 1934
- Medals and Awards by Fine Art Society, Simla in 1933,1934
- Gold medal of the Bombay Art Society 1935
- The Bombay Government Fellow-ship in painting and commercial art 1935
- The Lord Hardings senior most scholarship 1934
- Patel Trophy winner of the Art Society of India 1953

== Exhibitions ==
Some of the exhibitions of Govind Solegaonkar's works are listed below:

- Exhibits in All India Fine arts exhibition, Indore - 1928
- Exhibits in All India Fine arts exhibition, Simla - 1932
- Exhibition at the Burlington Gallery, London - 1933
- Exhibits in Bombay Art Society's 44th annual exhibitions held, won Gold Medal - 1935
- Exhibits in Exhibition organized by Bombay School of Art - 1936
- Exhibits in Exhibition by 'Academy of Fine Arts, Calcutta - 1937
- Exhibits in Bombay Art Society's Golden Jubilee year exhibition held in 1939
- Show in Jehangir Art Gallery - Dec 1954, Jan 1957, Feb 1958, Nov 1962
- Shows in Europe during his tour, including 3 Exhibitions in Belgium - 1958-60
- Show in Taj Art Gallery - 1970
- Show in India House, London July, 1971
- Exhibits in Pravaha: Exhibition Highlighting Early Phase of Sir J.J. School of Art and the Progressive Art Movement, Chhatrapati Shivaji Maharaj Vastu Sangrahalaya (formerly Prince of Wales Museum of Western India) - 2017

== Displayed works ==
Govind Solegaonkar's works on display as of August 2017 include:

- Bhojashala - Indian Parliament - Panel No 41
- Mahiyari - Chhatrapati Shivaji Maharaj Vastu Sangrahalaya
- Gandhiji - In Mahatma Gandhi's birthplace at Porbandar
- Mural/Painting - Tata Institute Of Fundamental Research (TIFR)
