= Frank Simoes =

Indian advertising executive and writer (1937–2002)

- Born: Bombay, British India
- Occupations: Writer, Advertising executive
- Writing career
- Period: 20th century

Frank Simoes (1937–2002) was an Indian writer and pioneering advertising executive who was the first Indian to set up his own advertising agency. He initially worked for advertising agency Ogilvy & Mather before setting up his own company; his campaigns included work for Only Vimal, Raymonds, Taj Hotels, Liberty Shirts, and BOAC. He quit advertising while still successful in the 1970s. He sold his firm, and moved to Goa to become a writer.

== Career ==
Simoes began his career as a writer with The Times of India. After his initial foray into writing, he began to have his articles published fairly regularly.

Malavika Sanghvi wrote in her column in The Times:

The insecurity of mediocrity, and the largesse of genius. These were the thoughts that engaged me when I learnt that Frank Simoes had died on Sunday. Early on in his career he had established himself as the finest copywriter of his era; won every accolade, climbed every mountain, conquered every vista. He could have covered himself with the laurels of the past, coasted along on his early victories, going on doing the same things endlessly. But no, he realised he had nothing left to prove. No territories to protect. No ego to defend. He didn't strut, neither did he swagger, nor blow his own trumpet. He just moved on. Abdicating his throne to the multitudes of the mediocre. Who strutted, who swaggered, who blew their own trumpets. Ah, the insecurity of the mediocre, and the largesse of genius.
