= Brendan Pereira =

Indian businessman (1928–2024)

Brendan Conan Pereira
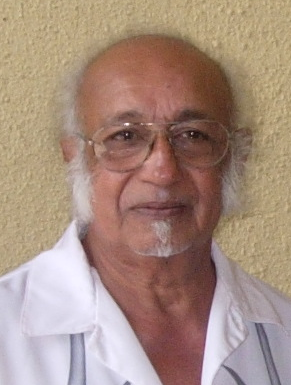
- Born: 23 November 1928; Bombay, Bombay Presidency, British India
- Died: 21 July 2024 (aged 95); Mumbai, Maharashtra, India
- Education: St. Isabel's, Mazagaon, St. Mary's School, Mumbai, Sir J.J. Institute of Applied Art
- Occupations: Creative Director, Designer
- Spouse: Therese
- Children: Ian, Maryan, Leon, and Gillian

Brendan Conan Pereira (23 November 1928 – 21 July 2024), also known as BCP, was an Indian advertising Creative Director.

== Background ==
Brendan Pereira was born on 23 November 1928, to Albert and Louise Pereira. He attended St. Isabel's and St. Mary's High School, both in Mazagaon, Mumbai. In 1945, he enrolled in Sir J.J. Institute of Applied Art, to pursue a Diploma in Applied Art where he learnt block-making, lithography, and photography—as subsidiary subjects. In 1949, he joined L.A. Stronachs Advertising as an apprentice. Later he joined D.J. Keymer (Bensons, OBM, now O&M) as visualiser and assistant to art director P.N. Sarma.

In 1954, he married Therese (née Aranha). In 1956, he left Bombay for the UK for further education and experience. In London, he joined Rapier Design, then Baron Moss, where he was later appointed art director. Subsequently, he joined C.Vernon's and worked on a range of products. At the same time, he took courses at the Institute of Practitioners in Advertising.

Pereira died in Mumbai on 21 July 2024, at the age of 95.

== Professional work ==
In 1960, he joined Aiyars Advertising, Bombay to work on the Beechams account they had just acquired. He spent a year with Beechams in London, to learn about their products and their marketing worldwide. In 1961, he returned to Aiyars Advertising as Creative Director with the responsibility for all creative work as well as handling the Beecham account. Eventually, Aiyars linked with LPE, London as LPE-Aiyars and he was elected to the board.

In March 1972, he left Aiyars Advertising to co-found Chaitra Advertising (now Leo Burnett) along with Walter Saldanha. In 1983, he left Chaitra to form his own consultancy, GLIMA. Clarion Advertising appointed him as a Creative Consultant. In 1992, he supported the formation of Nova Advertising Palace with executives from Clarion and had a long association with this agency as Consultant, Managing Director and shareholder.

In 2001, he retired but continued to do charity work for the church and some NGOs.

== Recognition ==
Pereira was President of Communication Arts Guild (CAG), Mumbai from 1976–1993, and was Inducted to their Hall of Fame in 1993. On 12 January 2014, he received a lifetime achievement award by the Cathedral of the Holy Name Archdiocese, Mumbai.

He lectured at The Advertising Club, taught at St. Xavier's Institute of Communication in Mumbai, National Institute of Design in Ahmedabad, Tata Administrative Services in Pune, Jamnalal Bajaj Institute of Management Studies in Mumbai and The Packaging Institute. He taught advertising, typography, and design. He was also the first Indian Member of the Art Directors Club of New York.

He published a book about his work entitled, Changing Faces.
