= Aptech =

Indian education and training pvt company

Aptech Ltd.
- Type: Public
- Traded as: BSE: 532475; NSE: APTECHT
- Industry: Non-formal vocational training Online and computer-based examinations
- Founded: 1986
- Headquarters: Mumbai, India
- Key people: Dr. Anuj Kacker CEO (Interim)
- Revenue: ▼₹95.68 crore (US$9.9 million) (2021)
- Net income: ▼₹12.26 crore (US$1.3 million) (2021)
- Total assets: ▼₹221.31 crore (US$23 million) (2021)
- Total equity: ▼₹166.35 crore (US$17 million) (2021)
- Number of employees: 483 (31 March 2025)
- Website: aptech-worldwide.com

Aptech Limited is an Indian multinational company that provides vocational training and education services. It was founded in 1986 and is headquartered in Mumbai, Maharashtra.

== History ==
Aptech Limited was founded in 1986 by Atul Nishar as a computer training institute in Mumbai. In 2003, the company was acquired by Kalpathi Suresh, owner of the Chennai-based IT training firm SSI.

Two years later, Rakesh Jhunjhunwala purchased a majority stake and served as chairman until April 2021, when Vijay Aggarwal took over the role.

Aptech began conducting recruitment and competitive examinations in the late 2000s. It reported administering 1.55 million online tests in 2012 and 1.81 million in 2013, including the Common Management Admission Test across 62 cities in India.

== Controversy ==
=== Blacklisting Controversy ===
Aptech Limited was blacklisted in May 2019 for three years by the Uttar Pradesh government after being found involved in fraud and irregularities while conducting recruitment exams for government posts. The company's involvement in alleged scams in other states including Uttar Pradesh, Haryana, Rajasthan, and Assam has been documented, with several government recruitment and eligibility exams marred by paper leaks and procedural violations.

=== Regulatory Penalty ===
In 2021, the Securities and Exchange Board of India (SEBI) fined Aptech ₹1 crore for violations of insider trading regulations.

=== Railway Exam Paper Leak ===
In January 2021, Aptech Limited allegated of involvement in the leakage of question papers and answers for the General Departmental Competitive Examination conducted by the Railway Recruitment Centre in Mumbai.

According to a First Information Report filed by the Central Bureau of Investigation, Aptech, which had been appointed as the exam conducting agency, was accused of conspiring to provide candidates with advance access to question papers in exchange for payments ranging between ₹2 lakh and ₹5 lakh.

The investigation suggested that some candidates viewed the papers beforehand at a hotel and received assistance from intermediaries described as exam experts. Reports also indicated that exam results circulated through unofficial WhatsApp links prior to their formal release.

The CBI initiated searches across multiple locations, naming 15 accused individuals, including railway employees, a CRPF officer, and persons associated with Aptech Limited.

== Recognition ==
- Media and Entertainment Skills Council (MESC) in association with Aptech Ltd's two major brands Arena Animation and MAAC (Maya Academy of Advanced Cinematics) organised India's First and largest media job festival.
