= Chhatrapati Shivaji Maharaj Vastu Sangrahalaya =

Museum in Mumbai, India

Chhatrapati Shivaji Maharaj Vastu Sanghralaya (CSMVS)
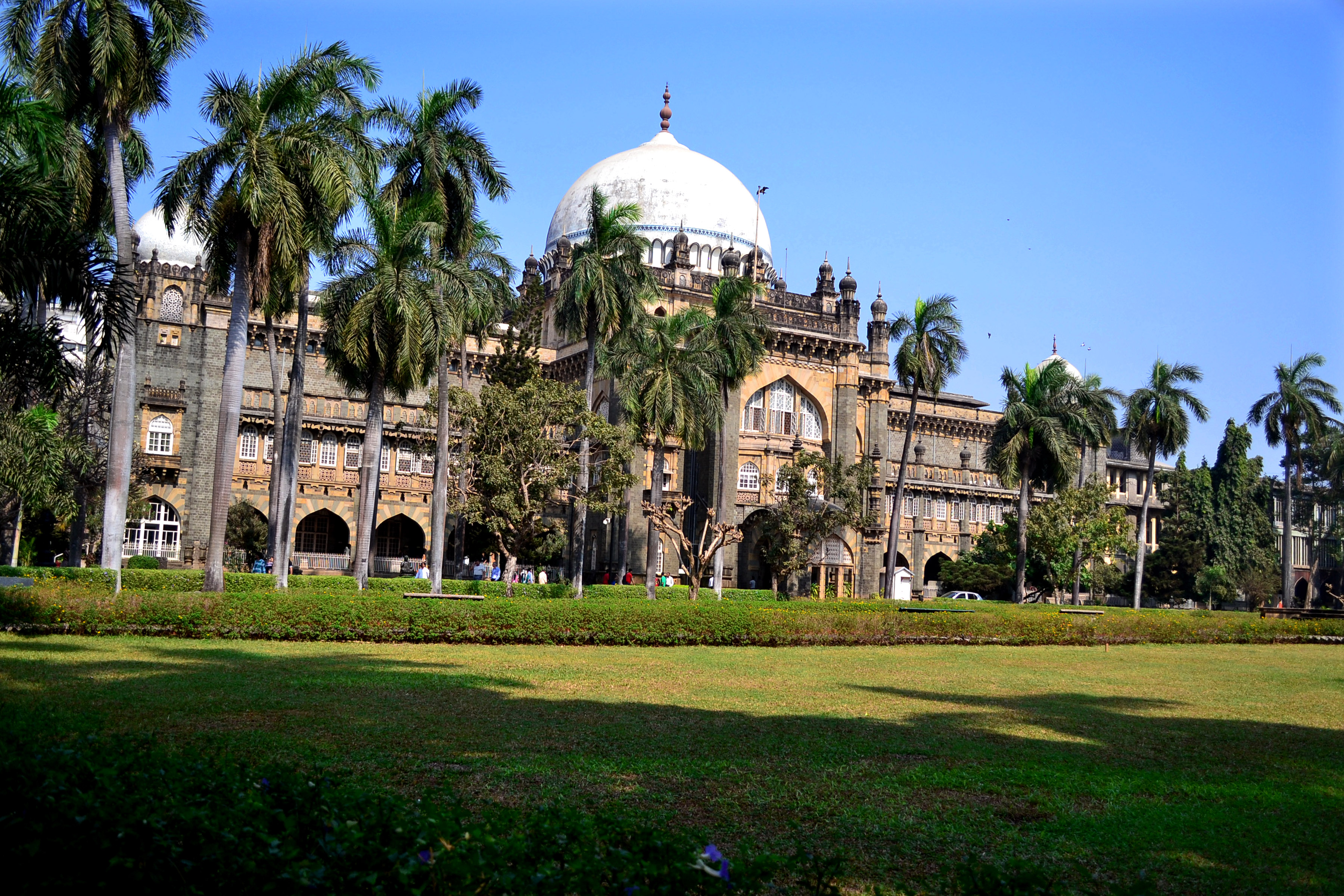
- Façade of Chhatrapati Shivaji Maharaj Vastu Sanghralaya (CSMVS)
- Former name: Prince of Wales Museum of Western India
- Established: 10 January 1922; 104 years ago
- Location: Mahatma Gandhi Road, Fort, Mumbai, India
- Coordinates: 18.926667°N 72.832222°E
- Type: Archaeology, Art and Natural history museum
- Collection size: Approx. 50,000 artefacts
- Director: Sabyasachi Mukherjee
- Architect: George Wittet
- Public transit access: Chhatrapati Shivaji Terminus; Churchgate
- Website: csmvs.in

UNESCO World Heritage Site
- Criteria: Cultural: (ii) (iv)
- Designated: 2018 (43rd session)
- Part of: Victorian Gothic and Art Deco Ensembles of Mumbai
- Reference no.: 1480

Chhatrapati Shivaji Maharaj Vastu Sangrahalaya, (CSMVS) formerly named the Prince of Wales Museum of Western India, is a museum in Mumbai (Bombay) which documents the history of India from prehistoric to modern times.

It was founded during British rule of India in the early years of the 20th century by prominent citizens of the city then called Bombay, with the help of the government, to commemorate the visit of the Prince of Wales (later George V, king of the United Kingdom and emperor of India). It is located in the heart of South Mumbai near the Gateway of India. The museum was renamed in 1998 after Shivaji maharaj, the founder of the Maratha Kingdom.

The building is built in the Indo-Saracenic style of architecture, incorporating elements of other styles of architecture like the Mughal, Maratha and Jain. The museum building is surrounded by a garden of palm trees and formal flower beds.

The museum houses approximately 50,000 exhibits of ancient Indian history as well as objects from foreign lands, categorised primarily into three sections: Art, Archaeology and Natural History. The museum houses Indus Valley Civilization artefacts, and other relics from ancient India from the time of the Guptas, Mauryas, Chalukyas and Rashtrakuta.

== History ==
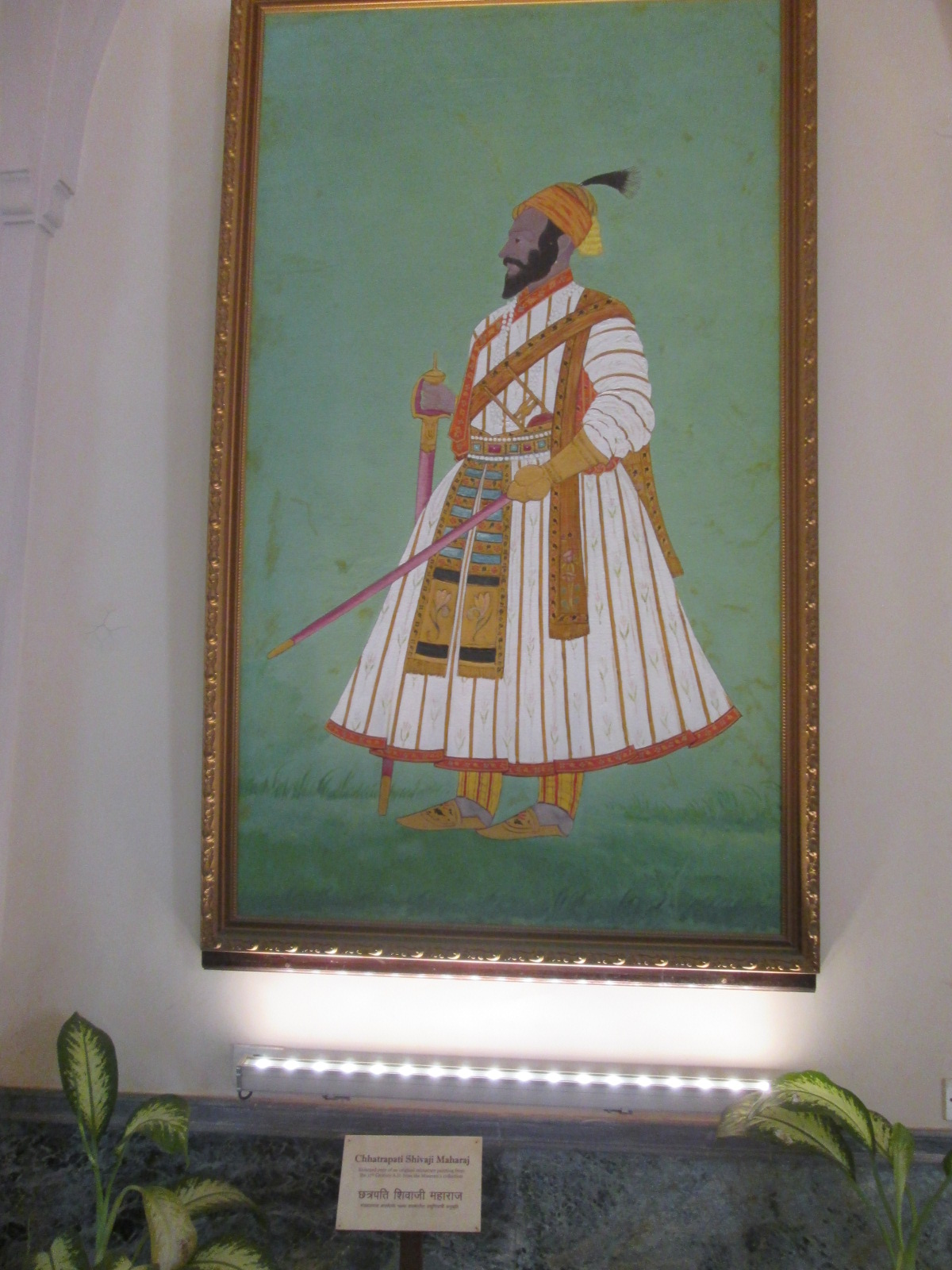
A portrait of Shivaji at the entrance of the museum

In 1904, some leading citizens of Bombay decided to provide a museum to commemorate the visit of the Prince of Wales, the future King George V. On 14 August 1905, the committee passed a resolution saying:

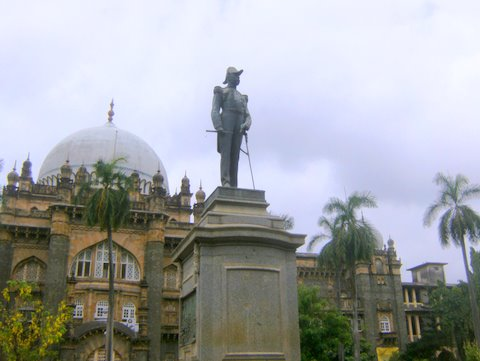
Statue of The Prince of Wales, who later became the Emperor, George V

"The museum building embodies the pomp and height at which the British raj was moving, ahead with their ambitious plans, in building the great metropolis Mumbai". "In keeping pace with the best style of local architecture, many buildings were built, among which, Mumbai High Court building, and later, Gateway of India buildings were the most notable ones".

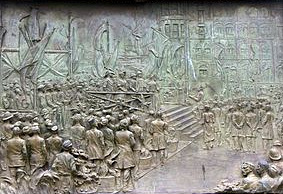
On two sides of the statue has mural type of stone carving depicting the POW inaugurating the museum

The foundation stone was laid by the Prince of Wales on 11 November 1905 and the museum was formally named "Prince of Wales Museum of Western India". On 1 March 1907, the government of the Bombay Presidency granted the museum committee a piece of land called the "Crescent Site", where the museum now stands. Following an open design competition, in 1909 the architect George Wittet was commissioned to design the Museum building. Wittet had already worked on the design of the General Post Office and in 1911 would design one of Mumbai's most famous landmarks, the Gateway of India.

The museum was funded by the Royal Visit (1905) Memorial Funds. Additionally, the Government and the Municipality granted Rs. 300,000 and Rs. 250,000 respectively. Sir Currimbhoy Ebrahim (first Baronet) donated another Rs. 300,00O and Sir Cowasji Jehangir gave Rs. 50,000. The Museum was established under Bombay Act No. III of 1909. The museum is now maintained by annual grants from the Government and the Bombay Municipal Corporation. The latter pays for these grants from the interest accruing on the funds at the disposal of the Trust of the Museum.

The museum building was completed in 1915, but was used as a Children's Welfare Centre and a Military Hospital during the First World War, before being handed over to the committee in 1920. The Prince of Wales Museum was inaugurated on 10 January 1922, by Lady Lloyd, the wife of George Lloyd, Governor of Bombay.

The museum building is a Grade I Heritage Building of the city and was awarded first prize (Urban Heritage Award) by the Bombay Chapter of the Indian Heritage Society for heritage building maintenance in 1990. In 1998 the Museum was renamed Chhatrapati Shivaji Maharaj Vastu Sangrahalaya after the warrior king and founder of the Maratha Kingdom, Shivaji. The museum was renamed after the renaming of the city in 1995, when the colonial name "Bombay" was replaced by the native "Mumbai".

== Architecture ==
The museum building is situated in 3 acres (12,000 m^{2}) area, having a built-up area of 12,142.23m sq. It is surrounded by a garden of palm trees and formal flower beds.

The museum building, built of locally quarried grey Kurla basalt and buff coloured trachyte Malad stone. It is a three-storied rectangular structure, capped by a dome set upon a base, which adds an additional storey in the centre of the building. Built in the Western Indian and Indo-Saracenic style of architecture, the building accommodates a central entrance porch, above which rises a dome, tilled and modified well "tiled in white and blue flecks, supported on a lotus - petal base". A cluster of pinnacles, topped with miniature domes surround the central dome. The building incorporates features like Islamic dome with a finial along with protruding balconies and inlaid floors, inspired by Mughal palace architecture. The architect, George Wittet, modelled the dome on that of Golconda Fort and the inner vaulting arches on those at the Gol Gumbaz in Bijapur. The interior of the museum combines the columns, railings and balcony of an 18th-century Wada (a Maratha mansion) with Jain style interior columns, which form the main body of the central pavilion below the Maratha balcony.

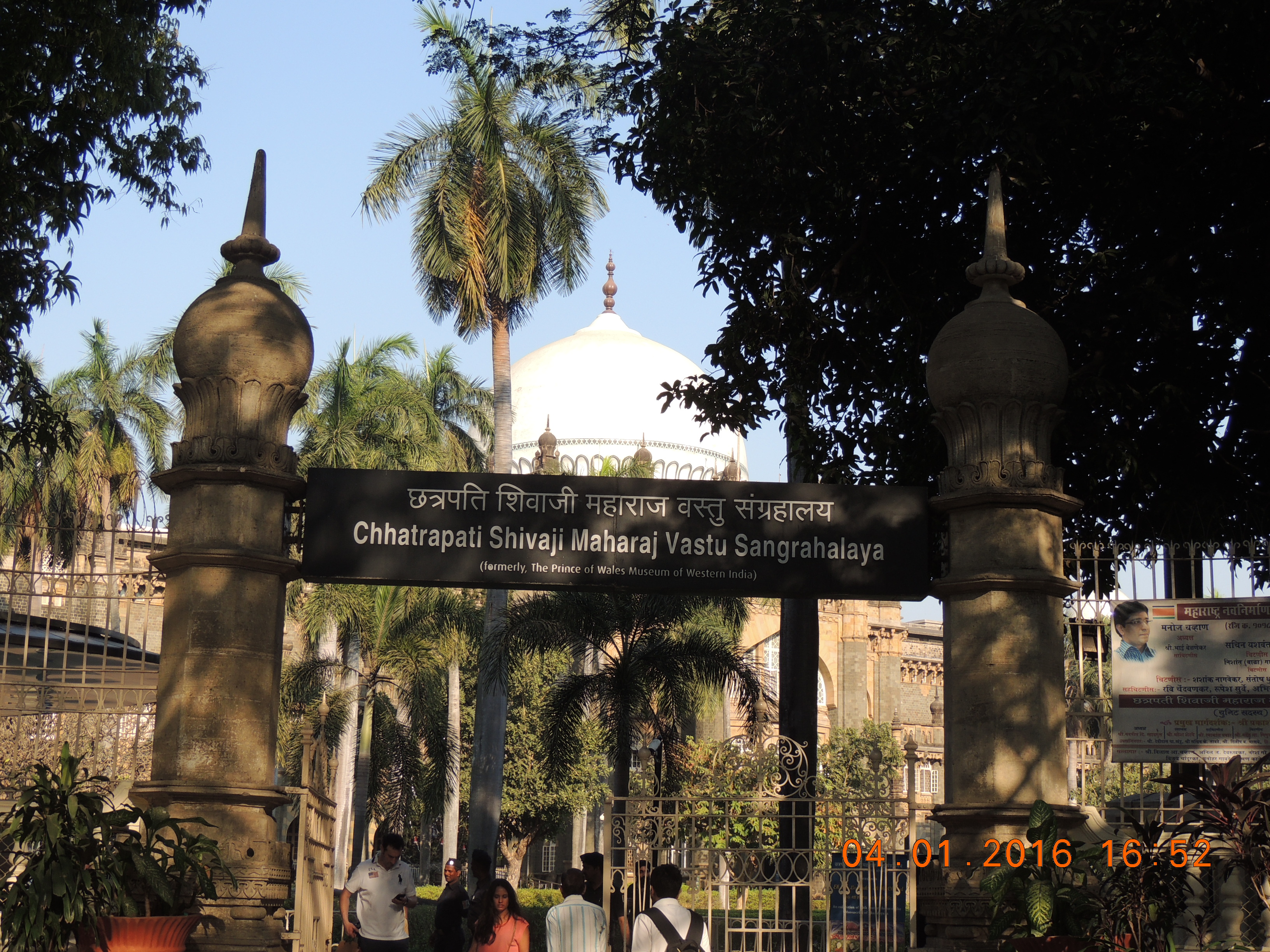
Gate of Chhatrapati Shivaji Maharaj Vastu Sangrahalaya

In its recent modernisation programme (2008), the museum created 30,000 sq ft (2,800 m^{2}) space for installation of five new galleries, a conservation studio, a visiting exhibition gallery and a seminar room, in the East Wing of the museum. The museum also houses a library.

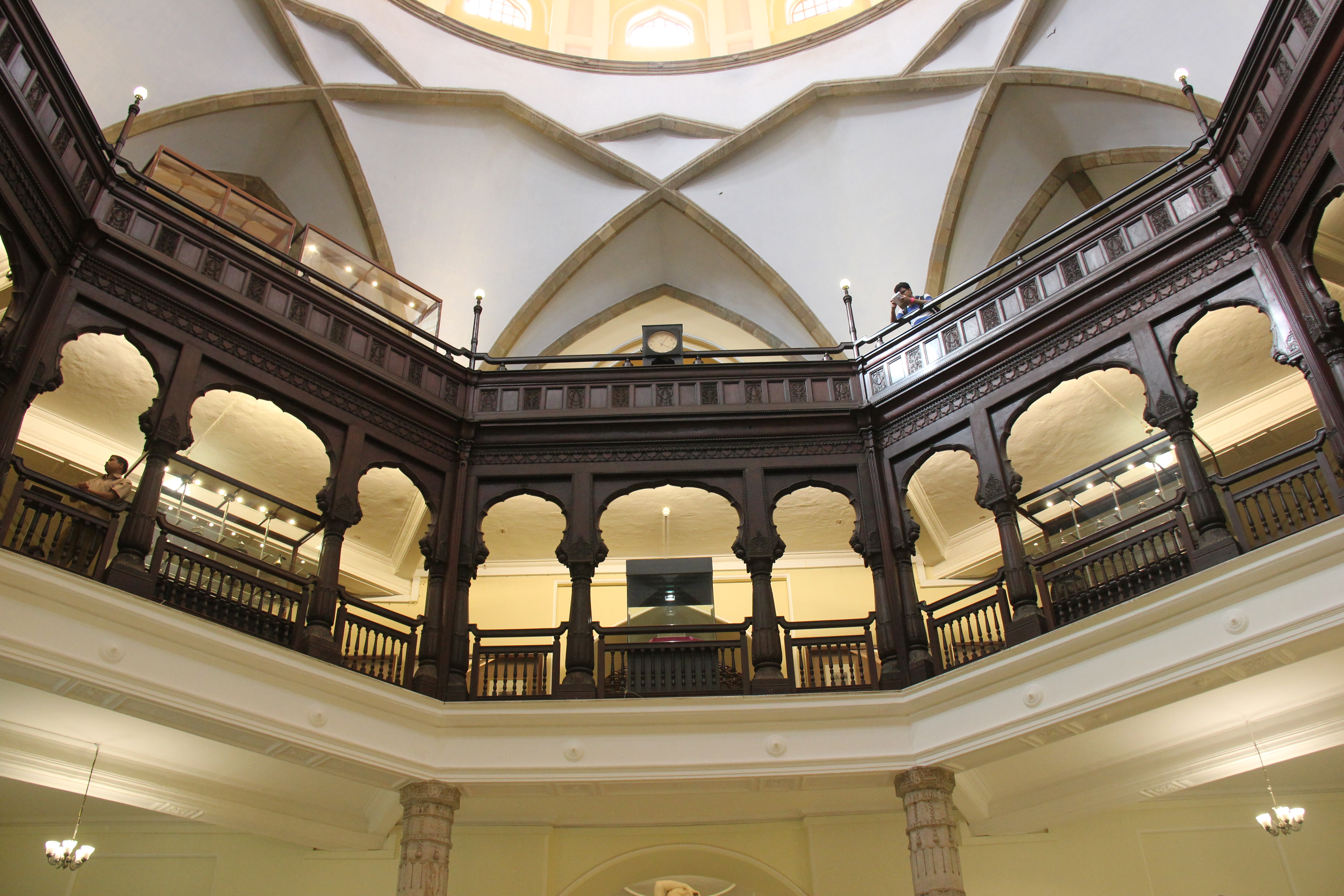
Main lobby of the museum

== Collections ==
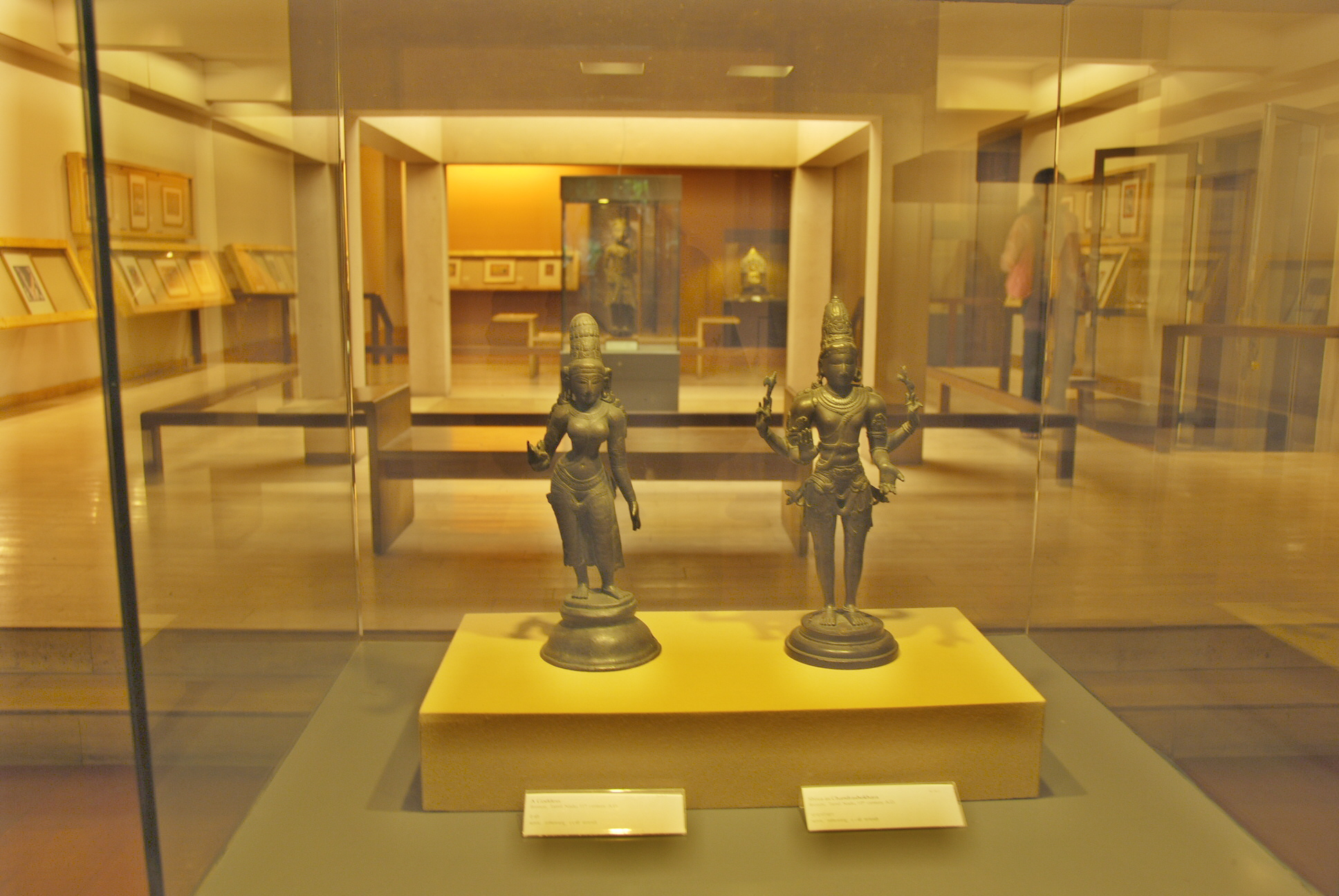
Karl and Meherbai Khandalavala collection - gallery

The museum collection comprises approximately 50,000 artefacts. The collection of the museum is categorised primarily into three sections: art, archaeology and natural history. The museum also houses a forestry section, which has specimens of timbers grown in the Bombay Presidency (British India), and one exhibiting a small local geological collection of rocks, minerals and fossils. The Maritime Heritage Gallery, which displays objects relating to navigation, is the "first of its kind in India". In 2008, the museum installed two new galleries, displaying the "Karl and Meherbai Khandalavala collection" and "the Coins of India".

=== Art section ===
The art section displays the collections of Sir Purushottam Mavji, acquired in 1915, and the art collections of Sir Ratan Tata and Sir Dorab Tata, donated in 1921 and 1933 respectively.

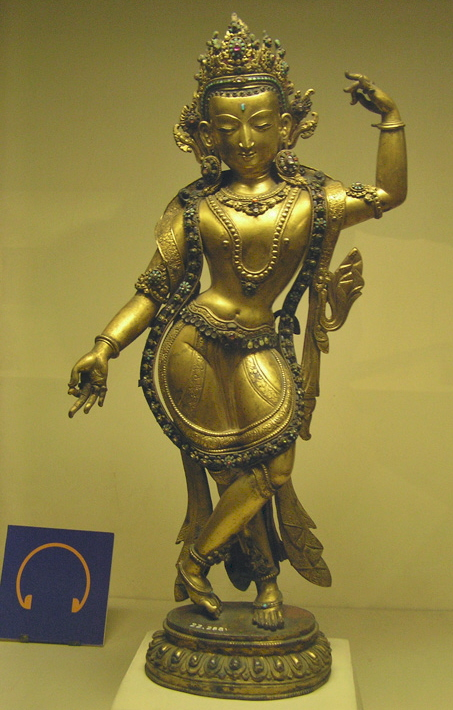
Dancing Krishna, from the Nepal-Tibet section. Nepal, 18th century AD. The headphone symbol at the foot of the image indicates that the artefact is part of the audio tour. The museum provides an audio tour in six languages to visitors.

The museum's miniature collection encompasses representations of the main schools of Indian painting namely, Mughal, Rajasthani, Pahari and Deccani. It features palm leaf manuscripts dating to the 11th-12th centuries to the early 19th century pahari paintings, as well as paintings from the Sultanate period. Notable manuscripts housed in the museum include the Anwar-Suhayli painted in Mughal emperor Akbar’s studio and a 17th-century manuscript of the Hindu epic Ramayana from Mewar.

The ivory section has artefacts dating as early as the Gupta era. The museum also has decorative artefacts such as textiles, ivories, Mughal jades, silver, gold and artistic metal ware. It also has a collection of European paintings, Chinese and Japanese porcelain, ivory and jade artefacts. The museum also has sections dedicated to arms and armour and another to Nepali and Tibetan art. The arms and armour section contains a finely decorated armour of Akbar dating to 1581 CE, consisting of a steel breastplate and a shield, the former inscribed with religious verses.

=== Archaeological section ===
Sculptures and coins transferred from the Poona Museum in Pune and the collections of the Bombay branch of the Royal Asiatic Society resulted in the development of an archaeological section, with precious sculptures and epigrams. The Indus Valley Culture Gallery houses fishing hooks, weapons, ornaments and weights and measures from the Indus Valley Civilization (2600–1900 BCE). Artefacts from the excavation of the Buddhist stupa of Mirpurkhas, were housed in the Museum in 1919. The sculpture collection holds Gupta (280 to 550 CE) terracotta figures from Mirpurkhas in Sind of the early 5th century, artefacts dating to the Chalukyan era (6th-12th century, Badami Chalukyas and Western Chalukyas), and sculptures of the Rashtrakuta period (753 – 982 CE) from Elephanta, near Mumbai.

=== Natural history section ===
The Bombay Natural History Society aided the Museum Trust in creating the natural history section. The museum's natural history section makes use of habitat group cases and dioramas, along with diagrams and charts, to illustrate Indian wildlife, including flamingoes, great hornbills, Indian bison, and tigers.

=== New galleries ===
An exhibition entitled Pravaha highlighting early phase of Sir J. J. School of Art and the Progressive Art Movement was launched on 24 July 2017. The exhibition covered a range of paintings from the 1880s to 1950s through works of Pestonji Bomanji, Rustom Siodia, Sawlaram Haldankar, António Xavier Trindade, S. N. Gorakshakar, Govind Mahadev Solegaonkar, G. H. Nagarkar, J. M. Ahivasi, Raghunath Dhondopant Dhopeshwarkar, Raghuveer Govind Chimulkar, Rasiklal Parikh and Y. K. Shukla, Abalal Rahiman, Keshav Bhavanrao Chudekar, Lakshman Narayan Taskar, Syed Haider Raza, and K. H. Ara.

A prints gallery was launched with an exhibition entitled Bombay to Mumbai - Door of the East with its face to the West on 29 January 2015. The gallery was inaugurated by Neil MacGregor, Director of the British Museum in London, who also gave an illustrated lecture on 'World Cultures' at the central foyer of the museum.

As part of the renovation project initiated in October 2008, the Krishna Gallery holding artworks related to the Hindu god Krishna, a Hindu deity of the preserver-god Vishnu, was opened in March 2009.

A textile gallery, the first gallery in the city, was opened in April 2010. It illustrates "various techniques of textile manufacturing, regional collections and traditional Indian costumes".

Matrika Design Collaborative is currently designing the museum's Indian miniature painting gallery. The content developed for the gallery will be converted into Braille text and tactile labels for the blind with help from designers, fabricators and consultants from the Helen Keller Institute.

A new gallery on traditional Indian jewellery will be opening in 2020. At the gallery, there will be an exhibit on Golconda diamonds - replicas of which have been presented to the museum.

== Galleries ==
CSMVS Museum has various galleries. They are related to Art, History, Natural History and Indian Culture. They are as follows:

- Sculpture gallery
- Pre and Proto History gallery
- Natural History Section
- Indian Miniature Painting gallery
- Krishna gallery
- Himalayan Art gallery
- Decorative Metalware gallery
- House of Laxmi- Coin gallery
- Karl and Meherbai Khandalavala gallery
- Chinese and Japanese Art gallery
- Sir Ratan Tata and Sir Dorab Tata gallery of European Paintings
- Arms and Armour gallery
- Jehangir Nicholson gallery
- Premchand Roychand gallery
- Key gallery
- First Floor Circle gallery
- Second Floor Circle gallery
- European Decorative Art gallery
- Bombay School gallery
- Jahangir Sabawala gallery
- Textile Gallery
- Prints gallery
- Curators gallery and Conservation Centre

== Sculpture Gallery ==
The archaeological collections were originally started by pioneering archaeologists Sir Henry Cousens and Sir John Marshall. Amongst the important sculptures are the Gupta period terracottas and bricks from Mirpurkhas excavated by Cousens, a large number of Buddhist images from Gandhara and ceiling panels from a dilapidated temple at Aihole. The early examples are from Pauni and Pitalkhora. Mumbai itself has a rich tradition exemplified by the colossal Parel Relief of Shiva (represented here by a cast) and a Matrika from Baijanath Temple at Sewri near Parel belonging to the same phase as Elephanta. Other noteworthy images from Maharashtra are a Vishnu and a Ganesha of the eleventh century CE. Some well known sculptures are:

- Brahma, from Elephanta Caves
- Mahishasuramardini, from Elephanta
- Parel Relief of Shiva (plaster cast) from Parel
- Sculptures from Aihole and Pattadakal
- Dvarapala, from Shamalji, Gujarat
- Garuda, from the Konark Sun Temple
- Yaksha, from Pitalkhora
- Buddha and Devotee from Mirpur Khas
- Early 2nd Century BCE & 1st Century CE bronze images of 23rd Jain Tirthankara Pārśvanātha
- Ashthamahesha Replica bust

== Centenary celebrations ==
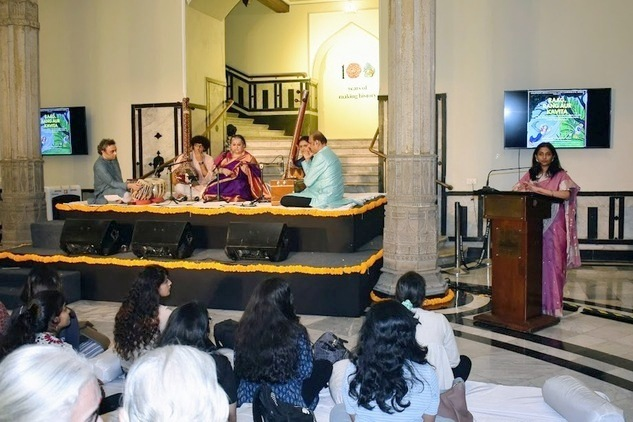
CSMVS, Mumbai, is celebrating its centenary year.

== Picture gallery ==
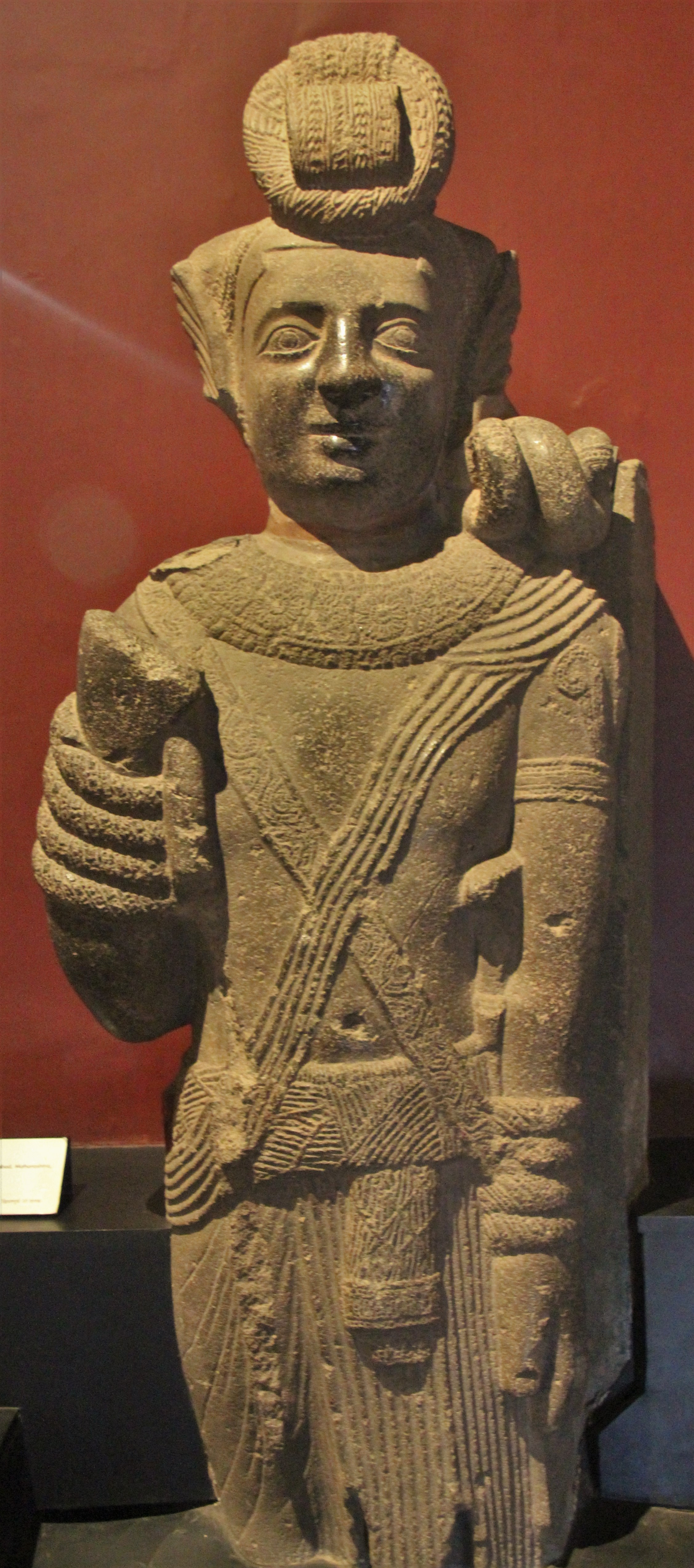
Dvarapala Yaksha, Pitalkhora Buddhist caves (2nd century CE)

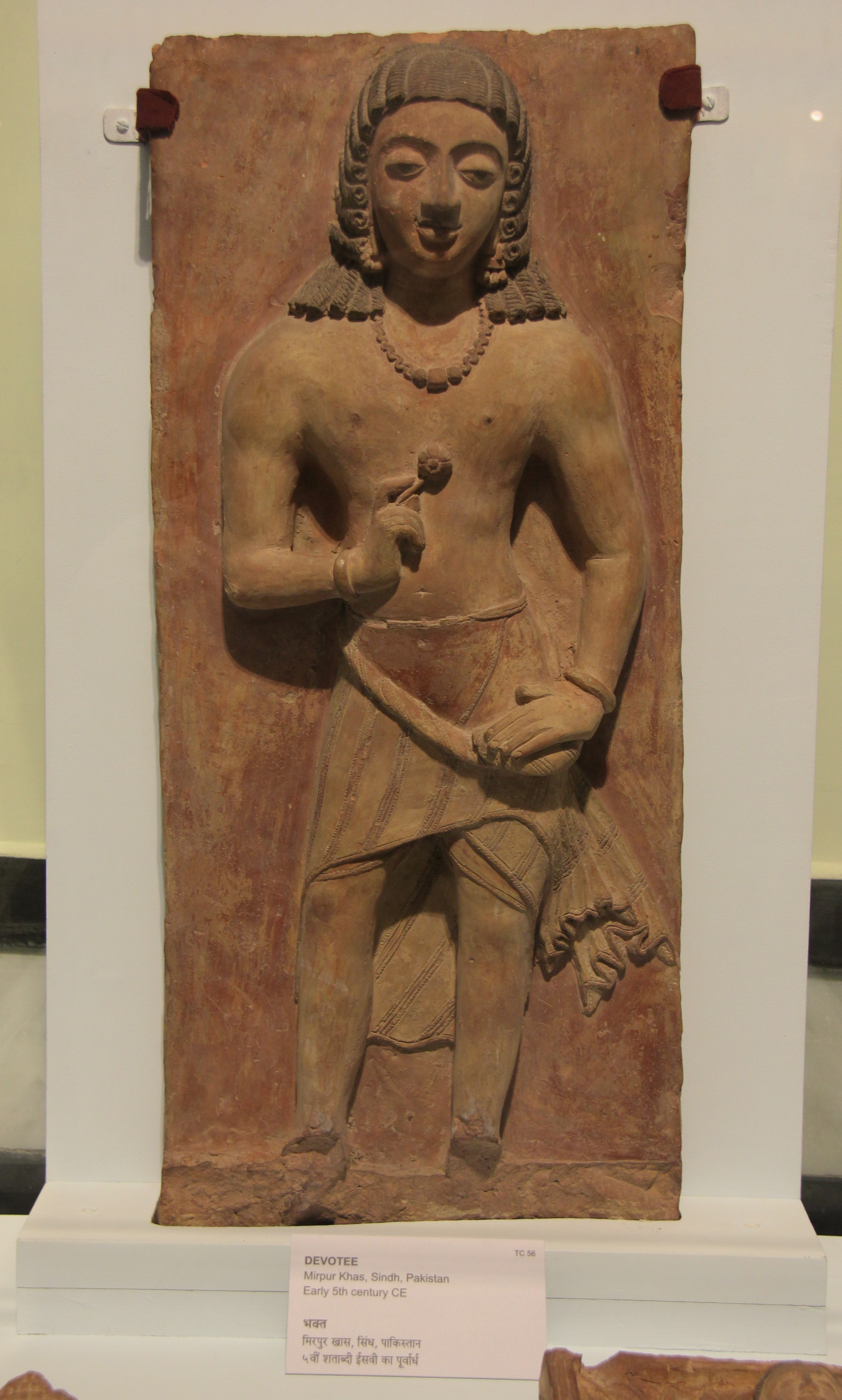
Devotee statue from Mirpur Khas in Sindh (present day Pakistan) (5th century CE)

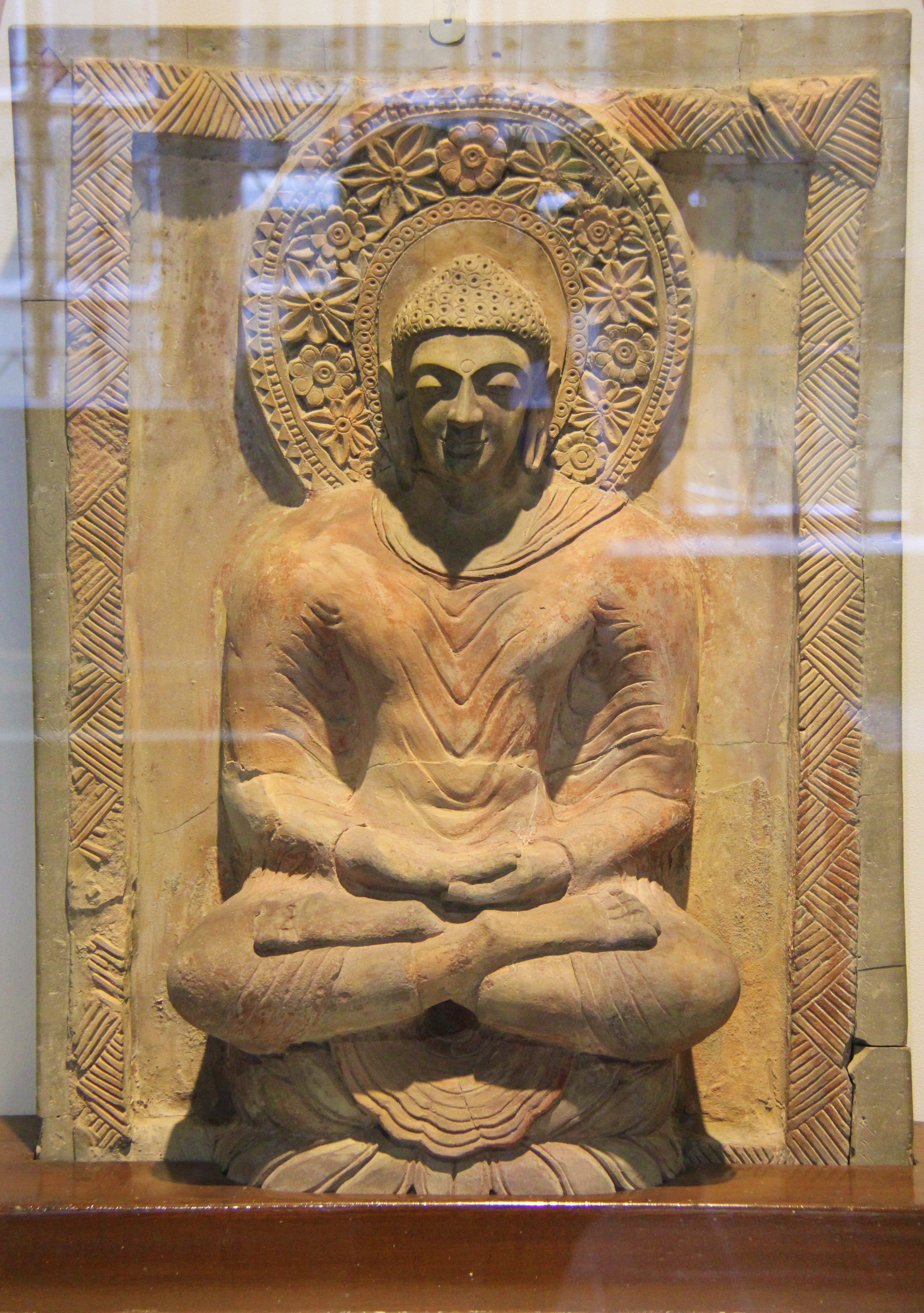
Buddha statue made of terracotta, Mirpur Khas (5th century CE)

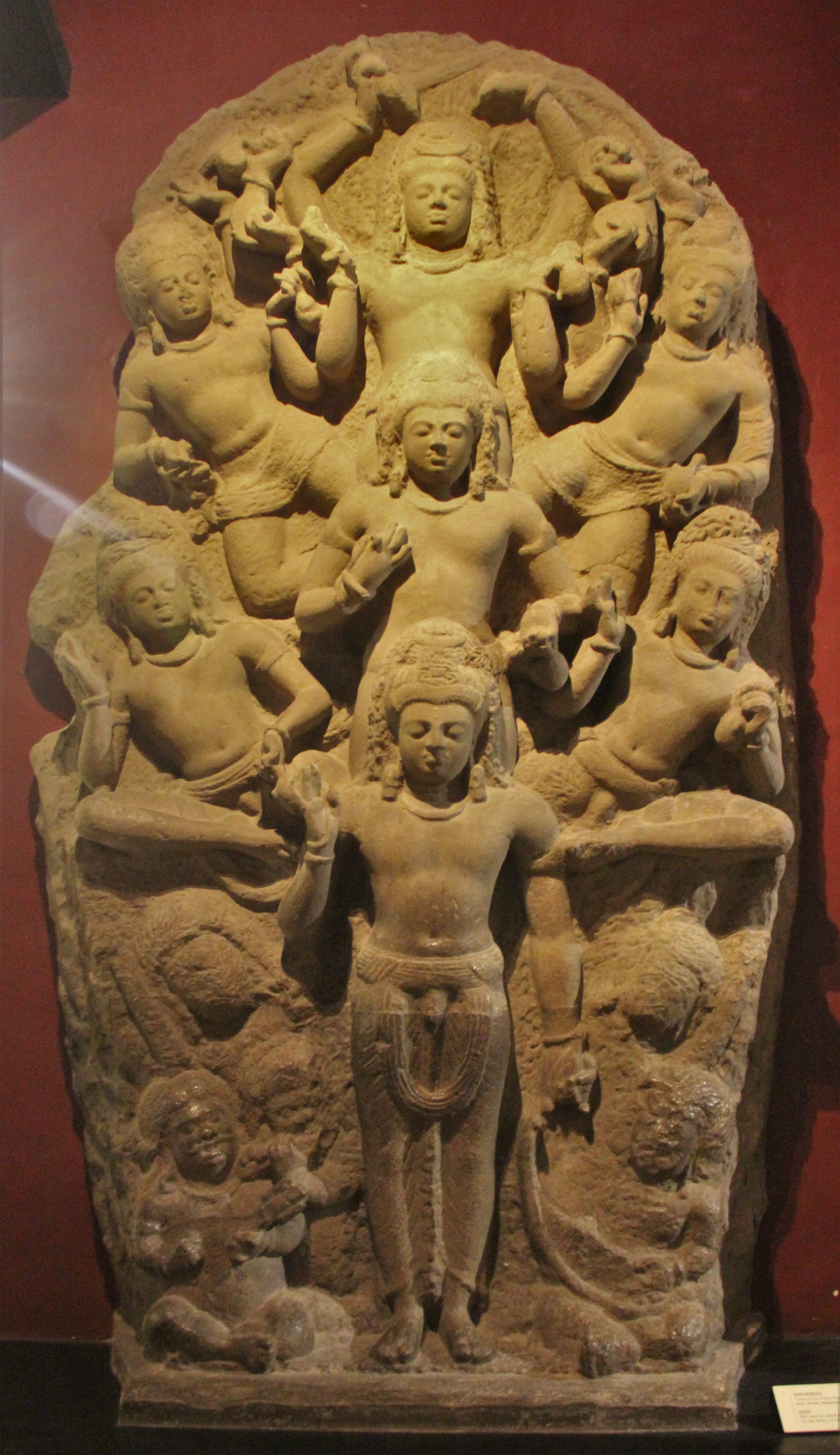
Parel Relief of Shiva (plaster cast), 6th century CE

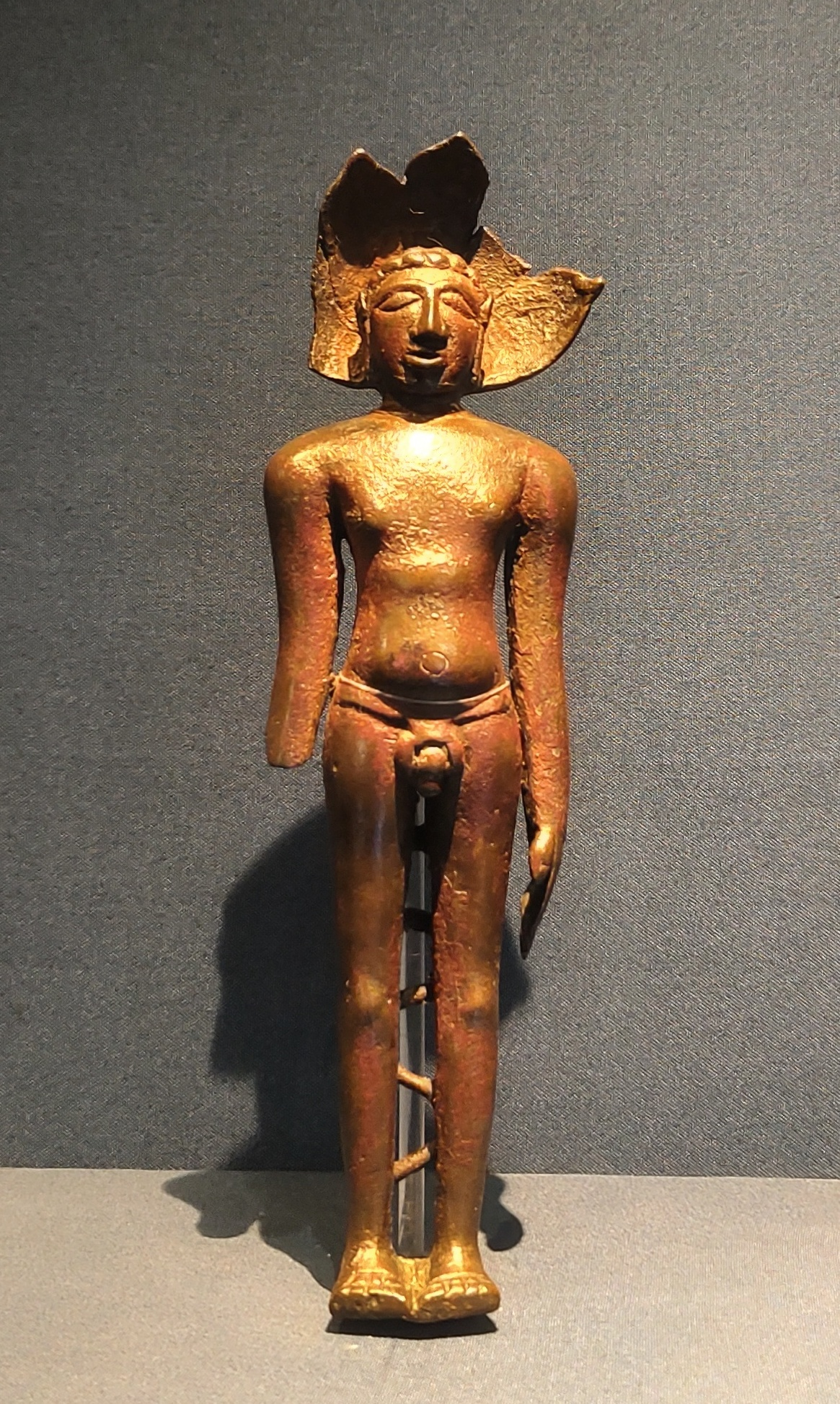
Parshvanatha, bronze, Eastern India (2nd century CE)

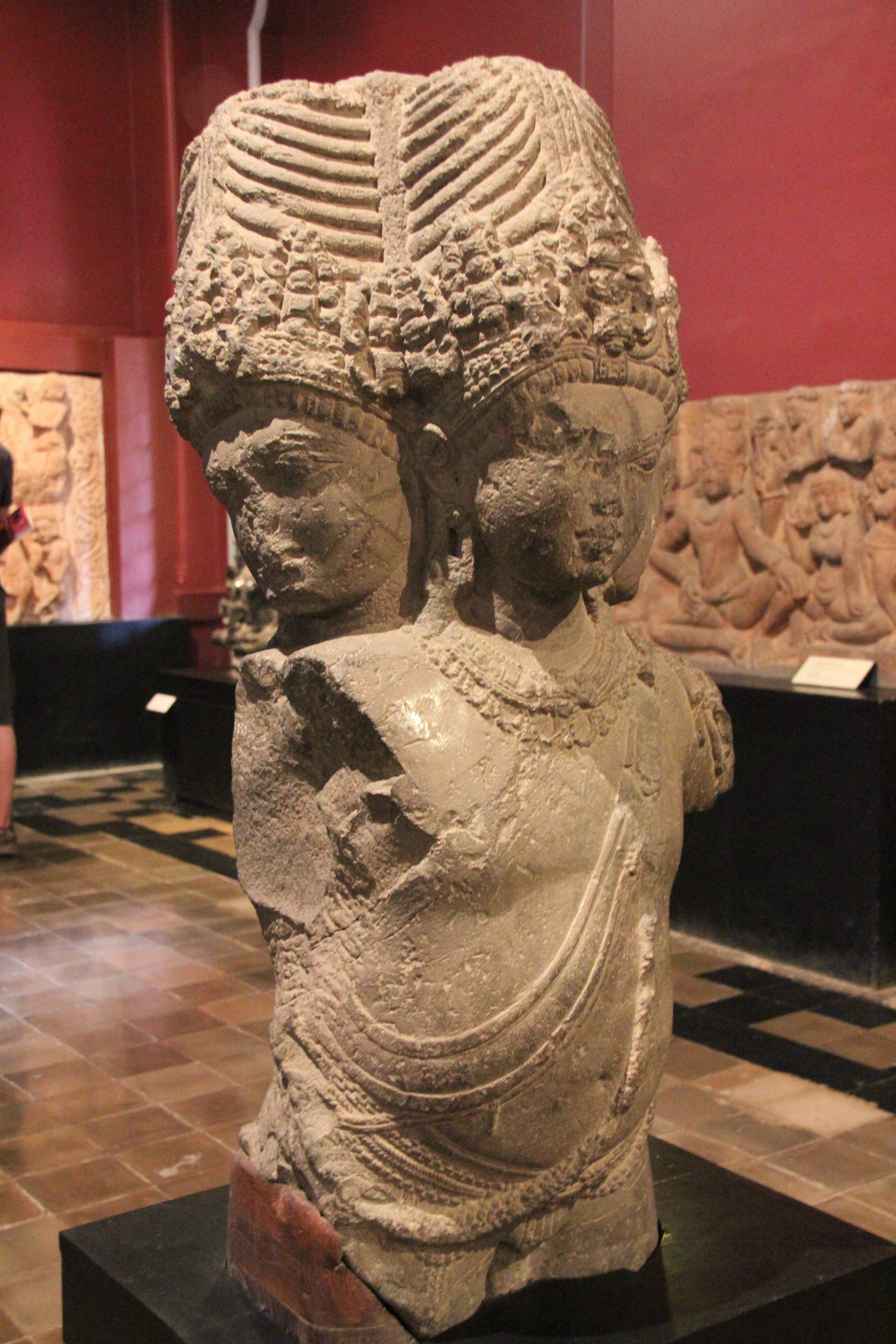
Brahma statue made of basalt and found in Elephanta Caves (6th century CE).

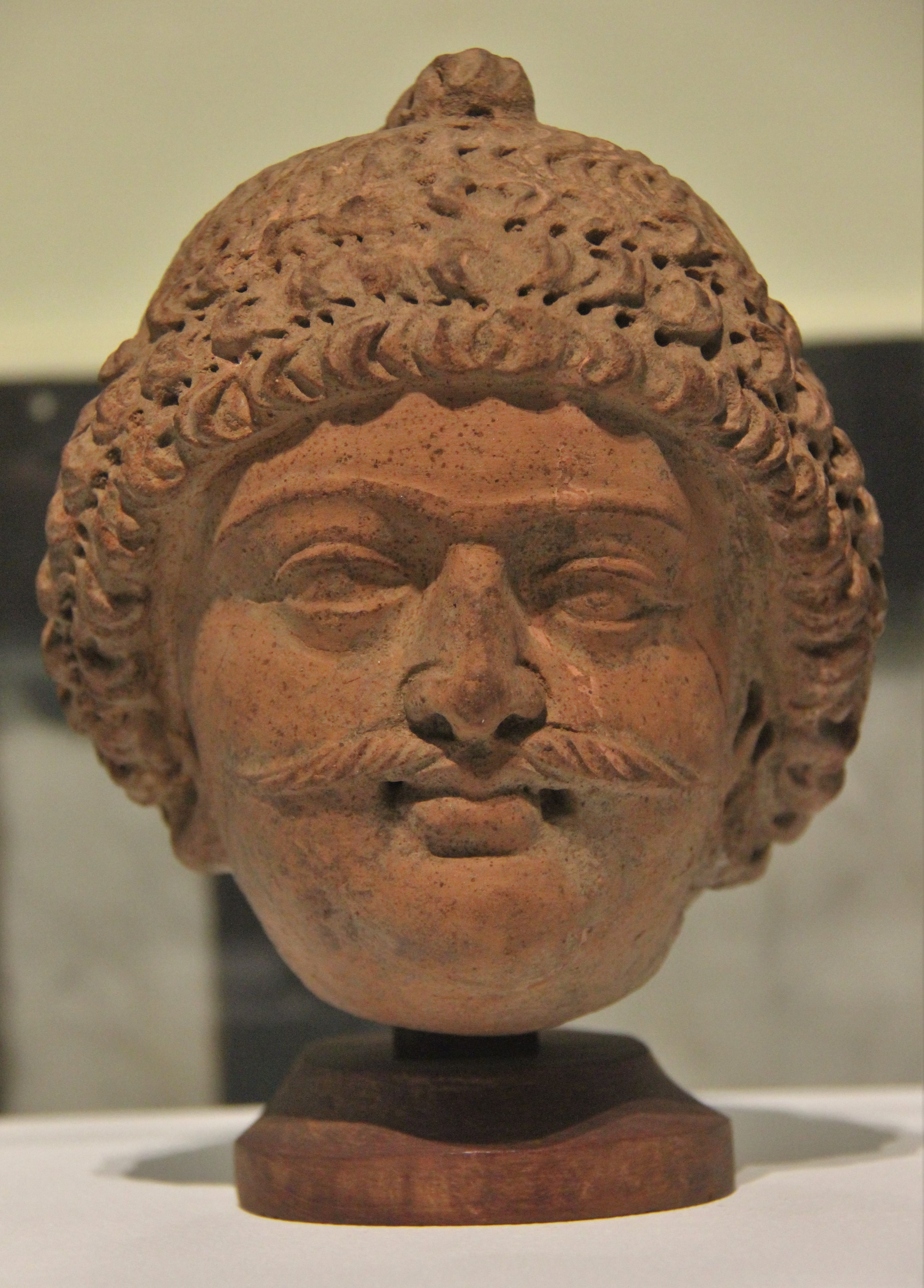
Terracotta head from Akhnoor (Jammu). Head presented to the museum from the collection of Alma Latifi. (6th century CE)

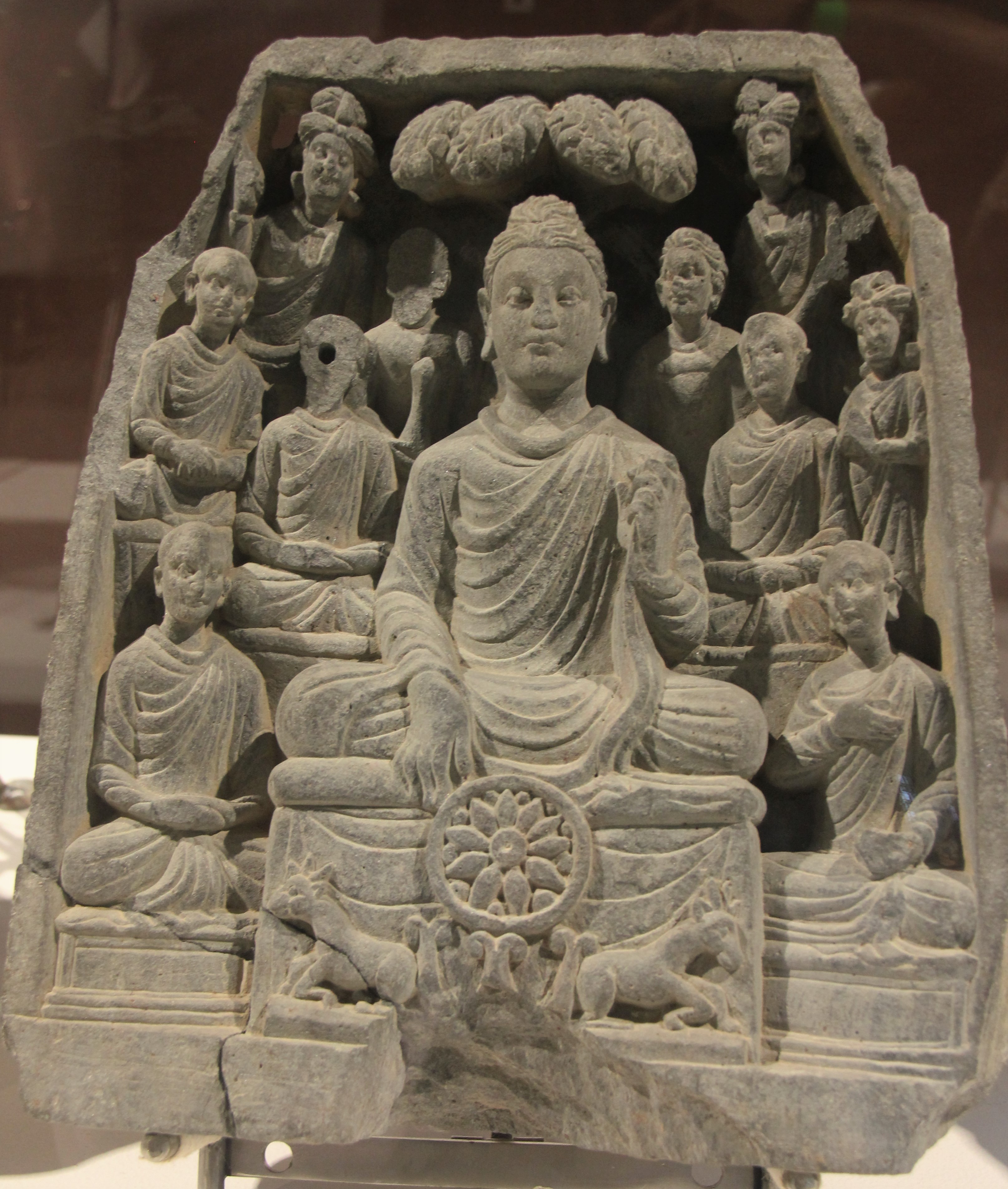
Statue of Gautama Buddha delivering his first sermon in the deer park at Sarnath, Varanasi

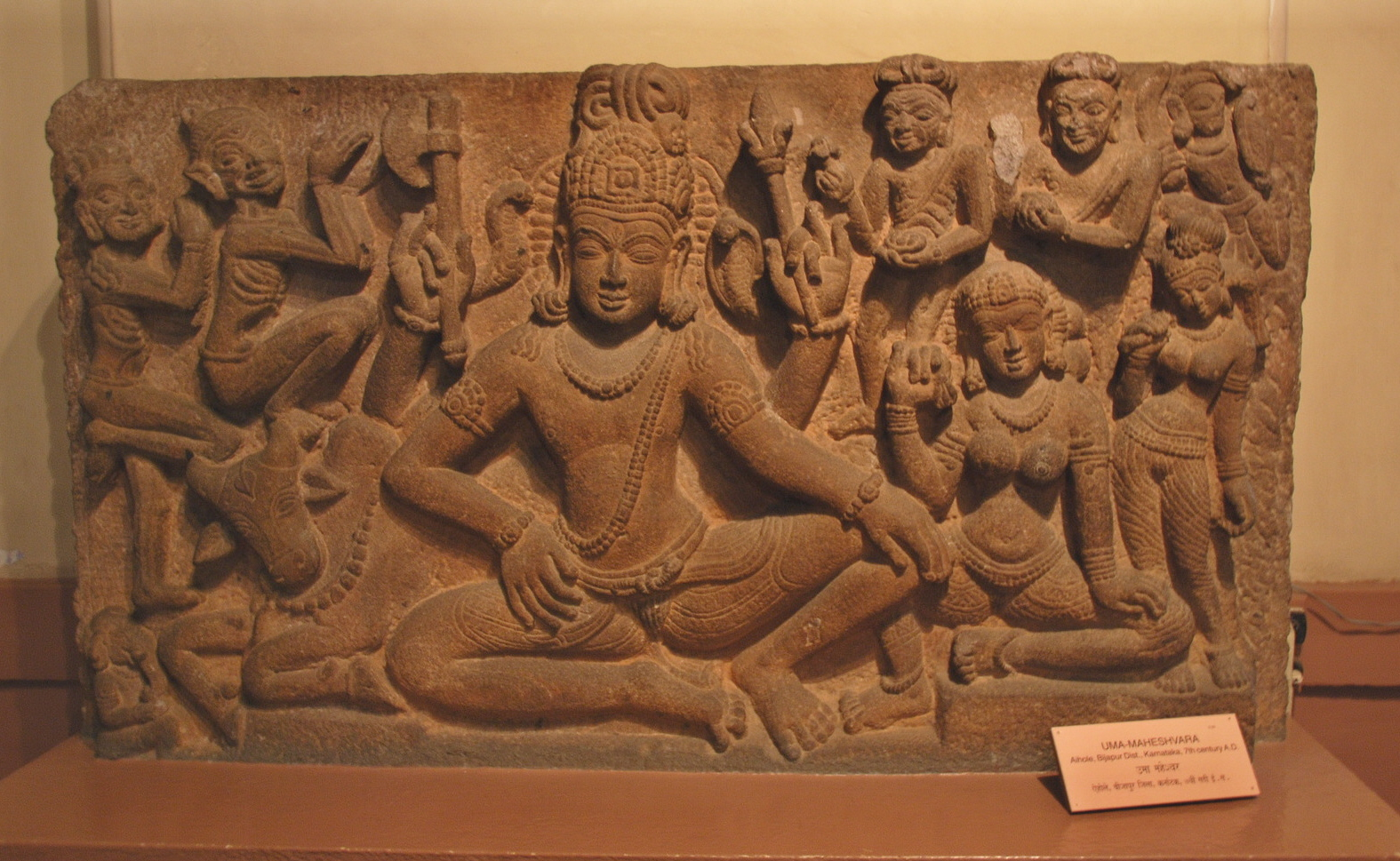
Uma-Maheshvara, Aihole (7th century CE)

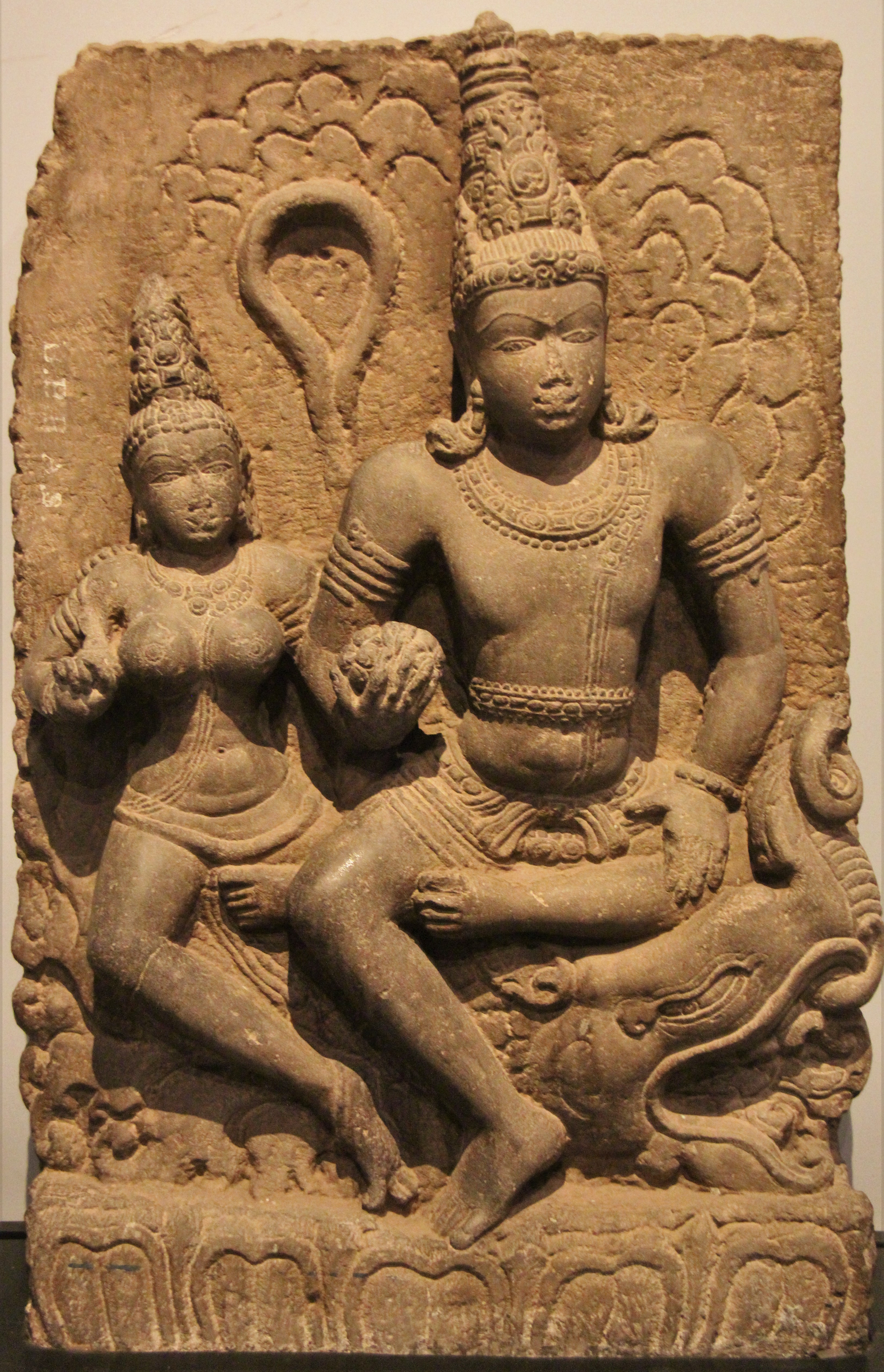
Varuna with Varunani. Statue made from Basalt and discovered in Karnataka. (8th century CE)

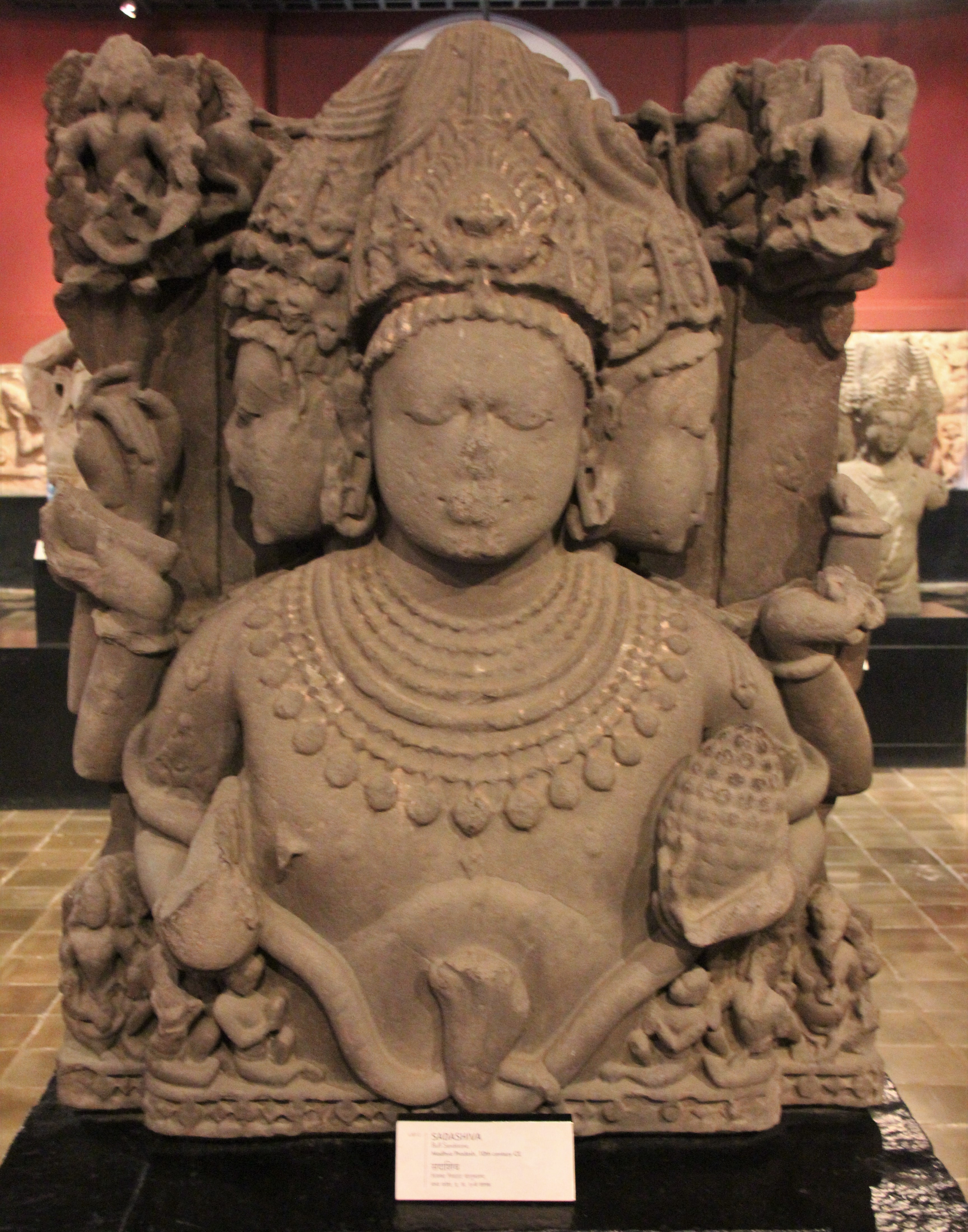
Sadashiva statue made of buff sandstone. Statue found in Madhya Pradesh. (10th century CE)

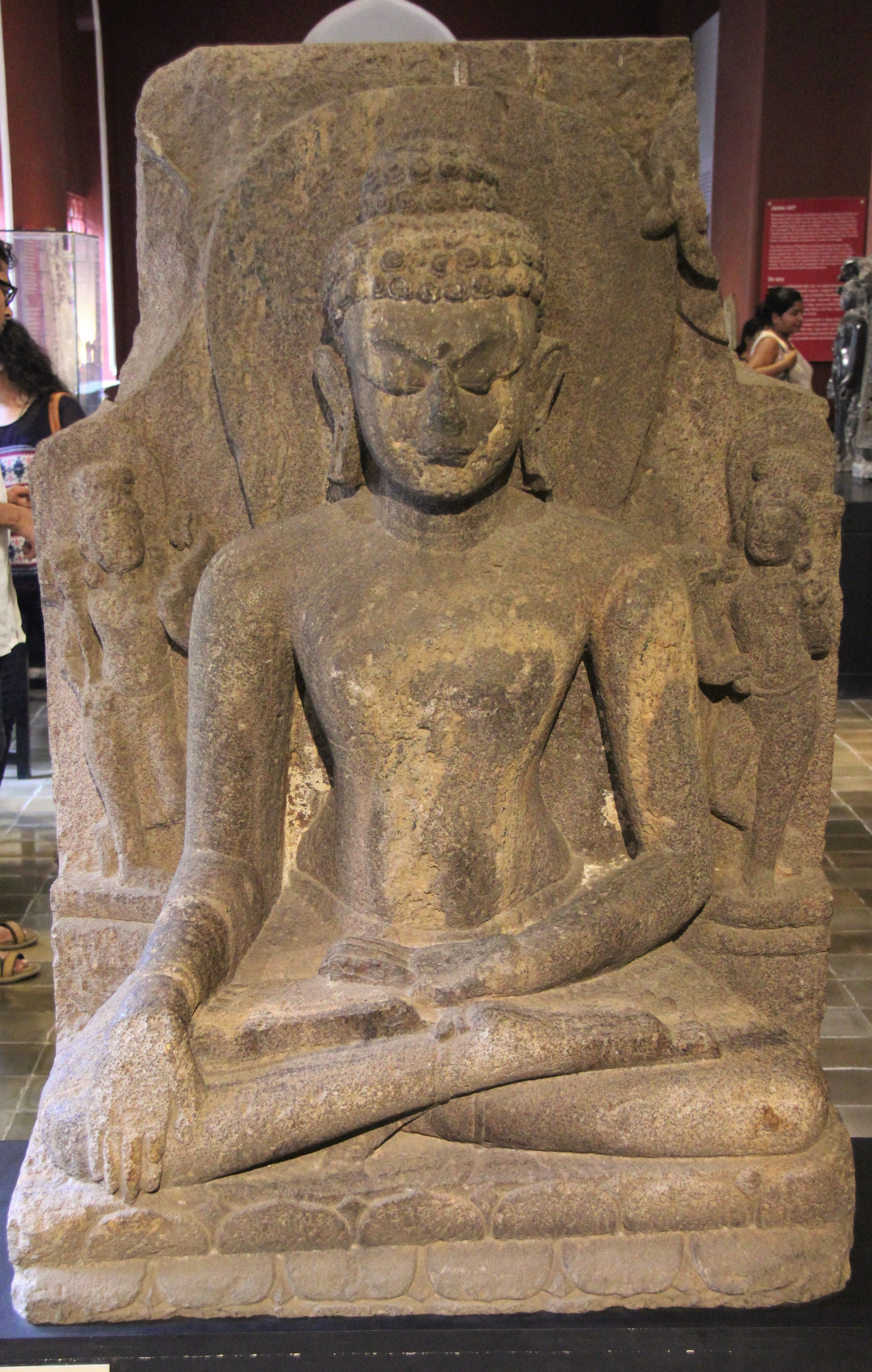
Gautama Buddha statue discovered in the Indian state of Odisha (12th century CE)

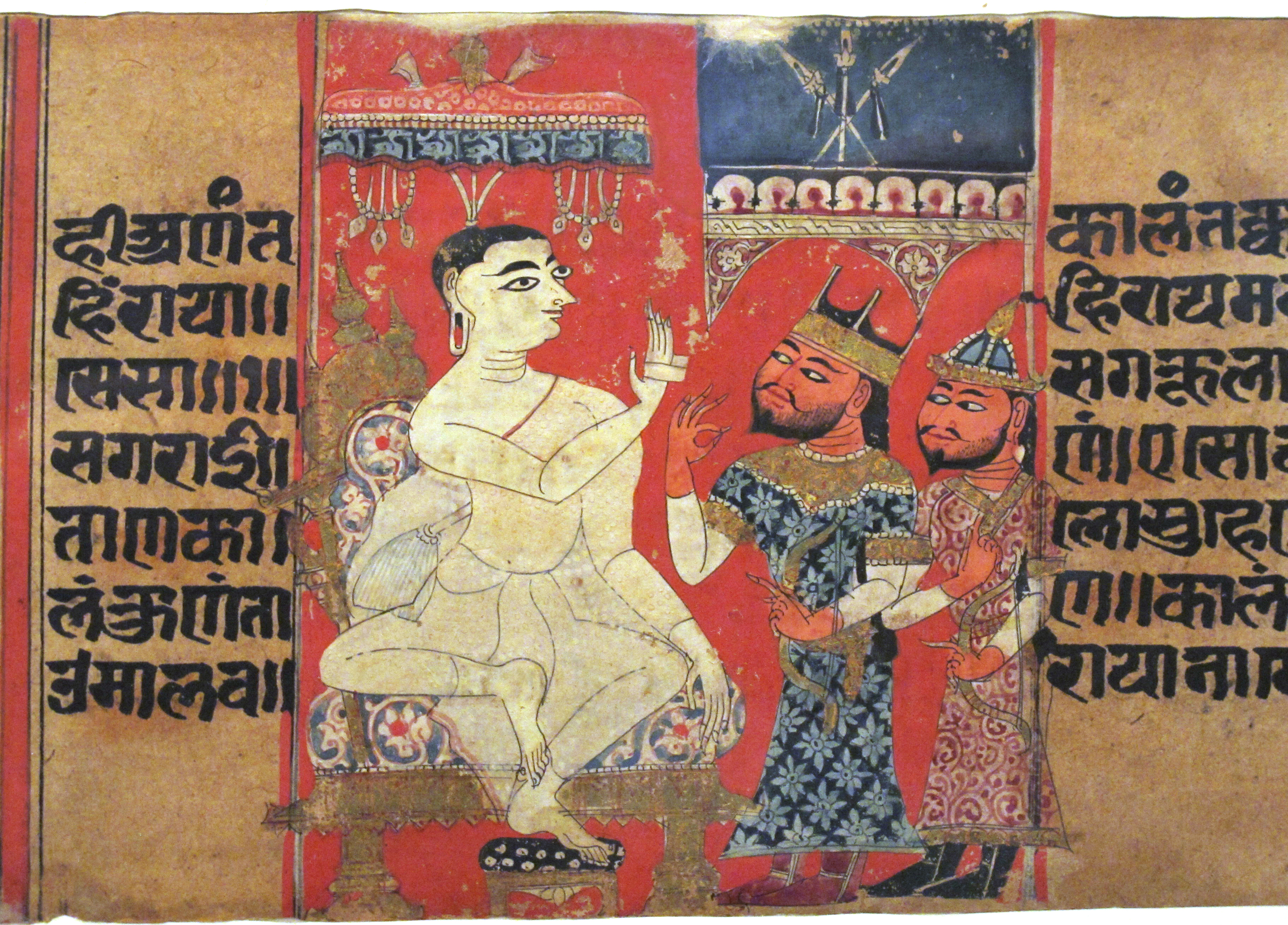
Captive Gardabhilla, Kalpasutra, c. 1375 CE

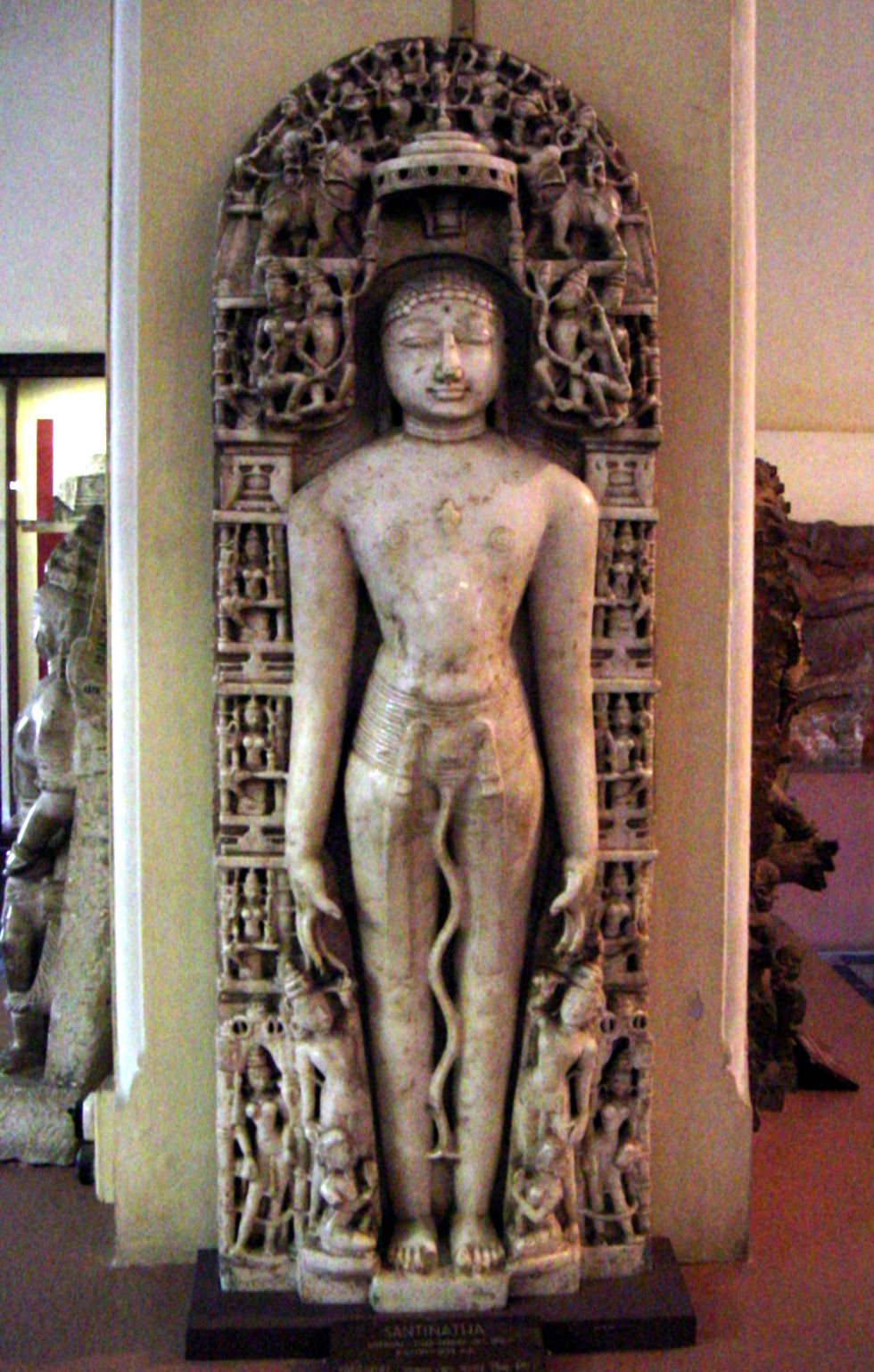
Shantinath statue from Varaval in Sindh (present day Pakistan)

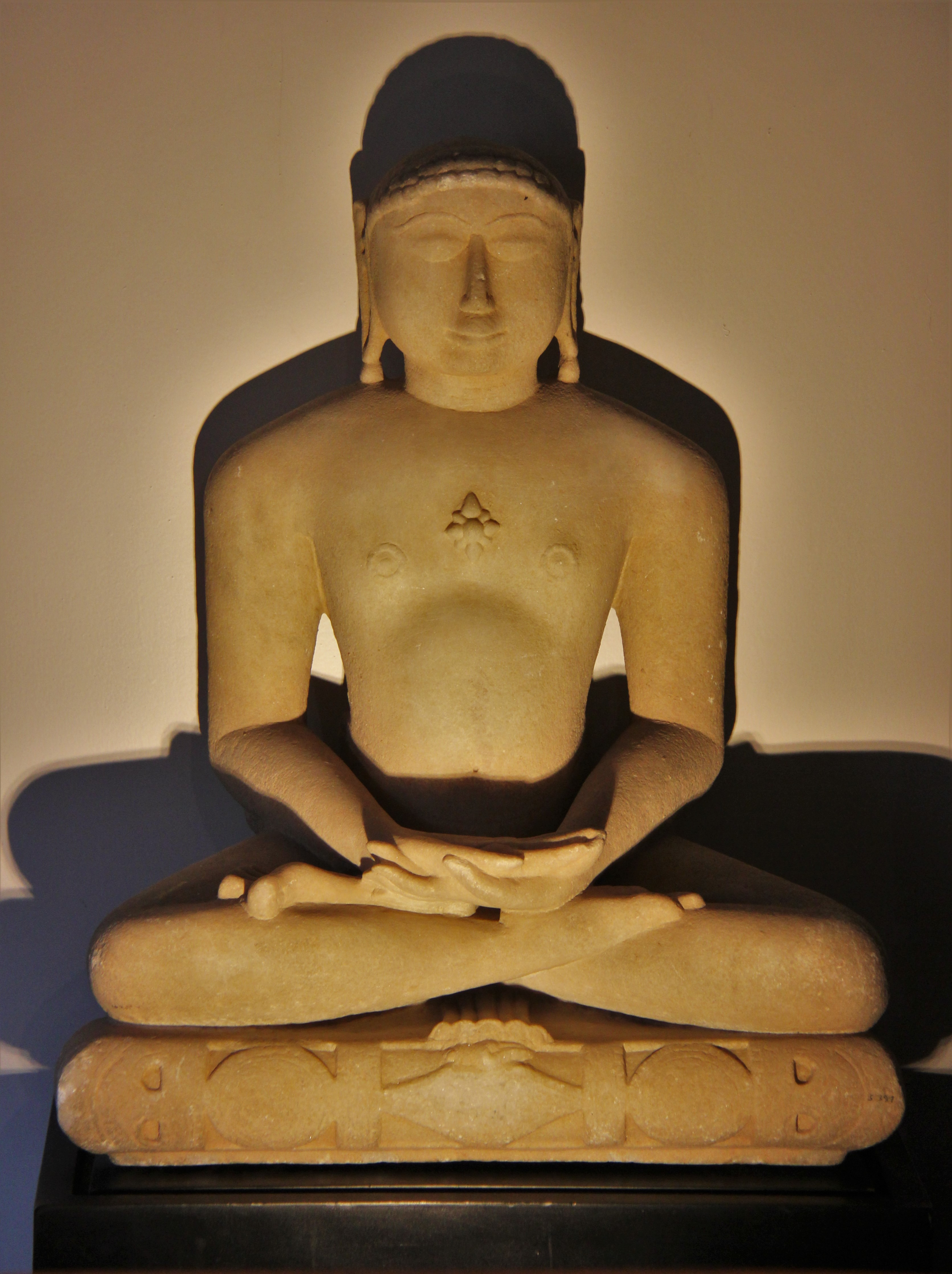
Tirthankara statue, marble, late medieval period, Gujarat

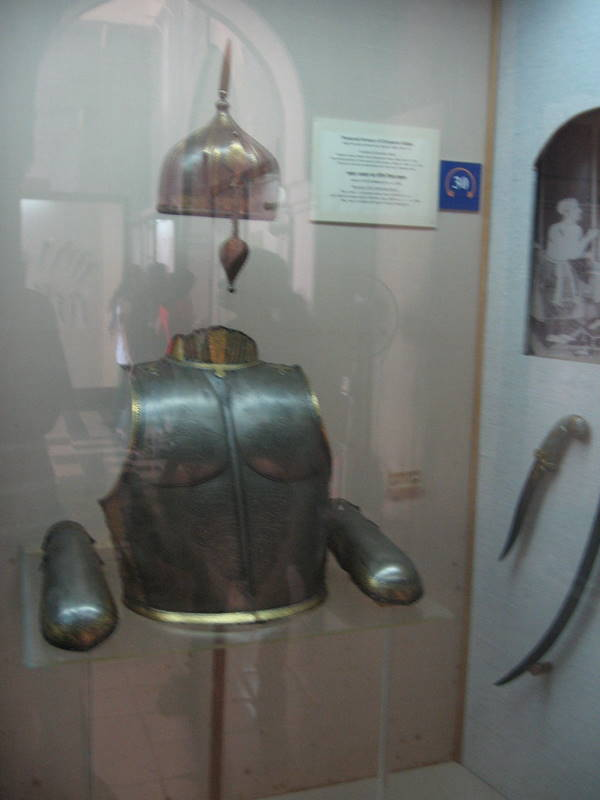
Akbar's amrour

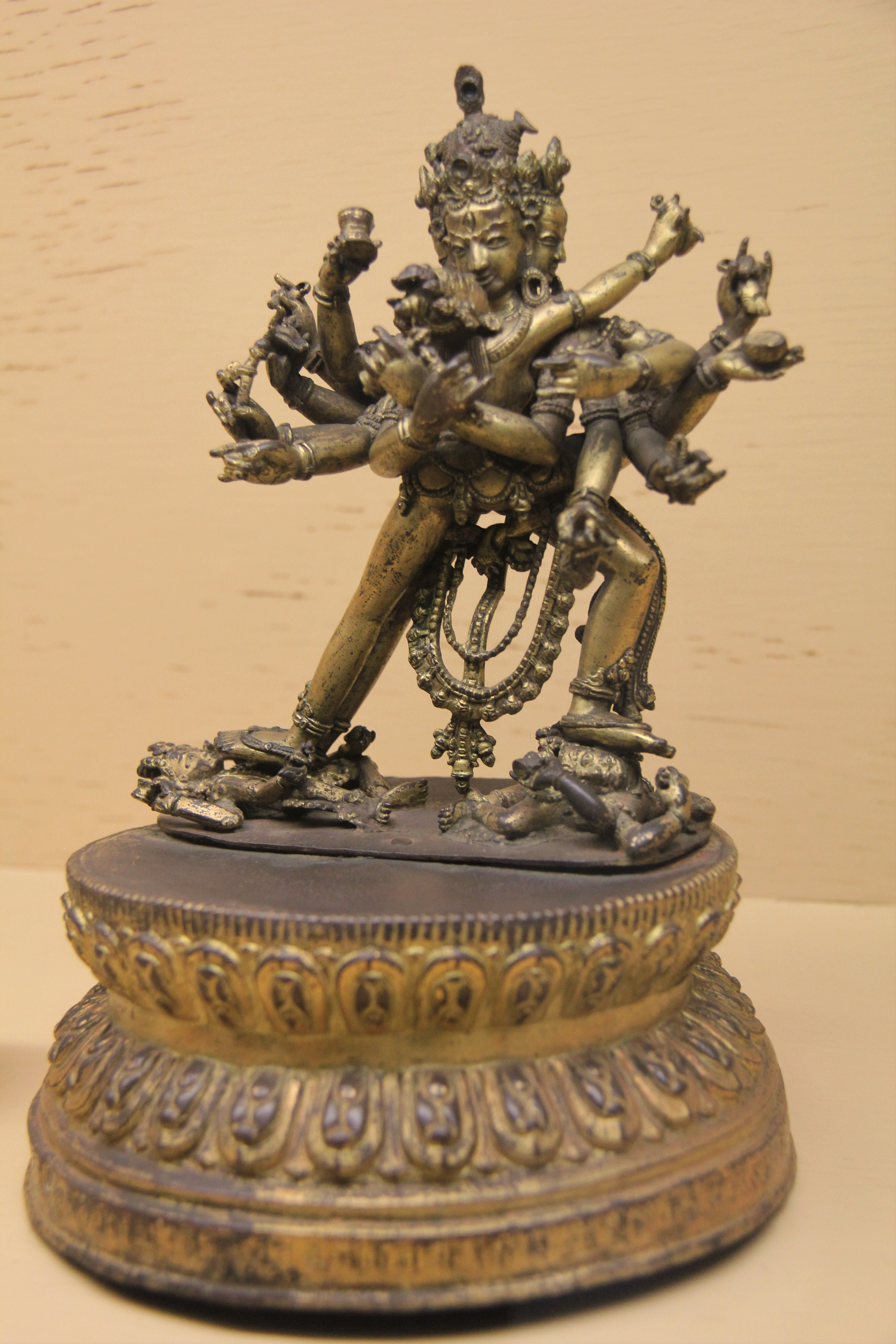
Heruka (in Yab-Yum form) is one of the nine deities emanating from Dhyani Buddha Akshobhya, Nepal, 1544 AD.

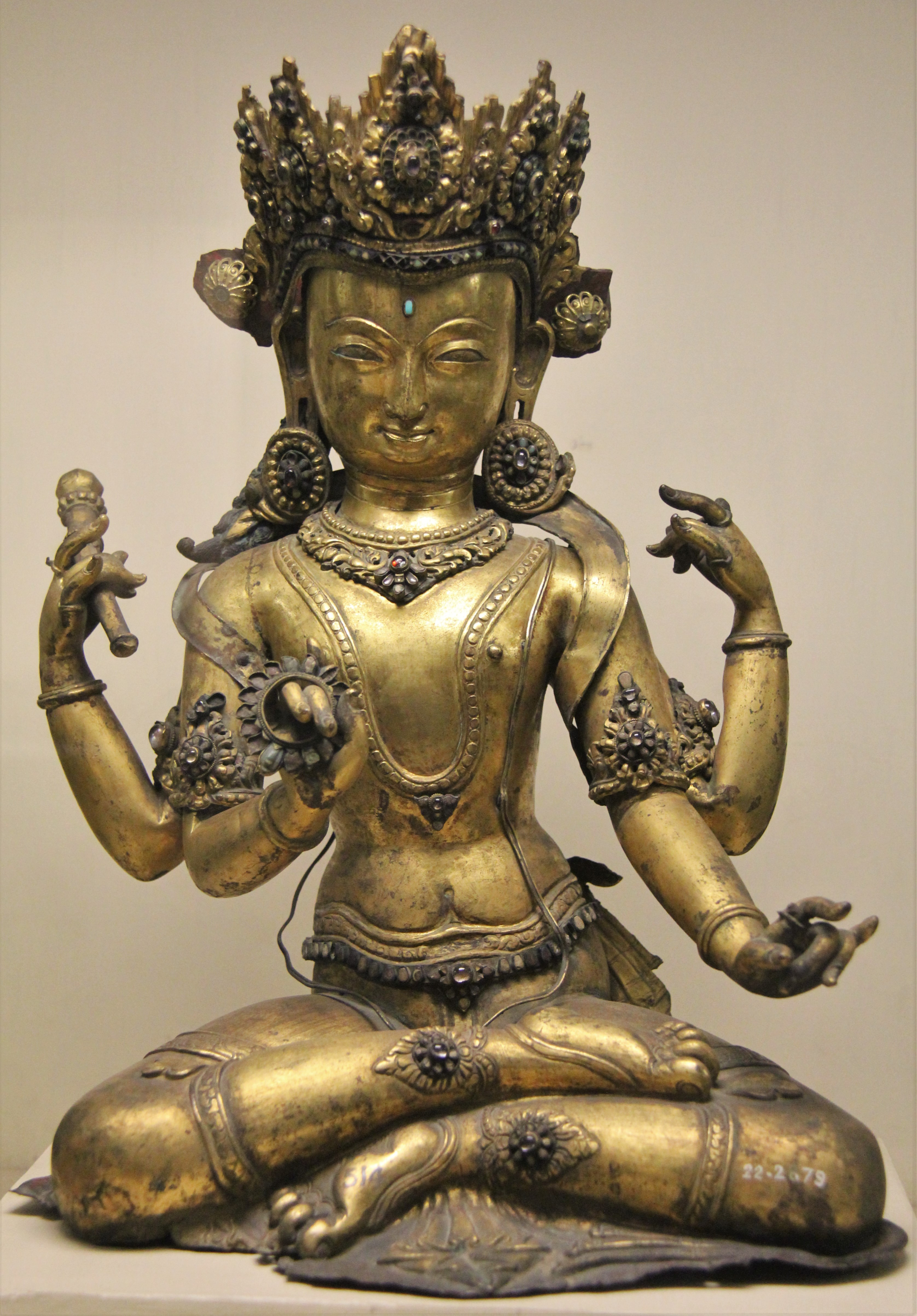
Vishnu statue originating from Nepal and was a part of Ratan Tata collection (18th century CE)

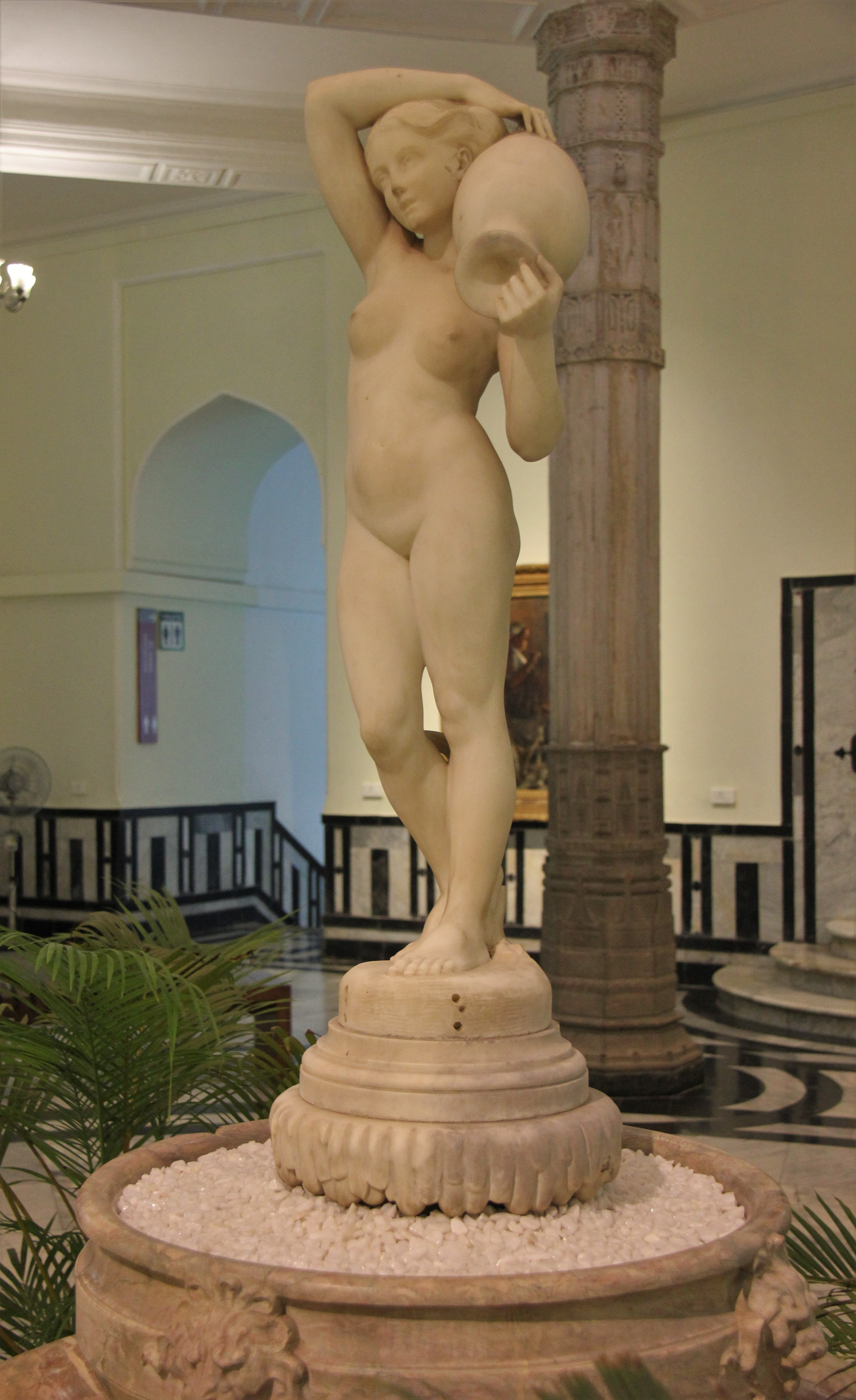
Marble statue based on The Source by Jean Ingres. Statue was formerly on display in Musee du Louvre.

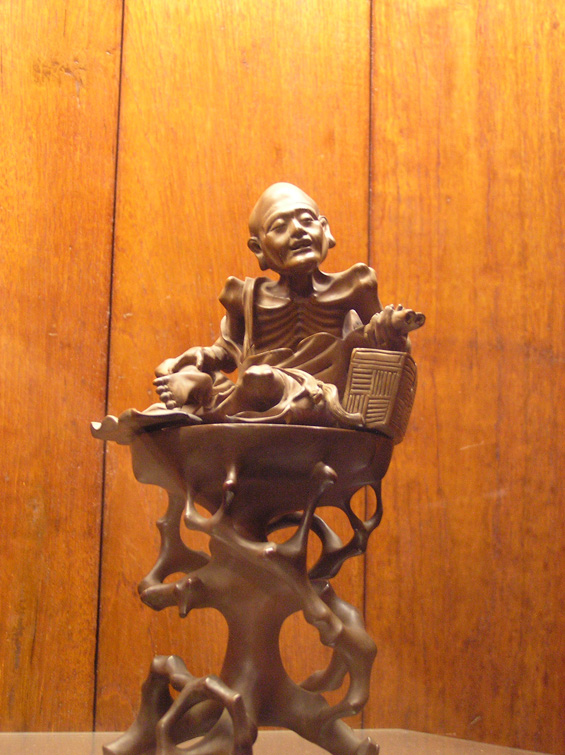
Japanese sculpture

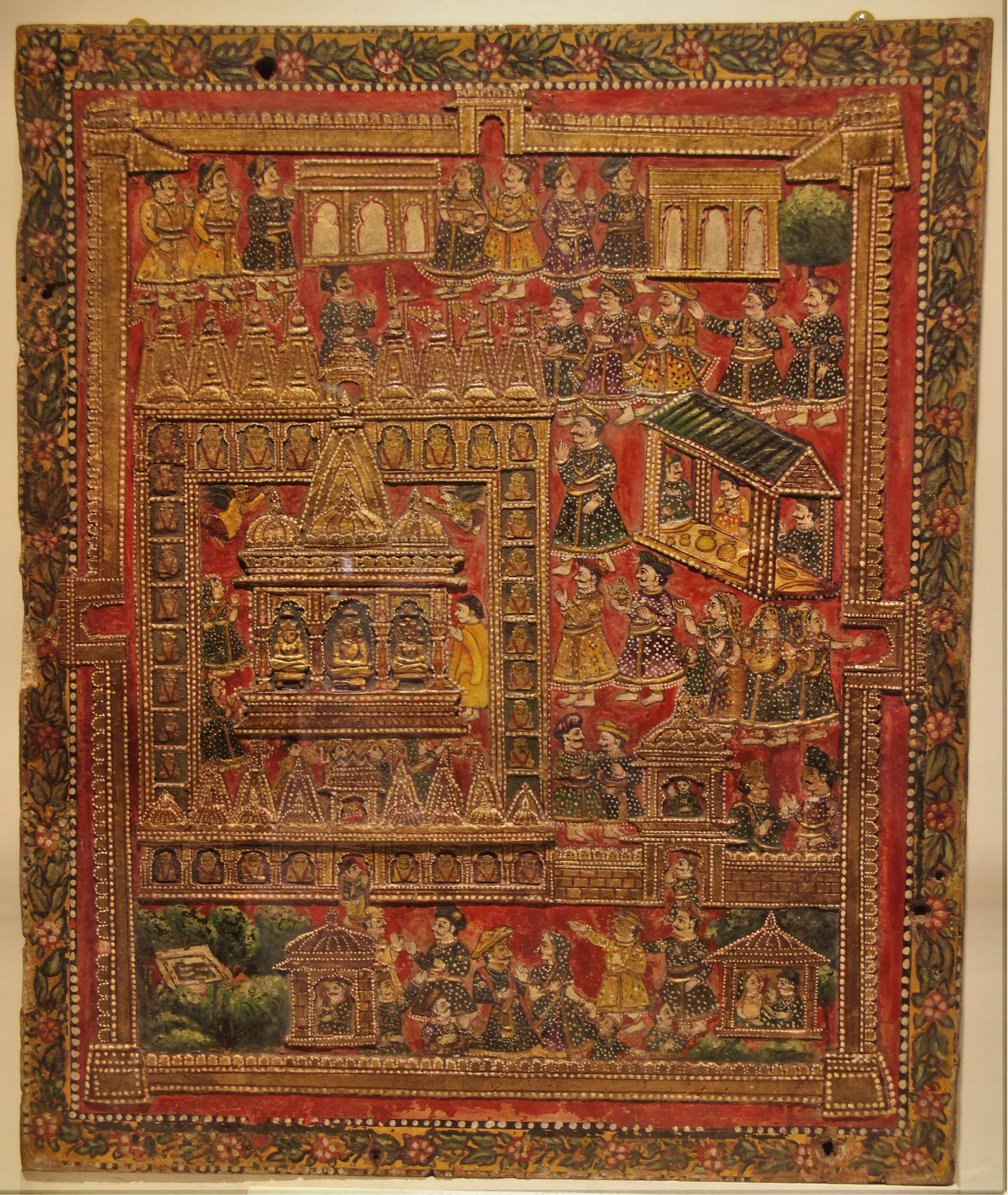
Śvētāmbara Jainism Tirthapata (20th century CE)
