= Parel Relief =

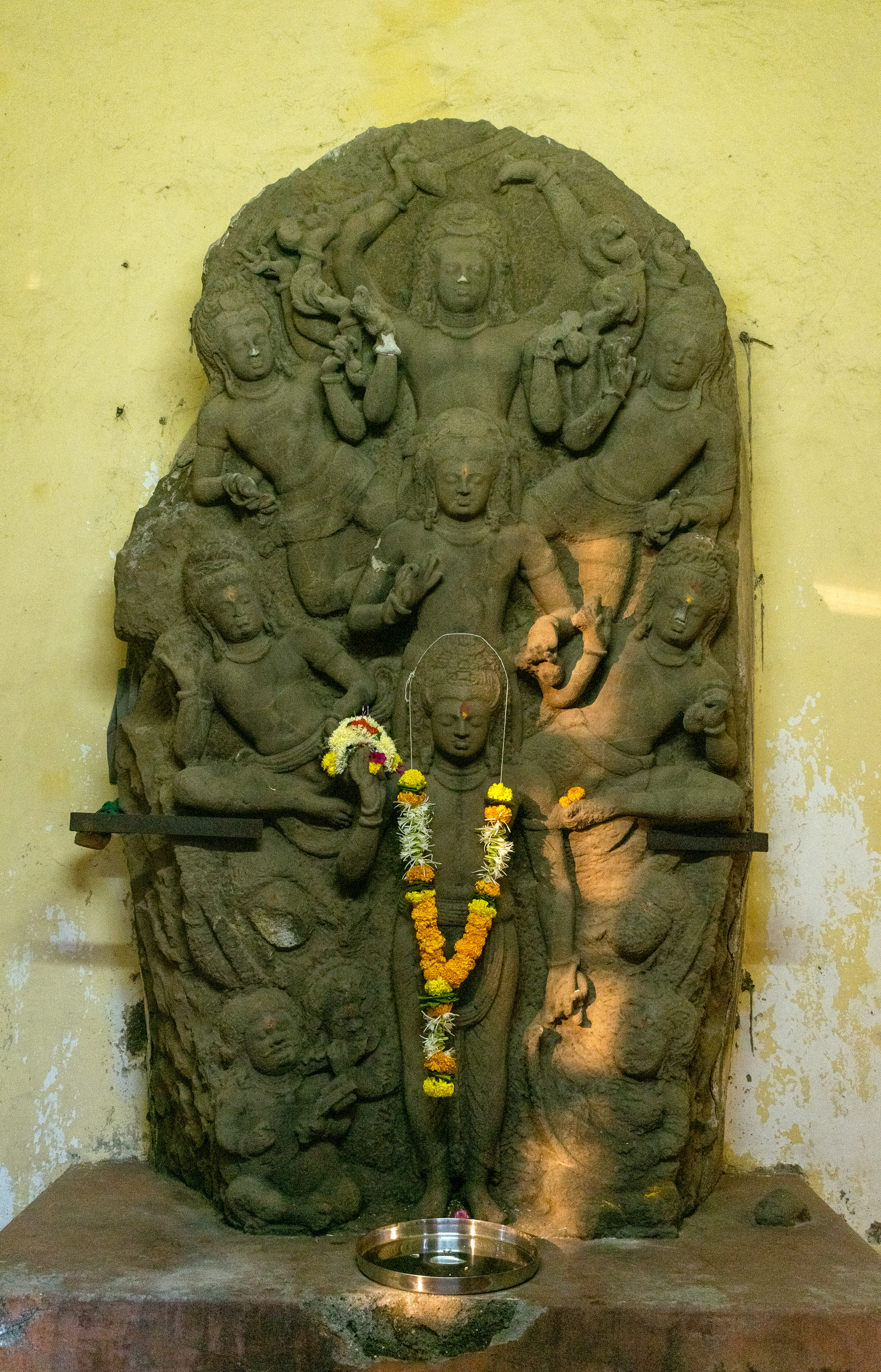
The Parel Relief, 5th or 6th century

The Parel Relief or Parel Shiva is an important monolithic relief of the Hindu god Shiva in seven forms that is dated by the Archaeological Survey of India (ASI) to the late Gupta period, in the 5th or 6th century AD.

It was found in Parel, once one of the Seven Islands of Bombay, and now a neighbourhood of Mumbai, when a road was being constructed in 1931. Apparently at the insistence of an excited crowd that gathered, it was moved to the nearby Baradevi Temple, where it remains in worship, in its own room. It is thought that it fell from a boat into what would then have been shallow water, and was too heavy to retrieve (or there was no one available to pay for that operation). There is a plaster cast on display in the Chhatrapati Shivaji Maharaj Vastu Sangrahalaya (formerly the Prince of Wales Museum) in Mumbai.

The relief, carved in "white granite", shows Shiva seven times, with a central image surrounded by six other Shiva images which overlap with each other; thus it is a saptamurti ("seven images") composition. All are two-armed except for the top figure which has ten arms. The images exhibit different mudras or hand gestures and some carry attributes, not all now identifiable. There are also five gana or dwarf musicians (or three musicians and two guardians) in the lower area of the piece. The slab is about 3.06 metres high (10.0 ft), or about 3.5 metres (11 ft), with the Shiva figures about three-quarter life-size. It appears to be unfinished, for example in the ganas at lower right.

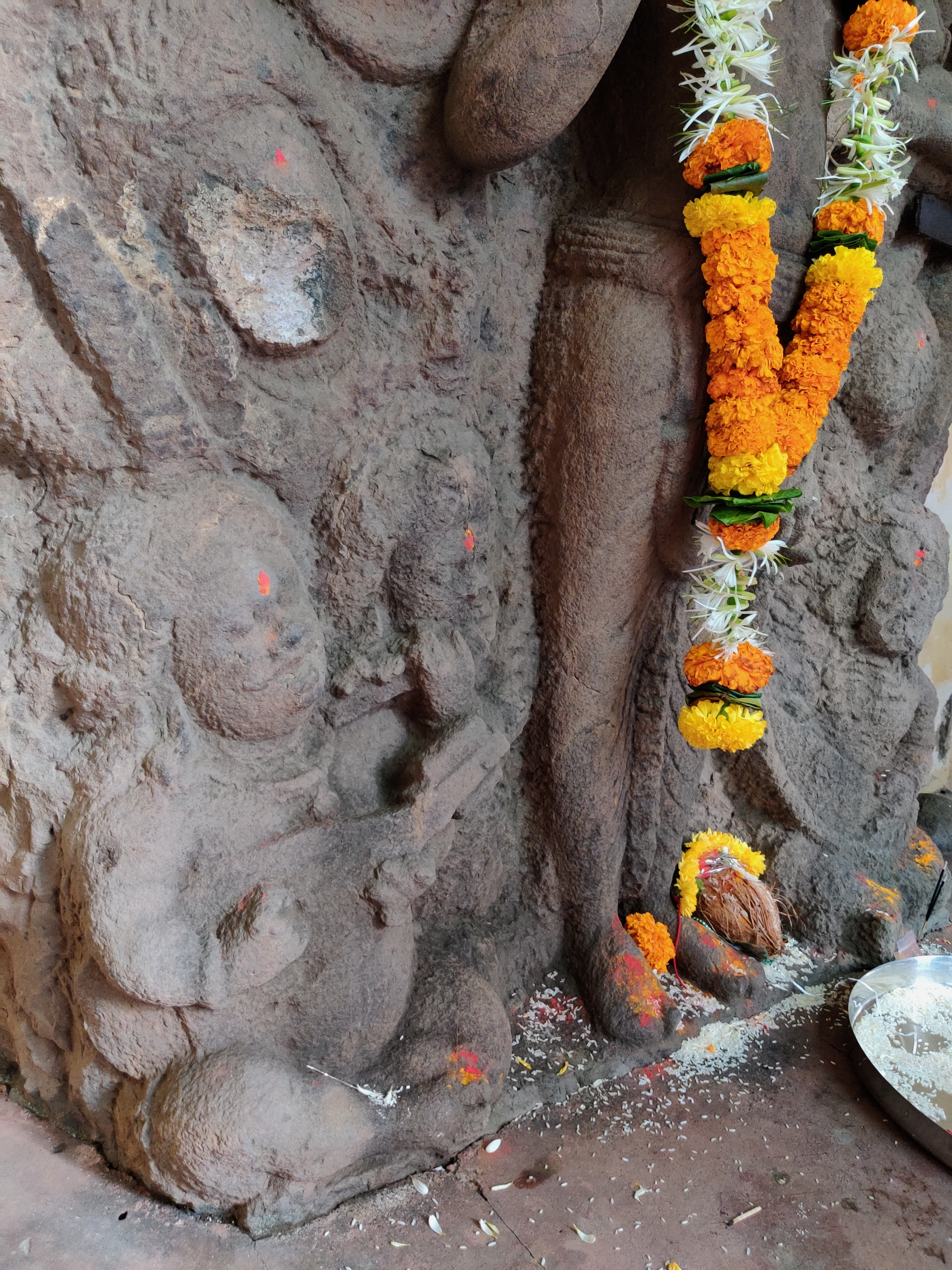
Detail with Gana musician

More precise estimates of the date (all are based on the style) are "around 600", or around 525–530.

== Context ==
Apart from being an imposing sculpture of great quality, and in generally good condition, the relief is of special interest because it comes from a similar period to the iconic reliefs at the Elephanta Caves, only a few miles away across Mumbai Harbour. Despite sharing "both the style and the type of metaphysical concept of the great [trimurti] image at Elephanta", they appear to be by different workshops. There are also similarities to two reliefs from the Shamlaji Caves in Gujarat (very near the Buddhist site of Devni Mori), though in these the central Shiva is three-headed, like the famous trimurti image at Elephanta, and one has twenty-three secondary images, rather than the six here. The less crowded composition in the Parel relief is perhaps more successful. A relief of Shiva and Vishnu combined in Harihara form at the Jogeshwari Caves in another Mumbai suburb is also comparable. It has been suggested the Parel image was carved at Shamlaji (or by that workshop).

The relief appears to be a version, with Shiva rather than the usual Vishnu or Krishna, of Hindu Vishvarupa ("Universal form", "Omni-form") imagery. The surrounding Shivas "emerge effortlessly" from the standing central figure, and the group should be thought of as a single figure showing typical Hindu multiplicity of form in an unusual fashion, and "the god in cosmic form, expanding through multiple figures that extend upwards and outwards".

The German Indologist Heinrich Zimmer (1890–1943) saw the group as a "transcendent Shiva linga", with the three figures one above the other on the central axis of the group also representing the trimurti of Brahma, Shiva and Vishnu, but here all as Shiva, as they are "ultimately only different aspects of the same primordial energy-being". Zimmer wrote that "The giant granite slab seems to be expanding, both vertically and sideways, with the life-force of the athletic organisms that throb and heave across its surface".

== Status ==
The relief was made a "nationally protected monument" (No. 2/3/75-M or N-MH-M5) by the Archaeological Survey of India in 1985. Visitors report that the room is only open during the nine days of the Navaratri festival, but it appears it can be seen through metal screens at other times.

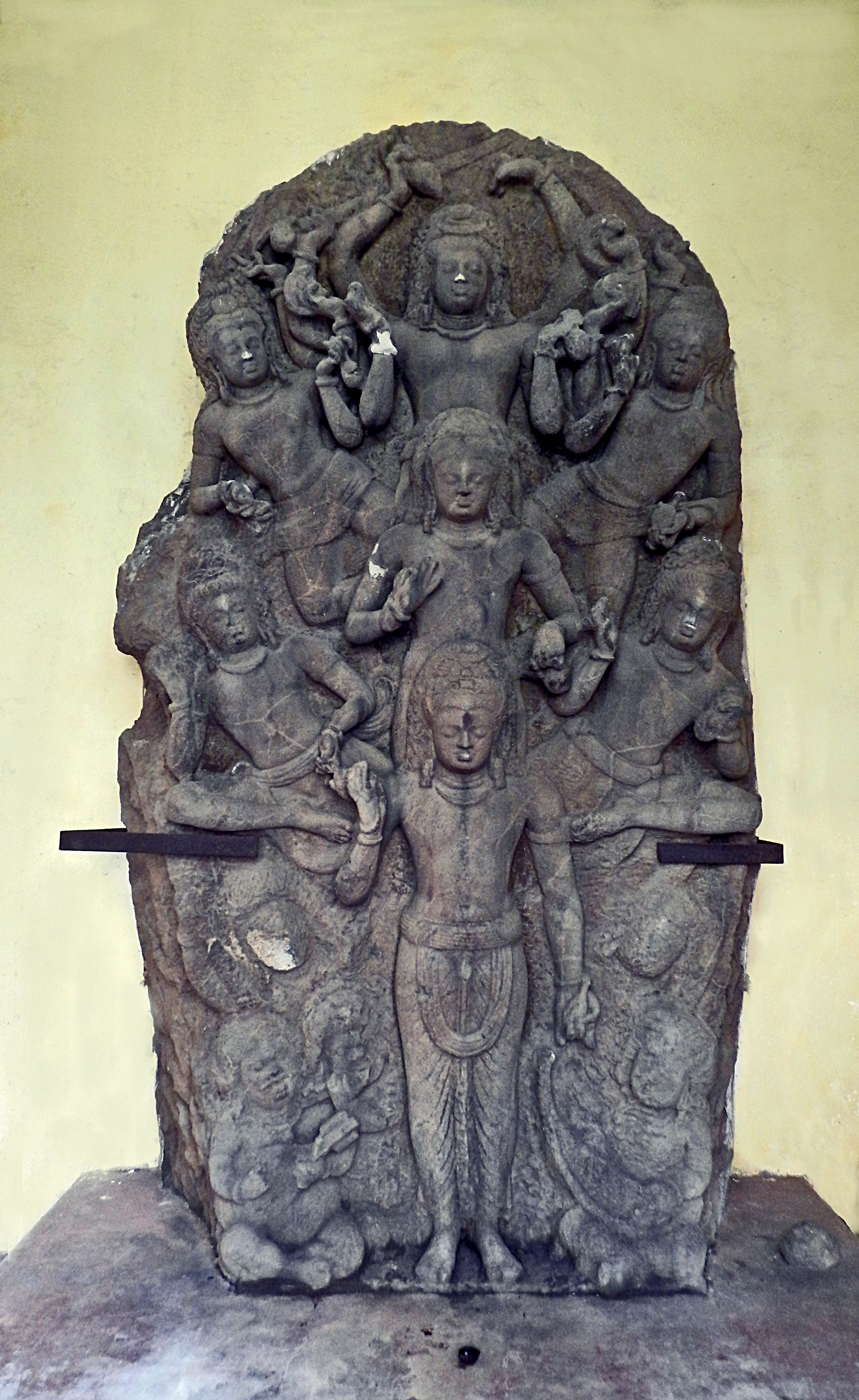
Another view of the original

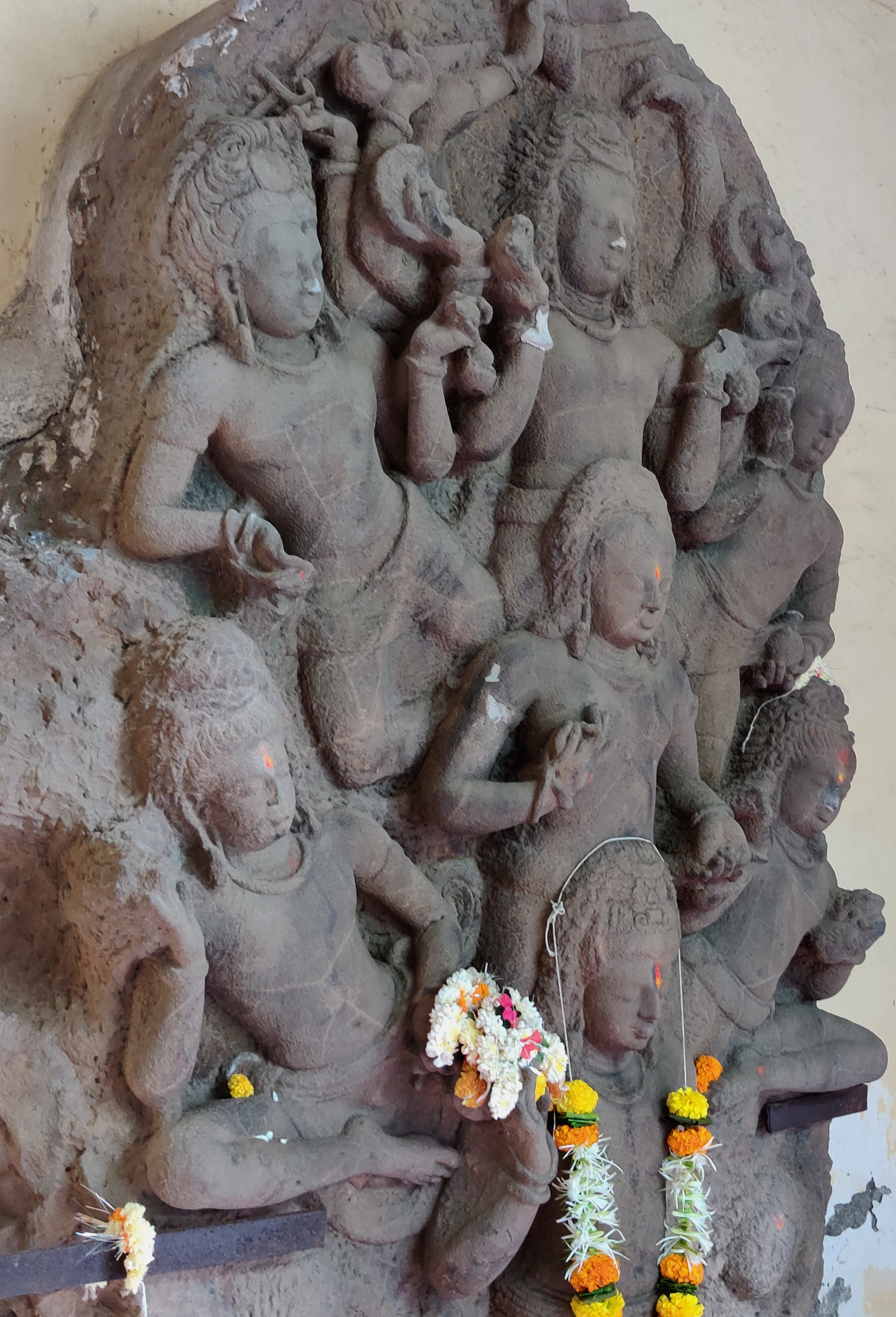
Upper part

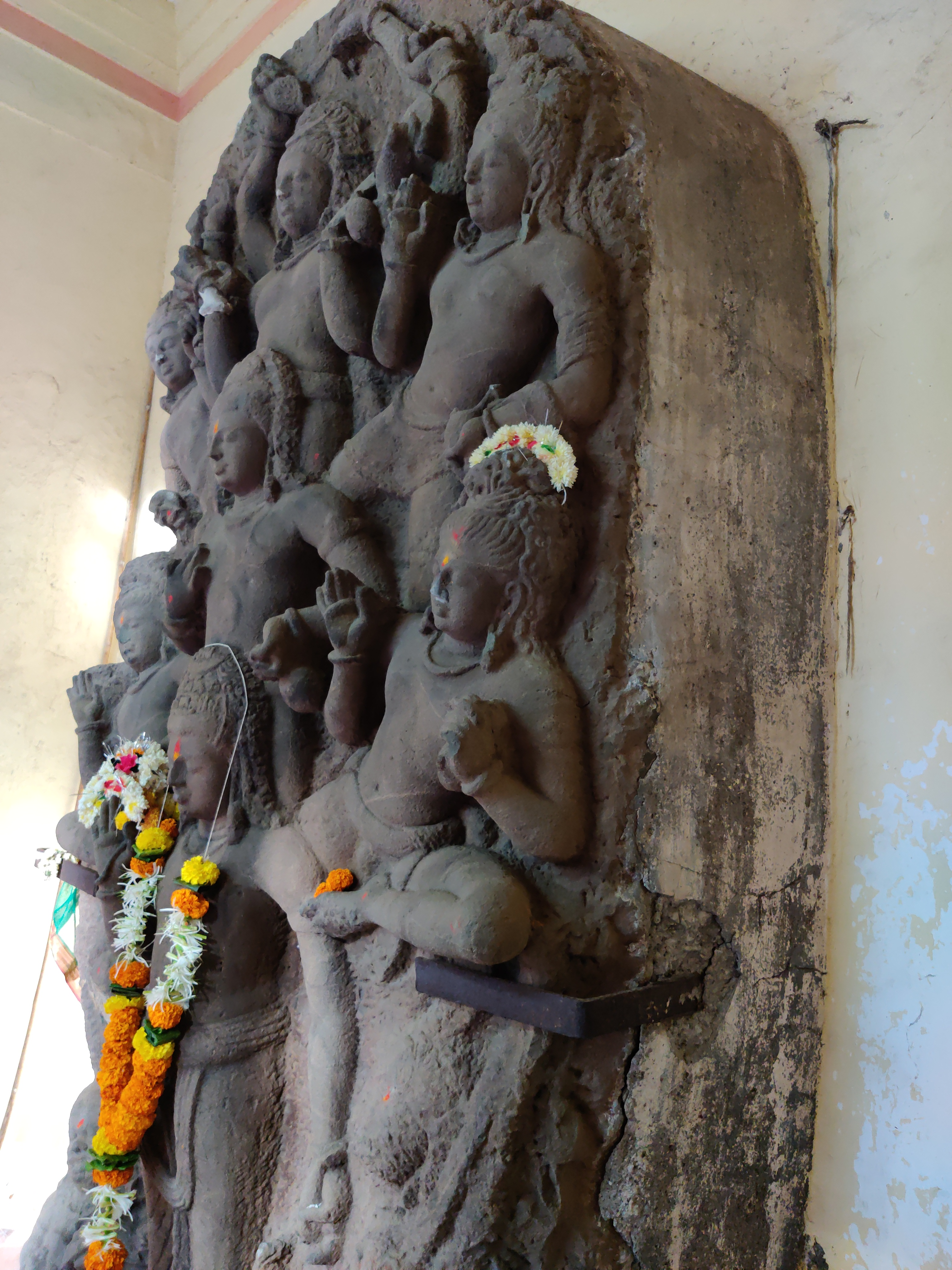
From the other side

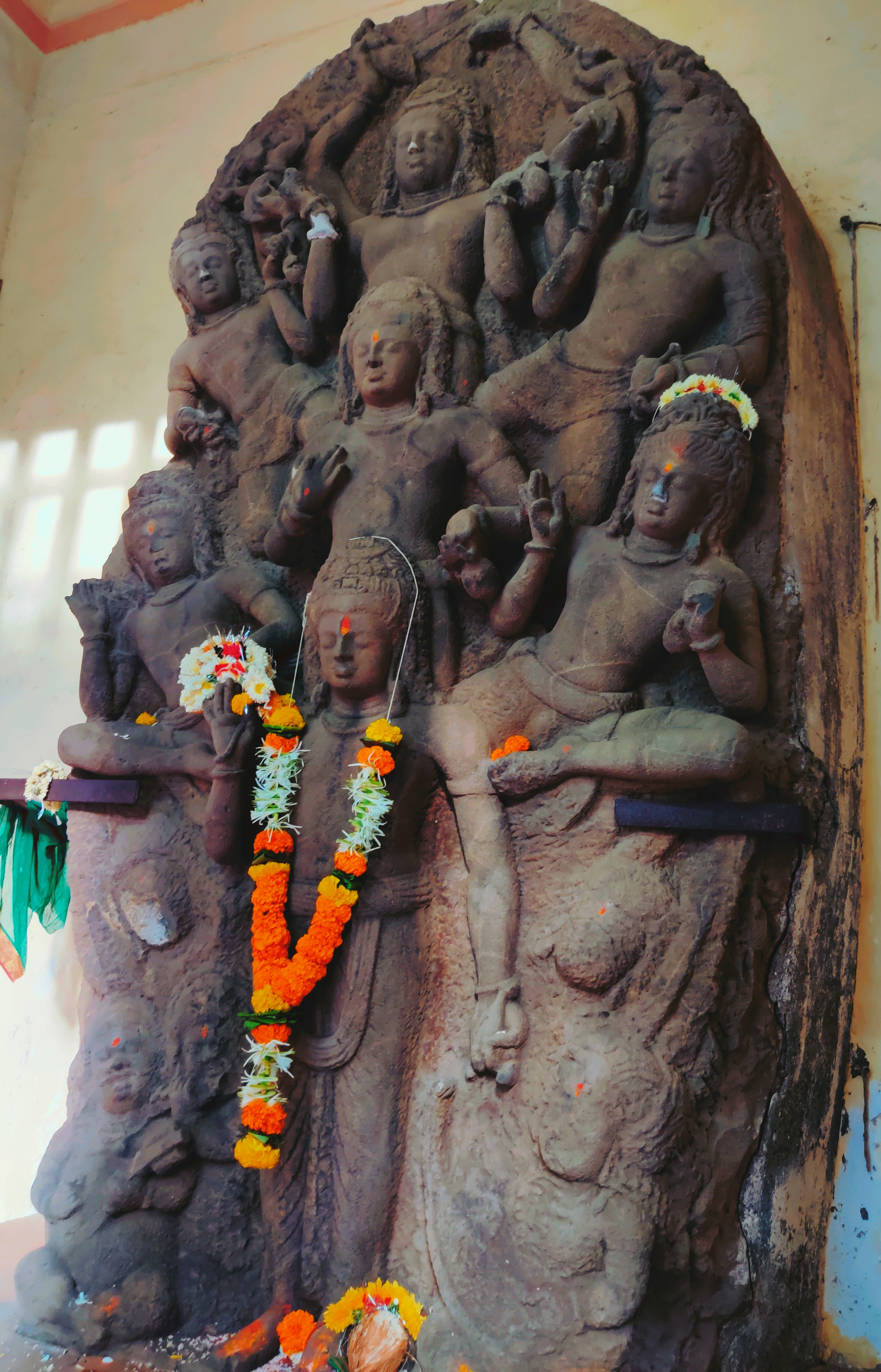
Garlanded

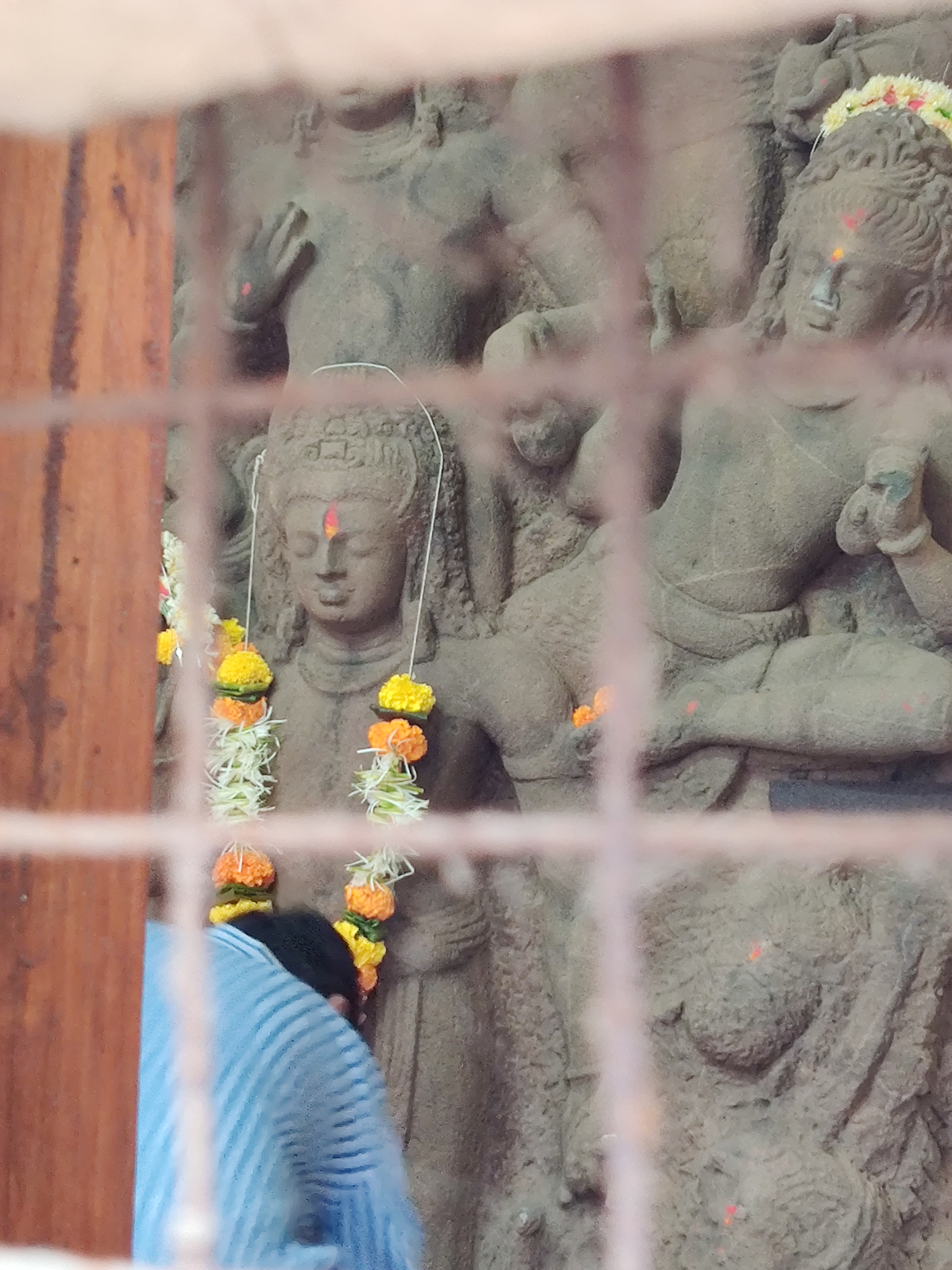
Worship in 2019

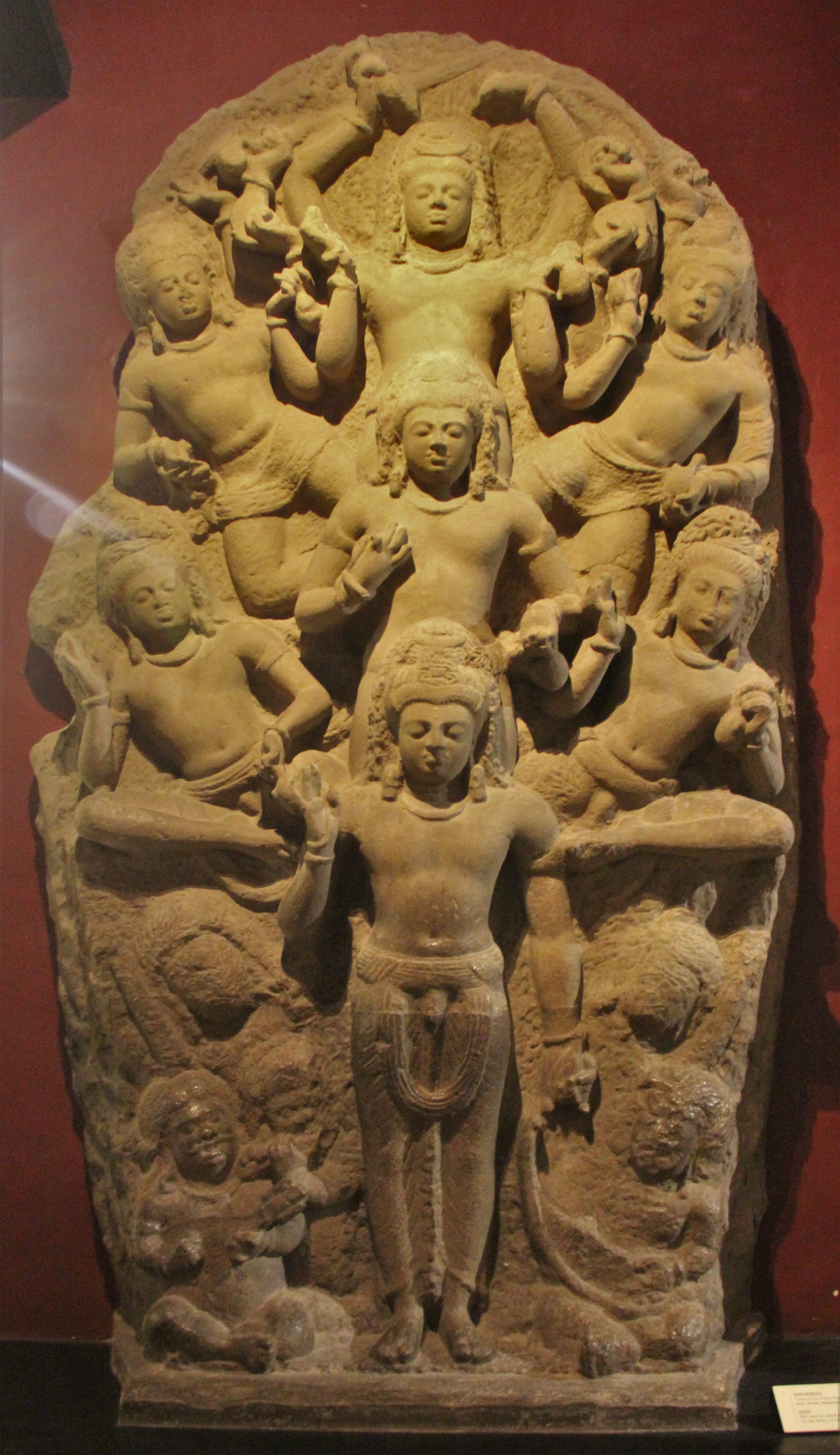
Cast in the Chhatrapati Shivaji Maharaj Vastu Sangrahalaya

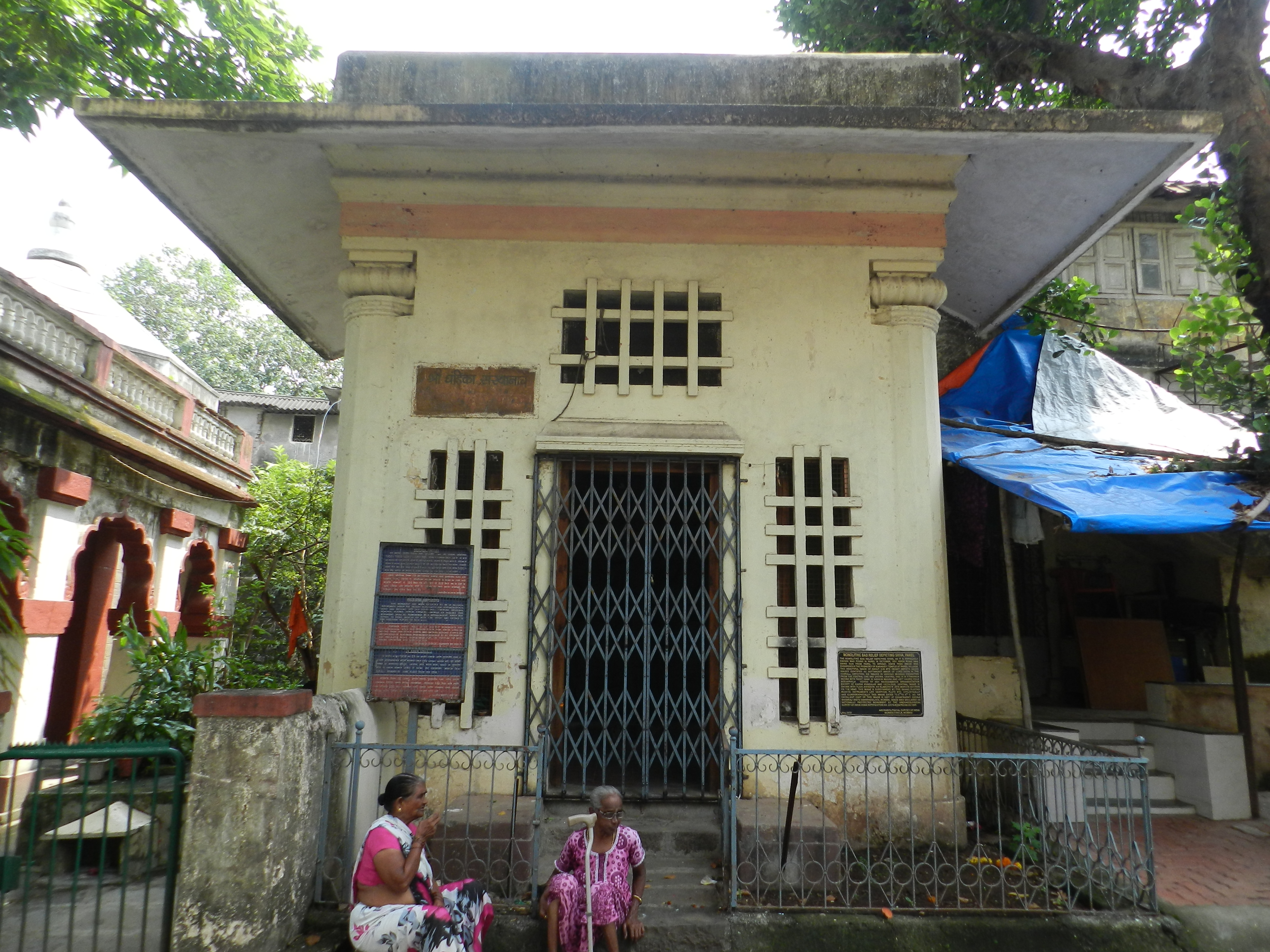
The image house, 2019

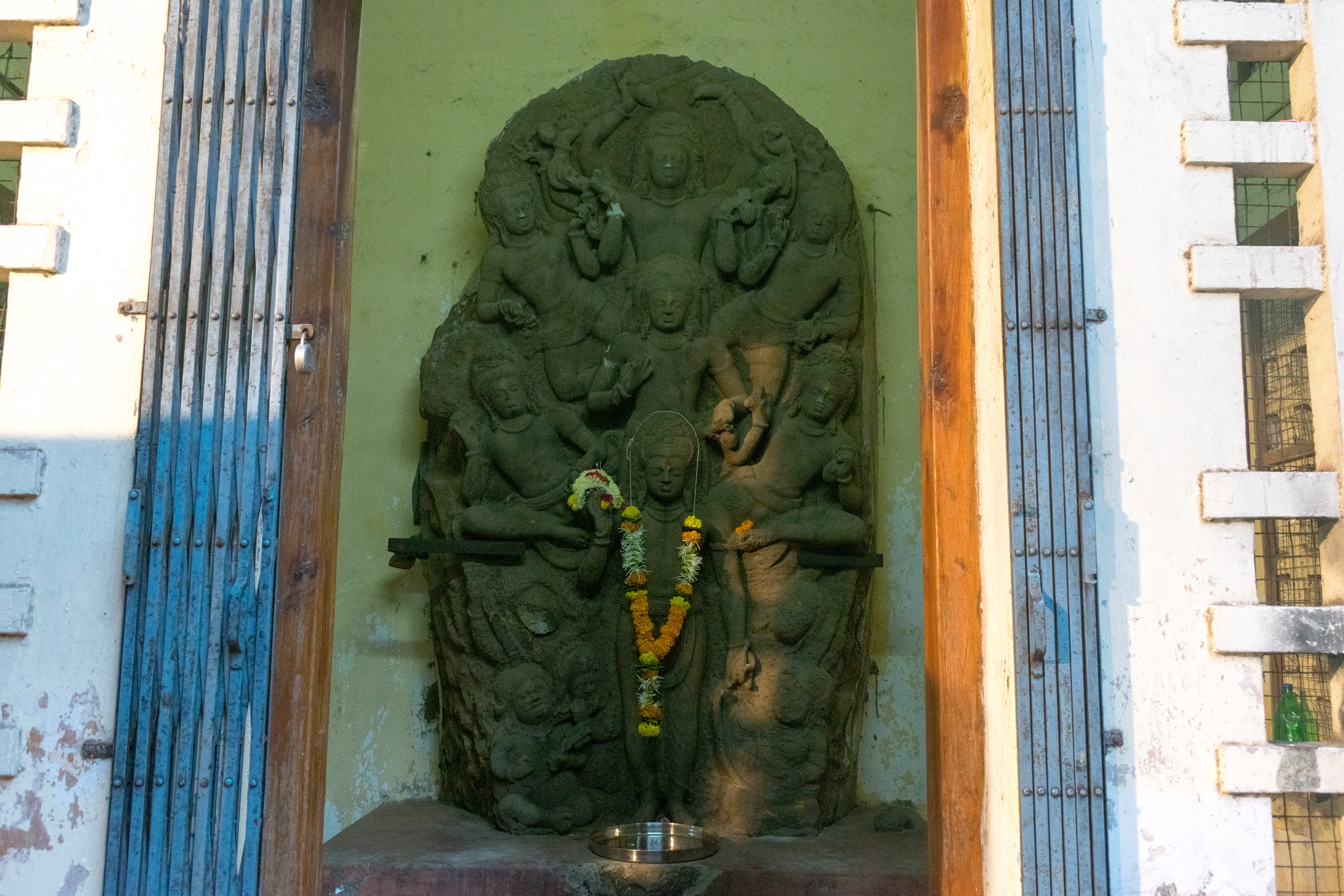
Open for viewing, 29 September 2019
