= S. N. Gorakshakar =

- Born: 1891
- Died: Unknown
- Known for: Artist, illustrator and cartoonist

S. N. Gorakshakar (1891-?) was an Indian artist, illustrator and cartoonist, best known for his cartoons for the Illustrated Weekly of India.

Work and Career

Gorakshakar had no formal education in art, though he was encouraged by the artists M. V. Dhurandhar and Haji Ahmed Shivji. He was fascinated by art from childhood and carved a career for himself as a well-known illustrator and applied artist. He participated in major art exhibitions held in Simla, Chennai, Mumbai and Kolkata. He had his own independent commercial art studio and won several prizes for his applied art.

Gorakshakar was known initially for his paintings in the academic style, which were critically appreciated in their time. In 1921 the Calcutta Review wrote that he deserved special mention as a painter of genre and romantic subjects. Gorakshakar also painted portraits in oil.

In the 1920s, Gorakshakar illustrated covers for the Gujarati magazine Vismi Sadi. Later in his career, especially in the early fifties, Gorakshakar became a household name for his Illustrated Weekly covers. The magazine was published by the Times of India group, whose art director Walter Langhammer encouraged Gorakshakar's satirical vision. In a comically cluttered style Gorakshakar drew hectic scenes of traffic jams, the rains, and other aspects of Mumbai life. He also drew covers for Onlooker magazine
