= K. K. Menon =

Kerala artist

Kizhakkepat Kutty Krishna Menon (K. K. Menon)
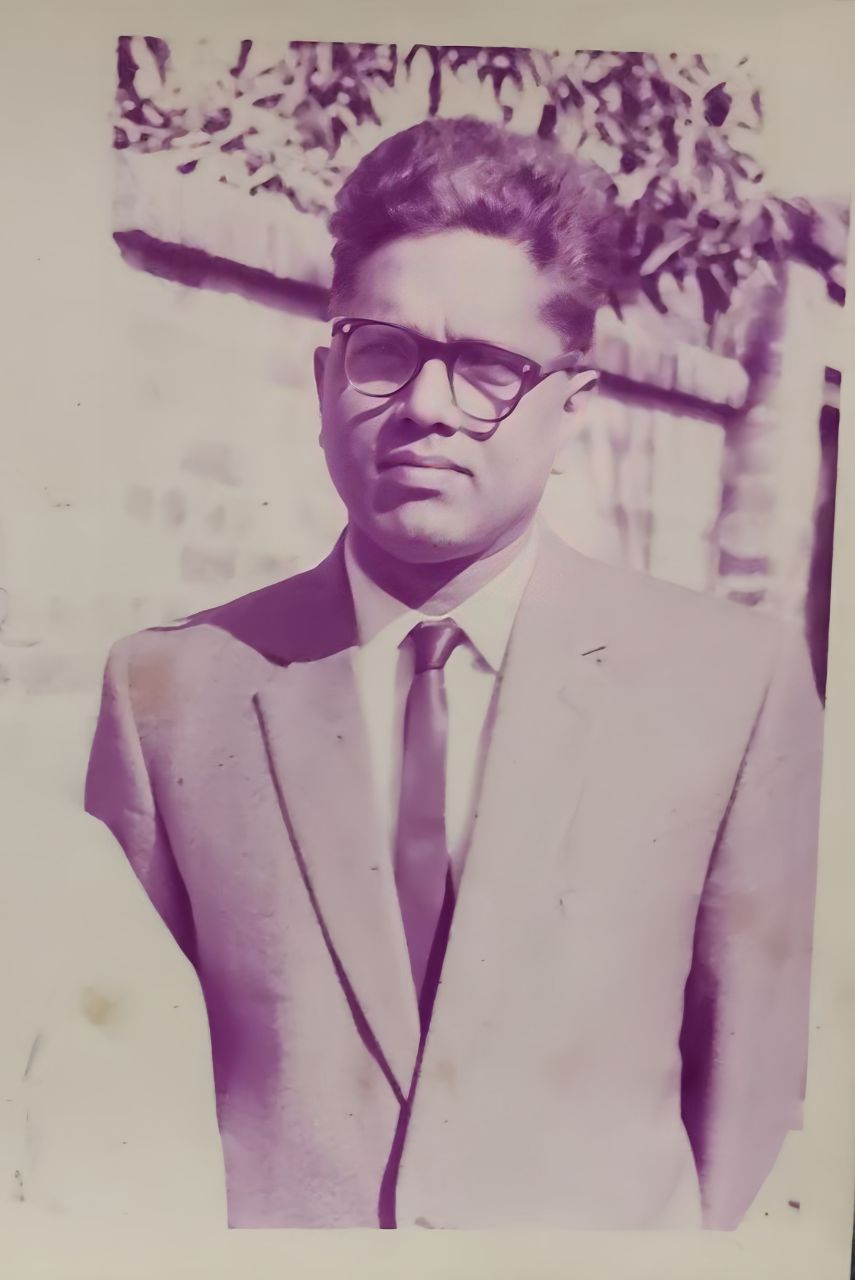
- Born: 14 April 1925; Palakkad, Kerala, India
- Died: 14 October 1999 (aged 74)
- Citizenship: Indian
- Education: Sir J. J. School of Art, Bombay
- Alma mater: Central School of Art and Design, London
- Occupation: Artist

Kizhakkepat Kutty Krishna Menon (K.K. Menon) (1925-1999) was an Indian artist from Kerala, India. Menon was one of the first students to be sponsored by the Indian Army to pursue an academic degree in art. Menon studied Commercial Arts at the Sir J. J. School of Art, Bombay, where he became the youngest person to receive the prestigious Dolly Cursetji Award. Menon later studied at the Central School of Art and Design in London and pursued a career in arts in the Indian army. His work included sketches, paintings, frescos, and murals that depicted the human body, rural living, and still life. Menon's style was versatile, and included portraiture, impressionism, cubism, abstractionism, and Indian modern art.

== Biography ==
=== Early life ===
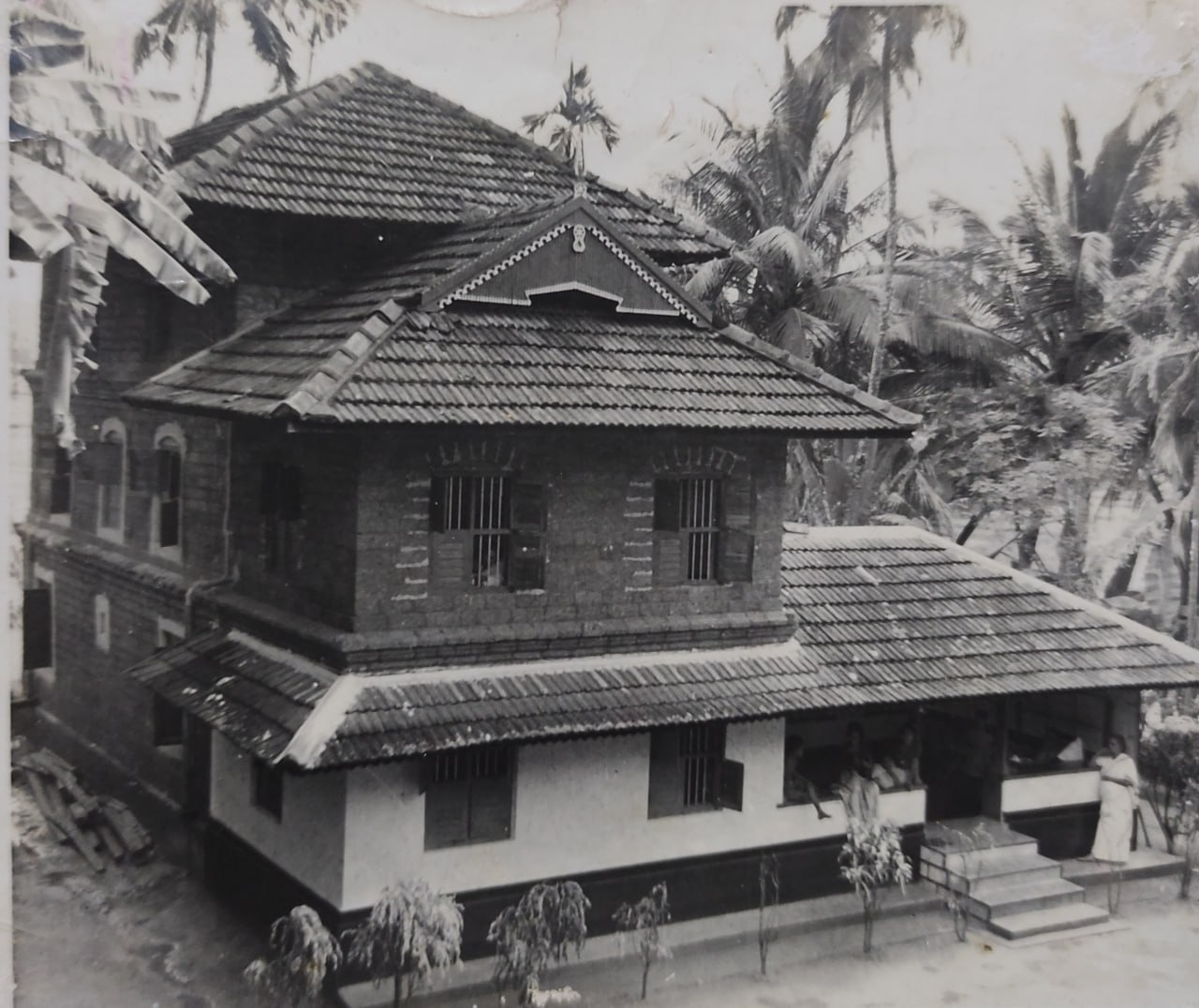
Menon's ancestral Nair tharavad, Thanikunnu Kizhakkepat

K.K. Menon was born in 1925 to an aristocratic Nair family in the Thanikkunnu village of the Valluvanad region in the present-day Palakkad district (in the erstwhile Malabar), Kerala. Menon's mother Kizhakkepat Ammuni Amma was the great-grandniece of Shri. Kizhakkepat Palat Krishna Menon, the sub-judge of Calicut of British India. His father, Paramel Pattathil Kuttan Nair was the first panchayat president of the Pookkottukavu Grama Panchayath. Menon was the eldest of five brothers and five sisters. He graduated with distinction at the age of sixteen from the Chunangad school. As a child, he was a prodigious artist and craftsman. At the age of ten, he created a subscription based hand-written monthly magazine featuring illustrations, named Chithraveli, which attracted the attention of his teachers and classmates and announced his affinity for the fine arts. After completing his schooling, Menon could not pursue further academic qualifications due to financial constraints. At the age of eighteen in 1943, he enlisted himself in the Indian Army.

=== Army career and further education ===
Menon's passion for art persisted during his time in the army and in 1949 he presented a collection of his paintings and sketches in a military exhibition at the Jodhpur Army Camp, Rajasthan. The Commander-in-Chief of the Indian Army and first field Marshal of Independent India, General Cariappa attended the exhibition and was impressed by Menon's art. Menon surprised the General by asking him to autograph a pencil drawn portrait of the General which the young artist had produced. In 1951, when Menon exhibited his works in an army exhibition at Delhi, General Cariappa personally met him and appreciated his work.

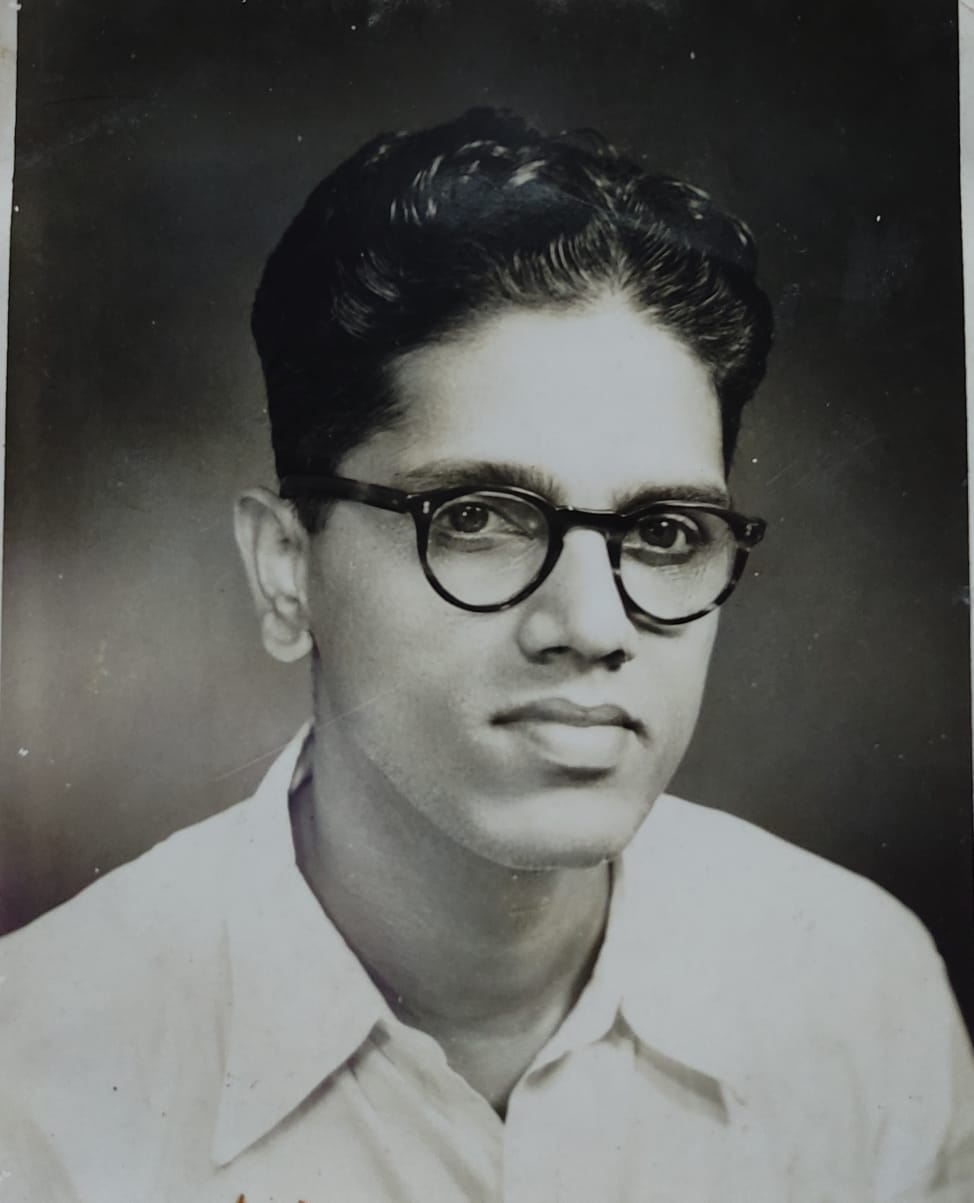
26 year old Menon in 1951 as a student of the Sir J. J. School of Art

Menon's father wrote to General Cariappa with an appeal to permit his son to pursue higher education in his cherished field, with a hiatus from his army duties. General Cariappa responded with a request for Menon's portfolio to assess eligibility for the Bachelor of Fine Arts at the Sir J.J. School of Art, Bombay. Upon a successful admission supported by the General's recommendation, Menon was posted to Bombay from Jodhpur on a Government of India sanctioned scholarship. Although the scholarship was initially sanctioned for a year, Menon's academic achievements secured him another three years of funded study.

J.D. Gondhalekar, then dean of the Sir J. J. School of Art, recommended Menon to the Army Headquarters and India's Ministry of Education for higher education as a candidate for further education in the arts. In 1959, Menon was interviewed by General Kodendera Subayya Thimayya and with a successful admission, was sent on the General's orders to London for three years of full-time study. Menon initially aimed to study at the Slade School of Fine Art under the mentorship of artist George Charlton, but because Charlton had limited intake of students that year, he personally referred Menon to the Central School of Art and Design, London. Menon proceeded to obtain a National Diploma in Design with a specialization in illustration at the Central School of Art and Design.

=== Awards and Achievements ===
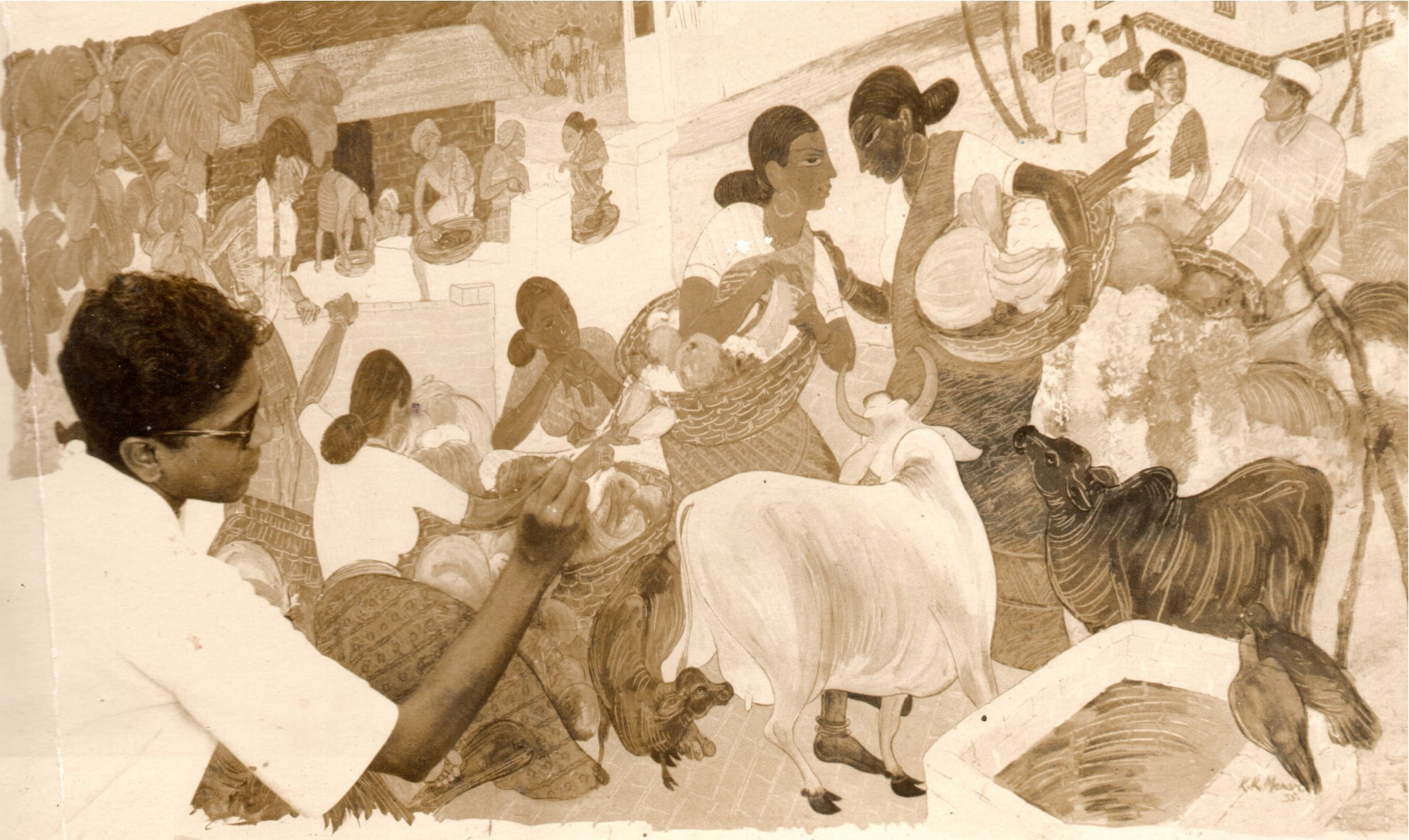
Artist K. K. Menon painting his Five-Year-Plan of India for the Sir J. J. School of Art, Bombay

While at the Sir J.J School of Art, Menon specialized in both fine arts and commercial arts simultaneously. As a result of his completion of these two five-year courses in a single five-year period of leave granted by the Indian Army, Menon was presented the “Award of Bombay Government Scholar”. This award and a fellowship supported his pursuit of a post-graduate program in Mural Decorations in 1953, where he excelled in mural art with first rank. During his time at the Sir J. J. School of Art, Menon was the recipient of multiple other awards, such as the Dean's Prize for Best Student. Menon became the first student in India to achieve the first-rank in all terminal examinations at the Sir J.J. School of Art for two consecutive years (1952-1954). In 1954, he became the youngest person to be awarded the prestigious Dolly Cursetji award, which was otherwise only awarded to post-graduate students.

Menon presented his work at numerous exhibitions, including at army exhibitions and the IVth National Exhibition of Art at the Lalit Kala Academy National Academy of Art, New Delhi in 1958. His paintings, titled “The Workers”, “Landscape” and “Untitled” were exhibited at the Bombay Area Arts and Crafts (second) Exhibition at the Jehangir Art Gallery in 1959. During his time at the Sir J. J. School of Art, Menon frequently wrote for the department of fine arts and also acted as a member of the managing committees for multiple books and magazines. His art, articles, and research appear in publications such as the Roop-Bheda, and Shilpanjali.

A letter correspondence between Menon and General Kodendera Subayya Thimayya indicates that in 1959, Menon's painting of Nawab Salabat Khan's tomb was sent to the General via the Commandant of the Armoured Corps Centre and School, Ahmednagar. General Thimayya presented the painting to be permanently installed in the 4th Battalion of the Kumaon Regiment, which was raised by Nawab Salabat Khan in the 18th century.

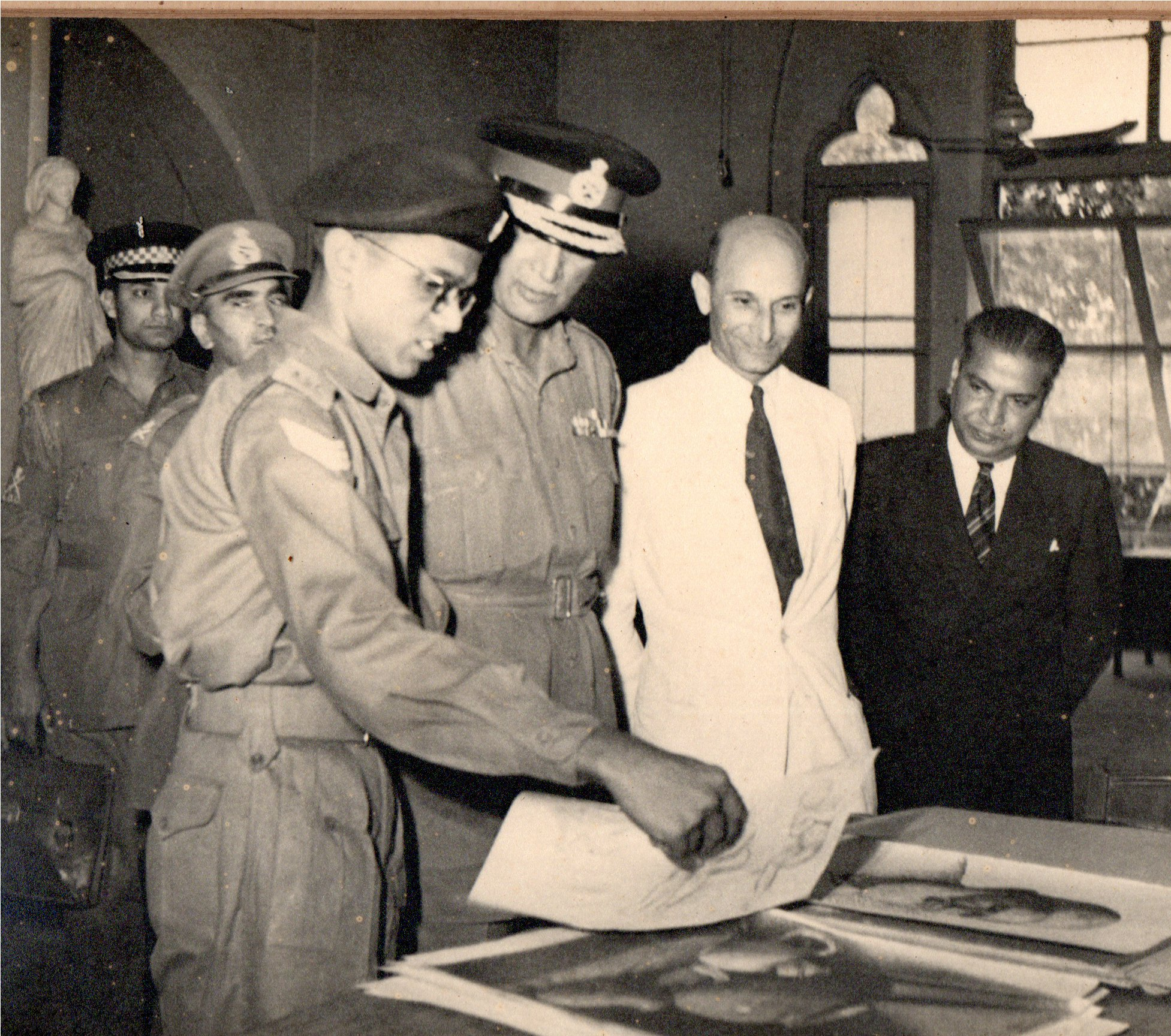
Menon shows General Cariappa and army officials his artwork at an exhibition (1951)

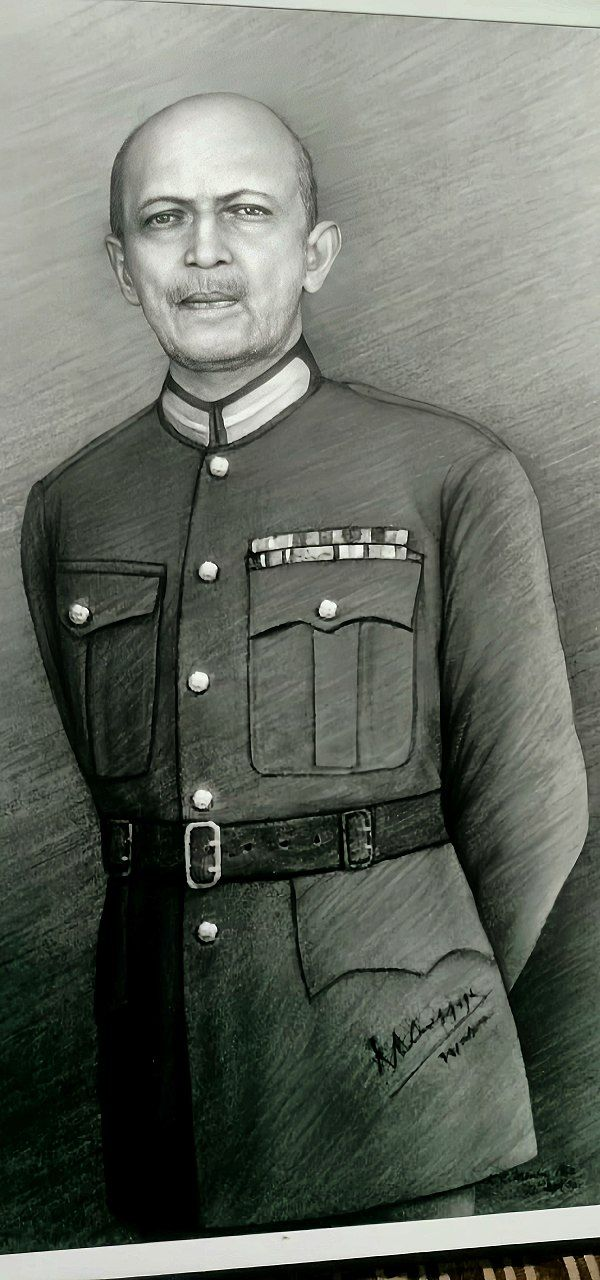
Sketch of General Cariappa that Menon drew and presented to the General (1951)

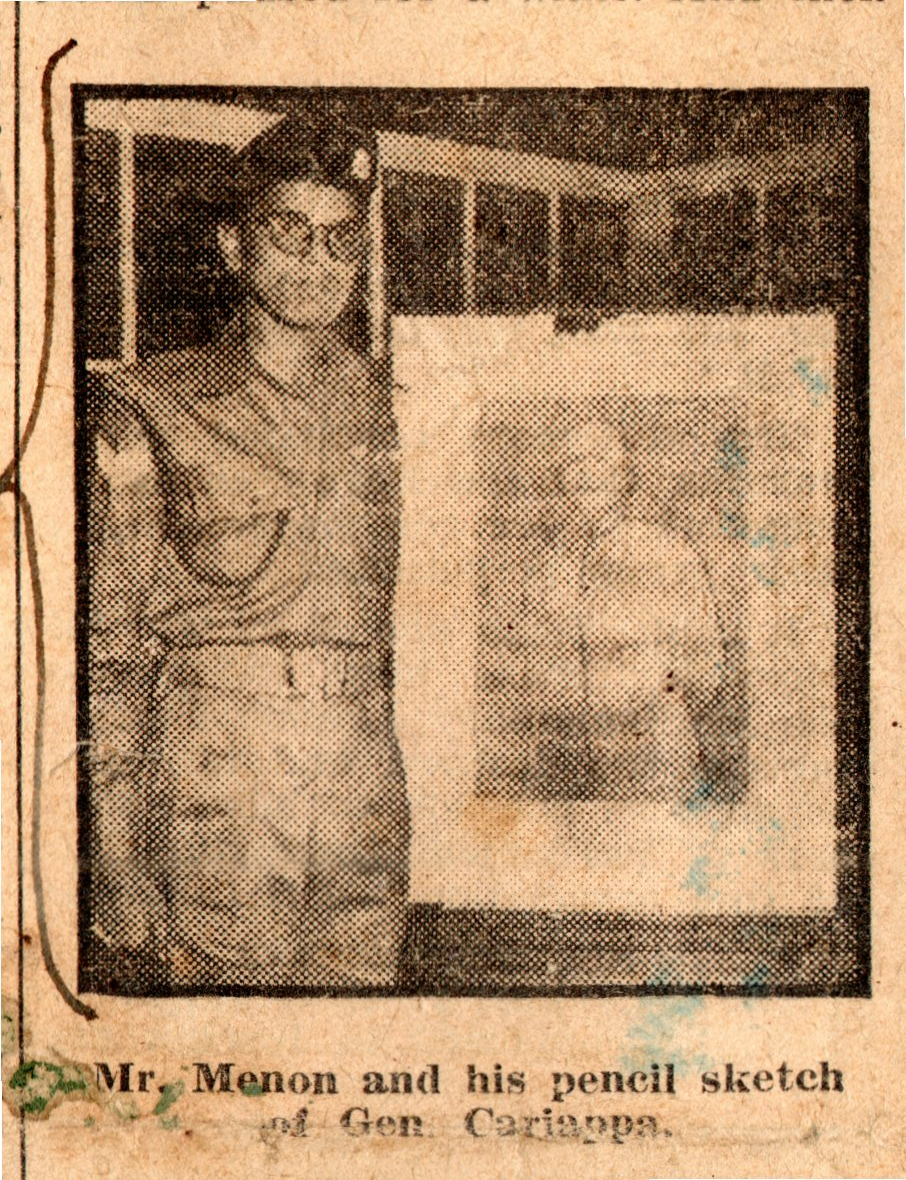
A photograph of Menon with the sketch of General Cariappa that started his career, published in The Evening News of India newspaper (October 30, 1952)

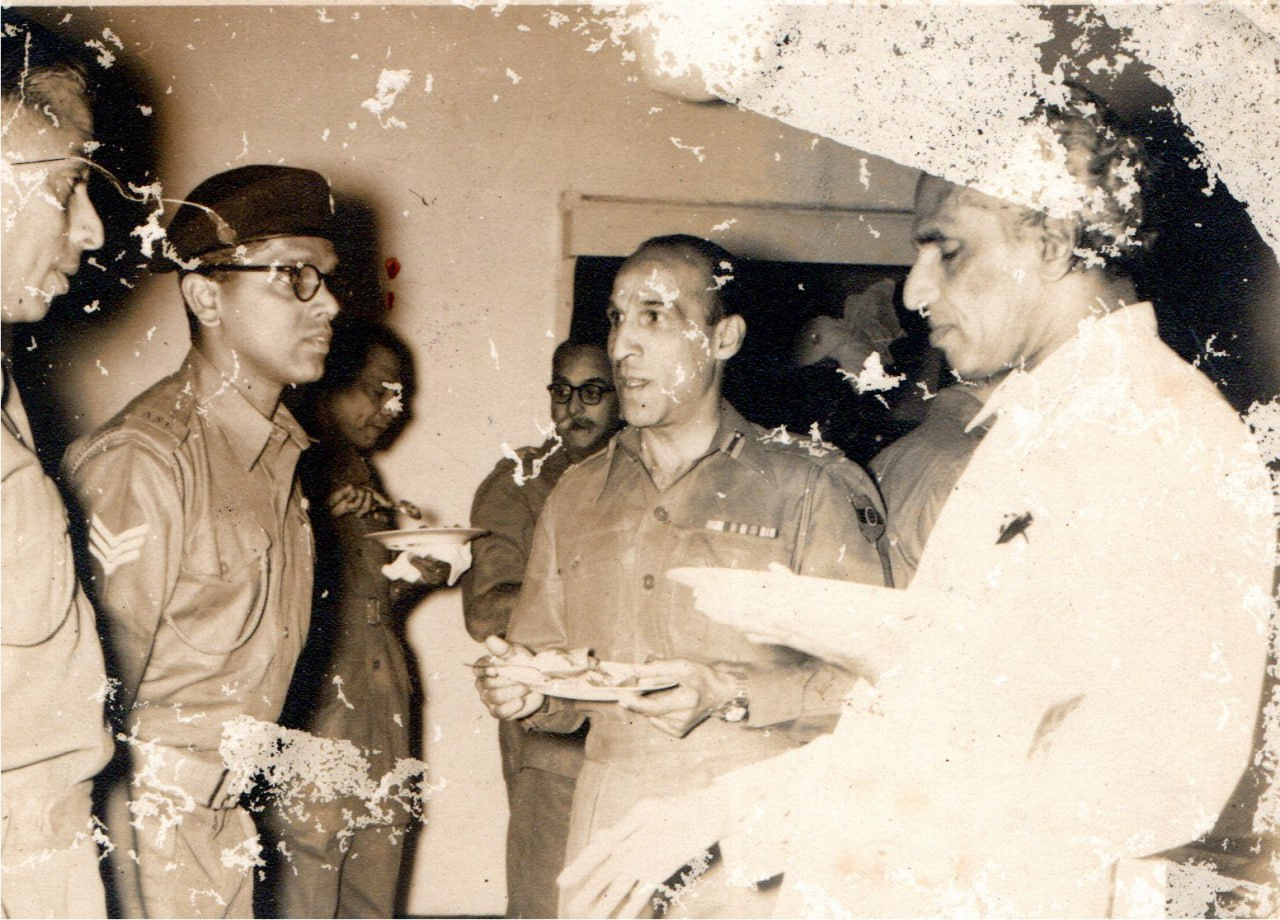
Menon talking with former Indian minister of defense V. K. Krishna Menon, who attended the exhibition to view Menon's art (1951)

=== Career as an artist and produced works ===
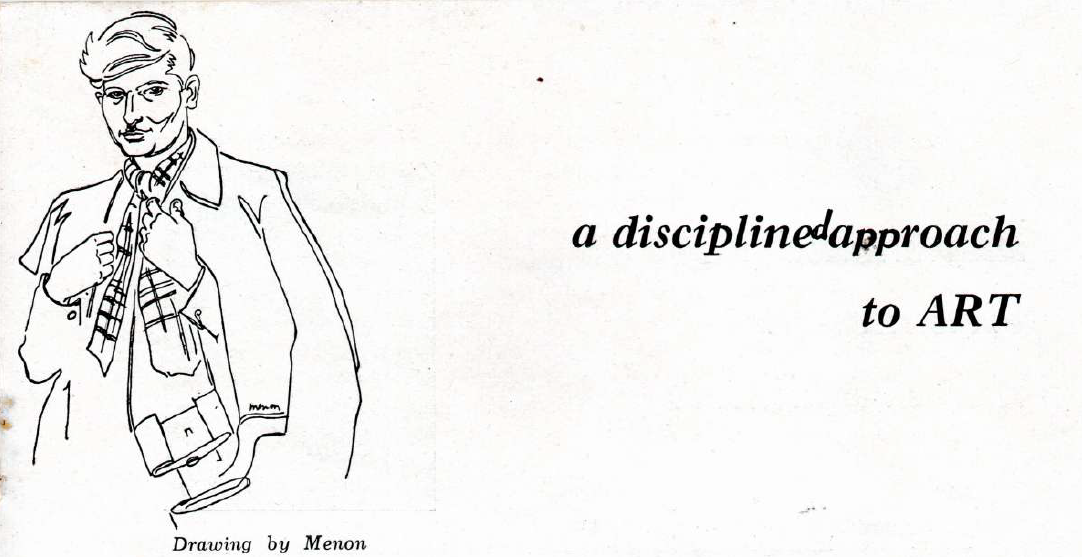
Menon's art and writing was frequently featured in magazines, such as the Roop Bheda

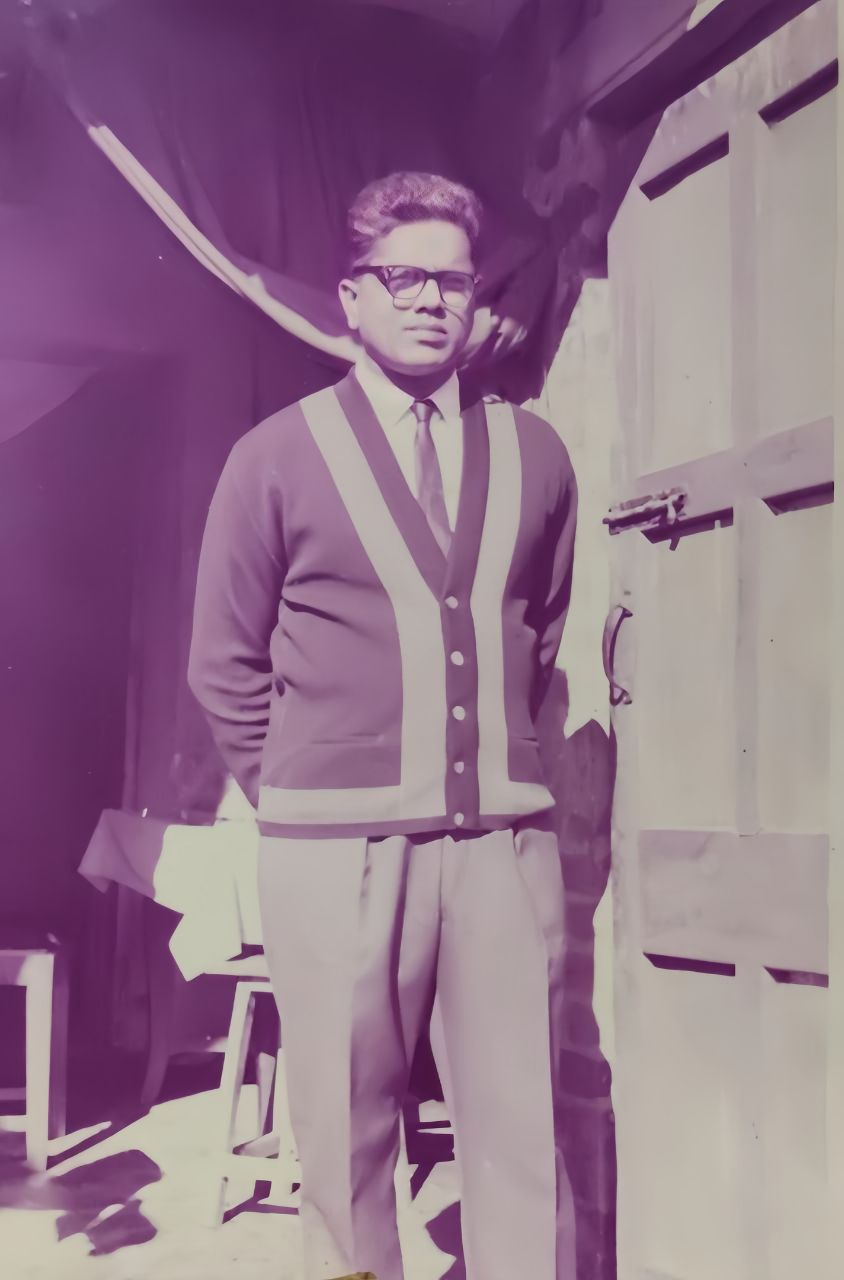
Menon in front of his art studio

Upon completing his studies in London in 1963, Menon was posted to the ASC School in Bareilly, Uttar Pradesh. He served as the Art Director of the Journal of the Army Service Corps between 1966 and 1970. Several of Menon's paintings are held by private collectors and galleries, and many were published in Indian magazines and newspapers, including Mathrubhumi, PATMA, Roop-Beeda, and Sainik Samachar. He wrote and painted frequently for the Shilpanjali magazine, the 1955 cover-edition of which featured Menon's “Five-Year-Plan for India" project done for the Sir J. J. School of Art. Menon also served as an artist to produce commissioned portraits of army officers, occasions, and army events. Some of his paintings, especially murals, are on display in Indian army offices and their various extensions throughout India. His art was also commissioned by temples.

=== Personal life ===
K.K. Menon married Vadakepat Saraswathy Amma, sister of Col. Vadakepat Narayanakutty Nair (VNK Nair) AVSM, in 1956. They had two children. Saraswathy Amma was a teacher in Thrissur, Kerala. She later joined Menon in Bombay and England. While in Kerala, Menon lived in the Thozupadam Vadakepat tharavad with his family. He died on October 14, 1999.

== Works ==
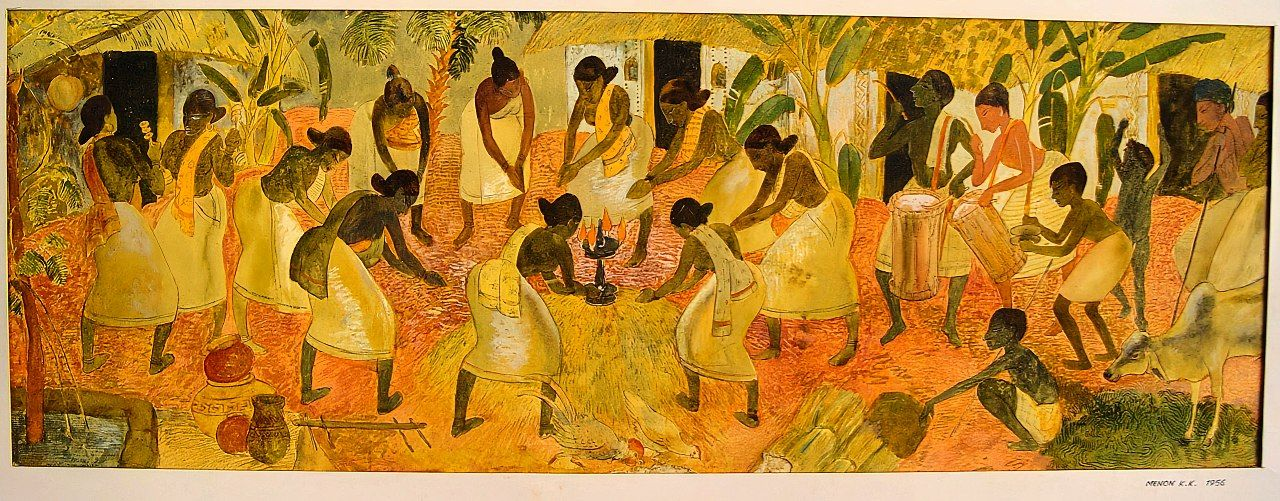
Thiruvathirakali, 1956. Watercolour. Menon enjoyed painting festivities. This painting depicts the thiruvathirakali performance of Kerala.

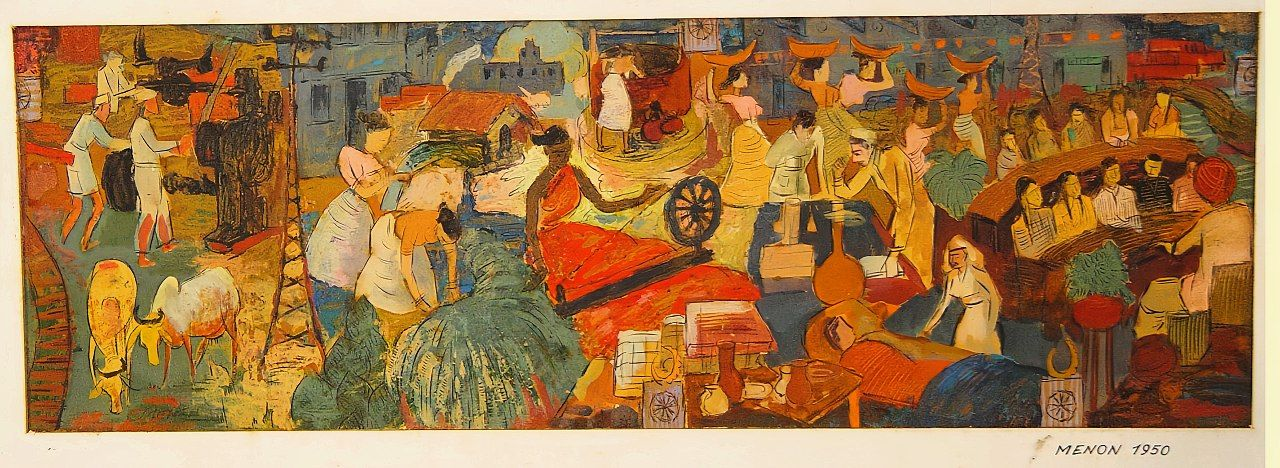
Indian Rurality, 1950. Oil on canvas.

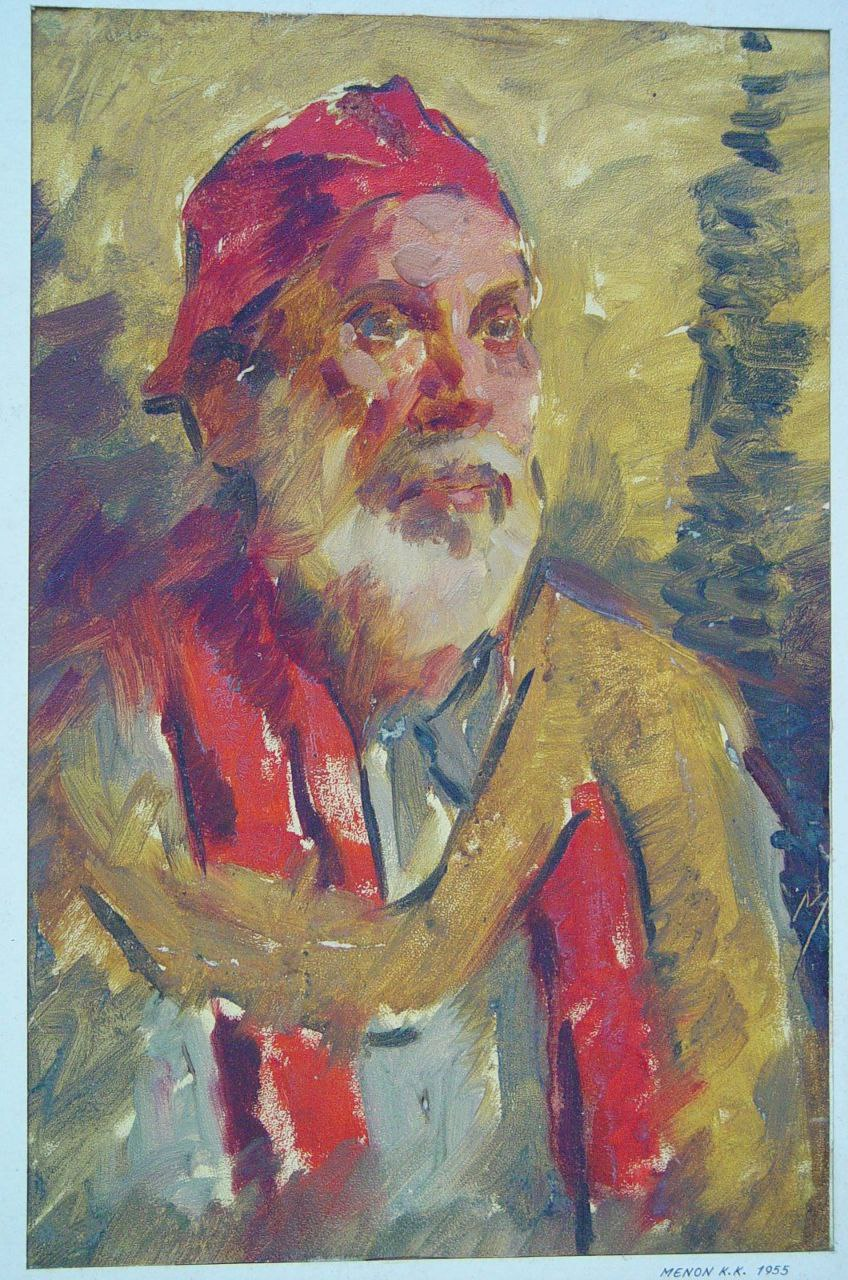
Portrait (ഒരു സാധന), 1955. Oil on canvas.

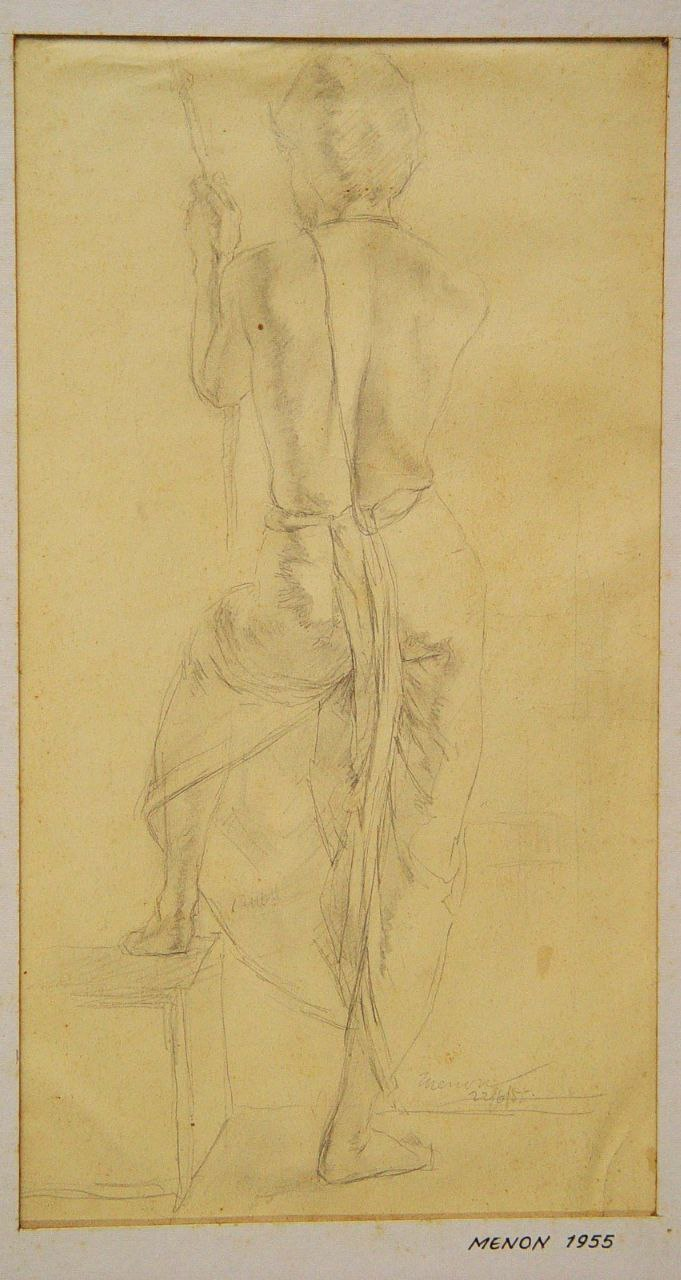
Portrait of a lady, 1955. Pencil on paper.

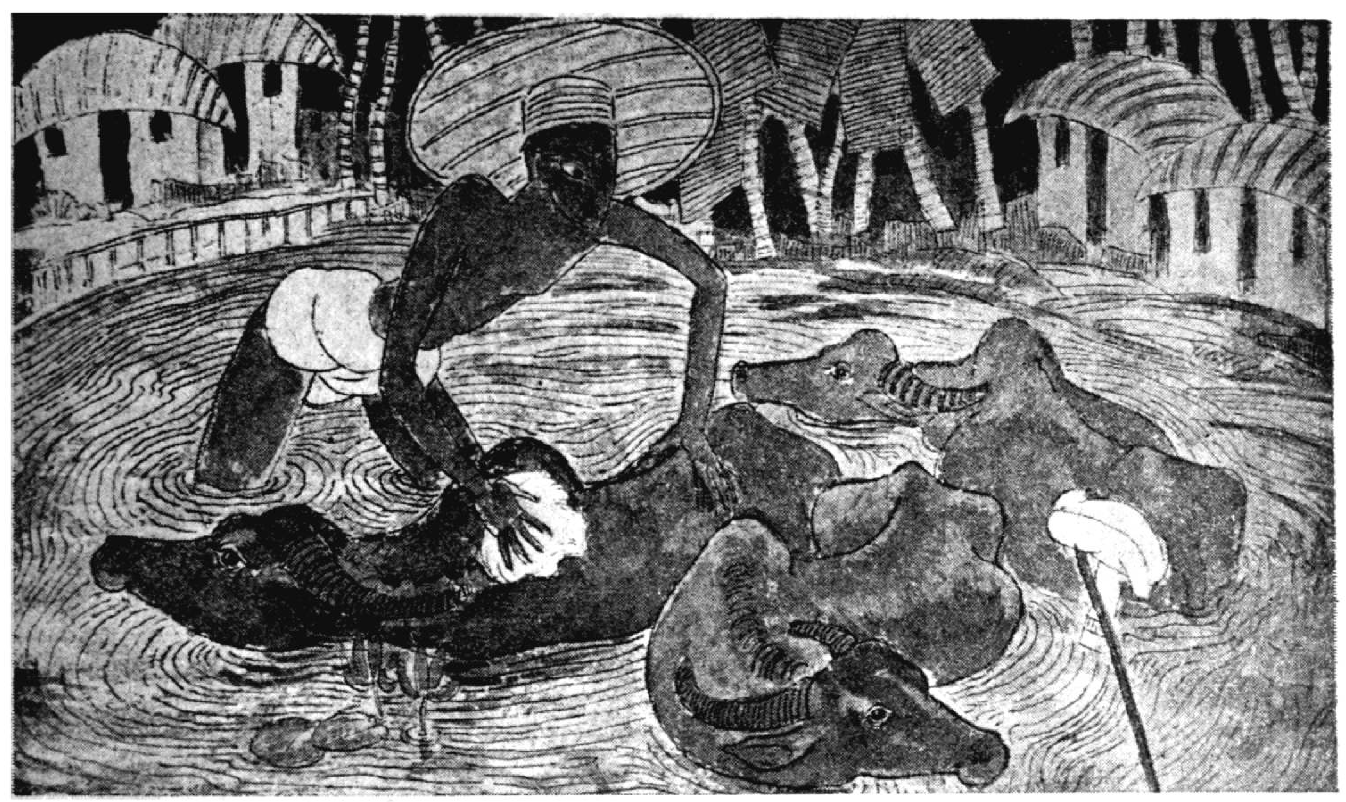
Bathing a Buffalo (എരുമയെ കുളിപ്പിക്കൽ), date unknown. Watercolour.

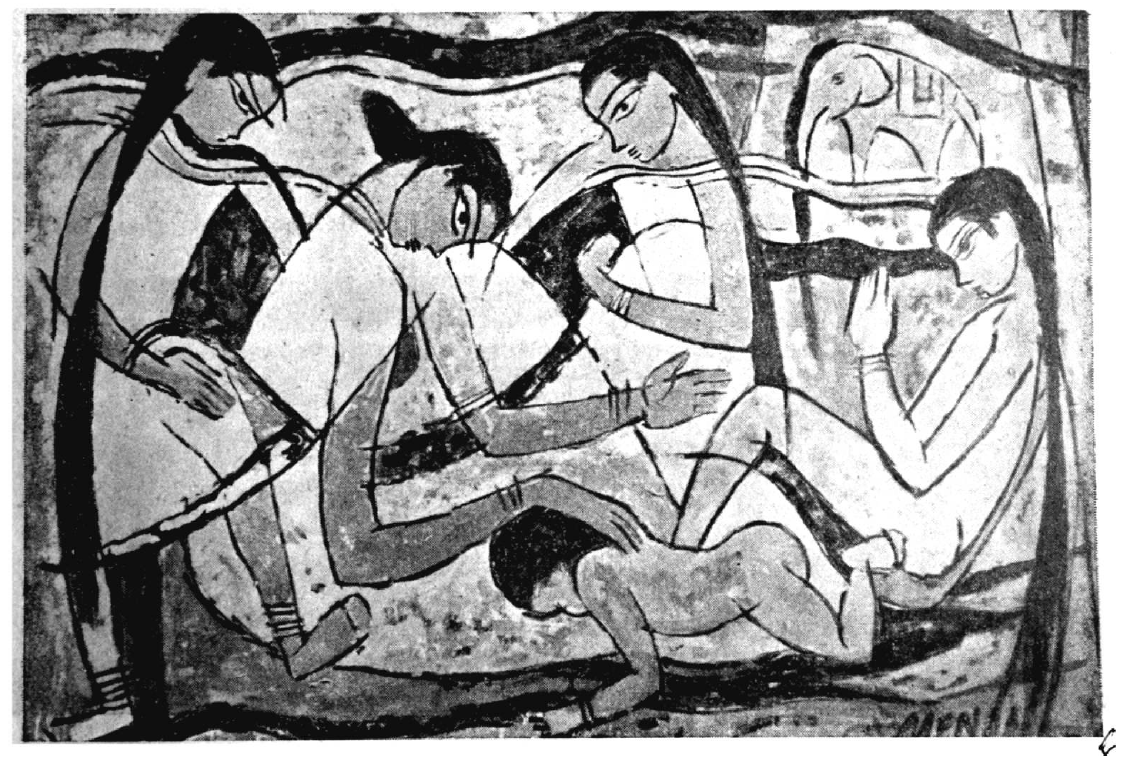
Life's Struggle (ജീവിത സമരം), date unknown. Oil on canvas.

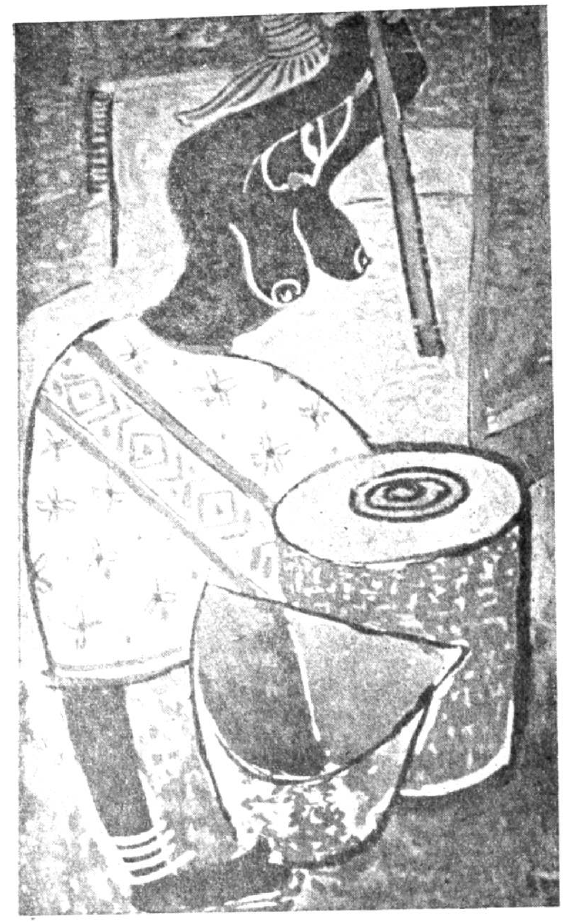
Effort (പ്രയത്‌നം), date unknown. Watercolour.

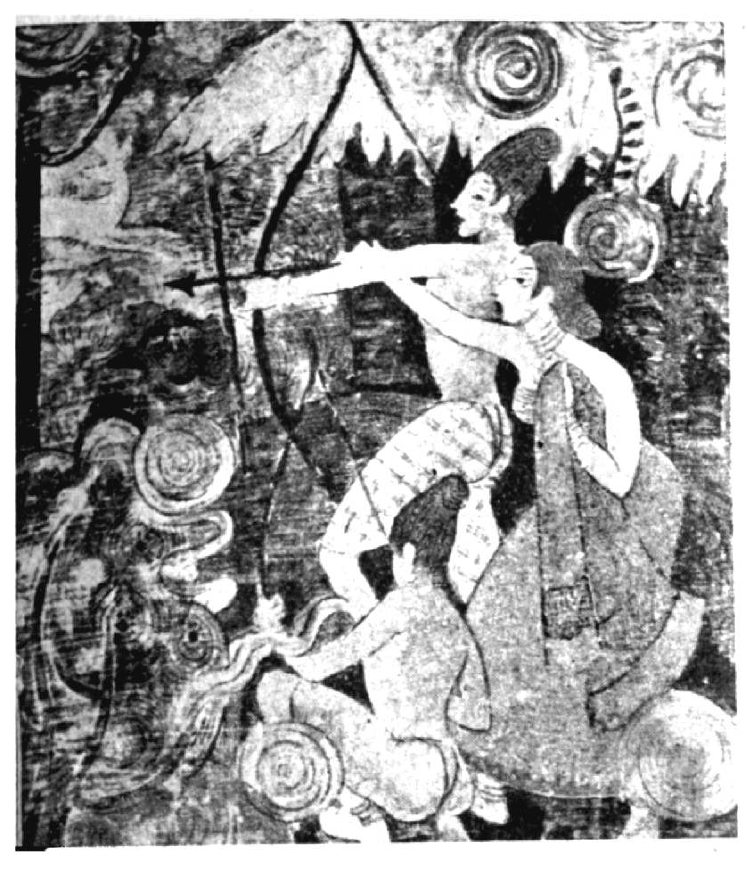
Death of Maricha (മാരീചന്റെ മരണം), date unknown. Watercolour.
