= A. A. Raiba =

Indian painter (1922–2016)

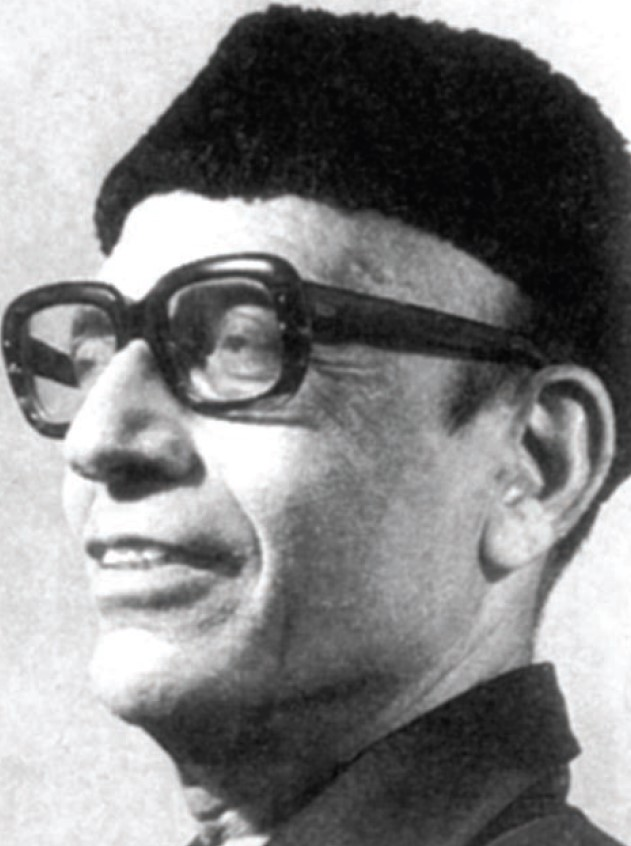
- Born: Abdul Aziz Raiba; 20 July 1922; Bombay, British India
- Died: 15 April 2016 (aged 93)
- Education: Sir J. J. School of Art, Mumbai
- Notable work: The Roti Seller; Old Bombay

Abdul Aziz "A. A." Raiba (20 July 1922 – 15 April 2016) was an Indian painter. Educated at the Sir J. J. School of Art in Bombay (1942–46), Raiba started painting professionally in the early 1950s. He won several medals from the Bombay Art Society: Bronze and silver medals, 1947–51; and the gold medal in 1956. His paintings are in collections in the Cairo Museum, Egypt, in the Nagpur Museum and in the National Gallery of Modern Art in Delhi. His work has been shown in over 20 exhibitions. He painted several large murals for clients such as Air India and Ashok Hotel.

His work is characterised by bold shapes, strong outlines and simple use of sophisticated color. His landscapes often use a deliberately naive perspective.

== Early life ==
Temkar Street, off Kamathipura, in Bombay Central, is a street that is inhabited predominantly by Konkani Muslims, coming from the coastal regions of Maharashtra, who speak a dialect of Marathi. Their family names are similar to those of their Hindu neighbours. Abdul Aziz Raiba, was born into one such family on this street in 1922. His father was a tailor and he came from a family of meagre means. Education from an early age for him was dependent on the availability of scholarships. He began his education at a Gujarati medium school, though Marathi was his first language. Later he secured a scholarship to study at the progressive and prestigious Anjuman-I-Islam school. Here he excelled in Urdu, and was asked by his teachers to become a writer. Raiba began writing couplets and soon took to translating the works of Allama Iqbal to English. He learnt Arabic calligraphy, and a Hindu teacher seeing this ability, realised he could draw well. Asking Raiba what he was doing, Raiba was unable to answer, not knowing what it was called. The teacher told him that he had a talent of great use, and introduced him to the artist Dandavatimath. Dandavatimath, along with artist Rao and Prof Badigar, had established a school called Nutan Kala Mandir, or the Modern Art Temple, at the Blavatsky Lodge of the Theosophical Society at French Bridge, Opera House in Bombay.

== Schooling ==
Raiba studied at the school for a foundation course, learning basic techniques essential for admission to the Sir JJ School of Art. The school's location at the Theosophical Society, had an interchange of dialogue between Art and the principles of Theosophy. Theosophy advocates seeking enlightenment through the search of truth, essential and common to all religions to solve unanswered questions of mankind. It requires faith in a common brotherhood and respect for men of all creeds and races. Echoing this, Raiba many years later in his invitation-catalogue for an exhibition of his works in 1984 said, "To comprehend the meaning of Art, I have ceaselessly tried to understand what life is – its circuitous course and ultimate goal. I go through a labyrinth of desire and fear, and I must keep on. The only alternative to ceaseless action is Death, which alone can drop a curtain on the medley of deeds and also what remains undone".

Raiba was introduced to Charles Gerard, then dean of Sir JJ School of Art, who urged him to pursue mural painting and work with oils. Raiba greatly admired the works of his professor J. M. Ahivasi, who belonged to the revivalist school of Indian miniature painting. Raiba, though, believed that the technique of oil painting presented many more possibilities than the use of tempera. He however retained certain elements of visual play from his early training in the Indian traditions. Seeking to establish a distinct style, Raiba rejected western norms of landscape painting. In his works the use of light is akin to that of miniature paintings. He blurred out the horizon and instead illuminated intended subjects, giving them a three-dimensional sculpted quality. Therefore, like miniature paintings various perspectives lie in the same plane. In his portraits of village folk, he placed the woman in the same plane as the hamlet which surround her, but rendered in a perspective where she diminishes the other details such as the hamlet. Some of Raiba's later works illustrated the poems of Mirza Ghalib.

== Early work ==
Raiba studied at the Sir JJ School of Art, from 1942 to 1946. After graduating with a diploma, Charles Gerard appointed him as a fellow to assist other students. Though there were protestations to his appointment, as he lacked fluency in spoken English, Gerard asked him to continue. Later that year he was contemplating moving to Paris, like most of his contemporaries. Raiba approached Walter Laghammer, the Austrian art director of the Times of India, for advice. Langhammer knowing his meagre means advised him instead to go live in Kashmir. Raiba took up residence in the Naginbagh area of Srinagar and often travelled to the city's various Mughal gardens such as the Nishatbagh to sketch. He would then travel on foot into the mountains, surviving on milk given to him by the nomadic pastoral tribe – the Gurjars. An earlier unfinished work from Kashmir, that depicts the change in seasons, illustrates time, and probably has its references from the time he spent dwelling with the Gurjars. Apart from landscapes, his works from this period capture the pointed slanting wooden roofs of the Mosques in winter, or portraits of Kashmiri women rendered similarly, white sharp fine and pointed lines. Having lived in Kashmir for a duration of five years, after a romance gone sour, Raiba returned to Bombay.

Upon his return, he married his cousin. His father was opposed to the marriage, as he believed his son lacked character by choosing to be an artist. He soon began to search for a job to sustain himself. During this time he chanced upon MF Hussain, who introduced him to the legendary film maker K. Asif, who employed him as an Art Director in his film studio. The glamour and trappings of Cinema did not suit Raiba and he soon quit. Hussain then found him a job at the furniture store Roop Bharati, at Lamignton road run by a Gujarati lady called Sushilaben. Here he designed furniture along with artists Ara and Hussain during which the Progressive Artist Group invited him to join their collective, to which he declined as he found the functioning of the group least progressive. He sustained himself on commissions of murals, winning notable projects such as those for Air India and the Ashoka Hotel in New Delhi.

Raiba lived in a 100 square feet tenement with his mother, his wife and three children. This space served too as the studio. Canvas in those was not easy to come by and was usually imported. During his time in Kashmir stretched cloth on a board served as his canvas. Jute when stretched tight is extremely taught, but the fibres from the strains of jute often shed. Being from a plant that grows in standing water, with humid conditions, the fibre resists decay by humidity and is apt for tropical temperatures. It is readily available and cheap. Using jute for its availability and cost, Raiba soon devised a method of priming the stretched jute, using techniques learnt during his training to be a muralist at school. He would prepare the surface of his jute canvas by creating a white sticky solution of white clay paste, fevicol (gum adhesive), water and ground bricks. The gum adhesive would act as the binder and bring in the colour. The prepared canvas had a taught smooth surface that was dull white in colour. The process is time-consuming as the jute strings absorb the solution easily but the pores between them take time to fill. It takes 15 layers of application before the stretched jute can be used as a canvas. Raiba, is distinct in his use of jute, he changes the surface of the material to resemble a canvas and does not use it in its natural form. While painting there is a deep absorption of the paint into the surface, leaving a rough texture on the surface, altering the shades of the paint. Even after years of having been painted these canvases do not develop cracks or have any fungal damage in comparison to the common canvas. The placement of subjects within his paintings borrow from the murals, narrating multiple stories, histories through intricate images that often go unnoticed but remain essential.

Having a deep interest in Islamic literature and Urdu Poetry, Raiba was a scholar at heart. His works were not merely beautiful landscapes that emerged from live drawings. They were imaginary, based on a studied research of History. Though Raiba often travelled to places he would then treat as subjects for his canvas. Right after Kashmir, Raiba travelled to the temples of South India, disguising himself as a Kashmiri Pandit as entry into temples for Muslims was prohibited. Having never had the means to travel outside India, he constantly travelled the sub-continent in search of a subject with Goa being the most recent. A large oveure of his work is based on recreated scenes of old Bombay and the erstwhile Portuguese colonies that neighboured the city such as Bassein (Vasai). Raiba along with just a few other modernists was a native of Bombay. His family were from the Konkan – coastal Maharashtra, part of which was once ruled by the Portuguese. His community – the Konkani Muslims were ancient seafarers who held a distinct but integrated identity along with the Jews and Christians in a predominantly Hindu Konkan. Raiba always celebrated the fact that his surname had a Hindu origin and his mother was of Hindu lineage. In years before 1980, Raiba began research for the most important exhibition he claims to have executed. At the Petit Library in Bombay, he referenced illustrative manuscripts of the British and the Portuguese from the 18th century that depicted old etchings and maps of Bombay, he searched for details from the Gazette of India, a compilation of minute details by the British of their possessions, and personal travelogues and biographies of those who had passed through the city. This served as an archive of information based on which he recreated an imagined nostalgia of the city from the 18th century for an exhibition of paintings at Jehangir Art Gallery, perhaps as an ode to his origins. Soon after, Raiba's studio on Temkar street was lost as the building collapsed due to disrepair, and the family had to move to the distant suburbs, ironically in the environs of Vasai (Bassein)

== Style ==
Always using Charcoal to sketch, Raiba's use of the line was subject specific, changing over the years, dependent on what he chose to study and illustrate. In his earlier works, he depicts Christ, female nudes, and the erotic with sharp linear, angular shapes, falling short of being defined as cubist. In his landscapes and portraits of rural folk, a much later series, Raiba's lines began to curve vivaciously finding echoes with the styles of the Mexican Muralists. Perhaps his concurrent training at the JJ in techniques of both the Western and the Indian schools of painting at the eve of Indian Independence compounded by a scholarly reclusive nature gave birth to a style and technique that bore few distinguishable similarities with the works of other artists.

The invites to his exhibitions were self designed, experimenting often with font, paper textures and improvising the design of the catalogue into shapes that were innovative in their fold. Raiba, had a lifelong experimentation with Calligraphy which he often took to with passion, conjuring bird shapes out of Urdu couplets. His experimentation with technique and medium was a continuous process. In 1980, Raiba, while visiting the JJ School of Architecture for the admission of his elder son, encountered hobby classes at the school's fine art faculty. He enrolled himself into the printmaking department then headed by YC Shukla and Vasant Parab for evening classes in printmaking. Here he learnt how to prepare the plate, draw onto it and print etchings. After creating a few plates, he was soon bored of the medium and instead began to carve out flat shapes of animals and designs to create three-dimensional works, from the copper plates given to him. His tryst with printmaking ended after he lost interest in the medium and due to the prohibitive cost of plates, which at the time were imported. Having recently concluded his show 'Old Bombay', often visiting coastal Koliwadas (fishing villages) to observe the old Portuguese Forts and embankments, Raiba etched three mullets together playing with the possibilities, to capture the graphic quality of their scales. His recent experimentations though have been with glass, composing a singular image three-dimensionally by placing differently drawn layers of glass together.

When AA Raiba was 86, reflecting back on his practice he said, that decades have passed but his work remained unfinished. " Itni Umar gayi, Kam khatam nahi hua"(In Urdu – " So many years have passed, I am old, yet my practice remains unfinished.") – AA Raiba

== Awards ==
1947 Silver Medal, Bombay Art Society, Bombay. 1947 Bronze Medal, Bombay Art Society, Bombay. 1947 Awarded The Late Rao Bahadur S.V. Rajadhyaksha Memorial Prize, Bombay Art Society, Bombay. 1951 Silver Medal, Bombay Art Society, Bombay. 1952 Awarded Sheth Vullabhdas Cursondas Nath's Prize, Bombay Art Society, Bombay. 1953 Highly Commended, Annual Exhb., Bombay Art Society, Bombay. 1953 Awarded The Late Shri Kavasji Jalbhoy Stt Memorial, Bombay Art Society, Bombay. 1954 Awarded The Bombay Fine Art Offset and Litho Works Prize, Bombay Art Society, Bombay. 1956 Gold Medal, Bombay Art Society, Bombay. 1962 Awarded as one among the ten best exhibits of the year, Lalit Kala Akademi, New Delhi.

== Exhibition history ==
1953 Bombay Artist Creations, Zurich. 1954 Biennale of Rome. 1955 Solo exhb., AIFACS, New Delhi. 1956 Solo exhb., Graham Studio, Bombay. 1957 Exhb. of Indian Contemporary paintings, Milan. 1959 Solo exhb., Jehangir Art Gallery, Bombay. 1961 Exhb. at UAE. 1961 Exhb. at USSR, Paris and Rio de Janeiro. 1964 Solo exhb., Taj Art Gallery, Bombay. 1965 Exhb. at South East Africa and Nairobi. 1967 Solo exhb. on Bara-Masa, Shirom Art Gallery, Bombay. 1967 Solo exhb. on catastrophe, Taj Art Gallery, Bombay. 1968 Solo exhb., Attic Art Gallery, Bombay. 1969 Mirza Ghalib Centenary Show, Taj Art Gallery, Bombay. 1969 Solo exhb., Taj Art Gallery, Bombay. 1970 10 Hrs to 20 Hrs, Taj Art Gallery, Bombay. Solo exhb., Gallery Oasis, Bombay. 1972 Solo exhb. on kaleidoscopic paintings, Taj Art Gallery, Bombay. 1973 Solo exhb. of Neo Miniature Paintings, Taj Art Gallery, Bombay. 1975 Bombay of the 18th Century, Taj Art Gallery and Gallery Chemould, Bombay. His paintings are worth upwards of three lakh rupees.

A Solo Exhibition of the artist AA Raiba after twelve years, curated by the Clark House Initiative for Gallery Art & Soul.

AA Raiba had hung three large unfinished works from his Kashmir Series of the 1950s on the walls of his studio. These unfinished panoramas of Kashmir's wintry landscapes, towns and temples, include a large primed canvas of coarse coatings on jute whose embedded designs and relief, reveal a plethora of stages to fathom from the artist's process and technique. Strong and weathered, the paintings have come out of his studio after sixty years. They will dramatically take up the space of the present exhibition, calling attention to the materials he used: jute or old sarees, treated with invented mixtures, that primed, sized, gave texture, and unfading colour to his paintings. A box of school notebooks form a part his studio. Raiba had pasted into school exercise books hundreds of his drawings, jottings and cuttings, folds of papers which open up to larger grids of space, from which he drew his world of references. He has labelled them according to his obsessions. A slideshow archiving every drawing in these sketchbooks runs on a small screen beside the old books that are too fragile to be handled. Also from his studio, are printmaking copper-plates, which he had once cut up into calligraphic stencils, to make a three-dimensional sculptural work. He made many of his own pigments, a bright lemon-peel yellow from mango leaves fed to cows, as the ancient Indian miniaturists had done for many centuries. These impoverished materials of his art, have valor.

His experiments with material may have to do with growing up in his father's small tailor's shop in Temkar Street in Bombay, with small strips of waste cloth lying heaped on the floor of the shop, amidst which he was allowed to play. A polyglot, Raiba, learned Urdu as a child at school, soon composing couplets, and then translating the poetry of Allama Iqbal into English. He graduated from Sir JJ School of art in 1946, and was active alongside the Progressive Artists Group, especially friendly with Hussain and Ara, working at jobs they found between them – at the storied furniture shop and cinema studios that are a part of the art history of this period. He left for Kashmir on the suggestion of Walter Langhammer, the Times of India art director, returning to Bombay after five years.

Raiba has resisted exhibiting for a long time, uncertain of the presentation of his work. Exhibitions for him developed out of long periods of research – the making of his solo exhibitions was scholarly, writing exquisite, clear and wit-edged prose, to fit within his self-designed catalogues and invitations. With age, he felt he had lost the ability to orchestrate a similar show. Therefore, intrigued by a proposal to recreate his studio, and studio practices, and to have an involved dialogue with the works from the perspective of their making, he agreed to present his work again to an audience.
