= Phursumba Sherpa =

Indian mountaineer (1944–2025)

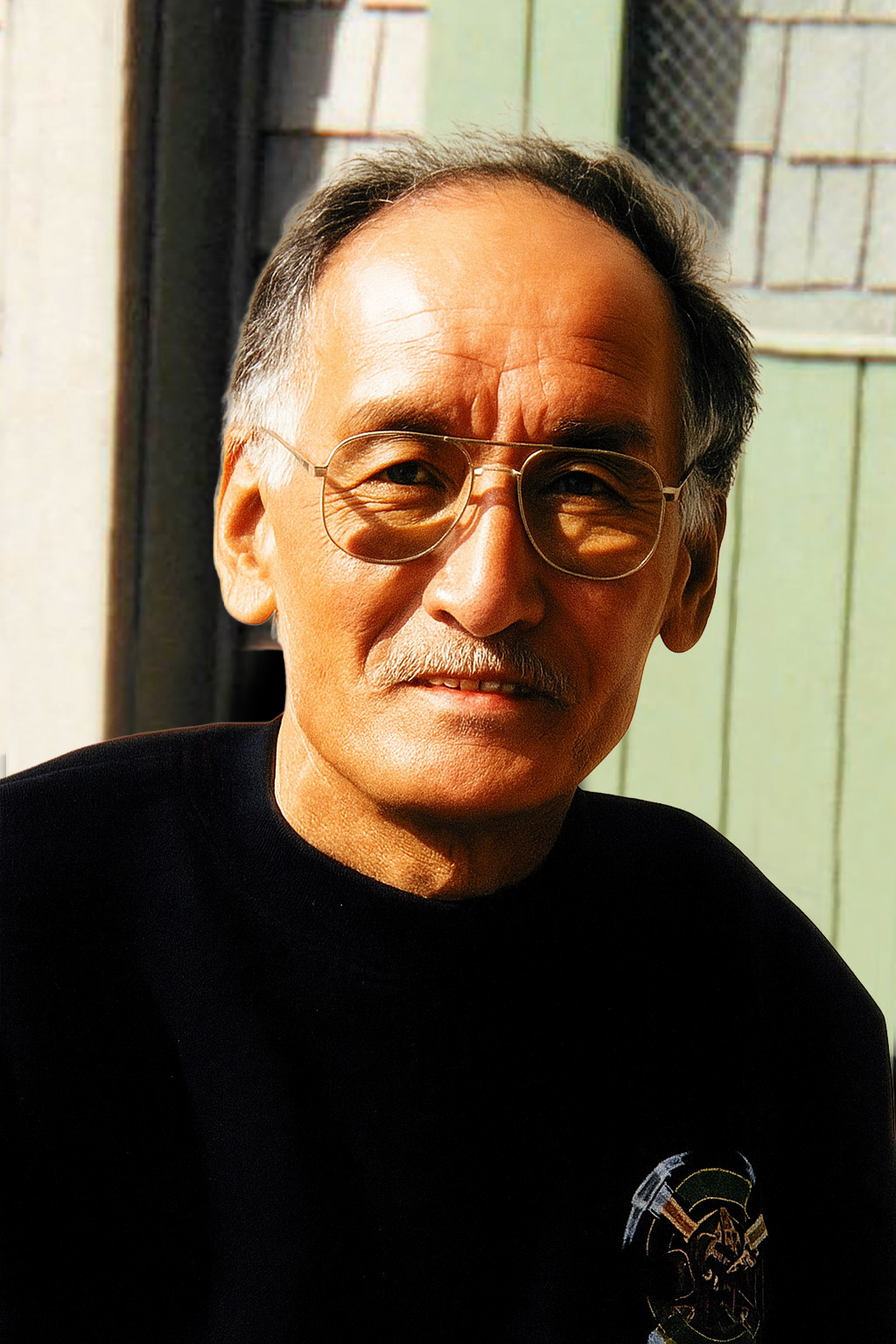
- Born: Phursumba; 14 February 1944; Darjeeling, West Bengal, India
- Died: 20 October 2025 (aged 81); Seattle, Washington, USA
- Citizenship: India and United States
- Occupation: Mountaineer
- Relatives: Nawang Gombu Sherpa (brother-in-law)

Phursumba Sherpa (February 14, 1944 – October 20, 2025) was an Indian mountaineer, instructor, Arctic explorer, and Alpine Guide. His career included work in the Himalayas, the Arctic Circle, and the Pacific Northwest of the United States. He was one of the early instructors at the Himalayan Mountaineering Institute (HMI) in Darjeeling and later became one of the first Sherpa climbing guides in North America with RMI Expeditions, also known as Rainier Mountaineering, Inc (RMI). His work bridged Himalayan climbing traditions with Western alpine climbing and outdoor education.

== Early life and background ==
Phursumba Sherpa was born in 1944 in Darjeeling, West Bengal, India, located in the eastern Himalayas. After the death of his parents at a young age, he was raised by his sister Sita and her husband, Nawang Gombu Sherpa, a pioneering mountaineer and nephew of Tenzing Norgay. Gombu became the first person to summit Mount Everest twice. Growing up in a family closely involved in Himalayan expeditions, Phursumba developed mountaineering skills early in life.

== Mountaineering Career ==
1960 Indian Everest Expedition (Sherpa)

At age sixteen, Phursumba took part in the first Indian attempt to climb Mount Everest in 1960, led by Brigadier Gyan Singh. Phursumba Sherpa served as a high-altitude Sherpa, where he was assigned to Keki Bunshah, a Bombay-based lawyer who served as the expedition’s deputy leader. Phursumba assisted in establishing high camps above the Khumbu Icefall as the team advanced toward the upper mountain. Bunshah ultimately reached Camp IV during the attempt.

1965 Indian Everest Expedition (Sherpa)

By his early twenties, Phursumba was serving as a high-altitude Sherpa for the 1965 Indian Everest Expedition, India’s first successful ascent of Mount Everest. He supported climbers by establishing high camps and ferrying loads to approximately 27,000 feet. The mission became a milestone in India’s climbing history and helped solidify his role among Himalayan mountaineers.

1967 Indian Summit of Chaukhamba I (Sherpa "Sirdar")

On June 15^{th}, 1967, Phursumba summited Chowkhamba I (23,420 feet) with R.S. Cheema and Ang Kami. It was the first time in the history of the National Defense Academy that an expedition was sent to the Himalayas. Phursumba was the lead Sherpa guide or “Sirdar” on this Himalayan expedition. He was instrumental in the planning and execution of this climb as detailed in Indian Armed Forces journal Sainik Samachar, 1969 (Volume 16, Issues 1-26).

- “In the evening we held consultation with Ang Kami Sherpa and Phursumba and decided to send three assault parties of five members each”
- “Phursumba cut hand and foot holds for everybody's convenience”
- "The weather became bad and it started snowing; visibility was reduced to a few feet and time being of the essence. Ang Kami and Phursumba could help one of us, and it happened to be Cadet Cheema”
- “Reaching the top of the wall I saw Phursumba taking a snap of Avtar Singh Cheema and Ang Kami Sherpa standing on the summit and holding the flags in their hands”.
- “The peak was scaled by Ang Kami, Phursumba and Cadet R.S. Cheema exactly at 1430 hours”.

Himalayan Mountaineering Institute (Instructor}

After the 1965 expedition, he became one of the early instructors at the Himalayan Mountaineering Institute under the direction of Tenzing Norgay. The instructional team included Da Namgyal, Gyalzen, Wangdi, Ang Temba, and other Sherpa climbers who represented the first generation of Sherpa instructors in modern Himalayan mountaineering.

Trans-Arctic Expedition (Professional Mountaineer and Survival Expert)

In 1967, Phursumba Sherpa joined Australian adventurer David Humphreys on an attempted Trans-Arctic expedition aimed at reaching the North Pole from Ward Hunt Island while conducting geophysical and bathymetric surveys of the mid-Arctic Ridge. The five-man party of Australian navigator David Humphreys (team leader), Phursumba Sherpa of Darjeeling (mountain climber and survival expert ), Leif Lundgaard (Norwegian polar veteran), Dick Mickelson (photographer), and Ken Poste (Canadian cameraman and Arctic film specialist) traveled by ski with two light sledges and pack dogs. After reaching Resolute Bay in December 1967, the team encountered logistical setbacks and delays; they ultimately advanced as far as Kap Morris Jessup in northern Greenland before abandoning the attempt in May 1968. Phursumba was noted in contemporary media reports for his role in the attempt.

Although the 1967–68 Trans-Arctic Expedition did not reach the North Pole, it achieved a significant geographic discovery. Through celestial navigation and modern surveying instruments, the team identified major errors in existing maps of Greenland’s northernmost coastline. Their findings revealed inaccuracies exceeding 3,000 square miles, prompting revisions to all official maps of the region and effectively extending Greenland’s documented territory.

The 1967 Trans-Arctic Expedition was later documented in the film Arctic Odyssey: The David Humphreys Polar Expedition, which follows the team’s attempt to reach the North Pole. The documentary was produced by filmmaker Stuart Schulberg.

Rainier Mountaineering, Inc (Guide)

Following the Arctic expedition, Phursumba immigrated to the United States in 1969 to work with Rainier Mountaineering, Inc. (RMI), founded by Lou Whittaker, brother of Jim Whittaker, the first American to summit Mount Everest. At Mount Rainier, Phursumba served as a climbing guide and instructor, introducing technical Himalayan climbing methods to American alpinists. He was later joined by his brother-in-law, Nawang Gombu, who also guided for RMI during the 1970s, 80s and 90s.

== Public Demonstrations and Appearances ==
In 1969, at the Seattle Sport, Recreation, and Travel Show, Phursumba Sherpa demonstrated technical climbing skills on an imitation cliff made from plywood and timbers constructed for the event. He ascended the structure using ropes and carabiners placed in strategic points before performing a display of advanced climbing techniques. His exhibition concluded with a dramatic face-forward descent down the “cliff,” a stunt noted in local coverage as spectacular.

In 1970, Phursumba appeared at the Portland Boat, Trailer and Sport Show, where he demonstrated rock scaling and mountaineering techniques on a 35-foot rock replica of a mountain rock face. Newspapers at the time described him as the only Sherpa then residing in the United States and noted his outreach in educating the public about Himalayan climbing culture.

== Later Life and Legacy ==
On 8 June 1973, Phursumba was reunited in Allentown, Pennsylvania, with his sister Sita and his brother-in-law Nawang Gombu, as well as the mountaineering legend Tenzing Norgay. Sita and Phursumba had been separated for six years prior to this meeting.

He returned to his hometown of Darjeeling in 1993 for a short stay, his first time back after 26 years away.

In later decades, Phursumba continued to guide climbs and treks in both the United States and India. In 2001, he led American trekking expeditions to Goecha La Pass in Sikkim after the region was opened to foreign visitors.

He maintained close ties with the Sherpa mountaineering community and helped foster cultural exchange between Himalayan and Pacific Northwest climbers. His contributions were highlighted in a 2024 article, “Summit Retreat: A Tribute to Mountaineering Legends,” which chronicled the influence of Phursumba and Nawang Gombu at Mount Rainier and the founding of the Sherpa Buddhist Association to aid Sherpa families affected by high-altitude climbing accidents.

During the summer of 1970, Phursumba Sherpa worked alongside Joseph Patrick Kennedy II, the 17-year-old son of the late U.S. Senator Robert F. Kennedy, who was training as a mountain guide on Mount Rainier. The two became close friends while working for Rainier Mountaineering Inc. That summer, during a trip to the San Juan Islands, Kennedy publicly defended Phursumba when a sheriff reprimanded him for not standing during a flag-lowering ceremony, a cultural misunderstanding stemming from Phursumba’s recent arrival in the United States. Kennedy later recounted the incident in a newspaper interview, describing his intervention and the prejudice they encountered.

== In Media ==
Nawang Gombu – Heart of a Tiger

Phursumba Sherpa appeared in the 2012 documentary Nawang Gombu – Heart of a Tiger, directed by Bev Chapman and produced by Mason Video. The 47-minute film, created in India and the United States, features Phursumba reflecting on the life and legacy of Nawang Gombu Sherpa, with whom he shared deep personal and mountaineering ties.

- "My folks died when I was very little. Gombu and my sister, they raised me. For Sherpa people, for my people, he's just like their caretaker. He keeps the tribe together. And if I have one quarter of his quality in my blood, I'll consider myself very, very successful."

Sherpa – The Proving Grounds

Phursumba Sherpa appears in the documentary Sherpa – The Proving Grounds (2002), in which he reflects on the influence of Tenzing Norgay and the formative role of the Himalayan Mountaineering Institute in his early life. Speaking about his training and mentorship, he stated:

- “Tenzing is Gumbu’s uncle, and I kind of grew up under his wing. And he was kind of hard on me. So he wanted to really, really make me a hardcore Sherpa. So he always gave me extra work, always pick on me. But, like I said, at that time I didn't like it. I was a boy when I first did the course, right here I became a man.”

He also reflected on Sherpas' deaths on Everest while he was climbing in the Himalayas, he stated in the documentary:

- “As long as I was here, three of them died, you know. So then we used to carry them, get a couple of porters, go down maybe a thousand feet. Some of them were good, good as new, but some of them died trying to get back. Then, what do we do? Take them down to ten thousand feet where the tree level is. Then a couple of porters, they would chop down trees and… what do you call it… cremate them. And take their ashes back home, wherever they're from, like Bombay, Delhi.”

He is credited in the documentary as being the Location Manager & Interpreter and an HMI Instructor.

Sikkim Adventure

Phursumba Sherpa was featured in Sikkim Adventure, a short documentary film showing him leading a group of American trekkers through the Sikkim Himalayas. The party ascended to Goecha La Pass (over 16,000 ft), a vantage point offering panoramic views of Kangchenjunga, the world’s third-highest mountain. The film also highlights Sikkim’s unique status, formerly a Himalayan monarchy before joining India in the 1970s and its restricted-access mountain regions, where special permits are required. The documentary was filmed, edited, and produced by Mele Mason of Mason Videos and was released online in 2014.
