= J. M. Ahivasi =

Indian painter and art educator (1901–1973)

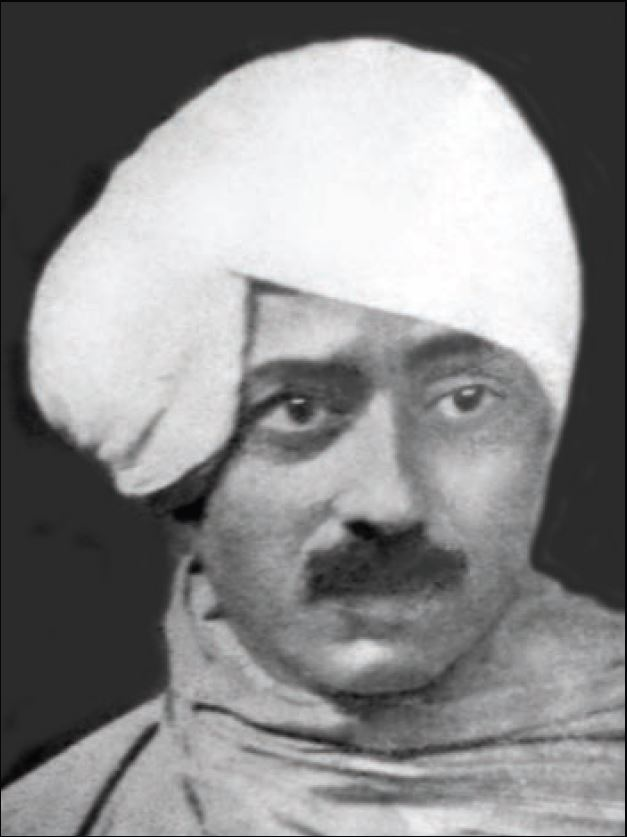
- Born: 6 July 1901; Mathura, Uttar Pradesh
- Died: 29 December 1973 (aged 72)
- Education: Sir J. J. School of Art, Mumbai
- Known for: Painting

Jagannath Murlidhar Ahivasi (6 July 1901 – 29 December 1973) was an Indian painter and art educator. He is well known for his paintings in the Indian style inspired by the techniques and style of the Indian miniature paintings. J. M. Ahivasi was at the forefront of the revival of Indian Art in Western India from early to mid 20th century.

== Early life and education ==
Ahivasi was born on 6 July 1901 in Baldeo near Mathura, Uttar Pradesh. His mother had died when he was just four years old after which he was solely raised by his father. His father Murlidhar was a musician at Porbandar in Gujarat, popular as a temple Kirtankar (Kirtan performer). Ahivasi's childhood was spent in a musical, spiritual and religious environment. At the same time, he was also introduced to the traditional murals and religious paintings of Nathdwara, home of the mansion music and kirtan tradition.

Ahivasi's father wanted him to follow his footsteps and become a temple singer. However, he was inclined towards painting from an early age and therefore decided to become a painter. After some training in art initially, he taught drawing at the Anjuman School in Porbandar itself. It was here that Ahivasi had met Maldev Rana, who mentored him and encouraged him to pursue art. Rana explained him about the importance of modern art education in painting and advised him to visit Mumbai and pursue the same. Initially, Ahivasi took admission at Ketkar Art Institute in Girgaon. After completing the first two years of the course here, he joined the Sir J. J. School of Art. In 1926, he completed G. D. Art in painting with first class. During his education, he received the prestigious Dolly Cursetjee Prize. Other awards include the Mayo Medal in 1927 for his academic achievements and a gold medal in an exhibition held at Surat in the same year.

== Career ==
=== Bombay Revivalist School ===
When Ahivasi was a student at the Sir J. J. School of Art, Captain W. E. Gladstone Solomon was the principal of the school. The latter was an advocate of Indian art and promoted the Bombay Revivalist School, an art movement that nurtured and preserved Indian art traditions. Solomon started a special class to promote this where G. H. Nagarkar was appointed as its teacher. Ahivasi studied painting in the Indian Renaissance style under Nagarkar and subsequently, developed his own style.

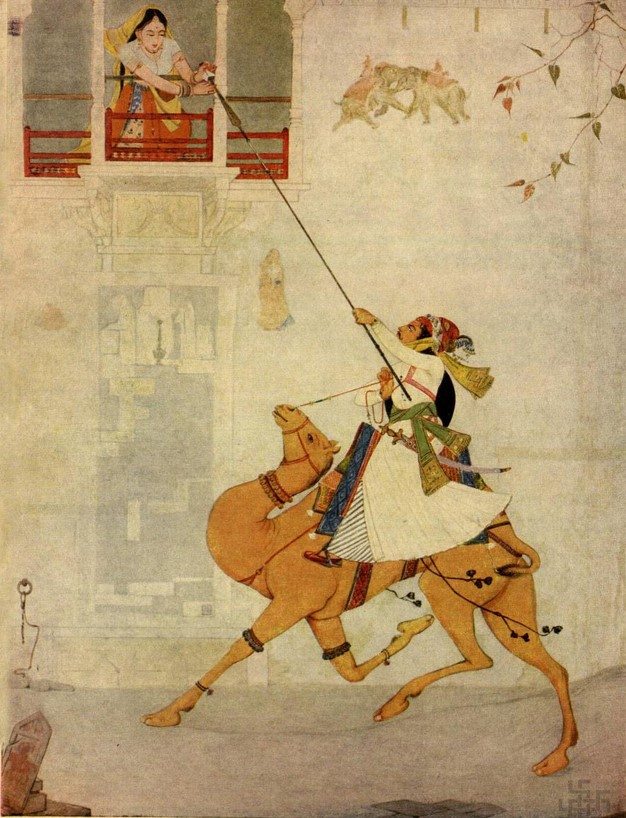
Message (1927) by J. M. Ahivasi in the Rajput miniature style

Ahivasi's paintings were inspired by the Indian miniatures of Jain, Rajput and Kangra style. Solomon was intrigued by the beauty and elegance of his line of art. He was also impressed by the thick and opaque watercolour paintings of Ahivasi that looked different from the wash technique adopted by the Bengal School of Art along with Nagarkar and others at the Bombay Revivalist School. Thereby, Solomon awarded Ahivasi with a scholarship for the mural decoration class in 1927. His painting in the Rajput style titled Message received a gold medal at the Bombay Art Society exhibition in 1927. From 1932 to 1935, he was also appointed as a Fellow in Painting at the school.

=== Murals at Rashtrapati Bhavan ===
In the year 1927, a nationwide competition was organized which invited designs for decorating the rooms of the Imperial Secretariat (now Rashtrapati Bhavan) in New Delhi. The committee, appointed by the Government of India, received about 24 entries from across India who had sent their preliminary drawings. They accepted the work offered by seven of these exhibitors, including two art schools. Sir J. J. School of Art was selected to decorate the Committee Room A (now the office of Minister of State of Home Affairs), based on their initial designs for the competition.

Black & white reproduction of the watercolor sketch titled Drama prepared by J. M. Ahivasi

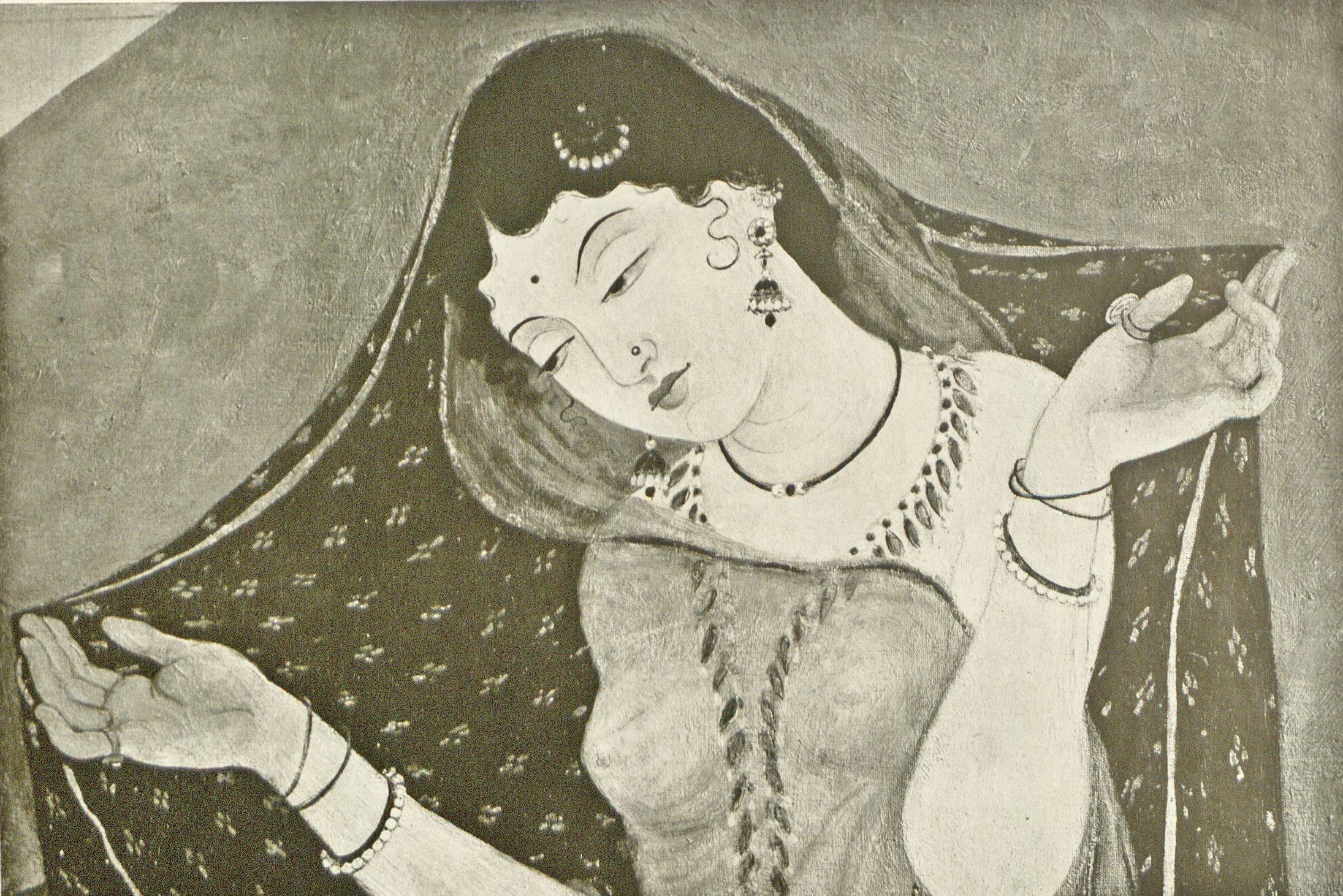

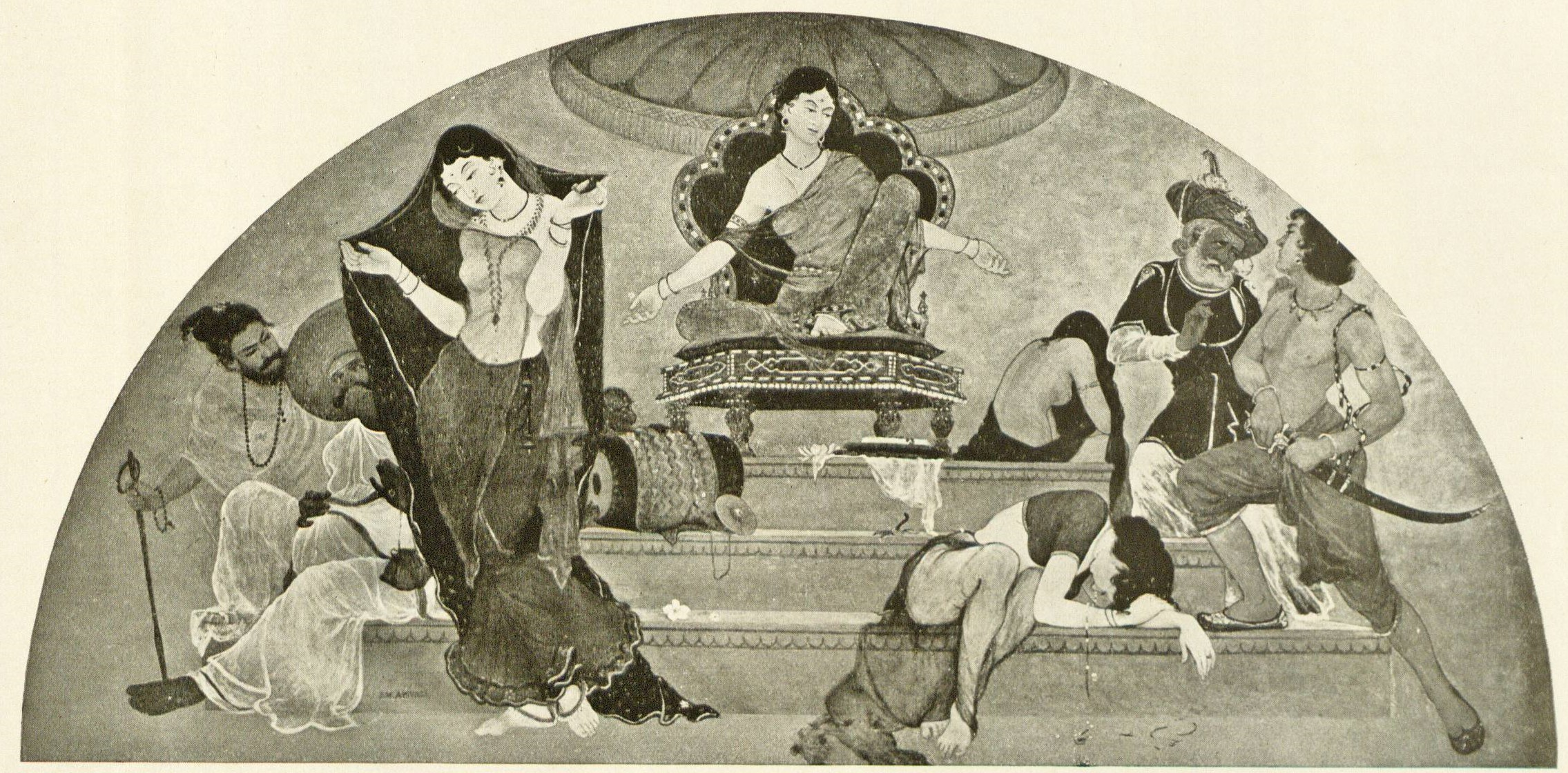

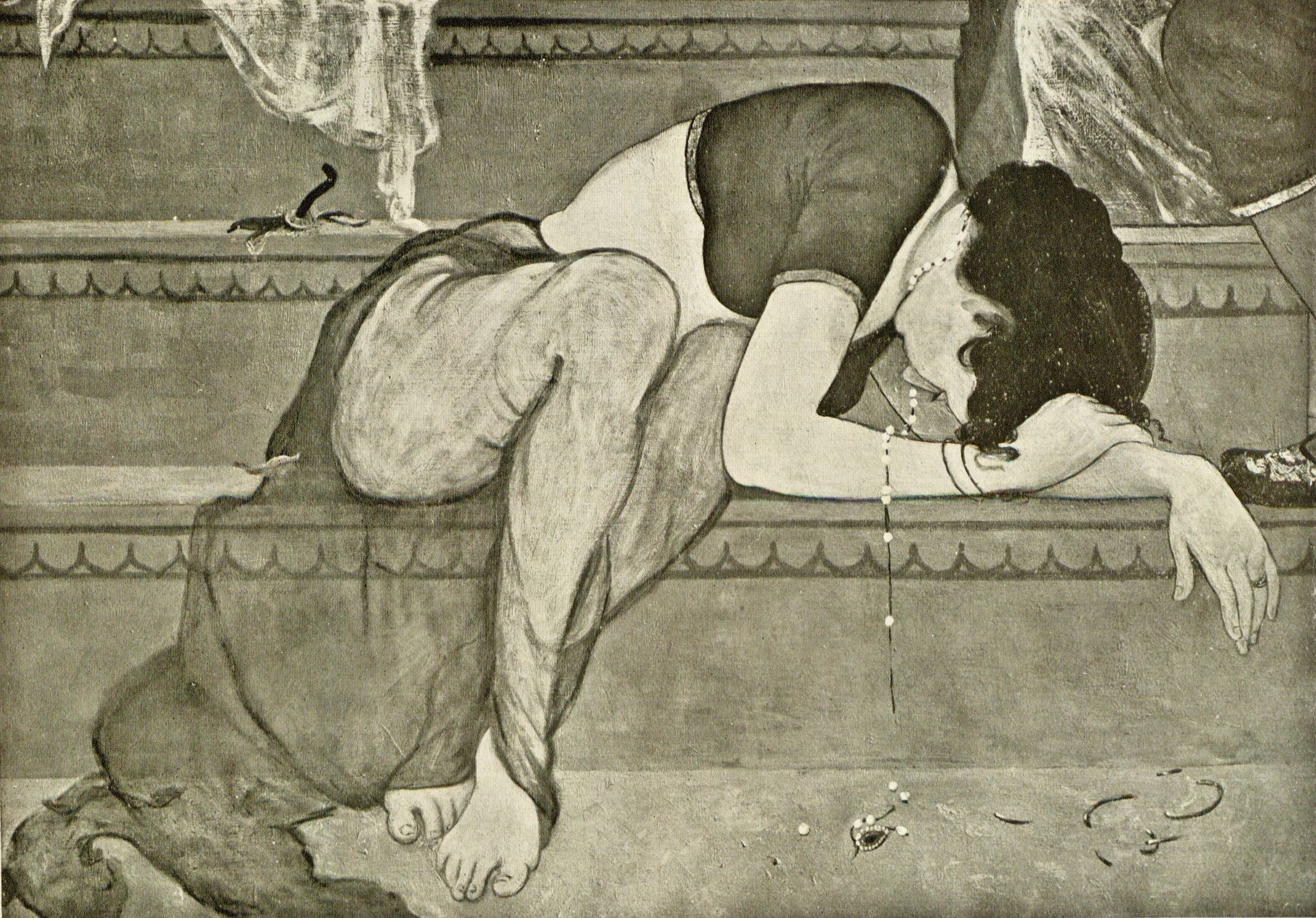

Ahivasi was a part of the group which had executed this project. He was given the task of creating murals for two lunettes on the dome of the room. The two artworks that he designed were Painting and Drama. Painting is based on the Rajput miniature style with a modern approach of subject handling and composition. Whereas, Drama has a touch of Western realistic style with a dramatic figure composition. Two contrasting emotions are depicted on the either side of a woman who is seated on the throne in the center. These paintings were created in oils on canvas and later attached to the walls of the room. The final work began from the month of November 1928 and was completed in August 1929.

=== The Indian Class ===
Considering the inclination and mastery of Ahivasi in the Indian miniature tradition, Solomon started a special class for the same in 1929, as an extension of the Bombay Revivalist School. Ahivasi was appointed as the teacher of this Indian Class which was designed in Indian style under his guidance. Students had to remove their footwear before they entered the classroom. Desks were laid out on a satranji (carpet) instead of the typical donkey easels. One had to put their board on the desk and sit cross-legged on the satranji. Ahivasi himself sat on raised platform with bolsters on the either side. His attire was completely Indian which included a pheta, long coat, dhoti with simple sandals and occasionally, a Khadi cap. In this Indian environment, many things were taught – from how to hold a brush, how to effectively use colour theory and how to preserve the integrity of the image. They followed the traditional way of image making - asanasiddhi (poses), reshasiddhi (lines) and then rangasiddhi (colours). Officially termed as the Class of Indian Design and Composition, this class was quite popular in the school. Only those students with an aptitude for oriental design were admitted to it which resulted in production of quality paintings that felt Indian and were original in style.

After the retirement of Solomon from the School of Art in 1936, Charles Gerrard became the head of the school. The latter was inclined towards the art movements and modernism of the Western art world. Gerard and Ahivasi disagreed over the role of traditional Indian art and modern art values. Also, the art world in India was changing rapidly at this time. Students in the 1940s and 50s did not agree with the hardworking and traditional methods of Ahivasi. Although, they remained silent out of respect. It was only later that some students like F. N. Souza, Tyeb Mehta and Baburao Sadwelkar refused to sit in his class and as a result, they had to make separate arrangements. Ahivasi was already worried about how long his Indian Class will run since the time Gerard became the director. Nonetheless, the class continued until Ahivasi retired in 1956. After his retirement, the then principal J. D. Gondhalekar closed it. Later, Ahivasi was invited to Banaras Hindu University, where he worked as the head of the Faculty of Visual Arts from 1957 to 1966.

Ahivasi had a huge group of friends in Mumbai. After the closure of his Indian Class, he felt sad and expressed it to many, saying that, “Now the roots of Indian tradition have been uprooted.” He had a close relationship with art critic Kanaiyalal Vakil and journalist D. G. Vyas. The traditionalist views of these two thinkers largely influenced the output of Ahivasi. After his death in 1973, artist Shankar Palsikar wrote about him in an article,“The ideological and artistic role of Ahivasi could not evolve with the passage of time. As a result, his field of production remained very limited.”

=== Meeting the Bengal artists ===
During a visit to Kolkata in August 1947, Ahivasi visited Abanindranath Tagore, the pioneer of the revival of Indian Art in Bengal, at his residence. They discussed about traditions in art and how it can be preserved, without being dogmatic about it. Ahivasi also drew a sketch of Tagore in a few minutes, which was later autographed by the latter himself.

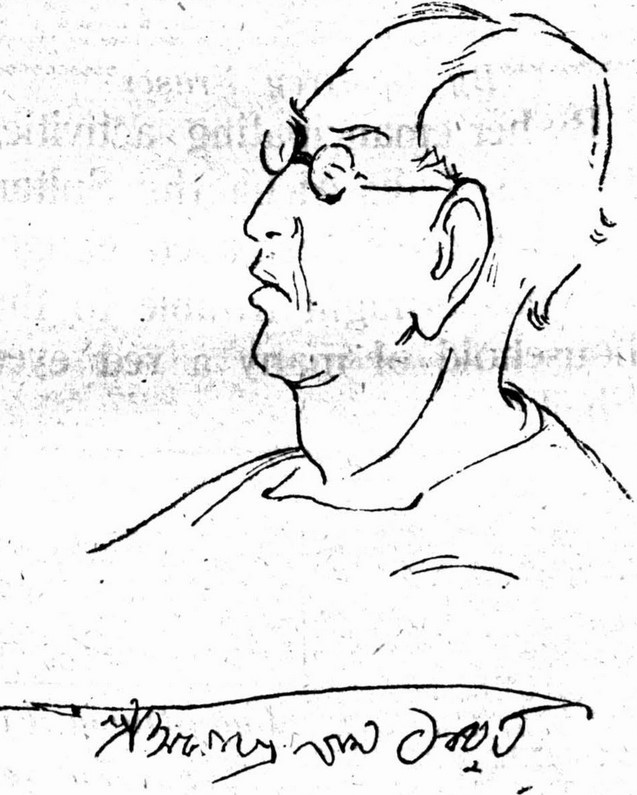
Sketch of Abanindranath Tagore (1947) by J. M. Ahivasi with Tagore's signature at the bottom

Later, Ahivasi also went to Santiniketan and stayed there for two days. Here, he met Nandalal Bose who knew his work well and was pleased to receive him. Since Kala Bhavana was closed that day, Bose got it opened and took Ahivasi on the campus tour. This was followed by a discussion on the methods of teaching art. There had been a history of controversy between the Bengal and the Bombay School of Art. However, this meeting was cordial and promoted a better understanding between the two art schools.

== Other work ==
=== Illustrations ===
During his time as a student and educator, he had visited the caves at Ajanta, Ellora, Elephanta, Bagh, Badami, Sittanavasal and studied the murals there. After seeing his work, the Lalit Kala Akademi in New Delhi had invited him to replicate the murals at Badami and Sittanavasal. The academy was so impressed by his work that they honoured him with a Special Gold Medal in 1956. In 1961, Ahivasi's book Rekhanjali based on Indian sculptures and paintings was published by J. V. Navlakhi and Company, Mumbai.

Ahivasi's painting Departure of Meera was gifted by then Prime Minister of India, Jawaharlal Nehru to Zhou Enlai, then Prime Minister of China. Many pictures of Ahivasi have been collected in the country and abroad. Message and My Father is housed in the Chhatrapati Shivaji Maharaj Vastu Sangrahalaya in Mumbai.

=== Literature ===
Even though Ahivasi was primarily known as an Indian-style painter, he also worked in poetry, music and literature. In 1949, Ahivasi was selected as the President of the Arts Department by the Gujarati Sahitya Parishad at Junagadh, the highest honour given by the organization to an artist. He also worked as the editor of the kirtan collection in Braj Bhasha and was elected as the president of the Brajbhasha Sammelan at Meerut.

== Death and legacy ==
Ahivasi died on 29 December 1973. An exhibition titled The Lost Movement was organized by Chatterjee & Lal art gallery in 2011 which featured the work of Ahivasi and his students.
