= J. D. Gondhalekar =

Indian painter (1909–1981)

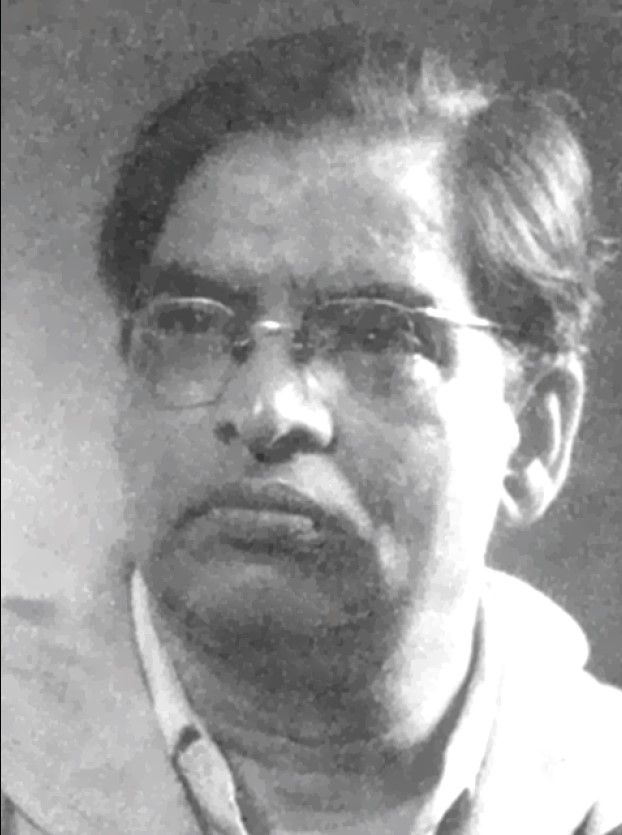
- Born: 21 April 1909
- Died: 4 December 1981 (aged 72)
- Education: Sir J. J. School of Art, Mumbai; Slade School of Fine Art, London
- Known for: Painting; sketching; printmaking; art criticism
- Notable work: Ajoba (1931)

Janardan Dattatraya Gondhalekar (21 April 1909 – 4 December 1981) was an Indian painter, administrator and scholar of Indian & Western Art. He served as the dean of Sir J. J. School of Art from 1953 to 1957.

J. D. Gondhalekar is known for his portrait paintings and sketches on various subjects. He also gave lectures on art, wrote about it and played the flute.

== Early life and education ==
Gondhalekar was born to Dattatraya and Gangabai on 21 April 1909. His family owned a printing business and was well-settled in Pune. He attended primary and secondary school at the Nutan Marathi Vidyalaya in Pune. After completing his matriculation in 1926, he joined Sir J. J. School of Art in Mumbai. In 1931, Gondhalekar obtained his G. D. in Art. As a student here, he won number of prizes and scholarships. These include a bronze medal and a scholarship for mural decoration from 1931 to 1933. His peers at the Sir J. J. School of Art included Gopal Deuskar, Angela Trindade and Ambika Dhurandhar.

Gondhalekar then conducted private art classes in Pune from 1934 to 1937, which was followed by a sojourn to England for higher education. He completed his Diploma in Fine Art from the Slade School of Fine Art in London. Additionally, he also studied wood engraving and etching at Central School of Art and Craft from 1937 to 1939.

== Career ==
After returning to India, Gondhalekar painted murals for the Nawab of Palanpur State. Between 1940 and 1948, he worked as an art director at Brilliant Pictures and Navyug Film Company in Pune. Some of these films include Municipality (1941), Tujhach (1942), Pahili Mangalagaur (1942), Pundalik (1944), Naya Tarana (1944) and Din Raat (1946). After the closure of Navyug Film Company, he stayed in Delhi for a few years. In 1950, he received a fellowship from UNESCO to study the nuances of art preservation and restoration at Laboratoire central des Musées de Belgique in Belgium.

=== Administration ===
Gondhalekar was appointed as the dean of Sir J. J. School of Art in 1953. During his tenure, he implemented new schemes in art education and undertook several new activities. Firstly, he organized the inaugural State Art Exhibition in 1953 of the then Bombay State with an intention to improve art education at schools and colleges. Secondly, based on his experience in Europe, he suggested pedagogical changes at the school which had a marked departure from the existing norms. Meanwhile, the centenary of Sir J. J. School of Art was celebrated with grandeur in 1957. Around this time, the Government of Bombay was planning to divide the school of art into three separate institutions. Gondhalekar opposed this proposal and eventually resigned from his post as the government remained firm on their decision.

Gondhalekar was appointed as a member on many art committees of government and autonomous organizations such as University of Bombay Centenary Celebrations Committee, Sampat Memorial Prize Committee, jury of National Exhibition of Art by Lalit Kala Akademi in 1957 and Board of Trustees at the Prince of Wales Museum of Western India from 1953 to 1954 & 1956 to 1958. Additionally, he delivered art related lectures on Indian and western radio.

=== Publishing ===
It was in 1959 that the Bennett, Coleman & Company had appointed Gondhalekar as an Art Director for their newspaper The Times of India. Here, he experimented with the design by combining fine art and applied art together in order to make the newspaper more attractive. After the contract with The Times of India terminated in 1964, the Government of Maharashtra appointed him as Art Editor of the Marathi Vishwakosh in the following year. Under his guidance, the introductory volume of the same was published in 1965. Between 1965 and 1971, he also wrote several scholarly entries on several artistic traditions for encyclopedia.

With an intention to raise awareness about the art tradition of Maharashtra, a project to restore the 18th-century murals in the palace of Nana Fadnavis at Menavali, Wai was undertaken by Directorate of Arts, Maharashtra State. It was started in 1978 under the aegis of Baburao Sadwelkar and able guidance of Gondhalekar. The main purpose of the project was to preserve and document the frescos by creating their replicas. The responsibility of this project was entrusted to Gondhalekar who had to implement it with the support of faculty and students of Sir J. J. School of Art. However, the project failed to take off due to the non-cooperation of the stakeholders. Nonetheless, Gondhalekar submitted his report titled Project Menavali in the form of a 121-page long research paper to the government in 1980.

=== Artworks ===
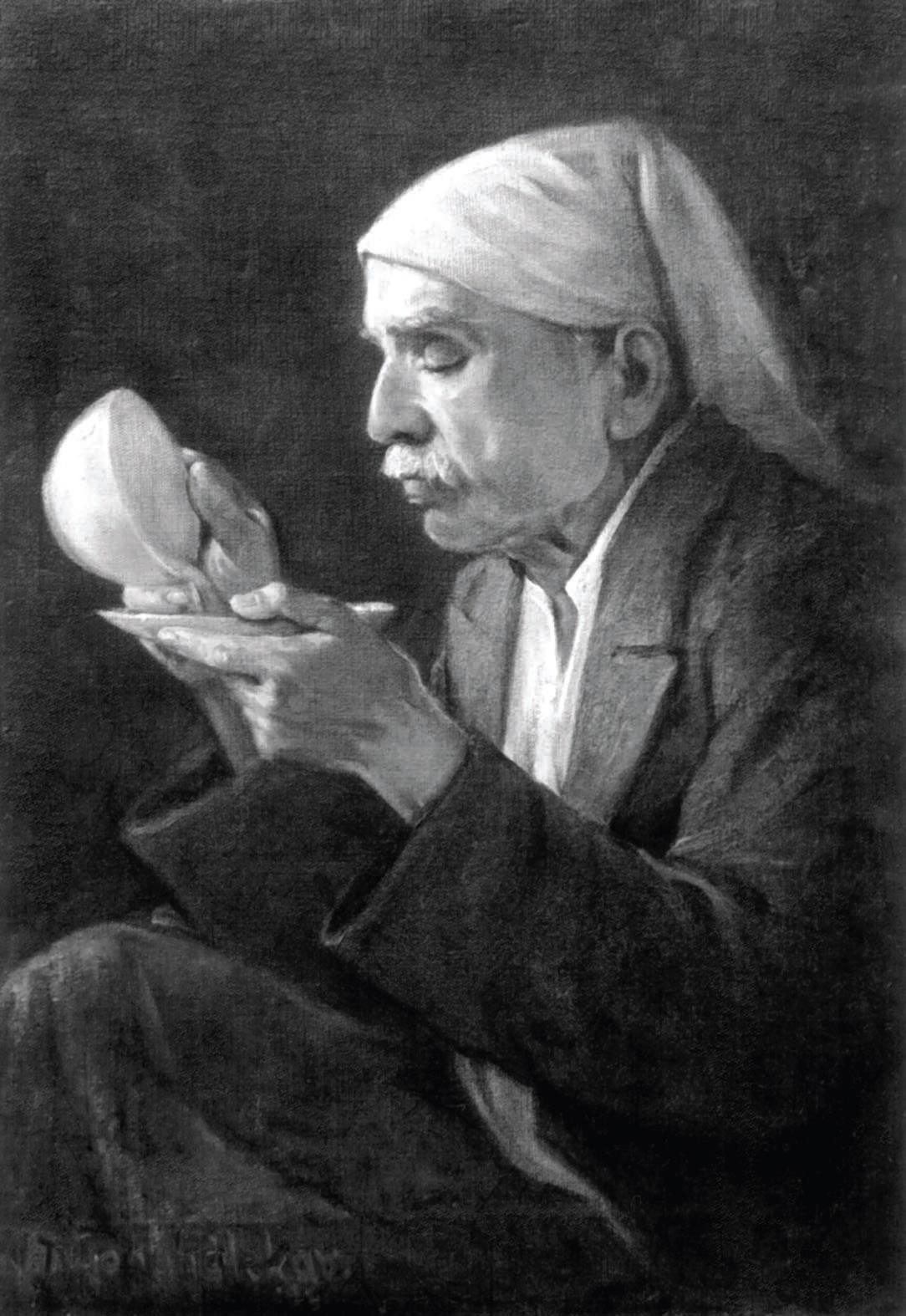
B&W reproduction of Ajoba (1931), oil on canvas by J. D. Gondhalekar

During the 1930s, Gondhalekar drew inspiration from the Indian revivalist art movement of the Bombay Revivalist School. He painted Indian subjects such as Meditating Buddha or Lord Krishna reclining under a banyan tree. These pictures executed in wash technique were in realistic style. There are influences of various European art movements in his artworks which he had learned while studying abroad. However, academic realism remained the mainstay of Gondhalekar. The emotional appeal of his 1931 portrait titled Ajoba (Grandfather) is a testimony to his technical skill and artistic ability. Along with portraits, he also painted numerous realistic landscapes throughout his life. Some of these compositions that he painted between 1940 and 1950 express the melancholy and emotional turmoil of human life. In addition to this, Gondhalekar drew innumerable pen and pencil sketches on various subjects throughout his career. His drawings of clothed, semi-naked and nude people as well as nature, architecture, and animals showcase his mastery over the medium.

Gondhalekar held solo exhibitions of his artworks in cities like Delhi, Mumbai, Brussels and London to name a few. His paintings are housed in the collections of Chhatrapati Shivaji Maharaj Vastu Sangrahalaya, Mumbai and National Gallery of Modern Art, New Delhi.

=== Writing ===
In 1940, Gondhalekar had designed a cover for Sukhi Sansar, a special issue of Sahyadri magazine. The black and white design significantly differed from the usual Marathi magazine covers and a shifted from Marathi middle-class sensibilities. As a result, his work was criticized by magazines such as Zhankar, Dhanurdhari and newspaper like Sakal. Instead of being discouraged in this adverse situation, he took advantage of it by writing about modern trends and ideas in art. His notable articles include Pratik-Chitra Pahnyachi Khari Drishti (The Right way to View Symbolic Art) for Sahyadri magazine in 1940 and Sandhikalatil Chitrakala (Art in the Time of Transition) for Manohar magazine in December 1949. Through these writings, he aimed to infuse modern perspective towards art among the masses.

=== Music ===
Gondhalekar developed a taste for music from an early age. He used to play ragas from Hindustani classical music on his flute during his school days. This continued later in his life when he played flute in the garden of Sir J. J. School of Art surrounded by his students during the break time.

== Personal life ==
Gondhalekar had married Sushila Mone of Indore in 1934. They had three daughters.

== Death and legacy ==
Gondhalekar died on 4 December 1981. J. D. Gondhalekar Foundation, an organization in his name has been established in Pune, which organizes exhibitions and provides help to art students in need of support. Gondhalekar's paintings were part of the exhibition titled Master Strokes VI organized by Jehangir Art Gallery in 2007. Another exhibition of his paintings and sketches titled Old Master – J. D. Gondhalekar on was held at India Art Gallery in Pune from 2 to 8 February 2008. In his birth centenary year, a commemorative book on his life and works was published by Jyotsna Prakashan.
