= Sainik Samachar =

Centenary edition of Sainik Samachar in 2009.

Sainik Samachar is a journal about the India's Armed Forces. The journal is published every fortnight in thirteen languages including English on behalf of the Ministry of Defence.

Sainik Samachar traces its descendants from the magazine Fauji Akhbar that started its publication on 2 January 1909.

The first issue was published in Urdu and Roman Urdu. It was published from Allahabad. It was felt that a journal for the Armed Forces must be published for the Defence Services and among the British Raj officials as well.

== Pre independence ==
The cover of the first issue, dated 2 January 1909, showed some Indian troops with spikes in hand, but soon the front cover began to flaunt many countries and place under the British Empire, where then the sun literally did not set, and where Indian troops serving the British Indian Army were posted. The countries and places ranged from well-known France, Belgium, Egypt and Africa and to such obscure names as Assaye, Tel-El-Kebir and Tira. Not unexpectedly, the pages of Fauji Akhbar used to be filled with news from Great Britain and other countries of the Empire like grant of annual rank by the King- Emperor and summary of court cases in London. Indian news used to feature the Viceroy and senior British officers’ activities and movements with little or no news about Indians. Petty and often derogatory news about Indians used to be highlighted from the very first issue.

Roman Urdu used to accompany the Urdu version so that the British officers and soldiers could learn and speak in Urdu while talking to the troops and to civilians. Awards to, and recognition of, Indians in the Army also found a place in its pages, probably to boost their morale. The tours and movements of British Army Officers were regular in almost every issue of the thirties. This was probably done to enable touring officers meet ex-soldiers at places where they went. There also used to be regular news about the food grains production and their prices, particularly in the prosperous Punjab State. As the shadows of the Second World War gathered, European and American politics with an obvious bias towards the British policy began to predominate.

Pictorial supplements running to eight pages with emphasis on the Royalty and printed on art paper were carried, three to four times in a year. The meetings of Soldiers’ Boards, the antetype of the present day Sainik Boards, used to be extensively reported. One Mrs. Bell used to send a “Cable from London”, for almost every issue in the thirties’ and the forties’. Cartoons, showing typical British military characters, had become common in the forties. A pictorial section, the antetype of “News in Pictures” on second (inside) cover these days, was introduced in 1928, featuring wonders like Forth Bridge in Scotland, horse-show in English country agricultural exhibition, British Airship, R-100 under construction, death and funeral of Field Marshal Earl Haig, who was given a reception at Buckingham Palace in 1922 etc. along with news of the troops, probably for the nostalgic British soldiers, serving in the then British Indian Army. The quality of reproduction on simple newsprint was remarkably good. Like Mrs. Bell’s column, there also used to be a regular serial, “Advice to Young Soldiers”, in which the troops were given tips to improve their career.

The Silver Jubilee Number on completion of 25 years was published from Simla on 4 May 1935, featuring on its silvery cover the King-Emperor George V and the Queen-Empress, with royal news and visuals on the inside pages. The Delhi Durbar of 1911 with photos of the king and queen arriving at Bombay on 2 December 1911 was printed with care. Fauji Akhbar did not remain confined to being merely an ‘Army Newspaper’, but in mid-thirties carried a sub-title, ‘The Leading Journal of Rural Reconstruction’. In the 4 January 1903 issue when the sub-title was first used, there was nothing particular about rural India, but a column was started in which various news about villages like "Rural Reconstruction Work in Shahpur District" and bulls for breeding and 'gallantry resolve for villagers' began to feature.

== Second World War ==
With the Second World War Fauji Akhbar, still remaining the 'Leading Journal of Rural Construction', adjusted itself fast to war coverage. For example, the bombardment of Barcelona in the Spanish Civil War was featured on the front page of 28 Jan, 1939 issue. The next issue featured Adolf Hitler's speech regarding his colonial claims. The Spanish situation with particular reference to France and the British Parliament’s sanction of 800 million for defence hit its first page. The Spanish Civil War was extensively covered. In the 18 March 1939 issue the news of German troops occupying Czechoslovakia was flashed. However, notwithstanding such prompt and extensive war coverages, Fauji Akhbar retained its normal character of catering to the troops in peace and carried its usual features. "The London Letter", a regular feature in the 1930s, included items of common British interest and as early as 8 April 1939 the news of BBC televising by its mobile unit a boxing event, was carried by Fauji Akhbar. With coverage of war news the circulation of Fauji Akhbar went up by leaps and bounds and at one time exceeded even three lakh copies and a supplement on war news had to be issued. It is probably unknown to many that during the Second World War an Overseas Edition was started from Cairo for the Indian troops fighting in Middle East, Africa and in East European countries and was edited by Colonel ANS Murthi.

The image of the British Raj persisted throughout till 1947 and the Viceroy’s addresses were extensively covered. Whatever be the occasion, Mr. Winston Churchill's appeals and exhortations to the troops, expectedly, found a good coverage. The Indian Freedom Movement and Swadeshi launched by Mahatma Gandhi came in for a lot of ridicule and banter but were not ignored. The Overseas Edition was a tabloid which Indian troops out of the country looked forward to and read avidly for war news in the home front. The visuals from the war front emphasizing the Allies, were flaunted on covers like British desert patrol. Anthony Eden, the then British Foreign Secretary General Sir John Dill at Cairo, an Indian sepoy on the front line etc. Aerial views of Delhi, the new capital of India since 1912, and Air-Raid precautions in Calcutta and London were particularly highlighted. The cartoons on the second cover (inside) made fun of Hitler and the advancing Japanese forces. The advance of the War, particularly the success of the Allied Forces in Middle East, captured the centre-spread and features in the early forties and India’s involvement in the War came to be praised in its pages. The posthumous award of the Victoria Cross to Subedar Richpal Ram of Raj Rif, the second Indian to be awarded the Victoria Cross during the War, was flashed on the cover photo of the soldier who died during the fight for Kerenin.

In the 6 September 1941 issue India’s war effort was editorially praised. A regular column, “Spotlight on the War and the pictures of Indian troops in Egypt and Middle East” must have made the issues highly sought after by the Indian troops abroad.

== Post independence ==
After the Independence, the publication was suspended temporarily but resumed operations in 1954 the magazine has undergone a sea change in its content and printing.

Sainik Samachar is published in more languages to cater to the needs of the Soldiers from different parts of India and from different Languages. Now Sainik Samachar is being printed in 13 Languages, probably the only Armed Forces Magazine in the world, that is being published in 13 languages.

With the advancement in printing technology, Sainik Samachar also quickly adorned multi colour. It became a multi coloured magazine.

== Centenary celebrations ==
Sainik Samachar's centenary celebrations were held in New Delhi. The Defence Minister A. K. Antony released a coffee table book titled 'Soldiering On...'

'Soldiering On...' is a compilation of history of the nation through the eyes of Sainik Samachar. It was well received and is accepted as a collectors piece.

=== Milestones ===
1909 : Begins publication as a 16-page weekly as Fauji Akhbar from Allahabad (office located at Simla) with a limited circulation in Urdu and two-page Roman Urdu among JCOs, NCOs and Jawans of the Indian Army. Printed in bold type with outer inter-spacing to facilitate reading in the light of the kerosene lamp by the troops in far-flung areas. Priced at an anna a copy, annual subscription being Rs 4 only.

Hindi edition starts from Simla.

Punjabi edition starts from Simla.

1911 : Fauji Akhbar starts publication from Lahore, resulting in a substantial reduction in the cost of production. A single copy was priced at 3 pice and the rate of annual subscription was brought down to Rs 2.4 (Rs 2.25 paise) and a concessional rate of Rs 2 was fixed for the units. The Urdu edition changes from type composition to lithography. Last two pages are reserved for lessons in Roman Urdu.

1914 : Fauji Akhbar leaps into limelight by publishing news about the First World War. The number of pages is increased.

A daily supplement, carrying First World War news, gets started which continued till the termination of hostilities.

1923 : The English edition makes its debut by merely rendering into English what appeared in other language editions. The printing of all the editions is taken over by the Army Press, Simla from the Mufid-i-Am Press, Lahore .

'News in Pictures' on the second cover becomes a regular feature.

The first cover of Fauji Akhbar begins featuring names of important countries, where Indian troops had served. A pictorial supplement of places and events of military interest is inserted. A system of lucky numbers is introduced in vernacular editions and a subscriber, getting the copy with one of the ten unduplicated numbers, gets a cash prize of Rs 5.

1935 : Silver Jubilee Number published from Simla.

1939 : A two-page bi-weekly supplement to Fauji Akhbar on news of the Second World War is added and given free to the subscribers. Overseas edition in Roman Urdu starts from Cairo for the benefit of Indian troops in the Middle East. Pictorial content and reading matter expand. The nucleus staff of 15 gets swelled to 60 including a number of experienced journalists. Rate of subscription is enhanced. The circulation shoots up and at one time exceeds one lakh.

1940 : The two-page supplement on war news, introduced in September 1939, gets replaced by a four-page bi-weekly called Jang-Ki-Khabren (War News) in English, Urdu, Hindi, Roman Urdu, Punjabi, Tamil, Telugu and Marathi. The circulation of the bi-weekly reaches three lakh copies.

1944 : Gorkhali edition starts as Gorkha Samachar from Simla.

1945 : Tamil edition starts from Simla.

The bi-weekly Jang-ki-Khabren is rechristened as Jawan.

1947 : Gorkhali edition of Jawan is introduced to replace Gorkha Samachar.

The office of Fauji Akhbar moves from Simla to Delhi as the heights of the Himalayas were not considered conducive to efficient round-the-year work and timely dispatch of copies.

Fauji Akhbar turns over a new leaf to serve the services in free India in a spirit of patriotism and nationalism.

Publication is suspended for about a year due to the sudden migration of staff and printers.

1948 : Arrangements for printing with Mufid-i-Am Press, printers for the infant Fauji Akhbar, who had meanwhile shifted from Lahore to Delhi after Partition.

1950 : Publication of bi-weekly Jawan stops.

1954 : Fauji Akhbar is renamed as 'Sainik Samachar' for all its nine editions, namely English, Urdu, Roman-Hindi, Hindi, Punjabi, Gorkhali, Marathi, Tamil and Telugu.

1959 : Golden Jubilee Number is published in all the editions on completion of fifty years.

1964 : Malayalam edition starts from Delhi.

1969 : Diamond Jubilee edition published on completion of 60 years.

1971 : Bengali edition starts from Delhi. The post of Editor-in-Charge to control and supervise proliferating editions in Indian languages.

1983 : Three more language editions 'Assamese, Kannada and Oriya' get approved by the Government.

Eight language editions get temporarily suspended for lapse of printing arrangements. English and Hindi editions are published from Govt. of India Press, Minto Road, New Delhi.

1984 : Platinum Jubilee Number in English and Hindi editions.

1997 : Starts printing in four colours. The weekly becomes a fortnightly. From this year, the price changes from Rs 0.50 to Rs 5 with an annual subscription of Rs 100.

2009 : Hundred years of 'Sainik Samachar'. Release of a coffee-table book "Sainik Samachar 1909-2009: Soldiering On".
