= Dhari =

Dhari may refer to:

== People ==
=== Given name ===
- Dhari Almutairi, Kuwaiti paralympic athlete
- Dhari Al-Anazi (born 2000), Saudi footballer
- Dhari Ali al-Fayadh (1918–2005), Iraqi politician
- Dhari Hambir Malla Dev, or Dhari Hambeera, king of the Mallabhum (1620–1626)
- Dhari Malla, king of the Mallabhum (1554–1565)
- Dhari Said (born 1987), a Kuwaiti footballer

=== Surname ===
- Harith al-Dhari (1941–2015), an Iraqi Sunni Arab cleric
- Jamal al-Dhari (born 1965), a leader of the al-Zoba tribe in Iraq

== Places ==
- Dhari, Gujarat, India
  - Dhari Junction railway station
  - Dhari (Vidhan Sabha constituency)
- Dhari, Nepal

== Other uses ==
- Dhari (headdress), an elaborate dancer's headdress used by Torres Strait Islander men

== See also ==
- Dari (disambiguation)
- Dhadi (disambiguation)
- Dharani (disambiguation)
- Dharan (disambiguation)
