= Dhurandhar (disambiguation) =

Dhurandhar is a 2025 Indian spy thriller film by Aditya Dhar.

Dhurandhar may also refer to:

== Arts and entertainment ==
- Dhurandhar (soundtrack), soundtrack of the 2025 film by Shashwat Sachdev
  - "Dhurandhar", title track of the 2025 film, a remake of "Na Dil De Pardesi Nu" by Charanjit Ahuja, Muhammad Sadiq and Ranjit Kaur
- Dhurandhar: The Revenge, 2026 Indian film by Aditya Dhar and a sequel to Dhurandhar
  - Dhurandhar: The Revenge (soundtrack), soundtrack of the 2026 film by Shashwat Sachdev

== People ==
- Dhurandhara, a rakshasa minister of Prahasta in the ancient Indian epic Ramayana
- Dhurandhara, an epithet of the Hindu deity Shiva
- M. V. Dhurandhar (1867–1944), Indian painter
- Ambika Dhurandhar (1912–2009), Indian artist
- Nikhil Dhurandhar, Indian physician

== See also ==
- Dharanidhar (disambiguation)
- Dhundhar, historical region of Rajasthan, India
- Dhundari language (also spelled Dhundari), an Indo-Aryan language spoken in the Dhundhar region of India
- Dhundhara, village in Rajasthan, India
- Dhuandhar Falls, waterfall in Madhya Pradesh, India
- Dhuandhaar, a 2021 Indian film
