= Dar =

Dar or DAR may refer to:

== Settlements ==
- Dar es Salaam, the largest city of Tanzania and East Africa
- Dar, Akhnoor, village and former Zamindari in Akhnoor, Jammu and Kashmir
- Dar, Azerbaijan, a village
- Dar, Iran, a village
- Darfur, is a region in Sudan

== Companies ==
- Dar Al-Handasah, an international engineering consulting company.

== People ==
- Dar (tribe), a Kashmiri tribe in India and Pakistan
- Aleem Dar, Pakistani cricketer and international umpire
- Ami Dar, Israeli-American nonprofit leader
- Asif Dar, Pakistani-Canadian boxer
- Abdul Majeed Dar, commander of Hizbul Mujahideen
- Igal Dar (1936–1977), Israeli basketball player
- Mukhtar Dar, Pakistani-born artist and activist
- Noam Dar, Israeli-Scottish professional wrestler
- William Dar (born 1953), Filipino horticulturist and government administrator
- Dar Heatherington (born 1963), Canadian politician
- Dar Lyon, an English first-class cricketer
- Dar Robinson, American stunt performer and actor
- Dar Williams, folk-pop artist

=== Fictional characters ===
- Dar, the main character in the 1982 fantasy film The Beastmaster and the 1999–2002 Canadian Beastmaster TV series
- Dar Adal, one of the main characters in the TV series Homeland

== Acronyms ==
- Data at rest
- dar (disk archiver), a disk archiving tool similar to tar
- Darzhavna Aeroplanna Rabotilnitsa (Държавната аеропланна работилница) or DAR (ДАР), a Bulgarian aircraft manufacturer
- Daughters of the American Revolution
- Definite article reduction, a linguistic phenomenon
- Department of Agrarian Reform
- Designated Airworthiness Representative, a person authorized to issue Airworthiness Certificates in the United States
- Digital Assets Repository
- Disulfiram-alcohol reaction
- Display aspect ratio
- Drone Anti-Radar, German loitering munition

== Transport ==
- Dominion Atlantic Railway
- DAR, IATA airport code of Julius Nyerere International Airport, Dar es Salaam, Tanzania
- DAR, National Rail station code of Darlington railway station, County Durham, England
- Daru railway station (station code), Tangerang Regency, Banten, Indonesia

== Other uses ==
- Дар, Russian title of Vladimir Nabokov's book The Gift
- DAR!, an autobiographical webcomic by Erika Moen
- dar, ISO 639-3 code for the Dargwa language

== See also ==
- Darr (disambiguation)
- Dhar (disambiguation)
