= Dharanidhar =

Dharanidhar may refer to:

- An epithet of the Hindu deities Vishnu, Shiva, Shesha
- The Himalayas
- Dharanidhar Basumatari, Indian politician
- Dharanidhar Das, Indian politician
- Dharanidhar Jena, Indian politician
- Dharanidhar Naik, Indian tribal leader from Odisha
  - Dharanidhar University, in Keonjhar, Odisha
  - Dharanidhar Medical College and Hospital
- Dharani Dhar Awasthi (1922–Lucknow), Indian lichenologist, known as the "Father of Indian Lichenology"

== See also ==
- Dharani (disambiguation)
- Dhar (disambiguation)
- Dharani Dharan, Indian film director and screenwriter in Tamil cinema
- Dhurandhar (disambiguation)
