= Mohammed Bashar al-Faidi =

Muhammad Bashar al-Faidi is the spokesman for Harith Sulayman al-Dhari, the chairman of the Association of Muslim Scholars.

On November 16, 2006, the interior minister of Iraq, Jawad al-Bolani, a Shi'ite, announced that Dhari was wanted on a charge of inciting violence. "The government's policy is that anyone who tries to spread division and strife among the Iraq people will be chased by our security agencies." Muhammad replied on Al Jazeera television and stated, "The decisions of this government are worthless because it only rules the Green Zone."

== Quotes ==
- "This government should resign before the Iraqi people force it to resign," Faidi told Al-Jazeera television. "The association calls on its people to be calm."
- Faidi accused the interior minister "of supporting terrorism by covering for [Shi'ite] militias that are killing the Iraqi people."
