= Dhar (disambiguation) =

Dhar is a city in Madhya Pradesh, India.

Dhar may also refer to:

== India ==
- Dhar (guerrilla warfare), a military tactic in Indian history
- Dhar (surname), a surname of Bengali or Kashmiri origin
- Dhar (Lok Sabha constituency), in Madhya Pradesh
- Dhar (Vidhan Sabha constituency), in Madhya Pradesh
- Dhar, Parbhani, in Maharashtra
- Dhar district, India, in Madhya Pradesh
- Dhar railway station, in Dhar district, Madhya Pradesh
- Dhar State, a princely state of British Raj

== Other uses ==
- Dhar, Mauritania
- Dhar District, Yemen, in the Shabwah Governorate
- Dhar Braxton, American singer

== See also ==
- Dar (disambiguation)
- Dhara (disambiguation)
- Dharani (disambiguation)
- Dharanidhar (disambiguation)
