= Digital Assets Repository =

The Digital Assets Repository (Arabic: مستودع الأصول الرقمية or DAR) is a system developed at the Bibliotheca Alexandrina (BA) by the International School of Information Science (ISIS) to create and maintain digital library collections and preserve them to future generations.

The project's main goal is to build a digital resources repository by supporting the creation, use, and preservation of varieties of digital resources as well as the development of management tools. These tools help BA library to preserve, manage and share digital assets. The system is based on evolving standards for easy integration with web-based interoperable digital libraries.

DAR is designed to manage the full lifecycle of a digital asset: its creation and ingestion, its metadata management, storage and archival in addition to the necessary mechanisms for publishing and dissemination. In 2011, DAR system architecture was revamped and upgraded to its 3rd release in order to answer challenges that face an institution in consolidating its assets.

== Access ==
BA announced launching the largest Arabic digital library worldwide, maintained by DAR in April 2010 with 130,000 books. In 2011 and ongoing, the repository reached 185,000 Arabic books out of a 5-language collection of 300,000 books.

DAR provides free public access to the library's digitized collections through a web-based search and browsing facilities for Internet visitors directly via DAR's website. The site supports three languages interface: Arabic, English and French, (Note: The homepage defaults to the English language interface.) and is listed at Egypt's Government Services Portal (Bawaba) website. (Note: Bawaba (egypt.gov.eg) lists DAR website under Service Providers section of the English site interface. (Home > Main Menu > Service Providers > Alexandria Library > Digital Assets Repository))

DAR website allows its online visitors to access full content of the public domain digitized books in the repository, but limits access to preview only (5%) snippet for the copyrighted digitized books with 10 pages minimum. Moreover, it provides different viewing options for repository contents, in addition to other tools such as: searching content; using annotation tools; adding sticky notes; tagging, rating and commenting on books; sharing books on social networks; and creating own virtual bookshelves per user. (Note: English website interface locates Sign Up and Member Login links at the top of its homepage, but no reference anywhere on the site about registration process and benefits.)

== See also ==
- Institutional repository
- Internet Archive
- Islandora
