= Ambika Dhurandhar =

Indian artist (1912–2009)

Ambika Dhurandhar FRSA
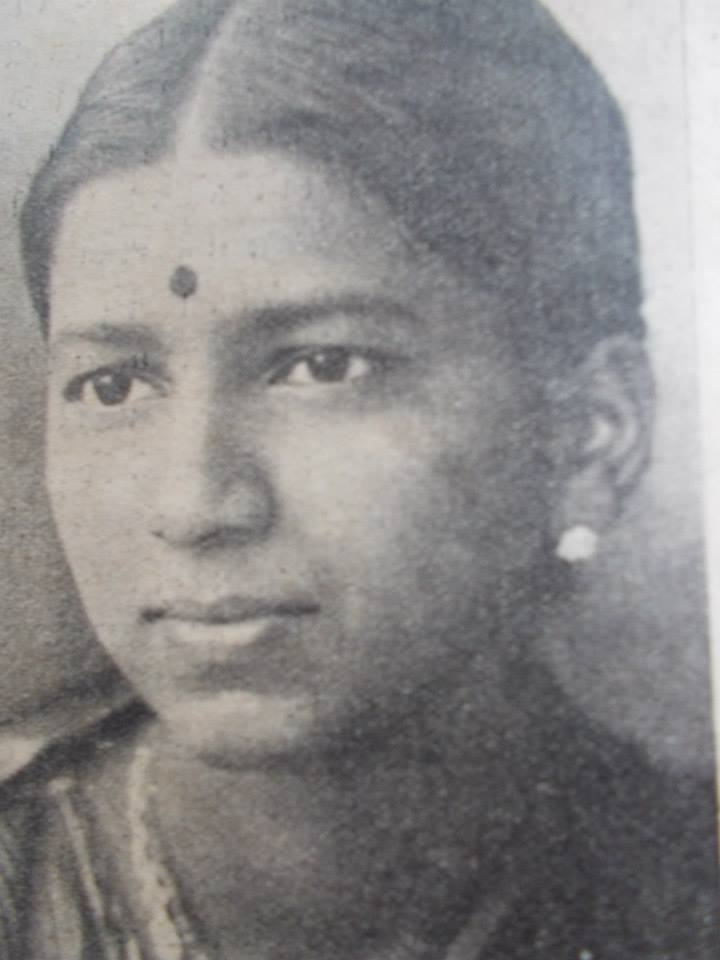
- Born: 4 January 1912
- Died: 3 January 2009 (aged 96)
- Education: Sir Jamsetjee Jeejebhoy School of Art
- Known for: Painting
- Movement: • Indian Independence Movement • Samyukta Maharashtra Movement
- Father: M. V. Dhurandhar

Ambika Mahadev Dhurandhar, FRSA (4 January 1912 – 3 January 2009) was an Indian artist who was among the first few women to complete the G. D. Art (Painting) course from Sir J. J. School of Art in Mumbai. She was the daughter of the renowned artist M. V. Dhurandhar, who was a former student, teacher and the first Indian director of Sir J. J. School of Art.

She painted under the guidance of her father, cared for his vast collection of artworks and lived under their stylistic influence throughout her life. As a result, the effect of the golden age of Academic art at the Sir J. J. School of Art stayed with her for lifetime.

== Early life and education ==
Initially, the Dhurandhar family lived in the Thakur house. Ambika went to Karve University’s Girls High School on Naoroji Street which was located close to their residence. After a few days, the school had shifted to another building at Girgaon. When they lived at the Thakur house, she would travel to Girgaon with other girls living nearby. However, after shifting to Ambasadan - their Khar residence, the Dhurandar family thought that sending her alone to Girgaon via railway and trams was risky. By that time, her education was complete up to sixth standard. Subsequently, her studies up to the intermediate grade were completed at home itself. As Ambika was inclined towards arts from the beginning, her father took her to the School of Art and got her admitted there.

Ambika had joined the first year painting classes and subsequently passed all her painting exams with flying colors. She stood second in the degree course which she completed in 1931, becoming the second woman to do so. Angela Trindade was one of her peers at that time. She was the daughter of António Xavier Trindade, who was also a teacher at the School of Art. Further, Ambika also became a Fellow of the Royal Society of Arts, London in the year 1939.

== Career and influences ==
Mythological and historical scenes were the major subjects of Ambika's work; in this she shared her father's focus. She had mastered the figure compositions and used different manifestations of human figures in her creations. Her paintings Coronation of Shivaji Maharaj (Shivrajyabhishek) and Goddess Ambika with her Yoginis that were displayed at the Bombay Art Society exhibition were a testimony to this. She was awarded a silver medal by the society at this event.

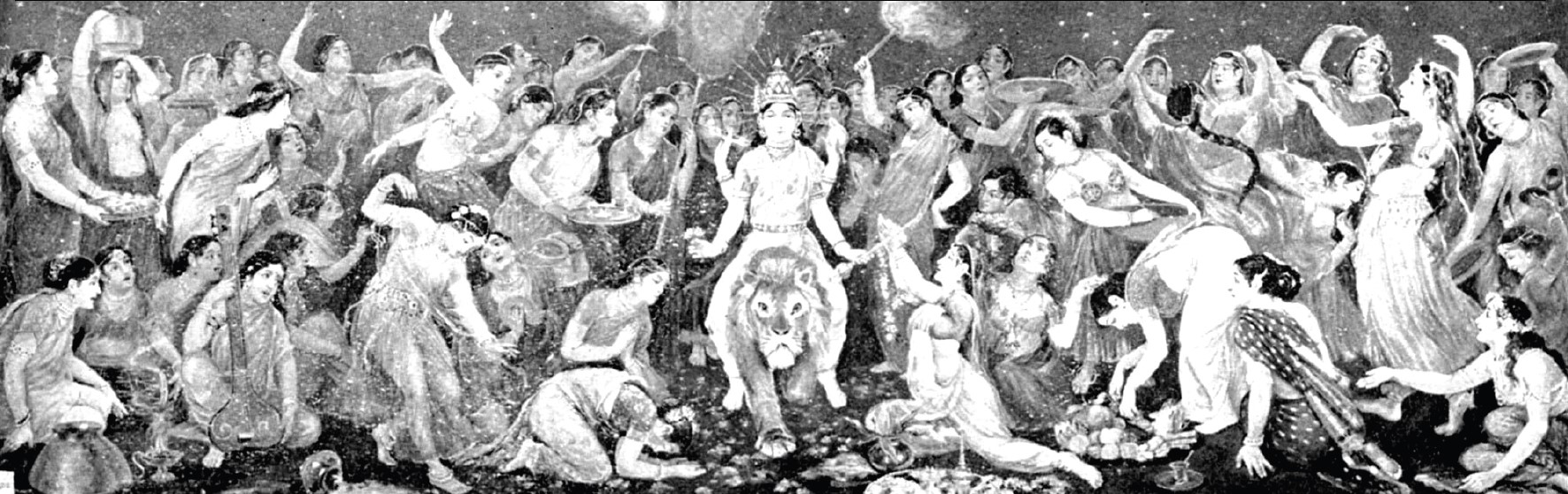
Goddess Ambika with her Yoginis (1941) by Ambika Dhurandhar

Following this success, her paintings were exhibited at places like Shimla, Delhi, Bangalore, Mysore, and Kolhapur to name a few. She received critical acclaim and also won several awards at these exhibitions.

=== The Baroda competition ===
In order to mark the Diamond jubilee of the coronation of Maharaja of Baroda in 1935, it was decided to felicitate him with an official scroll by the people of the kingdom. The scroll was supposed to be presented in a gold-silver plated box. An open competition was organized which invited designs for the outer cover of this box. Ambika participated in this contest by sending her drawings according to the specifications mentioned in the guidelines. From the numerous entries that were received, her design was among the two creations that were selected. She was awarded a prize of Rs. 500 and got a chance to meet the maharaja along with her father.

=== Travels in India and abroad ===
Ambika travelled with her family in India and then independently when she went abroad. Her father was frequently invited by several royals to create commissioned art pieces for them. After accepting the invitations from the royals of Baroda, Gwalior, Indore, Kolhapur etc. she got the opportunity to travel and stay in these royal dwellings with her family.

During her European tour, Ambika had visited Madame Tussauds exhibition in London. In this exhibit, she saw life-sized sculptures of world-famous personalities like Gandhi, Hitler, Mussolini, Stalin, Napoleon, Abyssinian Haile Selassie, the British royal family to name a few.

=== Life after father’s death ===
After the death of her father in 1944, she took up the responsibility of looking after his artworks and put them up for exhibitions with the help of his students. In 1949, she started the Dhurandhar Kalamandir (Dhurandhar Art School) in Khar area of Mumbai and taught art to a number of students.

She was actively involved in the Indian independence struggle and later, in the united Maharashtra movement. She had also painted a few artworks for these events. Ambika had made notes about her memories of travels from 1930 to 1950. A book titled Majhi Smaranchitre (My Memories) was published based on these stories in 2010 after her death. This book archives the art history and serves as an important material describing the art production, art teaching, business and trade during the hey days of the royal families. She was unmarried and lived alone at the Dhurandhar residence Ambasadan in Khar. She died in 2009 due to illness in the old age.
