= Dharani (disambiguation) =

Dharani is a genre of Buddhist chants or incantations. It may also refer to:

- Dharani (goddess), another name of the Hindu Earth goddess
- Dharani pillar, Buddhist pillars inscribed with dharanis
- Dharani (director), a former Indian film director
- Dharani Dharan, an Indian film director
- Dharani (film), an Indian Tamil-language film

== See also ==
- Dharan (disambiguation)
- Dhari (disambiguation)
- Dhara (disambiguation)
- Dhar (disambiguation)
- Dharanidhar (disambiguation)
