= Darr (disambiguation) =

Darr is a 1993 Bollywood film.

Darr may also refer to:

- Aḍ-Ḍārr, one of the names of God in Islam, meaning "Distressor".
- Darr (surname)
- Darr, Nebraska, an unincorporated community in the United States
- darr, abbreviation for down arrow
- Darr Mine Disaster, a 1907 mine disaster in the United States
- Darr @ the Mall, a 2014 Indian horror film

== See also ==
- Dar (disambiguation)
