= Dharan (disambiguation) =

Dharan is a sub-metropolitan city in Nepal.

Dharan may also refer to:

- Dhāraṇā, concentration in Yoga
- Dharan Kumar (born 1983), Indian Tamil composer
- Dharani Dharan, Indian Tamil filmmaker
- Dharan F.C., an association football club based in Dharan, Nepal

== See also ==
- Dharani (disambiguation)
- Dhari (disambiguation)
- Dhahran, a town in Saudi Arabia
