= Dhadi =

Dhadi may refer to:

- Dhadi (music), a genre of folk ballads from Punjab, India
- Dhadi (caste), a subgroup of the Mirasi of Punjab, India, traditionally performers of the dhadi ballads
- Dhadi State, a former hill state of India, located in the Simla Hills

== See also ==
- Dadhi, village in Punjab, India
- Dhari (disambiguation)
