= Dhara =

Dhara may refer to:

- Dhara (deity), an earth god in Hinduism
- Dhara (city), capital of the Paramara rulers of central India, now called Dhar
- Dhara, Jammu and Kashmir, a village in Jammu and Kashmir, India

== See also ==
- Dhar (disambiguation)
- Dharani (disambiguation)
- Aaj Ki Dhara, a 1979 Indian Hindi-language film
