= Bibliotheca Alexandrina =

Major library and cultural center in Alexandria, Egypt

Library of Alexandria
- مكتبة الإسكندرية; Bibliotheca Alexandrina

- View of Bibliotheca Alexandrina in Alexandria
- 31°12′32″N 29°54′33″E
- Location: Alexandria, Egypt
- Type: National library
- Established: 16 October 2002; 24 years ago

Access and use
- Members: 16,322 (2012)

Other information
- Director: Ahmed Abdullah Zayed
- Website: bibalex.org

The Bibliotheca Alexandrina (Latin, 'Library of Alexandria'; Egyptian Arabic: مكتبة الإسكندريه, romanized: Maktabat al-’Iskandariyya, Egyptian Arabic pronunciation: [mækˈtæb(e)t eskendeˈɾejjæ]) (BA) is a major library and cultural center on the shore of the Mediterranean Sea in Alexandria, Egypt. It is a commemoration of the Library of Alexandria, once one of the largest libraries worldwide, which was lost in antiquity.

The complex was officially inaugurated in 2002. At the time of its construction, the reading room was the largest in the world.

The library offers shelf space for eight million books, containing books in the Egyptian, classical Arabic, English, and French languages. In 2009, the library received a donation of 500,000 books from the Bibliothèque nationale de France (BnF) making the Bibliotheca Alexandrina the sixth-largest Francophone library in the world.

The complex also houses a conference center, several specialized libraries, multiple museums and art galleries, a planetarium, and a manuscript restoration laboratory.

== History ==
Mediterranean Sea side of the architecture of the Bibliotheca Alexandrina in Alexandria, Egypt, October 2020

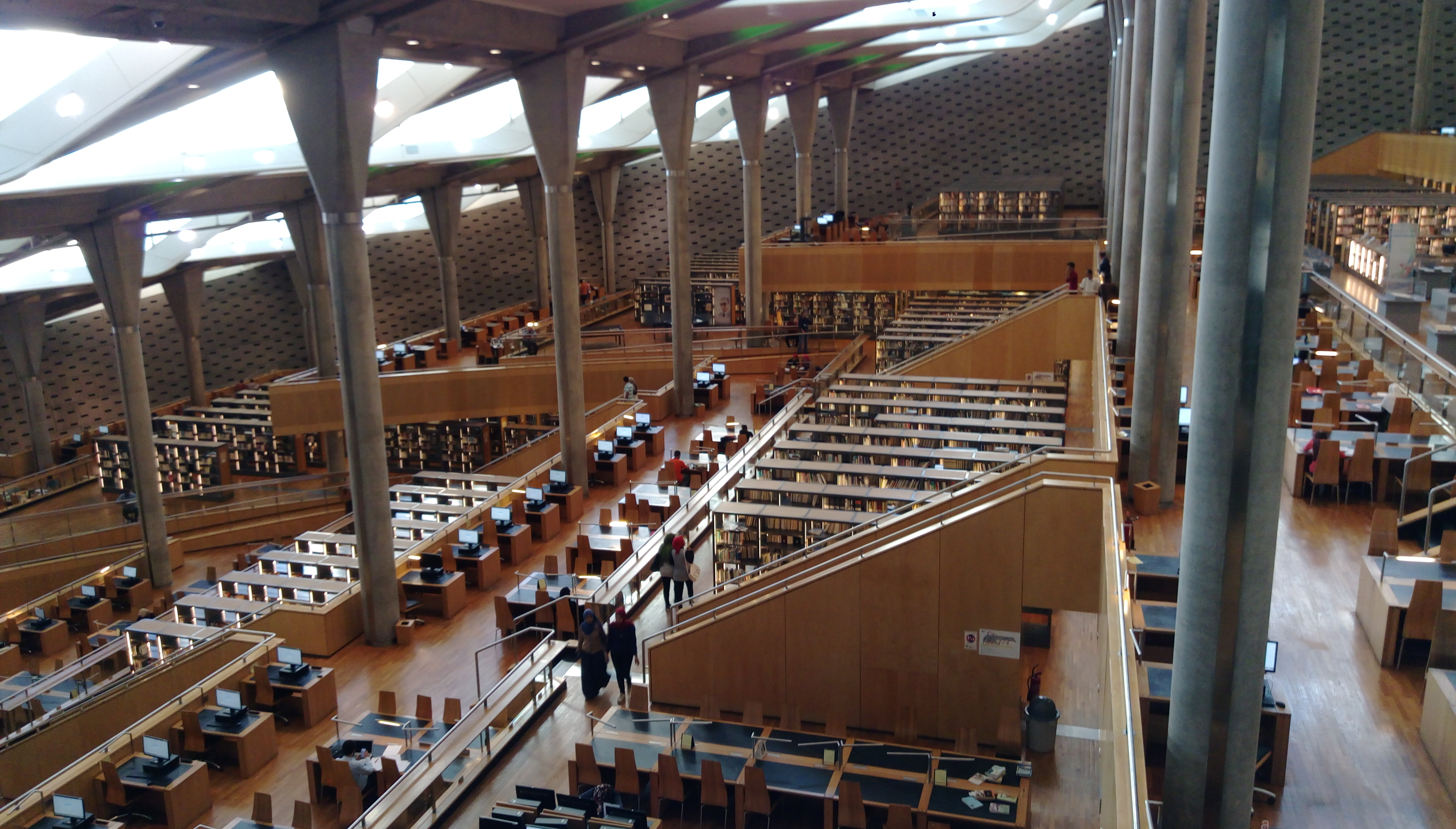
Inside the Bibliotheca Alexandrina, built during the 1990s on the Mediterranean Sea coastline near the harbor of Alexandria, Egypt. It was opened in October 2002.

The idea of reviving the Library of Alexandria dates back to 1974, when a committee set up by Alexandria University selected a plot of land for its new library between the campus and the seafront, close to where the ancient library once stood. One leading supporter of the project was former Egyptian President Hosni Mubarak, along with a partnership with UNESCO.

UNESCO organized an architectural design competition in 1988 to choose the design. The competition was won by Snøhetta, a Norwegian architectural office, among 524 other entries. UNESCO also created an International Commission for the Bibliotheca Alexandrina. The first pledges were made for funding the project at a conference held in 1990 in Aswan along the upper Nile River with US$65 million, mostly from the MENA states. Construction work began in 1995, and, after some additional US$220 million had been spent, the complex was officially inaugurated on 16 October 2002.

The Internet Archive donated US$5 million to the BA, including 10 billion web pages from over 16 million sites, 2000 hours of Egyptian and U.S. television broadcasts, 1000 archival films, 100 terabytes of data stored on 200 computers, and a bookscanning facility for local books. The library also received a supplementary donation of 500,000 books from the Bibliothèque nationale de France in Paris.

== Features ==
Bibliotheca Alexandrina pool

The library has shelf space for eight million books, with the main reading room covering 20,000 square metres (220,000 sq ft) on eleven cascading levels. At the time of construction, the reading room was the largest in the world. The complex also houses a conference center; specialized libraries for maps, multimedia, for serving the blind and visually impaired, young people, and children; four museums; four art galleries for temporary exhibitions; 15 permanent exhibitions; a planetarium; and a manuscript restoration laboratory.

The main reading room stands beneath a 32-meter-high glass-panelled roof, tilted out toward the sea like a sundial, and measuring some 160 m in diameter. The walls are of gray granite, carved with characters from 120 scripts. The characters carved into the granite wall were designed by Norwegian artist Jorunn Sannes, as part of the Snøhetta design team.

== Services ==
The main library can hold up to eight million books. The library provides access to print on demand books via the Espresso Book Machine.

The Taha Hussein Library contains materials for the blind and visually impaired using special software that makes it possible for readers to read books and journals. It is named after Taha Hussein, the Egyptian professor of Arabic and literary critic who was himself blinded at the age of three.

Contains book collections of Nobel Prize Laureates in Literature from 1901. The Nobel Section was inaugurated by Queen Silvia of Sweden and Queen Sonja of Norway on 24 April 2002.

=== Museums ===
==== Antiquities Museum ====
Established in 2001, the Antiquities Museum is an archeological museum that is situated within the library. It holds approximately 1,316 artifacts. The collection includes underwater antiquities from the Mediterranean seabed near the Eastern Harbour and the Bay of Abukir. The museum provides descriptions of artifacts in three languages: English, Arabic, and French.

==== Manuscript Museum ====
The Manuscript Museum provides visitors and researchers with rare manuscripts and books. Established in 2001, the Manuscript Museum contains the world's largest collection of digital manuscripts. The Manuscript Museum operates alongside the Manuscript Center.

==== Sadat Museum ====
This museum contains many personal belongings of the Egyptian president, Anwar Sadat. The collections include some of his military robes, his Nobel Prize medal, his copy of the Qur'an, a few of his handwritten letters, pictures of him and his family, and the blood-stained military robe he wore on the day of his assassination. In 2023, the museum also retrieved the passport of the president from an online auction in the United States. The museum also contains a recording in his voice of part of the Qur'an and assorted newspaper articles written about him.

=== Permanent exhibitions ===
The Our Digital World exhibition displays some of the library's digital projects, including digital archives of former presidents, the Science Supercourse, and the Encyclopedia of Life. Additionally, digital versions of books, such as Description de l'Égypte and L'Art Arabe, are available.

The World of Shadi Abdel Salam exhibition contains works of Egyptian film director and screenwriter Shadi Abdel Salam. The work was donated by his family. The Impressions of Alexandria exhibition is divided into two sections: Alexandria as seen by Artists and Travelers and Cosmopolitan Alexandria: a Photographic Memory.

The Culturama is a hall that consists of a 180-degree panoramic interactive computer screen with a diameter of 10 meters that is made up of nine separate flat screens arranged in a semicircle and nine video projectors controlled by a single computer. It was developed by the Egyptian Center for Documentation of Cultural and National Heritage (CULTNAT) and holds its patent in 2007.

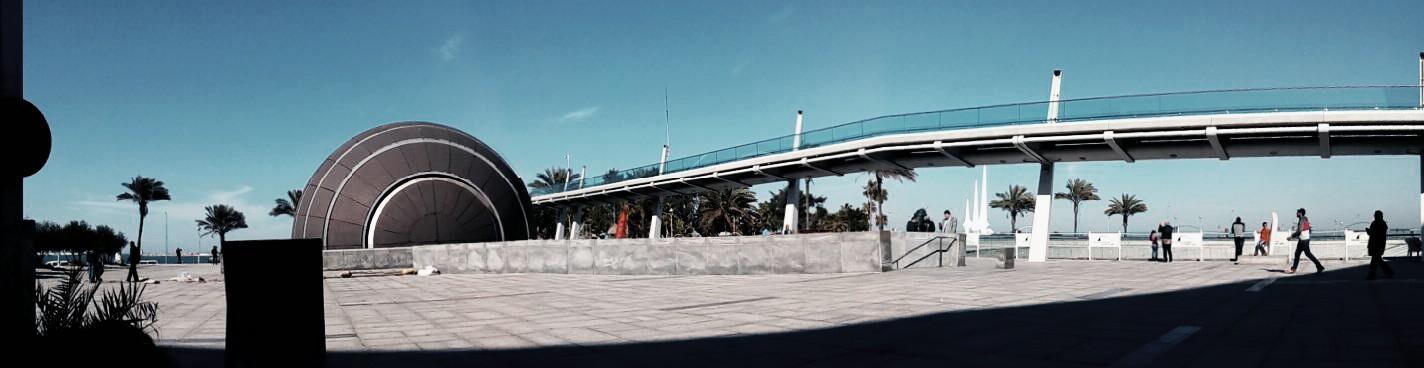
Panoramic photo for planetarium

=== Digital Assets Repository ===
The Digital Assets Repository (DAR) is a system developed at the Bibliotheca Alexandrina by the International School of Information Science (ISIS) that maintains digital library collections as well as providing free public access to the library's digitized collections through web-based search and browsing facilities via DAR's website.

== Management ==
Per Presidential Decree No. 76 in 2001, the Bibliotheca Alexandria is managed by a Council of Patrons, a Board of Trustees, and a Director. The founding director was Ismail Serageldin, who served until May 2017. He was succeeded by manager Moustafa El Feqy.

The Board of Trustees shall number no less than fifteen and no more than thirty, of whom five shall be ex-officio members of the Egyptian Government, namely the Minister of Higher Education and Scientific Research, the Minister of Culture, the Minister of Foreign Affairs, the Governor of Alexandria and the President of the University of Alexandria.

== Post-revolutionary involvement ==
While the library was shut down during the 2011 Egyptian revolution, young adults were seen in a circle around the building to protect against looters and vandals. Students from neighboring universities make up 80% of Bibliotheca Alexandrina patrons. The Bibliotheca Alexandrina held a variety of symposiums in 2011, emphasizing the 2011 Egyptian revolution. Other topics included in these symposiums were social work. All of these events were freely available to the public.

== Criticism ==
Many allege that the library is a white elephant, which serves as little more than a vanity project for the Egyptian government. Furthermore, there are fears that censorship would affect the library's collection.

The building's architecture (which imitates a rising sun) upset some who believed too much money was being spent on construction rather than the library's actual collection. Due to the lack of available funds, the library held only 500,000 books in 2002; however, in 2010, the library received an additional 500,000 books from the Bibliothèque nationale de France. The library relies on donations to buy books for its collections.

On its opening day, an exhibition in the library's Manuscript Center drew international criticism for including the anti-semitic fabricated text, The Protocols of the Elders of Zion, alongside the Bible and the Torah in a display of monotheistic religious holy books. The director of the Manuscript Center, Youssef Ziedan, initially justified its inclusion in an Egyptian newspaper article. In response to the criticism, the director of the library ordered that The Protocols be removed from the exhibition, prompting a statement from Ziedan on his personal website that the quotes attributed to him in the article were "fabricated groundless lies" and acknowledged that The Protocols was a fabricated and racist work.

== See also ==
- Bibliotheca Alexandrina's 100 Greatest Egyptian Films
- Planetarium Science Center
