= Planetarium Science Center =

Coordinates: 31.208984°N 29.908143°E

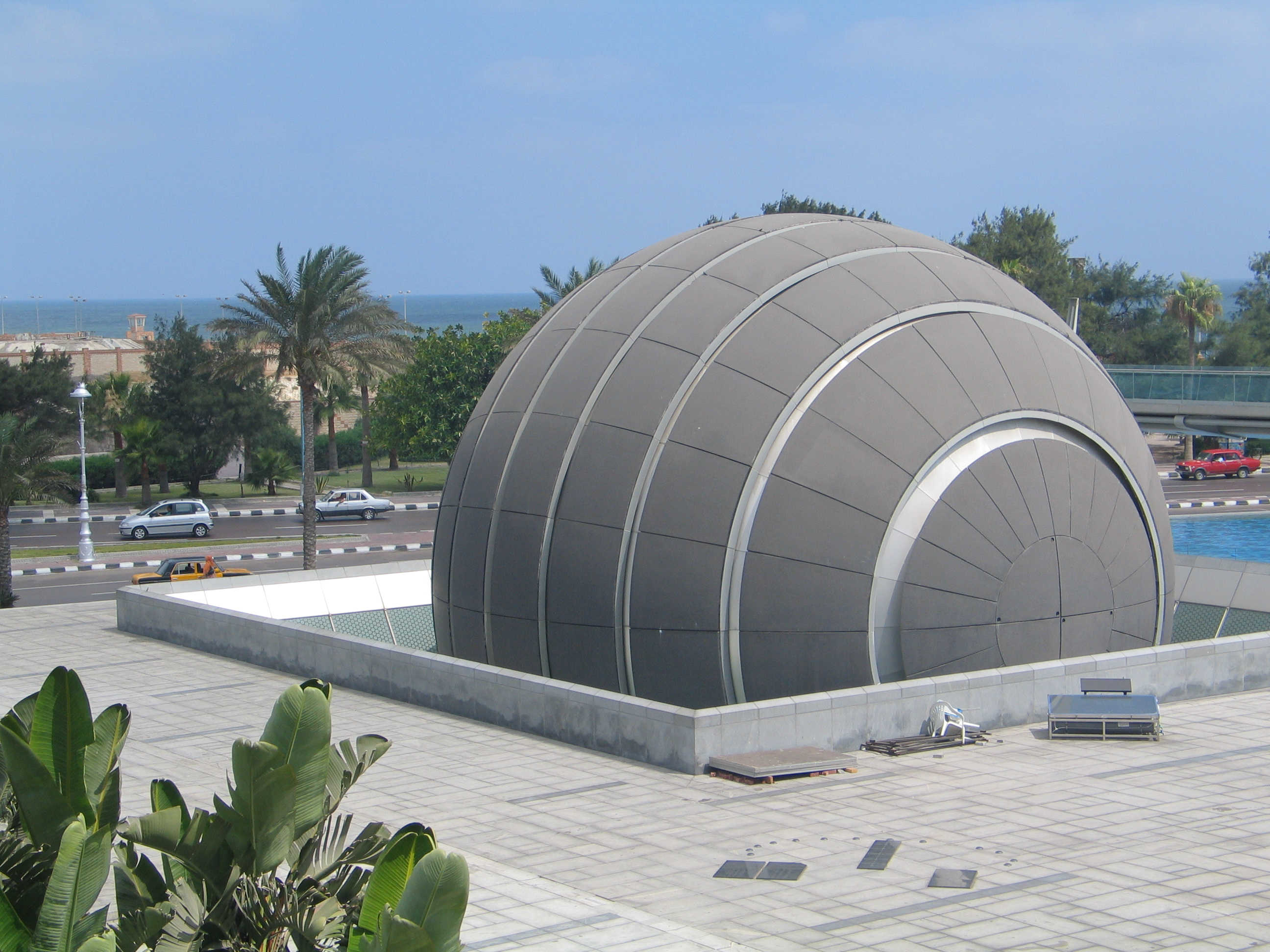
Outside view of the planetarium dome

The Planetarium Science Centre (PSC) is a department in the Bibliotheca Alexandrina located in Alexandria, Egypt. It promotes science centers as an educational tool.

== Structure ==
=== Pre-Historic Animal Park ===
The Science Park has a Dinosaur Park that houses models of many prehistoric animals.

=== ALEXPloratorium ===
The ALEXPloratorium is located next to the Planetarium, where visitors can interact with multiple exhibits that cover various scientific topics, most commonly physics and astronomy.

== Programs and events ==
The PSC's Remote Sensing Workshop program introduces the scientific principles of remote sensing and offers hands-on applications. The RoboAlex Center at the Alexploratorium offers instruction in robotics. The participating groups design, program, and test robots on a playing field to accomplish certain missions. The result of an alliance between FIRST and LEGO is the FIRST Lego League Challenge (FLL). The FLL is an international hands-on, sport-like robotics program that was intended for children aged 9–14.

=== Eratosthenes ===
Eratosthenes is an annual festival that the Bibliotheca Alexandrina organizes to promote science and heritage among school students. The Festivities of 2003–2008 evolved around measuring the Earth's circumference, inspired by the Greek mathematician and poet Eratosthenes.

=== Intel BASEF ===
The PSC, in collaboration with Intel, organizes the Intel Bibliotheca Alexandrina Science and Engineering Fair (Intel BASEF), which is hosted by the Bibliotheca Alexandrina in March. Intel BASEF is intended for children in grades 9–12 from Alexandria and the neighboring governorates to compete with each team. The winning projects, one team project and two individual projects, represent Egypt in the Intel International Science and Engineering Fair (Intel ISEF) that takes place in the United States.

== Renovation ==
In 2009, the Bibliotheca Alexandrina reopened its planetarium after a renovation. The renovation included a new dome projection system and a new set of shows. The renovation allowed for the Bibliotheca and the Planetarium Science Center to jointly host the 20th International Planetarium Society conference in June 2010. "Stars of the Pharaohs" is one of the shows that was displayed at the PSC; it was based on ancient Egyptian astronomy. It discusses topics such as how the Ancient Egyptians built observatories to study astronomy and what their legacy is to modern science. "New Horizons" is a show focusing on modern astronomical discoveries.

The Digistar 3 was first introduced in 2002 by the Evans & Sutherland (E&S) Company, which specializes in digital systems for planetariums. The Digistar 3 uses two projectors to display the full hemisphere of the planetarium.

== See also ==
- List of planetariums
- Bibliotheca Alexandrina
- Library of Alexandria
- International Planetarium Society
