= Dharanidhar University =

University in Odisha, India

- Type: Public
- Established: 1957; 69 years ago (as College); 2023; 3 years ago (as University)
- Affiliations: UGC, NAAC
- Chancellor: Governor of Odisha
- Vice-Chancellor: Sanjaya Kumar Patro
- Location: Keonjhar, Odisha, India; 21.661395°N 85.611261°E
- Campus: 154 Acres
- Website: dduniversity.ac.in

Dharanidhar University, formerly Dharanidhar Autonomous College, is a state public university in Kendujhar district of Odisha, India.

The college was established in 1957 as Keonjhar Science College, an intermediate science college, and was granted affiliation by Utkal University. It was initially headed by R. Venkatraman, IAS. On 12 February 2023, the college was awarded the university status.

== History ==
Funding for the main building of the college was donated by Muhammad Sirajuddin. The college was taken over by the Government of Odisha in 1962. On the opening of the college's humanities courses in 1967, it was renamed after Keonjhar College. It introduced an Hons at the B.Sc. level in 1974.

During 1983–84, the institution was renamed after the revolutionary Dharanidhar Naik.

In 1999 the college affiliated with North Odisha University, at Baripada, in the adjoining district of Mayurbhanj.

Autonomous status was conferred to the college on 24 September 2004. It was accredited B++ by the National Assessment and Accreditation Council (NAAC) on 2 February 2006. The College was granted University status on 12 February 2023.

== Facilities ==
The college is equipped with laboratories, a central library, audio-visual labs and a playground.

== Colleges ==
Its jurisdiction extends to Kendujhar district. The university affiliates 40 Colleges in Keonjhar District.
