= Association of Muslim Scholars in Iraq =

Iraqi group of religious leaders

Hayat al-Ulama al-Muslimin
- هيئة علماء المسلمين
- Formation: 14 April 2003; 23 years ago
- Founder: Abdul Sattar Abdul Jabbar; Harith al-Dari
- Type: Religious organisation
- Headquarters: Baghdad
- Region served: Iraq
- President: Muthanna al-Dari

The Association of Muslim Scholars in Iraq (Arabic: هيئة علماء المسلمين في العراق, romanized: Hayʼat al-ʿUlamāʾ al-Muslimīn fī al-ʿIrāq) is a group of religious leaders in Iraq. It was formed on the 14 April 2003, four days after the U.S.-led invasion demolished the Ba'athist regime of Saddam Hussein, by a group of scholars who aimed to represent Sunnis in Iraq.

Its members favor the Hanbali school of fiqh law over the Hanafi school, which had traditionally been dominant among Sunnis in southern Iraq. Though not a political party, the association is considered to be politically influential. It also administers a charitable fund set up for the upkeep of religious buildings.

== Membership ==
Prominent members include Harith al-Dari (former chairman), Muthanna al-Dari (chairman's son and spokesman, secretary-general as of 2018), Abdel-Salam al-Kubaisi, Abdel-Sattar Abdel-Jabbar (founder, and senior official), Dr. Muhammad Bashar al-Faithi, Abdel Hamid Al-Ani, Ahmed Abdul Ghafour al-Samarrai, Mahdi Ibrahim, Abu Bashir al-Tarousi, and Umar Raghib.

== Political stances ==
=== Views ===
The AMS did not join the newly formed government because it believed the political process to be illegitimate whilst Iraq remains under occupation. The group believes that: "True democracy is impossible under occupation.”

According to the association's spokesman in 2005 Muhammad al-Kubaysi, Iraq's problems can be attributed to "the presence of a foreign power that occupies this country and refuses even the mere scheduling of the withdrawal of its forces from Iraq." Members of the AMS met a senior US embassy official in January 2005 and asked for a timetable for US troop withdrawal. When this was refused, the group called for a boycott of the elections.

The AMS has been the group most critical of the occupation since the invasion of Iraq in 2003. Harith al-Dari, the chairman of the group, has said: "Iraq’s ordeal will not end unless the occupation ends. We must get rid of the occupation which is the cause of Iraq’s misery and pain. It acts as a cover and fuel for outsiders to meddle."

The association has been called an important force in giving the anti-occupation Sunni insurgency religious sanction in Iraq, with some of its leaders, such as Ayyash al-Kubaisi, openly endorsing the Sunni resistance as legitimate. However, they have consistently condemned all indiscriminate attacks on civilians, distinguishing between 'terrorism' and 'honorable resistance' and have negotiated for the release of Western hostages, as well as helping to arrange aid convoys to the city of Falluja when it was under siege.

When Al-Qaeda in Iraq leader Abu Musab al-Zarqawi called for "a full-scale war on Shiites," at least one member of the association, Abu Bashir al-Tarousi, objected, pointing out that "although sectarian war in Iraq may have been provoked and sparked by the Shia ... killing according to sectarian affiliation is not justified by Islamic law," and Muslims should not take "justice into their own hands." He also expressed concern that the attacks would cause the "legitimate Iraqi resistance" to lose its credibility in the eyes of the Islamic world" In 2018, the AMS reaffirmed its opposition to foreign forces in Iraq, while maintaining its denial of organizational links to al-Qaeda despite Chairman Harith al-Dari's inclusion on a terrorism list released by the Dawa Party-led government in Iraq.

The association has condemned the 2016 assault on Falluja as "an unjust aggression, a reflection of the vengeful spirit that the forces of evil harbor against this city".

== Religious stances ==
The AMS is a group of Sunni scholars. Its members favor the Hanbali school of fiqh law over the Hanafi school, which has traditionally been dominant among Sunnis in Iraq.
