= António Xavier Trindade =

Portuguese painter (1870–1935)

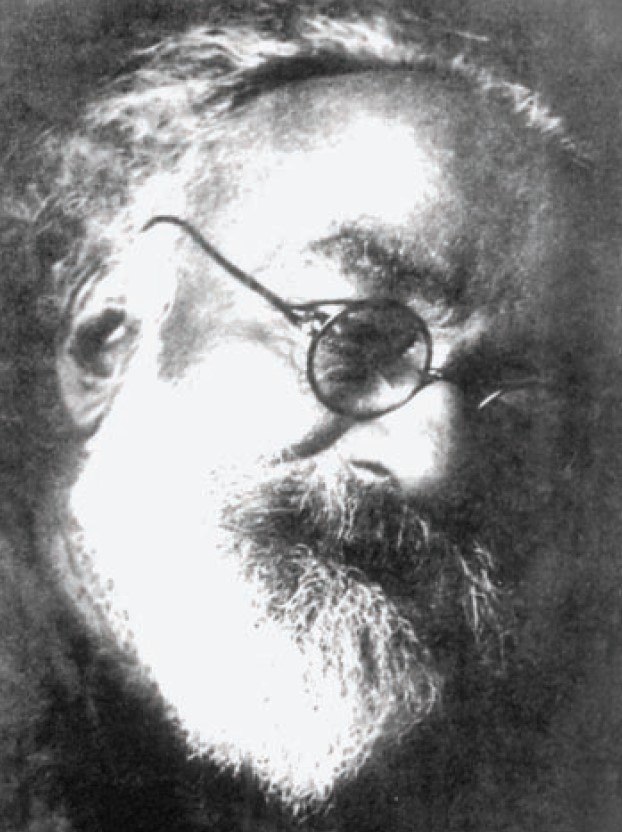
- Born: 3 July 1870; Sanguem, Goa, Portuguese India
- Died: 15 March 1935 (aged 64); Brazil
- Education: Sir J. J. School of Art
- Known for: Painting
- Children: Angela Trindade

António Xavier Trindade (3 July 1870 – 15 March 1935) was an Indian painter of the Bombay School in the early 20th century.

== Biography ==
António Xavier Trindade was born in Sanguem, Portuguese Goa in 1870 to Catholic parents. After being encouraged to pursue his artistic talent, Trindade enrolled at the Sir Jamsetjee Jeejeebhoy School of Art in Bombay, a prestigious institution dedicated to the teaching of painting, sculpture and design, which followed the traditions of European naturalism as expressed by the South Kensington system.

The work of António Xavier Trindade skilfully interweaves the cultural universes of the Indian Subcontinent and Western Europe, ensuring the painter great acclaim and the highest honours an artist could aspire to at that time. In 1892, the artist was awarded the renowned Mayo Silver Medal for artistic merit in Art.

Trindade was appointed Teacher of Drawing and Painting at the Sir J. J. School of Art in 1898 and in 1914 took over as Superintendent of the Reay Workshop of Art at the same institution, position he held till retirement in 1926.

The artist married Florentina Noronha in 1901 and moved to Dhobitalao and couple of years later to Mahim. This location proved to highly influence his work. Between 1902 and 1922 eight children were born to the couple.

Earlier in his career, as a supplement to his income at the J.J. School of Art, Trindade worked at the studio of Deen Dayal and was commissioned paintings to the nawabs of Hyderabad. In 1920, when his work started to mature, the Bombay Art Society honoured the artist with its gold medal - the highest award in India for artists at that time - for the painting Dolce Far Niente (also known as Flora or Mother Reclining), featuring his wife Florentina. In 1928 he was awarded the first Governor’s Prize for the painting New Year’s Song and two years later for Hindu Girl.

The artist’s vast body of work matured in the 1920s and early 1930s, consisting mainly of portraits, landscapes and still-lifes. Influenced by his western upbringing and European artistic trends of that period, Trindade knew how to integrate this inheritance in his paintings, either by the themes he chose or the way he approached them.

In 1933 the artist moved with his family into their new house, Casa Bianca, in Mahim. Suffering from diabetes, both his legs were amputated. Nonetheless, he continued painting with the assistance of his daughter Ângela, also an accomplished artist. In 1934 Trindade’s paintings were selected by the Regional Committee of Bombay and exhibited at the Festival of the Empire in Wembley, London.

On 16 March 1935, António Xavier Trindade died at home leaving behind an extraordinary artistic legacy.

After the artist died, his masterpieces have been lent for various exhibitions in India and abroad. Among the major solo exhibitions of the artist’s work was the 24th Maharashtra State Art Exhibition at the Jehangir Arts Gallery, Bombay in 1984, where more than 33 of his paintings from 1887 to 1935 were curated in a special Section. Nonetheless, the first comprehensive overseas exhibition of Trindade’s 20th century works was at the Georgia Museum of Art, University of Georgia, USA in 1996. In 2007, the same exhibition was presented at Fine Arts Society, Lisbon, the Soares dos Reis Museum, Porto and one year later at Ponta Delgada Cultural Centre, Azores, Portugal.

Since 2012, António Xavier Trindade’s work has been permanently exhibited at Fundação Oriente, Goa. In 2021, the same institution presented a new permanent exhibition as a celebration of the artist’s 150th birthday (2020).Selected Works from the Trindade Collection adds a considerable number of recently restored paintings to the Collection's narrative, that have never been displayed before. For the first time, Ângela Trindade’s work is also permanently exhibited, allowing the viewer to understand the creative exchange between the two artists, one that transcends their family ties.

== Works ==
Although many of Trindade’s works still remain with the family, a considerable part of his legacy was donated to Fundação Oriente by the Esther Trindade Trust in 2004. Among other objects, the Trindade Collection includes 63 works by the renowned Goan painter and 82 paintings by his daughter Ângela Trindade, also an accomplished artist.

A contemporary of Ravi Verma and M. V. Dhurandhar, Trindade’s paintings are part of collections such as National Gallery of Modern Art, New Delhi and other private collectors.

Trindade’s mastery of portrait can be illustrated by some of early works such as Self-portrait in Green (1912) or in other domestic scenes like Dolce Far Niente (1920), featuring his wife or Esther Reclining (n.d.), portraying one of his daughters. Other portraits also include paintings of people close to the artist, as in the case of Mr. Amor (1919), a Portuguese official assigned to Goa at the time, the family friend Miss Ferns (1925), the British suffragette Annie Besant (1927) and John, the Family Cook (1930). Of his commissioned portraits, Lady Meherbai Tata (1931) is also part of this collection. As a whole, these works reveal Trindade’s strong understanding of his subject’s psychological profile but also his fluency with the chiaroscuro technique.

The depth of Trindade’s perception and skill in composition have been proven a constant in his paintings, earning the artist the epithet of “Rembrandt of the East”, even though the eloquence of his colour and light-dark techniques are perhaps more reminiscent of the Spanish masters Velásquez or Goya. Examples of this are depictions of simple folk such as The Armenian Sisters (1932), traditional characters as in Forsaken (n.d.), and scenes portraying daily life and rituals such as Sanyasi (n.d.) and Preparing for Puja (1923).

Another interesting dimension to the artist’s work for its documental significance and distinct artistic approaches are depicted in works such as Nasik Scene with Bathers (1932) and Nasik Scene with Temples (1932) capture the dynamics and variety of spiritual sentiments across multiple communities and belief systems in India. AXT’s mastery of watercolour and drawing can also be found in the group of four paintings that comprise the Nasik Scenes (1931) and among newly restored works such as Woman in Pink Sari (n.d.) or Head of a Bald Man (1914).

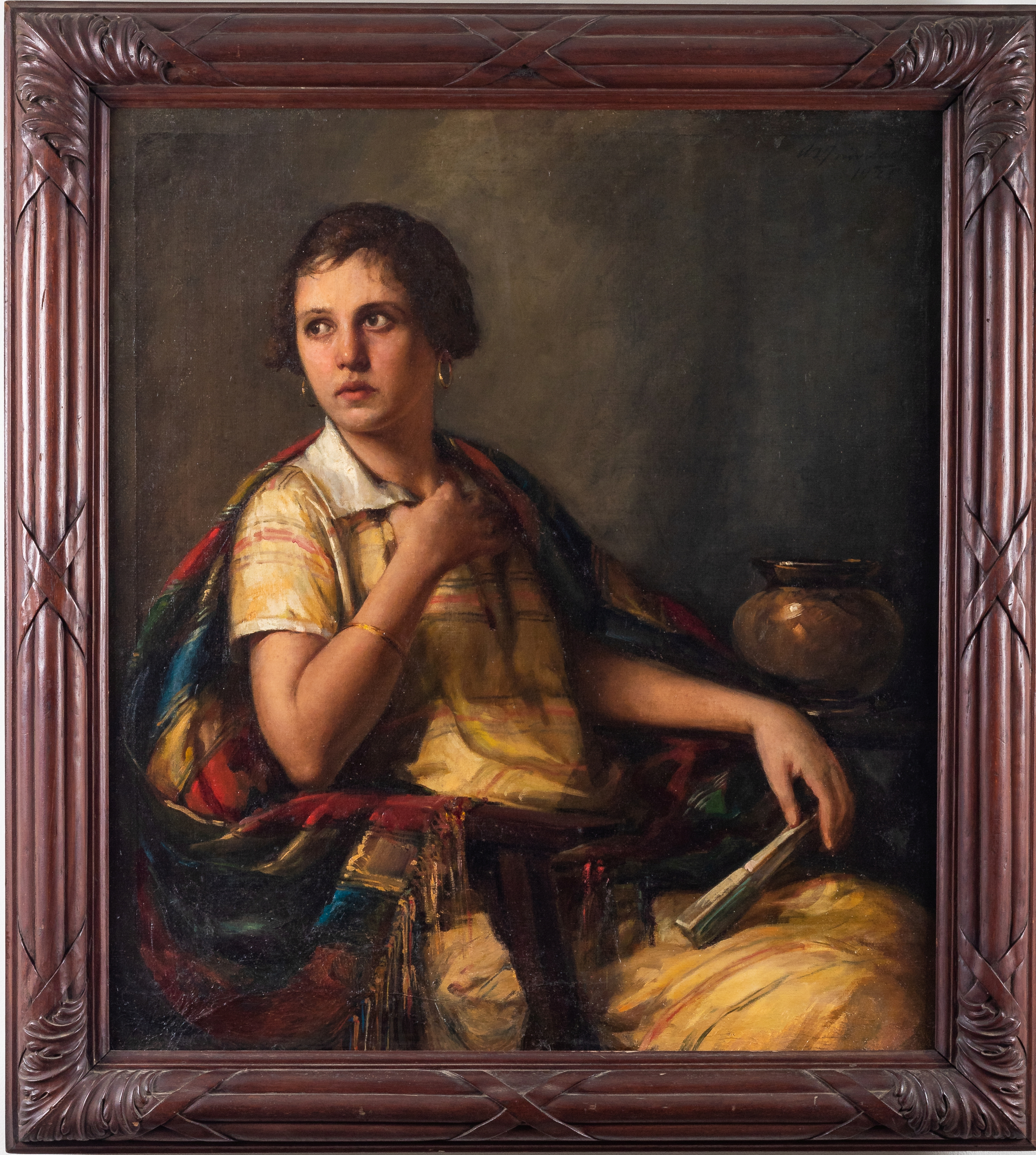
A. X. Trindade, Miss. Ferns, 1925 (C) Fundação Oriente

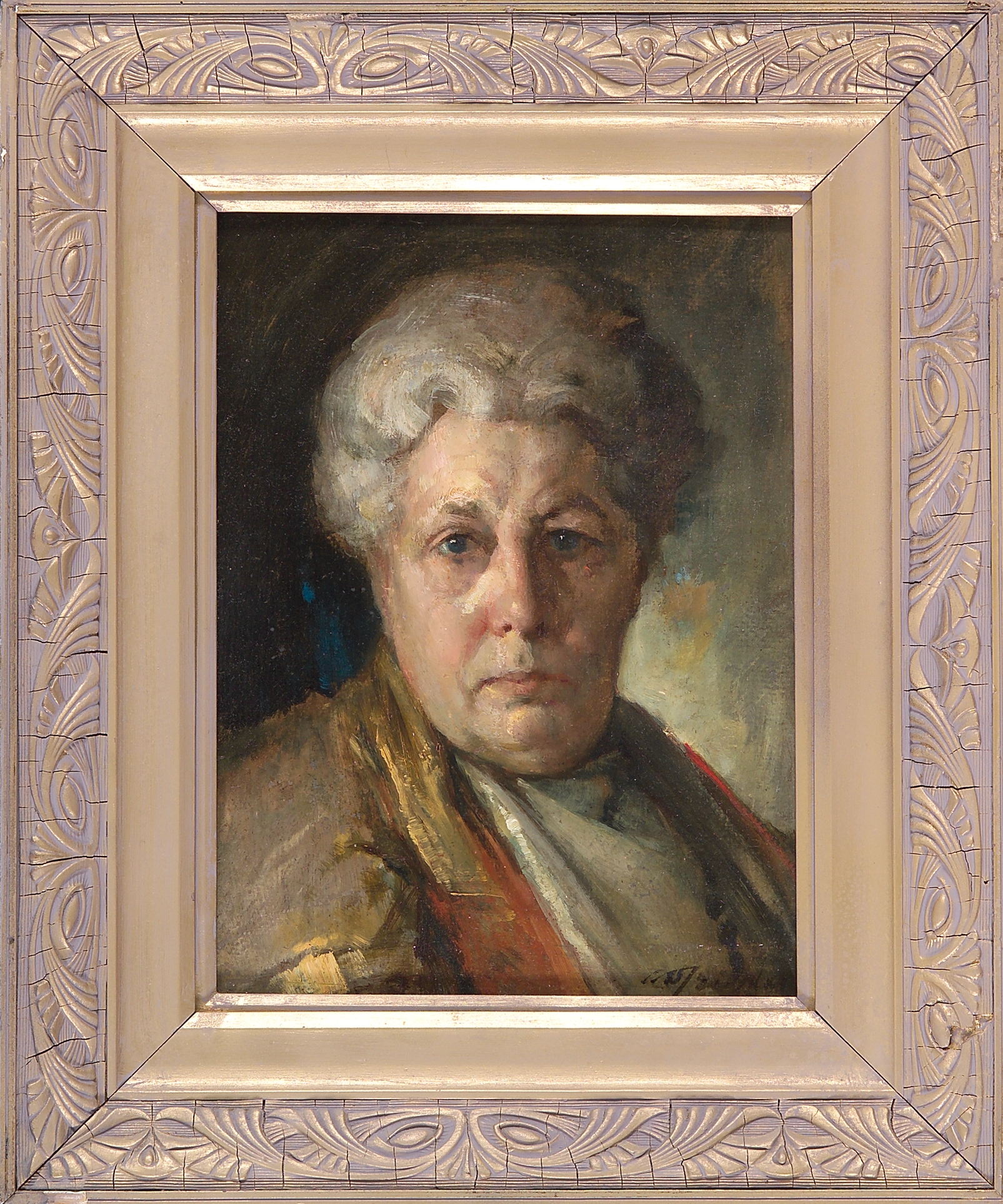
A. X. Trindade, Dr. Annie Besant, 1927 (C) Fundação Oriente

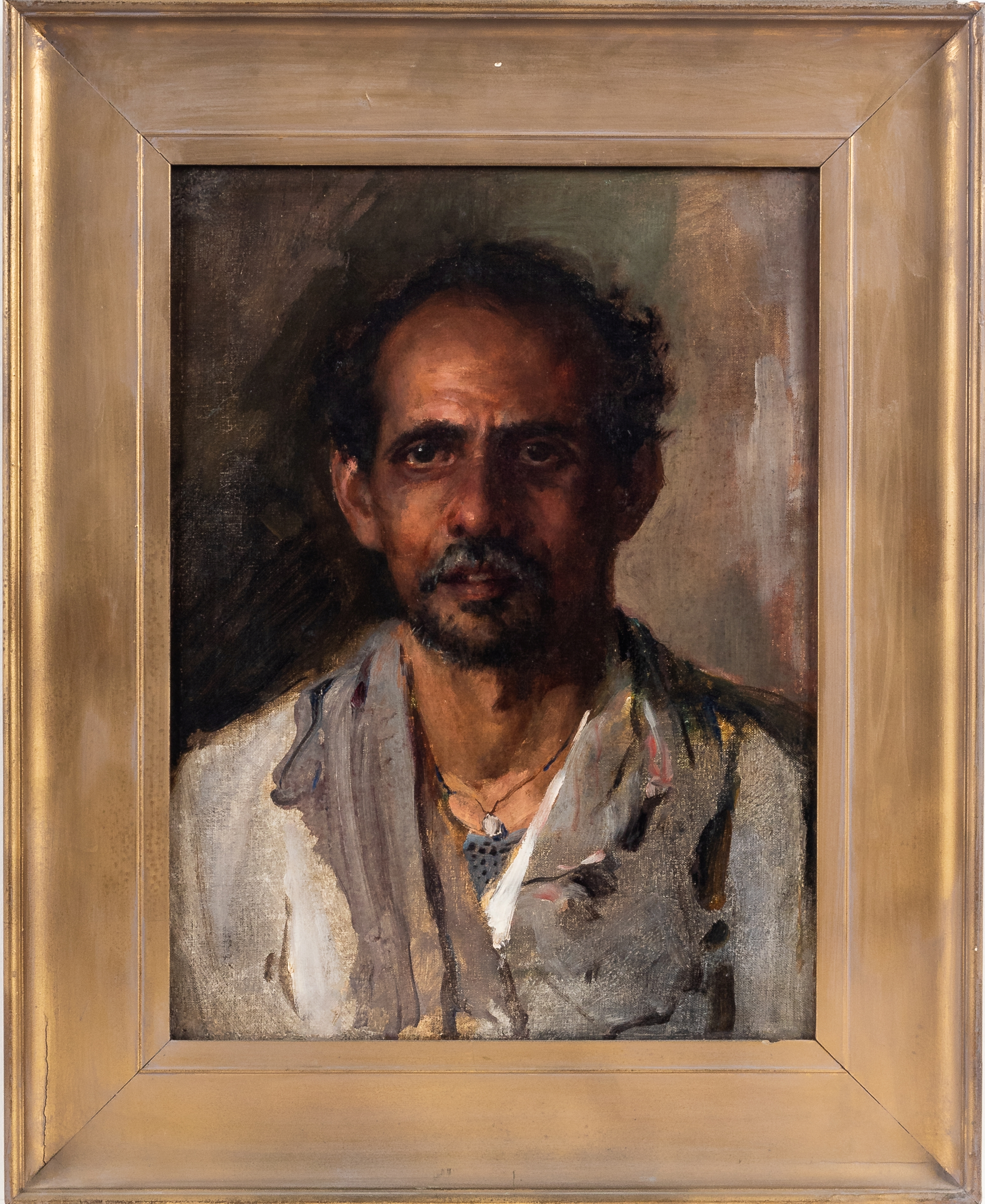
A. X. Trindade, John, the Family Cook, 1930 (C) Fundação Oriente

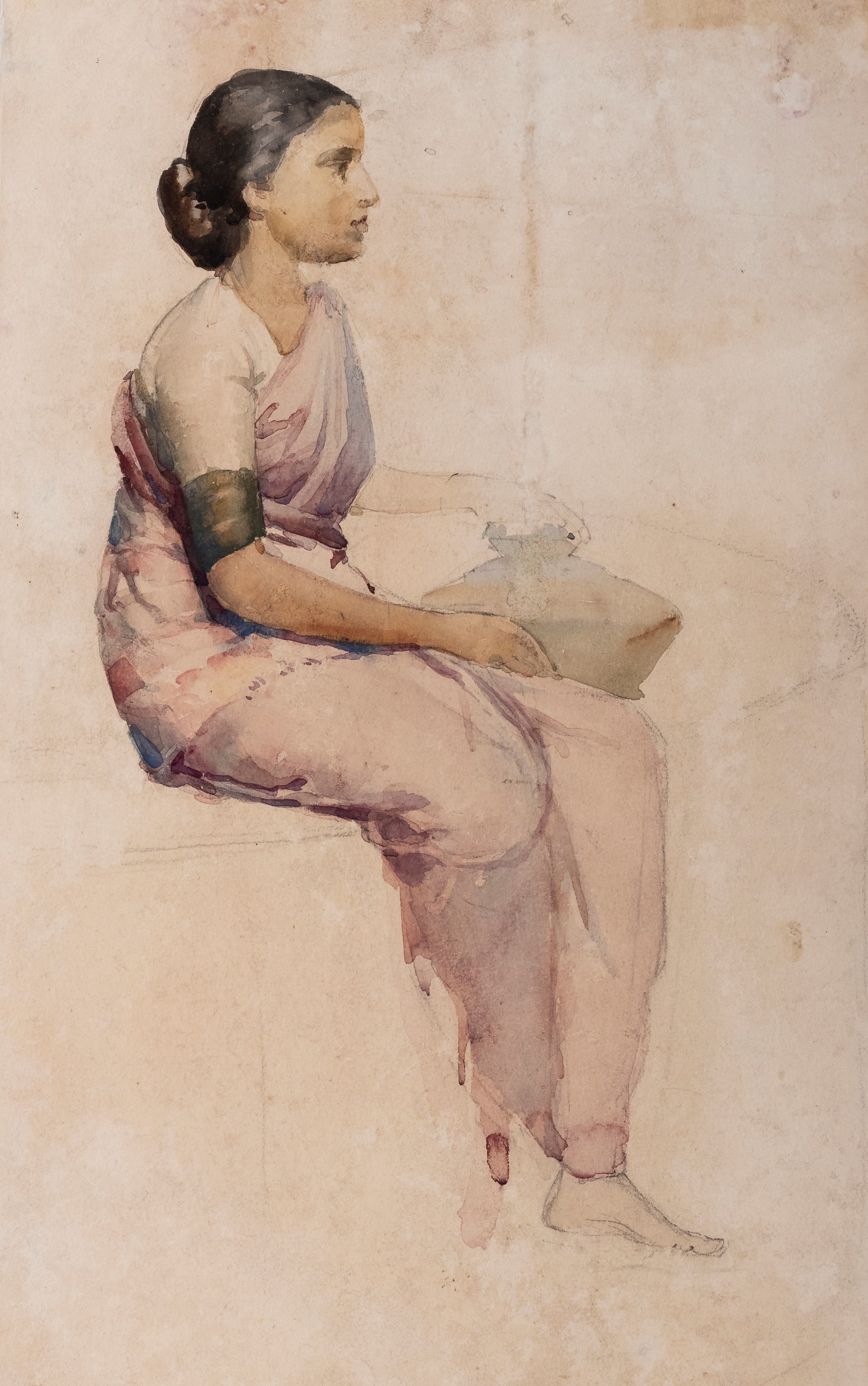
A. X. Trindade, Woman in a Pink Sari, watercolour on paper, n.d. (C) Fundação Oriente
