= ResCarta Toolkit =

- Original authors: The ResCarta Foundation, Inc.
- Developers: The ResCarta Foundation, Inc.
- Initial release: January 2004
- Stable release: 7.0.4 / 6 December 2020; 5 years ago
- Written in: Java
- Operating system: Cross-platform
- Type: Institutional repository software
- License: Apache License 2.0
- Website: www.rescarta.org

ResCarta Toolkit is an open source software package used to create open access repositories for local history and published digital content. ResCarta Toolkit focuses on the use of open standard file formats and metadata standards to create archives that are sustainable over time. It includes software for creation of digital objects, indexing of metadata and content, display tools and checksum validation.

== History ==
The first public version of the ResCarta Toolkit was released in January 2004 at the American Library Association meeting in San Diego, CA.

== Technology ==
The ResCarta Toolkit is a set of Java applications and utility programs that create and maintain digital objects with associated metadata. The applications provide tools for the creation, collection, indexing and access to standardized digital objects. Digital objects are maintained on a local file system. The metadata is stored within each digital object. The ResCarta-Web application uses JSP and the Java Servlet API. ResCarta digital objects are made available primarily via a web interface, it also creates OAI_DC output for use by OAI-PMH v2.0 servers. Metadata is stored natively in Metadata Encoding and Transmission Standard (METS). ResCarta-Web supports in line metadata using COinS, and RSS. Most recent versions of the ResCarta Toolkit also support the use of BroadCast WAV format with full text automatic audio transcription (AAT) based on CMU Sphinx for storage and access to oral histories and news casts.

== See also ==
- Digital library
- Institutional repository
- Context Objects in Spans
- Metadata Encoding and Transmission Standard (METS)
