= Dhari Junction railway station =

Railway station in Gujarat, India

General information
- Location: Dhari, Amreli district India
- Coordinates: 21°19′36″N 71°01′40″E
- Elevation: 214 m (702.1 ft)
- System: Indian Railway Station
- Owner: Ministry of Railways, Indian Railways
- Operator: Western Railway
- Line: Amreli- Veraval line
- Platforms: 1
- Tracks: 1

Construction
- Parking: No
- Cycle facilities: No

Other information
- Status: Functioning
- Station code: DARI
- Zone(s): Western Railway
- Division(s): Bhavnagar
Location
- Location within India Location within Gujarat

Dhari Junction railway station is a railway station serving in Amreli district of Gujarat State of India. It is under Bhavnagar railway division of Western Railway Zone of Indian Railways. Passenger trains halt here.
