= International School of Information Science =

School of Information science in Egypt

The International School of Information Science (ISIS) in Alexandria, Egypt was founded to initiate, develop, carry out, and promote research and development of activities and projects related to building a universal digital library. ISIS was also created in order to maximize creativity and foster innovations within the Bibliotheca Alexandrina. The Institute develops IT projects that will ultimately contribute to the knowledge capacity of Egypt and the world.
