= Science Supercourse =

Science Supercourse is a free online accessible educational resource currently encompassing more than 165,000 downloadable PowerPoint lectures covering four main areas of science; Public Health, Computer Engineering, Environment and Agriculture. It represents an extension to "Supercourse" initiative which started out at the University of Pittsburgh by scientist Ronald LaPorte in the 80's. It is mirrored at the Library of Alexandria, and networks over 56,000 scientists in 174 countries. Being a useful tool for at least one million students from around the globe, Supercourse has been a well-established starting point which triggered the emergence of the new Science Supercourse in 2008 with a wider scope in terms of content and functionalities.

== Functionalities offered by Science Supercourse ==
The system offers an interactive platform for academic students and educators worldwide to share lectures in an interactive context which allows for maximizing the user's benefit through the available personalized functionalities. Lectures on Science Supercourse are searchable, where users may search globally throughout the whole repository down to the level of a single lecture. That is in addition to the possibility of carrying out advanced search for more specific results.

Users have their own space on Science Supercours to handle the material of their interest. This includes creating their own library of favorite lectures, bookmarking slides to come back to, compiling slides from different lectures to download for personal use, receive email notifications of recent updates, etc.

== How Lectures on Science Supercourse are compiled and classified ==
The International School of Information Science (ISIS)- a research center affiliated with the Library of Alexandria - has been compiling lectures on the Science Supercourse from different sources. The main bulk of lectures have been crawled from the Internet, where crawling queries have been created on Google, compiling the already existing lectures on the web which pertain to credible resources (such as .edu domains). The obtained lectures are classified based on standard classifications:

- Library of Congress (LoC) standard classification for Public Health lectures
- Association for Computing Machinery (ACM) standard classification has been used for Computer Engineering lectures
- National Agriculture Library (NAL) standard classification for Agriculture and Environment lectures

Lectures may also be uploaded directly onto the Science Supercourse system by professors and experts. All obtained lectures, either through crawling or manual uploading, are submitted to a Lecture Processing Workflow where the original data on the slides is converted into images to prevent any alteration, thus allowing users to use the slides as is, maintaining the original input and intellectual property of the author.

However, the addition of lectures on Science Supercourse is based on opt-out policy, where upon notification, lectures are immediately removed from the system as per the request of their authors.

== Legacy Lectures on Science Supercourse ==
The repository also contains a special section for legacy lectures that contain a collection of compiled valuable presentations. This section includes:

- Nobel Lectures, which are authored by Nobel Laureates themselves or tackle their work.
- Golden Lectures, which are authored by eminent lecturers
- Just-in-time lectures, which are created at times of disasters or natural catastrophes (e.g. earthquakes, tsunamis, the nuclear crisis in Japan, etc.)aiming to raise the awareness of the public to issues of the hour. These materials are often produced in nearly real-time and translated into multiple languages for use by responders (and often, victims) to understand what has happened and what responses may be needed.

That is in addition to lectures contributed by members of eminent institutions, such as the members of the National Academy of Sciences, members of the National Institutes of Health and those of the Institute of Medicine.

== Community Participation ==
Users are the main driving force of the Science Supercourse. Therefore, the system has been built on Web 2.0 technologies, aiming to engage community members at different levels. For example, by just viewing and rating lectures, this allows for automatic display of the best ones on top. The system allows registered users to communicate through submitting comment or aid in filtering the lectures by submitting negative reports for certain lectures that may contain ineligible content to be removed from the system. On another level, the Science Supercourse is a meeting point where experts share their knowledge and their best lectures by uploading them onto the system to be shared with others worldwide. As such, networking is the main factor of success of the Science Supercourse, where each area will have an authorized network of individuals in the field designated to stimulate the contribution of high-quality lectures and to work on reviewing the relevancy and eligibility of the content on the system.

== Management of Science Supercourse Content ==
In order to achieve the goal of rendering the Science Supercourse a credible source of material for teachers and educators worldwide, the Library of Alexandria has developed a backend application which is meant to be a tool for controlling the content on the Science Supercourse system. The application contains a set of functionalities and privileges involving multiple users on different levels whose roles vary from editing authors' and lectures' metadata in addition to reviewing comments and negative reports, to reviewing lecture content (accepting or rejecting lectures)and editing lectures' classification.

Back-end users may handle one or more of the above-mentioned functionalities which could be requested in an Administration Request, which is granted with reference to the user’s profile and level of expertise.
