= Dhari Ali al-Fayadh =

Iraqi politician

Sheikh Dhari Ali al-Fayadh (c. 1918 – June 28, 2005) was the oldest Iraqi Member of Parliament until his assassination in 2005. He was believed to have been 87.

Fayadh had been the leader of a prominent tribe from southern Iraq, the Albu Amer, and was first elected to an Iraqi legislature by the monarchy before it was toppled in 1958. He was elected to the Iraqi Parliament in January 2005 as part of the majority-holding Shiite slate and he served as assembly speaker at one of the assembly's opening sessions.

Fayadh was killed, along with his son and two bodyguards, when a car bomb was rammed into his motorcade. Abu Musab al-Zarqawi's organization claimed the killing.
