= Dhundhara =

Dhundara Dhundhada
- Village
- Location in Rajasthan, India Dhundara (India)
- Coordinates: 26.71°N 72.92°E
- Country: India
- State: Rajasthan
- District: Jodhpur district

Government
  - Type: Democratic
- Elevation: 182 m (597 ft)

Population (2011)
  - Total: 6,019
  - Rank: 1. 5

Languages
  - Official: Hindi, Marwadi
- Time zone: UTC+5:30 (IST)
- Nearest city: Samdari, Jodhpur

Dhundhara is a village located in the Jodhpur district of Rajasthan in northern India. It is 25 km (16 mi) from sub-district headquarters Luni, Rajasthan, and 65 km (40 mi) from district headquarters Jodhpur. According to the 2011 Census of India, Dhundhara is a Gram Panchayat. It is at the lowest level of Panchayat Raj institutions (PRIs).

== Demographics ==
According to the 2011 census, the population is 6019, with 1026 households. Women account for 47.9% of the population. The overall literacy rate is 56.4%, with literacy among women at 20.6%.

== Transport ==
The nearest access to rail transport from the region is from the Dundara and Miyan Ka Bara Halt railway stations. Until 2007, these were connected via a break of gauge junction station to the broad gauge lines going to Barmer and Jodhpur.
