= Dhar district, Yemen =

Coordinates: 15.5033°N 47.6056°E

Dhar District (Yemen) مديرية دهر
- District
- Interactive map of Dhar District (Yemen)
- Country: Yemen
- Governorate: Shabwah

Population (2003)
  - Total: 9,927
- Time zone: UTC+3 (Yemen Standard Time)

Dhar District (Yemen) (Arabic: مديرية دهر) is a district of the Shabwah Governorate in Yemen. As of 2003, the district had a population of 9,927 people.
