= Angela Trindade =

American painter (1909–1980)

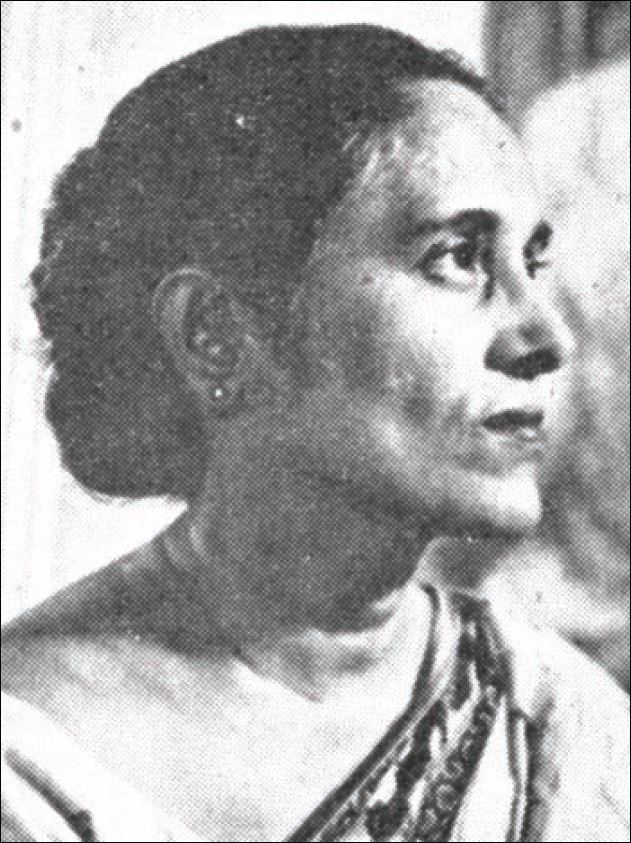
- Born: August 10, 1909; Bombay, British India
- Died: March 20, 1980 (aged 70); São Paulo, Brazil
- Citizenship: British Raj (until 1947); India (1949–1978); United States (from 1978)
- Education: Sir J. J. School of Art
- Known for: Painting
- Father: António Xavier Trindade

Angela Trindade (August 10, 1909 – March 20, 1980) was an American painter famous for her Western-style portraits and Christian paintings in the Indian style. As a versatile artist, she also developed her own style called "Trindadism", in which she incorporated the symbolic dimensions of the triangle and the trinity. This unique approach to art allowed Trindade to establish her individuality as an artist.

== Early life and education ==
Ângela Trindade was born in Bombay in 1909, to Goan parents Florentina Noronha and the renowned artist António Xavier Trindade.

She belonged to the generation which witnessed the decline of colonial powers in the Indian subcontinent and the formation post-independence India.

Like her father, Trindade enrolled in the Sir J.J. School of Art in Bombay and, during this period, became the first woman painter to be granted a fellowship by the same institution. Her training included the study of both traditional Indian aesthetics and Western Academic style of oil painting. The artist's western upbringing, liberal education and creative home environment made it easier for her to become one of the first women in India to take up painting as a profession.

== Career ==
Trindade's early art was deeply influenced by her father's aesthetics and her western education as is evident in Punjabi with Mandolin (1949)or Town Scene (1948).

A versatile artist, Trindade did not shy away from experimenting in both Western and Indian styles. Accordingly, she became famous for both her Western style portraits and paintings of Christian themes in Indian style, as Our lady of Conception, 1956. For the latter she was awarded the Papal decoration Pro-Ecclesia et Pontifice for her contribution to the world of art and culture in 1955. However, it was the creation of Trindadism, a style all her own, that set her apart. Using the cultural and spiritual symbolic dimensions of the triangle in her work, Ângela demonstrated an individual approach to art which highlighted her creativity and individuality as an artist. As extraordinary example of Angela's own style is Shakuntala & the Deer, 1960.

In 1936 Trindade was awarded the gold medal at the first All India Women Artists Exhibition and in 1947 had her first solo exhibition in India at the Chetana Gallery, Bombay.

While fond of portraiture, Trindade explored a variety of other genres in her paintings such as landscapes, still lifes as well as non-representational forms. In 1949, the artist had the opportunity to present her first solo exhibition abroad at the Fine Art Club, Washington D.C., United States of America.

On one of her many visits to the United States of America in the 1960s, where she relocated permanently in 1963, Ângela started to explore Tantric Art and Abstract Expressionism, as she believed that only through abstraction could she finally marry Eastern and Western influences in her art.

== Death and legacy ==
Trindade died unexpectedly during a family visit to São Paulo, Brazil in 1980. Since then, her work has been exhibited several times. The first solo show of her religious work was shown at in 2014 Fundação Oriente, Goa. Her selected works, both religious and non-religious, were also exhibited in 2016 in Goa and are now permanently exhibited, alongside her father's paintings under the title Selected Works from the Trindade Collection at Fundação Oriente Delegation in India since January 2021.

A versatile artist, Angela Trindade's legacy is a representation of the diverse influences and artistic tendencies found in the 20th century Indian arts.
