= Jamal al-Dhari =

Leader of the al-Zoba tribe in Iraq

Jamal al-Dhari جمال الضاري
- Born: 1965 (age 59–60); Abu Ghraib district, Iraqi Republic
- Occupation(s): President of "Iraqi National Project" and former President of the "Peace Ambassadors for Iraq" and a senior Iraqi tribal leader.
- Father: Abd al-Wahhab al-Dhari
- Relatives: Harith al-Dhari (great uncle)

Sheikh Jamal Abd al-Wahhab Khamis al-Dhari is one of the leaders of the al-Zoba tribe in Iraq, and is the nephew of the Islamic scholar and religious leader Sheikh Harith al-Dhari.

Jamal al-Dhari was born in the Abu Ghraib district of Iraq on July 16, 1965. He grew up within the al-Zoba tribe and in the 1970s he attended the Hafsa School.

In 1984 he was conscripted into the Iraqi Army to fight in the Iran-Iraq War. During his time on the frontline, he fought alongside both Sunni and Shia officers and friends, in the Iraqi Republican Guard.

In 1987, Jamal together with his fellows in the army were accused to be against the Ba’athist regime, and 1988 were sentenced in a military court to serve time in jail. In 1990, they were released when Saddam Hussein decided to invade Kuwait, as he badly needed Sunni tribes to support his family and regime.

Following the 2003 invasion of Iraq by coalition forces, he was a strong proponent of Iraqi nationalism and self-rule. In 2005, he and his family fought against al-Qaeda’s occupation of Iraqi territory and consequentially lost 70 members of his family in the struggle.

In 2014, he helped establish the nonprofit think tank "Peace Ambassadors for Iraq", to explain to Western audiences the present situation in Iraq, how to fully eliminate ISIS/Daesh and other terrorist forces from Iraq, and to build international support for an all-inclusive Iraq.

On 28 and 29 May 2016, Sheikh Jamal al-Dhari organized through the NGO think tank «Peace Ambassadors For Iraq» a «Conference on Peace and Reconciliation» in the lounges of the Hotel Georges V in PARIS 8e. On 30 May 2016, at the end of this conference, Sheikh Jamal al-Dhari created in PARIS, with an Iraqi national team, the NGO «Iraqi National Project» («the Iraqi National Project»), of which he is the President. On 02/05/2018, he creates the «Iraqi National Project» office of Paris/ Europe in PARIS in order to seek new international support for his political project and in particular for France with whom he has established cordial relations with the authorities in place since 2017.

Heavily invested in Iraq, he frequently met the highest political, tribal and civilian figures in his country and foreign countries. Presently, Jamal al-Dhari is working for a renewal in Iraq by forging a non-sectarian and inclusive settlement for all Iraqis.

Today, Sheikh Jamal Al Dhari, a senior Iraqi dignitary, is still the President of «the Iraqi National Project», working for the birth of an Iraqi renewal movement based on an inclusive and non-sectarian, non-sectarian global settlement, with the main objective of bringing together all the Iraqi communities.
