= Mukhtar Dar =

Pakistani-born artist and activist

Mukhtar Dar is a Pakistani-born photographer, painter, filmmaker and activist.

== Biography ==
He became a founding member of the Sheffield Asian Youth Movement in the 1980s in England, and later joined the Birmingham Asian Youth Movement. Dar has served as Director of Arts at the Drum, an intercultural arts centre in Birmingham, and around 2008 served as Director of Arts of the Birmingham-based agency Sampad Arts.

The Birmingham Museum and Art Gallery, which in 2022 displayed a number of photographs and film clips by Dar in a pop-up exhibition about the history of the United Kingdom's Asian and African Caribbean communities' struggles with racism, dubbed Dar "the unofficial artist of the largest grassroots movement in the history of the UK's South Asian communities."
