= Dharanidhar Naik =

Indian tribal leader (1864–1914)

- Born: May 5, 1864; Kusumita keonjhar, Odisha
- Died: 1914 (aged 49–50); Ali, Cuttack

Dharanidhar Naik (May 5, 1864 – 1914) was a tribal leader of Keonjhar who fought battle against Dhanurjay Bhanja during British rule in Odisha.

== Early life ==
He was high school educated. He received surveyor's training at Cuttack Survey School. He worked for King of Keonjhar as a state surveyor.

== Rebellion ==
=== Keonjhar princely state ===
Keonjhar was one of the Indian princely states. It was inhabited mostly by tribal people. The main tribes were Kols, Bhuyan and the Juangs. The Bhuyans and Kols were scattered over a large area and were found in the tributary mahals of Keonjhar, Mayurbhanj, Gangpur Bona, Bamra, Ranpur, Boudh, Kalahandi, Pallahara, Nilgiri and Dhenkanal.

The Juangs were the wildest and the most primitive tribe. As per the census of 1901, their population was about 11,159. They were mainly found in Keonjhar, Dhenkanal. In comparison with the Bhuyans, they were a small tribe, although they possessed similar social and religious habits and customs.

=== Rebellion ===
The king of Keonjhar state Dhanurjaya Bhanja's policies were very oppressive for his subjects. Policies such as forced labour (Bethi), Law on grain sales that forced farmers to sell grains to the state at low rates were particularly oppressive. This led to an uprising in Keonjhar in 1891 in which the Kol, Bhuyan and the Juang the actively participated. Dharanidhar was leader of this uprising. This rising continued for about three years from 1891 to 1893. After some initial successes where the rebels looted grain store of the state, looted the armory and captured the dewan of the state Fakirmohan Senapati. The king fled to Cuttack. The British sent forces and ultimately crushed the rebellion. He was imprisoned in cuttack jail till 1897. After his release he built a hermitage at Ali, and spent rest of his life there.
