= Harith al‑Dari =

Iraqi Sunni Arab cleric

Shaykh Harith al-Dari
- حارث الضاري
- Born: 1941; Baghdad, Kingdom of Iraq (present-day Iraq)
- Died: 12 March 2015 (aged 74); Istanbul, Turkey
- Occupations: Cleric; Chairman of the Association of Muslim Scholars
- Children: Muthanna al-Dari
- Relatives: Dari ibn Zahir (grandfather); Khamis ibn Dari (uncle); Abd al-Wahhab ibn Khamis (cousin)

Harith ibn Sulayman al-Dari (Note: Arabic: حارث بن سليمان الضاري) (1941 – 12 March 2015) was an Iraqi Islamic scholar and politician who served as the chairman of the Association of Muslim Scholars, a prominent Sunni Islamist organization, from 2003 until his death in 2015.

Al-Dari was also a leader of the Zoba' tribe. An outspoken critic of the American invasion of Iraq, he became known as "the Spiritual Leader of the Iraqi Resistance" (Insurgency). His father and grandfather assassinated Royal Army Colonel Gerard Leachman and played a part in the 1920 revolt against British imperial rule; which was the fiercest in the Shia south, and was a seminal moment of unity between Iraq's Sunnis, Shias, and Kurds that forced the British to allow a form of self-rule.

== Education ==
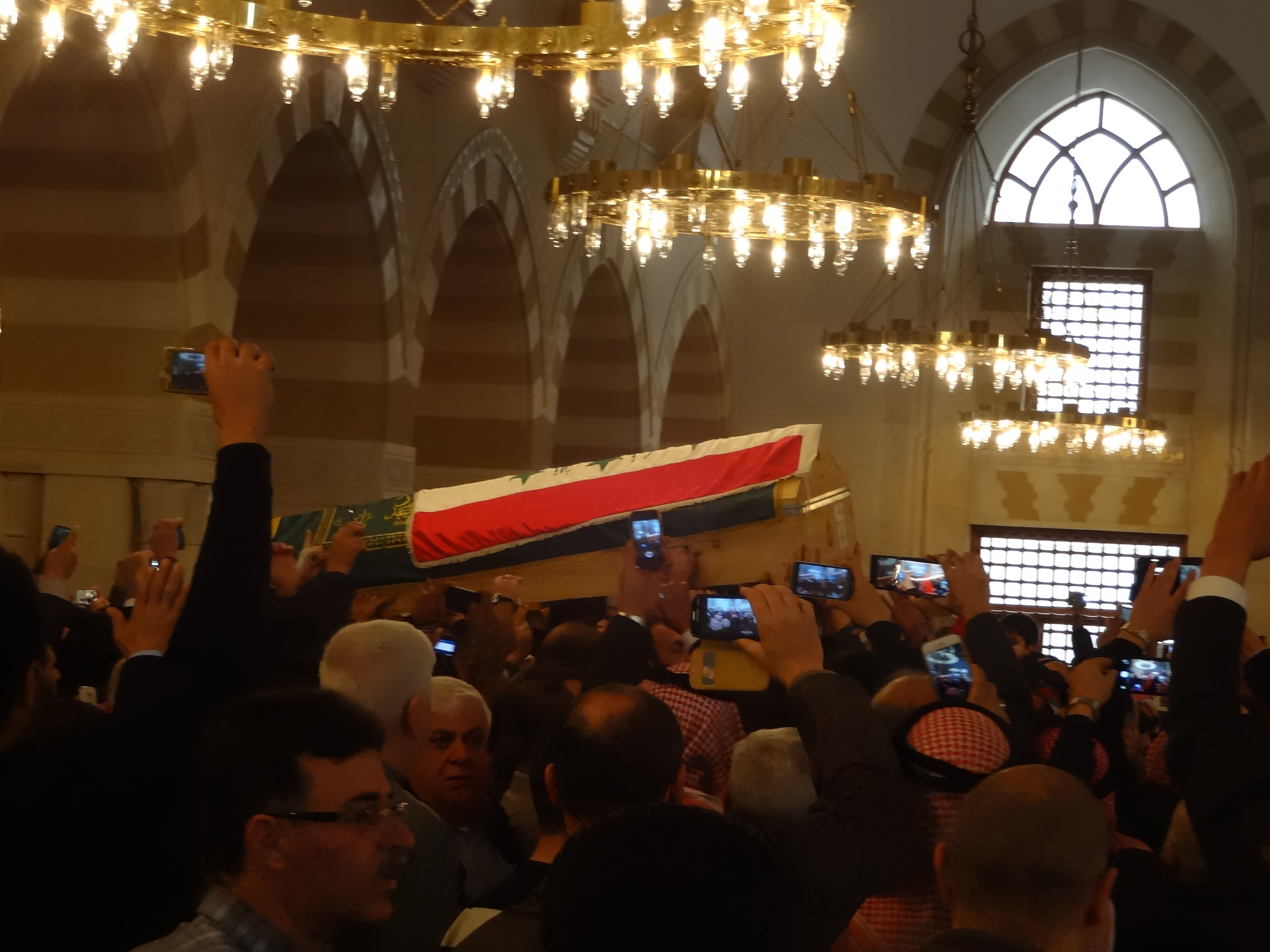
Dari's funeral at the King Hussein Bin Talal Mosque in Amman

Harith al-Dari was educated at Al-Azhar University in Cairo. He later worked in the Islamic Law department of Baghdad University.

== Iraqi politics ==
Al-Dari has been an outspoken critic of the foreign military presence in Iraq and has said that he approves of the Sunni armed resistance in the absence of a timetable for the withdrawal of Coalition troops. This stance has won him support among Sunni Arabs and respect among the rebels.

In May 2007 Al-Dari did an interview with Time, taking a stand in opposition to Al-Qaeda in Iraq, but also in opposition to the American occupation and the Maliki government. In July 2007 Al-Dari did an interview with Al Jazeera Live channel, which stated that Al-Qaeda in Iraq killed 50 members of his family.

His nephew Jamal al-Dari currently leads the Iraqi National Project, a nationalist party that won a deputy in the 2021 parliamentary elections.

== Arrest warrant ==
On November 16, 2006 Iraq's interior minister Jawad al-Bolani announced that an arrest warrant had been issued from the state's judicial system for Al-Dari, who then lived between Cairo and Amman, on charges of inciting sectarian violence. "The government's policy is that anyone who tries to spread division and strife among the Iraq people will be chased by our security agencies."

On September 16, 2008, the U.S. Treasury Department sanctioned Harith al-Dari for "threatening the peace and stability of Iraq and the Government of Iraq by ordering and directing attacks against civilians and Iraqi and Coalition Forces." In his speech on July 2, 2006, Osama bin Laden praised al-Dari.

Al-Dari moved to Jordan in 2007, and died in Istanbul, Turkey on 12 March 2015 after years of struggle with terminal illness.
