= M. V. Dhurandhar =

Indian painter (1867–1944)

Rao Bahadur M. V. Dhurandhar FRSA
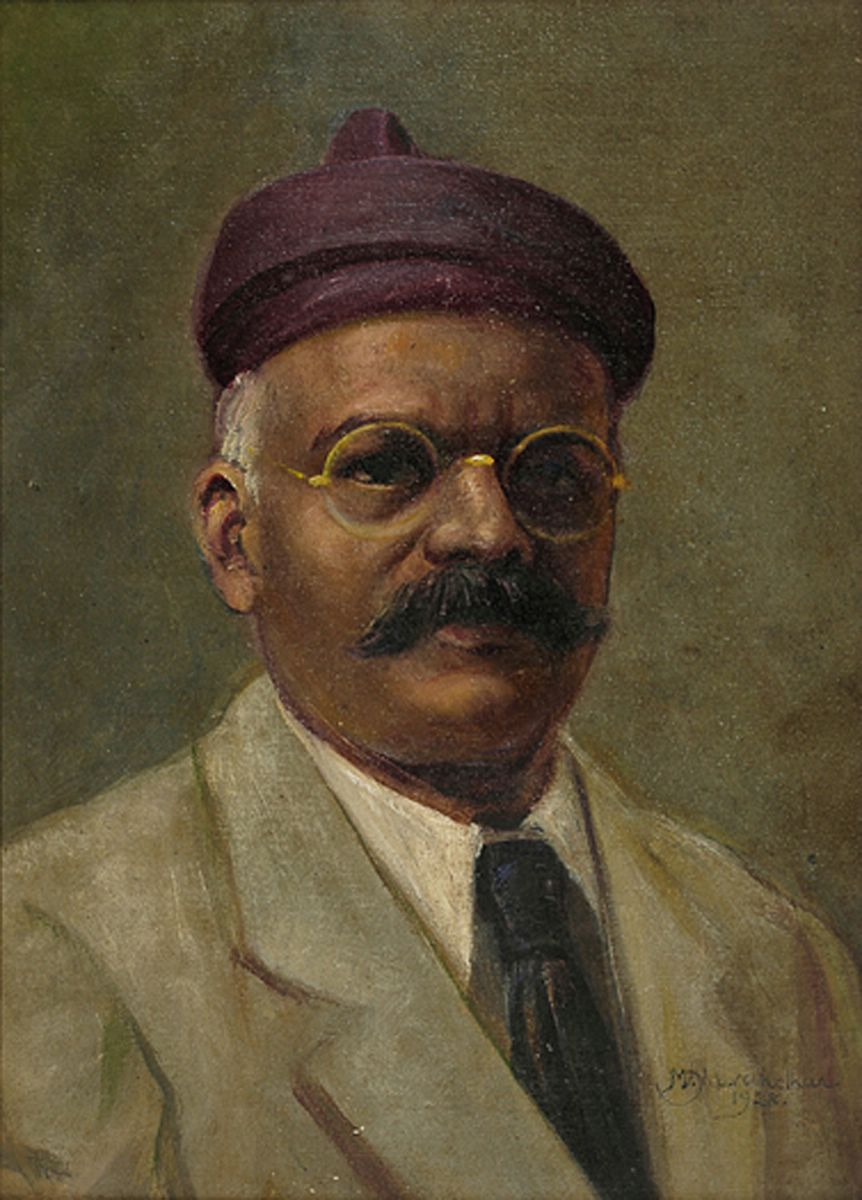
- Self-portrait, c. 1928
- Born: 18 March 1867; Kolhapur, Kolhapur State, British India (present-day Maharashtra, India)
- Died: 1 June 1944 (aged 77); Bombay, Bombay Presidency, British India (present-day Mumbai, Maharashtra, India)
- Education: Sir J. J. School of Art, Mumbai
- Notable work: Shivaji Maharaj and Baji Prabhu at Pawan Khind; Radha-Krishna; Sheshashayi-Laxminarayan
- Children: Ambika Dhurandhar
- Awards: Rao Bahadur; Fellow of the Royal Society of Arts

Rao Bahadur Mahadev Vishwanath Dhurandhar FRSA (18 March 1867 – 1 June 1944) was an Indian painter and postcard artist from the British colonial era. Among his most popular paintings are his illustrations of common colonial-era women.

== Early life ==
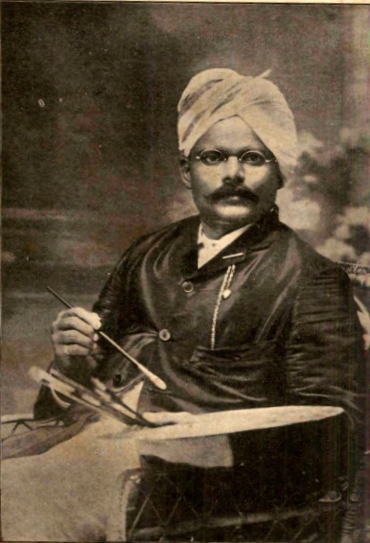

Dhurandhar was born in a Pathare Prabhu family at Kolhapur, Maharashtra. After schooling at Rajaram High School in Kolhapur, he was accepted into J.J. School of Art, Bombay in 1890. There he was student of the artist John Griffiths. As a student he won many medals for his work. He graduated in 1895.

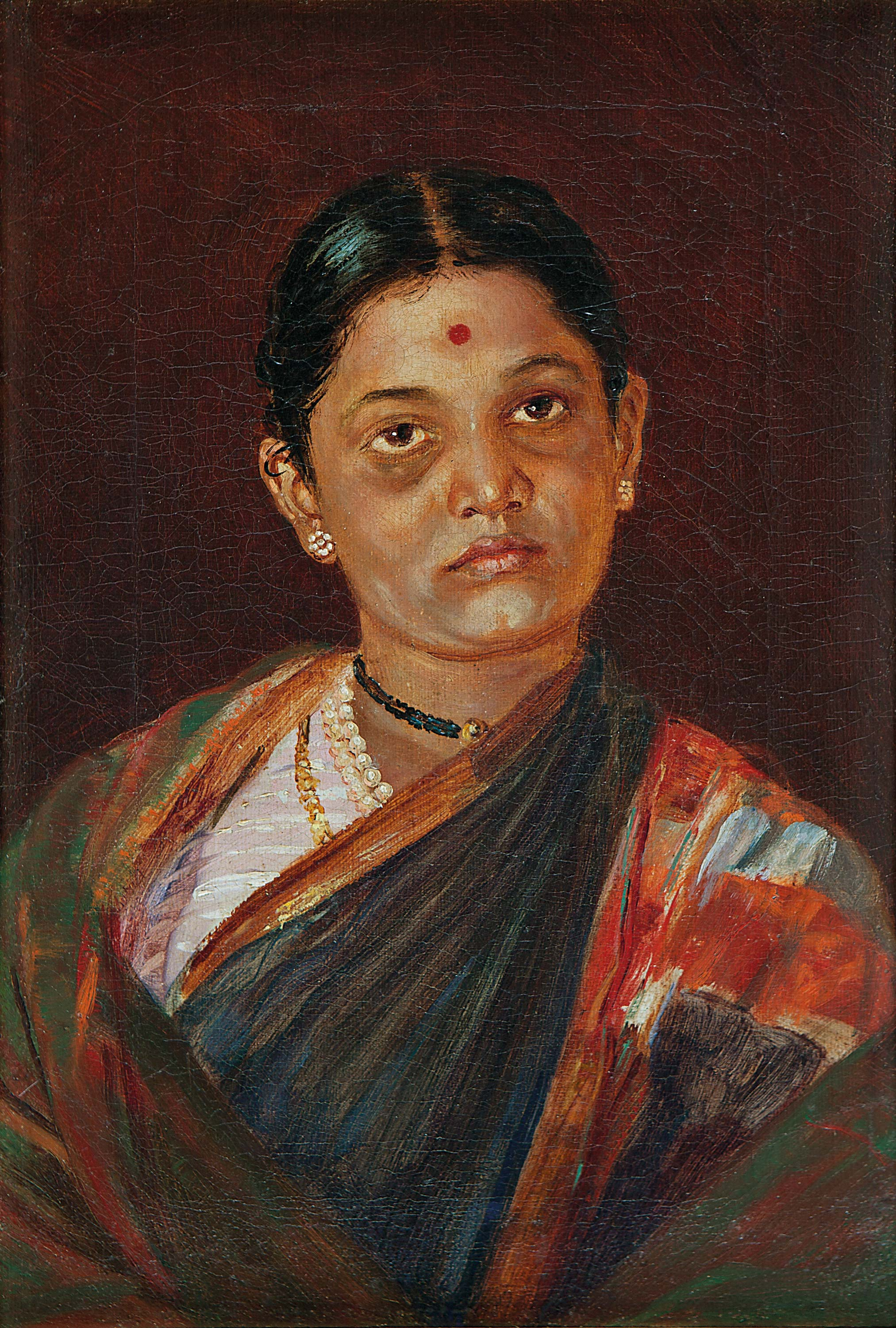
MV Dhurandhar, Portrait of the Artist’s Wife

== Career ==
After graduating from J. J. School of Art, Dhurandhar was offered a position at the same school in 1896 where he spent the rest of his career. In 1910, he was appointed as the Head Master. He was appointed Inspector of Drawing and Craft in 1918 and served in that position until 1931. He was the Vice-Principal for two years before retiring. In the year 1938, Dhurandhar was elected as the Fellow of the Royal Society of Arts.

=== Style and works ===
His popular works include documenting the city of Bombay and its people, as well as painting scenes from Hindu mythology and Omar Khayyam series. A prolific artist, Dhurandhar is said to have made some thousands of paintings and illustrations, including some that were turned into lithographic prints, such as his illustrations for the book Women of India by Otto Rothfield (1920). Dhurandhar also designed postcards, provided the illustrations for S. M. Edwardes, By-Ways of Bombay (1912) and C. A. Kincaid's Deccan Nursery Tales, besides drawing cartoons for the Gujarati periodicals Aram and Bhoot. He also made religious illustrations published by the Ravi Varma Press. He wrote an autobiography in Marathi about his years at the J.J. School. In 1926, he was commissioned by the ruler of Aundh State, Maharaja Bhawanrao Pantpratinidhi to make paintings on the life of Shivaji.

After he retired from Sir J.J School of Art in 1913, he continued painting and wrote his memoirs about his years at the art School. The book was published in 1940, titled, Kalamandiratil Ekkechalis Varshe (Forty-one years in the Temple of Art). It has become an authentic documentation on the history of Art of that period.

== Gallery ==
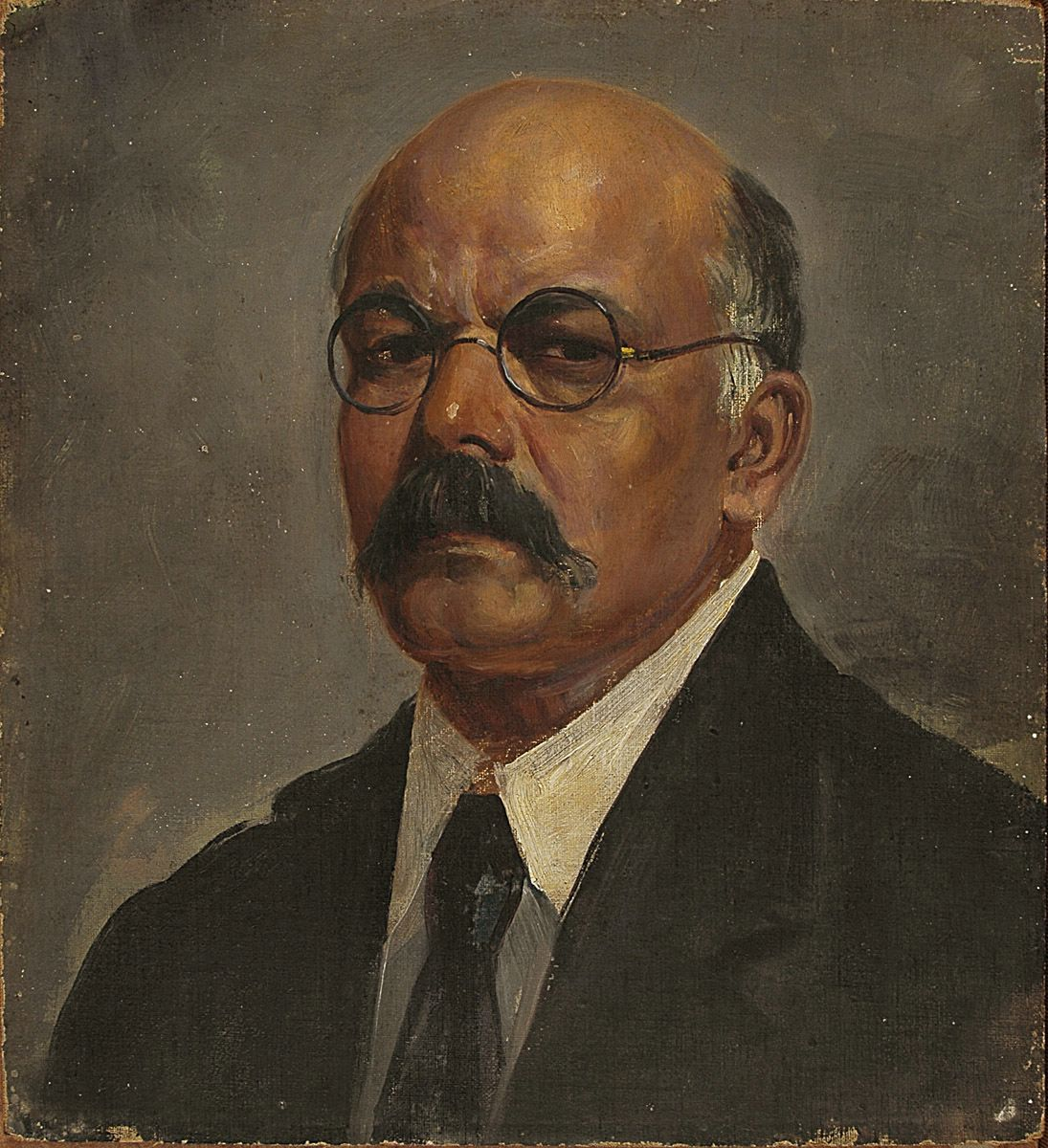
Self Portrait of Painter

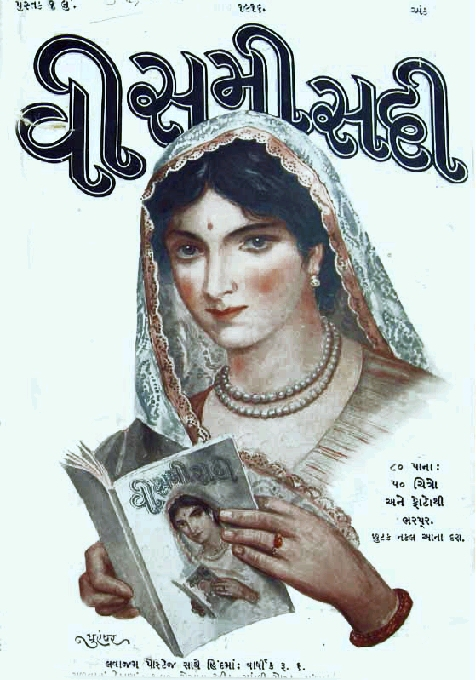
Cover art of 1916 issue of Gujarati magazine

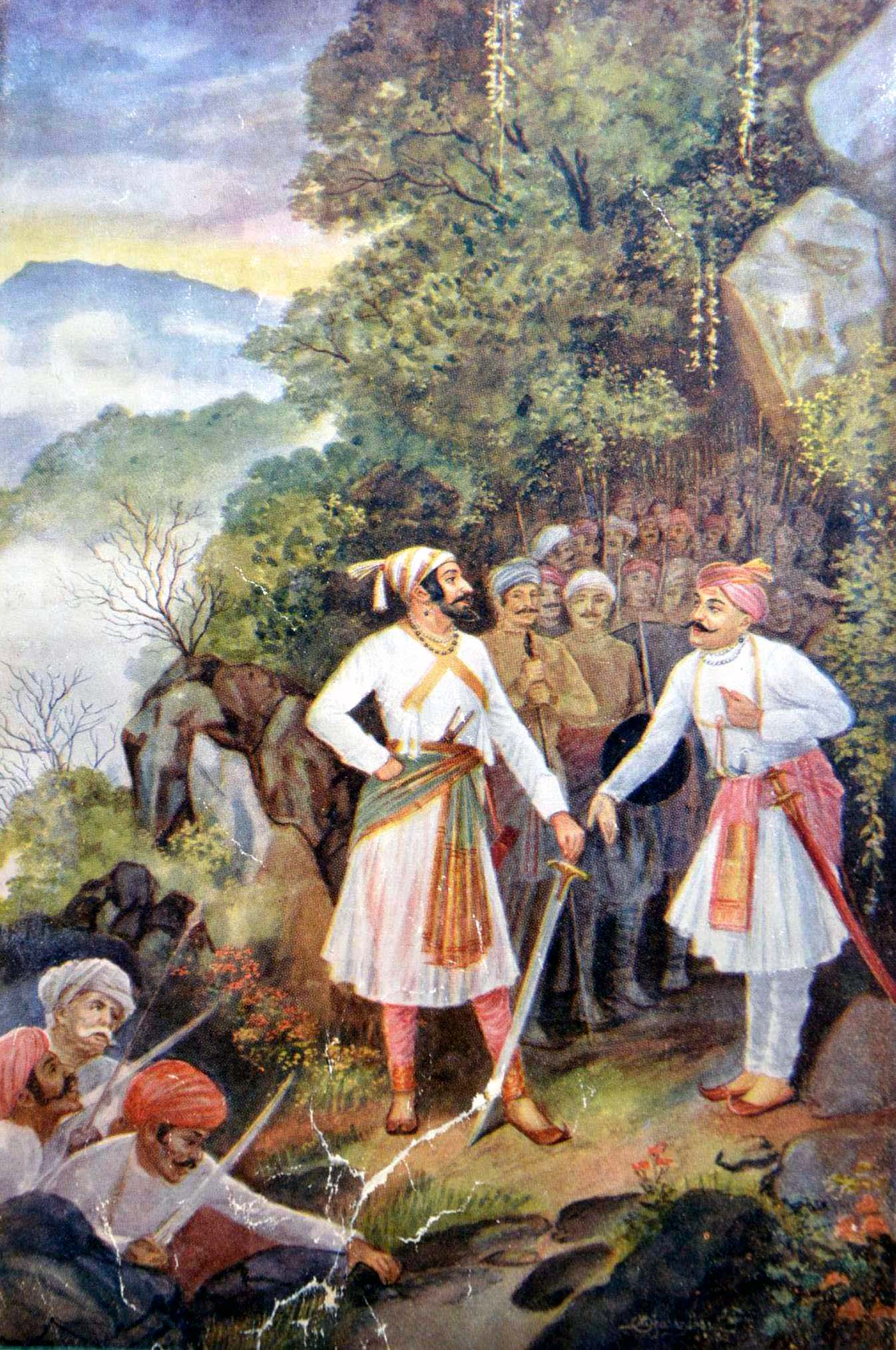
Shivaji Maharaj and Baji Prabhu at Pawan Khind

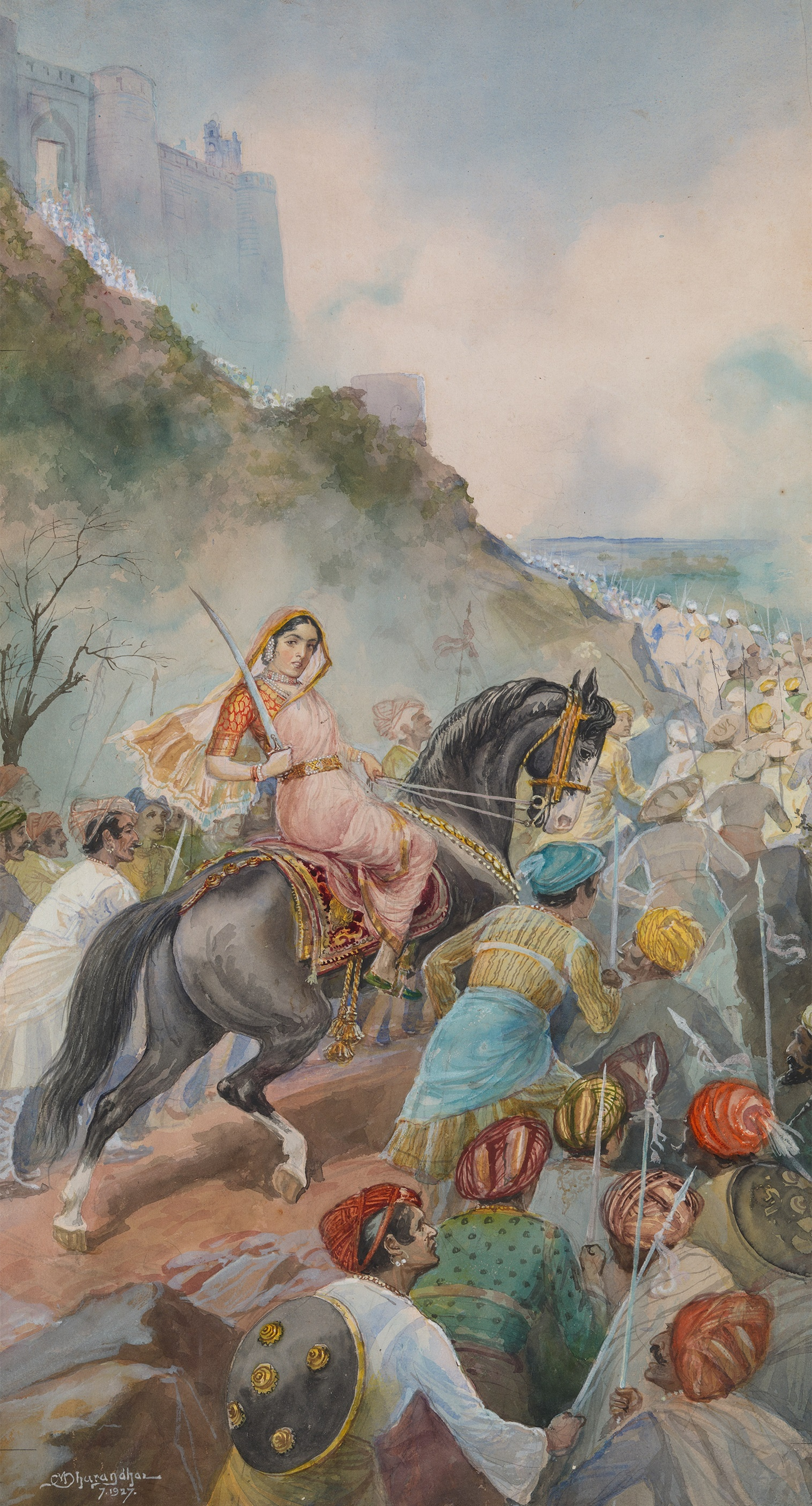
A 1927 depiction of Tarabai in battle.

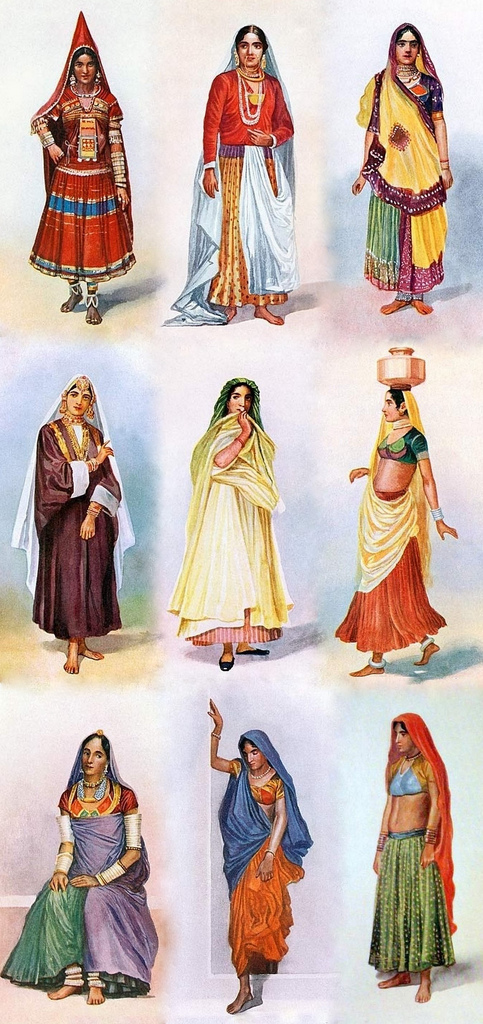
Lengha Choli

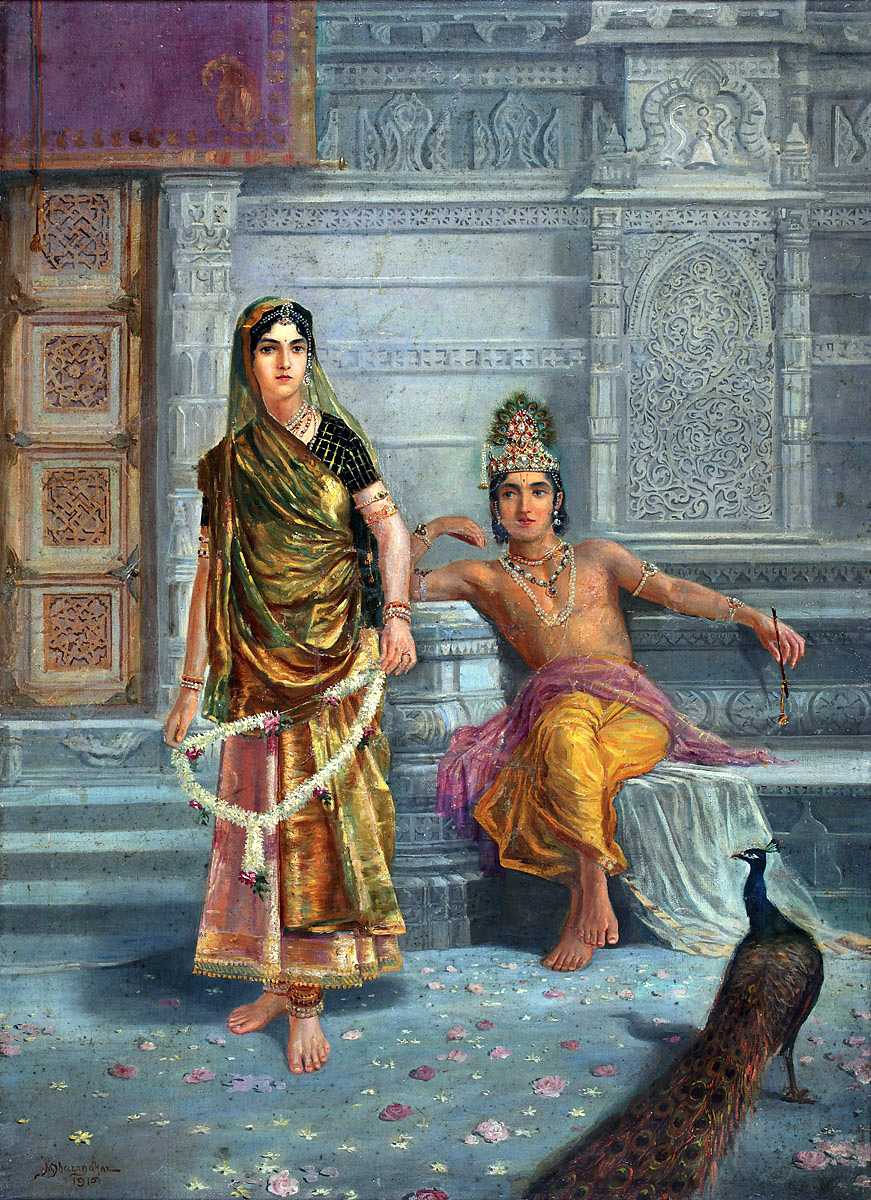
Radha and Krishna

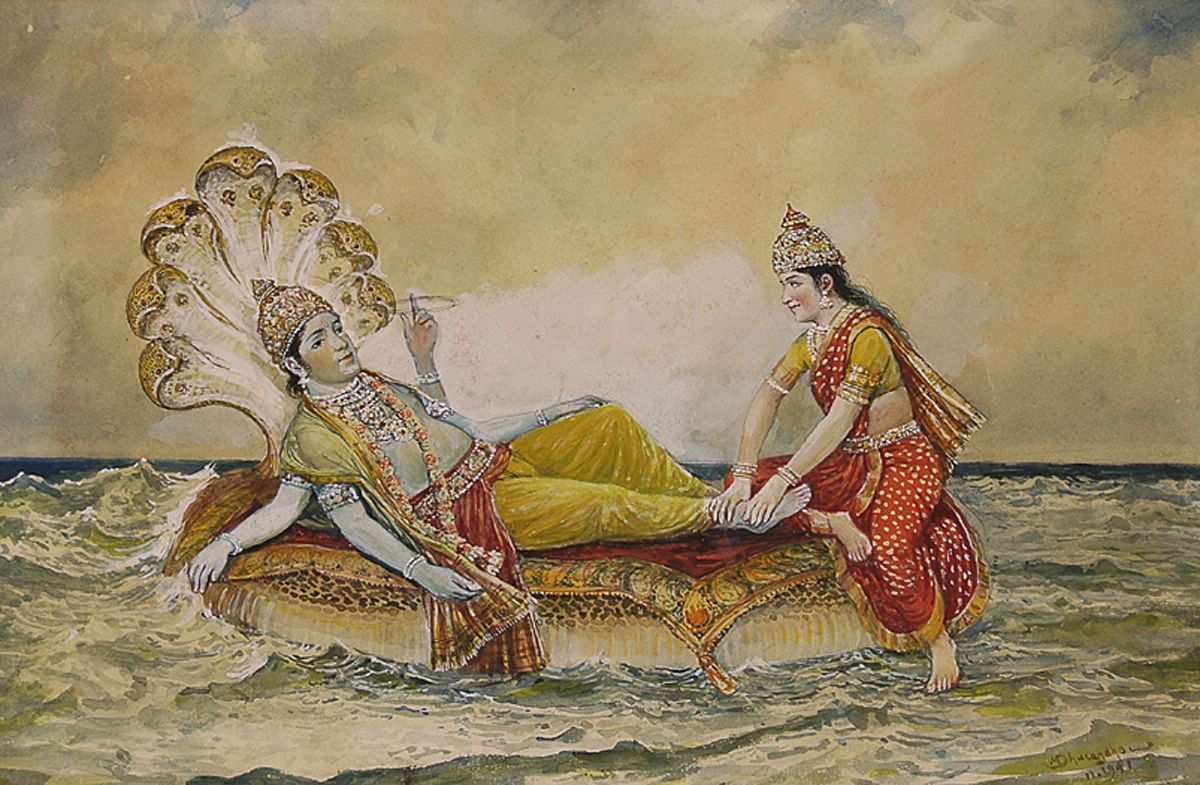
Sheshashayi - Laxminarayan

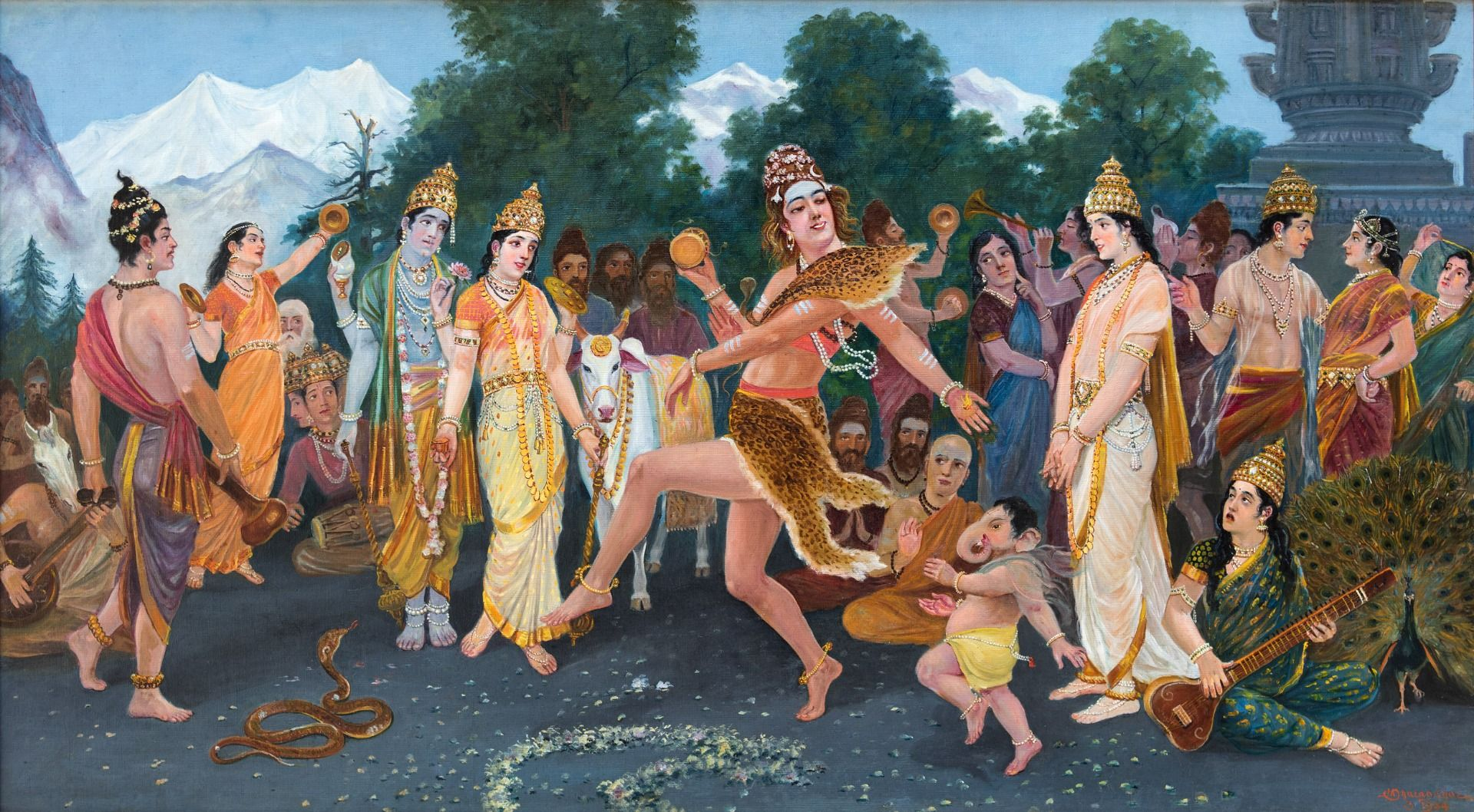
Shiva's Twilight Dance

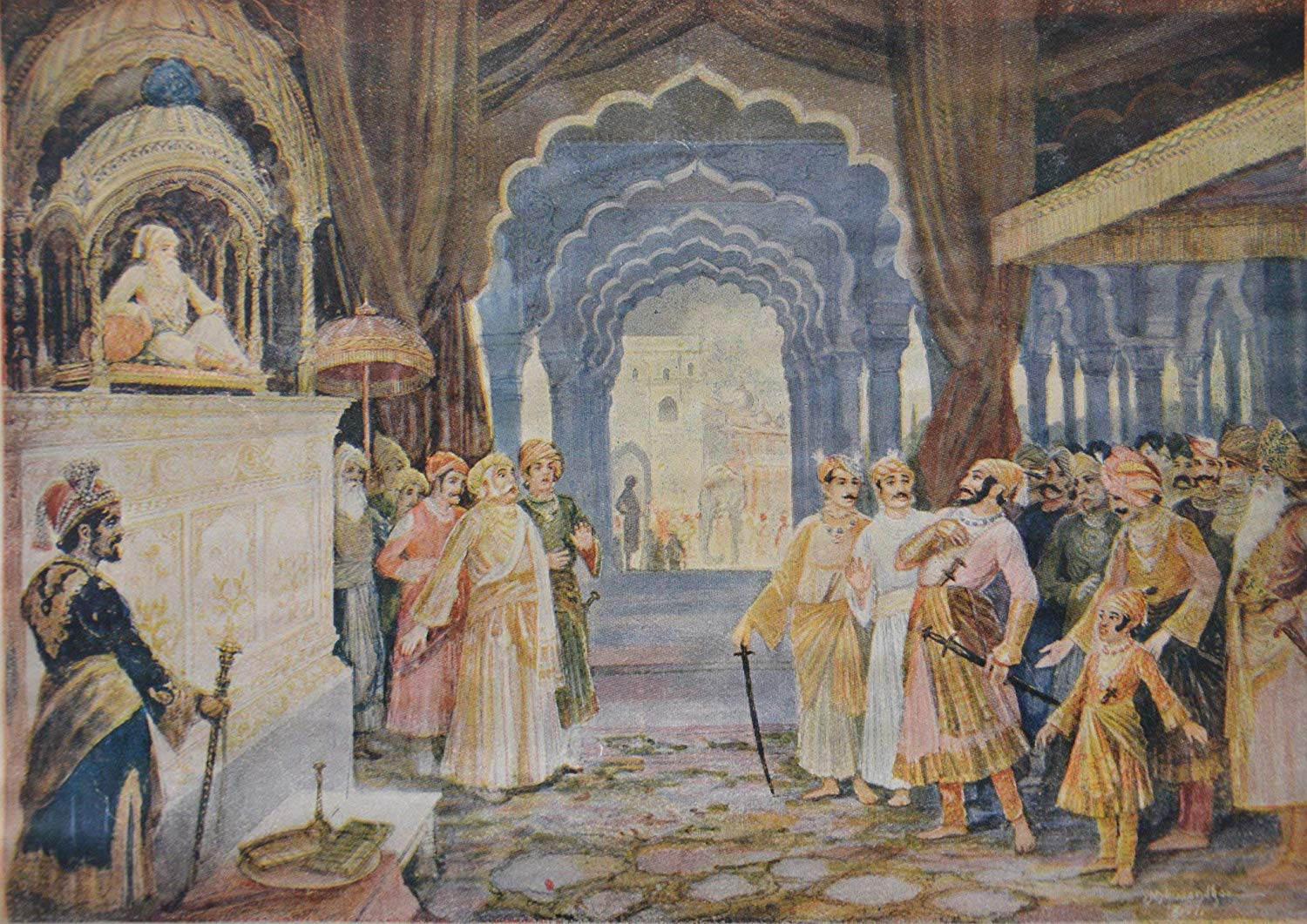
Agra visit of Raja Shivaji at Aurangzeb's Darbar

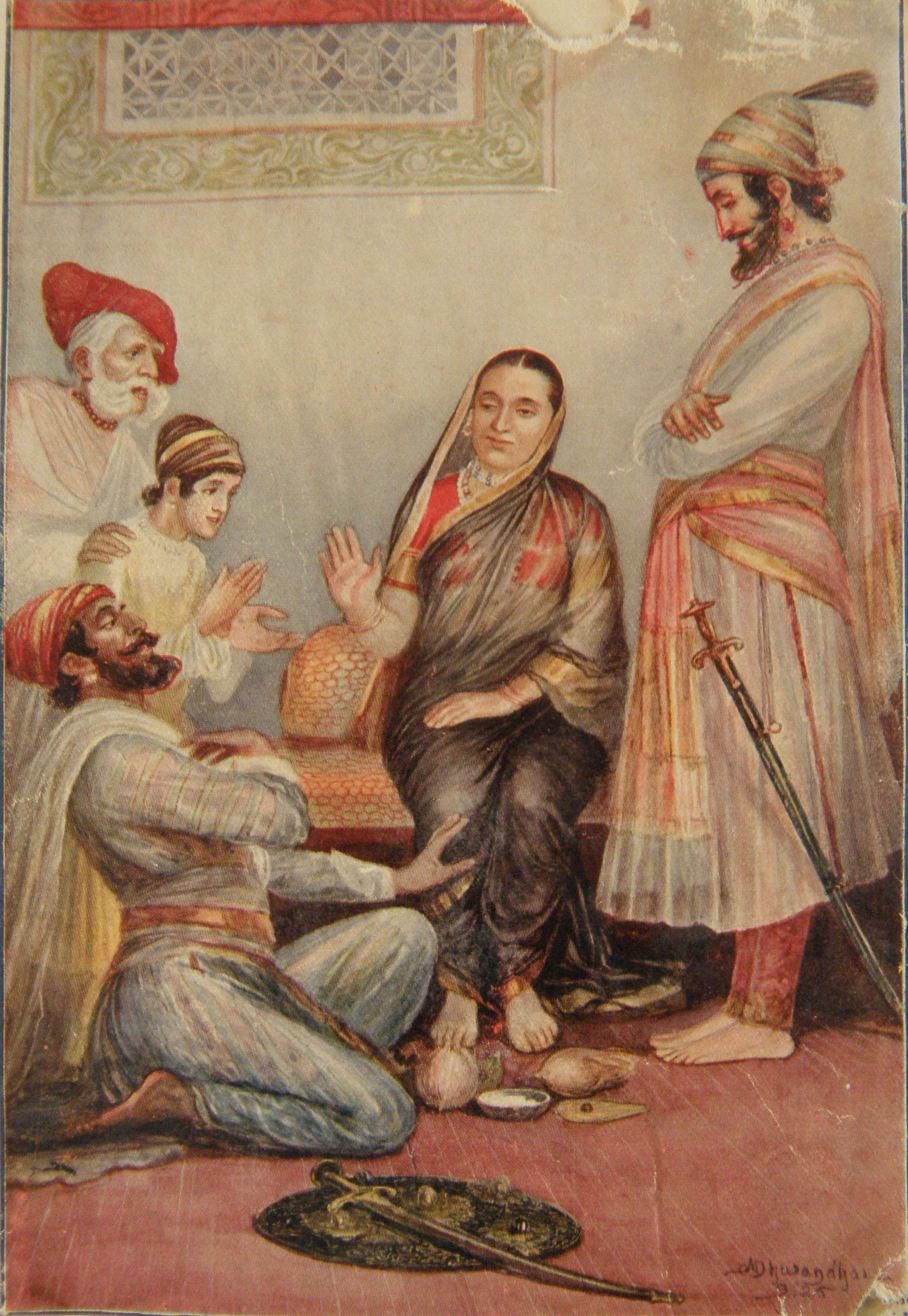
Tanaji's famous vow during Kondana fort campaign
