= Pattachitra =

Traditional art work of West Bengal and Odisha, India

- Geographical indication
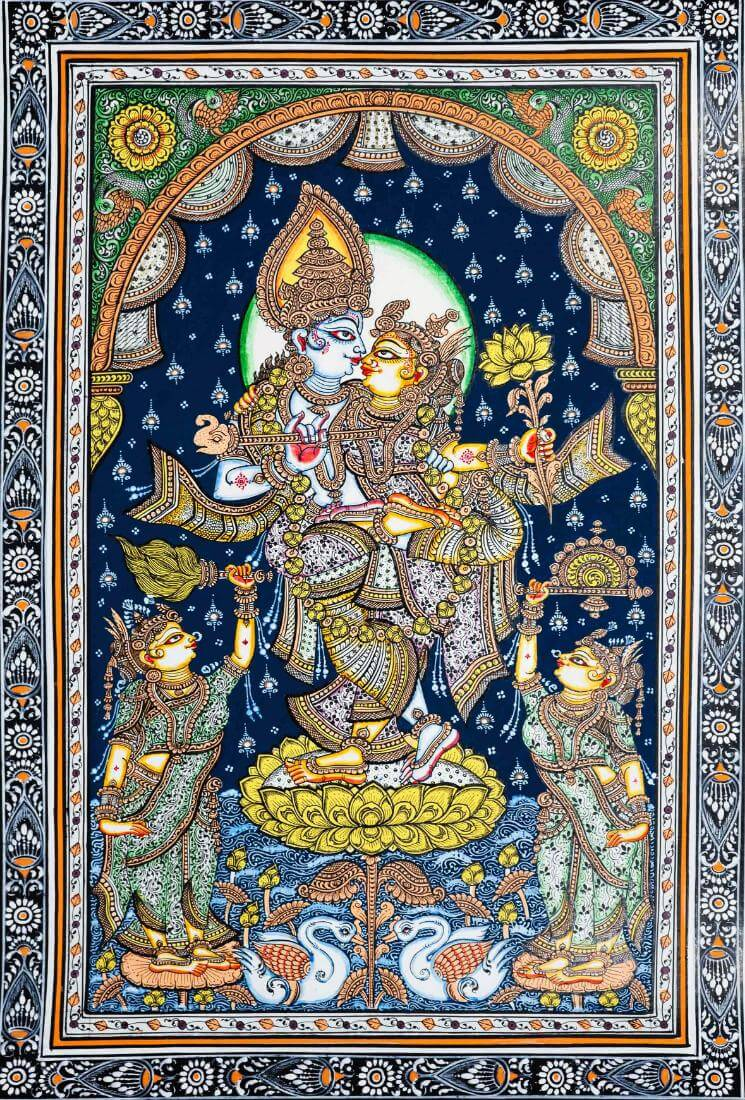
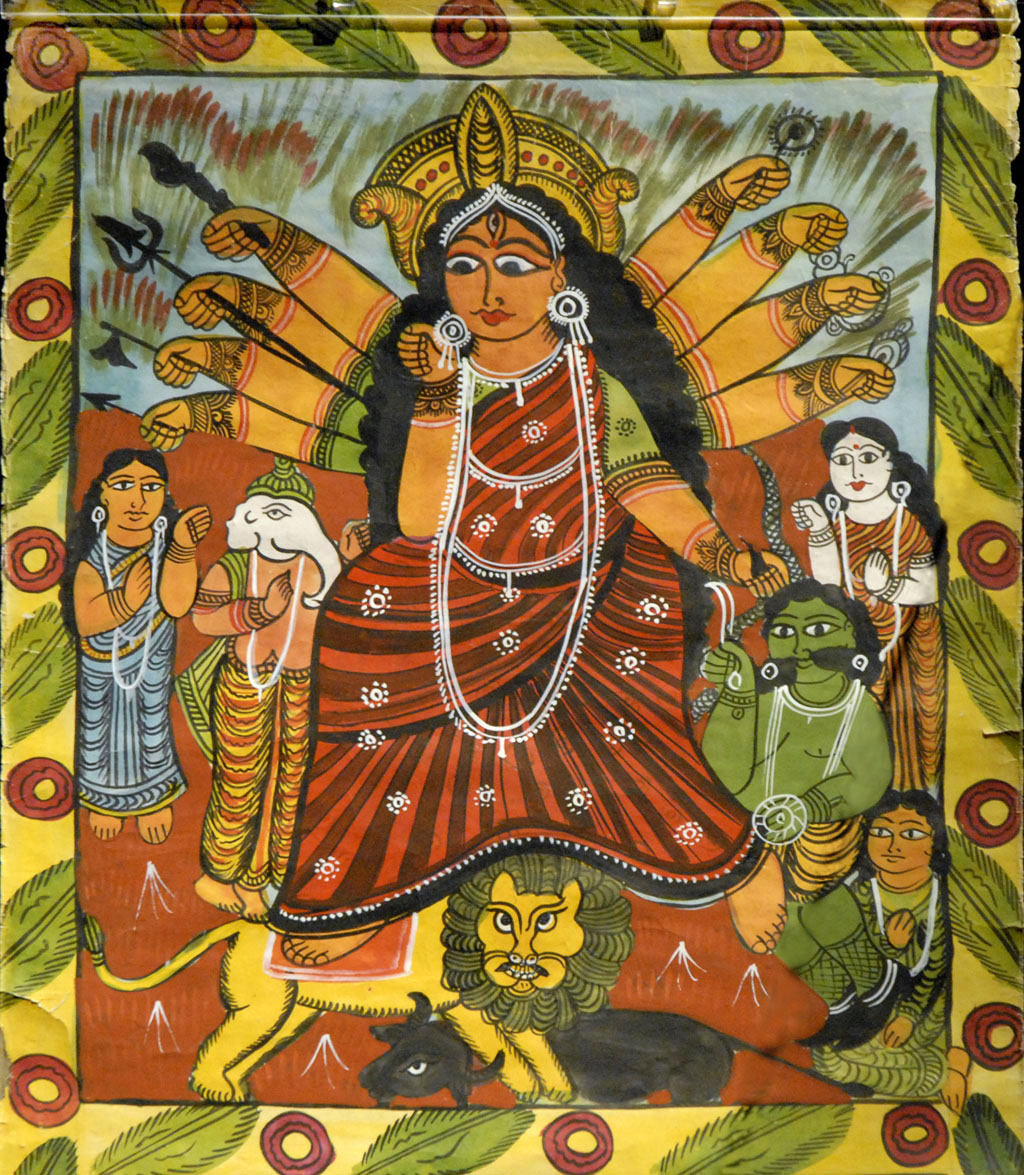
- Odisha Pattachitra (top) depicting Radha Krishna. Bengali Patachitra (bottom) depicting Durga.
- Alternative names: Patachitra
- Description: Patachitra (or Pattachitra in Odisha) is an old traditional art of Odisha and West Bengal
- Area: Raghurajpur, Puri, Danda Sahi, Parlakhemundi, Chikiti, Digapahandi, Sonepur, Dharakote (Odisha); Birbhum, West Midnapore, Nayagram of Pingla block in Jhargram, Bardhaman, Murshidabad district and Kalighat region (West Bengal)
- Country: India
- Registered: Odisha Pattachitra: 10 July 2008; Bengal Patachitra: 28 March 2018
- Material: Cloth, Silk, Palm leaf, Paper, Color, Theme
- Official website: ipindiaservices.gov.in

Patachitra or Pattachitra is a general term for traditional, cloth-based scroll painting, based in the eastern Indian states of Odisha, and West Bengal as well as parts of Bangladesh. Patachitra art form is known for its intricate details as well as mythological narratives and folktales inscribed in it. Pattachitra is one of the ancient artworks of Odisha, originally created for ritual use and as souvenirs for pilgrims to Puri, as well as other temples in Odisha. Patachitras are a component of an ancient Bengali narrative art, originally serving as a visual device during the performance of a song.

== Etymology ==
In Sanskrit, the word paṭṭa means "cloth" and chitra means "picture". Most of these paintings depict stories of Hindu deities.

== Early history ==
Charanachitras, Mankhas, Yamapatas were ancient forms of paintings executed on textile-scrolls and dealt with themes of a narrative-didactic nature of storytelling, which finds mentions in Hindu, Jain and Buddhist texts. According to historian N.R Ray, these textile-scroll paintings were ancestors of the Pattachitra art form.

== Odisha Patachitra ==
Pattachitra is a traditional painting of Odisha, India. Originating at puri. These paintings are based on Hinduism and specially inspired by Jagannath and Vaishnava traditions. All colours used in the Paintings are natural and paintings are made ancient traditional way by Chitrakaras that is Odiya Painter. Pattachitra style of painting is one of the oldest and most popular art forms of Odisha. The name Pattachitra has evolved from the Sanskrit words patta, meaning canvas, and chitra, meaning picture. Pattachitra is thus a painting done on canvas, and is manifested by rich colourful application, creative motifs, designs, and portrayal of simple themes, mostly mythological in depiction. The traditions of pattachitra paintings are more than thousand years old.

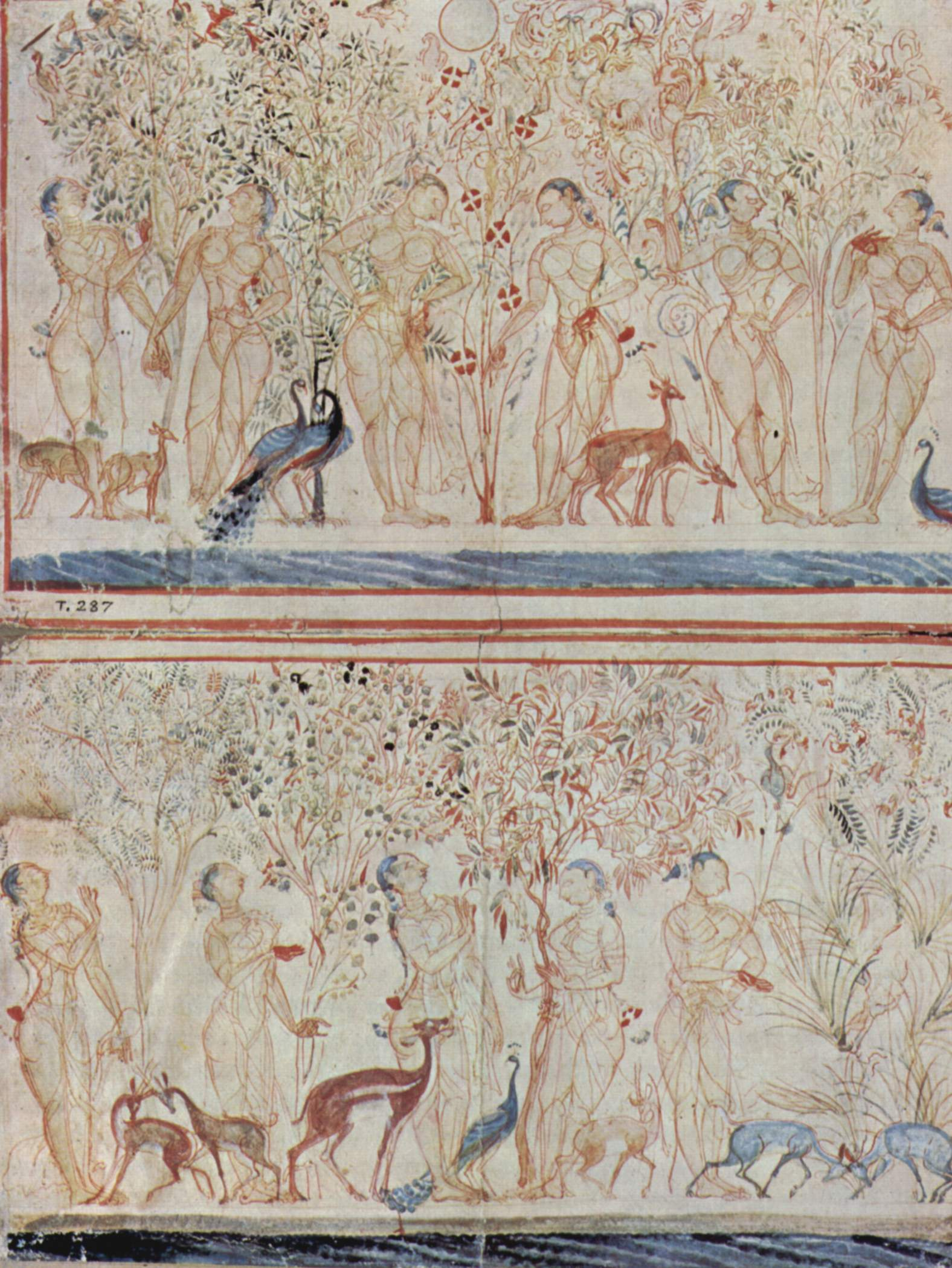
Study of a Pattachitra painting depicting the Gopis on the banks of the Yamuna, circa 1550. Odisha.

=== Origin ===
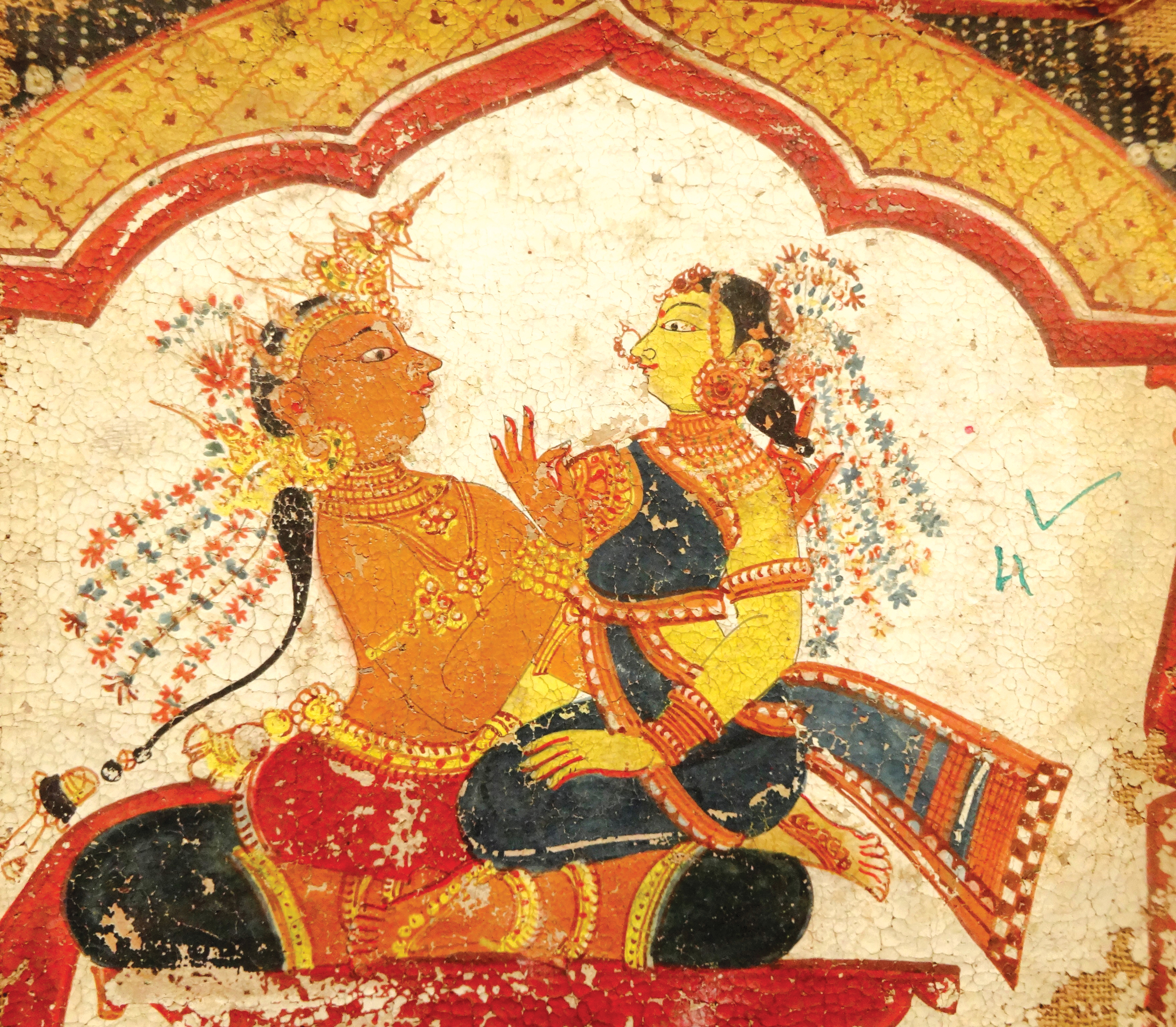
Pattachitra painting of Raga Kodaba of Odissi music depicted in the form of two lovers. Pigment on cloth, 16 x 12cm, Odisha, mid-nineteenth century. Private collection

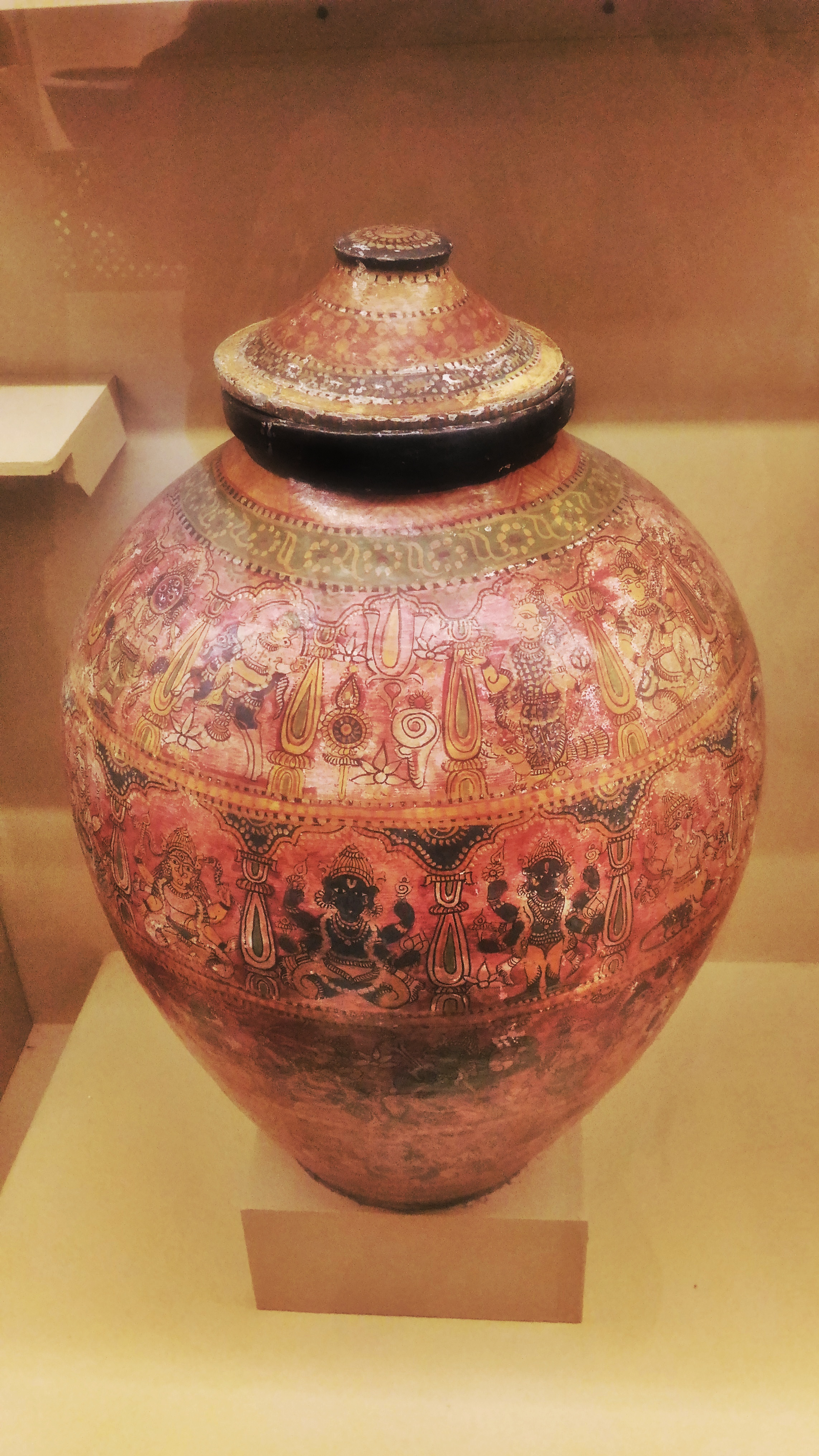
Large earthen pot with the outer surface and the lid painted with Pattachitra, Odisha Museum, India.

The paintings of Odisha can be divided into three categories from the point of view of medium, i.e. paintings on cloth or 'Patta Chitra', paintings on walls or 'Bhitti Chitra' and palm leaf engravings or "Tala Patra Chitra" or "Pothi, Chitra'. The style of all these remains more or less the same at a specific time because then the artists were commissioned to work in all these media, it is believed.

The painting, the pattachitra, resembles the old murals of Odisha, especially religious centres of Puri, Konark and Bhubaneswar region, dating back to the 5th century BC. The best work is found in and around Puri, especially in the village of Raghurajpur.

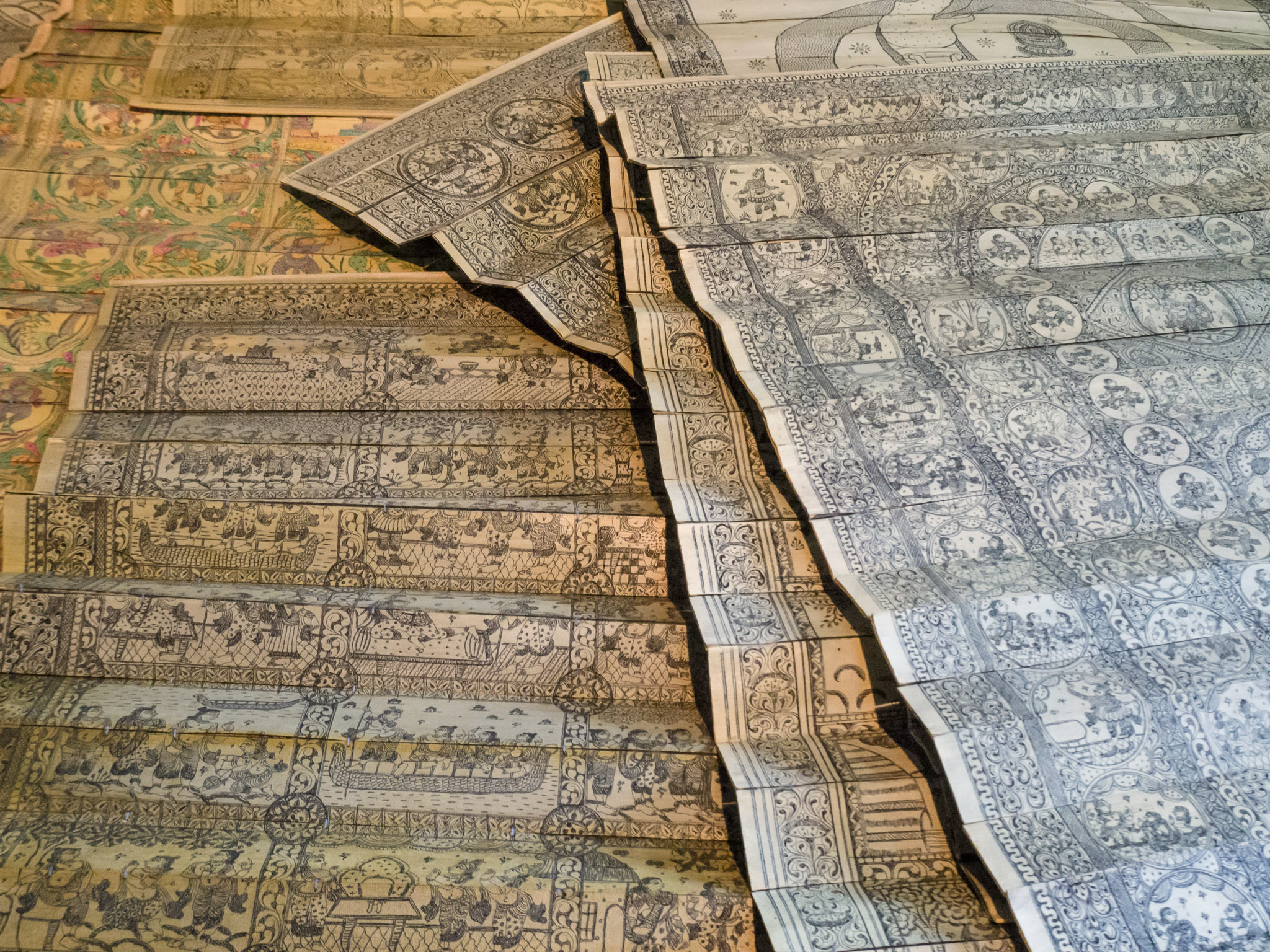
Pattachitra made on palm leaf, Odisha.

This old tradition of Odia painting still survives in places like Puri, Raghurajpur, Paralakhemundi, Chikiti and Sonepur. Lord Jagannath in the present form is being taken as the origin of the Patta style. The colour schemes of the deities of Puri are quite similar to those of the Patta style. The oldest record of Patta Paintings probably does not go beyond the establishment of the present shrine of Shri Jagannath at Puri. It may be since paintings do not survive like sculptures. The paints inside the shrines of Lord Jagannath at Puri make the date probable. The oldest classical marble paintings of Sitabanji at Keonjhar do not conform to the present style of Patta painting wholly. The wooden statues of the three deities are also covered with cloth and then overlaid with glue mixed with chalk, and then given paint only with four limited colours of red, yellow, white and black. The deities who are held in high esteem by the Odias and who inspire religion, life and activity of the people also carry with them a tradition of art and painting which is as old as the deities themselves. If the Savara origin of Jagannath is accepted, the date of the Patta paintings can be dated back to an earlier period. These paintings were originally substitutes for worship on days when the idols were kept away from the public after their ritual bath.

=== Theme and style ===
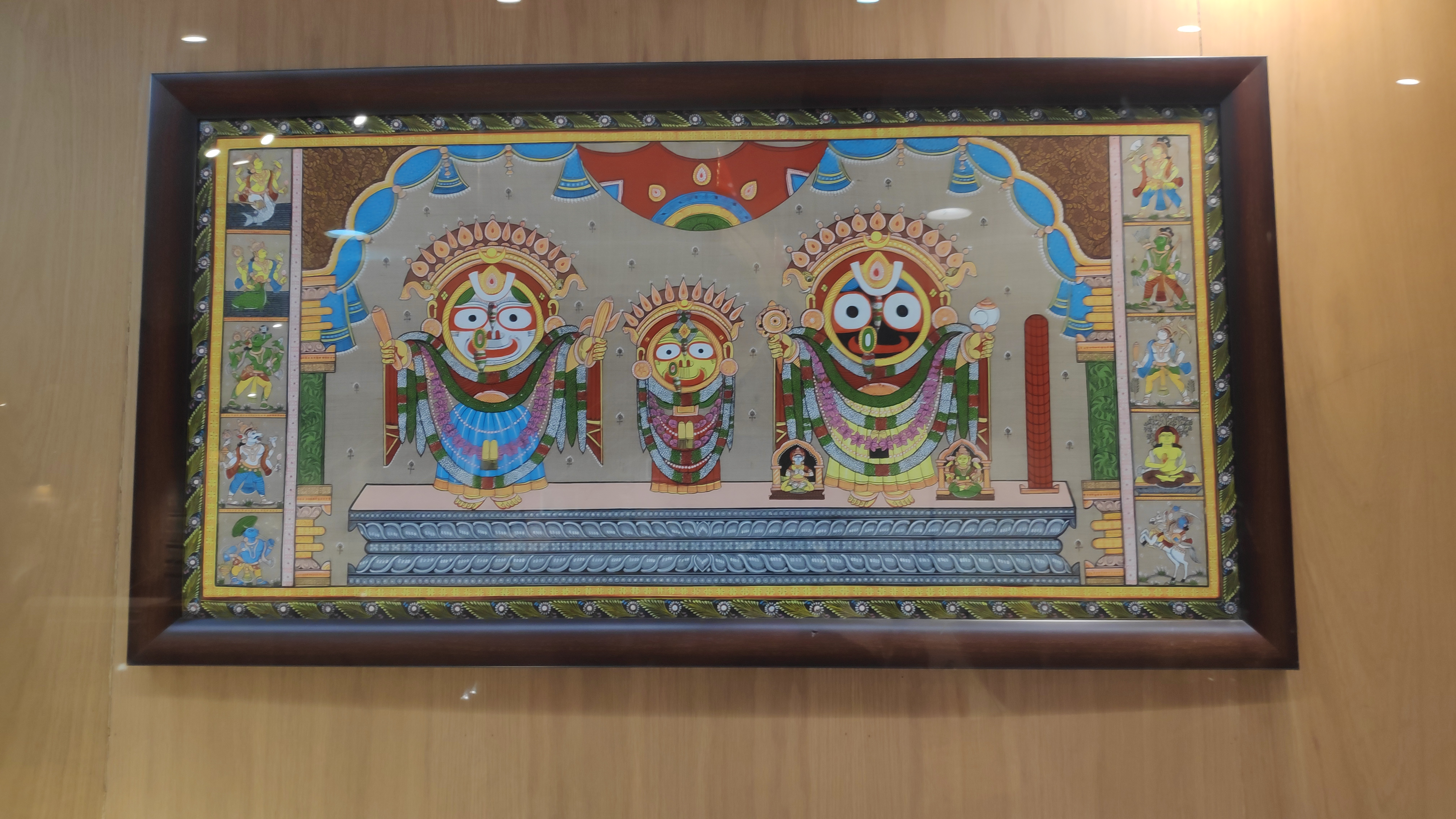
Pattachitra of Lord Jagarnath

The theme of Odia painting centres round the Jagannath and the Vaishnava sect. Since the beginning of Pattachitra culture, Lord Jagannath who was an incarnation of Lord Krishna has been the major source of inspiration. The subject matter of Pattachitra is mostly mythological, religious stories and folk lore. Themes are chiefly on Lord Jagannath and Radha-Krishna, different "Vesas" of Shri Jagannath, Balabhadra and Subhadra, temple activities, the ten incarnations of Vishnu basing on the 'Gita Govinda' of Jayadev, Kama Kujara Navagunjara, Ramayana, Mahabharata. The individual paintings of gods and goddesses are also being painted.

The Pattachitra style is a mix of both folk and classical elements, but leans more towards folk forms. The dress style has Ancient odia influences. All of the poses have been confined to a few well-defined postures. These are not free from monotonous repetitions, though at times this is necessary to accentuate the narrative character of the style. The lines are bold and clean and angular and sharp. Generally, there are no landscapes, perspectives, or distant views. All the incidents are seen in close juxtaposition. The background on which the figures are represented is delineated with decorations of flowers and foliage, and is mostly painted in red colour. All the paintings are given decorative borders. The whole painting is conceived in the form of a design on a given canvas.

The themes may be classified into following categories

- Jagannath paintings
- Vaishnav Paintings
- Bhagabat paintings
- Ramayana paintings
- Saiva paintings
- Shakta paintings
- Paintings as legends
- Ragachitras
- Bandhachitra
- Yamapati and yatripatas – (sketches of puri temple) Ganjapa playing card paintings and other social themes on paintings.
- Navagunjara

=== Technique ===
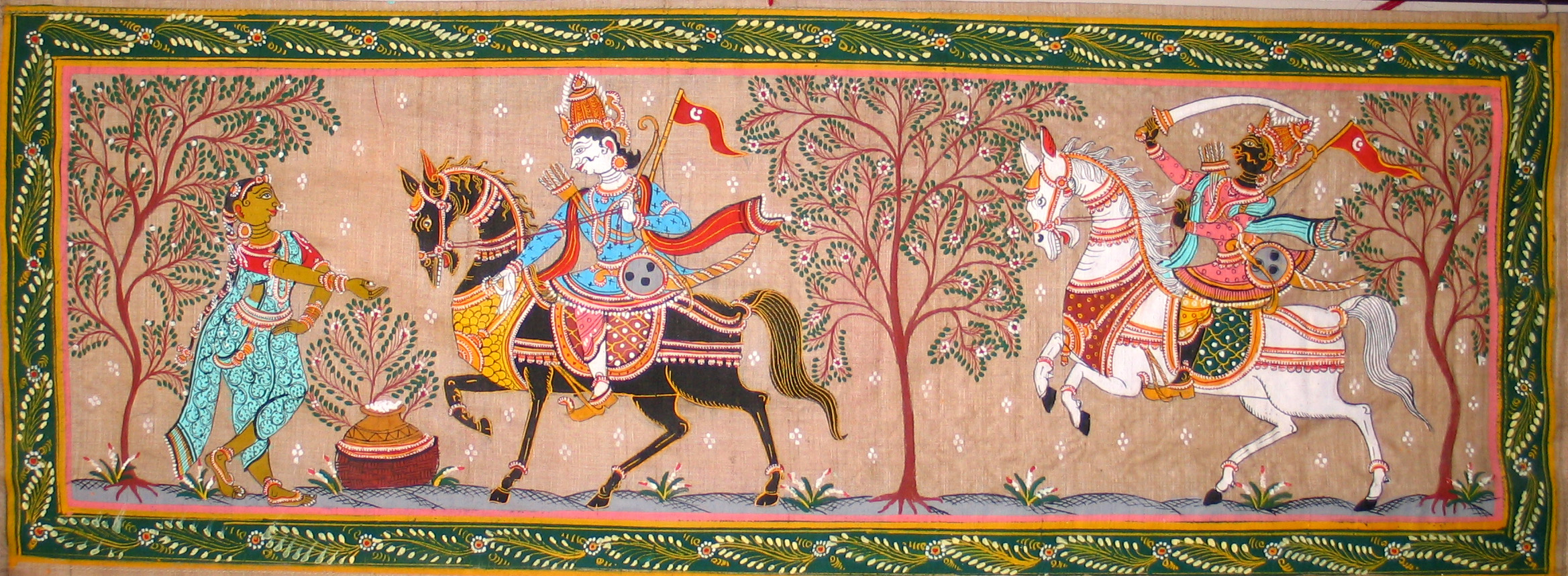
Modern-day Pattachitra depicting Kanchi Bijaya. Pattachitras were inspired by Jagannath culture in Odisha

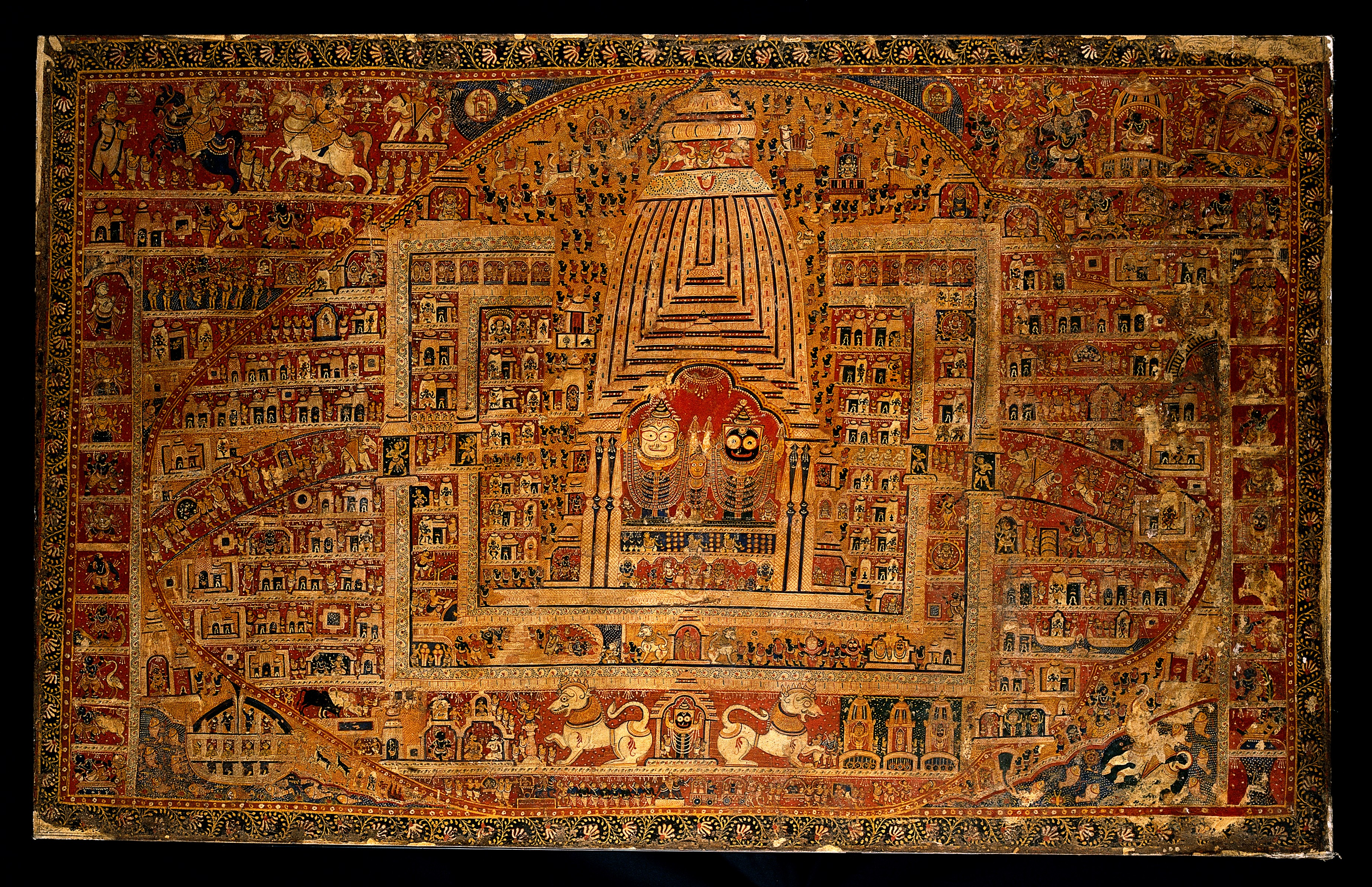
Sankhanabhi Pata, Pattachitra map of the Puri temple, with many human and sacred figures, buildings and animals. By a painter of Puri, Odisha, ca. 1880/1910.

Traditionally, the painters are known as chitrakars. A patta painter's home with all the members of the family is his studio. Woman members prepare the glue, the canvas and apply colours which we call the fill-in, and give the final lacquer coating. The master hand, mostly the male member, draws the initial line and gives the final finishing touch.

Patta paintings are done on small strips of cotton cloth. The canvas is prepared by coating the clothing with a mixture of chalk and gum made from Guar or tamarind seeds. Then it is rubbed by taking the help of two different stones, and then the cloth is dried. The mixture of gum and chalk gives the cloth's surface a leathery finish on which the artists paint with vegetable, earth and stone colours.

The painters do not use pencil or charcoal for the preliminary drawings. They are so expert in the line that they simply draw directly with the brush, either in light red or yellow. Then the colours are filled in. The final lines are drawn, and the patta is given a lacquer coating to protect it from the weather, thus making the painting glossy. This process of glazing or varnishing is quite interesting. The painting is held over a fireplace so that the back of the painting is exposed to heat. On the surface of the painting, fine lacquer is applied.

=== Colour ===
Pattachitras are painted in five natural colours - Hingula, Haritala, Kala, Sankha and Geru, which are: Vermilion, Green, Black, Pearl White and Brick Orange respectively. There are typical scenes and figures, like Krishna, Gopis, elephants, trees, and other creatures are seen in these paintings. Krishna is always painted in blue and the Gopis in light pink, purple or brown colours.

The painters use vegetable and mineral colours without going for factory-made poster colours. They prepare their own colours. White colour is made from the conch-shells by powdering, boiling and filtering in a very hazardous process. It requires a lot of patience. But this process gives brilliance and prominence to the hue. 'Hingula', a mineral colour, is used for red. 'Haritala', king of stone ingredients for yellow, 'Ramaraja', a sort of indigo for blue, are being used. Pure lamp-black or black prepared from the burning of coconut shells are used. There was no blue, either cobalt or ultramarine, in the earlier colour schemes. The colours used in the Patta paintings are primarily bright colours, limited to red, yellow, indigo, black and white. The brushes that are used by these 'Chitrakaras' are also indigenous and are made of hair of domestic animals. A bunch of hair tied to the end of a bamboo stick makes the brush.

=== Palm leaf Pattachitra ===
Palm leaf pattachitra, which is in the Odia language known as Tala Pattachitra drawn on a palm leaf. First of all, palm leaves are left to harden after being taken from the tree. Then these are sewn together to form like a canvas. The images are traced by using black or white ink to fill grooves etched on rows of equal-sized panels of palm leaf that are sewn together. These panels can also be easily folded like a fan and packed in a compact pile for better conservation. Often, palm-leaf illustrations are more elaborate, obtained by superimposing layers that are glued together for most of the surface, but in some areas can open like small windows to reveal a second image under the first layer.

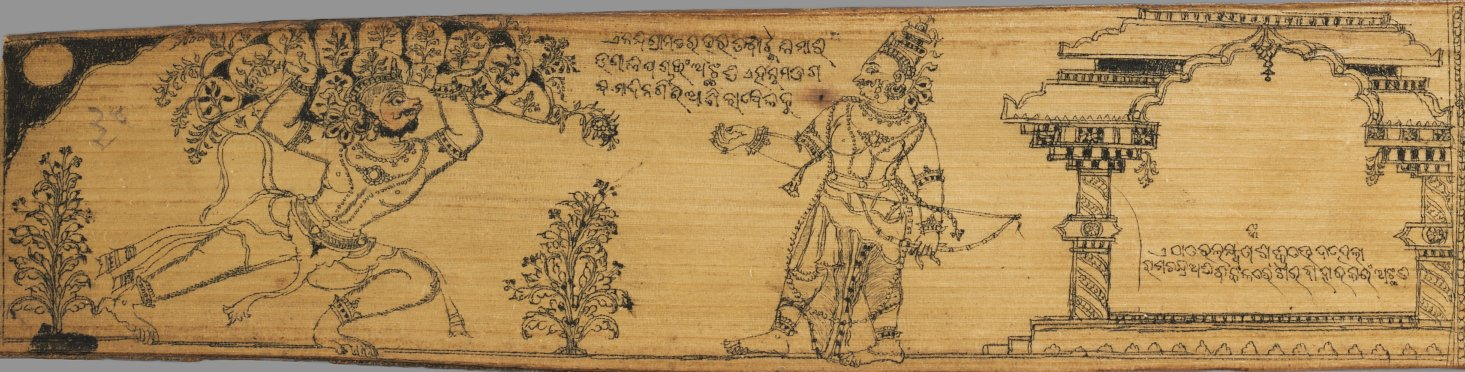
Tala-pattachitra, palm leaf manuscript illustrating Labanyabati of Kabi Samrata Upendra Bhanja. Left detail, India, Odisha, late 18th century - Hanuman and Bharata at Nandigrama (verso) - 1979.21.b - Cleveland Museum of Art.

=== Gallery ===
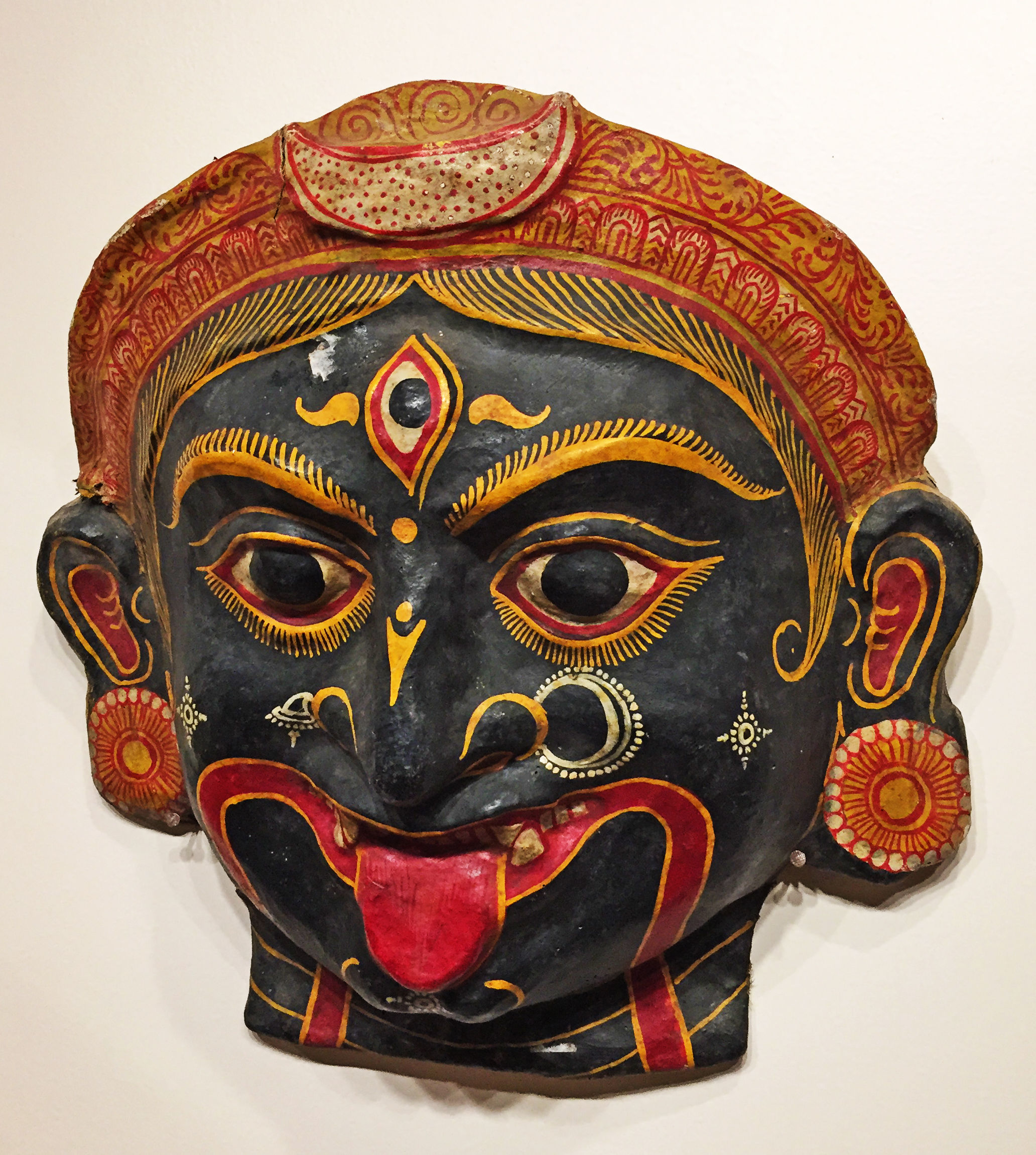
Papier-mâché mask of Goddess Kali painted in the Pattachitra idiom, Kala Bhoomi Odisha Crafts Museum, Bhubaneswar.

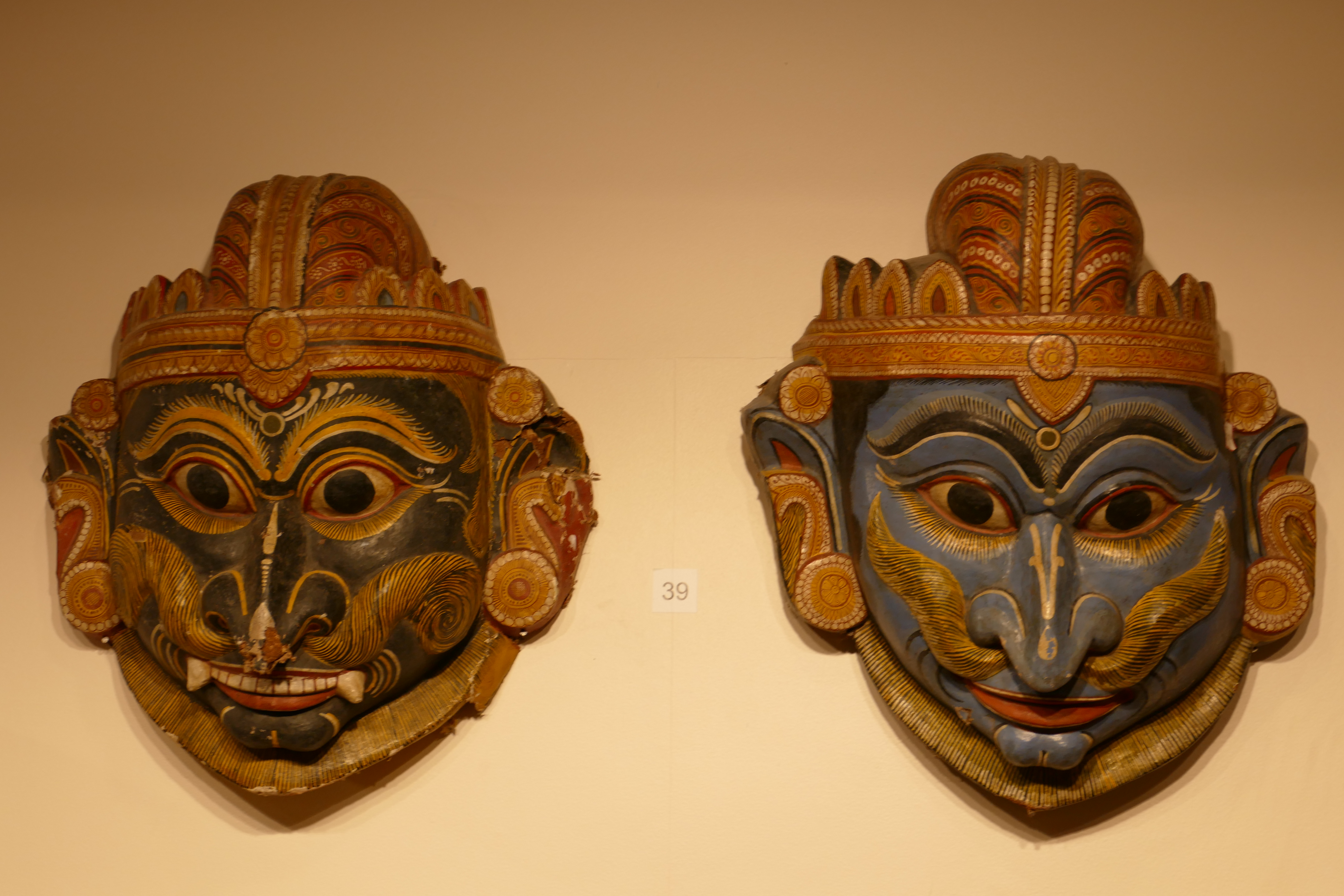
Wooden Ramalila masks painted in the Pattachitra style, Kala Bhoomi Odisha Crafts Museum, Bhubaneswar.

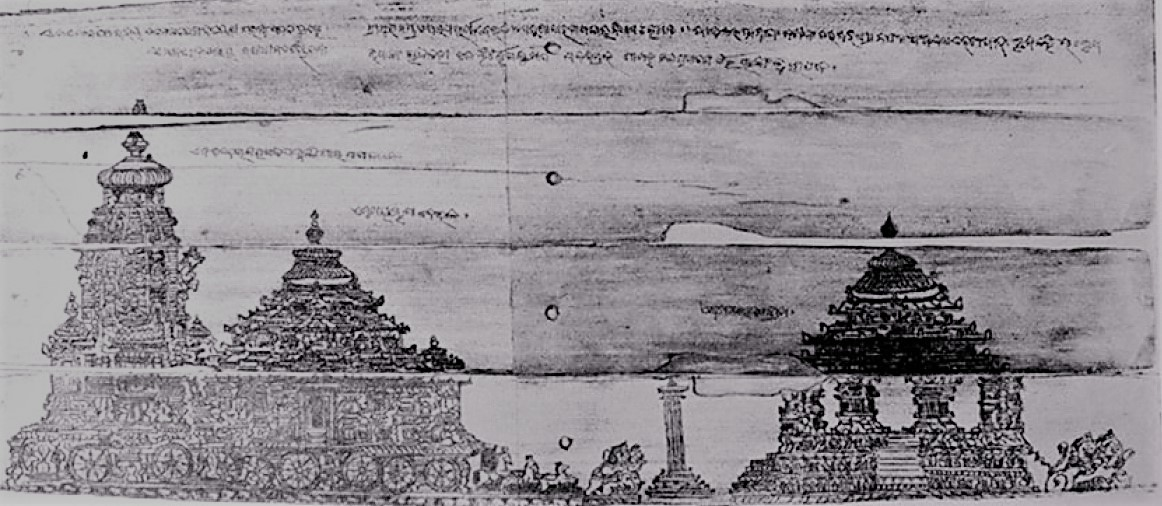
Tala Pattachitra, palm leaf painting showing the architectural plan of the Sun Temple of Konark, Odisha.

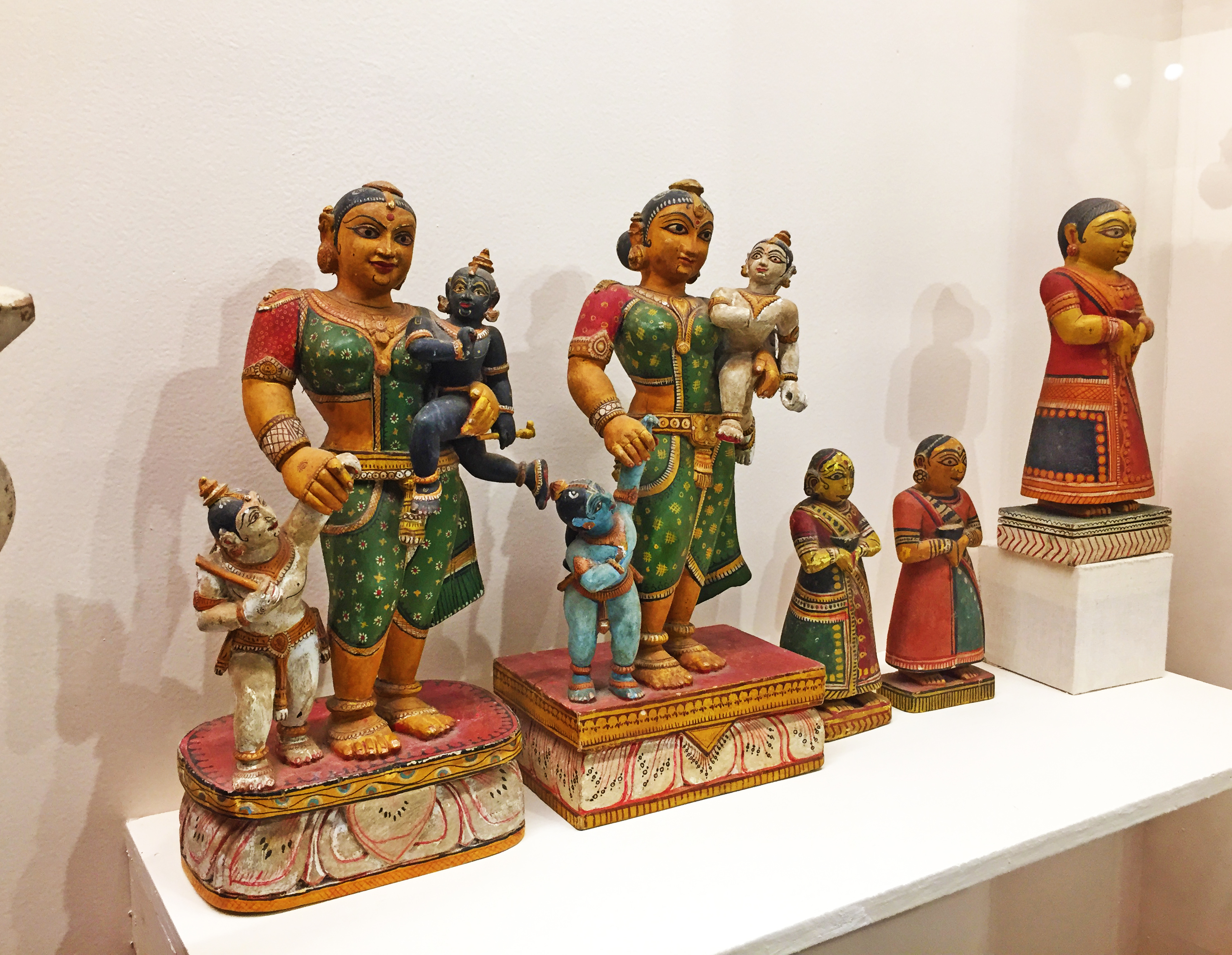
Wooden statuettes painted in the Pattachitra style, Kala Bhoomi Odisha Crafts Museum, Bhubaneswar.

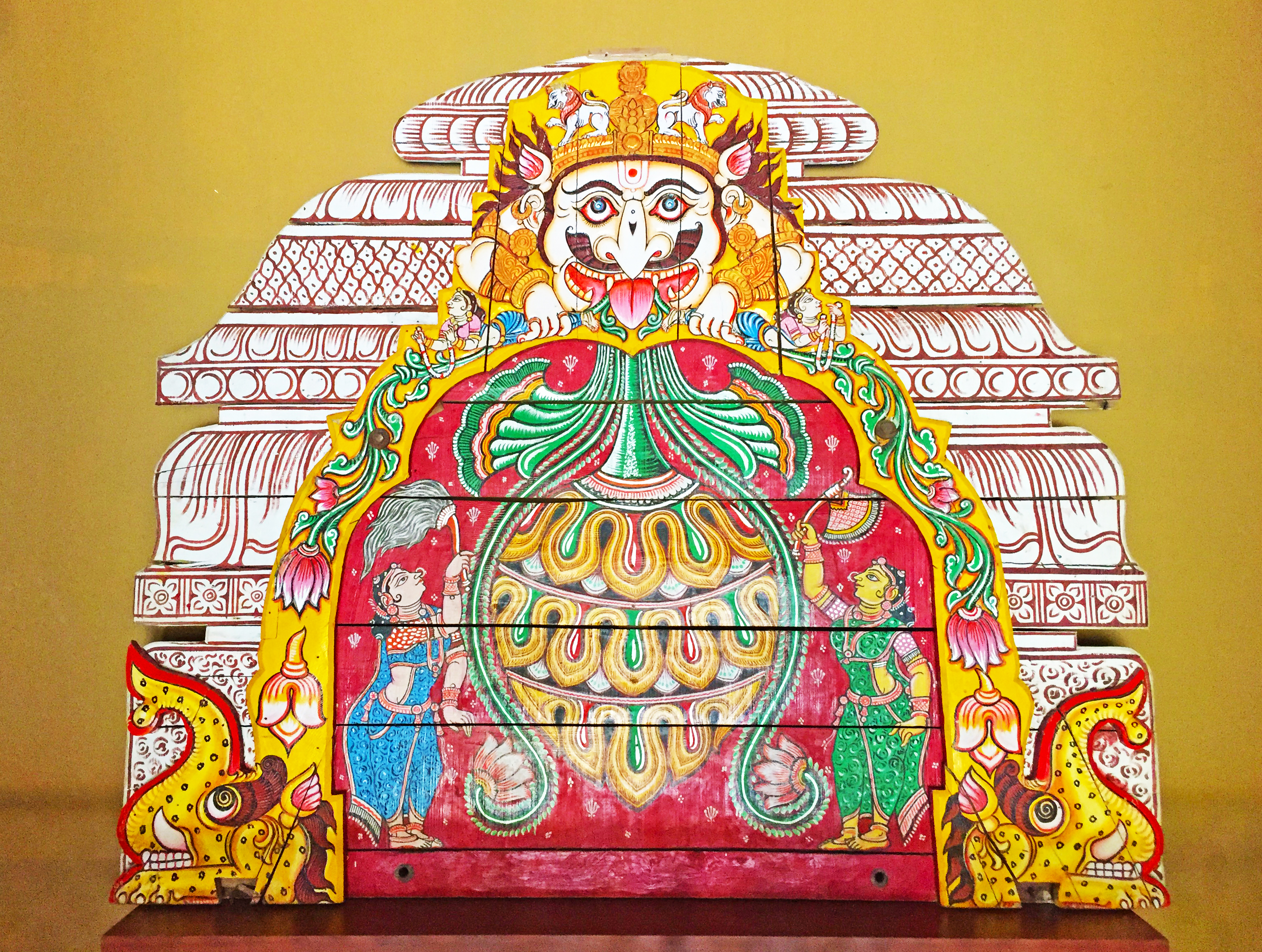
Prabha of Devi Subhadra's Ratha, Puri, Odisha.

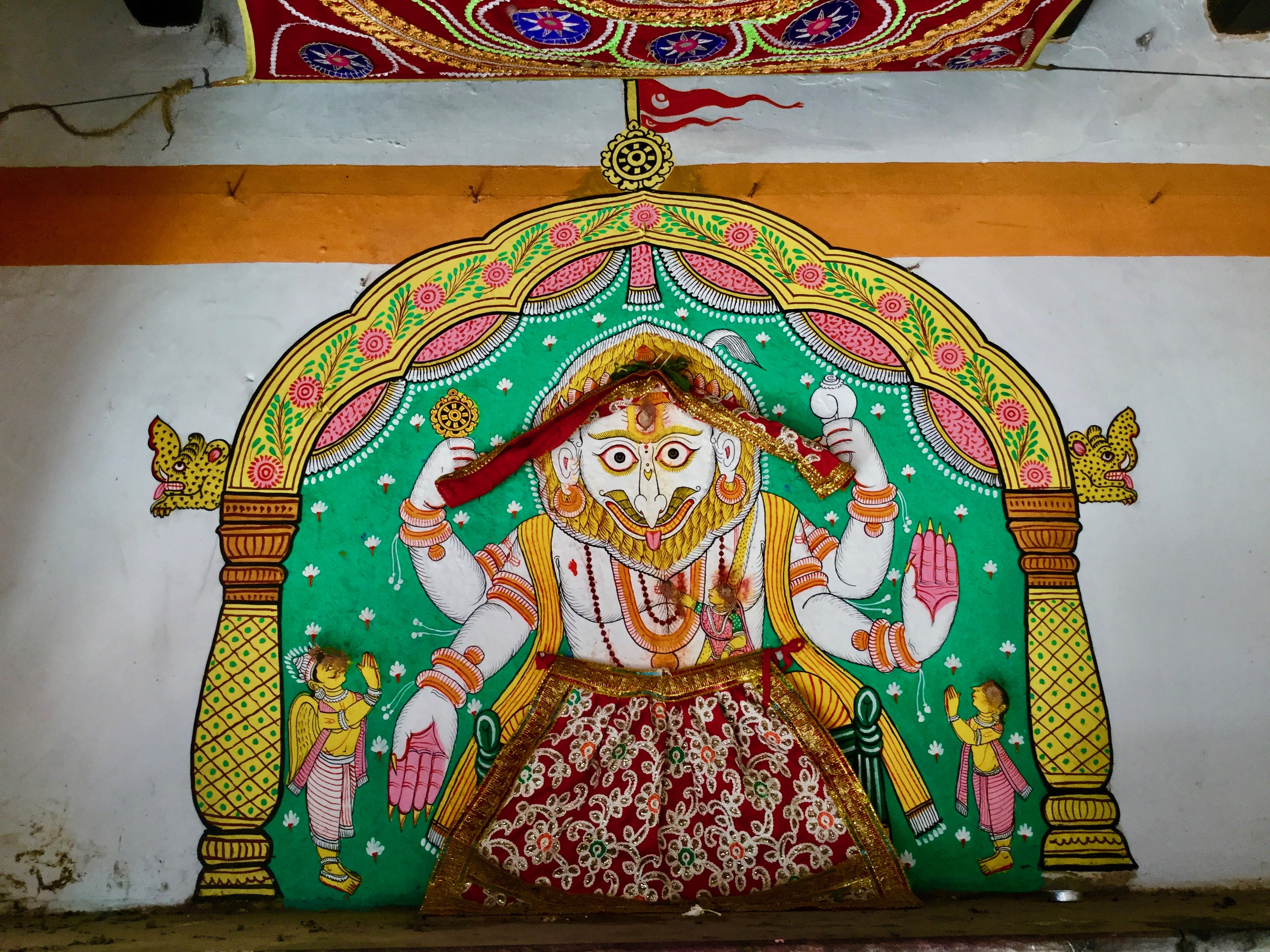
Modern wall mural of Narasimha in a street of Puri, Odisha.

== Bengal Pattachitra ==
The Bengal Patachitra refers to the painting of West Bengal and Bangladesh. It is a traditional and mythological heritage of West Bengal. The Bengal Patachitra is divided into some different aspects like Durga Pat, Chalchitra, Tribal Patachitra, Medinipur Patachitra, and Kalighat Patachitra. The subject matter of Bengal Patachitra is mostly mythological, religious stories, folk lore and social. The Kalighat Patachitra, the last tradition of Bengal Patachitra is developed by Jamini Roy. The artist of the Bengal Patachitra is called Patua.

Patachitra of Naya village in West Bengal is now collected in National Museum of Ethnology (henceforth MNE) in Lisbon.

The Bengal Patachitra

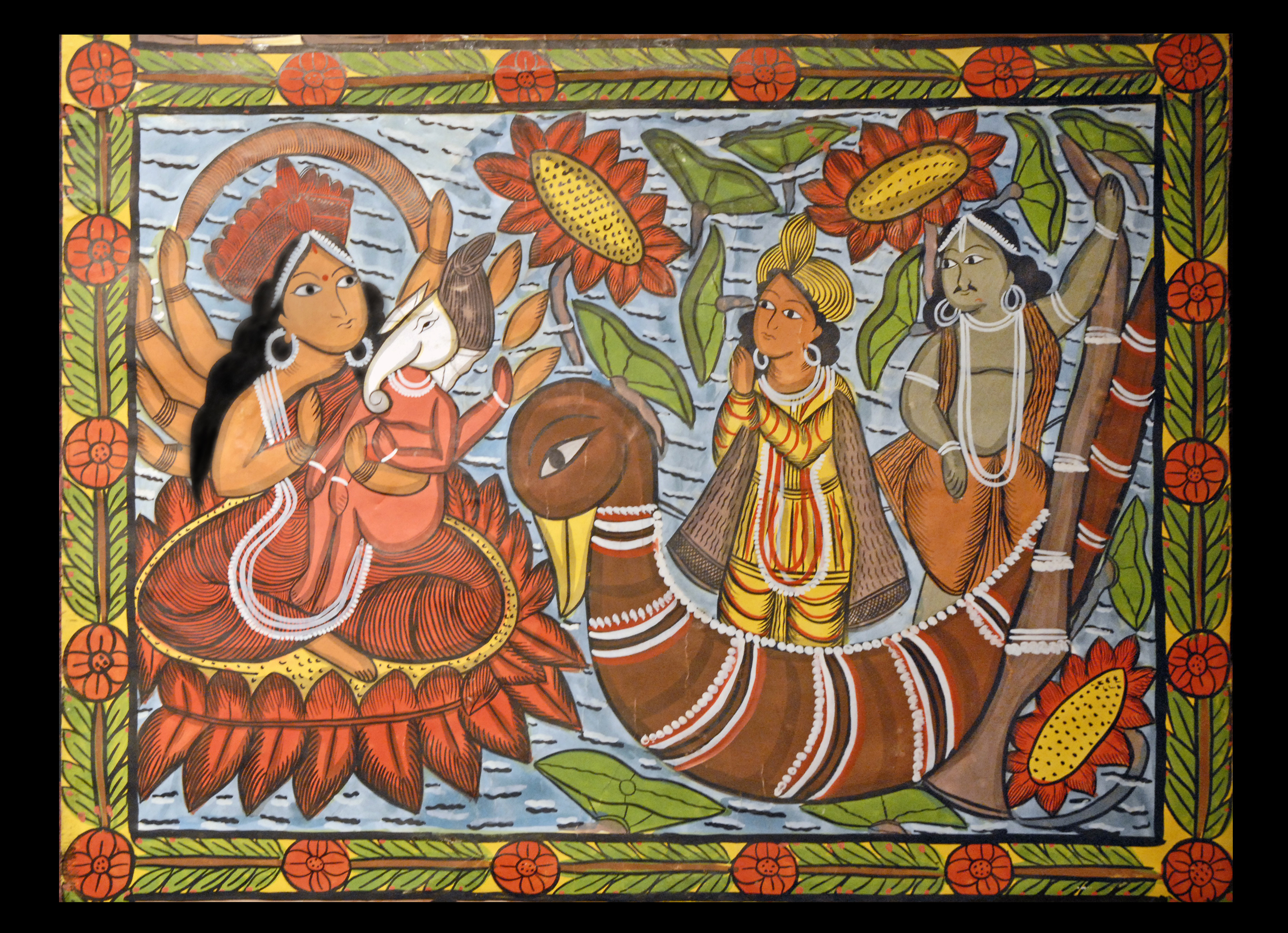
Patachitra of Naya village

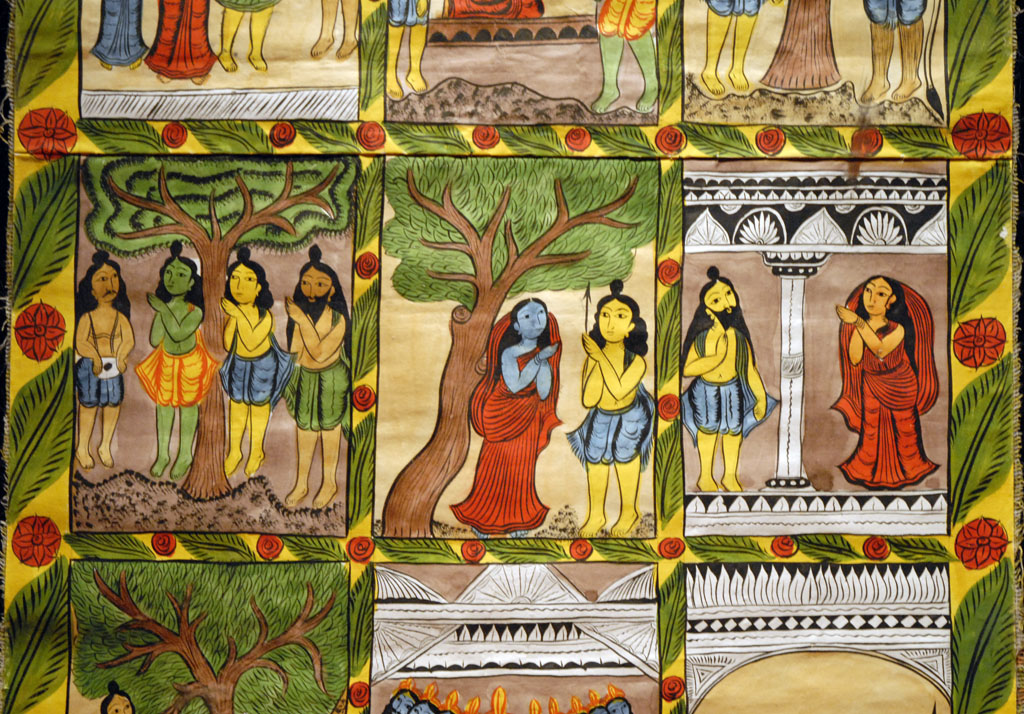
Patachitra of Naya village

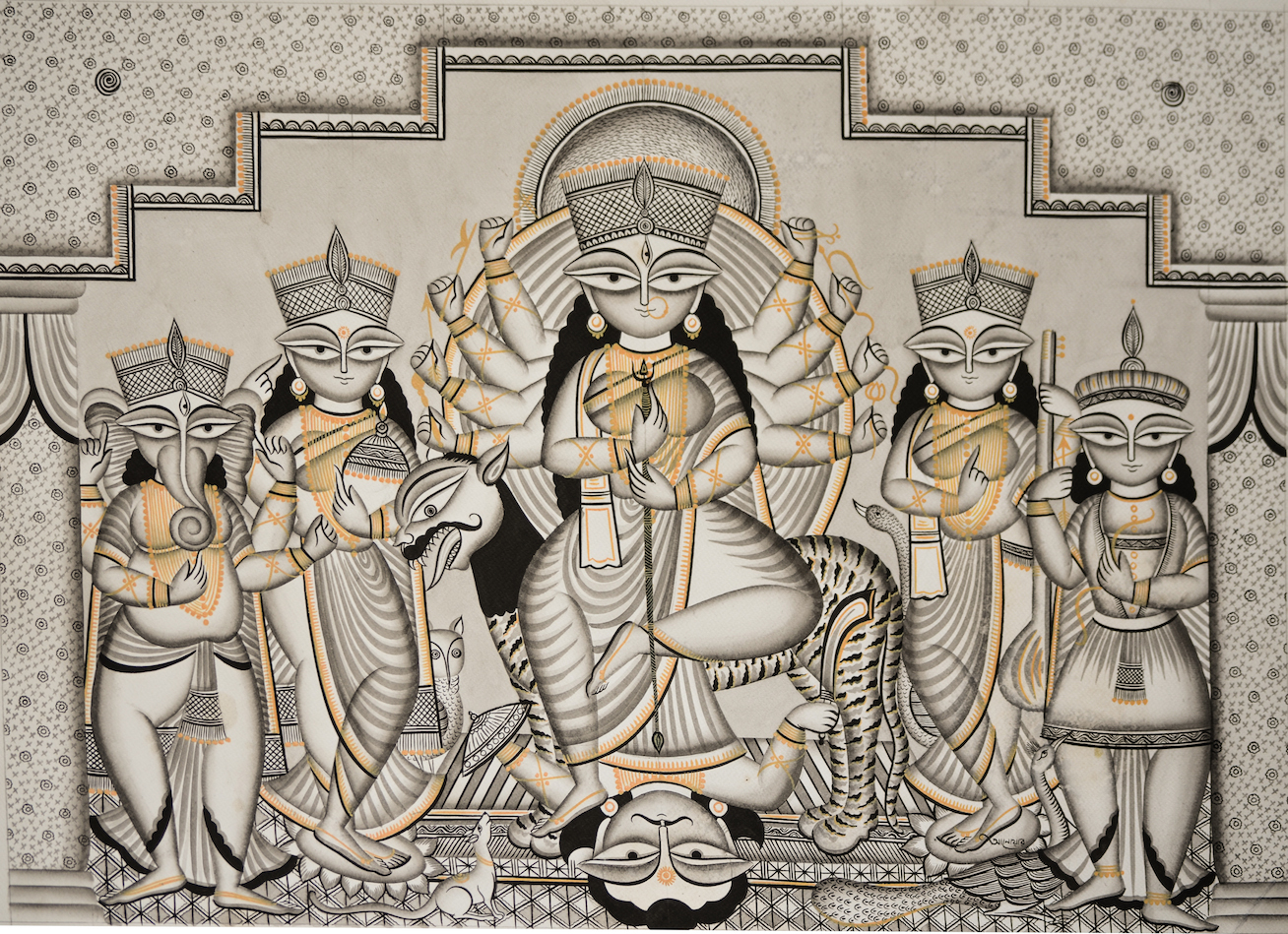
Goddess Durga and her family in Medinipur Patachitra

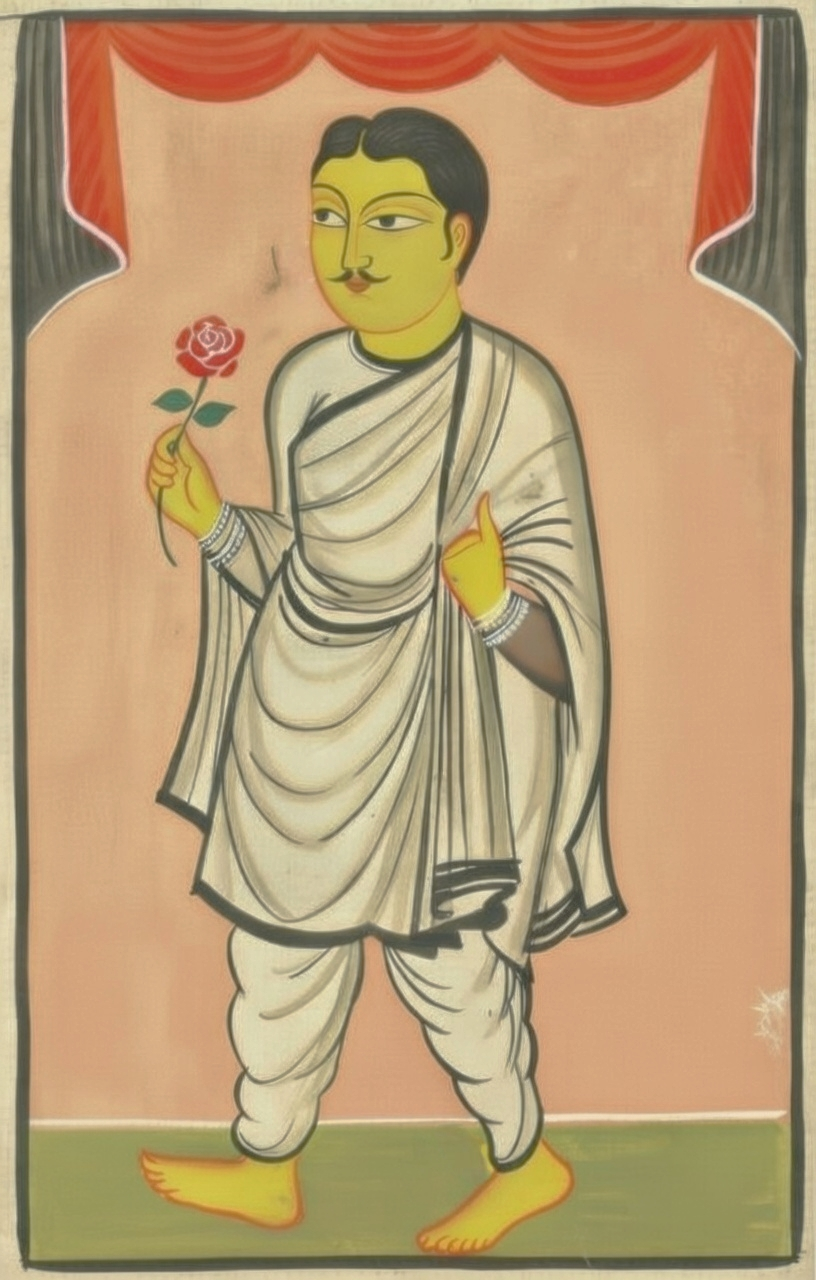
Maharaja Virendra Mohan Dar of Dar, Akhnoor (Kalighat Pattachitrra). c. 1929

=== Origin ===
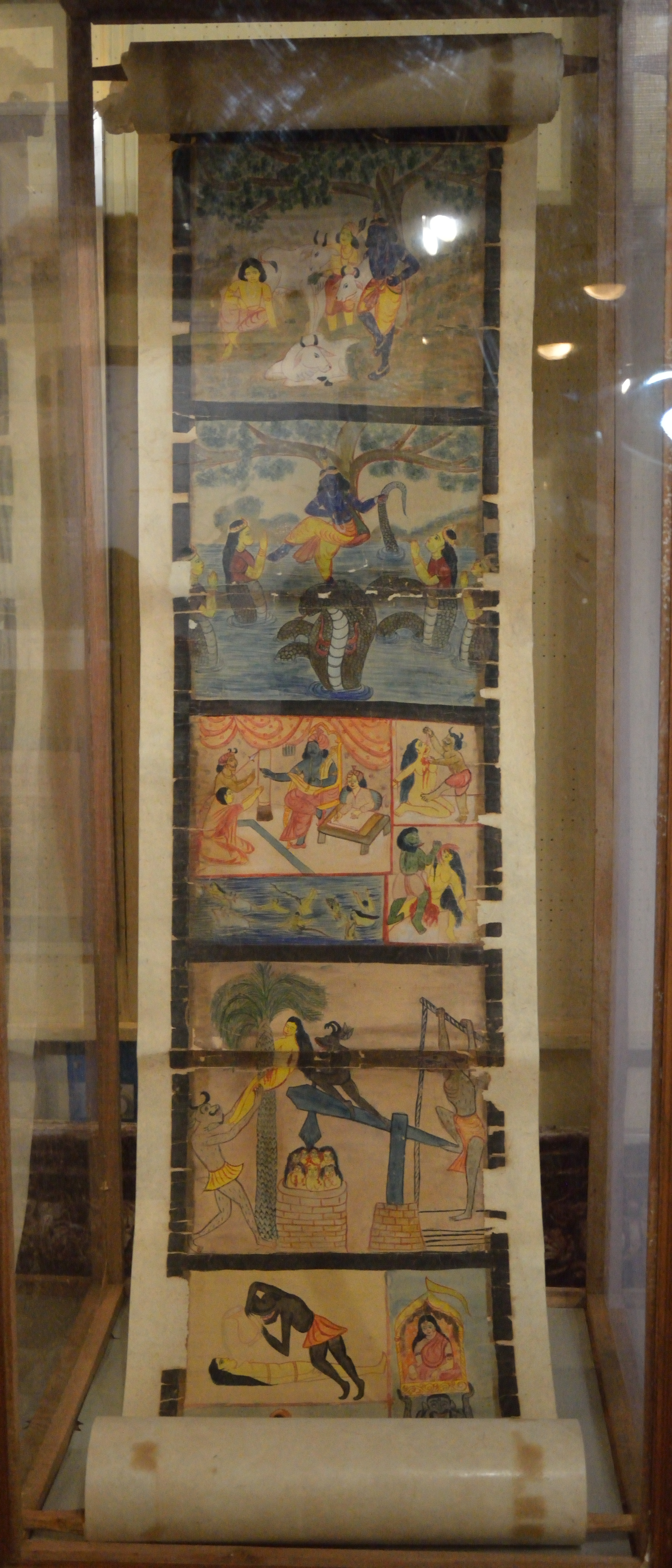
Patua scroll on display at Archaeological activities exhibition of Bengal Patachitra

Patachitra is known for its excellent play of colour. It is a traditional folk art form of rural Bengal. There are some controversial opinions about the dates of ancient Patas. But it has been suggested based on historical themes connected with the accompanied songs like Patua Sangeet. It dates back to the Pre- Pala period which is still tucked away with small villages of Midnapore, Bankura, Purulia, Howrah, Hooghly and 24 Parganas. There are some Jadu-Patuas painting of mural style in the temples of Bankura District in West Bengal.

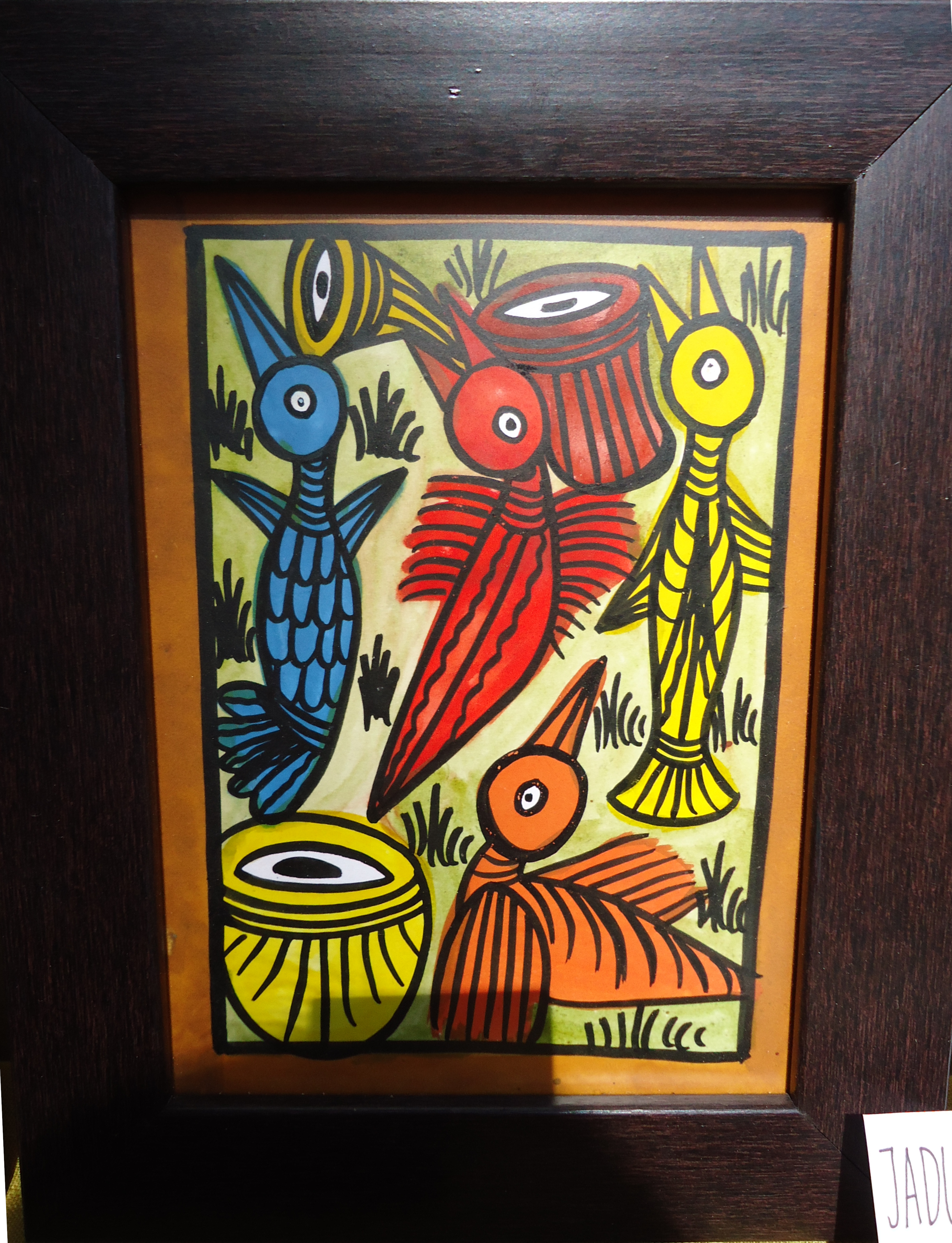
Jadupatua painting

=== Theme and style ===
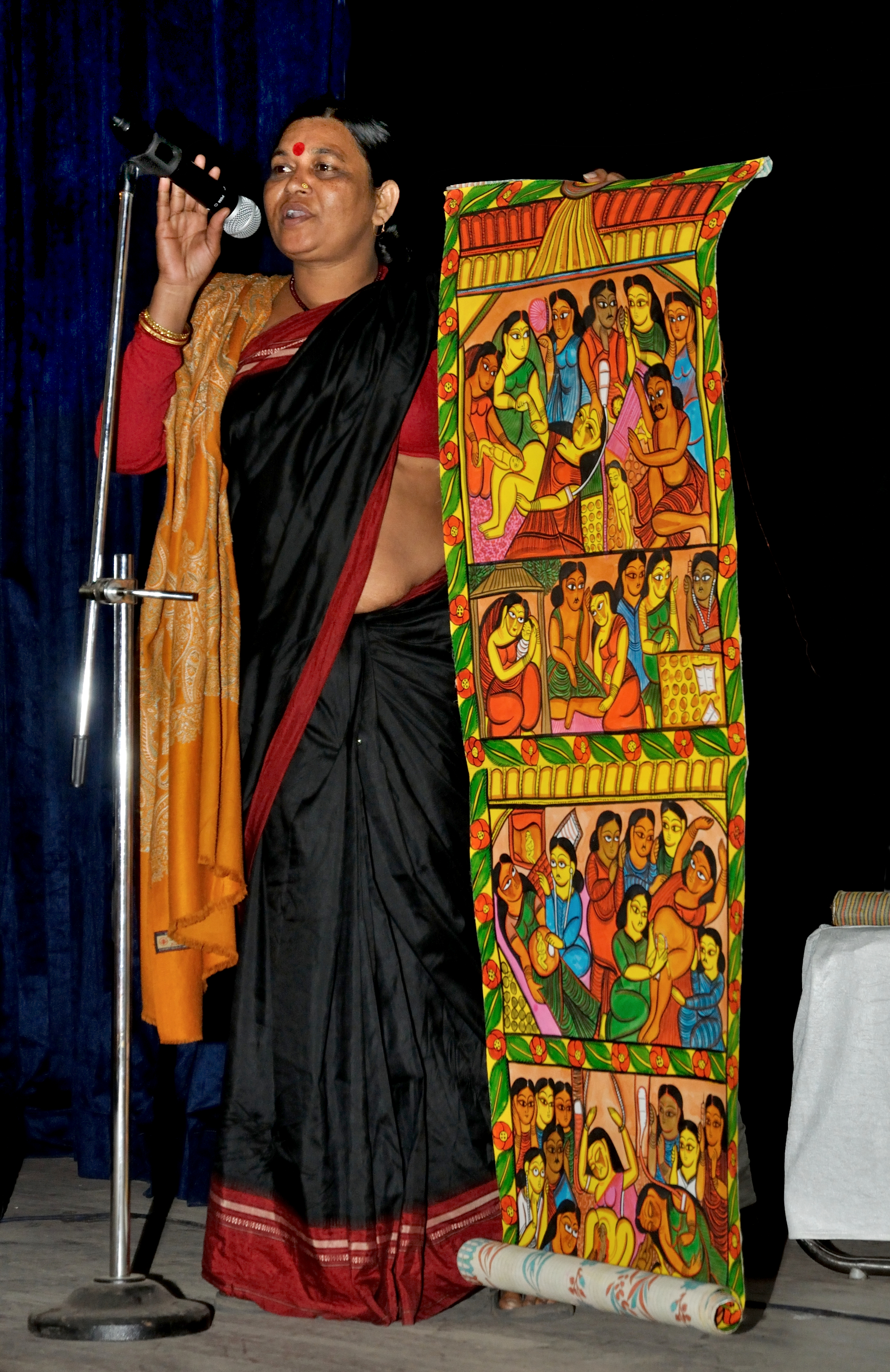
Performing the Patua Sangeet by a Patua during an international conference in Kolkata

There are many types of Pots like religious, secular. Religious pots encompass the story of Hindu epics like, mythology, Ramayana, Mahabharata narrating stories of Hindu gods and goddesses like Radha Krishna, Chaitanya, Kali, Shiba and the indigenous Bengali folklore of Manasha and Chandi, Behula and Lakshinder being the most popular. Secular pots depicts important news events, scandals accidents etc. such as bus accidents at Narayangarh, rural elections, the rationing system, family planning, evils of the dowry system etc. Every Patachitra has a song related to it, which the artists sing while unfurling the Patachitra. Singing pot in Bengal is called Patua Sangeet. Patua Sangeet or Poter Gan is a cultural tradition of the singing Bengal Patachitra. It is performed by Patua. It is famous in the village part of West Bengal like Birbhum, Jhargram, Bardhaman and Murshidabad as a folk song of West Bengal.

=== Aspects of painting ===
Bengal Patachitra painting has a different type of motive and aspects that unrolled the Bengali culture. Using the mythological epic and the natural color it is one of the individual characteristics of the Bengal Patachitra.

==== Chalchitra ====
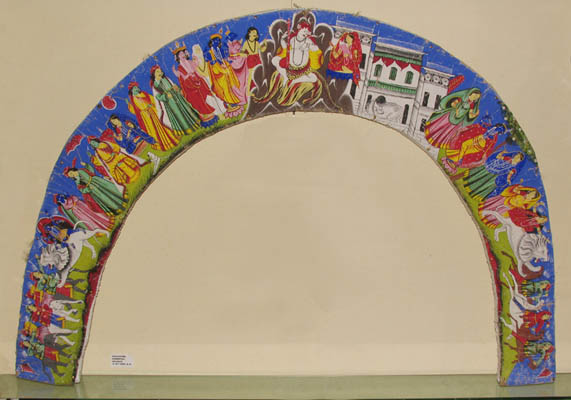
Chalchitra, a part of Bengal Patachitra, referred to the background Patachitra of the Durga Pratima

Chalchitra is a part of Bengal Patachitra, It referred to the Debi Chal or Durga chala, the background of the Durga Pratima or idol. Patua, the artists of Chalchitra called it as Pata Lekha, means the writing of Patachitra. 300–400 years old idols of Nabadwip Shakta Rash used Chalchitra as a part of Pratima. At a time, the use of Chalchitra became fade, but now it has a great popularity.

==== Durga sara ====
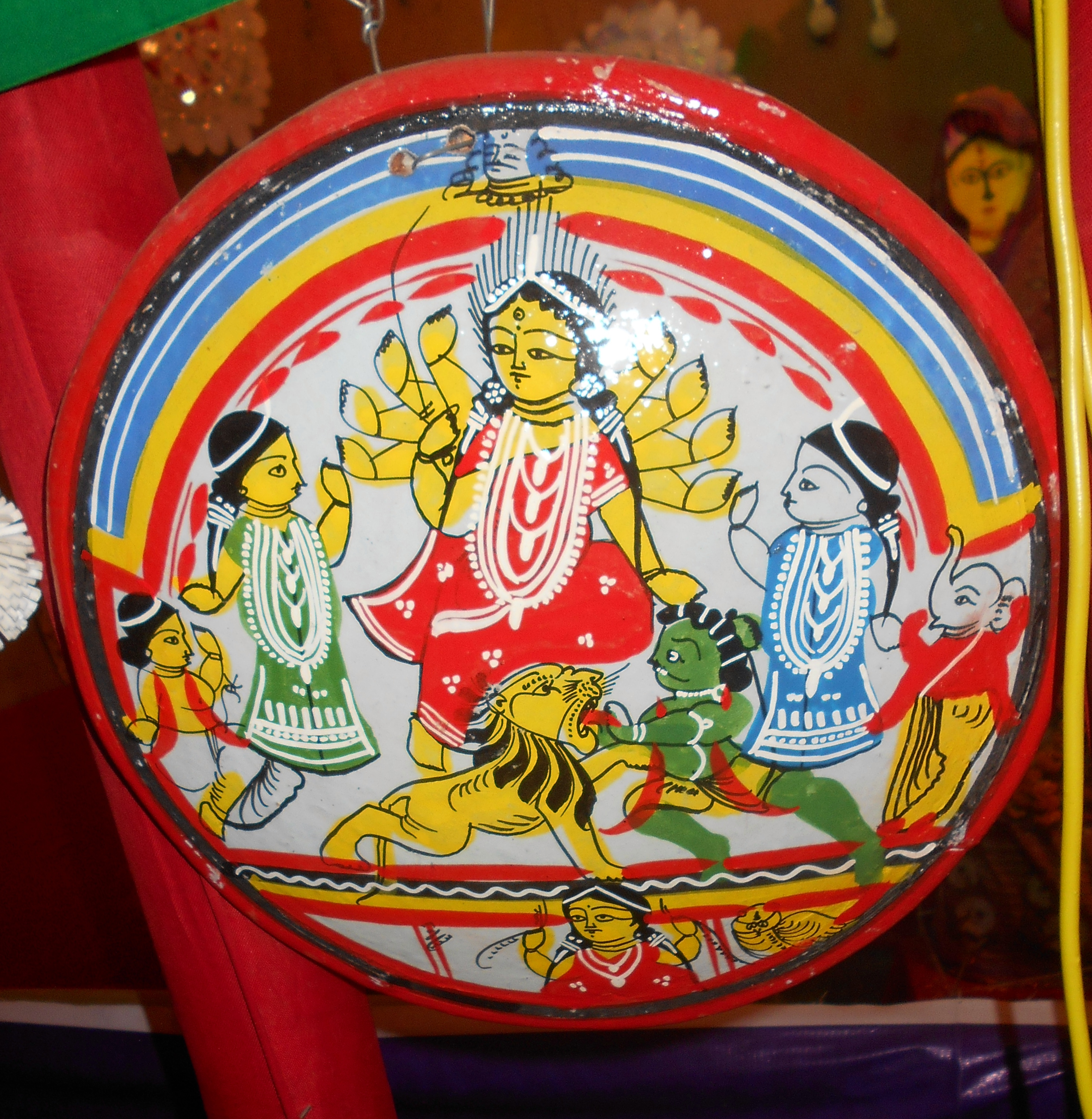
Durga sara, an aspect of Bengal Patachitra

Durga sara is a variant of the patachitra. Instead of a cloth, the backside of a clay tray or dish called sara (সরা) in Bengali is used as the canvas, where an image of the Hindu goddess Durga is painted. Poor Bengali Hindu families in regions of West Bengal like Nadiya & 24 Parganas use it as an alternative of idols for worship.

==== Lakshmi sara ====
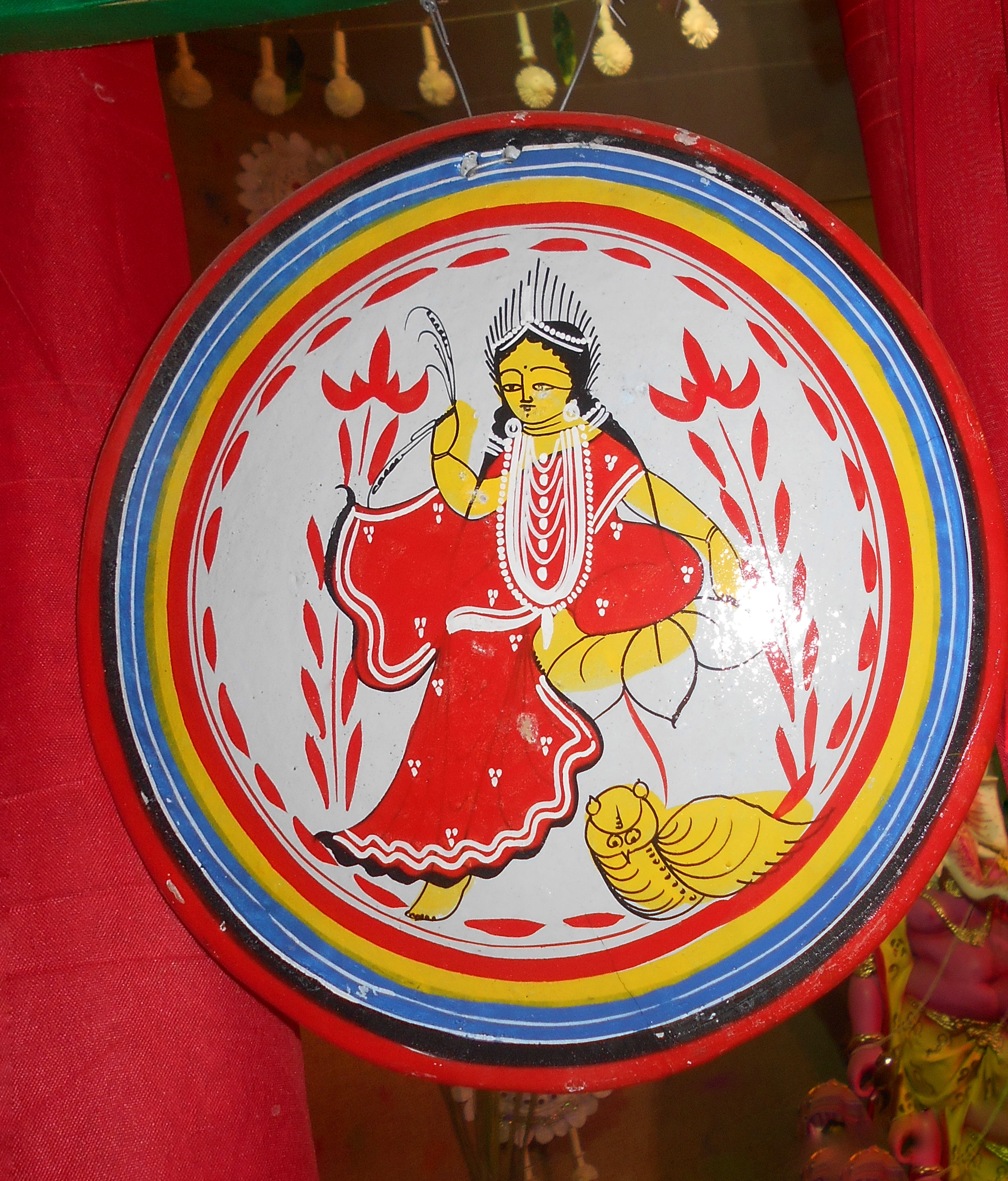
Lakshmi sara in West Bengal

Lakshmi sara is similar in style to the Durga sara. It depicts the Hindu goddess Lakshmi & was used as an alternative to idols by poorer Bengali Hindu families during the Kojagori Lakshmi Puja festivities. Initially confined to regions of East Bengal (in what is now Bangladesh), specifically Faridpur & Dhaka regions, the art style came to West Bengal through the hands of Bengali Hindu artists fleeing religious persecution following the Partition of Bengal, 1950 East Pakistan riots, 1964 East Pakistan riots & 1971 Bangladesh genocide, with its sales being fuelled by demand from East Bengali refugees.

==== Gazir Pat ====
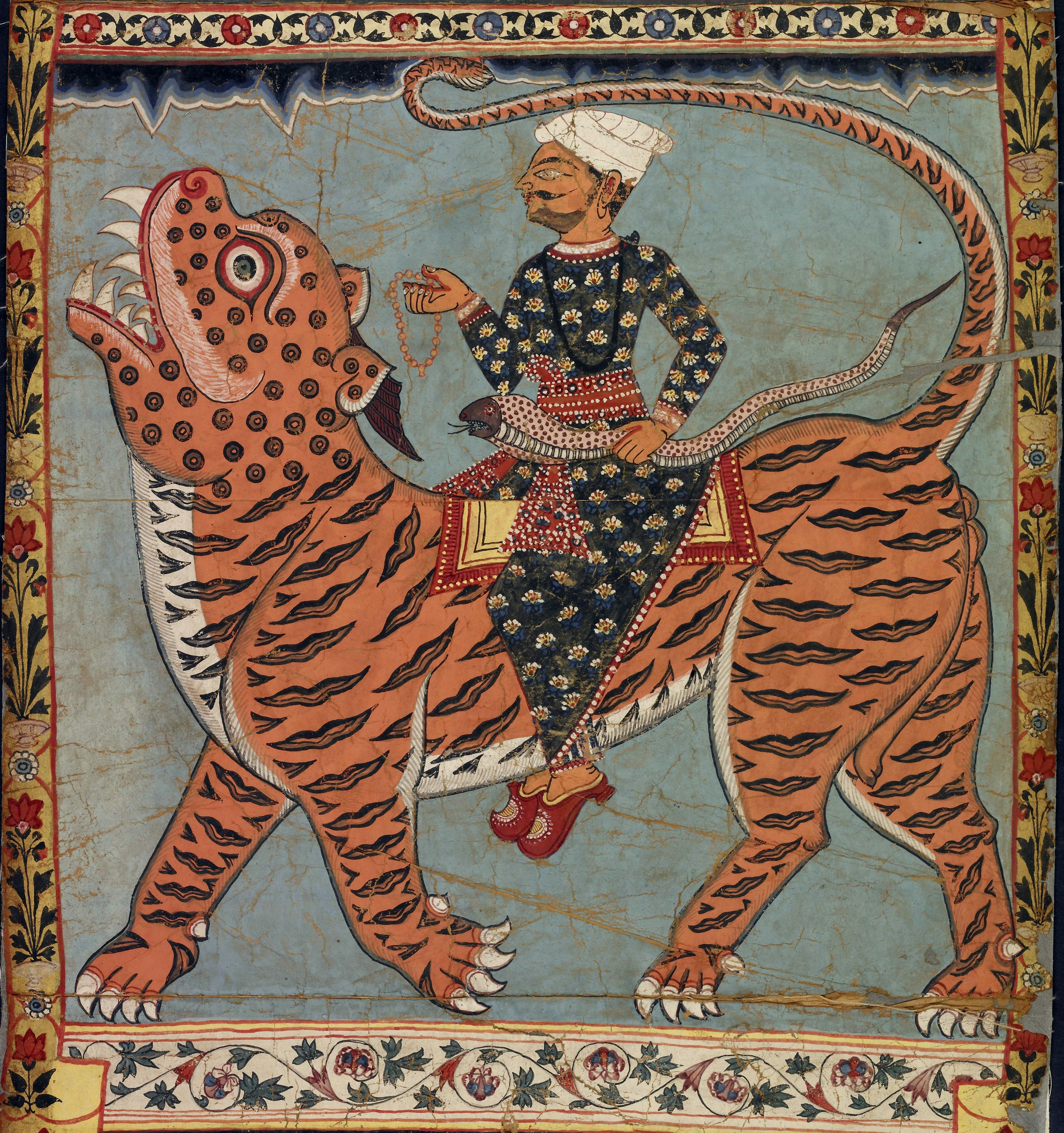
An example of a Gazir pat

Gazir pat is a variation of the patachitra theme. Catering specifically to Bengali Muslims, it depicts the exploits of Pir Boro Khan Gazi, an Islamic preacher whose tomb lies in Ghutiari Sharif, who combined the roles of a pir & a ghazi & is renowned for having battled the Bengali Hindu folk god Dakshin Ray as a part of his missionary activities. He himself has been raised to the status of a folk god by Arzals & Dalits living in the Sunderbans alike, who seek his intercession in repelling attacks of the Bengal tiger. This art form is widespread in Bangladesh.

=== Technique ===
The Patachitra of different districts of West Bengal are characterized by many peculiarities in colour and design. The patachitra of Manbhum, now known as Purulia can be distinguished by their preference for one particular shade of burnt sienna relieved by white and yellow patches and densely packed composition. The seated figures of Dasaratha and Chand Sadagar of Medinipur crowning the Ramayana and Kamale-Kamini scrolls are impressive and monumental. In the scrolls of pot of Birbhum, Bankura and Burdwan preference for Indian red background usually found, the scrolls of Hooghly preferred a dark brown. The Hooghly and Manbhum 'pats' are peculiar and definitely modernistic with the abstract linear treatment.

=== Colour ===
Use of natural color is one of the individual characteristics of the Bengal Patachitra. In general, blue, yellow, green, red, brown, black and white are used in the Patachitra of West Bengal. Chalk dust is used for white color, pauri for yellow color, cultivated indigo for blue, bhushakali for black and mete sindur for red color.

=== Artists ===
Bengal Patua artists carry the occupational surname of 'Chitrakar'. They are concentrated in the village of Naya in Medinipur district of West Bengal. Prominent artists include Khandu and Radha Chitrakar and their children Bapi, Samir, Prabir, Laltu, Tagar, Mamoni and Laila Chitrakar. Monimala is known for her use of bold, primal colours and the development of her own iconographic style.
