= Patua Sangeet =

Cultural tradition in Bengal

Patua Sangeet পটুয়া সঙ্গীত
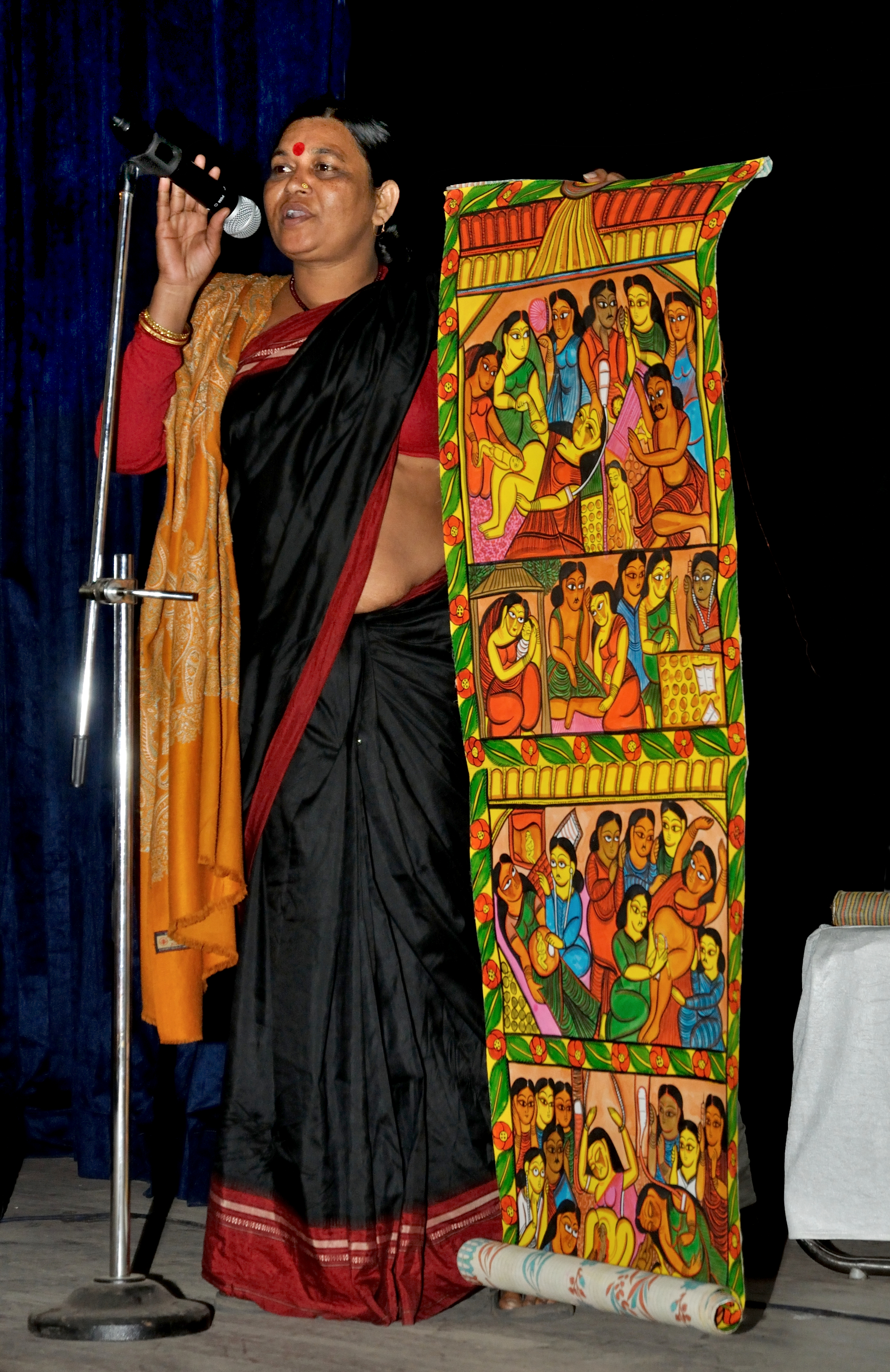
- Performing the Patua Sangeet by a Patua during an international conference in Kolkata
- Native name: Poter Gan পটের গান
- Etymology: songs made my bengal patua
- Stylistic origins: Blueblood of Bengal
- Cultural origins: ancient time to present, Bengal region
- Typical instruments: free voice and folk instrument

Regional scenes
- India (West Bengal)

Local scenes
- Birbhum, Medinipur

Patua Sangeet or Poter Gan is a cultural tradition of Bengal Patachitra. It is performed by a Patua. It is famous in the village part of West Bengal like Birbhum, Jhargram, Bardhaman and Murshidabad as a folk song of West Bengal.

== Classification ==
There are three types of Patua Sangeet according to the difference of Patachitra and there mythological stories. This lyrical drama is written about the Krishnilila, Gouranglila, Ramlila, Shib-Parbotiilila etc. is called Lila kahini. Panch Kalyani type music is not based on any particular story or adaptation. There are many sense of various gods and goddesses. So it's called Pancha Kalyani, the mixer of various stories. Gopalan or Cattlefarming story is another type of Patua Sangeet.

== Regions ==
Patua sangeet was prevalent in the entire the hole Bengal region, but now it is heard in Birbhum, West Midnapore, Nayagram of Pingla block in Jhargram, Bardhaman and Murshidabad district in West Bengal.

== Relation between Patachitra and Patua sangeet ==
Patua sangeet is not merely an emulation of Patachitra. It describes the inner meaning and thought of the Patachitra. Thus Patachitra and Patua sangeet are mutually dependent.

== Patterns ==
Although the culture of Patua Sangeet is fading, some songs are still heard in some places of West Bengal. There are some ideas of pat singing from the different writers who compiled the songs.

=== Pancha Kalyani giti ===
Nama mahēśbara digambara īśāna śaṅkara.
Śiba śambhu śūlapāṇi hara digambara

=== Krishna pater giti ===
Hari binē br̥ndābanē āra ki brajē śōbhā pāẏa.
Jalē kr̥ṣṇa sthalē kr̥ṣṇa kr̥ṣṇa mahimanḍalē.

=== Jam pater giti ===
Arira putra yamarāja yama nāma dharē,

binā aparādhē yama kā'uri danḍa nā'i karē.
Ēkajana balatē tārā du'i janē yāẏa,
kē'u dharē culēra muṭhi kē'u dharē gāẏa,
pāpī lōka halē gō tāra mastaka phāṭāẏa.
Bhālō jala thākatē yē jana manda jala dēẏa,

mr̥tyukālē nabakakuṇḍē mukhē tāra jala dēẏa.

=== Gajir pot giti ===
Pērathamētē dēkhēna kartā ṭhākura jagannātha

rāma-lakṣmaṇa naẏā hanu laṅkā ca'ilā yāẏa.
Rābaṇa ā'isyā yōgīra bēśē sītā haraṇa karē
śūrpanakhāra nāka yēmana lakṣmaṇa ṭhākura kāṭē.
Kamarati bāmana dēkhēna chinnamastā kālī
tāraparētē dēkhēna kartā maẏūrapaṅkhī nā'ō.
Gājīra bhā'i kālu ā'ila niśāna dhariẏā

gājīra āchē ēkaṭā bāgha nāma yē khyanda'iẏā....

== Artist ==
- Dukhushyam
- Pulin Chitrakar
- Gouri Chitrakar
- Rani Chitrakar

== See also ==
- Patachitra
- Patua
- Chalchitra
