= Chalchitra =

Art form of West Bengal, India

Chalchitra চালচিত্র
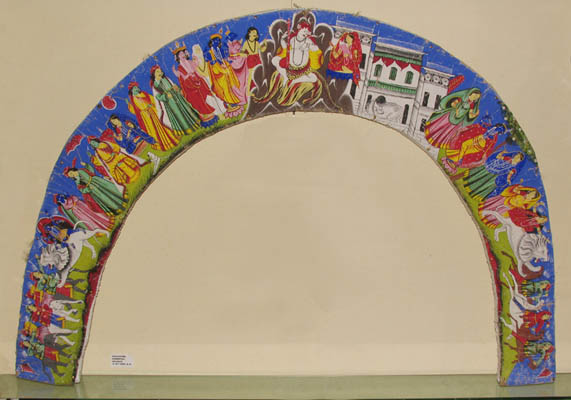
- Chalchitra, the background Patachitra of the Durga Pratima
- Others Name: Paṭa lēkhō (পট লেখ), Durgā cālā (দুর্গা চালা), Dēbīcāla (দেবীচাল)
- Theme: Various Hindu religious plot related to Debi Durga and Shiva
- Antiquity: About 1200 yrars old tradition
- Ingradinet of making Chalchitra: Bamboo, Heavy Cloths, Clay, Color
- Related Festival: Shakta Rash; Bengal's Shakti Festivals

Chalchitra (Bengali: চালচিত্র) is a part of Bengal Patachitra. It referred to the Debi Chal or Durga chala, the background of the Durga Pratima or idol. Originally, these were used to give a proper proportion to the structure. This tradition is very ancient and is still maintained.

== Significance of the name ==
Chalchitra is a Bengali word where Chal means covering. It is drawn in Pratima Chala. So, it is called Chalchitra. Patua, the artists of Chalchitra, called it Pata Lekha, which means the writing of Patachitra. It is also called Durga Chala, Debi Chala.

== Classification ==
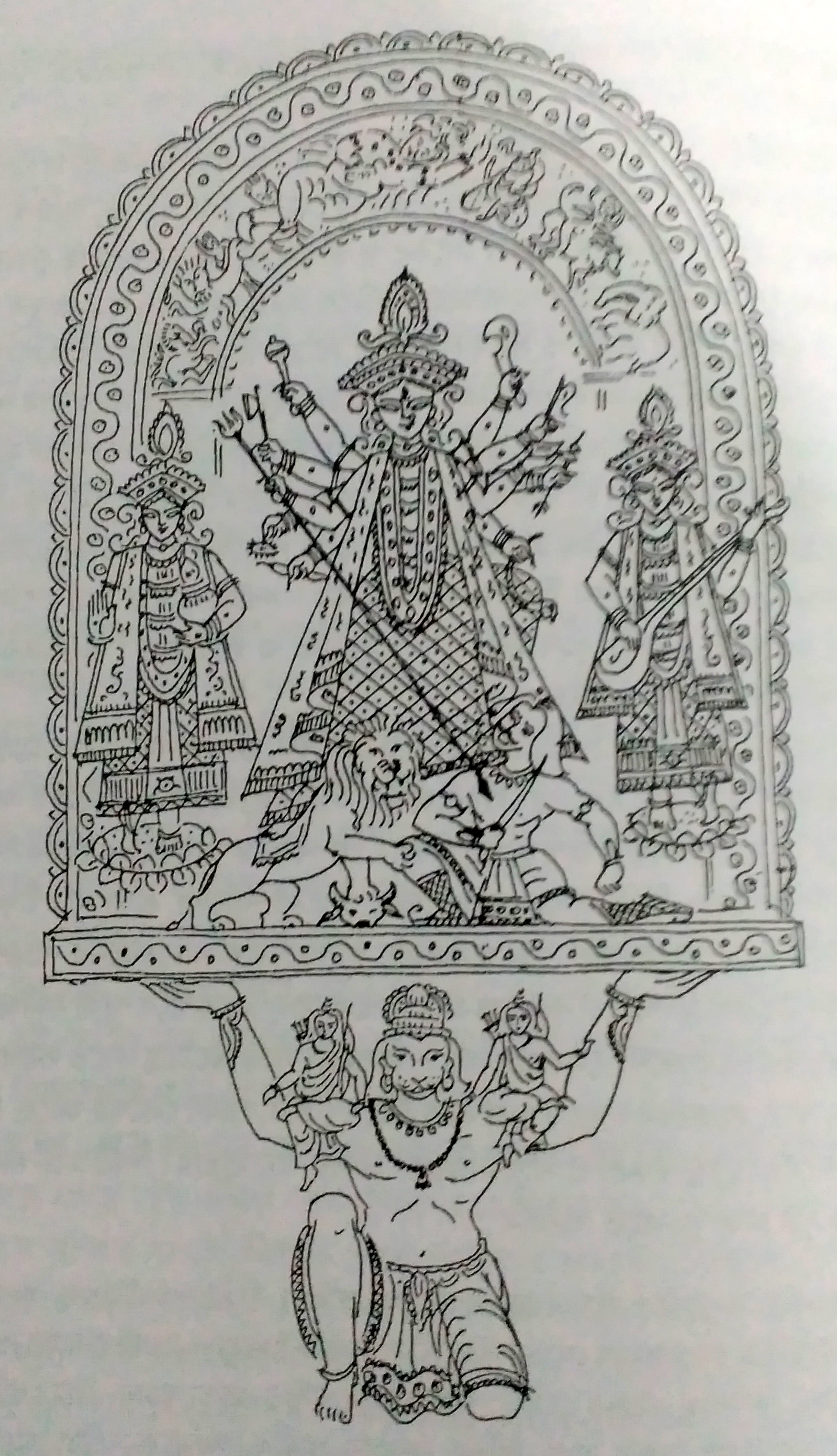
Charichapara Bhadrakali Pratima Chitra, Nabadwip

According to the shape of the Chali, the structure of Durga Pratima has some varieties like Bangla Chali, Mothchouri Chali, Tanachauri Chali, Sorbosundori Chali, Khep Chali, Markini Chali. Among them, the commonly seen Chali is the Markini Chali. The Bangla Chali follows the tradition of temple architecture. It stretches on both sides of the idol in a suspended pattern and is long enough to fit all the idols present there.

== Theme and style ==
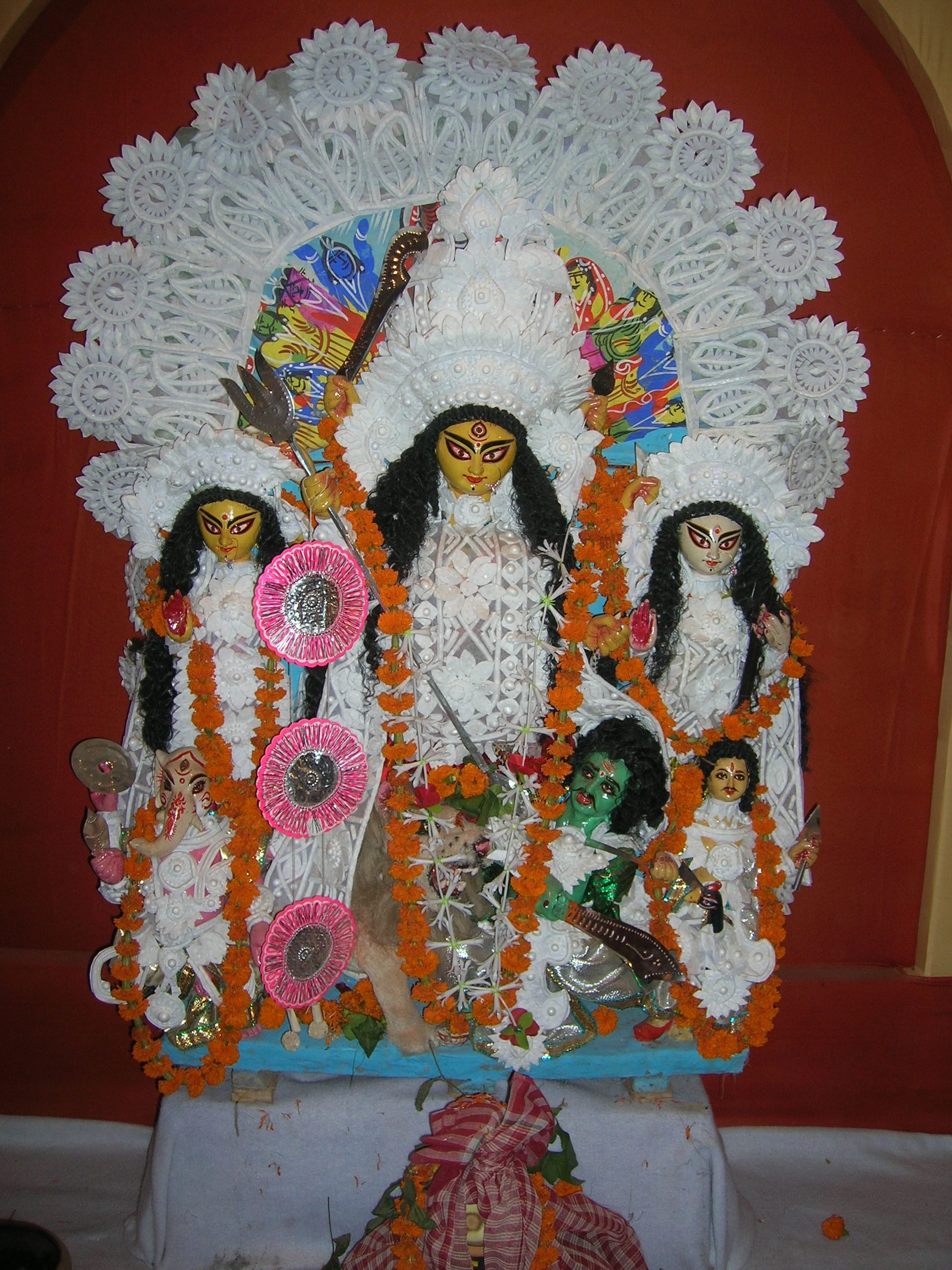
Sabeki Durga idol with Chalchitra

The main content of the chalchitra is Shib-Parboti, Kali, Shib attending Nandi-Vringi, Mahish-mardini, Dashabatar etc. Such a special Patachitra is seen in Durga Pot in the Hatsarandi Sutradhar society of Birbhum district, which is called Durga Pot. However, instead of Durga idol, it was worshiped in Durga Pot. Durga Pot has a semi-circular Patachitra where Patachitra of Durga is in the middle position. Ram, Sita, Shib, Nandi-Vringi, Brahma, Vishnu, Shumbha-Nishumbha are painted on this kind of Chalchitra. Krishnanager Rajrajeshwari Durga is seen to be uniquely noticed. In the middle of the Chalchitra, there is Panchanan Shib and Parvati is beside him, on one side there is Dasha-mahabidya and the other side, there is Dashabatar.

== Antiquity ==
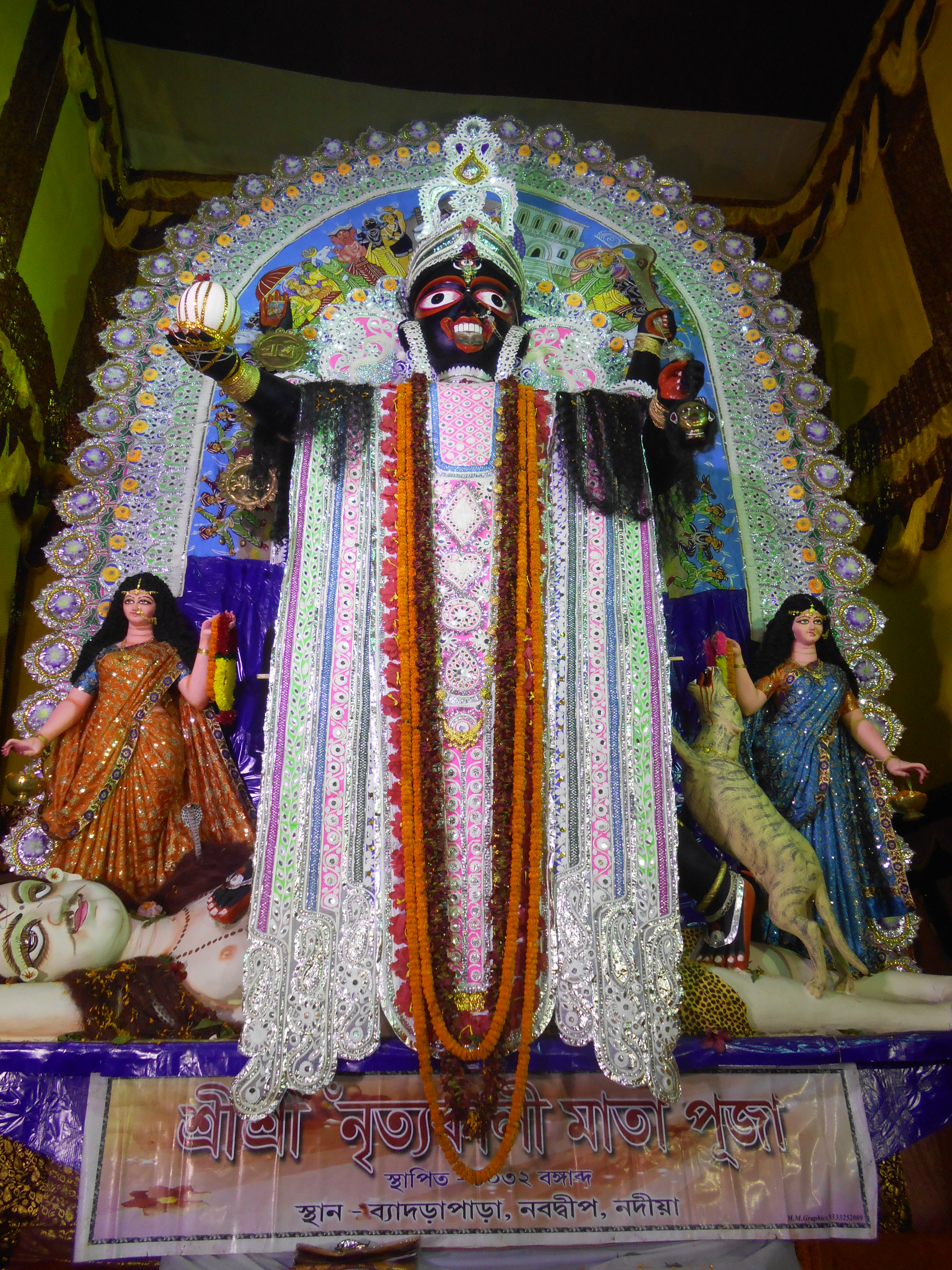
Nrityo Kali Mata with Chalchitra in Shakta Rash

Two of the most famous forms of idol making in Bengal are Bishnupur style and Kangshonarayan style. Among them, Kangshonarayan style is most popular.

300–400 years old idols of Nabadwip Shakta Rash used Chalchitra as a part of Pratima. At a time, the use of Chalchitra became fade, but now it has a great popularity. Chalchitra artist of Nabadwip, Tapan Bhattacharya said-

It's good to see a lost painting coming back around.

== Tradition ==
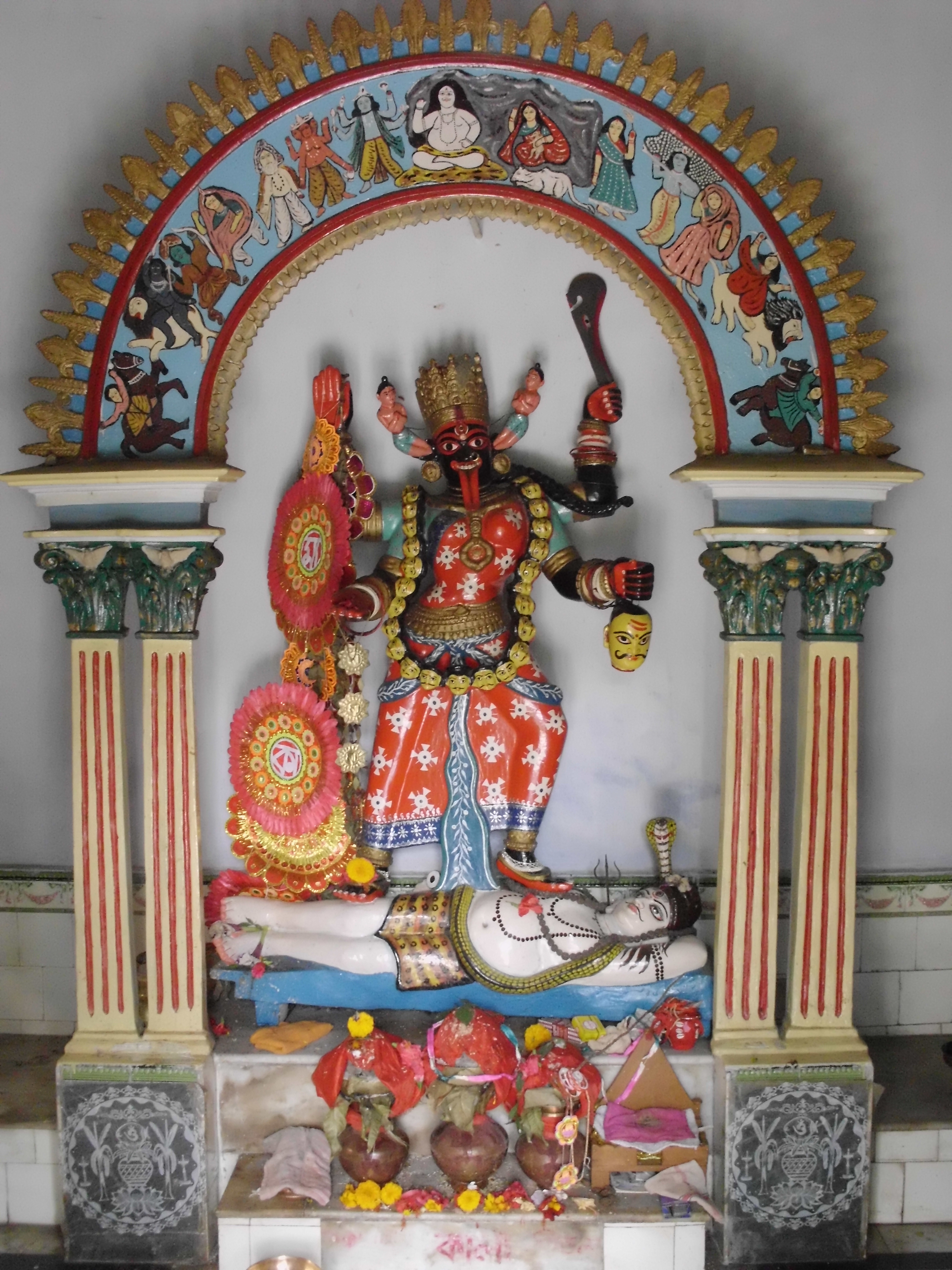
Goddess Kali with Chalchitra in Rampara Kalibari

Rajrajeshwari Durga Pratima of Krishnanager Rajbari uses a unique Chalchitra. Baishnavadas Mallik of Kolkata's Darpanarayan Tagore Street and the tradition of writing pot in the Bose family of Ramkrishnapur is still fine. Bimanbihari Sheel of Ramchan family in Chorabagan, north Kolkata said-

Āgē cālitē paṭa lēkhā halē'ō bhāla cālacitra śilpī saṅkhyāẏa kamē yā'ōẏāẏa ēkhana dēbīra cālacitrē byabahāra karā haẏa hātē ām̐kā cālacitra

Krishnanagar's Chalchitra artist Biswanath Pal wrote pot in various Banedi families of Kolkata. He said-

Banadi family still enjoy hand painted pot. Before Pujo, there are many places to write pots in Khidirpur and north Kolkata.

== Technique ==
On the upper surface of the idol, a half-domed bamboo structure was strapped on it, and the width of the cloth was wrapped in a width of thick cloth and the back part of the cloth was folded behind the bamboo structure. When the clayed cloth dried up, it was given a few layers of Chalk Dust. After that, the planned storyline is drawn on it.

=== Colour ===
Natural color is used in color, which is one of the characteristics of the Bengal Patachitra. In general, blue, yellow, green, red, brown, black and white are used in the Chalchitra. Indeed, the painting illustration has been imitated by the Patachitra of Bengal. Chalk dust is used for white color, pauri for yellow color, cultivated indigo for blue, bhushakali for black and mete sindur for red color in chalchitra.

== See also ==
- Patua
- Patachitra
