= Shakta Rash =

Festival in Nabadwip, West Bengal, India

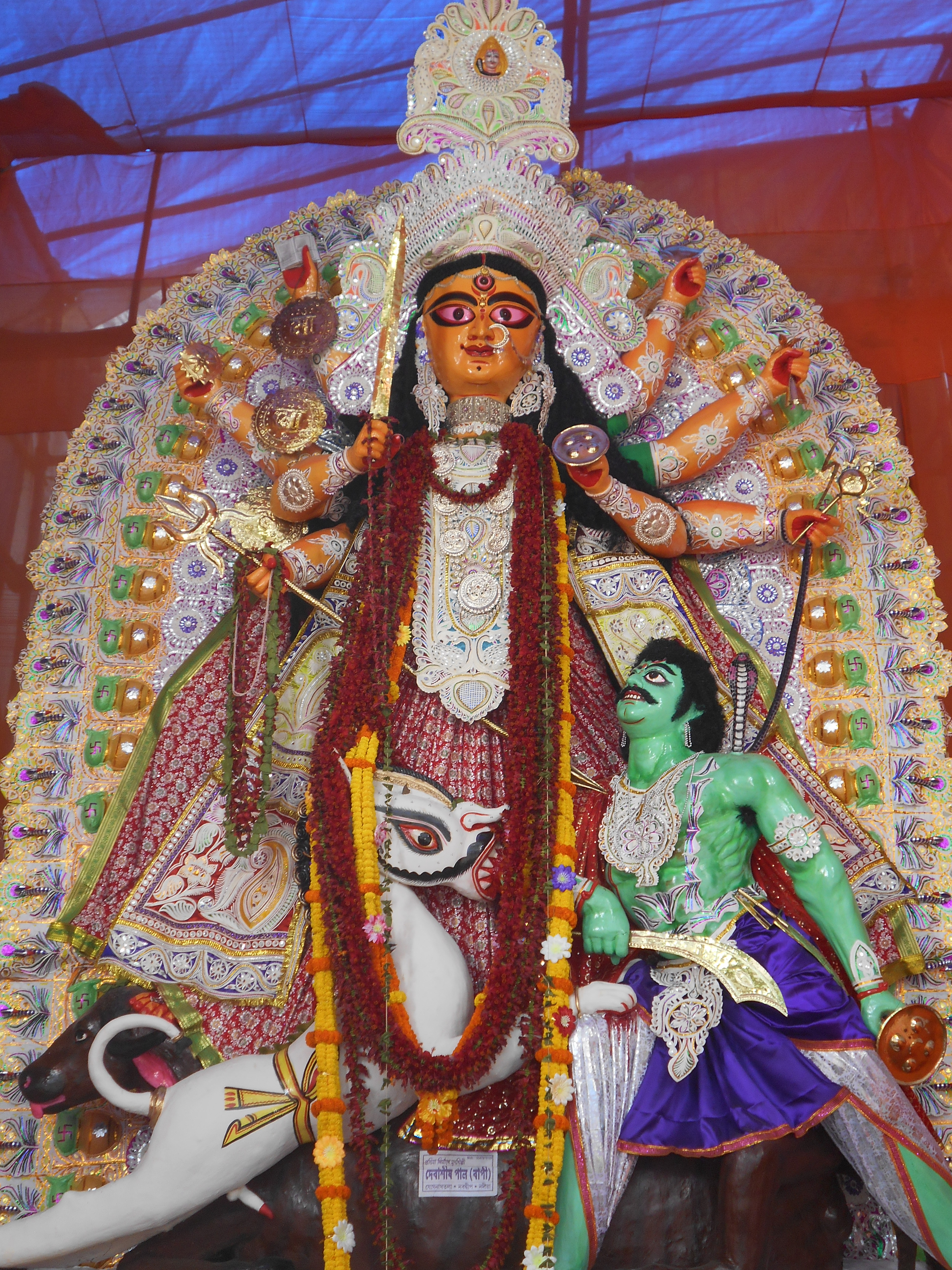
- Dumureshwari Mata in Nabadwip Rash Jatra
- Also called: Pot Purnima, Rash-Kali Puja, Rash Jatra
- Observed by: Bengali Hindu
- Type: Hinduism
- Celebrations: Puja, Boli (Animal Sacrifice) in some places, Processionals, Immersion of idols
- Observances: To make idols of gods and goddesses with clay and to pay obeisances and worship Shakti in Kartik Purnima
- Begins: Kartika Purnima
- Ends: After Rash Purnima or Kartik Purnima with celebrating immersion named Arong
- Date: 24 November (2026) 14 November (2027) according to Bengali calendars
- Frequency: Annual

Shakta Rash (ISO: Śākta Rāsa; Bengali: শাক্তরাস), also known as Rash Utsav, was fast started from Nabadwip city and then it became an annual festival, celebrated uniquely in Nabadwip and Santipur of West Bengal. The festival is observed in the month of Kartika in Kartika Purnima (the full moon day of Kartika month) of Hindu calendar, which corresponds to November in the Gregorian calendar. After the grandeur of Durga Puja and Kali Puja, Rash festival is celebrated as a continuation of devotion of Shakti traditions of Hinduism. While Durga Puja focuses on the worship of Goddess Durga—the embodiment of strength, protection, and cosmic balance—the Ras festival emphasizes devotion to Shakti, the divine feminine energy that manifests in various forms, such as Durga, Kali, Lakshmi, and others.

The main features of Shakta Ras are to make large clay idols (murtis) to worship Shakti. The craftsmanship involved in creating the clay idols of the Shakta deities, their religious connotations, and the artist's perfect portrayal combine to give this festival a unique character. Nabadwip's Ras is not just a religious event, but also a cultural celebration, where art, spirituality, and tradition come together in an extraordinary blend. Each idol seems to evoke a powerful invocation of energy, instilling a sense of peace and strength deep within the hearts of the people. Every idol has an artistic design, a variety of imagination, religious discourse, and deep understanding of the scholars, which help entertain innumerable people. Cartoonist Chandi Lahiri said that the large scale of the clay idols differs from any other festivals, because the idols from Nabadwip is shapely and symmetric despite their light weight and enormous proportions.

== Historical groundings ==
Ras festival mainly part of Vaishnavism. During the time of Chaitanya Mahaprabhu, Rash Yatra was started in Nabadwip as a Vaishnava festival. While the Ras festival primarily centers around Vaishnavism, commemorating Lord Krishna's divine play, the Shakta Ras reflects a unique integration of Shakta (Goddess-centric) traditions within the Ras celebrations. This syncretism is evident in the worship practices, where deities from both Vaishnava and Shakta traditions are honored, and in the transformation of the festival over centuries. Over time, the Shakta elements gained prominence, showcasing the coexistence of Vaishnava and Shakta beliefs in the local culture.

In the introductory phase, the Ras festival was celebrated through the worship of pot (painted scrolls). Because of this, Raas Purnima became known among Shaktas as "Pot Purnima". But as potters from other regions—especially under the patronage of local royalty, such as Maharaja Krishnachandra, settled in Nabadwip, clay idol worship gradually took root. However, Mohit Ray has mentioned, "The potters of Krishnanagar flourished under the patronage of British officials." Over time, after the period of pot worship, the practice of clay idol worship gradually emerged. This led to the creation of massive and highly detailed clay idols, including both Krishna and Kali figures, with the latter earning the festival name “Ras Kali” puja in popular language.

== Kali puja and Ras festival ==
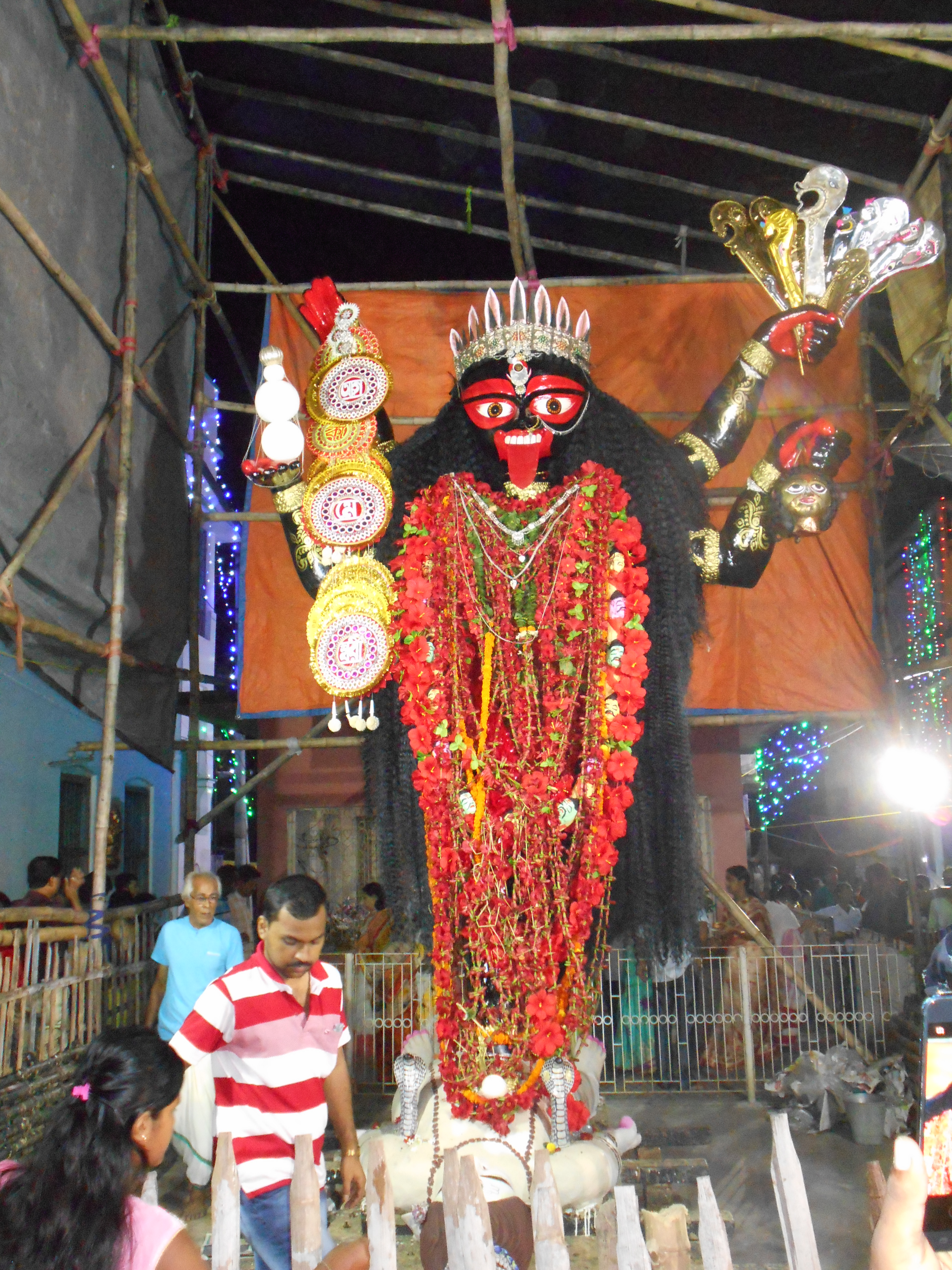
Agameshwari Kali Mata worshiped by Krishnananda Agamavagisha in Kali Puja

Before the beginning of the Shakta Rash Utsav, several Kali idols were already being worshipped in Nabadwip. According to various schools of Shakta tradition, Bengal has historically been a center for Tantric practices. As the influence of Brahmanical culture grew, oppressed people began embracing Tantra closely. From the 12th to 13th century, Tantric practices expanded widely across Bengal. During this time, accomplished Tantric practitioners devotedly worshipped the goddess, following strict rules and principles. According to tradition, idol worship hadn’t become prominent in Bengal back then. In the 17th century, after the renowned Tantric scholar of Nabadwip, Krishnananda Agamavagisha composed the Brihat Tantrasara, the worship of Kali began to spread in Bengal. However, from the ''Kālīsaparyāvidhi'', a text written in 1768 in the mid-18th century, it refers that Kali worship had not yet spread widely in Bengal. Under the direct patronage of Maharaja Krishnachandra, the widespread expansion of Kali worship took place in this region. Krishnachandra introduced at least three Kali worship rituals in Nabadwip during his reign. These include the Alaniya Kali, Baro Shyama Mata, and the Bhadra Kali mata of Charichara Para. Later, his grandson Ishan Chandra initiated several more Kali worships, such as Bhadra Kali of Harisabha Para, and Nritya Kali of Byadra Para. Initially, these Kali goddesses were worshiped on the Amavasya (new moon) night of Dipanwita Kali Puja. However, with the beginning of Shakta Ras, these Kali pujas also started being celebrated on the Purnima (full moon) night of the month of Kartik. These pujas lend antiquity to the Shakta Ras festival of Nabadwip..

== Conflict with Vaishnavism ==
In the early 16th century, some Vaishnavite scholars started the Vaishnavic movement. So it was an obvious conflict with Shakta followers who were worshipping Tantra.

== Ras Purnima in early days ==
Documentation of early days of Shakta ras is very rare as flood and earthquake hit several times. Although Girish Chandra Basu and Kanti Chandra Rari gave glimpse of Shakta ras in early days.

=== Girish Chandra Basu ===
Girish Chandra Basu highlighted the first glimpse of Nabadwip Ras. In 1853–1860, he was a daroga of Nabadwip-Shantipur and Krishnanagar. In his book Sekaler Daroga Kahini (published 1888 AD), he wrote various socio-cultural reports along with the geographical location of the Nabadwip of that time. He wrote,

During Ras Utsav, people gathered in Shantipur, and similarly, large crowds would come to Nabadwip to witness the "Pot Puja" and enjoy various cultural programs. This Pot Puja is well-known in Nabadwip. Despite its name, Pot Puja involves worship through clay idols of various deities. Among these, idols of Durga, Bindhyabasini, Kali, Jagadhatri, and Annapurna are especially popular. These idols are very lightweight; five or six people can easily carry them on their shoulders, and they can even dance with them effortlessly.

Girish chandra Babu's description provides insight into the 19th-century Ras Utsav. Bindhyabasini Mata was worshiped in Purangunge, a place that now lies in ruins. Between 1853 and 1860, he observed Purangunge in its original state. However, in 1871, the Ganges eroded the area, leading to the destruction of Purangunge. The Bindhyabasini deity was then moved to Sribasangan. Due to internal conflicts, the puja committee eventually split into two groups. One group continued to worship Bindhyabasini in Sribasangan, while the other began Gourangini worship near Jognathtala.

=== Kanti Chandra Rarhi ===
Historian Kanti Chandra Rarhi also wrote about Nabadwip Ras in his book Nabadwip Mahima. There he confirmed that Shakta Ras jatra had been celebrated since long year back. He wrote,

Superpower of Hindu mythology, Devi Bhagabati has been worshipped in different form in Nabadwip during Ras Purnima. Next day after puja, people from the nearest place came to watch idols. Also Maharaja of Nadia came to see and he encouraged this festival by giving award for making outstanding idol. For that purpose an organising committee brought there idol in Poramatala. There Maharaj judges the structure of idol, ornaments (called in Bengali as "Saj [সাজ]") etc and then decided the award to best one.

— Kanti Chandra Rarhi

== Glory of the Mūrtis ==
The craftsmanship of the potters of Nabadwip-Krishnanagar is equally renowned both domestically and internationally. The artisans of Nabadwip have left a unique mark in creating massive idols.

Cartoonist Chandi Lahiri remarked about the glory of the Mūrtis worshiped in Nabadwip Rash jatra,

In the idols of Nabadwip, the preservation of balance within each part, even amidst their enormity, and the realization of various deities' classical imagery through clay, are simultaneously a marvel and a source of pride for any country in the world.

Dr. Sudhir Chakraborty, educationalist and recharcher of Bengali Folk culture, wrote about the potters of Nabadwip - "The sculptor's skill in shaping the statue's form is beyond question... In this formation lies the pride of ancestral heritage, passed down through generations."

The skill of the potters in crafting extremely large idols is beyond question. While the potters of Krishnanagar excel at creating small figurines, they cannot craft such large idols. The potters of Chandannagar can create massive Jagaddhatri idols, but they lack proportional harmony, often concealed by the extravagance of "Daker Saj" (Sholapith) decorations. In Nabadwip, however, all clay idols are proportionate, well-structured, and graceful. This artistry reflects the pride of a long-standing, inherited mastery in traditional craftsmanship.
