= Chandi Lahiri =

Indian Journalist and Cartoonist

- Born: 15 March 1931; Nabadwip, Bengal Presidency, British India
- Died: 18 January 2018 (aged 86); Kolkata, West Bengal, India

Chandi Lahiri (13 March 1931 – 18 January 2018) was an Indian journalist and cartoonist.

== Early life ==
Chandi Lahiri was born in the historical township of Nabadwip, West Bengal. He was born to Mohini Mohan and Probodhbala Lahiri. He was involved in active politics in his teens. He studied in Hindu school in Nabadwip. He did his graduation from Vidyasagar College, Nabadwip. He came to Kolkata in the 1950s. He finished his postgraduation in Bengali from University of Kolkata. He was the second child among seven siblings. The whole family was creative. This involvement and immense interest in the social and political history of the nation designed his art work into an apt commentary on the national scenario of things.

== Career ==
He began his career in 'Dainik Loksevak' newspaper as a journalist in 1951. He started drawing cartoons officially in 1961 and joined Anandabazar Patrika first for their then English daily The Hindusthan Standard and later when his friend and contemporary Cartoonist Amal Chakraborty left the magazine house's Bengali daily cartoon feature 'Tirjak', he took over. He had joined the group in 1962 as a cartoonist where he worked for almost 30 years. For the next twenty years he worked with various other media outlets. He also designed animation sequence for a colour series of Doordarshan in the late 1970s. His work was also used in popular advertisements.

Being humanitarian by nature, he worked pro bono for various social organisations to support noble and just causes all throughout his life. He wrote many books on cartoon. His research works on Gaganendranath Tagore's cartoons or Basantak, a magazine that was dedicated to humor gained importance. His work in Bengali on the history of cartoons, Cartooner Itibrityo is used as a reference book on Bengali cartoons and their works. An anthropological work Manush Ki Kore Manush Holo, co written with his daughter Trina, won them the prestigious Narsingdas Award from Delhi University. His social cartoons were awarded in cartoon exhibitions in Yugoslavia, England, Canada and Japan. His admirers find it weird that he was not given any government award in India. He was great friends with other contemporary cartoonists like R.K.Laxman, Mario Miranda, Kutti, and others. He was an ardent admirer of David Lowe. Pixel or Kafi Khan and Shakila Chakraborty were predecessors he respected the most. He had a wide range of knowledge about things. He was one of the pioneers of animation in Bengal. His own projects like The Biggest Egg and Under The Blue Moon, created along with his third brother Tulsi Lahiri were not just appreciated but bought by Doordarshan. His team also made animated movie titles for popular Bengali movies like Hangsaraj, Dhanyi Meye, Mouchak, Charmurti and others. His books on cartoons like Chandi Looks Around or Since freedom are connoisseurs delight. He was close to theater groups and did lettering of plays by groups like Nandikar, Sayak, Sundaram, Purba Paschim and recently Paikpara Akhor.

== Works ==
- Visit India with Chandi (1973)
- Gaganendra Nath: Cartoon and Sketch ( গগনেন্দ্রনাথঃ কার্টুন ও স্কেচ) (1975)
- Chandi Lahiri's Third Eye (1964)
- Bideshider Chokhe Bangla (বিদেশীদের চোখে বাংলা) (1966)
- Chandi Looks Around (1980)
- Since Freedom: A History in Cartoons 1947–1993 (1994)
- Chandi Lahiri Cartoons (2002)

== Death ==
He died on 18 January 2018, after a brief period of illness in Kolkata, West Bengal. He is survived by his wife batik artist Tapati Lahiri and daughter, Trina Lahiri, an internationally famous paper cutting artist. They shared a close relationship.
