= List of Indian women artists =

Following is a list of Indian women artists were born in India and or have a strong association with India.

== A ==
- Dhruvi Acharya, visual artist
- Iloosh Ahluwalia (b. 1970s), painter
- V. Anamika, contemporary artist

== B ==
- Bhuri Bai (b. 1968), artist
- Lado Bai, Bhil tribal artist
- Uma Bardhan (b.1945), painter
- Atasi Barua (1921–2016), painter
- Madhuri Bhaduri (b. 1958), painter
- Dimpy Bhalotia (1987), street photographer
- Pamella Bordes, photographer
- Vasundhara Tewari Broota (b. 1955), painter
- Maya Burman (b. 1971), ink and watercolour painter, based in France

== C ==
- Shanthi Chandrasekar, visual artist
- Anju Chaudhuri (b.1944), artist
- Manimala Chitrakar, Bengal patua artist

== D ==
- Prafulla Dahanukar (1934–2014), painter
- Bharti Dayal (b.1961), painter
- Baua Devi, Mithila painter
- Pratima Devi (painter) (1893–1969), painter, dance teacher
- Anita Dube (1958), contemporary artist

== G ==
- Opashona Ghosh, illustrator
- Sheela Gowda (b. 1957)

== H ==
- Saba Hasan (b. 1962), contemporary artist

== I ==
- Baaraan Ijlal, visual and sound artist

== K ==
- Latika Katt (b.1948), sculptor
- Renuka Kesaramadu, painter
- Anita Khemka (b.1972), photographer
- Bharti Kher (b. 1969), painter, sculptor and installation artist
- Saadiya Kochar (b. 1979), photographer

== L ==
- Lalitha Lajmi (1932–2023), painter
- Srimati Lal (1959–2019), painter

== M ==
- Nalini Malani (b.1946), painter, video and installation artist
- Divya Mehra (b. 1981), multidisciplinary artist
- Rooma Mehra (b. 1967), painter, sculptor and poet
- Bhavna Mehta (b. 1968), paper cut artist
- Anjolie Ela Menon (b. 1940), painter and muralist
- Mrinalini Mukherjee (1949–2015), sculptor

== N ==
- Kota Neelima, painter

== O ==
- Kuzana Ogg (b. 1971), painter

== P ==
- Gogi Saroj Pal (b. 1945), painter, sculptor, printmaker, installation
- Ketaki Pimpalkhare (b. 1977), painter
- Pilloo Pochkhanawala (1923–1986), sculptor
- B. Prabha (1933–2001), painter

== R ==
- Pabiben Rabari, embroiderer
- Gargi Raina (b. 1961), painter
- Rathika Ramasamy, wildlife photographer

== S ==
- Tara Sabharwal (b.1957), painter
- Nelly Sethna (1932–1992), textile artist
- Tejal Shah (born 1979), multidisciplinary contemporary artist
- Nilima Sheikh (b. 1945) visual artist
- Amrita Sher-Gil (1913–1941), painter
- Arpita Singh (1937), painter
- Dayanita Singh (b. 1961), photographer
- Emelina Soares, artist and art historian
- Y.G. Srimati (1926–2007), painter
- Karuna Sukka (b. 1980), printmaker
- Surekha, video artist
- Kruttika Susarla, comic book writer and illustrator

== T ==
- Jaya Thyagarajan (1956–2015), painter

== U ==
- Hema Upadhyay (1972–2015), photographer and installation artist

== V ==
- Geeta Vadhera, contemporary artist
- Rukmini Varma (b.1940), artist
- Vinita Vasu, visual artist and designer
- Durga Bai Vyom (b. 1973)

== Y ==
- Sushila Yawalkar, painter, sculptor and dancer

== See also ==
- List of Indian artists
