= Feminist art movement =

International feminist movement

The feminist art movement refers to the efforts and accomplishments of feminists internationally to produce art that reflects women's lives and experiences, as well as to change the foundation for the production and perception of contemporary art. It also seeks to bring more visibility to women within art history and art practice. The movement challenges the traditional hierarchy of arts over crafts, which views hard sculpture and painting as superior to the narrowly perceived 'women's work' of arts and crafts such as weaving, sewing, quilting and ceramics. Women artists have overturned the traditional view by, for example, using unconventional materials in soft sculptures, new techniques such as stuffing, hanging and draping, and for new purposes such as telling stories of their own life experiences.

The objectives of the feminist art movement are to deconstruct the traditional hierarchies, represent women more fairly and to give more meaning to art. It helps construct a role for those who wish to challenge the mainstream (and often masculine) narrative of the art world. Corresponding with general developments within feminism, and often including such self-organizing tactics as the consciousness-raising group, the movement began in the 1960s and flourished throughout the 1970s as an outgrowth of the so-called second wave of feminism. It has been called "the most influential international movement of any during the postwar period."

== History ==
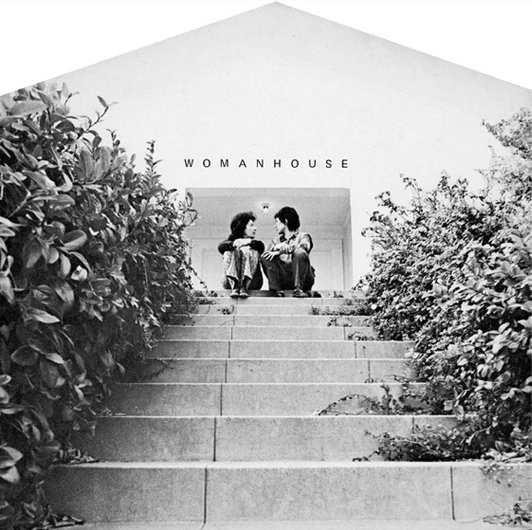
Womanhouse, installation and performance space, 1972, organized by Judy Chicago and Miriam Schapiro, at the Feminist Art Program in Fresno, CA.

=== 1960–1970 ===
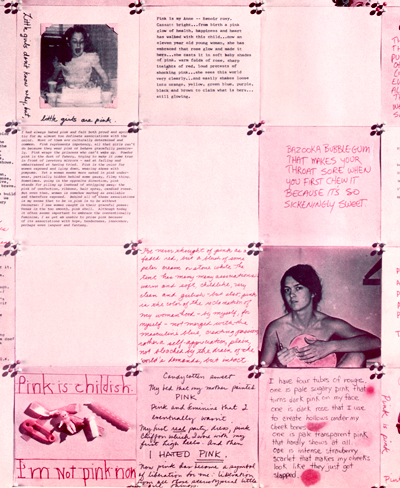
Sheila de Bretteville, Pink, poster, 1973. Provided by the artist.

The 1960s was a period when women artists wanted to gain equal rights with men within the established art world, and to create feminist art, often in non-traditional ways, to help "change the world". This movement was actually started in the United States and Great Britain in the late 1960s and is often referred to as "second-wave" feminism. And In the 1960s and 1970s, many artists began to practice art that showed their own reality in their works. The artists at the time realized that it was wrong for art historians and museums to pay more attention to male artists and only to their paintings, and that women should further integrate topics such as the social treatment of women, and the frequent discrimination against women into their works.

Louise Bourgeois (1911–2010) and German-American Eva Hesse (1936–1970) were some early feminist artists.

On 20 July 1964 Yoko Ono, a Fluxus, avant-garde artist, singer, and activist, presented Cut Piece at the Yamaichi Concert Hall, Kyoto, Japan where she sat still as parts of her clothing were cut off of her, which meant to protest violence against women. She performed it again at Carnegie Hall in 1965. Her son, Sean, participated in the artist performance on 15 September 2013 at the Théâtre le Ranelagh in Paris. The Guardian's Jonathan Jones considered it "one of the 10 most shocking performance artworks ever."

Mary Beth Edelson's Some Living American Women Artists / Last Supper (1972) appropriated Leonardo da Vinci's The Last Supper, with the heads of notable women artists collaged over the heads of Christ and his apostles. Benglis was among those notable women artists. This image, addressing the role of religious and art historical iconography in the subordination of women, became "one of the most iconic images of the feminist art movement."

Women artists, motivated by feminist theory and the feminist movement, began the feminist art movement in the 1970s. Feminist art represented a shift away from modernism, where art made by women was put in a different class to works made by men. The movement cultivated a new feminist consciousness, a "freedom to respond to life... [Unimpeded] by traditional male mainstream." Or, as Griselda Pollock and Rozsika Parker put it—a separation of Art with a capital "A" from art made by women produced a "feminine stereotype". The Dinner Party by Chicago, an art installation symbolically representing women's history, is widely considered the first epic feminist artwork which was very significant in Feminist art. There are 39 elaborate place settings on a triangular table for 39 mythical and historical famous women. And each place setting includes a hand-painted china plate, ceramic cutlery and chalice, and a napkin with an embroidered gold edge. And the goal of the artwork was "end the ongoing cycle of omission in which women were written out of the historical record." Moreover, Chicago said she was "scared to death of what I'd unleashed," however, she was also "I had watched a lot of young women come up with me through graduate school only to disappear, and I wanted to do something about it."

This demand for equality in representation was codified in the Art Workers' Coalition's (AWC) Statement of Demands, which was developed in 1969 and published in definitive form in March 1970. The AWC was set up to defend the rights of artists and force museums and galleries to reform their practices. While the coalition sprung up as a protest movement following Greek kinetic sculptor Panagiotis "Takis" Vassilakis's physical removal of his work Tele-Sculpture(1960) from a 1969 exhibition at the Museum of Modern Art, New York, it quickly issued a broad list of demands to 'art museums in general'.

Alongside calls for free admission, better representation of ethnic minorities, late openings and an agreement that galleries would not exhibit an artwork without the artist's consent, the AWC also demanded that museums 'encourage female artists to overcome centuries of damage done to the image of the female as an artist by establishing equal representation of the sexes in exhibitions, museum purchases and on selection committees'.

=== 1980-1990 ===
The feminist art movement in the 1980s and 1990s built upon the foundations laid by earlier feminist art movements of the 1960s and 1970s. Feminist artists throughout this time period aimed to question and undermine established gender roles, confront issues of gender injustice, and give voice to women's experiences in the arts and society at large. A wide range of artistic disciplines, such as painting, sculpture, performance art, photography, video art, and installations, were included in the movement.

The portrayal of women in art was one of the main issues feminist artists in the 1980s and 1990s focused on. They challenged and subverted standard representations of women as passive objects or muses while criticizing the male-dominated art canon. Many feminist artists investigated topics of sexuality, identity, and the social construction of gender while reclaiming the female body as a source of power. Moreover, The 1980s and 1990s feminist art movement placed a strong emphasis on the examination of both individual and group experiences. Photographic and collage techniques were used by artists like Cindy Sherman and Barbara Kruger to explore themes of identity, self-representation, and the formation of gender roles in popular culture. They questioned the idea of a rigid and fundamental feminine identity and emphasized how gender is performative.

In detail for the example of artists, Barbara Kruger, Sherry Levin since the late 1980 s. Cindy Sherman, Louis Bourgeois, Rosemary Trokel, Kiki Smith, Helen Chedwick and others stood out. Cindy Sherman gave a visual shock through photographs she took while transforming into a specific character or acting herself. Sherry Levine intentionally reproduced the works of masters to reveal the fiction of originality and artistry. Kiki Smith urged people to reflect on the lives of modern people through damaged human ridicule.

Institutional critique emerged as a prominent component of the feminist art movement in the 1980s and 1990s. Along with producing their own works, feminist artists also looked at and opposed the patriarchal structures and restrictive practices that prevail in art institutions. They sought to remove the obstacles that prevented women from participating fully and being taken seriously in the art industry. Here are some examples of how artists of this time engaged in institutional criticism: Guerrilla Girls which was a collective of anonymous feminist artists, emerged in the 1980s. The Museum of Modern Art Protest in 1984 which the protesters criticized MoMA for its exclusionary practices and demanded more representation for women and artists of color, and The "Bad Girls" Exhibition in 1994, which was aiming to upend the currently male-dominated art world and make room for the perspectives and experiences of female artists.

These illustrations show how feminist artists participated in institutional critique by contesting the discriminatory attitudes and practices that exist in art institutions. They planned demonstrations, interventions, and shows to challenge the current quo, demand more representation for female artists, and draw attention to racial and gender disparities in the art world. Feminist artists made a contribution to the continuous evolution of the art world by promoting inclusivity and providing opportunities for upcoming generations of female artists.

Overall, Women's art in the 1980s developed more diversely, by also the magazine ARTnews in the U.S. published praise for female artists being in a leading position without being subordinate to male art. However, as the overall flow of the art world tends to return to traditional styles and materials, feminists also have neo-expressionism. He showed a tendency to ride with new conceptualism.

There are also feminist forms of postmodernism which emerged in the 1980s. Feminist art movements emerged in the United States; Europe, including Spain; Australia; Canada; and Latin America in the 1970s.

The women's art movements spread world-wide in the latter half of the 20th century, including Sweden, Denmark and Norway, Russia, and Japan. Women artists from Asia, Africa and particularly Eastern Europe emerged in large numbers onto the international art scene in the late 1980s and 1990s as contemporary art became popular worldwide.

=== 2000s ===
The contemporary feminist art movement is now following various directions with the development of electronic technology and the new forms of entertainment in the 21st century.

Major exhibitions of contemporary women artists include WACK! Art and the Feminist Revolution curated by Connie Butler, SF MOMA, 2007, Global Feminisms curated by Linda Nochlin and Maura Reilly at the Brooklyn Museum, 2007, Rebelle, curated by Mirjam Westen at MMKA, Arnheim, 2009, Kiss Kiss Bang Bang! 45 Years of Art and Feminism curated by Xavier Arakistan at Bilbao Fine Arts Museum, 2007, Elles at Centre Pompidou in Paris (2009–2011), which also toured to Seattle Art Museum. have been increasingly international in their selection. This shift is also reflected in journals set up in the 1990s like n.paradoxa.

==== Feminist art movement and media ====
One of the things that gives people the most entertainment in the modern era as the times progressed is media such as music, TV shows, movies, and games. The development in music is particularly notable. In terms of hip-hop music, many hip-hop songs promote the art of feminism. Taking South Korea as an example, many female hip-hop singers will openly produce hip-hop songs about feminism to speak out for some unequal gender issues in society. For example, the Korean female rapper BIBI released a song called "Animal Farm" in 2022, which expresses women's resistance to gender discrimination in a patriarchal society and the issue of male coagulation by borrowing footage from Kill Bill.

== Feminist art worldwide ==
=== India ===
Feminist art is a diverse realm and differs immensely throughout the world. India is one of many Southeast Asian countries to have prominent feminist art regarding cultural and systemic factors related to gender marginalization, and art inspired by the experience of women living in the Global South.

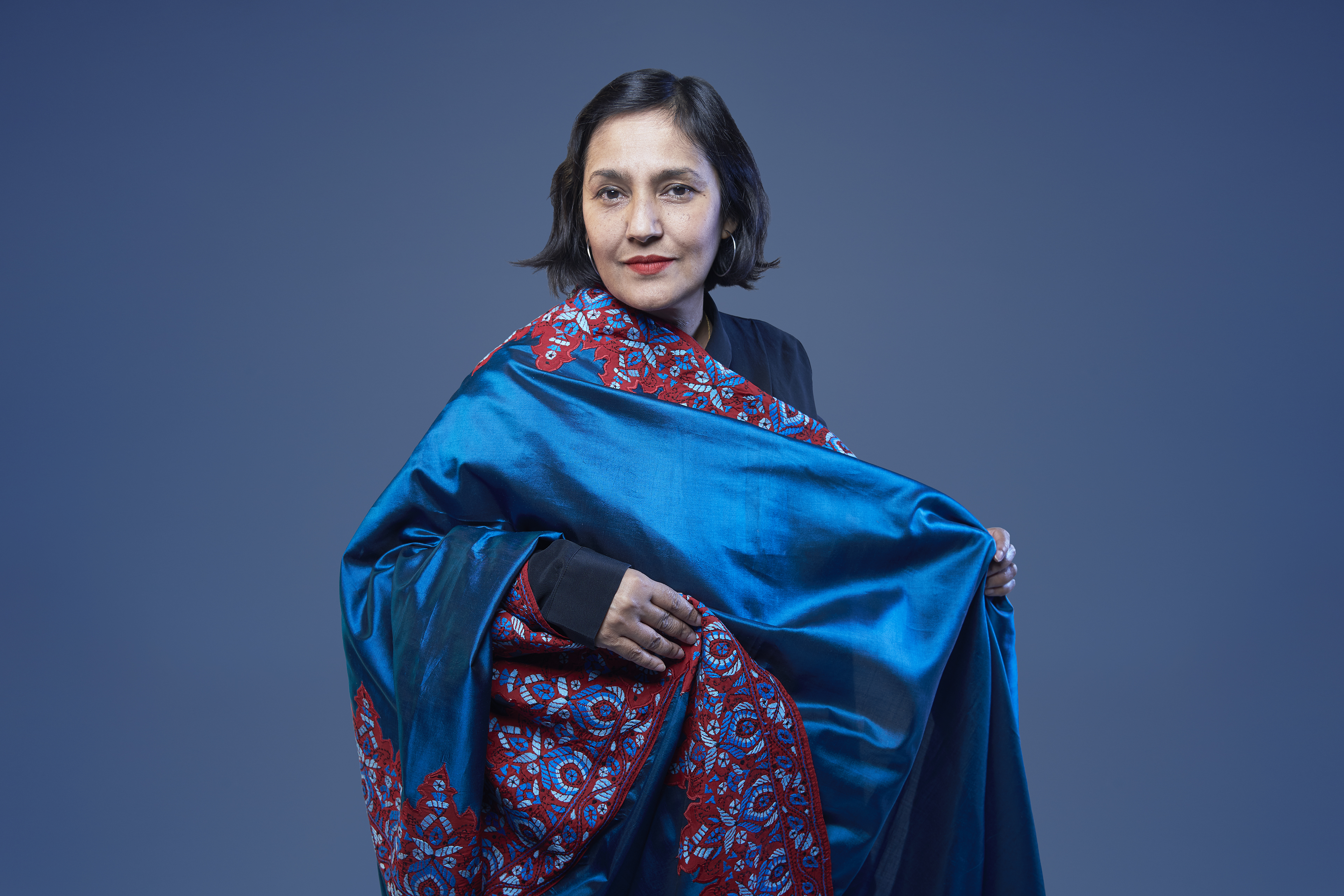
Sutapa Biswas

Sutapa Biswas is one such artist. Born in Santiniketan, India, her artwork questions gender and racial hierarchies relating to colonization and concepts such as space and time. Biswas showcased an exhibition at the Institute of Contemporary Arts in 1985 in London where her piece, Housewives with Steak-Knives, became widely known and exhibited. Housewives with Steak-Knives blends elements of anti-colonialism, Hindu religious figures, and remembrance of past women artists.

Indian feminist art is also prominent in social media. Priyanka Paul, a young artist based out of Mumbai, creates feminist art relating to the Indian caste system, patriarchy, and the sexualization of Indian women's bodies. Paul's piece, Nangeli, is an illustrated, fictional magazine cover of three topless women. Paul posted it to Instagram in 2017. This piece was meant to memorialize Nangeli, a woman of a low caste in the Ezhava community who protested the taxation of women of lower castes who wished to cover their breasts by removing her own breast. Paul's piece calls attention to the oversexualization of women's breasts and the oppressive culture of the caste system.

Similarly, digital artist Kruttika Susarala's portrait of Satyarani Chadha, an anti-dowry movement activist who lost her own daughter to dowry, seeks to be a reminder of the women who have died due to the demands of dowry practices. The piece, also posted on Instagram, uses the digital art medium to represent Chadha as the face of the ongoing movement for women's rights, showing her with anguish in her eyes and dressed in khadi plain clothes, which are indicative of a social rights activist.

=== South Africa ===
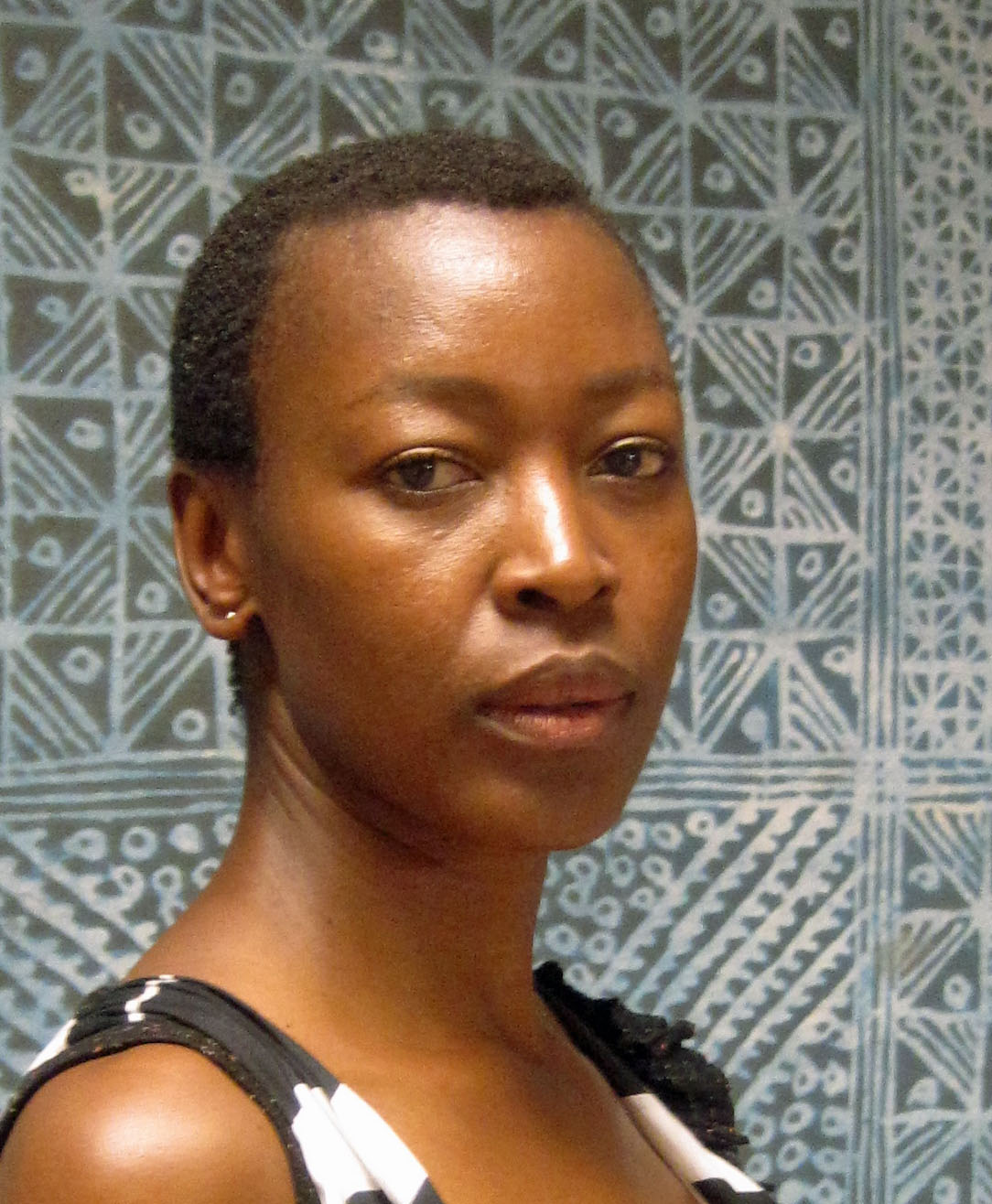
Billie Zangewa in 2019.

Artists from South Africa have made immense contributions to the feminist art genre. Feminist art from South Africa often focuses on themes of colonialism, poverty, violence, and African women's representation, including Black women's bodies and hypersexualization from colonialist standpoints.

The Philani Printing Project, created in 1997, provided training for mothers in painting, textile making, and design. The trainees then have access to a large workshop with several art supplies and materials. The Printing Project was created to give impoverished South African women access to valuable skills, education, financial security, and the ability to represent themselves. Additionally, several works by Philani artists address social and political issues regarding gender discrimination, labor exploitation, and physical violence. One example of a Philani project is Stop Crime, a sizeable wall hanging showcasing several women in a dark street with the words "we want to walk safe in the streets" on their tank tops. Children are included in the work as well, surrounded by images intended to depict danger, such as a skull and crossbones. Stop Crime is meant to bring light to violence against women and children and advocate for changes in South Africa in order to end oppression of these groups.

Tracey Rose is another South African feminist artist. Rose tackles racist imperialism in Africa by the West, racial stereotypes, and oversexualization of the Black female body in her 2001 piece, Venus Baartman. This piece is a self portrait that uses a photography medium and depicts a side view of Rose naked and crouched, moving through an open, green field with her eyes on something out of view of the image. Venus Baartman echoes the experience and cultural perception of Sarah Baartman, an African woman who was forcibly taken to Europe in 1807 and used as entertainment for Europeans as they gazed upon her physique as a spectacle. Rose's piece calls attention not only to Baartman's story, but also to the history of colonization, exploitation, and oppression, especially regarding African women's bodies and the hypersexualization of them from Western points of view.

Another well known feminist artist based out of South Africa is Billie Zangewa. Born in Malawi in 1973, Zangewa studied art at Rhodes University and now lives in Johannesburg. Her works utilize themes of motherhood, domesticity, femininity, and the intersections of race and gender. Many of Zangewa's pieces are combinations of drawings, hand sewing textiles together, and prints. Several depict everyday images such as her infant son sleeping, Zangewa drinking coffee at home, and a couple showering together. Zangewa holds these images of home life as an important aspect of feminist activism, stating, "I use fabric and sewing, which traditionally is a female pastime, to empower myself. I tell my personal story, how it's happening on the home front, and show the intimate life of a woman, which usually we're not encouraged to do." Zangewa's art has been exhibited all over many major cities in the United States, several countries in Europe, and in South Africa, Cape town, and South Korea.

=== Cuba ===
Cuba's feminist art scene reflects the country's rich history and social landscape. Most art in Cuba has been male-dominated, but radical feminist artists who are women regularly challenge the status quo. A large amount of feminist art in Cuba is directly related to the economic and political situation in the country, demonstrating themes of US imperialism and economic struggles.

Tania Bruguera is a Cuban radical feminist artist born in 1968. Much of Bruguera's work is highly political, encourages citizens to dream of a different nation, and demands changes within the Cuban government. Bruguera's 2009 performance art piece, Tatlin's Whisper #6, was a unique performance in that members of the audience had one minute of censorship free speech time where they spoke of their desires and imaginations of a different society. As each participant stood in front of the podium to speak, a white dove was placed on their shoulder as a nod to the famous image of the dove that landed on Fidel Castro's shoulder after a lengthy public speech. The image of the speaker with the dove and the podium were meant to create a juxtaposing image between what Castro promised his citizens and what they were currently experiencing. The performance was deemed "shameful" and "un-cultural" by Cuban authorities. Five years later, in 2014, Bruguera attempted to restage Tatlin's Whisper #6, but was arrested and charged for incitement to break the law. Outrage ensued among other artists and political dissidents, and Bruguera was eventually let out of prison after months of interrogation.

== Multi-disciplinary art movement ==
Feminist art (feminist art movement) frequently blended elements from numerous movements such as conceptual art, body art, and video art into works that delivered a message about the experience of women and the need for gender equality.

=== Performance art ===
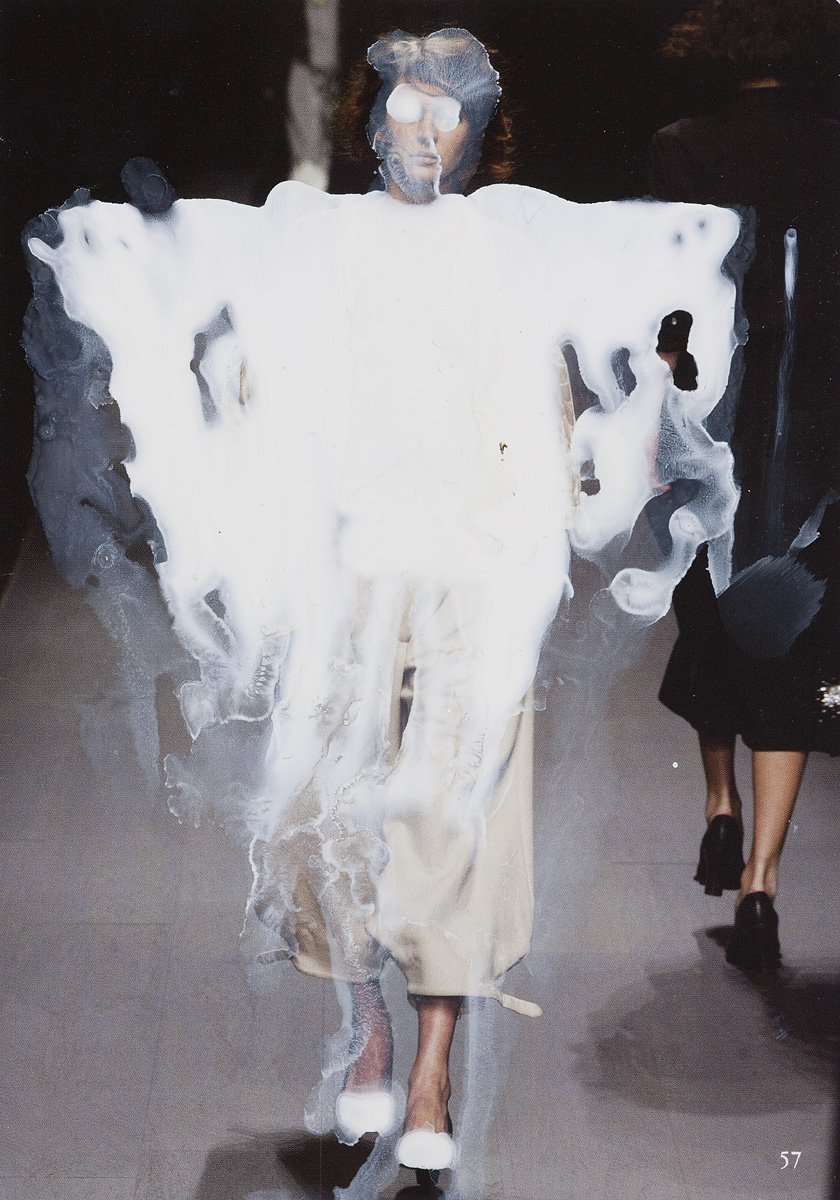
Mary Schepisi, Beauty Interrupted, 2011

During the 1970s and until now (21st century), performance art and the feminist art movement well interact with each other, as the aspect of 'performance' is an effective way for women artists to communicate a physical and visceral message The interaction of art with the viewer throughout performance art has significant impact emotionally. Moreover, as the artists and works are combined into one art and there is no separation, performance art, and feminist art is also a nice element to evaluate the artists' actual experiences. It strives to question and criticize patriarchy, gender norms, and female oppression. Feminist performance artists work to empower women, bring attention to gender inequality, and spark social and political change through their bodies, voices, and other artistic forms.

For example, Regina José Galindo, is a Guatemalan performance artist who specializes in body art. Galindo's female body works focus on two major representations: First, the representation of the "excessive, carnalized, grotesque and abject female body"; Second, on the "female body that has been subjected to violence at a private and public level". Galindo uses the body to explore "female sexuality, notions of feminine beauty, race or domestic and national violence".

For another example, there is Karen Finley, a female performer who performs nude, by shocking her audiences with violent and sexually abusing stories. Within Finley's performance, she used to stand at the point as "victims of rape, child abuse, AIDS, domestic violence and racism". Finley is using her body and the nudity from her body performance to "speak for other women who are unable to speak for themselves...". Finley's body is a medium to present as a "site of oppression". Though some critiques of Finley's nudity performances describe her work as "pornographic", Finley believes that a woman's body can become a representative of all the bodies of all women who had/have/will be suffered from those oppression.

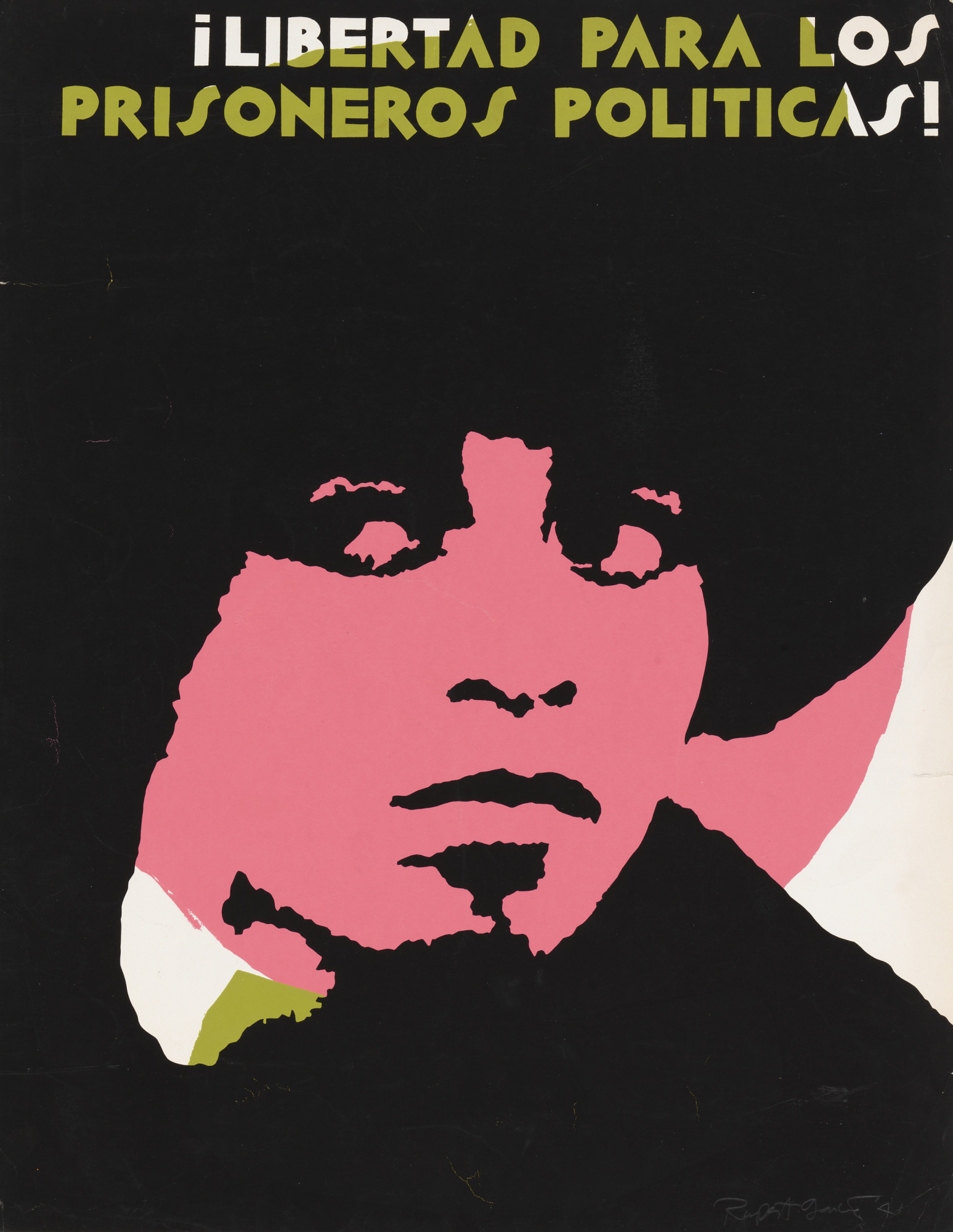
The emergence of digital graphic art created by Rupert García represents feminist art and political communication of Black feminist and political advocacy of Dr. Angela Davis.

Carolee Schneemann's "Interior Scroll" is a famous performance from 1975 in which she stood on a table, gently unrolled a scroll tucked inside her vagina, and read aloud from it. The artwork criticizes the male-dominated art world and stands for the reclamation of women's bodies.

Judy Chicago's "The Dinner Party" was an enormous installation piece created between 1974 and 1979 and depicts a triangular table with place settings for 39 famous women in history. The complex designs on each dish, which celebrate women's accomplishments and raise awareness about the exclusion of female contributions, resemble vulvae.

Marina Abramović's "Rhythm 0" was a durational performance from 1974 in which she invited the audience to use 72 objects on her in any way they chose. Power, vulnerability, and the objectification of women were all topics that were covered throughout the performance.

Orlan's "The Reincarnation of Saint Orlan" In this continuing performance piece that dates back to 1990, the artist has had her face altered through several plastic procedures in order to conform it to the ideals of Western art history. Orlan examines problems of identity and the nexus between art and technology by questioning beauty standards and the commodification of women's bodies.

Suzanne Lacy's "The Institute of the Feminine Mystique" The purpose of this performance, which took place in 1977, was to discuss the expectations that society has for women. In order to question these established positions, Lacy and her collaborators created a pretend institute that offered services like cooking classes, weight loss programs, and self-help lectures.

Guerrilla Girls' The Advantages of Being a Woman Artist Since the 1980s, The Guerrilla Girls, an anonymous collective of feminist artists, have used performance art to highlight racial and gender disparities in the art industry. They are holding up a list of benefits that male artists have over their female counterparts in this particular piece while wearing gorilla masks.

=== Body art ===
Body art can be tattoos, body piercing, branding, scarification, dermal anchors, and three-dimensional art or body modifications such as beading. Body art can be an example of performance art and they can be overlapped in feminist art. For example, there is Nil Yalter's film The Headless Woman (Belly Dance). It focuses on a woman's stomach on which text has been inscribed. And the woman keeps writing the text on the belly (body art). And as the woman begins her belly dance, all we see is the soft flesh of her undulating stomach, and the pulsing text.

An example is Cut Piece by Yoko Ono: In 1964, Ono performed Cut Piece, in which she invited the audience to cut portions of her garment with scissors while she sat on a stage wearing her nicest dress. Topics like vulnerability, agency, and objectification of women were all touched on in the performance.

Barbara Kruger's Your Body is a Battleground: This famous piece of art from 1989 combines a black-and-white image of a woman's face with the bold words "Your Body is a Battleground." In her essay, Kruger addresses topics including body commodification, reproductive rights, and control.

Hannah Wilke's Nude Descending a Staircase, No. 2 In this performance from 1976, Wilke descended a stairway slowly while wearing sculptures made out of chewed-up gum. She fought the commodification of women's bodies, the male gaze, and sexualization in her piece.

Ana Mendieta's The Pregnant Woman: Mendieta explored the relationship between her body and nature in a series of performances from the 1970s. She utilized her bare body as a canvas for The Pregnant Woman, pushing it against various objects like rocks and trees to make imprints. The piece honors the female body's capacity for conception and childrearing.

By Suzanne Lacy, In Mourning and In Rage: A group of women, directed by Suzanne Lacy, laid down on the grass of a Los Angeles cemetery in the shape of a huge peace sign for this performance in 1977. The concert was a protest against violence against women, especially the murders committed by the Hillside Strangler at the time.

Another example is Orlan's Redressing III. In this 1990 work, Orlan has plastic surgery while awake and broadcasts the procedure to a gallery audience. The piece questions gender norms, masculine gaze, and the pressure on women to uphold specific standards of beauty.

These examples show how feminist body art challenges and subverts conventional ideas about the female body by bringing attention to issues of power, control, and agency and reclaiming women's bodies as places for resistance and self-expression.

=== Video art ===
Starting in the late 1960s, video art appeared in the art world as a unique art form using video technology as a visual and sound medium. And unlike classic and traditional arts like painting and sculpture, video art was not only dominated by men in history. With the aid of new technology, female artists were able to tell their own stories and share their perspectives, resulting in new works about women that would serve as a repository for the feminist history of contemporary art. The video was seen as a trigger for a media revolution that could put the means of television transmission in the hands of the general population, giving the feminist art movement a huge opportunity to expand its audience. There were female artists who demonstrated feminism through video art such as Pipilotti Rist, Shirin Neshat, Martha Rosler, Chantal Akerman, Marleen Gorris, Joan Jonas, Sadie Benning, and more.

An example is the 1975 book "Semiotics of the Kitchen" by Martha Rosler: In this renowned video performance, Martha Rosler parodies the structure of a cooking show, but instead of showcasing her domestic prowess, she vents her resentment and rage by wielding kitchen implements. The show criticizes traditional gender norms and the notion that women should be submissive and domestic.

Dara Birnbaum's "Technology/Transformation: Wonder Woman" (1978–1979): The popular television program "Wonder Woman" is dissected in Birnbaum's video art work by focusing on and replaying specific scenes where the lead character assumes her heroic persona. By editing the video, Birnbaum explores how women are portrayed in the media and challenges the constraints and standards put on female characters.

Suzanne Lacy's "The Cyphers" (1977–1978): The experiences of African American women living in Watts, Los Angeles, are the main subject of Lacy's video work. Lacy emphasizes the perspectives and experiences of these women through interviews and performances, shedding focus on the interconnectedness of race, gender, and class and questioning prevailing myths.

Annette Messager's "A Short History of the Wheel" was published in 1972. In this work of video art, Messager offers a feminist critique of the demands imposed on women by society. She explores issues of power, oppression, and the constrained roles given to women through a sequence of symbolic images and acts.

== Notable artists and collectives of the movement ==
=== Artists: 19th century ===
- Rosa Bonheur (1822–1899)
- Barbara Bodichon (1827–1891)
- Kristiane Konstantin-Hansen (1848–1925)
- Marie Bashkirtseff (1858–1884)
- Wilhelmina Weber Furlong (1978–1962)
- Maria Dulębianka (1861–1919)
- Jessie Newbery (1864–1948)
- Evelyn De Morgan (1855–1919)
- Mary Cassatt (1845–1926)

=== Artists: 20th and 21st centuries ===
- Marina Abramović (born 1946)
- Eija-Liisa Ahtila (born 1959)
- Ghada Amer (born 1963)
- Emma Amos (1937–2020)
- Laurie Anderson (born 1947)
- Janine Antoni (born 1964)
- Vanessa Beecroft (born 1969)
- Cosima von Bonin (born 1962)
- Louise Bourgeois (1911–2010)
- Angela Bulloch (born 1966)
- Sophie Calle (born 1953)
- Judy Chicago (born 1939)
- Lygia Clark (1920–1988)
- Hanne Darboven (1941–2009)
- Sonia Delaunay (1885–1979)
- Orshi Drozdik (born 1946)
- Marlene Dumas (born 1953)
- Tracey Emin (born 1963)
- Hanna Eshel (1926–2023)
- Valie Export (born 1940)
- Sylvie Fleury (born 1961)
- Katharina Fritsch (born 1956)
- Ellen Gallagher (born 1965)
- Isa Genzken (born 1948)
- Nan Goldin (born 1953)
- Natalia Goncharova (1881–1962)
- Renée Green (born 1959)
- Asta Gröting (born 1961)
- Guerrilla Girls (born 1985)
- Roxana Halls (born 1974)
- Mona Hatoum (born 1952)
- Barbara Hepworth (1903–1975)
- Lynn Hershman (born 1941)
- Eva Hesse (1936–1970)
- Susan Hiller (1940–2019)
- Hannah Wilke (1940–1993)
- Hannah Höch (1889–1978)
- Candida Höfer (born 1944)
- Nancy Holt (1938–2014)
- Rebecca Horn (born 1944)
- Frida Kahlo (1907–1954)
- Toba Khedoori (born 1964)
- Karen Kilimnik (born 1955)
- Sarah Maple (born 1985)
- Dindga McCannon (born 1947)
- Ana Mendieta (1948–1985)
- Shirin Neshat (born 1957)
- Orlan (born 1947)
- Yoko Ono (born 1933)
- Carolee Schneeman (1939–2019)
- Yayoi Kusama (1929–2026)
- Barbara Kruger (born 1945)
- Suzy Lake (born 1947)
- Jenny Holzer (born 1950)
- Cindy Sherman (born 1957)
- Kara Walker (born 1969)
- Adrian Piper (born 1948)
- Amal Kenawy (1974–2012)
- Andrea Fraser (born 1965)
- Coco Fusco (born 1960)
- Emily Jacir (born 1970)
- Larissa Sansour (born 1973)
- Laurie Simmons (born 1949)
- Faith Ringgold (born 1930)
- Carrie Mae Weems (born 1953)
- Mickalene Thomas (born 1971)
- Sherrie Levine (born 1947)
- Mimi Smith (born 1942)
- Lia Garcia (born 1989)

=== Artist collectives ===
- Guerrilla Girls (founded 1985)
- A.I.R. Gallery (founded 1972)
- Heresies Collective
- iQhiya Collective
- Las Damas de Arte (founded 1971)
- Mujeres de Maiz
- Ni Santas (founded 2016)
- Ridykeulos collective (founded 2005)
- Pussy Riot
- Speaking of I.M.E.L.D.A.
- SOHO20
- Spiderwoman Theater (founded 1976)

== See also ==
- Antimonumenta, feminist protest art in Mexico
- Cyberfeminism
- Feminism in 1950s Britain
- Feminist art criticism
- Feminist art movement in the United States
- Historiography
- List of 20th century women artists
- n.paradoxa
- Postmodern feminism
- Timeline of the feminist art movement in New Zealand
- Women artists
- Women's Art Movement, in Australia 1970s–1980s
