= Kota Neelima =

Indian author, artist, and politician

Dr. Kota Neelima
- Born: United Andhra Pradesh
- Education: Jawaharlal Nehru University; University of Delhi; Johns Hopkins University
- Occupations: Politician, Author, Researcher, Political Commentator, Artist
- Spouse: Pawan Khera
- Writing career
- Language: Telugu, English, Hindi
- Genres: Non-fiction, Fiction, Commentary
- Notable works: Widows of Vidarbha; Shoes Of The Dead
- Website: www.kotaneelima.com

Dr. Kota Neelima is an Indian politician, author, researcher, political commentator and artist. She serves as the Vice President of the Telangana Congress (TPCC). Her public work focuses on public welfare, democratic governance, farmers’ issues, rural development, and social justice. Her research and writings address agrarian distress, gender equality, electoral reforms, and the concerns of marginalized communities in India. She is the author of Widows of Vidarbha: Making of Shadows and the novel Shoes of the Dead.

== Early life and education ==
Neelima was born to the journalist and author, Late Shri K.V.S. Rama Sarma, and Uma Sarma in United Andhra Pradesh. She obtained a PhD in political science from University of Delhi, and a Master of Arts in international relations from the Jawaharlal Nehru University, Delhi. Neelima has also been a Senior Research Fellow, South Asia Studies at the Paul H. Nitze School of Advanced International Studies (SAIS), Johns Hopkins University, Washington DC. She also studied at the Academy of Fine Arts and Literature led by Arpana Caur.

== Research and writing ==
Neelima has written books on the poor and women in India in both genres of fiction and non-fiction. Her novels Riverstones and Moneylender are based on rural farmers in India, and her novel Shoes of the Dead includes a focus on farmer suicides. In 2016, filmmaker Vetrimaaran optioned Shoes of The Dead to be adapted into a film. Her novel The Honest Season is a political thriller with a female journalist as the lead character.

Her non-fiction book Widows of Vidarbha: Making of Shadows is about the life of widows after the suicides of their farmer husbands due to agriculture distress in Vidarbha region of Maharashtra. In a review for the Hindustan Times, Manjula Narayan writes, "The writing is taut, often ironic, and devoid of unnecessary adjectives and stylistic flourishes. Instead, the author allows the women to speak, putting down the nuances of each of their stories, almost editing herself out. The result is a book that's filled with stark pain, one that's almost unbearably honest." Her non-fiction works also include two books on spirituality. One of them, Tirupati: A Guide to Life has been translated to Hindi, Telugu and Tamil languages.

As a journalist, Neelima covered politics as a principal correspondent for The Indian Express and was the Political Editor of The Sunday Guardian. Neelima writes in Economic and Political Weekly, The Huffington Post India, The Quint, The Wire, DNA, and Hindustan Times. Her research organization, Institute of Perception Studies (IPS), maps rural distress and advocates for solutions, and is also the founder of Rate The Debate, a campaign about media reforms. She is also heading Hakku Initiative, Hyderabad, which is a campaign-based and solution-oriented initiative, some of its campaigns are 'Is Hyderabad Monsoon Ready?.', Citizen Safety and Wine Shops', Sanitation Warriors of Hyderabad, Wall Against Citizens, Paddy Farmers of Telangana, Close Drain Save Lifes, Citizen Referendum on Wine Shops in Hyderabad. Her academic articles are on distress, farmer suicides and reforms on electoral system in India, such as 'Right to Recall'. She also speaks at academic institutions on topics including agricultural crisis and gender. Her initiative StudioAdda conducts periodic outreach events like art and photography shows, and discussions on social, economic and political conditions of India.

Neelima also participates in literary festivals and discussions, including the Jaipur Literary Festival, Apeejay Kolkata Literary Festival, Dehradun Literature Festival, Odisha Literary Festival, Times LitFest, OotyLitFest Times LitFest, Delhi Literary Festival and a workshop organsied by Pune University on the issues rural farm widows. Dr. Kota Neelima participated as a panellist in the 'Telangana Rising – Welfare Policies' session at Bharat Summit 2026.

During the discussion, she highlighted the importance of rights-based welfare policies, inclusive development, social justice and accountable governance, emphasising the need for people-centric policies that empower communities, strengthen constitutional values and create equal opportunities for all.

== Publications ==
=== Non-fiction books ===
- Tirupati: A Guide to Life, Penguin (2012)
- Tirumala: Sacred Foods of God, Roli Publications (2017)
- Widows of Vidarbha: Making of Shadows, Oxford University Press, (2018)

=== Fiction books ===
- Riverstones, Penguin (Reprint/2016)
- Death of a Moneylender, Penguin (Reprint/2016)
- Shoes of the Dead, Rupa Publications (2013)
- The Honest Season, Penguin (2015)

=== Chapter in edited books ===
- "Tirupati: The God for a Modern Age" in Travelling In, Travelling Out: A Book of Unexpected Journeys Edited by Namita Gokhale (2014)

=== Articles ===
- Widows of Farmer Suicide Victims in Vidarbha, Economic and Political Weekly, Vol.53, Issue No. 26-27, 30 June 2018, pp. 24–31.
- 'Right to Recall' Reform Experience in Madhya Pradesh, Economic and Political Weekly, Vol.LII, No. 13, 1 April 2017, pp. 24–26.

== Painting and photography ==
Neelima is also a painter whose work often incorporates charcoal sketching before paint. In 2017, in her exhibition Remains of Ayodhya, Places of Worship, she reflected on Ayodhya and related themes of freedom and harmony. In 2018, Swati Rai wrote for The Tribune, "As an artist, her paintings abound in minimalism, which is a clear and consistent element in her art." Her 2018 exhibition Metaphors of the Moon was influenced by her work on her book Widows of Vidarbha: Making of Shadows, which documented the lives of widows after the suicides of their farmer husbands. In a review of the exhibit, Shilpa R writes, "The concept of negotiating and documenting the absence in and around us has been a recurring motif in the author-painter's oeuvre. [...] As is her wont, Neelima has always turned to the creative medium to draw attention to what she felt was left unsaid in the written word."

In 2019, sales proceeds from her ninth solo exhibition, a photography exhibit titled The Nature of Things: Death and Dualism in Indian Villages that is part of her research for Azim Premji University, Bengaluru, were donated to farmers' widows.

Her works have been featured at the Lalit Kala Akademi and the India Habitat Centre in Delhi, and in art shows in Mumbai, Bangalore, Kolkata, among other cities in India. Her works have also been featured at several international exhibitions, including The Nehru Centre, London, Museum, and China Art Museum, National Museum of Fine Arts, Bishkek, Kyrgyzstan. Her works are part of the permanent collection in Museum of Sacred Arts, Belgium.

== Political career ==
She serves as the Vice President of the Telangana Pradesh Congress Committee and is a member of the Indian National Congress. She has previously held the position of General Secretary of the Telangana Pradesh Congress Committee and currently serves as the Congress in-charge for the Sanathnagar Assembly Constituency. In the 2023 Telangana Assembly elections, she contested as the Congress Party candidate from the Sanathnagar Constituency and was also a member of the party’s manifesto committee for the 2023 Assembly elections.

Dr. Kota Neelima has been entrusted by the Indian National Congress with key leadership responsibilities spanning organisational restructuring, political coordination, women's empowerment and legal affairs. Her roles within the Telangana Pradesh Congress Committee reflect her involvement in shaping the party's organisational direction and strengthening its institutional framework.

As part of the Congress Party's flagship Sangathan Srijan Abhiyan — a historic initiative to revitalise and strengthen the organisation from the grassroots upwards — she was appointed Telangana Congress Observer for Vikarabad district, with the responsibility of overseeing the selection process for the District Congress Committee (DCC) President. This assignment placed her within the party's organisational restructuring and grassroots leadership development process.

She also serves as In-charge of the Telangana Shakti Abhiyan and holds responsibility for the Telangana Congress Legal Cell, with roles spanning women's empowerment, political participation, legal coordination and organisational affairs.

She has been actively involved in addressing various social issues affecting the people of Telangana and Sanathnagar. She played a significant role in the Dharani campaign in Telangana, advocating for the concerns of farmers and landowners regarding land records and related challenges. Through extensive public outreach and advocacy, she highlighted people’s grievances and worked towards finding solutions to their issues.

Through her grassroots initiatives, she focused on reaching every household in the Sanathnagar Constituency by creating awareness about current Congress government, Government of Telangana welfare programmes, particularly the Praja Palana schemes. By directly engaging with residents, she helped people understand and access various government benefits and ensured that eligible families were connected with welfare initiatives.

She has also led campaigns against liquor shops operating in residential areas, organizing protests and public movements that contributed to the relocation of some establishments from residential neighbourhoods. Her efforts have reflected her commitment to addressing local concerns and improving the quality of life for residents.

Her participation in the sacred Bonalu celebrations at the Sri Sri Balkampet Yellamma Temple and Sri Ujjaini Mahakali Temple in the Sanathnagar Assembly constituency reflects her respect for Hindu traditions and Telangana’s spiritual heritage. During these auspicious festivals, her focus is on supporting devotees and helping ensure a peaceful and comfortable darshan experience. She raised concerns over the delay in the Balkampet Sri Yellamma Kalyanam Rathotsavam (2026), reportedly due to the late arrival of the local MLA. She emphasized that auspicious muhurats (sacred timings) in Hindu religious rituals hold great significance and should be respected, as they are not meant to be delayed for any individual, regardless of position or political status. Her stand highlighted the importance of preserving traditional customs and respecting the sentiments of devotees.

As part of efforts to promote electoral transparency, she conducted a voter verification drive in Sanathnagar, identifying discrepancies in electoral rolls, including entries of shifted and deceased voters. The initiative was aligned with the broader Vote Chor, Gaddi Chhod campaign led by Rahul Gandhi, which also addressed voter-related concerns in her Assembly Constituency. She has also supervised the Special Intensive Revision (SIR) campaign in the constituency, focusing on voter list verification, accuracy, and ensuring that eligible citizens are properly included in the electoral rolls.

== National Politics ==
Dr. Kota Neelima has been entrusted by the Indian National Congress with key political and electoral responsibilities beyond Telangana. She served as an AICC Election Observer for the Amravati Lok Sabha constituency in Maharashtra during the 2024 General Elections and was assigned party responsibilities in Himachal Pradesh during the 2024 Assembly by-elections. These assignments reflect her role in the Congress Party's electoral strategy, political coordination and organisational work across states.

== Honors and awards ==
- Exceptional Women of Excellence, Women Economic Forum (WEF) 2019
- Social Changemaker Award, Indian Women Achievers Awards (IWAA) 2024 - Recognized for contributions toward social impact, public service, and community welfare.

== Personal life ==
Neelima married to Pawan Khera, a senior leader of the Indian National Congress who serves as a Rajya Sabha Member of Parliament from Karnataka and is the Chairman of the Congress party’s Media and Publicity Department.

== See also ==
- List of Indian writers
- List of Indian women writers
- List of Indian women artists
