= Kapil Tiwari =

Indian doctor and folk philanthropist

- Born: Madhya Pradesh
- Education: Sagar University
- Known for: Folk Philanthropist
- Awards: Padma Shri (2020)

Kapil Tiwari is an Indian expert on folk and tribal culture. He was awarded the Padma Shri for his contribution to folk art and culture in 2021.

== Early life and education ==
Tiwari is from Sagar, Madhya Pradesh. In 1979, he earned a doctorate in Hindi Literature from Sagar University and subsequently moved to Bhopal.

== Career ==
Tiwari was the former director of Adivasi Lo Kala Academy and an executive board member of Bharat Bhavan. He worked for the development of folk and tribal communities. He has edited over 39 books associated with the folk culture.

== Awards ==
- In 2021, he was awarded the Padma Shri by the Indian Government for his contribution in folk.
