= Manimala Chitrakar =

- Born: Naya, West Bengal, India
- Style: Bengal patua or pattachitra

Manimala Chitrakar is a patua artist from West Bengal.

== Biography ==
Manimala belongs to a traditional community of chitrakars (itinerant scroll painters) from West Bengal. She was born in the village of Naya in the family of Dukhushyam Chitrakar, a renowned patua artist himself. As a child she used to accompany her grandfather as he went looking for patrons and clients in the villages, and so was exposed to the art-form from a very young age.

In an interview from 2005, Manimala elaborated on how the art form has significantly influenced her life:

"If I hadn't learned this craft I could not have gone to the United States. I tell all of the young people of Naya to learn this skill if they want to travel and earn a living. My abilities have allowed me to develop a broader sense of the world - my life has not been restricted to the confines of Naya."

She is a mother of six children and continues to live in her ancestral village.

== Style ==
Earlier works of Manimala deal primarily with mythological themes, but have an inherent rawness in the handling of the subjects. The wrath of gods against illicit sexual unions, men and women in various stages of nakedness as they are subjected to hell's torturous routines, fearsome demons and large slithering snakes crowd her canvas.

Over time, her artistic oeuvre expanded to include more colors, iconographic variations and themes. From pressing social issues of the world at large to belief systems that hold her social fabric together - she has explored a large variety of subject matter in a career spanning more than a decade.

== Exhibitions and collections ==
- Vernacular in the Contemporary Part I, Devi Art Foundation, Gurgaon, 2011.
- Lakshmipat Singhania Academy, Art Mela, 2016
- The 8th Asia-Pacific Triennial of Contemporary Art, 2016
- Queensland Arts Gallery and Gallery of Modern Art, Brisbane, Australia
