= Lado Bai =

Indian artist

- Born: Jhabua, Madhya Pradesh

Lado Bai is a tribal artist from the Bhil tribe of Madhya Pradesh. Her work has been showcased in various exhibitions in India, France and the UK.

She lives and works in the Adivasi Lok Kala Academy, Bhopal.

== Early life and career ==
Lado Bai was born in the Badi Bawadi village of Jhabua, Madhya Pradesh in the Bhil tribal community. At a very early age, she moved to Bhopal with her family to be engaged as manual labourers in the building of the iconic Bharat Bhavan. She got married and continued to work in the building complex and also painted to de-stress after a day's work.

Lado Bai started her work alongside Bhuri Bai. Her art reflects the spirituality and animism of her community. For years, she could not pursue her art because of financial constraints. Her luck turned when she was discovered by the famous Indian artist Jagdish Swaminathan. Swaminathan encouraged her to work for the Adivasi Lok Kala Academy where she had the opportunity to transfer images of festivals, rituals and animals from wall to paper.

== Bhil art ==
The Bhil Tribe are indigenous, being the Second largest Tribal Community in India. Art is Integral to the Bhil Community. The rich texture of their paintings generally depict nature and Adivasi Style that is their legacy. Bhil artists are just starting to be internationally recognized. They paint the simple human joys of birth and other ceremonial occasions like harvests that are often forgotten in our modern society. The art of the Bhils along with that of other tribal groups reminds us what the simple pleasures in life are.

== Inspiration and style ==
Lado Bai's works are characteristic for their formal simplicity, heightened by her use of dots. Nature, spirituality and animism find dominance in her canvases. She is inspired by the stories told by elders in her community, myths and rituals of the tribe and the flora and fauna she encounters in her everyday life. Bai creates art reflects the flora and fauna of her environment along with the customs and festivals of her tribe. Her work is informed by the timeless tradition of Bhil painting, portraying ritualized depictions of Pithora, the Bhil folklore god.

Lado Bai's inspirations came from the stories told her elders, and her personal faith that the gods will be pleased by her Art.

She belongs to a community famous for their ritualistic murals of god Pithora, a centuries old tradition that was primarily a man's domain. Lado Bai carries forward this timeless tradition while at the same time, developing in a strong individual visual language.

Lado Bai is among such tribal artists who are keeping their traditional identity alive in their works and lives. Her paintings reflect all the aspects of a Bhil life. She seems completely at ease while working with fine quality brush and canvas in place of a piece of jute which she would use before. Today she is working at Adivasi Lok Kala Academy in Bhopal and is contented with her job as an artist.

In Lado Bai's work, nature, spirituality and animism of her community are dominant themes. With the encouragement and support of late Indian artist Jagdish Swaminathan, she has developed a contemporary language of traditional artforms. The main motifs in her works are the animal kingdom and Bhil rituals and festivals. Her works demonstrate an episode of a larger story from the folklore. "We prepare for a whole night before starting to paint. There are a lot of rituals that I have shown in my work, and this is exactly how the Bhil culture is," says Bai.

== Awards and ceremonies ==
Lado Bai is the Master Ojas Art Awardee. The Ojas Art Award 2017, instituted by Ojas Art Gallery, was awarded this year to a couple of Bhil artists from Bhopal, Madhya Pradesh at the Jaipur Literature Festival (JLF) 2017. Lado Bai was awarded under the Master Artist category, winning a sum of Rs 51,000. She belongs to the early group of artists of this genre and was among the first bheel artists, besides bhuri bai, to have worked directly with J Swaminathan.

== Family ==
For Lado Bai, whose family joined her in painting the canvas, the elements of the picture are drawn from the deep collective memory of her ancestors, which she has evoked in the Pithora tradition. She points to the peasants gathering harvested maize and millet, the tents and marquees of the marketplace, and the bullock carts laden with produce making their way to the bazaars. Her daughter, Anita, assisted her in painting murals.

== Select exhibition ==
- 2016 – "Creative Customs: International Folk Art," Peninsula School of Art, Fish Creek, WI
- 2017 – "Satrang", Ojas Art Gallery, New Delhi, India
- 2017 – "water+wisdom Australia India," Royal Melbourne Institute of Technology University, Melbourne, Australia
- 2020 – "Merging Narratives," Ojas Art Gallery, New Delhi, India
- 2022 – "Lado Bai: The Early Years," Ojas Art Gallery, New Delhi, India

== Select collections ==
- The Indira Gandhi National Center for the Arts, New Delhi
- Saffronart, Mumbai
- National Handicrafts and Handlooms Museum, New Delhi
- Sutra Gallery, Wisconsin, United States
