= Widows of Vidarbha =

2018 book by Kota Neelima

Widows of Vidarbha: Making of Shadows
- Author: Kota Neelima
- Language: English
- Publisher: Oxford University Press
- Publication date: 2018
- Publication place: India
- ISBN: 9780199484676
- Website: www.kotaneelima.com

Widows of Vidarbha: Making of Shadows is a non-fiction book by Kota Neelima published in 2018 by Oxford University Press. The book chronicles the lives of 16 widows of farmers in India after their husbands died from suicide, and the experiences of the women afterwards.

== Synopsis ==
Based on interviews with 16 widows from the Yavatmal and Amravati districts of Vidarbha, the book explores the impact of farming crises in 2001-2004 and 2012-13 in 18 anecdotes from the viewpoint of women whose farmer husbands died by suicide, including how they managed to support their families.

== Reception ==
In a review for the Hindustan Times, Manjula Narayan writes, "The writing is taut, often ironic, and devoid of unnecessary adjectives and stylistic flourishes. Instead, the author allows the women to speak, putting down the nuances of each of their stories, almost editing herself out. The result is a book that's filled with stark pain, one that's almost unbearably honest." In a review for The Hindu Business Line, TV Jayan writes, "Each chapter in this book is a real story of gritty women who made all sincere efforts to bring up their children and provide them with education to the extent possible despite all odds in life and limitations imposed on them by the society."

A review published in Firstpost states, "Neelima's book focuses on the voices of the widows of these farmers who are otherwise ignored, shunned and subjugated by their families and the government. It's a deeply relevant contextualisation of the women who never make it to the narrative." In a review for Feminism in India, Devanshi Varandani writes, "The 18 anecdotes in the book, in a subtle yet effective way, discusses 4 key topics: Identity crisis in the patriarchal society; the urgency of providing quality education to the young generation as an incumbent on the government. Next, the book stresses on the transition in the dreams and hopes of the family members after the demise of farmers. Lastly, the approach of the state and politics." Aekta Kapoor writes in eShe, "The widows in Neelima’s book have learnt to protest in quiet ways, and avoid confrontation so as not to disturb the patriarchy. Theirs is a silent, subversive fight to get their due."
