= Baaraan Ijlal =

Indian artist

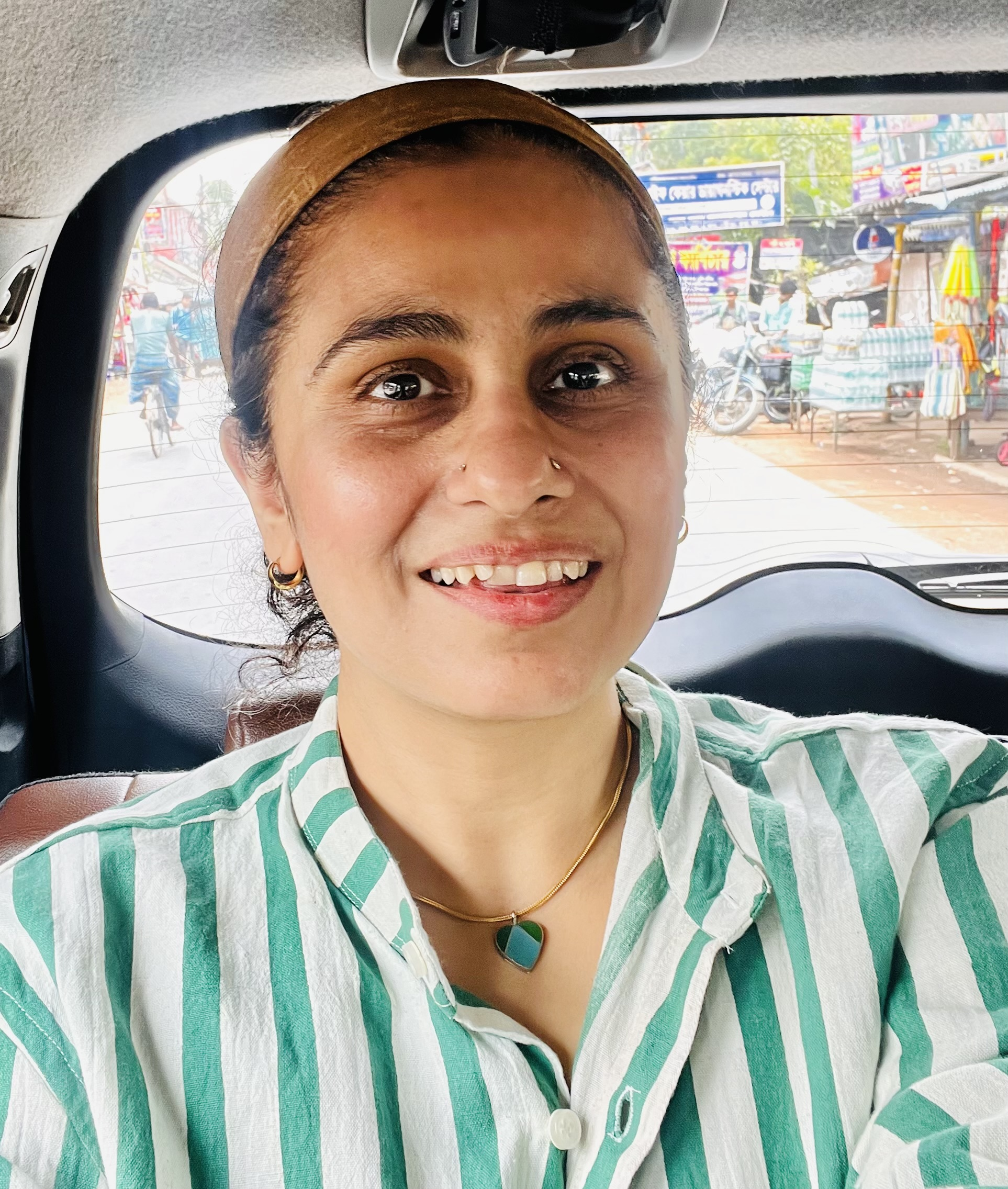
- Baaraan Ijlal in 2023
- Born: Bhopal, Madhya Pradesh, India
- Occupation: Artist
- Known for: Visual Arts, Sound Art
- Notable work: Diary Entries (2020-); Hostile Witness (2014-); Change Room (2018-); Coal Couture (2018); Silent Minarets, Whispering Winds (2015-16); BirdBox (2016)

Baaraan Ijlal is a self-taught artist based in New Delhi, India. She was born and educated in Bhopal, doing her Masters in English Literature. Through her work, she seeks to explore the themes of anonymity and individual liberty as to how anonymity serves as a cornerstone for personal freedom. This is punctuated by a dedicated focus on creating an atmosphere of attentive listening that invites viewers to become witnesses to the untold stories inhabiting her creations. Her artistic mediums include acrylic paint, sound, video, light, embroidery, galvanized iron, resin installations, among others. Her work has been prominently featured in solo exhibitions and collaborative showcases. It includes expositions and installations at prominent art galleries and museums such as the Chhatrapati Shivaji Maharaj Vastu Sangrahalaya and Jehangir Nicholson Art Foundation at Mumbai, Kiran Nadar Museum of Art at New Delhi, KADIST Arts at Paris, Conflictorium Museum at Ahmedabad, the Devi Art Foundation, Colomboscope at Colombo, India Art Fair, Art Dubai, Art Singapore, Chintretsukan Gallery at the Tokyo University of the Arts, and other public spaces.

== Works ==
Baaraan Ijlal has experimented with various mediums over the years. Her first major exhibition, titled Retellings, displayed thirty of her major paintings from two of her series, Stitched Wings and To Be Continued. Installations from House of Commons (2010) consisting of almirahs were displayed that were "painted from inside to outside, with figures painted in specific landscapes." These are imagined as houses that would allow an imagining of personal and intimate spaces of "common people."

Diary Entries (2020–present), is an ongoing series of paintings chronicling the everyday moments that carry the import of loss and violence. Locust Eaten Moon (2020–) serialized as a part of Diary Entries, is described in the concept art as the "visual archives of the moon, of the Self, and of the passing time. These entries mark the everyday and the extraordinary, to make a note of a particular loss or act of resistance in a specific moment in the historic sequence of our time on this planet." Another series, Mourners and Witnesses (2021-), described as a "narrative of loss and violence," are conceptualized as visual diary entries through Baaraan's paintings. Structures and sculptures in wood were designed by Moonis Ijlal, a frequent collaborator.

Hostile Witness (2014–present) is an ongoing series on silenced narratives. It "explores the lasting phenomenon of mute spectatorship and its normalization at the expense of extreme violence." It was brought to life by listening to people's narratives between 2014 and 2019 around specific sites in Bhopal, Delhi, Kolkata, Lucknow, Mumbai, and Varanasi and painting the details into the canvas. Baaraan collaborated with Moonis Ijlal to further develop pictographic alphabets. Moonis also designed the wooden structures and sculptures for the series. Hostile Witness seamlessly weaves fantastic creatures with factual details to create living records of human activity and their involvement with historical events. It was the Arte Laguna Prize Finalist held in Venice (November 2024).

The latest series in the Hostile Witness series, titled The Partition Chapter (Between Dusk and Dawn: Women, Land, and Borders) focuses on the tragedy of the partition. As per the concept art, “the partition of a land is not a singular event confined to the past, but a living, breathing force that continues to reverberate, leaving its mark in the dissonant rhythms of divided lives and violent reconfigurations of power. The sky holds within it the tremors of these upheavals: a canvas for both hope and despair, for reckoning and restitution.” It served as part of the Collisions exhibition at People’s Hall, London (October 2024).

Change Room (2018–present) is a traveling sound installation of voices of people sharing their fears, apprehensions, desires, and finding perspective through telling, listening and witnessing. The concept art notes that "this sound installation is conceptualized as an open channel of voices telling their stories anonymously, with the artist as the witness. Those who have recorded their stories with artists as witnesses include students, nomads, climate refugees, and war refugees, to name a few. The viewers walk into a room with the prerecorded conversations playing. They can then opt to record their own reflections, which are then added to the audio being played. Thus, the installation grows on site." It led to the creation of Change Room Archives that features the voices of people who have gone on record, anonymously, at the Change Room art installations around the world. Some select exhibitions include those at Khoj International Artists Association (2023), Chintretsukan Gallery, Tokyo (2019), CREA re-conference, Kathmandu (2019), Conflictorium Museum, Ahmedabad (2018), TENT Arts Space, Kolkata (2018).

Coal Couture (2018) was launched at the World Health Organization's First Global Conference on Air Pollution and Health (2018) in Geneva. It is imagined as “a mock brand of luxury luggage made as a coveted couture object manufactured to meet the specific requirements of the few” in colonized regimes, exposing the larger population in those endangered areas to various evils. It does so by poignantly showcasing five objects belonging to children from across the world, highlighting their vulnerability and health risks in a precarious world.

BirdBox (2016) is conceptualized as a portable bioscope that merges audio and video to recreate crucial moments from a woman's life. The concept art notes that "a reimagined bioscope, Birdbox is a traveling audio-video installation involving young girls from north Indian villages and towns mass viewing and ruminating anonymously over images of high and pop art representing young women, from the sculpture of the Indus Valley girl to Amrita Shergil, nudes, and Hindi film songs. Birdbox suspends us for a fraction of time into how the world looks, feels, sounds, and feels from a girl's perspective."

Silent Minarets, Whispering Winds (2015–16), a ten-foot artwork installed at the T2 terminal of the Mumbai International Airport, epitomizes a village in Uttar Pradesh well known for its textile work. The representational objects are "letters" written by forty women embroiderers to themselves, articulating their deepest feelings. As the notes from the concept art of Silent Minarets, Whispering Winds mention, "[with] these letters as a base, the conversations between the artist and embroiderers flow. The conversations range from women making inquiries into tradition, their place in the village, home, and financial independence." Or, in the words of the artist, "the glowing minarets mark the silent revolution by these women embroiderers as they stitch along towards a dignified future for themselves."

== Awards and Recognitions ==
- Artist-in-Residence – Sharjah Art Foundation for Separation Songs (2025)
- Finalist, Arte Laguna Award (2024)
- Critical Voice of the Year Award, Hello! India Art Awards (2022)
- Artist-in-Residence – Conflictorium Museum, Ahmedabad (2018)
- Artist-in-Residence – Sanskriti Kendra, New Delhi (2013)
