= Samhita Arni =

Indian Writer, columnist

- Occupations: Writer, columnist

Samhita Arni is an Indian writer who writes in English. She is best known for her adaptations of Indian epic poetry. She started writing and illustrating her first book The Mahabharatha - A Child’s View at the age of eight. The book then went on to be translated in seven languages and sold 50,000 copies worldwide. Her second book – Sita’s Ramayana – was on the New York Times Bestseller list for Graphic Novels for two weeks in 2011.

== Career ==
Arni's first book, The Mahabharata: A Child's View, was published in 1996, when she was 11 years old. It was translated into several European languages, and won the Elsa Morante Literary Award from the Department of Culture of Campania, Italy, among other accoladates.

As an adult, she has written two books based on the Ramayana. The first, Sita's Ramayana, is a graphic novel developed in collaboration with Patua artist Moyna Chitrakar.

Her second Ramayana adaptation is The Missing Queen, a Speculative fiction mythological thriller. It was published by Penguin/Zubaan in 2013.

The Prince, her latest book, is the culmination of a five-year journey spent studying Ilango Adigal's Silappatikaram. It was the year 2014 and the Nirbhaya case had taken centre-stage, unleashing a wave of wrath from women across the country. Arni watched this unfold, disturbed by the tragedy of what had taken place and staggered by the collective fury. It led to what she calls an obsession with Silappatikaram, the Sangam period epic, a story of love, betrayal, grief and above all, wrath. Retellings, she feels, are important for a culture to evolve. “Each generation is different, and for a myth, story, or an epic to resonate with that generation, it must be told in a way that relates with that generation's experience, in order to touch them, and for that story to remain part of our cultural psyche.

She has been a regular columnist for The Bangalore Mirror and The Hindu.

== Education ==
Arni is an alumnus of the United World Colleges in Italy. She has lived in Indonesia, Pakistan, India, Thailand, Italy and the United States.
