= Sunder Sukka =

Indian painter

Sunder Sukka (born 18 August 1978) is an Indian artist (painter) from Mahboobnagar district of Telangana State in India. He is the son of a Golla Suddula performer. Golla Suddula performance is an art form which makes people aware of the socioeconomic, political and cultural conditions with an underlying message so that they can fight for their rights.

== Early life and background ==
Sukka has had his work exhibited at numerous art galleries since 2007 and hosted his first solo show in 2014, when he exhibited 24 collections of artwork entitled 'Discourse of a People.' It took Sukka some time to host his first solo show as not many were willing to let him host one.

All the paintings, whether it is the recurring figure of lambs and sheep, or men and women from the village, were taken from the personal experiences of Sukka. When asked, Sukka explained that his paintings are an attempt to capture the artist communities which are disappearing as 'things are changing in the villages.'

== Career ==
Sukka’s interest with art began when he was in school and found that he had a talent for drawing. His first effort was an impressively accurate drawing of Rani Rudramadevi, which impressed the Elders at home. His other early inspiration was his brother who is a signboard artist. He later did paintings of leaders and as a young school boy, made greeting cards for friends and relatives, all with great encouragement from other students and teachers.

With Sukka’s interest in art continuing, he joined Bachelor of Fine Arts to pursue it seriously because objects such as lanterns, issurayyi, rolu- rokali looked interesting to him. He also enjoyed exploring extinct art forms and occupations like budaga, angalollu, gangireddulollu, kommollu, sodi chepetollu, budabudukalollu and others, in part in order to recapture art forms he witnessed growing up in his village which now are lost. In his painting 'the morning clock' the village woman is compared to the morning clock who works out her daily activities like a cock or hen.

== Personal life ==
The relationship that rural folk develop with their livestock in their daily survival etc. is a recurring theme throughout his paintings. This relation is an outcome of the society and "the socialist ideology" that he had developed over the years. Sukka's father worked as a labourer in Madhya Pradesh and thus, Sukka's work was often painted to reflect the feelings of other villagers, like his father, who had left home and their families to work as migrant labourers.

Sukka is married to Karuna Sukka and they have a daughter.

== Awards ==
Sukka received the 'Ambadas Mahurkar Award' presented by the Konaseema chitrakala parishad, Amalapuram organisation in 2007. He also received the 'Junior fellowship’ award by the Ministry of Culture, New Delhi for the year 2011-13.

== Exhibitions ==
=== Solo show ===
Sukka had his first solo show in Hyderabad in 2014. The exhibition of paintings was titled ‘Discourse of Life’ at Tamkanat Art Gallery.

Two man show: Sukka has also had a two man show with Karuna Sukka, his wife, in Hyderabad in 2011, displaying the painting and prints at the Shrishti Art Gallery.

Group shows:

Over time, Sukka has had many shows, ranging from as early as 2007 to 2015.

2007

- "Heart to Art", A group show of Paintings, Prints and Sculptures, Chitramayee State Gallery of Fine Arts, Hyderabad.
- "Look Again" A group show of Paintings, Drawings and Graphics, at Hasta Art Gallery, Hyderabad.

2012

- "Regional Art Exhibition", organized by Lalit kala Akademi, at Lalit kala Akademi Chennai.
- "Jiva" An Art Exhibition, organized by Icon Art Gallery, Hyderabad, India.
- "Art Exhibition on Bio-Diversity", organized by Department of Culture, State Gallery of Fine Arts Hyderabad, A.P.

2013

- "Genesis of Memorabilia, An Exhibition of Paintings, Ailamma Art Gallery, Hyderabad.
- "Art Jamboree 2013", conducted by Daira Center for Arts and Culture at Taj Deccan, Hyderabad.
- "Creations- old and new" An exhibition of Sculptures, paintings and prints, Art gallery, PST University, Hyderabad.
- "Within Reach-IV" group show, Nvya Art Gallery, New Delhi.

2014

- ‘Art @Telangana’, Salarjung Museum, Hyderabad.
- ‘Art @Telangana’, Metropolis World Congress, Hyderabad.
- An art exhibition of paintings and sculptures, at Muse Art Gallery, Hyderabad.
- "Kotha Panduga", First Native Telangana Artists Painting Exhibition at Chitramayee state Gallery of Fine Arts, Hyderabad, organized by Telangana Artists Forum.
- "Art exhibition of paintings and sculptures, conducted by Telangana Tourism Department at Taramathi Bhiradari, Hyderabad.
- "Art as Investment', Tamkanat Art Gallery, Hyderabad.
- "Inaugural show" of Tamkanat Art Gallery, Hyderabad.

2015

- "Affordable and Utilitarian Art Fair" of Shrishti Art Gallery, Hyderabad, January 2015.
- "Hyderabad Art Fete- 2015" organized by Hyderabad Art Society, at Muse Art Gallery, Hyderabad.

== Art camps ==
Sukka was also involved in various art camps from 2004 to 2015. These have been listed below.

2004

- Annual Artist Camp, Central University, Hyderabad.
- Print making camp under Pinaki Barua from Shantineketan at Hyderabad Central University.
- Young Artists Camp- organized by State Art Gallery of Fine Arts, Hyderabad.

2006

- A.P. State artist camp– Organized by Department of Culture, Warangal.

2007

- A.P. State artist camp organized by Department of Culture, Hyderabad.

2012

- National Artists Art Camp at Deccan Art Foundation, Hyderabad.

2013

- Art camp organized by A P Tourism Department in Nagarjuna konda, A.P.
- Workshop: Innovating traditions: interactive use of techniques between Nakashi and contemporary artist, organized by Icon Art Gallery, Hyderabad, A.P.

2014

- "Telangana Art Camp" of Art@Telangana, at Taramathi Biradari premises - 2014, held on the occasion to mark the Historical event of formation of new state of Telangana, Hyderabad.

2015

- ‘Painting Art Camp’ Organized by MCHRD, Main Office, Hyderabad.

== Collections ==
- MCHRD, Hyderabad
- Department of folk culture - PST University, Warangal.
- Apollo Hospitals, Hyderabad
