= Bhuri Bai =

Indian Bhil artist

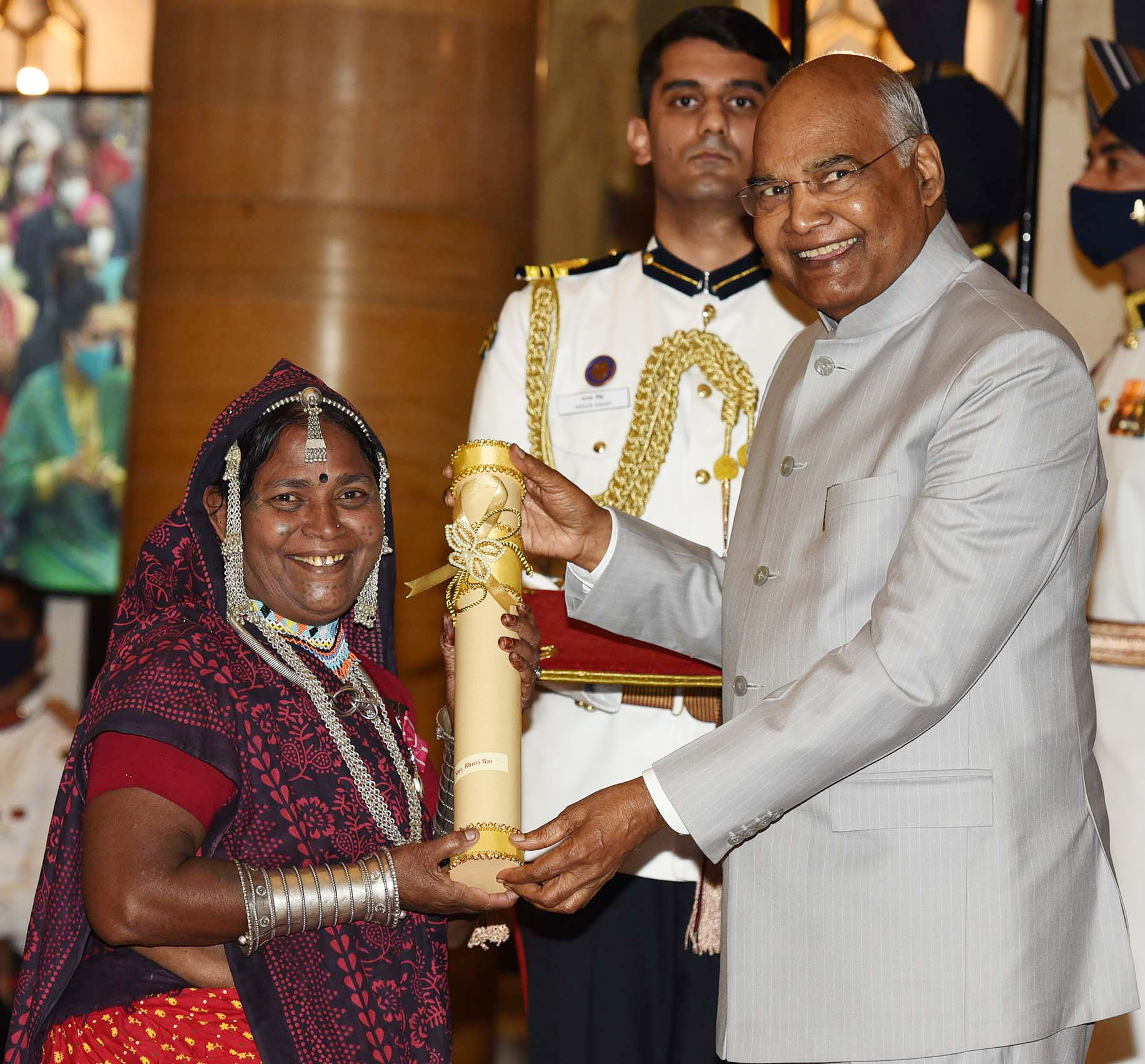
- Bhuri Bai receiving the Padma Shri award from President Ram Nath Kovind
- Born: Pitol Khurd
- Style: Bhil art
- Awards: Padma Shri (2021)
- Honours: Shikhar Samman, Madhya Pradesh

Bhuri Bai is an Indian Bhil artist. She was born in Pitol village, situated on the border of Madhya Pradesh and Gujarat. Pitol is a village of Jhabua district in Madhya Pradesh. Bhuri Bai belongs to the community of Bhils, the largest tribal group of India. She has won many awards including the highest state honour accorded to artists by the Madhya Pradesh government, the Shikhar Samman. She was awarded India's fourth highest civilian award the Padma Shri in 2021.

== Early life ==
Like her contemporary Jangarh Singh Shyam, Bhuri Bai was encouraged by J Swaminathan of Bhopal's Bharat Bhavan to start using acrylic colours and paper to make paintings. Before that, she, like other members of her community, would create art on the walls of her home. Bhuri was proficient in the making of Pithora paintings.

"In the village, we had to work so hard to extract colour from plants and clay. And here I was given so many shades of colour and a ready made brush!"

Besides painting, Bhuri Bai is also adept at the skill of hut-making, which she learnt from her mother Jhabbu Bai. She contributed to the construction of the Bhil hut in the Indira Gandhi Rashtriya Manav Sangrahalaya or Museum of Man in Bhopal, where she resides. In fact, when Bhuri Bai first arrived in Bhopal, she was engaged as a construction labourer at Bharat Bhavan—a job that earned her Rs 6 per day. It was here that she first met Jagdish Swaminathan, who spotted her talent and encouraged her to paint. Bhuri bai started her work alongside her community artist Lado Bai.

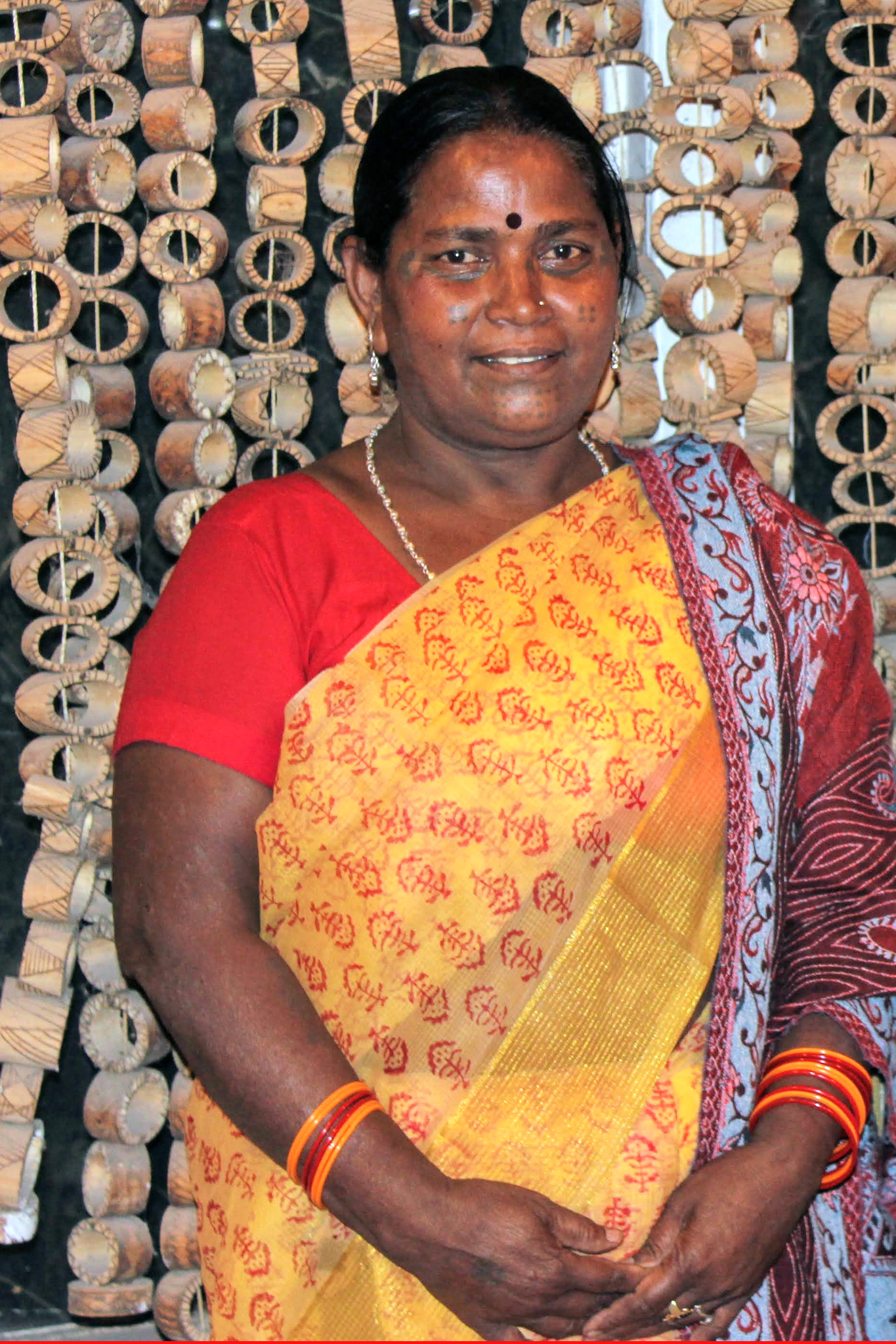
Bhuri Bai in 2016

== Style and themes ==
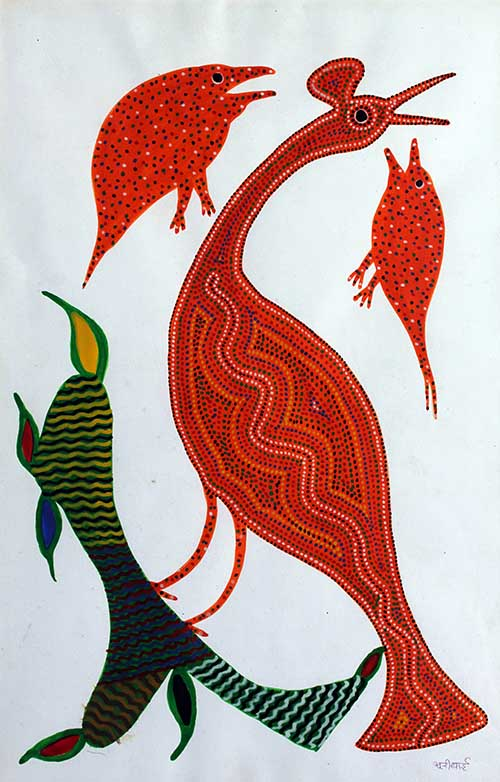
A Bhil painting by Bhuri Bai

Bhil art is considered by some to be the oldest of India's tribal art forms. It bears similarity to the aboriginal art of Australia, especially in its use of multi-coloured dots as in-filling. Bhuri Bai was the first artist of her community to start painting on paper. Her typically colourful canvases usually depict mythological themes, bucolic scenes and man-animal interactions, although later works have incorporated modern elements like airplanes and cellphones.

== Exhibitions ==
- 2017 Satrangi: Bheel Art, Ojas Art, Delhi
- 2017 "Given Power: From Tradition to Contemporary", Blueprint21 + Exhibit320, Delhi
- 2010–2011 "Vernacular, in the Contemporary", Devi Art Foundation, Bangalore
- 2010 "Other Masters of India", Musée du Quai Branly, Paris
- 2009 "Now that the Trees Have Spoken", Pundole Gallery, Mumbai
- 2008 "Freedom", Centre for International Modern Art (CIMA), Kolkata

== Awards and honours ==
- Shikhar Samman, Government of Madhya Pradesh, 1986
- Ahalya Samman, 1998
- Rani Durgavati Award, 2009
- Padma Shri Award, 2021
