= Karuna Sukka =

Indian printmaker and painter

- Born: November 20, 1980 (age 45); Hyderabad, India
- Education: 2005-2007- M.A (Fine) Museology, The M S University of Baroda, Vadodara.; 2003-2005- M.F.A Printmaking, University of Hyderabad, Hyderabad.; 1999-2003- B.F.A Painting, P.S.T University, Hyderabad.
- Known for: Printmaking, painting
- Spouse: Sunder Sukka

Karuna Sukka (Telugu: కరుణ సుక్క; born 20 November 1980) is an Indian printmaker and painter from Telangana State who works with large-scale wood-cuts to make prints.

== Early life and background ==
Karuna was born in Hyderabad and has a bachelor's degree in painting from P.S.T University, a master's degree in print making from the University of Hyderabad and a Master's in Museology from M.S University of Baroda. She has participated in numerous group shows and solo shows and has been the recipient of various awards and scholarships. These include the National Merit scholarship from the Ministry of Culture, HRD, Government of India, 2007; A.P. State award for graphics, P.S.T University, Hyderabad, 2007; 77th All India Exhibition, AIFACS, New Delhi, 2005; All India Art Exhibition, Hyderabad Art Society 2004; All India Art Exhibition, South Central Zonal Cultural Centre, Nagpur, 2002

== Career ==
Karuna’s drawings, etchings and woodcuts are autobiographical anecdotes, which conglomerate sharing and bearing the space within the considerably tight compositions. The worked out vast figurative portions appears to be seizing a delusive feeling as the artist depicts the emotional attachments to materialistic world and contradictions with social realities.

At times, the figures are conceived as metaphors for nature, culture, or life, oscillating between the peripheries of real and fantastic realms. Her style features an interplay of visual narrative and skillful renderings, adroitly transposed onto printable surfaces. In this way, the burly lines and flamboyant hues surge onto the print area, and the inadvertent textures produce energies that reflect qualities of the artistic temperament.

== Awards ==
- Gold medal awarded for graphic print by Indian royal academy of art, Karnataka.
- Gold medal for graphic print, All India Art Exhibition, Zharkhand.
- State award for graphics, P.S. Telugu University, Hyderabad.
- South zone youth festival award, Chennai.
- Award for painting 77th All India Exhibition, AIFACS, New Delhi.
- Award for graphics print, All India Art Exhibition, Hyderabad Art Society.
- Award, All India Art Exhibition, South Central Zonal Cultural Centre, Nagpur.

== Exhibitions ==
=== Solo exhibitions ===
- 2009 Exhibition of drawing and prints, Kashi Art Café, Kashi Art Gallery, Cochin.
- 2008 Exhibition of paintings and drawings, at Shrishti Art Gallery funded by Pragati printers.

=== Two-person exhibitions ===
- 2011: Exhibition of paintings and prints, by Sukka Sunder and Sukka Karuna, at Shrishti Art Gallery, Hyderabad.

=== Group exhibitions ===
- 2015: "The Full Scape", the exhibition of large-scale woodcut prints by Bhaskar, Gayathri, Karuna and Laxmi Kiran at DHI Art Space, Hyderabad.
- 2015: ‘Raining consciousness and delight’, in Ailamma Art gallery, Hyderabad.
- 2015: "Woodcut 2015" at DHI Art Space, Hyderabad.
- 2014: Art @Telangana, art exhibition, at Muse Art Gallery, Hyderabad.
- 2014: "Kotha Panduga", State Gallery of Fine Arts, Hyderabad.
- 2014: "Art as Investment’, Tamkanat Art Gallery, Hyderabad.
- 2014: "Inaugural show" of Tamkanat Art Gallery, Hyderabad.
- 2013:"Genesis of Memorabilia, An Exhibition of Paintings, Ailamma Art Gallery, Hyderabad.
- 2013:"Art Jamboree 2013", conducted by Daira Center for Arts and Culture at Taj Deccan, Hyderabad.
- 2013: "Creations- old and new" An exhibition of Sculptures, paintings and prints, Art gallery, PST University, Hyderabad.
- 2013, 12: "Between the Lines: Identity, Place and Power", by Waswo X. Waswo at India Habitat Center, New Delhi, N.G.M.A, Bangalore and N.G.M.A, Mumbai.
- 2012: "Regional Art Exhibition", organized by Lalit kala Akademi, at Lalit kala Akademi Chennai.
- 2012: "Jiva" An Art Exhibition, organized by Icon Art Gallery, Hyderabad, India.
- 2012: "Art Exhibition on Bio-Diversity", organized by Department of Culture, State Gallery of Fine Arts Hyderabad, A.P.
- 2010: ‘Salt and Pepper’, an art exhibition in black and white, Icon Art Gallery, Hyderabad, India.
- 2009: ‘Friends for Ever’ an inaugural show of Icon Art Gallery, Hyderabad.
- 2009: “Taking the Line for a Walk” An exhibition of drawings, paintings, prints and installation 2009, Icon Art Gallery, Hyderabad.
- 2007: "Heart to Art", a group show of paintings, prints & sculpture at Chitramayee State Art Gallery of Fine Arts, Hyderabad.
- 2006: "Trans Local Art" An exhibition of paintings, prints and sculptures, The M.S. University, Vadodara.
- 2006: "Frozen Movements" Photography exhibition held at the Faculty of Fine Arts, The M.S. University of Baroda, Vadodara,
- 2002: "Spote” Art for peace Exhibition held at parliament of India, New Delhi.

== Collections ==
- MCHRD, Hyderabad
- Hyderabad University
- Private collections

== Personal life ==
Karuna is married to Sukka Sunder and they both has a daughter.
