= Vote Chor, Gaddi Chhod =

Political slogan used in India during the 2025 electoral controversy

Vote Chor, Gaddi Chhod (lit. 'Vote thief, leave the throne') is a political slogan that emerged during the 2025 Indian electoral controversy. It was used by the opposition Indian National Congress and its supporters to allege electoral fraud in the general election process and the collusion of the Election Commission of India (ECI) with the ruling Bharatiya Janata Party (BJP). Its underlying message calls for the resignation of the incumbent government.

== Origin and usage ==
The slogan Vote Chor, Gaddi Chhod gained prominence in mid-2025 after Congress leader Rahul Gandhi began using it during election rallies and public addresses across several Indian states. It quickly spread through social media and was adopted by various opposition figures and political activists. The phrase was prominently displayed on banners, placards, and digital campaigns during protests organised by the Indian National Congress and allied groups. It was also featured in televised debates and political discussions.

== See also ==
- 2025 Indian electoral controversy
- Rahul Gandhi
