= Vinita Vasu =

Indian artist

Vinita Vasu is a visual artist and designer residing in Delhi, India. She directed a short film named Beaming Blossom which won her a Special Festival Mention Award at the Children's International Cine Festival in the year 2016.

== Career ==
In a career spanning over a decade, Vasu has worked in paint and varied media. She paints on walls, fabrics, canvas, paper, fiberglass, bottles, boards, pebbles, and stones. Born in Kerala, and brought up in Delhi, Vasu won all the art competitions she participated in, during her school years. However, she could not pursue a degree in fine art education.

She explains that "In my works colors, shapes and patterns are used to celebrate the journey of life. Although my consciousness is the fundamental source of all my creations, it reflects the phenomenal visual experience of body, mind, and soul."

== Notable work ==
Her artworks are often a statement against negative perceptions of women from her perspective as someone who grew up in Delhi. In her own words, “There are bondages of various kinds that women everywhere face. In Delhi, where I come from, women cannot walk free at night without fear. But I look at the positive side, at the hope that these women bear rather than dwelling on the dark side.”

== Exhibitions ==
- Group Show at Bhatia Art Gallery, Noida in 2006.
- Painting Exhibition in Junior Level All India Artist at AIFACS, New Delhi In 2006.
- Painting Exhibition at AIFACS (Solo Show) in Nov. 2008.
- Group Exhibition at Art Mall, New Delhi in Jan. 2009.
- Selection in 80th and 81st Annual All India Art Exhibition at AIFACS, in 2009.
- Selected in Top 75 at All India Art Competition, Raja Ravi Varma's, Rang Rasiya in 2009.
- Solo show at Travancore Art Gallery, New Delhi, Feb. 2010.
- Selected in Painting section at AUTUMN @ CWG 2010 All India Art Exhibition cum Competition 24 September to 27 November 2010 by Gallery Indraprastha.
- Participated in "STREE" at Art Mall, New Delhi, in March 2011.
- Group Exhibition at Russian Centre of Science and Culture, New Delhi 14 September to 30 September 2011.
- Solo Show at Capitol Art Lounge, The Ashok, Chanakya Puri, New Delhi, 18 September to 14 October 2011.
- participated in International Mask Art Exhibition held at Rabindra Bhawan Art Gallery, New Delhi from 1–5 January 2012

== Thy Mistike Shi ==
Thy Mistike Shi, solo show at The Capitol Lounge, Hotel Ashoka, Chanakyapuri, 2011.
