= Lia Garcia =

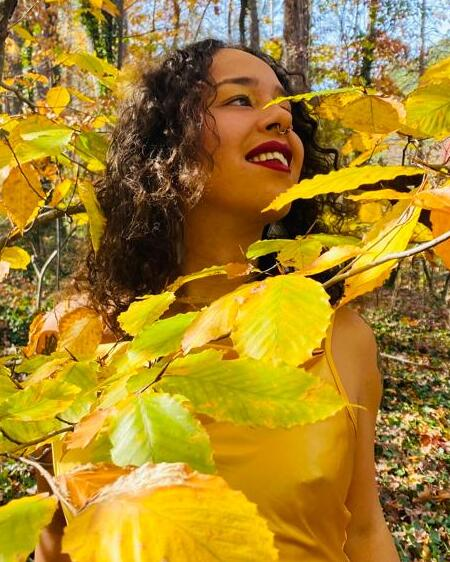
Lia Garcia (born January 24, 1989).

Lía García (born January 24, 1989) also known under the performance alias of La Novia Sirena, is an Afro-Mexican trans-feminist performance artist, educator, writer, poet, and LGBTQ+ rights advocate and organizer. She works across mediums of performance, spoken word poetry, and touch. She is currently based in Mexico City.

== About ==
She was born in 1989 in Mexico City, Mexico. She received both her bachelors and masters degree in artistic pedagogy and visual arts from the UNAM (National Autonomous University of Mexico). She helped co-found the Trans Youth Network in Mexico City with the help of Jessica Marjane. The organization is dedicated to doing activist work through a feminist lens. They raise awareness around trans issues while uplifting the lives of trans youth who transition and live in Mexico City. In 2019, she helped cofound Trans Mariqui children's literature archive with Canuto Roldán. The archive is dedicated to uplifting and preserving LGBTQ+ children's literature.

Her performance work and her work as an educator has been presented at Octubre Trans Barcelona, the Berlin University of the Arts, the University of Chile, the Faculty of Theater, El Galpón Perú, the University of Texas at Austin, and at the International Festival for Sexual Diversity (FIDS Mexico) in 2010. In more recent years she has done workshops/lectures at the University of California, Berkeley in collaboration with the Multicultural Community Center (2024-2025).

She also worked as an instructor in the department of gender studies of the National Autonomous University of Mexico (UNAM) and in conjunction with the Institution of Help and Solidarity with Street Girls (Institución Ayuda y Solidaridad con las Niñas de la Calle).

== Performance work ==
Proyecto 10bis (2016-2017)

In this performance piece, La Novia Sirena explores themes of state sponsored violence, incarceration, and dehumanization of the body. The medium she uses throughout the performance is touch, and specifically how touch can be used to humanize the incarcerated people involved in the performance who are housed in the prison facility of El Reclusorio Norte. Lía García's piece utilizes site specific performance to expand on the themes of incarceration and humanity found in her performance piece. El Reclusorio Norte is a Prison located in Mexico City, Mexico which is where Lía García lives and works. The use of the prison plays on the notions of how the state and its carceral institutions dehumanize those who inhibit the space and how touch is one of the many senses people are deprived of in the process of stripping their humanity through incarceration. Garcia combats these deprivations by using dance, touch, platonic intimacy, and vulnerability in order to reinforce the notion of humanity amongst herself as a trans woman, but also the incarcerated people she’s engaging with. She enters the prison in a traditional Quincenera dress, utilized for the Mexican coming of age festivity for young women. The use of the dress and her touch in dance with the incarcerated people is used as a vehicle to bridge the othering of the trans body and the violence of incarceration under the Mexican nation state.

Puede Besar La Novia

In this performance series, La Novia Sirena continues to expand on the thematics of touch and her gender identity as a trans woman in Mexico City. She utilizes this performance series to interact with her surrounding society and explore the intimacies and nuances of transitioning in Mexico City and how intimate touch interacts and or counteracts the preconceived notions of gender identity in Mexican society. One specific Piece within this series that highlights these nuances is "Hablar de lo que importa", where Lia Garcia enters the halls and buildings of the faculty of physics at the National Autonomous University of Mexico in a white bridal dress where she interacts with the people who cohabitate these spaces through this performance Lía García makes herself visible as a Afro-Mexican trans woman in one of the most prestigious institutions of Mexico encouraging bystanders to interact and in turn humanize their interaction through this use of touch and social interactions as a bride.

== Books ==
She has also published many children's books that feature many stories spanning around gender diverse characters and societal events like the covid-19 pandemic. Garcia's children's books are another artistic extension of her commitment to social justice and LGBTQ+ activist works in her community of Mexico.

The books she published are the following:

- Careta, caretita
- La señorona cuarentena
- Pan de Mia
- El Mitote de Los Virus Sin Corona
- El cubreboquitas que no quería tapar boquitas
