= Speaking of I.M.E.L.D.A. =

Feminist art activist group

Speaking of I.M.E.L.D.A. are a feminist-activist performance group based in London. The focus of their activism is abortion rights in Ireland, and their work built on action by the Irish Women's Abortion Support Group (IWASG) who supported women travelling to England for abortions from 1980 to 2000. The acronym I.M.E.L.D.A. stands for Ireland Making England the Legal Destination for Abortion. The group was formed in 2014 by Treasa O'Brien and Helena Walsh. Their work is a form of art intervention, and direct action. They made a series of interventions with collaborators as part of the campaign to Repeal the 8th Amendment to the Constitution of Ireland, which in 1983 legislated that the unborn foetus has equal rights to life as the mother. The amendment to legalise abortion was put to a referendum on 25 May 2018 and approved by 66.4% of voters. The groups performance interventions and use of social media have gathered widespread media attention.

== Membership ==
Founded by Treasa O'Brien and Helena Walsh in 2014, members of the group, and in direct actions include: Ann Rossiter, Sarah Cantwell, Sorcha Fhionntain, Tina McCloskey, Cristina Rios, Lynne McCarthy, Marian Larragy, Tina Ní Bhloscaidh, Anna Carnegie. Between 2014-2016 Artist Sophie Connon worked with the group to choreograph and develop the concept for No Longer the Quiet Woman and The Knickers for Choice Campaign.

== Key works ==
- The Quiet Woman (2014) is a video work that follows the actions of the group as they begin their 'Knickers for Choice' campaign. The video opens with a clip from the 1952 film The Quiet Man in which Maureen O'Hara cheerfully cleans a domestic space, singing, in a 1950s depiction of a perfect housewife. This is contrasted by footage of the group dressed in red 'cleaning' the facades of political buildings and hanging out washing lines of knickers with messages of protest on them.
- Knickers for Choice (2014–2018) began with The Quiet Woman and expanded to include many interventions performed by the group and others. They confronted the Taoiseach, Enda Kenny, with a pair of red knickers during a Fine Gael dinner in London- serving the underwear onto his plate before being removed by security. In December 2014, the group travelled to Ireland and scaled the gates outside Leinster House to hang a giant pair of red knickers on them. The message: "Women are not breeding machines. The time to Repeal the 8th is now" was written on them. A call was made for people to 'knicker bomb' public buildings, and share photographs of their knickers with pro-choice slogans on social media.
- St Patriarch's Day (2014–) An annual unauthorised intervention to the large St Patrick's Day Parade in London. Starting in 2014 the group, dressed all in red, unofficially open the parade, posing as stewards and marching at the front.
