= Billie Zangewa =

Malawian artist (born 1973)

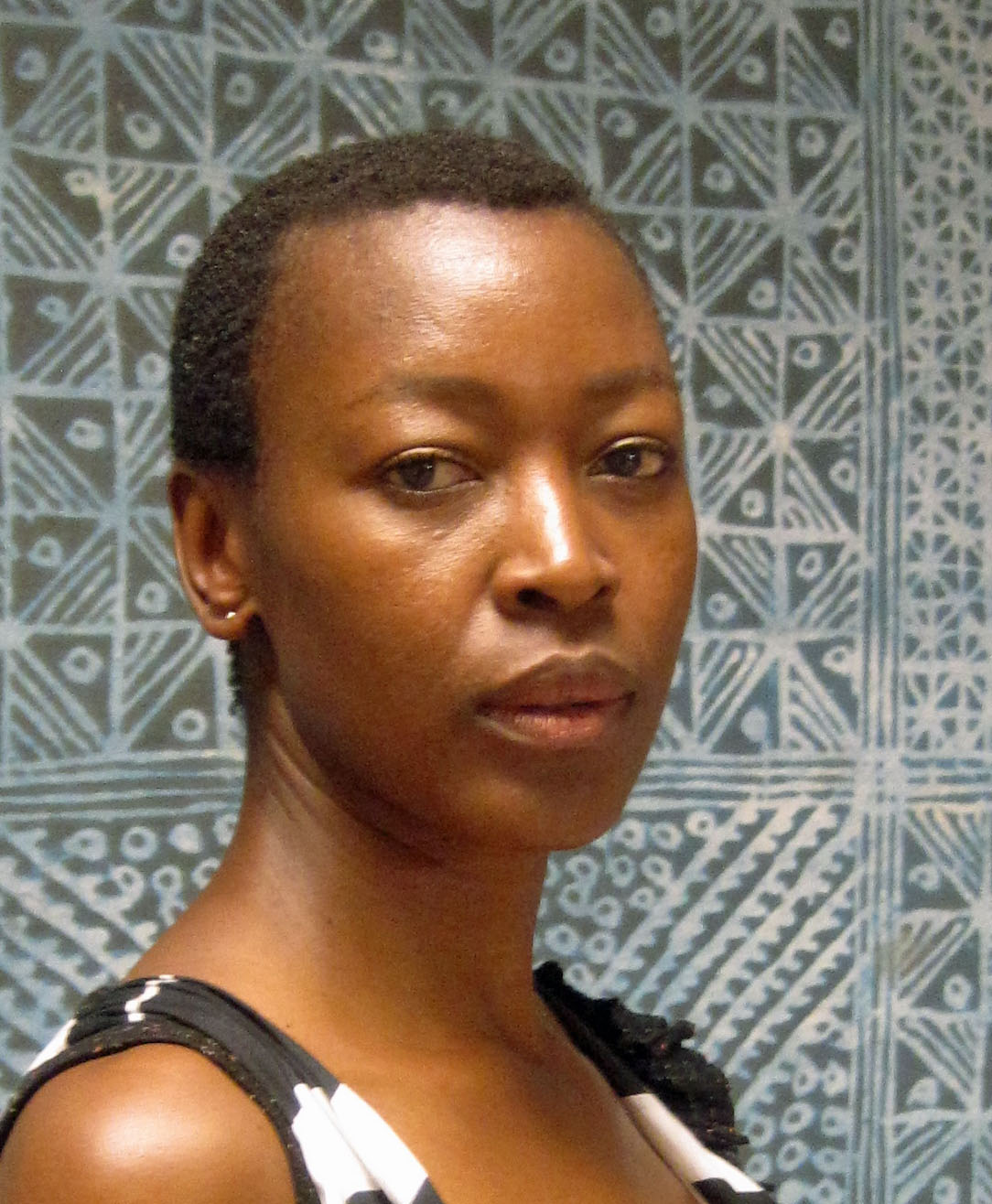
- Billie Zangewa, 2019
- Born: 1973 (age 52–53); Blantyre, Malawi
- Education: Rhodes University
- Style: Collage tapestries

Billie Zangewa (born in 1973 in Blantyre, Malawi) is a Malawian artist who hand sews silk fabrics to create collage tapestries, and who now lives in Johannesburg. Since 2004, her art has been featured in international exhibitions including the Paris Art Fair at the Grand Palais in Paris.

Zangewa's work is autobiographical and centralizes Black femininity and everyday domesticity and motherhood. She calls this "daily feminism". Her artistic approach is indicative of the artist's expressing resistance to the oppression she faces through self-love.

== Early life and education ==
She was born in 1973 in Blantyre, Malawi, and graduated with a Bachelors of Fine Arts from Rhodes University, South Africa after studying printmaking. Her mother worked in the textiles industry on sewing and embroidery. As a child she witnessed the bond between her mother and other women as they sewed, along with other domestic tasks together, which would influence the themes of motherhood in her work.

In her artistic training, she tested several modes of expression, but finally became passionate about the work of silk, both because of her interest in the fabrics, its luminosity and reflective qualities. She indicated that: "Silk has a fabulous quality of reflection but at the same time, I think it is very modern and at the forefront of fashion".

== Career ==
Working in the city of Gaborone, Botswana, then Johannesburg but also in London, she sought to translate a feminine perspective on her urban environment. She talked about her interest in fashion photography and the narrative approach, for example, of Ellen von Unwerth in her works. Zangewa's early textile work consisted of the production of patchwork handbags, using scenes taken from the city of Johannesburg. When the artist first started creating the larger-scale collages she is now well known for, she more heavily relied on the usage of text, images with a pop art influence, and, sometimes, effects including embroidery, beads, and mats on the surface of the fabric.

Zangewa's "The Rebirth of Black Venus," finished in 2010, marked a shift in the artist's subject matter. The tapestry depicts the city-scape of Johannesburg, reduced to miniature proportions in comparison to the graceful but towering figure of Zangewa, who appears nude except for a banner encircling her body. The work came at a time when Zangewa was breaking off a proposal, and signifies the commitment she made to herself, self-love that has been present and recurring in much of her work ever since.

== Materials used ==
Billie Zangewa works primarily with raw silk offcuts in intricate hand-stitched collages, creating figurative compositions that explore her intersectional identity in the contemporary context and challenge the historical stereotyping, objectification and exploitation of the black female body. Working in a flat, colourful style, she depicts narratives concerned with experience: both personal and universal. These narratives do not make grand gestures or even overt political statements, but rather focus on mundane domestic preoccupations; universal themes connecting us to each other. Almost always the protagonist in her works, Zangewa becomes a heroine whose daily life is revealed through the scenes she illustrates. Her son, Mika, also features in a work entitled Temporary Reprieve.

While Zangewa initially turned to textile arts out of the affordability and easy transportability of the medium, the fabric she uses soon became integral to her art. Zangewa finds importance in the everyday practicality of fabric that brings something familiar into her work and parallels the focus on appreciating domesticity. The process of refining silk especially resonates with the artist for its associations with metamorphosis.

Zangewa's finished tapestries celebrate imperfection with their raw, irregular edges and often large pieces seemingly cut out of the tapestry that seem to impede on the scene. This tactic also works to break any illusions of the work being painted on canvas.

== Exhibitions and recognition ==
In 2020, Templon in Paris presented a solo exhibition of work by the artist, titled Soldier of Love, which explored the themes of domesticity, femininity, and love. Speaking with Jareh Das in Ocula Magazine, the artist explained, 'I feel that at present, we live in a time blighted by a lot of violence and transgression in different forms that we inflict on one other as a society. We hear about it on the news every day. I believe that it is because we do not prioritise love, and that if we did, most of the suffering in the world would come to an end and we would find healing.'

Zangewa's 2014 work Constant Gardener is owned by the Smithsonian's National Museum of African Art in Washington, D C. The textured printing paper awakened her interest in the materiality of surfaces, and when she moved to Johannesburg she found her muse: the city. She uses self-referentiality as a conceptual framework within which to epitomize the contemporary African woman and contribute to her redefinition in societies in which patriarchy and reactionary views continue to work against the liberation of women. Although her tapestries are autobiographical, she finds recourse in the shaping of a collective identity, as in Midnight Aura and Angelina Rising-titles that reference the names given to wax prints by the Dutch fabric company Vlisco. The African woman depicted in Zangewa's tapestries, who has "experienced modernity" in the words of Yinka Shonibare MBE, has had to reclaim herself: passive and subjected to the desires of men, she has become the agent of seduction performed as a conscious and voluntary act.

In 2018, Zangewa was the featured artist for the annual FNB JoburgArtFair. In 2019, Zangewa was included in the show I Am… Contemporary Women Artists of Africa at the National Museum of African Art.

Zangewa is included in the book Vitamin T: Threads and Textiles in Contemporary Art (Phaidon, 2019), ISBN 0714876615.

In late 2021 through early 2022, Zangewa's solo exhibit Billie Zangewa: Thread for a Web Begun was held at the Museum of the African Diaspora in San Francisco.

== Video Interviews ==
1. Artist Billie Zangewa - The Ultimate Act of Resistance is Self-Love
2. Open Air: Artist Talk with Billie Zangewa
3. FNB JoburgArtFair Conversations: Billie Zangewa, 2018 Featured Artist
