= Kruttika Susarla =

Indian comic book writer, illustrator and graphics designer

Kruttika Susarla is an Indian comic maker, illustrator and graphic designer, from Andhra Pradesh, India. Her works have been described as observations of the status quo, and versatile in style, ranging from the use of minimalistic graphics to detailed sketches, and have become known for highlighting social causes including those of feminism, gender issues, LGBTQ issues, and issues of other marginalised sections of society.

Susarla graduated from the DJ Academy of Design in Coimbatore, Tamil Nadu, and from Sam Fox School of Design & Visual Arts. She has been involved in a number of collaborations including those with organisations such as the Mumbai based Point of View and the YP Foundation. Her project The Feminist Alphabet came out of 36 Days of Type, an annual call for various designers and artists to share work on Instagram related to a theme; Verve wrote that the project "took Instagram by storm". She was commissioned by The Caravan magazine to illustrate women in ancient Indian literature for Samhita Arni's essay 'Her Story'.
