= Pabiben Rabari =

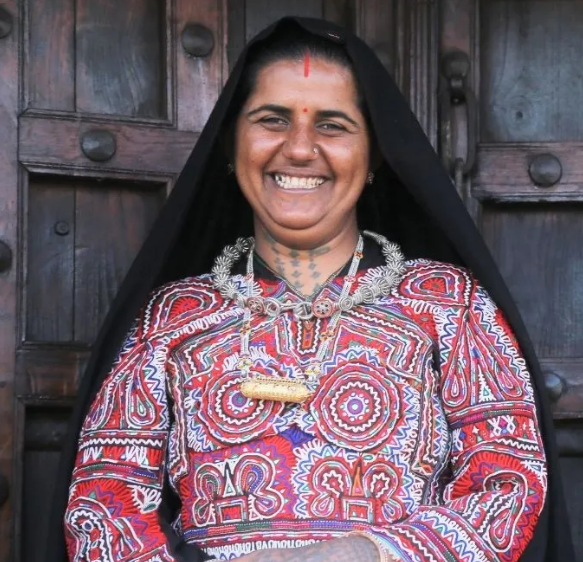
Pabiben Rabari

Pabiben Rabari is an Indian embroiderer from Bhadroi village in Anjar taluka, Kutch, Gujarat. She began her embroidery work at an early age and later invented a new embroidery art form called Hari Jari. Rabari also founded a company to produce a line of shopping bags called the Pabi Bag, which has been featured in several Bollywood and Hollywood movies.

== Early life ==
Pabiben dropped out of school after completing standard IV and later she started working in embroidery.

== Participation & design selection ==
- Design Selected for Hollywood film "The Other End of The Line"
- Pabiben’s design has been selected for Bollywood film "Luck by Chance"
- Selection for Santa Fe Folk Art Festival, Santa Fe, USA, Year 2013
- Participate in International Buyer Seller Meet, Ahmedabad, Year 2015
- Participate in Design Workshop with Vietnamese artisans in Delhi
- Participate in theme based exhibition-Kutch center of the world at India International Centre, New Delhi.
