= Ketaki Pimpalkhare =

Indian painter

- Born: Pune, India
- Education: Abhinav Kala Vidyalaya, S.N.D.T
- Known for: Painting, Drawing, Sculpture
- Website: ketakipimpalkhare.in

Ketaki Pimpalkhare (25 September 1977) is an Indian painter. Pimpalkahre has been experimenting with different mediums like oils, acrylics, charcoal and has worked with ceramic sculpture, tar, environmental, land and video art. Pimpalkhare has exhibited solo and group in India and also internationally.

== Personal life ==
Pimpalkhare was born in Pune, Maharashtra. Pimpalkhare completed her undergraduate degree in Fine Art from the Directorate of Art, Bombay's G.D. Art program. During her undergraduate degree she studied photography from Fergusson College, Pune. Pimpalkhare then moved to the UK for a brief period and studied Creative Writing at SouthShields. She moved back to India and got a Masters in Fine Arts from. Women’s University, Pune and worked in the field of advertising and event management. She started painting when she got pregnant and eventually started showing her work in art galleries from the year 1999 in Pune, Mumbai and internationally. She lives and works in Pune and is married to a restaurateur Shekhar Pimpalkhare and has a son.

== Media citations ==
Several of Pimpalkhare's works were published in reputable journals and news dailys.

Paintings auctioned at the Christie's London

Her painting "Underwater" was featured by New Indian Express daily.

An exhibition Spirit and Matter at Shrishti Art Gallery displayed Pimpalkhare's work

India Today has covered her story among 5 other artists with the title of "Five visionaries from Pune tell you what's on their New Year wishlist"

Featured in "12 thought-provoking art shows in India on through April 2022"
