= Conflictorium =

Indian museum

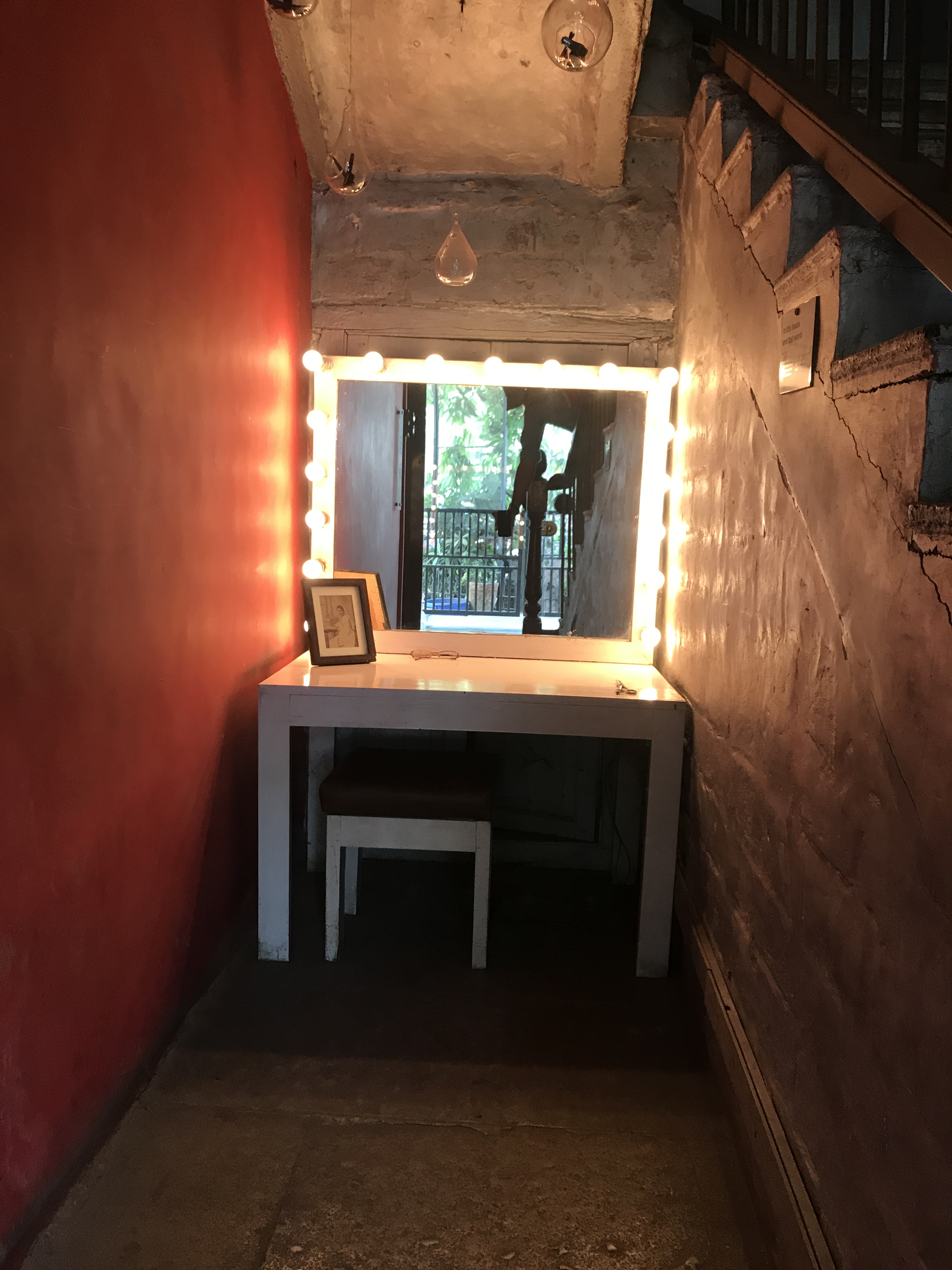
The Conflictorium Museum

The Conflictorium is a museum in Mirzapur, Ahmedabad, in the Indian state of Gujarat. It was opened on 14 April 2013, and it was designed by Avni Sethi as a part of her final project. The building was originally known as The Gool Lodge, which was owned by Bachuben Nagarwala, a Parsi lady and the first trained beautician and hairstylist of Ahmedabad. This two-storey building has now been divided into several galleries, each presenting a different form expression of people's voices and thoughts.

== History ==
The city of Ahmedabad is divided into two parts by the Sabarmati River - The Progressive West or the new city and The Historical East or the old city. The old city is also associated as a trigger for most conflicts that occur in Ahmedabad city. According to the designer of the Conflictorium Avni Sethi, who also had a first hand experience of such conflicts, the building was situated in a location which not only put it at the heart of such conflicts but also acted as bridge between the two contrasting sides of the city. The Conflictorium was thus formed by Avni Sethi in collaboration with Janvikas, Centre for Social Justice and Navsarjan.

== Purpose ==
The Conflictorium acts as a space that enables different section of the society to engage in various topics of conflict through artistic and creative ways. The Conflictorium was founded with the intention of educating the community about conflict through alternative forms of art and culture. The goal was to look at conflict from a different angle than it typically was, to look past its tragic past. Through this the museum aims to show that conflicts are necessary in a society as it helps it grow into an ideal society. Visitors are encouraged to experience the exhibits through their five senses.

== Location ==
Within the 500m radius of the museum lies the Chalte Peer Ki Dargah, the Sai Baba Temple and the CNI Church. The District Court is present down the road and the first Technical College opposite The Conflictorium. The Bhadra Fort and Ahmad Shah's Tomb are also in the vicinity.

The Sardar Vallabhbhai Patel International Airport is 6 km from the museum. The Ahmedabad Junction is 2.1 km from the Conflictorium, if visitors wish to transit via train. Other local transport such as autos and taxis also available.

The Conflictorium is open daily except on Mondays, and entry is free of charge.

== Design ==
=== Conflict timeline ===
It is the first part of the museum which chronicles the violent and oppressive past of the state of Gujarat since its inception in 1960.

=== Gallery of Disputes ===
This section was designed by Mansi Thakkar. The main aim of this section is to highlight different types of disputes and their root causes within the framework of our social structure. The animal world has been personified here and the gallery follows the story of a Donkey. It draws inspiration from the animal fables of 'Panchatantra' by Vishnu Sharma and fictional stories like 'Animal Farm' by George Orwell As the visitor walks through the gallery, the story unfolds through the use of various sensory mediums like sounds, props, animations, light and shadows.

=== Empathy Alley ===
This is a room right after the Gallery of Disputes which deals with a similar theme as the previous section. Here the section attempts to look at the nation and the thought-leaders involved in the process of nation-building. Silhouettes of political figures like Mahatma Gandhi, B. R. Ambedkar, Jawaharlal Nehru, Mohammed Ali Jinnah, Sardar Vallabhbhai Patel and Indulal Yagnik. Every figure is accompanied with a speech in their original voice and it expresses their ideological views in a post-independent India.

=== Moral Compass ===
This is the next room in the museum where a copy of the Indian Constitution is present. It is a pre 1977 version and visitors are freely allowed to engage with the book. It attempts to make the constitution accessible to the general public as the knowledge of the constitution rights is essential for every citizen.

=== Memory Lab ===
The section of "Memory Lab" is an art installation in collaboration with the visitor community. Simple pickle jars are placed on shelves with little tags. Here visitors can pen down stories or thoughts on some personal conflicts they have faced and preserve the memory in an interpersonal setting.

=== In this House and That World ===
Located under the stairwell, it is a sound installation that talks about the original owner of the building, Bachuben Nagarwala. It takes an intimate look into her life and presents the layered history of the building itself.

=== Sorry Tree ===
This section marks the end of the museum ground floor. The peepal tree outside the Conflictorium has been turned into the 'Sorry Tree'. Here Visitors can hand a 'I am Sorry' card and write a letter for certain events for which they feel apologetic towards.

=== Additional features ===
The museum consists of two floors. The gallery spaces on the ground floor are fixed, meaning the display will not change. The first floor hosts an exhibition space, leased for about a month-and-half, where workshops, exhibitions, talks and shows are held. The first floor also has a 4-seater auditorium. The back and front yard are utilised for exhibits and performances. Paid residencies are also given out for two residents at once. These residents can then interact with the exhibits, the audience and the museum very closely.
