= Adivasi Lok Kala Academy =

- Formation: 1980
- Type: Zonal Cultural Centre
- Purpose: Education, preservation and promotion of arts and culture
- Location: Madhya Pradesh, India

Aadivasi Lok Kala Academy is a cultural institution established by Government of Madhya Pradesh in 1980 with the objective of encouraging, preserving and developing the tribal arts.

It conducts surveys, organizes programs and publishes texts and materials on tribal folk arts. It also organises many festival related to the tribal arts and folk theater, main being Lok Rang, Ram Leela Mela, Nimad Utsav, Sampada and Shruti Samaroh. The academy has set up Aadivart museum on tribal and folk arts and Saket, Ramayan Kala Museum at Orchha.It also organizes festivals related to Sant Tulsidas – Tulsi Utsava, Tulsi Jayanti Samaroh and Mangalacharan.

== Administration and Activities ==
- Current director of the organisation is Dr Kapil Tiwari.
- In January 2021 the organisation conducted Lokrang festival inaugurated by state Chief Minister.
