= Patua =

South Asian artisan community

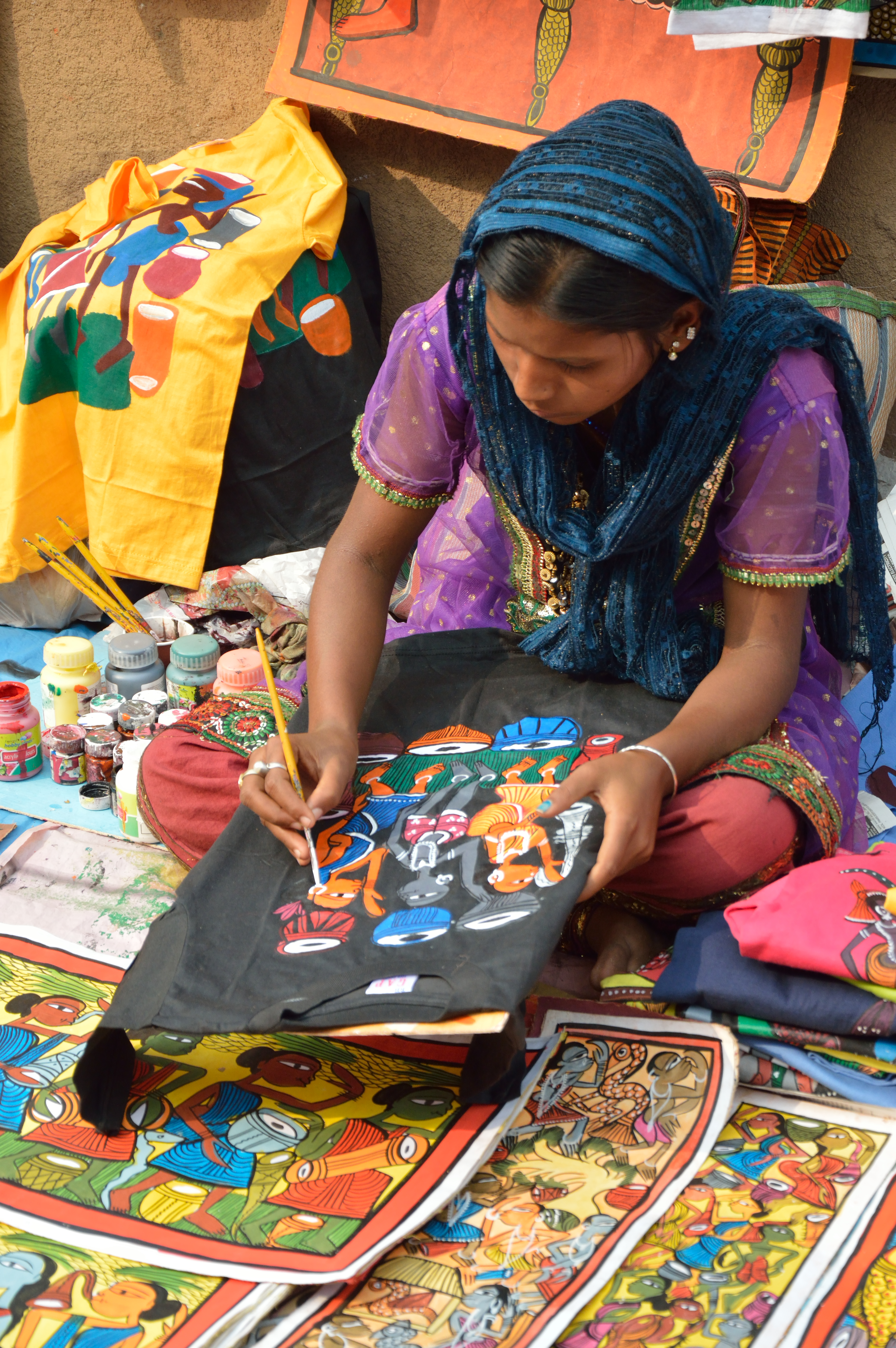
A Patua working at the International Kolkata Book Fair 2013 that held at Milan Mela complex, Kolkata.

The Patua (/ˈpætʊə/; Bengali: পটুয়া [ˈpɔtuwaˑ]) are an artisan community found in the state of West Bengal, Bihar, Jharkhand and Odisha in India and parts of Bangladesh. Some Patuas are Hindus, while others are Muslims. Hindu Patuas are active in the Kalighat and Kumartuli regions of Calcutta, along with some other parts of West Bengal, where they are reduced in number. It is believed that most Patuas are actually converts from Hinduism to Islam. Today, they practice customs that are both Hindu and Islamic in nature. They may have also been Buddhist at various points in time. Today, however, the majority of them are impoverished Muslims who rely on patronage from mainly Hindus, but also increasingly from tourists who buy their painted scrolls, as Frank J. Korom has described and analysed in his book Village of Painters: Narrative Scrolls from West Bengal (2006. Santa Fe: Museum of New Mexico Press).

Scholars argue that the Patuas, were originally Hindus, were cast out of the Hindu society for not following canonical proceedings in pursuing their trade. Patuas are also known Patigar or Chitrakar.

== Origin ==
Although Chitrakars origin is difficult to be precisely determined, historical and mythological memories coincide that their existence is traceable to the 13th century. Different accounts explain their standing in the Indian caste system. The Patua are a unique community, in that their traditional occupation is the painting and modelling of Hindu idols, yet many of them are Muslims. Their name Patua is a corruption of the Bengali word Pota, which means an engraver. They are also widely known as Chitrakar, which literally means a scroll painter. There are a number of theories as to the origin of this community, one which relates to the fact that they were cast out when they fell out with their Brahmin priests. They seem to be one of a number of tribal groupings found in the Midnapore Region that were over time Islamized. They are mentioned both in Hindu, Buddhist or Islamic classic or historical literature, as they moved back and forth from Hinduism and Buddhism to Islam. The Patuas paid little attention to faith, while looking for patronage. Chitrakars themselves might have converted to Islam as a strategy to avoid the oppression by a hierarchy of subcastes created during the Sen Dynasty. This was an extremely slow process with the Patuas, as seen by the fact that every Patua has two names, one Hindu and one Muslim.

Patuas, like the Kumars, started out in the village tradition as painters of scrolls or pats telling the popular mangal stories of the gods and goddesses. For generations, these scroll painters or patuas have gone from village to village with their scrolls or pat singing stories in return for money or food. Many come from the Midnapore of West Bengal or else from the 24 Parganas and Bhirbhum, Murshidabad also. The pats or scrolls are made of sheets of paper of equal or different sizes which are sewn together and painted with ordinary poster paints. Originally they would have been painted on cloth and used to tell religious stories such as the medieval mangal poems. Today they may be used to comment on social and political issues such as the evils of cinema or the promotion of literacy.

== Present circumstances ==
The Patua are found mainly in the districts of Murshidabad in West Bengal. Some villages where there are communities of Patuas include - Karbelia, Panchthupi, Kandi, Gokarna, Amlai, Dokshinkhanda, Jhilli, etc.

Midnapore, Bhirbhum, Bankura, 24 Parganas, Howrah, Hooghly and Purulia. In Bihar they are mainly found in the Magahi and Maithili speaking regions as well as in the adjoining regions of Jharkhand. In Bengal they are a Bengali speaking community, with little or no knowledge of Urdu. The community is strictly endogamous, and prefer cross-cousin marriages. The Patuas visit villages and go from house to house with their bags of scrolls. They narrate stories while unrolling the scrolls; in return of their services they are paid in cash or kind.

The traditional occupation of the Patua is scroll painting, image making and other decorative work. They paint pictures on coarse pieces of cloth, depicting images of Hindu gods and goddesses. These paintings are referred to as Patas (পট). Like other Muslim artisan groups in India, they have seen a decline in their traditional occupation. The majority are now employed as daily wage labourers.

The Patua are Sunni Muslims, but incorporate many folk beliefs. Those involved in idol making are generally less orthodox then other Patuas. Muslim rituals mark all their important ceremonies, but they paint Hindu stories in their scrolls and also observe a number of Hindu festivals.

== See also ==
- Lodha Muslims
