= Om =

Sacred sound in Indian religions

Om ligature in Devanagari script

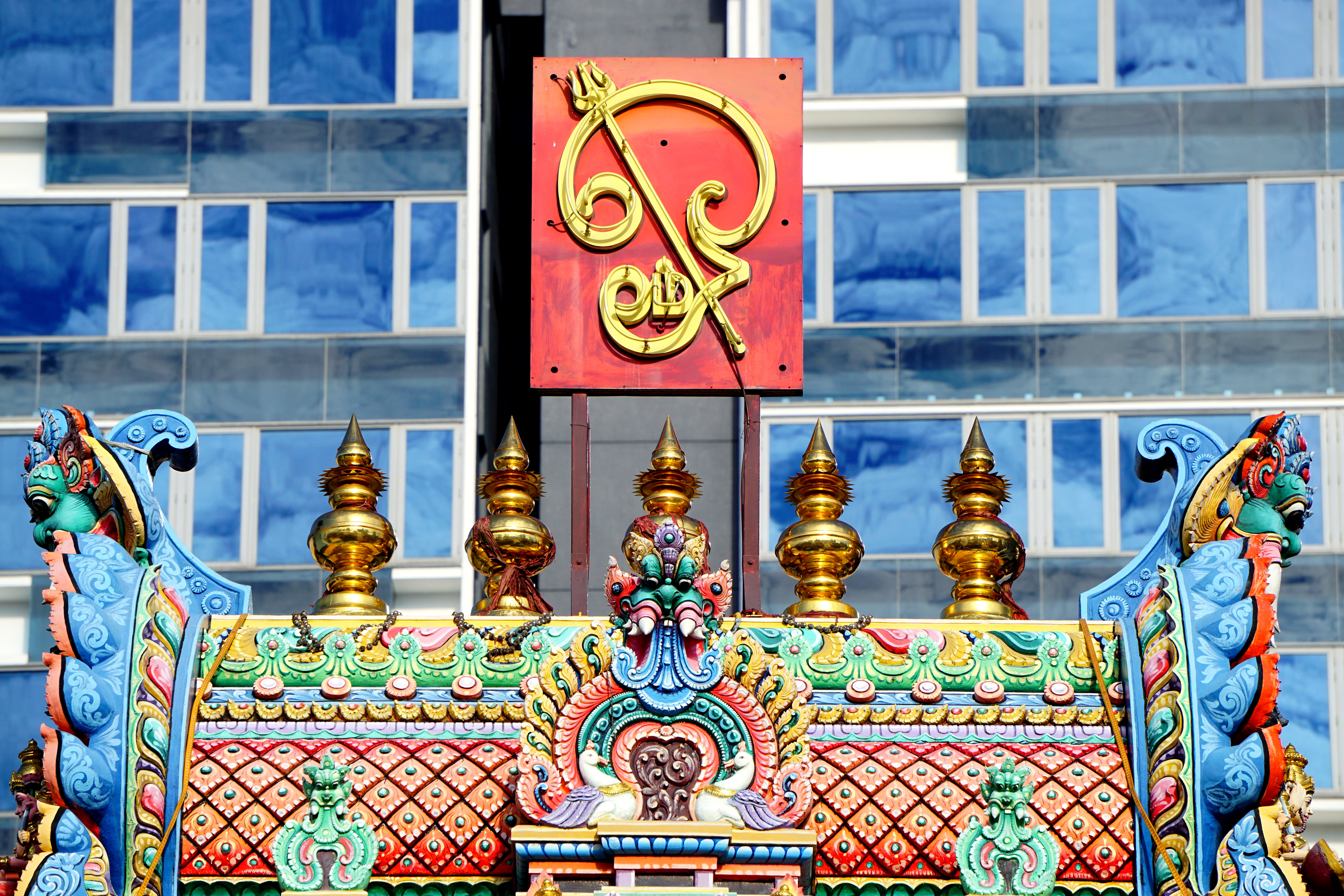
Om (ௐ) in Tamil script with a trishula at Sri Veeramakaliamman Temple, Singapore; Om appears frequently as an icon in temples (kovils) and spiritual retreats

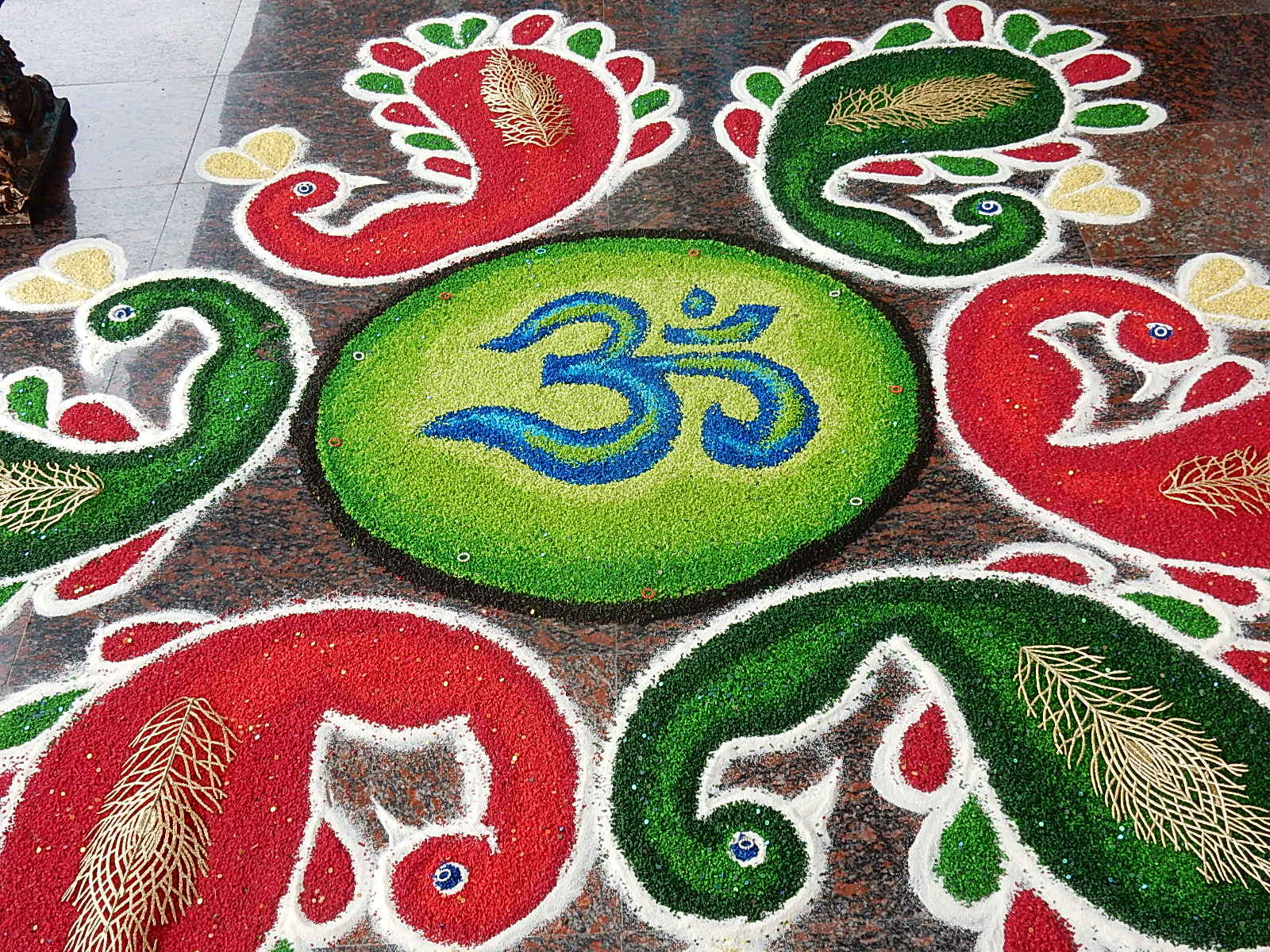
A rangoli featuring Om surrounded by stylised peacocks; Om often features prominently in the religious art and iconography of Indian religions

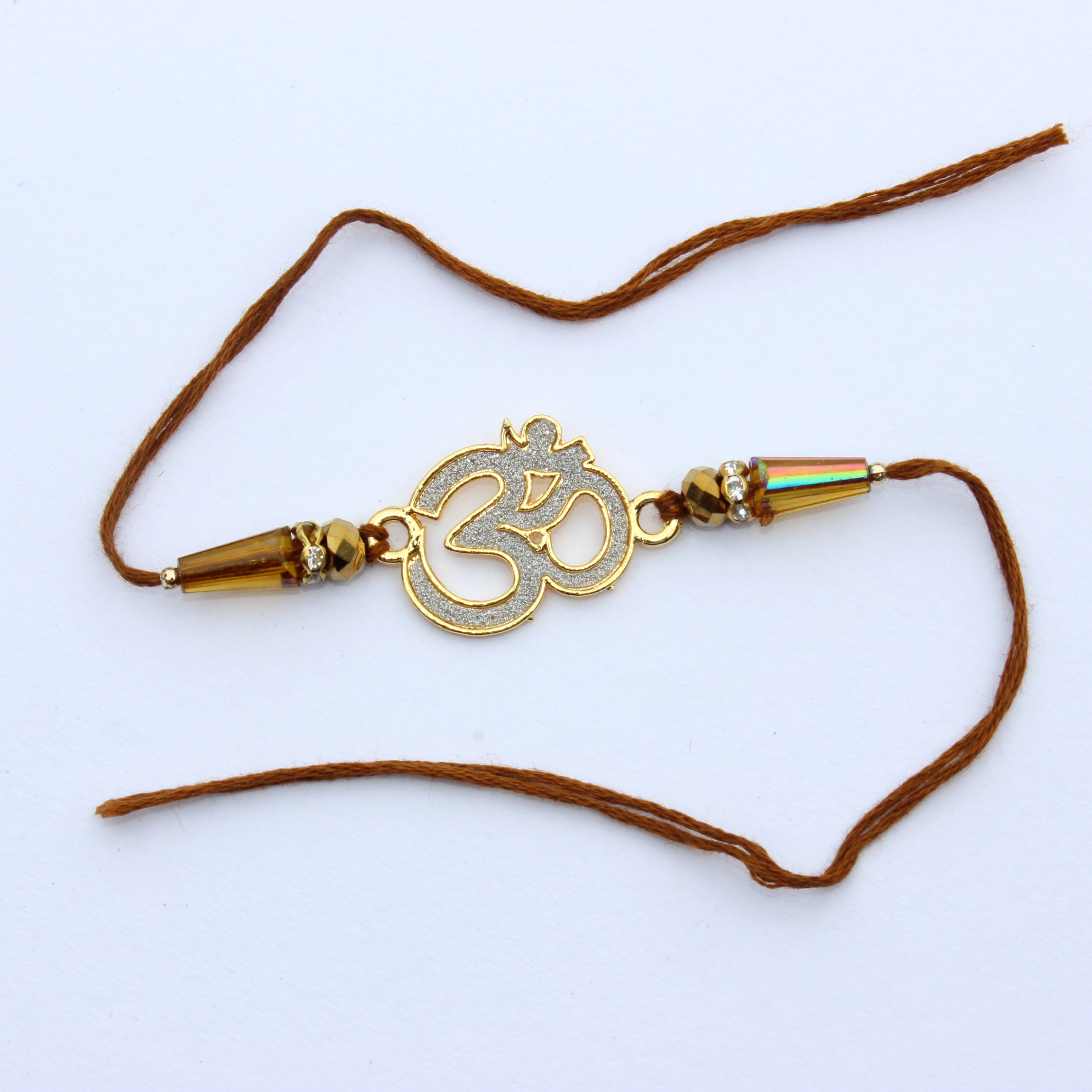
A rakhi in the shape of Om

Om (or Aum;; Sanskrit: ॐ, ओं, ओम्, romanized: Oṃ, ISO 15919: Ōṁ) is a polysemous symbol, a sacred sound, seed syllable, mantra, and invocation in Buddhism, Hinduism, Jainism and Sikhism. Its written form is the most important symbol in Hinduism. It is the essence of the supreme Absolute, consciousness, Ātman, Brahman, or the cosmic world. In Indian religions, Om serves as a sonic representation of the divine, a standard of Vedic authority and a central aspect of soteriological doctrines and practices. It is the basic tool for meditation in the yogic path to liberation. The syllable is often found at the beginning and the end of chapters in the Vedas, the Upanishads, and other Hindu texts. It is described as the goal of all the Vedas.

Om emerged in the Vedic corpus and is considered an encapsulated form of Samavedic chants or songs. It is a sacred spiritual incantation made before and during the recitation of spiritual texts, during puja and private prayers, in ceremonies of rites of passage (samskara) such as weddings, and during meditative and spiritual activities such as Pranava yoga. It is part of the iconography found in ancient and medieval era manuscripts, temples, monasteries, and spiritual retreats in Indian religions. As a syllable, it is often chanted either independently or before a spiritual recitation and during meditation in Hinduism, Buddhism, and Jainism.

The syllable Om is also referred to as Onkara (Omkara) and Pranava among many other names.

== Common names and synonyms ==
The syllable Om is referred to by many names, including:

- Praṇava (प्रणव); literally, "fore-sound", referring to Om as the primeval sound.
- Oṅkāra (ओङ्कार) or oṃkāra (ओंकार); literally, "Om-maker", denoting the first source of the sound Om and connoting the act of creation.
  - Ik Oṅkār (ੴ or ਇੱਕ ਓਅੰਕਾਰ); literally, "one Om-maker", and an epithet of God in Sikhism. (see below).
- Udgītha (उद्गीथ); meaning "song, chant", a word found in Samaveda and bhasya (commentaries) based on it. It is also used as a name of the syllable Om in Chandogya Upanishad.
- Akṣara (अक्षर); literally, "imperishable, immutable", and also "letter of the alphabet" or "syllable".
  - Ekākṣara; literally, "one letter of the alphabet", referring to its representation as a single ligature. (see below)

== Origin and spiritual significance ==
The etymological origins of ōm (aum) have long been discussed and disputed, with even the Upanishads having proposed multiple Sanskrit etymologies for aum, including: from "ām" (आम्; "yes"), from "ávam" (आवम्; "that, thus, yes"), and from the Sanskrit roots "āv-" (अव्; "to urge") or "āp-" (आप्; "to attain"). (Note: Praṇava Upaniṣad in Gopatha Brāhmaṇa 1.1.26 and Uṇādisūtra 1.141/1.142) In 1889, Maurice Bloomfield proposed an origin from a Proto-Indo-European introductory particle "*au" with a function similar to the Sanskrit particle "atha" (अथ). However, contemporary Indologist Asko Parpola proposes a borrowing from Dravidian "*ām" meaning "'it is so', 'let it be so', 'yes'", a contraction of "*ākum", cognate with modern Tamil "ām" (ஆம்) meaning "yes". In the Jaffna Tamil dialect spoken in Sri Lanka, aum' is the word for yes.

Om emerged in the Vedic corpus and is considered an encapsulated form of Samavedic chants or songs. The Samaveda, the poetical Veda, orthographically maps Om to the audible, the musical truths in its numerous variations (Oum, Aum, Ovā Ovā Ovā Um, etc.) and then attempts to extract musical meters from it. The Aitareya Brahmana of Rig Veda, in section 5.32, suggests that the three phonetic components of Om (a + u + m) correspond to the three stages of cosmic creation, and when it is read or said, it celebrates the creative powers of the universe. However, regardless of its original meaning, the syllable Om evolves to mean many abstract ideas even in the earliest Upanishads. Max Müller and other scholars state that these philosophical texts recommend Om as a basic tool for meditation and explain the various meanings that the syllable may hold in the mind of one meditating, ranging from "artificial and senseless" to the "highest concepts such as the cause of the Universe, essence of life, Brahman, Atman, and Self-knowledge".

In the Aranyaka and the Brahmana layers of Vedic texts, the syllable is so widespread and linked to knowledge, that it stands for the "whole of Veda". The Brahmana layer of Vedic texts equates Om with bhur-bhuvah-svah, which symbolizes "the whole Veda". They offer various shades of meaning to Om, such as it being "the universe beyond the sun", or that which is "mysterious and inexhaustible", or "the infinite language, the infinite knowledge", or "essence of breath, life, everything that exists", or that "with which one is liberated". The symbolic foundations of Om are repeatedly discussed in the oldest layers of the early Upanishads. In the Upanishads, it has been associated with various concepts, such as "cosmic sound", "mystical syllable", "affirmation to something divine", or as symbolism for abstract spiritual concepts. However, in the eight anuvaka of the Taittiriya Upanishad, which consensus research indicates was formulated around the same time or preceding Aitareya Brahmana, the sound Aum is attributed to reflecting the inner part of the word Brahman. Put another way, it is the Brahman, in the form of a word.

== Pronunciation ==
When occurring within spoken Classical Sanskrit, the syllable is subject to the normal rules of sandhi in Sanskrit grammar, with the additional peculiarity that the initial o of "Om" is the guṇa vowel grade of u, not the vṛddhi grade, and is therefore pronounced as a monophthong with a long vowel ([oː]), i.e. ōm not aum. (Note: see Pāṇini, Aṣṭādhyāyī 6.1.95) Furthermore, the final m is often assimilated into the preceding vowel as nasalisation (raṅga). As a result, Om is regularly pronounced [õː] in the context of Sanskrit.

However, this o reflects the older Vedic Sanskrit diphthong au, which at that stage in the language's history had not yet monophthongised to o. This being so, the syllable Om is often archaically considered as consisting of three phonemes: "a-u-m". Accordingly, some denominations maintain the archaic diphthong au viewing it to be more authentic and closer to the language of the Vedas.

In the context of the Vedas, particularly the Vedic Brahmanas, the vowel is often pluta ("three times as long"), indicating a length of three morae (trimātra), that is, the time it takes to say three light syllables. Additionally, a diphthong becomes pluta with the prolongation of its first vowel. When e and o undergo pluti they typically revert to the original diphthongs with the initial a prolonged, realised as an overlong open back unrounded vowel (ā̄um or a3um [ɑːːum]). This extended duration is emphasised by denominations who regard it as more authentically Vedic, such as Arya Samaj.

However, Om is also attested in the Upanishads without pluta, (Note: see Māṇḍūkya Upaniṣad 8-12, composed in Classical Sanskrit, which describes Om as having three mātras corresponding to the three letters a-u-m) and many languages related to or influenced by Classical Sanskrit, such as Hindustani, share its pronunciation of Om ([õː] or [oːm]).

== Written representations ==
=== Indian Subcontinent ===
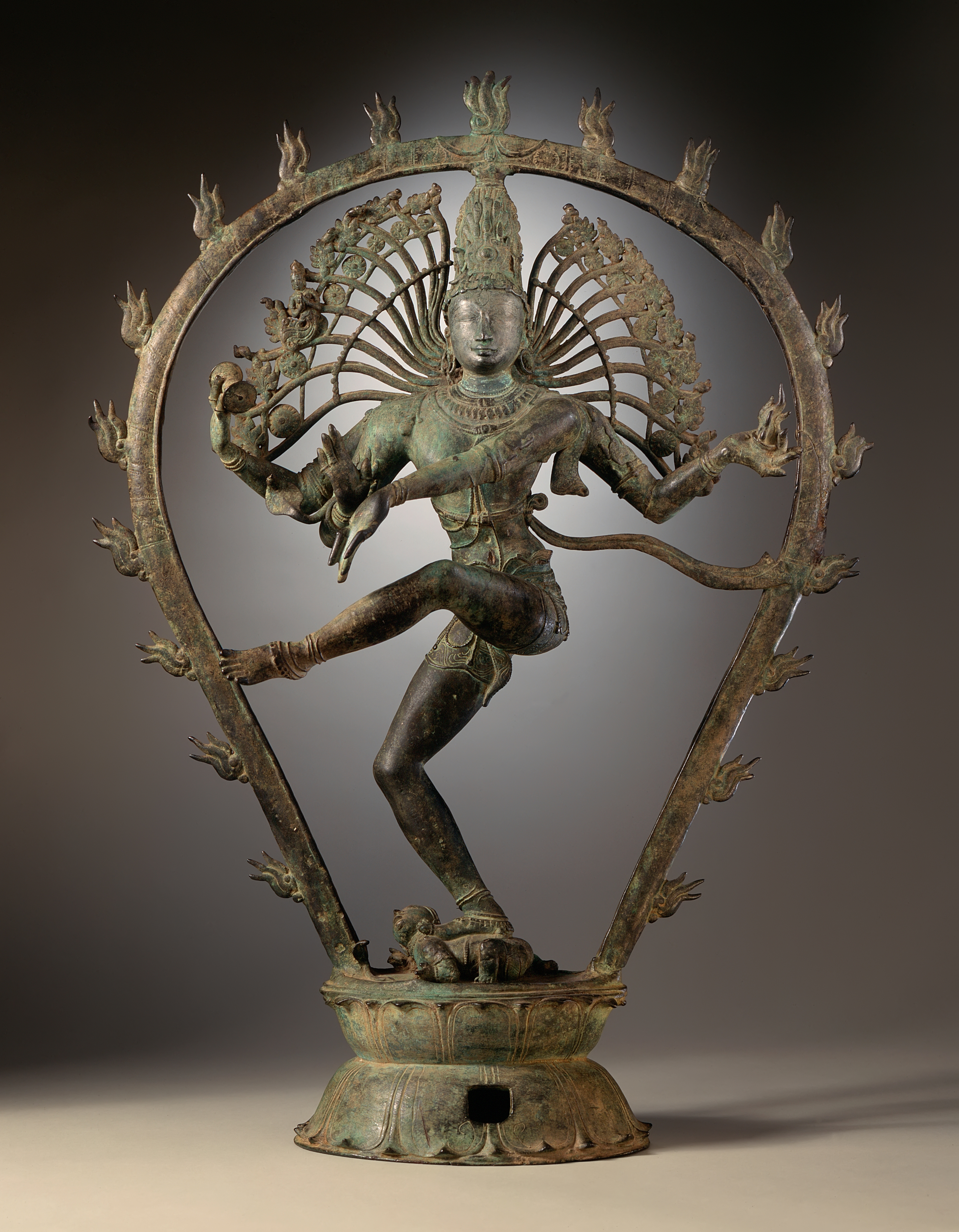
Statue depicting Shiva as the Nataraja dancing in a posture resembling the Devangari ligature for Om; Joseph Campbell argued that the Nataraja statue represents Om as a symbol of the entirety of "consciousness, universe" and "the message that God is within a person and without"

Nagari or Devanagari representations are found epigraphically on sculpture dating from Medieval India and on ancient coins in regional scripts throughout South Asia. Om is represented in Devanagari as ओम्, composed of four elements: the vowel letter अ (a), the vowel diacritic ो (o), the consonant letter म (m), and the virama stroke ् which indicates the absence of an implied final vowel. Historically, the combination ओ represented a diphthong, often transcribed as au, but it now represents a long vowel, ō. (See above.) The syllable is sometimes written ओ३म्, where ३ (i.e., the digit "3") explicitly indicates pluta ('three times as long') which is otherwise only implied. For this same reason Om may also be written ओऽम् in languages such as Hindi, with the avagraha (ऽ) being used to indicate prolonging the vowel sound. (However, this differs from the usage of the avagraha in Sanskrit, where it would instead indicate the prodelision of the initial vowel.) Om may also be written ओं, with an anusvāra reflecting the pronunciation of [õː] in languages such as Sanskrit and Hindi. In languages such as Urdu and Sindhi Om may be written اوم in Arabic script, although speakers of these languages may also use Devanagari representations.

The commonly seen representation of the syllable Om, ॐ, is a cursive ligature in Devanagari, combining अ (a) with उ (u) and the chandrabindu (ँ, ṃ). In Unicode, the symbol is encoded at U+0950 ॐ DEVANAGARI OM and at U+1F549 🕉 OM SYMBOL as a "generic symbol independent of Devanagari font".

In some South Asian writing systems, the Om symbol has been simplified further. In Bengali and Assamese Om is written simply as ওঁ without an additional curl. In languages such as Bengali differences in pronunciation compared to Sanskrit have made the addition of a curl for u redundant. Although the spelling is simpler, the pronunciation remains [õː]. Similarly, in Odia Om is written as ଓଁ without an additional diacritic.

In Tamil, Om is written as ௐ, a ligature of ஓ (ō) and ம் (m), while in Kannada, Telugu, and Malayalam, Om is written simply as the letter for ō followed by anusvāra (ಓಂ, ఓం, and ഓം, respectively).

There have been proposals that the Om syllable may already have had written representations in Brahmi script, dating to before the Common Era. A proposal by Deb (1921) held that the swastika is a monogrammatic representation of the syllable Om, wherein two Brahmi /o/ characters (U+11011 𑀑 BRAHMI LETTER O) were superposed crosswise and the 'm' was represented by dot. A commentary in Nature (1922) considers this theory questionable and unproven. A. B. Walawalkar (1951) proposed that Om was represented using the Brahmi symbols for "A", "U", and "M" (𑀅𑀉𑀫), and that this may have influenced the unusual epigraphical features of the symbol ॐ for Om. Parker (1909) wrote that an "Aum monogram", distinct from the swastika, is found among Tamil-Brahmi inscriptions in Sri Lanka, including Anuradhapura era coins, dated from the 1st to 4th centuries CE, which are embossed with Om along with other symbols.

=== East and Southeast Asia ===
The Om symbol, with epigraphical variations, is also found in many Southeast Asian countries.

In Southeast Asia, the Om symbol is widely conflated with that of the unalome; originally a representation of the Buddha's urna curl and later a symbol of the path to nirvana, it is a popular yantra in Southeast Asia, particularly in Cambodia and Thailand. It frequently appears in sak yant religious tattoos, and has been a part of various flags and official emblems such as in the Thong Chom Klao of King Rama IV (r. 1851–1868) and the present-day royal arms of Cambodia.

The Khmer adopted the symbol since the 1st century during the Kingdom of Funan, where it is also seen on artefacts from Angkor Borei, once the capital of Funan. The symbol is seen on numerous Khmer statues from Chenla to Khmer Empire periods and still in used until the present day.

In Chinese characters, Om is typically transliterated as either 唵 (pinyin: ǎn) or 嗡 (pinyin: wēng).

=== Representation in various scripts ===
==== Northern Brahmic ====
Script	Unicode	Image
Bengali-Assamese	ওঁ	
Devanagari (ligature)	ॐ	
Devanagari (Note: The devanagari representation can vary. ओं is common. Spellings such as ओम्, ओउम्. or अउ३म् are sometimes used to emphasise Vedic Sanskrit pronunciation.)	ओं; ओम्	
Devanagari (Jain symbol)	ꣽ	
Gujarati	ૐ	
Gurmukhi (Ik Onkar)	ੴ	
Gurmukhi (variant)	ੴ	
Lepcha	ᰣᰨᰵ	
Limbu	ᤀᤥᤱ	
Meitei Mayek (Anji)	ꫲ	
Modi	𑘌𑘽	
Newar	𑑉	
Odia	ଓ‍ଁ	
Odia	ଓ‍ଁ	
ʼPhags-pa	ꡝꡡꡏ (Note: As used in the Stele of Sulaiman, dated to 1348.)	
Ranjana		
Sharada	𑇄	
Siddham	𑖌𑖼	
Soyombo	𑩐𑩖𑪖	
Takri	𑚈𑚫	
Tibetan (Uchen)	ༀ	
Tirhuta, Mithilakshar	𑓇	
Zanabazar	𑨀𑨆𑨵	

==== Southern Brahmic ====
Script	Unicode	Image
Balinese	ᬒᬁ	
Burmese	ဥုံ	
Chakma	𑄃𑄮𑄀	
Cham	ꨅꩌ	
Cham (Homkar)	ꨀꨯꨱꩌ	
Grantha	𑍐	
Javanese	ꦎꦴꦀ	
Kannada	ಓಂ	
Kawi	𑼐𑼀	
Khmer	ឱំ	
Khmer (Unalome)	៚ (Note: Not represented in Unicode, but approximated using the horizontal ៚ (koŭmutr).)	
Lao	ໂອໍ	
Malayalam	ഓം	
Sinhala	ඕං	
Sundanese	ᮇᮀ	
Tai Lanna	ᩒᩴ	
Tamil	ௐ	
Telugu	ఓం	
Thai	โอํ	
Thai (Unalome)	๛ (Note: Not represented in Unicode, but approximated using the horizontal ๛ (koomûut).)	

==== Non-Brahmic ====
Script	Unicode	Image
Arabic	اوم (Note: Used for example in Urdu and Sindhi, although speakers of these languages may also use Brahmic representation such as Devanagari.)	
Chinese	唵	
Hangul	옴	
Kanji	阿吽	
Katakana	オーム	
Manchu	ᢀᠣ	
Mongolian (Ali Gali)	ᢀᠣᠸᠠ	
Tangut	𗙫 (Note: As used in the Stele of Sulaiman, dated to 1348.)	
Thaana	އޮމ	
Warang Citi	𑣿	

== Hinduism ==
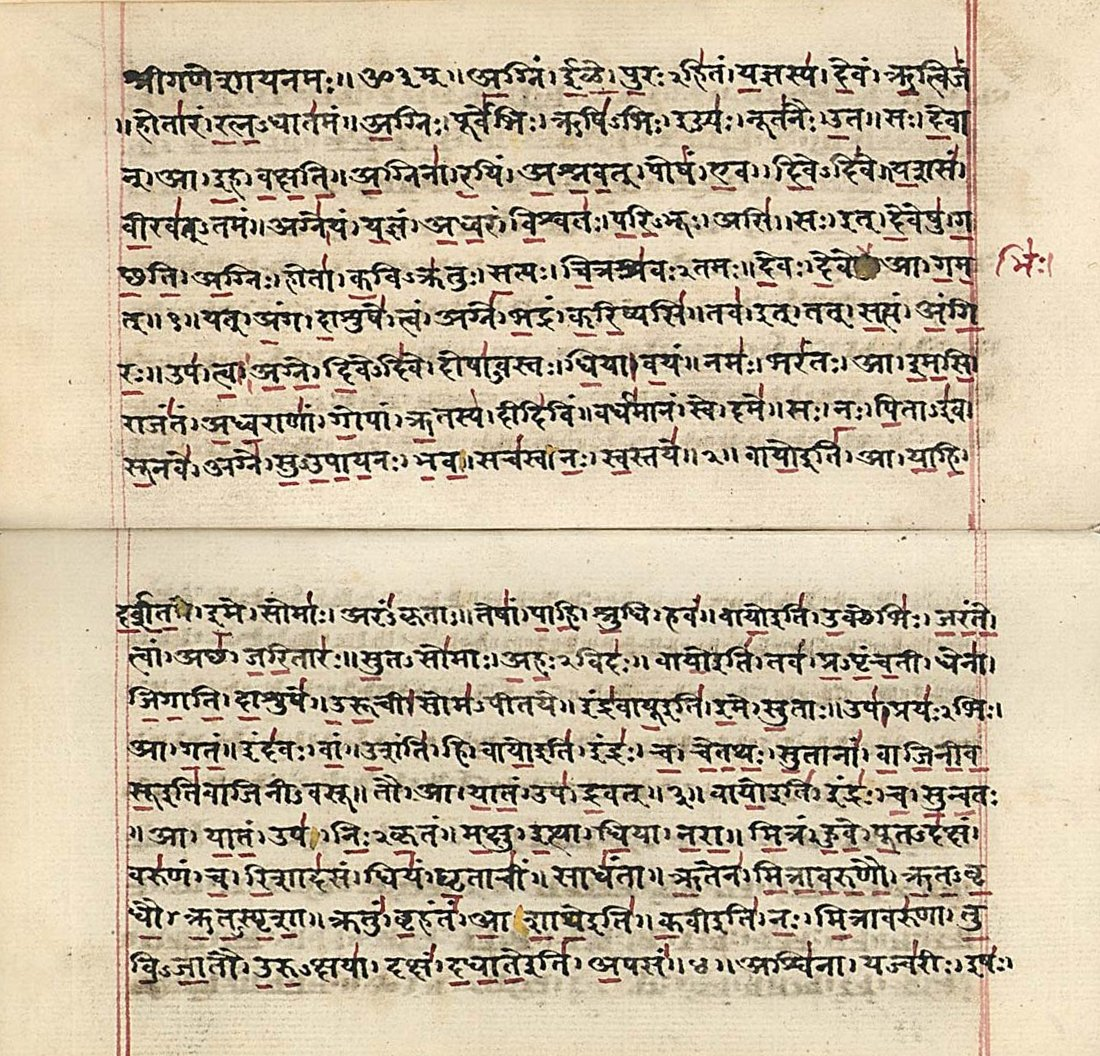
Om appears frequently in Hindu texts and scriptures, notably appearing in the first verse of the Rigveda (Note: in the early 19th-century manuscript above Om is written अउ३म् with "अउ" as ligature as in ॐ without chandrabindu)

In Hinduism, Om is one of the most important spiritual sounds. The syllable is often found at the beginning and the end of chapters in the Vedas, the Upanishads, and other Hindu texts, and is often chanted either independently or before a mantra, as a sacred spiritual incantation made before and during the recitation of spiritual texts, during puja and private prayers, in ceremonies of rites of passages (sanskara) such as weddings, and during meditative and spiritual activities such as yoga.

It is the most sacred syllable symbol and mantra of Brahman, which is the ultimate reality, consciousness or Atman (Self within).

It is called the Shabda Brahman (Brahman as sound) and believed to be the primordial sound (pranava) of the universe.

=== Vedas ===
Om came to be used as a standard utterance at the beginning of mantras, chants or citations taken from the Vedas. For example, the Gayatri mantra, which consists of a verse from the Rigveda Samhita (RV 3.62.10), is prefixed not just by Om but by Om followed by the formula bhūr bhuvaḥ svaḥ. Such recitations continue to be in use in Hinduism, with many major incantations and ceremonial functions beginning and ending with Om.

==== Brahmanas ====
===== Aitareya Brahmana =====
The Aitareya Brahmana (7.18.13) explains Om as "an acknowledgment, melodic confirmation, something that gives momentum and energy to a hymn".

Om is the agreement (pratigara) with a hymn. Likewise is tathā = 'so be it' [the agreement] with a [worldly] song (gāthā) [= the applause]. But Om is something divine, and tathā is something human.

— Aitareya Brahmana, 7.18.13

==== Upanishads ====
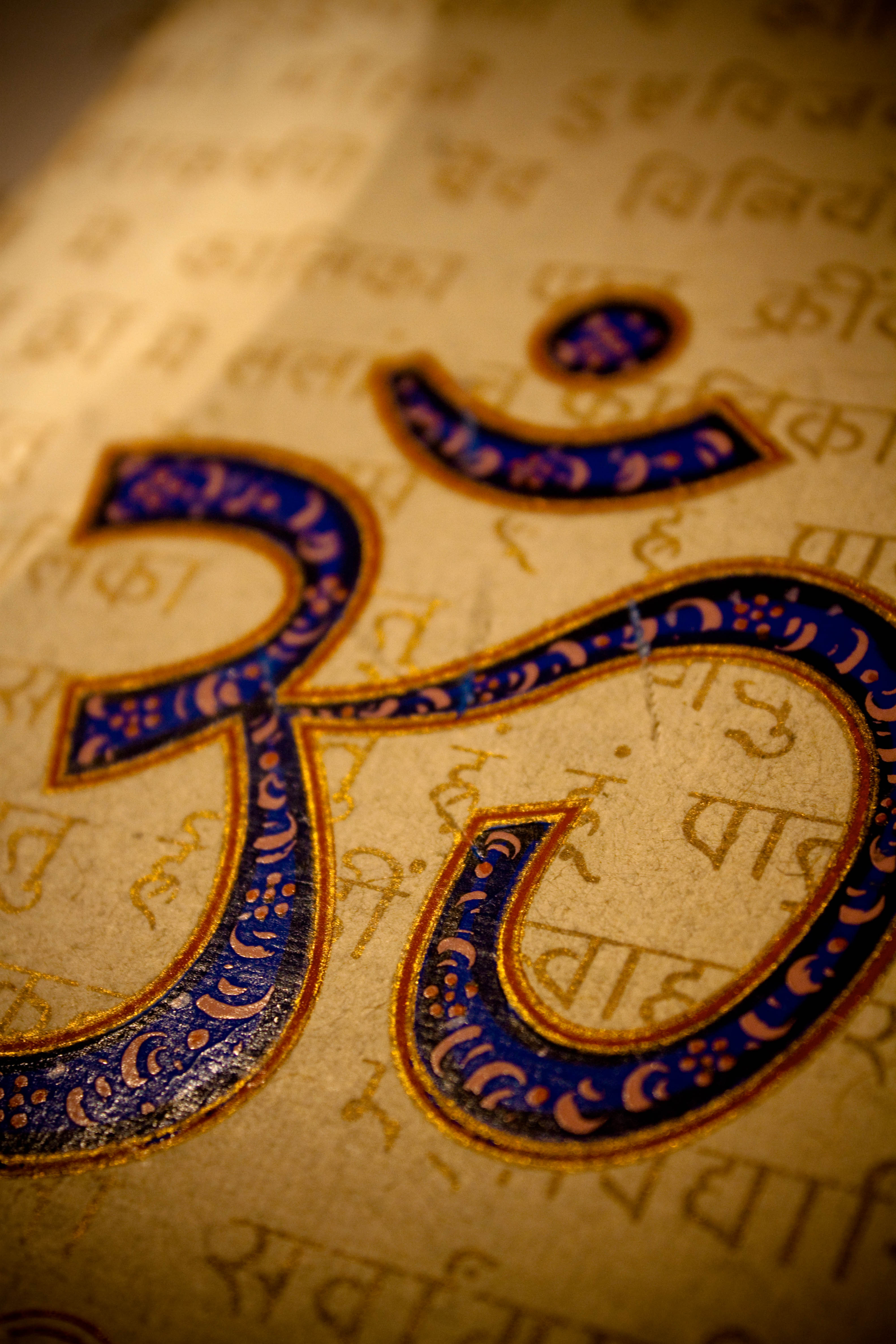
Ōṃ is given many meanings and layers of symbolism in the Upanishads, including "the sacred sound, the Yes!, the Vedas, the udgitha (song of the universe), the infinite, the all encompassing, the whole world, the truth, the Ultimate Reality, the finest essence, the cause of the universe, the essence of life, the Brahman, the ātman, the vehicle of deepest knowledge, and self-knowledge (ātma jñāna)".

===== Chandogya Upanishad =====
The Chandogya Upanishad is one of the oldest Upanishads of Hinduism. It opens with the recommendation that "let a man meditate on Om". It calls the syllable Om as udgitha (उद्गीथ; song, chant), and asserts that the significance of the syllable is thus: the essence of all beings is earth, the essence of earth is water, the essence of water are the plants, the essence of plants is man, the essence of man is speech, the essence of speech is the Rigveda, the essence of the Rigveda is the Samaveda, and the essence of Samaveda is the udgitha (song, Om).

Ṛc (ऋच्) is speech, states the text, and sāman (सामन्) is breath; they are pairs, and because they have love for each other, speech and breath find themselves together and mate to produce a song. The highest song is Om, asserts section 1.1 of Chandogya Upanishad. It is the symbol of awe, of reverence, of threefold knowledge because Adhvaryu invokes it, the Hotr recites it, and Udgatr sings it.

The second volume of the first chapter continues its discussion of syllable Om, explaining its use as a struggle between Devas (gods) and Asuras (demons). Max Muller states that this struggle between gods and demons is considered allegorical by ancient Indian scholars, as good and evil inclinations within man, respectively. The legend in section 1.2 of Chandogya Upanishad states that gods took the Udgitha (song of Om) unto themselves, thinking, "with this song we shall overcome the demons". The syllable Om is thus implied as that which inspires the good inclinations within each person.

Chandogya Upanishad's exposition of syllable Om in its opening chapter combines etymological speculations, symbolism, metric structure and philosophical themes. In the second chapter of the Chandogya Upanishad, the meaning and significance of Om evolves into a philosophical discourse, such as in section 2.10 where Om is linked to the Highest Self, and section 2.23 where the text asserts Om is the essence of three forms of knowledge, Om is Brahman and "Om is all this [observed world]".

===== Katha Upanishad =====
The Katha Upanishad is the legendary story of a little boy, Nachiketa, the son of sage Vājaśravasa, who meets Yama, the Vedic deity of death. Their conversation evolves to a discussion of the nature of man, knowledge, Atman (Self) and moksha (liberation). In section 1.2, Katha Upanishad characterises knowledge (vidyā) as the pursuit of the good, and ignorance (avidyā) as the pursuit of the pleasant. It teaches that the essence of the Veda is to make man liberated and free, look past what has happened and what has not happened, free from the past and the future, beyond good and evil, and one word for this essence is the word Om.

The word which all the Vedas proclaim,
That which is expressed in every Tapas (penance, austerity, meditation),
That for which they live the life of a Brahmacharin,
Understand that word in its essence: Om! that is the word.
Yes, this syllable is Brahman,
This syllable is the highest.
He who knows that syllable,
Whatever he desires, is his.

— Katha Upanishad 1.2.15-1.2.16

===== Maitri Upanishad =====
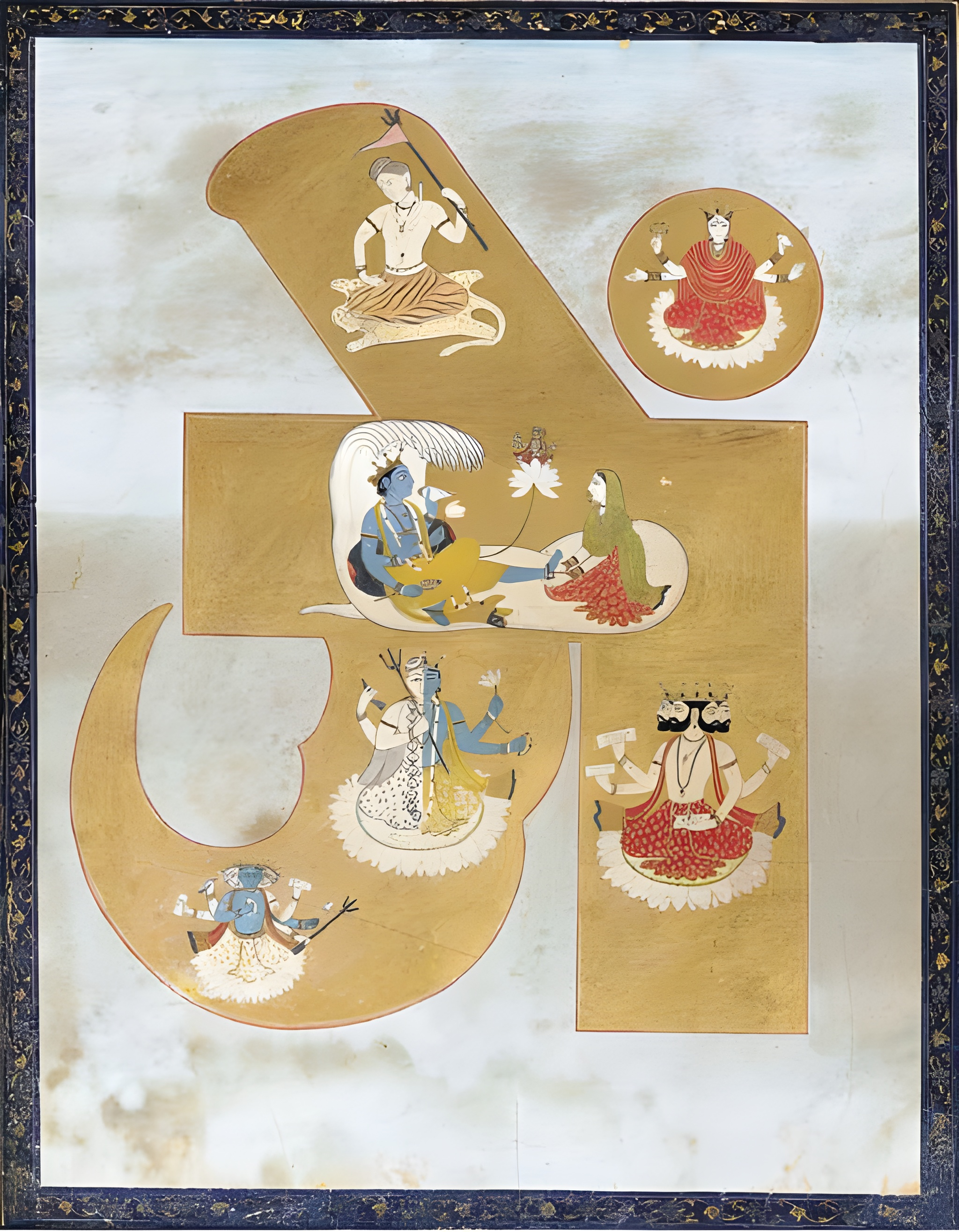
A Pahari painting of Om (ओं), c. 1780-1800, decorated with deities: Shiva and Shakti (could be Vaishnavi or Siddhidatri); Vishnu and Lakshmi seated upon Shesha; Harihara (Vishnu-Shiva fusion deity); Brahma; and Dattatreya as a representation of the Trimurti (top-to-bottom, left-to-right)

The Maitrayaniya Upanishad in sixth Prapathakas (lesson) discusses the meaning and significance of Om. The text asserts that Om represents Brahman-Atman. The three roots of the syllable, states the Maitri Upanishad, are A + U + M.

The sound is the body of Self, and it repeatedly manifests in three:

- as gender-endowed body – feminine, masculine, neuter;
- as light-endowed body – Agni, Vayu, and Aditya;
- as deity-endowed body – Brahma, Rudra, (Note: later called Shiva) and Vishnu;
- as mouth-endowed body – garhapatya, dakshinagni, and ahavaniya; (Note: this is a reference to the three major Vedic fire rituals)
- as knowledge-endowed body – Rig, Saman, and Yajur; (Note: this is a reference to the three major Vedas)
- as world-endowed body – bhūr, bhuvaḥ, and svaḥ; (Note: this is a reference to the three worlds of the Vedas)
- as time-endowed body – past, present, and future;
- as heat-endowed body – breath, fire, and Sun;
- as growth-endowed body – food, water, and Moon;
- as thought-endowed body – intellect, mind, and psyche.

Brahman exists in two forms – the material form, and the immaterial formless. The material form is changing, unreal. The immaterial formless is not changing, real. The immortal formless is truth, the truth is the Brahman, the Brahman is the light, the light is the Sun which is the syllable Om as the Self. (Note: Sanskrit original, quote: द्वे वाव ब्रह्मणो रूपे मूर्तं चामूर्तं च । अथ यन्मूर्तं तदसत्यम् यदमूर्तं तत्सत्यम् तद्ब्रह्म तज्ज्योतिः यज्ज्योतिः स आदित्यः स वा एष ओमित्येतदात्माभवत्)

The world is Om, its light is Sun, and the Sun is also the light of the syllable Om, asserts the Upanishad. Meditating on Om, is acknowledging and meditating on the Brahman-Atman (Self).

===== Mundaka Upanishad =====
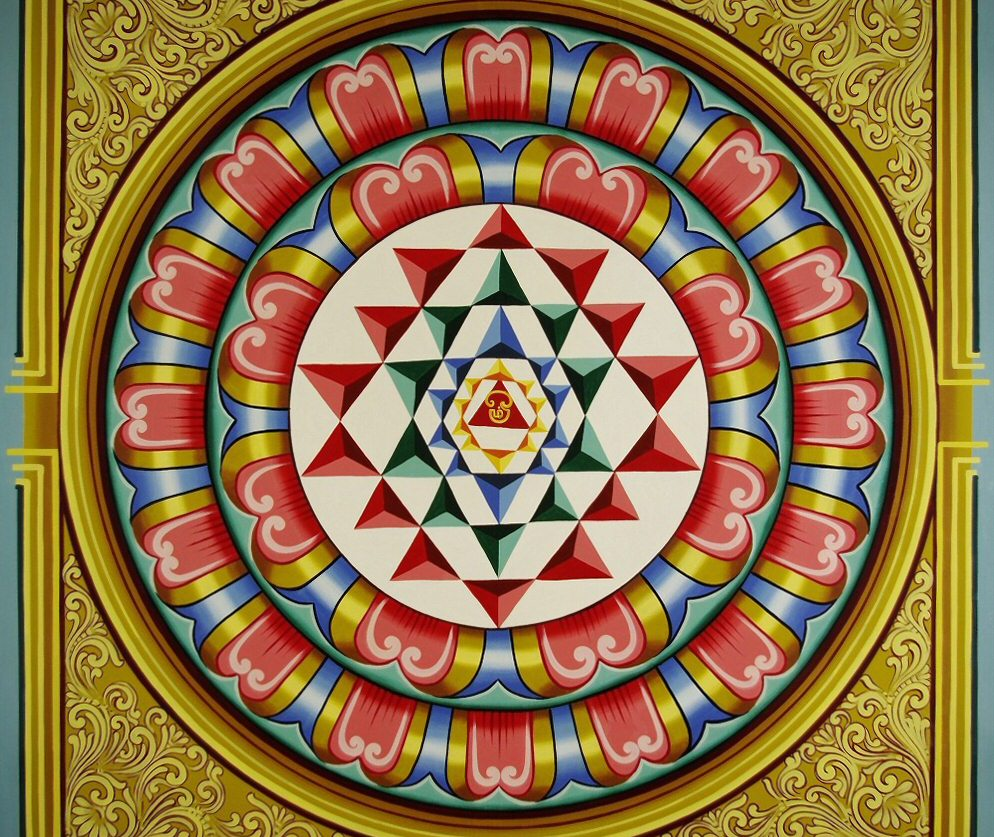
Shri Yantra with Om (ௐ) at its center, Sri Mariamman Temple, Singapore; yantras are frequently used as aids in Hindu meditation

The Mundaka Upanishad in the second Mundakam (part), suggests the means to knowing the Atman and the Brahman are meditation, self-reflection, and introspection and that they can be aided by the symbol Om. It uses a bow and arrow analogy, where the bow symbolizes the focused mind, the arrow symbolizes the self (Atman), and the target represents the ultimate reality (Brahman).

That which is flaming, which is subtler than the subtle,
on which the worlds are set, and their inhabitants –
That is the indestructible Brahman. (Note: Hume translates this as "imperishable Aksara", Max Muller translates it as "indestructible Brahman"; see: Max Muller, The Upanishads, Part 2, Mundaka Upanishad, Oxford University Press, page 36 and Robert Hume, "Thirteen Principal Upanishads" , page 367)
It is life, it is speech, it is mind. That is the real. It is immortal.
It is a mark to be penetrated. Penetrate It, my friend.

Taking as a bow the great weapon of the Upanishad,
one should put upon it an arrow sharpened by meditation,
Stretching it with a thought directed to the essence of That,
Penetrate (Note: The Sanskrit word used is Vyadh, which means both "penetrate" and "know"; Robert Hume uses penetrate, but mentions the second meaning; see: Robert Hume, Mundaka Upanishad, Thirteen Principal Upanishads, Oxford University Press, page 372 with footnote 1) that Imperishable as the mark, my friend.

Om is the bow, the arrow is the Self, Brahman the mark,
By the undistracted man is It to be penetrated,
One should come to be in It,
as the arrow becomes one with the mark.

— Mundaka Upanishad 2.2.2 – 2.2.4

Adi Shankara, in his review of the Mundaka Upanishad, states Om as a symbolism for Atman (Self).

===== Mandukya Upanishad =====
Composition and dating: Of the Upanishads that discuss Om, the Chandogya and Brihadaranyaka are considered the oldest, dated by Patrick Olivelle to roughly the 7th–6th century BCE. The Mandukya Upanishad: whose "four fourths" analysis of Om (A + U + M + silence) is among the most systematic treatments of the syllable in the early Upanishadic corpus, is by contrast one of the latest of the early Upanishads, dated by Olivelle to not much earlier than the beginning of the Common Era.

The Mandukya Upanishad opens by declaring, "Om!, this syllable is this whole world". Thereafter, it presents various explanations and theories on what it means and signifies. This discussion is built on a structure of "four fourths" or "fourfold", derived from A + U + M + "silence" (or without an element).

- Om as all states of Time.
  In verse 1, the Upanishad states that time is threefold: the past, the present and the future, that these three are Om. The four fourth of time is that which transcends time, that too is Om expressed.
- Om as all states of Ātman.
  In verse 2, states the Upanishad, everything is Brahman, but Brahman is Atman (the Self), and that the Atman is fourfold. Johnston summarizes these four states of Self, respectively, as seeking the physical, seeking inner thought, seeking the causes and spiritual consciousness, and the fourth state is realizing oneness with the Self, the Eternal.
- Om as all states of Consciousness.
  In verses 3 to 6, the Mandukya Upanishad enumerates four states of consciousness: wakeful, dream, deep sleep, and the state of ekatma (being one with Self, the oneness of Self). These four are A + U + M + "without an element" respectively.
- Om as all of Knowledge.
  In verses 9 to 12, the Mandukya Upanishad enumerates fourfold etymological roots of the syllable Om. It states that the first element of Om is A, which is from Apti (obtaining, reaching) or from Adimatva (being first). The second element is U, which is from Utkarsa (exaltation) or from Ubhayatva (intermediateness). The third element is M, from Miti (erecting, constructing) or from Mi Minati, or apīti (annihilation). The fourth is without an element, without development, beyond the expanse of universe. In this way, states the Upanishad, the syllable Om is indeed the Atman (the self).

===== Shvetashvatara Upanishad =====
The Shvetashvatara Upanishad, in verses 1.14 to 1.16, suggests meditating with the help of syllable Om, where one's perishable body is like one fuel-stick and the syllable Om is the second fuel-stick, which with discipline and diligent rubbing of the sticks unleashes the concealed fire of thought and awareness within. Such knowledge, asserts the Upanishad, is the goal of Upanishads. The text asserts that Om is a tool of meditation empowering one to know the God within oneself, to realize one's Atman (Self).

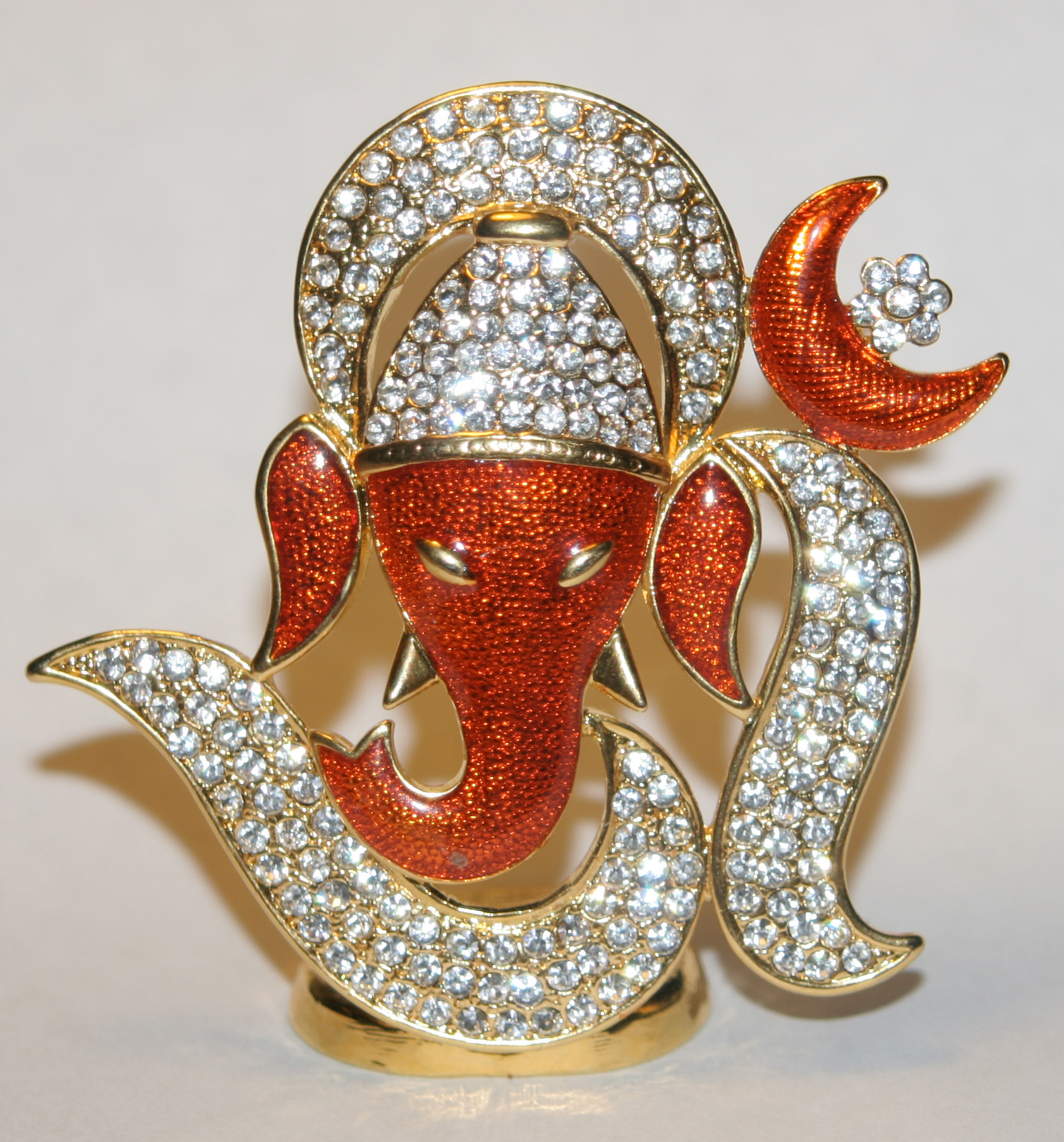
The Hindu deity Ganesha is sometimes referred to as "oṃkārasvarūpa" (Omkara is his form) and used as the symbol for Upanishadic concept of Brahman.

===== Ganapati Upanishad =====
The Ganapati Upanishad asserts that Ganesha is same as Brahma, Vishnu, Shiva, all deities, the universe, and Om.

(O Lord Ganapati!) You are (the Trimurti) Brahma, Vishnu, and Mahesa. You are Indra. You are fire [Agni] and air [Vāyu]. You are the sun [Sūrya] and the moon [Chandrama]. You are Brahman. You are (the three worlds) Bhuloka [earth], Antariksha-loka [space], and Swargaloka [heaven]. You are Om. (That is to say, You are all this).

— Gaṇapatya Atharvaśīrṣa 6

==== Jaiminiya Upanishad Brahmana ====
The Jaiminiya Upanishad Brahmana, a Samavedic text, outlines a story where those who chant Om can achieve the same rewards as deities. However, the gods are concerned about humans ascending to their realm. To address this concern, a compromise is reached between the gods and Death. Humans can attain immortality, but it involves relinquishing their physical bodies to Death. This immortality entails an extended celestial existence after a long earthly life, where the practitioner aspires to acquire a divine self (atman) in a non-physical form, allowing them to reside eternally in the heavenly realm.

=== Ramayana ===
In Valmiki's Ramayana, Rama is identified with Om, with Brahma saying to Rama:

"You are the sacrificial performance. You are the sacred syllable Vashat (on hearing which the Adhvaryu priest casts the oblation to a deity into the sacrificial fire). You are the mystic syllable OM. You are higher than the highest. People neither know your end nor your origin nor who you are in reality. You appear in all created beings in the cattle and in brahmanas. You exist in all quarters, in the sky, in mountains and in rivers."

— Ramayana, Yuddha Kanda, Sarga 117

=== Bhagavad Gita ===
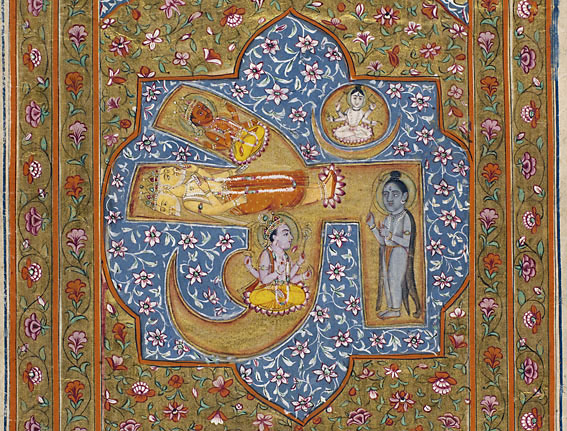
An illustration of Om from a Mahabharata manuscript, 1795, decorated with murtis of Surya, Brahma, and Vishnu to the left, Shakti (could be Maheshwari) on the chandrabindu point, and Shiva (holding a trishula) to the right

The Bhagavad Gita, in the Mahabharata, mentions the meaning and significance of Om in several verses. According to Jeaneane Fowler, verse 9.17 of the Bhagavad Gita synthesizes the competing dualistic and monist streams of thought in Hinduism, by using "Om which is the symbol for the indescribable, impersonal Brahman".

"Of this universe, I am the Father; I am also the Mother, the Sustainer, and the Grandsire. I am the purifier, the goal of knowledge, the sacred syllable Om. I am the Ṛig Veda, Sāma Veda, and the Yajur Veda."

— Krishna to Arjuna, Bhagavad Gita 9.17

The significance of the sacred syllable in the Hindu traditions, is similarly highlighted in other verses of the Gita, such as verse 17.24 where the importance of Om during prayers, charity and meditative practices is explained as follows:

"Therefore, uttering Om, the acts of yagna (fire ritual), dāna (charity) and tapas (austerity) as enjoined in the scriptures, are always begun by those who study the Brahman."

— Bhagavad Gita 17.24

=== Puranas ===
The medieval era texts of Hinduism, such as the Puranas adopt and expand the concept of Om in their own ways, and to their own theistic sects.

==== Vaishnava traditions ====
The Vaishnava Garuda Purana equates the recitation of Om with obeisance to Vishnu. According to the Vayu Purana, Om is the representation of the Hindu Trimurti, and represents the union of the three gods, viz. A for Brahma, U for Vishnu and M for Shiva. The Bhagavata Purana (9.14.46-48) identifies the Pranava as the root of all Vedic mantras, and describes the combined letters of a-u-m as an invocation of seminal birth, initiation, and the performance of sacrifice (yajña).

In Śrī Vaiṣṇava tradition, sub-traditions differ on who has eligibility to say Oṁ, but it is generally a "nonissue" as it is not necessary for salvation. The Teṉkalai division, represented by Piḷḷailokācārya in his Parantapaṭi, allow everyone to recite the praṇava, arguing the syllable arises spontaneously from all. The Vaṭakalai division, represented by Vedāntadeśika in his Rahasyatrayasāra, disallows women and śūdras from reciting the praṇava, citing older scriptural injunctions to support the stance.

==== Shaiva traditions ====
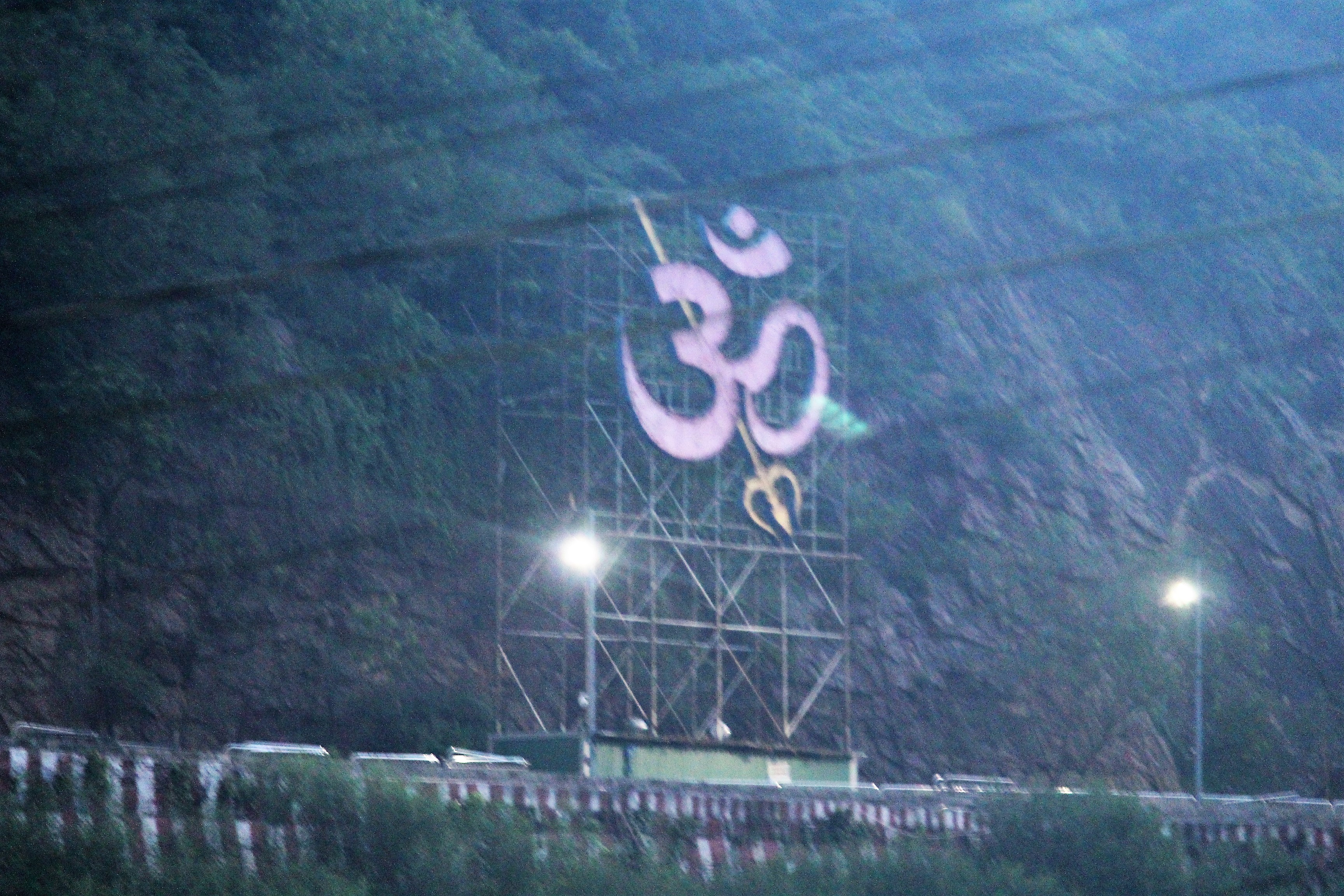
Om symbol with a trishula at Kanaka Durga Temple, Vijayawada

In Shaiva traditions, the Shiva Purana highlights the relation between deity Shiva and the Pranava or Om. Shiva is declared to be Om, and that Om is Shiva. After this, an epithet of Shiva is Omkareshwar, the Lord, Ishvara, of oṃkāra.

==== Shakta traditions ====
In the thealogy of Shakta traditions, Om connotes the female divine energy, Adi Parashakti, represented in the Tridevi: A for the creative energy (the Shakti of Brahma), Mahasaraswati, U for the preservative energy (the Shakti of Vishnu), Mahalakshmi, and M for the destructive energy (the Shakti of Shiva), Mahakali. The 12th book of the Devi-Bhagavata Purana describes the Goddess as the mother of the Vedas, the Adya Shakti (primal energy, primordial power), and the essence of the Gayatri mantra.

=== Other texts ===
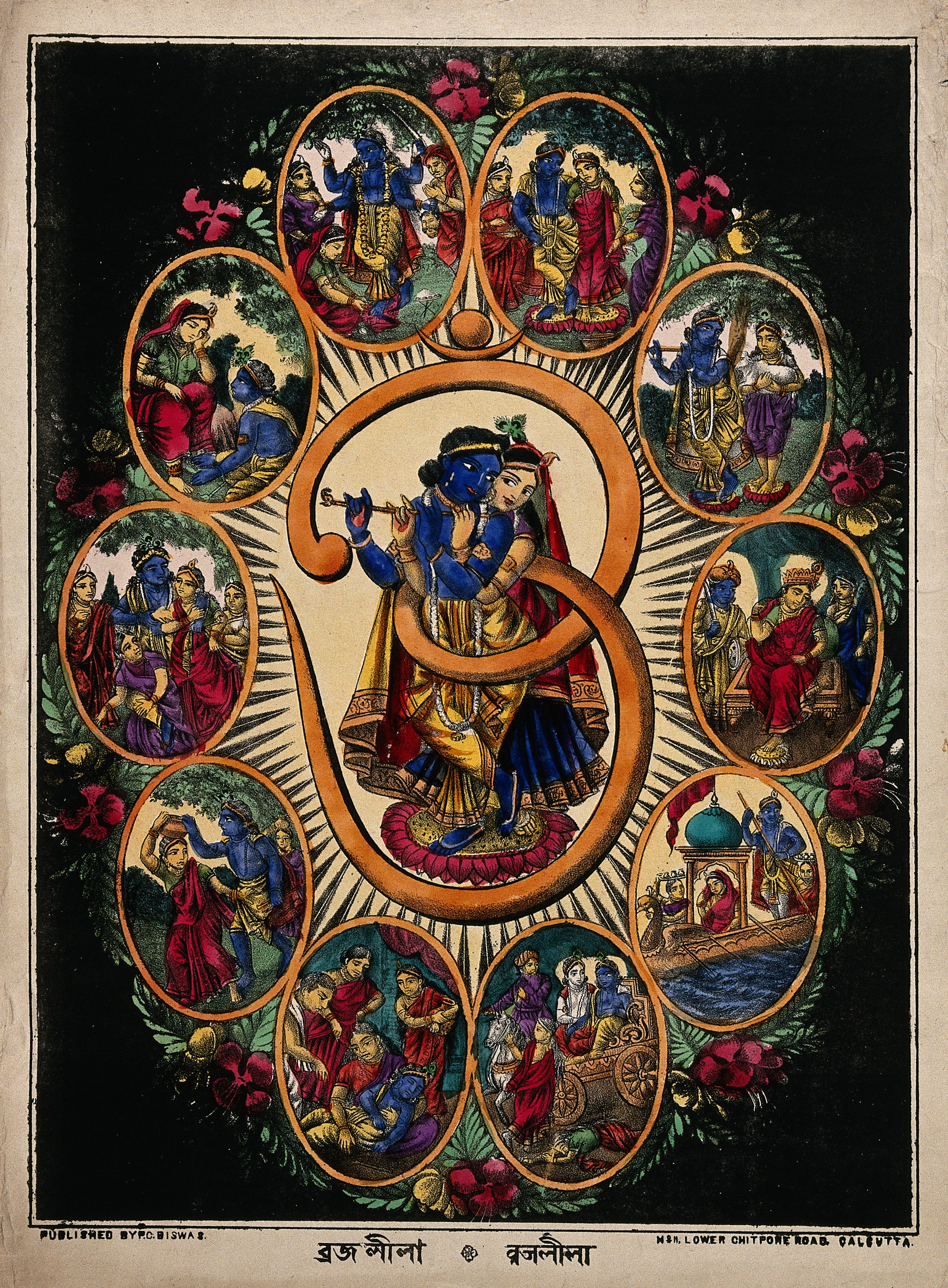
Radha and Krishna intertwined with an Om (ওঁ) and surrounded by scenes from their life

==== Yoga Sutra ====
The aphoristic verse 1.27 of Pantanjali's Yogasutra links Om to Yoga practice, as follows:

तस्य वाचकः प्रणवः ॥२७॥
His word is Om.

— Yogasutra 1.27

This verse highlights the importance of Om in the meditative practice of yoga, where it symbolizes the three worlds in the Self; the three times – past, present, and future eternity; the three divine powers – creation, preservation, and transformation in one Being; and three essences in one Spirit – immortality, omniscience, and joy. It is a symbol for the perfected Spiritual Man.

==== Tantrasāra ====
According to the Tantrasāra of Kr̥ṣṇānanda Āgamavāgīśa, a śūdra may not be initiated with a mantra beginning with Oṁ aka praṇava.

== Jainism ==
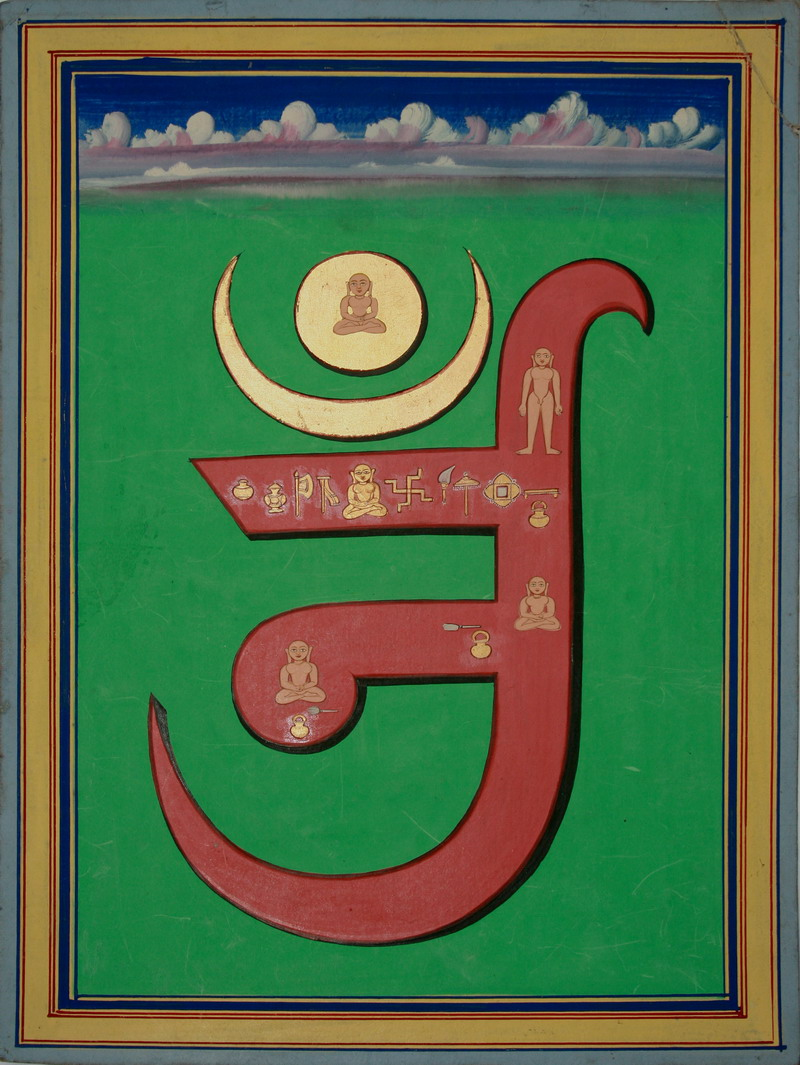
Painting illustrating the Jain Om symbol, from Jaipur, c. 1840

In Jainism, Om is considered a condensed form of reference to the Pañca-Parameṣṭhi by their initials A+A+A+U+M (o3m).

The Dravyasamgraha quotes a Prakrit line:

ओम एकाक्षर पञ्चपरमेष्ठिनामादिपम् तत्कथमिति चेत अरिहंता असरीरा आयरिया तह उवज्झाया मुणियां

Oma ekākṣara pañca-parameṣṭhi-nāmā-dipam tatkathamiti cheta "arihatā asarīrā āyariyā taha uvajjhāyā muṇiyā".

AAAUM [or just "Om"] is the one syllable short form of the initials of the five supreme beings [pañca-parameṣṭhi]: "Arihant, Ashariri, Acharya, Upajjhaya, Muni".

By extension, the Om symbol is also used in Jainism to represent the first five lines of the Namokar mantra, the most important part of the daily prayer in the Jain religion, which honours the Pañca-Parameṣṭhi. These five lines are (in English): "(1.) veneration to the Arihants, (2.) veneration to the perfect ones, (3.) veneration to the masters, (4.) veneration to the teachers, (5.) veneration to all the monks in the world".

== Buddhism ==
Om is often used as part of mantras and dharanis in Mahayana and Vajrayana traditions of Buddhism, such as East Asian Buddhism and Tibetan Buddhism. In East Asian Buddhist traditions like Chinese Buddhism, Om is often transliterated as the Chinese character 唵 (pinyin ǎn) or 嗡 (pinyin wēng).

=== Tibetan Buddhism and Vajrayana ===
The mantra Om mani padme hum written in Tibetan script on the petals of a sacred lotus around the syllable hrih at the center; Om is written on the top petal in white

In Tibetan Buddhism, Om is often placed at the beginning of mantras and dharanis. Probably the most well known mantra is "Om mani padme hum", the six syllable mantra of the Bodhisattva of compassion, Avalokiteśvara. This mantra is particularly associated with the four-armed Ṣaḍākṣarī form of Avalokiteśvara. Moreover, as a seed syllable (Bīja mantra), Om is considered sacred and holy in Esoteric Buddhism.

Some scholars interpret the first word of the mantra Oṃ maṇi padme hūṃ to be auṃ, with a meaning similar to Hinduism – the totality of sound, existence, and consciousness.

Oṃ has been described by the 14th Dalai Lama as "composed of three pure letters, A, U, and M. These symbolize the impure body, speech, and mind of everyday unenlightened life of a practitioner; they also symbolize the pure exalted body, speech and mind of an enlightened Buddha". Om is a part of many mantras in Tibetan Buddhism and is a symbolism for wholeness, perfection, and the infinite.

=== Japanese Buddhism ===
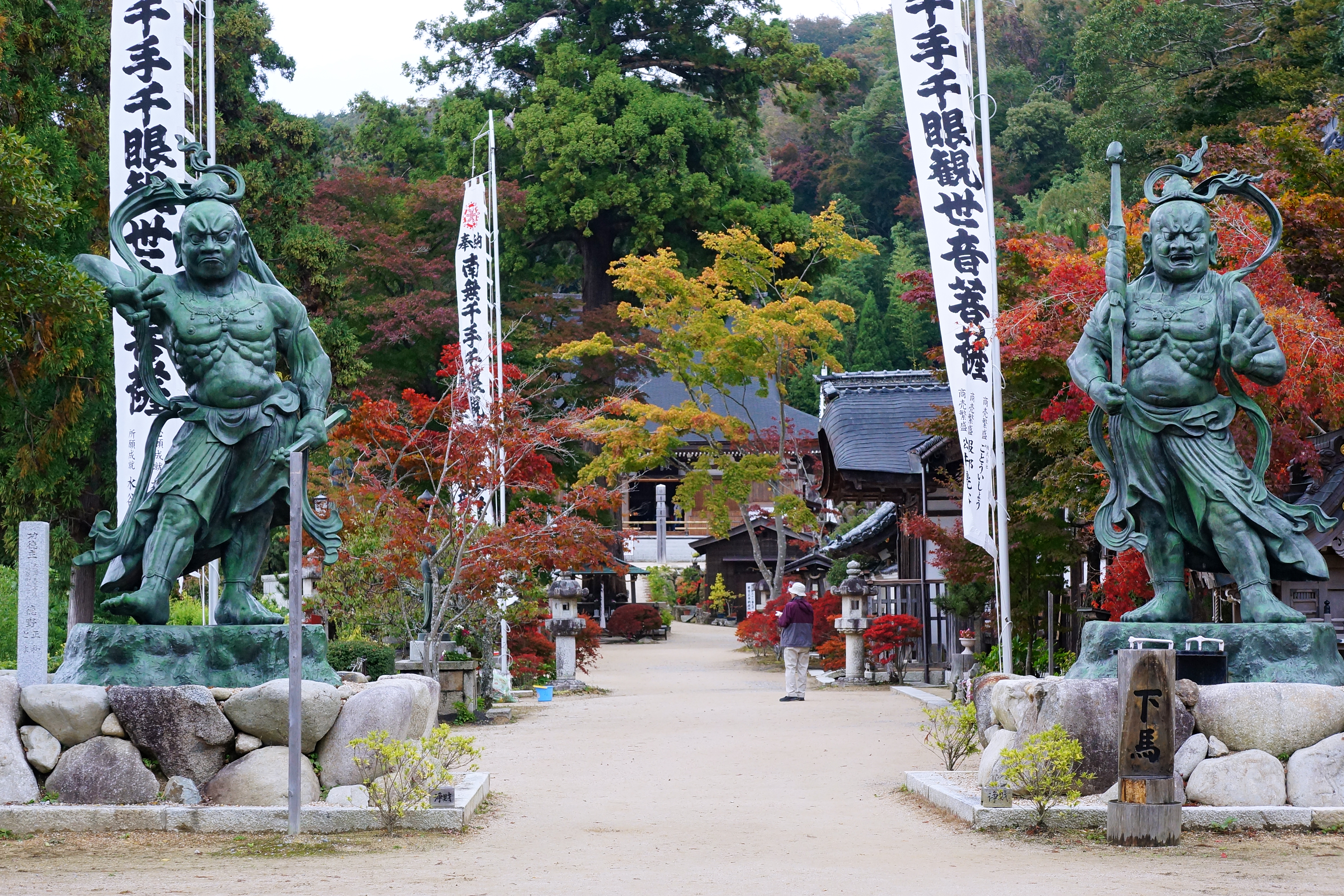
Nio statues in Kyoto prefecture of Japan, are interpreted as saying the start (open mouth) and the end (closed mouth) of syllable "AUM"

==== A-un ====
The term A-un (阿吽) is the transliteration in Japanese of the two syllables "a" and "hūṃ", written in Devanagari as अहूँ. In Japanese, it is often conflated with the syllable Om. The original Sanskrit term is composed of two letters, the first (अ) and the last (ह) letters of the Devanagari abugida, with diacritics (including anusvara) on the latter indicating the "-ūṃ" of "hūṃ". Together, they symbolically represent the beginning and the end of all things. In Japanese Mikkyō Buddhism, the letters represent the beginning and the end of the universe.

The term a-un is used figuratively in some Japanese expressions as "a-un breathing" (阿吽の呼吸, a-un no kokyū) or "a-un relationship" (阿吽の仲, a-un no naka), indicating an inherently harmonious relationship or nonverbal communication.

==== Niō guardian kings and komainu lion-dogs ====
The term is also used in Buddhist architecture and Shinto to describe the paired statues common in Japanese religious settings, most notably the Niō (仁王) and the komainu (狛犬). One (usually on the right) has an open mouth regarded by Buddhists as symbolically speaking the "A" syllable; the other (usually on the left) has a closed mouth, symbolically speaking the "Un" syllable. The two together are regarded as saying "A-un". The general name for statues with an open mouth is agyō (阿形; lit. "a" shape), that for those with a closed mouth ungyō (吽形; lit. "'un' shape").

Niō statues in Japan, and their equivalent in East Asia, appear in pairs in front of Buddhist temple gates and stupas, in the form of two fierce looking guardian kings (Vajrapani).

Komainu, also called lion-dogs, found in Japan, Korea and China, also occur in pairs before Buddhist temples and public spaces, and again, one has an open mouth (Agyō), the other closed (Ungyō).

Some a-un pairs
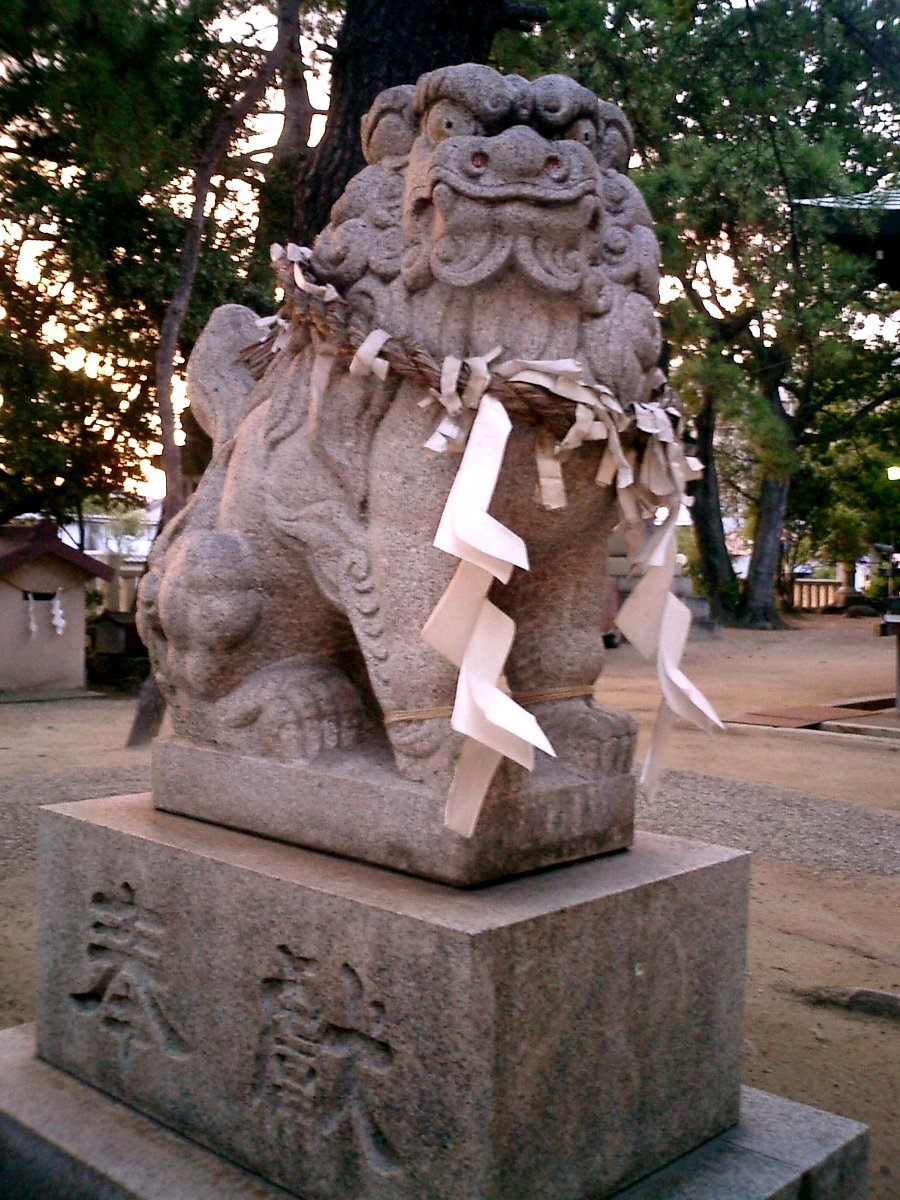
An ungyō komainu

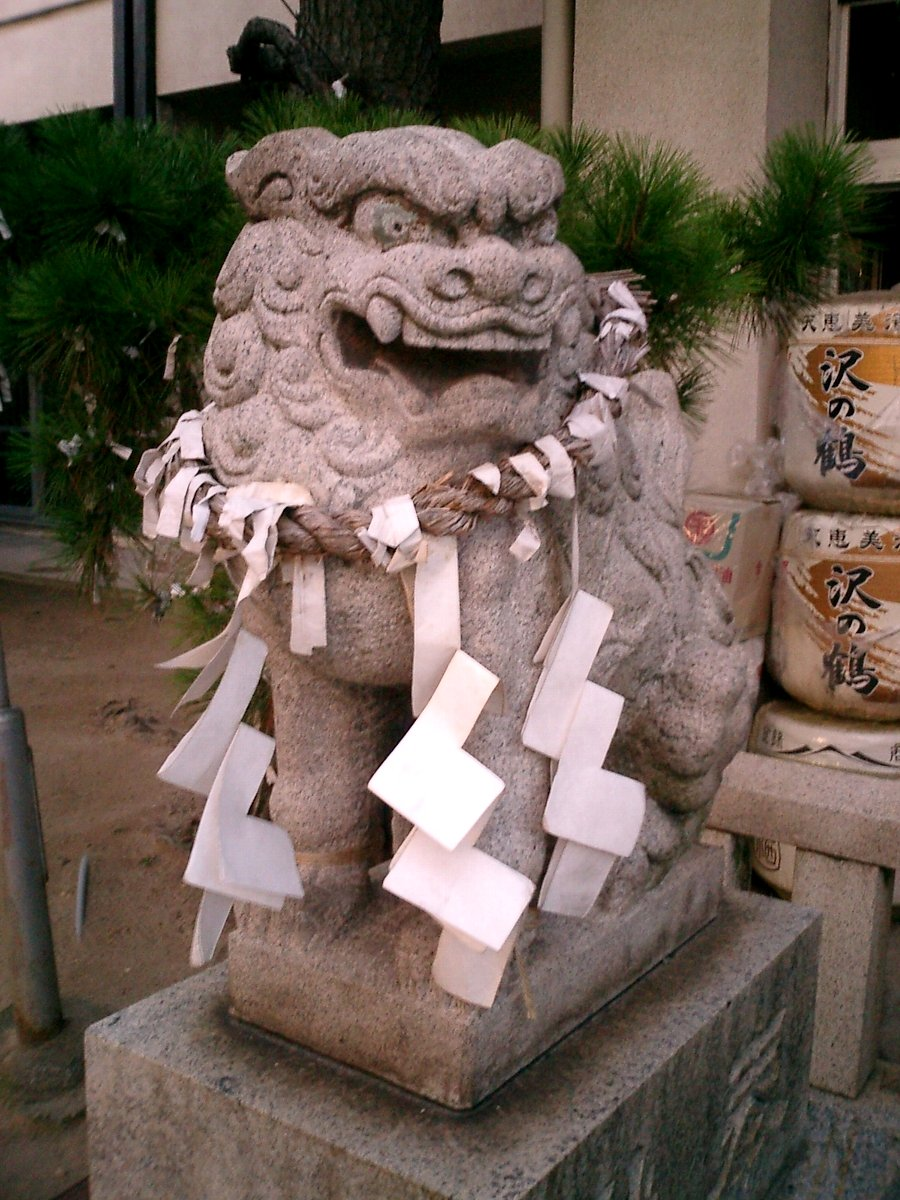
An agyō komainu

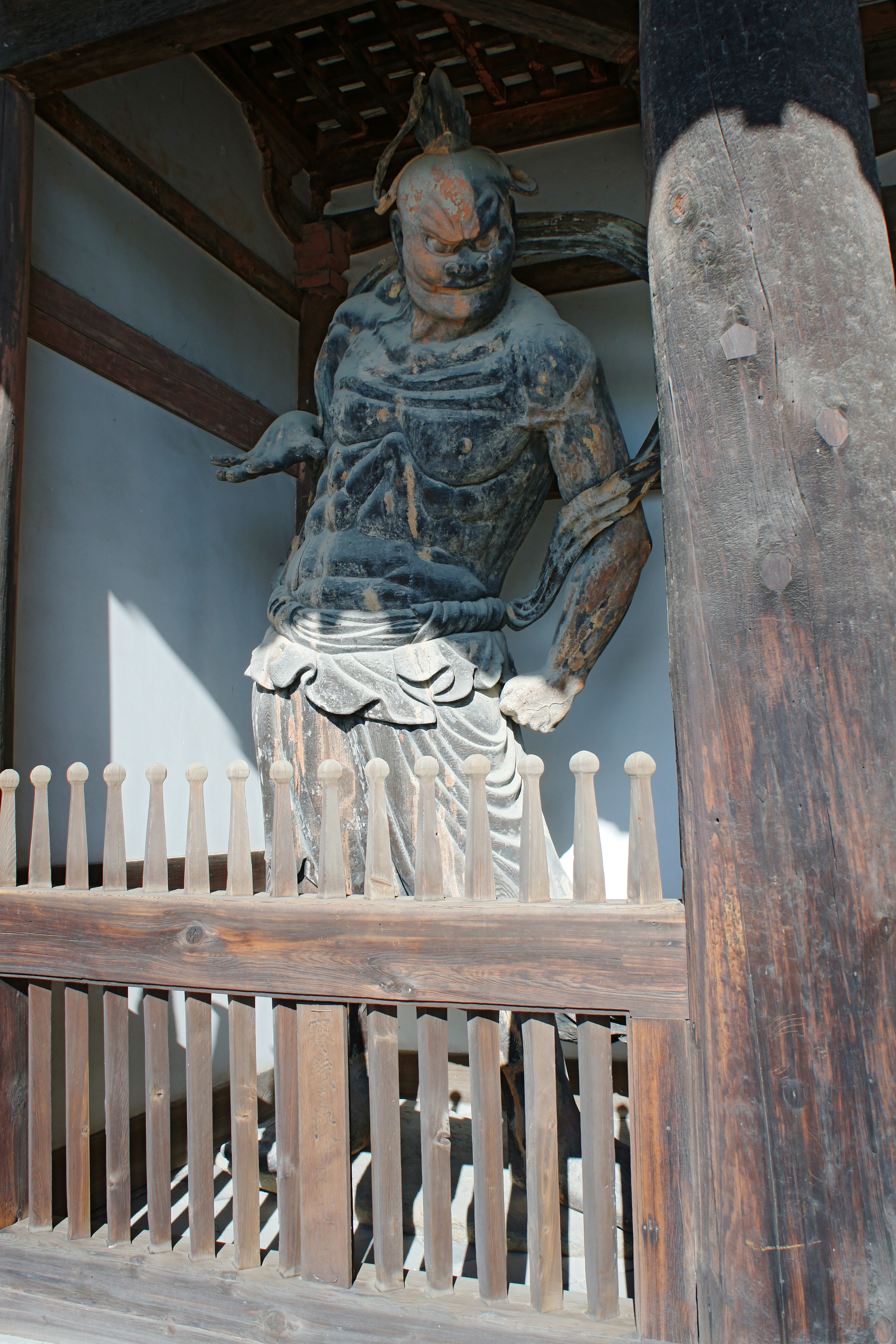
Ungyō Niō at the Central Gate of Hōryū-ji

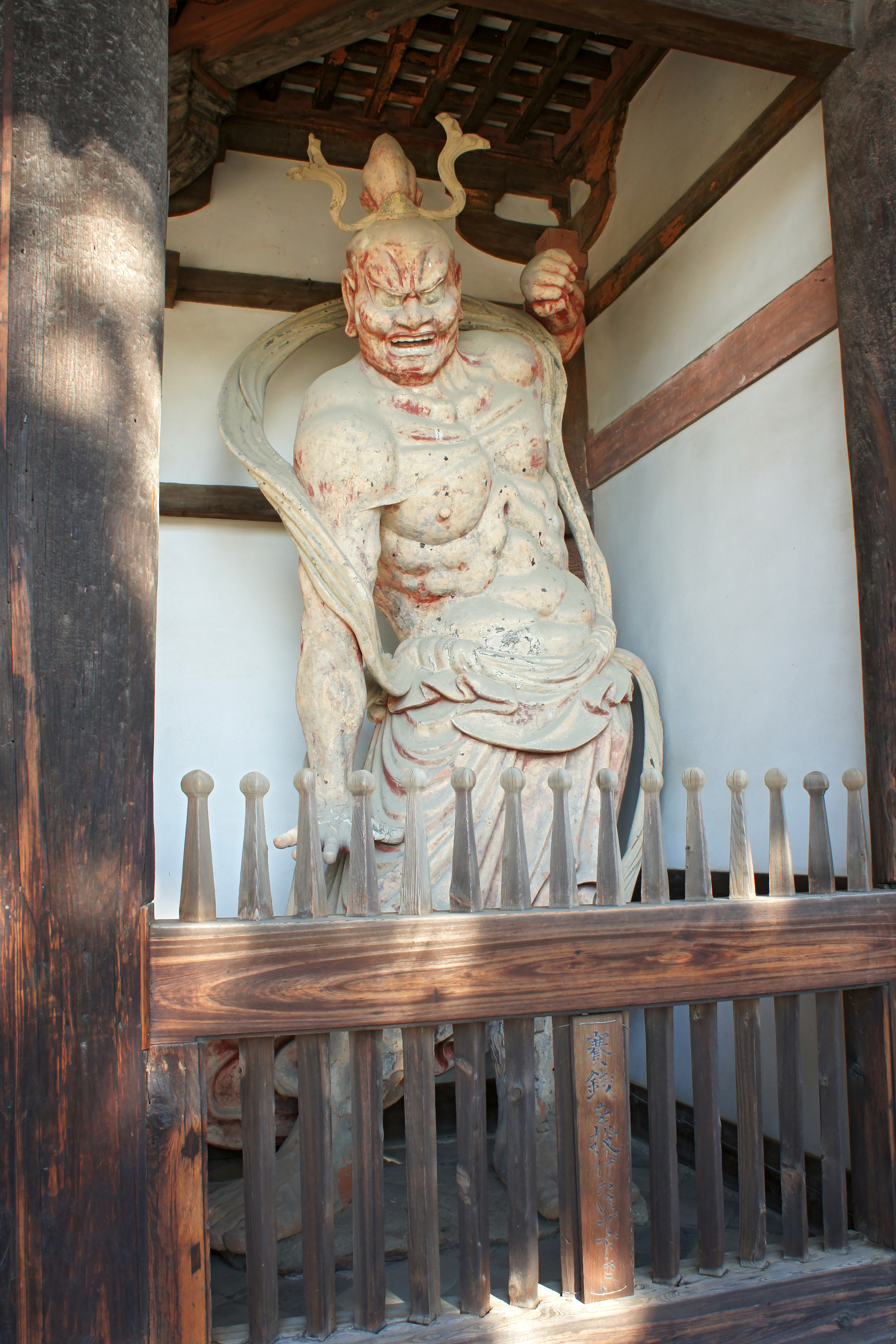
Agyō Niō at the Central Gate of Hōryū-ji

== Sikhism ==
Ik Onkar of Sikhism

Ik Onkar (Punjabi: ਇੱਕ ਓਅੰਕਾਰ; iconically represented as ੴ) are the first words of the Mul Mantar, which is the opening verse of the Guru Granth Sahib, the Sikh scripture. Combining the numeral one ("Ik") and "Onkar", Ik Onkar literally means "one Om "; (Note: Quote: "While Ek literally means One, Onkar is the equivalent of the Hindu "Om" (Aum), the one syllable sound representing the holy trinity of Brahma, Vishnu and Shiva - the God in His entirety.") these words are a statement that there is "one God", understood to refer to the "absolute monotheistic unity of God" and implying "singularity in spite of the seeming multiplicity of existence". (Note: Quote: "the 'a,' 'u,' and 'm' of aum have also been explained as signifying the three principles of creation, sustenance and annihilation. ... aumkār in relation to existence implies plurality, ... but its substitute Ik Onkar definitely implies singularity in spite of the seeming multiplicity of existence. ...")

According to Pashaura Singh, Onkar is used frequently as invocation in Sikh scripture; it is the foundational word (shabad), the seed of Sikh scripture, and the basis of the "whole creation of time and space".

Ik Onkar is a significant name of God in the Guru Granth Sahib and Gurbani, states Kohli, and occurs as "Aum" in the Upanishads and where it is understood as the abstract representation of three worlds (Trailokya) of creation. (Note: Quote: "Ik Aumkara is a significant name in Guru Granth Sahib and appears in the very beginning of Mul Mantra. It occurs as Aum in the Upanishads and in Gurbani, the Onam Akshara (the letter Aum) has been considered as the abstract of three worlds (p. 930). According to Brihadaranyaka Upanishad "Aum" connotes both the transcendent and immanent Brahman.") According to Wazir Singh, Onkar is a "variation of Om (Aum) of the ancient Indian scriptures (with a change in its orthography), implying the unifying seed-force that evolves as the universe". Guru Nanak wrote a poem entitled Onkar in which, states Doniger, he "attributed the origin and sense of speech to the Divinity, who is thus the Om-maker".

Onkar ('the Primal Sound') created Brahma, Onkar fashioned the consciousness,
From Onkar came mountains and ages, Onkar produced the Vedas,
By the grace of Onkar, people were saved through the divine word,
By the grace of Onkar, they were liberated through the teachings of the Guru.

— Ramakali Dakkhani, Adi Granth 929-930, Translated by Pashaura Singh

"Onkar" is the primordial sound/word. It is the soundless word (anahat naad or anahad naad). It is both the source as well as manifestation of the source. "Onkar" pervades the entire creation. The soundless sound is present everywhere and inside everything including us. In Sikhism, the Guru Granth Sahib is manifested form of this "Onkar". Hence, the Guru Granth Sahib is called "Shabad Guru". Shabad (word) is Guru and Guru itself is the Primordial Sound "Onkar" (God).

== New religious movements ==
=== Thelema ===
For both symbolic and numerological reasons, Aleister Crowley adapted aum into a Thelemic magical formula, AUMGN, adding a silent 'g' (as in the word 'gnosis') and a nasal 'n' to the m to form the compound letter 'MGN'; the 'g' makes explicit the silence previously only implied by the terminal 'm' while the 'n' indicates nasal vocalisation connoting the breath of life and together they connote knowledge and generation. Together these letters, MGN, have a numerological value of 93, a number with polysemic significance in Thelema. Om appears in this extended form throughout Crowley's magical and philosophical writings, notably appearing in the Gnostic Mass. Crowley discusses its symbolism briefly in section F of Liber Samekh and in detail in chapter 7 of Magick (Book 4).

=== Aum Shinrikyo ===
Aleph, better known by their former name Aum Shinrikyo, is a Japanese new religious movement and doomsday cult. Evolving out of a yoga school founded by Shoko Asahara and incorporating Christian, Buddhist and Hindu ideas, the cult was able to recruit a considerable number of educated elites. It carried out multiple criminal acts, including the Tokyo subway sarin attack, and has been designated as a terrorist organization by several countries.

== Modern scientific research ==
Beginning in the late 20th century, physiologists and neuroscientists have studied the effects of Om chanting using techniques such as electroencephalography and functional MRI. An early study found measurable changes in autonomic nervous system markers, such as heart rate and skin resistance, during Om meditation compared to rest.

A 2011 pilot fMRI study compared audible Om chanting to a control vocalisation and reported that Om chanting produced distinct patterns of neural deactivation in regions associated with emotional processing, noting that the vibratory sensation of the chant may stimulate the auricular branch of the vagus nerve. A later study examined the neuro-cognitive processing of the Om sound and its perceptual effects using functional neuroimaging.

== Modern reception ==
The Brahmic script Om-ligature has become widely recognized in Western counterculture since the 1960s, mostly in its standard Devanagari form (ॐ), but the Tibetan Om (ༀ) has also gained limited currency in popular culture.

== See also ==
- A in Buddhism
- Bījamantra
- Religious symbol

== Bibliography ==
- Saraswati, Chinmayananda (1987). Glory of Ganesha. Bombay: Central Chinmaya Mission Trust. ISBN 978-8175973589.
- Von Glasenapp, Helmuth (1999). Der Jainismus: Eine Indische Erlosungsreligion [Jainism: An Indian Religion of Salvation] (in German). Shridhar B. Shrotri (trans.). Delhi: Motilal Banarsidass. ISBN 81-208-1376-6.
