= Hansanarayan Bhattacharya =

- হংসনারায়ণ ভট্টাচার্য
- Born: 1928; Bidyapur, Kalna, Purba Bardhaman
- Died: 14 March 2002
- Education: University of Calcutta
- Occupation: Sanskrit researcher
- Notable work: Jatra Gane Motilal Ray; Hinduder Debdebi - Udvab O Kramabikash
- Spouse: Sandharani Bhattacharya
- Parent(s): Siddheshwar Bhattacharya (Father); Narayani Debi (Mother)

Hansanarayan Bhattacharya (1928 - 14 March 2002), a researcher of Sanskrit and Bengali literature, was born in Mirhat (now Baidyapur) village, West Bengal, India.

== Life and career ==
Bhattacharya passed the Master of Arts examination thrice – in Sanskrit, Bengali and history of India with distinction respectively. He completed his doctoral studies from Calcutta University; his research area was in Yatragan. He also studied Sanskrit grammar, kabyo and vedanta. He worked as a professor for nearly 34 years. He was the Dean of the Bengali and Literature department of Nabadwip Vidyasagar College.

== Notable works ==
One of his notable works is Hindu Debdevi- Udvob o Kromovikash (হিন্দুদের দেবদেবী - উদ্ভব ও ক্রমবিকাশ). He has written over 250 article on his research, poems, travelogues and other areas in many journals.

Bhattacharya's work has been documented by the Indian Institute of Science's Digital Library of India. His work has also been widely cited by Bhattacharya's peers and successors.
