= Nabadwip Vidyasagar College =

- নবদ্বীপ বিদ্যাসাগর কলেজ
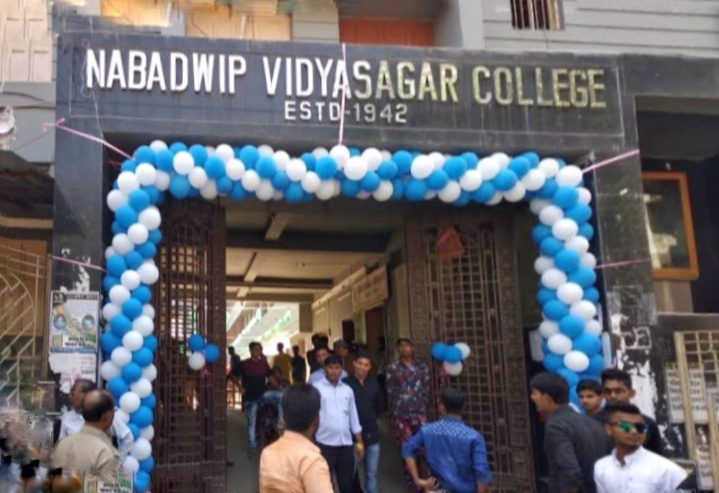
- Nabadwip Vidyasagar College
- Type: Public college
- Established: 1942; 84 years ago
- Affiliations: University of Kalyani
- Principal: Dr. Swapan Kumar Roy
- Location: Pacca Tole Road, Nabadwip, West Bengal, 741302, India; 23.4093319°N 88.3632625°E
- Campus: Urban
- Website: Nabadwip Vidyasagar College

- Location within West Bengal Location within India

Nabadwip Vidyasagar College (Bengali: নবদ্বীপ বিদ্যাসাগর কলেজ) is a college situated in Nabadwip in Nadia, West Bengal, India. It was established in 1942 as a branch of Vidyasagar College, Kolkata and was affiliated to the University of Calcutta, later in 1960 the University of Kalyani, was established and this college became affiliated with it. This college is one of the few colleges under University of Kalyani which offers undergraduate courses in arts, commerce and sciences.

== Foundation ==
The College was born on 5 March 1942 when the ongoing Second World War prompted the esteemed Calcutta Vidyasagar College to open two more campuses. One was at Suri, Birbhum and the other one was at Nabadwip, the erstwhile 'Oxford of the East'. Up to 1948 the college functioned as a branch of the mother institution. It was housed at the Nabadwip Hindu School. A local committee composed of some eminent citizens of Nabadwip ran the fledgeling institution, headed by Prof. Madhab Das Chakrabarty of Calcutta Vidyasagar College. Prof. J.K. Chowdhury took over as the Principal on 10.09.1948, when the college obtained an independent status, a full-fledged Governing Body and a permanent affiliation from Calcutta University.

The institution is affiliated to the University of Kalyani since 1999.

== Historical Context ==
Nabadwip, formerly known as Navadweep, is located on the western bank of the Bhagirathi River, opposite the confluence of the Jalangi and Bhagirathi rivers. Approximately 70 miles north of Calcutta, Nabadwip was a bustling city and a hub of Hindu learning in the 15th and 16th centuries. The city was teeming with intellectual activity, with numerous colleges (Toles) on every street, each hosting hundreds or even thousands of students.

The city was renowned for its literary tournaments and discussions, which took place daily at every ghat. Students were easily identifiable by the books they carried, which served as their badges of honor. Among the city's most distinguished scholars were Vasudeva Sarvabhuman and his disciple Raghunath Siromani Bhattacharya, who developed Nyaya Philosophy and established a Nyaya College in Nabadwip.

Nabadwip is also the birthplace of Krishnananda Agamabagisha, author of Brihat Tantrasara, and Sri Chaitanya Deva (1486-1533), a cultural mediator and spiritual saint who established a Tole at Mukunda Sanjay's house. The Vidya Samaj of Nabadwip honored Sri Chaitanya Deva with the title "Vidyasagar".

Krishnachandra Roy (1710-1782) made significant contributions to promoting Sanskrit learning in Nabadwip by establishing many Sanskrit schools and providing financial support for foreign students studying Sanskrit. His wife, Rani Bhabani, was also a patron of Sanskrit culture in Bengal. Reverend James Long once referred to Nabadwip as the "Oxford of the Orient".

Nabadwip Vidyasagar College is located in this historically rich area. During World War II, many intellectuals from Calcutta sought refuge in Nabadwip following Japan's bombardment of Calcutta. As a result, two branches of Calcutta Vidyasagar College were established, one in Suri, Birbhum, and the other in Nabadwip.

Nabadwip Vidyasagar College began its journey on March 5, 1942. Initially, it operated from Nabadwip Hindu School and functioned as a branch of Calcutta Vidyasagar College until 1948.

Under the guidance of Prof. Madhab Das Chakraborty from Calcutta Vidyasagar College, Nabadwip Vidyasagar College began its journey. The college gained independent status, a full-fledged governing body, and permanent affiliation from Calcutta University on 10 September 1948 under the leadership of Principal Prof. J.K. Chowdhury.

== Departments ==
=== Undergraduate programmes ===
The college offers undergraduate instruction in eighteen major subjects, along with several minor courses, across the Arts, Commerce, and Science streams.

==== Arts ====
- Bengali
- English
- Geography
- History
- Philosophy
- Physical education
- Political science
- Sanskrit
- Education

==== Commerce ====
- Accountancy

==== Science ====
- Botany
- Chemistry
- Computer science
- Economics
- Environmental science
- Mathematics
- Physics
- Zoology

=== Postgraduate programmes ===
The college offers postgraduate programmes in Sanskrit. In addition, four M.A. programmes are offered through the Distance and Online Learning (DODL) mode.

==== Distance and Online Learning (DODL) ====
- Bengali
- English
- History
- Education

== Accreditation ==
The college was first accredited by the NAAC with a Grade B on 17 April 2007.

It was reaccredited with a Grade B during the second cycle on 30 October 2017.

In its third cycle of assessment, the college was again awarded a Grade B by NAAC on 7 September 2023. The accreditation is valid until 6 September 2028.

== See also ==
- List of institutions of higher education in West Bengal
- Education in India
- Education in West Bengal
