= Manabi Bandyopadhyay =

Indian college principal

- Born: 1964 or 1965
- Occupations: Academic, writer, actress
- Employer: Krishnagar Women's College
- Notable work: A Gift of Goddess Lakshmi

Manabi Bandyopadhyay (born 1964 or 1965) is the first openly transgender Indian college principal.

== Career ==
Bandyopadhyay served as an associate professor of Bengali and philosophy at Vivekananda Satobarshiki Mahavidyalaya.

She became the Principal of Krishnagar Women's College on 7 June 2015 after a decade of struggling against patriarchy and convoluted notions regarding the third gender. Unlike men who would have applied for the same post, and women, who would have been appointed earlier, she had to garner support by projecting her career spanning over 16 years as a teacher, made possible by the intervention of the Chief Minister of West Bengal, Mamata Banerjee.

== Writing ==
She has written several books in the Bengali literature, and a biography, A Gift of Goddess Lakshmi, which was co-authored by Jhimli Mukherjee Pandey. She runs India's first transgender magazine, Abomanob which is now an annual magazine which runs for more than 26 years.

== Personal life ==
She has an adopted son named Debashish. She underwent gender-affirming surgery in 2003.

In 2013 she was a contestant on Bigg Boss Bangla. In 2019, Bandyopadhyay played a role in her debut film Purba Paschim Dakshin directed by Rajorshi Dey. She has also acted in Nagarkirtan directed by Koushik Ganguly.
