= Bhog (TV series) =

- Release poster
- Genre: Horror, Thriller
- Based on: Bhog by Avik Sarkar
- Written by: Avik Sarkar
- Screenplay by: Shantanu Mitra Neogi
- Directed by: Parambrata Chattopadhyay
- Starring: Anirban Bhattacharya; Rajatava Dutta; Parno Mitra
- Composer: Nabarun Bose
- Country of origin: India
- Original language: Bengali
- No. of seasons: 1
- No. of episodes: 6

Production
- Running time: 23-25 minutes
- Production company: Roadshow Films

Original release
- Release: 1 May 2025

Bhog is a 2025 Indian Bengali supernatural thriller web series, based on an eponymous novel by Avik Sarkar. Directed by Parambrata Chattopadhyay, it was released on the Bengali language OTT platform Hoichoi on 1 May 2025. The series stars Anirban Bhattacharya and Parno Mittra in lead roles, Rajatava Dutta and Sudipa Basu in supporting roles and Subhasish Mukhopadhyay in a special appearance.

The story Bhog was also adapted in another feature film by director Rajorshi Dey, titled as Purba Paschim Dakshin Uttar Asbei.

== Plot ==
Atin is a bachelor, who lives with his elderly aunt Pushpa di, after his mother's death. A private employee, he is an extrovert and loves clubbing after his office hours. But things take a turn in his life after he gets a mysterious brass idol from his friend Subesh's antique shop. He was intrigued by the features of the goddess' statue, who held a veena in her upper left hand, a kharga in upper right hand, a human skull in lower left hand and had lower right hand posed in aashirvad mudra. Upon inquiring Subesh about the goddess' name, he informed that it was unknown to him too as he received it while acquiring old items from an old house.

Atin starts getting haunted dreams every night after bringing the idol to his house. A green complexioned goddess comes to his dreams, asking him to feed her and satisfy her hunger. Worried by these events, he started offering her flowers and fruits as bhog. Bhavesh kaku analysed from its appearance that the idol represents a Tantric goddess. With Pushpa di, he warned him from worshipping her. It was an unknown goddess and Atin was unfamiliar with the rituals of her worship. Any mistake could cost him to face the wrath of the goddess. Without paying heed to their advice, he got indulged in her devotion, becoming eccentric and introverted, thinking only about the goddess.

One day, Bhavesh kaku brought a priest to recognize the idol. They were shocked to see Atin presenting a demented devotional dance to the goddess. The priest too failed to recognize it and suggested Atin to not worship her without knowing the proper rituals. But Atin, hellbent upon his decision, asked them to not interfere in his "Maa - chele" relationship with the goddess, since she comes in his dreams and speaks with him.

One day, Atin meets a mysterious homeless widow Damri, who stopped his car asking him for food. Then Atin accepts her request to offer her shelter. Despite objection from Pushpa di, Damri starts living with them and enthusiastically prepares bhog for Atin to offer to the goddess. On the next day after Damri's arrival, Atin finds that for the first time, the goddess has eaten his offerings. He felt there is some magic in Damri's cooking, since the goddess started eating "bhog" ever since she started cooking it. One day, Pushpa di suddenly disappeared. A police investigation was started but it was closed after a few days when Atin absent mindedly, gave police permission to shut down the case.

Over time, Atin starts hating social interactions and lost his will to live. Despite feeling like throwing up, he eats the foul smelling food cooked by Damri. Worried, Bhabesh kaku asked Subesh to take him to the place from where he procured the idol. They met the priest who handed over the idol to Subesh. He informed, the idol represents the ninth of the ten Mahavidyas, goddess Matangi. Being the kulguru of the local zamindar family in succession of lineage for hundreds of years, he revealed the reason behind the idol's creation. He handed it over costless, since Sahashraksh Chakraborty, the initial worshipper of the idol, had instructed that the idol must be handed over to someone if the family ever moves out of their ancestral house, or else danger will befall them. He stated that if a person commits any mistake while worshipping her, a petni belonging to the ten Mahavidyas will enter his life and kill him at the end of 1 amavasya.

While returning from office, Atin stopped at a dhaba, where he met Krishnananda Maitra. Atin gave a part his food on Maitra's request. Pleased, he gave Atin a sapphire pendant locket and advised him to never take it off. He assured that Maa Mahamaya will protect him. After wearing it, Atin regained sanity. He realised Pushpa di was missing. Next day, on amavasya, he realised, goddess has not eaten his previous day's offerings. Damri assured she will cook Mohabhog to offer that day. Going to the roof, Atin discovers tantric yantras drawn, where birds and cats lay dead. While returning home that day, he meets Bhavesh kaku, who informed him that Damri is a petni and the only way to defeat her is to fight her face to face or else she will sacrifice Atin on that day.

Entering the house, they find everything was in shambles. In one room, Damri was cooking a hand in a pot with fire emitting from her legs. Atin recognized it was Pushpa di's hand. He rushed to avenge Pushpa di's death. Attempting to stop Atin, Bhavesh got slapped unconscious by Damri. In a duel, Atin was forced to take off the locket, under influence of Damri's maya. When she was about to kill him, with his last bit of strength, he grabbed the locket lying slightly away from him. He touched it on Damri's forehead and she was killed. A week later, Bhavesh kaku regained his conscience. On his advice, Atin immersed the idol in the Hooghly River. In a post credit scene, it is shown that two friends are drinking at a river ghat. One of them suddenly notices a goddess asking him to give her food and satiate her hunger, indicating that people will go on getting trapped in goddess Matangi's maya unless she is properly worshipped by someone.

== Cast ==
- Anirban Bhattacharya as Atin Mukherjee
- Parno Mitra as Damri, a petni / Goddess Matangi
- Suraiya Parvin as Goddess Matangi
- Rajatava Dutta as Bhabesh Kaku
- Sudipa Basu as Pushparani Das (Pushpa di), Atin's maid
- Chhandak Chowdhury as Subesh Agarwal, antique shop owner
- Debabrata Dutta as Sahashraksh Chakraborty, a tantric toxicologist
- Ranjini Chattopadhyay as Atin's late mother
- Rituparna Basak as Anima, Atin's colleague

=== Cameo appearance ===
- Subhasish Mukherjee as Krishnananda Maitra

== Episodes ==
No.	Title	Directed by	Written by	Original release date
1	"Agomon"	Parambrata Chattopadhyay	Avik Sarkar	May 1, 2025
Atin comes across the idol of an unknown goddess at his friend Subesh's antique shop, which intrigues him. He brings it to his home and since its arrival, he starts getting haunting divine instructions in his dreams every night.
2	"Aradhana"	Parambrata Chattopadhyay	Avik Sarkar	May 1, 2025
Atin starts worshipping the goddess, initially out of his fear about the repercussions that he might face for not following the divine order, but later, out of his devotion, since, worshipping her became the sole motive of his life.
3	"Anuprobesh"	Parambrata Chattopadhyay	Avik Sarkar	May 1, 2025
Damri, a mysterious homeless widow, seeks shelter from Atin, which he provides despite objection from Pushpa di. Ever since she arrived and started preparing the bhog for Atin to offer, the goddess started eating the offerings everyday.
4	"Akraman"	Parambrata Chattopadhyay	Avik Sarkar	May 1, 2025
One night, Pushpa di suddenly disappeared. Indifferent to her disappearance, Atin falls for the maya of the sinister Damri, who starts caring for him and watched him completely delve into the darkness of his devotion.
5	"Anweshan"	Parambrata Chattopadhyay	Avik Sarkar	May 1, 2025
The night when Atin's uncle Bhavesh kaku discovered the secrets behind the idol and how to come out of its tantric maya, Atin meets a mysterious man, Krishnananda Das, who gave him a sapphire pendant locket and advised him to never take it off.
6	"Amanisha"	Parambrata Chattopadhyay	Avik Sarkar	May 1, 2025
As Atin regains sanity after wearing the locket, he and Bhavesh kaku face Damri in her actual form on the night of amavasya. With the enchanted blue sapphire, Atin defeats Damri in a final reckoning and immerses the idol in a river to get rid off her maya.

== Reception ==
Poorna Banerjee of The Times of India rated the series 3.5/5 stars and wrote "True to his signature style, Parambrata Chattopadhyay delivers another gripping horror web series. Though the series occasionally falters in pacing, Bhog remains a well-crafted horror drama with strong performances and atmospheric storytelling."

Santanu Das of Hindustan Times rated the film 3.5/5 stars and opined "Bhog is not so much about myths or demons as it is about faith. Beneath the surface of all the terror and thrill of Bhog lies the fate of a lonely middleman existing in his own little shell. As Atin will learn by the end, the sense of an offering, if any, must arrive as an act of love.

Shanku Sharma of East India Story reviewed the film and wrote "Bhog is a cautionary tale. It warns of the dangers of surrendering reason at the altar of mystery, of meddling with forces we don’t fully understand. It’s a deeply atmospheric, intelligent thriller that lingers long after the credits roll. The horror here is not of ghosts, but of psychological possession—of losing one’s grip on reality in the name of faith."

Shruti Mishra of Anandabazar Patrika rated the film 7/10 stars and highlighted "Parambrata presented his bhog with apt storytelling in a short span of time. Despite the good acting, terrific makeup and bad vfx has drowned the most important scenes. Besides, what's the use of horror as a genre if the audience don't get scared?"
