= Purba Paschim Dakshin =

2019 Indian Bengali film

- Directed by: Rajorshi Dey
- Written by: Avik Sarkar
- Based on: Ebong Inquisition
- Produced by: Suchandraa Vaaniya
- Starring: Paran Bandopadhyay; Kamaleshwar Mukherjee; Arpita Chatterjee; Gaurav Chakrabarty; Suchandraa Vaniya; Aryann Bhowmik
- Cinematography: Ranjan Palit
- Music by: Debojyoti Mishra
- Production company: Just Studio
- Release date: 22 November 2019
- Country: India
- Language: Bengali

Purba Paschim Dakshin is a Bengali spiritual thriller film directed by Rajorshi Dey and produced by Suchandra Vaaniya. This film is based on Ebong Inquisition, compilation of three Paranormal fiction of Avik Sarkar. The film was released on 22 November 2019, under the banner of Just Studio. It is the last film acted by Mrinal Mukherjee and debut film of Manabi Bandyopadhyay, India's first transgender college Principal.

== Plot ==
The plot gradually unfolds through an eventful rail journey. Stuti, a widow, suffers from a terminal disease which can be treated by a particular doctor. During her journey, a co passenger narrates her three stories that are interconnected. The stories somehow relate with the worship of Goddess Kali and the practise of Tantra in Bengal at the time of renowned Bengali scholar and pioneer of Tantra Krishnananda Agamavagisha.

== Cast ==
- Paran Bandopadhyay as Krishnananda Agamavagisha
- Kamaleshwar Mukherjee as Narrator
- Arpita Chatterjee as Stuti
- Rajesh Sharma as Panditji
- Aryann Bhowmik as Tenia
- Rudraprasad Sengupta as Bhabesh Kaku
- Gaurav Chakrabarty as Atin
- Bidipta Chakraborty
- Manabi Bandyopadhyay
- Suchandraa Vaaniya as Titli
- Mrinal Mukherjee as Dwijottam Mishra
- Damini Basu as Pushpa Di
- Kaushik Kar as Firingia
- Satrajit Sarkar as Khodabox
- Priyanath Mukhopadhyay as Ahmed Khan
- Eshika De as Damori
- Padmanabha Dasgupta

== See also ==
- Bhog
