= Brihat Tantrasara =

Ancient Hindu text

- Author: Krishnananda Agambagish; Editor: Rasik Mohon Chattapadhhayay
- Translator: Sri Chandra Kumar Tarkalankara
- Language: Bengali
- Subject: Bengali Shaktism, Kali puja
- Genre: Tantra
- Publisher: Nababharat Publishers
- Publication date: Falgun, 1285 Bangabda
- Publication place: India
- Media type: Printed texts
- Pages: 771

Brihat Tantrasara or Tantrasara is a famous work on the social worship system of the various goddesses of the Dasamahavidya mentioned in various texts of Tantra Sadhana. Krishnananda Agambagish, a well-versed Tantric devotee of Tantra, wrote the famous book Brihat Tantrasara based on 170 Tantra Sadhana texts. This famous work of him is appreciated all over the country. Krishnananda was liberal, he had no bigotry about religion. Therefore, Tantrasara texts have been inserted by taking the essence of Tantra texts of Shaiva, Ganapathi, Shakta, Vaishnavism and Solar community.

== Additional reading ==
- Agambagish, Krishnananda (1932). Chattapadhhayay, Rashik Mohun (ed.). Brihat Tantrasar. Kolkata: Nababharat Publishers.
