= Krishnananda Agamavagisha =

Bengali pandit and Tantrik, c. 1575 CE

Krishnananda Agambagish (a.k.a. Mahamahopadhyaya Krishnananda Bhattacharya) was a noted Kulin Bengali Brahmin of Nabadwip, Nadia district origin and a renowned Pandita (Scholar) and Sadhaka of Tantra tradition who lived around 1575 CE or 1575 Saka era (1653 CE). He is the author of the greatest tantric text ever written, the Brihat Tantrasara.

He (being the introducer of Navya Tantric-scripture, Tantrasara) is considered to be one among the four pillars of Shreehatta origin scholars in Nabadwip worked for Sanatana philosophy, alongside Raghunatha (introducer of Navya Nyaya), Raghunandana (introducer of Navya Smriti), and Vishvambhara: Chaitanya (introducer of Navya Vaishnava).

Agamavagish was born from Acharya Mahesh Bhattacharya in the year 1533 at Nabadwip. He had four sons - Kashinatha, Mathuranatha, Harinatha and Vishvanath. He had a brother Sahasraksha who was a staunch Vaishnava and a worshipper of Lord Krishna. Krishnananda was a descendant of Ramatoshana Vidyalankara, the author of Pranatoshani.He was also one of the four main disciples of Vasudeva Sarvabhauma.

Krishnananda is best known for popularizing the celebrations of Kali Puja, particularly in Bengal.

== Contributions ==
He is considered one of the greatest exponents of Tantric activism in Bengal. He authored Brihat Tantrasara, one of the most exhaustive worship and sadhana text for Tantra. Aagameshwari Kali puja, the oldest Kali Puja of Nabadwip was started by him. Agamavaisha is also considered as one of those rarest of the rarest sadhakas who had the divine vision of Adyashakti Mahamaya.

To his credit he popularized Kali Puja, in Bengal and turned it into a household practice, which was later carried on by his disciple Sadhak Ramprasad Sen. Before that, Kali Puja was considered a complicated form of worshipping not suitable for common people, which required high degree of expertise in Tantric sadhana. Krishnananda took it upon himself to reform the Tantra practice by removing the terrifying parts and establish it as a benevolent, tender and devotional practice for commoners.

== Death ==
It is believed that he underwent death in meditative trance at Mallarpur, Birbhum.

== Dakshina Kali ==
The development of worship of the form of Goddess Kali as Dakshinakali, is also often attributed to Krishnananda Agamavagish.

It is said that during this time, there was no idol of goddess Kali, known to anyone. Kali Puja used to take place using Tantric substances. One day Krishnananda, had a dream where goddess Kali said that whoever Krishnananda will first see in the morning, should be used as an inspiration to create her idol.

Krishnananda, went out in the early morning and saw a village woman, applying cow dung patties on a wall. She was supported by her right foot on a rock in front of her and was dark skinned with long untied hair touching her knee. Suddenly becoming conscious about presence of another male around her she stuck her tongue out in shame, as was the practice in the society of that era.

Krishnananda was deeply moved by this posture and took it as an inspiration to create an idol of Maa Kaali. It is said that since then, Maa Kali is being worshipped in Bengal in this form as all forgiving, tender and divine mother.

== Popular culture ==
Rajorshi Dey's 2019 Bengali thriller film, Purba Paschim Dakshin was based on the Tantra cult of Krishnananda Agamavagisha. The film is an adaptation of the book Ebong Inquisition, by Avik Sarkar. Paran Bandopadhyay played the role of Agamavagisha.

== See also ==
- Kali
- Ramprasad Sen
- Dakshina Kali
- Shakti
- Bhog
