= Rajballabh Sen =

18th-century zamindar and diwan of Dhaka (1707-1763)

Raja Rajballabh Sen
- Maharaja and Diwan of Dhaka
- Born: c. 1707; Beel Deonia, Bikrampur
- Died: c. July 1763 (aged 55–56)
- Father: Krishnajiban Sen (Majumdar)
- Religion: Hinduism

Raja Rajballabh Sen (Bengali: রাজবল্লভ সেন; c. 1707 – 1763) was a Bengali treasurer, revenue administrator, zamindar and Mughal official who served as the diwan of Dhaka and later as the faujdar of Monghyr in the 18th century.

== Background and political career ==
Rajballabh Sen was born circa 1707 in a village called Beel Deonia. A Baidya from Bikrampur (now in Munshiganj, Bangladesh), Sen commenced his career as a muharrir (clerk or scribe) around 1734 in the land revenue department.

Sen's father, Krishnajiban Sen, was himself a muharrir who later became a majumdar. While his family had typically held lower- to mid-ranking offices in the Mughal government, Sen's fluency in Persian, ambitious demeanour, and sheer competence meant he rose through the ranks rapidly, and became the head of the land revenue department. Soon after, around 1756, he was appointed diwan of Dhaka. He used his political position to establish connections with some of Bengal's most influential people at the time, and to acquire wealth and vast swathes of landed estate across Dhaka, Barisal, Faridpur, and Tipperah (now Tripura). The seat of his estate lay in Rajnagar, to the south of Dhaka, and became a centre of architectural excellence, characterized by large mansions and temples. Sen, by this point a maharaja, was also appointed to the post of deputy governor of Bihar around 1760. His town Rajnagar was eventually submerged by Kirtinasha, a channel of the Padma river in 1867.

== Social initiatives ==
Rajballabh Sen is noted for having attempted to promote and normalize the practice of widow remarriage in Bengal. In 1757, when his daughter became widowed at a young age, he decided to consult pandits from southern and eastern India, who granted that widow remarriage was consistent with Hindu philosophy. However, when Sen tried to convince Krishnachandra Roy, the orthodox Raja of Nadia at the time who was influential for Hindu religious practices, and his priests, that the prohibition on widow remarriage be overturned, Roy fervently opposed him. With his opposition, Sen failed to achieve the change he sought. Nevertheless, his vision did not go in vain, as Hindu widow remarriage would go on to be legalized about a century after his death.

Sen is also remembered for working towards the welfare of his community, the Baidyas. The particular section of the community that he hailed from, the Bangaja Baidyas, had long lost their right to wear the sacred thread, unlike the Rarhi Baidyas. Therefore, he invited Brahmins from Benaras, Kannauj, Nabadwip and other regions with expertise in Nyaya Shastra to reinstitute the right of the Bangaja Baidyas to wear the sacred thread. All of them adjudicated in his favour, with ceremonial costs running to five lakhs.

== Conflict with Siraj-ud-Daulah and death ==
Rajballabh Sen is perhaps most notorious for his association with Mir Jafar, Ghaseti Begum, and the British East India Company. He supported Ghaseti Begum in her power struggle to enthrone Shaukat Jang, the son of Ghaseti's second sister Maimuna Begum. Siraj grew suspicious of Sen, then diwan of Dhaka, and believed that Shaukat Jang was the illegitimate son of Maimuna and Sen. He also believed Sen had embezzled a large sum of money. Displeased, Siraj sent his troops to Rajnagar in hopes of arresting members of his family and seizing his questionably accumulated property. However, by then, Krishnadas, Sen's son, had already escaped to Calcutta with his wealth, and gained the asylum of its governor, Roger Drake.

After the British ultimately emerged victorious in the Battle of Plassey in 1757, Sen grew closer to them and started conspiring with them. Sen's partnership with the British, however, was short-lived. In July 1763, Mir Qasim, who had succeeded Mir Jafar as the Nawab of Bengal, suspected him of treachery; at his orders, Sen and his eldest son (Note: Whether Sen's eldest son was executed alongside him is disputed.) were executed by drowning.

== Bibliography ==
- Maharaja Rajballabh by R. C. Majumdar, University of Calcutta, 1947.
