= Buno Ramnath =

18th century Indian logician and scholar

- Rāmanātha Tarkasid'dhānta (রামনাথ তর্কসিদ্ধান্ত)
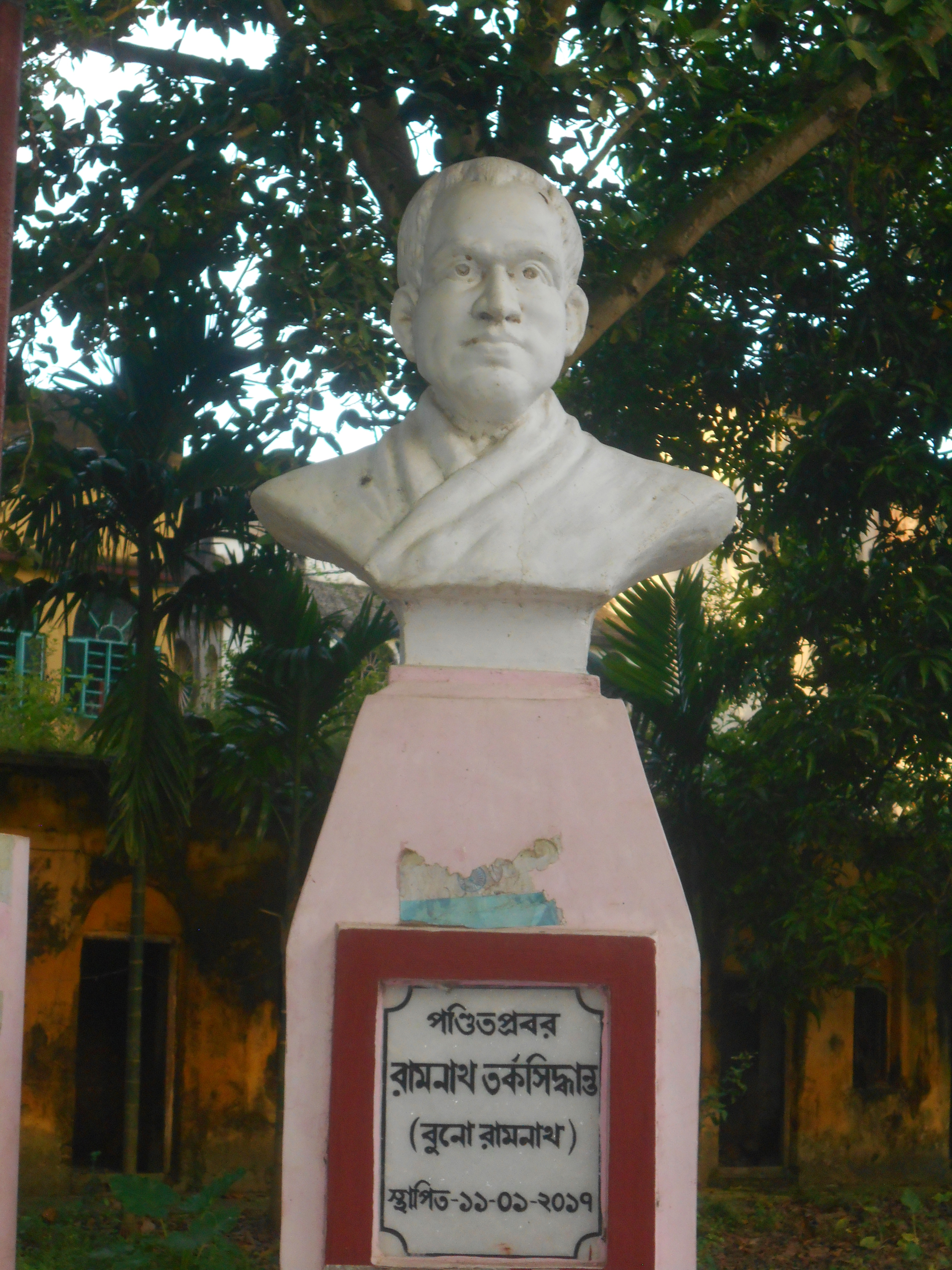
- Bust of Ramnath Tarkasiddhanta
- Born: middle of eighteen century Bengal, British India
- Occupations: Tol teacher; Scholar; Logician
- Writing career
- Language: Bengali, Sanskrit

Ramnath Tarkasiddhanta, popularly known as Buno Ramnath, was a prominent logician, scholar and ideal teacher of Nabadwip in the eighteenth century. He was called Buno as he had set up his Chatuspathi in a forest area.

== Early life ==
Ramnath was born in the middle of the eighteenth century but historians has a doubt about his birthplace. According to Dr. Alok Kumar Chakraborty, he was the son of Abhayaram Tarkabhushan of the Bhattacharya family of Dhatrigram. Beside that, Joggeshwar Chowdhury said that Samudragarh is the birthplace of Ramnath.

== Career ==
After acquiring an outstanding reputation for his erudition, Ramnath set up Chatuspathi in Nabadwip and taught there. He was always engrossed in the pursuit of knowledge. As the fame of his erudition spread around, countless students came to his tol or chatuspathi to learn from him. Many people including Prasanna Chandra Tarkaratna used to practice Shatra in his Chatuspathi. Among his students, Krishnananda Vidya-Bachaspati Saraswati Maharaj of Dharmadaha Bahirgachhi became famous for composing a book called Antarbyākaraṇa Nāṭya-Pariśiṣṭa from the divan of Maharaja Srishchandra. Even though Ramnath was very poor, he never took any royal grace. When Nadia Raj came to Nabadwip and saw his poverty, he asked him if he had any worldly issues. In his reply he said-

No, I have no problem. I have a few bighas of land, which produces enough grain, and in front of me you can see this Tamarind tree; My wife cooks a beautiful soup with this leaf, I eat it with great satisfaction.

== Legend ==
In the eighteen century, a debate meeting was organised at the divan of Maharaja Nabakrishna in Kolkata (then Calcutta) for the purpose of a logical victory. Legalist Shibnath Vidyabachaspati of Nabadwip and Jagannath Tarka Panchanan of Tribeni were present at the meeting. When no one could argue with the stranger logician in the debate held there, Buno Ramnath appeared there and defeated him through argument and maintained the standard of justice of Nabadwip. Being happy when King Nabakrishna wanted to give him a lot of wealth, Ramnath did not touch them and said the crow-shit. Ramnath believed that money is the root of evil.

The identity of Ramnath's poverty can be understood from the common hearsay about his wife. Once the queen of Nadia Raj came to the Nabadwip ghat. When Ramnath's wife was returning from the ghat, the water of her sari sprinkled on the queen. But Ramnath's wife left the place without giving any apology. Being angry Maharani said,

Bhāri tō du'gāchā lāla suto. Tāra ābāra ēto dēmāka. O'i suto chiṛatē katakşana? (Means, you only have a red tread on your hand as a sign of married, still how did you get that courage to behave like that. This thread can be tron any time.)

In reply she said-

Ēi lāla sutō yē dina chirē yābē, sē dina Nabadwip andhakāra hayē yābē. (The day this red thread will be torn, Nabadwip will be dark from its standard of logician. (Note: Kantichandra Rari, the author of Nabadwip Mahima, mentions that the legend took place between the wife of Maharaja Ramakrishna and the wife of the then Nabadwip Pandit Krishnaram Bhattacharya.))

== Tol of Buno Ramnath ==
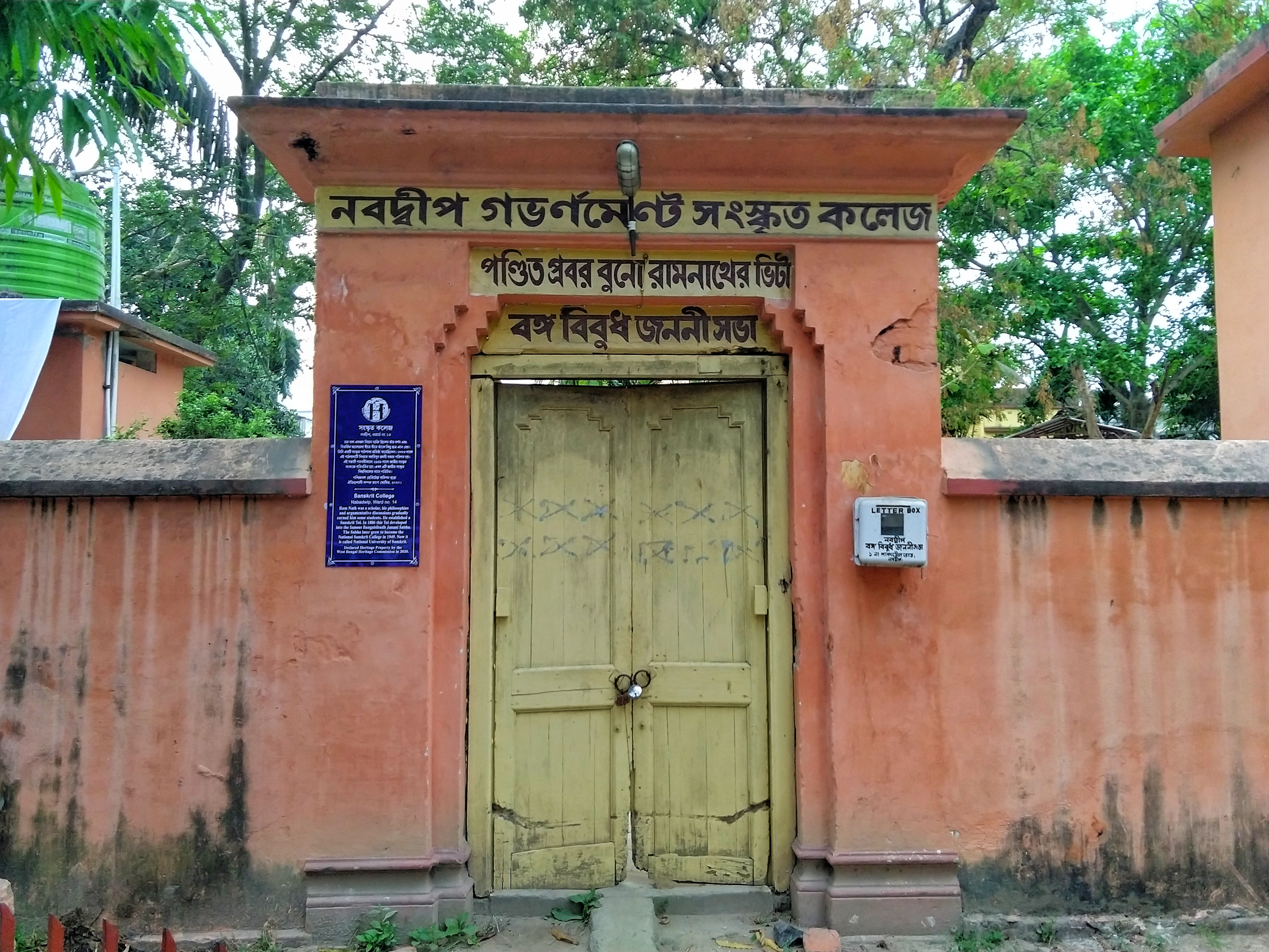
Buno Ramnath's Tol house, where Banga Bibudha Janani Sabha was set up. And also the Nabadwip Government Sanskrit College

In 1886, the main Sanskrit learning center of India as well as the undivided Bengal was established at the Tol house of Buno Ramnath. The Banga Bibudha Janani Sabha was set up under the chairmanship of Raja Indrachandra Singh of Paikpara and under the editorship of retired Deputy Magistrate Mahendranath Bhattacharya to revive the Sanskrit practice all over the India. The secretary of Banga Bibudha Janani Sabha, Arun Kumar Chakraborty said-

This is our main objective to revive the practice of Sanskrit in Nabadwip. An Oriental Study Center will be set up at the Tol house of Buno Ramnath. Apart from Sanskrit practice, sociology, regional history practice, Ayurveda practice, Shastra practice can also be included in Oriental studies. We have appealed to the state and central government for this. This education parliament, which has come to a complete stop for the time being, has been reactivated through various activities.

In 2019, Heritage Commission of West Bengal Government declared Buno Ramnath's Vite or Tol house of Buno Ramnath as the heritage place of Nabadwip.

== In Literature ==
Dinabandhu Mitra wrote about the Tyagi Purus (means Sacrificial men) in his book Dinabandhu Rachanasangraha based on the legend of Ramnath Tarkasiddhanta.
