= Nabadwip Bakultala High School =

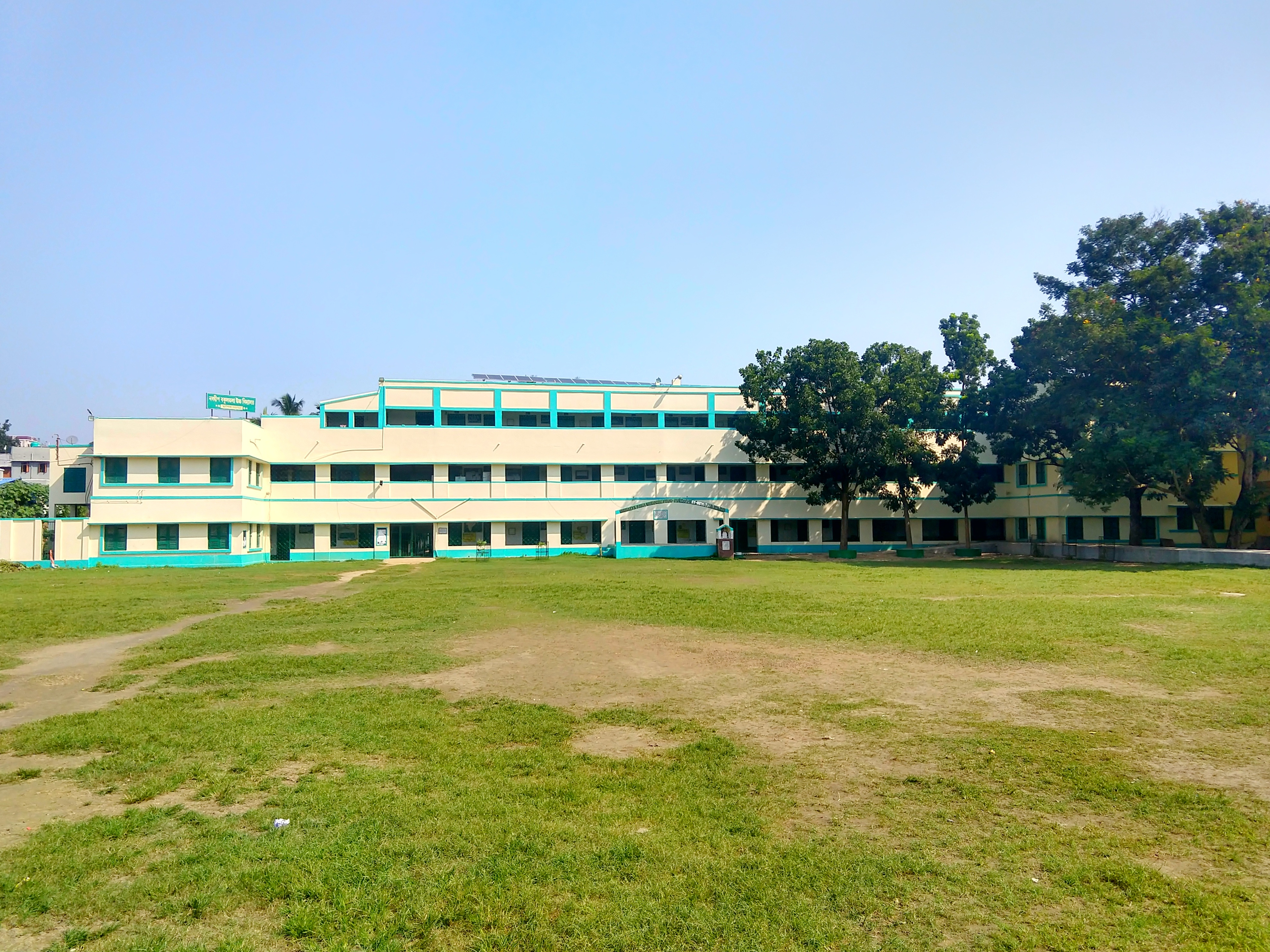
- Nabadwip Bakultala High School

Location
- Netaji Subhash Road; Nabadwip, West Bengal, 741302; India; 23°24′28.5″N 88°21′53.1″E

Information
- School type: Government Sponsored, Higher Secondary
- Established: 1875; 151 years ago (As Nabadwip Banga Vidyalaya)
- School board: WBBSE, WBCHSE
- Circle: Nabadwip Urban
- School code: 19101801407 (UDISE code)
- President: Administrator
- Headmaster: Sri Dipankar Saha
- Assistant Headmaster: Sri Asoke Kumar Pal
- Secondary years taught: 5th - 10th and 11th - 12th grades
- Gender: Boys'
- Age range: 10+ to 18+
- Enrollment: 1852
- Classes: 8
- Language: Bengali, English
- Houses: Rabindranath Tagore House Netaji Subhash Chandra Bose House; Jagadish Chandra Bose House Vivekananda House
- Colors: Green, White
- Song: "Amader Bakultala" ("আমাদের বকুলতলা" in Bengali language)
- Sports: Football; Cricket Chess Table Tennis
- Nickname: NBHS
- Yearbook: Bakulkatha
- Alumni: Gour Kishore Ghosh Samar Ghosh; Dr. Ujjwal Maulik; Dr. Santosh Kapuria Dr. Pritam Sukul
- Website: NBHS

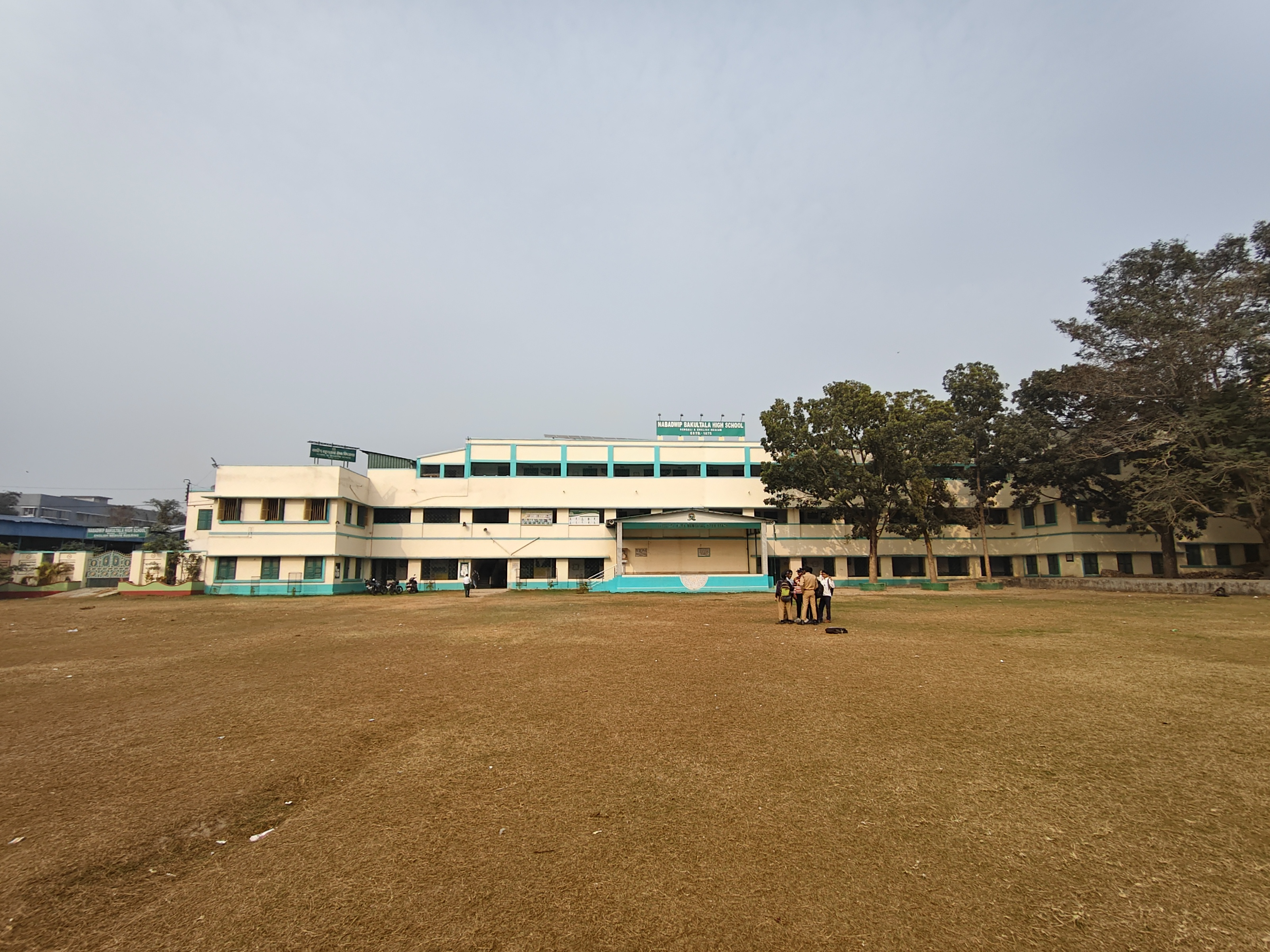
The school front view in 2026

Nabadwip Bakultala High School is a government sponsored higher secondary boys' school situated in Nabadwip, West Bengal, India. This school was established in 1875 during the British Colonial period of India. The school now provides classes from V to XII, subjects from Humanities, Science, and Commerce domains alongwith two Vocational Streams.

== History ==
This school was founded primarily with the name 'Nabadwip Banga Vidyalaya' in the year 1875 at another place, where now situated a girls' school namely Nabadwip Bakultala Balika Vidyalaya. In those days, the surrounding remained in cheery echoing of children. As lessons were started under a Spanish Cheery tree ('বকুল' in Bengali language), it came to be known as 'Bakultala School' by the people. Every year 3 January is observed as the foundation day of school. Though started as a primary school, the primary section was discontinued later. It became a high school in 1924. The first secretary of the school was Jana Ranjan Roy (1925 - 1928) and the first president was the S.D.O. (Ex-officio) of Sadar Subdivision, Nadia (01/01/1925 - 23/12/1966). Rajendraprasad Choudhury was the first Headmaster of the school. Headmasters Shri Shashibhushan Tarafdar (1924 - 1942) and Shri Nityaniranjan Kabiraj (1942 - 1960) are being remembered greatly in the history of the school.

== About School ==
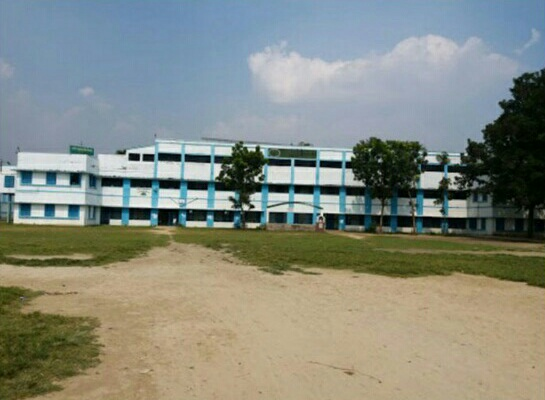
Front view of Nabadwip Bakultala High School in 2021

This school is situated beside Nabadwip Municipality. There are about 40 classrooms distributed among two three-storied and one one-storied building. There are separate laboratories of Physics, Chemistry, Mathematics, ICT, Computer, Biology and Geography. Students can use library using card. Students can take part in N C C. Now there are 34 teachers and 9 teaching-staffs in this school. Nabadwip Bakultala High School is one of the oldest higher secondary schools of Nabadwip as well as Nadia district. Near about 1852 students read in this school. The yearly magazine 'Bakulkatha' was published in 2018. Every year the handwritten wall-magazine 'Bakulkunri' (বকুলকুঁড়ি) is being published as well.

The school observed the Sesquicentenial Celebration (Completion of 150 years) with year-long schedule of activities which commenced on 3 January 2023 and concluded on 3 January 2024.

== Medium ==
The primary medium of education is Bengali. Students are able to give exam in English version in the HS section. Since 2018, Class V to X students have been able to read in English medium, starting from class V batch and subsequently the higher classes next years.

== Subjects Offered ==
The subject combination available for Higher Secondary stage (classes XI-XII) is as follows:

- First Language: Bengali (BNGA)
- Second Language: English (ENGB)
- Compulsory Elective (3 subjects to be chosen) and Optional Elective (1 subject may be chosen). These subjects must be chosen from the following bucket, and choices must be confined to only one Set.

Set I:

- Physics (PHYS) or Nutrition (NUTN)
- Chemistry (CHEM) or Geography (GEGR)
- Mathematics (MATH)
- Biological Science (BIOS)
- Computer Science (COMS) or Modern Computer Application (COMA) or Environmental Science (EVSC)
- Vocational: Plumbing (PLBV) or Power (POWV)

Set II:

- Accountancy (ACCT)
- Business Studies (BSTD)
- Commercial Law and Preliminaries of Auditing (CLPA)
- Costing and Taxation (CSTX)
- Modern Computer Application (COMA) or Environment Studies (ENVS)
- Business Mathematics and Basic Statistics (BMBS)
- Vocational: Plumbing (PLBV) or Power (POWV)

Set III:

- Political Science (POLS) or Biological Science (BIOS)
- Education (EDCN) or Nutrition (NUTN)
- Sanskrit (SNSK) or Basic Mathematics for Social Sciences (BMSS)
- Philosophy (PHIL)
- History (HIST)
- Geography (GEGR)
- Modern Computer Application (COMA) or Environment Studies (ENVS)
- Vocational: Plumbing (PLBV) or Power (POWV)

== Nabadwip Bakultala Vidyalaya Praktan Chhatra Sammilani ==
There is an alumni association named Nabadwip Bakultala Vidyalaya Praktan Chhatra Sammilani , established in 1990; functioning as a distinct but connected community of ex-students. The association conducts various programmes throughout the year. A primary school named Nabadwip Bakultala School of Education is run by NBVPCS. An open schooling study centre under WBCROS, Nabadwip Bakultala Rabindra Mukta Vidyalaya is run by the organisation. A study centre under Netaji Subhas Open University is also run by the association. The association has spread to Kolkata, although headquartered in a separate building situated adjacent to the school campus. A magazine named বকুলতলা প্রাক্তনী সমাচার (Bakultala Praktanee Samachar) is published from the organisation on the 10th day of every month.

== Notable alumni ==
The alumni network is strong. The ex-students are spread worldwide and established in own fields. Some of the notable persons are:

- Gour Kishore Ghosh, Writer
- Samar Ghosh, Ex-Chief secretary of Government of West Bengal
- Swami Suhitananda, Vice President of Ramakrishna Math and Ramakrishna Mission
- Santosh Kapuria, Professor at IIT Delhi
- Ujjwal Maulik, Scientist and Professor at Jadavpur University
- Nirmalya Sengupta
- Dr. Pritam Sukul, Senior Medical Scientist at University of Rostock
