= Nabadwip =

Ancient city in West Bengal, India

- City
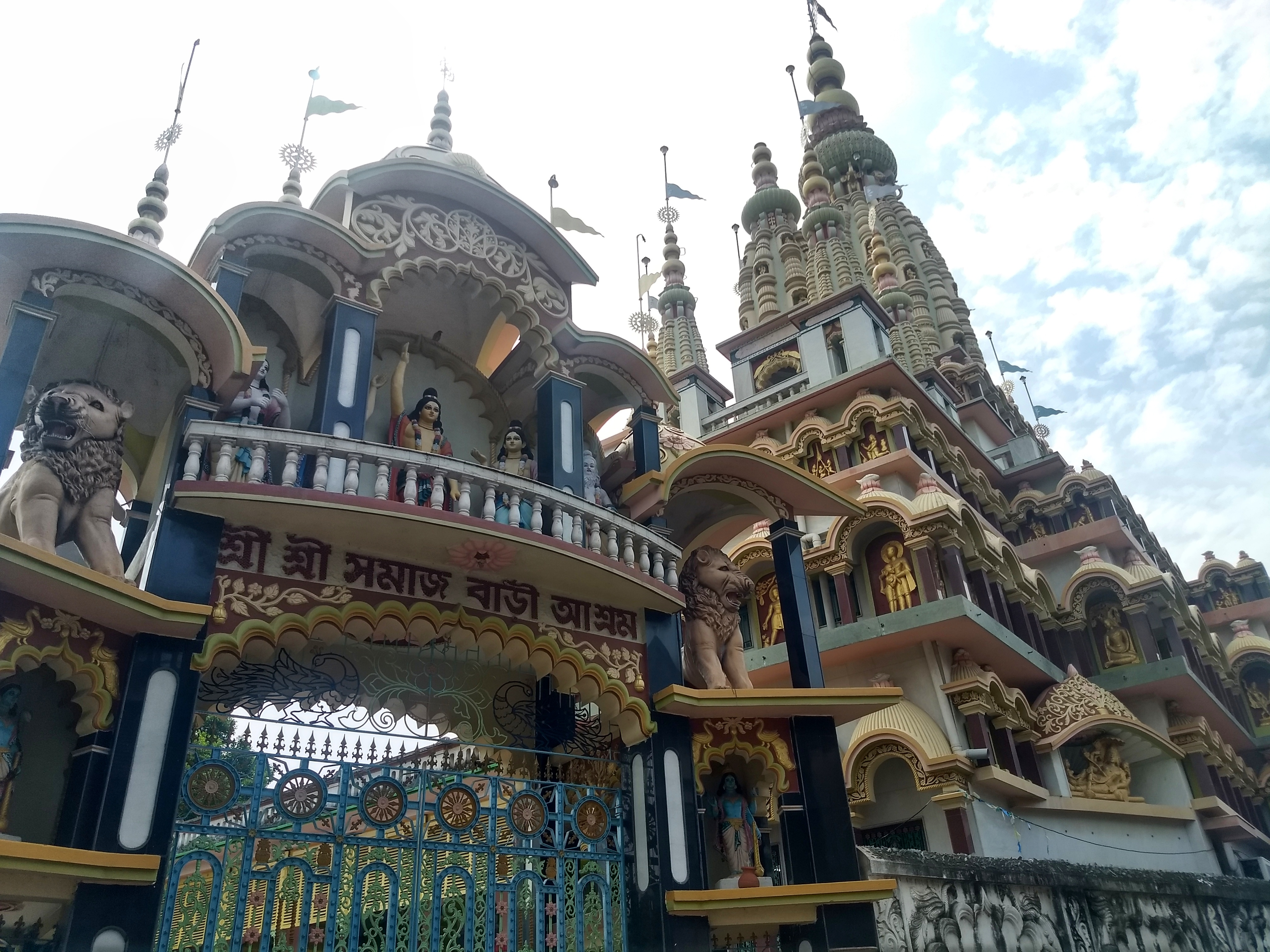
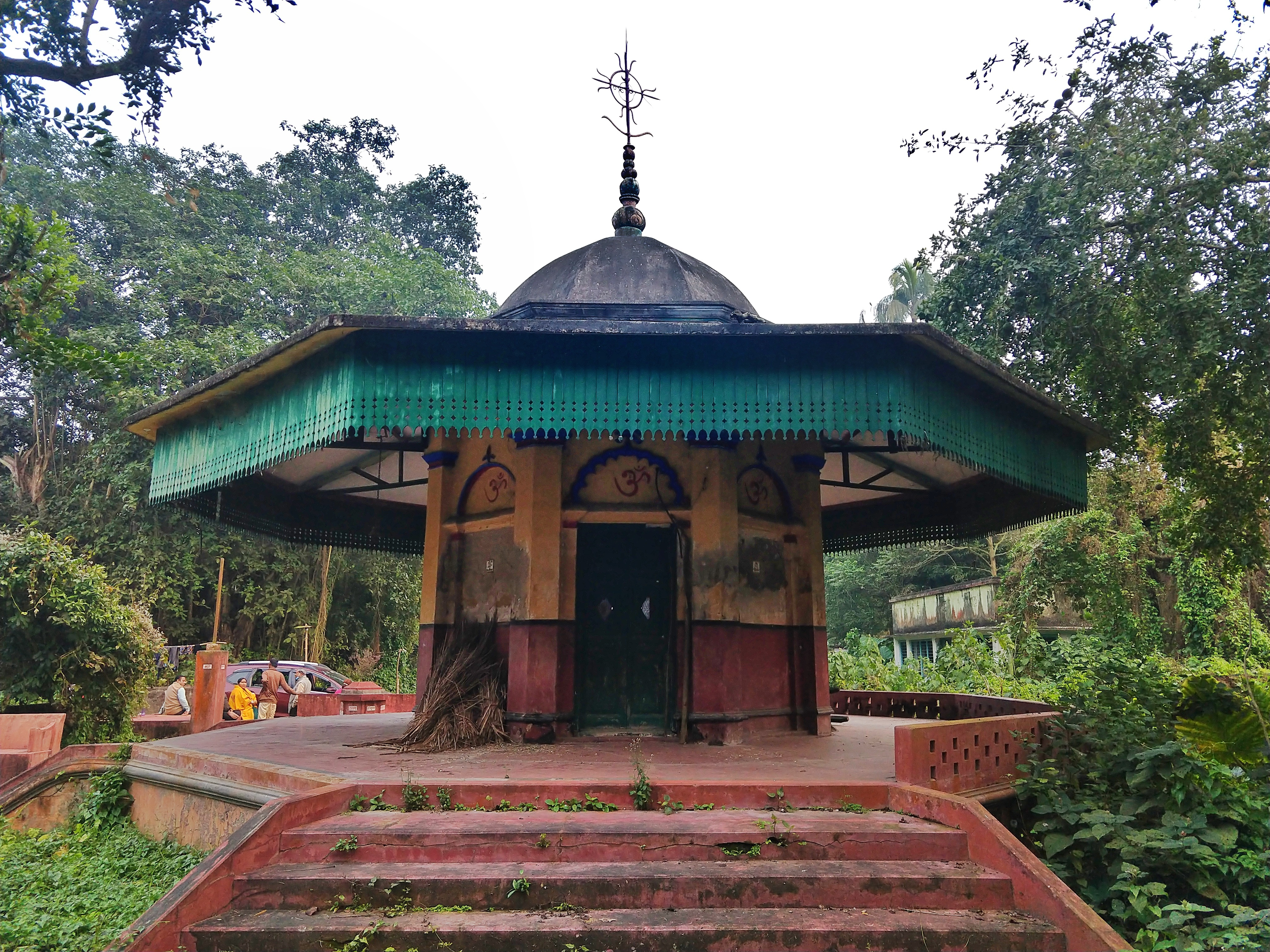
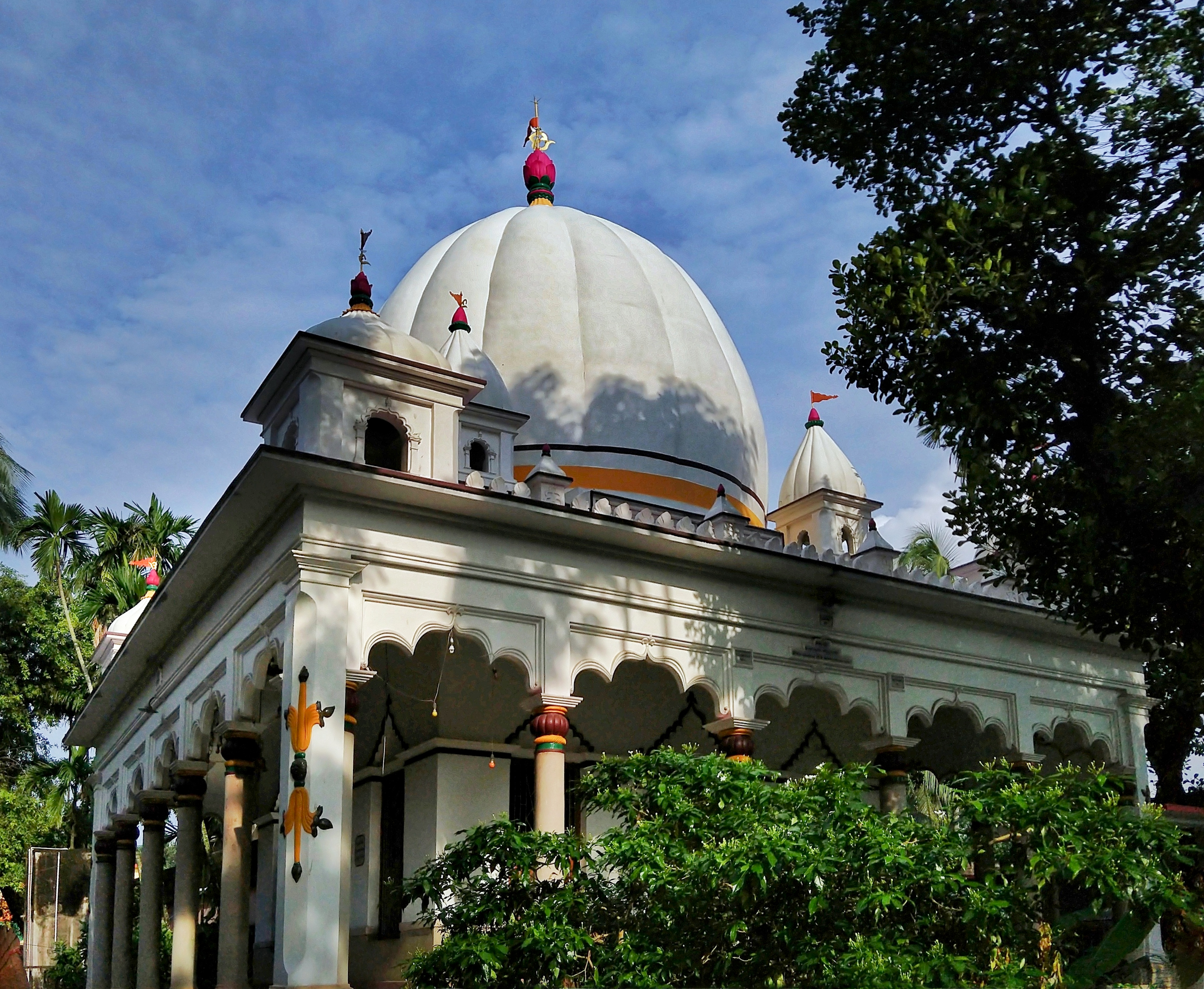
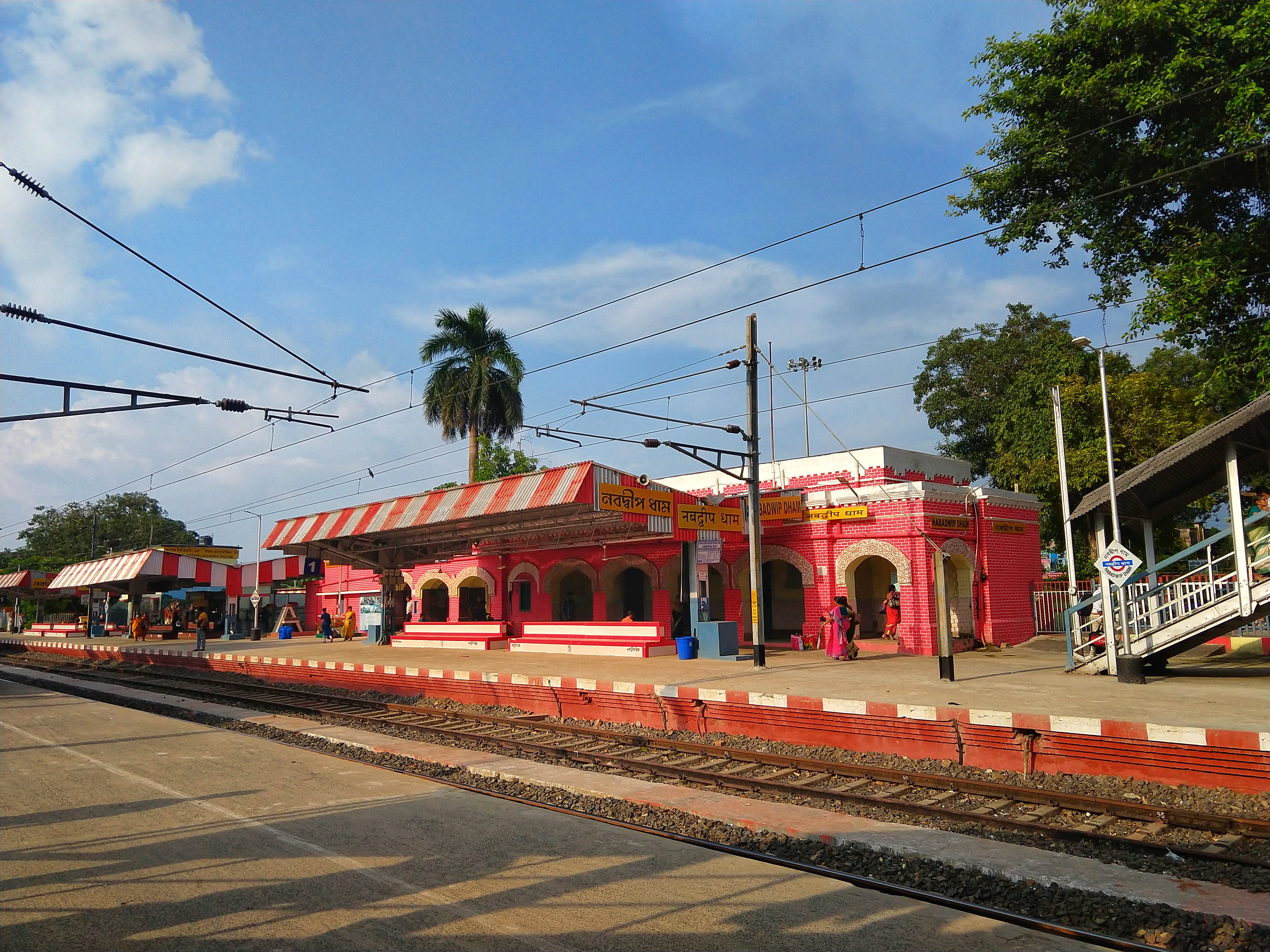
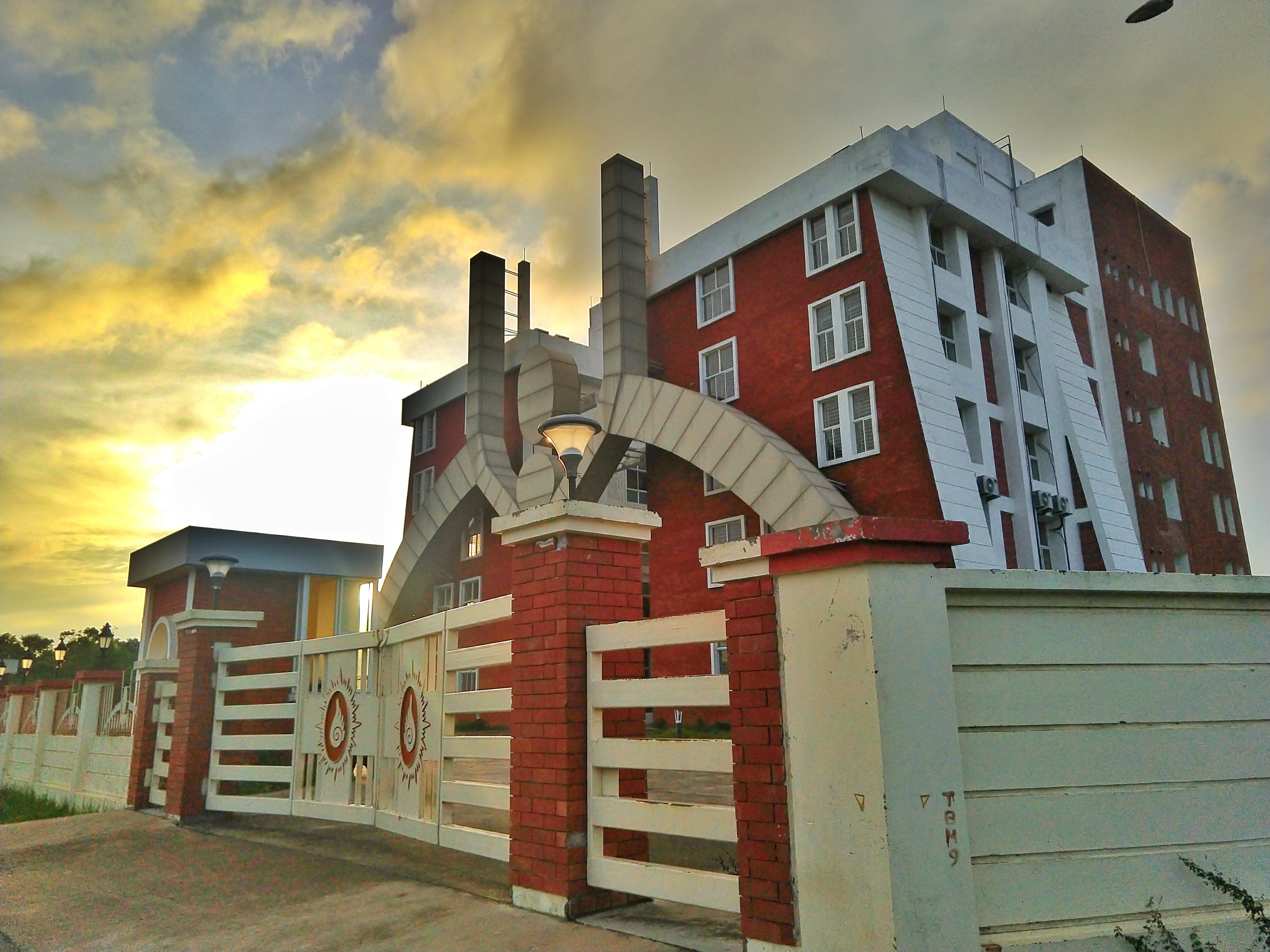
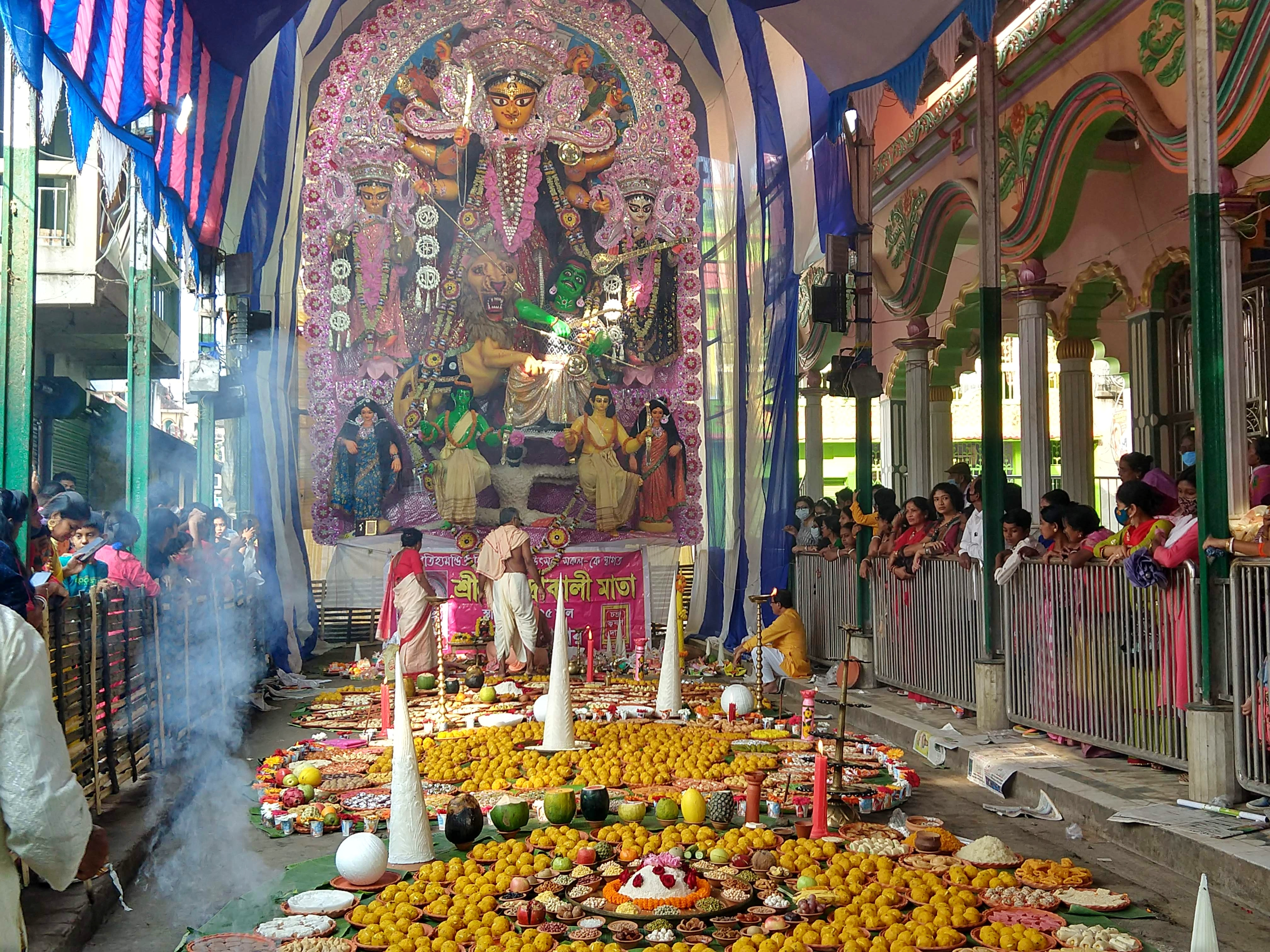
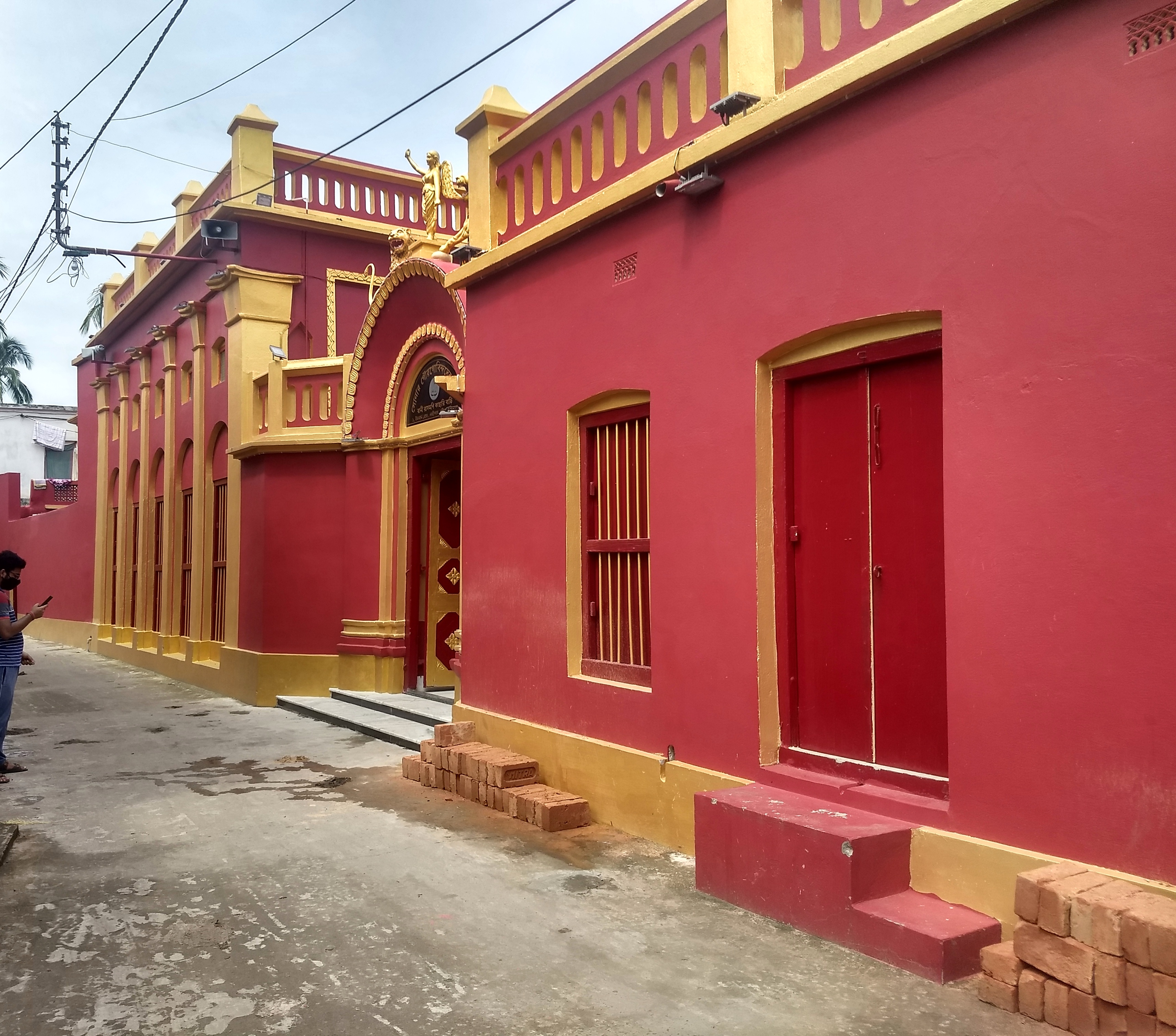
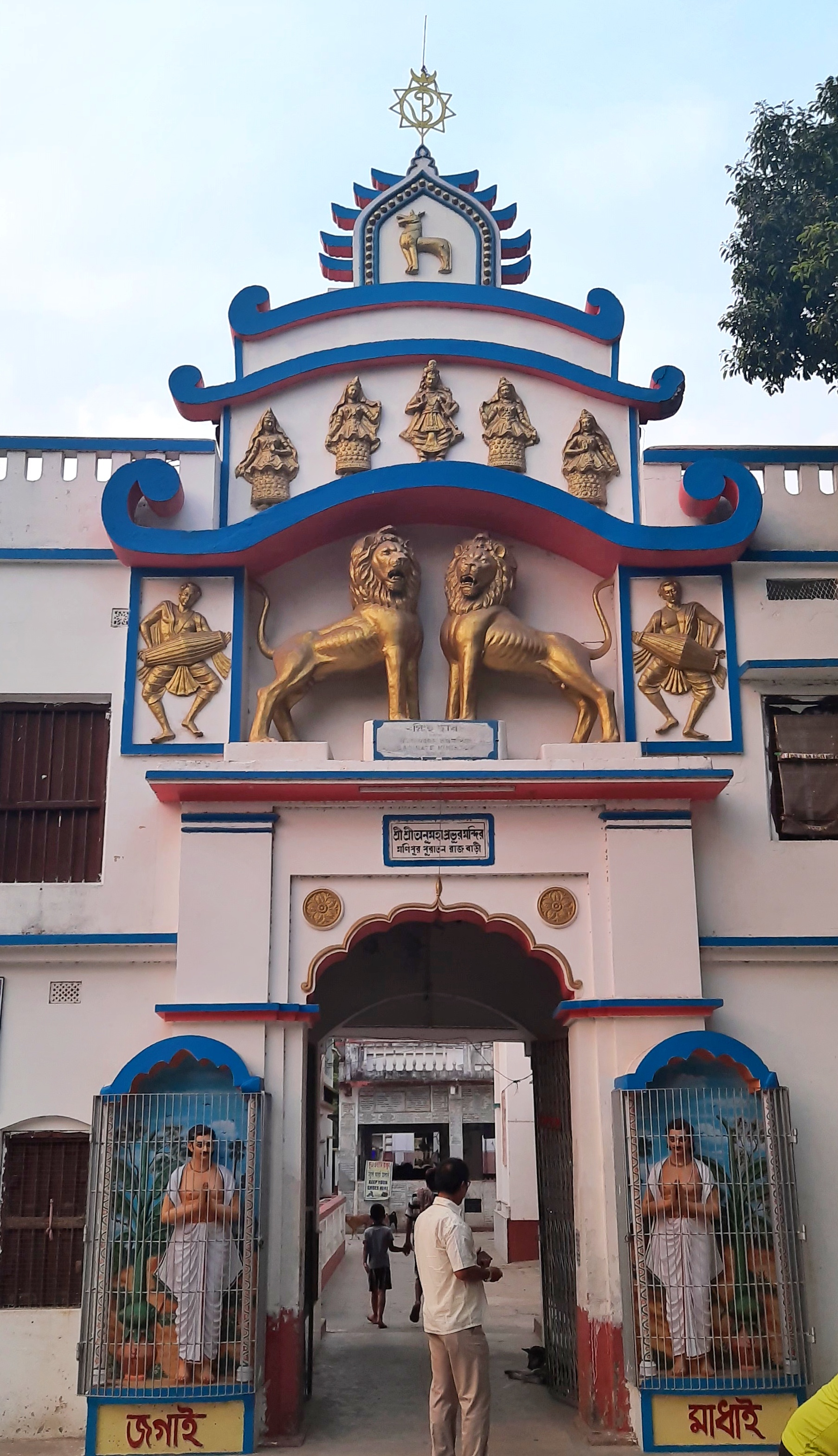
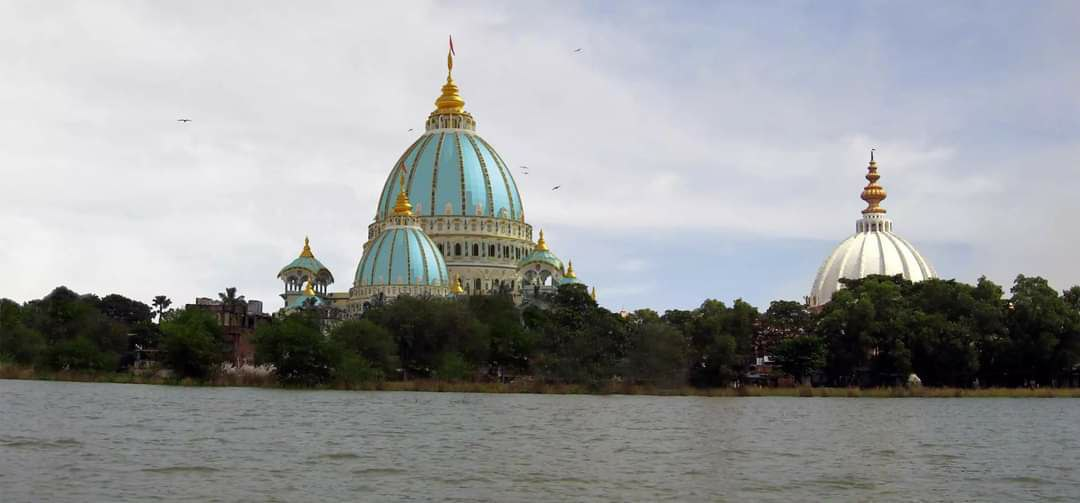
- Facade of Somaj Bari Shiva temple at Ramachandrapur Bhajan Ashram Mahanirban Math Nabadwip dham railway station Nabadwip Sanskrit Charcha Kendra Shakta rash Rani Rashmoni Kachari Bari manipur Rajbari Skyline of Mayapur across the Ganges
- Nickname: Oxford of the East
- Location in West Bengal, India Nabadwip (India)
- Coordinates: 23.42°N 88.37°E
- Country: India
- State: West Bengal
- District: Nadia

Government
  - Type: Municipality
  - Body: Nabadwip Municipality

Area
  - City: 9.81 km^{2} (3.79 sq mi)
- Elevation: 14 m (46 ft)

Population (2011)
  - City: 125,543
  - Density: 12,800/km^{2} (33,100/sq mi)
  - Urban: 175,474
- Time zone: UTC+5:30 (IST)
- PIN: 741302
- Telephone code: 03472
- Vehicle registration: WB 51,52
- Lok Sabha constituency: Ranaghat
- Vidhan Sabha constituency: Nabadwip
- MLA: Srutisekhar Goswami
- MP: Jagannath Sarkar
- Website: nabadwipmunicipality.in
- Birth Place of Chaitanya Mahaprabhu

Nabadwip (Bengali pronunciation: [nɔbodːip]), also spelt Navadwip (নবদ্বীপ), historically known as Nadia, is a heritage city in Nadia district in the Indian state of West Bengal under the Presidency division. It is a historical holy place of Hindus, and is the birthplace of Chaitanya Mahaprabhu. Located on the western bank of the Hooghly River at its confluence with Jalangi River, it is considered to have been founded in 1063 CE and even more earlier, and served as the old capital of the Sena dynasty.And it also served once upon a time as the capital of antibioted Bengal. A center of Sanskrit learning and philosophy in medieval India, the city is still noted for its traditional Sanskrit schools.

The Navya Nyaya school of logic reached its peak with the efforts of some well known contemporary philosophers of Nabadwip. The great Vaishnava saint, social reformer and an important figure of the Bhakti movement, Chaitanya Mahaprabhu (1486–1534) was born here. It was after Chaitanya Mahaprabhu's birth that Nabadwip became an important center of pilgrimage for the Vaishnavas worldwide as well as for Hindus in general. Many who follow Gaudiya Vaishnavism visit Nabadwip to celebrate the birthday of Shri Mahaprabhu, which, as per lunar calculations, occurs on Phalguni Purnima (i.e. on the Full moon day of February–March). This day is commonly known as Gaura-purnima. Aside from this, Nabadwip is visited for various other festivals like Dol Jatra and Rash purnima.

The Bhagirathi river originally flowed down the west of Nabadwip in the past, forming a natural boundary between the districts of Purba Bardhaman and Nadia. With time it has shifted its course to where it is at present, cutting the city off from the rest of the Nadia district.

== Etymology ==
The name of the city is derived from the conjunction of the Bengali words /naba/ (new) and /dwipa/ (island) meaning New-island. In the down stream of the river Ganges, the alluvial deposits carried over during its course that starts at the Himalayas, were gradually deposited, forming a new island which is present day's Nabadwip. The name Nabadwip and Nadia has the same connotation of the same geographical location flanked at west and north by the Ganges at earlier times. Kabi Karnapur used Nabadwip as Nabīna dbīpaṁ (Bengali: নবীন দ্বীপং), mean New Island in his book Chaitanya Charitamritam

The claim that the name Nabadwip refers to an area comprising nine islets has no ground. There are many historical references in this respect. The misconception around the nomenclature of the name "Nabadwip" arose due to the publication of the book "Bhakti Ratnakar" of Narahari Chakraborty. Hence "Nabadwip" i.e. nine islands, namely Antardwip, Simantadwip, Rudradwip, Madhyadwip, Godrumdwip, Ritudwip, Jahnudwip, Modadrumdwip, and Koladwip. However again, it is to mention that all these islands are loosely scattered over a vast geographical area that the Historians do not approve of the idea as being "Nabadwip".

== History ==
Although significant examples of the history of Nabadwip have been found since the Sen dynasty, various historians have been referring to Nabadwip in the Pala period. English historian John Clark Marshman mentioned Nabadwip as the capital of Adishur.

=== Sen era ===
It is known from the Deopara stone slab of Rajshahi district that Raja Samanta Sena, a resident of Karnataka, lived in the Ganges-Pulin in his last years when he was defeated by his tenants and zamindars. According to the eminent historian Harprasad Shastri, Samanta Sen lived on the shores of Bhagirathi, probably in Nabadwip in his last years. Prior to Gour, Nabadwip was the capital of Sena dynasty during the reigns of Ballal Sen and Lakshman Sen. They ruled Bengal from here in the period from 1159 to 1206. The Ballal Dhipi in the Bamanpukur area adjacent to Nabadwip, which is associated with the history of Sen dynasty, has been protected by the Archaeological Survey of India. During the reign of Lakshman Sen, in 1202 AD, Bakhtiyar Khalji invaded and plundered Nabadwip and defeated Lakshman Sen, a victory that led to Muslim rule in Bengal. At that time the prosperity of Nabadwip was particularly damaged. During the Muslim rule, various temples, golden monasteries and idols of Bengal and Nabadwip were destroyed.

=== Chaitanya era ===
The birth of Chaitanya Mahaprabhu is an important chapter of the fifteenth century. With the advent of Chaitanya Mahaprabhu, Vaishnava culture was well established in Nabadwip. However, even before the birth of Mahaprabhu, during the reign of Jalaluddin Fateh Shah (1481–87), royal fear appeared in Nabadwip. The ruling society and the Brahmin society obstructed the spread of Vaishnava culture in Nabadwip at that time. Many Brahmin scholars and common people had to leave Nabadwip at that time due to the oppression of the king. However, when Chand Kazi, the then ruler of Nabadwip, issued an order to the Vaishnava community to stop chanting, Mahaprabhu went to Kazi's house with his companions and convinced the Kazi to allow the chanting, which is the first instance of civil disobedience movement in the history of India. During Chaitanya and later, various Pandits-Sadhaks-Vidyalankars and Sanskrit Pandits were born in Nabadwip. During the period of Chaitanya, Basudev Sarvabhauma, Raghunath Shiromani, Raghunandan etc. and later Krishnananda Agamavagisha, Buno Ramnath etc., Nabadwip became the main center of Sanskrit practice and learning. At the time of Raja Rudra Roy, there were four thousand students and six hundred professors teaching in Nabadwip, leading to its nickname as the "Oxford of Bengal".

=== Next centuries ===
Buno Ramnath, Shankara Tarkabagish and other scholars and logicians made the name of Nabadwip famous in the eighteenth century. Shakti worship spread in Nabadwip during the time of Raja Krishnachandra of Nadia royal family. During the reign of Raja Krishnachandra Roy and later Raja Girish Chandra, the popularity, glory and pomp of Shakta Rash increased. Various temples and idols were established in that time.

== Geography ==
Nabadwip-Mayapur
R: temple, F: facility, H: historical site
Owing to space constraints in the small map, the actual locations in a larger map may vary slightly

== Demographics ==
In the 2011 census, Nabadwip Urban Agglomeration had a population of 175,474, out of which 90,810 were males and 84,664 were females. The 0–6 years population was 8,388. In education section, total literates in Nabadwip city are 102,793 of which 55,569 are males while 47,224 are females. Average literacy rate of Nabadwip city is 87.75 percent of which male and female literacy was 91.14 and 84.07 percent. Total children (0-6) in Nabadwip city are 8,388 as per figure from Census India report on 2011. There were 4,329 boys while 4,059 are girls. The child forms 6.68% of total population of Nabadwip City.

The following municipality and census towns were part of Nabadwip Urban Agglomeration in 2011 census: Nabadwip (M), Char Maijdia (CT), Char Brahmanagar (CT), Bablari Dewanganj (CT), Tiorkhali (CT), Gadigachha (CT) and Majdia.

As of 2001 India census, Nabadwip had a population of 115,036. Males constitute 51% of the population and females 49%. Nabadwip has an average literacy rate of 75%, higher than the national average of 59.5%: male literacy is 80%, and female literacy is 70%. In Nabadwip, 9% of the population is under 6 years of age.

=== Religion ===
Religion in Nabadwip (2011)
1. Hinduism (99.0%)
2. Islam (0.79%)
3. Christianity (0.04%)
4. Sikhism (0.01%)

Hinduism is the majority religion in Nabadwip city with 98.97% followers. Islam is second most popular religion in city of Nabadwip with approximately 0.79% following it. In Nabadwip, Christianity is followed by 0.04%, Jainism by 0.00%, Sikhism by 0.01% and Buddhism by 0.00%. Around 0.01% stated Other Religion, approximately 0.18% stated No Particular Religion.

== Civic administration ==
=== Police station ===
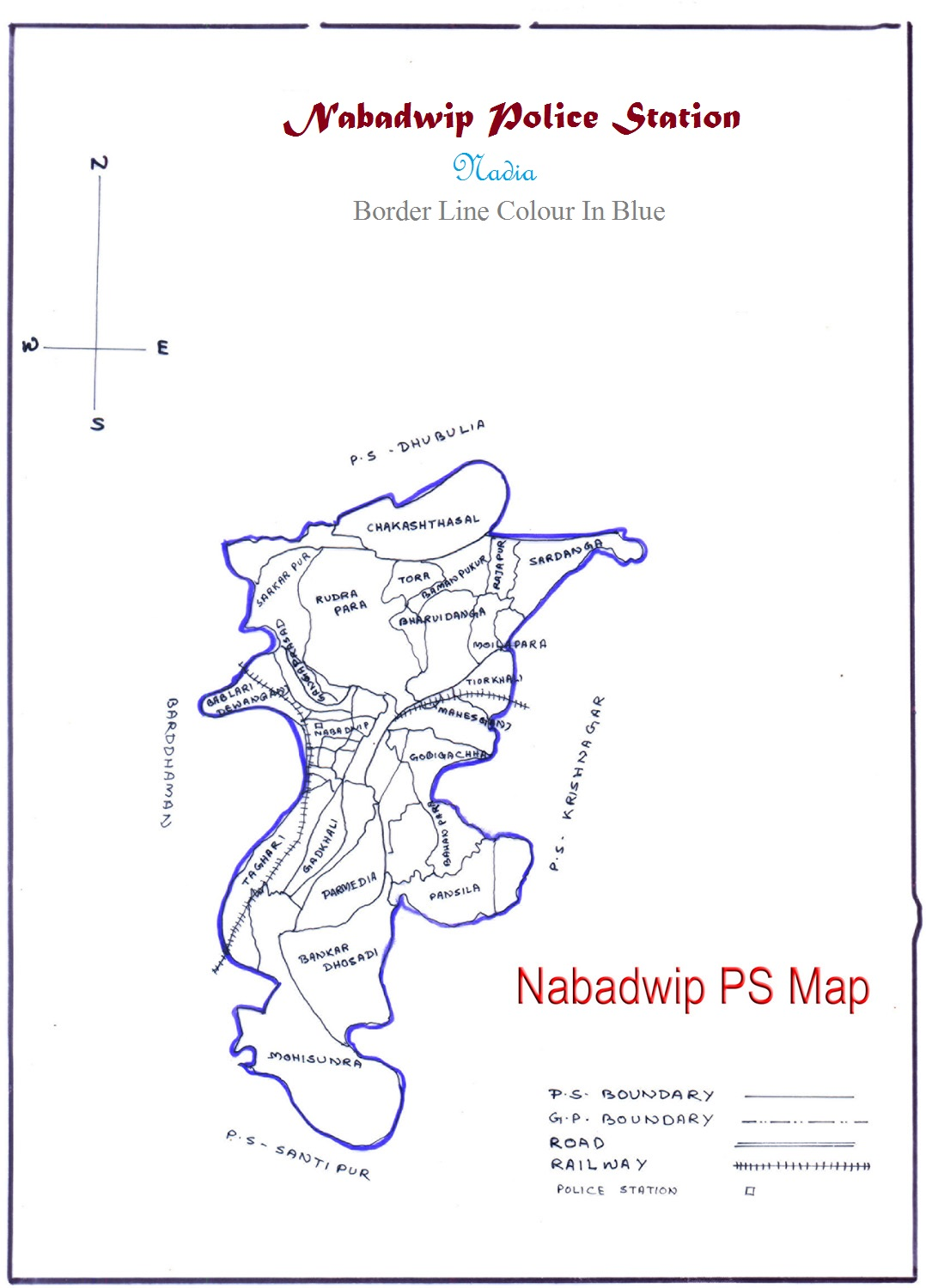
Nabadwip PS Map

Nabadwip police station has jurisdiction over Nabadwip municipality and the Nabadwip CD block. The total area covered by the police station is 102.94 km^{2} and the population covered is 260,843 (2001 census).

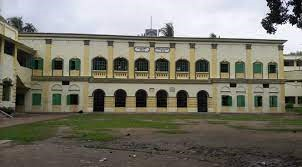
Nabadwip Hindu School

And the city is governed by its own self independent Nabadwip Municipality under the Presidency division of West Bengal. It's one of the ancient historical city of India.

== Education ==
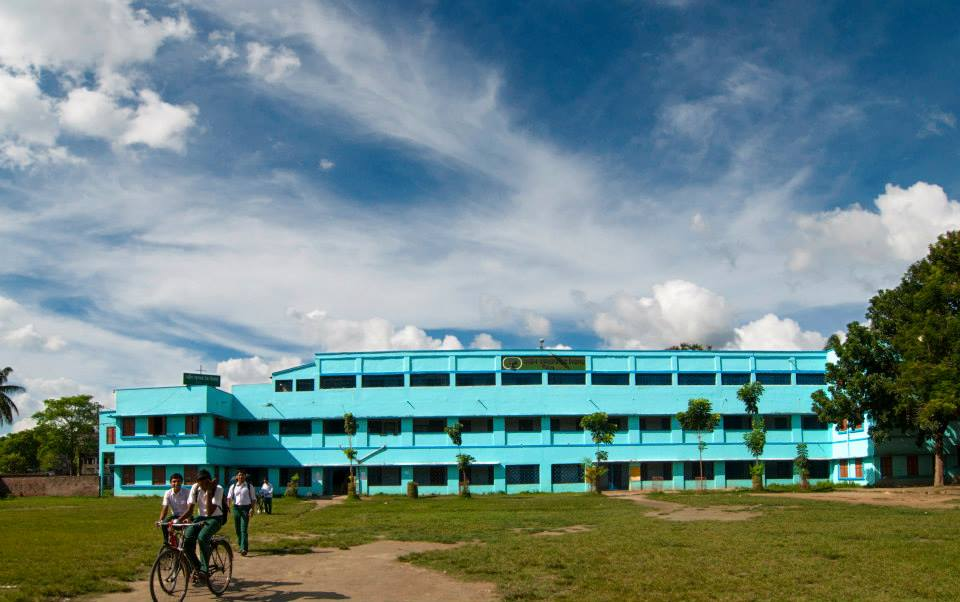
Nabadwip Bakultala High School

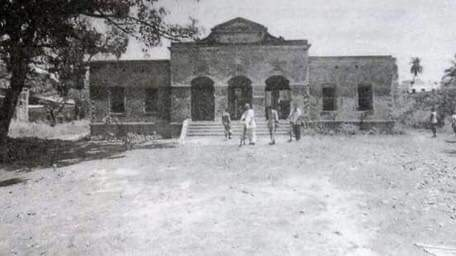
Old image of Pakatol of Prasanna Chandra Tarkaratna, Nabadwip

There are a total of 18 high and higher secondary schools in Nabadwip, Notables among them are Nabadwip Bakultala High School (1875), Nabadwip Hindu School (1873), Nabadwip Siksha Mandir (H.S), R.C.B Saraswatmandir, Jatiya Vidyalaya, Tarasundari Girls High School, Nabadwip Bakultala Girls High School, Nabadwip Balika Vidyalaya, Sudarshan High School, Techno India School (CBSE), Merryland Institute (CBSE) etc. There is a college namely Nabadwip Vidyasagar College (in the name of the Great Social Reformer and the Father of Bengali Prose, Ishwarchandra Vidyasagar) previously it was affaffiliated under University of Calcutta but currently it's affiliated under University of Kalyani.

== Climate ==
From April to June, the weather remains hot and temperature ranges from a maximum of 35 °C to a minimum of 26 °C. Monsoon season prevails during beginning-June to mid-September. Also retrieving monsoon from mid-October till mid-November.

The weather is quite pleasant, the summers and winters are moderate. The level of moisture increases during summers.

Climate data for Nabadwip
Month	Jan	Feb	Mar	Apr	May	Jun	Jul	Aug	Sep	Oct	Nov	Dec	Year
Mean daily maximum °C (°F)	26 (79)	29 (84)	34 (93)	37 (99)	37 (99)	35 (95)	33 (91)	33 (91)	33 (91)	33 (91)	31 (88)	27 (81)	32 (90)
Mean daily minimum °C (°F)	12 (54)	15 (59)	20 (68)	24 (75)	25 (77)	26 (79)	25 (77)	25 (77)	25 (77)	23 (73)	18 (64)	13 (55)	21 (70)
Average rainfall mm (inches)	1 (0.0)	2 (0.1)	3 (0.1)	4 (0.2)	107 (4.2)	243 (9.6)	377 (14.8)	321 (12.6)	280 (11.0)	129 (5.1)	1 (0.0)	1 (0.0)	1,469 (57.7)
Average rainy days	4	3	4	6	12	18	23	22	18	11	3	1	125
Average relative humidity (%)	63	55	52	58	65	75	83	83	81	74	66	65	68
Mean daily sunshine hours	6.6	7.1	7.3	7.8	7.3	4.1	3.0	3.4	3.9	5.9	6.4	6.6	5.8

== Festival ==
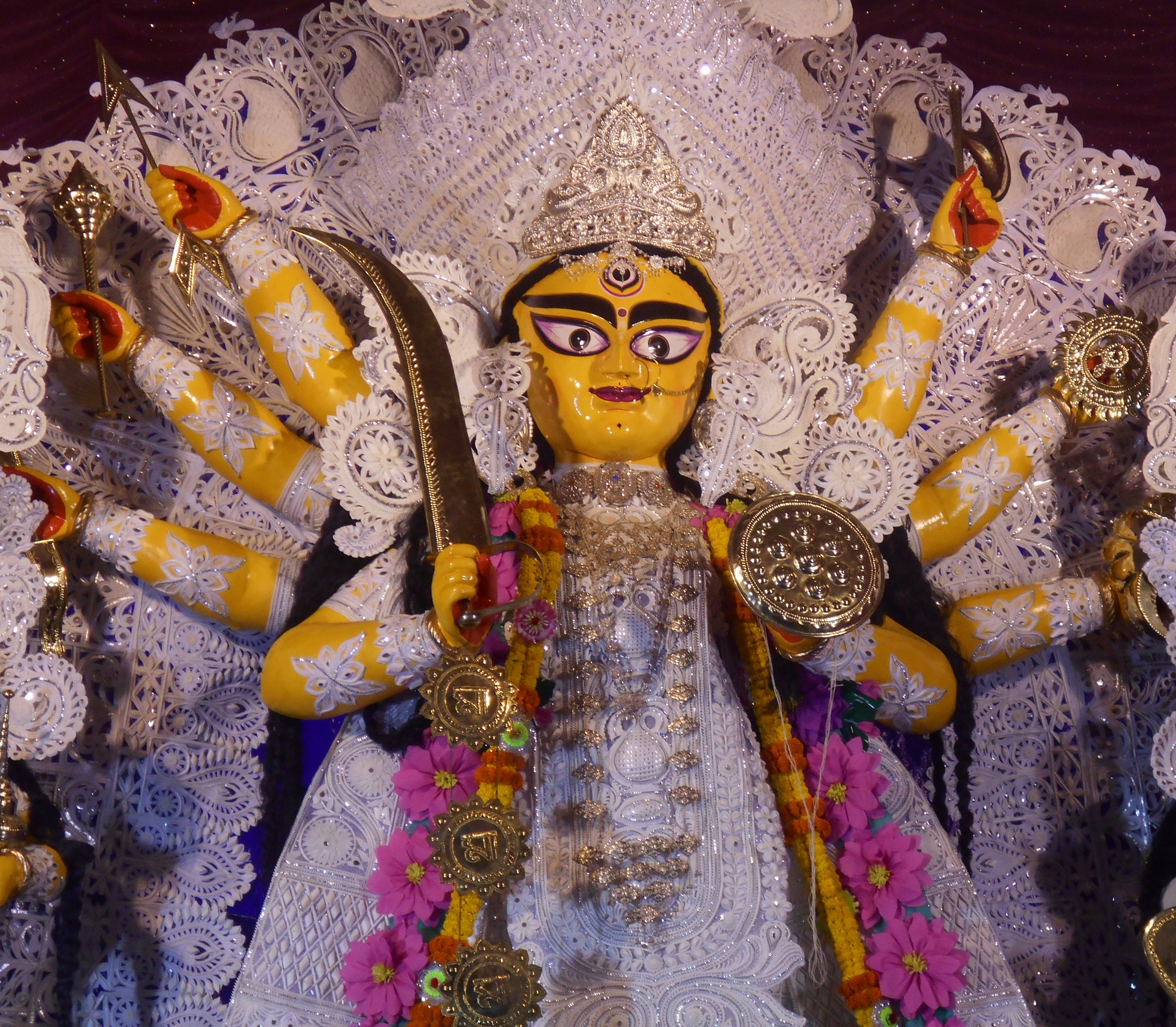
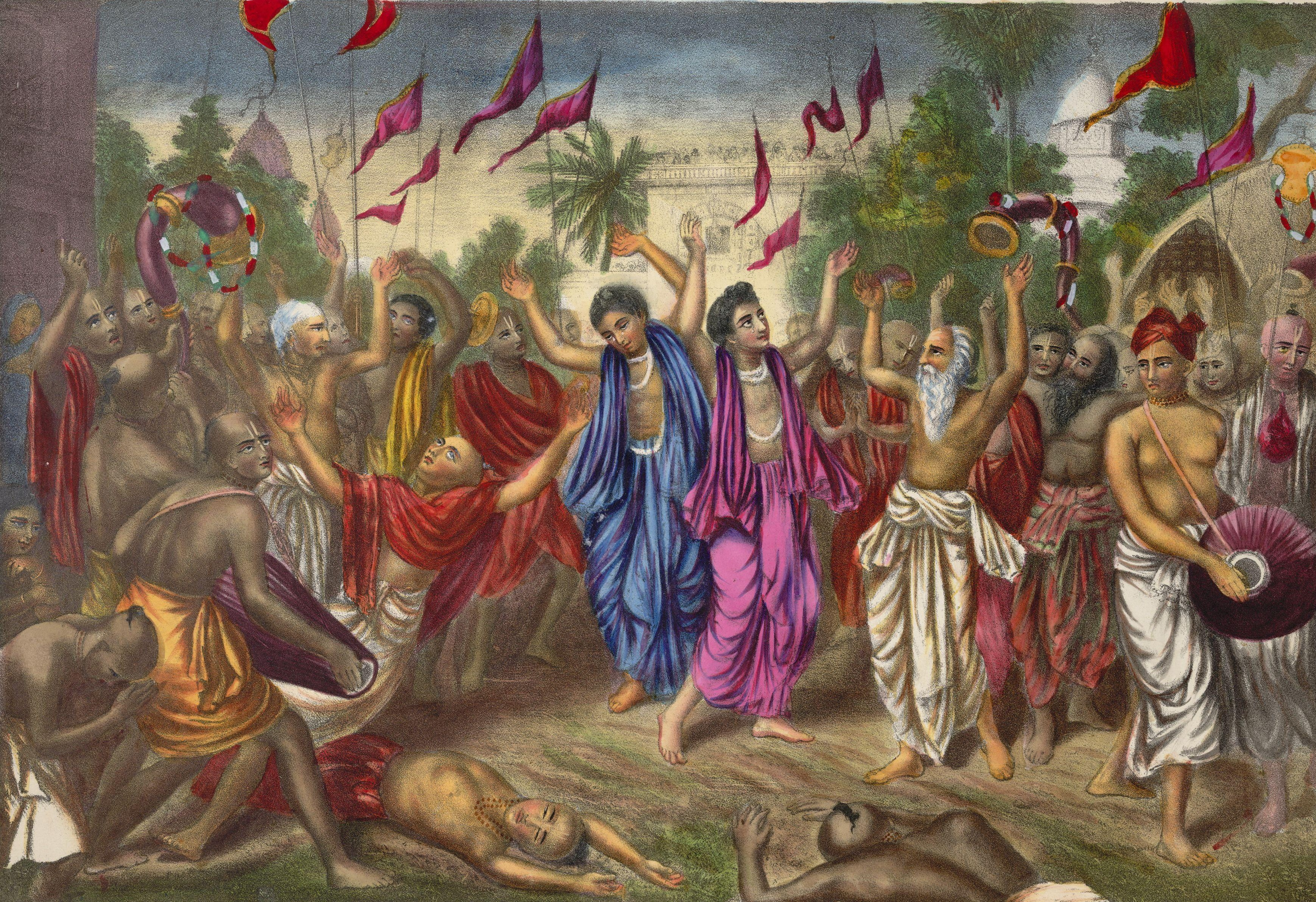
Left: Gourangini Mata in Rash jatra; Right: Chaitanya Mahaprabhu and Nityananda, is shown performing a 'kirtan' in the streets of Nabadwip, Bengal.

Many festivals are celebrated in Nabadwip throughout the year. Among them Shakta Rash, Dol Purnima Ratha Yatra are the most popular religious festivals in Nabadwip. Other major festivals are Kali Puja, Durga Puja, Gaura-purnima (the birthday of Chaitanya Mahaprabhu), Shiber Biye, Gajan, Pohela Boishakh, Jhulan Purnima etc. An extinct festival of Nabadwip is Dhulōṭa (Bengali: ধুলোট). It is the general conferences of Kirtaniyas, occurred in month of Magh. Typically, it is a thirteen-day-long Sankirtana, performed by renowned Kirtaniyas from all over Bengal who gathered in Nabadwip in that time.

=== Shakta Rash ===
Shakta Rash is the most celebrated age-old festival of Nabadwip, celebrated thirty-five days after the autumnal Durga puja celebration, or fifteen days after Kali puja in Kartik Purnima. The main feature of the festival is to make huge idols of different types of goddesses and to worship Shakti. After the patronize of Raja Krishnachandra Roy and mainly Girish Chandra Basu, Nabadwip Shakta Rash became more popular and glorious.

=== Rath Yatra ===
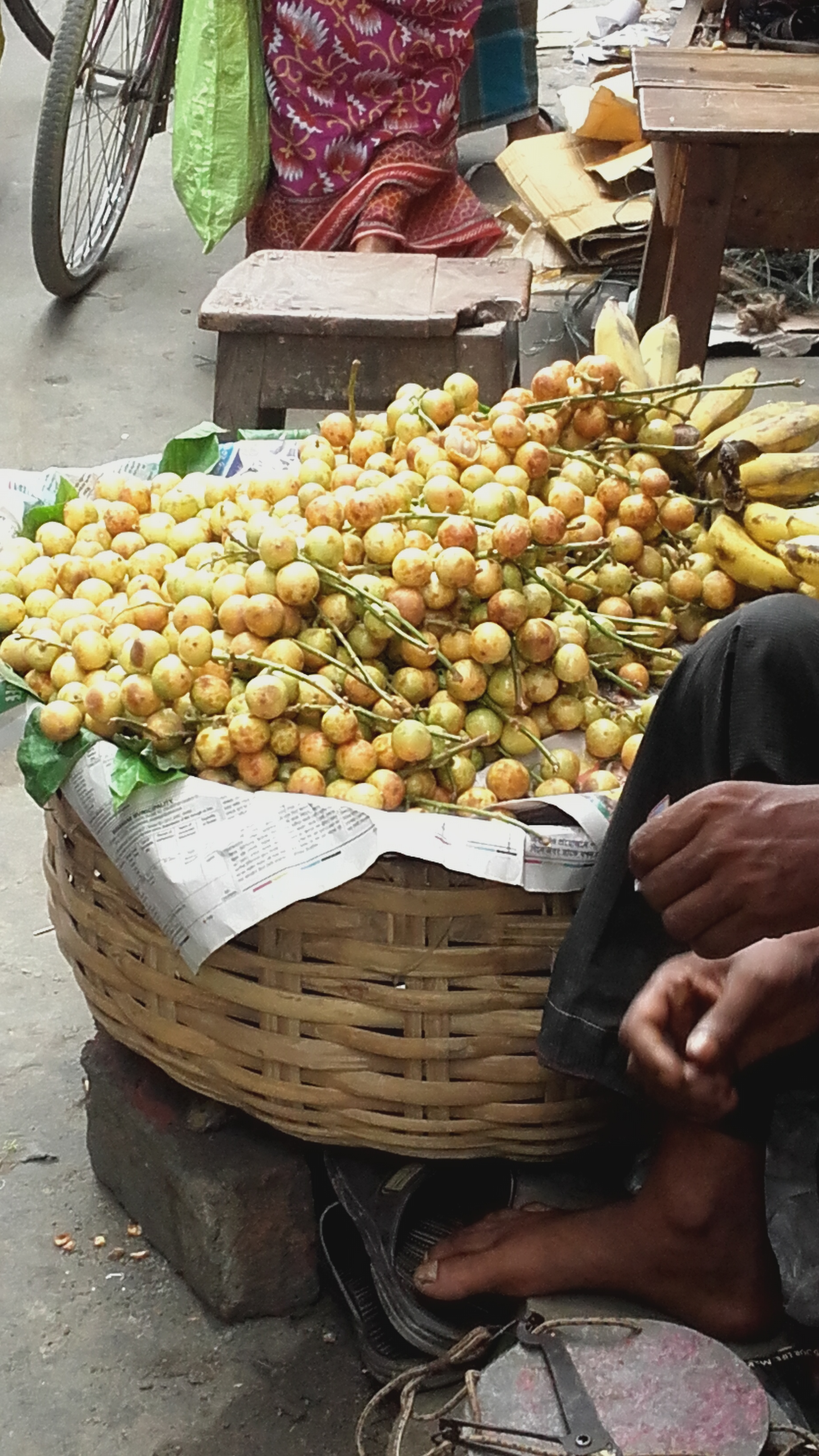
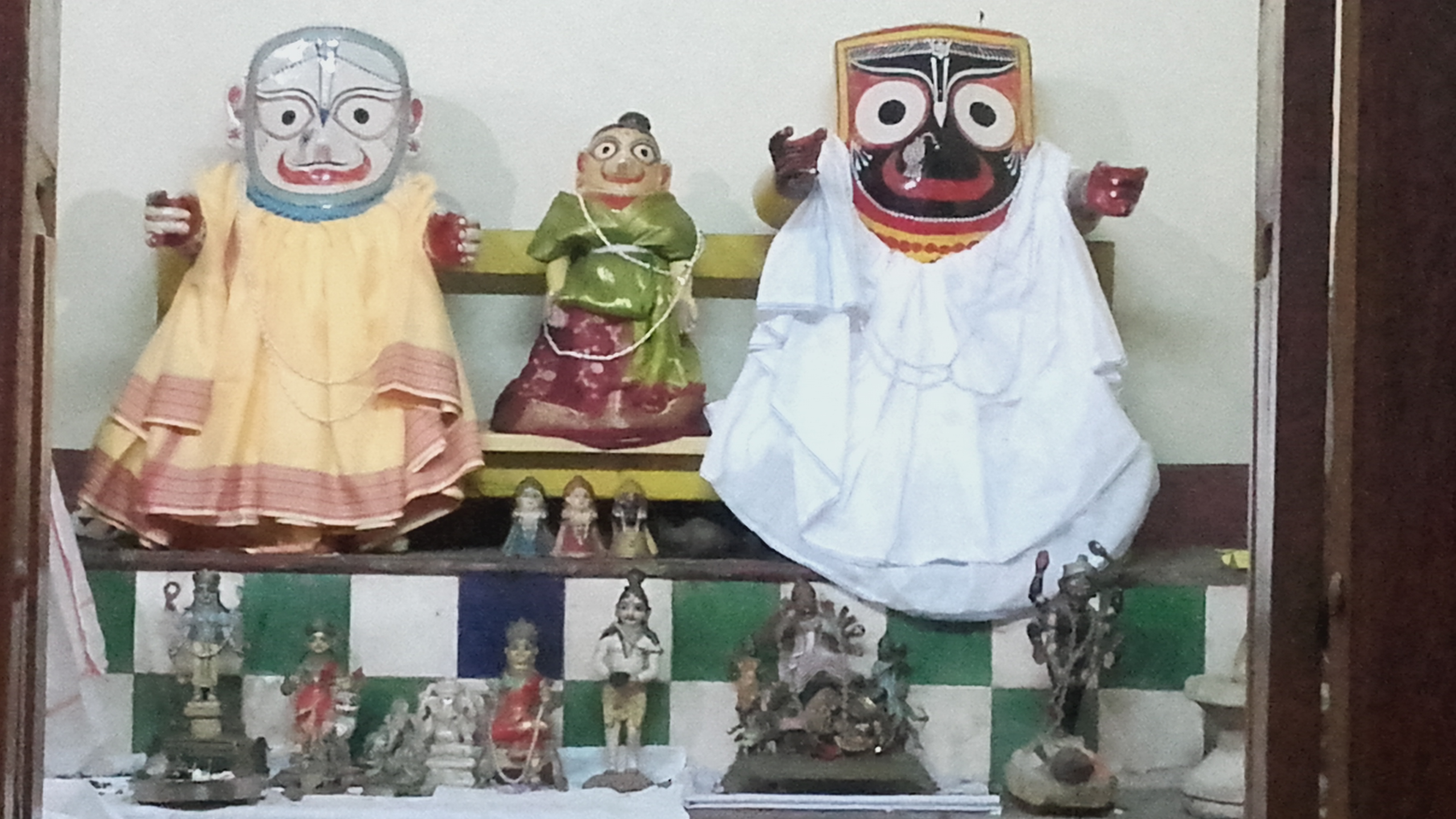
Left: Notkona fruit, specially found in Ratha Yatra in Nabadwip; Right: The Ratha-Yatra of Jagannath In Nabadwip features unusual images with hands.

Although Ratha Yatra is the main festival of Odisha, still Nabadwip have a pride of Ratha Yatra because of Chaitanya Mahaprabhu. Nearly 20-25 Ratha Chariots are bloom in this occasion. Here in Nabadwip one can found some exceptions like full hand idols of Lord Jagannatha. Here another speciality is a fruit called "Notkona" which is specially found in this eve, mainly brought from Assam. This Fruit is a vital part of Eastern part of Bengali.

== Transport ==
=== Rail services ===
Nabadwip Dham railway station is the main railway station of Nabadwip. The railway inaugurated in 1913. It is situated 103 km from Howrah on the Bandel-Nabadwip Dham–Katwa Branch Line. Nabadwip Dham Railway Station is seventh longest railway station of India (2362 ft) and 16th longest railway station in the world. Bishnupriya railway station is another Halt station of Nabadwip, 105 km from howrah junction and 38 km from katwa junction. And it also has Nabadwip Ghat and Amghata Halt Railway Station under Sealdah Railway Division on the other site of the Bhagirathi river.

Nabadwip Dham is 65 km from Bandel,105 km from Howrah and 111 km from Sealdah on the Bandel-Nabadwip–Katwa-Azimganj section of Eastern Railway. It has a great railway connectivity with North Bengal, Assam, Bihar, Odisha and Kolkata.. India's first Vande Bharat sleeper Express also runs via Nabadwip Dham.

It's one of the highest earning railway stations in West Bengal and Kolkata suburban railway.

=== Bus services ===
There is a good bus services in Nabadwip. All kinds of SBTC AND NBTC bus service are available. From Nabadwip bus stand, it connect with Krishnanagar, Shantipur, Phulia, Ranaghat, Chakdaha, Nadanghat, Kusumgram, Bardhaman, Karimpur, Samudragarh, Memari, Tarapith Via Katwa etc. A long-distance bus services like Durgapur, Asansol, Tarakeswar, Siliguri, Dinhata Via Berhampur, Maldah, Coochbehar, Bolpur, Puruliya, Bankura, Suri, Gangarampur provided here.
