= Ujjwal Maulik =

Indian Computer Scientist

- উজ্জ্বল মৌলিক
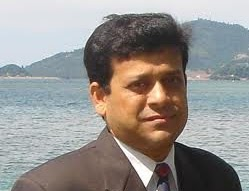
- Maulik in April 2021
- Education: University of Calcutta, Jadavpur University, Stanford University, Heidelberg University
- Scientific career
- Fields: Computer Science, AI, ML and Data Science
- Institutions: Jadavpur University

Ujjwal Maulik is an Indian computer scientist and educator. He is a professor and former head of the Department of Computer Science and Engineering at Jadavpur University, Kolkata, West Bengal, India. He has worked in many countries including India, US, Germany, France, Australia, China, Italy, Poland, Mexico, Slovenia and Hungary. He also held the position of the principal-in-charge and the head of the Department of Computer Science and Engineering at Kalyani Government Engineering College.

== Education ==
Maulik did his schooling from Nabadwip Bakultala High School, Nabadwip, Nadia and Ramakrishna Mission Vivekananda Centenary College, Rahara, 24 Parganas (North) both in West Bengal. Subsequently, he completed B.Sc. in physics and B. Tech. in computer science from University of Calcutta, Kolkata, West Bengal, India in 1986 and 1989. He also received his M. Tech. in computer science and Ph.D. in engineering in 1992 and 1997 at Jadavpur University, Kolkata, West Bengal, India. He did post-doctoral research at the University of New South Wales, Australia in 1999 and the University of Texas, Arlington, U.S. in 2001.

== Research and other activities ==
Maulik and his research group have contributed towards the development of science and engineering especially in the areas of AI in health care, Bioinformatics, intelligent transport system, supervised and unsupervised machine learning, and social and biological networks.

Maulik has received Fulbright Fellowship and worked in Stanford University, USA as a visiting professor, 2025 As an Alexander von Humboldt Experienced Researcher, he worked at the German Cancer Research Center and Ruprecht Karl University of Heidelberg, Germany in 2010, 2011, and 2012. He was a senior associate of the International Centre for Theoretical Physics (ICTP), Italy from 2012 to 2018. He has also worked in Viswa Bharati University, India, Los Alamos National laboratory, US, University of Maryland at Baltimore County, US, Heidelberg University, Germany, Tsinghua University, China, Sapienza University of Rome, Italy, University of Padova, Italy, Grenoble Institute of Technology, France, University of Warsaw, Poland and University of Ljubljana, Slovenia.

He is elected as Fellow of Indian National Science Academy (INSA) with effect from 2026 . He is also the fellow of the West Bengal Academy of Science and Technology, Indian National Academy of Engineering (INAE), National Academy Sciences India (NASI), the International Association for Pattern Recognition (IAPR), and the Institute of Electrical and Electronics Engineers (IEEE). He is also a Distinguish member of ACM. He is also a Distinguish Speaker of ACM and Distinguish Lecturer of IEEE CIS.

His research interests include data science, machine learning, bioinformatics, and the Internet of things. In these areas he has published twelve books and more than 400 research publications., have several patents and mentor two startups

== Selected publications ==
- Maulik, Ujjwal; Bandyopadhyay, Sanghamitra; Mukhopadhyay, Anirban (2011). Multiobjective Genetic Algorithms for Clustering. doi:10.1007/978-3-642-16615-0. ISBN 978-3-642-16614-3. S2CID 34010577.
- Bhattacharyya, Siddhartha; Maulik, Ujjwal (2013). Soft Computing for Image and Multimedia Data Processing. doi:10.1007/978-3-642-40255-5. ISBN 978-3-642-40254-8. S2CID 31008848.
- "Multiobjective Optimization Algorithms for Bioinformatics | the Galaxy Bookshop". 29 May 2024.

== Awards and recognition ==
- Humboldt Fellowship for Experience Researchers 2010-2012.
- Senior Associate, International Centre for Theoretical Physics (ICTP), 2012–2018
- Fellow, Indian National Academy of Engineering (FNAE), India, 2014
- Fellow, International Association of Pattern Recognition (FIAPR), US, 2018
- Fellow, Institute of Electrical and Electronics Engineers (IEEE),2020
- ACM Distinguished Member ACM, 2021
- Fellow, National Academy Sciences India (NASI), 2021
- ACM Distinguish Speaker, 2021
- Fellow, Asia-Pacific Artificial Intelligence Association (AAIA), Hong Kong, 2022
- Fulbright-Nehru Academic and Professional Excellence Fellowships(Research), USIEF, 2024-2025,.
- Elected Fellow, Indian National Science Academy (INSA), 2026
- Honorary Professor, University of Nottingham, Ningbo China, 2027.
