= Krishnachandra Roy =

Zamindar of Krishnagar, Nadia from 1728 to 1783

- Maharaja & Zamindar of Nadia

Raja of Nadia
- Reign: 1728 – 1783
- Predecessor: Raja Raghuram Ray
- Successor: Śiva Chandra Roy
- Born: c. 1710; Krishnanagar, Nadia Raj (now in West Bengal, India)
- Died: c. 1783 (aged 72–73); Nadia Raj (now in West Bengal, India)
Names
- Krishnachandra Roy
- House: Krishnanagar Rajbari
- Father: Raghuram Ray
- Religion: Hinduism

Maharaja Krishnachandra Roy (Note: Bengali: কৃষ্ণচন্দ্র রায়, Bengali pronunciation: [kɾiʃnot͡ʃɔnd̪ɾo rae̯].) (Bengali: কৃষ্ণচন্দ্র রায়, pronounced [kɾiʃnot͡ʃɔnd̪ɾo rae̯]; 1710–1783) was a raja and zamindar in Nadia (Note: now in West Bengal) from 1728 to 1782. He belonged to the Nadia Raj family and Shakta Brahmin tradition. He is credited not only with his resistance to the Mughal rule, but with his expansion and patronage of the arts in his kingdom. He was also a part of the group that conspired against Siraj ud-Daulah, which eventually lead to establishment of British rule in India.

== Reign ==
According to Atul Chandra Roy, Krishnachandra was "the most important man of the period in the Hindu society of Bengal." During his reign, Krishnachandra was highly influential for Hindu religious practices, for which reason Raja Rajballabh Sen of Bikrampur sought the assistance of Krishnachandra's pandits in supporting the overturning of the prohibition on Hindu widows' remarriage after his own daughter was widowed young. However, Krishnachandra strongly opposed the measure. To illustrate his feelings, legend relates, he had the visitors served the meat of a buffalo calf. Offended, they rejected the food on their honor as orthodox Hindus, and when challenged indicated that though it was not explicitly prohibited it was not practice nor custom. Krishnachandra's courtiers pointed out that they had taken umbrage at being presented something not forbidden but against custom, but that they expected Krishnachandra to accept their own unorthodox proposal. With the opposition of Krishnachandra, Rajballabh failed to achieve the change he sought.

Another legend connected to Krishnachandra involved the conflict between his Dewan, Raghunandan, and Manikchandra, then Dewan of Bardhaman Raj but in future to become Raja himself. After Raghunandan and Manikchandra quarreled, Manikchandra accused the other man of theft and had sufficient power to order and see to his execution. John McLane speculates that the root of the disagreement may have been Manikchandra's well-known resentment of Krishnachandra's patronage of the poet Bharatchandra, who had insulted the Burdwan raj family in a poem in retaliation for their depriving him of his own family estate.

Krishnachandra is also legendarily associated with the popularization of the worship of the goddess Jagaddhatri. According to the story, Krishnachandra had been imprisoned by Alivardi Khan for not paying tribute, causing him to miss the celebration of Durga Puja. Durga appeared to him in the form of Jagaddhatri and ordered him to worship her in one month, which he did, commissioning a sculptor to create a statue of the goddess. Bharatchandra Ray is said to be the court poet of Krishnachandra. He was also the patron of Sadhak Ramprasad Sen.

Krishna Chandra was part of the group, which included Jagat Seth, Mir Jafar, Omichund, Yar Lutuf Khan, Rai Durlabh and others, which conspired against Siraj ud-Daulah and colluded with Robert Clive, which lead to defeat of Siraj ud-Dullah in Battle of Plassey and eventual foundation of British rule in India. It is arguable that Krishnachandra or other members of the conspiracy group had no particular intention to found British rule in India, rather they were purely interested in their own political futures. Krishnachandra remained on friendly terms with the British and especially with Robert Clive. This relationship served him well in the 1760s when Bengal Nawab Mir Qasim ordered Krishnachandra's execution, for Clive not only overruled it but gifted Krishnachandra five cannons, the title maharaja, and governance as zamindar of the area of Krishnanagar.

== In popular culture ==
Raja Krishnachandra features in all stories depicting the wit of the famous court jester Gopal Bhar. While it is debated whether Gopal Bhar was real or fictitious, the corpus of stories paint a vigorous portrait of Krishnachandra, as a ruler who was whimsical but humble, sometimes eager to display his punitive power and at other times accepting the lessons that Gopal taught him through his jokes. His depiction also shows character depth in the sense that, while the king is clearly in awe of Gopal's wit, he is also jealous and seeking revenge due to past embarrassments caused by Gopal's scathing remarks, and this dichotomy often creates comic situations.
