= Nabadwip Municipality =

Municipal corporation in West Bengal, India

Nabadwip Municipality নবদ্বীপ পৌরসভা

Type
- Type: Municipality

History
- Founded: April 1, 1869; 157 years ago (as Nadia Town Committee)

Leadership
- Chairman: Vacant
- Vice Chairman: Vacant
- Administrator: Prasenjit Kundu, WBCS
- Seats: 24

Elections
- Last election: 2022
- Next election: 2027

Website
- www.nabadwipmunicipality.in

Footnotes
- Municipal Board collapsed after mass resignation of 21 councillors. The board has been dissolved and Administrator has been appointed until next Municipal Election.

Nabadwip Municipality is the self-governing and urban local body of the city Nabadwip of Nadia district of the Indian state West Bengal. It is a registered government organisation. The primary and main objective of Nabadwip Municipality is to provide all municipal facilities to all of the citizens.

== History ==
As per the Town Development Act, 1850, town committees were being founded in various towns. Nadia Town Committee was established in 1 April 1869 as per the Bengal Municipal Improvement Act, 1864. Election process was started in 1876. At that time, 8 of the 12 members were elected by the tax-payers and rest 4's were nominated. The fist meeting was held in the house of Late Gurudas Das in 1869. Eleven members along with two British men were present at that meeting. They were:

- Mr. Tuidy
- Mr. Sabi
- Madhabchandra Vidyaratna
- Prankrishna Bhatta
- Krishnakanta Shirratna
- Ramnath Tarkasiddhanta
- Laxmikanta Bhattacharya
- Prasanna Chandra Tarkaratna
- Shrikrsihna Bandyopadhyay
- Khsetranath Bhattacharya
- Gopalchandra Chattopadhyay

Initially, after the establishment in 1869, the name of the Nadia Town Committee was changed to Nadia Municipal Committee in 1877. Later in 1915, the municipal committee was awarded to municipality status and the name was finally set to Nabadwip Municipality.

== List of Chairman and Vice-chairman ==
List of Chairmen	List of Vice-chairmen
Mr. Tuidy from 01.04.1869; Mr. D G Taylor from 03.01.1883; Narahari Mukhopadhyay from 23.01.1885; Tarinicharan Chattopadhyay from 01.02.1894; Dwarakanath Bhattacharya Bahadur from 29.03.1896; Narahari Mukhopadhyay from 08.01.1899; Dwarakanath Bhattacharya Bahadur from 21.06.1899; Jagabandhu Bandyopadhyay from 21.08.1900; Jagneshwar Bhattacharya from 04.01.1902; Dwarakanath Bhattacharya Bahadur from 23.08.1903; Administrator from 19.02.1903; ★ ★ ★ ★; Dwarakanath Bhattacharya Bahadur from 09.01.1905; Satinath Mukherjee until 02.07.1921; Arunchandra Chatterjee from 03.07.1921; Debendranath Bagchi from 24.06.1922; Purnachandra Mukherjee from 24.03.1923; Janaranjan Mukherjee from 18.10.1924; ★ ★ ★ ★; Purnachandra Bagchi Bahadur from 27.10.1932; Rampada Chatterjee from 26.08.1939; Shailendranath Goswami from 28.09.1940; Dwijendralal Chatterjee from 03.05.1941; Nimaichand Goswami from 26.09.1942; Jitendranath Bagchi from 21.12.1945; Purnachandra Bagchi Bahadur from 11.12.1946 ।; Shachindramohan Nandi from 26.08.1947; Tinkari Bagchi from 24.11.1951; Purnachandra Bagchi Bahadur from 28.06.1952; Shachindramohan Nandi from 18.05.1956; Administrator from 30.05.1969; Bhairab Sharana Chattopadhyay from 30.12.1969; Administrator from 28.12.1971; Biswanath Mitra from 19.07.1981; Amarendranath Bagchi from 05.07.1990; Balai Pal from 18.08.1997; Radharaman Saha from 23.06.2000; Jibankrishna Saha from 30.05.2001; Pundarikakshya Saha from 21.06.2005; Bimankrishna Saha from 09.09.2009; Administrator from 2020; Bimankrishna Saha from 02.03.2022; Administrator from 03.07.2026	Mr. Sabi from 01.04.1869; Tarinicharan Chattopadhyay from 01.04.1879; Dinanath Bhattacharya from 14.04.1881; Tarinicharan Chattopadhyay from 18.03.1882; Anandamoy Ray from 23.10.1884; Dinanath Bhattacharya from 23.01.1885; Jagabandhu Bandyopadhyay from 29.10.1888; Panchanan Mukhopadhyay 01.02.1894; Binondlal Goswami 06.05.1897; Jagabandhu Bandyopadhyay from 30.01.1898; Panchanan Mukhopadhyay from 24.05.1900; Binodbihari Goswami from 25.08.1900; Jagneshwar Bhattacharya 13.07.1902; Benimadhab Bhattacharya 18.10.1902; ★ ★ ★ ★; Ramdas Mukhopadhyay from 23.08.1903; Administrator from 19.12.1903; Ramdas Mukherjee from 09.01.1905; ★ ★ ★; Janaranjan Ray from 01.09.1922; Ramnarayan Chatterjee from 02.09.1922; Janaranjan Ray from 15.11.1922; Sadananda Bhattacharya from 18.10.1924; ★ ★ ★ ★; Binaykrishna Mukherjee from 27.10.1932; Kalidas Chakraborty from 17.09.1936; Niranjan Modak from 26.08.1939; Bijan Kumar Mukherjee from 03.05.1941; Ganapati Mukherjee from 26.09.1942; Anukul Chandra Bhattacharya from 25.08.1943; Kumaresh Chandra Singharay from 26.08.1943; Jagabandhu Bhattacharya from 22.12.1945; Shyamapada Bhattacharya from 26.08.1947; Binaybhushan Mitra from 08.03.1950; Bhabanishankar Gupta from 24.11.1951; Binaybhushan Mitra from 18.06.1952; Jagabandhu Bhattacharya from 15.04.1954; Shankaricharan Chatterjee from 1805.1956; Aurobinda Ghosh from 16.05.1961; Jagabandhu Bhattacharya from 03.01.1964; Administrator from 30.05.1969; Jagajiban Goswami from 03.12.1969; Administrator from 28.12.1971; Amarendra Bagchi from 01.07.1981; Gour Das 05.07.1990; Ajay Singha 20.08.1997; Jibankrishna Saha 23.06.2000; Tusharkanti Bhattacharya from 30.05.2001; Shachindra Basak from 2015; Administrator from 2020; Sachindra Basak from 02.03.2022 to 18.06.2026; vacant since 18.06.2026

★ ★ No records have been found from 20.05.1905 - 10.09.1920, 08.11.1924 - 26.10.1932 and 16.06.1934 - 17.09.1939. It is found at page no. 47 of the Centenary Memorial Magazine of Nabadwip Hindu School that, Sadanada Bhattacharya was the chairman of Nabadwip Municipality from 1927 to 1932. The chairman of Nabadwip Municipality was Narayan Chandra Banerjee from 1919.

The election was to held in April or May, 2020 and the previous chairman and vice-chairman was to be valid till then. But due to COVID-19 pandemic and lockdown, this process was paused.

Subsequent Municipal Election was held on 27 February, 2022 and result was declared on 2 March, 2022.

After the Chairman was arrested by Police on 30 May, 2026, administrative unrest happened. The Vice-chairman resigned from his position on 18 June, 2026. Subsequently, 3 councillors and later on 3 July, 18 more councillors resigned from their position, making the municipal board dissolved. On 3 July 2026, administrator was appointed to take charge of the proceedings of the Municipality, until the next election.

== Departments ==
Serial No.	Divisions
1	General administration
2	Collection
3	Public works department (PWD)
4	Water Supply
5	Public health
6	Electricity
7	Education
8	Finance
9	Warehouse
