= Prasanna Chandra Tarkaratna =

Prasanna Chandra Tarkaratna was an Indian philosopher, scholar and logician. He was one of the best tol scholars of Nabadwip in the early 19th century. Prasanna Chandra was the student of Goloknath Nayaratna.

== Career ==
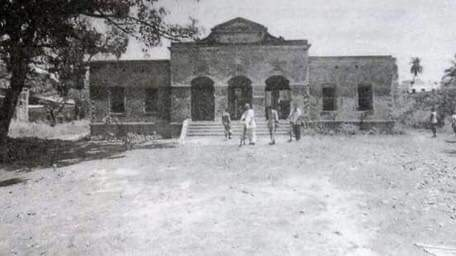
Old image of Pakatol of Prasanna Chandra Tarkaratna, Nabadwip

He used to teach by setting up a toll near Nabadwip Vidyasagar College. Later, a rich man named Babulal of Lucknow built his toll into a pucca building. Since then, it has been known as the Pakatol of Nabadwip. Students from different provinces like Mithila, Delhi, Lahore, Madras, Puri etc. came his tol and study there. Of his 14 resident students, five were from Delhi and Lahore, six from Mithila, two from Puri and one from Tamil Nadu.

He is also one of the eleven members present at the time of the establishment of Nabadwip Municipality.
