= Nadia Raj =

Bengali dynasty of Zamindars

- Country: Company rule in India; British India
- Current region: Nadia, West Bengal, India
- Founded: 1606; 420 years ago
- Founder: Raja Bhabananda Majumdar
- Final ruler: Raja Ksitish Chandra Roy
- Titles: Raja; Rai-Raiyan; Raja Bahadur
- Dissolution: 26 January 1950; 76 years ago

Nadia Raj was a dynasty of Zamindars and the rulers of territories that are now part of the Nadia district region of West Bengal, India. Their seat was at the city of Krishnanagar, Nadia. The estate of Nadia Raj was estimated to cover an area of 8,161 square kilometres (3,151 sq mi).

The rulers of Nadia Raj established many Sanskrit schools in Nadia, since they were the patron of Sanskrit literature and music. They were also patrons of Sanskrit culture in Bengal.

== History ==
The Nadia Raj family claims descent from Bhatta Narayana, who was a Kanyakubja Brahmin of the Sandilya Gotra. He was summoned from Kanyakubja (Kannauj) by Raja Adisura of Bengal, for the conduct of ceremonies of purification.

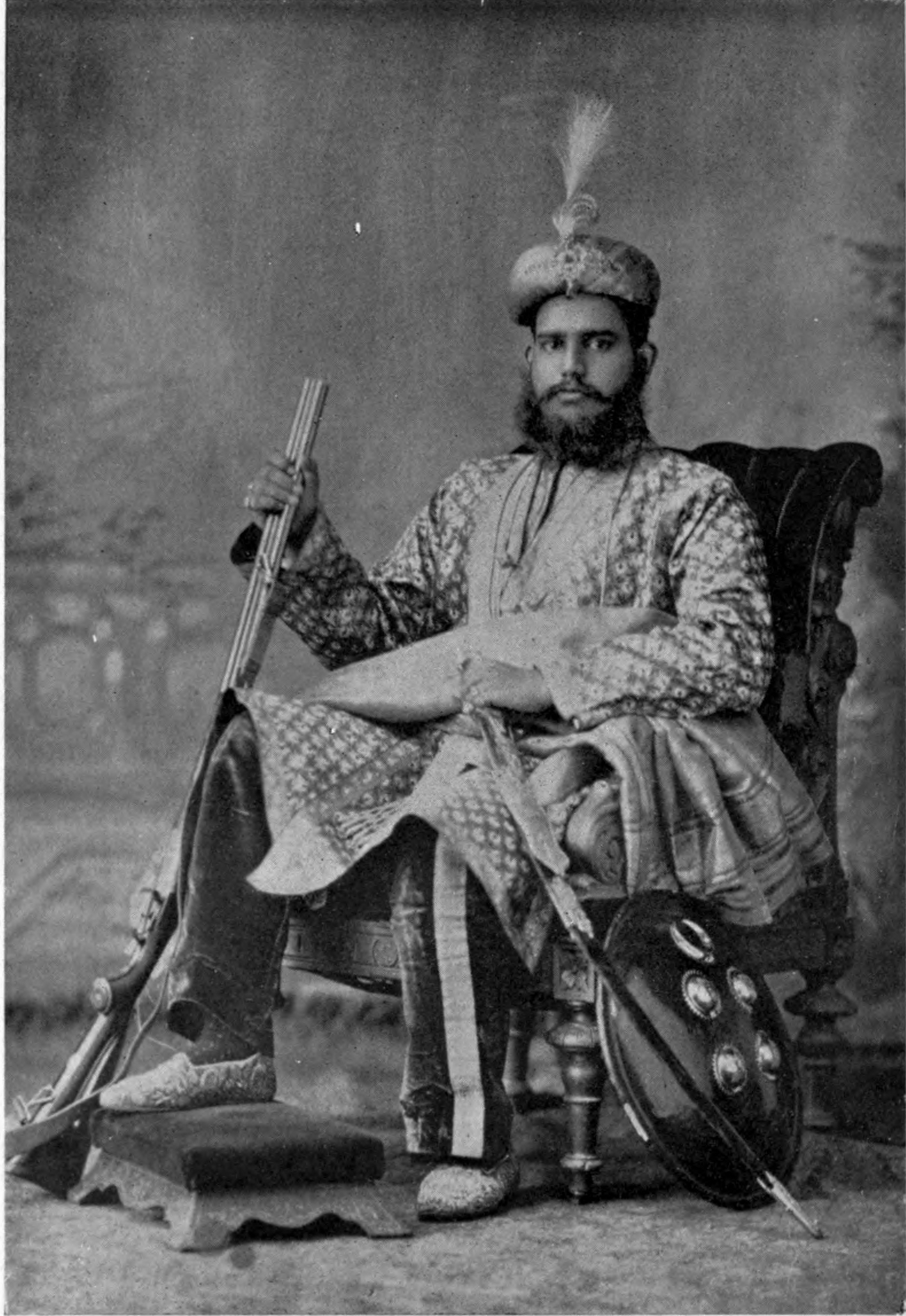
Raja Kshitish Chandra Roy of Nadia Raj

As per their traditional accounts, the Nadia Raj family is one of the oldest Hindu families in Bengal, spanning more than 35 generations from the founder. Since the establishment of British rule in Bengal each of the Rajas of Nadia were created a Maharaja Bahadur in succession. According to "Kshitishvamsavalicharitam" written by Dewan of Nadia Raj Kartikeya Chandra Roy, Rajas of Nadia were "Shakta" by faith.

== List of rulers ==
Sl. No.	Name of the king	Reign	Reign (year)	
1	Bhavananda Majumdar	1606–1628	22	
2	Gopal Roy	1628–1632	4	
3	Raghav Roy	1632–1683	51	
4	Rudra Roy	1683–1694	11	
5	Ramakrishna Roy	1694	1	
6	Ramjivan Roy	1694–1715	21	
7	Raghuram Roy	1715–1728	13	
8	Krishnachandra Roy	1728–1782	54	
9	Shivachandra Roy	1782–1788	6	
10	Ishwarchandra Roy	1788–1802	14	
11	Girijachandra Roy	1802–1842	40	
12	Srishchandra Roy	1842–1856	14	
13	Satishchandra Roy	1856–1870	14	Anamika Banerjee
